= Factory Records discography =

Discography of British record label

The following is a list of items with recorded Factory Records numbers. The list primarily consists of music releases but also includes promotional graphics, film, etc. However, the list was not confined to creative output. A party (FAC 83), a lawsuit (FAC 61) and a cat (FAC 191) appear on the list along with other miscellany.

Number allocation was only roughly chronological. Special numbers were reserved for significant Factory output. For instance, albums by Joy Division and New Order are typically catalogued under multiples of 25; the sole exceptions to this are two Joy Division albums: Unknown Pleasures (FACT 10) and Still (FACT 40). The final recording issued by Factory, Happy Mondays' 1992 single "Sunshine & Love", bears the number FAC 372; nevertheless, a handful of recordings issued earlier (sometimes years earlier) have higher catalogue numbers.

After Factory Records declared bankruptcy in 1992, Factory co-founder Tony Wilson continued to assign Factory numbers to numerous events and magazine interviews through to his death in 2007. Other late-period Factory catalogue items include a film (FAC 401), a recording issued by another label (FACT 500), a poster for a 2004 memorial event honouring Rob Gretton (FAC 511), and Tony Wilson's own coffin (FAC 501).

Several numbers (e.g., FAC 317/318/319) were multiply allocated to unrelated projects. As well, many of the catalogue numbers, especially those above FAC 330, weren't allocated at all (or were allocated to unreleased or unrealized projects).

For Factory Benelux, see Factory Benelux discography.

== The Factory numbering system ==
The last digit of the number may designate the following (but inconsistencies abound): 1 – Factory Corporate, 2 – Happy Mondays (singles), 3 – Joy Division / New Order (singles), 4 – Durutti Column, 6 – Factory Classical.

The "FACT" designation (as opposed to "FAC") usually denotes an album. The "FACD" designation is oftentimes used to denote compact disc releases of albums, though it is sometimes applied to LP and cassette releases as well; the designation "FACTUS" is typically used for American releases regardless of format.

Sometimes the number can contain a further insight:

- FACT 24, Various Artists: A Factory Quartet (album [x2]): 2 records, 4 artists, thus 2/4. (In addition, Durutti Column ["4"; see above] is on this release.)
- FAC 148, Styal Mill Sponsored Bucket (sponsorship): One of 48 blades on the mill wheel, thus 1/48.
- FAC 289, New Order: Campaign Technique (notepaper): Campaign ran in February 1989, thus 2/89. (This number was also used for The Wendys The Sun's Going to Shine For Me Soon single 2 years later. Double number assignments occur a few times within the catalogue.)
- FAC 321, Jonathan Demme: The Perfect Kiss (video). This is the reverse number of the release the video was made for: FAC 123, New Order: The Perfect Kiss. In addition, as noted above, 123 would signify a New Order single, and 321 a Factory Corporate project.

== Catalogue ==
No.	Artist	Title	Designer	Format	Date	Notes
FAC 1	Various Artists	The Factory (Club No. 1)	Peter Saville	event/poster	May 1978	
FAC-2	Various Artists: Cabaret Voltaire, Joy Division, Durutti Column, John Dowie	A Factory Sample	Peter Saville	2×7-inch	January 1979	Purported 12-inch versions are bootlegs
FAC 3	Various Artists	The Factory (Club No. 2)	Peter Saville	event/poster	October 1978	
FAC 4	Various Artists	The Factory December (Club No. 3)	Tony Wilson	event/poster	December 1978	
FAC 5	A Certain Ratio	All Night Party / The Thin Boys	Peter Saville	7-inch	May 1979	5,000 copies
FAC 6	Orchestral Manoeuvres in the Dark	Electricity / Almost	Peter Saville	7-inch	May 1979	5,000 copies
FAC 7	Peter Saville	Factory notepaper	Peter Saville	stationery	May 1979	
FAC 8	Linder Sterling	The Factory Egg-Timer				Concept for a menstrual abacus. "But this little artefact was never made, except for the sketches and four prototype beads."
FAC 9	Various Artists	No City Fun (The Factory Flick)		film	13 September 1979	by Charles Salem and Malcolm Whitehead
FACT 10	Joy Division	Unknown Pleasures	Peter Saville, Joy Division	album	June 1979	
FACT 10+4	Joy Division, Various Artists	FACT 10+4	Peter Saville	poster	June 1979	poster advertising FAC 5, FAC 6, FACT 10, FAC 11, FAC 12
FACT 10 40	Joy Division	Unknown Pleasures	Peter Saville, Joy Division	album	July 2019	40th anniversary pressing
FAC 11	X-o-dus	English Black Boys / See Them A-Come	Peter Saville	12-inch	February 1980	
FAC 12	The Distractions	Time Goes By So Slow		7-inch	September 1979	
FAC 13	Joy Division	Transmission / Novelty	Peter Saville	7-inch	October 1979	
FAC 1312	Joy Division	Transmission / Novelty	Peter Saville	12-inch	December 1980	
FAC 13 T	Joy Division, Factory Records	Transmission Factory logo	Peter Saville, Colin White	T-shirt	April 2004	
FACT 14	Durutti Column	The Return of the Durutti Column	Tony Wilson (sandpaper), Steve Horsfall (normal)	LP	January 1980	First 2000 copies in sandpaper sleeve
FACT 14-C	Martin Hannett	Testcard (The First Aspect of the Same Thing / The Second Aspect of the Same Thing)	Peter Saville	flexi-disc	January 1980	Free with initial copies of FACT 14
FACT 14-C	Durutti Column	The Return of the Durutti Column	Peter Saville	cassette	1986	
FAC 15	Various Artists	Zoo Meets Factory Halfway, Leigh Festival	Peter Saville	event, poster	27 August 1979	festival, featuring Factory and Zoo bands
FACT 16	A Certain Ratio	The Graveyard and the Ballroom		cassette	January 1980	reissued as FACT 16-C; side one is studio, side two is live at the Electric Ballroom, 26 October 1979
FAC 17	Crawling Chaos	Sex Machine / Berlin	Jon Savage	single	August 1980	See also FAC 27
FAC 18	Section 25	Girls Don't Count // Knew Noise / Up to You	Ben Kelly, Peter Saville	7-inch	July 1980	7-inch B-side 33 rpm
FAC 18	Section 25	Girls Don't Count // Knew Noise / Up to You	Larry Cassidy	12-inch	December 1980	3 different sleeves on 12-inch, with photos of Jenny Ross (later Jenny Cassidy), Julie Waddington or Angela Cassidy
FAC 19	John Dowie	It's Hard To Be An Egg / Mind Sketch		7-inch	May 1981	
FAC 20	Liz Naylor	Too Young To Know, Too Wild To Care				Planned film concept by Wilson, script by Naylor. Never went beyond notes.
FAC 21		Fractured Music "F" Logo	Peter Saville/Martyn Atkins	logo/badge	March 1981 (logo); June 1981 (badge)	Fractured Music was Joy Division's publishing arm. 400 maroon badges, 200 black
FAC 22	A Certain Ratio	Flight // Blown Away / And Then Again	Peter Saville/Martyn Atkins	12-inch	October 1980	
FAC 23	Joy Division	Love Will Tear Us Apart // These Days / Love Will Tear Us Apart (Again)	Peter Saville, Ben Kelly	7-inch, 12-inch	June 1980	7-inch B-side has both songs, at 33 rpm
FACT 24	Various Artists: Durutti Column, Blurt, Kevin Hewick, The Royal Family And The Poor	A Factory Quartet	Peter Saville	album	December 1980	
FACT 25	Joy Division	Closer	Peter Saville, Martyn Atkins	album	July 1980	
FACT 26	Durutti Column	Durutti in Paris	Stephen Horsfall	poster/event, cancelled	April 1980	seven copies of poster produced
FAC 27		Saville revenge project	Rob Gretton, Alan Erasmus, Peter Saville	unreleased sleeve	1980	FAC 159 states: "Cancelled Saville/Gretton revenge programme project for alternative FAC 17 sleeve"; Erasmus visiting Saville's London office because the sleeve for FAC 17 was so late
FAC 28	Joy Division	Komakino / Incubation / As You Said		flexi-disc	July 1980	Outtakes from Closer
FAC 29	The Names	Night Shift	Ian Wright	7-inch	January 1981	
FACT 30	Sex Pistols	The Heyday		cassette	December 1980	Interviews by Fred and Judy Vermorel in August 1977 for The Inside Story
FAC 31	Minny Pops	Dolphin Spurt	Martyn Atkins	single	January 1981	
FAC 32	Crispy Ambulance	Unsightly and Serene (Not What I Expected / Deaf)	Martyn Atkins	10-inch	1980	
FAC 33	New Order	Ceremony / In A Lonely Place	Peter Saville	7-inch, 12-inch	January 1981	Two different 12-inch mixes with different sleeves
FAC 34	ESG	You're No Good	Stephen Horsfall	7-inch	June 1981	
FACT 35	A Certain Ratio	To Each...	Ann Quigley (art), Peter Christopherson (design)	LP	May 1981	
FAC 36	Joy Division	U.S. Joy Division Closer campaign		advertisement	June 1981	US advertising campaign for Closer (FACTUS-36)
FACT 37	Joy Division	Here Are The Young Men	Peter Saville	VHS, Beta	August 1982	Ikon FCL IKON-2
FACT 38	A Certain Ratio	Below the Canal		VHS		not completed
FAC 39	Tunnelvision	Watching The Hydroplanes	Peter Saville	7-inch	June 1981	clear vinyl
FACT 40	Joy Division	Still	Peter Saville	2×LP, cassette, CD	October 1981	Various cover designs; CD missing unlisted LP track "Twenty-Four Hours"
FAC 41	Stockholm Monsters	Fairy Tales	Mark Farrow	single	January 1982	
FACT 42	A Certain Ratio	The Double 12-inch	Ann Quigley (art), Peter Christopherson (design)	2×12-inch	January 1982	FAC-22 and FACTUS-4 packaged together; released in Italy, France, Australia and New Zealand
FAC 43	The Royal Family and the Poor	Art Dream Dominion (Art on 45 / 5:12 Dream / 4:12 Dominion)	Trevor Johnson	12-inch	February 1982	
FACT 44	Durutti Column	LC	Les Thompson	album	November 1981	
FACT 45	Section 25	Always Now	Peter Saville/Grafica Industria	LP, cassette	September 1981	
FACT 46	Various Artists	The Video Circus		video screenings, posters	June 1980 onward	three hours of promotional video shown at gigs and galleries
FAC 47		Factory anvil logo	Peter Saville	logo	July 1980	
FAC 48	Kevin Hewick	Ophelia's Drinking Song / Cathy's Clown / He Holds You Tighter	Martyn Atkins	7-inch	20 November 1981	
FAC 49	Swamp Children	Little Voices / Call Me Honey / Boy	Ann Quigley	12-inch	October 1981	
FACT 50	New Order	Movement	Peter Saville	album	November 1981	
FAC 51		The Haçienda	Ben Kelly	nightclub	21 May 1982	
FAC 51-B	New Order	Merry Xmas From The Haçienda and Factory Records (Rocking Carol / Ode To Joy)		flexi-disc	December 1982	4400-edition flexidisc given away at Haçienda's first Christmas
FAC 52	A Certain Ratio	Waterline / Funaezekea	Ben Kelly	12-inch	December 1981	
FAC 53	New Order	Procession / Everything's Gone Green	Peter Saville	7-inch	September 1981	Sleeve available in nine different colours printed on grey card: yellow, blue, purple, orange, brown, green, black, red, aqua
FAC 54		Haçienda Construction		VHS	1981	Footage of the Haçienda under construction; some tapes sent out to Factory friends; some footage used on FACT 71
FACT 55	A Certain Ratio	Sextet	Denis King, Ben Kelly	LP	January 1982	
FACT 56	Various Artists	A Factory Video	Peter Saville	VHS, Beta	August 1982	Ikon FCL IKON-3
FAC 57	Minny Pops	Secret Story / Island	Rob van Middendorp	7-inch	September 1982	
FAC 58	Stockholm Monsters	Happy Ever After / Soft Babies	Mark Farrow	7-inch	August 1982	
FAC 59	52nd Street	Look Into My Eyes (edit) / Express (edit)	Paul Taylor	12-inch	August 1982	white label 7-inch exists
FAC 59-T	52nd Street	Look Into My Eyes / Express	Paul Taylor	12-inch	August 1982	
FACT 60	The Wake	Harmony	James Kay, The Wake	LP	September 1982	Also FBN 29 (with extra track "Chance")
FAC 61		In the Matter of Factory (Communications) Limited and in the Matter of the Companies Acts 1948 to 1980		lawsuit	16 March 1982	Martin Hannett's writ to wind up Factory Communications Ltd
FAC 62	A Certain Ratio	Knife Slits Water / Tumba Rumba		7-inch	September 1982	
FAC 62	A Certain Ratio	Knife Slits Water / Kether Hot Knives (Mix In Special)		12-inch	September 1982	
FAC 63	New Order	Temptation / Hurt	Peter Saville	7-inch, 12-inch	April 1982	
FAC 64	Durutti Column	I Get Along Without You Very Well / Prayer	Mark Farrow	7-inch	June 1983	
FACT 65	A Certain Ratio	I'd Like to See You Again	Agidi, Kennedy's Studios	LP	November 1982	
FAC 66	Section 25	The Beast	Mark Farrow	12-inch	July 1982	
FAC 67	Quando Quango	Go Exciting / Tingle	Alan David-Tu	12-inch	1982	
FAC 68	Section 25	Back To Wonder / Beating Heart	Mark Farrow	7-inch	June 1983	12-inch test pressings exist
FAC 69						unassigned
FACT 70	Swamp Children	So Hot	Ann Quigley	album	October 1982	Also FBN-21 with different sleeve
FACT 71	Various Artists	A Factory Outing		VHS, Beta	October 1983	Ikon FCL IKON-5
FAC 72	A Certain Ratio	I Need Someone Tonite / Don't You Worry 'Bout A Thing	Mark Farrow	12-inch	July 1983	7-inch promos exist
FAC 73	New Order	Blue Monday / The Beach	Peter Saville	12-inch	March 1983	
FAC 73R	New Order	Blue Monday 1988 / Beach Buggy		7-inch, 12-inch	March 1988	Remixed by Quincy Jones and John Potoker
FACT 74	Durutti Column	Another Setting	Mark Farrow	album	August 1983	
FACT 75	New Order	Power, Corruption & Lies	Peter Saville	album	May 1983	
FACT 76	Jazz Defektors	The Jazz Defektors Film		video		unreleased; 8 minute video eventually included on FACT 137
FACT 77	New Order	Taras Shevchenko	Peter Saville Associates	VHS, Beta	1983	Ikon FCL IKON-4
FAC 78	James	Jimone	Jim Glennie	7-inch	September 1983	
FACX 79		A Factory Product: For your protection Xmas 79/80	Tony Wilson	earplugs and breathing mask	December 1979	1979 Christmas present
FAC 79	Quando Quango	Love Tempo	Mark Holt (sticker), F-Dot sleeve	12-inch	1983	Also FBN-23 on Factory Benelux and OFNY-5 on Of Factory New York
FACT 80	Stockholm Monsters	Alma Mater	Johnson/Panas	album	September 1984	
FAC 81		Factory International Congress		event	September 10, 1981	Meeting of Factory staff and associates
FAC 82	Cabaret Voltaire	Yashar	Mark Holt (sticker)	12-inch	July 1983	Also FBN-25 on Factory Benelux
FAC 83		Haçienda 1 Year	Peter Saville Associates	event		
FACT 84	Durutti Column	Without Mercy	8vo	album	October 1984	
FACT 85	Thick Pigeon	Too Crazy Cowboys	Lawrence Weiner	LP	October 1984	
FAC 86	Stockholm Monsters	Shake It To The Bank		7-inch		unreleased
FAC 86-R		The Haçienda must be built	Trevor Johnson	cardboard model kit	December 1983	1983 Christmas present; reissued 1990
FAC 87	Kalima	The Smiling Hour / Flyaway		7-inch, 12-inch	January 1984	
FAC 88	The Wake	Talk About The Past / Everybody Works So Hard	Jackie Gribbon, The Wake	7-inch, 12-inch	March 1984	Extended versions on 12-inch
FACT 89	John Dowie	Dowie	Ralph Steadman	VHS, Beta	December 1983	Ikon FCL IKON-6
FACT 90	Section 25	From the Hip	Peter Saville	LP, cassette	March 1984	
FAC 91		Facsoft		software		Computer program, never made it past the idea
FAC 92	Marcel King	Reach For Love / Keep On Dancin'		12-inch	March 1984	7-inch promo exists
FAC 92-R	Marcel King	Reach For Love (New York remix) // Reach For Love (dub) / Keep On Dancin'		12-inch	February 1985	A-side and dub also released as FBN-43
FAC 93	New Order	Confusion	Peter Saville, Phill Pennington	12-inch	August 1983	
FAC 94		F-Dot Logo	Peter Saville Associates	logo/sleeve/badge	1983	First used on FAC-79
FACT 95	The Royal Family and the Poor	The Project Phase 1 – The Temple of the 13th Tribe	Trevor Johnson, Mike Keane	album	November 1984	
FAC 96	Ad Infinitum	Telstar	Trevor Johnson	7-inch	March 1984	Lindsay Reade
FAC 97	Streetlife	Act On Instinct	Ron Van Roon, Tom Mulder	12-inch	February 1984	Minny Pops
FAC 98		Swing		salon	October 1983	Andrew Berry's hairdressing salon in Haçienda basement
FAC 99		Molar reconstruction, Rob Gretton's dental file		event		
FACT 100	New Order	Low-Life	Peter Saville	album	May 1985	
FAC 101		Lofts		apartment concept		Loft-style cooperative apartment plan by Wilson, never built
FAC 102	Quando Quango	2 From Quando (Atom Rock)	Alan David-Tu	7-inch/12-inch	June 1984	
FAC 103	New Order	Thieves Like Us / Lonesome Tonight	Peter Saville, Phill Pennington, Trevor Key	single	April 1984	Cover image based on "The Evil Genius of a King" by Giorgio de Chirico
FAC 104		The Tube live at the Haçienda		event	27 January 1984	Channel 4 broadcast
FACT 105	Biting Tongues	Feverhouse The Soundtrack		LP	February 1985	
FACT 105-V	Howard Walmsley	Feverhouse		VHS, Beta	February 1985	Ikon FCL IKON-10
FAC 106	Life	Tell Me	Mark Farrow	7-inch	July 1984	French version "Dites Moi" released as FBN-37
FAC 107	Stockholm Monsters	All At Once / National Pastime	Johnson/Panas	7-inch	June 1984	
FAC 108	Section 25	Looking From A Hilltop	Peter Saville	12-inch	June 1984	
FAC 109	Caroline Lavelle	Untitled and Undone		single, not recorded		
FACT 110	Quando Quango	Pigs + Battleships	Alan David-Tu	LP, cassette	November 1985	
FAC 110-12	Quando Quango	Love Tempo (Mark Kamins Mix) / Atom Rock (Mark Kamins Remix)		12-inch	November 1985	Factory Australasia-only 12-inch with FACT-110
FAC 111	Shark Vegas	You Hurt Me / But Now Your Flesh Lies Rotting In Hell	Mark Farrow	12-inch	January 1986	
FAC 112	A Certain Ratio	Life's A Scream / There's Only This	Johnson/Panas	12-inch	December 1984	
FAC 113	The Wake	Of The Matter	Jackie Gribbon, The Wake	7-inch	October 1985	
FAC 114	Durutti Column	Say What You Mean, Mean What You Say	8vo	12-inch EP	January 1985	
FAC 115		Second generation notepaper	Peter Saville Associates	stationery	1984	using Factory silhouette logo
FAC 116	Red Turns To ...	Deep Sleep		12-inch	1984	plain F-Dot sleeve
FAC 117	Abecedarians	Smiling Monarchs / Benway's Carnival		12-inch	April 1985	
FAC 118	52nd Street	Can't Afford (To Let You Go)		7-inch, 12-inch	October 1984	White label only
FAC 119	James	Hymn From A Village	John Carroll	7-inch	March 1985	
FAC 120		Factory Silhouette logo	Peter Saville Associates	logo/badge	July 1984	
FAC 121	Various Artists	Riverside Exhibition & Performances	Peter Saville	event		A week of Factory bands showcased at Riverside Studios, Hammersmith, London
FAC 122	Life	Optimism / Better	Mark Farrow	7-inch	April 1985	
FAC 123	New Order	The Perfect Kiss / The Kiss Of Death / Perfect Pit	Peter Saville	single	May 1985	Outer sleeve silver; inner sleeve cyan, blue or black
FAC 124	Streetlife	No More Silence / No More Silence (Short Version) / Chopper's Delight	Ron Van Roon, Tom Mulder	12-inch	March 1985	Minny Pops
FACT 125	Various Artists	Bessy talks Turkey: Xmas 1984		VHS, Beta	October 1984	Promotional Christmas video of Factory acts, discussed and presented by Claude Bessy; original title Factory Video Hype; Ikon FCL IKON-11
FAC 126	Alan Erasmus	Alan Goes To Moscow		event	April 1985	Alan Erasmus A&R visit to the Soviet Union
FAC 126		Alan Goes To Moscow	Phil Pennington, Peter Saville	poster	April 1985	poster to promote Erasmus visit to Moscow
FAC 127	Kalima	Four Songs (Trickery / Land of Dreams / Sparkle / So Sad)	Trevor Johnson	12-inch	October 1985	
FAC 128	A Certain Ratio	Wild Party / Sounds Like Something Dirty	Trevor Johnson	12-inch, cassette	June 1985	Extra live tracks on cassette
FAC 129	Happy Mondays	Forty Five E.P. (Delightful / This Feeling / Oasis)	Central Station Design	single	September 1985	
FACT 130	The Wake	Here Comes Everybody	Jackie Gribbon, The Wake	LP	November 1985	cassette prepared but unreleased
FAC 131	Various Artists	it isn't only lowlife who record for Factory	Peter Saville Associates	poster		Poster promoting forthcoming releases FACT-80, FACT-85, FACT-84, FACT-95, FACT-100, FACT-110, FACT-130
FAC 132	Section 25	Crazy Dancing		7-inch, not released		planned 7-inch version of 12-inch FBN-45
FAC 133	New Order	Sub-culture / Dub-vulture	Peter Saville	7-inch, 12-inch	November 1985	
FAC 134	Biting Tongues	Trouble Hand / Panorama / Meat Mask Separatist / Boss Toyota Trouble / Probate	Johnson/Panas	single	November 1985	
FACT 135	A Certain Ratio	The Old And The New	Johnson/Panas	LP+7-inch, cassette	January 1986	
FAC 136		Factory adhesive tape	Peter Saville	stationery	2009	Promotional adhesive tape for Rhino Factory Records: Communications 1978–92 box set; thus, not officially numbered by Wilson. factoryrecords.org dates this as 1985.
FAC 137	Quando Quango	Genius / Rebel		12-inch	October 1985	7-inch promo 7-FAC-137
FACT 137	Various Artists	Shorts	Trevor Johnson	VHS, Beta	June 1985	Ikon FCL IKON-12
FAC 138	James	Village Fire, 5 Offerings From...	John Carroll	12-inch	June 1985	FAC-78 and FAC-119 on a 12-inch
FAC 139	The Royal Family and the Poor	We Love the Moon / White Stains	Johnson/Panas	7-inch picture disc	1986	
FACT 140	The Royal Family and the Poor	We Love the Moon: The Project – Phase 2	Johnson/Panas	LP	1986	
FAC 141		Third generation logo	Peter Saville Associates	stationery		using Factory mark from FAC-115
FAC 142	Happy Mondays	Freaky Dancin' / The Egg	Central Station Design	12-inch	June 1986	
FAC 143	New Order	Shellshock / Shellcock	Geoff Power (photo), Peter Saville (design)	7-inch, 12-inch	March 1986	Non-UK versions B-side "Thieves Like Us (instrumental)"
FACD 144	Durutti Column	Domo Arigato	8vo	CD	1985	first Factory CD-only release; Wilson claimed first non-classical CD-only release in the UK
FACT 144	Durutti Column	Domo Arigato	8vo	VHS, Beta	1986	Ikon FCL IKON-16
FAC 145		Christmas 1985 CD wallet	Peter Saville Associates	Christmas card	December 1985	
FAC 146	Stockholm Monsters	Partyline / Militia / Partylive	Johnson/Panas	12-inch	April 1987	7-inch test pressings exist
FAC 147	Kalima	Whispered Words / Sugar And Spice / In Time	Trevor Johnson	single	May 1986	
FAC 148		Quarry Bank Mill, Styal, Cheshire Sponsored Bucket		sponsorship		Sponsored bucket in National Trust mill restoration
FAC 149	Little Big Band	First Project		album, aborted		
FACT 150	New Order	Brotherhood	Peter Saville Associates	LP, cassette	September 1986	
FAC 151	Various Artists	The Festival of the Tenth Summer	Peter Saville Associates, Malcolm Garrett/Assorted Images	event	July 1986	
FAC 152		From Manchester with Love		T-shirt	February 1986	T-shirt donated for benefit concert
FAC 153	New Order	State of the Nation / Shame of the Nation	Peter Saville Associates	single	September 1986	
FACD 154	Durutti Column	Circuses and Bread	8vo	CD	September 1986	LP on Factory Benelux FBN-36
FACT 155	Kalima	Night Time Shadows	Trevor Johnson	album	May 1985	
FAC 156	Quando Quango	Bad Blood		7-inch, 12-inch		unreleased
FAC 157	Section 25	Bad News Week	Mark Farrow	12-inch	May 1987	
FAC 158	Anna Domino	Summer	Benoit Hennebert	single	August 1986	also Crépuscule TWI-641
FAC 159	Tim Difford	FAC-Facts	Tim Difford	booklets		
FACT 160	Section 25	Love & Hate	A.S.K. Design Co.	album	March 1988	
FAC 161		Out Promotion		contract/event	1986	hiring of Out Promotion (Dave Harper/Nicki Kefelas) by Factory
FAC 162	The Railway Children	A Gentle Sound / Content / Darkness and Colour	Gary Newby	12-inch	September 1986	
FAC 163	New Order	Bizarre Love Triangle	Peter Saville Associates	single	5 November 1986	
FAC 163153	New Order	Bizarre Love Triangle / State of the Nation	Peter Saville Associates	7-inch	November 1986	Australia-only 7-inch, in FAC-163 sleeve
FACD 164	Durutti Column	Valuable Passages	8vo	CD	November 1986	Compilation, originally compiled for US and Australia
FACT 165	Anna Domino	Anna Domino	Benoit Hennebert	album	August 1986	Also Crépuscule TWI-600
FAC 166-12	A Certain Ratio	Bootsy / Mickey Way	Johnson/Panas	12-inch	November 1987	Australia-only release on Factory Australasia
FAC 166-7	A Certain Ratio	Bootsy / Inside		7-inch	November 1987	Australia-only 7-inch
FACT 166	A Certain Ratio	Force	Johnson/Panas	LP, cassette, CD	November 1986	
FAC 167	The Railway Children	Brighter / History Burns / Careful	Gary Newby	12-inch	February 1987	
FAC 167-7	The Railway Children	Brighter / History Burns	Gary Newby	7-inch	April 1987	Australia-only 7-inch
FAC 168	A Certain Ratio	Mickey Way (the Candy Bar) (Wild Party / Sounds Like Something Dirty)	Johnson/Panas	12-inch, cassette	June 1985	Extra live tracks on cassette
FAC 169	The Pleasure Crew	So Good	Realisation	12-inch	October 1987	
FACT 170	Happy Mondays	Squirrel and G-Man Twenty Four Hour Party People Plastic Face Carnt Smile (White Out)	Central Station Design	LP, cassette	April 1987	
FAC 171	Peter Saville	Compact	Peter Saville Associates	installation	September 1986	installation by Peter Saville at White Columns gallery, New York
FAC 172	The Railway Children	Overseas Single Collection				album concept, aborted
FAC 173	New Order	Bizarre Love Triangle	Robert Longo	video		
FAC 174	Durutti Column	Valuable Press Pack	8vo	press kit	1986	Press kit for FACD 164
FAC 175	Thick Pigeon	Blue Christmas	Paul Jackson	origami box, cassette	December 1986	Christmas present
FAC 176	Happy Mondays	Tart Tart / Little Matchstick Owen's Rap	Central Station Design	12-inch	March 1987	
FACT 177	New Order	Pumped Full of Drugs	Chris Mathan, Peter Saville Associates	VHS	August 1986	
FAC 178	The Wake	Something That No One Else Could Bring (Gruesome Castle / Pale Spectre // Furious Sea / Plastic Flowers)	Realisation	12-inch	November 1987	
FAC 179	Miaow	When It All Comes Down / Did She	Slimm Smith	12-inch	January 1987	
FACT 180-1	Various Artists	Factory In Store Video No 1		VHS	April 1987	promotional video
FAC 181	The Bailey Brothers	The Mad Fuckers		film concept		Happy Mondays film concept, aborted; FAC-221 was the visit to Hollywood attempting to secure funding The Mad Fuckers was the origin of the term "Madchester."
FAC 182	The Hood / Jumpin' Jesus	Salvation! / You Can't Blackmail Jesus		12-inch	October 1987	
FAC 182-7	The Hood / Jumpin' Jesus	Salvation! / You Can't Blackmail Jesus		7-inch	December 1987	Australia-only 7-inch
FACT 182	Various Artists	Salvation!		LP, cassette, CD	October 1987	Factory Australasia numbering of Factory Benelux/Crépuscule TWI-774
FAC 183	New Order	True Faith / 1963	Peter Saville Associates, Trevor Key	single	20 July 1987	
FAC 183	New Order	True Faith	Peter Saville Associates, Trevor Key	paperweight	July 1987	promotional paperweight
FAC 183-R	New Order	True Faith Remix / 1963 / True Faith Dub	Peter Saville Associates, Trevor Key	12-inch	August 1987	Remixed by Shep Pettibone; different sleeve to FAC-183
FAC 183-R	New Order	True Faith Remix / True Dub / Paradise Remix	Peter Saville Associates, Trevor Key	12-inch	August 1987	Australia-only remix of "Paradise" by Robert Racic
FAC 184	Durutti Column	The City of Our Lady (Our Lady Of The Angels / White Rabbit / Catos con Guantes)	8vo	12-inch	August 1987	
FACT 185	The Railway Children	Reunion Wilderness	Gary Newby	LP, cassette, CD	November 1987	
FACT 186	Various Artists	Festival of the 10th Summer		album/video, unreleased		
FAC 187	Kalima	Weird Feelings / The Dance	Johnson/Panas	single	May 1987	
FAC 188	Biting Tongues	Compressor / Black Jesus / Black & White Jesus	Johnson/Panas	12-inch	October 1987	
FAC 189	Miaow	Break the Code / Stolen Ears		7-inch	October 1987	
FACT 190	Wim Mertens	Educes Me	Joel Van Audenhaeghe	LP, cassette	September 1987	also Crépuscule TWI-808
FAC 191	Fred	The Haçienda cat		cat		
FAC 192	Happy Mondays	24 Hour Party People / Yahoo / Wah Wah (Think Tank)	Central Station Design	12-inch	November 1987	7-inch promo exists
FAC 193	New Order	Touched by the Hand of God	Peter Saville Associates	7-inch, 12-inch, CD	December 1987	From the soundtrack of Salvation!
FAC 194	DV8 Physical Theatre and The Durutti Column	When The World (Newson Mix)	8vo	VHS	December 1987	Directed, edited and produced by Carole Lamond
FACD 194	Durutti Column	Our Lady of the Angels / When the World (Newson Mix) / Catos con Guantes	8vo	CD	December 1987	
FACDV 194	DV8 Physical Theatre and The Durutti Column	When the World (soundtrack) / When the World (album) / Final Cut / When the World (video)	8vo	CD Video	December 1987	Directed, edited and produced by Carole Lamond
FACT 195	Wim Mertens	The Belly of An Architect		LP	November 1987	also Crépuscule TWI-813
FAC 196	Meat Mouth	Meat Mouth is Murder	Julie Lomax	12-inch	October 1987	
FAC 197	Fadela	N'Sel Fik	Johnson/Panas	12-inch	November 1987	
FAC 198-7	Vermorel	Stereo/Porno		7-inch	February 1988	Specially commissioned for the BPI Awards 1988
FAC 199	Vermorel	Bums for BPI		poster		
FACT 200	New Order	Substance	Peter Saville	2×LP, 2×CD, 2×cassette, DAT	August 1987	
FAC 201		Dry	Ben Kelly, Peter Saville Associates	bar	25 July 1989	
FAC 202		Dream Flight Balloons		charity sponsorship		
FAC 203	New Order	12 Inches of New Order	Peter Saville	plastic ruler		promotion for FACT 200
FACT 204	Durutti Column	The Guitar and Other Machines	8vo	LP, cassette, CD	December 1987	
FACT 204	Durutti Column	When The World		VHS	24 October 1987	same video as FAC 194, used to promote FACT 204
FACT 205	Jazz Defektors	Jazz Defektors	James Martin, Graeme Cooper	LP	May 1988	
FACT 206	Kalima	Kalima!	Johnson/Panas	LP, cassette, CD	May 1988	
FACD 207	Little Big Band	Little Big Band		CD	1988	
FAC 208		Post G-Mex Haçienda Party		event		
FAC 209	Happy Mondays	Film Shoot		video		
FACT 210	Cath Carroll	England Made Me	Chris Mathan	LP, CD	June 1991	
FAC 211		Joy Division		TV documentary	1989	Documentary on Channel 4 music show Wired, made to coincide with release of Joy Division catalogue on CD
FAC 212	Happy Mondays	Wrote for Luck / Boom	Central Station Design	7-inch, 12-inch, CD	October 1988	
FAC 213	Joy Division	Atmosphere / The Only Mistake	Brett Wickens, Peter Saville Associates	7-inch	June 1988	
FAC 213.12	Joy Division	Atmosphere / The Only Mistake / Sound Of Music	Brett Wickens, Peter Saville Associates	12-inch	June 1988	
FACD 213	Joy Division	Atmosphere / Transmission (live) / Love Will Tear Us Apart	Brett Wickens, Peter Saville Associates	CD	June 1988	
FAC 214	Durutti Column	The Guitar and Other Marketing Devices	8vo	flexi-disc	December 1987	promotional flexi for FACT 204
FAC 215		Vin D'Usine Blanc, Haçienda House Wine (White)	Peter Saville Associates	bottle		
FAC 216		Vin D'Usine Rouge, Haçienda House Wine (Red)	Peter Saville Associates	bottle		
FACT 217	To Hell with Burgundy	Earthbound	Central Station Design	LP	May 1989	
FACD 218	To Hell with Burgundy	Who Wants to Change the World? / Money / Mother of the Sea	Central Station Design	CD		Possibly promo-only
FAC 219	Kalima	Flyaway		LP, CD	June 1989	
FAC 220	Happy Mondays	Bummed	Central Station Design	LP, CD, cassette, DAT	November 1988	
FAC 221		Factory Goes to Hollywood		trip to Hollywood	November 1989	Tony Wilson's visit to Hollywood to pitch a Happy Mondays film
FAC 221		Factory Goes to Hollywood		badge	November 1989	Factory US logo badge
FAC 221		The Factory Contract	8vo	binder	May 1990	Binder for holding artist contracts. "Two 12-inchx12" clear perspex plates with screenprinted signal green, silver and signal orange design, held with 4 metal bolts. The bolt positions are located to hold A4 sheets in place and allow for a variable number of pages."
FAC 222	Happy Mondays/Karl Denver	Lazyitis (One Armed Boxer) / Mad Cyril (Hello Girls)	Central Station Design	7-inch, 12-inch, cassette	May 1989	
FAC 223	New Order	Fine Time	Peter Saville Associates, Trevor Key	single	November 1988	
FACD 224	Durutti Column	The First Four Albums	8vo	CD box set	1 February 1988	Box set of The Return of the Durutti Column (FACT 14), LC (FACT 44), Another Setting (FACT 74), Without Mercy (FACT 84) and Say What You Mean, Mean What You Say (FAC 114)
FACT 225	New Order	Substance	Peter Saville Associates	VHS	September 1989	
FACT 226	Kreisler String Orchestra	Kreisler String Orchestra	Peter Saville Associates	LP, cassette, CD	September 1989	DAT planned but never released
FAC 227	Fred Dellar	Fred Fact		newspaper page	1 July 1989	p. 50, New Musical Express, 1 July 1989: Factory trivia, Factory Benelux discography
FAC 228	Karl Denver	Wimoweh 89	Central Station Design	12-inch	October 1989	
FAC 229		FAC229! The Music Week Factorial	Peter Saville Associates	advertorial	15 July 1989	booklet with Music Week
FACT 230	Revenge	One True Passion	Peter Saville	LP	June 1990	
FAC 231		Yo John, Music Week for John Peel's 50th birthday		advertisement		
FAC 232	Happy Mondays	W.F.L. (The Vince Clarke Mix / "Think About The Future" The Paul Oakenfold Mix / Lazyitis – one armed boxer)	Central Station Design	7-inch, 12-inch, cassette, CD	September 1989	remix of FAC 212
FAC 233	Joy Division, New Order, Factory Communications Limited	Substantial Matters 1986–1988 between Joy Division, New Order and Factory Communications Limited		accounts	1988	
FACD 234	Durutti Column	Womad 88 (Live) (Otis / English Landscape Tradition / Finding The Sea / Bordeaux)	Johnson/Panas	CD single	July 1989	
FAC 235	New Order	Blue Monday Manual Video	Robert Breer, Peter Saville Associates	Flickbook	1988	1988 Christmas present; flickbook for FAC-73-R video
FACT 236	Robin Williams	Robin Williams	Peter Saville Associates, Trevor Johnson	LP, cassette, CD, DAT	September 1989	
FAC 237	New Order	Here are the Old Men		VHS		unreleased
FAC 238		Haçienda '96: Citius Altius Fortius		shirt	July 1990	T-shirt to assist Manchester bid for the 2000 Summer Olympics
FAC 239	Happy Mondays	Halcyon Daze #2		fanzine		Happy Mondays fanzine, allocated FAC number
FAC 240		Factory Year Planner	Peter Saville Associates	stationery	January 1988	tenth-anniversary wall planner (starts 24 January 1988)
FAC 241		Just Say No to London		t-shirt concept		
FAC 242	Happy Mondays	Madchester Rave On (Hallelujah / Holy Ghost // Clap Your Hands / Rave On)	Central Station Design	2×7-inch, 12-inch, cassette, CD	November 1989	
FAC 242-R	Happy Mondays	Madchester Rave On (Hallelujah (MacColl Mix) / Rave On (Club Mix) / Hallelujah (In Out Mix))	Central Station Design	7-inch, 12-inch, CD	November 1989	
FAC 243	Steve Mason	Technique Bronze Cherub		art		
FACT 244	Durutti Column	Vini Reilly	8vo	LP, CD, cassette, DAT	March 1989	
FACT 244+	Vincent Gerard & Steven Patrick	I Know Very Well How I Got My Note Wrong	Johnson/Panas	7-inch, CD3	March 1989	limited 7-inch/CD3 with first pressing of FACT-244; outtake of "I Know Very Well How I Got My Name" from sessions for Viva Hate by Morrissey
FAC 245		Madchester Christmas 1989	Johnson/Panas	Postcard set	1989	1989 Christmas present: 5 postcards of Manchester icons, with "Manchester" changed to "Madchester"
FACT 246	Duke String Quartet	Duke String Quartet	Peter Saville Associates, Mark Farrow	LP, cassette, CD, DAT	September 1989	
FACT 247	Revenge	7 Reasons / Jesus ... I Love You	Peter Saville Associates	7-inch, 12-inch, CD	November 1989	
FAC 248	Various Artists	On CD At Last, On Dat Already		advertisement	17 March 1990	advertisement in New Musical Express 17 March 1990 for Factory CD and DAT releases
FACT 249	Kalima	Feeling Fine	Johnson/Panas	LP, CD	August 1990	
FACT 250	Joy Division	Substance	Brett Wickens, Peter Saville Associates	LP, CD, cassette, DAT	June 1988	
FAC 251		New Factory Building (headquarters)	Ben Kelly	building		now indie rock club "FAC251 The Factory", run by Peter Hook
FACD 251	Steve and Gillian	Loved It (The New Factory)		CD	September 1990	Promo, distributed at opening of new Factory headquarters
FAC 252	Happy Mondays	Hallelujah Radio-Only CD		single	December 1989	
FAC 253	Rob Gretton / Tony Wilson	Chairman Resigns		event		
FACT 254	Durutti Column	Guitar One – House		album		Abandoned idea for album in house and dance style
FAC 255	Cath Carroll	Beast		12-inch, CD, cassette	October 1990	
FAC 255	Cath Carroll	Beast	Douglas Brothers	VHS	October 1990	Promotional video tape, part of FAC 315
FAC 256	Rolf Hind	Rolf Hind	Peter Saville Associates, Bracken Harper	LP, cassette, CD, DAT	September 1989	
FAC 257	Electronic	Getting Away with It	Peter Saville Associates	7-inch, 12-inch, cassette, CD	December 1989	
FAC 258		FAC-Off	Central Station Design	T-shirt		
FAC 259		Factory staff party		event	February 19, 1990	Tony Wilson's 40th birthday party
FACT 260	Happy Mondays	Hallelujah	Central Station Design	single		
FAC 261		Madchester	Central Station Design	T-shirt		
FACT 262	Happy Mondays	Madchester – Rave On	Central Station Design	VHS	November 1989	
FAC 263	New Order	Round & Round / Best & Marsh	Peter Saville Associates, Trevor Key	12-inch, CD	February 1989	Remix FAC 263R (12-inch and 3-inch CD)
FACT 264	Durutti Column	Guitar Two – Acoustic		album, unreleased		
FAC 265		United States of the Hacienda		DJ tour	June 1990	Hacienda DJ tour of America during June and July 1990
FACT 266	Steve Martland	Steve Martland	Peter Saville Associates, Neville Brody	LP, CD, cassette, DAT	September 1989	
FACD 267	Revenge	Pineapple Face	Peter Saville Associates	CD single	May 1990	
FAC 268	Northside	Shall We Take a Trip / Moody Places	Central Station Design	7-inch, 12-inch	May 1990	
FAC 269	Kalima	Shine	Johnson/Panas	single		
FAC 270	Various Artists	Our Dance Days		album		planned Mike Pickering project to release a house remixes compilation
FAC 271	New Order	Technique Advertising	Peter Saville Associates	campaign		
FAC 272	Happy Mondays	Step On	Central Station Design	7-inch, 12-inch, CD, cassette	March 1990	
FAC 273	New Order	Run 2 / MTO	Peter Saville Associates	12-inch	August 1989	Limited 20,000 copies on 12-inch
FACT 274	Durutti Column	Obey the Time	8vo	LP, CD, cassette	December 1990	DAT prepared but not commercially released
FACT 275	New Order	Technique	Peter Saville Associates, Trevor Key	LP, cassette, CD	February 1989	
FACD 276	Various Artists	Factory Classical Label	Peter Saville Associates	CD EP	July 1989	promotional sampler
FAC 277	Joy Division	Substance		video concept		
FAC 278	Karl Denver	Indambinigi (Zimba / Shengali)	Central Station Design	12-inch	August 1990	
FAC 279	Revenge	I'm Not Your Slave	Peter Saville Associates	single	October 1990	
FAC 280	The Wendys	More Than Enough		12-inch	November 1990	promo, unreleased
FAC 281		The Area	Trevor Johnson	shop	December 1989	
FAC 282		Flowers for Horse's wedding		event	August 1990	Flowers provided by Factory for Paul Ryder's wedding
FAC 283		World in Motion	Peter Saville Associates	T-shirt		
FAC 284	Durutti Column	The Together Mix / Contra-indications (album version) / Fridays (Up-Person mix)	8vo	single	February 1991	
FACT 285	The Wendys	Gobbledygook	David Knopov	LP, CD	May 1991	
FAC 286	Various Artists	Bloomsbury Classical Showcase		event		
FAC 287	Electronic	Get The Message / Free Will	Johnson/Panas	7-inch, 12-inch, cassette, CD	April 1991	
FAC 287-R	Electronic	Get The Message (DNA Groove Mix) / Get The Message (DNA Sin Mix)	Johnson/Panas	7-inch, 12-inch	April 1991	
FAC 288		Shaun on One	Central Station Design	T-shirt		may never have been produced officially
FAC 289	New Order	Campaign Technique	Peter Saville Associates	notepaper	February 1989	promotional notepaper for FACT 275
FAC 289	The Wendys	The Sun's Going to Shine for Me Soon / Everybody	Craig Easton	7-inch, 12-inch	February 1991	
FACT 290	Electronic	Electronic	Johnson/Panas	album	27 May 1991	
FAC 291		Factory Classical stationery		stationery	1990	
FAC 292	Shaun Ryder	Colours		single, unfinished & unreleased		
FAC 293	Englandneworder	World in Motion	Peter Saville Associates	7-inch, 12-inch	May 1990	Remix FAC 293R
FAC 294	Durutti Column	Jazz FM radio		advertisement		
FAC 295		Xmas Greetings from Factory – Dec 1990		Christmas card	December 1990	1990 Christmas card, photo of the then-new FAC 251
FACD 296	Various Artists	Factory Classical 5-CD Set	Peter Saville Associates	CD box set	September 1989	FACD 226, FACD 236, FACD 246, FACD 256, FACD 266
FAC 297	The Wendys	Pulling My Fingers Off // I Feel Slowly / More Than Enough Instrumental	David Knopov	12-inch	April 1991	
FAC 298	Northside	My Rising Star / Instrumental	Central Station Design	7-inch	October 1990	
FAC 299		Factory	Julian Morey	T-shirt		
FACT 300	New Order	Untitled pre-mix listening tape		album		
FAC 301		Think About the Future Factory Conference		event	5 July 1990	
FAC 302	Happy Mondays	Kinky Afro	Central Station Design	7-inch, 12-inch, CD, cassette	October 1990	
FAC 303	Various Artists	Palatine Lane	Oliver Carrie/Dragon	album	January 1992	
FAC 304	Various Artists	Palatine (The Single)	John Macklin	single	November 1991	
FAC 305-C	Various Artists	The Factory Tape		cassette	March 1991	free cassette with Select magazine
FAC 306	Steve Martland	Glad Day ( Festival of Britain / Fantasy Island / The World is in Heaven)	Bill Smith Studio	12-inch, CD	October 1990	
FAC 306-R	Steve Martland	The World is in Heaven (Extended Dance Version)		12-inch	1990	
FAC 307	Cath Carroll	Moves Like You	Two	12-inch	September 1991	
FAC 308	Northside	Take 5 / Who's To Blame	Central Station Design	7-inch, 12-inch	May 1991	
FAC 309		Hi-Nek		T-shirt		
FACT 310	Northside	Chicken Rhythms	Central Station Design	album	June 1991	
FAC 311		Fourth Generation Notepaper	Julian Morey	stationery		
FAC 312	Happy Mondays	Loose Fit / Bob's Yer Uncle	Central Station Design	7-inch, 12-inch, cassette, CD	February 1991	Remix FAC-312-R; Shadowplayers dates release as March 1991
FAC 313	Joy Division	Transmission Film		video	November 1991	
FAC 314	Various Artists	Palatine – The Factory Story Vol 1. 1979–1982: Tears in Their Eyes	John Macklin	LP, CD, cassette	November 1991	
FAC 315	Cath Carroll	Press kit	Two	press kit	July 1991	includes CD of "Moves Like You" 7-inch radio mix, VHS of "Beast" and "Moves Like You"
FACD 316	I Fagiolini	The Art of Monteverdi	Bill Smith Studio	CD, cassette, DAT	September 1990	
FAC 317	Cath Carroll	England Made Me	John Macklin	badge		Promotional badge for FACT 210
FAC 317	Various Artists	Classics in Motion		event	7 September 1990	Factory Classical showcase with I Fagiolini, Rolf Hind, Graham Fitkin, Red Byrd, Steve Martland, Durutti Column at Tramway Theatre, Glasgow, 7 September 1990
FAC 318	Various Artists	Classics in Motion		event	16 October 1990	Factory Classical showcase with I Fagiolini, Rolf Hind, Graham Fitkin, Red Byrd, Steve Martland, Durutti Column at Haçienda, Manchester, 16 October 1990
FAC 318		Classics in Motion	Peter Saville, Brett Wickens	T-shirt, poster, leaflet		
FAC 318		Flying Start Exhibition Stand		event	May 1991	Stand displaying Factory artwork at Flying Start TV show exhibition
FAC 319	Various Artists	Classics in Motion		event	29 October 1990	Factory Classical showcase with I Fagiolini, Rolf Hind, Graham Fitkin, Red Byrd, Steve Martland, Durutti Column at Bloomsbury Theatre, London, 29–31 October 1990
FAC 319	The Adventure Babies	Camper Van / Barking Mad // Lifetime at the Sink / Long Night Narrow Boat	Central Station Design	12-inch, CD	September 1991	
FAC 320	Happy Mondays	Pills 'n' Thrills and Bellyaches	Central Station Design	LP, CD, cassette	November 1990	
FAC 321	New Order	The Perfect Kiss	Jonathan Demme	video clip	May 1985	promotional clip for FAC 123
FACT 322	Happy Mondays	Live	Central Station Design	CD, 2×LP, cassette	September 1991	The Baby Big Head Bootleg Album bootleg recording was so popular the band released it as an official album
FAC 323	New Order	Untitled	Peter Saville	1989 US tour book	1989	Interview with Peter Saville regarding 'Untitled' Online scan archive, all pages.
FACT 324	Various Artists	Palatine – The Factory Story Vol 2. 1981–1986: Life's a Beach	John Macklin	LP, CD, cassette	November 1991	
FACT 325	Various Artists	Martin: The Work of Martin Hannett	John Macklin	album	August 1991	
FACD 326	Rolf Hind	Country Music	Bill Smith Studio	CD, cassette, DAT	September 1990	
FACD 327	Revenge	Gun World Porn (Deadbeat / Cloud Nine / State of Shock / Little Pig)	John Macklin	CD	1991	
FAC 328	Electronic	Feel Every Beat	3a	7-inch, 12-inch, CD	September 1991	
FAC 329	The Other Two	Tasty Fish	DM	7-inch, 12-inch, cassette, CD	October 1991	
FAC 330	The Other Two	The Other Two & You		album		not released on Factory, eventually released on London
FAC 331		The Temporary Contemporary	Design 3	table	January 1991	Floating boardroom table at FAC 251
FAC 332	Happy Mondays	Judge Fudge / Tokoloshe Man / Stayin' Alive	Central Station Design	7-inch, 12-inch, CD, cassette	November 1991	
FACT 334	Various Artists	Palatine – The Factory Story Vol 3. 1979–1989: The Beat Groups	John Macklin	LP, CD, cassette	November 1991	
FACT 335	The Adventure Babies	Laugh	Central Station Design	LP, CD, cassette	June 1992	
FACD 336	Red Byrd	Songs of Love and Death	Bill Smith Studio	CD, cassette, DAT	September 1990	
FACD 337	The Wendys	I Instruct (Enjoy The Things You Fear / Newspaper Cows / The Pop Song / The Sun's Going To Shine For Me Soon)	John Macklin	EP	September 1991	
FAC 338	Northside	Want a Virgin		single		unreleased
FACT 339		MTV Special: History of Factory		documentary	26 January 1992	
FAC 339		Palatine		VHS	1992	Canada-only VHS of FAC-339
FAC 341	Happy Mondays	Pills 'N' Thrills and Bellyaches Launch		event		
FAC 342	Happy Mondays	Charter Clinic		idea		
FACT 344	Various Artists	Palatine – The Factory Story Vol 4. 1987–1990: Selling Out	John Macklin	LP, CD, cassette	November 1991	
FAC 345		Palatine: The Factory Christmas Gift 1991	John Macklin	booklet	December 1991	Christmas present
FACD 346	Graham Fitkin	Flak	Bill Smith Studio	CD, cassette	September 1990	DAT scheduled but not released
FAC 347	The Adventure Babies	Barking Mad / Captain Scarlet / How Mortal We Are (Mad Hat Mix)	Central Station Design	7-inch, 12-inch, CD	June 1992	
FAC 348	Electronic	Disappointed		single	June 1992	unreleased on Factory, released on Parlophone 12-R-6311 1992
FAC 349	The Other Two	Movin' On		single		planned second single from FAC 330, neither released by Factory
FAC 351	Jon Savage	The Haçienda Must Be Built!	Graham Newman & John Macklin	book	1992	Official history of the Haçienda
FAC 352	Happy Mondays	Staying Alive		single, unreleased		
FAC 354		Palatine Celebrations		event		
FACT 356	Eric Satie	Socrate	Bill Smith Studio	CD, cassette, DAT	1990	
FAC 357	The Adventure Babies	Laugh / Catching Up		12-inch, cassette		Unreleased, though promos were distributed November 1992. Cassette promo numbered FACD-357.
FAC 362-7	Happy Mondays	Stinkin' Thinkin'	Central Station Design	7-inch	September 1992	
FACD 366	Steve Martland	Crossing the Border	John Macklin	CD, cassette	July 1992	
FAC 372-7	Happy Mondays	Sunshine & Love / Staying Alive	Central Station Design	7-inch	November 1992	Chronologically the last ever regular release on Factory Records
FACD 376	Piers Adams	Handel Recorded Sonatas	John Macklin	CD, cassette	September 1990	
FAC 383		The Vikings		hardcore New Order fans		
FAC 384		The Vikings Under Fives		Sons of hardcore New Order fans		
FACD 386	Walter Hus	Muurwerk	John Macklin	CD, cassette	January 1991	
FACT 396	Two Guitarists	Still Life		album		unrecorded, unreleased
FACT 400	Various Artists	Palatine – The Factory Story 1979–1990	John Macklin	LP box, CD box, cassette box	November 1991	includes error-prone Factory and Factory Benelux catalogues
FACT 400V	Various Artists	Palatine – The Free Vid	John Macklin	VHS	November 1991	Free with initial copies of FACT 400 bought from HMV
FAC 400	Joy Division	Transmission		video	November 1991	Promotional video for "Transmission" by Joy Division to promote FACT 400
FAC 401	Michael Winterbottom	24 Hour Party People		film	5 April 2002	fictionalised story of Factory Records
FAC 401		24 Hour Party People	Central Station Technicolour	12-inch		promotional 12-inch for the film, issued to cast and crew
FACD 406	Steve Martland	Wolfgang: Martland plays Mozart	John Macklin	CD, cassette	June 1992	
FAC 413		Jack		magazine	January 2003	Jack magazine January 2003, featuring New Order interview
FACT 420	Happy Mondays	Yes Please!	Central Station Design	CD, LP, cassette	October 1992	
FAC 421		factoryrecords.net website	David Sultan	website		
FAC 424	Anthony H. Wilson	24 Hour Party People	Peter Saville	book		
FACDVD 424		24 Hour Party People	Peter Saville	double DVD	27 January 2003	
FAC 433		24 Hour Party People film website		website		
FAC 441		worldinmotion.net website	David Sultan	website		
FAC 451	Jane Stanton	Love Will Tear Us Apart: A History of the Haçienda		documentary	May 1999	Documentary for Granada Television
FAC 451		Haçienda (reconstruction for 24 Hour Party People film)		set/event		
FAC 461	Matthew Robertson	Factory Records: The Complete Graphic Album		book	13 July 2006	
FAC 471		A Celebration of the Haçienda	Trevor Johnson	event	3 December 2005	at Manchester Academy 1 with Haçienda DJs
FAC 471		A Celebration of Madchester		event	13 May 2006	at Manchester Academy 1
FAC 473		Les Paul FAC 473	Peter Saville	sculpture		
FAC 481		Building magazine: Oh Manchester		magazine	27 January 2006	Building 27 January 2006, guest-edited by Tony Wilson and Yvette Livesey
FAC 491		Haçienda 25		exhibition/event		
FACT 500	Happy Mondays	Uncle Dysfunktional	Central Station Design	CD	3 July 2007	released by Sequel (SEQCD-012), not Factory, but number assigned by Wilson
FAC 501		Anthony H. Wilson's coffin		coffin	August 2007	
FAC 511		And you forgotten a memorial event for Rob Gretton	Trevor Johnson, Peter Saville	event/poster	23 May 2004	
