= A Certain Ratio discography =

- Studio albums: 13
- EPs: 9
- Live albums: 4
- Compilation albums: 8
- Singles: 33
- Remix albums: 2

This is the discography of English post-punk band A Certain Ratio. Since forming in 1977, A Certain Ratio have released 13 studio albums; the first in 1980 with The Graveyard and the Ballroom, and the latest in 2024 with It All Comes Down to This, of which have reached the top-ten of the UK Independent Album Chart. They have also released 9 extended plays and 33 singles, of which seven charted within the top-ten of the UK Independent Singles Chart during the 1980s.

== Albums ==
=== Studio albums ===
Title	Album details	Peak chart positions	
Title	Album details	UK	UK Indie
The Graveyard and the Ballroom	Released: January 1980; Label: Factory; Formats: MC	—	29 (Note: Charted in 1985.)
To Each...	Released: April 1981; Label: Factory; Formats: LP	—	1
Sextet	Released: January 1982; Label: Factory; Formats: LP	52	1
I'd Like to See You Again	Released: November 1982; Label: Factory; Formats: LP	—	2
Force	Released: November 1986; Label: Factory; Formats: CD, LP, MC	—	2
Good Together	Released: 25 September 1989; Label: A&M; Formats: CD, LP, MC	—	—
acr:mcr	Released: July 1990; Label: A&M; Formats: CD, LP, MC	—	—
Up in Downsville	Released: 26 October 1992; Label: Rob's; Formats: CD, LP, MC	—	—
Change the Station	Released: January 1997; Label: Rob's; Formats: CD	—	—
Mind Made Up	Released: November 2008; Label: Le Maquis; Formats: CD; France-only release	—	—
ACR Loco	Released: 24 September 2020; Label: Mute; Formats: CD, LP, MC, digital download	69	5
1982	Released: 31 March 2023; Label: Mute; Formats: CD, LP, MC, digital download	—	3
It All Comes Down to This	Released: 19 April 2024; Label: Mute; Formats: CD, LP, digital download	—	6
"—" denotes releases that did not chart or were not released in that territory.

=== Live albums ===
Title	Album details	Peak chart positions
Title	Album details	UK Indie
Live – America 1985	Released: 1985; Label: Self-release; Formats: MC; Later released on CD and LP in 1987 as Live in America	10 (Note: Charted in 1987.)
Live in Groningen (Holland) 26.10.1980	Released: July 2005; Label: LTM; Formats: CD	—
Loco Live at Hope Mill Studio	Released: 19 August 2022; Label: Mute; Formats: CD, LP, digital download	—
It All Comes Down to Tim Peaks	Released: 4 August 2024; Label: Mute; Formats: LP, digital download	—
"—" denotes releases that did not chart.

=== Remix albums ===
Title	Album details
Looking for a Certain Ratio	Released: August 1994; Label: Creation; Formats: CD, LP, MC
Loco Remezclada	Released: 5 November 2021; Label: Mute; Formats: CD, 2×LP, digital download

=== Compilation albums ===
Title	Album details	Peak chart positions
Title	Album details	UK Indie
The Double 12"	Released: September 1981; Label: Factory; Formats: 2×12"; Australasia and Italy-only release	—
The Old & the New	Released: January 1986; Label: Factory; Formats: LP, MC	3
Early	Released: 22 March 2002; Label: Soul Jazz; Formats: CD, 2×LP	—
B-Sides, Sessions & Rarities	Released: June 2002; Label: Soul Jazz; Formats: 2×10"; Limited release	—
ACR:Perc	Released: 26 November 2016; Label: Mute; Formats: MC; Limited release	—
acr:set	Released: 10 October 2018; Label: Mute; Formats: CD, LP	26
ACR:Box	Released: 3 May 2019; Label: Mute; Formats: 4×CD, 7×LP, digital download	27
EP ACR	Released: 9 September 2022; Label: Mute; Formats: CD	—

== EPs ==
Title	EP details
Greetings Four	Released: September 1987; Label: Materiali Sonori; Formats: 12"; Italy-only release
Four for the Floor	Released: 16 February 1990; Label: A&M; Formats: CD, 12"
Soundstation Volume 1	Released: 1996; Label: Rob's; Formats: CD, 12"
Soundstation Volume 2	Released: April 1997; Label: Rob's; Formats: 12"
Fila Brazillia Versus A Certain Ratio	Released: 22 April 2003; Label: Twentythree; Formats: CD, 12"
Dirty Boy & Shack Up Remixed	Released: 6 September 2019; Label: Mute; Formats: 12"; Limited release
ACR:EPA	Released: 7 May 2021; Label: Mute; Formats: 12", digital download
ACR:EPC	Released: 2 July 2021; Label: Mute; Formats: 12", digital download
ACR:EPR	Released: 13 August 2021; Label: Mute; Formats: 12", digital download
2023 EP	Released: 22 August 2023; Label: Mute; Formats: 12", digital download
Christmasville UK EP	Released: 11 December 2024; Label: Mute; Formats: 12", digital download

== Singles ==
Title	Year	Peak chart positions			Album
Title	Year	UK	UK Indie	US Dance	Album
"All Night Party"	1979	—	—	—	The Graveyard and the Ballroom
"Shack Up" (Belgium-only release)	1980	—	—	—	Non-album single
"Flight"	1980	—	7	—	The Graveyard and the Ballroom
"Do the Du (Casse)"/"Shack Up" (US-only release)	1981	—	—	46	The Graveyard and the Ballroom
"Waterline"	1981	—	10	—	Non-album singles
"Abracadubra" (as Sir Horatio)	1982	—	—	—	Non-album singles
"Guess Who?" (Belgium-only release)	1982	—	23 (Note: Charted due to import sales.)	—	I'd Like to See You Again
"Knife Slits Water"	1982	—	3	—	Sextet
"I Need Someone Tonite"	1983	—	8	—	Non-album singles
"Life's a Scream"	1984	—	6	—	Non-album singles
"Brazilia" (Belgium and France-only release)	1984	—	13	—	Non-album singles
"Wild Party"	1985	—	4	—	Non-album singles
"Mickey Way (The Candy Bar)"	1986	—	9	—	Force
"Bootsy" (Australia-only release)	1987	—	—	—	Force
"The Big E (I Won't Stop Loving You)"	1989	96	—	—	Good Together
"Backs to the Wall"	1989	—	—	—	Good Together
"Your Blue Eyes"	1989	—	—	—	Good Together
"Good Together"	1990	81	—	—	Good Together
"Won't Stop Loving You"	1990	55	—	—	acr:mcr
"Loosen Up Your Mind"	1991	—	—	—	Non-album singles
"Twenty Seven Forever"	1991	—	—	—	Non-album singles
"Mello"	1992	—	—	—	Up in Downsville
"Turn Me On"	1993	—	—	—	Up in Downsville
"Tekno"	1993	—	—	—	Up in Downsville
"Dirty Boy" (featuring Barry Adamson)	2018	—	—	—	acr:set
"Make It Happen"	2018	—	—	—	acr:set
"W.S.L.U."	2019	—	—	—	ACR:Box
"Houses in Motion"	2019	—	—	—	ACR:Box
"Friends Around Us" (limited release)	2020	—	—	—	ACR Loco
"Always in Love"	2020	—	—	—	ACR Loco
"Yo Yo Gi"	2020	—	—	—	ACR Loco
"Berlin"	2020	—	—	—	ACR Loco
"YoYoGrip" (featuring Jacknife Lee and Maria Uzor)	2020	—	—	—	ACR:EPC EP
"—" denotes releases that did not chart or were not released in that territory.
