= Early (A Certain Ratio album) =

Compilation album by A Certain Ratio
- Released: 22 March 2002
- Label: Soul Jazz
- Compilers: Adrian Self; Stuart Baker

A Certain Ratio chronology
Change the Station (1997)	Early (2002)	Mind Made Up (2008)

Early is a compilation album by the English post-punk band A Certain Ratio, released on 22 March 2002 by Soul Jazz Records.

== Content ==
The album includes songs by A Certain Ratio between their formation in 1978 and 1985. Dave Simpson of The Guardian described A Certain Ratio's sound as "a combination of [Brian] Eno ambience, Wire post-punk, George Clinton funk and later, Latin percussion".

== Release ==
Early was released on 22 March 2002 by Soul Jazz Records.

== Critical reception ==
Professional ratings
Review scores
Source	Rating
AllMusic	4/5 stars
The Guardian	4/5 stars
Uncut	4/5 stars

Andy Kellman of AllMusic gave the album a four star rating out of a potential five, noting that four songs are presented in two versions, which led to "eating up space that could have been taken up by other highlights." while concluding that "All things considered, there is no shortage of great material here, and the packaging is phenomenal." Simpson also gave the album a four star rating, noting that tracks "The Fox" and "Life's a Scream" "would have been massive hits". Matt Harvey of the BBC commented that "on listening to these tracks you can see why house music, as the 80s progressed, found a spiritual home in Manchester (it's not for nothing that Andy Weatherall cites ACR as his favourite band). Tracks like "Knife Slits Water" kick in a way that makes you think Joey Beltram might have spent his school holidays visiting a trendy uncle in Manchester." David Stubbs of Uncut referred to the album as a "sorely overdue CD release, in particular for the long unavailable material from their first two EPs" while noting that "A pity 1981's To Each... is so under-represented here – "Forced Laugh'" would have topped off this collection perfectly."

== Track listing ==
Disc one: Early

1. "Do the Du" – 2:49
2. "Flight" – 6:04
3. "Waterline" – 4:07
4. "Shack Up" – 3:13
5. "The Fox" – 3:03
6. "Blown Away" – 3:11
7. "Gum" – 3:01
8. "Life's a Scream" – 6:32
9. "Skipscada" – 2:06
10. "Knife Slits Water" – 7:32
11. "Sounds Like Something Dirty" – 6:54
12. "Touch" – 5:03
13. "Saturn" – 3:48

Disc two: B-Sides, Rarities & Sessions

1. "All Night Party" (original 7" single) – 3:13
2. "Faceless" (Graveyard & Ballroom) – 2:18
3. "Do the Du" (John Peel session, 1979) – 2:41
4. "All Night Party" (John Peel session, 1979) – 3:47
5. "Flight" (John Peel session, 1979) – 3:15
6. "Choir" (John Peel session, 1979) – 3:05
7. "Skipscada" (John Peel session, 1981) – 2:04
8. "Felch" (Original NYC Mix) – 3:43
9. "Abracadubra" (Sir Horatio 12") – 3:31
10. "Tumba Rhumba" (7" single B-side) – 2:34
11. "Si Fermir o Grido" (Touch cassette) – 3:22
12. "Tribeca" (video) – 11:52
