= Mark Reeder =

British musician and producer

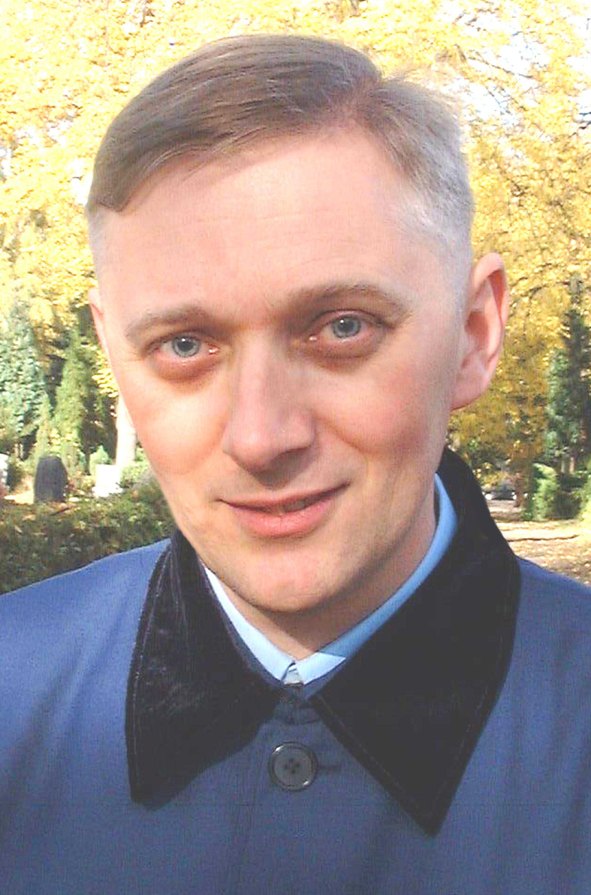
- Reeder in 1999

Background information
- Born: 5 January 1958 (age 68)
- Genres: Electronic, dance, punk rock, experimental
- Occupations: Musician, record producer
- Years active: 1978–present
- Website: Mark Reeder on Facebook

Mark Reeder (born 5 January 1958) is a British musician and record producer. He grew up in Manchester, England. At a young age, Reeder became interested in progressive rock and especially early electronic music. In his teens, he worked in a small Virgin Records store in Manchester city centre.

Reeder has been living and working in Berlin since 1978. He is the founder and owner of the German electronic dance music labels MFS and Flesh. In 1991, Reeder discovered the teenage Paul van Dyk, guiding and paving his way to build up his now international DJ superstardom. Dave Haslam's book Adventures on the Wheels of Steel: The Rise of the Superstar DJs describes how Reeder initiated and successfully outlined van Dyk's early career from 1991 until 1999, and through Reeder's respected status and extensive music industry contacts, van Dyk was able to climb the ladder to success and reach his current superstar status.

Reeder's career has spanned more than four decades. He has been a participant and behind the scenes influence for many now-famous artists, spread over a wide cross-section of contemporary musical genres. Due to his extensive knowledge of the music industry, he has participated and chaired panels at various international music conferences since the late 1980s.

== Background ==
Mark Reeder formed the punk band The Frantic Elevators together with Mick Hucknall (Simply Red) and Neil Moss in Manchester, early 1977. In 1978, he decided to leave Britain and move to West Berlin. While living there he became Factory Records' German representative, promoting the label's bands, Joy Division and A Certain Ratio. Simultaneously he worked as a sound engineer for bands including all-girl avant garde group Malaria! (who he also co-managed) and punk band Die Toten Hosen.

In 1981, Reeder formed the synthpop-rock duo Die Unbekannten, together with Alistair Gray, and then drummer Thomas Wydler (who later played in Die Haut and Nick Cave and the Bad Seeds) joined, Die Unbekannten became a trio. After Wydler left to play in Die Haut, he still remained as Die Unbekannten guest drummer for the occasional live gig.

They released two very dark and depressive 12" EPs between 1981 and 1982: a debut EP, Die Unbekannten (1981) which consisted of 3 tracks "Radio war", "Casualties", and "Poseidon", Their second EP Dangerous Moonlight (1982) which had 4 tracks, "Don't Tell me Stories", "Perfect Love", "Against the Wall" and "The Game". Dangerous Moonlight was repressed with a different cover design in 1983.

In March 2005, Die Unbekannten released the limited edition vinyl LP Don't Tell Me Stories (on vinyl only) featuring the above 2 EPs and some unreleased material.

A music review concluded that

Die Unbekannten is of course an 80's band. They combine the best of new wave, gothic rock and post-punk.

Meanwhile, the 2008 film Smirnoff Wall of Sound described Reeder as one of the godfathers of the early electronic music and gothic rock scene.

In 1983, Reeder helped put together the Berlin special of The Tube, a UK Channel 4 TV pop programme, which he co-presented together with Muriel Gray. This show featured music from both sides of the walled city (debuting bands like Die Ärzte and featuring Die Tödliche Doris and Die Haut) and for the first time ever, a young East German band he'd literally discovered on the street, called Jessica, appeared on a UK TV show, fronted by Tino Eisbrenner. It was also the first time that a British TV crew had ever filmed a pop programme both in the GDR (East Berlin) and West Berlin.

In 1984, Die Unbekannten changed their name to Shark Vegas and toured Western Europe with New Order. In 1986, Shark Vegas released one of the most sought-after factory 12" singles, "You Hurt Me" (FAC111) which was produced by Bernard Sumner, a founding member of Joy Division, New Order, and later Bad Lieutenant. This single was also released in Germany on the Toten Hosen Totenkopf label (TOT11) with different versions of the song. Both releases of the single were some of the first 12" to be designed by Mark Farrow, who went on to design covers for The Pet Shop Boys.

The only other track, "Pretenders of Love",(FAC US 17) was featured on the only US factory compilation.

Reeder had contacts in the East Berlin underground new wave music scene and travelled a lot to East Berlin for concerts. He eventually helped to bring Die Toten Hosen over to East Berlin for their two secret gigs in 1982 and 1988, the 1982 gig being the first concert by a western punk band in East Berlin, disguised as a religious service. In the summer of 1989, he was officially asked if he would produce the album Torture, for up-and-coming East German indie band Die Vision for the East German state-owned record label AMIGA in East Berlin. This was probably the first east–west joint venture. Reeder is recognised as the only Englishman ever to have had the privilege to make a record in the East, because literally days after finishing recording the album, the notorious Berlin Wall fell.

Due to this album production, Reeder had made useful contacts at AMIGA, the former East German state-owned record label, now renamed ZONG. He managed to convince them to allow him to set up a new electronic dance label office in the Abhör Raum 101, situated in the building directly behind the Reichstag.

== MFS – Masterminded for Success ==
In December 1990, Reeder founded his own electronic dance music record label, Masterminded For Success, later known as MFS. The name MFS was taken from the initials of the Ministry for State Security (Stasi) in East Germany.

Reeder had a gift for uncovering the hidden talents of many early techno and trance artists. He once stated in an interview together with DJ Paul van Dyk,

MFS was founded to offer opportunity to talented people.

As an artist himself, Reeder was the creative driving force behind his labels, which provided a great platform for many young and then-unknown artists. He ran both his labels with an unconventional approach and a passion rarely seen in the music industry. Reeder was deeply devoted to all his artists and was involved in almost every aspect of their musical productions, from their concept, recording and mastering, to PR texts, as well as their artistic cover design ideas.

In 1993, a trance music documentary, Berliner Trance, was born, presented by Mark Reeder and directed by Ben Hardyment.

This documentary is combined with interviews such as Dr Motte, Paul van Dyk, Laurent Garnier, Paul Browse, Mijk van Dijk and MFS label supremo Mark Reeder. This now-legendary exploration into the underworld of what was the most significant force in driving dance music forward in the 20th century. It contains rare early footage of the 1991 and 1993 Love Parade, and of the now bulldozed Mutoid Waste Company land, E-Werk and Tresor – Berlin's legendary clubs that started it all in the former East Berlin.

Reeder reactivated MFS in 2018, specifically to release the album Fragment by Chinese band STOLEN.

== Current music works ==
In the meantime, Reeder has returned to his own music production. He worked with German filmmaker Joerg Buttgereit on many of his film and theatre projects. In 1991, Reeder starred in the Buttgereit splatter film Nekromantik 2 and his sound is reminiscent of the 80s electronic rock-disco sound with a modern flair.

Reeder has since remixed tracks and worked with many well-known artists like the Pet Shop Boys & Sam Taylor-Wood "I'm in Love With a German Film Star" 2009 (Mark Reeder's Rundfunk remix), (Mark Reeder's Rias Radio Remix) and (Mark Reeder's Stuck in the 80s remix), Bad Lieutenant "Sink or Swim" 2010 (Reeder's Rettungsring Remix) and (Reeder's Waterwing Remix), Anne Clark "The Hardest Heart" (Heart and soul mix feat. Anne Clark), John Foxx "Underpass" 2010 (Reeder Sinister Subway Mix), (Mark Reeder's dark long sinister remix), (Mark Reeder Sinister Subway Radio remix) and other less known ones such as Noblesse Oblige, Spartak and Parralox.

=== Reordered ===
In September 2009, he released a collaboration album of reworks of tracks by Blank & Jones titled Reordered for which he rewrote and replayed all the tracks.

According to Reeder

Reordered could probably best be described as a re-works album as I've taken each track and basically rewritten and reworked the music and added my own sound imprint. It was decided to make it in a style reminiscent of the 80's and I produced it in exactly the same way as I had made music back then; using very few instruments, real synths and guitars. I wanted Reordered to have a different sound to anything Blank & Jones had done before and to touch territory they wouldn't normally visit.

This album features vocals by artists as Robert Smith of The Cure, Steve Kilbey of The Church, Bernard Sumner of Joy Division, New Order, and Bad Lieutenant, Claudia Bruecken of Propaganda and Anne Clark.

=== Five Point One ===
In December 2011, Reeder released his second studio album Five Point One, a selection of his recent remixes.

All the tracks on this three-disc deluxe album have been re-remixed by Reeder in Dolby Digital 5.1 Surround Sound.

Notably, the album also includes his previously unreleased remix for Depeche Mode's "Sweetest Perfection" (Reeder's Sweetest Conception Remix) which is exclusive to this album, as are his two remixes for Anne Clark's "Full Moon" (Reeder's Stairway to the Stars Remix) and "If..." (Reeder's Seemingly Forever Remix). The album also features two further remixes for Bad Lieutenant's "Twist of Fate" and remixes for top German rockers Die Toten Hosen, teutonic trancers Blank & Jones and New York electro-jazzer Vanessa Daou, as well as the aforementioned Pet Shop Boys and John Foxx remixes. It also features a collection of videos and photos, such as a rare Depeche Mode photograph by Anton Corbijn.

=== Collaborator ===
In April 2014 Reeder released his third studio album Collaborator through Factory Benelux. As well as remixes of tracks by Bad Lieutenant, Pet Shop Boys & Sam Taylor-Wood, Westbam, Marnie, Blank & Jones, Marsheaux and Koishii & Hush, the collection also included material by Reeder's own groups Shark Vegas and Die Unbekannten. Six of the thirteen tracks feature vocals by Bernard Sumner.

== Music workshop, lecture & seminar sessions ==
Due to his extensive knowledge of the music industry, Reeder has participated and chaired panels at various international music conferences since the late 1980s. One of his first, being for the BID (Berlin Independence Days) in 1990, together with the Sex Pistols creator Malcolm McLaren and music writers Dave Rimmer and Jon Savage.

Other conferences include chairing panels at ADE (Amsterdam Dance Event) on various techno music subjects, together with guest panellists Ben Liebrand, Ferry Corsten, Mark Gobulev and Jaydee. And join the "Musik & Maschine" International Techno Fair together with techno DJ Jeff Mills in Berlin. Reeder attended the first electronic dance music conference VIBRATO 2000 in New Delhi, India, and then London Calling in UK. He has given lectures and workshops at the Tecnogeist, San Luis Potosi and G. Martell College of Music and Audio in Mexico City.

- 30 May 2012: Dreaming New Futures participation as panelist/ guest speaker for dBs music networking conference.
- 7 June 2012: Der Klang Der Familie panel at Tresor Berlin/ Berlin Tresor Exhibition, Red Gallery, London.

== Artworks & designs ==
Reeder initially studied advertising design, but disillusioned, left the ad industry to work in a Virgin Records store in Lever Street, Manchester. Years later, he used his knowledge in advertising and design for his own labels MFS and Flesh, as well as for his own releases (with the exception of "You Hurt Me" which was designed by his friend Mark Farrow).

Reeder created all his labels' adverts and also wrote the majority of the copy and record texts. He additionally supplied designer Marc Schilkowski with design ideas, although Reeder almost never credited himself on the records (Schilkowski is the one actually credited for the execution of the finished artwork on most MFS releases).

Reeder was actually involved in the creation of virtually all the MFS and Flesh record graphic designs:

- EP design: (1981) Die Unbekannten Die Unbekannten; (1982) & (1983) Die Unbekannten Dangerous Moonlight
- Single design: (1989) Alien Nation "Travis" – by Mark Reeder & Dave Rimmer; (1991) Alien Nation "Lovers of the World"
- Album design: (1989) & (1990) Die Vision Torture – by Mark Reeder & Dave Rimmer; (1998) Assorted E for Europe – by Mark Reeder & Corvin Dalek; (1999) Assorted Stadtansichten – a Journey Through Berlin – by Mark Reeder & Corvin Dalek; (2001) Blue Amazon Javelin – by Mark Reeder & Corvin Dalek; (2002) Wet & Hard Various, Flesh Artists compilation – by Mark Reeder, Jan Kessler & Corvin Dalek; (2003) Flesh For Fantasy Various, Flesh Artists Compilation – by Mark Reeder & Jan Kessler; (2003) Tender Young Flesh Various, Flesh Artists Compilation – by Mark Reeder & Jan Kessler; (2003) Corvin Dalek I am a Dalek – by Mark Reeder & Corvin Dalek; (2005) Die Unbekannten Don't Tell Me Stories – by Mark Reeder & Anja Koestler; (2009) Blank & Jones/ Mark Reeder – Reordered – by Mark Reeder & Marc Schilkowski.

== Discography ==
=== As producer ===
Production credits

- 1982: Malaria! "Emotion" Album tracks "Eifersucht" and "Gewissen" – Moabit Musik, Berlin/Les Disques du Crepuscule, Brussels
- 1989 & 1990: Die Vision "Torture" (Album) "After The Sunset", "Gimme All Your Love", "Cry of the Wolf", "Doomsday", "Wishes for the night", "The vision", "Love By Geyer remix", "Love By Waiah remix" – Amiga/Zong & Vulture Records
- 1997: Paul van Dyk "Words" (Original Version radio edit) by Paul van Dyk, Wolfgang Ragwitz & Mark Reeder – MFS
- 2013: Queen of Hearts – "Wicked Game"

=== As composer & producer ===
Discography: Shark Vegas

- 1981: Die Unbekannten "Radio War" (Live) featured on LP "Licht und Schatten – 17 June 1981"
- 1981: Die Unbekannten "Die Unbekannten" EP "Radio War", "Casualties" and "Poseidon" Feat. Thomas Wydler on drums. – Monogam Schallplatten, Berlin
- 1982, 1983: Die Unbekannten "Dangerous Moonlight" EP "Don't Tell Me Stories" Feat. Danny Briottet on percussion;

"Perfect Love", "Against The Wall" Feat. Thomas Wydler on drums; "the Game" – Monogam Schallplatten, Berlin

- 1988: Alien Nation "House in the Desert" (Sheik It Up Mix), (Bass House in the Desert) and (Space House in the Desert) – Orgon Records
- 1990: Nekromantik 2 Original Film Soundtrack – Composer & Producer – Jelinski/Buttgereit productions
- 2004: Nekromantik 2 Original Film Soundtrack – Composer & Producer (Re-release of entire remastered original film-score)
- 2007: Captain Berlin Vs Hitler (Theatre Play) Live on-stage Sound Effects and Musical Soundtrack
- 2009: Blank & Jones, Mark Reeder – Reordered (Album) – Soundcolours
- 2013: Queen of Hearts – "United"
- 2014: Queen of Hearts – "Suicide" (featured on LP "Cocoon")
- 2014: Stuart Orchard – Unintended Consequences
- 2015: B-Movie: Lust and Sound in West Berlin 1979–1989 Soundtrack & Score – DEF Media, Edel:Motion Film
- 2018: STOLEN – Fragment (Album) – MFS
- 2019: Alanas Chosnau – Losing my mind (Call of the Wolf mix), Mark Reeder – Tragic (Push the Button mix) features on the French cold war thriller film Chant du Loup soundtrack – Milan Records

=== Remixes ===
1993
- Effective Force "Illuminate The Planet" (World Order Remixes), (New World Order mix), (World in Order mix) and (World Disorder – Mad Marks Mad, Mad World mix) – MFS

1994

- Mystic Force vs Effective Force "Everglade" (Effective Force Remix by Mark Reeder & Effective Force) – MFS

2000

- Corvin Dalek "Crystal" (Hustler & Stossdaempfers Donner & Sumner remix) Written by Corvin Dalek, Mark Reeder & Bernard Sumner. Produced by Corvin Dalek & Mark Reeder. Vocals by Bernard Sumner.

2003

- Corvin Dalek "I am a dalek" (Album)
- Eiven Major "Thunderbird" (Kessler & Reeder's Blue Thunder remix)

2008

- Blank & Jones (featuring Bernard Sumner) "Miracle Cure" (Radiant Radio remix), (Wundermittel remix) – Soundcolours
- Sam Taylor-Wood "I'm in Love With a German Film Star" produced by Pet Shop Boys (Mark Reeder's Rundfunk remix), (Mark Reeder's Rias Radio Remix), (Mark Reeder's Stuck in the 80s remix) and (5.1 Rundfunk remix) – Kompakt
- Anne Clark "Full moon" (Stairway to the Stars Radio mix), (Stairway to the Stars mix)
- Anne Clark "If..." (Seemingly Forever mix)
- Parralox "Sharper Than a Knife" (Cutting Edge remix)

2009

- Spartak "Let's Go Get'em" (No Pain, No Gain mix)
- Noblesse Oblige "duel" (Shot at Dawn remix)
- Die Toten Hosen "Disco" (Lange Hosen remix)
- Anne Clark "The Hardest Heart" (Heart and soul mix feat. Anne Clark)
- Bad Lieutenant, "Sink or Swim" (Reeder's Rettungsring Remix) and (Reeder's Waterwing Remix), (Rubberring Dub Instr remix)

2010

- Bad Lieutenant, "Sink or Swim" (Rettungsring 5.1 Video remix)
- John Foxx "Underpass" (Mark Reeder Sinister Subway Radio remix) and (Mark Reeder's Dark Long Sinister remix)
- Bad Lieutenant, "Twist of Fate" (Mark Reeder's Led's Twist Again remix), (Mark Reeder's Synth of Fate remix), (Mark Reeder's No Fate remix) and (Mark Reeder's No Fate Radio mix)
- Marsheaux "So Far" (Mark Reeder's So Close remix) – Undo Records
- May68 "The Prisoner" (Mark Reeder's Runaway Radio remix) and (Mark Reeder's Runaway remix) – Kitsune Records
- Electrobelle "Falling" (Mark Reeder's in Your Arms remix) and (Mark Reeder's in Your Heart remix)

2011

- Echoes "Ice Cold" (Mark Reeder's Cold As Ice remix), "Ice Cold" (Mark Reeder's Colder Than Ice remix)
- Depeche Mode "Sweetest Perfection" (Mark Reeder's Sweetest Conception remix)
- Mark Reeder "Five Point One" (Remixes album compilation in 5.1 Dolby Digital Surround Sound & Stereo)

2013

- WestBam feat. Bernard Sumner – She Wants (Mark Reeder's Oldschool remix)
- Koishii & Hush feat. Duran Duran bassist John Taylor on vocals – C'est tout est noir (Mark Reeder's Black Night remix)
- Queen of Hearts – Neon (Electrically Excited Remix)

2014

- Marnie – Sugarland (Sweet & Sticky Remix)
- Rusty Egan – Welcome to the Dancefloor (Willkommen im Klub Remix)

2015

- Modern Family Unit – Mmhh Mmh Aahh (Uummhh & Aarrgghh Remix)

2016

- New Order – Singularity (Mark Reeder's Individual Remix)

2017

- New Order – Academic (Mark Reeder's Akademixxx)
- New Order – The Game (Mark Reeder Spielt Mit Version)
- The KVB – White Walls (Mark Reeder's Stoned Wall Remix)

2018

- Liars – Staring at Zero (Mark Reeder's Thousand Yards Stare Remix)
- Blank & Jones (featuring Bobo) "Perfect Silence" (Mark Reeder's Perfect Moment Mix)

2019

- STOLEN – Chaos (Downtown in Chinatown Remix)

=== Studio albums ===
Album title	Date	Label	Format	Catalog
Reordered	18 September 2009	Soundcolours	CD, digital download	SC 0018
Five Point One	16 December 2011	Kennen	CD, DVD, digital download	Kennen 601106
Collaborator	19 May 2014	Factory Benelux	CD	FBN-111-CD
Mauerstadt	14 July 2017	Kennen, MFS	CD, Vinyl, digital download	Kennen 601298

== Films, TV and music documentaries ==
=== Lead role in films ===
- Nekromantik 2 (1991)
- B-Movie: Lust & Sound in West-Berlin 1979–1989 (2015)

=== Guest appearances in films and theatre projects ===
- 1985 "Moskito" Children's TV series (SFB) (German) regular appearances, role as resident "Blunderer"
- 1986 "Ezra Pound" (ZDF) German TV Film on the life of ezra pound. small role as: one of Ezra Pound intellectual drinking friends.
- 1986 "Molle mit Korn" (ARD) Soap-series about set in post-war Germany role as: Russian & English occupying soldier.
- 1988 "Der Todesking" role as: brutal Nazi Officer. Directed by Jörg Buttgereit. Joerg Buttgereit/ Manfred Jelinski production.
- 1989 "Joan of Arc of Mongolia" role as: waiter on trans-siberian railway. Directed by Ulrike Ottinger, Ulrike Ottinger productions.
- 1989 "The Rose Garden" Der Rosengarten brief role as: concentration camp inmate. Directed by Fons Rademakers.
- 1991 "The Party: Nature Morte" role as: drunk party guest. Directed by Cynthia Beatt (ZDF)
- 2009 "Captain Berlin vs. Hitler" (DVD) Music score, Sound effects & Commentary. directed by Jörg Buttgereit & Thilo Gosejohann.(Media-Target Film Berlin)

=== TV documentaries ===
- 1966 "The Good Morning Britain Report" (GRANADA ITV, UK) on schools in North West England, interviewee on dreams.
- 1968 "This England" (GRANADA ITV UK) Report on schools in North West England, interviewee on art/painting.
- 1984 "Red Herrings – West" (BBC TV) Report on life in West Berlin researcher/presenter.
- 1984 "Red Herrings Peace aDDRess" (BBC TV) Report on life in East Berlin, also featuring band Jessica (one year later after the tube) as researcher/translator
- 1984 "Berlin Ett Tillstand" (SWTV 1) Swedish TV – documentary researcher/interviewee
- 1994 "Channel Hopping" Documentary on life and living in Berlin. Researcher & Interviewee (BBC TV)
- 2014 "The Sound of Change – Berlin, Techno, and the Fall of the Wall" The year 2014 marks the 25th anniversary of the fall of the Berlin Wall. This 52-minute documentary looks at the rise of Techno as the soundtrack to the reunification of Germany (ARTE TV)- Interviewee

=== Music documentaries ===
- 1981 "Der Grosse Untergangs Show" (Tempodrom) Genial Dilletanten festival in Berlin (4 September 1981) live concert with "Die Unbekannten" and others super8/ VHS
- 1983 "The Tube – Berlin Special" (Tyne Tees TV/ Channel 4) Researcher/organiser and co-presenter with Muriel Gray.
- 1985 "Musikbox – Berlin Special" (MusicBox/ German Cable) opening event of German cable TV live open air performance of "Shark Vegas" (SV was the first thing people saw on German cable TV) Researcher/Performer.
- 1993 "Berliner Trance" Trance music documentary. Researcher & Presenter/Interviewee. Directed by Ben Hardyment Moist Productions UK
- 1995 "John Peel – Travels with My Camera" (1996) Researcher/Interviewee (Channel 4)
- 1997 "Tresor (anniversary documentary)" Interviewee (MuteFilms)
- 2008 "We Call it Techno" Documentary about the Germany's early Techno scene and culture 1988–1993. Interviewee and Contributor. A film by Maren Sextro & Holger Wick(Sense music media DVD)
- 2008 "Smirnoff 10 Berlin Wall of Sound" directed by Audette Garibay Tafich (Smirnoff Experience TV)
- 2009 Nick Cave and the Bad Seeds "From her to Eternity" (Special 5.1 edition) "Do you love me like I love you" (part 1, From her to Eternity)

"The Firstborn is Dead" (special 5.1 edition) "Do you love me like I love you" (part 2, the firstborn is dead)

"Kicking against the pricks" (special 5.1 edition) "Do you love me like I love you" (part 3, kicking against the pricks)

"Your funeral... My trial" (Special 5.1 edition) "Do you love me like I love you" (part 4, your funeral... my trial)

Interviewee. A film by Iain Forsyth and Jane Pollard (Mute Recordings)

- 2009 "Sub Berlin" documentary about the Tresor Club in Berlin. Interviewee. Directed by Tillmann Kuenzel.
- 2010 Nick Cave and the Bad Seeds "The Good Son" (special 5.1 edition) "Do you love me like I love you" (part 6, the good son) Interviewee. by Iain Forsyth and Jane Pollard (Mute Recordings)
- 2015 B-Movie: Lust & Sound in West Berlin 1979–1989

A spectacular documentary film about the island of West Berlin during the 80s viewed by protagonist Mark Reeder. Using original music and featuring rare and unseen footage with participants such as Gudrun Gut, Blixa Bargeld or Nick Cave, it portrays the vibrant avant-garde music scene of the city in its last decade of division. Reeder composed the soundtrack and remastered the songs. The film was debuted at the Berlinale 2015.

== Print publications ==
Reeder occasionally writes film, DVD and music review for various magazines, such as Stadtkomplize in Berlin, Laif magazine in Poland, B:EAST magazine and XMAG & Bassline in the Czech Republic. He is also a regular contributor to the Time Out Guide – Berlin.

He has also worked as a researcher and has been interviewed and quoted or being a main subject in many book publications. See below for Reeder's participant bibliography.

=== Bibliography ===
- 1986: "Alias David Bowie" by Peter & Leni Gillmann (Researcher/ consultant).
- 1987: "Berlin Zoo Station" (Adventures in East & West Berlin) by Ian Walker (interviewee/subject).
- 1987–1988: "Ich und mein Staubsauger" (Magazine)(Regular Feature Contributor, Occasional cover, Advert, Gig-Poster & Honecker Hampelmann Designer).
- 1991: "Comrade Rockstar" (the search for Dean Read) by Reggie Nadelson (Researcher).
- 1992: "Once Upon a Time in the East" by Dave Rimmer (Active Participant/ Subject). "Moerderinnen im Film" by Frauenfilm initiative (subject). "Film Extremes" by Ken Miller (subject).
- 1994: "Tekno" by Sam Inkinen (Subject).
- 1995: "Localizer 1.0" (the Techno House Book) die gestalten/various (Subject/ Interviewee).
- 1996: "Berlin Unwrapped" (CD comp/book) recipe for "Reeder's Digestive Biscuits" (Creator/ Author).
- 1998: "Sex, Murder, Art" by David Kerekes (Subject).
- 2001: "Adventures on the Wheels of Steel" (The Rise of the Superstar DJs) by Dave Hasslam (Interviewee/ Subject).
- 2005: "Not Abba" by Dave Hasslam (Interviewee/ Subject).
- 2006: "Torn Apart: The Life of Ian Curtis" by Mick Middles & Lindsay Reade Omnibus Press ISBN 1844498263 (Interviewee/ Photograph)
- 2007: "Fotoreportage23" – In Search of Ian Curtis by Katja Ruge (Front & Back cover Photographs/ Interviewee).
- 2007: "Nekromantik" – by Joerg Buttgereit & others (Subject)
- 2007: "Necrosexuality, Perversion, and 'Jouissance': The Experimental Desires of Jörg Buttgereit's 'NekRomantik' Films" by P. MacCormack (Subject)
- 2008: "The Book of Lists – Horror" by Wallace, Howison & Bradley (Subject).
- 2010: "Ich Weiss Nicht" by Jürgen Teipel (Interviewee/ Inspiration).
- 2012: "der klang der familie" – Berlin, Techno and the Fall of the Wall by Felix Denk & Sven von Thülen (Interviewee)
- 2013: "Mehr als laut" by Jürgen Teipel (Interviewee)
- 2016: SO36 (1978 bis heute) by Sub Opus 36 e. V. (Interviewee)
- 2016: 100 Objects (Berlin during the cold war) by Marion Bayer (Exhibition Catalogue)
- 2017: Afterpunk Highlights by Tony Leduc-Gugnalons (Interviewee)
- 2017: City Primeval (New York, Berlin, Prague) by Robert Carithers & Louis Armand (Interviewee)
- 2019: Der Platz (Stories from the death strip) by Constanze Suhr (HG) (Interviewee)
- 2019: Ost-Berlin (30 Explorations) by Jürgen Danyl (HG) (Interviewee)
