= Shark Vegas =

German New Wave band

Shark Vegas was a Berlin based new wave band, consisting of ex-Factory Records German representative, Mark Reeder (guitar/tapes/keyboards), Alistair Gray (vocals), Leo Walter (drums/percussion) and Helmut Wittler (bass/keyboards). Previously Reeder and Grey were known as "Die Unbekannten" together with their drummer Tommy Wiedler (now with Nick Cave's Nick Cave and the Bad Seeds) they later used drum machines and sequencers. Die Unbekannten are credited with making the first record with a Roland TR-606.

Today Reeder runs a string of record labels, including MFS and Flesh, launching the careers of Paul van Dyk and Corvin Dalek.

Shark Vegas reinvented themselves with two new members, Walter and Wittler, for a New Order European tour in 1984.

"You Hurt Me" was one of their concert favorites, and Bernard Sumner of New Order wanted to release the track as a single. He also played guitar at the closing moments of the track. Sumner co-produced the track with A Certain Ratio's Donald Johnson, who also added vocals to the track. A different version to this single was also released on Die Toten Hosen's label "Totenkopf".

A later Shark Vegas track, "Pretenders of Love", can also be found on the Factory US compilation album, Young, Popular & Sexy (Fac US 17).

== Discography ==
- 1984: "You Hurt Me" ("You Hurt Me"), ("You Hurt Me For The First Time") and ("You Hurt Me For The Last Time") (Totenkopf Schallplatten, Düsseldorf)
- 1985: "You Hurt Me" ("But Now Your Flesh Lies Rotting In Hell"), ("You Hurt Me" - Demo Version) produced by Bernard Sumner and Shark Vegas (Factory Records Manchester. FACT 111)
- 1986: "11th March" (from Cynthia Beatts' film, The Party - Original film soundtrack)
- 1986: "Love Habit" ("Don't Walk Away")
- 1987: "Pretenders of Love" (US Factory compilation album - Young, Popular & Sexy) (Fact-US 17)
- 2009, 2011: "Pretenders of Love" (Re-released track featured on the compilation albums Factory Records 1984) (Itm 2534) and FAC.DANCE (Strut087)
