= Corvin Dalek =

Hungarian techno musician

- Origin: Budapest
- Genres: techno
- Occupations: Record producer, DJ
- Label: MFS

Gabor Müller, known professionally as Corvin Dalek, is a Hungarian techno music disc jockey and record producer.

== Career ==
Dalek is from Budapest, Hungary. He was the instigator and performer behind the "wet and hard" club nights in Berlin, linked to the S&M scene, which featured, according to The Guardian, "really, really hard techno with really, really, really hard techno". Dalek become better known in 1999, when record label MFS released the compilation album Assorted E for Europe. Mixed by Dalek, and also featuring his track "E for Europe", the album was critically well received and hailed as a "breakthrough" for the genre. That same year MFS also released the compilation album Stadtansichten. Named after the German word for city views, the continuous album of 19 tracks was similarly mixed by Dalek and featured his track "Pounds and Penz". It was called an "uplifting and energizing collection of adventurous, exciting sounds" by Ed Ward, writing for the New York Times.

In 2000, with Mark Reeder, he formed the sub-label of MFS, Flesh, focused on underground music. Dalek was originally slated to record the 2001 New Order song "Crystal", until Bernard Sumner changed his mind and decided the group should record the single themselves. In 2001 he released the single "Pornoground", which achieved some chart success in the UK, and was positively reviewed by Muzik magazine. He released a compilation album for his club night, Wet&Hard, in 2002. Largely featuring his own tracks, critical reception was lukewarm, highlighting the lack of originality. In July 2002, Dalek performed a DJ mix on BBC Radio 1 for the Peel sessions.

== Discography ==
Singles
Title	Year	Peak UK Singles	Peak UK Ind.
"Pounds & Penz"	2000		39
"Gimme Two Fingers"	2001		
"Pornoground"	2001	94	
"The Atheist"	2001		
"A Real Man"	2002		

Albums
Title	Year	Artist
Assorted E for Europe	1999	Various (mixed by Dalek)
Stadtansichten	1999	Various (mixed by Dalek)
Wet&Hard	2002	Various (mixed by Dalek)
I am a Dalek	2003	Corvin Dalek
