= Queen of Hearts (musician) =

English electronic music artist

- Born: Elizabeth Morphew
- Origin: Swindon, England
- Genres: Pop, dance, electropop
- Occupations: Singer, songwriter
- Years active: 2011–present

Elizabeth Morphew, known professionally as Queen of Hearts, is an English electronic music artist.

== History ==
Queen of Hearts released her debut EP The Arrival in October 2011. Featuring collaborations with The Sound of Arrows, Dreamtrak, Diamond Cut and Devils Gun, the EP picked up widespread support from The Guardian, The Times, Popjustice, Q and The Line of Best Fit. The lead track, "Shoot The Bullet", featured an early remix from AlunaGeorge. The EP eventually went top ten on iTunes electronic chart in the UK, and she was selected to perform at Music Week's prestigious 'Breakout' showcase. She performed at Coachella singing "I Won't Let Go", alongside Monarchy.

Queen of Hearts then collaborated with the Swedish record producer Johan Agebjörn on "The Last Day of Summer" – the second single from his Casablanca Nights album. The collaboration was hailed as one of the album's high points by Pitchfork.

The Arrival was followed in May 2012 by the release of the double-A side "Neon" / "Tears in the Rain". Released in conjunction with US blog All Things Go, the release resulted in further favourable press, including features by Digital Spy, Popjustice, The Independent, Music Week, Record of The Day, NME, MuuMuse and Notion. The release hit the top five on iTunes electronic charts in the UK and number one on The Hype Machine leading to summer festival appearances at Barclaycard Wireless Festival and BT London Live. "Neon" has since been used in campaigns for Henry Holland and Topshop, as well as featuring in the hit US series Grey's Anatomy, NBC's Do No Harm, Jane the Virgin, Bojack Horseman, Famous in Love and La to Vegas. It has also featured in the movie soundtracks of Hello My Name is Dorris, There's Always Woodstock and How I Live Now.

A collaboration with Radio One DJ Kissy Sell Out, "You're Not The One", was premiered on his Radio One show, eventually being released via his San City High label.

The next single, "Warrior", was premiered by US blog Arjanwrites to coincide with a mini US tour, with dates in Washington and a spot playing Neon Gold's and All Things Go's CMJ showcase in New York. She was included in 10 Magazine's '10 Faces to watch' for 2013 alongside Disclosure and Spector and the release was again championed by Digital Spy, Popjustice and MTV Buzzworthy. A remix by Chad Valley premiered on The Line of Best Fit, becoming popular on blogs. The track was performed acoustically as part of a set for BBC Introducing. The track was another top five on the iTunes electronic chart in the UK.

In November 2013, Queen of Hearts released her single "Secret" with B-side "United", produced by Mark Reeder, premiering the track at Yahoo’s On the Road Festival.

Queen of Hearts made an unannounced return to the scene with the release of her debut album Cocoon on 30 June 2014, led by the EDM-meets-electro sound of the new single, "Like A Drug" – produced by Fabien Waltmann. Its accompanying video was the work of director, Robert Francis Muller.

In 2015, Queen of Hearts collaborated with Le Youth and featured on his single "R E A L".
