= Yargo (band) =

1980s Mancunian rock band

- Origin: Manchester, England
- Genres: Soul
- Years active: Mid-1980s–1991
- Labels: Bodybeat, London
- Spinoff of: Biting Tongues
- Past members: Basil Clarke; Phil Kirby; Paddy Steer; Tony Burnside

Yargo were a rock band from Manchester, England, active in the mid-to-late 1980s, featuring former members of post-punk band Biting Tongues.

== History ==
The band was formed in the mid-1980s by Basil Clarke (vocals), Phil Kirby (drums) and Paddy Steer (bass guitar) (all of whom had previously played with Biting Tongues), with guitarist Tony Burnside. They mixed jazz, blues, soul, reggae and rock, with Clarke receiving comparisons with Marvin Gaye, and made their debut in 1986 with the Get High EP on the Skysaw label, featuring Andy Diagram on trumpet. Their profile was raised by a performance on The Tube. Their debut album, Bodybeat, was released in 1987 on their own label of the same name. In 1988 they were signed by London Records, who reissued their debut album and followed it with Communicate in 1989. Also in 1989, they recorded the theme to Tony Wilson's Granada Television show The Other Side of Midnight, which was also released as a single. They reverted to the Bodybeat label for a live album, Yargo Live, in 1991, recorded at the Manchester International 2 the previous year. It proved to be their final release.

Clarke recorded as a solo artist, releasing the "Out of my Face" single in 1991, and made a guest appearance on the Future Sound of London album Accelerator in the same year. He also contributed vocals to Strange Parcels' Disconnection album in the mid-1990s.

== Discography ==
=== Albums ===
- Bodybeat (1987), Bodybeat - UK Indie #15, reissued (1988), London
- Communicate (1989), London
- Live (1991), Bodybeat

=== Singles, EPs ===
- Get High EP (1986), Skysaw
- "Carrying Mine" (1987), Racket Manufacture
- "Help" (1987), Bodybeat
- "Help" (1988), London
- "The Other Side of Midnight" (1989), London
- "The Love Revolution" (1990), Bodybeat
