= Good Together (A Certain Ratio album) =

Studio album by A Certain Ratio
- Released: 25 September 1989
- Genre: Dance rock
- Length: 57:35
- Labels: A&M
- Producer: Julian Mendelsohn

A Certain Ratio chronology
Force (1986)	Good Together (1989)	acr:mcr (1990)

Good Together is a sixth studio album by English post-punk band A Certain Ratio (ACR). Though the band had signed to A&M Records in 1987, it was not until mid-1989 that the new album arrived. When it did, the hoped-for more accessible sound of the singles "The Big E" and "Backs to the Wall" failed to secure hits. A third single "Your Blue Eyes" appeared on an EP in 1990. Their next album, acr:mcr, followed on A&M the next year. Due to the lack of success of both albums, the band left A&M shortly after.

== Track listing ==
Good Together track listing
No.	Title	Length
1.	"Your Blue Eyes"	4:37
2.	"Your Little World"	4:17
3.	"The Big E"	4:47
4.	"God's Own Girl"	5:01
5.	"Love Is the Way"	4:17
6.	"Backs to the Wall"	5:11
7.	"River's Edge"	4:55
8.	"Every Pleasure"	5:45
9.	"Coldest Days"	4:16
10.	"Good Together"	4:34
11.	"Repercussions"	4:48
12.	"2000 A√:"	4:58
Total length:		57:35
