= The Adventure Babies =

- Origin: Manchester
- Genres: Britpop
- Years active: 1990–2018
- Labels: Factory Records
- Members: Matt Tedstone; Dave Atherton; Jez Bramwell

The Adventure Babies were a Stafford-based Britpop band, founded by Matt Tedstone, Dave Atherton and Jez Bramwell in 1990. The band had three releases on the Factory Records label:

- The Camper Van (EP) (FAC 319, 1991)
- Laugh (album) (FACT 335, 1992)
- "Barking Mad" (single) (FACT 347, 1992)

The Adventure Babies were the last band signed by Factory Records before it went bankrupt. At the time of Factory's bankruptcy in 1992, test pressings had been made of a second single from the Laugh album, the title track.

The band continued playing with new guitarist Vulch (Bryan Wilkin) for a year, seeking a new recording contract.

A second album, Once Upon A Time The End, was issued in 2005, on CD only. In 2018 this was followed by a digital-only album release, Extracts of the Next.
