= Fred Dellar =

British music journalist (1931–2021)

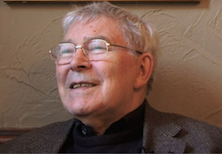
- Born: Frederick Dellar; 29 May 1931; Willesden, London, England
- Died: 15 May 2021 (aged 89)
- Occupations: Music writer; journalist

Frederick Dellar (29 May 1931 – 15 May 2021) was an English music writer and journalist, regarded in the popular music scene as "the king of trivia".

== Life and career ==
Fred Dellar was born in Willesden, London, and lived above a fish and chip shop which was bombed in the Second World War. He undertook National Service in 1950, and was posted to the RAF base at High Wycombe, where he started a jazz club. After returning to London, he worked in factories and warehouses while also producing jazz fanzines. From 1955, he began contributing reviews to magazines including Record Mirror, and liner notes for records. He became the secretary of the Frank Sinatra Appreciation Society in the UK, edited a fanzine, Perfectly Frank, attended a wide range of jazz and other gigs, and accumulated a collection of magazines and files of information that proved invaluable in later years. He married in 1958, and in 1964 started working for the London Book Centre distribution company, while writing reviews in his spare time.

In 1971, after being made redundant from a warehouse job in London, he and his wife moved to Northampton. He successfully applied for a job at the New Musical Express, where he served as deputy news editor, compiled music charts, wrote reviews and undertook interviews. He also developed his "Fred Fact" column, answering innumerable questions from readers before the coming of the internet. In 1981 he wrote The NME Guide to Rock Cinema, followed by The Illustrated History of Country Music. A 1989 report by him on Factory Records was given its own catalogue number - FAC227 - by label boss Tony Wilson. After leaving the NME in 1996 he contributed to a wide range of music magazines, including Smash Hits, Vox and The Wire. He also wrote books about Sinatra, jazz, country, and rock music. He contributed crosswords to a number of magazines, including Empire and Mojo. Dellar contributed for 25 years to the latter magazine, where he was known for features like the "Time Machine" and "Ask Fred" pages.

Dellar died on 15 May 2021, aged 89. He was predeceased by his wife Pam a year earlier, and survived by his son Glenn.

== Publications ==
- The Illustrated Encyclopaedia of Country Music (1977)
- NME Guide to Rock Cinema (1981)
- Where Did You Go To, My Lovely?: The Lost Sounds and Stars of the Sixties (1983)
- Rock and Pop Crosswords (1983)
- The Essential Guide to Rock Records (with Barry Lazell, 1983)
- The Country Music Book of Lists (1984)
- The Hip: Hipsters, Jazz and the Beat Generation (with Roy Carr and Brian Case, 1987)
- Sinatra: His Life and Times (1995)
- Excess All Areas. A Who's Who of Rock Depravity (with Gary Boiler, 1995)
- Frank Sinatra: Night and Day - The Man and the Music (1997)
- The Mojo Inquisition: Rock 'n' Roll Quiz and Crossword Book (2001)
