= The Wendys =

Background information
- Origin: Edinburgh, Scotland
- Genres: Indie pop, baggy
- Years active: 1990–1999, 2012, 2017–present
- Labels: Factory Records, East West Records, Starshaped Records

The Wendys are a Scottish alternative indie rock band, that were part of the Madchester music scene, and were signed to the Factory Records music label by Tony Wilson. They were formed in Edinburgh by Jonathan Renton (vocals), Ian White (guitar), Johnny MacArthur (drums), and Arthur Renton (bass).

== History ==
Formed in 1987, the Wendys were the second Scottish band to be signed to Factory Records, after the Wake. Their name came about after a nights drinking in the Blues Basement (now the Basenment) the evening before they were due to play their first show in an apartment in Claremont Crescent Edinburgh. After the group opened for the Happy Mondays, Shaun Ryder's father suggested that they send in a demo tape. After they were signed to the label, Phil Saxe acted as their manager. Having felt at odds with the contemporary Scottish music scene, the Wendys found a common spirit among the Factory Records roster, saying they shared similar influences as their labelmates but still wanted to be known as their own distinct band. Although they enjoyed critical acclaim with the release of their debut album Gobbledygook in 1991 (produced by Ian Broudie), they did not achieve the widespread popularity of labelmates such as New Order or the Happy Mondays. The timing of their album's release directly preceded the demise of the label, also hurting their chances at success. Following a long hiatus, the group released their second album Sixfootwingspan (originally intended to be called Sixfootwingspan Yoga Birds) in 1999.

On 4 February 2012, the band reformed for a one-off gig at the Berkeley Suite, Glasgow to promote the re-release of their Factory album Gobbledygook and other singles.

In 2017, they signed up to play the Shiiine ON Weekender festival in Minehead, UK on Friday 10 November 2017 – Monday 13 November 2017. Rehearsals started in April 2017. This was their first show outside Scotland in 23 years.

On 11 May 2017, via their Twitter feed, they announced that they would be playing a rare live show in Glasgow on 30 September 2017 at Audio on Midland Street, Glasgow. The Wendys supported Black Grape at Edinburgh Liquid Room on 25 September 2021 and headlined the Lowlands Music Awards 2023 at the Biscuit Factory on 2 September 2023.

== Discography ==
=== Albums ===
Year	Albums
1991	Gobbledygook (FAC 285)
1991	I Instruct (EP) (FAC 337)
1999	Sixfootwingspan

=== Singles ===
Year	Singles
1990	"More Than Enough" (FAC 280)
1991	"The Sun's Going to Shine for Me Soon" (FAC 289)
1991	"Pulling My Fingers Off" (FAC 297)
