= Feverhouse =

1984 British film

- Directed by: Howard Walmsley
- Screenplay by: Ken Hollings
- Produced by: Howard Walmsley
- Starring: Joanne Hill; Graham Massey; Patrick Nyland
- Cinematography: David Horsfield
- Edited by: David Horsfield
- Production company: Pressure Productions
- Release date: 1984
- Running time: 55 minutes
- Country: United Kingdom
- Language: English

Feverhouse (also known as Fever House) is a 1984 British black and white film directed by Howard Walmsley. It was written by Ken Hollings and released through Ikon FCL, a division of Factory Records, catalogued as FAC105. It was partially financed by the North West Arts Association.

== Plot summary ==
The story is set in a mental hospital and told through the preoccupations of a smug thief, a renegade nurse and a blind archivist.

== Cast ==
- Joanne Hill as the nurse
- Graham Massey as the thief
- Patrick Nyland as the blind man

== Soundtrack ==
The soundtrack album by Biting Tongues was released in 1985 on Factory Records (FACT105).

== Reception ==
Paul Taylor wrote in The Monthly Film Bulletin wrote: "A joyless chunk of mannered monochrome moodiness, Feverhouse is presumably meant to be more than just a promotional adjunct to its soundtrack album, but founders badly as a compendium of awkwardly 'avant-garde' tics. The zomboid acting style conveys more about institutionalisation than the meagre, almost ritualistic narrative, while the sinister ambience conjured by nocturnal images of burning clothes, bagged corpses, skeletal relics or cold Victorian brickwork is all too often dissipated by the risible gravity of the various voice-overs. Where these coincide with the Biting Tongues backing, the effect is inescapably reminiscent of a vintage, if humourless, poetry-and-music track by such old hippies as Liverpool Scene."

Colin Greenland reviewed Feverhouse for Imagine magazine, writing: "Is the Feverhouse a prison, a lunatic asylum, or a state of mind? Enigmatic, abstract and intense."

Time Out commented that "it hovers dangerously close to pretension, sometimes teetering over the edge, but still remains a darkly individual visual essay, despite its precedents. It's also blessed with an exciting score, a brew of metal gamelan and junkyard bebop from Biting Tongues."
