= Sextet (A Certain Ratio album) =

Studio album by A Certain Ratio
- Released: January 1982
- Studio: Revolution Studios (Cheadle Hulme, Stockport)
- Genre: New wave; funk; dance; world music
- Length: 37:13
- Label: Factory
- Producer: A Certain Ratio

A Certain Ratio chronology
To Each... (1981)	Sextet (1982)	I'd Like to See You Again (1982)

Singles from Sextet
- 1. "Knife Slits Water" Released: 1982

Sextet is the third studio album by the English post-punk band A Certain Ratio, released in January 1982 by Factory Records. It is the first album by the band not to be produced by Martin Hannett, due to the band wishing for a new sound.

The album spent eleven weeks in the UK Independent Albums Chart, peaking at number 1.

== Critical reception ==
Professional ratings
Review scores
Source	Rating
AllMusic	3/5 stars
The Encyclopedia of Popular Music	3/5 stars
Pitchfork	8.1/10
Stylus Magazine	A−
Uncut	4/5

The album generally received critical acclaim. Writing in Smash Hits on the album's release in January 1982, Dave Rimmer noted that the album featured "dense and gloomy pieces", suitable for "the bleak mid-winter". He gave the album an overall 6 out of 10. Sounds's David McCullough gave Sextet five stars and praised its timelessness: "Sextet is an album of the present, killing the present and agreeably ignoring the future." The Quietus called it "a visionary musical statement" and "arguably their greatest moment [...] Not since PIL's dominant Metal Box had a band so seamlessly traversed such an unexpectedly broad musical landscape." Stylus Magazine called the album "a masterpiece [...] a mesmerizing blend of ethnic rhythms and ghostly production that really sounds like nothing else." Douglas Wolk of Pitchfork thought that the album "still sounds like no other record: either that era's creepiest, boggiest dance album or its funkiest smear of brittle art-noise." Uncut praised the record for its "taut, abrasive swagger," as well as its blend of funk and world music influences. Exclaim! critic Kevin Hainey described it as "a strong ACR album from start to finish", and wrote that Tilson's vocals "give the band a somewhat airier, more soulful feel, and the added attention to African rhythms only slightly relieves their trademark tension."

Nevertheless, Trouser Press gave an unfavourable review to the album, writing: "There's no real focus to the discoid beats and wailing female vocals (Martha Tilson); ACR don't seem especially motivated by the music they're making." AllMusic critic Keith Farley thought that the record "upped the energy of A Certain Ratio's dour minimalist dance." Farley also stated "the electronics and rhythms are still curiously apart from song structure for the most part, making for an oddly distanced record."

== Track listing ==
All tracks are written by A Certain Ratio.

1. "Lucinda" – 3:56
2. "Crystal" – 2:55
3. "Gum" – 2:59
4. "Knife Slits Water" – 7:34
5. "Skipscada" – 2:10
6. "Day One" – 6:12
7. "Rub Down" – 3:43
8. "Rialto" – 3:45
9. "Below the Canal" – 3:59

== Personnel ==
Album personnel as adapted from album liner notes.

Musicians

- Donald Johnson
- Jeremy Kerr
- Martha Tilson
- Martin Moscrop
- Peter Terrell
- Simon Topping

Other personnel

- A Certain Ratio – production
- Phil Ault – engineering
- EG – mastering
- Steve McGarry – artwork
- Denis Ryan – artwork painting

== Charts ==
Album

Charts (1982)	Peak position
UK Albums Chart	53
