= To Each... =

Studio album by A Certain Ratio
- Released: 1981
- Studio: E.A.R.S., East Orange, New Jersey
- Genre: Post-punk; art funk; funk punk
- Length: 46:10
- Label: Factory
- Producer: Martin Hannett

A Certain Ratio chronology
The Graveyard and the Ballroom (1980)	To Each... (1981)	Sextet (1982)

Professional ratings
Review scores
Source	Rating
AllMusic	2.5/5 stars
The Encyclopedia of Popular Music	4/5 stars

To Each... is the second album and debut LP by English band A Certain Ratio, released in 1981 by record label Factory. It is sometimes considered the band's official first album. It was recorded in New Jersey and produced by Factory mainstay Martin Hannett.

The album spent twenty weeks in the UK Independent Chart, peaking at number 1.

Despite being panned by some critics and being unfavourably compared to Joy Division, To Each... has received widespread acclaim from record companies that reissued the album, with many praising it for its unconventional sound and rhythm sections. Turntable Lab hailed it as a landmark release of the post-punk era.

== Reception ==
To Each... received generally positive reviews. Stranded Records said of the album's direction, "...To Each… pushes to A Certain Ratio's powerhouse rhythm section to the foreground. Within the supple dynamics to the album's songs, Donald Johnson's flawless percussive syncopations brace the limber basslines from Jez Kerr. Tracks like "Felch," "Forced Laugh" and "The Fox" recoil and lunge with intensity and grace, as A Certain Ratio fills in the blanks with swarms of guitar noise, bursts of militant trumpet and sporadic vocals." Attack Magazine referred to the album as a "set of pioneering monochrome funk." Soul Jazz Records deemed it as "seminal," calling it "one of ACR's finest moments." Turntable Lab considered To Each... to be a landmark post-punk album, noting that it found the band "fusing heavy funk, dub, and punk to create a completely new and influential sound." Piccadilly Records wrote: "The sound is good for lo-fi recordings, and the band is, for all of their musical amateurishness, precise and controlled. Those seeking an idiosyncratic, interesting art-funk band can do no wrong with this release." Patrick Ryder of The Vinyl Factory stated, "...the LP swaggers along the precipice of post punk and odd funk to the syncopated hats and flying triplets of Donald Johnson’s faultless drumming. The rubbery twang of Jez Kerr’s bass rounds out the primal, powerhouse rhythm section, while Martin Moscrop’s plangent trumpet and a succession of warped vocals create an ever present sense of unease. Bookended by the clipped groove of ‘Felch’ and the percussion led voodoo of the standout ‘Winter Hill’, To Each… saw ACR further develop an increasingly unique sound."

AllMusic, Trouser Press and The Quietus were less favourable. Keith Farley of AllMusic wrote that with the album, "the group dropped much of the bleak dance-punk of early material in place of what sounds like a shallow attempt to seize the baton dropped by gloom giants Joy Division after the death of Ian Curtis", calling the record "a bit too mired in its own misery to make an impression on listeners." Trouser Press wrote: "The studied tedium of To Each... [...] snuffed the [band's] early promise, as the band buried itself in dreary rhythms and astonishing self-indulgence." The Quietus echoed similar sentiments.

== Track listing ==
1. "Felch" – 3:45
2. "My Spirit" – 2:28
3. "Forced Laugh" – 5:53
4. "Choir" – 2:51
5. "Back to the Start" – 7:49
6. "The Fox" – 3:46
7. "Loss" – 3:23
8. "Oceans" – 3:30
9. "Winter Hill" – 12:45

Personnel Simon Topping Donald Johnson Jeremy Kerr Peter Terrell Martin Moscrop Martha Tilson (vocals on 'Back to the Start', 'Loss' and 'Oceans')
