= Change the Station =

Studio album by ACR
- Released: January 1997
- Genre: Dance-pop; ambient
- Length: 74:04
- Label: Rob's
- Producer: A Certain Ratio

ACR chronology
Up in Downsville (1992)	Change the Station (1997)	Mind Made Up (2008)

Change the Station is the seventh studio album by English band A Certain Ratio, released under the acronym ACR in January 1997. Released on Rob's Records label, it was the band's first album after a five-year hiatus, since 1992's Up in Downsville.

The album finds the band working from a dance-pop and ambient music foundation, with elements from Madchester funk and ambient house. The record also features vocals from singers Denise Johnson and Lorna Bailey.

== Critical reception ==
Professional ratings
Review scores
Source	Rating
AllMusic	3/5 stars
The Encyclopedia of Popular Music	3/5 stars
Muzik	2.5/5 stars

AllMusic senior critic Stephen Thomas Erlewine thought that the record "finds A Certain Ratio in top form." Erlewine also praised Johnson and Bailey's vocals, writing that their "soulful singing gives the songs dimension, helping make Change the Station a genuine return to form."

== Track listing ==
1. "Listen to the Sound" – 4:59
2. "Some Day" – 6:15
3. "Your on Your Own" – 4:54
4. "Waiting for You" – 6:00
5. "Yeah Boy" – 6:59
6. "Sister Brother" – 5:11
7. "Desire" – 6:05
8. "Samba 123" – 5:27
9. "Pole" – 5:47
10. "Do Du Beep" – 6:07
11. "Golden Balls" – 5:48
12. "Funk Off" – 5:34
13. "Groov(E)" – 5:01

== Personnel ==
Album personnel as adapted from album liner notes.

- A Certain Ratio – performance, production, mixing; recording (2–5, 7–12)
- Denise Johnson – additional vocals (1, 6–7, 9, 11–12)
- Lorna Bailey – additional vocals (2–3)
- Liam Mullan – additional keyboards (3)
- Andy Connell – piano, Rhodes piano (6)
- Corinne Drewery – additional vocals (6)
- MCR Horns – brass instruments (11–12)
- Tim Oliver – audio engineering (1, 6, 13)
- Julia Fenton – CGI artist
- Andy Robinson – editing
- Graham Newman – typography
