= Force (A Certain Ratio album) =

Studio album by A Certain Ratio
- Released: November 1986
- Recorded: July–August 1986
- Studio: Yello 2 Studios (Stockport)
- Genre: Funk; dance-rock
- Length: 37:10
- Label: Factory
- Producer: Stuart James; A Certain Ratio

A Certain Ratio chronology
I'd Like to See You Again (1982)	Force (1986)	Good Together (1989)

Singles from Force
- 1. "Mickey Way" Released: 1986; 2. "Bootsy" Released: 1986

Force is the fifth studio album by the English post-punk band A Certain Ratio, released in November 1986 by Factory Records; their final release on the label. Stuart James co-produced the album with the band. It was recorded and mixed between July and August 1986 at Yello 2 Studios in Stockport.

It is the first studio album by the band to feature saxophonist Tony Quigley and the final to feature keyboardist Andy Connell as a full-time member who left the band to concentrate on his work with the pop band Swing Out Sister who had started to gain mainstream success around the time that this album was released. Corinne Drewery of Swing Out Sister provided additional vocals on the track "Bootsy".

The album received good reviews from music critics, and spent nine weeks on the UK Independent Albums Chart, peaking at No. 2. "Mickey Way" was the first single from the album, released exclusively in the UK. "Bootsy" was the second single from the album and was released exclusively in Australia. Neither single charted.

In 1994, Creation Records re-issued the album on CD without any bonus content. The album was later re-issued again in 2009 by LTM Recordings but this time featuring two bonus tracks: "The Runner" and the Australian single remix of "Bootsy". "Nostromo a Gogo" was added to the original Factory Records cassette version of the album which was contained within a blue hessian-covered box, the same design as for the cassette version of the contemporary release of Brotherhood by New Order which was also on Factory Records.

== Critical reception ==
Professional ratings
Review scores
Source	Rating
AllMusic	3.5/5 stars
The Quietus	(positive)
Trouser Press	(negative)
The Encyclopedia of Popular Music	3/5 stars
Record Collector	5/5 stars

Force received a mostly positive response from critics. The Quietus wrote: "To the band's surprise, Force immediately struck a nerve, not just within the confines of Manchester either, pushing the band close to the success they always deserved. [...] Force remains their purest moment". Trouser Press, on the other hand, wrote that the album "[abandons] the raw, stark and chilling sound of the band's seminal work. Professionally executed but completely boring and devoid of spontaneity, there's little here that Chuck Mangione fans might not enjoy."

In a retrospective review for AllMusic, critic Ned Raggett described the album as "a record of its time as a result -- the sometimes airless, compressed production often fights against more inspired individual elements song for song, like Quigley's layered brass break on "Bootsy," one of the album's highlights and clearly a bit of a nod to the legendary P-Funk bassist Bootsy Collins." Raggett also further added that "Donald Johnson's drumming and Martin Moscrop's multi-instrumental work remain hyperactive and sometimes subtly surprising, and at the album's best."

== Track listing ==
All tracks are written by A Certain Ratio.

Side one
No.	Title	Length
1.	"Only Together"	3:40
2.	"Bootsy"	4:38
3.	"Fever 103°"	5:13
4.	"Naked and White"	4:57

Side two
No.	Title	Length
5.	"Mickey Way"	4:50
6.	"And Then She Smiles"	3:59
7.	"Take Me Down"	5:00
8.	"Anthem"	4:53
Total length:		37:10

Additional CD tracks
No.	Title	Length
9.	"Nostromo a gogo"	4:53
10.	"Inside"	4:27
11.	"Si firmi o grido"	7:10

== Personnel ==
Credits are adapted from the Force liner notes.

A Certain Ratio

- Jeremy Kerr – lead vocals; bass guitar; tapes
- Andy Connell – piano; vocoder; synthesizer; keyboard samples
- Martin Moscrop – guitar; guitar synthesizer; trumpet
- Donald Johnson – drums; backing vocals; lead vocals on "Inside"
- Anthony Quigley – soprano and tenor saxophones

Additional musicians

- Tom Barnish – trombone on "Bootsy" and "Mickey Way"
- Corinne Drewery – additional vocals on "Bootsy"
- Paul Harrison – Yamaha DX7 bass programming
