= Biting Tongues =

English post-punk band

- Origin: Manchester, England
- Genres: Post-punk, experimental rock, avant-prog
- Years active: 1979–1989
- Labels: Situation 2 New Hormones; Factory; LTM
- Past members: Howard Walmsley; Graham Massey; Ken Hollings; Colin Seddon; Eddie Sherwood; Basil Clarke; Phil Kirby; Tom Barnish; Mark Derbey; Patrick Steer
- Website: bitingtongues.com

Biting Tongues were a post-punk band formed in Manchester, England in 1979, whose members went on to join Simply Red, Yargo, and 808 State.

== History ==
The band was formed in 1979 by saxophonist Howard Walmsley, initially to record a soundtrack for his film of the same name, recruiting Ken Hollings (vocals) and Eddie Sherwood (drums), and shortly afterwards Graham Massey (guitar) and Colin Seddon (bass guitar) of local band the Post Natals. Their debut release was the Don't Heal album, released in 1981 on the Beggars Banquet Records subsidiary Situation 2. They then released the Live It cassette on Richard Boon's New Hormones label, before their 1984 album Libreville, which was recorded for New Hormones but released on the Paragon label due to the former label's financial problems. They then moved to Factory Records, with Hollings and Sherwood leaving (the latter joining Simply Red), and Basil Clarke (vocals), Tom Barnish (trombone), and Phil Kirby (drums) replacing them. The new line-up recorded the soundtrack to their Feverhouse film, which was released on video by Factory's video offshoot Ikon Video, and the Trouble Hand EP, before Clarke and Kirby left to form Yargo. Seddon left to form the Inner Sense Percussion Ensemble. As a trio of Walmsley, Massey and Barnish, they released a final EP for Factory, before moving on again. After three further twelve-inch singles, and the video album Wall of Surf, the band split up in 1989 after Massey had formed 808 State, which became the focus of his efforts. Walmsley continued making films and videos, including videos for 808 State. Massey later performed as Massonix. A final album, Recharge - Part 1, remained unreleased at the time apart from promotional copies, due to the collapse of the Cut Deep label, eventually being released in 2003 by LTM..

The band reunited in 2003 to perform at the Institute of Contemporary Arts in London with a line-up of Massey, Hollings, Walmsley, Seddon and Sherwood, and reformed again in 2009 to play at the 'A Factory Night' event in Brussels .

== Discography ==
=== Albums ===
- Don't Heal (1981), Situation 2
- Live It (1981), New Hormones
- Libreville (1984), Paragon
- Feverhouse (1985), Factory
- Recharge - Part 1 (1989), Cut Deep - promo only

Compilations and CD reissues

- Compressed: The Factory Recordings (2003), LTM
- Recharge (2003), LTM
- After the Click: Retrospective 1980-1989 (2003), LTM

=== Singles, EPs ===
- Trouble Hand EP (1985), Factory
- "Compressor" (1987), Factory
- "Evening State" (1988), Antler
- "Evening State" (1988), Antler - split release with Tank of Danzig
- "Love Out" (1989), Cut Deep

=== Video ===
- Wall of Surf (1988), Ikon Video
