= I'd Like to See You Again =

Studio album by A Certain Ratio
- Released: 1982
- Studio: Revolution Studios (Cheadle Hulme, Stockport)
- Genre: Post-punk; funk; dance-rock
- Length: 36:28
- Label: Factory
- Producer: A Certain Ratio

A Certain Ratio chronology
Sextet (1982)	I'd Like to See You Again (1982)	Force (1986)

Singles from I'd Like to See You Again
- 1. "Guess Who" Released: 1982 (Belgium-only release)

I'd Like to See You Again is the fourth studio album by the English post-punk band A Certain Ratio, released in 1982 by Factory Records.

The album spent twelve weeks in the UK Independent Albums Chart, peaking at number 2.

== Critical reception ==
Professional ratings
Review scores
Source	Rating
AllMusic	4/5 stars
The Encyclopedia of Popular Music	3/5 stars
Pitchfork	6.1/10
Record Collector	3/5 stars

I'd Like to See You Again received a mixed-to-favourable response from critics. Trouser Press wrote that the album "suffers from [singer Martha] Tilson's absence, and stumbles about, evincing self-consciousness and conservatism in place of the previously aggressive experimental attitude." Record Collector called it "one of their finest albums [...] I'd Like to See You Again is timeless, and ready for a first date with a new generation."

== Track listing ==
Side one

1. "Touch" – 5:05
2. "Saturn" – 3:46
3. "Hot Knights" – 3:51
4. "I'd Like to See You Again" – 5:11

Side two

5. "Show Case" – 3:10
6. "Sesamo Apriti - Corco Vada" – 3:51
7. "Axis" – 6:25
8. "Guess Who" – 4:58

== Personnel ==
A Certain Ratio

- Simon Topping
- Donald Johnson
- Jeremy Kerr
- Peter Terrell
- Martin Moscrop
