= Mind Made Up =

Studio album by A Certain Ratio
- Released: November 2008
- Genre: Post-punk; funk
- Length: 49:58
- Label: LTM
- Producer: A Certain Ratio

A Certain Ratio chronology
Change the Station (1997)	Mind Made Up (2008)	ACR LOCO (2020)

Mind Made Up is the ninth studio album by English post-punk band A Certain Ratio. Released in 2008 through French Le Maquis record label, it is the band's first album since 1997's Change the Station, following a series of re-issues of past material. The band sought to capture a live sound during the recording of the album. The album was reissued by on 2 June 2010 through LTM Recordings with two extra tracks.

== Critical reception ==
Professional ratings
Review scores
Source	Rating
AllMusic	3.5/5 stars

The album generally received positive reviews. AllMusic critic Ned Raggett thought that Mind Made Up "found the group in creative health while approaching 30 years of work and beyond". Raggett also wrote that the record "feels more like them keeping on rather than trying to stake out a space in a crowded musical landscape." Martin Longley of BBC stated: "These songs reinforce a formula, but it's ACR's very own formula, and one that still remains highly distinctive." Writing for Exclaim!, Michael Edwards described the release as "another solid and funky album from A Certain Ratio" and considered it as " both a natural progression of the band's sound and a return to their roots."

== Track listing ==
1. "I Feel Light" – 3:20
2. "Down, Down, Down" – 4:29
3. "Everything Is Good" – 4:25
4. "Way to Escape" – 3:53
5. "Rialto 2006" – 3:58
6. "Mind Made Up" – 5:20
7. "Teri" – 3:45
8. "Bird to the Ground" – 3:42
9. "Starlight" – 5:19
10. "Which Is Reality?" – 3:38
11. "Skunk" – 2:27
12. "Very Busy Man" – 5:42

== Personnel ==
Album personnel as adapted from album liner notes.

- A Certain Ratio – performance, production
- Colin Dunkerly – engineering
- Gavin Kapps – assistant engineering
- Ivan Gracia – assistant engineering
- Paul O'Brien – mastering
- Martin Moscrop – engineering
