= The Graveyard and the Ballroom =

- Original cassette packaging: orange version

Studio album / Live album by A Certain Ratio
- Released: January 1980
- Recorded: September & October 1979
- Venue: Electric Ballroom in October 1979
- Studio: Graveyard Studios in September 1979
- Genres: Post-punk; dance-punk
- Length: 45:38
- Label: Factory
- Producer: Martin Hannett

A Certain Ratio chronology
The Graveyard and the Ballroom (1980)	To Each... (1981)

Singles from The Graveyard and the Ballroom
- 1. "Flight" Released: 1980; 2. "Do the Du (Cassie) / Shack Up" Released: 1981 (US-only release)

Professional ratings
Review scores
Source	Rating
AllMusic	3.5/5 stars
The Encyclopedia of Popular Music	2/5 stars

The Graveyard and the Ballroom is the debut album by the English post-punk band A Certain Ratio, released in January 1980 by record label Factory. It was produced by Martin Hannett. It was originally released only as a cassette, designed by Peter Saville. The album has been re-released on CD by Creation Records in 1994 and by Mute Records in 2017. The latter also reissued the album on vinyl, replicating the original PVC pouch of the cassette release.

The reissued album spent five weeks in the UK Independent Chart, peaking at number 29.

== Content ==
Side A of the album, The Graveyard, was recorded at Graveyard Studios in September 1979, while the other side, The Ballroom, was recorded live at the Electric Ballroom in October.

== Critical reception ==
AllMusic described the album as "accomplished enough to be intriguing, but never all that gripping." Trouser Press called it "an exciting and original post-punk dance record". Stylus called it "not only a very interesting historical document but also a pretty entertaining album in its own right".

== Track listing ==
=== The Graveyard ===
1. "Do the Du (Casse)" - 2:53
2. "Faceless" - 2:22
3. "Crippled Child" - 2:54
4. "Choir" - 3:21
5. "Flight" - 3:30
6. "I Feel" - 2:12
7. "Strain" - 2:31

=== The Ballroom ===
8. "All Night Party" - 3:38
9. "Oceans" - 4:05
10. "The Choir" - 3:22
11. "The Fox" - 3:25
12. "Suspect" - 2:24
13. "Flight" - 5:32
14. "Genotype-Phenotype" - 3:29
