= A Certain Ratio =

English post-punk band

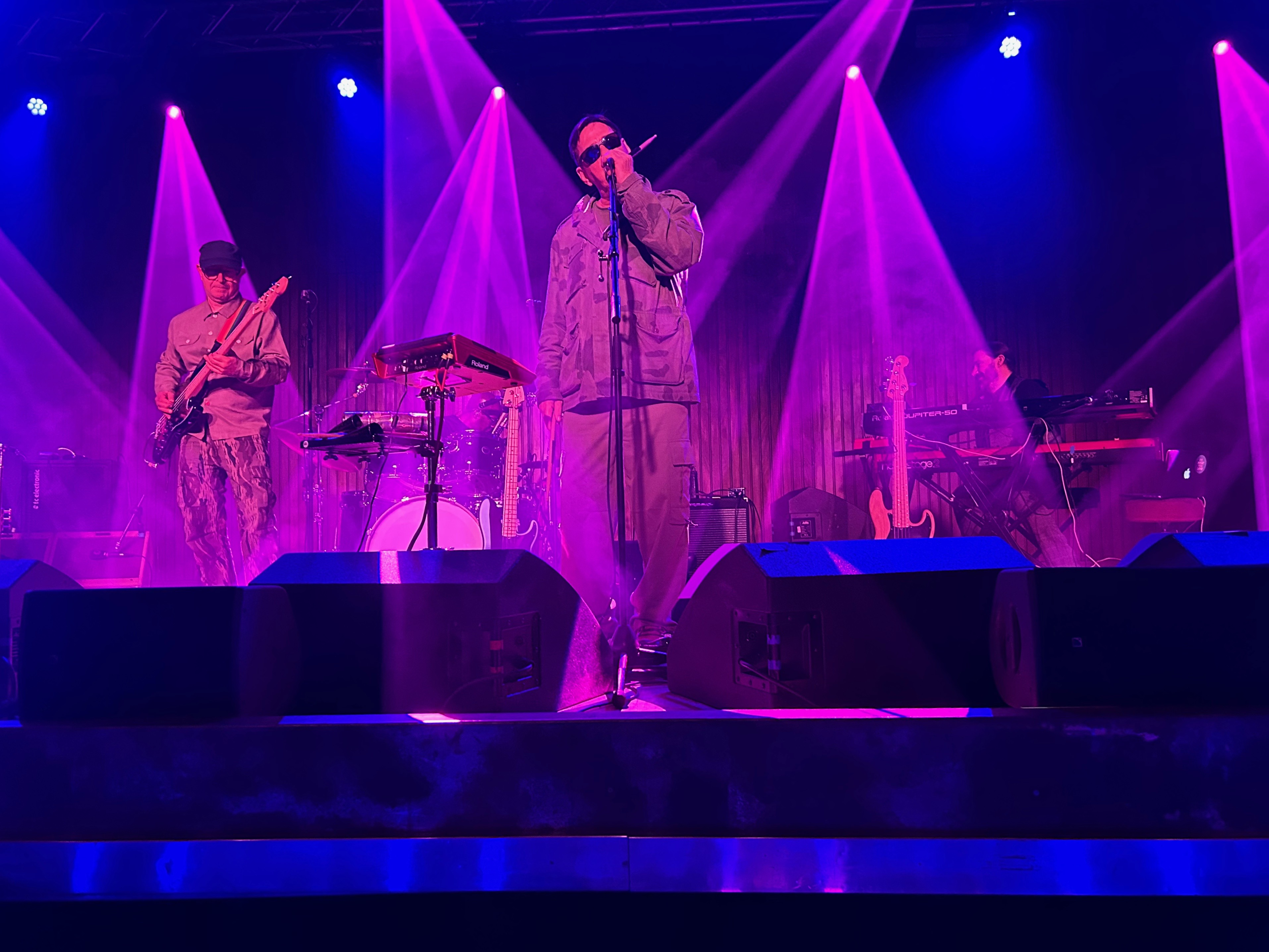
- A Certain Ratio performing at New Century Hall in Manchester, England, 2023

Background information
- Also known as: ACR; Sir Horatio
- Origin: Flixton, Greater Manchester, England
- Genres: Post-punk; funk; new wave; avant-funk; dance-punk; dance-rock
- Years active: 1977–present
- Labels: Factory; A&M; Rob's; Creation; Soul Jazz; Mute
- Spinoffs: Kalima; Swing Out Sister
- Members: Jez Kerr; Martin Moscrop; Donald Johnson; Tony Quigley; Matt Steele; Ellen Beth Abdi; Viv Griffin
- Past members: Peter Terrell; Simon Topping; Martha Tilson; Liam Mullan; Andy Connell; Denise Johnson
- Website: acrmcr.com

A Certain Ratio (abbreviated as ACR) are an English post-punk band formed in Flixton, Greater Manchester in 1977 by Peter Terrell (guitar), Simon Topping (vocals, trumpet), Jez Kerr (bass guitar, vocals), Martin Moscrop (trumpet, guitar) and Donald Johnson (drums), with Martha Tilson (vocals) joining soon after.

One of the first indie groups to draw heavy influence from funk as well as disco and Latin percussion, the band were among the first to debut on Tony Wilson's Factory Records in 1979 with "All Night Party", produced by Martin Hannett. During ACR's early years with Factory, they scored seven Top Ten UK independent releases, highlighted by "Flight" and "Waterline", and released five studio albums beginning with The Graveyard and the Ballroom (1980).

Following late 1980s and early 1990s phases with A&M Records and Rob Gretton's independent Robs Records, ACR was intermittently active. The group returned to the studio for its ninth studio album Mind Made Up (2008) and since then has continued to perform, with its back catalogue reissued through an arrangement with Mute Records.

They released their first studio album in twelve years, ACR Loco in September 2020, followed by three extended plays (EPs) A, C and R in 2021, and eleventh studio album, 1982, in 2023. Their twelfth and most recent studio album, It All Comes Down to This was released in 2024.

== History ==
=== The Factory era ===
==== Formation and first releases ====
The band was formed by vocalist Simon Topping and guitarist and electronics player Peter Terrell, who after initially performing as a duo, were soon joined by bassist and vocalist Jez Kerr and then guitarist and trumpeter Martin Moscrop, the band played without a drummer for a year. The band's name is taken from the lyric of Brian Eno's song "The True Wheel" from his solo studio album Taking Tiger Mountain (By Strategy) (1974). Their early influences included the Velvet Underground, Kraftwerk, Wire, Brian Eno, the Pop Group, and Pere Ubu. Over time, A Certain Ratio's music took on elements from such acts as James Brown, Parliament, Funkadelic, Hermeto Pascoal, Airto Moreira, and Flora Purim. A Certain Ratio, by early 1979, were "beginning to forge links between post-punk industrial and dance-floor funk" (Tony Wilson, Factory Records).

ACR's line-up, with a dark bass-heavy industrial and funk sound, recorded the group's debut single, "All Night Party", released by Factory Records in September 1979 (the label's first single artist release), with Factory label boss Tony Wilson also becoming their manager, proclaiming the band to be "the new Sex Pistols". The 5,000 copies that were pressed soon sold out.

On 1 October 1979, the band recorded a session for John Peel's BBC Radio 1 show, by which time Donald Johnson had joined the band on drums. The session included "Do the Du", "All Night Party", "Flight" and "Choir" and was broadcast on 17 October.

ACR played their first tour of bigger venues as the opening act on American rock band Talking Heads' UK tour in December 1979. There are suggestions that watching ACR perform encouraged lead vocalist David Byrne and Talking Heads to go in a more funky musical direction.

==== Early albums ====
Their next release, the cassette-only compilation of demos and live tracks The Graveyard and the Ballroom, was released in January 1980. The Graveyard side of the album was recorded at Graveyard Studios, Prestwich, Greater Manchester in September 1979, produced by Factory's Martin Hannett. The Ballroom side was a live recording of ACR’s October 1979 gig at the Electric Ballroom, Camden, London. A Certain Ratio consider the release to be "our most punk-funk album. It's got real indie undertones, post-punk undertones".

Martin Moscrop started a second band in 1980, Swamp Children (the name later changed to Kalima), that would go on to share several members with A Certain Ratio.

In July 1980, the band's second single, a cover version of Banbarra's "Shack Up", recorded at a cost of £50, was released. This was followed in November with "Flight" on 12", which saw their first placing on the UK Independent Chart, peaking at no. 7. "Shack Up" got a US release in January 1981, going on to peak at no. 46 on the Billboard Dance Club Songs chart, and the band expanded to a six-piece with the addition of former Occult Chemistry vocalist Martha Tilson, with Topping focusing on trumpet and percussion.

The expanded line-up recorded their debut studio album, To Each... The album was recorded in New Jersey with Martin Hannett producing, and released in May 1981. It topped the UK Independent Chart. To Each... represents a development in the ACR sound from the raw harshness of The Graveyard and the Ballroom to a percussion-based post-punk funk.

They recorded a second Peel session in June 1981. The session, which included "Knife Slits Water", "Day One" and "Skipscada", was broadcast on 2 July. ACR finished the year with the single "Waterline", which was another top 10 indie chart hit. "Waterline" was the first record self-produced by the group. All of ACR’s previous recordings had been produced by Factory's Martin Hannett but the band wanted a different sound. "We thought he was making us sound too much like Joy Division" (Martin Moscrop, ACR). "Waterline" has a more funk and jazz sound than earlier recordings.

The band's third studio album, Sextet, followed in January 1982, now incorporating elements of acid jazz, funk, and Latin music, and again topped the indie albums chart, also peaking at no. 55 on the UK Albums Chart. Tony Wilson had arranged for ACR to go to New York to record To Each... but that album had already been largely written and the influences of New York did not really appear in ACR's music until Sextet. The band's recent stay in New York had increased the Latin, jazz and Cuban percussion influences in their music. Sextet was the first album that was self-produced by ACR and is closer to the "dark funk" sound the band wanted. ACR rate Sextet as one of their stand out albums.

In February 1982, they released the dub reggae single "Abracadubra" under the pseudonym 'Sir Horatio'. ACR had further indie charting singles that year with "Guess Who?" and "Knife Slits Water". The group recorded a third Peel session in November, now without Tilson, but with Andy Connell added on keyboards and percussion. This session saw the group show more of a jazz influence in the three tracks ("Who's to Say", "Piu Lento" and "Touch") which were broadcast on the John Peel show of 1 December 1982.

The band's fourth studio album, I'd Like to See You Again, was released in November 1982, reaching no. 2 on the indie albums chart. "The new music offered disciplined latin disco, inspired in part by Cameo." The album received mixed reviews. "ACR aren't sounding like ACR anymore so much as the latest New York disco imports" (New Musical Express, 1982) "I'd Like to See You Again represented an aesthetic low. In striving for a more accessible sound, the group had become overly clinical." (Adrian Thrills, New Musical Express, August 1985)

==== Founders leave ====
The band's two founding members, Topping and Terrell, left the band in late 1982. Simon Topping recorded a solo single before forming T-Coy with former Quando Quango (and later M People member) Mike Pickering. The band regrouped and returned in October 1983 with the single "I Need Someone Tonight" (with Carol McKenzie on vocals), another top-10 indie hit. Tony Quigley of Kalima joined on saxophone, and the band released three singles in late 1984 and 1985 – "Life's a Scream" (December 1984), "Brazilia" (February 1985) and "Wild Party" (June 1985).

The Old and the New, a compilation album bringing together many of the non-album singles released from ACR's formation up to the end of 1985, came out on Factory Records in January 1986. Connell left in 1985 to form Swing Out Sister, whose lead vocalist Corinne Drewery guested on ACR's next studio album, Force (1986), their last for Factory, released in November 1986. Stuart James co-produced the album with the band. It was recorded and mixed between July and August 1986 at Yello 2 Studios in Stockport, Greater Manchester. The album received good reviews from music critics, and spent nine weeks on the UK Independent Albums Chart, peaking at No. 2. "Mickey Way" was the first single from the album, released exclusively in the UK. "Bootsy" was the second single from the album and was released exclusively in Australia. Neither single charted. In January 1986, ACR performed live on Channel 4 music show The Tube.

=== 1989–1997: A&M, Rob's Records, and Creation Records ===
New releases were sparse during the next two years. Dojo Records released a 1985 live recording as Live in America in February 1987, and Italian label Materiali Sonori released the Greeting Four EP five months later. The band signed a recording contract with A&M Records in 1989, the line-up now consisted of Kerr, Moscrop, Johnson, and Quigley, the first releases for the label the singles "The Big E" and "Backs to the Wall", which preceded the band's sixth studio album Good Together, released in September 1989. A 50–minute recording of a live show from London was broadcast on British television in October. They also set up their own SoundStation studio in Manchester. The band's only significant chart success with A&M came with the 1990 single "Won't Stop Loving You", which peaked at no. 55 on the UK Singles Chart, although the first two singles also made the lower reaches of the chart. The studio album acr:mcr (1990) followed bringing a new generation of fans from the dance/club scene to ACR. But the band were then dropped from the label.

In 1991, they signed with Rob's Records, owned by New Order manager and former Factory Records partner Rob Gretton, releasing a string of singles and the album Up in Downsville (1992). In 1994, Creation Records began reissuing the band's albums on the Rev-Ola sub-label, and also released two EPs of remixes. The band's first original material for almost three years was released in August 1996, with the live Soundstation Volume 1 EP, followed in November with the band's ninth studio album Change the Station. A second Soundstation live EP was released in March 1997, the band's last release for some time.

In 2002, Soul Jazz Records reissued the albums with bonus tracks (but using the same masters as the Creation editions). Further re-issues and a live recording from 1980 were also made available on the LTM label.

=== 21st century return ===
The band played occasional live shows between 2002 and 2007, and performed in the US for the first time since 1985 on 16 November 2008, headlining the Part Time Punks festival at The Echo in Los Angeles, releasing a new studio album Mind Made Up the same month, on French label Le Maquis. They performed a headline set at the Offset Festival in London in September 2009, playing alongside fellow post-punk artists the Slits, following a one-off live performance commemorating Factory Records in Dublin, in March that year. They performed at the Plan K, Molenbeek in West Brussels on 12 December 2009 as part of the event, A Factory Night (And Then Again). This event also featured Section 25, the Wake, the Names and Biting Tongues. Towards the end of 2009, the band announced a live appearance at a fund-raising event at Brighton's Concorde 2 venue on 7 March 2010. Their 2008 studio album, Mind Made Up was re-issued via LTM Recordings during 2010, along with a redux version of the 1986 studio album, Force.

In 2018, Mute Records began reissuing their back catalogue, they released acr:set, an album of mostly old tracks with two new tracks, one ("Dirty Boy") recorded with Barry Adamson of Magazine and featuring a recording of Tony Wilson, and undertook a tour of the UK with dates in Ireland and Finland. In November 2018 they recorded a session for Marc Riley's BBC Radio 6 Music show, performing new song "Dirty Boy", "Mickey Way", and "Flight".

They released a box set, a 40th anniversary retrospective named acr:box, in May 2019 and toured in support of this. It consists of 53 songs providing a detailed career overview to date. A Certain Ratio released ACR Loco in September 2020 on Mute. Their first album of new material in 12 years featured three of the original band members – Jez Kerr, Martin Moscrop, and Donald Johnson – along with members of the band's current live ensemble. This was followed by three EP releases and remix album Loco Remezclada in 2021. ACR's eleventh studio album, 1982, was released in 2023. Their twelfth studio album, It All Comes Down to This was released in 2024.

== In film ==
"Wild Party" was used in the soundtrack of the British romantic comedy film Letter to Brezhnev (1985). "Shack Up" was used in the soundtrack of Patrice Chéreau's Intimacy (2001). The band are featured in the biographical comedy drama film 24 Hour Party People (2002) where Tony Wilson (played by Steve Coogan) describes them as "having all the energy of Joy Division but better clothes". Martin Moscrop was musical supervisor of the film.

== Discography ==
Studio albums

- The Graveyard and the Ballroom (1980)
- To Each... (1981)
- Sextet (1982)
- I'd Like to See You Again (1982)
- Force (1986)
- Good Together (1989)
- acr:mcr (1990)
- Up in Downsville (1992)
- Change the Station (1997)
- Mind Made Up (2008)
- ACR Loco (2020)
- 1982 (2023)
- It All Comes Down to This (2024)
