= Factory Benelux discography =

Factory Benelux was the Belgian imprint of Factory Records, operated by Les Disques du Crépuscule from August 1980 until March 1988, releasing a large number of exclusive recordings as well as Benelux issues of regular Factory releases. The imprint was founded by Michel Duval and Annik Honoré. A detailed history of both Factory Benelux and Crépuscule can be found in the book Shadowplayers: The Rise & Fall of Factory Records by James Nice (Aurum Press, 2010).

Factory Benelux was reactivated in 2012 by James Nice for select reissues and special editions, as well as new recordings by original FBN artists.

Catalogue number	Artist	Title	Format	Date	Notes
FAC-BN-1-004	A Certain Ratio	Shack Up (3:21) / And Then Again (2:29)	7"	1980-07	Also Crepuscule TWI-004
FAC-BN-2-005, FBN-2	The Durutti Column	Lips that Would Kiss (Form Prayers to Broken Stone) (3:40) / Madeleine (3:00)	7", 12"	1980-10	Also Crepuscule TWI-005
FBN-2CD	The Durutti Column	Lips That Would Kiss	CD	1991	Compilation of Durutti Column recordings for Factory Benelux, including tracks from unreleased album "Short Stories For Pauline" (see FBN-36).
FAC-BN-3-006	Section 25	Charnel Ground (3:55) / Haunted (3:17)	7"	1980-10	Also Crepuscule 006
FBN-3-045-CD	Section 25	Always Now	2×CD	2015-04-06	1981 album plus singles, Peel Sessions and live tracks
FAC-BN-4	Crispy Ambulance	Live on a Hot August Night (The Presence (13:01) / Concorde Square (9:07))	12"	1981-06	
FACBN-4-011	Claude Stassart	Factory Night	poster	1980-10	Poster for "Factory Night "show at Free University of Brussels, 31 October 1980: A Certain Ratio, Section 25, Durutti Column, The Names. Designed by Claude Stassart.
FAC-BN-5	Section 25	Je Veux Ton Amour (5:16) / Oyo Achel Ada (4:21)	7"	1981-08	
FBN-5	Blurt	Live In Berlin	10" mini-album	2013-02-11	1980 release cancelled as band had left Factory; later issued on Armageddon as In Berlin, and finally issued on 10" (with bonus 7") as FBN 5 in February 2013
FAC-BN-6	Crawling Chaos	The Gas Chair	LP	1982-01	
FACBN-6	Manhattan Project	Nicky	7"		unreleased
FAC-BN-7	Various Artists	A Factory Complication	VHS, Beta	1981-11	UK: Ikon FCL IKON-1
FBN-8	New Order	Everything's Gone Green (5:33) // Mesh (3:25) / Cries & Whispers (3:00)	12"	1981-12	CD single FBN-8CD 1990
FBN-9	The Names	Calcutta (3:02) / Postcards (3:43)	7"/12"	1982-02	
FBN-9CD	The Names	Swimming + Singles	CD	1991	Album plus Factory and Crepuscule recordings; later reissued on LTM
FBN-9	The Names	Swimming	2×LP	2013-02-11	Reissue of 1982 Crépuscule LP, with bonus tracks
FBN-9-CD	The Names	Swimming	CD	2013-02-11	Reissue of 1982 Crépuscule LP, with bonus tracks (different from LP and previous FBN-9-CD)
FBN-10	The Durutti Column	Deux Triangles (Favourite Painting (4:59) / Zinni (5:58) // Piece for Out of Tune Grande [sic] Piano (12:55))	12"	1982-10	
FBN-10-CD	The Durutti Column	LC	CD	2013-02-11	Reissue with bonus CD of compilation tracks and demos
FBN-11	Minny Pops	Time (3:40) / Lights (3:40)	7"	1982-04	
FBN-11(-CD)	A Certain Ratio	Sextet	LP, 2×CD	2014-11-03	Reissue of FACT-55 with 12" and Peel Session tracks, more on CD
FBN-12	Crispy Ambulance	The Plateau Phase	LP	1982-03	CD FBN-12CD, 1990, with 3 extra tracks as Comprising: The Plateau Phase, Live On A Hot August Night, Sexus; also reissued 2013-02-11 with original title and sleeve
FBN-13	Various Artists	Vinyl Magazine flexi (Minny Pops "Een Kus" (0:38) / Mental: "Love In My Heart" (2:26))	7" flexidisc	1981-11	Included with Vinyl (Netherlands) #8, November 1981
FBN-14	Section 25	The Key of Dreams	LP	1982-06	
FAC-BN-15	Minny Pops	Sparks in a Dark Room	LP	1982-06	
FBN-15-CD	Minny Pops	Sparks in a Dark Room	CD	2014-02-17	with second CD of live performance 20 April 2012
FBN-16	Swamp Children	Taste What's Rhythm (6:00) / You've Got Me Beat (4:55) / Softly Saying Goodbye (4:08)	12"	1982-09	
FBN-17	A Certain Ratio	Guess Who? (6:50)	12"	1982-07	
FBN-17-CD	A Certain Ratio	I'd Like to See You Again	CD	2013-07	Reissue of FACT-65 with 5 bonus tracks
FBN-18	Crispy Ambulance	Sexus (6:08) / Black Death/Life Is Knife (8:04)	12"	1984-04	
FBN-19	Stockholm Monsters	Miss Moonlight (4:45) // The Longing (1:46) / Lafayette (2:29)	12"	1983-03	
FBN-20	52nd Street	Cool As Ice (7:25) / Twice As Nice (7:40)	12"	1983-06	
FBN-20-BIS	52nd Street	Cool As Ice (Jellybean Restructure) (7:29) / Twice As Nice (7:40)	12"	1983-06	Also on A&M US "Of Factory New York" as FBN-20
FBN-21	Swamp Children	So Hot	LP	1982-10	Same tracks as UK version FACT-70 but different sleeve
FBN-22	New Order	Murder (3:55) / Thieves Like Us Instrumental (6:57)	12"	1984-05	
FBN-23	Quando Quango	Love Tempo (7:03) / Love Tempo (Mix)	12"	1983-06	
FBN-23-BIS	Quando Quango	Love Tempo (Mark Kamins Mix) / Love Tempo (Mix)	12"	1983-06	
FBN-23-TER	Quando Quango	Love Tempo (Benelux Edit) (3:18) / Love Tempo (Mix) (3:49)	7"	1983-06	
FBN 24	The Wake	Something Outside (7:42) / Host (7:55)	12"	1983-10	
FBN 25	Cabaret Voltaire	Yashar (5:00) / Yashar (7:20)	12"	1983-07	Also FAC-82-12 - but only FBN edition has picture sleeve
FBN-26	Surprize	In Movimento (5:35) / Parador Style (5:20) // Over Italia (4:18) / Stavolta (7:10)	12"	1984-04	EP tracks produced by Bernard Sumner and Donald Johnson.
FBN-26-CD	Surprize	In Movimento	CD	2013-08	CD reissue with 6 extra tracks
FBN-27	Various Artists	Factory Benelux Greatest Hits	LP	1983-12	
FBN-28	Nyam Nyam	Fate/Hate (8:03) / So Long Ago (5:39) / Fate/Hate (Dub) (4:00)	12"	1984-04	
FBN-29	The Wake	Harmony	LP	1984	Contains extra track "Chance" not on FACT-60
FBN-29-CD	The Wake	Harmony	CD	2013-02-11	Includes FBN-24 and 1983 Peel session; identical to LTM LTMCD-2323 (2001)
FBN-29	The Wake	Harmony	2×LP	2013-08-26	includes FBN-24 and 1983 Peel session
FBN-30	The Durutti Column	Another Setting	LP	1984	LP track listing incorrect; same as FACT-74
FBN-30-CD	The Durutti Column	Another Setting	CD	2015-10	bonus tracks
FBN-30	The Durutti Column	Another Setting	2×LP	2018-03-10	800 copies; second LP: live at Pandora's Box Festival, Rotterdam, 4 September 1983
FBN-31	Stockholm Monsters	Alma Mater			FACT-80, never released by FBN but assigned number
FBN-32	A Certain Ratio	Brazilia	12"	1984-12	
FBN-33	Section 25	From the Hip	LP		Benelux release of FACT-90. Test pressing only, not released
FBN-33-CD	Section 25	From the Hip	CD	2014-05-05	extra CD of remixes and sessions
FBN-34	Lavolta Lakota	Prayer (3:33) / Mitawin (3:15)	7"	1984-07	
FBN-35	The Wake	Talk About the Past			FAC-88, never released by FBN but assigned number
FBN-35-CD	The Wake	Here Comes Everybody	CD	2014	reissue of FACT-130
FBN-35-CD	The Wake	Here Comes Everybody	2×CD	2015-05-04	30th anniversary reissue, with second disc of singles, sessions and demos
FBN-36	The Durutti Column	Circuses and Bread	LP, Cassette	1985-05	FBN-36 was originally to have been unreleased album Short Stories for Pauline
FBN-36	The Durutti Column	Short Stories for Pauline	LP/CD	2012-06-18	Limited edition vinyl (1000 copies) in 2012, followed by unlimited CD in 2013
FBN-37	Life	Dites Moi (3:10) / Tell Me Theme (3:10) / Tell Me (3:10)	12"	1984-07	French language version of "Tell Me" (FAC-106)
FBN-38	Life	Dites Moi			Unreleased 7" of FBN-37
FBN-38	Tunnelvision	Watching The Hydroplanes	LP	2019-05	Limited edition vinyl (500 copies)
FBN-39	La Cosa Nostra	Coming Closer	12"	1984-10	
FBN-40	La Cosa Nostra	Coming Closer	7"	1984-10	
FBN-41	Simon Topping	Prospect Park (4:54) / Chicas Del Mundo (5:01) Mission and 24 (6:21)	12"	1985-02	
FBN-42	Life	Better (3:10) / Optimism (4:35) / Optimism [instrumental] (4:35)	12"	1985-04	
FBN-43	Marcel King	Reach For Love	12"	1985-03	Same A-side as FAC-92-R (New York remix), B-side is dub version
FBN-44	Stanton Miranda	Wheels Over Indian Trails	7", 12"	1986-05	
FBN-45	Section 25	Crazy Wisdom (4:33) / Dirty Disco II (5:19) /Guitar Waltz (3:00)	12"	1985-09	Almost released on 7" as FAC-132.
FBN-45-CD	Section 25	Love & Hate	CD	2013-05-20	different bonus tracks to 1999 LTM reissue CD
FBN-46	Stockholm Monsters	How Corrupt Is Rough Trade? (5:14) / Kan Kill! (7:19)	12"	1985-08	
FBN-47	The Executioner	Executioner's Theme	7"		Unreleased collaboration by Paul Haig and Cabaret Voltaire. Versions on Paul Haig European Sun LP and After Twilight CD and various artists The Quick Neat Job cassette compilation.
FBN-48	The Executioner	Executioner's Theme	12"		Unreleased 12" of FBN-47
FBN-49	Playgroup	Euphoria	12"	1985-08	
FBN-50	Playgroup	Euphoria	7"	1985-07	Test pressing only, not released
FBN-51	The Durutti Column	Tomorrow (4:03) / Tomorrow (live in Japan) (3:00) / All That Love and Maths Can Do (3:33)	7", 12"	1986-03	"All That Love and Maths Can Do" only on 12"
FBN-52	Various Artists	The Factory Complication 1	LP		Unreleased compilation, announced early 1986 but never finished
FBN-52(-CD)	Durutti Column	Domo Arigato	3×CD+DVD, 2×LP+7"	2017-04	Expanded and remixed version of FACT-144
7-FBN-53	Section 25	Reflection (Young Image) / Change	7"	2014-04-19	For Record Store Day 2014
FBN-54	Crispy Ambulance	Compulsion	LP	2015-04-18	500-copy vinyl edition for Record Store Day
FBN-55	Various Artists	The Factory Complication 2	LP		Unreleased compilation, announced early 1986 but never finished
FBN-55(-CD)	Various Artists	Of Factory New York	2×LP, CD	2014	Benefit album for Michael Shamberg of Factory US and Of Factory New York
FBN-56	Durutti Column	The Durutti Column Postcard Set	box of 25 postcards	2017-05	
FBN-57	Factory Benelux	Factory Benelux teeshirt	T-shirt	2012-12	Limited edition of 50 T-shirts with FBN logo
FBN-60	Various Artists	New Order Presents Be Music	2×LP, 3×CD	2017-02	Recordings produced by members of New Order
7-FBN-62	Section 25	My Outrage / Hinterland	7"	2013-04	500 copies only for Record Store Day, 2013.
FBN-63-CD	The Durutti Column	Treatise on the Steppenwolf	CD	2013-05	identical to LTMCD 2518, 2008
FBN-64	The Wake	A Light Far Out	LP	2013-04	Limited edition of 500 copies, vinyl only.
FBN-65	Martin Hannett and Steve Hopkins	The Invisible Girls	CD	2015-02	Rare and unreleased recordings
FBN-73	Section 25	Mirror / You Leave Me No Choice	7"	2015-04-18	500 copies for Record Store Day, 2015
FBN-81	Crispy Ambulance	Random Textures + Compulsion	2×CD	2016-06-19	second CD is FBN-54
FBN-84(-CD)	Durutti Column	Without Mercy	4×CD, 2×LP	2018-10-01	
FBN-94	The Wake	Clouds Disco / The Sun is a Star	7"	2015-04-18	500-copy edition for Record Store Day 2015
FBN-95	The Wake	Testament (Best Of)	CD	2014	
FBN-100	The Durutti Column	For Patti / Weakness And Fever	7"	1982-10	Limited edition of 100 copies with FBN-10.
FBN-100	New Order	Low-Life	LP, Cassette	1985-05	Same as FACT-100. Number FBN-100 was reused.
FBN-110-CD	Quando Quango	Pigs + Battleships	CD	2013-06	FACT 110 was also pressed by Factory Benelux in 1985 (with the UK catalogue number). 2013 CD edition uses "composite" catalogue number and has five bonus tracks; different bonus tracks to LTM 2003 reissue
FBN-111-CD	Mark Reeder	Collaborator	CD	2014-04	Compilation of remixes of various mostly-Factory- or Crépuscule-associated bands
FBN-112(-CD)	The Names	In Time	CD, LP	2014-01-14	
FBN-113; TWI-1174	Various Artists	Sampler et Sans Reproche	CD	2014-11-09	Factory Benelux/Crépuscule sampler CD, given away with mail-orders
FBN-114	Durutti Column	The Return of the Durutti Column	LP+7"	2013-12-08	Sandpaper on front of sleeve
FBN-114-CD	Durutti Column	The Return of the Durutti Column	CD	2013-03-23	Vinyl tracks, plus six bonus tracks from rare second pressing of original FACT-10
FBN-119(-CD)	The Names	Stranger Than You	CD, LP	2015-05-18	
FBN-122-CD	The Names	German Nights	CD	2017-09	
FBN-123	New Order	The Perfect Kiss	7", 12"	1985-05	12" includes "The Perfect Dub" (not on FAC-123), different sleeves based on sleeve of Low Life
FBN-124	Section 25	Alfresco	LP+CD	2016-04-16	500 edition live LP+CD for Record Store Day
FBN-125; TWI-1234	Various Artists	Noblesse Oblige	CD	2017	Factory Benelux/Crépuscule sampler CD, given away with mail-orders
FBN-127	The Other Two	The Other Disc	CD	2020-02	bonus CD with Super Highways (FBN-390)
FBN-145-CD	Section 25	Dark Light	CD	2013-02-25	First all-new release by resurrected label
FBN-146 TWI-1244	Various Artists	Constellation de Comportements	CD	2018-12-04	Factory Benelux/Crépuscule sampler CD, given away with mail-orders. Cover lists number as FBN-125.
FBN-150	New Order	Brotherhood	LP	1986-09	Same as FACT-150
FBN-153	New Order	State of the Nation / Shame of the Nation	12"	1986-09	Same as FAC-153
FBN-158 TWI-1254	Various Artists	The Cold Open	CD	2020-06	Factory Benelux/Crépuscule sampler CD, given away with mail-orders.
FBN-164(-CD)	Durutti Column	M24J	2×LP+7", 2×CD	2018-09	compilation
FBN-204(-CD)	Durutti Column	The Guitar and Other Machines	2×LP, 3×CD	2018-01	
FBN-244	Durutti Column	Vini Reilly + WOMAD Live	3×CD	2020-01	Double album of FAC-244 plus bonus tracks; optional third CD "I Know Very Well How I Got My Note Wrong" with Morrissey
FBN-274-CD	Durutti Column	Obey The Time	3×CD	2019-04	
FBN-390	The Other Two	Super Highways	CD	2020-02	With optional bonus CD The Other Disc (FBN-127)
FBN-839-6, FBN-839-7	New Order	Touched by the Hand of God	7", 12"	1987-12	Same as FAC-193
TWI-774	Various Artists	Salvation!	LP	1988-02	Factory Benelux/Crépuscule, issued in other countries by Factory affiliates as FACT-182

== See also ==
- Factory Records discography
