= Shadowplayers =

2006 documentary film

Shadowplayers is the title of both a 2006 documentary film and a 2010 book by James Nice of LTM Recordings, tracing the detailed history of Factory Records and the Manchester post-punk music scene between 1978 and 1981.

== Film ==
The documentary oral history film Shadowplayers (full title Shadowplayers – Factory Records & Manchester Post Punk 1978-81) was released on DVD in May 2006.

The extended film features interviews with 22 key participants, including company director Anthony H. Wilson and designer Peter Saville, as well as a host of musicians including Peter Hook (Joy Division/New Order), Simon Topping (A Certain Ratio), Vini Reilly (Durutti Column), Larry and Vin Cassidy (Section 25) and Howard Devoto (Buzzcocks/Magazine). Other featured artists include members of Cabaret Voltaire, Crispy Ambulance, Biting Tongues, Minny Pops, The Names, Swamp Children, Thick Pigeon, and Killing Joke, as well as contributions from Richard Boon, Annik Honoré, Lindsay Reade, and Richard Jobson.

Shadowplayers runs for 2 hours and 15 minutes and is divided into 19 chapters, covering subjects such as the Factory Club, sleeve art and graphic design, producer Martin Hannett, the riot at Joy Division's concert at The Derby Hall, Bury in April 1980, Factory Benelux and connections with Les Disques du Crépuscule and the Plan K venue in Brussels, the suicide of Ian Curtis, the beginnings of New Order, and the decline of post-punk culture after 1981.

Based exclusively on first-person narrative, Shadowplayers features soundtrack music by Section 25 and New Order, as well as rare images and graphics, and a cover design based on the first Factory poster (Fac 1) by Peter Saville.

== Book ==
Shadowplayers (subtitled The Rise and Fall of Factory Records) is a related music history book written by Nice and published by Aurum in May 2010. The book tells the story of Factory Records from its early beginnings up until its demise in 1992. The book was launched at the London record shop Rough Trade East by the author and included a short live performance by original Factory Records band Blurt and a speech by designer Peter Saville.
