= Alma mater (disambiguation) =

Alma mater is an allegorical Latin phrase for a university or college.

Alma mater may also refer to:

== Organizations ==
- Alma Mater Society of Queen's University, the central undergraduate student government of Queen's University in Kingston, Ontario, Canada
- Alma Mater Society of the University of British Columbia, the complete student government of the University of British Columbia, Vancouver, Canada

== Universities ==
- Alma Mater Europaea, an international university founded by the European Academy of Sciences and Arts, with headquarters in Salzburg, Austria
- Alma Mater Studiorum ("Nourishing mother of studies"), the name of the University of Bologna, Italy

== Art, entertainment, and media ==
=== Music ===
==== School songs ====
- Alma mater (song), the official song or anthem of a school, college, or university
- "Alma Mater" (Dartmouth College), the official school song of Dartmouth College, New Hampshire, US
- "Alma Mater," the official school song of the University of Chicago, Chicago, US
- "Hail Alma Mater", the informal title of "Marquette University Anthem," a formal school song of Marquette University, Wisconsin, US
- "Hail Alma Mater", a formal school song of McGill University, Montreal, Quebec, Canada
- "University of Pittsburgh Alma Mater", an official song of the University of Pittsburgh, Pennsylvania, US

==== Albums ====
- Alma Mater (Pope Benedict XVI album), 2009
- Alma Mater (Stockholm Monsters album), 1984
- Alma Mater, a 2000 Portuguese album and song by Rodrigo Leão (musician)

==== Recorded songs ====
- "Alma Mater", a song on the 1972 album School's Out by Alice Cooper
- "Alma Mater", a song on B-side of the 1972 single Saturday in the Park by Chicago
- "Alma Mater", a song from Carrie (musical) (1988)
- "Alma Mater" ("Альма-матер"), a 1991 Russian song by Viktor Berkovsky
- "Alma Mater", a song on the 1995 album Wolfheart by Moonspell
- "Alma Mater", a song on the 2018 album Time Will Die and Love Will Bury It by Rolo Tomassi
- "Alma Matters", a 1997 single by Morrissey

=== Film, television, and theatre ===
- Alma Mater (film), a 2004 Uruguayan film, nominated to the Goya Award for Best Iberoamerican Film
- Alma Mater (play), a 1971 BBC Play for Today
- Alma Mater, a 2002 American film directed by Hans Canosa
- "Chuck Versus the Alma Mater" (2007), season 1, episode 7 of the television series, Chuck
- Alma Mater, a 1934 ballet composed by Kay Swift for George Balanchine
- Alma Matters: Inside the IIT Dream, a 2021 Indian docu-series

=== Visual arts ===
- Alma Mater (Illinois sculpture), a 1929 sculpture by Lorado Taft on the University of Illinois campus in Urbana, Illinois, US
- Alma Mater (New York sculpture), a 1903 sculpture by Daniel Chester French on the Columbia University campus in New York City, New York, US
- Alma Mater (Missouri sculpture), a 1916 three-figure sculpture by Cyrus E. Dallin on the campus of Mary Institute and St. Louis Country Day School in Ladue, Missouri, US
- Alma Mater, a painting in a 1909–1916 series by Edvard Munch, for the University of Oslo

=== Other media ===
- Alma Mater, an academic publication produced by Jagiellonian University, Kraków, Poland
- Alma Mater (role-playing game), a 1982 role-playing game

== Other uses ==
- Alma mater, the title of a papal bull issued by Pope Clement V on April 4, 1310
