= Harmony (The Wake album) =

Album by The Wake

Studio album by The Wake
- Released: October 1982
- Studio: Strawberry Studios, Stockport
- Genre: Post-punk
- Label: Factory FACT-60
- Producer: Chris Nagle, The Wake

The Wake chronology
Harmony (1982)	Here Comes Everybody (1985)

The Wake is the debut studio album by Scottish post-punk band The Wake, released in 1982. The album is also known as Harmony.

It was reissued on Factory Benelux in 1984), LTM Recordings in 2001 (as Harmony + Singles) and Factory Benelux again in 2013 (CD and double LP).

== Reception ==
Professional ratings
Review scores
Source	Rating
AllMusic	4/5 stars
The A.V. Club	unfavourable

Tim Sendra of AllMusic stated, "The Wake may have been working with an established template, but Caesar's vision, the emotional impact of his songs, and the fantastic amounts of energy the band put in, all combine to make it a sterling example of a sound instead of a group of imitators."

== Track listing ==
All tracks composed by Scottish post-punk band The Wake

Factory FACT-60, 1982

Side 1:

1. "Judas" 3:18
2. "Testament" 2:16
3. "Patrol" 3:30
4. "The Old Men" 5:50

Side 2:

1. "Favour" 4:13
2. "Heartburn" 4:58
3. "An Immaculate Conception" 5:01

Factory Benelux FBN-29, 1984
same as FACT-60 with extra track "Chance" end of side 2 not listed on sleeve

LTM LTMCD-2323, 2001
Factory Benelux FBN-29-CD, 2013

1. "Favour" 4:13
2. "Heartburn" 4:58
3. "An Immaculate Conception" 5:01
4. "Judas" 3:18
5. "Testament" 2:16
6. "Patrol" 3:30
7. "The Old Men" 5:50
8. "Chance" 3:47
9. "Something Outside" 7:42
10. "Host" 7:55
11. "The Drill" 4:18
12. "Uniform" 5:29
13. "Here Comes Everybody" 6:58
14. "On Our Honeymoon" 2:07
15. "Give Up" 2:35

Factory Benelux FBN-29, 2013

Side 1:

1. "Judas" 04:20
2. "Testament" 05:06
3. "Patrol" 05:07
4. "The Old Men" 03:27

Side 2:

1. "Favor" 02:21
2. "Heartburn" 03:36
3. "An Immaculate Conception" 06:10
4. "Chance" 03:25

Side 3:

1. "Something Outside" 07:52
2. "Host" 08:00

Side 4:

1. "The Drill" (Peel Session) 04:24
2. "Uniform" (Peel Session) 05:35
3. "Here Comes Everybody" (Peel Session) 07:05
