= Blurt =

English post-punk band

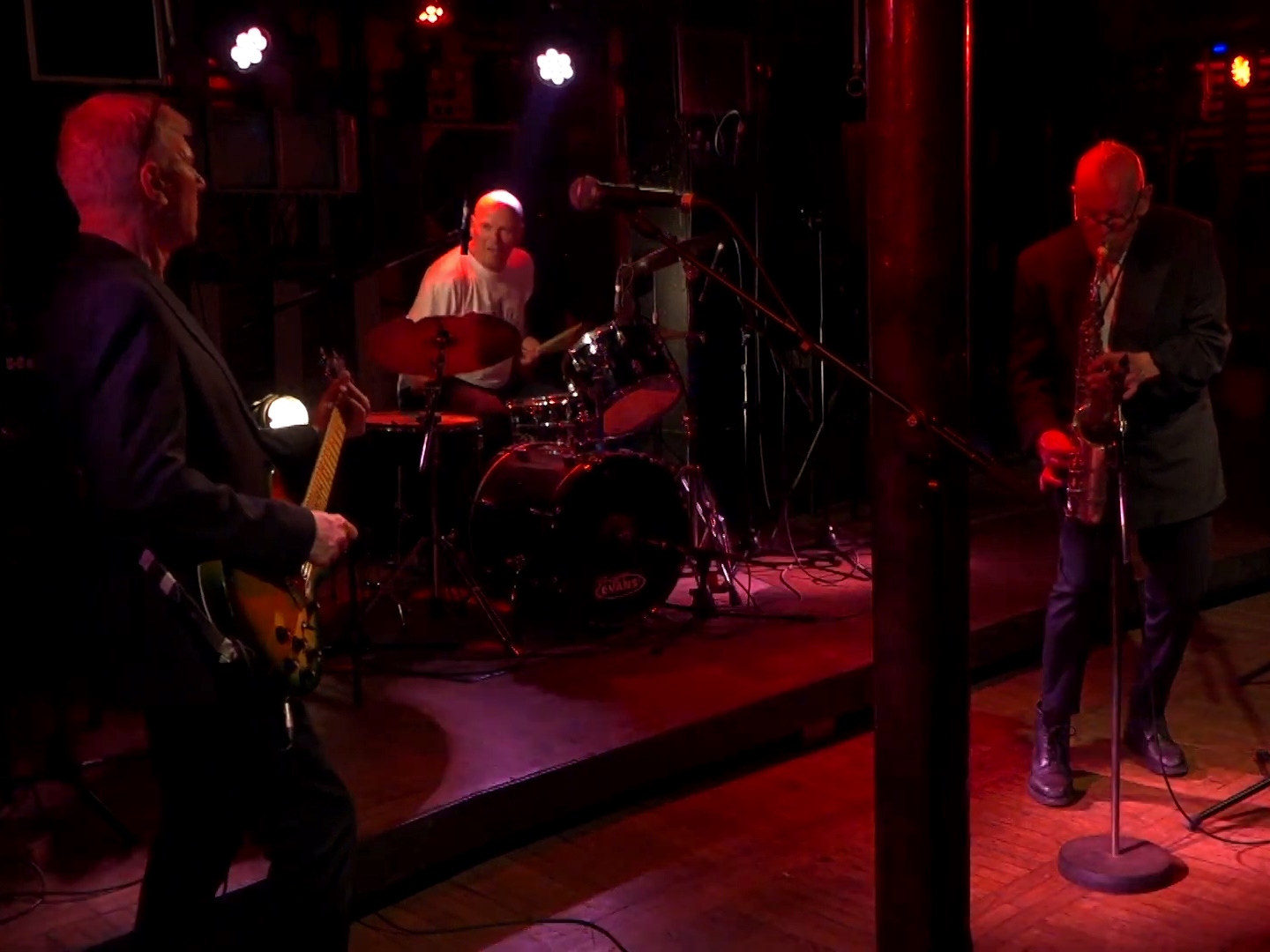
- Blurt live at MS Stubnitz, Hamburg, 19 May 2022

Background information
- Origin: Stroud, Gloucestershire, England
- Genres: Post-punk; no wave; jazz-rock; art rock; new wave
- Years active: 1979–present
- Labels: Factory; Test Pressings; Armageddon; Red Flame; Big Balumbas In Burundi; Divine; Another Side; Toeblock; Moving Target; Heute; Bahia; Salamander; LTM; The Orchestra Pit Recording Co.; Factory Benelux; Blank Editions; Sartorial; Metadrone; Klanggalerie; Old Heaven Books; Improved Sequence; All City
- Members: Ted Milton; Steve Eagles; David Aylward
- Past members: Jake Milton; Peter Creese; Herman Martin; Nic Murcott; Paul Wigens; Chris Vine; Charles Hayward; Bob Leith
- Website: tedmilton.net

Blurt is an English post-punk band, founded in 1979 in Stroud, Gloucestershire.

== Background ==
Blurt was founded in 1979 in Stroud, Gloucestershire by poet, saxophonist and puppeteer Ted Milton along with Milton's brother Jake, formerly of psychedelic group Quintessence, on drums and Peter Creese on guitar. After three albums Creese left the band to be replaced by Herman Martin on synthesizers who, after a year of constant touring, left the band and was replaced by Steve Eagles, former member of Satan's Rats, The Photos and Bang Bang Machine.

Shortly thereafter Jake Milton left to be replaced by Nic Murcott, who was subsequently replaced by Paul Wigens. Eagles was replaced by Chris Vine as guitarist from 1990 to 1994 and returned to the band following Vine's departure. Wigens was briefly replaced by Charles Hayward between May and October 2001 before returning to the band, before departing the band for good in 2005. His replacement was Bob Leith (of Cardiacs), who stayed with the band until 2008, at which time he was replaced by the band's current drummer David Aylward.

Most of Blurt's compositions feature simple, repetitive, minimalistic guitar and/or saxophone phrases, but they can also explore more abstract musical territories, often serving as an atmospheric backdrop for Ted Milton's existentialist poetry.

== Personnel ==
Current members

- Ted Milton – saxophone (1979–present)
- Steve Eagles – guitar (1984–1990, 1994–present)
- David Aylward – drums (2008–present)

Former members

- Jake Milton – drums (1979–1988)
- Peter Creese – guitar (1979–1984)
- Herman Martin – synthesiser (1986–1987)
- Nic Murcott – drums (1988)
- Paul Wigens – drums (1988–2001, 2001–2005)
- Chris Vine – guitar (1990–1994)
- Charles Hayward – drums (2001)
- Bob Leith – drums (2005–2008)

== Discography ==
Studio albums

- Blurt (1982)
- Friday the 12th (1985)
- Poppycock (1986)
- Smoke Time (1987)
- Kenny Rogers' Greatest Hit (Take 2) (1989)
- The Kenny Rogers Greatest Hit (1991)
- Pagan Strings (1992)
- Celebrating the Bespoke Cell of Little Ease (1998)
- Cut It! (2010)
- Beneath Discordant Skies (2015)

EPs

- White Line Fever (1984)
- The Body That They Built (1988)

Live albums

- In Berlin (1981)
- Bullets for You (1984)
- The Body Live! (1989)
- My Mother Was a Friend of an Enemy of fhe People (2024)

Compilation albums

- The Best of Blurt – Volume 1 – The Fish Needs a Bike (2003)
- The Best of Blurt – Volume 2 – The Body That They Built to Fit the Car (2006)
- The Factory Recordings (2008)
- Blurt + Singles (2009)

Singles

- "My Mother Was a Friend of an Enemy of the People"/"Get" (1980)
- "The Fish Needs a Bike"/"This Is My Royal Wedding Souvenir" (1981)
- "Trees" (live)/"Some Come" (live) (1982)
- "Spill the Beans"/"The Ruminant Plinth" (1983)
- "The Body That They Built to Fit the Car"/"Micky" (1987)
- "Cut It!"/"Hat" (2008)
