= Repetition (band) =

Background information
- Origin: United Kingdom
- Genres: New wave
- Years active: 1979–1982
- Labels: Les Disques Du Crepuscule
- Members: Sarah Osbourne (vocals 1979-80, 1982); Tim Transe (drums); Pete Petrol (guitar); Nicolas (bass guitar); Andy Hooper (keyboards); Steve Musham (vocals,1981)
- Website: Myspace.com

Repetition were an English post-punk (also dubbed as Belgian post-punk) band from London, which formed in August 1979. The band's initial line up was ex SpizzOil guitarist Pete Petrol, Ex Xtraverts drummer Tim Transe, keyboard player A.S.D.H. (Andy Hooper), bassist AWOL (Nicholas), and vocalist Sarah Osbourne.

== Career ==
The band were signed to Les Disques du Crépuscule after gaining the interest of Annik Honoré in 1979. Their first single "A Still Reflex" (b-side, "Fade Out") was released in January 1981 was recorded at Spaceward Studios in Saffron Walden and notably produced by Joy Division manager, Rob Gretton. Owing to the connection with Brussels-based Les Disques du Crepuscule the band toured in Belgium and the Netherlands in 1980 playing at Plan K in Brussels and the Effenaar in Eindhoven and appeared on Generation 80 TV show. The band were managed by Mick Scholefield who later went on to start Heist Or Hit Records.

Steve Musham joined the band during this period, playing bass initially, and then replacing Osbourne on vocals on the next single, "A Full Rotation", recorded at Berry Street Studios in London, in 1980. The band recorded a John Peel session at Maida Vale studios on 8 August 1981. The session of four tracks was recorded with a line-up of vocalist/guitarist Steve Musham, ex Spizzenergi bassist and guitarist Jim Solar, Tim Transe (drums) and Andy Hooper (keyboards).

On 13 July, Repetition, Marine, Eric Random, Richard Jobson & The Swamp Children performed during a Crepuscule Night at Heaven in London. The event was covered in NME and a cassette souvenir 'Rendez-Vous Au Paradis' was announced but did not appear.

Another incarnation of the band, consisting of Hooper, Petrol, Musham, Hoser, Sparkes and Laurenson, recorded one final single, "A Will To Win" on Red Flame Records.

Keyboard player Andy Hooper died on 31 August 2012.

== Discography ==
=== Singles ===
- "A Still Reflex" / "Fade Out" (January 1980) – CAT: TWI012
- "A Full Rotation" / "The Body Cries" (July 1980) – CAT: TWI031
- "A Will to Win" / "Chance" / "Love What You Miss" (1982) – Red Flame

=== Compilation albums ===
- "From Brussels With Love" (November 1980) – CAT: TWI007
- "A Day in October" (December 1981) – CAT: RAD005
- "Crepuscule Collection 5 – For Tomorrow We Live" (July 1981) – CAT: TWI655
- "Rendez-Vous Au Paradis" (August 1981) – CAT: TWI046
