= In Berlin =

In Berlin may refer to:

- In Berlin (Blurt album), 1981
- In Berlin (Bonnie Tyler album), 2024
