= Michael H. Shamberg =

Michael H. Shamberg (October 27, 1952 – November 1, 2014) was an American music video producer and filmmaker known for his work with the British band, New Order. Shamberg, who was closely associated with Factory Records and New Order throughout his career, was responsible for producing some of the band's best known music videos, including “True Faith” and “Blue Monday”. Shamberg's producing credits included the 1987 music video for “True Faith”, which was nominated for "Best Music Video" at the 1988 Brit Awards. Shamberg also worked on music videos featuring numerous other musical artists, including Talking Heads, The B-52's, R.E.M., Patti Smith and Grace Jones. His music video production credits included videos directed by Kathryn Bigelow, Jonathan Demme, Robert Frank, Robert Longo, and William Wegman.

Shamberg made his feature film debut with Souvenir, a 74-minute film released in 1999. The film, which took five years to create, included Stanton Miranda, Kristin Scott Thomas, Christina Ricci, Adam Hann-Byrd and Melvil Poupaud in the cast.

== Biography and career ==
Shamberg was born in New York City in 1952 and moved to the Baltimore metropolitan area with his family when he was 2-months old. He was raised in Pikesville, Maryland, in suburban Baltimore. He studied at both Villanova University and the Pennsylvania Academy of the Fine Arts in Philadelphia. He moved to New York City during the mid-1970s after completing his studies.

Shamberg professional relationship with New Order began in 1981, when he filmed one of their concerts in New York City. He eventually produced many of New Order's best-known music videos, as well as directing some of their earliest videos. For the surreal 1987 music video for True Faith, Shamberg and director, Philippe Decouflé, utilized performance artists. Another Shamberg music video, Blue Monday, features a dog balanced on tennis balls. He explained his work with New Order in a 2006 interview, saying "Making videos was not a routine of Factory, but something fun and interesting to do." He remained close to the members of New Order after hiatuses in 1993 and 2007.

Shamberg was also the founder and former head of Factory Records U.S.

Shamberg released Souvenir, his first and only feature film, in 1999, shortly before his illness. The film, which took five years to create, included Stanton Miranda, Kristin Scott Thomas, Christina Ricci, Adam Hann-Byrd and Melvil Poupaud in the cast. Shamberg collaborated with director James Herbert, as well as Why Not Productions and Open City Films, on the production. The film focuses on an American sportswriter (Stanton Miranda) living in Paris who is consumed with childhood traumas and the death of her brother, Charles (Melvil Poupaud). In Souvenir, Shamberg ignored traditional film structures, favoring fades to black or sequences of still photographs. Indiewire called Souvenir, "a feast for the senses" that "deserves a look by anyone interested in seeing how far the film medium can go", while the Washington Post wrote that the film was "intentionally choppy." Ann Hornaday, then a film critic with the Baltimore Sun called Souvenir a "really beautifully filmed, very poetic, very intuitive. … It left a lot of questions, and I like that." Souvenir remains little known and is rarely viewed in public. It played at the first Maryland Film Festival in 1999. Shamberg also created a short film, Tribeca, which explores the post-punk band, A Certain Ratio.

Shamberg was diagnosed with a progressive neurological disease during the early 2000s. He had lived in Paris, but returned to the Baltimore area in the mid-2000s as his illness progressed. In 2011, New Order performed several benefit concerts to cover the costs of Shamberg's medical treatment.

By 2005, Shamberg was already in declining health and finding it difficult to continue day-to-day work. However, he remained committed to the promotion of art and the fostering of the arts. In 2005, Shamberg established the first of a group of centers he called "Turtle Salons," opening the first at the Chelsea Space in London. Shamberg envisioned the salons as centers where both established and emerging artists could display their creations. He called the spaces "Turtle Salons" after a protected stretch of Mediterranean coastline along the border of Israel and Lebanon which had become a haven for endangered sea turtles. Shamberg had visited the area prior to his illness. The Turtle Salons soon became places where artists and other people within the creative industries would meet to collaborate on projects and designs. New salons were expanded to locations in France, Germany, Switzerland and the United States.

Michael Shamberg died from a long illness on November 1, 2014, at the age of 62. Former New Order bassist Peter Hook paid tribute to him saying, "Michael was a lovely man. His work on our videos, so important at the time, defined our image and an era. He was a true revolutionary. One of a very small band of truly gifted individuals! He will be missed." New Order released a statement on Shamberg's death on their web site, "We are very sad to learn that our friend and colleague Michael H. Shamberg passed away on Saturday 1st November after a long illness...Michael was the founder of Factory US and New Order’s video producer, alongside his own work as filmmaker, teacher and director of Turtle Salon...His video production of "True Faith" earned "Best Music Video" at the Brit Awards 1988. We will miss him dearly and send our condolences to all his family and friends."
