= Swimming (The Names album) =

Studio album by The Names
- Released: 1982
- Genre: Post-punk
- Label: Les Disques du Crépuscule
- Producer: Martin Hannett

Swimming is the debut studio album by Belgian post-punk band the Names, released in 1982 by record label Les Disques du Crépuscule. It was produced by Martin Hannett.

== Release history ==
The album was released as an LP by Crépuscule in 1982. It was reissued by Factory Benelux in 1991 on CD as Swimming + Singles, by LTM Recordings in 2000 on CD as Swimming + Singles, and again by Factory Benelux in 2013 on LP and CD as Swimming.

== Reception ==
Professional ratings
Review scores
Source	Rating
AllMusic	3/5 stars

AllMusic wrote: "Swimming isn't the sharpest arrow in infamous producer Martin Hannett's quiver, and the Belgian group indeed wallowed in the obscurity that journalist Jon Savage claimed they didn't deserve, but the record still fares rather well as a second-tier post-punk record".
