= Operation Twilight =

- Parent company: Les Disques du Crepuscule; Rough Trade
- Founded: 1982
- Founder: Patrick Moore; Michel Duval; Geoff Travis
- Status: Defunct
- Distributor: Rough Trade
- Genre: Industrial; experimental; post-punk
- Country of origin: United Kingdom
- Location: London

Operation Twilight was a British record label, the UK branch of Belgian label Les Disques du Crépuscule. It was run by Patrick Moore, who now writes as Philip Hoare.

Moore was working for Rough Trade Records at the time, and described the genesis of Operation Twilight thus: "Geoff Travis [Rough Trade] and Michel Duval [Crépuscule] cooked up a plan in January 1982 where I would start up the UK equivalent of Les Disques du Crépuscule. Michel had a sort of James Bond idea about it — it would be the James Bond version of Crépuscule — Operation Twilight."

Operation Twilight closed in 1983, though most of the artists - including Paul Haig, Antena, Tuxedomoon, Thick Pigeon - would continue to release records on Les Disques du Crépuscule. The label is also noteworthy for launching the career of the Pale Fountains.

== Discography ==
This discography includes unreleased items that nevertheless were given a catalogue number.

No.	Artist	Title	Format	Date	Notes
OPT 001	Tuxedomoon	Divine	LP	1982-05-14	
OPT 002	Antena	The Boy from Ipanema / Spiral Staircase	7"	1982-06	Also 7" (TWI 073) and 12" (TWI 074) on Crépuscule, RAD 16 on Crépuscule Section Française
OPT 003	Paul Haig	Running Away / Time	7"	1982-05-21	UK Independent Chart #19. Also 7" (TWI 088) and 12" (TWI 089) on Crépuscule in Belgium, TWA-82501 on Crépuscule America
OPT 004	Virginia Astley		LP		Initial contracts were drawn up but never signed. Even so, the release frequently appeared on release schedules.
OPT 005	The French Impressionists		7"		A later 12" was released on Crépuscule in Belgium.
OPT 006	Howard Devoto	Heart Beats Up Love	book		Unreleased collection of Magazine lyrics
OPT 007		The Twilight Set	badges	1983	Paul Haig, Antena, The Lost Jockey, Tuxedomoon, The Pale Fountains, Matisse
OPT 008	Paul Haig	Justice	7", 12"		Reached test pressing stage; cancelled due to deal with Island
OPT 009	The Pale Fountains	(There's Always) Something On My Mind / Just A Girl	7"	1982-07	Also Crépuscule 12" TWI 118 (with different sleeve and extra track)
OPT 010	Antena		12"		
OPT 011	The Lost Jockey	Professor Slack / Rise & Fall / Animal Behaviour / Crude Din	10"		Re-released 1983 by Battersea Records as 12"
OPT 012	R.O.L.	Blue For You	12"		Paul Haig recording released as flexidisc with Masterbag #13 (8–21 July 1982); released on Crépuscule/Interference as TWI 106/INT-01
OPT 013		Robots	toy robots with projectile heads		Promotional pack
OPT 014	Paul Haig		LP		Allocated catalogue number, but by this time Haig was recording Rhythm of Life for Island.
OPT 015	The Pale Fountains	Thank You	7", 12"		Later released by Virgin
OPT 016	Mikado	Romance / Ce Garcon-La	7"	1983-01	Originally released 1982-10 as Crépuscule TWI 104
OPT 017		Twilight Star	badge		Logo badge
OPT 018	Ralf Dörper	Erazerhead (Assault / Erazerhead / Lorelei / Im Himmel)	12"	1983-02	
OPT 019	Propaganda	Diziplin	12"		cover of "Discipline" by Throbbing Gristle, Rough Trade opposed its release
OPT 020	Thick Pigeon / The French Impressionists	Santa Baby / Jingle Bell Rock	7"	1982-12	split Christmas single
OPT 021	Andy Warhol	Interview	cassette		unreleased due to copyright issues
OPT 022	Various artists	Antelopes and Alligators			
OPT 023	23 Skidoo	The Culling Is Coming	LP	1983-02	Also Crépuscule TWI 123
OPT 024	April Showers	While the City Sleeps	7"		Recorded, artwork designed, never pressed
