= Sexus =

Sexus (Latin for sex) may refer to:

- Sexus (The Rosy Crucifixion), a 1949 novel by Henry Miller
- "Sexus", a 1984 single by Crispy Ambulance
- Sexus, a 1990s English synthpop duo linked to the Romo movement
