= Unsightly and Serene =

Single by Crispy Ambulance
- B-side: "Not What I Expected"
- Released: 1980
- Recorded: June 1980
- Genre: Post-punk
- Length: 7:54
- Label: Factory
- Producer(s): Stewart Pickering

Crispy Ambulance singles chronology
"From the Cradle to the Grave (single)" (1980)	"Unsightly and Serene" (1980)	"Live on a Hot August Night" (1981)

"Unsightly and Serene" was the second release made by the Manchester post-punk band, Crispy Ambulance. It was also their first release on Factory Records, as they were signed to the label with the help of Rob Gretton who, after the death of Ian Curtis in May 1980, became a director of the label. As a member of the band said in an interview: "Tony never liked us, but suffered us because Rob liked what we did. Since he had become an equal shareholder, Tony had no choice but to bite his lip."

== Track listing ==
1. Not What I Expected (4:00)
2. Deaf (3:54)
