= The Plateau Phase =

- Original 1982 LP sleeve (FBN-12) by Lucien De Roeck, also used for 2012 CD reissue (FBN-12-CD)

Studio album by Crispy Ambulance
- Released: March 1982
- Recorded: 1982
- Genre: Post-punk
- Length: 44:15
- Label: Factory Benelux
- Producers: Crispy Ambulance, Chris Nagle

Crispy Ambulance chronology
The Plateau Phase (1982)	Fin (1985)

Alternative cover
- 1990 CD reissue sleeve (FBN-12-CD), also used for 1999 reissue (LTMCD-2315)

The Plateau Phase is the debut studio album by the English post-punk band Crispy Ambulance, released in March 1982 by Factory Benelux. It was a departure to the sound of the earlier singles which was considered to be closer to the sound of post-punk contemporaries Joy Division. It peaked at No. 21 on the UK Indie Charts by the months of May and April 1982.

== Critical reception ==
Professional ratings
Review scores
Source	Rating
AllMusic	4/5 stars

It received harsh criticism at the time, a typical example being this review by Mat Snow for NME:

This is one of the most pretentious, turgid and tedious LPs I've ever heard. Slavish imitation of Joy Division doth not good music make. All the trade-marks are there -relentless inverted drumming, ominous bass lines, dramatic flanged guitar, bleak synth washes and a lone desperate voice. But whereas Joy Division were sincere and inspired in their depiction of obsession, loss and desolation, Crispy Ambulance are portentous, inane and very, very boring.

Retrospective criticism was more positive, e.g. Ned Raggett, AllMusic:

The Plateau Phase boldly aimed to stand out as an experimental rock album and achieved its goal with style and power. With tips of the hat to everyone from early-'70s Pink Floyd and aggro Krautrock to the later song-smashings of Throbbing Gristle, The Plateau Phase isn't an out-and-out masterpiece, but comes awfully close.

== Original track listing ==
Side one

1. "Are You Ready?" – 5:49
2. "Travel Time" – 3:51
3. "The Force and the Wisdom" – 4:02
4. "The Wind Season" – 5:29
5. "Death from Above" – 3:28

Side two

6. "We Move Through the Plateau Phase" – 5:50
7. "Bardo Plane" – 3:32
8. "Chill" – 4:47
9. "Federation" –3:44
10. "Simon's Ghost" –3:42

== CD reissue ==
The CD, first issued as Comprising : The Plateau Phase, Live On A Hot August Night, Sexus, includes the Live on a Hot August Night single and the "Sexus" A-Side. It was issued on Factory Benelux in 1990 (FBN-12-CD) and LTM in 1999 (LTMCD-2315). The sleeve design is based on the sleeve of Live on a Hot August Night.

It was reissued again on Factory Benelux in 2012 (FBN-12-CD) with the original sleeve and title.

1. "Are You Ready?" – 5:49
2. "Travel Time" – 3:51
3. "The Force and the Wisdom" – 4:02
4. "The Wind Season" – 5:29
5. "Death from Above" – 3:28
6. "We Move Through the Plateau Phase" – 5:50
7. "Bardo Plane" – 3:32
8. "Chill" – 4:47
9. "Federation" – 3:44
10. "Simon's Ghost" – 3:42
11. "The Presence" – 13:03
12. "Concorde Square" – 9:08
13. "Sexus" – 6:11
