= Stockholm Monsters =

English post-punk band of the 1980s

- Origin: Burnage, Manchester, England
- Genres: Post-punk; new wave; synth-pop
- Years active: 1980–1987
- Labels: Factory; Factory Benelux; LTM
- Past members: Tony France; Karl France; Lita Hira; Shan Hira; John Rhodes; Lindsay Anderson; Ged Duffy

Stockholm Monsters were an English post-punk band, formed in Burnage, a suburb of the city of Manchester in 1980. They recorded for Factory Records between 1981 and 1987.

== History ==
The band formed in Manchester in 1980 with a line-up of Tony France (vocals, guitar), Karl France (bass guitar, keyboards), Ged Duffy, and Shan Hira (drums). They were later joined by Lita Hira (keyboards), John Rhodes and trumpeter (and later keyboardist) Lindsay Anderson. The band's debut release was the "Fairy Tales" 7-inch single on Factory Records in September 1981, produced by Martin Hannett, known for his work with Joy Division. The single reached number 43 on the UK Independent Chart.

Two further singles followed before the release of their only studio album, Alma Mater, in 1984. Produced by Peter Hook of New Order, it was described by AllMusic as "a terribly satisfying record that was all but ignored at the time of its release but sounds absolutely prescient in hindsight". Several EPs and singles followed, including "How Corrupt Is Rough Trade?", an attack on Factory's then distributor, which reached number 47 on the UK indie chart, and the Peter Hook-produced "Partyline", before the band broke up in 1987.

In 2002 Noel Gallagher of Oasis revealed that "I started to get into music early on because all the older guys that lived round our way were in a band from Burnage called the Stockholm Monsters. They were the first band ever to come from Burnage and I think they had a hit with a song called Fairy Tales. From that you get into Joy Division, New Order and then it was the Smiths and then the [Stone] Roses and then the [Happy] Mondays - and then you start your own band."

Three CD collections by Stockholm Monsters were released in 2001 by LTM Records. In 2014 a double vinyl edition featuring their singles and the Alma Mater studio album was issued by US label Captured Tracks.

Shan Hira later worked as an audio engineer and record producer and ran Suite 16 studio in Rochdale, formerly Cargo Studios.

== Discography ==
Studio albums

- Alma Mater (1984), Factory

Compilation albums

- The Last One Back (Archive 1980–1987) (2001), LTM
- All at Once (Singles 1981–1987) (2001), LTM

Singles and EPs

- "Fairy Tales" (1981), Factory – UK Indie No. 43
- "Happy Ever After" (1982), Factory
- "Miss Moonlight" (1983), Factory Benelux
- "All at Once" (1984), Factory
- "How Corrupt Is Rough Trade?" (1984), Factory Benelux – UK Indie No. 47
- Greetings Two EP (1987), Materiali Sonori
- "Partyline" (1987), Factory
