= Nyam Nyam (band) =

English post-punk band

- Origin: Kingston upon Hull, England
- Genres: Post-punk
- Years active: 1979–1985, 2012
- Labels: Vital; Factory Benelux; Situation Two; LTM
- Website: http://nyamnyamhopeofheaven.wordpress.com

Nyam Nyam were a post-punk band from Hull, England, who formed in 1979. Their first single was "When We Can’t Make the Laughter Stay" (1981), which brought them to the attention of Peter Hook of New Order, who produced their second single "Fate/Hate" (Factory Benelux, 1984). The band then signed to Beggars Banquet affiliate label Situation Two, who released their sole album Hope of Heaven (1984) as well as a final EP, "The Architect" (1985).

Although critically well-received, the records did not sell in large numbers, and Nyam Nyam were dropped. Singer Paul Trynka would later become a music journalist, editing the magazine Mojo.

The band's record sleeves were designed by Vaughan Oliver of 23 Envelope and 4AD.

The album, with most of their single tracks, was remastered and reissued by LTM Recordings in 2012, with one new 2012 recording, "Doubt".

== Discography ==
- "When We Can't Make Laughter Stay" / "Knowledge" (Chapter II) (Vital 7" VTL-004, 1981)
- "Fate/Hate" / "So Long Ago" / "Fate/Hate" (Dub) (Factory Benelux 12" FBN-28, April 1984)
- Hope Of Heaven (Situation Two LP SITU-10, 1984)
  - "The Illuminated Ones" / "Fate" / "The Meeting" / "This Is The Place" / "You Need More" / "The House" / "Hope Of Heaven" / "And To Hold" / "The Resolution"
- "This Is The Place (demo)" on Abstract #5 compilation LP (Sweatbox AMO-5, 1985)
- "The Architect" / "The Last Place (Hope Of Heaven)" / "Mining Different Seams" / "And To Hold" (Version Two) (Situation Two 12" SIT-37-T, 1985)
- Hope of Heaven + Singles (LTM CD LTMCD-2575, 12 November 2012)
  - "The Illuminated Ones" / "Fate, The Meeting" / "This Is the Place" / "You Need More" / "The House" / "Hope of Heaven" / "And To Hold" / "The Resolution" / "The Architect" / "The Last Place (Hope of Heaven)" / "Mining Different Seams" / "And To Hold" (Version 2) / "Untitled" / "Fate" (FBN 12") / "When We Can't Make Laughter Stay" / "Knowledge" (Chapter II) / "Doubt"
