= Blurt (album) =

Studio album by Blurt
- Released: 1982
- Genre: Post-punk; experimental music; experimental rock
- Label: Red Flame

Blurt chronology
In Berlin (1981)	Blurt (1982)	Bullets For You (1984)

Professional ratings
Review scores
Source	Rating
AllMusic	4/5 stars

Blurt is the debut studio album by English post-punk band Blurt, released in 1982 by Red Flame Records.

It was reissued in 2009 by LTM Recordings as Blurt + Singles.

== Track listing ==
- Lyrics by Ted Milton. Music by Ted Milton, Pete Creese and Jake Milton. Copyright 1982 Blackhill Music.
1. "Dog Save My Sole" 4:37
2. "Trees" 6:49
3. "Physical Fitness" 6:59
4. "Empty Vessels" 3:01
5. "Play the Game" 3:58
6. "The Ruminant Plinth" 5:37
7. "Arthur" 7:08

== Personnel ==
- Ted Milton: Vocals, Saxophone
- Peter Creese: Guitars
- Jake Milton: Drums, Percussion

== Reception ==
Trouser Press described Blurt as "one of the trio's artiest and most orderly works".
