= In Berlin (Blurt album) =

- 1981 Armageddon 12" sleeve

Live album by Blurt
- Released: 1981
- Recorded: 13 December 1980 at the Rock Against Junk concert, Berlin, Germany
- Genre: No wave
- Label: Armageddon (original UK release); Ruby (original US release); Factory Benelux (canceled original release + 2013 European reissue)

Blurt chronology
In Berlin (1981)	Blurt (1982)

Alternative cover
- 2013 Factory Benelux 10" reissue sleeve

Professional ratings
Review scores
Source	Rating
Record Collector	3/5 stars

In Berlin is a live album and the debut release of English post-punk band Blurt. It was recorded live at the Rock Against Junk concert in Berlin, Germany on 13 December 1980, and released the following year, through record label Armageddon. It reached No. 14 on the UK Indie Chart and No. 12 on the US chart.

The album was rereleased as a limited 500-copy edition of 10" plus 7", under the title Live in Berlin, on Factory Benelux (FBN-5) in February 2013.

== Track listing ==
Side A
No.	Title	Length
1.	"Cherry Blossom Polish"	6:17
2.	"My Mother Was a Friend of an Enemy of the People"	5:35
3.	"Puppeteers of the World Unite!"	3:26
4.	"Dyslexia Rules"	2:50

Side B
No.	Title	Length
1.	"Get"	3:22
2.	"Tube Plane"	4:55
3.	"Paranoid Blues"	4:36
4.	"Ubu"	4:52

== Personnel ==
Blurt

- Pete Creese – guitar, trombone
- Jake Milton – vocals, drums
- Ted Milton – vocals, saxophone
