= Alma Mater (Stockholm Monsters album) =

Studio album by Stockholm Monsters
- Released: September 1984
- Genres: Post-punk; new wave; synth-pop
- Length: 32:51
- Label: Factory
- Producer: Peter Hook

Stockholm Monsters chronology
Alma Mater (1984)	The Last One Back (Archive 1980–1987) (2001)

Alma Mater is the sole studio album by the English post-punk band Stockholm Monsters, released in September 1984 by Factory Records. It was produced by Peter Hook of Joy Division and New Order.

== Critical reception ==
Professional ratings
Review scores
Source	Rating
AllMusic	4/5 stars

In a retrospective review for AllMusic, critic Stewart Mason called the album, "a terribly satisfying record that was all but ignored at the time of its release but sounds absolutely prescient in hindsight."

The American indie folk band the Mountain Goats listed the album in their feature "Ten Records That Render Life Bearable" for Pitchfork, calling it the "best album ever".

== Track listing ==
All tracks are written by Stockholm Monsters.

Side one
No.	Title	Length
1.	"Terror"	2:53
2.	"Where I Belong"	2:31
3.	"Decalogue"	5:28
4.	"Winter"	3:08
5.	"Five O'Clock"	2:38

Side two
No.	Title	Length
6.	"Life's Two Faces"	3:25
7.	"Your Uniform"	2:51
8.	"E.W."	3:31
9.	"To Look at Her"	4:47
10.	"Something's Got to Give"	1:37
Total length:		32:51

== Personnel ==
Credits are adapted from the Alma Mater liner notes.

Technical

- Peter Hook – producer
- CJ – engineer
- Mike Johnson – engineer

Artwork

- Trevor Johnson – sleeve design and lettering
