= Kalima (band) =

Mancunian jazz-funk band

Kalima were an English band from Manchester who were active from 1980 to 1991 and in 2001 after a reformation, playing in a funk, Latin and jazz style. They were signed to Factory Records.

== History ==
The band originally formed as the Swamp Children in 1980, with a lineup of Ceri Evans (keyboards and bass), John Kirkham (guitar, formerly of Pink Military), Martin Moscrop (drums), Ann Quigley (vocals), Tony Quigley (sax and bass) and Cliff Saffer (sax). As the Swamp Children, the band released the 12" singles "Little Voices" on Factory in October 1981 and "Taste What's Rhythm" (September 1982) and the album So Hot (October 1982, also released by Factory UK) on Factory Benelux. The album was rated 5 stars in the Virgin Books publication Rock Yearbook 1983 and received a strongly positive review in Melody Maker. The track "Flesh" also appeared on the Crépuscule compilation The Fruit of the Original Sin.

The band changed its name to Kalima in 1983, named after a track by Elvin Jones on his 1978 album Remembrance. That year, the band added Chris Manis (percussion), Andy Connell (piano, keyboards) and Jeremy Kerr (bass, vibes). This meant the band contained all members of A Certain Ratio except Donald Johnson. Tony Quigley also joined A Certain Ratio at the beginning of 1985. Kalima released their first recording, "Fly Away/The Smiling Hour", in January 1984 on Factory. The EP Four Songs followed in October 1985 and the album Night Time Shadows in May 1986.

Having such a large band and sharing most members with A Certain Ratio led to problems coordinating with that band's schedule and US tour. Andy Connell also achieved chart success with Swing Out Sister, in which he ended up leaving both bands after Kalima released the single "Whispered Words" in May 1986. Evans, Kerr and Moscrop soon followed.

The new Kalima released the single "Weird Feelings" in May 1987 with new bassist Martin Hennin. Hennin and Saffer soon left. The band then added Warren Sharples (bass), David Higgins (drums), Andy Boothman (percussion), Matthew Taylor (horns) and Bernard Moss (horns). This lineup recorded the album Kalima! at the end of 1987, released mid-1988. The band moved to London to become part of the acid jazz scene and released the collection, Flyaway in 1989 and recorded their third album, Feeling Fine, at the end of 1989. Feeling Fine was finally released in August 1990 and did not sell well (in the liner notes of the Palatine compilation, Tony Wilson says "Never got the credit. Blame the company.") and the band then became inactive.

Ann Quigley, Tony Quigley and John Kirkham reformed the band as a trio in 2001 and recorded the album In Spirit, released on their own Kin label.

All Swamp Children and Kalima recordings except the last album were reissued by LTM Recordings in 2004 and 2005.

== Discography ==
=== Swamp Children ===
==== Album ====
- So Hot (LP, Factory Benelux FBN-21, October 1982; LP, Factory FACT-70, October 1982)
  - "Samba Zippy (Part One)" (0:53) / "El Figaro" (4:20) / "Tender Game" (5:34) / "Magic" (4:05) / "Sunny Weather" (4:13) // "Samba Zippy (Part Two)" (4:34) / "No Sunshine" (4:20) / "Spark the Flame" (6:15) / "Secret Whispers" (5:05)
  - Factory Benelux and Factory releases in different sleeves
  - 2004 reissue (CD, LTM LTMCD-2364, 2004) extra tracks: "Taste What's Rhythm" (6:00) / "You've Got Me Beat" (4:53) / "Softly Saying Goodbye" (4:09) / "Call Me Honey" (4:52) / "Boy" (4:23) / "Little Voices" (7:18)

==== Singles ====
- "Little Voices" (7:10) // "Call Me Honey" (4:52) / "Boy" (4:21) (12", Factory FAC-49, October 1981)
- "Taste What's Rhythm" (6:00) // "You've Got Me Beat" (4:55) / "Softly Saying Goodbye" (4:08) (12", Factory Benelux FBN-16, September 1982)

==== Compilation appearance ====
- "Flesh" (5:50) on The Fruit of the Original Sin (2×LP, Crépuscule TWI-035, November 1981)

=== Kalima ===
==== Albums ====
- Night Time Shadows (LP, Factory FACT-155, May 1986)
  - "Mystic Rhymes" (5:19) / "After Hours" (4:09) / "Green Dolphin Street" (3:09) / "Black Water" (6:36) / "In Time" (1:03) // "Father Pants" (7:45) / "Start the Melody" (4:25) / "Token Freaky" (3:36) / "Love Suspended in Time" (4:13)
- Night Time Shadows + Singles (CD, LTM LTMCD-2379, 2004)
  - extra tracks: "The Smiling Hour" (4:36) / "Fly Away" (5:39) / "Trickery" (4:27) / "Land of Dreams" (6:48) / "Sparkle" (3:44) / "So Sad" (5:15)
- Kalima! (LP, Factory FACT-206, May 1988)
  - "That Twinkle (In Your Eye)" (4:46) / "Casabel" (3:18) / "Sad and Blue" (4:22) / "Over the Waves" (3:36) / "Now You're Mine" (3:28) // "The Strangest Thing" (4:40) / "Special Way" (3:55) / "Autumn Leaves" (5:01) / "Julan" (5:02)
  - 2004 reissue (CD, LTM LTMCD-2407, 2005) extra tracks: "Weird Feelings" (3:36) / "The Dance" (5:30) / "Rainforest" (5:00) / "Whispered Words" (4:36) / "Sugar and Spice" (5:04) / "In Time (Version)" (1:50)
- Feeling Fine (LP, Factory FACT-249, August 1990)
  - "Shine" (5:58) / "A Thousand Signs" (5:23) / "Take It Easy" (4:05) / "Interstella" (5:03) // "All the Way Through" (6:03) / "Big Fat City" (5:17) / "The Groovy One" (4:48) / "Azure" (1:51) / "Unreal" (4:20)
- Feeling Fine + Singles (CD, LTM LTMCD-2449, 2005)
  - extra tracks: "Shine (Vibrazonic Dub Mix)" (8:59) / "Shine (Concrèt Mix)" (7:12)
- In Spirit (CD, Kin KIN-001, 2001)
  - "Remember" (5:50) / "Send Me" (4:49) / "A Thousand Sighs" (5:24) / "Smitten" (6:16) / "Unreal" (4:25) / "Ready" (7:19) / "Vroom" (5:40) / "Laurie's Song" (4:08) / "Vroom Down" (0:43) / "Firefly" (4:36) / "Shine (Concrete Mix)" (7:11)

==== Singles and EPs ====
- "The Smiling Hour" (4:20) / "Fly Away" (5:13) (12", Factory FAC-87, January 1984)
- Four Songs (12", Factory FAC-127, October 1985)
  - "Trickery" (4:21) / "Land of Dreams" (6:47) // "Sparkle" (3:39) / "So Sad" (4:13)
- "Whispered Words" (4:37) // "Sugar and Spice" (5:07) / "In Time" (1:54) (12", Factory FAC-147, May 1986)
- "Weird Feelings" (3:34) / "The Dance" (5:28) (12", Factory FAC-187, May 1987)
- "Shine (Vibrazonic Dub Mix)" (8:59) / "Shine (Concrèt Mix)" (7:12) (12", Factory FAC-269, July 1990)

==== Compilation ====
- Flyaway (CD, Factory FACD-219, 1989)
  - "Samba Zippy" (4:34) / "Tender Games" (5:34) / "Smiling Hour" (4:20) / "Flyaway" (5:13) / "Trickery" (4:21) / "Land of Dreams" (6:47) / "Sparkle" (3:39) / "Whispered Words" (4:37) / "Sugar and Spice" (5:07) / "Mystic Rhymes" (5:19) / "After Hours" (4:09) / "Start the Melody" (4:25) / "Token Freaky" (3:36) / "Love Suspended" (4:13) / "Weird Feelings" (3:34) / "The Dance" (5:28)
  - first two tracks by the Swamp Children
