= The Wake (UK band) =

Scottish post-punk band

- Origin: Glasgow, Scotland
- Genres: Post-punk; indie pop; synth-pop; indie rock
- Years active: 1982–1994; 2009–present
- Labels: Factory; Factory Benelux; Sarah; LTM
- Members: Gerard McInulty; Carolyn Allen
- Past members: Steven Allen; Joe Donnelly; Bobby Gillespie; Martin Cunning; Alex Macpherson; John Rahim; Matthew Drummond (studio/live performance only); James Moody (studio/live performance only); Duncan Cameron (studio/production only)

The Wake are a British post-punk, synth-pop and later indie pop band, formed in Glasgow in 1981 by Gerard "Caesar" McInulty (formerly of Altered Images), Steven Allen (drums) and Joe Donnelly (bass guitar), the latter replaced by Bobby Gillespie. Steven's sister Carolyn Allen also joined on keyboards, and remained in the band thereafter. Gillespie left the band in 1983, replaced by Martin Cunning and then by Alexander 'Mac' Macpherson.

== History ==
The Wake formed in 1981. The singer-guitarist Caesar, aka Gerard McInulty, had been an original member of Altered Images but quit after they signed to CBS. Other members included drummer Steven Allen, singer-keyboardist Carolyn Allen, and bassist Joe Donnelly. Donelly was quickly replaced by Bobby Gillespie.

The Wake released their first single on their own label Scan Records, coupling together "On Our Honeymoon" and "Give Up". This single eventually caught the attention of New Order manager Rob Gretton, who helped the band sign to Factory Records in 1982 and record an LP (Harmony) at Strawberry Studios in Stockport. This was followed by a number of singles on Factory and its Belgian sister label Factory Benelux.

In 1983, The Wake toured with New Order, and thus received critical attention but were often unfavourably compared to their more celebrated labelmates. Gillespie was asked to leave in 1983, subsequently playing drums with The Jesus and Mary Chain and achieving fame with his own band Primal Scream. After a short-lived stint with McInulty's ex-classmate Martin Cunning on bass, Alexander 'Mac' Macpherson permanently replaced Gillespie. That same year the band recorded a session on John Peel's BBC Radio 1 programme and David 'Kid' Jensen's BBC radio 1 show.

The band toured extensively and scored an indie hit with their 1984 single "Talk About The Past" which featured Vini Reilly of Durutti Column on piano. The recording and release of their seminal 1985 album Here Comes Everybody marked the apex of their career. Macpherson left the band after the release. Instead of replacing him, Caesar recorded the bass parts in the studio and the band hired stand-ins for their rare live gigs.

Further releases were few and far between: one more single "Of The Matter" emerged in 1985 before their last release for Factory, a 4-track EP entitled "Something That No One Else Could Bring" finally appeared in 1987.

In 1988, disillusioned with the lack of proper promotion and indeed apathy from Factory Records, The Wake left the label and signed to Bristol's legendary Sarah Records, releasing two singles and two LPs, the last being 1994's Tidal Wave of Hype. By this point, once again down to a three piece featuring McInulty, Allen and Allen, they also shared personnel with another Glasgow-based band on Sarah, The Orchids, with whom they had also played a few live gigs. Orchids members Matthew Drummond and James Moody joined them for recording and live performances.

In October 1989 the Wake released "Crush the Flowers". This was followed by their third album, Make It Loud, in 1990.

Steven Allen left the band in 1993, leaving McInulty the only founding member. When Sarah shut down in 1995, The Wake effectively dissolved.

== Post-breakup ==
For a few years, McInulty concentrated on other activities outside of recording music – notably writing scripts for plays that featured Allen in an acting role. McInulty and Allen eventually took up writing music again, and after a few tentative demos for possible new material later hooked up with Bobby Wratten (The Field Mice/Northern Picture Library/Trembling Blue Stars) under the name The Occasional Keepers. They released the albums "The Beauty of an Empty Vessel" and "True North" on LTM Recordings, which also incidentally reissued the entire Wake, Field Mice and Orchids back catalogues on remastered CDs containing all the original albums and single/EP cuts collected together.

Alexander Macpherson formed The Cat Club in 1985 and signed to Jive Records. Macpherson now writes and produces music as Daydr34mer.

== Reunions and reissues ==
In autumn 2009, The Wake (McInulty and Carolyn Allen) came together once again to record a new album. On 12 December 2009 the group performed live with other Factory labelmates such as Section 25 and A Certain Ratio, at the Plan K venue in Brussels.

On 28 February 2010, the band performed a 45-minute set at the London Popfest at the Islington venue, the Lexington. They were a last-minute replacement for another band who had dropped out. The set included early tracks such as "Testament", "The Old Men" and "Favour", as well as "O Pamela" and "Here Comes Everybody", from their Factory Records period, plus later Sarah Records recordings. Since then the group have also performed in New York and Paris.

The album of new material, "A Light Far Out", was released in 2012 on LTM Records, containing 7 vocal tracks and 1 instrumental, "Faintness". The group marked Record Store Day in 2013 with a vinyl release of the album on the revived Factory Benelux imprint, and in July 2013 performed at the Indietracks Festival.

Further reissues of their first two Factory albums came in 2013 - with a double vinyl edition of "Harmony" which coupled the original album with the 12" single "Something Outside" plus three radio session tracks. This was released by Factory Benelux. Their second album "Here Comes Everybody" was then reissued in a special commemorative Record Store Day-only format, by US label Captured Tracks, comprising a hardback slipcase containing the original album plus a bonus album of singles and EP tracks that were issued between 1983 and 1987, together with an exclusive pamphlet/lithograph containing a band interview.

Autumn 2014 saw the first ever definitive compilation of The Wake's previously released material, titled "Testament - Best Of" and released by Factory Benelux in vinyl and CD formats. The vinyl format featured a slightly abbreviated track listing to the CD, but also came with a special bonus CD composed wholly of previously unreleased demos and live cuts. The regular CD itself featured 14 tracks culled from various singles and albums, plus one bonus, exclusive new track (an outtake from their 2012 album "A Light Far Out") entitled "Clouds Disco".

This exclusive CD track was then later issued as a 7" vinyl single to mark 2015's Record Store Day.

In late 2015 both Sarah Records albums by The Wake were reissued as remastered CDs, now expanded to include all tracks from the singles Crush the Flowers and Major John.

== Discography ==
Chart placings shown are from the UK Indie Chart.

=== Albums ===
- Harmony (Factory, 1982)
- Here Comes Everybody (Factory, 1985) (No. 20)
- Make It Loud (Sarah, 1990)
- Tidal Wave of Hype (Sarah, 1994)
- Assembly (compilation of a 1984 radio session, a 1983 live set and non-album tracks from the Sarah era, LTM, 2002)
- Holy Heads (compilation of the two Sarah albums, LTM, 2002)
- A Light Far Out (LTM, 2012)
  - limited vinyl edition on Factory Benelux (FBN-64), April 2013
- Harmony (double vinyl reissue - second disc includes 'Something Outside' 12" A+B sides plus session tracks) (Factory Benelux) 2013
- Here Comes Everybody (very limited Record Store Day double vinyl edition - compilation of the album plus 1983–1987 singles/EP tracks in special hardback slipcase packaging with pamphlet and extras) (Captured Tracks) 2013
- Testament – Best Of (compilation of singles and album tracks 1982-2012) (Factory Benelux) 2014

As the Occasional Keepers (in collaboration with Bobby Wratten)

- The Beauty of an Empty Vessel (LTM, 2005)
- True North (LTM, 2008)

=== Singles and EPs ===
- "On Our Honeymoon" (7" SCAN, 1982)
- "Something Outside" / "Host" (12" Factory Benelux, 1983) (No.23)
- "Talk About the Past" (7"/12" Factory, 1984) (No.11)
- "Of the Matter" (7" Factory, 1985) (No.22)
- Something That No One Else Could Bring EP (12" Factory, 1987)
- "Crush the Flowers" / "Carbrain" (7" Sarah, 1989)
- "Major John" / "Lousy Pop Group" (7" Sarah, 1991)
- "Clouds Disco" / "The Sun is a Star" [limited edition Record Store Day release] (7" Factory Benelux, 2015)

== Covers ==
- The covers for the single "Something Outside" and the album Here Comes Everybody were adapted respectively from "Beat the Whites with the Red Wedge" and "Schaumachinerie" (a poster for the opera Victory over the Sun) works by El Lissitzky.
- A cover version of the Wake song "O Pamela" appears on the Nouvelle Vague album, Bande à Part.
- A cover version of the Wake song "Talk About the Past" appears on Blouse & Craft Spells "Gruesome Flowers 2: A Tribute to The Wake" 7" vinyl
