= Ted Milton =

English poet and musician (born 1943)

- Born: 1943 (age 82–83); Bedford, Bedfordshire, England
- Origin: London
- Genres: Art rock
- Occupations: Poet; musician; puppeteer
- Instruments: Vocals; saxophone
- Years active: 1962–present
- Member of: Blurt
- Website: tedmilton.net

Ted Milton (born 1943) is an English poet and musician, best known for leading Blurt, an experimental art rock group.

== Biography ==
Milton grew up in Africa, Canada and Great Britain. He published some early poems in magazines like Paris Review and Brian Patten's Underdog. In 1969, his poetry was published in the anthology Children of Albion: Poetry of the Underground in Britain. In the mid-1960s, he began performing as a puppeteer, participating in numerous international festivals and appearing on So It Goes, the television show hosted by Tony Wilson. Milton contributed a short scene for Terry Gilliam's film Jabberwocky.

Eric Clapton in his autobiography describes often hanging out with Milton in the summer of 1965 at Milton's girlfriend Clarissa's apartment. "Ted was the most extraordinary man. A poet and a visionary ... he was the first person I ever saw physically interpreting music ... to enact it with his entire being, dancing and employing facial expressions to interpret what he was hearing. Watching him, I understood for the first time how you could really live music, how you could listen to it and completely make it come alive, so that it was part of your life. It was a real awakening."

In the late 1970s, Milton began to play alto saxophone and founded the group Blurt. The first single, "My Mother Was a Friend of an Enemy of the People", was soon followed by the live album In Berlin (1981). Since then, Blurt have released more than 20 records. They continue to tour and the new album Beneath Discordant Skies will be out in the autumn of 2015. While living in Brussels in the mid-1990s, Milton started making book-objects with found materials. These were shown at several exhibitions and have been taken up in the Bibliothèque Nationale in Paris, as well as in the British Library.

Milton also makes art objects and installations, having had shows at Nadine in Brussels and at the bookstore Tropisme, also in Brussels,

In 2001, Milton staged an homage to the Russian author of the absurd Daniil Kharms, "In Kharm's Way", a mixture of music, puppeteering and spoken word, with the electronic musician Sam Britton. In 2007, Milton collaborated again with Sam Britton in the "ODES" project; an overview of 25 years solo work outside Blurt. Also Milton has recently completed "Elegiac" – a collaboration with Graham Lewis from the band Wire and Sam Britton (Icarus).

The Milton Text Book, a selection of Milton's lyrics, has been published and funded through Kickstarter.

Milton now lives in Deptford, south-east London.

== Bibliography ==
- Mungo (publ.: Jovane - 1963)
- LOVE, LOVE, LOVE: The New Love Poetry (including 4 poems by Ted Milton, edited by Pete Roche; London: Corgi Books, 1967)
- Children of Albion: Poetry of the Underground in Britain (Penguin, 1969)
- The Old Pals' Act (editor; London: Allison & Busby, ISBN 0-85031-016-4, 1972)
- He Also Serves Who Only Incubates (self-published 1977)
- Longes de Louanges (Tak Tak Tak, 1988)
- Pagan Strings vol.1 (self-published, 1990. Book-object with found materials)
- Pagan Strings vol.2 (self-published, 1990. Book-object with found materials)
- Pagan Strings vol.3 (self-published, 1991. Book-object with found materials)
- Pagan Strings vol.4 (self-published, 1991. Book-object with found materials)
- Treize - Pagan Strings vol. 13 (self-published, 1993. Book-object with found materials)
- Odes (Brussels: Nadine, 2007. Book with CD and 7" vinyl)

== Discography ==
=== with Blurt ===
see Blurt#Discography

=== Solo/releases credited to Ted Milton ===
==== Albums ====
- Love is Like a Violence (1993), Embryo
- Magic Moments (1994), Bahia - Ted Milton & the Blurt Big Band
- Nogales (1995), T.M. - Ted Milton & The Back to Normal Orchestra
- Sublime (2000), Charhizma - Ted Milton & Loopspool

==== Singles ====
- "Confessions of an aeroplane farter / I don( want to go poo-poo!" (1979), Echt! - Ted Milton and Mr. Pugh's puppet theatre
- "Ode: O to be Seen Through Your Eyes" (1985), Toeblock
- "Postcard" (1994), T.M. - Ted Milton & Bobonus Beats
- "The Inflatable Hedge" (1994), T.M. - Ted Milton & Goz of Kermeur
- "O Pity Us" (1999), House Musik - Ted Milton, Andreas Gerth, and Paddy Steer
- Ted Milton Meets Goz Of Kermeur - Inflated Edge - digital reissue (2013) (Atypeek Music) - (Noise Product)
