= The Passengers (band) =

Belgian post-punk/new wave band

- Also known as: The Names
- Origin: Brussels, Belgium
- Genres: Post-punk, new wave
- Years active: 1977–1979
- Past members: Michel Sordinia; Isabelle Hanrez; Marc Deprez; Robert Franckson; Christophe Den Tandt

The Passengers were a 1970s Brussels post-punk/new wave band that later became better known as The Names. The original lineup included Michel Sordinia (bass, vocals), Isabelle Hanrez (vocals), Marc Deprez (guitar), Robert Franckson (guitar) and Christophe Den Tandt (drums).

== Formation ==
The band formed in late 1977 and played their first gig in February 1978, performing a pop-oriented brand of post-punk. Musical influences at the time included the Velvet Underground, Richard Hell, Blondie and Television.

In March 1978, they won a punk contest and turned down the first prize. They were slated to record a single ("Danger Zone"/"Hole in Your Mind") with local punk/new wave label Romantik Records, but the effort never materialized.

== Lineup and name change ==
In mid-1978, Hanrez and Franckson left the band. By late 1978, The Passengers, now influenced by Magazine and XTC, shifted to a new lineup including Den Tandt on keyboards. By mid-1979, the band changed names to become The Names.

== Members ==
- Michel Sordinia (bass, vocals)
- Isabelle Hanrez (vocals)
- Marc Deprez (guitar)
- Robert Franckson (guitar)
- Christophe Den Tandt (drums, keyboards)
