= Alma Mater (Pope Benedict XVI album) =

Studio album by Pope Benedict XVI
- Released: 29 November 2009
- Genre: Christmas
- Label: Geffen

Alma Mater is a Christmas album by Pope Benedict XVI, released on 29 November 2009 by Geffen Records.

== Track listing ==
All tracks are written by Pope Benedict XVI.

No.	Title	Length
1.	"Sancta Dei Genitrix"	6:41
2.	"Mater Ecclesiae"	5:24
3.	"Advocata Nostra"	5:43
4.	"Benedicta Tu"	6:42
5.	"Causa Nostrae Laetitiae"	6:35
6.	"Auxilium Christianorum"	4:06
7.	"Regina Coeli"	6:54
8.	"Magistra Nostra"	7:45
Total length:		49 minutes
