= Stanton Miranda =

American drummer

Miranda Stanton, best known for her recordings as Stanton Miranda, Miranda Dali and Thick Pigeon, is a 1980s Factory Records artist from New York City. She achieved some notice for her single "Wheels Over Indian Trails" (produced by Stephen Morris and Gillian Gilbert from New Order) and her later cover of "Love Will Tear Us Apart" by Joy Division. She also guested on recordings by the Durutti Column. Her first band was CKM in New York with Kim Gordon of Sonic Youth, where she played drums.

She had a brief acting career, appearing in the Jonathan Demme films, Something Wild, Married to the Mob and Silence of the Lambs. She also played the lead role in the little known art-house film Souvenir (1996), which was directed by Michael H. Shamberg.

She continues to work on small scale musical projects. Working as blythe dahl she has released instrumental tracks online which are available for license through Pump Audio/Getty Images. She also participated in the web collaboration "Empty Rooms with Casual Sounds."

== Discography ==
=== Thick Pigeon ===
- Subway / Sedan (7") (Crépuscule TWI-038, Jan 1982)
- Tracy & Pansy / Dog (7") (Crépuscule TWI-108, Nov 1982)
- "Jingle Bell Rock" (on shared 7" with The French Impressionists and Monks In The Snow) (7") (Operation Twilight OPT-020, December 1982)
- Too Crazy Cowboys (LP) (Factory FACT-85, Sep 1984)
  - Troglodytes / Sudan / Crime / Help / Fred + Andy // Misuse / Nuns + Soldiers / DB / Babcock + Wilcox / Jess + Bart / Hank
  - rereleased LTM 2004 as Thick Pigeon/Miranda Dali, with Miranda Dali 1991 CD included
- Xmas Greetings For 1986: "Blue Christmas" (cassette) (Factory FAC-175, Dec 1986)
  - Sent out by Factory as the label's Christmas card.

=== Stanton Miranda ===
==== Singles ====
- Wheels Over Indian Trails (7", 12") (Factory Benelux FBN-44, 1986)
- She's Lost Control / Love Will Tear Us Apart (7", CDS) (Hut Recordings 1995)
  - "She's Lost Control" by Girls Against Boys

==== Compilation appearances ====
- "Working Youth" - Just Another Asshole (LP) (Just Another Asshole, 1981)
- "Caught", "Dream Back" - Pinpoints On A Nation (C60 cassette) (Fifth Column, 1984)
- "Subway" - Crépuscule Collection 2: State Of Excitement (LP) (Les Disques Du Crépuscule, 1986)
- Psycho III (Music From The Motion Picture) (LP) (MCA Records 1986)
- "Wheels Over Indian Trails" - Crépuscule Collection 4: Death Leaves An Echo (LP) (Les Disques Du Crépuscule, 1987)
- "Subway" Au Fur Et À Mesure ... (Crépuscule: 10 Years?) (CD) (Les Disques Du Crépuscule, 1990)
- "Paradise Passage Road" - Dry by Durutti Column, (LP, CD) (Materiali Sonori, 1992)
- "Pope" - Young Popular And Sexy (LP) (Factory US FACTUS-17/Factory Australasia, 1987)
  - credited on label as "STANTON-MIRANDA aka THICK PIGEON"
- "Love Will Tear Us Apart" - A Means To An End: The Music Of Joy Division (CD) (Hut Recordings, 1995)

==== Video releases ====
- "Wheels Over Indian Trails" - Four + One (VHS, NTSC compilation) (Factory US)
- "Wheels Over Indian Trails" - Umbrellas In The Sun: A Crépuscule/Factory Benelux DVD 1979-1987 (DVD, NTSC) (Les Temps Modernes, 2005)

=== Miranda Dali ===
- Miranda Dali (CD) (Les Disques Du Crépuscule TWI-938-2, 1991)
  - Riding (3:19) / Amerika (3:41) / One (1:57) / Breathe (3:47) / Bird (2:00) / Gerty (3:32) / L.D. (3:39) / Angels (4:54) / Wrong (3:00) / St. G. (5:04)
  - rereleased LTM 2004 as Thick Pigeon/Miranda Dali
- Lo How (3:25) / Blue (2:27) / Happy Christmas (3:40) (CDS) (Darla.com, 2004)
  - limited offer for darla.com customers in late 2004
