= Isabelle Antena =

French singer and songwriter

Isabelle Antena (born 28 May 1960) is a French singer and songwriter, and founder of the electro-samba group Antena.

== Biography ==
Isabelle Antena is a bossa nova and samba-inflected nu jazz and electropop artist. She was a founding member of 1980s French-Belgian synthpop trio Antena, and in the 1990s led another group, the Powaga Sisters, and was with them for three albums between 1993–2004. Alongside these projects she maintained a solo music career, selling over a million albums. As a solo artist Isabelle Antena has found particular success in Japan and the Far East.

Originally Antena were a trio, combining minimal electro, pop and samba styles. In the summer of 1984 Antena signed a deal with Phonogram, who took a shot at the UK singles chart with "Be Pop". At the same time Isabelle moved to London. The second single, "Life Is Too Short", came out in November, but did not bring mainstream success and so Isabelle returned to Les Disques du Crepuscule and a solo career. Her new single, "Seaside Week End", came out at the beginning of 1986, which was then followed by the album En Cavale. Released early the following year, Hoping for Love combined Latin, funk and samba palette and included jazz and acoustic stylings.

Hoping For Love took Isabelle to Japan for the first time, where in 1987 she was voted best international female singer at the prestigious Tokyo Music Festival. She subsequently performed at the Tokyo Dome between spots by Earth, Wind & Fire and Kool & the Gang. Isabelle then released her third solo album On a Warm Summer Night. In Europe this was released as Tous Mes Caprices, and promoted with a Belgian tour supporting Vaya Con Dios, whose bass player Dirk Schoufs would go on to collaborate with Isabelle as a writer and musician, and become her second husband. Isabelle went on to write and record De l'Amour et des Hommes (1988) and Jouez le Cinq (1989) - the latter being re-issued only months later as Intemporelle (1990) - performing live across Europe as well as North America and Japan. Dirk Schoufs left Vaya Con Dios to join Isabelle, bringing with him Vaya drummer Marco De Meersman and Fritz Sundermann, jazz guitarist and son of Freddy Sunder.

This quartet helped her with the next album, Les Derniers Guerriers Romantique, a conceptual work released in April 1991. On 24 May, 1991, when Dirk Schoufs died, Isabelle was devastated. Following a year of reflection, she returned to the studio in 1992 to record a new album called Carpe Diem, released in Japan and France in November. Recorded by Gilles Martin with colleagues including Marco De Meersman and Sundermann in the comfort of Studio Caraibes in Brussels, Isabelle produced the album herself.

Since Carpe Diem, Isabelle has released a further ten albums, spanning jazz, funk, Latin and house styles, as well as writing for and producing for other artists. She has collaborated with Fragile on the Rocks, The Powaga Sisters and the jazz project Pause Cafe. Although as a solo artist Isabelle Antena has often found greater commercial success in Japan and the Far East than in Europe, she remains critically acclaimed in Europe and the United States.

In 1996 the track "Antena" opened the first ESL compilation by Thievery Corporation, and since then Isabelle has worked with many current DJs and producers including Buscemi, Nicola Conte, Ursula 1000 and Yukihiro Fukutomi. Along with Thievery Corporation, all of them contributed to her 2005 bossa mix double album, Easy Does It / Issy Does It (Remixes), and Thievery guested again on the 2006 Antena project Toujours du Soleil. Completing the Antena trilogy, Bossa Super Nova was issued in April 2010.

== Discography ==
Albums

- Camino del Sol (1982 – debut mini-album, recorded as Antena), Les Disques Du Crepuscule
- En Cavale (1986 – full-length debut-album produced by Martin Hayles), Les Disques Du Crepuscule
- Hoping for Love (1987), Les Disques Du Crepuscule
- Tous Mes Caprices (aka On a Warm Summer Night) (1988), Les Disques Du Crepuscule
- De l'amour et des Hommes (1988 – mini-album of cover versions), Les Disques Du Crepuscule
- Jouez le Cinq (1989), Les Disques Du Crepuscule
- Fire (1989), Les Disques Du Crepuscule
- Intemporelle (1990 – basically, a repackaged version of Jouez Le Cinq with re-ordered track-listing and two different songs, CD only), Les Disques Du Crepuscule
- Les Derniers Guerriers Romantiques (1991), Les Disques Du Crepuscule
- Carpe Diem (1992), issued in France and Japan via Delabel/Victor
- More Acid Than Jazz (1992), issued in Japan via Victor
- A La Belle Etoile (1995), Harlem Moon
- Mediterranean Songs (1997)
- De L'Amour Et Des Hommes – Volume 2 (1999)
- Take Me To Paradise (2001), Les Disques Du Crepuscule
- L'Alphabet Du Plaisir – Best Of (1982–2005) (2005 – compilation), LTM Recordings
- Easy Does It (2005), LTM Recordings
- Issy Ioes It (2005, on vinyl only – CD version included with initial CDs of Easy Does It), LTM Recordings
- French Riviera (2006)
- Toujours du soleil (2006), LTM Recordings
- Bossa Super Nova (2010), LTM Recordings

Singles

- The Boy From Ipanema (1982 – EP, lead track recorded with John Foxx), Les Disques Du Crepuscule
- Seaside Weekend (1985), Les Disques Du Crepuscule
- Easy Street (1986 – cover of the Sister Sledge song written by Nile Rodgers and Bernard Edwards), Les Disques Du Crepuscule
- Sois Pop (Be Pop) (1986 – various versions), Island Records and New Dance
- Laying on the Sofa (1987), Les Disques Du Crepuscule
- Le Poisson Des Mers Du Sud (1988), Les Disques Du Crepuscule
- Romancia Del Amor (1988), Les Disques Du Crepuscule
- Une Journée Banale À New York City (1988), Les Disques Du Crepuscule
- Tous Mes Caprices (1988 – issued in Spain)
- Domine-Toi (1989), Les Disques Du Crepuscule
- I Love You Mr Hyde (1990), Les Disques Du Crepuscule
- Sur Ton Ile (1991), Les Disques Du Crepuscule
- Corto Prend Le Large (1992)
- Love Is To Blame (2006), LTM Recordings
