= James Hayward (writer) =

- Born: James Nice; 6 January 1966 (age 60); Essex, England
- Occupation: Writer
- Writing career
- Pen name: James Hayward
- Subjects: World Wars I and II, recent art and music history
- Website: www.facebook.com/pages/James-Hayward/503094143035681?fref=ts

James Hayward is the pen name of James Nice (born 6 January 1966 in Essex), an English writer on military, modern art and post-punk musical history.

== Biography ==
Nice was educated at the University of Glasgow prior to working in music publishing at Les Disques du Crepuscule, and then as a solicitor.

Books under the name James Hayward include The Bodies on the Beach (2001), Shingle Street (2002), Myths and Legends of the First World War (2002), Myths and Legends of the Second World War (2003) and Double Agent Snow – The True Story of Arthur Owens, Hitler's Chief Spy in England (2013).

As James Hayward, he has also written liner notes for several audiobook CDs including Artists' Rifles 1914–18, Memorial Tablet (Siegfried Sassoon), Oh! It's a Lovely War (4 volumes), British War Broadcasting 1938–1946, RAF Bomber Command at War (2 volumes), The Battle of Britain, D-Day and the Battle for Normandy, Futurism & Dada Reviewed, Voices of Dada, Surrealism Reviewed, Musica Futurista, Cocteau Satie & Les Six, Bauhaus Reviewed, Wyndham Lewis: The Enemy Speaks, Futurlieder and A Young Person's Guide to the Avant-Garde.

As James Nice, he made the 2006 documentary film Shadowplayers, a history of the Factory Records label, and wrote the 2010 book Shadowplayers: The Rise and Fall of Factory Records. He runs the record labels LTM Recordings, Factory Benelux and Les Disques du Crépuscule.

== Publications ==
=== As James Hayward ===
- —— (2001). The Bodies on the Beach. CD41 Publishing. ISBN 978-0954054915.
- —— (2002). Shingle Street. CD41 Publishing. ISBN 978-0954054915.
- —— (2002). Myths and Legends of the First World War. Sutton Publishing Ltd. ISBN 978-0750928656.
- —— (2003). Myths and Legends of the Second World War. Sutton Publishing Ltd. ISBN 978-0750930475.
- —— (2013). Double Agent Snow. Simon & Schuster. ISBN 978-0857208545.

=== As James Nice ===
- —— (2010). Shadowplayers – The Rise and Fall of Factory Records. Aurum Press Ltd. ISBN 978-1845135409.
