= Stubnitz (ship) =

Former East German refrigerated fishing vessel now used as a cultural events ship

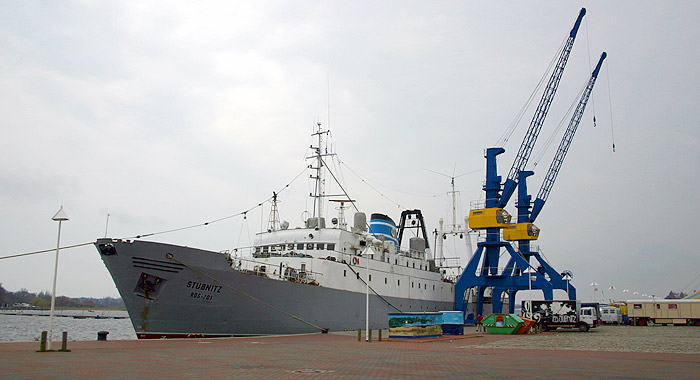

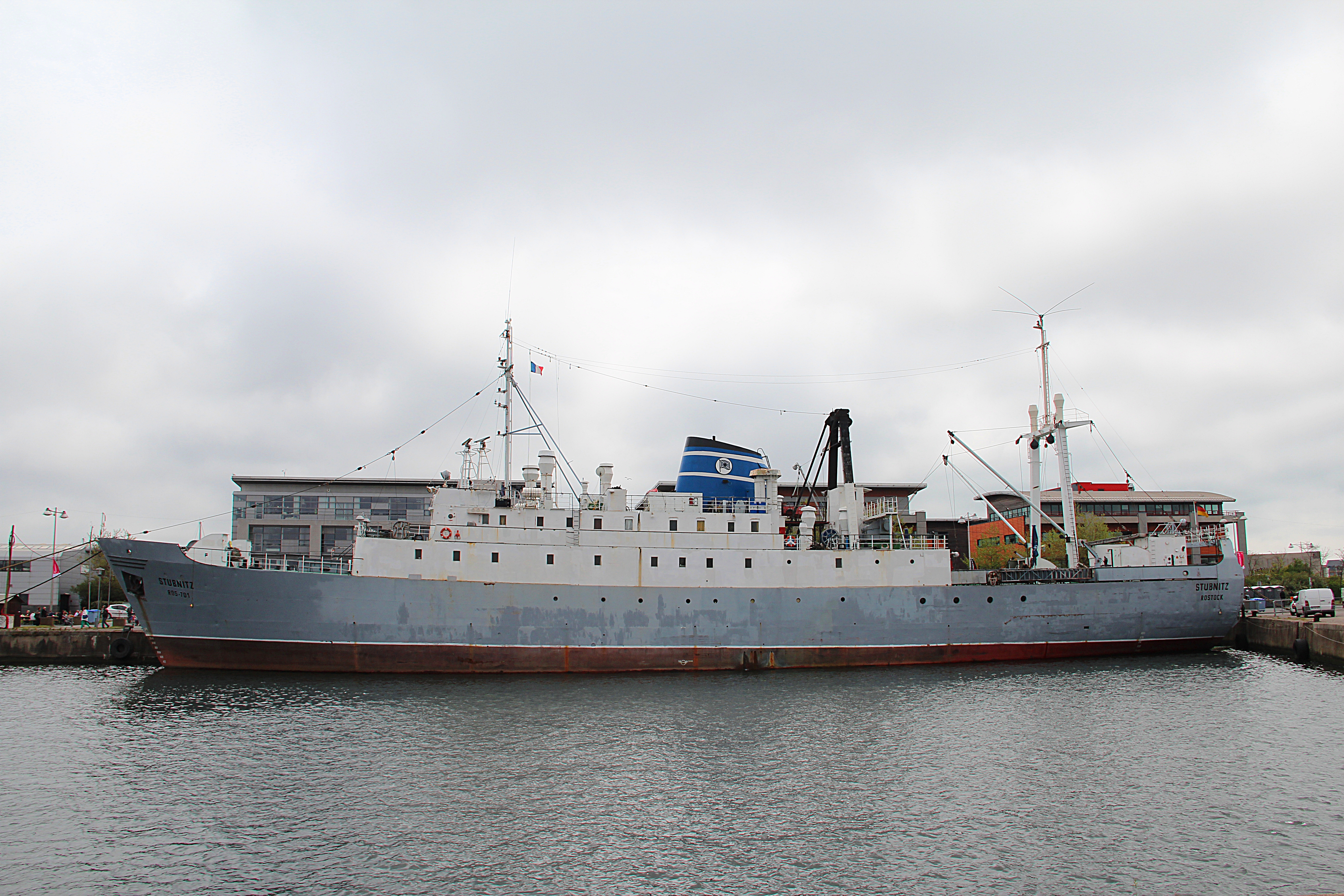
The Stubnitz in Dunkirk (2013)

The Stubnitz is a former refrigerated ship of the GDR deep-sea fishing fleet, which has been used as a socio-cultural event location since 1992. It has been moored in Hamburg since 2013.

== The ship and its history ==
With the KTS Stubnitz (SAS 501) and the KTS Granitz (SAS 502), VEB Fischfang Saßnitz opened the flotilla fishery for herring in 1965, which was typical for this decade. The two sister ships were modified versions of the Tropik, which was mass-produced for export by the Volkswerft Stralsund shipyard. Both ships had 59 crew members, a freezing capacity of up to 60 tons per day and a refrigerated hold volume of 1863 m^{3}. From 1984 to 1992, the ships were in service as ROS 701 and ROS 702 for VEB Fischfang Rostock.

The motor vessel Stubnitz is a largely original vessel from the GDR's deep-sea fishing fleet, but key areas of the ship had to be structurally modified for later use. The electromechanical machinery and its DC technology, the bridge with radio and chart room, the living and social areas such as the cabins, galley, mess room and the hospital are mostly original. The processing equipment was dismantled from the former processing deck and the former refrigerated cargo holds. The exterior of the ship was not changed after the last fishing operation.

In 2003, the ship was entered in the list of monuments of the Hanseatic city of Rostock as a document of deep-sea fishing in the former GDR.

== Change of use after reunification ==
Urs Blaser, one of the co-initiators, reported that after the currency reform in 1990, the former GDR shipping industry also collapsed and 40 to 50 ships lay unused on the quayside in Rostock. Since 1992, the ship has been transformed into a mobile platform for music, cultural events, documentation and communication. Three former cargo holds are regularly used as event spaces for live music, exhibitions, performances and installations. Artists and staff can be accommodated and catered for on board. The ship is used for projects in European port cities. In 1992, the Stubnitz Kunst-Raum-Schiff GmbH, an artists' initiative from Germany, Switzerland and Austria, acquired the fishing vessel from the Rostock fishing shipping company. From 1993, the project was supported by employment and state funding. In 1994, after initial cultural successes in St. Petersburg, Malmö and Hamburg, the initiative failed due to financial burdens from conversion, change of ship status and ship operation.

The non-profit association Motorschiff Stubnitz e.V. was founded in 1995 and has operated the ship ever since. In 1997 the admission for public events in Rostock was gradually increased from 150 to 450 people, with the installation of escape routes. In 1998, the Rostocker Kulturschiff Stubnitz e. V. was registered as the ship's owner.

In addition to maintaining the ship and developing the center of cultural productivity, the work of the two associations focused on organizing cultural events with contemporary art and cultural projects in Rostock. With over 100 events and 200 project presentations each year, 20,000 to 30,000 visitors were reached. Since 1998, activities in the radio and media sector have come to the fore.

Concerts and performances with artists, bands and projects from all over the world have been taking place on the Stubnitz since the 1990s. Many were recorded on audio and video and stored in a media archive in the belly of the ship. This archive will one day be made accessible to the public. Until then, there will be small insights from each year on the homepage.

The ship maintenance work and the cultural work are largely carried out by volunteers, supported by companies and private individuals and with project funding from the Hanseatic City of Rostock, the state of Mecklenburg-Vorpommern and the Rostock employment office.

A port safety regulation in Mecklenburg-Vorpommern prevented the Stubnitz from docking in Rostock's city harbor, from October 2008. In April 2010, after calling at ports in Aalborg, Amsterdam and Copenhagen, she moored again in the city port of Rostock.

Since 2013, the ship has been moored in Hamburg's HafenCity at Baakenhöft, where it has been used as a venue for concerts, clubbing, conferences and as a platform for special events.

From 2019 to 2021, major repairs were carried out with the help of monument funding from the federal government and the Free and Hanseatic City of Hamburg. Further maintenance measures with the aim of class renewal in 2024 will be implemented with funding from the federal government's Special Monument Protection Program XII and the Hamburg 2030 Redevelopment Fund.

Since 2022, the project has faced complaints about noise and had to look for a new berth. A new perspective emerges in February 2023. The Stubnitz has been moored at Hamburg's Elbbrücken since September 26, 2023.

== Voyages as a cultural ship ==
In 1998, the ship was reactivated with a temporary sailing permit for a project in Stockholm, the European Capital of Culture. After completing her class renewal in 2000, the Stubnitz received her regular license to sail as a cargo ship on international voyages. The class confirmation in 2009 preserved the Stubnitz's radius of action.

Since then, the Stubnitz has been on outposts in the North and Baltic Sea region, with the event programs being developed and implemented together with regional partners: Rostock (1992–2011), Hamburg (2000, 2001, 2003, 2005, 2006, 2007, 2008, 2010, 2011, 2012, 2013–2023), Europäische Kulturhauptstadt Rotterdam (2001, 2005), Amsterdam (2002, 2005, 2006, 2007, 2008), Brügge (2002), Stettin (2003), Riga (2004), Klaipeda (2004) Kopenhagen (2005, 2006, 2008, 2009, 2010), Newcastle (2006), Dünkirchen (2005, 2013) sowie Nykøbing Falster (2008), Aalborg (2009), Aarhus (2010), Bremen (2012), Wilhelmshaven (2009, 2012), London (2012).

In 2002, the merits of the innovative cultural and youth work on the Stubnitz were honored with the Culture Prize of the Hanseatic City of Rostock. In 2013, the MS Stubnitz received the German Venue Award. For the years 2016, 2017 and 2021, the Stubnitz was awarded the Applaus Music Prize - an award for the program planning of independent venues of the Initiative Musik - for culturally outstanding live music programs.
