= Crispy Ambulance =

English post-punk band, formed late-1977

- Also known as: Ram Ram Kino
- Origin: Manchester, England
- Genres: Post-punk, indie rock
- Years active: 1977–1982; 1999–2008; 2014–2019
- Labels: Factory; LTM; Darla; C.A. Tapes; Aural Assault
- Members: Keith Darbyshire; Robert Davenport; Alan Hempsall; Gary Madeley
- Website: crispyambulance.com

Crispy Ambulance are an English post-punk band, formed in Manchester in late-1977 by Keith Darbyshire (bass), Robert Davenport (guitar), Alan Hempsall (vocals), and Gary Madeley (drums). They had been inspired by the Sex Pistols' second gig in the Lesser Free Trade Hall, in addition to the bands Magazine and Hawkwind.

== Career ==
The band played their first gig on 1 January 1978 at the Spurley Hey Youth Centre. Following a self-released debut single, "From the Cradle to the Grave" (1980), the band joined Factory Records. Singles "Unsightly and Serene" and "Live on a Hot August Night" (produced by Martin Hannett) preceded their album The Plateau Phase (1982) and final single "Sexus". The Plateau Phase was given a five star review by Sounds.

In April 1980 singer Alan Hempsall also appeared on stage with Joy Division at Derby Hall, standing in for Ian Curtis who was recovering from a suicide attempt the previous day, a performance which ultimately descended into a riot. This scene is depicted in the Joy Division biopic Control. During 1981–1982, Crispy Ambulance played several dozen live dates in the UK, as well as a short European tour with Section 25. They also recorded a session for John Peel's BBC Radio 1 show in January 1981.

Crispy Ambulance disbanded in late 1982, leaving behind Fin (1985), a live album of late period songs. A further posthumous album, Frozen Blood, included their 1981 BBC radio session for the John Peel programme. The four members carried on for a short time as Ram Ram Kino, releasing one single "Advantage" on Temple Records.

The original line-up of Crispy Ambulance reformed in 1999, and went on to release two studio albums, Scissorgun in 2002 and The Powder Blind Dream in 2004, as well as a live album, Accessory After the Fact. All these later recordings were produced by Graham Massey of 808 State. The group also undertook a short tour of North America in November 2002. They reformed again in 2014 and are back touring.

Crispy Ambulance released an almost entirely instrumental album in 2016, entitled Random Textures. The double CD edition, released by Factory Benelux, came with an expanded version of the Record Store Day album Compulsion.

== Influence ==
The Half Man Half Biscuit song "Running Order Squabble Fest" (on the album This Leaden Pall) references the band with the line: "You're going on after Crispy Ambulance!". It is a play on the football chant "You're going home in a St John Ambulance!".

== Discography ==
=== Studio albums ===
- The Plateau Phase (1982), Factory Benelux FBN-12 – UK Indie No. 23
  - Expanded CD reissue as Comprising : The Plateau Phase, Live on a Hot August Night, Sexus
- Scissorgun (2002), LTM
- The Powder Blind Dream (2004), LTM
- Compulsion (2015) Factory Benelux Record Store Day release
- Random Textures (2016) Factory Benelux (double CD with Compulsion expanded

=== Compilations ===
- The Blue & Yellow (of the Yacht Club) (1983), C.A. Tapes
- Frozen Blood (2000), LTM

=== Live albums ===
- Open, Gates of Fire (1983), C.A. Tapes
- Fin (1985), LTM
- Accessory After the Fact (1999), LTM

=== Singles ===
- "From the Cradle to the Grave" (1980), Aural Assault
- "Unsightly and Serene" (1981), Factory, FAC.32 – UK Indie No. 27
- "Live on a Hot August Night" (1981), Factory Benelux, FACBN 4
- "Sexus" (1984), Factory Benelux

=== Ram Ram Kino ===
- Advantage – Tantric Routines EP (1985), Temple
