= Annik Honoré =

Belgian journalist and music promoter (1957–2014)

- Born: 12 October 1957; Mons, Belgium
- Died: 3 July 2014 (aged 56)
- Occupations: Journalist, music promoter

Annik Honoré (12 October 1957 – 3 July 2014) was a Belgian journalist and music promoter best known for her association with Ian Curtis, the former lead singer and lyricist of Joy Division. She co-founded record labels Les Disques du Crépuscule and Factory Benelux.

== Early life ==
Honoré was born in Mons, Belgium on 12 October 1957. As a teenager she became interested in rock music, attending various concerts in London as well as other locations. She moved to London in 1979, taking a job as a secretary at the Belgian Embassy.

In late 1979, Honoré and journalist Michel Duval began promoting musical events at the Raffinerie du Plan K venue in Brussels. Joy Division, and Cabaret Voltaire performed on the club's opening night on 16 October. A few months later, in 1980, Honoré and Duval founded Factory Benelux as a Continental offshoot of Factory Records as well as Les Disques du Crépuscule, an independent Belgian music label. Honoré chose the name "Crépuscule."

In the summer of 1984, she was the tour manager of Front 242 during their American tour.

== Relationship with Ian Curtis ==
According to Honoré, in a 2010 interview, her relationship with Ian Curtis, which ended with his death in 1980, was platonic. Curtis' widow, Deborah Curtis, has characterised the relationship, which she claims began in August 1979, as an "affair".

In Control, the Ian Curtis biographical film directed by Anton Corbijn in 2007, Honoré was played by Alexandra Maria Lara. Ian Curtis was played by actor Sam Riley, Lara's husband.

== Later life ==
Honoré left the music business in 1985. From 1986 she worked as a civil servant, specifically as a secretary in the Research and Innovation department of the European Commission in Brussels. She had two children, Bertrand and Sasha. She died of cancer on 3 July 2014.
