= LTM Recordings =

British record label

- Founded: 1983
- Founder: James Nice
- Genre: Post-punk
- Country of origin: United Kingdom
- Location: Norfolk
- Official website: https://ltmrecordings.com/

LTM Recordings (originally les temps modernes) is a British independent record label founded in 1983, and best known for reissues of artists and music from 1978 to the present day, as well as modern classical and avant-garde composition. The label is based in Norfolk, England, and is curated by James Nice.

Particularly notable are reissues of catalogue originally released by Factory Records, Les Disques du Crépuscule, Compact Organisation and Sarah Records. Nice has also reactivated the Factory Benelux and Crépuscule labels, for reissues and new releases.

LTM has also released audiobooks with archive recordings by major figures in 20th Century avant-garde art, including Futurism & Dada Reviewed, Voices of Dada, Surrealism Reviewed, Musica Futurista: The Art of Noises, Bauhaus Reviewed and Cocteau Satie and Les Six.

== History ==
James Nice started LTM as a cassette label, 'Les Temps Modernes', which became a record label proper in 1984. LTM went into hibernation when he relocated to Brussels to join Crépuscule, where he worked on new releases as well as reissues of Crépuscule and Factory Benelux catalogue, and ran his own sublabel, Interior. After several years at Crépuscule and PIAS he revived LTM, and also worked as a lawyer (including representing some Factory artists against London Records in the mid-1990s).

Nice is also the author of Shadowplayers: The Rise and Fall of Factory Records (2010), and the earlier documentary Shadowplayers on the same subject (2006).

== Artists on the LTM label ==
- Antena
- Aberdeen
- A Certain Ratio
- Isabelle Antena
- Blurt
- Blue Orchids
- Biting Tongues
- William S. Burroughs
- Steven Brown
- Berntholer
- Crawling Chaos
- Cath Carroll
- Celletti Alessandra
- Crispy Ambulance
- Anna Domino
- Diagram Brothers
- Dislocation Dance
- Department S
- Devine & Statton
- French Impressionists
- Foreign Press
- The Field Mice
- Gnac
- Gina X Performance
- Gilbert & Lewis
- Paul Haig
- Hermine
- Isolation Ward
- Richard Jobson
- Josef K
- Kalima
- Kid Montana
- Ludus
- Virna Lindt
- Lowlife
- Minimal man
- Minny Pops
- Miaow
- Marine
- The Names
- Northside
- Northern Picture Library
- The Occasional Keepers
- The Orchids
- The Other Two
- The Passage
- Peter Principle
- Quando Quango
- Blaine L. Reininger
- The Room
- Revenge
- Eric Random
- The Royal Family and the Poor
- Erik Satie
- Savage Republic
- Severed Heads
- Alison Statton & Spike
- Stockholm Monsters
- Section 25
- 23 Skidoo
- Thick Pigeon
- Winston Tong
- Tuxedomoon
- Trembling Blue Stars
- Tunnelvision
- Ultramarine
- The Wake
- Wyndham Lewis
- X-O-Dus

== See also ==
- Factory Benelux/Les Disques du Crépuscule
- List of record labels
