= Les Disques du Crépuscule =

Les Disques du Crépuscule Factory Benelux
Current Crépuscule logo

Current Factory Benelux logo
- Founded: 1980
- Founder: Michel Duval; Annik Honoré
- Genre: Pop; experimental; post-punk
- Country of origin: Belgium
- Location: Brussels (Belgium), Paris (France), Norfolk (UK)
- Official website: lesdisquesducrepuscule.com factorybenelux.com

Les Disques du Crépuscule is an independent record label founded in Belgium in 1980 by Michel Duval and Annik Honoré. It also had a prominent associated sublabel, Factory Benelux. Both are now run by former employee James Nice.

"Crépuscule" translates as "twilight", with most of the label's catalogue numbers prefixed by the letters TWI.

== History ==
Duval and Honoré had previously organised and promoted concerts in Brussels at the Plan K venue. The name Les Disques du Crépuscule was coined by Honoré. Their first visible work as Crépuscule was the fanzine Plein Soleil, issued in June 1980. The company also issued recordings by Factory Records-affiliated artists as Factory Benelux.

Les Disques du Crépuscule went on to release diverse recordings by a cosmopolitan roster that included Michael Nyman, Wim Mertens, Anna Domino, Paul Haig, Josef K, Cabaret Voltaire, Mikado, Cathy Claret, Isabelle Antena, Louis Philippe (under the aliases of The Border Boys and The Arcadians), Gavin Bryars, Bill Nelson, Richard Jobson, Isolation Ward, Thick Pigeon, The Pale Fountains, Tirez Tirez, Tuxedomoon, Repetition, and many others. Cosmopolitan, and notably popular in Japan, the label is also celebrated for the artwork of design director Benoit Hennebert.

Various compilations highlighting different aspects of the Crépuscule roster were issued by the label in its original form, including the landmark cassette release "From Brussels With Love" (TWI 007), featuring John Foxx, Thomas Dolby, Bill Nelson, Brian Eno (in conversation), Durutti Column and The Names among others. "The Fruit of the Original Sin" (TWI 035) was a lavish double-vinyl set featuring Orange Juice, Durutti Column, Richard Jobson and many more. Festive set "Ghosts of Christmas Past" (TWI 058) featured many label regulars as well as Aztec Camera. Later several retail promos also appeared, notably "Non Peut Etre" (issued to highlight new releases during 1988).

== Factory Benelux ==
Initial Factory Benelux releases were by Factory Records artists, and were labelled as being "Factory Benelux/Les Disques du Crépuscule" editions. The first of these was a 7" by A Certain Ratio in August 1980, and singles by The Durutti Column and Section 25 followed in November 1980.

Thereafter Factory Benelux operated as a separate imprint, although the two labels shared the same premises and staff. Bands released were associated with Factory in Manchester, some being releases that one Factory director liked but another did not (e.g., Crispy Ambulance).

Factory Benelux ceased issuing new releases in 1988, although Crépuscule released some FBN-labeled CD reissues in 1990. The label was revived in 2013.

== Other sublabels ==
A UK-based sublabel, Operation Twilight, was run from 1982 to 1983 by Patrick Moore, who later achieved fame as writer Philip Hoare. Their second UK sub-label, Operation Afterglow (1985–1986) simply issued UK editions of Belgian releases.

Other sub-labels include Crépuscule Section Française, Crépuscule America and Crépuscule Au Japon (1983–2002), Interference, Dancyclopaedia and Another Side (1984–1987), and video label Les Images Du Crépuscule. Crépuscule also assisted in the launch of industrial label L.A.Y.L.A.H. Antirecords (1984–1989), éL Benelux, Little Circle and Interior Music (run with James Nice of LTM).

== Closure ==
Having relocated to Paris in the late 1990s, the label became dormant after 2004. Duval went on to work in music publishing at Virgin and Because Music. Honoré's relationship with Joy Division singer Ian Curtis was dramatized in Control, the 2007 film directed by Anton Corbijn.

Many of the artists, including Isabelle Antena, Blaine L. Reininger (Tuxedomoon), Winston Tong (Tuxedomoon), Paul Haig, Gavin Bryars, Anna Domino, Devine & Statton and Isolation Ward had their catalogue, old and new, re-issued by LTM Recordings retaining their original Crepuscule artwork. A few Crepuscule-themed collections also appeared on LTM, notably After Twilight (2011), a collection of previously-issued and specially-recorded tracks featuring curator Isabelle Antena plus Anna Domino, Paul Haig, The Names, Blaine L. Reininger and Cathy Claret.

== Reactivation ==
In 2012 and 2013, both Factory Benelux and Crépuscule were revived by James Nice of LTM with the blessing of Duval and Honoré. This gave rise to many reissues, along with new releases by Helen Marnie, Marsheaux, 23 Skidoo and Penelope Queen (daughter of Isabelle Antena), as well as Section 25, The Wake and The Names on Factory Benelux. Nice has also worked with Duval on new Crépuscule projects.

== See also ==
- Factory Benelux discography

== Sources ==
- History of the label (Frank Brinkhuis)
- Nice, James (2011) [2010]. Shadowplayers: The Rise and Fall of Factory Records (paperback ed.). London: Aurum Press. ISBN 978-1-84513-634-5.
