= Factory Records =

British record label

- Founded: 1978; 48 years ago
- Founder: Alan Erasmus; Rob Gretton; Martin Hannett; Tony Wilson
- Defunct: 1992; 34 years ago
- Status: Defunct
- Distributor: Pinnacle Distribution (in the UK); Warner Records (in the US); WEA International (worldwide); Rhino Entertainment (Reissues); Virgin Music Label & Artist Services (select)
- Genre: Post-punk, alternative dance
- Country of origin: United Kingdom
- Location: Manchester

Factory Records was a Manchester-based British independent record label founded in 1978 by Tony Wilson and Alan Erasmus.

The label featured several important acts on its roster, including Joy Division, New Order, A Certain Ratio, the Durutti Column, Happy Mondays, Northside, and (briefly) Orchestral Manoeuvres in the Dark (OMD) and James. Factory also ran The Haçienda nightclub, in partnership with New Order.

Factory Records used a creative team (most notably record producer Martin Hannett and graphic designer Peter Saville) which gave the label and the artists recording for it a particular sound and image. The label employed a unique cataloguing system that gave a number not just to its musical releases, but also to various other related miscellany, including artwork, films, living beings, and even Wilson's own coffin.

== History ==
=== 'The Factory' ===
The Factory name was first used for a club in May 1978; the first Factory night was on the 26 May 1978. The club became a Manchester legend in its own right, being known variously as the Russell Club, Caribbean Club, PSV (Public Service Vehicles) Club (so titled as it was originally a social club for bus drivers who worked from the nearby depot) and 'The Factory'. The 'Factory' night at The Russell Club was launched by Alan Erasmus, Tony Wilson, and helped by promoter Alan Wise. As well as attracting numerous touring bands to the area and many upcoming post punk bands, it featured local bands including the Durutti Column (managed at the time by Erasmus and Wilson), Cabaret Voltaire from Sheffield and Joy Division. The club was demolished in 2001. The club was located on the NE corner of the now demolished Hulme Crescents development, on the corner of Royce Rd and Clayburn St (53°28′04.5″N 2°15′00.2″W). Peter Saville designed advertising for the club, and in September Factory released an EP of music by acts who had played at the club (the Durutti Column, Joy Division, Cabaret Voltaire and comedian John Dowie) called A Factory Sample.

=== 1978 and 1979 ===
As a follow-on from the successful 'Factory Nights' held at the Russell Club, Factory Records made their first release, A Factory Sample, in January 1979. At that time there was a punk label in Manchester called Rabid Records, run by Tosh Ryan and Martin Hannett. It had several successful acts, including Slaughter & the Dogs (whose tour manager was Rob Gretton), John Cooper Clarke, and Jilted John. After his seminal TV series So It Goes, Tony Wilson was interested in the way Rabid Records ran, and was convinced that the real money and power were in album sales. With a lot of discussion, Tony Wilson, Rob Gretton and Alan Erasmus set up Factory Records, with Martin Hannett from Rabid.

In 1978, Wilson compered the new wave afternoon at Deeply Vale Festival. This was actually the fourth live appearance by the fledgling Durutti Column and that afternoon Wilson also introduced an appearance (very early in their career) by the Fall, featuring Mark E. Smith and Marc "Lard" Riley on bass guitar.

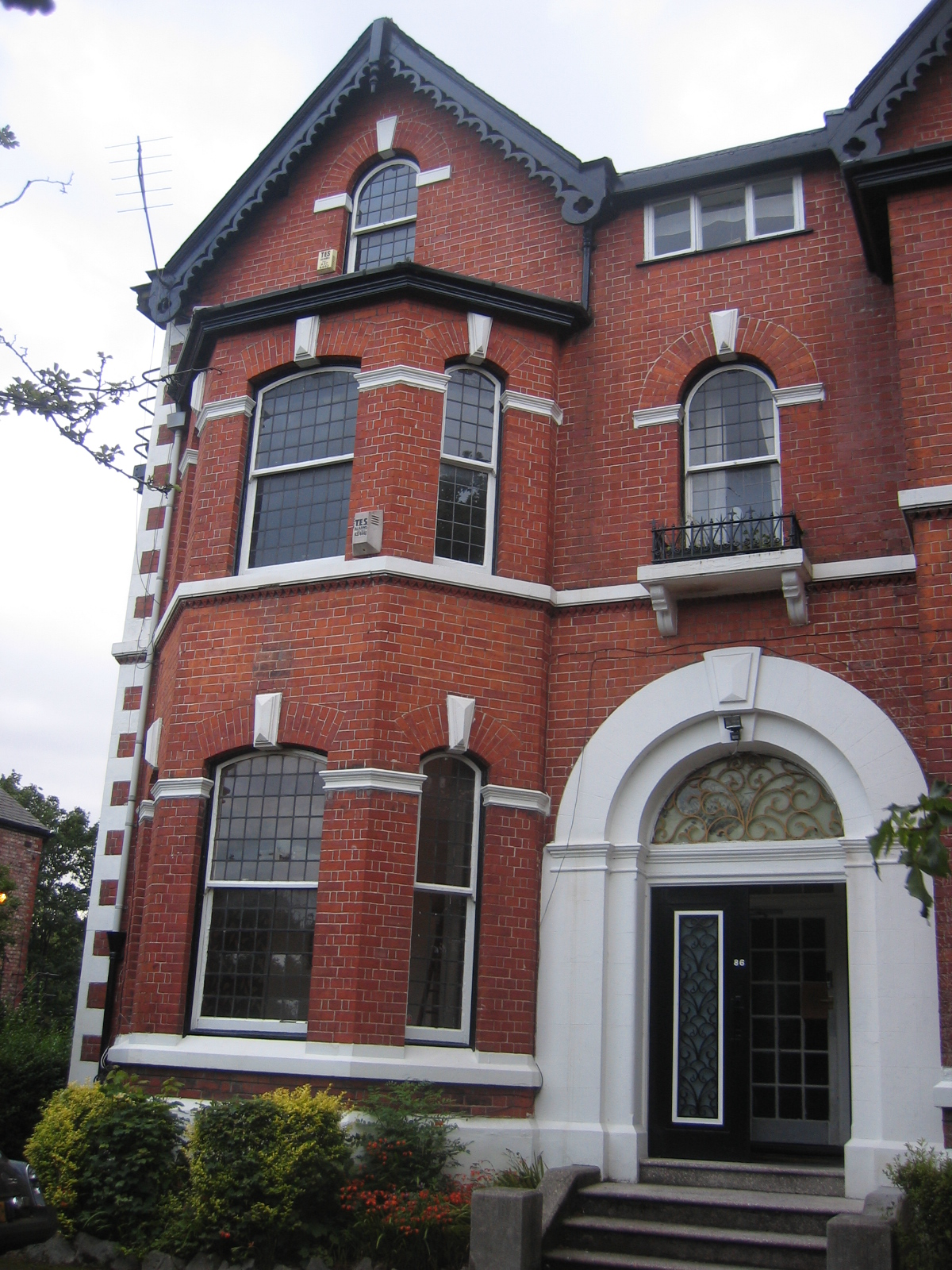
The first Factory Records office, 86 Palatine Road in West Didsbury, Manchester.

The Factory label set up an office in Erasmus' home on the first floor of 86 Palatine Road (53°25′38.0″N 2°14′06.2″W), and the Factory Sample EP was released on 24 December 1978. Singles followed by A Certain Ratio (who would stay with the label) and Orchestral Manoeuvres in the Dark (who left for Virgin Records shortly afterwards). The first Factory LP, Joy Division's Unknown Pleasures, was released in June 1979.

=== 1980s ===
In January 1980, The Return of the Durutti Column was released, the first in a long series of releases by guitarist Vini Reilly. In May, Joy Division singer Ian Curtis died by suicide shortly before a planned tour of the US. The following month saw Joy Division's single "Love Will Tear Us Apart" reach the UK top twenty, and their second album Closer was released the following month. In late 1980, the remaining members of Joy Division decided to continue as New Order. Factory branched out, with Factory Benelux being run as an independent label in conjunction with Les Disques du Crepuscule, and Factory US organising distribution for the UK label's releases in America.

In 1981, Factory and New Order opened a nightclub and preparations were made to convert a Victorian textile factory near the centre of Manchester, which had lately seen service as a motor boat showroom. Hannett left the label, as he had wanted to open a recording studio instead, and subsequently sued for unpaid royalties (the case was settled out of court in 1984). Saville also quit as a partner due to problems with payments, although he continued to work for Factory. Wilson, Erasmus and Gretton formed Factory Communications Ltd.

The Haçienda's interior before opening

The Haçienda (FAC 51) opened in May 1982. Although successful in terms of attendance, and attracting a lot of praise for Ben Kelly's interior design, the club lost large amounts of money in its first few years due largely to the low prices charged for entrance and at the bar, which was markedly cheaper than nearby pubs. Adjusting bar prices failed to help matters as crowds were increasingly preferring ecstasy to alcohol by the mid-1980s. Therefore, the Haçienda ended up costing tens of thousands of pounds every month.

In 1983, New Order's "Blue Monday" (FAC 73) became an international chart hit. However, the label did not make any money from it since the original sleeve, die-cut and designed to look like a floppy disk, was so costly to make that the label lost £0.05 (equivalent to £0.17 in 2025) on every copy they sold. Saville noted that nobody at Factory expected "Blue Monday" to be a commercially successful record at all, so nobody expected the cost to be an issue.

Happy Mondays released their first album in 1985. New Order and Happy Mondays became the most successful bands on the label, bankrolling a host of other projects. Factory and the Haçienda became a cultural hub of the emerging techno and acid house genres and their amalgamation with post-punk guitar music (the "Madchester" scene). Mick Middles' book Joy Division to New Order published in 1986 by Virgin Books (later being reprinted under the title Factory). In 1989, the label extended its reach to fringe punk folk outfit To Hell With Burgundy. Factory also opened a bar (The Dry Bar, FAC 201) and a shop (The Area, FAC 281) in the Northern Quarter of Manchester.

=== 1990s ===
Factory's headquarters (FAC 251) on Charles Street, near the Oxford Road BBC building, were opened in September 1990; prior to this, the company was still registered at Alan Erasmus' flat in Didsbury.

In 1991, Factory suffered two tragedies: the deaths of Martin Hannett and Dave Rowbotham. Hannett had recently re-established a relationship with the label, working with Happy Mondays, and tributes including a compilation album and a festival were organised. Rowbotham was one of the first musicians signed by the label; he was an original member of the Durutti Column and shared the guitar role with Vini Reilly; he was murdered and his body was found in his flat in Burnage. Saville's association with Factory was now reduced to simply designing for New Order and their solo projects (the band itself was in suspension, with various members recording as Electronic, Revenge and the Other Two).

By 1992, the label's two most successful bands caused the label serious financial trouble. The Happy Mondays were recording their troubled fourth album Yes Please! in Barbados, and New Order reportedly spent £400,000 on recording their comeback album Republic. London Records were interested in taking over Factory but the deal fell through when it emerged that, due to Factory's early practice of eschewing contracts, New Order rather than the label owned New Order's back catalogue.

Factory Communications Ltd, the company formed in 1981, declared bankruptcy in November 1992. Many former Factory acts, including New Order, found a new home at London Records.

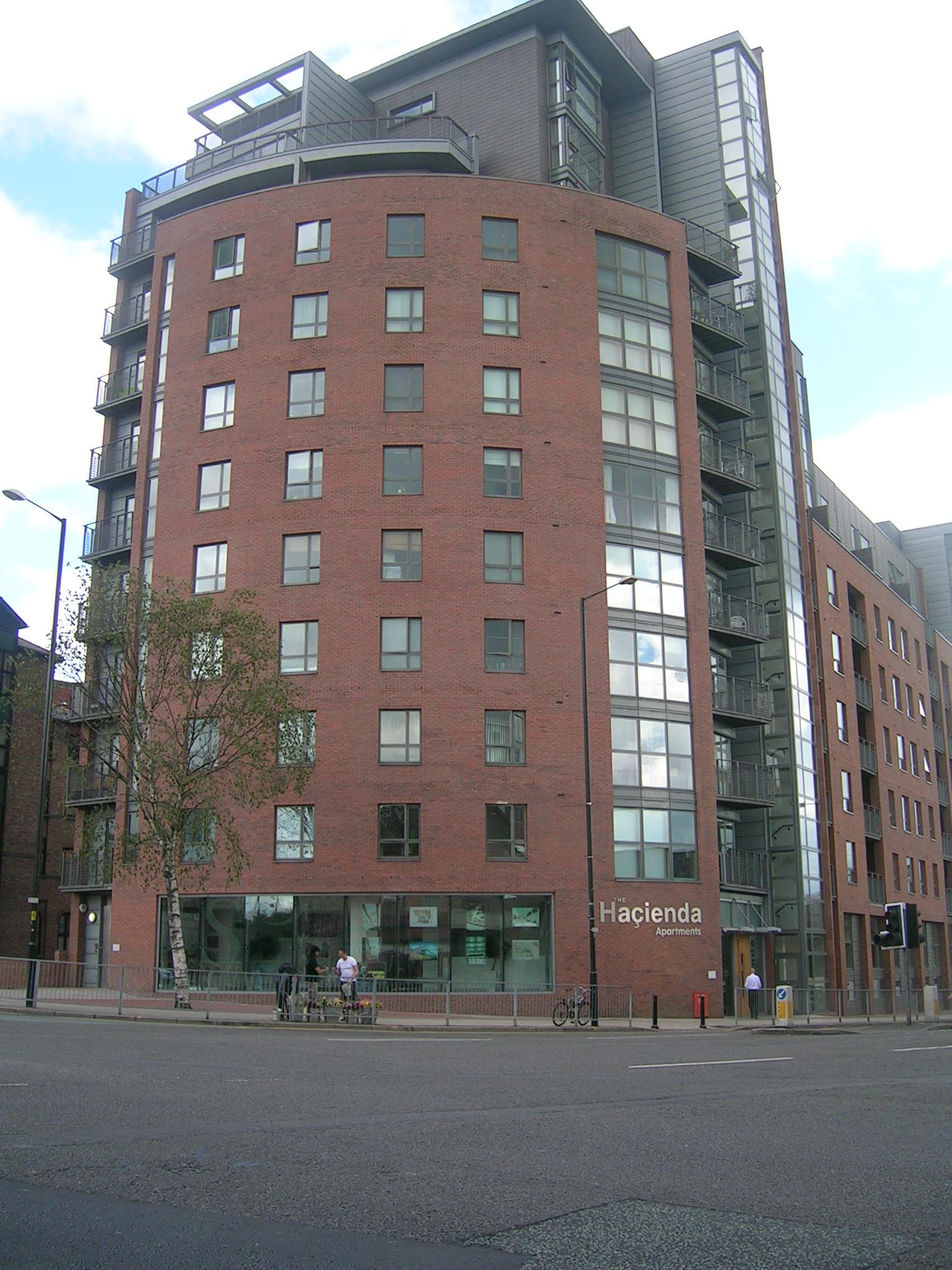
The new Haçienda apartments in 2007

The Haçienda closed in 1997 and the building was demolished shortly afterwards. It was replaced by a modern luxury apartment block in 2003, also called The Haçienda. In October 2009, Peter Hook published his book on his time as co-owner of the Haçienda, How Not to Run a Club, and in 2010 he had six bass guitars made using wood from the Haçienda's dancefloor.

=== 2000s ===
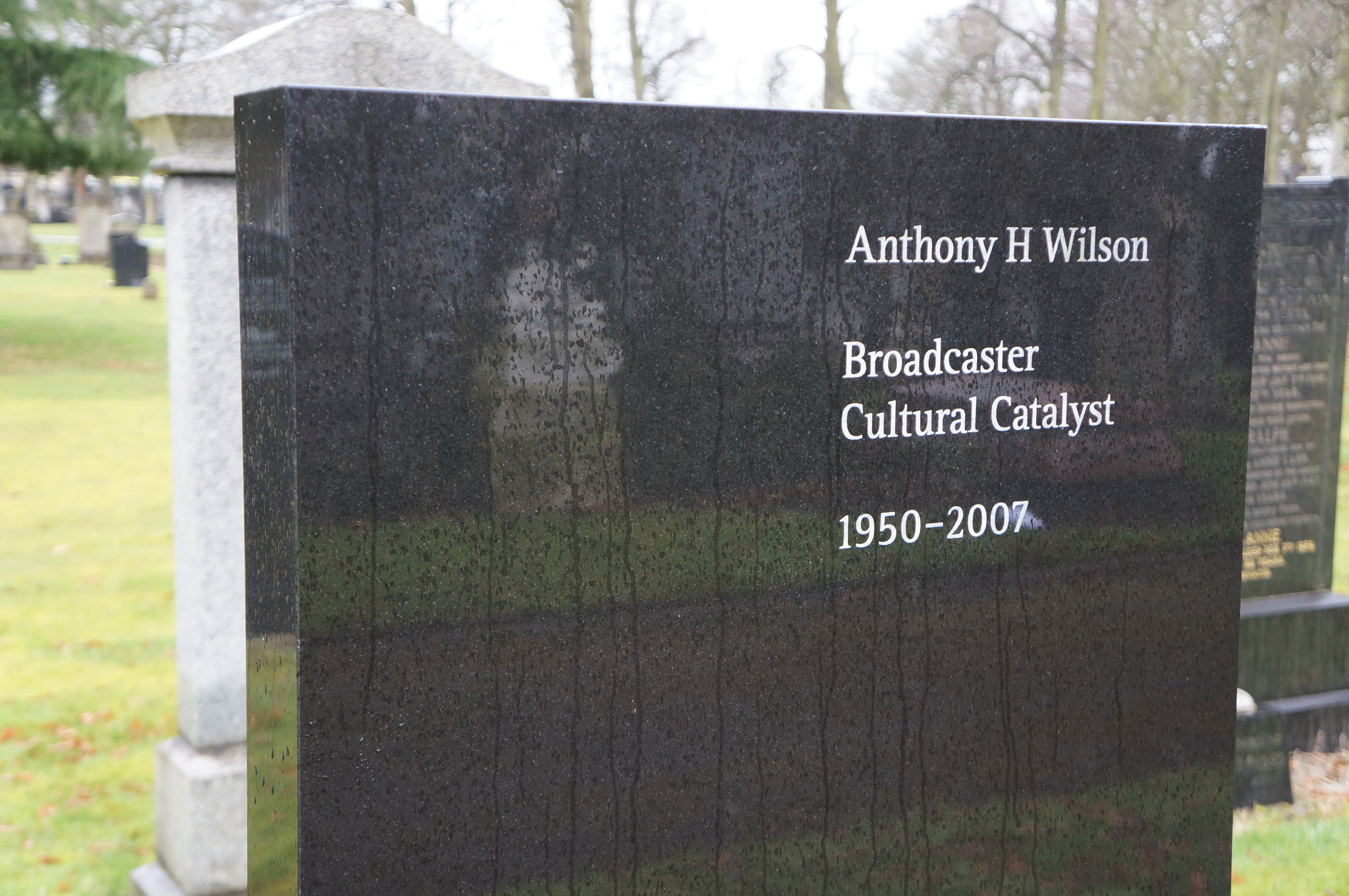
The top of Wilson's gravestone, designed by Peter Saville and Ben Kelly.

The 2002 film 24 Hour Party People is centred on Factory Records, the Haçienda, and the infamous, often unsubstantiated anecdotes and stories surrounding them. Many of the people associated with Factory, including Tony Wilson, have minor parts; the central character, based on Wilson, is played by actor and comedian Steve Coogan.

Anthony Wilson, Factory Records' founder, died on 10 August 2007 at age 57, from complications arising from renal cancer.

Colin Sharp, the Durutti Column singer during 1978 who took part in the A Factory Sample EP, died on 7 September 2009, after suffering a brain haemorrhage. Although his involvement with Factory was brief, Sharp was an associate for a short while of Martin Hannett and wrote a book called Who Killed Martin Hannett, which upset Hannett's surviving relatives, who stated the book included numerous untruths and fiction. Only months after Sharp's death, Larry Cassidy, Section 25's bassist and singer, died of unknown causes, on 27 February 2010.

In early 2010, Peter Hook, in collaboration with the Haçienda's original interior designer Ben Kelly and British audio specialists Funktion-One, renovated and reopened FAC 251 (the former Factory Records headquarters on Charles Street) as a nightclub. The club still holds its original name, FAC 251, but people refer to it as "Factory". Despite Ben Kelly's design influences, Peter Hook insists, "It's not the Haçienda for fucks [sic] sake". The club has a weekly agenda, featuring DJs and live bands of various genres.

In May 2010, James Nice, owner of LTM Recordings, published the book Shadowplayers. The book charts the rise and fall of Factory and offers detailed accounts and information about many key figures involved with the label.

=== FAC numbers ===
Musical releases, and essentially anything closely associated with the label, were given a catalogue number in the form of either FAC, or FACT, followed by a number. FACT was reserved for full-length albums, while FAC was used for both single song releases and many other Factory "productions", including: posters (FAC 1 advertised a club night), The Haçienda (FAC 51), a lawsuit filed against Factory Records by Martin Hannett (FAC 61), a hairdressing salon (FAC 98), a broadcast of Channel 4's The Tube TV series (FAC 104), customised packing tape (FAC 136), a bucket on a restored watermill (FAC 148), the Haçienda cat (FAC 191), a bet between Wilson and Gretton (FAC 253), a radio advertisement (FAC 294), and a website (FAC 421). Similar numbering was used for compact disc media releases (FACD), CD Video releases (FACDV), Factory Benelux releases (FAC BN or FBN), Factory US releases (FACTUS), and Gap Records Australia releases (FACOZ), with many available numbers restricted to record releases and other directly artist-related content.

Numbers were not allocated in strict chronological order; numbers for Joy Division and New Order releases generally ended in 3, 5, or 0 (with most Joy Division and New Order albums featuring multiples of 25), A Certain Ratio and Happy Mondays in 2, and the Durutti Column in 4. Factory Classical releases were 226, 236 and so on.

Despite the demise of Factory Records in 1992, the catalogue was still active. Additions included the 24 Hour Party People film (FAC 401), its website (FAC 433) and DVD release (FACDVD 424), and a book, Factory Records: The Complete Graphic Album (FAC 461).

Even Tony Wilson's coffin received a Factory catalogue number; FAC 501.

=== Factory Classical ===
In 1989, Factory Classical was launched with five albums by composer Steve Martland, the Kreisler String Orchestra, the Duke String Quartet (which included Durutti Column viola player John Metcalfe), oboe player Robin Williams and pianist Rolf Hind. Composers included Martland, Benjamin Britten, Paul Hindemith, Francis Poulenc, Dmitri Shostakovich, Michael Tippett, György Ligeti and Elliott Carter. Releases continued until 1992, including albums by Graham Fitkin, vocal duo Red Byrd, a recording of Erik Satie's Socrate, Piers Adams playing Handel's Recorder Sonatas, Walter Hus and further recordings both of Martland's compositions and of the composer playing Mozart.

== Successor labels ==
In 1994, Wilson attempted to revive Factory Records, in collaboration with London Records, as "Factory Too". The first release was by Factory stalwarts the Durutti Column; the other main acts on the label were Hopper and Space Monkeys, and the label gave a UK release to the first album by Stephin Merritt's side project the 6ths, Wasps' Nests. A further release ensued: a compilation EP featuring previously unsigned Manchester acts East West Coast, the Orch, Italian Love Party, and K-Track. This collection of 8 tracks (2 per band) was simply entitled A Factory Sample Too (FACD2.02). The label was active until the late 1990s, latterly independent of London Records, as was "Factory Once", which organised reissues of Factory material.

Wilson founded a short-lived fourth incarnation, F4 Records, in the early 2000s.

In 2012, Peter Saville and James Nice formed a new company called Factory Records Ltd., in association with Alan Erasmus and Oliver Wilson (son of Tony). This released only a vinyl reissue of From the Hip by Section 25. Nice subsequently revived the Factory Benelux imprint for Factory reissues, and for new recordings by Factory-associated bands. In 2019, Warner Music Group marked the 40th anniversary of Factory as a record label with a website, exhibition, and select vinyl editions including Unknown Pleasures and box set compilation Communications 1978-1992.

== Factory Records recording artists ==
The bands with the most numerous releases on Factory Records include Joy Division/New Order, Happy Mondays, Durutti Column and A Certain Ratio. Each of these bands has between 15 and 30 FAC numbers attributed to their releases.

== Retrospective ==
An exhibition by Colin Gibbins took place celebrating the 20th anniversary of the closing of Factory Records (1978–1992) and its musical output, Colin's collection was displayed at the Ice Plant, Manchester, between 4 and 7 May 2012. The exhibition was called FACTVM (from the Latin for 'deed accomplished').

In October 2019, a new box set was released containing both rarities and the label’s releases from its first two years.

From 19 June 2021 until 3 January 2022, Manchester's Science and Industry Museum hosted an exhibition commemorating Factory Records entitled 'Use Hearing Protection: The early years of Factory Records' Featuring graphic designs by Peter Saville, previously unseen items from the Factory archives, and objects loaned from the estates of both Tony Wilson and Rob Gretton, the former manager of Joy Division and New Order.
