= Story within a story =

Literary device

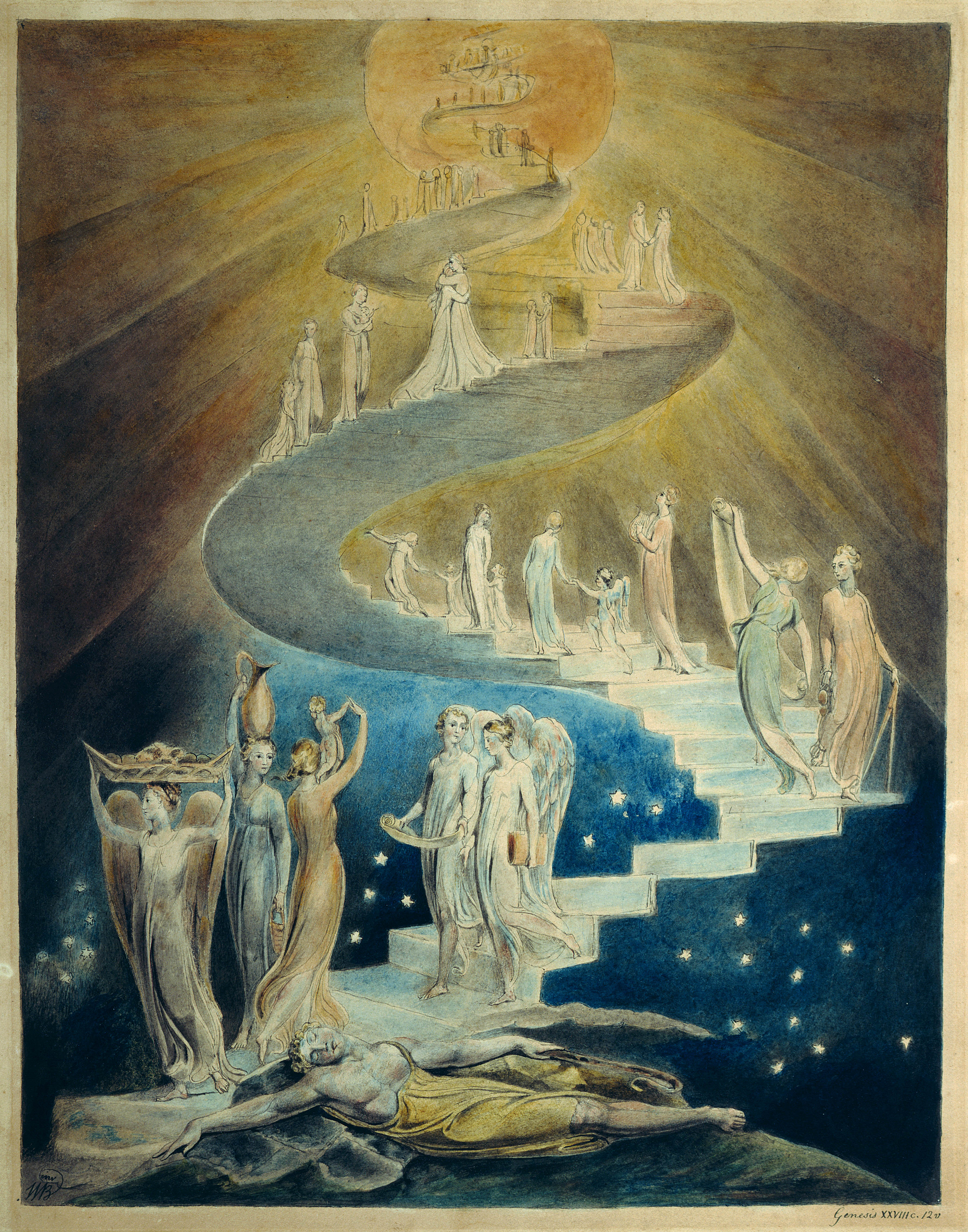
In the Bible, Jacob has a dream about a ladder to heaven. Having a character dream is a common device for embedding one narrative or scene within another. (Painting by William Blake, 1805)

A story within a story, also referred to as an embedded narrative, is a narrative device in which a character within a story becomes the narrator of an additional second story. Multiple layers of stories within stories are sometimes called nested stories. A play may include a brief play within it, as in Shakespeare's Hamlet (a "play within a play"); a film may show the characters watching a short film; or a novel may contain a short story within it. A story within a story can thus occur in any narrative forms, including poems and songs. If the majority of a story's content is introduced or presented using the device of embedded narrative (i.e. a less-detailed "outer" story that contains the main detailed story), this is also called a frame narrative.

Stories within stories can be used simply to enhance entertainment for the reader or viewer, or can act as examples to teach lessons to other characters. The inner story often has a symbolic and psychological significance for the characters in the outer story. There is often some parallel between the two stories, and the fiction of the inner story is used to reveal the truth in the outer story. Often the stories within a story are used to satirize views, not only in the outer story, but also in the real world. When a story is told within another instead of being told as part of the plot, it allows the author to play on the reader's perceptions of the characters—the motives and the reliability of the storyteller are automatically in question.

Stories within stories may disclose the background of characters or events, tell of myths and legends that influence the plot, or even seem to be extraneous diversions from the plot. In some cases, the story within a story is involved in the action of the plot of the outer story. In others, the inner story is independent and could either be skipped or stand separately, although many subtle connections may be lost. Often there is more than one level of internal stories, leading to deeply-nested fiction. Mise en abyme is the French term for a similar literary device (also referring to the practice in heraldry of placing the image of a small shield on a larger shield).

== Frame stories and anthology works ==
The literary device of stories within a story dates back to a device known as a "frame story", where a supplemental story is used to help tell the main story. Typically, the outer story or "frame" does not have much matter, and most of the work consists of one or more complete stories told by one or more storytellers.

The earliest examples of "frame stories" and "stories within stories" were in ancient Egyptian and Indian literature, such as the Egyptian "Tale of the Shipwrecked Sailor" and Indian epics like the Ramayana, Seven Wise Masters, Hitopadesha and Vikrama and Vethala. In Vishnu Sarma's Panchatantra, an interwoven series of colorful animal tales are told with one narrative opening within another, sometimes three or four layers deep, and then unexpectedly snapping shut in irregular rhythms to sustain attention. In the epic Mahabharata, the Kurukshetra War is narrated by a character in Vyasa's Jaya, which itself is narrated by a character in Vaisampayana's Bharata, which itself is narrated by a character in Ugrasrava's Mahabharata.

Both The Golden Ass by Apuleius and Metamorphoses by Ovid extend the depths of framing to several degrees. Another early example is the One Thousand and One Nights (Arabian Nights), where the general story is narrated by an unknown narrator, and in this narration the stories are told by Scheherazade. In many of Scheherazade's narrations, there are also stories narrated, and even in some of these, there are other stories. An example of this is "The Three Apples", a murder mystery narrated by Scheherazade. Within the story, after the murderer reveals himself, he narrates a flashback of events leading up to the murder. Within this flashback, an unreliable narrator tells a story to mislead the would-be murderer, who later discovers that he was misled after another character narrates the truth to him. As the story concludes, the "Tale of Núr al-Dín Alí and his Son" is narrated within it. This perennially popular work can be traced back to Arabic, Persian, and Indian storytelling traditions.

Mary Shelley's Frankenstein has a deeply nested frame story structure, that features the narration of Walton, who records the narration of Victor Frankenstein, who recounts the narration of his creation, who narrates the story of a cabin dwelling family he secretly observes. Another classic novel with a frame story is Wuthering Heights, the majority of which is recounted by the central family's housekeeper to a boarder. Similarly, Roald Dahl's story The Wonderful Story of Henry Sugar is about a rich bachelor who finds an essay written by someone who learned to "see" playing cards from the reverse side. The full text of this essay is included in the story, and itself includes a lengthy sub-story told as a true experience by one of the essay's protagonists, Imhrat Khan.

Lewis Carroll's Alice books, Alice's Adventures in Wonderland (1865) and Through the Looking-Glass (1871), have several multiple poems that are mostly recited by several characters to the titular character. The most notable examples are "You Are Old, Father William", "'Tis the Voice of the Lobster", "Jabberwocky", and "The Walrus and the Carpenter".

Chaucer's The Canterbury Tales and Boccaccio's Decameron are also classic frame stories. In The Canterbury Tales, the characters tell tales suited to their personalities and tell them in ways that highlight their personalities. The noble knight tells a noble story, the boring character tells a very dull tale, and the rude miller tells a smutty tale. Homer's Odyssey too makes use of this device; Odysseus' adventures at sea are all narrated by Odysseus to the court of king Alcinous in Scheria. Other shorter tales, many of them false, account for much of the Odyssey. Many modern children's story collections are essentially anthology works connected by this device, such as Arnold Lobel's Mouse Tales, Paula Fox's The Little Swineherd, and Phillip and Hillary Sherlock's Ears and Tails and Common Sense.

A well-known modern example of framing is the fantasy genre work The Princess Bride (both the book and the film). In the film, a grandfather is reading the story of The Princess Bride to his grandson. In the book, a more detailed frame story has a father editing a much longer (but fictive) work for his son, creating his own "Good Parts Version" (as the book called it) by leaving out all the parts that would bore or displease a young boy. Both the book and the film assert that the central story is from a book called The Princess Bride by a nonexistent author named S. Morgenstern.

In the Welsh novel Aelwyd F'Ewythr Robert (1852) by Gwilym Hiraethog, a visitor to a farm in north Wales tells the story of Uncle Tom's Cabin to those gathered around the hearth.

Sometimes a frame story exists in the same setting as the main story. On the television series The Young Indiana Jones Chronicles, each episode was framed as though it were being told by Indy when he was older (usually acted by George Hall, but once by Harrison Ford). The same device of an adult narrator representing the older version of a young protagonist is used in the films Stand by Me and A Christmas Story, and the television show The Wonder Years and How I Met Your Mother.

=== Frame stories in music ===
In The Amory Wars, a tale told through the music of Coheed and Cambria, tells a story for the first two albums but reveals that the story is being actively written by a character called the Writer in the third. During the album, the Writer delves into his own story and kills one of the characters, much to the dismay of the main character.

The critically acclaimed Beatles album Sgt. Pepper's Lonely Hearts Club Band is presented as a stage show by the fictional eponymous band, and one of its songs, "A Day in the Life", is in the form of a story within a dream. Similarly, the Fugees album The Score is presented as the soundtrack to a fictional film, as are several other notable concept albums, while Wyclef Jean's The Carnival is presented as testimony at a trial. The majority of Ayreon's albums outline a sprawling, loosely interconnected science fiction narrative, as do the albums of Janelle Monae.

On Tom Waits's concept album Alice (consisting of music he wrote for the musical of the same name), most of the songs are (very) loosely inspired by both Alice in Wonderland, and the book's real-life author, Lewis Carroll, and inspiration Alice Liddell. The song "Poor Edward", however, is presented as a story told by a narrator about Edward Mordrake, and the song "Fish and Bird" is presented as a retold story that the narrator heard from a sailor.

== Examples of nested stories by type ==
=== Nested books ===
In his 1895 historical novel Pharaoh, Bolesław Prus introduces a number of stories within the story, ranging in length from vignettes to full-blown stories, many of them drawn from ancient Egyptian texts, that further the plot, illuminate characters, and even inspire the fashioning of individual characters. Jan Potocki's The Manuscript Found in Saragossa (1797–1805) has an interlocking structure with stories-within-stories reaching several levels of depth.

The provenance of the story is sometimes explained internally, as in The Lord of the Rings by J. R. R. Tolkien, which depicts the Red Book of Westmarch (a story-internal version of the book itself) as a history compiled by several of the characters. The subtitle of The Hobbit ("There and Back Again") is depicted as part of a rejected title of this book within a book, and The Lord of the Rings is a part of the final title.

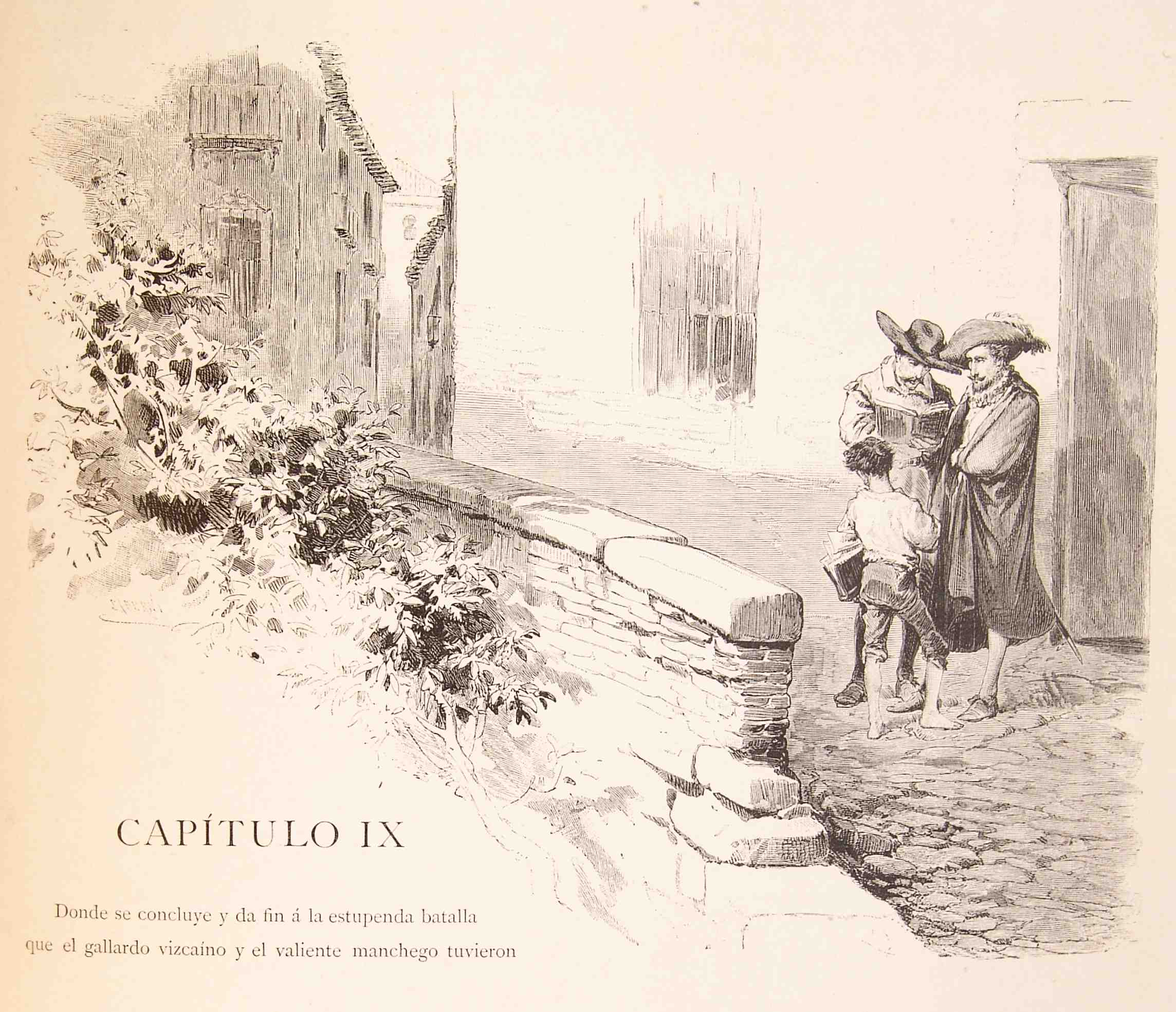
Cervantes finds the manuscript with the further adventures of Don Quixote. Illustration by Ricardo Balaca for the 1880 edition.

An example of an interconnected inner story is "The Mad Trist" in Edgar Allan Poe's Fall of the House of Usher, where through somewhat mystical means the narrator's reading of the story within a story influences the reality of the story he has been telling, so that what happens in "The Mad Trist" begins happening in "The Fall of the House of Usher". Also, in Don Quixote by Miguel de Cervantes, there are many stories within the story that influence the hero's actions (there are others that even the author himself admits are purely digressive). Most of the first part is presented as a translation of a found manuscript by (fictional) Cide Hamete Benengeli.

A commonly independently anthologised story is "The Grand Inquisitor" by Dostoevsky from his long psychological novel The Brothers Karamazov, which is told by one brother to another to explain, in part, his view on religion and morality. It also, in a succinct way, dramatizes many of Dostoevsky's interior conflicts.

An example of a "bonus material" style inner story is the chapter "The Town Ho's Story" in Herman Melville's novel Moby-Dick; that chapter tells a fully formed story of an exciting mutiny and contains many plot ideas that Melville had conceived during the early stages of writing Moby-Dick—ideas originally intended to be used later in the novel—but as the writing progressed, these plot ideas eventually proved impossible to fit around the characters that Melville went on to create and develop. Instead of discarding the ideas altogether, Melville wove them into a coherent short story and had the character Ishmael demonstrate his eloquence and intelligence by telling the story to his impressed friends.

One of the most complicated structures of a story within a story was used by Vladimir Nabokov in his novel The Gift. There, as inner stories, function both poems and short stories by the main character Fyodor Cherdyntsev as well as the whole Chapter IV, a critical biography of Nikolay Chernyshevsky (also written by Fyodor). This novel is considered one of the first metanovels in literature.

With the rise of literary modernism, writers experimented with ways in which multiple narratives might nest imperfectly within each other. A particularly ingenious example of nested narratives is James Merrill's 1974 modernist poem "Lost in Translation".

In Rabih Alameddine's novel The Hakawati, or The Storyteller, the protagonist describes coming home to the funeral of his father, one of a long line of traditional Arabic storytellers. Throughout the narrative, the author becomes hakawati (an Arabic word for a teller of traditional tales) himself, weaving the tale of the story of his own life and that of his family with folkloric versions of tales from Qur'an, the Old Testament, Ovid, and One Thousand and One Nights. Both the tales he tells of his family (going back to his grandfather) and the embedded folk tales, themselves embed other tales, often 2 or more layers deep.

In Sue Townsend's Adrian Mole: The Wilderness Years, Adrian writes the book Lo! The Flat Hills of My Homeland, in which the character Jake Westmorland writes a book called Sparg of Kronk, where the character Sparg writes a book with no language.

In Anthony Horowitz's Magpie Murders, a significant proportion of the book features a fictional but authentically formatted mystery novel by Alan Conway, titled 'Magpie Murders'. The secondary novel ends before its conclusion returning the narrative to the original, and primary, story where the protagonist and reviewer of the book attempts to find the final chapter. As this progresses characters and messages within the fictional Magpie Murders manifest themselves within the primary narrative and the final chapter's content reveals the reason for its original absence.

Dreams are a common way of including stories inside stories, and can sometimes go several levels deep. Both the book The Arabian Nightmare and the curse of "eternal waking" from the Neil Gaiman series The Sandman feature an endless series of waking from one dream into another dream. In Charles Maturin's novel Melmoth the Wanderer, the use of vast stories-within-stories creates a sense of dream-like quality in the reader.

The 2023 Christian fictional novel Just Once by Karen Kingsbury features a series of three nested stories, all centering around the main characters of Hank and Irvel Myers:

- The outermost story (set in 2018) features their granddaughter, Audra, at a ceremony where the members of the Office of Strategic Services (OSS) will be recognized. Unknown to anyone in her family, Irvel served as a spy in OSS (she had told everyone she was a nurse), and the story would have been lost but for her father finding a set of forgotten videotapes while remodeling his childhood home.
- The next story (set in 1989) features Irvel being diagnosed with Alzheimer's disease; she and Hank decide to videotape their story before it is lost to Irvel's failing memory.
- The innermost story (set between 1940 and 1945) tells of Hank and Irvel's relationship before and after World War II, and her work within OSS.

==== Religion and philosophy ====
This structure is also found in classic religious and philosophical texts. The structure of The Symposium and Phaedo, attributed to Plato, is of a story within a story within a story. In the Christian Bible, the gospels are accounts of the life and ministry of Jesus. However, they also include within them the parables that Jesus told. In more modern philosophical works, Jostein Gaarder's books often feature this device. Examples are The Solitaire Mystery, where the protagonist receives a small book from a baker, in which the baker tells the story of a sailor who tells the story of another sailor, and Sophie's World, about a girl who is actually a character in a book that is being read by Hilde, a girl in another dimension. Later on in the book Sophie questions this idea, and realizes that Hilde too could be a character in a story that in turn is being read by another.

Mahabharata, an Indian epic that is also the world's longest epic, has a nested structure.

==== Nested science fiction ====
The experimental modernist works that incorporate multiple narratives into one story are quite often science fiction or science fiction influenced. These include most of the various novels written by the American author Kurt Vonnegut. Vonnegut includes the recurring character Kilgore Trout in many of his novels. Trout acts as the mysterious science fiction writer who enhances the morals of the novels through plot descriptions of his stories. Books such as Breakfast of Champions and God Bless You, Mr. Rosewater are sprinkled with these plot descriptions. Stanisław Lem's Tale of the Three Storytelling Machines of King Genius from The Cyberiad has several levels of storytelling. All levels tell stories of the same person, Trurl.

House of Leaves is the tale of a man who finds a manuscript telling the story of a documentary that may or may not have ever existed, contains multiple layers of plot. The book includes footnotes and letters that tell their own stories only vaguely related to the events in the main narrative of the book, and footnotes for fake books.

Robert A. Heinlein's later books (The Number of the Beast, The Cat Who Walks Through Walls and To Sail Beyond the Sunset) propose the idea that every real universe is a fiction in another universe. This hypothesis enables many writers who are characters in the books to interact with their own creations. Margaret Atwood's novel The Blind Assassin is interspersed with excerpts from a novel written by one of the main characters; the novel-within-a-novel itself contains a science fiction story written by one of that novel's characters.

In Philip K. Dick's novel The Man in the High Castle, each character comes into interaction with a book called The Grasshopper Lies Heavy, which was written by the Man in the High Castle. As Dick's novel details a world in which the Axis Powers of World War II had succeeded in dominating the known world, the novel within the novel details an alternative to this history in which the Allies overcome the Axis and bring stability to the world – a victory which itself is quite different from real history.

In Red Orc's Rage by Philip José Farmer, a doubly recursive method is used to intertwine its fictional layers. This novel is part of a science fiction series, the World of Tiers. Farmer collaborated in the writing of this novel with an American psychiatrist, A. James Giannini, who had previously used the World of Tiers series in treating patients in group therapy. During these therapeutic sessions, the content and process of the text and novelist was discussed rather than the lives of the patients. In this way subconscious defenses could be circumvented. Farmer took the real life case-studies and melded these with adventures of his characters in the series.

The Quantum Leap novel Knights of the Morningstar also features a character who writes a book by that name. In Matthew Stover's Star Wars novel Shatterpoint, the protagonist Mace Windu narrates the story within his journal, while the main story is being told from the third-person limited point of view.

Several Star Trek tales are stories or events within stories, such as Gene Roddenberry's novelization of Star Trek: The Motion Picture, J. A. Lawrence's Mudd's Angels, John M. Ford's The Final Reflection, Margaret Wander Bonanno's Strangers from the Sky (which adopts the conceit that it is a book from the future by an author called Gen Jaramet-Sauner), and J. R. Rasmussen's "Research" in the anthology Star Trek: Strange New Worlds II. Steven Barnes's novelization of the Star Trek: Deep Space Nine episode "Far Beyond the Stars" partners with Greg Cox's The Eugenics Wars: The Rise and Fall of Khan Noonien Singh (Volume Two) to tell us that the fictional story "Far Beyond the Stars" (whose setting and cast closely resemble Deep Space Nine)—and, by extension, all of Star Trek itself—is the creation of 1950s writer Benny Russell.

The book Cloud Atlas (later adapted into a film by The Wachowskis and Tom Tykwer) consisted of six interlinked stories nested inside each other in a Russian doll fashion. The first story (that of Adam Ewing in the 1850s befriending an escaped slave) is interrupted halfway through and revealed to be part of a journal being read by composer Robert Frobisher in 1930s Belgium. His own story of working for a more famous composer is told in a series of letters to his lover Rufus Sixsmith, which are interrupted halfway through and revealed to be in the possession of an investigative journalist named Luisa Rey and so on. Each of the first five tales are interrupted in the middle, with the sixth tale being told in full, before the preceding five tales are finished in reverse order. Each layer of the story either challenges the veracity of the previous layer, or is challenged by the succeeding layer. Presuming each layer to be a true telling within the overall story, a chain of events is created linking Adam Ewing's embrace of the abolitionist movement in the 1850s to the religious redemption of a post-apocalyptic tribal man over a century after the fall of modern civilization. The characters in each nested layer take inspiration or lessons from the stories of their predecessors in a manner that validates a belief stated in the sixth tale that "Our lives are not our own. We are bound to others, past and present and by each crime, and every kindness, we birth our future."

==== Play or film within a book ====
The Crying of Lot 49 by Thomas Pynchon has several characters seeing a play called The Courier's Tragedy by the fictitious Jacobean playwright Richard Wharfinger. The events of the play broadly mirror those of the novel and give the character Oedipa Maas a greater context to consider her predicament; the play concerns a feud between two rival mail distribution companies, which appears to be ongoing to the present day, and in which, if this is the case, Oedipa has found herself involved. As in Hamlet, the director makes changes to the original script; in this instance, a couplet that was added, possibly by religious zealots intent on giving the play extra moral gravity, are said only on the night that Oedipa sees the play.

From what Pynchon relates, this is the only mention in the play of Thurn and Taxis' rivals' name—Trystero—and it is the seed for the conspiracy that unfurls. A significant portion of Walter Moers' The Labyrinth of Dreaming Books is an ekphrasis on the subject of an epic puppet theater presentation. Another example is found in Samuel Delany's Trouble on Triton, which features a theater company that produces elaborate staged spectacles for randomly selected single-person audiences. Plays produced by the "Caws of Art" theater company also feature in Russell Hoban's modern fable, The Mouse and His Child. Raina Telgemeier's best-selling Drama is a graphic novel about a middle-school musical production, and the tentative romantic fumblings of its cast members.

In Manuel Puig's Kiss of the Spider Woman, ekphrases on various old movies, some real, and some fictional, make up a substantial portion of the narrative. In Paul Russell's Boys of Life, descriptions of movies by director/antihero Carlos (loosely inspired by controversial director Pier Paolo Pasolini) provide a narrative counterpoint and add a touch of surrealism to the main narrative. They additionally raise the question of whether works of artistic genius justify or atone for the sins and crimes of their creators. Paul Auster's The Book of Illusions (2002) and Theodore Roszak's Flicker (1991) also rely heavily on fictional films within their respective narratives.

=== Nested plays ===
This dramatic device was probably first used by Thomas Kyd in The Spanish Tragedy around 1587, where the play is presented before an audience of two of the characters, who comment upon the action. From references in other contemporary works, Kyd is also assumed to have been the writer of an early, lost version of Hamlet (the so-called Ur-Hamlet), with a play-within-a-play interlude. William Shakespeare's Hamlet retains this device by having Hamlet ask some strolling players to perform The Murder of Gonzago. The action and characters in The Murder mirror the murder of Hamlet's father in the main action, and Prince Hamlet writes additional material to emphasize this. Hamlet wishes to provoke the murderer, his uncle, and sums this up by saying "the play's the thing wherein I'll catch the conscience of the king." Hamlet calls this new play The Mouse-trap (a title that Agatha Christie later took for the long-running play The Mousetrap). Christie's work was parodied in Tom Stoppard's The Real Inspector Hound, in which two theater critics are drawn into the murder mystery they are watching. The audience is similarly absorbed into the action in Woody Allen's play God, which is about two failed playwrights in Ancient Greece. The phrase "The Conscience of the King" also became the title of a Star Trek episode featuring a production of Hamlet which leads to the exposure of a murderer (although not a king).

The play I Hate Hamlet and the movie A Midwinter's Tale are about a production of Hamlet, which in turn includes a production of The Murder of Gonzago, as does Tom Stoppard's Hamlet-based play Rosencrantz & Guildenstern Are Dead and subsequent film adaptation; which explores and deconstructs narrative concepts, and even features a third-level puppet theatre version of Gonzago within the play inside the film, and a scene in which the title characters observe the Tragedians performing a staged parody of their exploits in the ongoing story (including many that are yet to occur). Similarly, in Anton Chekhov's The Seagull there are specific allusions to Hamlet: in the first act a son stages a play to impress his mother, a professional actress, and her new lover; the mother responds by comparing her son to Hamlet. Later he tries to come between them, as Hamlet had done with his mother and her new husband. The tragic developments in the plot follow in part from the scorn the mother shows for her son's play.

Shakespeare adopted the play-within-a-play device for many of his other plays as well, including A Midsummer Night's Dream and Love's Labours Lost. Almost the whole of The Taming of the Shrew is a play-within-a-play, presented to convince Christopher Sly, a drunken tinker, that he is a nobleman watching a private performance, but the device has no relevance to the plot (unless Katharina's subservience to her "lord" in the last scene is intended to strengthen the deception against the tinker) and is often dropped in modern productions. The musical Kiss Me, Kate is about the production of a fictitious musical, The Taming of the Shrew, based on the comedy The Taming of the Shrew by William Shakespeare, and features several scenes from it. Pericles, Prince of Tyre draws in part on the 14th-century Confessio Amantis (itself a frame story) by John Gower, and Shakespeare has the ghost of Gower "assume man's infirmities" to introduce his work to the contemporary audience and comment on the action of the play.

In Francis Beaumont's Knight of the Burning Pestle (c. 1608) a supposed common citizen from the audience, actually a "planted" actor, condemns the play that has just started and "persuades" the players to present something about a shopkeeper. The citizen's "apprentice" then acts, pretending to extemporise, in the rest of the play. This is a satirical tilt at Beaumont's playwright contemporaries and their current fashion for offering plays about London life.

The opera Pagliacci is about a troupe of actors who perform a play about marital infidelity that mirrors their own lives, and composer Richard Rodney Bennett and playwright-librettist Beverley Cross's The Mines of Sulphur features a ghostly troupe of actors who perform a play about murder that similarly mirrors the lives of their hosts, from whom they depart, leaving them with the plague as nemesis. John Adams' Nixon in China (1985–1987) features a surreal version of Madam Mao's Red Detachment of Women, illuminating the ascendance of human values over the disillusionment of high politics in the meeting.

In Bertolt Brecht's The Caucasian Chalk Circle, a play is staged as a parable to villagers in the Soviet Union to justify the re-allocation of their farmland: the tale describes how a child is awarded to a servant-girl rather than its natural mother, an aristocrat, as the woman most likely to care for it well. This kind of play-within-a-play, which appears at the beginning of the main play and acts as a "frame" for it, is called an "induction". Brecht's one-act play The Elephant Calf (1926) is a play-within-a-play performed in the foyer of the theatre during his Man Equals Man.

In Jean Giraudoux's play Ondine, all of act two is a series of scenes within scenes, sometimes two levels deep. This increases the dramatic tension and also makes more poignant the inevitable failure of the relationship between the mortal Hans and water sprite Ondine.

The Two-Character Play by Tennessee Williams has a concurrent double plot with the convention of a play within a play. Felice and Clare are siblings and are both actor/producers touring The Two-Character Play. They have supposedly been abandoned by their crew and have been left to put on the play by themselves. The characters in the play are also brother and sister and are also named Clare and Felice.

The Mysteries, a modern reworking of the medieval mystery plays, remains faithful to its roots by having the modern actors play the sincere, naïve tradesmen and women as they take part in the original performances.

Alternatively, a play might be about the production of a play, and include the performance of all or part of the play, as in Noises Off, A Chorus of Disapproval, or Lilies. Similarly, the musical Man of La Mancha presents the story of Don Quixote as an impromptu play staged in prison by Quixote's author, Miguel de Cervantes.

In most stagings of the musical Cats, which include the song "Growltiger's Last Stand" – a recollection of an old play by Gus the Theatre Cat – the character of Lady Griddlebone sings "The Ballad of Billy McCaw". (However, many productions of the show omit "Growltiger's Last Stand", and "The Ballad of Billy McCaw" has at times been replaced with a mock aria, so this metastory is not always seen.) Depending on the production, there is another musical scene called "The Awful Battle of the Pekes and the Pollices" where the Jellicles put on a show for their leader. In Lestat: The Musical, there are three play within a plays. First, when Lestat visits his childhood friend, Nicolas, who works in a theater, where he discovers his love for theater; and two more when the Theater of the Vampires perform. One is used as a plot mechanism to explain the vampire god, Marius, which sparks an interest in Lestat to find him.

A play within a play occurs in the musical The King and I, where Princess Tuptim and the royal dancers give a performance of Small House of Uncle Thomas (or Uncle Tom's Cabin) to their English guests. The play mirrors Tuptim's situation, as she wishes to run away from slavery to be with her lover, Lun Tha.

In stagings of Dina Rubina's play Always the Same Dream, the story is about staging a school play based on a poem by Pushkin.

Joseph Heller's 1967 play We Bombed in New Haven is about actors engaged in a play about military airmen; the actors themselves become at times unsure whether they are actors or actual airmen.

The 1937 musical Babes in Arms is about a group of kids putting on a musical to raise money. The central plot device was retained for the popular 1939 film version with Judy Garland and Mickey Rooney. A similar plot was recycled for the films White Christmas and The Blues Brothers.

=== Nested films ===
The 1946 film noir The Locket contains a nested flashback structure, with a screenplay by Sheridan Gibney based on the story "What Nancy Wanted" by Norma Barzman.

The François Truffaut film Day for Night is about the making of a fictitious movie called Meet Pamela (Je vous présente Pamela) and shows the interactions of the actors as they are making this movie about a woman who falls for her husband's father. The story of Pamela involves lust, betrayal, death, sorrow, and change, events that are mirrored in the experiences of the actors portrayed in Day for Night. There are a wealth of other movies that revolve around the film industry itself, even if not centering exclusively on one nested film. These include the darkly satirical classic Sunset Boulevard about an aging star and her parasitic victim, and the Coen Brothers' farce Hail, Caesar!

The script to Karel Reisz's movie The French Lieutenant's Woman (1981), written by Harold Pinter, is a film-within-a-film adaptation of John Fowles's book. In addition to the Victorian love story of the book, Pinter creates a present-day background story that shows a love affair between the main actors.

The Muppet Movie begins with the Muppets sitting down in a theater to watch the eponymous movie, which Kermit the Frog claims to be a semi-biographical account of how they all met.

In Buster Keaton's Sherlock Jr., a projectionist walks into a film while it is playing in a cinema, as does the main character in the Arnold Schwarzenegger film The Last Action Hero. A similar device is used in the music video for the song "Take On Me" by A-ha, which features a woman entering a pencil sketch. Conversely, Woody Allen's The Purple Rose of Cairo is about a film character exiting the film to interact with the real world. Allen's earlier film Play it Again, Sam featured liberal use of characters, dialogue and clips from the film classic Casablanca as a central device.

The 2002 Pedro Almodóvar film Talk to Her (Hable con ella) has the chief character Benigno tell a story called The Shrinking Lover to Alicia, a long-term comatose patient whom Benigno, a male nurse, is assigned to care for. The film presents The Shrinking Lover in the form of a black-and-white silent melodrama. To prove his love to a scientist girlfriend, The Shrinking Lover protagonist drinks a potion that makes him progressively smaller. The resulting seven-minute scene, which is readily intelligible and enjoyable as a stand-alone short subject, is considerably more overtly comic than the rest of Talk to Her—the protagonist climbs giant breasts as if they were rock formations and even ventures his way inside a (compared to him) gigantic vagina. Critics have noted that The Shrinking Lover essentially is a sex metaphor. Later in Talk to Her, the comatose Alicia is discovered to be pregnant and Benigno is sentenced to jail for rape. The Shrinking Lover was named Best Scene of 2002 in the Skandies, an annual survey of online cinephiles and critics invited each year by critic Mike D'Angelo.

Tropic Thunder (2008) is a comedy film revolving around a group of prima donna actors making a Vietnam War film (itself also named Tropic Thunder) when their fed-up writer and director decide to abandon them in the middle of the jungle, forcing them to fight their way out. The concept was perhaps inspired by the 1986 comedy Three Amigos, where three washed-up silent film stars are expected to live out a real-life version of their old hit movies. The same idea of life being forced to imitate art is also reprised in the Star Trek parody Galaxy Quest.

The first episode of the anime series The Melancholy of Haruhi Suzumiya consists almost entirely of a poorly made film that the protagonists created, complete with Kyon's typical, sarcastic commentary.

Chuck Jones's 1953 cartoon Duck Amuck shows Daffy Duck trapped in a cartoon that an unseen animator repeatedly manipulates. At the end, it is revealed that the whole cartoon was being controlled by Bugs Bunny. The Duck Amuck plot was essentially replicated in one of Jones' later cartoons, Rabbit Rampage (1955), in which Bugs Bunny turns out to be the victim of the sadistic animator (Elmer Fudd). A similar plot was also included in an episode of New Looney Tunes, in which Bugs is the victim, Daffy is the animator, and it was made on a computer instead of a pencil and paper. In 2007, the Duck Amuck sequence was parodied on Drawn Together ("Nipple Ring-Ring Goes to Foster Care").

All feature-length films by Jörg Buttgereit except Schramm feature a film within the film. In Nekromantik, the protagonist goes to the cinema to see the fictional slasher film Vera. In Der Todesking, one of the character watches a video of the fictional Nazi exploitation film Vera – Todesengel der Gestapo and in Nekromantik 2, the characters go to see a film called Mon déjeuner avec Vera, which is a parody of Louis Malle's My Dinner with André.

Quentin Tarantino's Inglourious Basterds depicts a Nazi propaganda film called Nation's Pride, which glorifies a soldier in the German army. Nation's Pride is directed by Eli Roth.

Joe Dante's Matinee depicts Mant, an early-1960s sci-fi/horror movie about a man who turns into an ant. In one scene, the protagonists see a Disney-style family movie called The Shook-Up Shopping Cart.

==== Story within a film ====
The 2002 martial arts epic Hero presented the same narrative several different times, as recounted by different storytellers, but with both factual and aesthetic differences. Similarly, in the whimsical 1988 Terry Gilliam film The Adventures of Baron Munchausen, and the 2003 Tim Burton film Big Fish, the bulk of the film is a series of stories told by an (extremely) unreliable narrator. In the 2006 Tarsem film The Fall, an injured silent-movie stuntman tells heroic fantasy stories to a little girl with a broken arm to pass time in the hospital, which the film visualizes and presents with the stuntman's voice becoming voiceover narration. The fantasy tale bleeds back into and comments on the film's "present-tense" story. There are often incongruities based on the fact that the stuntman is an American and the girl Persian—the stuntman's voiceover refers to "Indians", "a squaw" and "a teepee", but the visuals show a Bollywood-style devi and a Taj Mahal-like castle. The same conceit of an unreliable narrator was used to very different effect in the 1995 crime drama The Usual Suspects (which garnered an Oscar for Kevin Spacey's performance).

Walt Disney's 1946 live-action drama film Song of the South has three animated sequences, all based on the Br'er Rabbit stories, told as moral fables by Uncle Remus (James Baskett) to seven-year-old Johnny (Bobby Driscoll) and his friends Ginny (Luana Patten) and Toby (Glenn Leedy).

The seminal 1950 Japanese film Rashomon, based on the Japanese short story "In a Grove" (1921), utilizes the flashback-within-a-flashback technique. The story unfolds in flashback as the four witnesses in the story—the bandit, the murdered samurai, his wife, and the nameless woodcutter—recount the events of one afternoon in a grove. But it is also a flashback within a flashback, because the accounts of the witnesses are being retold by a woodcutter and a priest to a ribald commoner as they wait out a rainstorm in a ruined gatehouse.

The film Inception has a deeply nested structure that is itself part of the setting, as the characters travel deeper and deeper into layers of dreams within dreams. Similarly, in the beginning of the music video for the Michael Jackson song "Thriller", the heroine is terrorized by her monster boyfriend in what turns out to be a film within a dream. The film The Grand Budapest Hotel has four layers of narration: starting with a young girl at the author's memorial reading his book, it cuts to the old author in 1985 telling of an incident in 1968 when he, as a young author, stayed at the hotel and met the owner, old Zero. He was then told the story of young Zero and M. Gustave, from 1932, which makes up most of the narrative. Then in 2025, The film Dog Man is a film in a comic for the Dog Man series.

==== Play within a film ====
The 2001 film Moulin Rouge! features a fictitious musical within a film, called "Spectacular Spectacular". The 1942 Ernst Lubitsch comedy To Be or Not to Be confuses the audience in the opening scenes with a play, "The Naughty Nazis", about Adolf Hitler which appears to be taking place within the actual plot of the film. Thereafter, the acting company players serve as the protagonists of the film and frequently use acting/costumes to deceive various characters in the film. Hamlet also serves as an important throughline in the film, as suggested by the title. Laurence Olivier sets the opening scene of his 1944 film of Henry V in the tiring room of the old Globe Theatre as the actors prepare for their roles on stage. The early part of the film follows the actors in these "stage" performances and only later does the action almost imperceptibly expand to the full realism of the Battle of Agincourt. By way of increasingly more artificial sets (based on mediaeval paintings) the film finally returns to The Globe.

Mel Brooks' film The Producers revolves around a scheme to make money by producing a disastrously bad Broadway musical, Springtime for Hitler. Ironically the film itself was later made into its own Broadway musical (although a more intentionally successful one). The Outkast music video for the song "Roses" is a short film about a high school musical. In Diary of a Wimpy Kid, the middle-schoolers put on a play of The Wizard of Oz, while High School Musical is a romantic comedy about the eponymous musical itself. A high school production is also featured in the gay teen romantic comedy Love, Simon.

A 2012 Italian film, Caesar Must Die, stars real-life Italian prisoners who rehearse Shakespeare's Julius Caesar in Rebibbia prison playing fictional Italian prisoners rehearsing the same play in the same prison. In addition, the film itself becomes a Julius Caesar adaption of sorts as the scenes are frequently acted all around the prison, outside of rehearsals, and the prison life becomes indistinguishable from the play.

The main plot device in Repo! The Genetic Opera is an opera which is going to be held the night of the events of the film. All of the principal characters of the film play a role in the opera, though the audience watching the opera is unaware that some of the events portrayed are more than drama. The 1990 biopic Korczak, about the last days of a Jewish children's orphanage in Nazi occupied Poland, features an amateur production of Rabindranath Tagore's The Post Office, which was selected by the orphanage's visionary leader as a way of preparing his charges for their own impending death. That same production is also featured in the stage play Korczak's Children, also inspired by the same historical events.

==== TV show within a film ====
The 1973 film The National Health, an adaptation of the 1969 play The National Health by Peter Nichols, features a send-up of a typical American hospital soap opera being shown on a television situated in an underfunded, unmistakably British NHS hospital.

The Jim Carrey film The Truman Show is about a person who grows to adulthood without ever realizing that he is the unwitting hero of the immersive eponymous television show.

In Toy Story 2, the lead character Woody learns that he is based on the lead character of the same name of a 1950s Western show known as Woody's Roundup, which was seemingly cancelled due to the rise of science fiction, though this is eventually debunked after the final episode of the show can be seen playing.

=== Nested video games ===
The first example of a video game within a video game is almost certainly Tim Stryker's 1980s era text-only game Fazuul (also the world's first online multiplayer game), in which one of the objects that the player can create is a minigame. Another early use of this trope was in Cliff Johnson's 1987 hit The Fool's Errand, a thematically linked narrative puzzle game, in which several of the puzzles were semi-independent games played against NPCs.

Power Factor has been cited as a rare example of a video game in which the entire concept is a video game within a video game: The player takes on the role of a character who is playing a "Virtual Reality Simulator", in which he in turn takes on the role of the hero Redd Ace. The .hack franchise also gives the concept a central role. It features a narrative in which internet advancements have created an MMORPG franchise called The World. Protagonists Kite and Haseo try to uncover the mysteries of the events surrounding The World. Characters in .hack are aware that they are video game characters.

More commonly, however, the video game within a video game device takes the form of mini-games that are non-plot-oriented, and optional to the completion of the game. For example, in the Yakuza and Shenmue franchises, there are playable arcade machines featuring other Sega games that are scattered throughout the game world.

In Final Fantasy VII there are several video games that can be played in an arcade in the Gold Saucer theme park. In Animal Crossing, the player can acquire individual NES emulations through various means and place them within their house, where they are playable in their entirety. When placed in the house, the games take the form of a Nintendo Entertainment System. In Fallout 4 and Fallout 76, the protagonist can find several cartridges throughout the wasteland that can be played on their pip-boy (an electronic device that exists only in the world of the game) or any terminal computer. In Celeste, there is a hidden room in which the protagonist can play the original PICO-8 prototype of the game.

==== TV show within a video game ====
In the Remedy video game titled Max Payne, players can chance upon a number of ongoing television shows when activating or happening upon various television sets within the game environs, depending on where they are within the unfolding game narrative. Among them are Lords & Ladies, Captain Baseball Bat Boy, Dick Justice and the pinnacle television serial Address Unknown – heavily inspired by David Lynch-style film narrative, particularly Twin Peaks, Address Unknown sometimes prophesies events or character motives yet to occur in the Max Payne narrative.

In Grand Theft Auto IV, the player can watch several TV channels which include many programs: reality shows, cartoons, and even game shows.

=== Nested TV shows ===
Terrance & Phillip from South Park comments on the levels of violence and acceptable behaviour in the media and allow criticism of the outer cartoon to be addressed in the cartoon itself. Similarly, on the long running animated sitcom The Simpsons, Bart's favorite cartoon, Itchy and Scratchy (based on the series Herman and Katnip, a parody of Tom & Jerry), often echoes the plotlines of the main show. The Simpsons also parodied this structure with numerous 'layers' of sub-stories in the Season 17 episode "The Seemingly Never-Ending Story".

The animated series SpongeBob SquarePants features numerous fictional shows, most notably, The Adventures of Mermaid Man and Barnacle Boy, which stars the titular elderly superheroes Mermaid Man (Ernest Borgnine) and Barnacle Boy (Tim Conway).

On the show Dear White People, the Scandal parody Defamation offers an ironic commentary on the main show's theme of interracial relationships. Similarly, each season of the HBO show Insecure has featured a different fictional show, including the slavery-era soap opera Due North, the rebooted black 1990s sitcom Kev'yn, and the investigative documentary series Looking for LaToya.

The Irish television series Father Ted features a television show, Father Ben, which has characters and storylines almost identical to that of Father Ted.

The television shows 30 Rock, Studio 60 on the Sunset Strip, Sonny with a Chance, and Kappa Mikey feature a sketch show within the TV show.

An extended plotline on the semi-autobiographical sitcom Seinfeld dealt with the main characters developing a sitcom about their lives. The gag was reprised on Curb Your Enthusiasm, another semi-autobiographical show by and about Seinfeld co-creator Larry David, when the long-anticipated Seinfeld reunion was staged entirely inside the new show.

The "USS Callister" episode of the Black Mirror anthology television series is about a man who is obsessed with a Star Trek-like show and recreates it as part of a virtual reality game.

The concept of a film within a television series is employed in the Macross universe. The Super Dimension Fortress Macross: Do You Remember Love? (1984) was originally intended as an alternative theatrical re-telling of the television series The Super Dimension Fortress Macross (1982), but was later "retconned" into the Macross canon as a popular film within the television series Macross 7 (1994).

The Stargate SG-1 episode "Wormhole X-Treme!" features a fictional TV show with an almost identical premise to Stargate SG-1. A later episode, "200", depicts ideas for a possible reboot of Wormhole X-Treme!, including using a "younger and edgier" cast, or even Thunderbirds-style puppets.

The Glee episode "Extraordinary Merry Christmas" features the members of New Directions starring in a black-and-white Christmas television special that is presented within the episode itself. The special is a homage to both Star Wars Holiday Special and the "Judy Garland Christmas Special".

The British TV series Don't Hug Me I'm Scared, based on the web series Don't Hug Me I'm Scared, is notable for being a puppet show that includes a fictional claymation TV series within the show: Grolton & Hovris, a parody of Wallace and Gromit.

==== Film within a TV show ====
Seinfeld had a number of reoccurring fictional films, including a sci-fi film called The Flaming Globes of Sigmund and, most notably, Rochelle, Rochelle, a parody of artsy but exploitative foreign films. The trippy, metaphysically loopy thriller Death Castle is a central element of the Master of None episode "New York, I Love You".

The series finale of Barry features a biopic of the titular character which was called The Mask Collector, and its production served as the catalyst for the last 4 episodes of Barry's final season.

== Fantasy within realism ==
Stories inside stories can allow for genre changes. Arthur Ransome uses the device to let his young characters in the Swallows and Amazons series of children's books, set in the recognisable everyday world, take part in fantastic adventures of piracy in distant lands: two of the twelve books, Peter Duck and Missee Lee (and some would include Great Northern? as a third), are adventures supposedly made up by the characters. Similarly, the film version of Chitty Chitty Bang Bang uses a story within a story format to tell a purely fantastic fairy tale within a relatively more realistic frame-story. The film version of The Wizard of Oz does the same thing by making its inner story into a dream. Lewis Carroll's celebrated Alice books use the same device of a dream as an excuse for fantasy, while Carroll's less well-known Sylvie and Bruno subverts the trope by allowing the dream figures to enter and interact with the "real" world. In each episode of Mister Rogers' Neighborhood, the main story was realistic fiction, with live action human characters, while an inner story took place in the Neighborhood of Make-Believe, in which most characters were puppets, except Lady Aberlin and occasionally Mr. McFeely, played by Betty Aberlin and David Newell in both realms.

== Fractal fiction ==
Some stories feature what might be called a literary version of the Droste effect, where an image contains a smaller version of itself (also a common feature in many fractals). An early version is found in an ancient Chinese proverb, in which an old monk situated in a temple found on a high mountain recursively tells the same story to a younger monk about an old monk who tells a younger monk a story regarding an old monk sitting in a temple located on a high mountain, and so on. The same concept is at the heart of Michael Ende's classic children's novel The Neverending Story, which prominently features a book of the same title. This is later revealed to be the same book the audience is reading, when it begins to be retold again from the beginning, thus creating an infinite regression that features as a plot element. Another story that includes versions of itself is Neil Gaiman's The Sandman: Worlds' End which contains several instances of multiple storytelling levels, including Cerements (issue #55) where one of the inmost levels corresponds to one of the outer levels, turning the story-within-a-story structure into an infinite regression. Jesse Ball's The Way Through Doors features a deeply nested set of stories within stories, most of which explore alternate versions of the main characters. The frame device is that the main character is telling stories to a woman in a coma (similar to Almodóvar's Talk to Her, mentioned above).

Richard Adams's classic Watership Down includes several memorable tales about the legendary prince of rabbits, El-Ahraira, as told by master storyteller, Dandelion.

Samuel Delany's great surrealist sci-fi classic Dhalgren features the main character discovering a diary apparently written by a version of himself, with incidents that usually reflect, but sometimes contrast with the main narrative. The last section of the book is taken up entirely by journal entries, about which readers must choose whether to take as completing the narrator's own story. Similarly, in Kiese Laymon's Long Division, the main character discovers a book, also called Long Division, featuring what appears to be himself, except as living twenty years earlier. The title book in Charles Yu's How to Live Safely in a Science Fictional Universe exists within itself as a stable creation of a closed loop in time. Likewise, in the Will Ferrell comedy Stranger than Fiction the main character discovers he is a character in a book that (along with its author) also exists in the same universe. The 1979 book Gödel, Escher, Bach by Douglas Hofstadter includes a narrative between Achilles and the Tortoise (characters borrowed from Lewis Carroll, who in turn borrowed them from Zeno), and within this story they find the book "Provocative Adventures of Achilles and the Tortoise Taking Place in Sundry Spots of the Globe", which they begin to read, the Tortoise taking the part of the Tortoise, and Achilles taking the part of Achilles. Within this self-referential narrative, the two characters find the book "Provocative Adventures of Achilles and the Tortoise Taking Place in Sundry Spots of the Globe", which they begin to read, this time each taking the other's part. The 1979 experimental novel If on a winter's night a traveler by Italo Calvino follows a reader, addressed in the second person, trying to read the very same book, but being interrupted by ten other recursively nested incomplete stories.

Robert Altman's satirical Hollywood noir The Player ends with the antihero being pitched a movie version of his own story, complete with an unlikely happy ending. The long-running musical A Chorus Line dramatizes its own creation, and the life stories of its own original cast members. The famous final number does double duty as the showstopper for both the musical the audience is watching and the one the characters are appearing in. Austin Powers in Goldmember begins with an action film opening, which turns out to be a sequence being filmed by Steven Spielberg. Near the ending, the events of the film itself are revealed to be a movie being enjoyed by the characters. Jim Henson's The Muppet Movie is framed as a screening of the movie itself, and the screenplay for the movie is present inside the movie, which ends with an abstracted, abbreviated re-staging of its own events. The 1985 Tim Burton film Pee-Wee's Big Adventure ends with the main characters watching a film version of their own adventures, but as reimagined as a Hollywood blockbuster action film, with James Brolin as a more stereotypically manly version of the Paul Reubens title character. Episode 14 of the anime series Martian Successor Nadesico is essentially a clip show, but has several newly animated segments based on Gekigangar III, an anime that exists within its universe and that many characters are fans of, that involves the characters of that show watching Nadesico. The episode ends with the crew of the Nadesico watching the very same episode of Gekigangar, causing a paradox. Mel Brooks's 1974 comedy Blazing Saddles leaves its Western setting when the climactic fight scene breaks out, revealing the setting to have been a set in the Warner Bros. studio lot; the fight spills out onto an adjacent musical set, then into the studio canteen, and finally onto the streets. The two protagonists arrive at Grauman's Chinese Theatre, which is showing the "premiere" of Blazing Saddles; they enter the cinema to watch the conclusion of their own film. Brooks recycled the gag in his 1987 Star Wars parody, Spaceballs, where the villains are able to locate the heroes by watching a copy of the movie they are in on VHS video tape (a comic exaggeration of the phenomenon of films being available on video before their theatrical release). Brooks also made the 1976 parody Silent Movie about a buffoonish team of filmmakers trying to make the first Hollywood silent film in forty years—which is essentially that film itself (another forty years later, life imitated art imitating art, when an actual modern silent movie became a hit, the Oscar winner The Artist).

The film-within-a-film format is used in the Scream horror series. In Scream 2, the opening scene takes place in a movie theater where a screening of Stab is played which depicts the events from the first film. In between the events of Scream 2 and Scream 3, a second film was released called Stab 2. Scream 3 is about the actors filming a fictional third installment in the Stab series. The actors playing the trilogy's characters end up getting killed, much in the same way as the characters they are playing on screen and in the same order. In between the events of Scream 3 and Scream 4, four other Stab films are released. In the opening sequence of Scream 4 two characters are watching Stab 7 before they get killed. There's also a party in which all seven Stab movies were going to be shown. References are also made to Stab 5 involving time travel as a plot device. In the fifth installment of the series, also named Scream, an eighth Stab film is mentioned having been released before the film takes place. The characters in the film, several of which are fans of the series, heavily criticize the film, similar to how Scream 4 was criticized. Additionally, late in the film, Mindy watches the first Stab by herself. During the depiction of Ghostface sneaking up behind Randy on the couch from the first film in Stab, Ghostface sneaks up on Mindy and attacks and stabs her.

Director Spike Jonze's Adaptation is a fictionalized version of screenwriter Charlie Kaufman's struggles to adapt the non-cinematic book The Orchid Thief into a Hollywood blockbuster. As his onscreen self succumbs to the temptation to commercialize the narrative, Kaufman incorporates those techniques into the script, including tropes such as an invented romance, a car chase, a drug-running sequence, and an imaginary identical twin for the protagonist. (The movie also features scenes about the making of Being John Malkovich, previously written by Kaufman and directed by Jonze.) Similarly, in Kaufman's self-directed 2008 film Synecdoche, New York, the main character Caden Cotard is a skilled director of plays who receives a grant, and ends up creating a remarkable theater piece intended as a carbon copy of the outside world. The layers of copies of the world ends up several layers deep. The same conceit was previously used by frequent Kaufman collaborator Michel Gondry in his music video for the Björk song "Bachelorette", which features a musical that is about, in part, the creation of that musical. A mini-theater and small audience appear on stage to watch the musical-within-a-musical, and at some point, within that second musical a yet-smaller theater and audience appear.

Fractal fiction is sometimes utilized in video games to play with the concept of player choice: In the first chapter of Stories Untold, the player is required to play a text adventure, which eventually becomes apparent to be happening in the same environment the player is in; in Superhot the narrative itself is constructed around the player playing a game called Superhot.

== From story within a story to separate story ==
Occasionally, a story within a story becomes such a popular element that the producer(s) decide to develop it autonomously as a separate and distinct work. This is an example of a spin-off. Such spin-offs may be produced as a way of providing additional information on the fictional world for fans.

In Homestuck by Andrew Hussie, there is a comic called Sweet Bro and Hella Jeff, created by one of the characters, Dave Strider. It was later adapted to its own ongoing series.

In the Toy Story film universe, Buzz Lightyear is an animated toy action figure, which was based on a fictitious cartoon series, Buzz Lightyear of Star Command, which did not exist in the real world except for snippets seen within Toy Story. Later, Buzz Lightyear of Star Command was produced in the real world and was itself later joined by Lightyear, a film described as the source material for the toy and cartoon series.

Kujibiki Unbalance, a series in the Genshiken universe, has spawned merchandise of its own, and been remade into a series on its own.

The popular Dog Man series of children's graphic novels is presented as a creation of the main characters of author Dav Pilkey's earlier series, Captain Underpants.

In the animated online franchise Homestar Runner, many of the best-known features were spun off from each other. The best known was "Strong Bad Emails", which depicted the villain of the original story giving snarky answers to fan emails, but that in turn spawned several other long-running features which started out as figments of Strong Bad's imagination, including the teen-oriented cartoon parody "Teen Girl Squad" and the anime parody "20X6".

In the Harry Potter series, three such supplemental books have been produced: Fantastic Beasts and Where to Find Them, a guidebook used by the characters; Quidditch Through the Ages, a book from the school library; and The Tales of Beedle the Bard, presenting fairy tales told to children of the wizarding world.

In the works of Kurt Vonnegut, Kilgore Trout has written a novel called Venus on the Half-Shell. In 1975 real-world author Philip José Farmer wrote a science-fiction novel called Venus on the Half-Shell, published under the name Kilgore Trout.

Captain Proton: Defender of the Earth, a story by Dean Wesley Smith, was adapted from the holonovel Captain Proton in the Star Trek universe.

One unique example is the Tyler Perry comedy/horror hit Boo! A Madea Halloween, which originated as a parody of Tyler Perry films in the Chris Rock film Top 5.

== See also ==
- List of films featuring fictional films
- Metafiction – Genre of fiction about fiction
- Parallel novel – Pastiche novel with in-universe continuity
- Subplot – Secondary strand of a narrative plot
- Hypodiegetic narrative
