= Nekronology =

Studio album by Hermann Kopp
- Released: October 2004 (Red Stream Records); July 2009 (Aesthetic Records)
- Recorded: 1987–1999
- Genre: Soundtrack
- Length: 44:06
- Label: Red Stream Records (CD) / Aesthetic Records (Vinyl)
- Producer: Hermann Kopp

Nekronology is an album by the German avant-garde/experimental musician Hermann Kopp. It was released in October 2004 as a CD and in July 2009 as a vinyl LP, with a different artwork. The album is a compilation of Kopp's soundtracks to the German films Nekromantik, Der Todesking and Nekromantik 2 by the film director Jörg Buttgereit, completed by two bonus tracks.

== Track listing ==
1. "The Loving Dead" – 1:16
2. "Poison" – 3:57
3. "Supper" – 1:46
4. "Fish In A Bowl" – 3:03
5. "Petrified Slow" – 1:24
6. "Betty’s Return" – 2:21
7. "Unholy" – 5:36
8. "Surprise" – 3:37
9. "Home (Domestic Version)" – 2:36
10. "Vanish" – 4:08
11. "Supersonic Tonic" – 2:35
12. "Man Drowning Himself In Bathtub" – 2:54
13. "Zwi Sabattai" – 5:21
14. "Drunk" – 3:39
