= A Private Cosmos =

1968 novel by Philip José Farmer

- Author: Philip José Farmer
- Cover artist: Jack Gaughan
- Language: English
- Genre: Science fiction
- Publisher: Ace Books
- Publication date: 1968
- Publication place: United States
- Media type: Print
- OCLC: 619720
- Preceded by: The Gates of Creation
- Followed by: Behind the Walls of Terra

A Private Cosmos (1968) is a science fiction novel by American author Philip José Farmer. It is the third in his World of Tiers series.

== Premise ==
Kickaha. Jadawin and his wife have disappeared, leaving the World of Tiers threatened by invasion and chaos. Human bodies taken over by Lord minds are pouring through uncharted gates. They seek two things: domination of every private cosmos, and the death of the Trickster, who knows too much.
