= Nekromantik 2 =

1991 German horror exploitation film by Jörg Buttgereit

Nekromantik 2: Die Rückkehr der Liebenden Toten
- German film poster for Nekromantik 2
- Directed by: Jörg Buttgereit
- Screenplay by: Jörg Buttgereit; Franz Rodenkirchen
- Produced by: Manfred O. Jelinski
- Starring: Monika M.; Mark Reeder; Carola Ewers; Astrid Ewers
- Cinematography: Manfred O. Jelinski
- Edited by: Jörg Buttgereit; Manfred O. Jelinski
- Music by: Hermann Kopp; Peter Kowalski; Daktari Lorenz; Monika M.; Mark Reeder; John Boy Walton
- Production companies: Jelinski Film & Fernsehproduktion
- Release date: 1991
- Running time: 111 minutes
- Country: Germany

Nekromantik 2: Die Rückkehr der Liebenden Toten (The Return of the Loving Dead) (stylized as NEKRomantik 2) is a 1991 German horror film directed by Jörg Buttgereit and a sequel to his 1988 film Nekromantik. The highly controversial film about necrophilia was seized by authorities in Munich 12 days after its release, an action that had no precedent in Germany since the Nazi era.

== Setting ==
The film is set in Berlin, shortly after the German reunification. The apartment of Monika is set in the former East Berlin, with exterior shots depicting a burnt-out Trabant and crumbling building façades, while other locations of the film, such as the meeting place of Mark and his friend, are set in the former West Berlin.

== Plot ==
Monika, a nurse with a necrophilia fetish, disinters the body of Rob Schmadtke in a church's graveyard. Rob had achieved infamy as a necrophiliac who had committed suicide by stabbing himself while masturbating. She takes the corpse to her apartment, where she undresses it and uses it to stimulate herself. Unable to orgasm, she vomits in the bathroom. Then she redresses Rob's body and takes photos with it.

Monika goes to see an art film. There she meets Mark, who has been stood up by a friend and offers Monika his extra ticket. Monika and Mark hit it off and soon go on a carnival date, after which point Monika decides to "break up" with Rob's corpse. She tearfully saws the corpse of Rob into pieces, puts them in garbage bags and returns them to his grave. However, she keeps his head and genitals, which Mark finds in Monika's refrigerator when he spends the night. This discovery, combined with Monika's desire to photograph Mark in positions that make him appear dead, plants doubts in his mind about the relationship.

Mark drops in unexpectedly at Monika's apartment and finds her watching a video of the dissection of a seal with other necrophilic friends. Mark is disgusted, and he and Monika fight. A few nights later, Monika invites Mark back to her place to discuss their relationship. She seduces him as soon as he arrives. As they have sex, she cuts his head off and replaces it with Rob's. She finally has an orgasm. Sometime later, a doctor congratulates Monika on her pregnancy.

== Soundtrack ==
The soundtrack, by Hermann Kopp, Daktari Lorenz, John Boy Walton and Peter Kowalski, is neither ironic nor campy, but rather is intended to generate genuine emotional response. The serious intent of the film in general is made clear in an interview in which Buttgereit discusses an audition in which actors performed the love scene with Rob's corpse: "Though they were all quite willing, none of them took it as seriously as we did."

== Production ==
The shooting of the film occurred in September and October 1990. The editing of the film was completed by April 1991. The film was shot in Berlin on 16 mm film. The film was originally planned to last 85 minutes, but the print shown at the Berlin premiere lasted 111 minutes. It was soon shortened to 104 minutes, after removing "unimportant bits and pieces" from various scenes. Reportedly, no scene of the film was completely removed. David Kerekes commented that it could stand to be further shortened, since several sequences were, in his view, protracted and tedious.

The film within a film in the movie theater scene is a parody of My Dinner with Andre (1981). In the original film, two men sit at a dinner table and philosophize for two hours. The parody film has a nude man and woman (Wolfgang Müller and Käthe Kruse) sitting outdoors, eating numerous boiled eggs and conversing on topics of ornithology. The parody film is shot in black-and-white, maintaining an authentic look for an art film. This sequence contains most of Nekromantik 2's dialogue. Buttgereit included this parody film as a tribute to a "fascinating piece of film making".

The role of Monika was not written with a specific actress in mind. The creators of the film placed an advertisement in a magazine, looking for a person for the role. There were about 40 applicants, but none was deemed satisfying. Eventually Franz Rodenkirchen recruited Monika M., a woman who he met by chance in a movie theater. He was initially impressed that this woman was a fan of Lucio Fulci films. He then observed her for a while, and liked the way she walked and expressed herself. He decided to approach her and offer her the role. According to Monika, she was already familiar with the name of Buttgereit, having already seen Der Todesking (1989).

The role of Mark required the actor Mark Reeder to smoke, but he had no intention to take up smoking for the sake of art. So, the creators revised the role to have Mark as a non-smoker.

== Critical response ==
According to Randall Halle, the film can be seen as a romance film with a twist.

While some accuse the Nekromantik films of being "little more than 'disappointingly witless' and 'morbidly titillating' attempts 'to disgust the most jaded conceivable audience'", there have been positive reviews as well. Film critic Christian Keßler writes that "Jörg Buttgereit is the only person in Germany who manages to dedicate himself to these darkest of subjects with this much charm". Literature and film critic Linnie Blake argues that these movies are not only more thematically complex and technically sophisticated than is popularly supposed, but share a set of artistic and ideological concerns more usually associated with the canonic authors of the Young German Cinema and the New German Cinema of the turbulent years of the 1960s and 1970s".

Kai-Uwe Werbeck writes that Nekromantik 2 is "a critical commentary on the status quo of Germany's postwar media politics." He argues that the film is more than an endurance test for fans of splatter films, with Buttgereit using the film to comment on media production in West Germany.

== Confiscation ==
In June 1991, Munich police confiscated the film, leading an interviewer to ask Buttgereit "How does it feel to be Germany's most wanted filmmaker?" Buttgereit responded: "I'm not sure how to feel. At the moment I'm afraid of a police raid. But I'm not really proud of it, if that's what you mean." The reason for the film's seizure was that it purportedly glorified violence. According to Buttgereit, "The thing that people find offensive about Nekromantik 2 is that it doesn't accuse Monika." At a different point in the interview, Buttgereit states, "It was very important to me that the audience is on Monika's side, even with her doing these terrible things." In 1993, however, the film was officially deemed "art", thanks to an exhaustive expert opinion by film scholar Knut Hickethier. However, Buttgereit says, "the big shops are still afraid to sell my DVDs."

The official charge against the film was that it was "glorifying violence". The police confiscated the print of the film shown in the Werkstattkino (Workshop Cinema) in Munich. Then the local prosecutor handed the print to the authorities of Berlin, which placed the film in the index for seized videos; videos which all known copies had to be confiscated, while the police started searching for the negatives. Being caught in possession of a copy was illegal in its own right. The confiscation was actually the fourth one to occur in the Werkstattkino over a period of two years. Starting in the mid-1970s, the movie theater had depicted many controversial films, including hardcore pornography, horror films and propaganda films dating to World War II. The censoring authorities in Munich seemed to have a particular grudge for the movie theater, which seems to have influenced the fate of Nekromantik 2. In July 1992, there was also a police raid in the residence of Manfred O. Jelinski, and the policemen confiscated anything remotely related to the banned film.

The film's banning was actually questionable, because no trial or hearing over the fate of the film had actually occurred. The confiscation and banning was based solely on the decisions of the censoring authorities.

== Release ==
The film premiered in June 1991 in Germany on VHS. Cult Epics released the film in a limited edition on February 10, 2015, on DVD and Blu-ray Disc in the United States. The Blu-ray featured extensive bonus features, including: a new introduction by Jörg, an audio commentary, trailers of Jörg Buttgereit's films, a "Making Of" documentary, still photo gallery, new short films by Jörg, and the score (original and live) of Nekromantik 2.

== Ban ==
The film is known to be currently banned in Australia since 1992 and New Zealand since 2007.

== Legacy ==
Buttgereit continued the story of Nekromantik 2 with artist Martin Trafford in a comic book. The comic was released on German label Weissblech Comics.

== Sources ==
- Halle, Randall (2003), "Unification Horror: Queer Desire and Uncanny Visions", in Halle, Randall (ed.), Light Motives: German Popular Film in Perspective, Wayne State University Press, ISBN 978-0814330456
- Kerekes, David (1998), "Nekromantik 2: the inhuman presentation of violence", Sex, Murder, Art: The Films of Jörg Buttgereit, Headpress, ISBN 978-0952328841
