= The Maker of Universes =

1965 novel by Philip José Farmer

Maker of the Universes
- First edition
- Author: Philip José Farmer
- Cover artist: Jack Gaughan
- Language: English
- Genre: Science fiction
- Publisher: Ace Books
- Publication date: December 10, 1965
- Publication place: United States
- Media type: Print
- Followed by: The Gates of Creation

The Maker of Universes (1965) is a science fiction novel by American author Philip José Farmer. It is the first in his World of Tiers series.

== Plot summary ==
The story follows Robert Wolff, a man disenchanted with his life and his marriage. One day, while looking at a new house, Wolff discovers a strange horn in the basement. Blowing the horn, Wolff is transported to a strange new world, the World of Tiers. Wolff finds himself initially in an edenic paradise known as Okeanos. This region is the first level of the planet, which contains a number of tiers like a wedding cake, separated by vast mountain ranges. The entire planet is ruled over by a cruel and mysterious lord named Jadawin, who created it. Okeanos consists of a beach, an ocean, and a small forest and is populated by nymph like humans who originated in and near ancient Greece. In this new world, Wolff regains his youth and vigor and falls in love with a local woman named Chryseis who lived in Troy at the time of the Trojan War.

When Chryseis is kidnapped, Wolff follows after her, climbing to the next level of the world, Amerind, a plains region populated by Native Americans and centaurs. Along the way he is joined by the adventurer Kickaha, who had also come from Earth, where he was known as Paul Janus Finnegan, some time ago. The two continue their adventure as they ascend the various levels of the World of Tiers including the medieval Dracheland and the jungle Atlantis. When they finally make it to the palace of Jadawin they make a shocking discovery; Robert Wolff is Lord Jadawin, who lost his memory after being defeated by another lord, and ended up stranded on Earth. At the end, Wolff/Jadawin is reunited with Chryseis and restored to his rightful place as ruler of the World of Tiers, his experiences as a human on Earth having tempered his previous cruelty.
