= The Gates of Creation =

1966 novel by Philip José Farmer

- Author: Philip José Farmer
- Cover artist: Gray Morrow
- Language: English
- Genre: Science fiction
- Publisher: Ace Books
- Publication date: 1966
- Publication place: United States
- Media type: Print
- Preceded by: The Maker of Universes
- Followed by: A Private Cosmos

The Gates of Creation (1966) is a science fiction novel by American author Philip José Farmer. It is the second in his World of Tiers series.

== Plot summary ==
A demigod disguised as an Earthman and Lord of the Planet of Many Levels, Wolff-Jadawin must enter the many-leveled universe constructed for his torment and destruction in order to save his bride from the satanic Master Lord Urizen.
