= Hermann Kopp =

German composer and musician

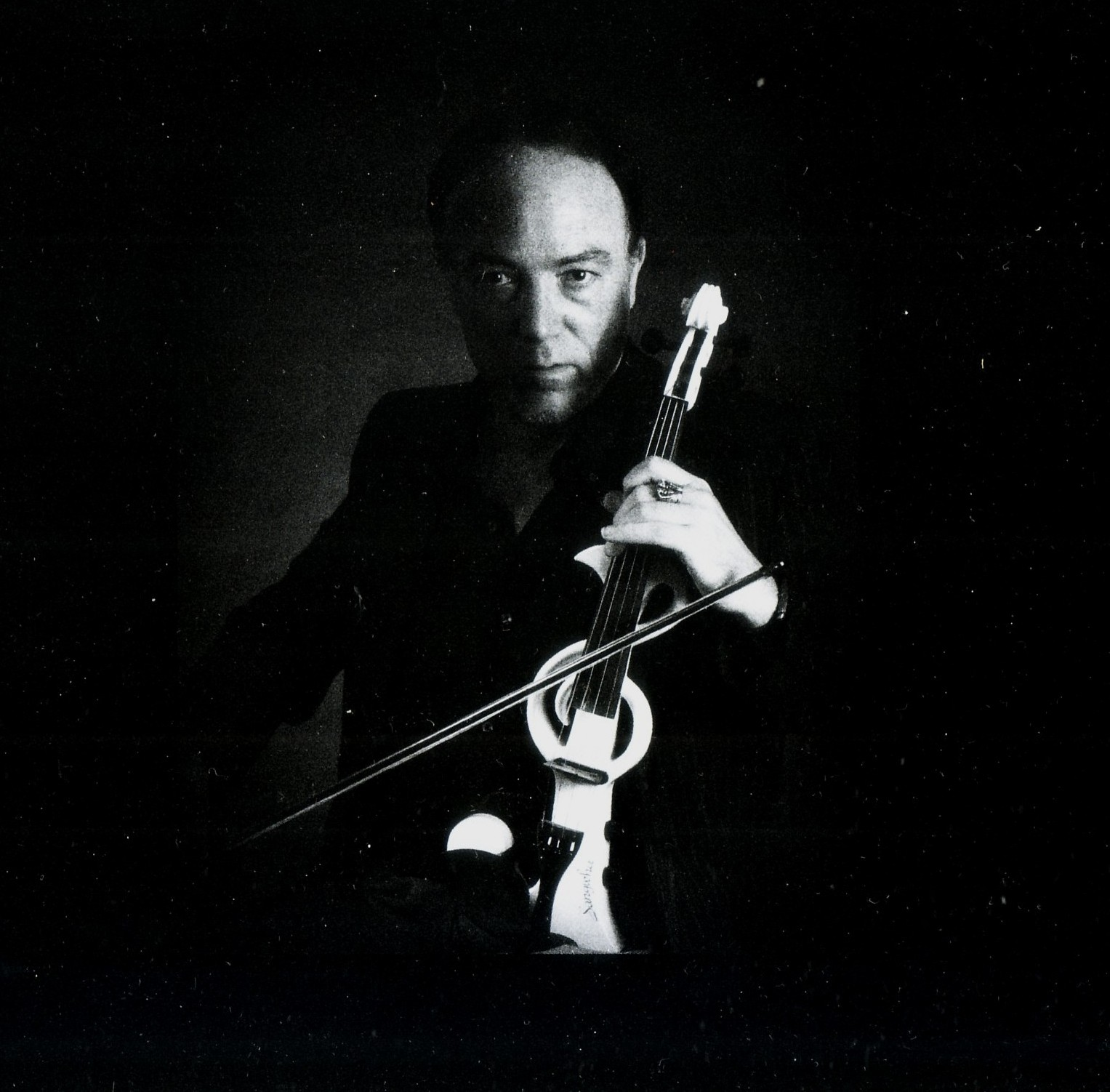
- Hermann Kopp
- Born: 21 August 1954 (age 70); Stuttgart, West Germany
- Occupation(s): musician, composer, actor
- Years active: 1981–1990, 2004-present

Hermann Kopp (born 21 August 1954, in Stuttgart) is a German composer and musician, presently living in Barcelona, Spain.

== Biography ==
In the early eighties, Kopp released two vinyl records with a sound that can be vaguely classified as electronic minimalism and then became a member of the German electro-industrial band Keine Ahnung with which he played live in Mannheim and Berlin. In 1987 he participated in the soundtrack of the German horror film Nekromantik, followed in 1989 by music to the movie Der Todesking and in 1990 to Nekromantik 2. Unlike the early song material that tends to be intimist and voluntarily drawing on the kitsch side, his film scores create uneasy and haunting atmospheres, weaving atonal strings, slow motion rhythms, moog synthesizers and plain noise into soundtrack form. In 2007, Hermann Kopp released “Psicofonico”, abstract violin soundscapes influenced by a Spanish documentary on the Electronic Voice Phenomena. In 2007 he got signed to the German label Galakthorrö, known for its releases of industrial music, maintaining his own morbid musical language. Cooperations with other musicians comprise the Italian artists Lorenzo Abattoir and Bathory Legion, the British act Am Not, the British doomcore band Fifth Era and the German project Schattenspiel.

Hermann Kopp has had releases on the following labels throughout his career:

- Passiv
- Red Stream
- Vinyl On Demand
- Bataille
- Galakthorrö
- Aesthetic Records
- 4iB Records
- Alien Passengers

== In Other Media ==
In the movie Der Todesking Hermann Kopp plays a part as a man drowning himself in his bathtub. His name in the film, Barsch, bears similarities with the German politician Uwe Barschel who was found dead around the same time in the bathtub of a hotel in Geneva, following a political scandal that became popular under the name of “Waterkantgate”.

== Soundtracks ==
- Nekromantik 1987
- Der Todesking 1989
- Nekromantik 2 1990
- The Queen Of Hollywood Boulevard 2017

== Selected discography ==
- "Aquaplaning in Venedig", Vinyl-EP 1981
- "Pop", Vinyl-LP, 1983
- "Japgirls in Synthesis", Vinyl-LP, 2004
- "Nekronology", CD, 2004, reissued on Vinyl in 2009
- "Kitsch", Vinyl-LP, 2004
- "Mondo Carnale", Vinyl-LP, 2005
- "Psicofonico", CD, 2007
- "Under A Demon's Mask", Vinyl and CD, 2008
- "Cerveau D'Enfant", Vinyl-EP, 2010
- "Zyanidanger", Vinyl and CD, 2013
- "Sinekdoxa", Tape, 2014
- "Cantos Y Llantos", Vinyl-EP, 2017
