= Red Orc's Rage =

1991 novel by Philip José Farmer

- Author: Philip José Farmer
- Language: English
- Genre: Science fiction
- Publication date: 1991
- Publication place: United States
- Media type: Print

Red Orc's Rage (1991) is a recursive science fiction novel by American writer Philip José Farmer, part of his World of Tiers series. The plot of the book was inspired by the work of American psychiatrist A. James Giannini, M.D, who used earlier books in Farmer's series as role-playing tools and aids to self-analysis. This technique was developed at Yale University and further expanded by Dr. Giannini at Ohio State University. The technique is properly called "projective psychotherapy". It involves immersing the patients in a fictional world which is accessible to the psychiatrist. It is subject to alternative interpretation but not to change. By utilizing a structured fantasy world the subconscious can be directly accessed without confronting resistances of the conscious mind.

This novel was written by Farmer in consultation with Dr. Giannini. It depicts a delusional adolescent boy who is treated with projective psychotherapy. In this case the works of fiction are the previously published novels in the "World of Tiers" series. Characters and locations are recursively introduced in the mind of the protagonist. He travels into the World of Tiers although it is never certain if he is delusional or has found a gateway to an alternative universe. The psychiatrist in the novel then analyzes this alternative reality rather than the world he shares with his patient. This delusion is prefabricated by Farmer and not subject to modification. In the "Afterword" section Dr. Giannini discusses the real-world application of this novel. It is a fictional work based on real-world therapy of actual patients. This fictional depiction of real-world therapeutic encounters with fiction worlds is then intended, once again, to be applied to real-world treatment.

== Plot ==
Jim Grimson is a troubled youth undergoing therapy in a psychiatric hospital who is encouraged to role-play Red Orc, a character in a science fiction novel. Jim finds himself actually transported to the fictional World of Tiers, entering the mind and body of the character he role-played in the hospital. In the World of Tiers Red Orc/Jim struggles with an abusive father, a situation mirroring his real-world problems.

The character has Oedipal issues with his father, an unemployed crane operator in the fictional "Belmont City", somewhere near Youngstown, Ohio. The steel mills are closing permanently and the family is facing a bleak economic future. Jim struggles with class-issues at his high-school. In academics, athletics, and student society he is a non-achiever, recapitulating his father's position in the adult world. His only outlets are science fiction, the fantasies invented by his grandfather and some bizarre hallucination which occasionally intrude into his world.

After a prank with an outhouse goes awry, Jim is arrested. He appears in court and is ordered to undergo a course of psychiatric evaluation and treatment in Wellington Hospital. While there he comes under the care of Dr. R. Lars Porsena. (This name is a play on "A. James Giannini". In most of Farmer's novels the protagonist's name or initials are a play on his or his collaborator's name). Dr. Porsena is also a science-fiction fan. After a conversation with Jim, he invites him to join a projective therapy group. This group is focusing on the "World of Tiers" series. After joining this group and participating in some sessions, Jim gains an insight. He realizes that hallucinations glimpsed prior to his admission are of the World of Tiers. Shortly afterwards he projects himself into the mind of the fictional lord, Red Orc.

Throughout the remainder of the novel, Jim has multiple adventures in this lord's mind. He wanders through a universe filled with Freudian symbols and Jungian archetypes. He learns that Red Orc's father, the appropriately named (qv. William Blake) "Los", fears his son and attempts to prevent him from becoming lord of Los's universe. He imprisons him and attempts to suffocate him with jewels. He exiles him to a world where escape can only be had through narrow tunnels guarded by hairy spiders. During these adventures Red Orc is separately seduced by his mother and aunt. He also has sex with twenty of his sisters. During many of these adventures he is assisted by "Ijim". Ijim, his alter-ego, may or may not exist. During his adventures he is able to ride the totemic "white steed".

While he is involved primarily in Red Orc's struggles, he must also deal with his own conflicts on earth. As a result of a frame-up Jim is almost expelled from the hospital and Dr. Porsena's position jeopardized. The conflict is resolved, in part, through insights Jim has gained while occupying the mind of Red Orc. During this time Ijim dies but Red Orc defeats Los and eats his testicles.

The novel ends with Jim being discharged from Wellesley Hospital. His family situation has improved. He realizes that Dr. Porsena knows more about the worlds of Red Orc than that which could be obtained through his own sessions or from the books. He also realizes that some things are ultimately unknowable.

=== Afterword ===
An afterword follows the text. This section is written by Dr. Giannini. It traces the origins of projective therapy and explains the technique. The utility of the World of Tiers for this purpose is discussed.

This novel follows many Western traditions. Like Dante Alighieri in the Divine Comedy Jim travels with a companion who is unable to complete the journey. He enters a place of terror and wonder where punishment awaits those who violate a specific code. The novel is also a Bildungsroman, a coming-of-age novel in the German literary tradition. The protagonist must complete a journey of self and undergo loss to achieve adulthood, The Oedipal implications are quite obvious. Finally, this science-fiction novel takes its inspiration from the works of the English poet William Blake. Most of the characters in the alternative universe are found in the poetry and prose of Blake. Indeed, Blake does make an appearance as a character in a later "Tiers" novel.
