= World of Tiers =

Science fiction novel series

World of Tiers series
- The Maker of Universes (1965); The Gates of Creation (1966); A Private Cosmos (1968); Behind the Walls of Terra (1970); The Lavalite World (1977); More Than Fire (1993); Red Orc's Rage (1991)
- Author: Philip José Farmer
- Country: USA
- Language: English
- Genre: Science fiction
- Published: 1965 - 1993
- No. of books: 7

The World of Tiers is a series of science fiction novels by American writer Philip José Farmer. They are set within a series of artificially constructed universes, created and ruled by decadent beings who are genetically identical to humans, but regard themselves as superior, and are the inheritors of an advanced technology they no longer understand. This technology enables the "Lords" (or "Thoans", as described by Farmer in his introduction to a role-playing video game) to create novel lifeforms, and also to prevent aging or disease, making them effectively immortal. Their technology also allows them to create small artificial universes (see pocket universe), and the planets and stars within them, and modify the physical laws (e.g., changing the behavior of gravity) to create unusual or interesting phenomena within these universes. Instantaneous travel within and between these universes is achieved by the use of "gates" which seem to function as teleportation devices, or as a means of creating wormholes between different regions of spacetime.

The overall series title comes from the main "pocket universe" featured in the books. This consists of a single planet with a green sky, shaped in the form of a huge stepped pyramid on five stages, with each stage being a disk or squat cylinder. A small star and a single moon orbit around this planet (thus, in this universe geocentrism is a correct description of astronomical reality). There are no other stars or astronomical bodies. This world was created by a Lord named Jadawin.

The overall storyline of the series follows the adventures of two people from Earth who independently discover gates into the World of Tiers. The earlier books focus on the character of Robert Wolff as he explores this world and tries to discover its secrets. From the third book onwards the action shifts to Paul Janus Finnegan (known as Kickaha, along with many other aliases), who is drawn into a battle between an ancient enemy of the Lords, and ultimately into the feuds between rival Lords as they try to take over each other's universes.

== Novels ==
The novels in the series are:

- The Maker of Universes (1965)
- The Gates of Creation (1966)
- A Private Cosmos (1968)
- Behind the Walls of Terra (1970)
- The Lavalite World (1977)
- More Than Fire (1993)

The novel Red Orc's Rage (1991) has marginal connections with the series. Although the main characters from the other books do not appear directly, this novel provides some background material on events and characters in the other novels.

== Setting ==
The broad setting of the novels is a series of artificially constructed universes. The majority of the stories take place on the world created by the Lord Jadawin. This planet consists of a series of cylindrical layers stacked one atop the other, to form an enormous, approximately conical tower (albeit much broader than it is tall). The top surfaces (levels or tiers) of each cylindrical monolith are densely inhabited, while the vertical sides of the monoliths act as enormous cliffs (30,000-100,000 feet / 9,000-30,000 metres high) which partially isolate the inhabitants of each tier from each other. These cliffs do provide some purchase for climbing, and many specialized creatures live on the cliff surfaces, so this isolation is not complete.

There is no diminution of atmosphere from one level to the next, due to Jadawin's manipulation of the local gravitational fields. The various tiers are populated with plants and animals creating different environments. Some of these were abducted from Earth throughout history, while many were created in Jadawin's biolabs. Many creatures have bodies created by Jadawin to replicate mythological creatures (e.g. merpeople, centaurs) implanted with the minds of abducted humans. The various inhabitants are immortal as far as physical aging is concerned, though they can be killed by most other means.

=== Structure and scale ===
The pocket universe in which the World of Tiers is located contains only three astronomical objects;

- Alofmethbin (the Thoan name for the World of Tiers)
- a single moon orbiting Alofmethbin
- a single tiny star, also orbiting Alofmethbin

==== Alofmethbin ====
..the surface area on all the levels of this planet, that is, the horizontal area on the tops of the monoliths, equaled the surface area of the watery bodies of Earth. This made the land area more than that of Earth's. In addition, the habitable areas on the verticalities of the monoliths were considerable. These alone probably equalled the land area of Earth's Africa. Moreover, there were immense subterranean territories, great caverns in vast networks that ran under the earth everywhere.

Excerpt from A Private Cosmos

The World of Tiers consists of a stack of cylindrical monoliths. The "tiers" of the title are habitable environments on the upper surface of each cylinder. The tiers are, in order from largest (bottom) to smallest (top):

- Okeanos – watery, Garden of Eden, populated by people abducted from ancient Greece.
- Amerind – prehistoric North America, populated by people abducted from North and Central America.
- Dracheland – medieval/Arthurian, populated by people from medieval Germany.
- Atlantis – was a major civilization, now ruins and jungle.
- Palace of Jadawin

and the monoliths on top of which the tiers are located are:

- Thayaphaeawoed (surmounted by the Amerind tier)
- Abharhploonta (surmounted by the Dracheland tier)
- Doozvillnavava (surmounted by the Atlantis tier)
- Idaquizzoorhruz (surmounted by the Palace of Jadawin)

The exact dimensions of the monoliths are not stated, and so they must be inferred from hints in the novels, such as the quote above. Unfortunately the various statements in the books seem to be inconsistent. For instance, the distance from the outer edge of the Amerind tier to the base of the monolith Abharhploonta is quoted as being 1500 miles (approximately 2400 km), while the surface area of the Amerind tier is quoted as being equal to that of North and South America combined (approximately 42 million square kilometers). From this information it can be inferred that the outer radius of the Amerind tier (and hence the radius of the monolith Thayaphaeawoed) is approximately 4000 km. The next tier down (Okeanos) consists of a circular ocean girdling the monolith Thayaphaeawoed, approximately 480 kilometers wide, and a circular beach and forest. The edge of the Okeanos tier is easily reached by foot from the beach in less than a day. It follows that the outer radius of the lowest (largest) tier of the planet is approximately 4500 km. This disagrees with the quote above, since, in order to have a surface area equal to that of the water surface of Earth, the world of tiers would require a radius of approximately 10,700 km.

Furthermore, the heights of the various monoliths are not consistent between novels. As one example, in the first novel of the series the monolith Idaquizzoorhruz is quoted as being 30,000 feet (approximately 10 km) tall, while in the third novel it is stated as being 100,000 feet (approximately 33 km) tall. These discrepancies may be explained by saying that the various characters initial estimates of the height of the monoliths are inaccurate, and become more accurate as they learn more about Alofmethbin.

In any case, while the overall shape of the planet is a conical stepped pyramid, it is clearly much broader (several thousand kilometers) than it is tall (around 100 km).

==== Moon ====
The single moon orbiting Alofmethbin is quoted as being approximately the same size as the planet Mars. The moon as seen from Alofmethbin is described as appearing two-and-a-half times bigger than Earth's Moon. If this refers to the moon's angular width, it can be inferred that the moon orbits Alofmethbin at a distance of approximately 300,000 km.

== Story and characters ==
=== Major characters ===
==== Robert Wolff/Lord Jadawin ====
Robert Wolff is a retired linguistics professor in his sixties. While inspecting a house to purchase and live in during retirement with his wife, a gate to the World of Tiers opens before him. He passes through this gate, arriving on the Okeanos level. There he regains his youth and health, due to the effects of drugs in the water supply provided by the Lord Jadawin. He meets and falls in love with Chryseis, and when she is kidnapped, he sets out to rescue her, ascending the various levels of the planet. Most of this journey is undertaken in the company of Paul Janus Finnegan, aka Kickaha. Wolff and Jadawin are the same person.

==== Paul Janus Finnegan/Kickaha ====
Paul Janus Finnegan was born in Indiana in 1918, and served in the American army during the Second World War, driving a tank. In the ruins of a museum in a small German town, he discovered a metal crescent made of an apparently indestructible metal, and kept it as a souvenir. This crescent proved to be one half of a gate to the World of Tiers, the other half belonging to a displaced Thoan who attempted to buy (and later, steal) the crescent from him. Finnegan interrupted the Thoan in the middle of entering the gate and accidentally activated the completed gate himself, ending up transported to the World of Tiers.

At the start of the first novel in the series, Finnegan has lived on the World of Tiers for approximately twenty-four years. In that time, he has learned many of the local languages, become extremely skilled at knife-throwing, archery, and other combat and outdoors survival skills, and lived under many assumed names and identities. In Dracheland, his identity is "Baron Horst von Horstman", whose coat of arms is a red jackass' head surmounting a fist with the middle finger extended. His favourite identity is that of Kickaha (meaning "trickster"), which he uses on the Amerind level.

Paul Janus Finnegan shares the initials of the author (PJF). This is also true of one of the main characters in the Riverworld series, Peter Jairus Frigate.

In The Lavalite World, Philip José Farmer strongly implies that Finnegan is the great grandson of Phileas Fogg, the hero of Jules Verne's Around the World in 80 Days.

==== Chryseis ====
Chryseis is a woman abducted from Earth by Jadawin, who has had her mind implanted into a new body created in Jadawin's biolabs. She claims to be the same Chryseis, daughter of Chryses, portrayed in the tale of the Trojan War. The body created for her by Jadawin is essentially human, except that her eyes are exceptionally large in proportion to her face (like a cat's eyes), her legs are exceptionally long, and her hair is tiger-striped.

==== Anana ====
Anana, also known as Anana the Bright, is a Thoan, sister of Jadawin. She is driven out of her own universe by an ancient enemy that threatens to destroy all the Thoans, and takes refuge in the World of Tiers where she meets Kickaha. She is initially arrogant and cruel, as most Thoans are, but is impressed by Kickaha's resourcefulness, and gradually becomes more sympathetic and humane as she falls in love with him.

==== Podarge ====
Podarge, a terrible and extremely dangerous harpy, whose fantastic winged body was created by Wolff during his former life as Lord Jadawin, and who was given the brain of an ancient Greek woman by Wolff/Jadawin, appears periodically as both an ally and foe in the World of Tiers series. Podarge and her huge air armada of giant green eagles (and many of the individuals in it), often play pivotal parts in this story. Podarge's face was based on that of Wolff/Jadawin's sister, Anana the Bright.

=== Storyline ===
The first book in the series opens with Robert Wolff finding a gate into the World of Tiers, which Kickaha opens in order to escape from creatures sent by the Lord of that world. Wolff enters the World of Tiers, arriving on the Okeanos level, and over the space of a few months regains his youth thanks to chemicals in the water and food. He meets Chryseis and falls in love with her, but she is captured by the same creatures who captured Kickaha. Wolff sets out to pursue them, climbing the monolith towards the second (Amerind) level of the planet. On the way he meets Kickaha again, and the two join forces to rescue Chryseis. Eventually they ascend all the levels of the planet and launch an attack on the Lord's palace. It is revealed that Wolff was actually the Lord, Jadawin, who created the World of Tiers, but that he was attacked by another Lord and marooned on Earth, where the shock of being in such primitive surroundings caused him to suffer amnesia.

In the second book, Wolff, now reinstalled as the Lord of the World of Tiers (but more humane and compassionate, after his amnesia erased the original Jadawin personality), enters a Universe constructed by his father, Urizen. Urizen has kidnapped Chryseis, and Wolff finds himself reunited with his brothers, sisters and cousins, all of whom must travel from one dangerous planet to another to escape.

The third book chronicles Kickaha's adventures while the events of the second book are occurring. He meets three dispossessed Lords (one of whom is Anana) who are fleeing an army led by the Black Bellers – artificial intelligences capable of taking over the bodies of human hosts. It is revealed that the civilization of the Thoans, including their understanding of the scientific principles behind their advanced technology, was destroyed during the war with the Black Bellers ten thousand years before. Since then the few remaining Black Bellers have been in hiding, waiting for an opportunity to rebuild their ranks and attempt to take over again. Kickaha and Anana are pursued across the Amerind level, as they attempt to escape and simultaneously counterattack the Black Bellers. Eventually they enter the Lord's palace and manage to kill all but one of the Bellers, who flees to Earth.

It is revealed that Earth is itself an artificial world constructed to be an exact replica of the Thoan's home world during the stone age, and allowed to develop as a social experiment. Earth's "pocket universe" extends only to the edges of the solar system; the rest of the visible universe is effectively a 3-D Trompe-l'œil on the walls of the pocket universe. It is strongly implied that this is all an exact copy of the Thoans' homeworld universe and that Thoa is itself artificial, but this question is not explored in the later novels.

The remaining books in the series follow Kickaha and Anana as they travel to Earth to kill the final Black Beller. The secret Lord of Earth, Red Orc, attempts to kill Kickaha and Anana despite their informing him that they simply want to kill the last Black Beller and will then leave peacefully. Eventually they manage to kill the Black Beller, but wind up in a battle between Red Orc and another Lord called Urthona. They are all gated to the Lavalite world, a planet that changes shape periodically like the wax in a lava lamp, and which was created by Urthona. The only gate out of this world is located in Urthona's palace, which floats over the surface of the planet. Finally they manage to return to the World of Tiers and go searching for Wolff and Chryseis who have disappeared.

The final book of the series takes place fifteen years later, Anana and Kickaha having been directed into a trap universe by Red Orc. They escape, but Kickaha is forced by Red Orc to go in search of an entrance to a universe he found ten thousand years earlier but has been unable to return to. Red Orc wants Kickaha to bring a fresh approach to the problem. This universe contains the last remaining databanks that preserve the technology of the Thoans and Red Orc plans to use this technology to conquer all the artificial universes. The story culminates with Kickaha defeating Red Orc in hand-to-hand combat, and returning to the World of Tiers to resume his adventuring trickster lifestyle.

== Literary references ==
The Jadawin family (or at least their names) are taken from William Blake's mythology. This mythology is referred to by the characters in the stories (mainly in The Gates of Creation, Red Orc's Rage, and More than Fire).

Many features of the world of tiers appear to be drawn from early cosmological ideas and mythologies. The structure of the world of tiers, with a central mountain or tower which the sun passes behind at night is equivalent to early Babylonian and Egyptian cosmological theories. The placement of the Lord's palace at the highest level of the world is reminiscent of the home of the gods atop Mount Olympus. The lord Jadawin uses intelligent ravens that roam across the world, observing, carrying messages, and reporting back to him, much like Odin in Norse mythology (See Hugin and Munin. Notice also the similarity in the names Odin and Jadawin.)

The moon of the world of tiers is modelled after Barsoom, from Edgar Rice Burroughs' novels, a homage which Farmer openly admits in the third book of the series.

The novels are at least in part a vehicle to represent mythological character archetypes. Robert Wolff is a heroic character who primarily overcomes obstacles by using strength (physical and mental) to confront the Thoans. By contrast, the character of Kickaha is a trickster, who avoids the affairs of the god-like Thoans wherever possible, and who survives and defeats his enemies by cunning, trickery and skill.

The central concept of the series is the existence of arrogant beings who possess awesome powers (as a result of technology) and use these powers to play the role of gods. They are able to travel from place to place almost instantaneously by using gates to teleport from one location or universe to another. This is extremely similar to several central concepts in the fictitious Stargate universe, although there is currently no suggestion that Stargate copied these ideas from the World of Tiers stories.

The overall setting: a family of feuding dimension hopping immortal lords, as well as the specific plot of the first book: wherein an amnesiac immortal lord must travel from Earth to another dimension to regain his powers, bears striking similarities to Roger Zelazny's Amber series. Indeed, Zelazny himself has acknowledged that in writing Nine Princes in Amber he drew inspiration from the World of Tiers.
