= Nekromantik =

1987 West German horror exploitation film by Jörg Buttgereit

- Film poster
- Directed by: Jörg Buttgereit
- Written by: Jörg Buttgereit; Franz Rodenkirchen
- Produced by: Manfred Jelinski
- Starring: Daktari Lorenz; Beatrice Manowski; Harald Lundt
- Cinematography: Uwe Bohrer
- Edited by: Jörg Buttgereit; Manfred O. Jelinski
- Music by: Hermann Kopp; Daktari Lorenz; John Boy Walton
- Distributed by: Leisure Time Features (US)
- Release dates: 1988 (West Germany); 1 November 2014 (UK)
- Running time: 75 minutes
- Country: West Germany
- Languages: German; English

Nekromantik (stylized as NEKRomantik) is a 1987 West German erotic exploitation horror film co-written and directed by Jörg Buttgereit. It is known to be frequently controversial, banned in a number of countries, and has become a cult film over the years due to its transgressive subject matter (including necrophilia) and audacious imagery.

== Plot ==
Robert Schmadtke is a troubled young man who works for a company that specialises in cleaning up public spaces after traffic accidents and other fatal incidents; a job which allows Robert to indulge in and explore his necrophilia fetishes, which are shared by his wife Betty. Their apartment is decorated with centerfolds featuring models, pictures of famed killers, and jars containing human parts, which are preserved in formaldehyde.

One day, the street cleaning agency is called to deal with the body of a man found dead in a lake. Robert becomes fascinated upon seeing the man's heavily decayed corpse, and secretly takes it home with him, whereupon he presents it as a gift for Betty. Excited, they both cut off the end of a broom handle, before sticking it onto the corpse's crotch and putting a condom over it, allowing Betty to use it as a makeshift phallus. Betty then commits necrophilia with the corpse.

The next day, Robert is confronted at work by his co-workers and ends up getting fired due to his habitual tardiness and the odour festering from the suit in his locker. He returns home and informs Betty of his termination, upon which she angrily chastises him before leaving and taking the corpse with her. Robert suffers an emotional breakdown and kills their pet cat, before bathing with its entrails.

Robert drinks some whiskey and takes some pills, before falling asleep and experiencing a dream of him being a partially decayed corpse, playing with a decayed severed head alongside a girl dressed in white. After waking up, it is nighttime, and Robert leaves his apartment to hire a gigolette. They go to a cemetery, where he hopes the environment will help satisfy his libido, but he fails to perform sexually. After the gigolette mocks him, he strangles her to death in a fit of rage and then has sex with her corpse. The next morning, Robert is startled by an old gravedigger who stumbles across them. Robert quickly grabs the gravedigger's shovel and decapitates him with it before fleeing back to his apartment, where he commits suicide by stabbing himself in the stomach, whilst simultaneously ejaculating. Some time later, an unseen figure in high heels is shown digging up Robert's grave.

== Cast ==
- Bernd Daktari Lorenz as Robert Schmadtke
- Beatrice Manowski as Betty
- Harald Lundt as Bruno
- Collosseo as Joe
- Christiane Baumgarten as Woman in Dream
- Harals Weis as Garden Victim
- Volker Hauptvogel as Man with Gun

== Production ==
This was the first feature-length film directed by Buttgereit who had previously only done featurettes in Super 8 format. Buttgereit and co-writer Franz Rodenkirchen conceived the basic concept of the film while discussing the relationship between love, sex, and death. The idea to connect an orgasm to the moment of death, somebody actually enjoying his own death, was part of their initial ideas.

The film was a no budget film, with inexpensive special effects. The film makes use of actual animal intestines and the eyeballs of pigs. The rabbit-related scene uses documentary-style footage of a professional rabbit breeder at work. The original musical score for the film was composed by Hermann Kopp, Bernd Daktari Lorenz and John Boy Walton.

== Analysis ==
According to Bartłomiej Paszylk, the film revealed its roots in amateur film techniques through the use of poor acting and inferior cinematography. What actually made it a "must-see" for horror fans were its taboo-breaking scenes and dwelling on filthy, disgusting subjects. According to Kris Vander Lugt, in terms of genre Nekromantik is a mix of elements from several genres: splatter film, "schlock" film, black comedy, exploitation film, and softcore pornography. The title itself implies a mix of death (necro-) and romance. The film then serves as both an ode to necrophilia and an attack on the perceptions of morality of the bourgeoisie.

Other than his hobby of collecting specimens from corpses, Rob is depicted as a typical member of the German working class. On the other hand, the company which employs him has fascist allusions in its naming and emblem. When Rob loses his job, his romance with Betty also ends. She berates him for his lack of both money and manliness. Then she abandons him, introducing the themes of emotional and financial impotence.

Several times in the film, the exterior of the apartment of Rob and Betty is depicted from a streetview. This unexceptional exterior is contrasted with the grotesque scenes taking place behind its walls. Linnie Blake argues this is an evocation of the uncanny in Freudian terms. Rob owns a miniature version of The Glass Man. Created in 1930 by Franz Tschackert, it was a life-sized model of a male figure with transparent skin, making visible the skeleton and several internal organs. The placement of this artifact, along with specimen jars in the apartment, makes it seem like a mad scientist's laboratory.

Linnie Blake finds it telling that the murderer of the young gardener is previously seen shooting at birds, and is so similar to characters from the Heimatfilms. This was an essentially conservative West German genre which depicted "morally unimpeachable family and community lives". She argues that Buttgereit both evokes and derides this genre, and by implication the culture which produced it. The supposedly upstanding member of society kills, hides a corpse, and then disappears from view, getting away with murder.

The film includes several occasions of a dream sequence, such as Rob's visions of a woman in white in a rural landscape. She transports a severed head in a box and later plays with it. The film within a film is a slasher film. While a knife-wielding killer traces his knife across a female victim, the desensitized audience of the movie theater seems bored. They kiss or fondle each other, they eat or talk during a misogynist torture scene, a testament to their lack of empathy. The suicide scene is a depiction of extreme masochism, but it also concludes the story of the character's sexual dysfunction, existential crisis, and social isolation. Rob is not only a person with a fetish of the dead, but one who constantly fails in his relationships with the living.

== Release ==
NEKRomantik defied the censorship standards of West Germany. Since 1984, all horror films released in West Germany have been edited to remove violent scenes, both in cinema release and video release (such as with the 1985 film Day of the Dead), while a total of 32 films were banned from release in any format, including The Texas Chain Saw Massacre (1974), Mother's Day (1980), and The Evil Dead (1981). The creators of Nekromantik did not submit the film for review by the Freiwillige Selbstkontrolle der Filmwirtschaft and made the film available exclusively to an adult audience.

== Reception ==
The film critics of Berlin were typically favourable to the film, commenting on its taboo-breaking, its artistic merit, and the quality of its special effects. A magazine article on Sex and Death in the Modern Gay Cinema perceived a film as an allegory for AIDS and the necessity of safe sex.

The film initially faced no significant reprisals. It was only the scandal over the sequel Nekromantik 2 (1991) which caused the German authorities to temporarily ban sales by mail order of the original film. John Waters proclaimed Nekromantik "the first ever erotic film for necrophiliacs".

== Bibliography ==
- Blake, Linnie (2004), "Jörg Buttgereit's Nekromantiks: Things to do in Germany with the dead", in Mathijs, Ernest (ed.), Alternative Europe: Eurotrash and Exploitation Cinema Since 1945, Wallflower Press, ISBN 978-1903364932
- Kerekes, David (1998), "Nekromantik: what's the message with the rabbit?", Sex, Murder, Art: The Films of Jörg Buttgereit, Headpress, ISBN 978-0952328841
- Paszylk, Bartłomiej (2009), "Schramm (1993)", The Pleasure and Pain of Cult Horror Films: An Historical Survey, McFarland & Company, ISBN 978-0786453276
- Vander Lugt, Kris (2013), "From Siodmak to Schlingensief: The Return of History as Horror", in Fisher, Jaimey (ed.), Generic Histories of German Cinema: Genre and Its Deviations, Boydell & Brewer, ISBN 978-1571135704
