= Schramm (film) =

1993 film

- Directed by: Jörg Buttgereit
- Written by: Jörg Buttgereit; Franz Rodenkirchen
- Produced by: Manfred O. Jelinski
- Starring: Florian Koerner von Gustorf; Monika M.; Micha Brendel; Carolina Harnisch
- Edited by: Jörg Buttgereit; Manfred O. Jelinski
- Music by: Max Müller; Gundula Schmitz
- Release date: 1993
- Running time: 65 min.
- Country: Germany
- Language: German

Schramm is a 1993 German exploitation horror film written and directed by Jörg Buttgereit, with screenplay credit also to Franz Rodenkirchen. It tells the story of a man referred to in the media as the 'Lipstick Killer', who is believed to have had multiple victims.

== Synopsis ==
Lothar Schramm is a polite, neighborly cab driver who makes an honest living. Sometimes he invites callers in for cognac, such as a couple who come to his door seeking to tell him about Jesus. Later, he might slit their throats and assemble their bodies in suggestive poses.

He lives next door to a young, beautiful prostitute named Marianne, with whom he is smitten. Schramm is lonely. His sex life is seriously deranged, with various expressions, and his social life is nonexistent. He whitewashes bloodstains from his murders off the walls of his flat.

When Marianne is invited by some affluent gentlemen clients to a villa outside of town, she asks Schramm to chauffeur her so she'll be safe. He accepts and afterward invites her to a friendly dinner, ignoring his desire for her. He takes her back to his flat, where he drugs, strips, and photographs her. He masturbates over her naked body. The next day, Marianne rings at his door for a lift, but Schramm does not answer. He has fallen from a ladder while painting over the blood on his walls and dies. His head has cracked on the floor.

The last passage shows Marianne in the villa outside of town, attired like a Hitler Youth, and bound and gagged on a chair. She is a helpless victim to her twisted clients. Papers report the 'Lonesome Death of Lipstick Killer.'

== Cast ==
- Florian Koerner von Gustorf as Lothar Schramm
- Monika M. as Marianne
- Micha Brendel as Der Gläubige
- Carolina Harnisch as Die Gläubige
- Xaver Schwarzenberger as Älterer Herr 1
- Gerd Horvath as Älterer Herr 2
- Michael Brynntrup as Jesus
- Franz Rodenkirchen as Zahnarzt
- Anne Presting as Zahnärztin
- Eddi Zacharias as Liebhaber
- Michael Romahn as Selbstmörder
- Volker Hauptvogel as Kellner

== Background ==
The film opens with a quote by American serial killer Carl Panzram (executed 1930). It is loosely based on the criminology profiles of him and other documented killers.
