= Jörg Buttgereit =

German film director

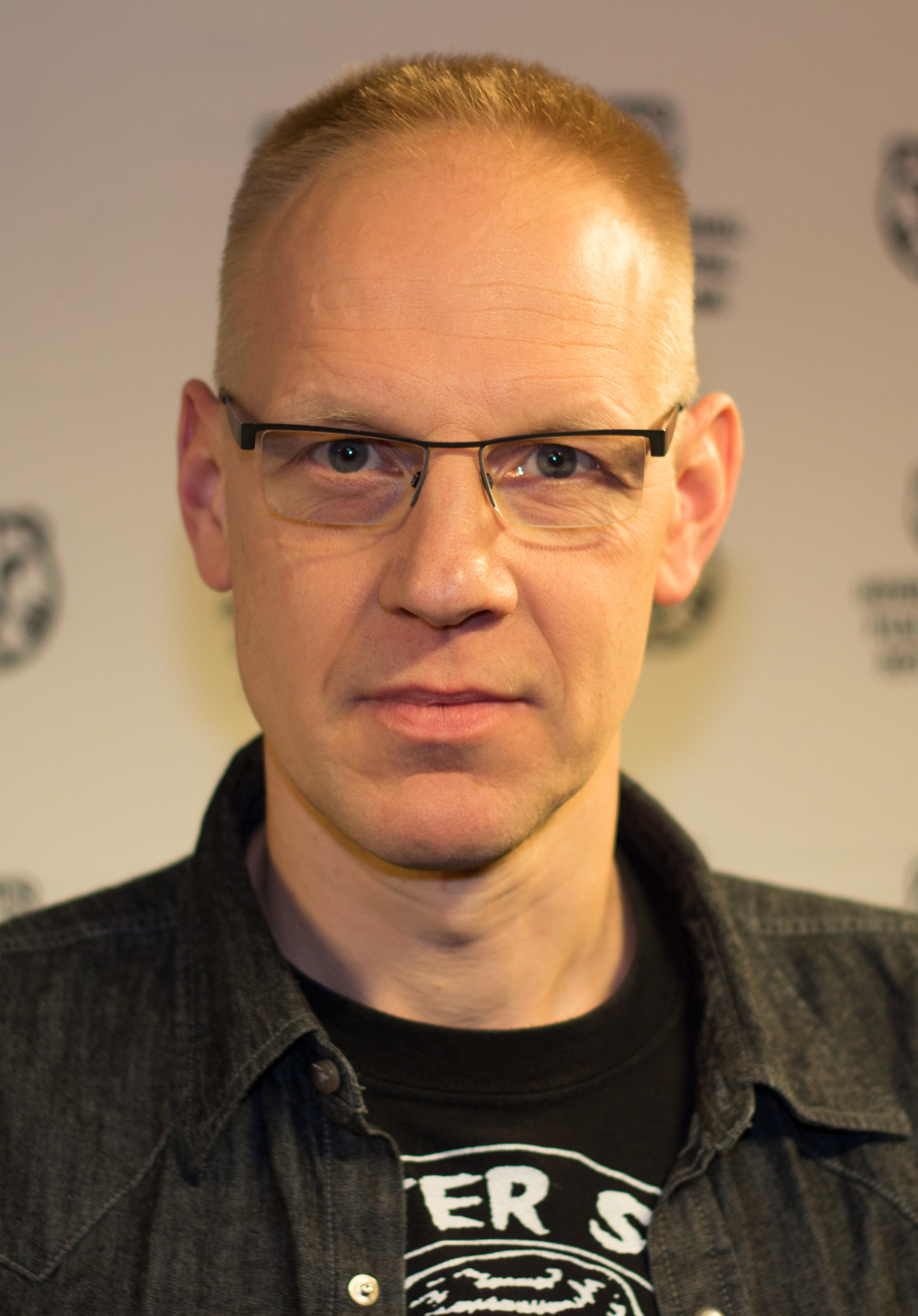
- Buttgereit in 2015
- Born: 20 December 1963 (age 61); West Berlin, West Germany
- Occupation(s): Film director, screenwriter, producer
- Years active: 1981–present
- Notable work: Nekromantik, Der Todesking, Nekromantik 2, Schramm

Jörg Buttgereit (born 20 December 1963) is a German writer/director known for his controversial films. He was born in Berlin and has lived there his entire life. He is best known for his horror films Nekromantik (1987), Der Todesking (1990), Nekromantik 2 (1991) and Schramm (1993).

In 1999, he directed an episode of the television series Lexx, after a six-year absence from the entertainment industry. In 2013, Buttgereit announced that he would be teaming up with fellow horror directors Andreas Marschall and Michal Kosakowski to work on an anthology film called German Angst, in which each director would do one short. The film was released on 7 May 2015.

Buttgereit's superhero character, Captain Berlin, was adapted into a comic book series in 2013. There is also a comic book version of Nekromantik.

== Early life ==
Buttgereit was raised in West Berlin while the Berlin Wall was still standing and the Allied Forces – Britain, France and the United States – each controlled a section of West Berlin. Hence, young Buttgereit went to the movie theaters to watch films from the aforementioned countries, he particularly enjoyed watching monster movies from the age of four. His grandmother bought him packs of Creature Feature bubblegum cards while he was in kindergarten and for his first Holy communion he received a Super 8 camera.

Buttgereit has been experimenting with film since 1977. His first project was called Gags und Schwarzer Humor, a parody of TV commercials. Color Trip was created after his camera broke and the developers gave him back black, blank film. After scratching and washing the film, something blue, black and green came out of the projector. Klassenfahrt was a movie about his class in his last year at school. Stress was another version of Color Trip using another returned blank film. He claims his very first feature was called Interview with Frankenstein.

The Exploding Sports Shoe (1980) was a two-minute film consisting of a sport shoe exploding in slow-motion. It was shown on TV as part of a documentary about punk rock; the original title was The Most Beautiful Destruction.

In 2012, speaking at the Leeds International Film Festival, Buttgereit said that he was happy working in stage and television production and cited internet piracy as a problem for low-budget filmmakers.

== Filmography (as writer and director) ==
- Ogar der Hässliche (1981)
- Captain Berlin (1982)
- Mein Papi (1982)
- Blutige Exzesse im Führerbunker (1982)
- Der Gollob (1983)
- Horror Heaven (1984)
- Hot Love (1985)
- Crucifixion (episode in Jesus – Der Film) (1986)
- Nekromantik (1987)
- Der Todesking (1990)
- Nekromantik 2 (1991)
- Schramm (1993)
- Die Monsterinsel (documentary) (2002)
- Through the Night with Michaela Schaffrath and Mark Benecke (documentary) (2007)
- Through the Night with Asia Argento and Joe Coleman (documentary) (2007)
- Monsterland (documentary) (2009)
- Captain Berlin VS Hitler (2010)
- Into the Night with Oda Jaune and Lars Eidinger (documentary) (2010)
- A Moment of Silence at the Grave of Ed Gein (short film) (2012)
- Monsters of Arthouse (DVD compilation of Buttgereit stageplays) (2013)
- German Angst (with Andreas Marschall and Michal Kosakowski) (2015)
- Schweinchen - Piglets (decomposition documentary with Dr. Mark Benecke (2020)
