= Der Todesking =

- Directed by: Jörg Buttgereit
- Screenplay by: Franz Rodenkirchen; Jörg Buttgereit
- Produced by: Manfred O. Jelinski
- Starring: Nicolas Petche; Hermann Kopp; Heinrich Ebber
- Cinematography: Manfred O. Jelinski
- Edited by: Manfred O. Jelinski; Franz Rodenkirchen; Jörg Buttgereit
- Production companies: Manfred Jelinski Film & Fernsehproduktion
- Release date: 25 January 1990 (Germany)
- Running time: 74 minutes
- Country: West Germany

Der Todesking (lit. 'The Death King') is a 1990 German horror film directed by Jörg Buttgereit. This experimental-style movie, which does not use central characters, explores the topic of suicide and violent death in the form of seven episodes, each one attributed to one day of the week. These episodes are enframed by the vision of a human body, slowly rotting during the course of the movie.

== Plot ==
Monday

A man comes home, phones his boss to resign from his job, writes mysterious letters, cleans his apartment and swallows poison in his bathtub. His death is simultaneous with the death of his fish, the only being that was close to him.

Tuesday

A man rents a film in a video store, a Nazisploitation movie in which Nazi soldiers are torturing a prisoner in a concentration camp, castrating him and painting a swastika on his chest. When the young man's girlfriend comes home, she yells at him until he shoots her in the head. He then breaks a picture frame which had a picture of his girlfriend in it, takes the picture out and then places the picture frame over the place on the wall where her brain matter was splattered. This whole episode is revealed as being shown on a TV screen in a room where somebody else committed suicide by hanging.

Wednesday

A man and a girl meet in a park in the pouring rain. The man tells the girl about his disastrous sex life with his wife which led to him killing her. The girl then pulls out a gun to kill him, but the man takes it from her and shoots himself in the mouth.

Thursday

The Mangfall Bridge, motorway bridge in Germany superimposed by the names, ages, and occupations of the people who have jumped from it.

Friday

A woman, alone in her apartment, observes a young, seemingly happy couple in the neighborhood. She spies on them until they are out of her sight. She then finds a chain letter in front of her door, urging her to commit suicide. Obviously everybody in the apartment got a chain letter as well. She ends up ignoring it by ripping up the chain letter and throwing it away, eats some chocolate, and falls asleep on her couch, dreaming of the past when she was a child, walking into her parents' room while they were having sex. The camera then shows the young couple from before, dead on their bed.

Saturday

A young woman, equipped with a camera and a gun, kills several people in the audience of a rock concert (the frontman is played by Die Ärzte drummer Bela B) and records it on film, until someone kills her.

Sunday

A man, alone on his bed, is crying and banging his head over and over, violently against the wall, until he succumbs to brain damage.

== Release ==
Der Todesking was released in Germany on 25 January 1990.

The film was released on special edition DVD in its native Germany in 2010.

== Reception ==
Kurt Dahlke of DVD Talk called it "strong, meditative, and brutally sad", commending the film's soundtrack, cinematography, and mature themes. Sean Leonard from HorrorNews.net gave the film similar praise, stating that the film "leave[s] you with a certain feeling that you can't quite place but wish would just go away".
