= Paul Haig discography =

- Studio albums: 14
- EPs: 2
- Compilation albums: 4
- Singles: 23

This is the solo discography of the Scottish indie musician, singer and songwriter Paul Haig.

== Albums ==
=== Studio albums ===
Title	Album details	Peak chart positions
Title	Album details	UK
Drama	Released: November 1981; Label: Rhythm of Life Organisation; Formats: MC; Limited release	—
Rhythm of Life	Released: October 1983; Label: Les Disques du Crépuscule; Formats: LP, MC	82
The Warp of Pure Fun	Released: November 1985; Label: Les Disques du Crépuscule; Formats: LP, MC	—
Chain	Released: 15 May 1989; Label: Circa; Formats: CD, LP, MC	—
Cinematique	Released: September 1991; Label: LTM; Formats: CD	—
Coincidence vs Fate	Released: April 1993; Label: Les Disques du Crépuscule; Formats: CD	—
Memory Palace (with Billy MacKenzie)	Released: 19 August 1999; Label: Rhythm of Life; Formats: CD	—
Cinematique 2	Released: March 2001; Label: Rhythm of Life; Formats: CD	—
Cinematique 3	Released: September 2003; Label: Rhythm of Life; Formats: CD	—
Electronik Audience	Released: 11 June 2007; Label: Rhythm of Life; Formats: CD, digital download	—
Go Out Tonight	Released: 14 April 2008; Label: Rhythm of Life; Formats: CD, digital download	—
Relive	Released: 16 November 2009; Label: Rhythm of Life; Formats: CD, digital download	—
Kube	Released: 14 October 2013; Label: Rhythm of Life; Formats: CD, digital download	—
The Wood	Released: 7 September 2018; Label: Les Disques du Crépuscule; Formats: CD, LP, digital download	—
"—" denotes releases that did not chart.

=== Compilation albums ===
Title	Album details
European Sun – Archive Collection 1982–1987	Released: December 1987; Label: Les Disques du Crépuscule; Formats: CD, LP
Then Again	Released: April 2004; Label: LTM; Formats: CD
At Twilight	Released: 20 January 2014; Label: Les Disques du Crépuscule; Formats: 2xCD
Metamorphosis	Released: 9 September 2016; Label: Les Disques du Crépuscule; Formats: 2xCD

== EPs ==
Title	Album details
Paul Haig	Released: July 1984; Label: Les Disques du Crépuscule; Formats: LP; Remix mini-album
Swing in '82	Released: April 1985; Label: Les Disques du Crépuscule; Formats: 12"

== Singles ==
Title	Year	Peak chart positions		Album
Title	Year	UK	UK Indie	Album
"Soon" (as Rhythm of Life)	1981	—	—	Non-album singles
"Uncle Sam" (as Rhythm of Life)	1982	—	—	Non-album singles
"Running Away"	1982	—	19	Non-album singles
"Blue for You"	1982	—	—	Rhythm of Life
"Heaven Sent"	1983	74	—	Rhythm of Life
"Never Give Up (Party Party)"	1983	96	—	Rhythm of Life
"Justice"	1983	128	—	Rhythm of Life
"Big Blue World" (Belgium-only release)	1984	—	19	The Warp of Pure Fun
"The Only Truth"	1984	—	—	The Warp of Pure Fun
"Heaven Help You Now"	1985	—	18	The Warp of Pure Fun
"Scottish Christmas" (Belgium-only release)	1985	—	—	Ghosts of Christmas Past (various artists)
"Love Eternal"	1986	—	35	The Warp of Pure Fun
"Torchomatic" (Belgium-only release)	1988	—	—	Non-album single
"Something Good"	1989	—	—	Chain
"I Believe in You"	1990	—	—	Coincidence vs Fate
"Flight X"	1991	—	—	Coincidence vs Fate
"Surrender" (Belgium-only release)	1993	—	—	Coincidence vs Fate
"Listen to Me" (Austria-only limited release)	1998	—	—	Memory Palace
"Reason"	2007	—	—	Electronik Audience
"Thieves"	2007	—	—	Electronik Audience
"Hippy Dippy (Pharmaceutically Trippy)"	2008	—	—	Go Out Tonight
"Trip Out the Rider"	2010	—	—	Relieve
"UW2B"/"Red Rocks"	2013	—	—	Kube
"—" denotes releases that did not chart or were not released in that territory.
