= Then Again (Paul Haig album) =

Compilation album by Paul Haig
- Released: 2004
- Recorded: 1982–1998
- Genre: Synthpop
- Label: LTM
- Producer: Paul Haig

Paul Haig chronology
Cinematique 3 (2003)	Then Again (2004)	Electronik Audience (2007)

"Then Again [LTMCD 2366] | Paul Haig | LTM".

Then Again is a collection of rarities, remixes and lost songs by former Josef K frontman Paul Haig recorded between 1982 and 1998, including previously unreleased material. Guests include Alan Rankine, Cabaret Voltaire, Mantronik, Bernard Sumner, Donald Johnson of A Certain Ratio and Finitribe.

This compilation is a companion to the 1988 Les Disques Du Crepuscule release, European Sun. There is some duplication of tracks on the two compilations.

== Track listing ==
1. Time
2. Chance
3. Blue For You (Interference Mix)
4. Change of Heart
5. Fear Of Dancing
6. The Executioner
7. Love Eternal (12" Mix)
8. The Only Truth (U.S. Remix)
9. This Dying Flame (12" Mix)
10. Heaven Help You Now (Mantronik Mix)
11. Reach The Top
12. Swinging For You
13. The Electrician
14. The Shining
15. Psycho San Jose

== Track details ==
Time: B-side of Haig's first single, "Running Away" in 1982.

Chance: Recorded in 1982 but remained unreleased until it was included as the b-side to the "Heaven Help You Now" 12" single.

Blue For You: Released as a 12" dance single on Les Disques Du Crepuscule imprint Interference in 1983. Backing vocals by Giles and Samantha of Hey Elastica!

Change of Heart: Recorded in late 1982 for a proposed album of 12" mixes. This project was abandoned after Haig signed to Island Records.

Fear And Dancing: Recorded for the unreleased Island album sometime in 1984. Produced with Alan Rankine. This track was also included on the European Sun compilation album from 1988.

The Executioner: Collaboration with Cabaret Voltaire recorded in 1984 and at one stage intended for release as a single. This track is also included on the European Sun compilation album from 1988.

Love Eternal (12" Mix): Released in March 1986 on Les Disques Du Crepuscule. Produced with Alan Rankine.

The Only Truth (U.S. Remix): Released as a 12" single on Island Records in October 1984. Jointly produced by New Order stalwart Bernard Sumner and Donald Johnson of A Certain Ratio. Sumner and Johnson also play guitar and percussion respectively.

This Dying Flame (12" Mix): Previously unreleased. Co-produced with Alan Rankine.

Heaven Help You Now (Mantronik Mix): Only previously appeared as an extra track on the "Surrender" CD single in 1993. Additional production and remix by Mantronik in New York City.

Reach The Top and Swinging For You: Recorded in Brussels in September 1987. The third song from this session, "Torchomatic" was released as a 12" single in October 1988. "Reach The Top" was recorded by Billy MacKenzie for The Glamour Chase album, which was not released until after MacKenzie's death.

The Electrician and The Shining: Taken from the Finitribe album Sleazy Listening, recorded in 1998. "The Shining" is dedicated to Billy MacKenzie.

Psycho San Jose: Recorded in Edinburgh in Summer 1987. Previously appeared on the European Sun compilation album from 1988.
