= Chain (Paul Haig album) =

Chain (album)

Studio album by Paul Haig
- Released: 15 May 1989
- Recorded: 1988
- Genre: Synthpop
- Label: Circa
- Producer: Paul Haig and Alan Rankine

Paul Haig chronology
European Sun (1988)	Chain (album) (1989)	Cinematique (1991)

Chain was Edinburgh musician Paul Haig's third album and was released in May 1989 on Circa Records, a subsidiary of Virgin Records. Chain, which Haig financed himself, was recorded and completed in 1988, but it sat on the shelf after the normally accommodating Les Disques Du Crepuscule decided not to take up the option of releasing it. The album was co-produced by long-time Haig cohort, Alan Rankine, instrumentalist with celebrated Dundee band, The Associates. There was another Associates connection on the album - the track "Chained" was written by Haig's good friend, Billy Mackenzie. Haig returned the favour and gave Mackenzie the track "Reach The Top" for his album The Glamour Chase, which after many years in limbo was finally released in 2002.

One single, "Something Good", was taken from the album, but much to Circa's disappointment, neither the single nor the album sold in great numbers.

The sleeve features a shot of Audrey Hepburn, taken by the celebrated photographer, Angus McBean in 1958.

Deleted for many years, Chain was re-released by Cherry Red Records in November 2007.

== Reception ==
Professional ratings
Review scores
Source	Rating
Allmusic	2/5 stars
Coventry Evening Telegraph	4/5 stars
Record Collector	3
Lancashire Evening Post	3
South Wales Echo	4.5

Gloucestershire Echo wrote that the "bold, unalloyed lyrics however do not do justice to the warmth of the coustic introductions and the listener perp[l]exed by the contrast is left feeling unsympathtic and indifferent. Sadly another Paul Haig album slips away". North Wales Weekly News echoed the contrast: "What makes it so strange is that the tunes areoftren so warm and tender or boppy, but Haig has a deep doom-laden voice that sound like a creaking coffin lid. Every time Haig writes a tune song thrushes want to join in on the chorus; every time he sings 13 ravens take off". Huddersfield Daily Examiner noted it as a positive: Chain struck up a "passionate—yet never promiscuous—relationship between acoustic warmth and the harsh coldness of dreaded technology. Haig strives for seductive simplicity—and he achieves it". Halifax Evening Courier were positive too: "There isn't a duff track hre – post-80's technological music with a human face".

Penny Black Music reviewed the re-release, calling it an "impressive reissue" with a disinct 1980s feel.

== Track listing - 1989 release ==
1. "Something Good"
2. "True Blue"
3. "Communication"
4. "Swinging for You"
5. "Time of Her Time"
6. "Faithless"
7. "Times Can Change"
8. "Turn the Vision"
9. "Sooner or Later"
10. "Chained"
11. "Ideal of Living"

== Track listing - 2007 release ==
1. "Something Good"
2. "True Blue"
3. "Communication"
4. "Swinging for You"
5. "Time of Her Time"
6. "Faithless"
7. "Times Can Change"
8. "Turn the Vision"
9. "Sooner or Later"
10. "Chained"
11. "Ideal of Living"
12. "Something Good" (10" Mix)
13. "Over You"
14. "Free to Go (Public)"
15. "Ideal of Living" (Remix)
16. "The Last Kiss"
