= Heaven Help You Now =

Single by Paul Haig

from the album The Warp of Pure Fun
- Released: September 1985
- Recorded: 1982
- Genre: Synthpop
- Label: Les Disques Du Crepuscule, Operation Afterglow
- Songwriter(s): Paul Haig
- Producer(s): Paul Haig, Alan Rankine

Paul Haig singles chronology
"The Only Truth" (1984)	"Heaven Help You Now" (1985)	"Scottish Christmas" (1985)

"Heaven Help You Now" is the eighth solo single from former Josef K vocalist Paul Haig. It was released by Les Disques Du Crepuscule in September 1985.

The single was co-produced with former Associates instrumentalist Alan Rankine.

== Track listing ==
1. "Heaven Help You Now" (Extended)
2. "World Raw"
3. "Heaven Help You Now"
4. "Chance"
