= Big Blue World =

Single by Paul Haig

from the album The Warp of Pure Fun
- B-side: "Ghost Rider"
- Released: 1984
- Recorded: June 1984
- Genre: Synthpop
- Label: Les Disques Du Crepuscule
- Songwriter(s): Paul Haig
- Producer(s): Paul Haig, Alan Rankine

Paul Haig singles chronology
"Never Give Up (Party Party)" (1983)	"Big Blue World" (1984)	"The Only Truth" (1984)

"Big Blue World" is the sixth solo single by Paul Haig, and the first single from his second album, The Warp of Pure Fun. It was produced by Haig and former Associates instrumentalist Alan Rankine, and released in the UK and across Europe by Les Disques Du Crepuscule.

One of its B-sides is "Ghost Rider", a cover of the Suicide song, written by Martin Rev and Alan Vega.

== Track listing ==
1. "Big Blue World"
2. "Ghost Rider"
3. "Endless Song"

Big Blue World, Belgian 12" single sleeve
