= Heaven Sent (Paul Haig song) =

Single by Paul Haig

from the album Rhythm of Life
- Released: April 1983
- Recorded: 1983
- Genre: Synth-pop
- Label: Island; Les Disques du Crépuscule
- Songwriter: Paul Haig
- Producers: Alex Sadkin; Paul Haig

Paul Haig singles chronology
"Blue for You" (1983)	"Heaven Sent" (1983)	"Never Give Up (Party Party)" (1983)

"Heaven Sent" is the fourth solo single by the Scottish musician Paul Haig. It was released in the UK by Island Records and licensed through Les Disques du Crépuscule in April 1983. It reached a peak of position of number 74 on the UK singles chart.

This was Haig's first release with a major record label. The track, along with its parent studio album, Rhythm of Life (1983), was recorded in New York City with record producer Alex Sadkin. A wide range of guest musicians appeared on the album; Tom Bailey of Thompson Twins, Bernie Worrell of Funkadelic and Anton Fier of the Feelies.

In mainland Europe, the single and album were released on Les Disques du Crépuscule.

== Track listing ==
1. "Heaven Sent"
2. "Running Away"/"Back Home"

== Charts ==
Chart (1983)	Position
UK Singles (OCC)	74
