= My Kind =

My Kind may refer to:

- "My Kind", song by Pitchshifter from Bootlegged, Distorted, Remixed and Uploaded
- "My Kind", song by Hilary Duff from Breathe In. Breathe Out.
- "My Kind", song by Paul Haig from Coincidence vs Fate
- "My Kind", song by Jason Mraz from Look For The Good
