= I Believe in You (Paul Haig song) =

1990 song performed by Paul Haig

Single by Paul Haig

from the album Coincidence vs Fate
- Released: September 1990
- Recorded: 1989
- Genre: Synthpop
- Label: Circa Records
- Songwriter(s): Paul Haig
- Producer(s): Paul Haig, The Chimes, Mantronik ("Flight X")

Paul Haig singles chronology
"Something Good" (1989)	"I Believe in You" (1990)	"Flight X" (1991)

"I Believe in You" is the first single from Paul Haig's proposed second album on Circa Records, Right on Line. Ultimately, the lack of success with this single and its follow-up, "Flight X", persuaded Circa to drop Haig and shelve the album. Right on Line contained tracks produced by James Locke (of The Chimes), Lil Louis and Mantronik.

The album did eventually surface three years later on Les Disques Du Crepuscule, retitled as Coincidence vs Fate. LTM re-released a remastered version of the album in 2003 with extra tracks.

== Track listing ==
1. "I Believe in You"
2. "Flight X"
3. "I Believe in You" (Life in a Dolphinarium Mix)
