= Cinematique 3 =

Studio album by Paul Haig
- Released: October 2003
- Recorded: 2002
- Genre: Synthpop
- Label: Rhythm of Life
- Producer: Paul Haig

Paul Haig chronology
Cinematique 2 (2001)	Cinematique 3 (2003)	Then Again (2004)

Cinematique 3 is the final in a series of three instrumental albums by Paul Haig, subtitled "Themes to Unknown Films". The album was released by private label Rhythm of Life in 2003.

The two previous albums, Cinematique and Cinematique 2 were released in 1991 and 2001 respectively.

== Track listing ==
1. Ice Station X
2. Nitemute
3. Over Over
4. No Place Within
5. Speedway
6. Electronia
7. Milan
8. Slinky Android
9. Siliconic
10. Transportal
11. Ecliptic
12. Xenogamy
13. Find Me
14. So Fine
15. Contact
16. Storm
