= Chris Connelly (musician) =

Scottish musician (born 1964)

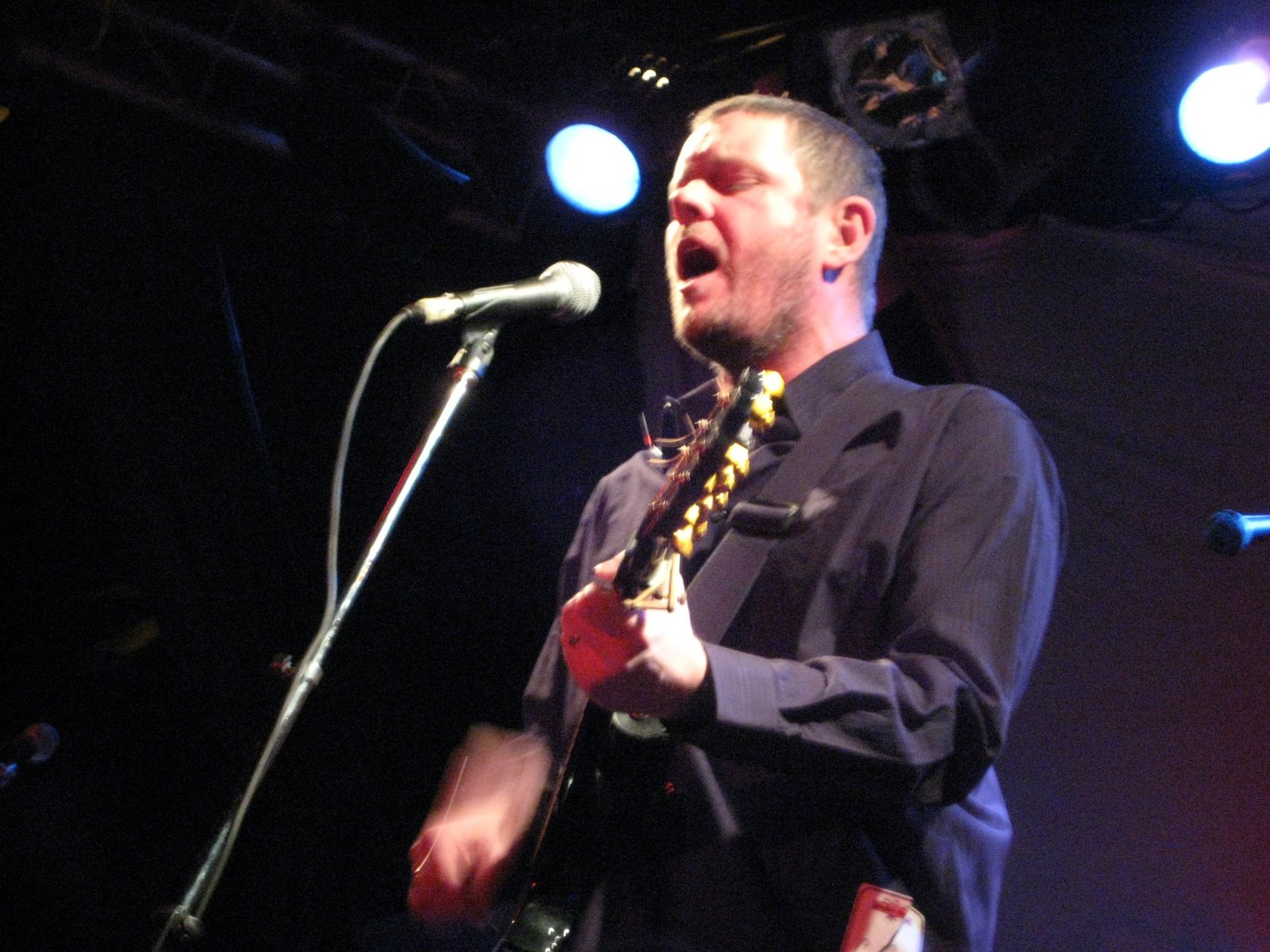
- Connelly in 2008

Background information
- Born: 11 November 1964 (age 61)
- Origin: Bruntsfield, Edinburgh, Scotland
- Genres: Industrial rock; alternative rock; experimental
- Occupations: Musician; singer-songwriter; author
- Instruments: Vocals; guitars; keyboards; bass
- Years active: 1980–present
- Label: Underground, Inc. Shipwrecked Industries
- Website: chrisconnelly.com

Chris Connelly (born 11 November 1964) is a Scottish musician and author. He is notable for his industrial music work of the late 1980s and early 1990s, particularly his involvement with the Revolting Cocks and Ministry.

Connelly has maintained his involvement within the music industry for over 40 years. He has released over 25 solo albums and 10+ additional albums while fronting other bands (the vast majority being musical groups of his own creation); as well as lending vocals to dozens of collaborations spanning several genres in the process, resulting in the release of over 600 total songs.

== Early years ==
Connelly was born in Bruntsfield, Scotland to Michael and Sadie (née King) Connelly near the city centre of Edinburgh. Connelly's father died in a swimming accident early in his life, causing Chris to focus on artistic interests outside the home to help fill the void. Connelly's Scottish ancestry includes Irish descent through the Connellys and Murphys, who originally came from Ireland to Scotland. His mother's side, the Kings and the McCullochs, were from the Highlands and migrated to Glasgow in search of work.

== Music career ==
Connelly began his music career in 1980 with the formation of Fini Tribe. Through subsequent years he fronted or was heavily involved with numerous notable industrial, dance, and new wave acts. In 2008, Connelly published a memoir of his early years in the music industry, Concrete, Bulletproof, Invisible, and Fried: My Life As A Revolting Cock. It describes his professional debut in Finitribe, meeting Al Jourgensen in London, his involvement with the Revolting Cocks, Ministry, PTP, Acid Horse, Front Line Assembly, Murder, Inc., and Pigface, and the development of his solo career.

Connelly's first solo album 'Whiplash Boychild' was released in 1991, and in 1992 'Phenobarb Bambalam' and toured with most of the musicians on the album, except bassist Stuart Zechman.

Following the tour Chris put his solo efforts on hold in order to concentrate on Ministry/Revolting Cocks matters, resulting in a successful Ministry slot on the 1992 Lollapalooza tour, as well as heavy involvement in the recording of 1993 Revolting Cocks album 'Linger Ficken' Good'. The subsequent tour was canceled and the Revolting Cocks went on an extended 13 year hiatus, with Connelly not rejoining until 2011.

Chris severed ties with Ministry and briefly moved to Kansas City, Missouri. In 1994, the solo album 'Shipwreck' was released during a difficult time in his life, which marked the return of Bill Rieflin on drums, with guitarists Chris Bruce and William Tucker. He took another break from music, except for his appearance on KMFDM's 1996 album 'XTORT'.

In 1997, the album 'The Ultimate Seaside Companion' was released under the band name "The Bells". A limited number of local live shows were played to showcase the new album and band before their separation due to other commitments.

In 1999, saw the reunion of Chris and Martin Atkins, who had a previous falling-out after the release of Pigface's 'FOOK', Connelly was approached by Atkins to fill the vocalist gap initially turned down by Johnny Rotten, with guitarist Geordie Walker and bass player Jah Wobble, the EP '>1' was released in 2000, followed by 'The Damage Manual'. A double-album remix compilation would be released in 2004.

In 2004, 'Night of your Life' was released, featuring guitarist Chris Bruce. The Damage Manual was re-formed with Steven Seibold playing both the guitar and bass guitar tracks. 'Limited Edition' was released and a fall 2004 tour was planned in support of Pigface, however Connelly had to pull out due to a serious undisclosed illness. The tour was delayed until spring of 2005 without Chris's presence.

In 2007, Chris and his previous bandmates formed the "Lake Wandawega Resort Band". The album 'The Episodes' was released later that year, with Tim Kinsella, Ben Vida, and Graeme Gibson all aiding in production, mixing, and arranging.

In 2008, the first of Chris's politically active trilogy of albums was released, titled 'Forgiveness & Exile' (with contributions from Shirley Manson), soon followed by 2010's 'How this Ends' (last Connelly contribution by Bill Rieflin), and concluding with 2012's 'Day of Knowledge' (with electronic music by Jim O'Rourke, who also played bass on 1997's 'The Ultimate Seaside Companion'). 2010 also saw the product of collaborative efforts with Sonic Youth drummer Steve Shelley and Chicago experimental metal bass player and producer Sanford Parker dubbed The High Confessions with the album 'Turning Lead into Gold'.

In 2013, he started two more industrial projects: Cocksure, with Jason C. Novak (Czar, Acumen Nation, and DJ? Acucrack), and Bells into Machines, with Paul Barker (Ministry, Revolting Cocks, and Lard), as well as the resurrection of the Cocks sans Al Jourgensen and with Richard 23 of Front 242 in 2016.

Cocksure hit 2014 in the form of an EP and their debut album 'TVMALSV'. Soon after releasing 'Corporate Sting' in 2015. Later that year Connelly's first solo album in 3 years, with Drummer Matt Walker who aided in production and collecting the session musicians, most of which were already familiar with Chris Connelly due to being in his David Bowie tribute band 'Sons of the Silent Age' since its inception in 2013.

In 2017 'Malekko' was released, where a select few songs date as back to 2012 or later when Chris Connelly was initially asked to participate but was unable to due to scheduling issues. 'Art & Gender' also came to light towards the end of the year, displaying a stark contrast to 'Decibels from Heart' released 2 years prior.

In 2017, Connelly released The Tide Stripped Bare, part of his ‘Further Days’ series. The album was self-produced at his home studio, Rock Noir, and featured Connelly performing all instruments. Contemporary reviews noted a shift toward a more atmospheric sound and complex arrangements.

In 2019, sees the release of 'Death it to Love', 'Sleeping Partner', and 'Death It...'. Some of the sounds featured were recorded at various galleries, outdoor spaces and islands.

In 2020, the sudden death of drummer and multi-instrumentalist Bill Rieflin due to cancer lead to the release of 'Graveyard Sex', recorded and released in Rieflin's honor. Chris Bruce assisted in production and percussion. In 2025, Connelly finds himself in the middle of again called Sevendials, with former Killing Joke drummer Paul Ferguson and Mark Gemeni Thwaite. The album 'A Crash Course in Catastrophe' was released to critical acclaim.

== Personal life ==
Connelly is now based in Chicago and works at a record store in Wicker Park. He and his wife of almost 20 years, filmmaker Shayna Connelly, reside in the suburb of Oak Park with their two children. Chris has also maintained and recorded all of his solo output since 2016 from his home studio, dubbed 'The Rock Noir'.

== Band affiliations ==
- Acid Horse
- Atkins & Connelly/(and Friends)
- Barker + Connelly : Luxapan
- The Bells
- Bells Into Machines
- Chris Connelly and the Dirty French Novels
- Chris Connelly & William Tucker : the "Swingin' Junkies"
- The Cocks
- Cocksure
- The Damage Manual
- Die Warzau
- Everyoned
- The Final Cut
- Fini Tribe
- The High Confessions
- The Joy Thieves
- KMFDM
- Lake Wandawega Resort Band
- The Love Interest
- Malekko
- Ministry
- Murder, Inc.
- Pigface
- Plastic Crimewave
- PTP
- Revolting Cocks
- Sevendials
- Sons of the Silent Age (David Bowie tribute band)

=== Vocal appearances ===
1983

- Cure for Madness - Fini Tribe
- Bye Bye to the October Sky - Fini Tribe

1984

- Cathedral - Fini Tribe
- Curling Theme - Fini Tribe
- Backwards and Forwards we Lean - Fini Tribe

1985

- Goose Duplicates - Fini Tribe
- An Evening with Clavichords - Fini Tribe
- We're Interested - Fini Tribe
- Splash Care - Fini Tribe

1986

- De Testimony - Fini Tribe
- Make It Internal - Fini Tribe

1987

- I want More - Fini Tribe
- Idiot Strength - Fini Tribe
- Stick - Revolting Cocks

1988

- Little Visitors - Fini Tribe
- You goddamned Son of a Bitch - Revolting Cocks
- Cattle Grind - Revolting Cocks
- In the Neck - Revolting Cocks
- TV Mind (remix) - Revolting Cocks
- You often Forget - Revolting Cocks

1989

- So What - Ministry
- Never Believe - Ministry
- Cannibal Song - Ministry
- Breathe - Ministry
- Stainless Steel Providers - Revolting Cocks
- (Let's get) Physical - Revolting Cocks
- No Name, No Slogan - Acid Horse
- Rubber Glove Seduction - PTP

1990

- Smacktime - Die Warzau
- Can't sit Still - Revolting Cocks
- Something Wonderful - Revolting Cocks
- At the Top - Revolting Cocks
- (Let's Talk) Physical - Revolting Cocks
- The Image of Red - Pigface
- Little Sisters (remix) - Pigface
- I told You not to Stop (In Tight Connelly Mix) - Final Cut

1991

- The Breakfast Conspiracy - Pigface
- Point Blank - Pigface
- Public Image - Revolting Cocks
- Careering - Pigface
- Blood and Sand - Pigface
- Weightless - Pigface
- Stowaway - Pigface
- The Amorous Humphrey Plugg - CC
- Murder Inc. - Murder, Inc.
- Mania - Murder, Inc.

1992

- I can Do no Wrong - Pigface
- Ten Ground and Down - Pigface
- 2000 Light Years from Home - F/i
- Mrs. Whiskey Name - Murder, Inc.
- Red Black - Murder, Inc.
- Supergrass - Murder, Inc.
- Primal Understanding - Final Cut
- Tranquilized - Final Cut
- Fear - Final Cut
- Trash - CC
- Souvenir from a Dream - CC
- TV II - Ministry

1993

- Bedazzled - The Love Interest
- Desperado - Chris Connelly Band
- Hole in the Wall - Murder, Inc.
- Uninvited Guest - Murder, Inc.
- Gambit - Murder, Inc.
- Sergio - Revolting Cocks
- Dirt - Revolting Cocks
- Creep - Revolting Cocks
- Butcher Flower's Woman - Revolting Cocks

1994

- Mr. Lucky - Revolting Cocks
- The Rockabye - Revolting Cocks
- Crackin' Up - Revolting Cocks
- Da Ya think I'm Sexy? - Revolting Cocks
- Last of the Urgents - Murder, Inc.
- Motion Sickness - Murder, Inc.
- ' Songs for Swingin' Junkies ' - CC with William Tucker

1995

- Don't bring Harry - Swingin' Junkies
- Eleanor Rigby - Swingin' Junkies
- Walk on By - Swingin' Junkies
- Search and Destroy - Swingin' Junkies
- Lucky Jim - Swingin' Junkies
- Cracked Actor - CC & the Shipwreck Band

1996

- Ikons - KMFDM
- Rules - KMFDM
- Craze - KMFDM
- Blame - KMFDM
- Nothing at All - Final Cut
- Sign of the Cross - Catherine
- A Mutual Friend - CC

1999

- Open Mouth - Bill Rieflin
- Box - Chainsuck
- Scissor Quickstep - The Damage Manual
- Sunset Gun - The Damage Manual
- Damage Addict - The Damage Manual
- Blame and Demand - The Damage Manual
- Leave the Ground - The Damage Manual

2000

- King Mob - The Damage Manual
- Ignore the Noise - The Damage Manual
- Age of Urges - The Damage Manual
- Top Ten Severed - The Damage Manual
- Largo - CC with Bill Rieflin
- Sea Song - CC with Bill Rieflin
- Close Watch - CC with Bill Rieflin

2001

- Supernaut - Pigface
- Flowers of Romance - Pigface
- Stateless - The Damage Manual
- Expand - The Damage Manual
- Broadcasting - The Damage Manual
- The Peepshow Ghosts - The Damage Manual
- Moonlight feels Right - The Bells
- Tears for Reep Daggle - Plastic Crimewave

2002

- Saliva Bead - CC
- All Fours - Fini Tribe
- Me and my Shadow - Fini Tribe
- Paperself - Fini Tribe
- Doomsday - VooDou
- No Man's Land - with Bill Rieflin
- Partick Roulette - with Bill Rieflin
- Hard Hearted Alice - CC
- Niddrie Street Tape Loop Experiment - CC with Andy McGregor

2003

- Miss Sway Action - Pigface
- Insect/Suspect - Pigface
- King of Negativity - Pigface
- Friends of Mine - Everyoned
- First to Know - Everyoned
- Low End Flight - Everyoned
- You wear It like Smoke - Everyoned

2004

- Where are They Now? - CC
- Knife Audition - Everyoned
- Curtains - Everyoned
- Glass shall Wake - Everyoned
- Dancer's Legs - Everyoned
- Memories - The Damage Manual
- Quiet Life - The Damage Manual
- South Pole Fighters - The Damage Manual

2005

- Limited Edition - The Damage Manual
- Revenge Fiction - The Damage Manual
- I am War Again - The Damage Manual
- Driven Menace - The Damage Manual
- No Act of Grace - The Damage Manual
- Subtraction - Jarboe
- Don't make Me Go - CC
- Lunatic - CC

2006

- Laugh Track - The Damage Manual
- Mad Dialect - The Damage Manual
- Exile on Sunset Street - The Damage Manual
- Fire and Wine - CC
- Bordell Geist - CC
- Jubbergait Nurse - CC
- Ordinary Things - Ahab Rex
- While the Saints Cry - Ahab Rex
- Wife - Ahab Rex

2007

- Looking for a River - CC

2008

- Devastation (The End of Alls) - Plastic Crimewave Sound

2009

- ' Lost Episodes ' - CC
- Wide-Eyed and Legless - CC
- Electric Knives Club - Pigface
- Bodysnatchers - History of Violence

2010

- Burning Inside - Plague Bringer
- Destroy the Light - Circle of Animals
- Mistaken for Cops - The High Confessions
- Along came the Dogs - The High Confessions
- The Listener - The High Confessions
- Dead Tenements - The High Confessions
- Chlorine and Crystal - The High Confessions

2011

- I thought it was Snow, Instead it was Flies - The High Confessions
- Compatibility - CC
- British Drug Lords - CC

2012

- Heavy Water - Paul Barker
- Evangelical Sound Barrier - Paul Barker
- Desertshores - X-TG
- The Eternal - Nachtmystium
- The Phantoms of Purgatory Souls - Phantom Plastics
- You shouldn't do That - Plastic Crimewave Syndicate
- Time We Left (This World Today) - Plastic Crimewave Syndicate
- Master of the Universe - Plastic Crimewave Syndicate
- Silver Machine - Plastic Crimewave Syndicate
- ' The Collapse of Ether ' - CC

2013

- Changes - Sons of the Silent Age
- Queen Bitch - Sons of the Silent Age
- Win - Sons of the Silent Age
- Diamond Dogs - Sons of the Silent Age
- Look Back in Anger - Sons of the Silent Age
- D.J. - Sons of the Silent Age
- Loving the Alien - Sons of the Silent Age
- Ashes to Ashes - Sons of the Silent Age
- Life on Mars? - Sons of the Silent Age

2014

- ' TVMALSV ' - Cocksure
- Black is the Colour - Human Greed
- Patricia - Mushroom's Patience
- Klusterfuck Kulture - Cocksure
- The Craighouse Dogs - Blockader
- Disfigure the Giving - Blockader
- Leave All your Troubles Behind - Blockader
- Ghosts of an unattended Hanging - Blockader
- Image of Red cut in Half - Blockader
- Grief - Esperik Glare
- Space Oddity - Sons of the Silent Age

2015

- ' Corporate Sting ' - Cocksure
- Let's Get Physical (original mix) - Revolting Cocks
- Ghosts in Gaslight - Phantom Plastics (with Michael Esposito)
- The Visit - with Michael Esposito
- Hurry - with Michael Esposito
- Behaviour - with Michael Esposito
- Purgatory - with Michael Esposito
- "Heroes" - Sons of the Silent Age
- ' New Town Nocturnes ' - CC with Michael Begg

2016

- Sound of Silence - Classical Blast
- Heretic Hypocrite - Cocksure
- Assault on Cocksure 13 - Cocksure
- The Nurses of Cocksure Island - Cocksure
- The Last Renoir (A Fiction) - CC
- Wretched little Deity - Bells into Machines
- Your Crime Scene-My Career - Bells into Machines
- The Jean Genie - Sons of the Silent Age
- Lazarus - Sons of the Silent Age
- Sorrow - Sons of the Silent Age
- Station to Station - Sons of the Silent Age

2017

- That Angel Skill (The Last Hitman) - CC
- The Whisper in Me - Malekko
- Fate won't Conduct - Malekko
- I'm slowly Breathing, Listen - Malekko
- Cadence and Landscape - Malekko
- Last to Fall, Repeat, Fall - Malekko
- Ordinary Fascist - Bells into Machines
- Stay - Sons of the Silent Age
- Fame - Sons of the Silent Age
- Star - Sons of the Silent Age
- Sound and Vision - Sons of the Silent Age

2018

- ' Be Rich ' - Cocksure
- Missions - Bells into Machines
- Sweet Life in Soaring Light - Bells into Machines
- FILMS - Bells into Machines
- ATF Shadow - Bells into Machines
- Video of Slaughter - Bells into Machines
- Machine Gun Odessa - Bells into Machines
- Joe the Lion - Sons of the Silent Age
- Sons of the Silent Age - Sons of the Silent Age

2019

- Saliva Beach (Death It to Love) - CC
- Spitting Wind - Front Line Assembly
- Your Heart in real Time - Primitive Race
- This will kill That - The Joy Thieves
- I'll give You Shape - Black Needle Noise
- Here comes the Rain - Death Valley High
- Waiting for Clouds - Morley & Friends
- Moonage Daydream - Sons of the Silent Age
- Panic in Detroit - Sons of the Silent Age
- Scary Monsters (and Super Creeps) - Sons of the Silent Age

2020

- ' Operation C.O.C.K.S.U.R.E. ' - Cocksure
- Scarlet Slip - Gasoline Invertebrate
- The Badlander - The Joy Thieves
- One of my Turns - The Joy Thieves
- Mission Accomplished - Marc Heal
- How Long - MGT
- Covert - MGT
- Death Sky - Nukes
- Farmer in the City - CC
- I'll come Running - CC
- Things We said Today - CC
- Kites - CC
- Stun to the One - CC
- Prayer - CC with Jessica Gallo
- TVC 15 - Sons of the Silent Age
- Ziggy Stardust - Sons of the Silent Age
- Suffragette City - Sons of the Silent Age

2021

- ' American Parasite ' - The Joy Thieves
- My Favorite Things - Luxapan
- Show Me your Spine - Luxapan
- Desolate District - Sine
- Saeta - CC
- Genocide Love Song - The Joy Thieves
- Nemesis - The Joy Thieves
- Seed and Star - Jennifer Gallo
- Chicken Shit - Chris Connelly Band
- Fucking Up - Chris Connelly Band
- Alladin Sane - Sons of the Silent Age
- Young Americans - Sons of the Silent Age

2022

- Property - The Joy Thieves
- The Unknowing Muse - Sapphira Vee
- Doctor Seraphim - Kooper Kain
- Deaf Blood - The Derision Cult
- Largo's Prayer - CC
- Come Together - Lifeline International
- The Opium Glove Puppet - CC
- Abandoned Premonition - CC
- Harbour Days II - CC
- Femme Fatale - CC
- Sixty Forty - CC

2023

- Shelta's Lament - CC
- Cat Black (The Wizard's Hat) - The Liquid Gang
- Miss X - Joecephus and the George Jonestown Massacre
- Elizabeth's Rock - CC
- The Skye Boat Song - CC
- Purity is Dead - CC
- Come back early or Never Come - CC

2024

- Courtesy of the USA - Cringe Fantasy
- Obsession - Sevendials
- Zodiac Morals - Sevendials
- Whispering Wand - Sevendials
- Wolves - Sevendials
- The Number One Song in Heaven - Sevendials
- Golden Years - Sons of the Silent Age
- Starman - Sons of the Silent Age
- The Man who Sold the World - Sons of the Silent Age
- This is not America - Sons of the Silent Age

2025

- Welcome Home - Trade Secrets
- The Constant - Fini Tribe
- Restless - Fini Tribe
- Throttlehearts - Fini Tribe
- Weathervayne Days - Sevendials
- Too High to Live - Sevendials
- Knife without Asking - Sevendials
- Corrupted Verse - Sevendials
- Before you make your Distance - Sevendials
- Cupboard Cassette Tape - with Phil Puleo
- Heathen Earth - CC plays TG
- Mother Spunk - CC plays TG
- Fashion - Sons of the Silent Age
- Under Pressure - Sons of the Silent Age

2026

- ' Apocalypse Pending ' - The Joy Thieves
- Needles on the Tundra (remix) - Moiii
- Blue Jean - Sons of the Silent Age
- Let's Dance - Sons of the Silent Age
- All the Young Dudes - Sons of the Silent Age
- I'm afraid of Americans - Sons of the Silent Age
- Vampire - Atkins & Connelly (and Friends)
- Banging the Door - Atkins & Connelly (and Friends)
- Dime Store Mystery - CC and the Dirty French Novels
- Rock and Roll Heart - CC and the Dirty French Novels
- War.Poem Zero - CC

== Solo discography ==
- Whiplash Boychild (1991)
- Phenobarb Bambalam (1992)
- Shipwreck (1994)
- Songs for Swinging Junkies (with William Tucker) (1994)
- The Ultimate Seaside Companion (with The Bells) (1997)
- Blonde Exodus (with The Bells) (2001)
- Largo (with Bill Rieflin) (2000)
- Private Education (2002)
- Initials C.C.- Out-Takes, Rarities and Personal Favourites 1982-2002 Vol. 1 (2002)
- Night of Your Life (2004)
- Lounge Ax, Bottle, Elsewhere - '94/'01 (Initials C.C. Vol. 2) (2005)
- Box Set (2006)
- The Episodes (2007)
- Forgiveness & Exile (2008)
- Pentland Firth Howl (2009)
- How This Ends (2010)
- Artificial Madness (2011)
- Day of Knowledge (2012)
- The Collapse of Ether (2012)
- Blockader: Recordings 83-88 (2014)
- Decibels From Heart (2015)
- New Town Nocturnes (with Michael Begg) (2016)
- Art + Gender (2017)
- Further Days (2017)
- The Tide stripped Bare (2018)
- Bloodhounds (2018)
- Death It to Love (2019)
- Sleeping Partner (2019)
- Graveyard Sex (2020)
- The Birthday Poems (2021)
- Firth Rebirth (2021)
- Abandoned Premonitions (2022)
- LARGO 22 (2022)
- Eulogy to Christa: A Tribute to the Music and Mystique of Nico (2022)
- SHELTA (2023)
- The Lives and Loves of the Serial Homesick, Volume 1 (2024)
- White Phosphorus (Chris Connelly plays Throbbing Gristle) (2025)
- War.Poem (2026)
- Doo Wop in the Dark: A Portrait of Lou Reed (2026)

=== Guest appearances ===
- Front Line Assembly – Wake Up the Coma (2019)
- Paul Barker – Fix This!!! (2012)
- Jarboe – The Men Album (2005)
- Catherine – Hot Saki & Bedtime Stories (1996)
- Die Warzau - Vinyl88 (2008)

=== Music compilation appearances ===
- "Desperado" on Welcome to Our Nightmare: a Tribute to Alice Cooper (1993)
- "A Mutual Friend" on Whore: Various Artists Play Wire (1996)
- "Hard Hearted Alice" on Mutations – A Tribute To Alice Cooper (2002)
- "What's Left But Solid Gold?" on ...It Just Is (2005)
- "Don't Make Me Go" on Cash From Chaos – A Tribute to the Man in Black, Johnny Cash (2005)
- "Looking for a River" on Whispers From the Offing (A Tribute to Kevin Coyne) (2007)

== Bibliography ==
- Confessions of the Highest Bidder: Poems and Songwords, 1982-1996 (1999) KB Publishing
- Concrete, Bulletproof, Invisible and Fried (2007) SAF Publishing ISBN 978-0-946719-95-2
- Ed Royal (2010) Shipwrecked Industries
- The Heart has to Ache before it Learns to Beat (2020) Shipwrecked Industries ISBN 978-0-9664065-7-3

=== Spoken word ===
- New Town Nocturnes (2016) a collaboration with Michael Begg
