= Never Give Up (Party Party) =

Single by Paul Haig

from the album Rhythm of Life
- Released: 1983
- Recorded: 1983
- Genre: Synth-pop
- Length: 3:24
- Label: Island Records; Les Disques du Crépuscule
- Songwriter: Paul Haig
- Producers: Alex Sadkin; Paul Haig

Paul Haig singles chronology
| "Heaven Sent" (1983) | "Never Give Up (Party Party)" (1983) | "Big Blue World" (1984) |

Promo music video
- "Never Give Up (Party Party)" on YouTube

"Never Give Up (Party Party)" is the fifth solo single by the Scottish musician Paul Haig. It was released in the UK on Island Records and licensed through Les Disques du Crépuscule.

The track, along with its parent studio album Rhythm of Life (1983), was recorded in New York City with record producer Alex Sadkin. A wide range of guest musicians appeared on the album; Tom Bailey of Thompson Twins, Bernie Worrell of Funkadelic and Anton Fier of the Feelies.

In mainland Europe, the single and album were released on Les Disques du Crépuscule.

== Track listing ==
1. "Never Give Up (Party Party)"
2. "Heartache" (Party Mix)

"Never Give Up (Party Party)", Belgian 7" single sleeve

== Chart performance ==
| Chart (1983) | Peak position |
|---|---|
| UK Singles (OCC) | 96 |
