= European Sun =

Compilation album by Paul Haig
- Released: 1988
- Recorded: 1982–1987
- Genre: Synthpop
- Label: Les Disques Du Crepuscule
- Producer: Paul Haig

Paul Haig chronology
The Warp Of Pure Fun (1986)	European Sun (1988)	Chain (1989)

Professional ratings
Review scores
Source	Rating
New Musical Express	7/10

European Sun is a compilation of rare and unreleased tracks by former Josef K vocalist, Paul Haig. The album was released in 1988 on Belgian independent label Les Disques Du Crepuscule.

Interspersed between the rare a-sides and b-sides are tracks from Haig’s unreleased album, shelved by Island Records in 1985. Several tracks recorded during the Island sessions did, however, appear on the 1986 album The Warp Of Pure Fun.

Also included is the unreleased collaboration with Sheffield’s Cabaret Voltaire and a home demo, "Psycho San Jose".

In 2004, LTM released another compilation of rare material, Then Again; this duplicated several tracks from European Sun.

== Track listing ==
1. Running Away
2. Chance
3. Justice
4. Swinging For You
5. Shining Hour
6. Blue For You
7. Ghost Rider
8. Torchomatic
9. Endless Song
10. Closer Now
11. Dangerous Life
12. The Executioner
13. Psycho San Jose
14. On This Night Of Decision
15. World Raw
