= Turn On, Tune In, Cop Out =

1993 single by Freak Power

Single by Freak Power

from the album Drive-Thru Booty
- B-side: "Getting Over the Hump"
- Released: 4 October 1993; 6 March 1995 (re-release)
- Genre: Acid jazz
- Length: 4:20
- Label: 4th & B'Way
- Songwriter: Norman Cook
- Producers: Norman Cook; Ashley Slater

Freak Power singles chronology
"Turn On, Tune In, Cop Out" (1993)	"Rush" (1994)

"Turn On, Tune In, Cop Out" is a song by English musician and DJ Norman Cook's acid jazz group Freak Power, released in October 1993 by 4th & B'Way as the lead single from their first album, Drive-Thru Booty (1994). The song features a smooth jazz sound and the baritone vocals of lead singer Ashley Slater. The single originally charted at number 29 in the United Kingdom. However, two years later, the song was used in the popular Levi's advertisement "Taxi", and it was re-released on 6 March 1995. This time, the single was a success, reaching number three on the UK Singles Chart and becoming the group's only top-20 hit. The song was also a moderate hit in western Europe and New Zealand.

== Critical reception ==
Caroline Sullivan from The Guardian described the song as "a cynical post-modern shopping anthem with a dash of singalong soul." In October 1993, in his weekly UK chart commentary, James Masterton stated that the song had "the potential to be a major hit". Upon the 1995 release, a reviewer from Music Week commented, "Levi's ads have a habit of spawning Top 10 hits and Freak Power's groovy number is set to become the latest." NME's review said, "Stuffed with vocals that croakily doff their cap to Sly Stone, wah-wah guitar and a chorus that seems to be fully aware of its '70s-crazed ludicrousness, it's an insidious rare groove drip-feed that'll soon be connected to the veins of thousands."

Andy Beevers wrote in the Record Mirror Dance Update, "With his excellent Mighty Dub Cats and Pizzaman projects, Norman Cook has been sending out low-key signals that something is stirring down in Brighton. Now comes the real deal. The best starting point is the Radio Mix which emphasises the wonderfully mellow and husky male vocal. The weird trippy lyrics, which are nowhere as corny as the title would suggest, are set against a great bassline and plenty of funky touches. The whole thing has a very Seventies feel but it is done with a great deal more understanding and intelligence than all the current disco pastiches." Another Record Mirror editor, James Hamilton, described it as "Norman Cook's Gil Scott Heron-ishly crooking jaunty excellent Donny Hathaway 'The Ghetto' based" in his weekly dance column. Garry Mulholland from Select wrote, "Their 'Turn On, Tune In, Cop Out' provides the low-slung funk backing for that ad's shameless exploitation of shock-horror transexuality."

== Music video ==
The accompanying music video for "Turn On, Tune In, Cop Out" was directed by Nigel Simpkiss and produced by Ted Thornton for Swivel Productions. It was released on 4 October 1993 and in the video a fleet of beach buggies cruise the surf in Camber Sands. The video was A-listed on French music television channel MCM in March 1995. It also received active rotation on MTV Europe and was B-listed on Germany's VIVA.

== Track listings ==
- CD maxi 1, 12-inch maxi 1
1. "Turn On, Tune In, Cop Out" (radio mix) – 4:21
2. "Turn On, Tune In, Cop Out" (Pizzaman mix) – 6:51
3. "Getting Over the Hump" – 4:12
4. "Turn On, Tune In, Cop Out" (Play-Boys fully loaded vocal) – 7:27
- CD maxi 2
1. "Turn On, Tune In, Cop Out" (radio mix) – 4:20
2. "Turn On, Tune In, Cop Out" (T-empo's club mix) – 7:35
3. "Turn On, Tune In, Cop Out" (Playboys reloaded dub) – 6:22
4. "Turn On, Tune In, Cop Out" (T-empo's piano dub) – 8:25
5. "Turn On, Tune In, Cop Out" (Pizzaman mix) – 6:50
- 12-inch maxi 2
1. "Turn On, Tune In, Cop Out" (album version)
2. "Turn On, Tune In, Cop Out" (T-Empo's club mix)
3. "Turn On, Tune In, Cop Out" (Play-Boys reloaded dub)
4. "Turn On, Tune In, Cop Out" (T-Empo's piano dub)
- 7-inch single, CD single, cassette
1. "Tune On, Tune In, Cop Out" (radio mix) – 4:19
2. "Getting Over the Hump" – 4:12

== Personnel ==
- Writer – Norman Cook
- Backing vocals – Lucy the Fly
- Bass – Jesse Graham
- Bongos – Bongo Pete
- Drums – James Carmichael Jr
- Guitar – Norman Cook
- Organ – Eddie Stevens
- Photography – Tynan the Skyman
- Trombone, vocals – Ashley Slater
- Producer – Norman Cook

== Charts ==
=== Weekly charts ===
Chart (1993)	Peak position
Europe (Eurochart Hot 100)	99
Europe (European Dance Radio)	22
UK Singles (Official Charts)	29
UK Airplay (Music Week)	18
UK Dance (Music Week)	11
UK Club Chart (Music Week)	14

Chart (1995)	Peak position
Belgium (Ultratop 50 Flanders)	26
Belgium (Ultratop 50 Wallonia)	28
Europe (Eurochart Hot 100)	11
Europe (European Dance Radio)	4
Europe (European Hit Radio)	5
France (SNEP)	33
Germany (GfK)	21
Iceland (Íslenski Listinn Topp 40)	5
Ireland (IRMA)	4
Netherlands (Dutch Top 40)	21
Netherlands (Single Top 100)	23
New Zealand (Recorded Music NZ)	17
Scottish Singles Sales (Official Charts)	4
Switzerland (Schweizer Hitparade)	36
UK Singles (Official Charts)	3
UK Dance (Official Charts)	9
UK Hip Hop/R&B (Official Charts)	1
UK Airplay (Music Week)	1
UK Club Chart (Music Week)	28
UK Pop Tip Club Chart (Music Week)	25

=== Year-end charts ===
Chart (1995)	Position
Europe (European Hit Radio)	21
Germany (Media Control)	93
Iceland (Íslenski Listinn Topp 40)	32
Latvia (Latvijas Top 50)	66
UK Singles (OCC)	64
UK Airplay (Music Week)	8

== Certifications ==
Region	Certification	Certified units/sales
United Kingdom (BPI)	Silver	200,000^{^}
^{^} Shipments figures based on certification alone.

== Release history ==
Region	Date	Format(s)	Label(s)	Ref.
United Kingdom	4 October 1993	7-inch vinyl; 12-inch vinyl; CD; cassette	4th & B'Way	
United Kingdom (re-release)	6 March 1995	7-inch vinyl; 12-inch vinyl; CD; cassette	4th & B'Way	
Australia	3 April 1995	CD; cassette	4th & B'Way; Island; Mercury	
