= Shipwreck (album) =

Studio album by Chris Connelly
- Released: 1994
- Genre: Art rock
- Label: Wax Trax!/TVT
- Producer: The New Pain

Chris Connelly chronology
| Phenobarb Bambalam (1992) | Shipwreck (1994) | Songs for Swinging Junkies (1994) |

Shipwreck is an album by the Scottish musician Chris Connelly, released in 1994. It continued Connelly's move away from industrial music. Connelly supported the album by touring with Low Pop Suicide.

== Production ==
The album was produced by the New Pain. It was recorded in the wake of the suicide of Connelly's girlfriend, and dealt with Connelly's reevaluation of his life after the excesses of his twenties; Connelly had taken an 18-month break from music before entering the studio. The backing band included Ministry members Bill Rieflin and William Tucker. "The Early Nighters" is dedicated to River Phoenix.

== Critical reception ==
Professional ratings
Review scores
| Source | Rating |
|---|---|
| AllMusic | 4/5 stars |
| Chicago Tribune | 3.5/4 stars |
| MusicHound Rock: The Essential Album Guide | 4.5/5 stars |
| The Province | 3/4 stars |

Rolling Stone stated: "Its music gorgeous, its lyrics strange, confessional and sometimes oddly comic, Shipwreck is a stunning album—a furious attempt to fashion something glorious." Trouser Press wrote that "Connelly's pronounced vocal resemblance to Bowie remains disarming throughout Shipwreck's eleven fascinating chapters, but as long as the real thing shows no inclination of creating music this affecting and accessible, Connelly might as well make the most of it." The Baltimore Sun deemed Shipwreck an "amiably upbeat album recalls the arty appeal of late-'70s David Bowie."

The Chicago Tribune called the album "a masterful blend of creepy atmospherics, the odd noise, visceral guitars-and-drums interplay and folkish melodies-delivered in Connelly's evocative, brogue-tinged tenor." The St. Louis Post-Dispatch thought that Shipwreck "ditches the industrial shtick for a near art/rock approach." The Los Angeles Times opined that, "even among the obvious Bowie-isms, there was enough sense of personal vision to indicate that Connelly can transcend the reference and stake out territory distinctly his own."

AllMusic wrote that "most of the songs have a sharp acoustic/electric guitar kick and at once rough and carefully produced feel to them." MusicHound Rock: The Essential Album Guide deemed Shipwreck "one of the great, overlooked albums of the decade."

== Track listing ==
| No. | Title | Length |
|---|---|---|
| 1. | "Candyman Collapse" |
| 2. | "Spoonfed Celeste" |
| 3. | "What's Left but Solid Gold?" |
| 4. | "Detestimony III" |
| 5. | "Anyone's Mistake" |
| 6. | "Drench" |
| 7. | "The Early Nighters" |
| 8. | "Swimming" |
| 9. | "Model Murmur" |
| 10. | "Meridian Afterburn" |
| 11. | "Shipwreck" |
