= Surrender (Paul Haig song) =

1993 single

Single by Paul Haig
- Released: 1993
- Recorded: 1989
- Genre: Synthpop
- Label: Les Disques Du Crepuscule
- Songwriters: Martin Rev, Alan Vega
- Producer: Paul Haig

Paul Haig singles chronology
"Flight X" (1991)	"Surrender" (1993)	"Listen to Me" (1998)

"Surrender" is a 1993 single by Paul Haig, and his last single to appear on the Belgian independent label, Les Disques Du Crepuscule. It was released on 5" CD in March 1993.

The single was culled from the then recent Coincidence vs Fate album. It is a cover of the Suicide song and was written by Martin Rev and Alan Vega.

The extra tracks on the CD were an instrumental, "Coincidence vs Fate", which did not appear on the album (though is included as an extra track for the LTM 2003 reissue) and a re-working of an older Paul Haig single, "Heaven Help You Now", renamed "Heaven Help You Now '93". This version was remixed in New York City by Mantronik.

== Track listing ==
1. "Surrender"
2. "Heaven Help You Now '93"
3. "Coincidence vs Fate"
