= Finitribe =

Scottish electronic music group

- Also known as: Lost It.Com
- Origin: Edinburgh, Scotland
- Genres: Electronic; industrial; acid house; trance; post-punk
- Years active: 1982–1998
- Past members: David Miller; Philip Pinsky; John Vick; Simon McGlynn; Andy McGregor; Chris Connelly

Finitribe were a Scottish electronic music group. The group was originally referred to as Fini Tribe. The name was taken from finny tribe, a term used by the Rosicrucians to describe the fishes.

== History ==
The band formed in Edinburgh, Scotland, in 1982, by Chris Connelly, John Vick, Andy McGregor, Philip Pinsky, David Miller and Simon McGlynn. Initially a post-punk guitar outfit, the band released a debut EP Curling and Stretching on their own Finiflex label in the summer of 1984, graduating to their first John Peel Session in 1985, before rethinking their whole approach in the mid 1980s.

Tired of the conventional drums, bass and guitar set up, they acquired a sampler and began experimenting with electronic music. The result was Let The Tribe Grow, an EP released on the Glasgow label Cathexis and featuring "De Testimony", a seminal dance floor anthem for the original Balearic/Acid House generation. Subsequently, they signed to Chicago label Wax Trax and released two singles, "I Want More" (a cover of the Can song) and "Make it Internal", raising their profile in the States and resulting in extensive radio and club success. A long and arduous "toilet" tour of the UK in 1988 led to the departure of three members – including Connelly who relocated to the States and joined the Revolting Cocks and Ministry – and a parting of the ways with Wax Trax Records.

This in turn resulted in a resurrection of the Finiflex label and a distribution deal with Fast Forward for the-ir debut album, Noise Lust and Fun. The band was now made up of Pinsky, Vick and Miller along with various contributions from Little Annie, Rosanne Erskine and Wilf Plum. A series of remix EP's proved their electronic and dance floor credentials and brought indie chart success. The band met and signed a long-term publishing deal with Andy Heath (director of Beggars Banquet and Momentum Publishing), allowing the band to grow and develop without the constant need for advances from record companies.

After signing a new deal with One Little Indian the band with encouragement from label boss Derek Birkett ran into controversy almost immediately with the Animal Farm EP. Subverting the nursery rhyme "Old MacDonald" for the purposes of berating the similarly titled hamburger outlet, Finitribe (as they were now known) offered up a flavour of the anti-consumerist stance prevalent on new album Grossing 10k (1989). The subsequent threat of legal action was not exactly helped by a "Fuck off McDonald's" poster and T-shirt campaign.

The band continued to develop stronger links with the electronic music world for their next single and album. Andrew Weatherall produced and remixed the single "101" (1991) along with Graham Massey from 808 State. Justin Robertson then worked with the band to remix and produce the singles "Ace Love Deuce" and "Forevergreen" (1992). Youth also remixed "Forevergreen". These singles all featured on the band's most critically and commercially successful album, An Unexpected Groovy Treat (1992), the last album they were to record for One Little Indian.

The success of this album allowed the band to re launch their 'Finiflex' label and the in-house production team recorded and released many singles including those by Justin Robertson, State of Flux, Ege Bam Yasi and Sparks. A Finiflex Compilation album And Away They Go was released to critical acclaim in 1993. The band was redeveloping their studio complex in Leith during this period and coordinated all management, recording, press and merchandise from there.

After leaving One Little Indian the band further developed their studio complex and looked for a new recording deal. With the assistance of Tom Watkins (Pet Shop Boys, East 17) the band negotiated a deal with Pete Tong at London/FFRR. This deal allowed for the completion of the state of the art recording studio in Leith and facilitated complete independence for the recording of their next album. For the writing and pre-production of the band's fourth album they relocated to a small crofting settlement called Sheigra, near Kinlochbervie, in the north west of Scotland. In 1994, the band released the single "Brand New" and, although a minor hit, the relationship with London/FFRR was cooling. A further single "Love Above" and the album Sheigra were released in 1995. The band followed this with a tour with Sparks and then their own headlining tour of the UK.

By early 1996, David Miller and Philip Pinsky split from John Vick, the former continuing with Finitribe and John Vick successfully continuing with the studio complex Finiflex. The slimmed down Finitribe, now operating from a house built on the side of a volcano, started a new label U.G.T and released an LP by Ege Bam Yasi. While looking for a new label and a new singer Finitribe went to Essex to work with former Prodigy collaborator Jason Byrne. The result was the EP Squelch and the meeting up with future producer Witchman (John Roome).

For a short while the band hooked up with Chas Smash (Madness) as manager, this indirectly led to a meeting with Korda Marshall and a deal was struck with Infectious/ Mushroom Records (home of Garbage and Ash). The band's fifth album Sleazy Listening was recorded in Edinburgh with John Roome (Witchman) producing. It featured Paul Haig, Little Annie, Niroshini Thambar, Chris Ross, John Roome and Katie Morrison. The album mixed electronica and live instrumentation and received critical acclaim. Melody Maker stating that, "If Finitribe had lived and worked in Bristol they would have won the Mercury Music prize by now".

The album was launched with a sell out gig at The Shooting Gallery, Edinburgh with Davy Henderson's Nectarine No. 9. The band toured the UK with their most successful gigs for several years, headlining the ICA in London. They recorded the first ever John Peel live session and released three further singles for Infectious.

This was the band's last album and tour - their last gig was at a sell out Bath Moles Club in the summer of 1998.

Other interests and priorities meant that Pinsky and Miller put Finitribe to one side. One more single was released, "Bored" (2000).

In January 2014, the band reissued "De Testimony" on limited 12" vinyl.

The band features in the book Postcards from Scotland detailing the 1980s and 1990s independent music scene in Scotland.

A compilation album of the band's early material is scheduled for release on 10 October 2025, entitled The Sheer Action of Fini Tribe: 1982-1987

== Finiflex ==
Vick developed the Finiflex recording studio, based in Leith. Providing high-end sound recordings for television, radio, sound design and advertising with clients including IKEA and Irn Bru. Vick joined with DJ Davie Miller to form the band Finiflex, releasing their first single Ta Ta Oo Ha in 2017, and the album Suilven in June 2018. The band supported Sparks at their Glasgow show in May 2018.

== Members ==
- David Miller (guitar/vocals/noise)
- Philip Pinsky (bass/vocals & production)
- John Vick (keyboards/sampling/production & editing, until 1996)
- Simon McGlynn (drums, until 1988)
- Andy McGregor (guitar/vocals/noise & pictures, until 1988)
- Chris Connelly (vocals/production, until 1988)

== Vegetarianism ==
A belief that the members of Finitribe were vegetarian was denied by David Miller in an interview in 2014. Miller said: "John is a vegetarian but that's it, and even he eats fish that he catches himself. I think it evolved from our run in with McDonalds, when we promoted our single Animal Farm with a poster explicitly telling them to FUCK OFF. Personally I will always love a bacon roll but I respect veggies' choice not to."

== Selected discography ==
- "Curling and Stretching" 12" EP (Finiflex 1984)
- "Let the Tribe Grow" EP (Cathexis 1986)
- Noise, Lust & Fun (Finiflex 1988, One Little Indian 1989)
- Grossing 10K (One Little Indian 1989)
- An Unexpected Groovy Treat (One Little Indian 1992)
- "Forevergreen" EP (1993) – UK No. 51
- "Brand New" (1994) – UK No. 69
- Sheigra (FFRR 1995)
- "Squelch" (1996)
- Sleazy Listening (Infectious 1998)
- The Sheer Action of Fini Tribe – 1982-1987 (Shipwrecked Industries 2025)

=== As Finiflex ===
- Ta Ta Oo Ha (Finiflex, 2017)
- Suilven (album) (Finiflex, 2018)
