= Whiplash Boychild =

Studio album by Chris Conneliy
- Released: 1 March 1991
- Recorded: 9 April–22 July 1990
- Genre: Rock; avant-garde
- Length: 60:44
- Label: Wax Trax!
- Producer: Chris Connelly; Keith Auerbach

Chris Conneliy chronology
Whiplash Boychild (1991)	Phenobarb Bambalam (1992)

Whiplash Boychild is the solo debut album by Scottish musician and singer-songwriter Chris Connelly, who is best known for his work for bands such as Ministry, The Revolting Cocks, and Pigface. It was released in 1991 through Wax Trax! Records. The album also features session contributions from drummer William Rieflin, and bass guitarist Stuart Zechman, who later reunited with Connelly on his next album, Phenobarb Bambalam (1992).

The record stylistically differs from Wax Trax!'s industrial music-indebted catalogue, incorporating influences from Scott Walker, David Bowie and Marc Bolan, as well as experimenting with avant-garde song structures. It takes its title from a lyric from the Velvet Underground song, "Venus in Furs".

== Critical reception ==
Professional ratings
Review scores
Source	Rating
AllMusic	3/5 stars

AllMusic critic Ned Raggett considered the record as "a commanding and often quite surprising solo effort of equal power and delicacy," and wrote: "Compared with Marc Almond's splashy theatrics, Connelly is a little more abstract and restrained, approaching his material with a certain calm." Raggett also thought that the album's production was "remarkably clear, without ever being sterile or losing the impact of the music." Ira Robbins of Trouser Press gave the album a positive review, stating: "An ambitious lyricist who doesn't quite have poetry within his reach, Connelly is an able, mannered singer with some intriguing ideas."

== Track listing ==
1. "Daredevil" – 5:10
2. "Ghost of a Saint" – 4:43
3. "This Edge of Midnight" – 6:49
4. "The Last of Joy" – 3:11
5. "The Amorous Humphrey Plugg" (Scott Walker) – 3:49
6. "Stowaway" – 3:52
7. "The Hawk, the Butcher, the Killer of Beauties" – 3:20
8. "The Game Is All Yours" – 5:04
9. "Confessions of the Highest Bidder" – 10:56
10. "Stowaway (Daydream Mix)" – 6:48
11. "This Edge of Midnight (Sparse Mix)" – 7:02

== Personnel ==
Album personnel as adapted from the album's liner notes.

- Chris Connelly – performer, producer, lyrics, cover art
- Keith Auerbach – producer
- Jessica Villines – performer, engineer
- Stuart Zechman – performer
- William Rieflin – performer
- Andy McGregor – performer
- Jim Marcus – performer
- Steve Albini – recording (3)
- Duanne Buford – programming (6)
- Die Warzau – mixing (10)
- Jeff Newell – engineer
- Gary Saunders – assistant engineer
- John Hachtel – assistant engineer
- Keith Mestle – assistant engineer
- Steve Levy – assistant engineer
- Brian Shanley – cover art
- Tom Young – cover art
