= Drive-Thru Booty =

Studio album by Freak Power
- Released: April 1994
- Labels: Island; 4th and Broadway
- Producers: Norman Cook; Ashley Slater

Freak Power chronology
Drive-Thru Booty (1994)	More of Everything for Everybody (1996)

Singles from Drive-Thru Booty
- 1. "Turn On, Tune In, Cop Out" Released: 1993; 2. "Rush" Released: 1994; 3. "Get in Touch" Released: 1994

Drive-Thru Booty is the debut album by British band Freak Power, fronted by musician, record producer and songwriter Norman Cook (later known as Fatboy Slim), singer, songwriter and trombone player Ashley Slater and vocalist Jesse Graham. It was released in April 1994.

== Singles ==
The album includes the singles "Turn On, Tune In, Cop Out", which originally reached number 29 in the UK Singles Chart in 1993, "Rush", which reached number 62 in 1994, and "Get in Touch" which reached number 88 that same year. "Turn On, Tune In, Cop Out" was re-released in early 1995 and became a much bigger hit when it reached number three in the UK Singles Chart.

== Critical reception ==
Professional ratings
Review scores
Source	Rating
AllMusic	4.5/5 stars
NME	8/10
Select	3/5 medals
Smash Hits	4/5 stars

John Perry from NME wrote that the album "is damn near the greatest fancy dress-party album... ever. It's a brilliant collection of uplifting smiley grooves [...] Drive Thru Booty is simply pure glittery pop, as smooth and shiny as Kojak in a pink turtleneck." Dan Glaister from The Guardian deemed it "wonderful, funky, drive-by, bubblegum pop." Jordan Paramor from Smash Hits named it Best New Album, saying, "This is the kind of music that has people in clubs sticking their bums in the air as their flares swing and their fingers point to the ceiling — but by golly it's great!" She highlighted tracks like "Big Time" and "Running Away".

== Track listing ==
No.	Title	Writer(s)	Length
1.	"Moonbeam Woman"	Norman Cook	4:48
2.	"Turn On, Tune In, Cop Out"	Cook	4:24
3.	"Get in Touch"	Cook; Ashley Slater	5:23
4.	"Freak Power"	Cook; Slater	3:55
5.	"Running Away"	Sylvester "Sly Stone" Stewart	4:05
6.	"Change My Mind"	Cook; Slater	4:29
7.	"What It Is"	Slater	4:50
8.	"Waiting for the Story to End"	Cook	3:53
9.	"Rush"	Slater	4:11
10.	"Big Time"	Cook	4:35
11.	"The Whip"	Cook	5:49

== Personnel ==
- Jim Carmichael – drums
- Norman Cook – guitar, bass, producer, vocals
- Jesse Graham – vocals
- Pete Eckford – percussion
- Cyril McCammon – keyboards, vocals
- Ashley Slater – producer, trombone, vocals
- Dale Davis – bass, guitars
- Simon Thornton – engineer

== Charts ==
Chart (1994)	Peak position
Austrian Albums (Ö3 Austria)	29
Dutch Albums (Album Top 100)	66
German Albums (Offizielle Top 100)	32
New Zealand Albums (RMNZ)	36
Scottish Albums (Official Charts)	33
Swiss Albums (Schweizer Hitparade)	31
UK Albums (Official Charts)	11
UK R&B Albums (Official Charts)	1
