= Cinematique 2 =

Studio album by Paul Haig
- Released: 2001
- Recorded: 2000
- Genre: Synthpop
- Label: Rhythm of Life
- Producer: Paul Haig

Paul Haig chronology
Coincidence Vs Fate (2001)	Cinematique 2 (2001)	Cinematique 3 (2003)

Cinematique 2 is the second in a series of three albums by Paul Haig, subtitled "Themes to Unknown Films". The album was released by ROL in 2001.

As with the first Cinematique album released in 1991, this second set is divided into three suites: Paradise Firefly, AppleCorr and Looking.

== Track listing ==
1. "Paradise Angel"
2. "Syncro Firefly"
3. "Wild Sync Lair"
4. "Apple Corr"
5. "Corr 2"
6. "Oyster World
7. "Looking"
8. "I.D."
9. "Jewel Divine"
10. "Spirit"
