= Rhythm of Life =

Studio album by Paul Haig
- Released: November 1983
- Recorded: 1983
- Studio: Sigma Sound (New York City); RAK (London)
- Genre: New wave; synth-pop
- Length: 36:22
- Label: Island; Les Disques du Crépuscule
- Producer: Alex Sadkin; Paul Haig

Paul Haig chronology
Rhythm of Life (1983)	The Warp of Pure Fun (1986)

Singles from Rhythm of Life
- 1. "Heaven Sent" Released: April 1983; 2. "Never Give Up (Party Party)" Released: July 1983; 3. "Justice" Released: October 1983; 4. "Blue for You" Released: 1983

Rhythm of Life is the debut studio album by the Scottish musician Paul Haig, released in November 1983 by Island Records. It was recorded at Sigma Sound Studios in New York City and RAK Studios in London with renowned record producer Alex Sadkin, known for his work on multiple albums by Grace Jones, and Thompson Twins. The album features guest musicians such as Bernie Worrell of Parliament-Funkadelic, Anton Fier of the Feelies and the Golden Palominos, and Tom Bailey of Thompson Twins. Four singles were released from Rhythm of Life: "Heaven Sent", "Never Give Up (Party Party)", "Justice" and "Blue for You". The track "Adoration" was originally performed while Haig was still a member of the post-punk band Josef K. The album spent 2 weeks on the UK Albums Chart, peaking at No. 82.

In 2004, LTM remastered and re-issued the album on CD for the first time with five bonus tracks taken from the 1984 mini album Rhythm of Life Remixes. These are extended dance remixes by New York disc jockey (DJ) Bruce Forest. The same track listing was issued again in 2014 on Les Disques du Crépuscule.

== Critical reception ==
Professional ratings
Review scores
Source	Rating
AllMusic	2.5/5 stars

In a retrospective review for AllMusic, critic Ned Raggett described the album as "something of a strained effort, finding Haig coming to grips with his dancefloor aspirations but not quite hitting the bull's-eye." Adding that "he often sounds like a guest on his own record -- the exception, besides his singing, being his recognizable guitar parts, though often they are buried in the arrangements. His voice frankly sounds unpleasant as well."

== Track listing ==
All tracks are written by Paul Haig, except where noted.

Side one
No.	Title	Music	Length
1.	"Heaven Sent"		3:57
2.	"Never Give Up (Party Party)"		3:24
3.	"Adoration"	Jack Waldman	3:00
4.	"Stolen Love"		4:41
5.	"Don't Rush In"	James Locke	3:56

Side two
No.	Title	Music	Length
6.	"Blue for You"	James Locke	4:36
7.	"In the World"		4:23
8.	"Justice"		4:19
9.	"Work Together"		4:06
Total length:			36:22

Bonus tracks on the 2004 re-release
No.	Title	Length
10.	"Heaven Sent" (Remix)	6:00
11.	"Blue for You" (Remix)	7:15
12.	"Never Give Up" (Remix)	6:14
13.	"Stolen Love" (Remix)	5:35
14.	"Justice" (Remix)	5:10

== Personnel ==
Credits are adapted from the Rhythm of Life liner notes.

Musicians

- Paul Haig – lead and backing vocals; guitars; drum machine programming
- Jack Waldman – keyboards; drum machine programming
- Bernie Worrell – keyboards
- Tom Bailey – keyboards; percussion
- Anton Fier – percussion
- Mike Nocito – percussion
- JS Subera – percussion
- Tina Baker – backing vocals
- Nikki Lauren – backing vocals
- Karen Brown – backing vocals

Production and artwork

- Alex Sadkin – producer
- Paul Haig – producer; sleeve concept
- Phil Thornalley – engineer
- John Potoker – engineer
- John Dent – mastering engineer
- Sheila Rock – photography

== Charts ==
Chart	Peak position
UK Albums (OCC)	82
