= Runnin' Away (Sly and the Family Stone song) =

Song by American band Sly and the Family Stone in 1972

Single by Sly and the Family Stone

from the album There's a Riot Goin' On
- B-side: "Brave & Strong"
- Released: February 5, 1972
- Recorded: 1970
- Genre: Funk; soul; pop
- Length: 2:51
- Label: Epic
- Songwriter: Sylvester Stewart
- Producer: Sly Stone

Sly and the Family Stone singles chronology
"Family Affair" (1971)	"Runnin' Away" (1972)	"(You Caught Me) Smilin'" (1972)

"Runnin' Away" is a song by American band Sly and the Family Stone. It was released as a single in early 1972 and appears on their 1971 album, There's a Riot Goin' On. The song reached No. 23 on the U.S. Billboard Hot 100 and No. 15 on the Best Selling Soul Singles chart. Outside the U.S., "Runnin' Away" reached No. 17 on the UK Singles Chart.

Record World said that "though Sly the lead vocalist is not much in evidence here, Sly the innovator, the driving force, is omnipresent".

== Paul Haig version ==
"Running Away"

Single by Paul Haig
- B-side: "Time"
- Released: May 1982
- Recorded: 1982
- Genre: Synth-pop
- Label: Operation Twilight
- Songwriter: Sly Stone
- Producer: Paul Haig

Paul Haig singles chronology
"Running Away" (1982)	"Justice" (1983)

In 1982, Scottish musician and former Josef K lead singer Paul Haig recorded his version of "Running Away". It was released as his debut single and reached No. 19 on the UK Indie Chart.

In Belgium, it was released on the independent record label, Les Disques Du Crepuscule.

=== Track listing ===
1. "Running Away"
2. "Time"

== Other cover versions ==
- It was later covered by artists such as the Raincoats, the Colourfield (whose version peaked at No. 84 in the UK), R. Stevie Moore and by Freak Power on their debut album Drive-Thru Booty.
