= Freak Power (band) =

United Kingdom band

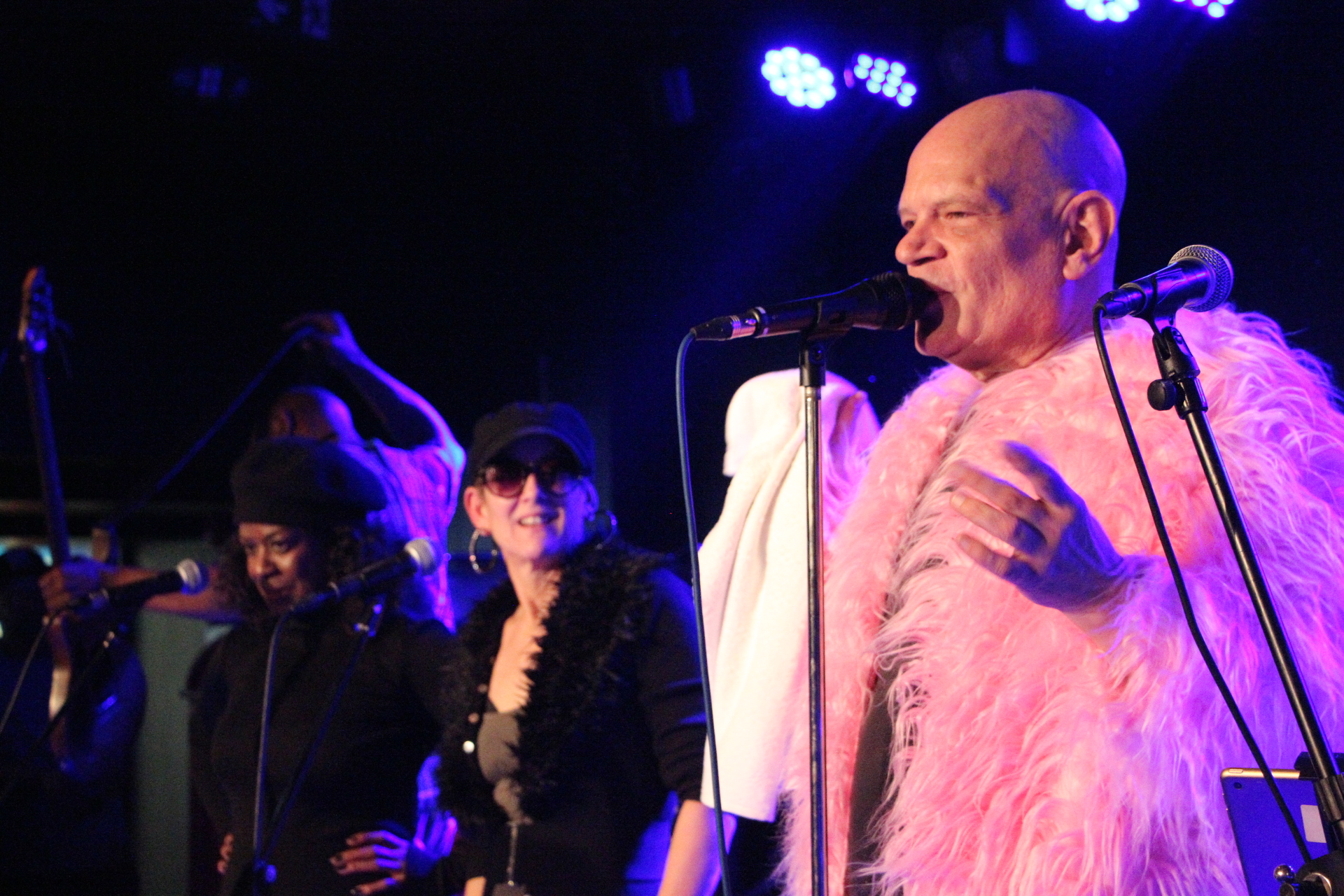
- Freak Power performing in 2024

Background information
- Origin: United Kingdom
- Genres: Acid jazz, funk, soul, trip hop
- Years active: 1993–1996, 1998–1999, 2024
- Label: Island
- Past members: Norman Cook; Ashley Slater; Jesse Graham

Freak Power was a band founded by bassist Norman Cook (later known as Fatboy Slim), Ashley Slater (vocalist and trombonist), and backing vocalist Jesse Graham. Their music was a mix of acid jazz, funk, soul, and trip hop. Although not credited, the London-based session bass player Dale Davis recorded bass and guitar on their debut album Drive-Thru Booty.

== Discography ==
The single "Turn On, Tune In, Cop Out" was a minor hit on the UK Singles Chart when released in 1993. There was renewed interest in the track after TV exposure in the 1995 Levi's jeans television advert "Taxi" directed by Baillie Walsh.

The band released two albums: Drive-Thru Booty in 1994 and More of Everything for Everybody in 1996. The debut album featured the hit singles "Turn On, Tune In, Cop Out" and "Rush", released on 4th and Broadway. The title of the former is a play on Timothy Leary's "Turn on, tune in, drop out".

"Song #6" from the band's follow-up album was featured in the 2004 movie Code 46. The song "Waiting for the story to end" was used in a Norwegian beer commercial in the 1990s, for a beer from the E.C Dahls brewery in Trondheim.

=== Studio albums ===
Title	Album details	Peak chart positions						
Title	Album details	UK	AUT	GER	NED	NZ	SCO	SWI
Drive-Thru Booty	Released: 8 April 1994; Label: 4th & Broadway (#BR606); Formats: LP, CS, CD	11	29	32	66	36	33	31
More of Everything for Everybody	Released: 22 June 1996; Label: 4th & Broadway (#BR619); Formats: LP, CS. CD	100	—	—	—	—	—	34
"—" denotes items that did not chart or were not released in that territory.

=== Compilation albums ===
Title	Album details
Turn On, Tune In, Cop Out	Released: 2000; Label: Spectrum Music (#544 274-2); Formats: CD

=== Singles ===
Year	Title	Peak chart positions										Certifications	Album
Year	Title	UK	BEL	EUR	FRA	GER	IRE	NED	NZ	SCO	SWI	Certifications	Album
1993	"Turn On, Tune In, Cop Out"	29	—	99	—	—	—	—	—	—	—		Drive-Thru Booty
1994	"Rush"	62	—	—	—	—	—	—	—	—	—		Drive-Thru Booty
1994	"Get in Touch"	88	—	—	—	—	—	—	—	—	—		Drive-Thru Booty
1995	"Turn On, Tune In, Cop Out" (re-issue)	3	26	11	33	21	4	23	17	4	36	UK: Silver	Drive-Thru Booty
1996	"New Direction"	60	—	—	—	—	—	—	—	68	—		More of Everything for Everybody
1996	"Can You Feel It?"	152	—	—	—	—	—	—	—	—	—		More of Everything for Everybody
1998	"No Way"	29	—	80	—	—	—	—	—	36	—		Non-album single
"—" denotes items that did not chart or were not released in that territory.
