= The Only Fun in Town =

Studio album by Josef K
- Released: 1981
- Recorded: April 1981, Brussels
- Genre: Post-punk
- Length: 29:23
- Label: Postcard Records
- Producers: Josef K, Marc François

Professional ratings
Review scores
Source	Rating
Allmusic	4/5 stars
Sounds	1/5 stars

The Only Fun in Town is a studio album by the indie Scottish post-punk band Josef K. It was recorded in Brussels and released in 1981 on Postcard Records, being the only album issued by the original iteration of that label.

== Track listing ==
Side A
No.	Title	Length
1.	"Fun 'n' Frenzy"	2:06
2.	"Revelation"	4:18
3.	"Crazy to Exist"	2:59
4.	"It's Kinda Funny"	3:30
5.	"The Angle"	2:43

Side B
No.	Title	Length
1.	"Forever Drone"	2:02
2.	"Heart of Song"	2:54
3.	"16 Years"	2:32
4.	"Citizens"	3:01
5.	"Sorry for Laughing"	3:13
