= The Only Truth (song) =

Single by Paul Haig

from the album The Warp of Pure Fun
- Released: 1984
- Recorded: 1984
- Genre: Synthpop
- Label: Les Disques Du Crepuscule
- Songwriter(s): Paul Haig, Martin Rev, Alan Vega (Ghost Rider)
- Producer(s): Paul Haig, Bernard Sumner, Donald Johnson

Paul Haig singles chronology
| "Big Blue World" (1984) | "The Only Truth" (1984) | "Heaven Help You Now" (1985) |

The Only Truth, Belgian 12" single sleeve

The Only Truth, UK 7" single sleeve

"The Only Truth" is the seventh solo single by Paul Haig. It was released in the UK on Island Records and licensed through Les Disques Du Crepuscule.

The track was co-produced by New Order's Bernard Sumner and Donald Johnson from A Certain Ratio. The B-side features a cover of Suicide's "Ghost Rider". This was also used as a B-side to his previous single, "Big Blue World".

In mainland Europe, the single was released on Les Disques Du Crepuscule.

In 2006, indie artist gnac used the Belgian sleeve for the album, Twelve Sidelong Glances. As with many sleeves on Les Disques Du Crepuscule, the artwork was designed by Beniot Hennebert.

== Track listing ==
1. "The Only Truth"
2. "The Only Truth" (Instrumental)
3. "Ghost Rider"
