= The Warp of Pure Fun =

The Warp Of Pure Fun

Studio album by Paul Haig
- Released: 1986
- Recorded: 1984/85
- Genre: Synth-pop
- Label: Les Disques Du Crépuscule
- Producer: Paul Haig, Alan Rankine, Bernard Sumner (The Only Truth)

Paul Haig chronology
Rhythm of Life (1983)	The Warp Of Pure Fun (1986)	European Sun (1988)

The Warp of Pure Fun is the second album by Paul Haig. After the release of Paul Haig's first album with Island Records, Rhythm of Life (1983), tracks were recorded for a follow-up during 1984, including the single "The Only Truth", produced by Bernard Sumner and Donald Johnson of A Certain Ratio. However, due to lack of sales for Rhythm of Life, Island Records unsigned Haig. Haig instead signed to Les Disques Du Crépuscule and finished the album in 1985.

"Heaven Help You Now" released as the second single and "Love Eternal" as the third single.

Produced with Alan Rankine, the album features live drums among other real instruments in place of programmed rhythm tracks, though without entirely abandoning club appeal. In the UK, The Warp Of Pure Fun appeared on another short-lived Crepuscule offshoot, Operation Afterglow, but while the album fared well as an independent release, Afterglow failed to propel it into the national chart.

Previously released on CD in Japan only, The Warp Of Pure Fun was fully remastered and re-released with bonus tracks by LTM in 2003, and again as part of a 4 CD box set in 2021.

== Track listing – 1986 release ==
1. Silent Motion
2. Heaven Help You Now
3. Love Eternal
4. This Dying Flame
5. Sense of Fun
6. Scare Me
7. Big Blue World
8. The Only Truth
9. One Lifetime Away
10. Love and War

== Track listing – 2003 release ==
1. Silent Motion
2. Heaven Help You Now
3. Love Eternal
4. This Dying Flame
5. Sense of Fun
6. Scare Me
7. Big Blue World
8. The Only Truth
9. One Lifetime Away
10. Love and War
11. Ghost Rider
12. Endless Song
13. Shining Hour
14. Trust
15. Dangerous Life
16. Closer Now
17. World Raw
