= Coincidence vs Fate =

Studio album by Paul Haig
- Released: 1993
- Recorded: 1989/90
- Genre: Synthpop
- Label: Les Disques Du Crepuscule, LTM
- Producer: Paul Haig, Lil Louis, Mantronik, The Chimes

Paul Haig chronology
Cinematique (1993)	Coincidence vs Fate (1993)	Cinematique 2 (2001)

Coincidence vs Fate is an album by Edinburgh musician Paul Haig. The album was released by Belgian independent label, Les Disques Du Crepuscule in 1993.

The album was originally recorded in New York City and Chicago in 1989. The album was financed by Virgin Records subsidiary Circa who had released Paul's previous album Chain. After the lead single, "I Believe in You", failed to make any impression on the charts, Circa decided to cut their losses and the album - to be called Right On Line - was shelved. As they had done in the past, Les Disques Du Crepuscule came to the rescue, stepped in and bought the rights.

The album has a very heavy Chicago house sound. Production credits include Lil Louis, Mantronik and The Chimes.

Coincidence vs Fate was re-released in 2003 by LTM. The re-released CD has different artwork to the original release and used the same image as Haig's 1990 single, "I Believe in You".

== Track listings ==
=== 1993 release ===
1. "I Believe in You"
2. "Flight X"
3. "Born Innocence"
4. "My Kind"
5. "Si Senorita"
6. "Right On Line"
7. "Out of Mind"
8. "Surrender"
9. "Stop & Stare"
10. "The Originator"
11. "1959"

Coincidence Vs Fate, LTM Re-release, 2003

=== 2003 release ===
1. "I Believe in You"
2. "Flight X"
3. "Born Innocence"
4. "My Kind"
5. "Si Senorita"
6. "Right On Line"
7. "Out of Mind"
8. "Surrender"
9. "Stop & Stare"
10. "Coincidence Vs Fate"
11. "Dub Organiser"
12. "The Originator"
13. "1959"
14. "Flight X (Long Flight Mix)"
15. "I Believe in You (Mix)"
