= Cinematique =

Studio album by Paul Haig
- Released: 1992
- Recorded: 1990
- Genre: Synthpop
- Label: LTM
- Producer: Paul Haig

Paul Haig chronology
Chain (1989)	Cinematique (1991)	Coincidence vs Fate (1993)

Cinematique is the first of three in a series of albums by Paul Haig, subtitled "Themes to Unknown Films". The album, which is divided into three "suites", was released by LTM in January 1992.

The suites are: City Of Fun, Lagondola and Flashback.

The album was re-released by LTM in February 2004. Artwork and track listing were identical to the original release.

== Track listing ==
1. "Black Veil and Gold"
2. "City Of Fun"
3. "Somewhere In between"
4. "The Hunting Party"
5. "Crime Interlude"
6. "City Of Fun (Slight Return)"
7. "Lagondola 1"
8. "Beauty"
9. "Highland"
10. "Deception"
11. "Intimacy"
12. "Lagondola 2"
13. "Flashback"
14. "Eastworld"
15. "In-Flight Entertainment"
16. "Oil"
