= Josef K (band) =

Scottish post-punk band

- Origin: Edinburgh, Scotland
- Genres: Post-punk
- Years active: 1979–1982
- Labels: Postcard Records; Les Disques du Crépuscule
- Past members: Paul Haig – Guitar, vocals Malcolm Ross – Guitar, Violin; David Weddell – Bass; Ronnie Torrance – Drums
- Website: Josef K (unofficial site); Josef K Facebook Page

Josef K were a Scottish post-punk band, active between 1979 and 1982, who released singles on the Postcard Records label. The band was named after the protagonist of Franz Kafka's novel The Trial. Although they released just one album while together and achieved only moderate success, they have since proved influential on many bands that followed.

== History ==
The band was formed in 1979 originally as TV Art by Paul Haig (vocals, guitar) and his childhood friend Ronnie Torrance (drums), later joined by Malcolm Ross (guitar, keyboards), with Gary McCormack added on bass guitar, who soon left (later joining The Exploited) with David Weddell replacing him. They disliked the name and were inspired to change it when they were asked at the last minute to open for Adam and the Ants at Clouds Ballroom on 20 July 1979 after the original opener dropped out.

After recording a ten-track demo, their first release was the "Romance"/"Chance Meeting" single on Orange Juice drummer Steven Daly's Absolute label in December that year. They were then signed to Postcard Records, the label founded by Daly and Alan Horne, releasing a string of critically acclaimed singles in 1980 and 1981. The band recorded their debut album, Sorry for Laughing, in 1981 at Castle Sound Studios in Pencaitland, but it was shelved, with the band unhappy with the clean, polished production, Haig describing it as sounding "flat and disinfected", with only a few copies being released. They returned to the studio in Belgium to record The Only Fun in Town, opting for a more 'live' sound and recording the whole album in two days, Haig later expressing a measure of regret that "we decided to make an almost unlistenable record with the vocals mixed down really low". It was their only album release while together, and while it placed well on the UK Independent Chart, it received a poor critical reception. Their earlier unreleased Sorry For Laughing album was eventually issued on a 1990 CD reissue of The Only Fun in Town and subsequently as its own vinyl LP in 2012 accompanied by a CD of TV Art's early demos.

The band played their last show on 23 August 1981 and split immediately after, Haig deciding to end the band as he felt they already had hit their peak. At the time Haig said, "The band had been together too long, we'd achieved all we'd set out to do and everything was in a rut—there was not room for new ideas." Their last release was the 1982 single, "The Farewell Single", through Les Disques du Crépuscule, which included the Peel session track, "The Missionary".

Torrance joined Boots for Dancing and later (with Weddell) formed The Happy Family with Nick Currie (aka Momus). Haig embarked on a long solo career, releasing a string of albums on his own Rhythm of Life label between 1984 and 2008, while Malcolm Ross joined Orange Juice and then played with Aztec Camera and Blancmange before embarking on a solo career. Ross and Weddell later reunited in Magic Clan. In 2025, Paul Haig and Malcolm Ross formed Land Surveyor, the band's name another nod to Kafka, and made their live debut on BBC 6Music on January 14, 2026.

== Musical style ==
Musically, they resembled their label mates Orange Juice in fusing post-punk guitars with funk and disco rhythms. They were influenced by American bands such as Pere Ubu, Television, Talking Heads, and The Voidoids, and British bands such as Subway Sect. However, in terms of their lyrics and image Josef K were always far more downbeat and austere than Orange Juice, and were never to match Orange Juice's commercial success. They were also described as sounding similar to Joy Division but "less doomy". Haig was a fan of Joy Division and "It's Kinda Funny" was inspired by the death of Ian Curtis. Haig's lyrics were also inspired by the works of Franz Kafka, Albert Camus, Hermann Hesse, Fyodor Dostoyevsky, and Knut Hamsun.

The band adopted what was described as an "anti-rock stance", most members eschewing drink and (most) drugs, and the band never doing encores, engaging in stage banter, or signing autographs, all of which Ross considered "patronizing".

== Influence ==
Josef K would prove to be a major influence on several later 1980s bands, including The June Brides and The Wedding Present (who also never do encores). They also influenced later bands such as Franz Ferdinand, The Futureheads, and The Rapture, and they were described in 2006 as "one of the most influential bands in Britain".

"Sorry for Laughing" was covered by German synth pop group Propaganda on their 1985 album A Secret Wish (and the remix album Wishful Thinking), and again in 2004 by French New Wave/bossa nova band Nouvelle Vague.

In an interview with Nardwuar the Human Serviette, British musician King Krule stated that Josef K created, "intelligent music and it's coming from a pure place, I think. Any music like, which is real, should get a listen to."

Several notable labels have reissued Josef K albums and compilations, including Creation, Domino and LTM Recordings. In 2014 Les Disques du Crépuscule issued remastered vinyl and CD editions of The Only Fun in Town. The history of Josef K is covered in 2015 documentary film Big Gold Dream, with Malcolm Ross featuring prominently as an interviewee.

== Band members ==
- Paul Haig – guitar, vocals, songwriting
- Malcolm Ross – guitar, violin
- David Weddell – bass
- Ronnie Torrance – drums

Original founding members included Neil Shah-Shah (guitar) and Matthew Cocks (bass).

All of their songs were written by either Paul Haig or Paul Haig/Malcolm Ross.

== Discography ==
=== Studio albums ===
	Year	Title	UK Indie Chart Position
June	1981	The Only Fun in Town	No. 3

=== Compilation and live albums ===
	Year	Title	UK Indie Chart Position	Notes
June	1987	Young and Stupid		(1979–1981 singles/session cuts, released with different track listing on CD in Sep 1990)
March	1989	Endless Soul	No. 7	(best of)
September	1990	Only Fun in Town		(contains the album "The Only Fun in Town" and the unreleased album "Sorry For Laughing" from 1980)
October	2002	Crazy to Exist		(live recordings from 1981)
September	2003	Live at Valentino's		(live recordings from 1981)
November	2006	Entomology		(mainly culled from Postcard and Les Disques Du Crepuscule 1980–81)
November	2012	Sorry For Laughing		First vinyl issue of their unreleased debut album (includes 12-track bonus CD of TV Art's original 1979 demo recordings)
May	2016	It`s Kinda Funny		Compilation of singles released between 1979 and 1982

=== Singles ===
	Year	Title	UK Indie Chart Position
December	1979	"Chance Meeting / Romance"	
August	1980	"Radio Drill Time / Crazy To Exist (Live)"	No. 27
December	1980	"It's Kinda Funny / Final Request"	No. 12
February	1981	"Sorry For Laughing / Revelation"	
May	1981	"Chance Meeting / Pictures (of Cindy)"	No. 12
February	1982	"The Missionary / One Angle / Second Angle" ¹	No. 5
Mar	1987	"Heaven Sent" ¹	No. 12

¹ post split
