= Paul Haig =

Scottish musician

- Born: 4 September 1960 (age 66)
- Origin: Edinburgh, Scotland
- Genres: Post-punk; alternative rock; synth-pop
- Occupations: Singer; songwriter; guitarist
- Instruments: Guitar; vocals
- Years active: 1979–present
- Labels: Les Disques du Crépuscule; Operation Twilight; Circa; Rhythm of Life; LTM
- Formerly of: Josef K
- Website: paulhaig.com

Paul Haig (born 4 September 1960) is a Scottish indie musician, singer and songwriter. He was originally a member of post-punk band Josef K, active between 1979 and 1982.

== Early life ==
Haig was born in Edinburgh, Scotland, and grew up in middle class Oxgangs. His father, Edward, was an owner of a fibreglass factory and his mother, Margaret, was a secretary for a dental practice. His earliest memories of music were listening to Beatles records on his parents’ Stereogram. Though not from a musical family, his father bought him his first guitar at age 12. On his father’s advice, he first learned to play by ear, humming the melody until he could work out the parts. After taking a few guitar lessons, he began to teach himself songs by artists like David Bowie and the Velvet Underground, recording himself on guitars and vocals playing their song The Gift. When he played it for friends in one of his first bands, they encouraged him to be the vocalist as they were too shy. His baritone vocal style was influenced by listening to Lou Reed and Jim Morrison at an early age. Haig later attended nearby Firrhill High School along with future Josef K bandmates Malcolm Ross, Ronnie Torrance (his neighbor since age 8) and original bassist Gary McCormack. He reconnected with Ross at a party a couple of years after they had left high school. While chatting, they discovered they shared similar tastes in music, particularly the Velvet Underground. They began to hang out soon after, listening to music and playing guitar which led them to form TV Art, soon renamed Josef K.

== Josef K, 1979-1981 ==
Haig was the lead vocalist of Josef K, an Edinburgh band, which recorded five singles 1979 and 1981 and an album (The Only Fun in Town) signed to the Postcard record label, before splitting in August 1981; their final Scottish date was in Glasgow. The break-up was due to a combination of excessive expectations, too little financial return, Haig's dislike of touring, and disagreements over future direction. The following year Haig told Johnny Waller in Sounds: "I was pretty depressed for a week because it was the end of an era, but after that I was really happy that we'd split, because I could get on with everything I wanted to do. I've lost a lot of the ideals I had in Josef K. About not wanting to be commercially successful, suffering for your art and all that. I want to be signed to a major and make a great record that will get radio airplay and be a big hit, then make my own money from that. I don't mind being manipulated to a certain extent to get what I want, but in time I want to control everything."

== Solo career, 1982 ==
With Postcard disintegrating in the wake of the Josef K split, Haig signed with the Belgian independent label Les Disques du Crépuscule for mainstream solo releases, and also adopted the moniker Rhythm of Life Organization (RoL) for a variety of side-projects. These included two interim singles on Edinburgh independent Rational, run by manager Allan Campbell. The first of these, Soon, was a collaboration with fellow Edinburgh musician Stephen Harrison (formerly of Metropak), while the second, Uncle Sam, saw Haig guesting on a record by artist Sebastian Horsley. Exploring territory first charted by Public Image Ltd and Heaven 17 in their BEF guise, both singles appeared as Rhythm of Life, this anonymity reflecting Haig's avowed dislike of personal publicity. Also via Rational, he released a limited edition (700 copies) cassette-only set of home-recorded electronica titled Drama, featuring Franz Kafka texts set to music, as well as a deconstruction of Josef K's Forever Drone.

In January 1982, Haig played his first solo live shows in Edinburgh and London as Rhythm of Life. At this stage Haig's new material was not so different from late-period Josef K songs such as "Heaven Sent", "Adoration" and "Heart of Song", though with a greater emphasis on a stripped-down funk style. Eschewing a live drummer in favour of a drum machine, RoL earned plaudits from the press, and in February 1982 took part in Crépuscule's first European package tour, Dialogue North-South, which also included the Durutti Column, the Names, Marine, Richard Jobson, Isabelle Antena and Tuxedomoon.

Haig relocated to Brussels in March 1982 where he embarked on an intensive recording schedule at Little Big One studio. This yielded two self-produced singles, "Running Away" and "Justice", as well as "Swing In '82", an EP of big band standards. After four months Haig tired of Belgium and returned home to Edinburgh. in May 1982, "Running Away", a cover of the Sly and the Family Stone classic, appeared on Crépuscule and reached number 19 on the UK Independent Chart, its success unhampered by the simultaneous release of another version by the Raincoats.

The follow-up single, "Justice", was shelved after Crépuscule signed a licensing deal with major label Island Records. 7-inch test pressings (TWI 100) survive, as does a separate 12" release featuring two club mixes of the song "Blue for You".

In July 1982, almost a year after the Josef K split, and with just one proper solo single to his name, Haig was labelled "the face and sound of 1982" by Paul Morley in a lead feature for the NME. According to Morley, Haig was the "enigmatic fourth man" in a New Pop quartet which also included Billy Mackenzie, Jim Kerr and Martin Fry, all of them deemed potential pop saviours in a parallel universe where Morley deemed Dollar "the most avant-garde group in the world". Even by Morley's standards the statement was hyperbolic, although the writer would later go some way towards validating it by directing ZTT signing Propaganda to cover Josef K's song "Sorry for Laughing" on their debut album A Secret Wish in 1985.

== Island Records, 1983-1984 ==
The media hype around Haig paved the way for a licensing deal with Island Records. At the close of 1982, Haig recorded his first album in New York with Alex Sadkin producing. Featuring a host of crack session players (including Bernie Worrell, Anton Fier and Jack Waldman), his new direction – polished club pop – sounded radically different from Josef K. The first single released from the album, "Heaven Sent" (a dance remake of an earlier Josef K song) stalled at No. 74 on the UK Singles Chart, and failed to provide Haig with the hit many had confidently predicted. The Rhythm of Life album appeared in October 1983 and was accompanied by a short seven date UK tour. Haig's touring group included Malcolm Ross on guitar, together with bassist David McClymont (also fresh from Orange Juice), drummer James Locke and former Associate Alan Rankine.

None of the three singles released from the album proved solid hits which might have allowed Haig to cross over to a wider audience. Island failed to release the album – or the singles – in America, although a slick "New York Remix" mini album was belatedly issued in 1984. Haig later recalled of this period: "The main thing was that I didn't want to be the centre of it all. The initial idea was just to keep working with different people under the name Rhythm of Life. But Island wanted a pop image to sell... and they didn't get one."

During 1984, Haig collaborated with a number of likeminded post-punk peers, recording electro track "The Only Truth" with Bernard Sumner of New Order and Donald Johnson of A Certain Ratio respectively, as well as the more experimental "The Executioner" with Cabaret Voltaire. In November he completed a second album, largely recorded in London with Alan Rankine co-producing. However the chart failure of "The Only Truth" as a single ultimately led to Island dropping Haig from their roster, and so the untitled second album was shelved.

== The Warp of Pure Fun, 1985-1987 ==
Rather than release the shelved set on Crépuscule, it was decided to combine the best material with several new songs written and recorded throughout 1985. Haig returned at the end of the year with the single, "Heaven Help You Now", and a reconfigured second album, titled The Warp of Pure Fun. Co-produced with Alan Rankine, it was a more involving collection than its predecessor, offering warmer songs and arrangements, and live drums in place of programmed rhythm tracks. In the UK the album appeared on short-lived Crépuscule offshoot, Operation Afterglow, and sold well as an independent release around Europe. Second single "Love Eternal" has been one of Haig's best regarded songs.

Haig spent most of 1986 writing new material and looking for a new major deal. He also found time to embark on a fruitful partnership with another Associate, Billy Mackenzie, the result being low key dates in Glasgow and Edinburgh, which mixed their own greatest hits with covers such as "Running Away" and Yoko Ono's "Walking on Thin Ice". Later the pair united to perform "Amazing Grace" on a Scots Hogmanay television programme, and each donated a song to the other's forthcoming album. "Chained" proved a highlight on the next Haig album, although Mackenzie's version of "Reach the Top" remained unreleased after the Associates' Glamour Chase project was shelved by WEA. Following Mackenzie's untimely death in 1997 an entire album of Haig/Mackenzie material, Memory Palace, appeared on Haig's own label Rhythm of Life.

In September 1987, Haig briefly returned to Crépuscule to record several tracks, resulting in the single "Torchomatic". This was followed by a compilation album called European Sun which including most of the shelved Island album not included on The Warp of Pure Fun plus several experimental b-side tracks and the previously unreleased Cabaret Voltaire collaboration.

== Chain, 'Right on Line', 1988 ==
In 1988, Haig financed the recording of a new album himself, once more produced with Alan Rankine, and eventually issued by Virgin offshoot Circa Records in May of the following year. The title track of Chain was co-written with Billy Mackenzie, while lead single "Something Good" remains a fan favourite. Live performances were limited to UK and included a showcase at the ICA in London on 18 May.

1988 also saw the release of a single credited to "Dub Organiser", this being a club cut recorded in collaboration with Allan Campbell and released as a one-off on Manchester indie label Play Hard.

Circa financed the recording of a new album produced in New York and Chicago by dance gurus Kurtis Mantronik and Lil Louis. Lead single "I Believe in You" featured additional mix work by the Chimes, whose drummer James Locke had been a periodic Haig collaborator since 1981. The album marked a return to the dance orientation of Rhythm of Life five years earlier, as Haig explained to Melody Maker: "The whole idea was to work with different producers and let them get on with it, which was a departure since I'd produced myself for so long. We recorded the stuff with Mantronik at his Sound Factory studio. He works very quickly, rattling stuff off in a couple of hours. He replaced all my beats with a combination of programming and breakbeats, mostly '70s funk stuff. Lil Louis took a completely different approach. He replaced the rhythm tracks on two of the songs and one we left as was He works with much more basic equipment – he's not as computerised as Mantronik. There was absolutely no sampling with Lil Louis, he's much more into the real musician school of thing."

Although "I Believe in You" achieved a measure of club success, Circa delayed releasing 'Right on Line' until a reworked "Flight X" (featuring rapper Voice of Reason) was issued. When two versions of this track stalled early in 1991 the album was shelved.

== Coincidence vs Fate and Cinematique, 1991 ==
In September 1991 Haig released an instrumental set of imaginary film themes through LTM, the label which had previously issued the Josef K back catalogue on CD. Cinematique comprised three distinct suites: City of Fun (noir jazz), Lagondola (ambient) and Flashback (electronica). In 1993, 'Right On Line' finally emerged as Coincidence vs Fate on Crépuscule, with two new tracks added.

== Rhythm of Life label years, 1999-present ==
Haig released two more volumes of Cinematique on his own RoL label, as well as several archive releases by his late friend Billy Mackenzie. Memory Palace (1999) compiled a number of tracks recorded as joint demos by the pair, as well as tribute single "Listen to Me". RoL would also release albums by Skyline and Subterraneans. In 2007, Haig's first single for 14 years, "Reason" (a BBC Radio 2 single of the week), was released and made available via download and on 7-inch vinyl. This was followed soon after by Electronik Audience which showcased Haig's influences from Kraftwerk and New Order to Cabaret Voltaire. In 2007, he made his first live appearance in many years when he joined Subterraneans onstage at a Billy Mackenzie tribute concert in London.

In April 2008, Go Out Tonight, a more organic album than Electronik Audience, was released. In it Haig returned to his guitar-roots, with tracks such as "Trouble Maker" very reminiscent of early solo recordings such as "Chance". In April 2008, Haig also embarked on his first tour since 1989, performing both old and new tracks at dates in Scotland and selected shows in Nottingham and London.

In December 2009, he released Relive, a studio collection which featured the song "Trip Out the Rider", later remixed for a 7" single release by Lemon Jelly founder Fred Deakin. In 2013, a more experimental electronic album Kube was issued on RoL, followed in 2014 by a comprehensive anthology of Crépuscule recordings titled At Twilight.

== Discography ==
- Drama (1981)
- Rhythm of Life (1983)
- The Warp of Pure Fun (1985)
- Chain (1989)
- Cinematique (1992)
- Coincidence vs Fate (1993)
- Cinematique 2 (2001)
- Cinematique 3 (2003)
- Electronik Audience (2007)
- Go Out Tonight (2008)
- Relive (2009)
- Kube (2013)
- The Wood (2020)

== Projects ==
- Dub Organiser was a one-off project featuring Allan Campbell with Paul Haig. The record was released as a 12" only single on Manchester label, Play Hard in 1988. Samples from the Dub Organiser tracks were used on Haig's 1989 album, Chain.
- In 2001, Haig performed vocals on an album by Justin Robertson entitled Justin Robertson presents Revtone – Haig's contribution is on the track "Crawling To You".
- In 2014, Haig sang on a remake of Joy Division's "Atmosphere" with producer Outernationale a.k.a. Derek Miller.
