= Dutch Punk =

Music subgenre

Dutch Punk, or Nederpunk, is a body of music that evolved in the Netherlands that encompasses the various styles of punk rock music. The culture surrounding punk rock is often strongly politically oriented; in the Netherlands, punk culture grew alongside, and was influenced by, the Dutch squatters' movement and other European squatters' movements. Few Dutch punk bands write lyrics in Dutch. However, as a small country, punk in the Netherlands has evolved with a unique mix of UK, US, European, and global punk influences.

== History ==
=== The beginning of punk in the Netherlands (1977-1979) ===
A seminal event for punk in the Netherlands was the Sex Pistols' concert on January 6, 1977, at the Amsterdam Paradiso. The Sex Pistols played three shows in the Netherlands on that tour, along with the Heartbreakers and the Vibrators. On May 1, 1977, the Damned gave a concert in the Paradiso. On May 11, 1977, the Ramones and Talking Heads gave a concert in the Rasa in the Pauwstraat in Utrecht. In October 1977, Iggy Pop performed on the popular television show TopPop with Ad Visser. On November 19, 1977, Blondie played at the Amsterdam Paradiso. At the end of 1977, the VARA television program Wonderland also highlighted punk in a theme broadcast including performances by the Stranglers in the Paradiso in Amsterdam and the Sex Pistols in Maasbree.

These concerts and performances by bands from the UK and USA led to an explosion of interest in punk in the Netherlands in 1977. Dutch punk bands and fanzines were rapidly established. In the audience of the Ramones' Utrecht concert were Rob and Erik de Jong, who formed the band Blitzkrieg, sometimes hailed as the first punk band in the Netherlands (Blitzkrieg quickly changed their name to The Duds). Two rock bands that predated punk, Ivy Green (formed in Hazerswoude-Dorp in 1975) and Flyin’ Spiderz (formed in Eindhoven in 1976), shifted to playing punk rock; these bands are often also discussed the first punk bands in the Netherlands. The lead singer for the Flyin' Spiderz, Guus Boers, had not heard punk before a concert of the Vibrators in early 1977 at the Technical University of Eindhoven. In August 1977, the popular fanzine KoeCrand was founded, inspired by the UK fanzine Sniffin' Glue. A second early Dutch fanzine Raket, associated with the Rotterdam punk scene and featuring the cult comic Red Rat, soon began being published, initially as a wall newspaper.

The first punk single released by a Dutch band was the song "Van Agt Casanova," released by Paul Tornado on the record label 1000 Idioten in 1977. This single was frequently played on the radio by the VPRO. This song references the Dutch Catholic politician Dries van Agt, who in 1977 required that pornographic films only be shown in cinemas with less than 50 seats, as a way to limit who could see such films. The first Dutch punk LP released was the self-titled album of the Flyin’ Spiderz, who opened for the Damned at their May 1977 show. Dutch punk bands from this period that were well known in the scene include the Speedtwins, Soviet Sex, Ivy Green, Jesus and the Gospelfuckers, Neo Punkz, Helmettes, the Filth, Tedje en de Flikkers, the Ex, The Suzannes, the Rondos, Panic, Subway, The Boobs, and Two Two 79.

The first Dutch punks gathered around record labels and clubs. One of these was Rotterdam's Huize Schoonderloo. A second club important to the early Dutch punk culture was Amsterdam's "DDT666" (Dirty Dutch Trix 666, later renamed Gallerie Anus), which was established by punk poet Diana Ozon and graffiti artist Hugo Kaagman; this club was located in the squat called the ‘Zebrahuis’ on Sarphatistraat in Amsterdam. The record label Plurex Records, founded by Wally van Middendorp (of the band the Tits, and later Minny Pops) in 1977, was also a hub of the early punk scene. The first record that Plurex put out was the Tits single "Daddy Is My Pusher / We're So Glad Elvis Is Dead", which is now regarded as a punk classic. In Amsterdam, early punks gathered at the music store and punk label "No Fun" on the Rozengracht, owned by Hansje Joustra. The inspiration for "No Fun" was the American punk club CBGB, which Joustra had visited. A third important Dutch punk record label, Torso Records, was also founded in this period by Dick Polak, Hans Joustra, and Peter Dispa.

=== 1980s ===
During this period the slogan "no future" (also discussed as doomdenken in Dutch) came to be used broadly in the Dutch punk scene, reflecting the economic and social situation of the times, including the high youth unemployment rate and the housing crisis. Punk music began to focus more on political and social issues, as reflected in song lyrics of the times. These issues often included ideas central to the squatters' movement as well as the anarchist movement. Frustrations boiled over, resulting in the coronation riots on April 30, 1980. The slogan geen wooning, geen kroning ("no home, no coronation") was chanted by many involved in the riot. The coronation riots marked the beginning of the greatest period of social unrest since WWII. Squatters' riots became more frequent and more violent. More than a year after the coronation riots, the anti-nuclear weapons demonstration of November 21, 1981 took place in Amsterdam. Although peaceful, the demonstration was massive: more than 400,000 people participated.

With this social backdrop, in 1980 the compilation album "Utreg Punx" was released; this album included the bands the Lullabies, The Nixe, Rakketax, and Noxious. The band Noxious was one of the first hardcore bands in the Netherlands, but existed only two years; they broke up in 1982 because of the violent death of their guitar player Ollie ten Hoopen. In 1981 two more compilation albums of Dutch punk were released. The first one was Onutrechtse Toestanden, which featured the Miami Beach Girls, and Dangerous Pyama's. The second one was the so-called "7,50 LP", which featured bands from several different Dutch cities: the Lullabies, the Bison Kidz, Zero-Zero, Neo-Pogos, the Rapers, and The Nixe. Other punk bands active in the Utrecht scene were the Clits (later Cold War Embryos), Coitus Int., De Megafoons, Pitfall, and Disorder, and a few years later The Avengers and Kikkerspuug. In 1981 the split album "Wielingen Walgt" was released with live recordings by The Nitwitz and Götterflies, recorded in the Amsterdam squat De Wielingen. A lively punk scene also emerged in the West Frisian town of Hoorn, where bands such as The Vernon Walters and Indirekt were active throughout the mid-1980s. From Heemskerk in North Holland, the hardcore band Union Morbide was active beginning in the mid-1980s. From the Groningen punk scene came bands like: Bloedbad, Jetset, Massagraf, Fahrenheit 451, and Vacuüm. At the end of 1982, the VARA produced a program for national television that broadcast bands such as: The Workmates, Soviet Sex and the Bizkids.

In the first half of the 1980s, youth centers were gradually becoming the center of the punk scene in the Netherlands. This included: Babylon in Woerden, Kaasee in Rotterdam, Simplon in Groningen, Stokvishal and the autonomous punk squat de Goudvishal in Arnhem, Doornroosje in Nijmegen, Chi Chi Club in Winterswijk, De Buze in Steenwijk, Bauplatz in Venlo, Tivoli in Utrecht, and Parkhof in Almaar. Parkhof was associated with the release of the compilation album Parkhof 11-4-81 which featured the Nixe, Rakketax, Bizkids, and others. The hardcore band Pandemonium, active during the period 1981-1987, was associated with the Bauplatz in Venlo. In the second half of the 1980s the Amersfoortse Grachtkerk (Kippenhok 1) and the Goudvishal in Arnhem became important hubs of the punk scene.

The straight edge movement grew in the Netherlands in the late 1980s and early 1990s and included bands like Lärm (later Seein Red), Profound (later Manliftingbanner), Betray, Crivits, Vitamin X, and Feeding The Fire. Elsewhere in the Netherlands, the ultra movement, a Dutch post-punk and art-punk scene, emerged in the early 1980s. Dutch bands playing in this genre include: Mekanik Kommando, Minny Pops, Nasmak, The Young Lions, and Fahrenheit 451.

=== 1990s ===
By 1991, the well-known saying "punk is dead" had already become fashionable. Ironically, throughout the 90s, more diverse genres of punk became popular in the Netherlands, including pop punk, fun punk, skate punk, emocore, and melodic hardcore. This led to a fragmentation and loss of cohesion of the punk scene. Significant Dutch bands founded or active during this period include: Kankerwelvaart, Misselijk, ASO (from Horst, 1996-1997), Roggel, Die Nakse Bananen, Heideroosjes, Travoltas, Antidote, Disturbance, I Against I, De Hardheid, the Hufters, Vitamin X, and Antillectual. Compilations of Dutch punk bands released during this period included the 1998 albums X-treem CD and Bits of Noise 2.

In the 1990s, a Dutch crust punk culture emerged as a reaction to the melodic and more pop-oriented punk bands that the Netherlands had at the time. Dutch crustie bands such as Fleas and Lice and Boycott toured Europe and the United States.

In the early 1990s, the punk band Human Alert was founded in Amsterdam, with illustrator Roel Smit as band member, among others. In 1996 a compilation CD was released with the first generation of punk bands (1977-1982) under the title: "I'm Sure We're Gonna Make It". In 1997, the Rotterdam record label Tocado Records (closed in 2010) was founded, and became known for its series of punk compilation cds named Heel Erg Punk. The first volume of this series featured bands like Debiele Eenheid, The Fuzzbrats, GuidingLine, and No-men. In 1998, the German label Vitaminepillen Records released the double album Groetjes uit Holland with, among others: Heideroosjes, Bambix, Uit De Sloot, De Gatbent, Brezhnev, Rat Patrol, N.R.A. (Niet Reëel Aanbod), and Jabberwocky. In 1999, the Red Ear Label released a Dutch Punk compilation "Schorremorrie - Nederpunk Compilatie 1" that included songs from, among others: Uit De Sloot, De Gatbent, The Outcasted Teens, Leedvermaak, and the Utrecht crust band Mihoen!.

=== 2000s ===
Around the year 2000, in the UK punk scene, a so-called post-punk revival occurred in the form of UK bands like The Libertines, Ikara Colt, Art Brut and McLusky. Also in the Netherlands, a few bands pursued a harder variant of indie rock, including Pfaff, Voicst, Avec Aisance (aka Avec-A, founded by Yuri Landman), Blues Brother Castro. In addition, pop punk bands achieved greater commercial success, including The Undeclinables, Bambix, Travoltas, and Human Alert. In the hardcore scene, the bands Gewapend Beton and the Bakfietsboys were founded and wrote music with Dutch lyrics. Hardcore band All For Nothing (active 2004-2017), in contrast, wrote music with English song titles and lyrics. The Rotterdam record label Stardumb Records, associated with the punk scene, was founded in 2000. In 2000, Out Of Step Records put out the Dutch punk compilation "Rats 'N Dikes" which included bands like Jabberwocky, Absconded, Rat Patrol, Crivits, and many others.

=== 2010s and 2020s ===
Beginning in 2010, the Amsterdam publishing house Lebowski began publishing a series of titles related to punk in the 1970s and 1980s. This series included works on music as well as punk culture, and biographies as well as archival work. In 2012, an exhibition entitled "God Save the Queen" about the period 1977-1984 was presented in the Centraal Museum in Utrecht, and described in a publication written with De Groene Amsterdammer. In 2016, to celebrate the 40th anniversary of punk in the Netherlands, the EYE Film Museum established a punk exhibit with daily performances by punk bands. Some of those bands appear on the compilation album "Fury!" connected with the exhibit. In 2016 the Melkweg also had an expo on Dutch punk. In 2017, Oscar Smit wrote and published a series of four books about the early years of punk in the Netherlands.

Punk and hardcore punk continue to be active musical scenes in the Netherlands. In 2018, Vitamin X toured North America. In 2020 the Heideroosjes released a new album with a single about the covid pandemic; in 2022 they toured the Netherlands. New Dutch punk bands founded in this period include: Rites (active since 2017), Hang Youth (active since 2015), Hometown Crew (active since 2016), March (formed in 2013, first album 2016), Deathtrap (active since 2016), Voidcrawler (active since 2019), St. Plaster (active since 2019), T.Gondii (active since 2021), and Arne S (active since 2022).

== Documentaries ==
- Punk Tegendraads 1976-1991 (1990), a documentary by Gérard Bueters
- Punk: Lang leve de lol (1996), a documentary by Alfred Broer
- VPRO Andere Tijden: Punk (2012)
- Jimmy Is Punk - The Story of Panic (2020)

== Literature ==
- Jerry Goossens and Jeroen Vedder. Het gejuich was massaal: Punk in Nederland 1976-1982. Stichting Popmuziek Nederland Uitgeverij, 1996. ISBN 90-5330-192-5
- M. Haas., SKG (Stads Kunst Guerrilla) (Amsterdam: Lebowski, 2010). ISBN 978-90-488-5240-6
- M. Haas., Dr. Rat. Godfather van de Nederlandse Graffiti (Amsterdam: Lebowski, 2011) ISBN 978-90-488-0851-9
- Dirk Polak. Mecano: een muzikaal egodocument. (Amsterdam: Lebowski, 2011) ISBN 978-90-488-5175-1
- H. Schellinx, Ultra. Opkomst en Ondergang van de Ultramodernen. Een Unieke Nederlandse Muziekstroming (1978–1983) (Amsterdam: Lebowski, 2012) ISBN 978-90-488-1240-0
- L. Jonker, No Future Nu. Punk in Nederland 1977–2012 (Amsterdam: Lebowski, 2012) ISBN 978-90-488-1121-2
- M. Haas, Bibikov for President. Politiek, Poëzie & Performance 1981–1982 (Amsterdam: Lebowski, 2012) ISBN 978-90-488-1122-9
- Oscar Smit. De Paradiso Punkjaren deel 1 1977, De Oerknal. Black Olive Press, Amstelveen, 2017. ISBN 978-90-72811-24-0
- Oscar Smit. De Paradiso Punk Jaren Deel 2: 1978, Het Jaar Van De Nederpunk. Black Olive Press, Amstelveen, 2018. ISBN 978-90-72811-25-7
- Oscar Smit. De Paradiso Punk Jaren Deel 3: 1979, Opkomst Van New Wave, Post-Punk en Poëzie. Black Olive Press, Amstelveen, 2019. ISBN 978-90-72811-26-4
- Oscar Smit. De Paradiso Punk Jaren Deel 4: 1979-1981 Nederpunk(s) En Ultra. Black Olive Press, Amstelveen, 2021. ISBN 978-90-72811-27-1
