= March (band) =

Dutch punk band

- Origin: Breda, the Netherlands
- Genres: punk rock, Hardcore Punk
- Years active: 2013-present
- Members: Fleur van Zuilen (vocals, guitar); Hermance Van Dijk (lead guitar); Jeroen Meeus (bass); Thomas Frankhuijzen (drums)
- Website: marchofficial.com

March is a Dutch punk band from the city of Breda in the Netherlands. March's music consists of melodic punk rock/hardcore, and has been compared to Petrol Girls and Antillectual. Their songs have addressed political issues including equal rights and climate change. March writes and plays songs with simple and straightforward English lyrics.

March has released three studio albums on indie labels. The first of these albums was on the Dutch punk label White Russian Records. Their second album was released on the German indie label Uncle M. Their third album was released on the German indie label Concrete Jungle Records out of Nürnberg.

The band was formed in 2013, after the previous bands of drummer Thomas Frankhuijzen and Fleur van Zuilen both broke up.

March's second album Set Loose was released in 2020 just before the covid19 pandemic began; the entire release tour had to be postponed for a year.

In 2022, lead singer Fleur van Zuilen released a solo album titled Velvia under her artist name Flora Skuller. This album consists of songs written during the pandemic.

In 2023, March released their third album Get In. This album was produced by Bart Hennephof, guitarist for the Dutch metal band Textures.

== Discography ==
=== Studio albums ===
1. 2016: Stay Put (White Russian Records)
2. 2020: Set Loose (Uncle M)
3. 2023: Get In (Concrete Jungle Records)

=== EPs and singles ===
- 2014: In The Air (EP, White Russian Records)
- 2016: Stand In Line (single, White Russian Records)
- 2019: Nothing Ever Really Dies (single, White Russian Records)
- 2019: Fear Of Roses (single, White Russian Records)
- 2023: All on red (single, Concrete Jungle Records)
- 2023: Second To Destroy (single, Concrete Jungle Records)

=== Samplers (selected) ===
- 2017: White Russian Records 2017 Sampler
- 2023: Ox Compilation #169
