= Sparks in a Dark Room =

Studio album by Minny Pops
- Released: May 1982
- Recorded: Late 1981
- Genre: Electronic; post-punk; ultra; cold wave; electropop; electronic dance; industrial
- Length: 35:28
- Label: Factory Benelux
- Producer: Minny Pops

Minny Pops chronology
Drastic Measures, Drastic Movement (1979)	''Sparks in a Dark Room'' (1982)	Poste Restante (1983)

Sparks in a Dark Room is the second studio album by Dutch experimental electronic post-punk/ultra band Minny Pops. After signing to Factory Benelux in 1982 following their "noisy" and "goofy" debut album Different Measures, Drastic Movement (1979), the band settled into a new, less aggressive sound featuring influences of industrial music and funk. Recording Sparks in a Dark Room in late 1981, the band headed for a more clinical and clean sound. Considered a high point of the ultra movement, the record features cold, electronic tones and darkly humorous lyrics from lead singer and songwriter Wally van Middendorp.

Released by Factory Benelux in May 1982, the album was not a commercial success but its critical standing has become increasingly positive. The album has since been regarded as a lost classic. Uncut described it as an "under-the-radar-masterpiece" whilst Careless Talk said it "places Minny Pops squarely within the realm of an early 80s interface that pitched accessible pop conveniences and electronic experimentation in the same arena." Today it is considered part of the origins of dark wave and industrial dance music. The album was remastered and re-released in March 2003 by LTM with numerous bonus tracks, and by Factory Benelux in March 2014 with even more bonus material, namely a live album recorded at the Melkweg in 2012.

== Background ==
Minny Pops were formed in Amsterdam in 1978 by vocalist Wally Van Middendorp. The band took their name from the primitive Korg drum machine which propelled their austere, post-punk rhythms and provocative live performances. The band made their recording debut in 1979 on the label Plurex, operated by van Middendorp himself. The three-track seven-inch single contained "Kojak," on which Van Middendorp impersonated Telly Savalas' TV character of the same name with lines like "If you make more money, you make fewer friends." Later on in the year, the band released their debut album Drastic Measures, Drastic Movement, showcasing the band's "lean, mechanical sketches and abrasive noise diversions." Brainwashed called it "a bizarre mix of noise, new wave, synth pop, and Yello-like cabaret goofiness. It is one of the most genuinely tweaked documents of DIY electro-pop, a record which to this day causes heads to be scratched in satisfying bewilderment."

Their earliest releases on Plurex and praise visa word of mouth lead to a record deal with independent post-punk record label Factory Records of Manchester, England, who gave the band the opportunity to work with Martin Hannett, producer of Joy Division and later early New Order. They subsequently became the first Dutch band to record a Peel Session for radio DJ John Peel's BBC Radio 1 show. After a handful of gigs in support of Joy Division and the release of a live EP, Minny Pops had officially joined the label, but during 1981 and 1982, bounced between Factory proper and Factory's secondary Factory Benelux division, run in Belgium. According to Brainwashed, "as the group's members acquired careers as record label executives (at Boudisque, Play it Again Sam, etc.), the music that they produced became more accessible, the noise nearly vanished, and recognizable industrial-funk genre trappings emerged." Subsequently, in their new musical style, they recorded their second album shortly after the deal with Benelux.

== Recording and musical style ==
"The Minny Pops were right in league with Joy Division, The Normal and Cabaret Voltaire. Sparks in a Dark Room is another uniquely electronic album to add to the canon of great music being offered up in the early 80s. They combine pulsing electronics with insistent, bass guitar, guitar noises out of the PiL songbook (when indeed guitar is even used) and keyboard melodies borrowed from sci-fi soundtracks straight from Tangerine Dream. This sound was all imbued with Wally's disembodied, remote, droning lead vocals - singing lyrics which are window dressing to the over all feel."

— Patrick of Gullbuy.com

The album was recorded by and self-produced by the band in late 1981. Recorded without a guitarist, Sparks in a Dark Room is therefore often said to sound unusually polished and layered, and has been described as a "lavish extension" of its predecessor, opting for a cleaner and more clinical synth-focused side and containing a "Cabaret Voltaire pulse and Wally van Middendorp's tongue-in-cheek dark monologues." According to the magazine Oor, Sparks in a Dark Room was "the modest high point of the Ultra-revival, the avant-garde postpunk movement of which Amsterdam was the center and Minny Pops the pioneers." The journalist described the album as more normal than its predecessor, and shows Middentrop "attempting actual singing," saying "the vibe became moody, and the sound (with its synth carpets in minor) merged nicely with Factory." The album was described by one critic as showing the band at the peak of being "creators of driving modern electronic dance music, redolent of DAF, Simple Minds and Moroder-era Sparks" whilst another said the album's "smooth sequencers and motorik rhythms [are] often redolent of Moroder, Kraftwerk and Cabaret Voltaire." The album is also said to exemplify the cold wave movement of the era, whilst the work of Hannett "presides over" the album.

"Dream", "Tracking", "Trance" and "A Feeling" all contain motorik rhythms whilst "Black Eye" and "Vital" are described as "eerie, twilit essays." All feature van Middendorp's literary, darkly humorous lyrics and ironic "Gregorian" vocal style. "A Feeling", pointed out by Gull Buy as a highlight, features a "post-Wire like (Colin Newman solo material etc.) melody", whilst the ninth track "Experience" possesses an ambience that has been compared with Gary Numan's best work, "but with completely different results thanks to the Minny Pops vocal style." The album's lyrics are darkly humorous, a departure from the decisively bleak lyrics of their contemporaries, and are often used to compel the songs to a "pulsing electronic climax." Every so often lyrics can be heard, such as in "Crack": "This is a new religion....for people who had it all...for people who lost it all."

== Release ==
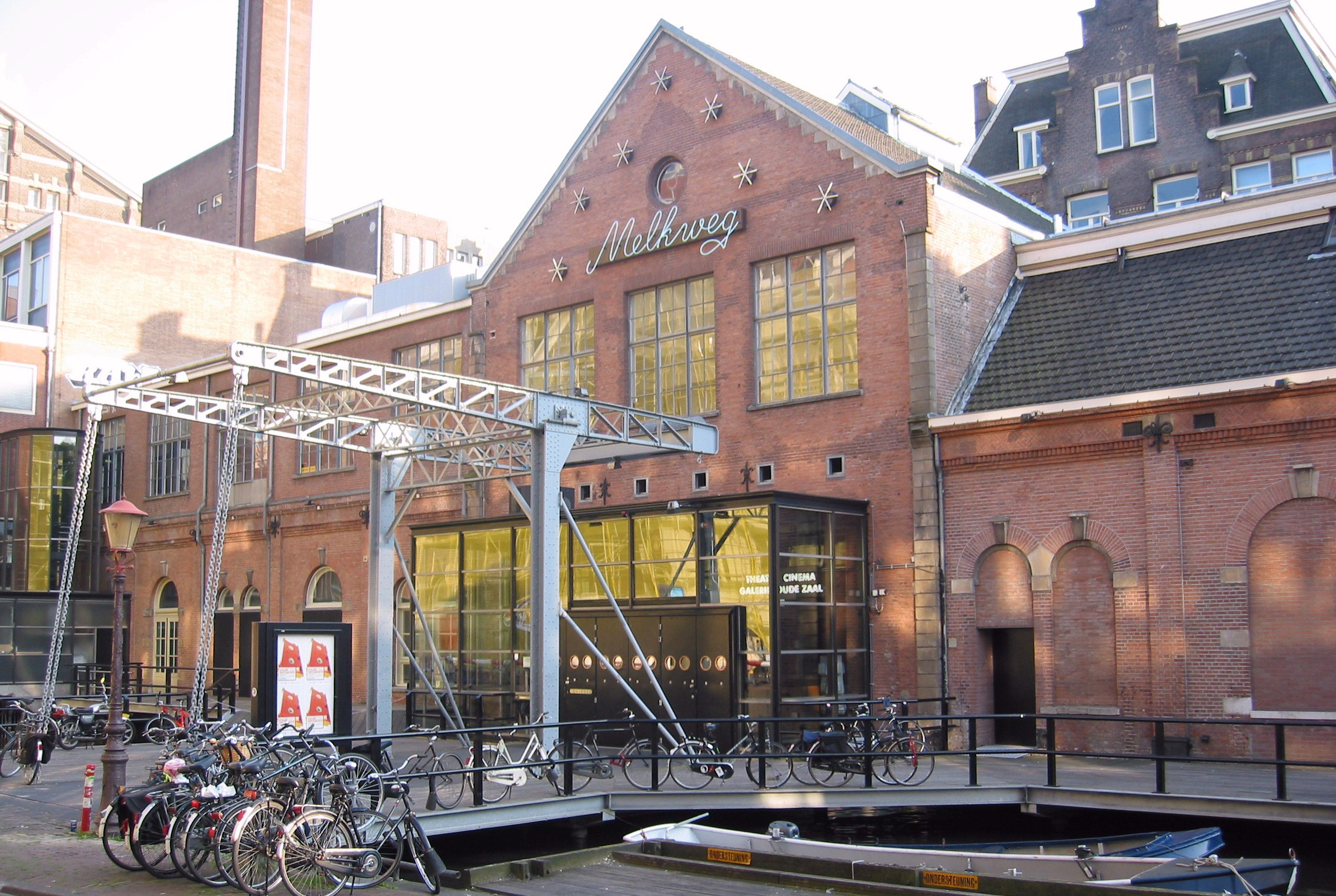
In 2014, the album was re-released with a live disc recorded in 2012 at the Melkweg in Amsterdam.

Sparks in a Dark Room was originally released on LP by Belgian label Factory Benelux in May 1982 in Europe, their only album released on the label before returning to Plurex for their subsequent album Poste Restante (1983). It was not a commercial success, and no singles were released from it. On 27 January 2003, post-punk reissue label LTM remastered and re-released the album on CD–the first time it was available on the format–with eleven bonus tracks, which include the non-album singles "Time" and "Een Kus", as well as unreleased demo tracks and an EP by instrumental splinter project Smalts.

On 24 March 2014, Factory Benelux (by then run by James Nice of LTM) remastered and re-released the album as an expansive double CD set, the first disc containing the same track listing as the LTM edition whilst the bonus disc features an entire live performance of thirteen songs recorded at the Melkweg in Amsterdam on 7 April 2012 as part of the band's 30th anniversary tour, with original members Wally Van Middendorp, Wim Dekker and Pieter Mulder augmented by guitarist Mark Ritsema. On 30 April 2014, Factory Benelux also this edition as a double LP, with the exception of the bonus material on the first disc. The LP re-issue was printed on black, blue or orange vinyl with only 500 copies pressed.

== Reception and legacy ==
Professional ratings
Review scores
Source	Rating
Allmusic	4/5 stars
Muzik	(favourable)
Peek-a-boo	(9/10)
Q	(favourable)
Uncut	(favourable)

Although mostly overlooked upon its initial release, Sparks in a Dark Room had become increasingly noted over time, and critical acclaim greeted the album upon its original 2003 reissue. Uncut said "the cold menace of the album sounds remarkably fresh 20 years on, bearing favourable comparisons with contemporaries such as Simple Minds and Tubeway Army as well as the current crop of analogue pretenders." Muzik called it a "fascinating" album and quipped "if you can keep a straight face whilst listening to Interpol, you'll love it." Q called the band "the Interpol of their day" and said the album has "aged surprisingly well". Careless Talk said that the album "places Minny Pops squarely within the realm of an early 80s interface that pitched accessible pop conveniences and electronic experimentation in the same arena." Patrick of Gullbuy stated "The Minny Pops had reached their peak by this point in their career and were able to put their all into the album" and called it "another uniquely electronic album to add to the canon of great music being offered up in the early 80s." The Quietus called the album "excellent." A reviewer for Brainwashed commented on the album's uniqueness, saying:

"If you're aware of the music happening in Belgium in the early 1980s (particularly Siglo XX, the Neon Judgement, and A Blaze Colour) then the gloomy monotone grooves of Sparks in a Dark Room will immediately sound familiar. But there's something different here; on Sparks, there exists an implacable note of self-awareness and humor which separates the album from those by other practitioners of the style. Tunes like "A Feeling" and "Night Visit" are perversely catchy, with lyrics that tend toward self-effacing. I like that. The humor, however subtle, offsets the otherwise overbearing gloom."

"For a scene dominated by po-faced dullards, Minny Pops are welcome light relief. Although too eccentric to make sense of their regular comparisons to Interpol, this lavish expansion of their second album from 1982 is a good starting point, thanks to its Cabaret Voltaire pulse and Wally van Middendorp's tongue-in-cheek dark monologues."

— Classic Pop talking about the album in 2014.

Many critics consider the album to be a lost classic within popular music; Uncut referred to the album as "an under-the-radar masterpiece". Whisperin' and Hollerin' said the album was "a real lost electropop classic from a time when minimal synth-pop crossovers were rightly lauded as being pioneering. Minny Pops established a firm identity as purveyors of fine, hypnotic Euro trance pop, and SIADR is a lost classic of a kind". Other Music stated "Pristine bleakness. Take this opportunity to hear the misery missed," whilst Gullbuy said the album "paints a vivid picture of this lost Dutch band." Peter Heselmans Peek-a-boo Magazine, who rated it nine stars out of ten, said "Sparks in a Dark Room is really a classic, and a must have for every lover of minimal synthpop. The gloomy monotone grooves of the Minny Pops will take you back to the early days of minimal pop. Some very catch tracks, like Night Visit will carry you away, even with a spark of humor. So if you want to investigate the origins of industrial dance or darkwave, select Sparks In a Dark Room for your listening pleasure. I did, and as a former lover from VPRO’s Radio Nome and Spleen broadcasts I really enjoyed this album."

The bonus material on the 2014 re-release was critically acclaimed, with critics feeling the songs made great appendages to the album. Oor stated "the Melkweg live recording from 2012 - whoa, it's really something. With the rhythm box/drum computer again on board the whole thing sounds far more radical. The band of 2012 (according to the Minny Pops concept, including two members not part of the original setting) is to the point, and Wally's declamations sound urgent. He even announces some tracks with their catalogue number - a privilege courtesy only of the Factory family tree." Classic Pop were also very favourable, commenting that the Melkweg recording was a "brutal live album from their 30th anniversary tour in 2012, which replaces drums with a drum machine while adding a guitarist whose changing style adds to the theatrical doom."

== Track listing ==
All songs written by Minny Pops.

1. "Mountain" – 3:19
2. "A Feeling" – 3:19
3. "Tracking" – 2:51
4. "Crack" – 2:26
5. "Vital" – 2:40
6. "Blue Roses" – 2:38
7. "Black Eye" – 3:23
8. "Wong" – 4:00
9. "Experience" – 3:32
10. "Dream" – 2:09
11. "Night Visit" – 3:08
12. "Trance" – 1:57

=== Bonus tracks (2003 and 2014) ===
13. "Time" – 3:44
14. "Lights" – 3:29
15. "Een Kus" – 3:56
16. "Son" – 2:53
17. "Secret Story (Demo)" – 3:12
18. "Schitterende Ogen (Demo)" – 2:44
19. "Time (Demo)" – 4:28
20. "Werktitel # 7" – 2:21
21. "Werktitel # 5" – 3:33
22. "Werktitel # 1" – 5:57
23. "Werktitel # 8" – 2:09

Tracks 20–23 performed by Smalts

=== Bonus disc (2014) ===
Amsterdam Melkweg 7/4/2012

1. "Kogel" – 4:33
2. "Blue Roses" – 3:07
3. "Tracking" – 4:15
4. "Vital" – 3:34
5. "Goddess" – 4:01
6. "Dolphin's Spurt" – 3:35
7. "Mountain" – 5:10
8. "Wong" – 6:33
9. "Secret Story" – 4:23
10. "Time – 4:32
11. "Trance" – 2:50
12. "Mental" – 7:31
13. "Son" –3:21

== Personnel ==
- Wally van Middendorp – vocals, drum machine
- Wim Dekker – keyboards
- Pieter Mulder – guitar
- Produced by Minny Pops
