= Bambix =

Dutch punk band

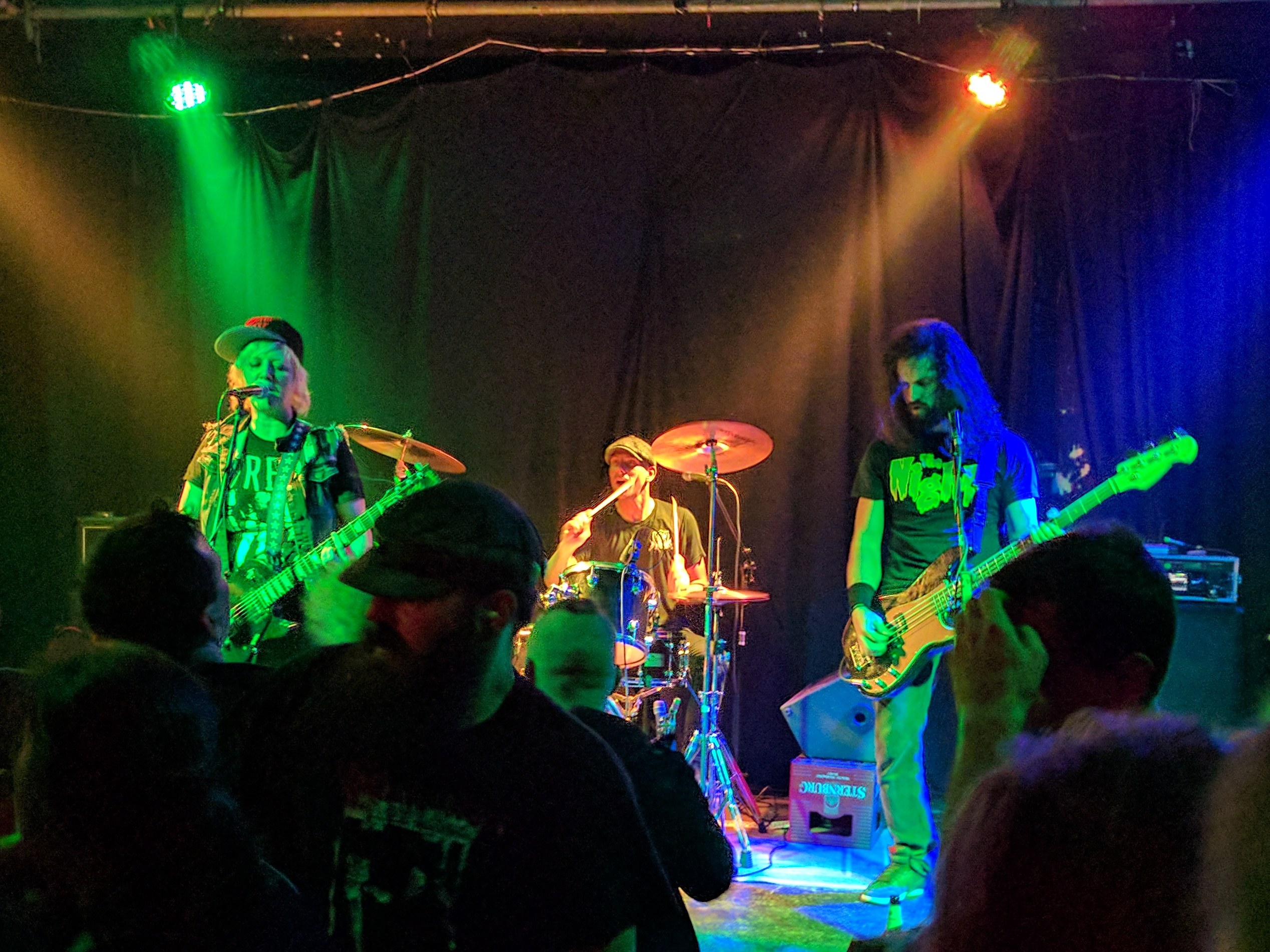
- Bambix live 2017

Background information
- Origin: Nijmegen, Netherlands
- Genres: Punk rock; queercore; riot grrrl
- Years active: 1988–present
- Labels: Vitaminepillen Records; Go-Kart Records; Rookie Records; Daemon Records
- Members: Willia "Wick Bambix" van Houdt (guitar, vocals); Burn von Pey (bass); Don Cardeneo (drums)
- Past members: Nathalie Delisse (guitar, vocals); Maniet Voets (bass, vocals), Peter Dragt (drums), Mariena Steensma (bass, vocals) Janneke Bernaert (bass, vocals), Patrick Schappert (bass), Beer (drums), Maniet (bass)

Bambix is a Dutch punk band founded in Nijmegen in 1988. Their music can also be categorized as riot grrrl or queercore. Their music is melodic punk, driven by female vocals. Bambix has been indexed as a significant musical export of the Netherlands. Bambix has cited Propaghandi, NOFX, Dixie Chicks, Leonard Cohen, Mary Black, Indigo Girls, Michelle Shocked, and early Eagles as musical influences.

== History ==
Bambix was founded in 1988 by Wick Bambix (Willia van Houdt) as an all-women band. The name "Bambix" comes from a manufacturer of baby food in the Netherlands. Wick had the idea to form a band, and put ads in various newspapers to find other band members. Wick has said that, being a woman in punk, she has had lit cigarettes thrown at her hair on stage, as well as overt threats of rape. Over the years, as band members left and were replaced, Bambix has evolved from an all-women band to a woman-fronted band. Wick is the primary songwriter.

Bambix has shared the stage with Bad Religion, Terrorgruppe, Fabulous Disaster, GBH, Good Riddance, The Ataris, Sepultura, Pennywise, Snuff, Snapcase, Instigators, Toy Dolls, Pascow, and Cock Sparrer, among others. Recently Wick Bambix has put out a solo album The Pariah's Promise (Rookie Records, 2023) and also performed solo shows. The single from this album is the song Solitary.

== Discography ==
Bambix has released seven studio albums, three of which were on the German indie punk label Vitaminepillen Records. Two studio albums were released by the European-wide label Go-Kart Records. Bambix has also released 4 EPs.

=== Studio albums ===
1. Out of the Cradle Endlessly Rocking (Gap Recordings, 1992)
2. Crossing Common Borders (Vitaminepillen Records, 1995)
3. Leitmotiv (Vitaminepillen Records, 1998)
4. What's in a Name (Vitaminepillen Records (Germany)/Daemon Records (USA), 2000)
5. Club Matuchek (Go-Kart Records Europe, 2004)
6. Bleeding in a Box (Go-Kart Records Europe, 2008)
7. The Storytailor (Rookie Records, 2012)

=== Singles and EPs ===
- They Even Took The Memory 7" EP (Intelnet Records, 1989)
- Rough & Mean, split with Beaucoup De Cadavres (Gonzo Circus, 1992)
- To Call a Spade a Spade EP (Vitaminepillen Records, 1996)
- Klasse, split EP with Skin of Tears (Vitaminepillen, 1999)
- Annie single (Nix Gut Records, 2000)
- Ritalin EP (Vitaminepillen, 2002)
- 3:15am, split-EP with Johnnie Rook (Major Label, 2011)
