= Stephen Emmer =

Dutch musician

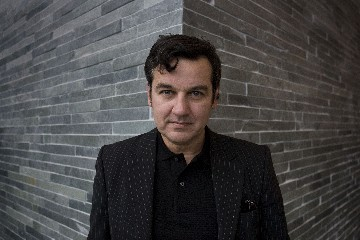

Background information
- Born: 28 January 1958 (age 68); Amsterdam, Netherlands
- Genres: Experimental pop; soul neoclassical; film score; spoken word
- Instruments: Guitar, piano, keyboard, bass
- Years active: 1972–present
- Labels: WEA/Idiot, Allegro, Supertracks, Electric Fairytale
- Website: stephenemmer.com

Stephen Emmer (/ˈstɛfən/ STEF-ən; born 28 January 1958 in Amsterdam) is a Dutch composer, arranger, producer, sound designer and musician. Best known as a composer for Dutch television and film, Emmer has released four albums as a solo artist, each with a different theme or concept. Vogue Estate released in 1982, is the soundtrack for an imaginary film; 2007's Recitement is a spoken word album of poetry and prose; International Blue, released in 2014, is a tribute to pop crooners. In 2017 Emmer released Home Ground, a neo-soul album that addresses social issues related to origin.

Emmer is closely associated with the Dutch Ultra movement of late 1970s and early 1980s. He was a member of Minny Pops and the Lotus Eaters, co-founded the music magazine Vinyl and hosted and produced RadioNome for Dutch broadcasting organization VPRO.

== Early life and education ==
Emmer was born in Amsterdam. His parents are mother Roekie Aronds, actress and ballet dancer and father Fred Emmer, an anchorman for NOS Journaal. In the late 70s he played in a free jazz group and a symphonic rock group with Mathilde Santing and Dennis Duchart.

== Music ==
=== 1979-1984: Minny Pops, Radionome, Vinyl, Vogue Estate ===
In 1979, Emmer joined Minny Pops, an avant-garde post-punk band central to the Dutch Ultra movement, and co-founded Vinyl, a music magazine launched in 1981. In January 1980, Minny Pops opened for Joy Division and were subsequently signed by Factory Records. In 1981, they recorded their first single for Factory, Dolphin's Spurt, with Joy Division producer Martin Hannett. The first Dutch band to do a Peel Session, Minny Pops toured the UK several times; Emmer, who had joined the band as a guitarist, performed and recorded on both guitar and bass guitar on the album "Drastic Measures, Drastic Movement". He also hosted and produced radio programs for the Dutch broadcasting organization VPRO, including Radionome, which aired experimental music and live in-studio performances. Emmer's music was included on Radionome compilation albums issued by VPRO. In 1982, Emmer recorded Vogue Estate, a soundtrack for an imaginary film. Although mainly an instrumental, it included two songs with vocals: "Wish On" with Billy MacKenzie (of The Associates) and "Never Share" with Martha Ladley (from Martha and the Muffins). Michael Dempsey, formerly of The Cure, played bass on Vogue Estate, which was produced by Emmer with Flood. Emmer also performed with the Associates in 1982. In 1984 Dempsey and Emmer joined The Lotus Eaters.

=== 2006 – present: Recitement, International Blue, Home Ground ===
Working with producer Tony Visconti, Emmer composed music to accompany poetry and prose voiced by authors and performers for the album Recitement, released on the Dutch Supertracks label in 2007. Some were new recordings, made specifically for Recitement, and others were previously recorded. Its 17 tracks included texts by Yoko Ono, Allen Ginsberg, Paul Theroux, Thomas Hardy, Jorge Luis Borges, Ken Nordine, Charles Baudelaire and Samuel Beckett, voiced by Lou Reed, Richard Burton, Sylvia Kristel, Michael Parkinson and Hugo Claus among others. In 2014, again working with Visconti, Emmer released International Blue, tribute to pop crooning. A collection of "lushly orchestrated tales of heartbreak", it featured vocalists Midge Ure from Ultravox, Glenn Gregory of Heaven 17, Liam McKahey of Cousteau and Neil Crossley. Gregory collaborated on four of the album's ten songs, including "Untouchable", a "darkly sumptuous" tribute to Billy MacKenzie. For the Christmas holiday, Julian Lennon recorded a seasonal version of the album's "Sleep for England". De Telegraaf wrote that International Blue was "the most beautifully orchestrated, arranged and composed album of the year".

In 2017, Emmer released Home Ground, a retro-soul album inspired by the "music-with-a-message movement of the 1970s", such as Marvin Gaye's What's Going On. The album addresses social issues related to "homeground". Commenting on Homeground in a 2017 interview Emmer said: "Where your own home ground is; is it in your own country, your city or village, your house or is it close to your loved ones or is it in your own heart or head?" A benefit album for the charity War Child featured vocalists including Chaka Khan, Leon Ware, Patti Austin, Frank McComb and Andy Bey. Review Soultracks. Emmer is the founder of eStation, a media production studio. He is the music director for Holiday on Ice, and the Cartoon Network's live show, which launched in 2018.

The album Maison Melody, self-recorded by Emmer during the COVID-19 lockdown, was released for free in 2020 to emotionally support the people financially affected by self-isolations. His 2026 album Asymmetrical Dot was criticised by PopMatters for being "too long", although they praised the philosophy of the work, comparing it to George Harrison.

== Awards ==
- Home Ground, Golden Global Music Award 2017
- Humanitarian Award, Global Music Awards, 2018

== Discography ==
=== Albums ===
Year	Album	Label	Notes
2020	Maison Melody	Electric Fairytale Recordings	
2017	Home Ground	Electric Fairytale Recordings	With Chaka Khan, Patti Austin, Leon Ware; Kendra Foster, Frank McComb, Mary Griffin; Ursula Rucker, Andy Bey and Dwight Trible
2014	International Blue	Electric Fairytale Recordings	with Midge Ure, Neil Crossley; Liam McKahey, and Glenn Gregory
2008	Recitement	Supertracks	with Lou Reed, Ken Nordine; Yoko Ono, Jorge Luis Borges and others
1982	Vogue Estate	WEA/Idiot Records	

=== Singles ===
Year	Song	Label
2017	"Home Ground" ft Patti Austin	Electric Fairytale Recordings
2017	"Close To Life" ft Frank McComb and Leon Ware	Electric Fairytale Recordings
2017	"A New Day To Come" ft Andy Bey	Electric Fairytale Recordings
2017	"Soil" ft Ursula Rucker	Electric Fairytale Recordings
2014	"Sleep For England" ft Julian Lennon	Electric Fairytale Recordings
2014	"Let The Silence Hold You" ft Glenn Gregory	Electric Fairytale Recordings
2014	"Untouchable" ft Glenn Gregory	Electric Fairytale Recordings
2007	"Passengers" ft Lou Reed	Supertracks
1985	"End of the Affair" with Continental Cast	Epic / Sony
1984	"Endless" with Lotus Eaters	Sylvan Records
1982	"Pedalenproza" ft Richard Zijlstra	Vinyl/Sonopresse
1982	Never Share ft Martha Ladley	WEA/Idiot Records
1981	"Dolphin's Spurt" with Minny Pops	Factory
