= Red Rat (comic) =

Dutch punk comic

- Author: Johannes van de Weert
- Current status/schedule: Ceased
- Launch date: 1980
- End date: 1983
- Publisher: Raket
- Genres: Action; Adventure; Anthropomorphic; Communism
- Original language: Dutch

Red Rat was a Dutch text comic drawn by the artist Johannes van de Weert, which was published in the far-left punk magazine Raket in the early 1980s.

== Background ==
Van de Weert began the Red Rat comic as a response to his experience of the police violence against protestors during the riots that occurred on the occasion of the coronation of Queen Beatrix in April 1980. The comic was published in Raket, a wall newspaper that developed into a popular magazine of the Dutch left. Having abandoned his initial membership of a local Marxist-Leninist group, viewing them as humourless, van de Weert became inspired by the more militant tactics of the Red Army Faction. The storylines and themes contained in Red Rat reflected the politics its author developed. The comic's art was also influenced by the Dadaist movement and the DIY ethics of punk.

== Contents ==
Red Rat focused on the adventures of the eponymously named lead character, an everyday rat caught up in the politics and social strife of the time. Van de Weert depicted the comic's protagonists as rats who opposed the ruling class of pigs, in satirical reference to the Amsterdam police commissioner of the time who had described those on the left as rats invading Dutch society. The comic chronicled the adventures of Red Rat as he confronted the police, and the far-right, or as he came into disagreement with fellow punks, squatters and adherents of various left-wing tendencies.

== Publication history ==
Red Rat was originally published as an edition of Raket, numbering 250 copies before eventually increasing to editions of 1000. In collaboration with another publisher, Red Rat was also produced as an offset comic. The Red Rat character was sometimes painted or drawn as graffiti directly onto walls around Rotterdam.

The popularity of van de Weert's comic led to its translation into German. In 2009 he produced a Red Rat retrospective comic. In 2016 a three volume edition Red Rat was released in French, with a later edition titled Les Aventures de Red Rat in 2021.
