= The Nixe =

Dutch punk band

the Nixe
- Origin: Utrecht, Netherlands
- Genres: Punk rock
- Years active: 1979 - 1984
- Labels: Rock against records
- Members: Ilva Poortvliet (singer), Nikki Meijerink (bass), Marian De Beurs (guitar), Simone Luken (drums)

The Nixe was a Dutch punk band from the city of Utrecht in the Netherlands. The Nixe was possibly the first all-female punk band in the Netherlands. Their lyrics emphasized women's experiences, and were written from a feminist perspective. Although the Nixe played at many women's festivals, they preferred not to be thought of as a politically motivated punk band. They liked to play in front of audiences that were not only women. They defended the movement to squat in unused buildings and performed in squats on the Plompetorengracht, the Biltstraat, and the Lange Nieuwstraat. The band won worldwide attention through contributions to compilation albums such as the American Killed by Death series and the album "I'm Sure We're Gonna Make It" released on Epitaph Records. A photo of members of the Nixe is one of the most iconic photos of the early Dutch punk scene. For example, this photo was used to advertise the Centraal Museum of Utrecht's 2012 exhibition entitled "God Save the Queen" about Dutch punk from 1977 to 1984.

== History ==
The inspiration for forming the band came when Ilva Poortvliet and Nikki Meijerink saw a concert by the Utrecht punk band The Duds (earlier known as Blitzkrieg, the first punk band in Utrecht) at the Kasbah in Maarssen in January 1979. The band's name is the Germanic word for a mermaid or water spirit (see also Nixie). The Nixe's first live performance was on June 14, 1979, at the café De Baas in the Biltstraat in Utrecht, where they played with the Lullabies, another punk band from Utrecht. The Nixe then regularly performed at the Spinnehok in Utrecht. In November 1980, the Nixe played at the rock festival "Rock tegen de rollen" (English translation "Rock against [gender] roles") which took place in Utrecht.

In 2008, the Nixe gave a reunion concert at the Ekko, a popular concert venue in the city of Utrecht. Their recordings were re-released on Polly Maggoo Records the same year.

== Discography ==
=== Albums ===
- The Nixe E.P. - 7" Rock Against Records, 1981
- The Nixe Complete 1980-1981 Recordings by the first Dutch All-Girl Punkband, Polly Maggoo Records 2008

=== Samplers ===
- Utreg Punx E.P. - (7", ep) - Rock Against Records 1980
- "Parkhof 11-4-81" on label "V.G. 012" - LP 1981
- "I'm Sure We're Gonna Make It" on Epitaph Records 1996
- "I Don't Care (Dutch Punk 1977-1983)" Pseudonym 2016
- "I Don't Care Volume 2 (Dutch Punk 1977-1983)" Pseudonym 2016
