= De Hardheid =

Dutch skapunk band

- Origin: Amsterdam, Netherlands
- Genres: Ska, Dutch Punk
- Years active: 1996–present
- Label: Eargear Records
- Members: Singer and Guitarist: Mr. Cokart; Singer: Harm Van Putten; Bassist: Daan; Guitarist: Drs. Rik; Drummer: Niels; Tenor saxophonist: Henny; Trumpeter: Jens; Altsaxophonist: Menno Vermeulen; Trombonist: Giel "Mendel" Mulder

De Hardheid is a Dutch skapunk band from Amsterdam composed of nine members. The band was founded in 1996 and sings in Dutch. De Hardheid has released three studio albums and one EP.

Although the band has been on sabbatical since 2009, they occasionally play reunion gigs. De Hardheid has often played at poppodia and other Dutch festivals, including performances in 2023.

The band was influenced by bands like The Specials, Doe Maar, The Skatalites and the Dead Kennedys.

== Discography ==
=== Studio albums ===
1. Wreed voor je (1999)
2. Lijfstraf (2001) — Corporal Punishment
3. De Nodige Hardheid (2003) — The Necessary Hardness
4. Onze Jongens (2006) Our Boys

=== Singles and EPs ===
1. Laat Je Tanden Zien (EP) (2008)
