= Antillectual =

Dutch melodic hardcore/punk rock band

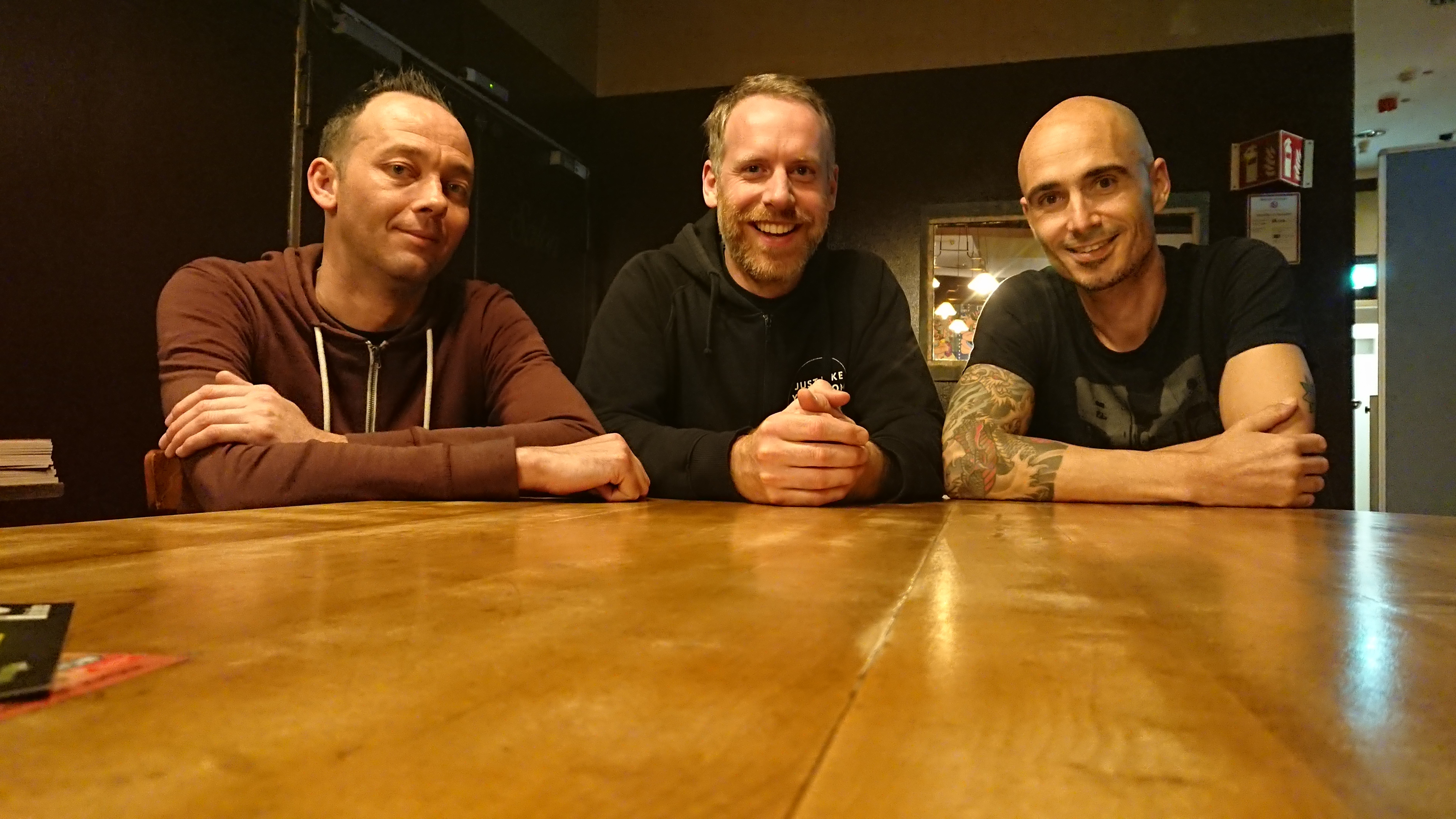
- Antillectual in 2021

Background information
- Origin: Netherlands
- Genres: Melodic hardcore Punk rock
- Years active: 2000-present
- Labels: Redfield Records; Bird Attack Records; FUSA Records; Waterslide Records
- Members: Willem; Ben; Riekus
- Past members: Bob; Pieter; Falco; Yvo; Pitter; Tom; Tim Vantol; Glen; Toon
- Website: antillectual.com

Antillectual is a Dutch Punk or melodic hardcore band from the city of Nijmegen, founded in 2000. Their lyrics are politically motivated and typically written in English. The band has toured extensively in the US, England, Germany, France, Spain, Portugal, Italy, Slovenia, Austria, Switzerland, Norway, Sweden, Belgium, and Luxembourg. They have shared the stage with Rise Against, Strike Anywhere, A Wilhelm Scream, Against Me!, Anti-Flag, Ignite, Story of the Year, Strung Out, No Use For A Name, Bad Religion, Propagandhi, and NOFX.

== History ==
Antillectual started out as four-piece punk rock band in 2000. In 2001, bass player Pieter left the band and was replaced by Falco. With this line-up, they recorded their first demo. When Falco left the band 2003, the band decided not to replace him by a new member; Yvo dropped the guitar and became the new bass player. As a three-piece punk rock band, they released their first full-length album Silencing Civilization on Angry Youth Records in 2005.

In 2006, Bob left the band and was replaced by Riekus. Along with their second tour in the United States, they released the Waves 7", with songs from Silencing Civilization on Side A and a preview of their second album on Side B.

Their second full-length album Testimony was released in 2008 by seven independent record labels throughout Europe, The USA, Japan and Malaysia. Antillectual celebrated this release by touring relentlessly and playing No Idea Records Fest 7 in Gainesville, Florida.

In January 2010, bassist Yvo left the band to focus on his family, and was replaced by former Smash The Statues frontman Tom. Tom was later replaced by Tim Vantol, who was in turn replaced by Glen. In 2014 the band consists of members Willem, Riekus and Toon. Their 2016 album "Engage!", is released on Redfield Records (Europe), Bird Attack Records (North America), FUSA Records (Latin America) and Waterslide Records (Japan). In 2020 Toon left the band, to be replaced by Ben in 2021. Antillectual's 2023's release Together on Fond Of Life Records is the band's first full-length release in 7 years.

== Members ==
- Willem - guitar and vocals (2000–present)
- Yvo - guitar and vocals (2000–2003), bass and vocals (2003–2009)
- Pieter - bass (2000–2001)
- Falco - bass (2000–2003)
- Bob - drums (2000–2006)
- Riekus - drums and vocals (2006–present)
- Pitter - bass and vocals (June 2008 - dec. 2008)
- Tom - bass and vocals (September 2009 - February 2011)
- Tim Vantol - bass and vocals (February 2011 – August 2011)
- Glen - bass and vocals (October 2011 - 2013)
- Toon - bass and vocals (2014–2020)
- Ben - bass and vocals (2021–present)

== Accomplishments ==
- Tours: North, Middle & South America, all of Europe, Turkey, Russia and Japan
- Festivals: The Fest 7 & 11 (FL, USA), Monster Bash (GER), Punk Rock Holiday (SLO), Give It A Name (Ita), Fluff Fest (CZ), Riez Open Air (GER), Eurosonic Noorderslag 2011 (NL), Incubate (NL), Jera On Air (NL), Breakfest (NL)
- Supports: Propagandhi (tour), Boysetsfire (tour), Satanic Surfers (tour), Ten Foot Pole (tour), NOFX, Bad Religion, Rise Against, The Gaslight Anthem, Against Me!, Hot Water Music, Anti-Flag
- Releases in Europe, USA, Russia, Japan and Brazil.
- Cooperation: Guest vocals by Chris Hannah from Propagandhi, Nathan Gray from BoySetsFire, Thomas Barnett from Strike Anywhere and a split 7” with Anti-Flag
- Notable: Dutch Pop Institutes NPI, MusicXport and the Dutch Society for Performing Arts (NFPK) support Antillectual's touring efforts. BUMA Cultuur classifies Antillectual "top musical export" since 2008 with fellow Dutch artists like No Turning Back, Peter Pan Speedrock, Andre Rieu and DJ Tiësto.

== Discography ==
- Facts, Opinions And In Between (D.I.Y., 2003)
- Silencing Civilization (Angry Youth Records, 2005)
- Waves 7" (Square Of Opposition Records, Glory Days of Youth Records, 2007)
- Testimony (Shield Recordings, No Reason Records, Rise Or Rust Records, Infected Records, Fond Of Life Records, Youth Way Records, Jump Start Records, fastlife records, embrace records 2008)
- Pull The Plug (Shield Recordings, No Reason Records, SUMS Records 2009 - acoustic EP)
- Start From Scratch! (Angry Chuck Records, No Reason Records, Destiny Records, Effervescence Records, Discos Rayados Records, Lockjaw Records, Shield Recordings, Square of Opposition Records, 5 feet under Records, Sit Still Promotion, Infected Records 2010)
- Future History (Shield Recordings, Destiny Records, No Reason Records, Lockjaw Records, Angry Chuck Records 2012 - EP)
- Perspectives & Objectives (A-F Records, Suburban Records, Destiny Records, Effervescence Records, Destroy It Yourself Records, Angry Chuck Records, 5FeetUnder Records, No Reason Records, Lockjaw Records 2013 - LP / CD)
- Engage! (Redfield Records, Waterslide Records, Fusa Records 2016 - LP / CD / tape)
- Covers EP (2020 - EP)
- Together (2023 - LP / CD / tape)
