= Tedje en de Flikkers =

Early Dutch punk band

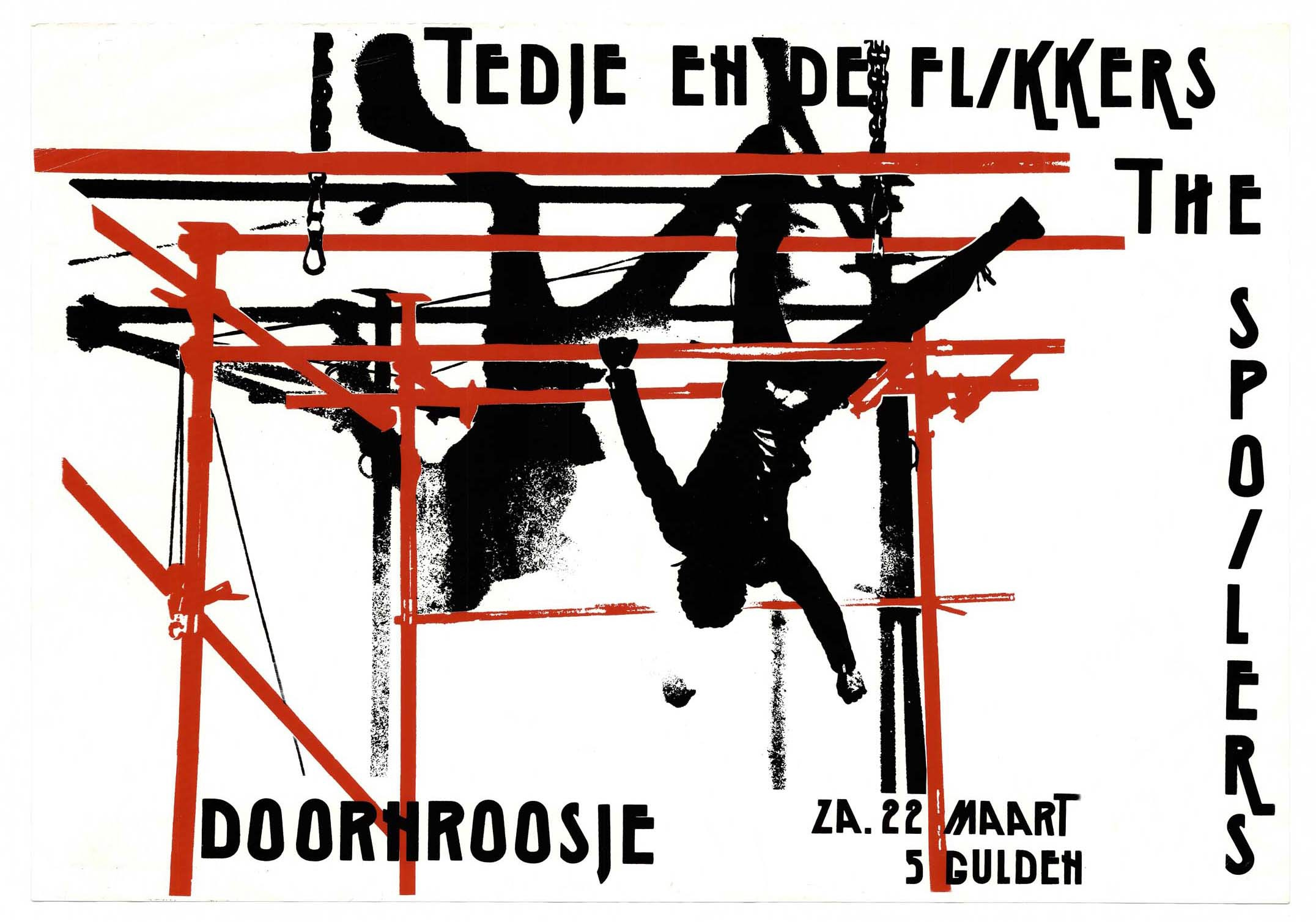
- Poster advertising Tedje en de Flikkers' show with The Spoilers in the Doornroosje on March 22, 1980

Background information
- Origin: Nijmegen, Netherlands
- Genres: punk, queercore
- Years active: 1977-1980
- Members: Marty van Kerkhof (bass, singer), Thijs Maasen (drums), Tedje van Asseldonk (keyboard/synthesizer), Andréas Cuppen (guitar, lead singer)

Tedje en de Flikkers (English translation: Tedje and the Faggots) was one of the earliest Dutch punk bands, founded in Nijmegen in 1977. Their music is typically classified as punk pathetique ('pret-punk', or 'fun-punk'). The band consisted of Tedje van Asseldonk (a woman) and three gay men: Marty van Kerkhof, Thijs Maasen, and Andréas Cuppen (André). The idea to form a punk band came from Tedje, who had punk friends.

Like many punk bands, Tedje en de Flikkers were associated with leftist political movements. They were actively involved with the Rooie Flikkers (Red Faggots), a gay liberation group that thrived in Nijmegen from 1975 to 1980, and that emphasized actions through theater and music.

The goal of performances by Tedje en de Flikkers was to shock the audience with their explosive and exhibitionistic performances. Band members wore elaborate face-paint and leather suits, and used dildos and sado-masochistic equipment as props. Their song lyrics were explicit about gay men's sex, and included insults aimed at politicians. Dutch pop magazines called them "the craziest punk band in the Netherlands”. Some town mayors banned their performances.

Their best known songs are "Van Agt" and "Ik ben een hoer". The lyrics of "Ik ben een hoer" (English translation: "I am a whore") address sexual liberation, a common theme of queercore music; this will remind audiences, for example, of the song "I'm gonna be a slut" from American queercore band Pansy Division. "Van Agt" references the politician Dries van Agt, also the subject of the first Dutch punk single "Van Agt Casanova," released by Paul Tornado in 1977. Tedje en de Flikkers' song "Op de Baan" addresses the topic of gay cruising in a park. Tedje en de Flikkers played in concert venues including the Paradiso, de Melkweg, de Effenaar, at the club 013, Doornroosje, and the Cafe Royal in Zoutelande. They were interviewed by Radio Stad in Amsterdam.

== Discography ==
- self-titled LP Tedje & de Flikkers - Spina Bifida en Starlet, 1979
- contributions to the compilation album Uitholling Overdwars - Stichting Popmuziek Nederland, 1979
- contributions to the compilation album I Don't Care Collection (Dutch Punk 1977-1983) - Pseudonym, 2016

== Videos ==
- VPRO-programma "R.A.M - TEDJE EN DE FLIKKERS" (2003).
- "Gluren in het donker" a documentary about the Rooie Flikkerbeweging made by Els Dinnissen (2005).
