= Minny Pops =

Dutch new wave/electronic/art punk band

- Origin: Netherlands
- Genres: Post-punk, electronic, new wave, art punk, experimental
- Years active: 1978–1985, 2012 and 2014-present
- Labels: Factory; Factory Benelux; LTM; Plurex; Blowpipe
- Members: Wally van Middendorp; Pieter Mulder
- Past members: Wally van Middendorp (vocals, drum machine); Frans Hagenaars (bass guitar); Peter Mertens (guitar); Stephen Emmer (guitar); Dennis Duchhart (guitar); Willem (Wim) Dekker (keyboards); Leon van Zoeren (bass); Gerard Walhof (guitar); Pieter Mulder (bass guitar); Mark Ritsema (guitar); Orpheus Roovers (drums); Pim Scheelings (guitar); Thomas Myrmel (keyboards)
- Website: http://www.minnypops.com

Minny Pops is a Dutch, Amsterdam-based new wave/electronic/art punk band, associated with the Ultra post-punk movement in the Netherlands and the Factory Records label in the UK.

== History ==
The vocalist/songwriter/programmer Wally van Middendorp formed the band in 1978, taking the name from a primitive Korg drum machine, the Mini Pops.

Minny Pops, which van Middendorp originally intended to be a project for just three performances, had an initial lineup of van Middendorp, bass guitarist Frans Hagenaars, guitarist Peter Mertens, and two dancers, including van Middendorp's older brother, Rob.

The band's first commercially released recording was the "Kojak" single (b/w "Footsteps" and "Nervous") (Plurex 005), issued in 1979 on Plurex, the independent label founded by van Middendorp in 1978.

Minny Pops' first full-length album, Drastic Measures, Drastic Movement (Plurex 900) was released in 1979.

After opening for Joy Division in Eindhoven and Den Haag in January 1980, the band was brought to the attention of Factory Records by Rob Gretton, Joy Division's manager.

Minny Pops' first single for Factory, "Dolphin's Spurt"/"Goddess" (FAC 31) was produced by Martin Hannett and recorded at Strawberry Studios in Stockport. It reached number 23 in the UK Independent Chart. Further releases for the label included the single "Secret Story"/"Island" (FAC 57), the flexi single "Een Kus" (FACBN 13 - later reissued as 7" vinyl on LTM Recordings with "Son" on the B-side), the single "Time"/"Lights" (FBN 11) and the full-length album (FACBN 15), which was released by Factory Benelux in 1982. Sparks in a Dark Room The band's first live appearance in England was at the Beach Club, a Manchester venue associated with Factory. They went on to share further bills with Joy Division and, after Ian Curtis' death, New Order, as well as appearing with A Certain Ratio, Scritti Politti, the Au Pairs and Comsat Angels. In 1980, Minny Pops undertook a seven-date North American tour during which they played with Suicide in New York.

Curiously, the original line-up of Minny Pops never performed live in Brussels, despite their close association with the Factory Benelux label, based in that city.

In 1980, they recorded a Peel session for BBC Radio One. A line-up of van Middendorp, Dekker, van Zoeren and Walhof recorded "Dolphin's Spurt", "Mono", "Jets" and "Ice Cube Wall"; the session was broadcast on 12 November 1980. Minny Pops' final live performances were in December 1981. Under the alias "White Birds", Minny Pops contributed the song "Possessed By The Stars" to the holiday compilation album Chantons Noël - Ghosts Of Christmas Past, which was released in 1981 by Les Disques Du Crépuscule.

Minny Pops composed music for the play "Poste Restante", which was performed by the theatre collective Exota and premiered in Haarlem, The Netherlands in December 1982. This music was released in 1983 as Minny Pops' third album, Poste Restante. A fourth Minny Pops album titled 4th Floor followed in 1985. Van Middendorp and Dekker recorded two dance singles for Factory under the name Streetlife. Between 2003 and 2004, the bulk of the Minny Pops studio back catalogue was issued on remastered CD by LTM.In November 2011, van Middendorp told an interviewer with the Dutch national public broadcaster VPRO's 3Voor12 programme that Minny Pops would perform their first gigs in 30 years in early 2012, and that a live CD/DVD package, Standstill to Motion, would appear via LTM in January 2012.

In 2012, the band (original members van Middendorp, Dekker and Mulder, with guitarist Mark Ritsema) performed to some acclaim in Sheffield, Leeds, Manchester and London. This lineup, augmented by programmer/keyboard player Thomas Myrmel, also recorded a double A-sided 7" single, "Waiting for This To Happen" / "Glistering", for Tim Burgess' label O-Genesis, which was released in November 2012.

During the course of 2012, Minny Pops also performed in Brussels and participated in live multimedia events in the Netherlands organised by the revived Ultra group. A recording of a complete live performance at the Melkweg in Amsterdam on 7 April 2012 was included as a bonus disc with the 2014 reissue of Sparks in a Dark Room via Factory Benelux. As of 2014, they are back performing and have played in the UK.

Minny Pops' website states: "Based out of the UK since 2014, Minny Pops are now operating as a collective with a cast of collaborators from various places that man might visit from time to time: Austin, Bristol, London, Rotterdam, and Los Angeles." Several new songs and remixes were released in 2019 and 2020 on the Blowpipe label. An album titled Stockholm 1974 followed in 2021. The album title refers to Stockholm Syndrome and the 1974 kidnapping of Patty Hearst. The album includes contributions from Graham Dowdall (aka Gagarin), Natalia Zamilska, Louise Woodcock, Iona Tanguay and Terry Edwards. Minny Pops members Wally Van Middendorp and Pieter Mulder worked with guitarists Mark Ritsema and Lee McFadden, bassist Thomas David Ford, and drummer John Barrett. According to Minny Pops' website, the group plans "a series of four albums to be released in 2024, 2025, 2026 and 2027."

== Discography ==
Studio albums

- Drastic Measures, Drastic Movement (1979), Plurex; (re-released 2004, LTMCD 2384, LTM)
- Sparks in a Dark Room (1982), Factory Benelux; (re-released 2003, LTMCD 2351, LTM and 2014, FBN 15 CD, Factory Benelux)
- Poste Restante (1983), Plurex; (re-released 2012, Blowpipe BP047)
- 4th Floor (1985), Plurex; (re-released 2012, Blowpipe BP048)
- Stockholm 1974 (2021), Psychofon; (re-released 2024, Blowpipe BP194)

Singles

- Dolphin's Spurt (1981) UK Indie #23

Compilation album

- Secret Stories (2003), LTMCD 2353, LTM

Live album

- Standstill to Motion (2012), LTMCD 2566, LTM - CD/DVD package of live album from Melkweg show on 19 March 1981 (DVD features original source footage from various shows in USA and Europe).
