= Ultra (music) =

Dutch post-punk movement

- Stylistic origins: Post-punk, art punk, Dutch punk, alternative rock, experimental rock, new wave
- Cultural origins: 1980s in the Netherlands
- Typical instruments: experimental, self-constructed, unusual instruments, or random objects

Regional scenes
- 80s in Amsterdam (cult-status)

Ultra is a Dutch post-punk movement that originated in Amsterdam in the early 1980s. The name "ultra" is a shortening of "ultramodernen". The movement had an avantgarde, experimental, and artistic aesthetic. Many of its participants were students in art schools. In contrast to other countries' post-punk movements, the Dutch experimented with, among other things, toy instruments, chainsaws and de-tuned guitars.

There were four main strands involved with ultra music:

1. Dutch Punk bands from Amsterdam that embraced experimental music: most notably The Ex and Morzelpronk, led by Dolf Planteijdt, who ran a recording studio called the Koeienverhuurbedrijf (Cow Rental Company).
2. Amsterdam art students: most notably the Minny Pops led by Wally van Middendorp of the record label Plurex). Plurex also supported Smalts and Stephen Emmer's solo work. Other Amsterdam ultra bands included The Young Lions (1979 - 1981), Tox Modell (1980– 1982), The Tapes, and Mecano.
3. Nijmegen: Mekanik Kommando, Bazooka, Vice, and Puber Kristus/Das Wesen. Mekanik Kommando had two bass players, and played electronic music with dreamy style.
4. Eindhoven: Nasmak and friendly bands, who were interested in repetitive structures, but also produced music that was more fluid and danceable than the Amsterdam ultra bands.

Ultra was associated with the modern music magazine Vinyl, which existed from February 1981 to February 1988, and coined the term "Ultra". Stephen Emmer (the guitarist of the Minny Pops) and Arjen Schrama (the guitarist of the band Tox Modell) were the founders of this magazine. André Bach and Mark Tegefoss (also of Tox Modell) were involved and Harold Schellinx (of the band The Young Lions) served as an editor. The magazine's ambition was to create a new journalism that reflected the new music. Vinyl not only acted as a voice for the movement, but also released the music of ultra bands on flexidisc, with every issue of the magazine accompanied by a free record. The most representative compilation of the ultra movement was the C-90 cassette Ultra, released in 1981 on the Amsterdam label Lebel PERIOD, a Dutch record label associated with Tox Modell, and run by Marc Tegefoss and Det Wiehl. Most of the tracks on this album are untitled.

The band The Young Lions played a central role in defining the ultra movement and distinguished it as an abstract and conceptual musical direction. The Young Lions was active from mid-1979 to early 1981. The band consisted of the art students Rob Scholte (on drums), Ronald Heiloo (electric piano), Tim Benjamin (guitar), and Harold Schellinx (wonder instrument). The group began practicing in the basement of the Rietveld art school. The eleven songs on their cassette Small World were composed in sequence during one uninterrupted, almost 24-hour studio session; these songs were performed live only once. Scholte described the band's objective as "to show punk where it had messed up". The goal was not to produce punk music, but to take a different, more artistic approach to punk. Their rare performances often inspired violence and aggression from the audience, who did not understand their objectives. Scholte has discussed how the audience would throw beer, climb onstage, and try to break their equipment.

The most successful and internationally recognized ultra band was the Minny Pops, founded in 1978 by Wally van Middendorp (who also founded the record label Plurex). The band consisted of van Middendorp, Frans Hagenaars (bass), Peter Mertens (guitar). The Minny Pops toured internationally and opened for Joy Division.

Weekly ultra nights were organized at the Oktopus club in Amsterdam between September 1980 and March 1981. Organizers were Wally van Middendorp, Rob Scholte, and Harold Schellinx.

== Bands ==
- Bazooka
- Stephen Emmer
- The Ex
- Fahrenheit 451
- Flibbert Gibbert
- Fritura All Stars
- The Gap
- Gdansk
- Interior
- Meat
- Mecano
- Mekanik Kommando
- Mick Ness
- Minioon
- Minny Pops
- Morzelpronk
- Nasmak
- Necronomicon
- Nexda
- Plus Instruments
- Puber Kristus
- Smalts
- Soviet Sex
- Steno
- Suspect
- The Tapes
- The Tits
- Tecnoville
- Tox Modell
- Vice
- Vincent 2
- Vitaal
- The Young Lions
- z'ev

== Discography ==
=== Mekanik Kommando ===
- It Would Be Quiet in the Woods If Only a Few Birds Sing (Torso, 1981)
- Dancing Elephants (EP, Torso, 1982)
- Snake Is Queen (Wereld Rekord, EMI, 1982)
- Bay the Moon (Wereld Rekord, 1984)
- Do (Rosebud Records, 1984)
- ...And the Wind Died Down (Rosebud Records, 1986)
- Shadow of a Rose (Rosebud Records, 1986)
- The Castle of Fair Welcome (Rosebud Records, 1988)

=== Minny Pops ===
- Drastic Measures, Drastic Movement (1979), Plurex; (re-released 2004, LTMCD 2384, LTM)
- Sparks in a Dark Room (1982), Factory Benelux; (re-released 2003, LTMCD 2351, LTM and 2014, FBN 15 CD, Factory Benelux)
- Secret Stories (2003), LTMCD 2353, LTM
- Standstill to Motion (2012), LTMCD 2566, LTM - CD/DVD

=== Nasmak ===
- Nasmak Plus Instruments/Instruments Plus Nasmak (Plurex, 1980)
- Indecent Exposure 1 & 2 (Music For Brass, Wood, Drums And Violins) (cassette, self-released, 1981)
- Indecent Exposure 3 & 4 (The Smell Remains) (Plurex, 1981)
- 4our Clicks (Plurex, 1982)
- Indecent Exposure 5 & 6 (Only This Day And 77 Others) (Plurex, 1982)
- Duel (Plurex, 1983)
- Silhouette (Plurex, 1983)

=== Tox Modell ===
- Parkhof 11/04/1981 C30 cassette (Lebel PERIOD, Amsterdam 1981)
- Groote Keyser 21-3-81 C46 cassette (Lebel PERIOD, Amsterdam 1981)

=== The Young Lions ===
- No News, Strange Rumours, Plurex 0013 (Amsterdam, 1980)
- Small World (live at Ultra, cassette), Amphibious (Amsterdam, 1983)

=== Compilations ===
- Ultra - Octopus Amsterdam, C90 cassette (Lebel PERIOD, Amsterdam 1981)

== Literature ==
- Harold Schellinx, ULTRA. Opkomst en ondergang van de Ultramodernen, een unieke Nederlandse muziekstroming (1978-1983), Lebowski Publishers, Amsterdam, 2012. ISBN 9789048812400.
- Dirk Polak. Mecano: een muzikaal egodocument. Lebowski Publishers, Amsterdam, 2011. ISBN 978-9048851751
- Oscar Smit. De Paradiso Punk Jaren Deel 4: 1979-1981 Nederpunk(s) En Ultra.Black Olive Press, Amstelveen, 2021. ISBN 9789072811271.
- Foster, R. (2020), Mapping Subcultures from Scratch: Moving Beyond the Mythology of Dutch Post-Punk.

In: van der Steen, B., Verburgh, T. (eds) Researching Subcultures, Myth and Memory. Palgrave Studies in the History of Subcultures and Popular Music. Palgrave Macmillan, Cham.

- Richard Foster, “Afwijkende mensen.” Formulating perspectives on the Dutch ULTRA scene. studenttheses Universiteit Leiden
