= List of music artists and bands from Manchester =

This is a list of music artists and bands from Manchester, and may also include some people or bands who hail from the wider area of Greater Manchester, in England.

== 0–9 ==
- 10cc
- 52nd Street
- 808 State
- The 1975

== A ==
- A II Z
- A Guy Called Gerald
- Barry Adamson
- Stuart Adamson
- Addictive
- AIM
- Airship
- Aitch
- Stu Allan
- Alberto y Lost Trios Paranoias
- Alfie
- Alpinestars
- Amplifier
- The Answering Machine
- Richard Ashcroft
- Audioweb
- Autechre

== B ==
- Badly Drawn Boy
- Bandit Queen
- Barclay James Harvest
- BBC Philharmonic
- B.C. Camplight
- Beady Eye
- Norman Beaker
- Beau Leisure
- Bee Gees
- Beecher
- Bez
- Big Flame
- Billy Ruffian
- Bipolar Sunshine
- Caoilfhionn Rose Birley
- Biting Tongues
- Black Grape
- Blackout Crew
- Black Rivers
- Blue Orchids
- Blossoms
- The Bodines
- Tim Booth
- John Bramwell
- Brassy
- Brian and Michael
- Brigade
- Brix & the Extricated
- Elkie Brooks
- Ian Brown
- kyla Brox
- Victor Brox
- Mark Burgess
- Tim Burgess
- Bugzy Malone
- Buzzcocks

== C ==
- Cabbage
- The Cape Race
- The Caretaker (musician)
- Elsie Carlisle
- Carmel
- A Certain Ratio
- The Chameleons
- Diane Charlemagne
- The Chemical Brothers
- Cherry Ghost
- John Cooper Clarke
- Cleopatra
- The Clint Boon Experience
- Clock (British group)
- The Colourfield
- JP Cooper
- Courteeners
- Brian Cox
- Crazy P
- The Creepers
- Crispy Ambulance
- Crywank

== D ==
- D Ream
- The Dakotas
- Daley
- Dare
- Delphic
- Demdike Stare
- Diana Vickers
- Dirty North
- The Distractions
- Doves
- The Drones
- Billy Duffy
- The Durutti Column
- Dutch Uncles

== E ==
- Easterhouse
- Egyptian Hip Hop
- Elbow
- Electronic
- Emergency
- Everything Everything

== F ==
- Factory Star
- The Fall
- Georgie Fame and the Blue Flames
- Graham Fellows AKA Jilted John
- Findlay (musician)
- Fingathing
- Hughie Flint
- Floating Points
- George Formby
- Frantic Elevators
- Freebass
- Freddie and the Dreamers
- Freeloaders
- The French (later, The French 8083)
- The Freshies
- Stephen Fretwell
- Liam Frost
- Martin Fry
- The Future Sound of London
- Futurecop!

• Freya Skye

== G ==
- Liam Gallagher
- Noel Gallagher
- Noel Gallagher's High Flying Birds
- Geko
- Andy Gibb
- Andy Gill
- David Gray
- Godley & Creme
- GoGo Penguin
- Goldblade
- Jimi Goodwin
- The Guest List
- A Guy Called Gerald

== H ==
- Matthew Halsall
- Peter Hammill
- Happy Mondays
- Mike Harding
- Ren Harvieu
- Herman's Hermits
- Robert Heaton
- HENGE
- The High
- Tom Hingley
- Tom Hingley and the Lovers
- The Hoax
- The Hollies
- Hotlegs
- Hot Milk
- Mick Hucknall
- Hurts

== I ==
- IAMDDB
- I Am Kloot
- Inca Babies
- Ingested
- Inspiral Carpets
- Intastella
- Ist Ist

== J ==
- Martin Jackson
- James
- Jan Johnston
- Jon the Postman
- Danny Jones
- Davy Jones
- Joy Division

== K ==
- Kalima
- Jay Kay
- Kevin Kennedy (actor)
- Kid British
- Kill II This
- Kinesis
- King of the Slums

== L ==
- Lamb
- The Lathums
- Lavolta Lakota
- Edward Lisbona
- Lonelady
- The Longcut
- Longview
- The Lottery Winners
- Lovefreekz
- Loveland
- Love to Infinity
- Ludus
- Luxuria

== M ==
- M People
- Magazine
- Bugzy Malone
- Man from Delmonte
- Mangled After Dinner
- Mani AKA Gary Mounfield
- Marconi Union
- Marion
- Johnny Marr
- Maruja
- John Mayall
- John Mayall & the Bluesbreakers
- MC Tunes
- Meekz
- Militia
- Pip Millett
- The Mindbenders
- Mint Royale
- Minute Taker
- Misha B
- Mr. Scruff
- Mock Turtles
- Molly Half Head
- Monaco
- Money
- Monomania
- Morrissey
- The Mothmen
- Muslimgauze

== N ==
- Graham Nash
- N-Trance
- New Fast Automatic Daffodils
- New Order
- Nine Black Alps
- Jim Noir
- Peter Noone
- Northern Uproar
- Northside
- The Nosebleeds

== O ==
- Oasis
- Oceansize
- Omerta
- The Other Two
- The Outfield
- Owl Project

== P ==
- Pale Waves
- Paris Angels
- The Passage
- Ben Pearce
- Genesis P-Orridge
- Proud Mary
- Puressence
- Push Baby

== Q ==
- Quando Quango

== R ==
- Rae & Christian
- The Railway Children
- Vini Reilly
- Reni, born Alan Wren
- Revenge
- Revenge of the Psychotronic Man
- Lou Rhodes
- Marc Riley and The Creepers
- Rivers & Robots
- Ruthless Rap Assassins

== S ==
- Sad Café
- Salford Jets
- Dave Sharp
- Shirehorses
- Frank Sidebottom
- Simian
- Simply Red
- Sixty Minute Man
- Peter Skellern
- Slaughter & the Dogs
- The Slow Readers Club
- The Smirks
- The Smiths
- Tim Scott (guitarist)
- Solstice
- Sonic Boom Six
- Space Monkeys
- John Squire
- Stack Waddy
- Lisa Stansfield
- Starsailor
- Stay+
- Stockholm Monsters
- The Stone Roses
- Andy Stott
- Sub Sub
- Suns of Arqa
- Sweet Female Attitude
- Sweet Sensation
- Swing Out Sister
- Swiss Lips
- Sylvia Tella

== T ==
- Take That
- TCTS
- Theatre of Hate
- The Ting Tings
- The Toggery Five
- TOKOLOSH
- Tractor
- Truthpaste
- The Trend
- Turrentine Jones
- Twang
- Twisted Wheel

== V ==
- Van der Graaf Generator
- The Verve
- Virginia Wolf
- Victoria Wood

== W ==
- The Waltones
- Shayne Ward
- Warsaw
- Russell Watson
- Westside Cowboy
- When in Rome
- The Whip
- Laura White
- Melanie Williams
- Winterfylleth
- A Witness
- Wode
- Working for a Nuclear Free City
- WU LYF

== Y ==
- Yargo
- Paul Young (singer, born 1947)

== See also ==
- Cargo Studios
- The Hacienda
- List of music artists and bands from England
- Lists of musicians
- List of people from Manchester
- Manchester Arena
- Manchester Central
- Madchester
- Music of Manchester
