= Does It Matter Irene? =

Single by The Mothmen
- A-side: "Does It Matter Irene?"
- B-side: "Please Let Go"
- Released: September 1979
- Recorded: Andy Maca
- Genre: Post-punk, new wave
- Label: Absurd

The Mothmen singles chronology
"Does It Matter Irene?" (1979)	"Show Me Your House and Car" (1981)

"Does It Matter Irene?" is the first disc released by post-punk group the Mothmen, on Absurd Records, in 1979. Shortly before, the band members were involved with two known Manchester bands, guitarist/bassist Dave Rowbotham, bassist/guitarist Tony Bowers and drummer Chris Joyce with the Durutti Column and vocalist Bob Harding with Alberto Y Lost Trios Paranoias. Bowers also was member of Alberto Y Lost Trios Paranoias before the Durutti Column.

This was the only single released on Absurd. The band later signed to Do It! to release in 1981 their first album Pay Attention! and their next single "Show Me Your House and Car".

However, the band waited the entire 1980 working in separated ways. Dave Rowbotham was recording material with Pauline Murray and the Invisible Girls, Chris Joyce joined Pink Military, with whom he began to work, and Tony Bowers was producing for the latter band.

The single's B-side, "Please Let Go", was later re-versioned for the debut album Pay Attention!.

== Track listing ==
A-side

1. "Does It Matter Irene?"

B-side

1. "Please Let Go"

== Credits ==
- Bob Harding: lead vocals, guitar, bass guitar, organ
- David Rowbotham: guitar, bass
- Tony Bowers: bass, guitar, violin, vocals
- Chris Joyce: drums
