= Colin Sharp =

English actor (1953–2009)

- Born: Colin Ainsley Sharp; 5 September 1953; United Kingdom
- Died: 7 September 2009 (aged 56); Newcastle upon Tyne, Tyne and Wear, England
- Occupations: Actor; educator; percussionist; singer-songwriter
- Known for: • Singer of The Durutti Column • College drama educator in Newcastle

Colin Ainsley Sharp (5 September 1953 – 7 September 2009) was an English actor, biographer, percussionist and singer-songwriter, who was part of the Manchester music scene of the late 1970s and dedicated to arts in Newcastle upon Tyne.

== Career ==
In the late 1970s, he joined post-punk band The Durutti Column as singer during the last months of 1978, replacing original vocalist Phil Rainford. The band featured Vini Reilly and Dave Rowbotham as guitarists and future Simply Red members Tony Bowers on bass and Chris Joyce on drums. With him, the band continued to play live performances and recorded two songs, "No Communication" and "Thin Ice (Detail)", for the A Factory Sample EP (a various artist compilation which featured also other artists from Factory Records (label who signed the band): Joy Division, Cabaret Voltaire and John Dowie). Shortly afterwards, only Reilly remained in the band.

In 1978, by the time he joined and left The Durutti Column, he formed a glam-punk band, The Roaring 80s, who were active until their split in 1981, opening shows for Magazine, Joy Division and others.

In 1983, he founded, in Newcastle, the rock band SF Jive, which lasted until 1990; he was the band's vocalist and percussionist.

In 1988, he formed an experimental music trio called Glow, but they were active only one year.

In 2006, he reappeared in the post-punk scene, when his collaboration with American band Vernian Process was released within the band's second album The Forgotten Age. It included the song "Where Are The Young Men?", which Sharp composed in memory of his late friends who were part of the new wave music scene, including Ian Curtis, Martin Hannett, Billy Mackenzie, Adrian Borland.

In 2007, he published his book Who Killed Martin Hannett? – The History of Factory Records' Musical Magician, a biography of his close friend, the producer Martin Hannett.

He taught drama at Tyne Metropolitan College until July 2008.

== Acting ==
Between 1979 and 2005, Sharp appeared in several television and film productions.

== Death ==
Sharp died, age 56, after suffering a brain haemorrhage.

== Bibliography ==
- Sharp, Colin (2007). Who Killed Martin Hannett? – The History of Factory Records' Musical Magician. London: Aurum Press. ISBN 978-1-845-13174-6.

== See also ==
- List of biographers
- List of English writers
- List of music artists and bands from Manchester
- List of people from Newcastle upon Tyne
- List of percussionists
- List of rock musicians
- List of singers
