= The Teardrops (UK band) =

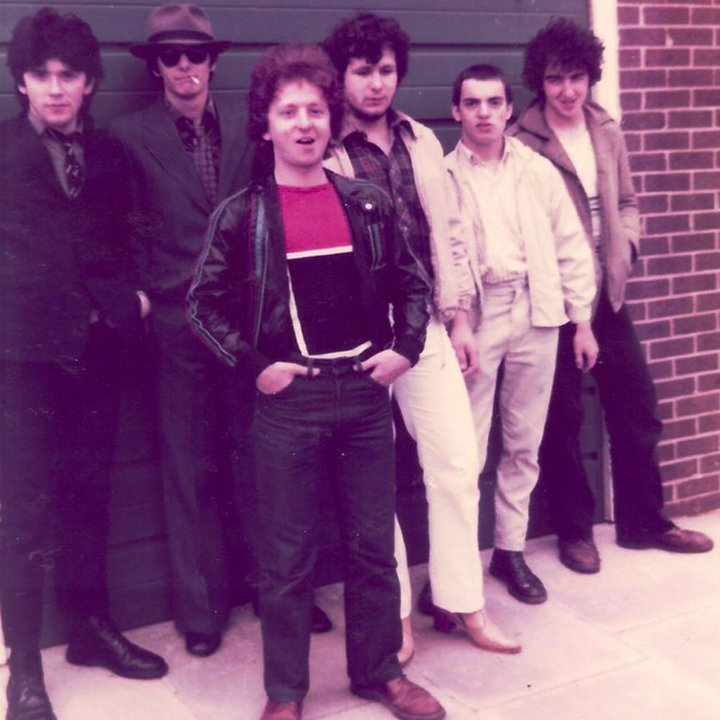

Background information
- Origin: Manchester, England
- Genres: Punk rock, new wave
- Years active: 1978–1981
- Labels: Bent Records; TJM Records; Blind Eye Records
- Past members: Trevor Wain; John Key; Jimmy Donnelly; Steve Garvey; Martin Bramah; Karl Burns; Dave Brisbane; Tony Friel; Helen Harbrook; Dave Price

The Teardrops were an English punk/new wave band formed in Manchester, England, in 1978. The founders and always the core of this band were Trevor Wain, John Key and Jimmy Donnelly with various good friends from the Prestwich music scene:- Buzzcocks bassist Steve Garvey, members of The Fall; Martin Bramah, Karl Burns and Tony Friel and former member of V2 Ian Nance, as well as occasional contributions from Dave Brisbane, Helen Harbrook, Dave Price and Rick Goldstraw.

== History ==
Initially, the band line up was, (as pictured) Steve Garvey then in Buzzcocks, Martin Bramah who was in The Fall at that time, Trevor Wain, Jimmy Donnelly, John Key and Karl Burns who, at that time, was also in The Fall. It was this line-up with the addition of Dave Brisbane that recorded (at Cargo Studios) and released their debut EP, In And Out Of Fashion. Because of contractual difficulties with The Fall the band were never able to credit Martin Bramah or Karl Burns on the record sleeve.

Due to the communal nature of the band it was not always clear who, apart Trevor Wain, Jimmy Donnelly and John Key were in the band at anyone time. By the end of 1978 Steve Garvey was committed to his work in Buzzcocks. Martin Bramah in 1979 had left The Fall to form Blue Orchids with Una Baines. Karl Burns also left The Fall in 1979 and continued to make a strong contribution to the band. Tony Friel who had left The Fall in 1977 to form The Passage with Dick Witts helped out on some tracks. Most of the recordings at this period varied between Cargo Studios in Rochdale with John Brierley, Smile Studios and Arrow Studios in Manchester. When Graveyard Studios opened in Prestwich all subsequent recordings were done there. The Teardrops along with all their associated groups recorded there as well as a lot of other Manchester bands including Joy Division and A Certain Ratio.

By the end of 1980, The Teardrops stopped recording.

In 2010, a further set of tapes from the Graveyard Studio sessions were rediscovered and restored by Blind Eye Records. This format of the group contained the stalwarts Trevor Wain, Jimmy Donnelly and John Key along with Ian Nance. The recordings contain contributions from Steve Garvey, Martin Bramah and Karl Burns. Blind Eye Records were reportedly planning to release a series of 7" singles on vinyl in 2010 but as of 2023 no such releases have ever appeared.

They undertook gigs at The Russell Club (Factory Nights) in Hulme and Eric's in Liverpool with Private Sector, Fast Cars and V2.

== Discography ==
- In and Out of Fashion EP (1978)
- Leave Me No Choice EP (1978)
- "Seeing Double" single (TJM, July 1979)
- Final Vinyl album (Illuminated, January 1980)

=== Compilation appearances ===
- Identity Parade (1980)
- White Dopes on Punk - 50 Punk Nuggets & New Wave Rarities (double-disc) (Castle, 2005)
