= Seeing Double (song) =

Single by The Teardrops
- A-side: "Seeing Double"
- B-side: "Teardops and Heartaches"
- Released: July 1979
- Recorded: Smile studios
- Genre: Punk rock
- Label: TJM Records
- Songwriters: Karl Burns, Trev Wain, John Key, Jim Donnelly
- Producer: The Teardrops

The Teardrops singles chronology
| "Leave Me No Choice EP" (1978) | "Seeing Double" (1979) |

"Seeing Double" is the first 7" single of English new wave band the Teardrops, released on TJM Records, in 1979.

The band comprised John Key, Trev Wain, Karl Burns (ex-Fall drummer) and Jim Donnelly, being credited in the black sleeve of the single. Initially, Steve Garvey, then of Buzzcocks, was also a member, but he did not participate on this disc, despite having played in the two first EPs, In and Out of Fashion and Leave Me No Choice in 1978; however, according to the list of the discography of all the Buzzcocks members, he played, only with Burns and also ex-Fall member Tony Friel.

== Track listing ==
A. "Seeing Double" (Burns/Wain)
B. "Teardrops and Heartaches" (Wain/Key)

== Credits ==
Band

- John Key
- Trev Wain
- Karl Burns
- Jim Donnely

Production

- The Teardrops
