= Motivation (band) =

UK musical group

- Origin: Greater Manchester, England
- Genres: Rock
- Years active: 1981–1985
- Past members: Steve Garvey; Dave Price; Dave Rowbotham; Snuff

Motivation was a short-lived band formed in Manchester, England by bassist and probably leader Steve Garvey, guitarist Dave Rowbotham, drummer Snuff and vocalist Dave Price. Garvey was a former Buzzcocks, Teardrops and Bok Bok member, while Rowbotham was previously in The Durutti Column and then in The Mothmen.

== History ==
The band was formed by Steve Garvey, Dave Rowbotham, Snuff and Dave Price by 1980. The first two had some trajectory in the Manchester musical scene at the time: Garvey was famous for being the bassist of the punk band Buzzcocks, although he was involved in two new wave groups at the time, The Teardrops and Bok Bok, and Rowbotham was in the early line-up of post-punk band The Durutti Column, sharing the guitarist role with Vini Reilly, and after departing, he alongside other ex-members of the band formed The Mothmen, in which he was still involved at the time Motivation formed.

The band were managed by former Buzzcocks manager Richard Boon. Boon claimed in an interview at the time that Motivation sounded like 1976 bands, which indicated the group sounded like pre-punk formations or the first punk bands. Andy Hieke and Colin Robinson from Night Visitors were their sound engineers.

By 1983, Garvey (who was playing with Blue Orchids, in parallel with Motivation) and Price moved to New York, but the band continued, with Garvey as the only known remaining member.

The band was forced to change its name to Shy Talk and was signed to Columbia records in the U.S., releasing one album, Shy Talk, in 1985. The album was produced by Procol Harum's Pete Solley. At this time the line-up consisted of Dave Price (vocals), Michael Nehra (guitars), Phil Garmyn (bass), David Bravo (keyboards) and John Morelli (drums). Steve Garvey is thanked in the album credits but did not perform on the album.

Snuff joined Distant Cousins in the late 1980s. Garvey reformed Buzzcocks in 1989 but quit in 1992 due to health problems. In 1991, Rowbotham, who passed in the 1980s as a session musician for Factory Records, was killed by an axe murderer in his flat.

== Bibliography ==
- Gimarc, George. Post punk Diary: 1980-82. St. Martin's Press, 1997.
