= Final Vinyl (The Teardrops album) =

Studio album by The Teardrops
- Released: January 1980
- Genre: Post-punk, new wave
- Label: Illuminated Records
- Producer: Karl Burns

Professional ratings
Review scores
| Source | Rating |
|---|---|
| AllMusic | 3/5 stars |

Final Vinyl is the only album released by English new wave band the Teardrops. It was released in January 1980, shortly before the band dissolved.

The band were formed by Buzzcocks bassist Steve Garvey, ex-the Fall bassist Tony Friel, Trev Waine, Helen Barbrook and Bok Bok. The latter could be a two-people pseudonym of Karl Burns, who also was in the Fall and was in the Teardrops, but was not credited, and Dave Price; they added Steve Garvey in the project called as that probably stage name, releasing one single, "Come Back to Me", in May 1980.

Steve Huey, of AllMusic, declared it "reflects its members' involvement in such groups as the Buzzcocks and the Fall", while Ira Robbins, of Trouser Press, wrote it "is very inconsistent—too much mucking about in the studio ruins the decent tracks with spurious talking and noises—but there is some fine music here that hovers between the Buzzcocks and the Sex Pistols."

The first disc song, "Everything's O.K.", is the other version of the B-side song of the "Seeing Double" single, "Teardrops and Heartaches".

== Track listing ==
=== A-side ===
1. "Everything's O.K."
2. "No One Is Innocent"
3. "Hey Count De Bok Bok"
4. "Teenage Vice"

=== B-side ===
1. "Meet the Teardrops"
2. "Some People"
3. "Slow Glass"
4. "Fackin Kant"
5. "Time to Go"

== Personnel ==
- Steve Garvey
- Tony Friel
- Bok Bok (probably Karl Burns and Dave Price)
- Trev Waine
- Helen Barbrook
