= Pindrop (album) =

Studio album by The Passage
- Released: November 1980
- Recorded: July 1980
- Studio: Graveyard Studios, Prestwich
- Genre: Post-punk
- Length: 36:41
- Label: Object
- Producer: The Passage

The Passage chronology
| Pindrop (1980) | For All and None (1981) |

Pindrop is the debut studio album by English post-punk band The Passage, released in 1980 by record label Object.

== Reception ==
Professional ratings
Review scores
| Source | Rating |
|---|---|
| AllMusic | 3/5 stars |
| NME | very favourable |
| Sounds | 4/5 stars |
| Trouser Press | very favourable |

Pindrop has received a positive critical reception. NME called it "a word of disciplined intellectual aggression, frantic emotions and powerfully idiomatic musicality". Sounds called the album "as innovative and individual as 154 and Unknown Pleasures were". Trouser Press called it "easily one of the most mysteriously brilliant albums ever".

== Track listing ==
All tracks composed by Dick Witts; all lyrics by Dick Witts except where noted.

Pin side

1. "Fear"
2. "Troops Out"
3. "Carnal"
4. "Watching You Dance"
5. "Hunt"
6. "Anderton's Hall"
7. "From the Heart"

Drop side

1. "Locust"
2. "2711"
3. "16 Hours" (Witts, Tony Friel)
4. "Carmen"
5. "A Certain Way to Go"
6. "Prelude"

== Personnel ==
The Passage

- Dick Witts - vocals, treatments

Technical

- Stewart Pickering - engineer
- Jeremy Greenwood - cover design
