= Mark and Lard =

BBC DJ duo

Mark and Lard is the stage name of Mark Radcliffe (Mark) and Marc Riley (Lard), who presented various weekday shows on BBC Radio 1 from 1991 to March 2004.

== Career ==
Radcliffe, then a Radio 1 producer, began presenting specialist shows on the network in 1991, namely Out on Blue Six, The Guest List and Skyman. During this time, he also hosted Hit the North, a weekly BBC Radio 5 music and comedy show from Manchester with Riley as its researcher, and latterly, co-producer and presenter. Riley also presented his own series, Cult Radio, during the summer of 1993.

On 25 October 1993, the pair transferred to Radio 1 full-time and began presenting a late night show from 10pm-midnight on Mondays-Thursdays, replacing Nicky Campbell's Into the Night. The Graveyard Shift featured a mix of comedy sketches, poetry readings, live sessions and guests, including regular contributors such as Mark Kermode, Mark Lamarr, Stuart Maconie, Simon Armitage, Ian McMillan and Katie Puckrik.

They had presented the Radio 1 Breakfast show as stand-ins for Chris Evans, and after his departure from Radio 1, Mark and Lard took over the flagship show on 17 February 1997. But low ratings led to the pair being replaced; they presented their last show in that time slot on 10 October 1997. Their eight-month tenure was the shortest of any Radio 1 Breakfast Show. Mark and Lard moved to an early afternoon slot (2-4pm, later 1-3pm), where they continued until 26 March 2004.

Throughout the afternoon show's run, regular features included spoof phone-in quizzes such as It's a Sausage Roll, Circle of Chance and Fish or Fowl. Other items on the show included Downcount, Lard's Classic Cuts and Beat the Clock. The pair became well known for a stock of catchphrases such as Biggedy Biggedy Bong, Stop....carry on!, By Jovi, Cabbage Garden and Wickedy Wickedy Warp. One of the many characters on the show was 'Fat Harry White' (Radcliffe with a vocoder) – a thinly disguised parody of soul singer Barry White, this character was so successful he was given his own CD in 1998, entitled Hmmm Baby (The Seduction Selection, which was also his catchphrase) – it peaked at number 83 in the UK charts. During the afternoon show's run, Mark and Lard went on to win three Golds at the Radio Academy Awards.

Throughout their Radio 1 career, the pair produced and broadcast their shows from the BBC North West studios at New Broadcasting House, Manchester – in contrast to the network's London-based content. The studios, closed in November 2011 and later demolished, were invariably dubbed on-air and in Radio Times' schedule billings as The Palace of Glittering Delights.

== Shirehorses ==
Mark and Lard are also the creators of the spoof rock band the Shirehorses, who released two CD albums:

- The Worst...Album in the World...Ever...EVER! - The title is a play on The Best... Album in the World...Ever! compilation series.
- Our Kid Eh – The title is a combination of the contemporary Radiohead album Kid A, and the northern phrase 'our Kid'.

== Leaving Radio 1 ==
In February 2004 the pair announced they were leaving Radio 1, with Radcliffe moving to BBC Radio 2 and Riley moving to BBC Radio 6 Music. Their last show was broadcast on 26 March 2004 and featured a guest appearance by Travis, messages of commiseration from Neil Hannon, Radiohead, Blur (Damon Albarn composed a special song but "broke down in tears" before finishing it) and Kelly Jones of The Stereophonics, whom they'd frequently insulted during the show's run. They also received a bouquet of flowers from Paul McCartney. At the end of their last show, Riley sat in the silent studio sighing. Radcliffe convinces him to buck up and come to the pub to buy him a drink. But they had time for a swift half a catchphrase: "Stop!" Then the door closed and the show was over. It was followed by a silence of some twenty seconds causing the network to switch to the emergency tape; this was believed to be a final opportunity to make a nuisance of themselves, but was a result of show overrunning and studio staff in London not being in place when the show finally ended.

They subsequently worked together on the Mark & Lard's Football Nightmares DVD. They had previously presented Match of the Nineties, which showed highlights of English football seasons from 1989 to 1999, during the summer of 1999.

== Carry On: An Evening with Mark and Lard ==
On Thursday 25 January 2024, Craig Charles, on his BBC 6 Music radio show, announced that there would be a one off live show where Mark and Lard would reunite on 24 March 2024 at The Bowden Rooms, Altrincham with a live stream going out at the same time on YouTube.

== An Audience with Mark and Lard ==
Following the success of An Evening with Mark and Lard, they embarked on a touring stage production titled An Audience with Mark and Lard later the same year. The show has continued to tour UK venues into 2026.

Media offices
Preceded by Chris Evans	BBC Radio 1 Breakfast Show Presenter; 1997	Succeeded by Kevin Greening and Zoe Ball
