= Our Kid Eh =

Studio album by the Shirehorses
- Released: 14 May 2001
- Genre: Comedy, Parody
- Length: 41:19
- Label: Columbia

The Shirehorses chronology
The worst album...in the world...ever...EVER! (1997)	Our Kid Eh (2001)

Our Kid Eh is the second album from the spoof band the Shirehorses, comprising two BBC Radio 1 DJs, Mark Radcliffe and Marc Riley (a.k.a. Mark and Lard). This album's title is a play on the name of Radiohead's 2000 album Kid A.

Our Kid Eh reached #20 on the UK Albums Chart.

== Track listing ==
1. "If You Tolerate This Piss" - Manic Street Sweepers - 3:29 ("If You Tolerate This Your Children Will Be Next" - Manic Street Preachers) - An unhappy drinker in a student union bar laments the poor quality of the alcoholic beverages on sale.
2. "No Big Sizes" - Radioshed - 3:08 ("No Surprises" - Radiohead)
3. "Arseholes" - Robbie & William - 3:30 ("Angels" - Robbie Williams) - An unhappy gay couple express (in graphic detail) dissatisfaction with each other's physical attributes.
4. "Why Is It Always Dairylea" - Dave Lee Travisty - 2:48 ("Why Does It Always Rain On Me?" - Travis; the artist refers to 1980s Radio 1 DJ Dave Lee Travis) - A touring band express dissatisfaction with the various brands of processed cheeses provided on their rider in lieu of the traditionally made cheeses they requested.
5. "Fucking Around" - Dave Lee Travisty - 2:40 ("Coming Around" - Travis)
6. "Pardon?" - Indecipherable Boys - 1:59 ("Intergalactic" - Beastie Boys)
7. "Quorn Medley" - Status Quorn - 2:49 (Medley of "Whatever You Want", "Paper Plane", "Rockin' All Over The World", "Down Down", "Caroline" - Status Quo)
8. "Bellow" - Foreplay - 3:17 ("Yellow" - Coldplay)
9. "A Roll with It" - Po-Fasis - 2:31 ("Roll with It" - Oasis)
10. "Horny" - Chocolate Mousse Tea - 1:47 ("Horny" - Mousse T. Vs Hot 'n' Juicy)
11. "Feel Like Shite" - Doofergrass - 1:56 ("Alright" - Supergrass)
12. "Country Spouse" - Blurb - 2:53 ("Country House" - Blur)
13. "Tony" - M&M Featuring Bridie From The Canteen - 6:23 ("Stan" - Eminem featuring Dido) - A seemingly deranged individual named Tony stalks Mark Radcliffe.
14. "Planet Of Sound" - The Pixiedancers - 2:05 ("Planet of Sound" - Pixies)
- Information in brackets indicates original songs and artists.
