= Mothmen =

Mothmen may refer to:

- The Mothmen, an English post-punk band
- Mothman, a humanoid creature in American folklore
