= Oliver Wilde =

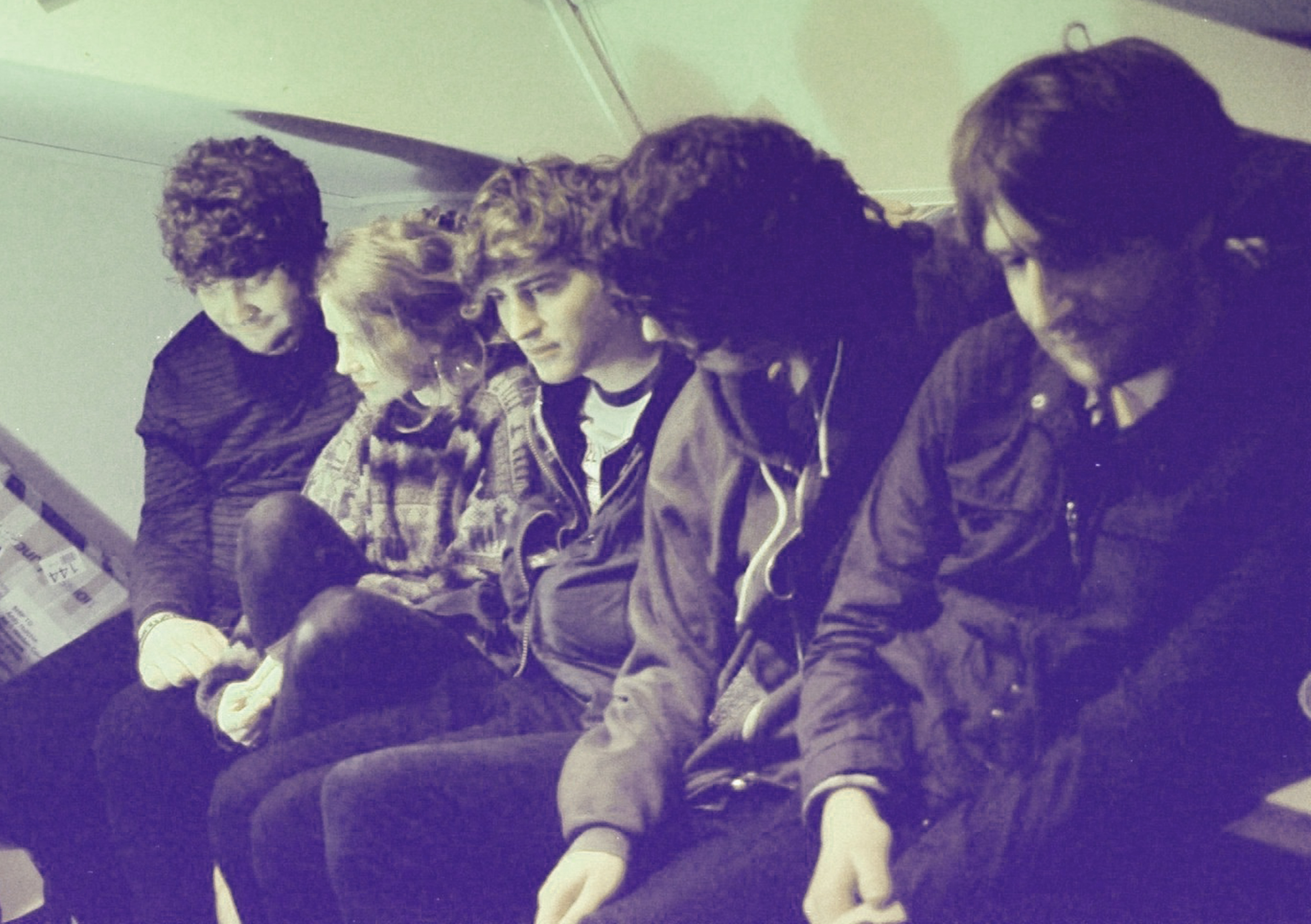
- Oliver Wilde

Background information
- Born: 21 October 1988 (age 38); Swindon, Wiltshire
- Genres: Indie rock; folk; folktronica; shoegaze; electronic
- Occupations: singer-songwriter; musician
- Labels: Howling Owl Records, Art Is Hard Records

Oliver Wilde (born 21 October 1988) is an English musician, poet, and producer currently based in Bristol, England. Wilde is noted for his unique bedroom production sound and lo-fi style, fusing folk, electronica, laptop pop and indie coupled with a melancholic, hushed singing. Oliver Wilde released his first album A Brief Introduction To Unnatural Lightyears in July 2013 via Bristol indie label Howling Owl Records. The album gained critical acclaim from The Guardian, labeling the album as "astonishing" and NME, who described him as "a Nick Drake for the 21st Century". In November that year, Wilde and his band were invited to BBC 6 Music to do a live session for DJ Marc Riley, and in January 2014 aired a new live session on Huw Stephens' BBC Radio 1 show.

Wilde quickly released his second album Red Tide Opal in the Loose End Womb in May 2014, again gaining strong critical acclaim, and significant breakthroughs on BBC 6 Music including 'Album of the Day' and playlists for 'Play & Be Saved' and 'Stomach Full Of Cats'. With Oliver Wilde now a fully expanded band, headline UK tours (including a sold-out show at Colston Hall 2 in his adopted home, Bristol) and a summer of festivals including The Great Escape Latitude Festival and End of The Road through that summer.

== Discography ==
=== Solo albums ===
- A Brief Introduction To Unnatural Lightyears (2013)
- Red Tide Opal in the Loose End Womb (2014)
- Post-Frenz Container Buzz (2017)

=== Solo EPs ===
- Long Hold Star An Infinite Abduction (2016)

=== Solo mixtapes ===
- ...And This Is Where The Tragic Happens (2017)

=== Solo other ===
- Yuletide (Christmas Single with EBU) (2015)
- Without You, Die Hard's Not The Same (Oliver Wilde & Herbal Tea) (2018)

=== Albums as Oro Swimming Hour ===
- Penrose Winoa (2017)
- Lossy (2019)
- Pteradactyl (2020)

=== Albums as Pet Shimmers ===
- Face Down in Meta (2020)
- Trash Earthers (2020)
- Anon Playable Cloud (2022)
