= Steve Garvey (musician) =

- Born: Stephen Garvey; 8 January 1958 (age 68); Manchester, England
- Genres: Punk rock, new wave, post-punk
- Occupations: Musician, record producer, impresario, carpenter
- Instrument: Bass guitar
- Years active: 1977–1992
- Labels: United Artists Records, Virgin Records, New Hope Sound & Vision
- Website: MySpace: Steve (official MySpace site); MySpace: New Hope and Vision

Stephen Garvey (born 8 January 1958) is an English musician who is known for being the bass guitarist of the punk band Buzzcocks, forming part of the classic line-up of the group, from 1977 to 1981, and, again, from 1989 to 1992.

== Biography ==
=== Original Buzzcocks years ===
Garvey was born in Manchester, England. After working in a petrol station, he joined Buzzcocks as bass guitarist in late 1977, replacing erstwhile bassist Garth Smith shortly after the release of the Orgasm Addict single. He was with Buzzcocks for their first three albums: Another Music in a Different Kitchen, Love Bites and A Different Kind of Tension, and his work features on the majority of the compilation Singles Going Steady. The group disbanded in 1981.

=== Other bands and collaborations ===
From 1978 to 1980, in parallel with Buzzcocks, he was a member of The Teardrops, which was mostly his school band, along with The Fall's Karl Burns, Martin Bramah and Tony Friel, who released two EPs in 1978, In and out of Fashion and Leave Me No Choice, and a 7" single in 1979, Seeing Double, as well as an album called Final Vinyl in 1980. Shortly after the release of the album, it seems the band changed their name to Bok Bok, and consisted of Garvey, Burns and a singer and guitarist called Dave Price. They then released a 7" single, Come Back To Me backed with "Misfit", which made single of the week in the Record Mirror.

After Buzzcocks split up in 1981, he continued working with his ex-Buzzcocks bandmates; with lead vocalist and guitarist Pete Shelley on his Homosapien album; and with guitarist Steve Diggle, on the 50 Years of Comparative Wealth EP (1981).

By 1981, he formed a band called Motivation, along with Dave Price (vocals), Dave Rowbotham (guitar) (previously in The Durutti Column, and then in The Mothmen) and Snuff (drums) (later in Distant Cousins). This band was forced to change their name to Shy Talk and was signed to Columbia Records in the U.S. releasing one album, but by this time Garvey was no longer involved "they turned us into a Duran Duran clone, I rejected what it became" he was quoted as saying, although he is thanked in the album credits.

During his last years living in England, he joined post-punk band Blue Orchids, playing bass while they were playing alongside Velvet Underground's Nico.

He produced power pop band Private Sector's "Just Wanna Stay Free" single, in 1979, and some works of Night Visitors at Graveyard Studios, in Prestwich.

=== Buzzcocks reunion (1989–1992) ===
Buzzcocks reunited in 1989. However, Garvey left the band in 1992 due to health problems, one of them being a non-lethal cancerous tumor on his cheek.

=== Post-Buzzcocks years (1992–present) ===
Since around 1993, when he left Buzzcocks, he has lived in New Hope, Bucks County, Pennsylvania. Previously, he was living in an apartment in Greenwich Village, Manhattan, New York.

In the 2000s, he founded a label/production company called "New Hope Sound and Vision" and has produced several local acts notably James Seward (musician), Damn River, Inbred, Behn Wolfe, Less Pain Forever, Pete Chambers, as well as videos with his son Kyle.

In 2008, he was panelist of the Howl Festival Punk Panel, at Bowery Poetry Club, during the Howl Fest, in East Village, New York. Other panellists included Richard Lloyd (Television), Ari Up (Slits), Cynthia Sley (Bush Tetras), Judy Nylon (Snatch), Walter Lure (The Heartbreakers) and Arturo Vega ( designer of the Ramones logo).

In 2012, he played with Buzzcocks at their "Back To Front" tour in Manchester 02 Academy on 25 May and London's O2 Academy Brixton the following day. These gigs consisted of three different line-ups of Buzzcocks.

His cousin is Tony McGuinness, the former bass player of Irish band Aslan.

He is married to Debra, with whom he has two sons, Kyle (born c. 1990) and Ian (born c. 1987).
