= Final Vinyl =

Final Vinyl may refer to:

- Final Vinyl (Hot Tuna album), 1979
- Final Vinyl (The Teardrops album), 1980

== See also ==
- Finyl Vinyl, a 1986 Rainbow album
- Finyl Vinyl, a 2024 Canned Heat album
