= Sundew (disambiguation) =

Sundew can refer to:

- Sundew (album), a 1991 album by the Paris Angels
- Sundew (dragline)
- USCGC Sundew (WLB-404)
- The plant genus Drosera
- The sundew family Droseraceae
- SunDew, the original name for the computer windowing system NeWS
