= Digital (Joy Division song) =

Song by Joy Division

from the album A Factory Sample
- Released: December 1978
- Recorded: 11 October 1978
- Studio: Cargo Studios, Rochdale
- Genre: Post-punk
- Length: 2:50
- Label: Factory
- Songwriter(s): Bernard Sumner; Peter Hook; Stephen Morris; Ian Curtis
- Producer(s): Martin Hannett, Joy Division

"Digital" is a song by English post-punk band Joy Division, originally released on the 1978 double seven-inch EP entitled A Factory Sample. It was later featured on the 1981 compilation album Still, the 1988 compilation album Substance and the 1997 box set Heart and Soul.

The track was recorded in the band's first session with Martin Hannett as a producer. Recording took place at Cargo Studios in Rochdale, Lancashire on 11 October 1978.

It was the last song ever performed by Joy Division, as it was the final song of the last gig recorded on 2 May 1980 at Birmingham University, just before the suicide of the band's singer Ian Curtis. The entire concert was released on the Still album in 1981; it is also notable for including one of only three known recordings of "Ceremony".

== Other media ==
The song is featured in the films 24 Hour Party People and Control, when Tony Wilson sees the band play for the first time.
