= Pindrop =

Pindrop may refer to:

- Pindrop (album), a 1980 album by The Passage
- Pindrop Security, an American information security company

== See also ==
- Pin Drop Studio, a British arts and entertainment studio
