= Blue Orchids =

English post-punk band

- Origin: Manchester, England
- Genre: Post-punk
- Years active: 1979–2007, 2012–present
- Labels: Tiny Global; Rough Trade; Cherry Red; LTM; Blind Eye
- Members: Martin Bramah; John Paul Moran; De Selby Lewis; Howard Jones; Tansy McNally

Blue Orchids are an English post-punk band. They were formed by Una Baines and Martin Bramah in Manchester in 1979, when Bramah left the Fall, after playing on the band's debut album Live at the Witch Trials. Named by Salford-based punk poet John Cooper Clarke, the band recorded for Rough Trade Records and acted as backing band for German singer Nico before a 25-year period of intermittent activity and fluctuating line-ups.

== Career ==
Having left the Fall, Bramah teamed up with two other former Fall members, keyboardist Una Baines and guitarist Rick Goldstraw, as well as bassist Steve Toyne and drummer Ian Rogers (AKA Joe Kin). John Cooper Clarke suggested the name 'The Blessed Orchids' but according to Bramah, Goldstraw mis-remembered it as 'The Blue Orchids' and the name stuck.

Blue Orchids recorded their debut single "Badger Staring Worritly" for Rough Trade Records in 1979; John Peel later described it as capturing "the essence of post-punk Manchester".

The band signed to Rough Trade Records and in November 1980 released their debut single—a double A-side, "The Flood"/"Disney Boys". After this release, Steve Toyne left the band and Rick Goldstraw took over on bass. In February 1981 the group released its second single "Work".

"Work" was much liked by BBC DJ John Peel who played it regularly, and the group was invited to record a Peel session for his show. The band's music came to the attention of Echo & the Bunnymen, who subsequently invited Blue Orchids to be the support act on their 1981 UK tour. Alastair "Baz" Murphy was recruited to play keyboards on the tour, for Baines was ill.

Phillip Toby Toman, an ex-member of The Durutti Column, joined on drums when Ian Rogers left the group after the Echo & the Bunnymen tour (he later went on to play for Primal Scream under the name Toby Tomanov). This new line-up recorded a debut album called The Greatest Hit (Money Mountain), which sold 10,000 copies.

The group toured with Nico, serving as both backing group and support act. Goldstraw decided to leave Blue Orchids to continue touring with Nico, so a new bassist, Mark Hellyer, replaced him. During the time in which the band worked with Nico, Steve Garvey (formerly with Buzzcocks, The Teardrops and Bok Bok, then with Motivation), also played bass with them, shortly before he emigrated to the United States.

The group's next record was the Agents of Change EP in 1982. After parting company with Rough Trade at the end of the year, the group split up, and Baines formed The Fates.

Bramah and Baines briefly reconvened the Blue Orchids in 1985 with the single "Sleepy Town", after which the group split up again. Bramah then formed a new group with ex-Fall drummer Karl Burns called Thirst. This group only released one record—the Riding the Times EP, in 1987.

In 1989, Bramah briefly returned to the Fall and appeared on the Extricate album. He was sacked from the group during its tour of Australia the following year.

In 1991, Bramah returned with a new incarnation of Blue Orchids which featured ex-Smiths guitarist Craig Gannon on guitar, Martin Hennin on bass and Dick Harrison on drums. Their first release was a single called "Diamond Age", followed in 1991 by a compilation album called A View from the City. In 1992 they released the Secret City EP. A second album was recorded in 1993, but this remained unreleased for ten years. Bramah decided to split the group again in 1995.

In 2002, a compilation album titled A Darker Bloom was released on the Cherry Red label. This release had sleeve notes written by Bramah's former colleague in The Fall, BBC DJ Marc Riley, who said of them: "Think Tom Verlaine guesting with The Doors ... one of the most engaging and intriguing bands of the 80s".

2003 saw the group reissue three albums on the LTM label. The shelved album from 1993 was finally released with the title The Sleeper. Released almost simultaneously was a compilation album called From Severe to Serene, which featured the group's two Peel Sessions, live tracks and the contents of Thirst's Riding the Times EP. At the end of the year the group's debut album The Greatest Hit (Money Mountain) was reissued on CD.

In 2004, LTM also released a brand new Blue Orchids album called Mystic Bud. It contained a cover version of Sugar, Sugar by the Archies alongside nine Bramah originals. Founder member Rick Goldstraw returned for the Slum-Cavern-Jest! EP in 2005. This release featured a cover version of the Fred Neil song "Green Rocky Road".

In January 2008, Martin Bramah released his debut solo album The Battle of Twisted Heel.

December 2008 saw the formation of Bramah's new group Factory Star, featuring Tim Lyons and Brian Benson (from the Sandells). They were replaced in April 2009 by fellow ex-Fall members Steve Hanley on bass, Paul Hanley on drums and John Paul Moran (aka Hop Man Jr) of Gnod and Rapid Pig on keyboards. The line-up of Factory Star as of June 2010 was Martin Bramah, Hop Man Jr, Chris Dutton (bass) and Tom Tom Lewis (drums). In January 2012, ex-The Passage drummer Joe Mckechnie replaced Lewis.

In September 2012 the Blue Orchids reformed once again, playing gigs in Liverpool, Manchester and London. The line-up consisted of the Factory Star members Martin Bramah, John Paul Moran, Chris Dutton and Joe McKechnie, with the addition of Ann Matthews (Fflaps/Ectogram) on guitar/vocals. In January 2013, Chris Connolly, formerly of V2 and Ed Banger and long-serving The Glitter Band member, joined on drums. In 2015, Vince Hunt of A Witness and Inca Babies replaced Chris Dutton on bass and the band returned to regular live appearances. In 2017, Chris Connolly was replaced by Howard Jones, formally of Last Harbour, Peterloo Massacre, Kin, Calvin Party.

In 2016, Blue Orchids released a new album, The Once and Future Thing, a retrospective compilation of the Rough Trade years called Awefull, with artwork from celebrated artists Aleksandar Mladenović and Aleksandra Keković Mladenović, plus Bramah's own long-lost solo album The Battle of Twisted Heel on the label Tiny Global Productions, re-shaped the line-up and recorded new songs, including a track for the Stewart Lee–compiled tribute to Birmingham cult band the Nightingales. The band continued to tour and record during 2016.

Blue Orchids have been critically acclaimed by some notable music writers. The NME's Barney Hoskyns said of them "There is an economy of love and yearning in every chord, vocal or instrumental that breaks from the aching heart of the Blue Orchids' sound" while the writer Paul Morley, reviewing their second single "Work" said "They rave but they are not mad."

== Personnel ==
- Martin Bramah – vocals, guitar (1979–)
- Una Baines – keyboards, vocals (1979–85)
- Rick Goldstraw – guitar & bass guitar (1979–82, 2004–2007)
- Steve Toyne – bass (1979–80)
- Ian Rogers A.K.A. Joe Kin – drums (1979–81)
- Phillip Toby Toman – drums (1981–82)
- Steve Garvey – bass (c.1981 – c.1983)
- Mark Hellyer – bass (1982)
- Nick Marshall – drums (1985)
- Chris Rickard – backing vocals (1985)
- Steve Rickard – guitar (1985)
- Craig Gannon – guitar (1990–91)
- Martin Hennin – bass (1990–92)
- Richard Harrison – drums (1990–92)
- Mick Routledge – keyboards (1991–92)
- Adrian White – drums (1993–95)
- Stuart Kennedy – bass (1993–95, 2004)
- Alastair "Baz" Murphy – organ, keyboards (1981–95, 2004)
- Charlotte Bill – flute (2004)
- Bud Umu – drums (2004)
- Steph – drums (2005)
- John Paul Moran – keyboards (2012–)
- Chris Dutton – bass (2012–2015)
- Joe Mckechnie – drums (2012)
- Ann Matthews – guitar, vocals (2012)
- Chris Connolly – drums (2013–2017)
- Vince Hunt – bass (2015–2021)
- Howard Jones – drums (2017 -)
- Tansy McNally – electric ukulele (2020–)
- De Selby Lewis – bass (2022 -)

== Discography ==
Chart placings shown are from the UK Indie Chart.

=== Albums ===
- The Greatest Hit (Money Mountain) (LP, Rough Trade, 1982) (no. 5) - CD reissued, LTM, 2003, appending all Rough Trade non-lp tracks, plus an unrelated live track by Nico.)
- The Sleeper (CD, LTM, 2003 – contains a "missing" 90s album and tracks from contemporaneous singles.)
- Mystic Bud (CD, 2004 – largely a Martin Bramah solo effort, though credited to Blue Orchids.)
- The Battle of Twisted Heel (LP / CD, Tiny Global Productions, 2016 – credited to Martin Bramah, legitimate reissue of a privately pressed recording.)
- The Once And Future Thing (LP / CD, Tiny Global Productions, 2016.)
- Righteous Harmony Fist (LP / CD, Tiny Global Productions, 2018.)
- The Magical Record of Blue Orchids (LP / CD, Tiny Global Productions, 2019.)
- Speed The Day (LP / CD, Tiny Global Productions, 2021.)
- Angus Tempus Memoir (LP / CD, Tiny Global Productions, 2022.)
- Magpie Heights (LP / CD, Tiny Global Productions, 2023.)

=== Compilation albums ===
- A View From The City (CD, Playtime, 1992 – an incomplete selection of tracks from the Rough Trade era.)
- A Darker Bloom (CD, Cherry Red, 2002 – an incomplete selection of tracks from the Rough Trade era, with a few later singles appended.)
- From Severe To Serene (CD, LTM, 2003) – the complete Peel sessions, Thirst's 12" EP recorded for Rough Trade and various live tracks.)
- Awefull (LP / CD, Tiny Global Productions, 2016 – the complete Rough Trade singles, plus rarities.)

=== Live albums ===
- Blue Orchids Bomb Manchester! / Bomb Hamburg! (2xCD, Tiny Global Productions, 2016 – two complete live shows, from 1981 and 1985 respectively.)

=== Singles and EPs ===
- "The Flood" / "Disney Boys" (7", Rough Trade, 1980, no. 36)
- "Work" / "The House That Faded Out" (7", Rough Trade, 1980, no. 21)
- "Agents of Change EP" (12" EP, Rough Trade, 1982, no. 12)
- "Sleepy Town" / "Thirst" (12" EP, Racket Records, 1985, no. 22)
- "Riding The Times EP" (by Thirst) (12" EP, Rough Trade, 1987)
- "Diamond Age" / "Moth" (12" 45, As/Is, 1991)
- "Secret City EP" (CD EP, Authentic Records, 1992)
- "Slum-Cavern-Jest! EP" (CD EP, Blind Eye, 2005 – privately pressed EP, now mostly available as part of "The Battle of Twisted Heel" and credited to Martin Bramah.)
- "Skull Jam EP" (Limited Edition 10" EP, Tiny Global Productions, 2017)
- "Overreactor / Music Of A Werewolf" (Download single, Tiny Global Productions, 2024)

=== Performances with Nico ===
- 18 January 1982 The Venue London
- 25 February 1982 Vera Groningen, Netherlands
- 4 October 1982 Stakladen Aarhus, Denmark
- 5 October 1982 Saltagertet Copenhagen, Denmark
- 6 October 1982 Club Paramount Roskilde, Denmark
- 8 October 1982 Kamraspalatset Stockholm, Sweden
- ? October 1982 Turku, Toimiupseerikerho, Finland
- 5 December 1982 Cologne, Germany
- 12 December 1982 Paris, France
