= A Brief Introduction to Unnatural Lightyears =

A Brief Introduction To Unnatural Lightyears

Studio album by Oliver Wilde
- Released: 23 June 2013
- Genre: Indie Folk
- Length: 48:25
- Label: Howling Owl
- Producer: Oliver Wilde

Oliver Wilde chronology
A Brief Introduction To Unnatural Lightyears (2013)	Red Tide Opal In The Loose End Womb (album) (2014)

A Brief Introduction To Unnatural Lightyears is the debut album by English musician Oliver Wilde, released on 23 June 2013 through Howling Owl.

== Critical reception ==
Professional ratings
Aggregate scores
Source	Rating
AnyDecentMusic?	7.8/10
Review scores
Source	Rating
Line of Best Fit	8/10
DIY	9/10
Drowned In Sound	9/10

At the Album of the Year website, which assigns a normalized rating out of 100 to reviews from mainstream publications, A Brief Introduction to Unnatural Lightyears received an average score of 82, based on 6 reviews, placing it as the 14th highest reviewed album of 2013 by critics. Samme Maine of Drowned in Sound wrote, "As striking as it is beautiful, on A Brief Introduction to Unnatural Light Years, Oliver Wilde has crafted something truly unique."

=== Accolades ===
Publication	Accolade	Rank	Ref.
Crack Magazine	Top 100 Albums of 2013	25	

== Track listing ==
All tracks are written by Oliver Wilde

No.	Title	Length
1.	"Curve (Good Grief)"	5:54
2.	"Perret's Brook"	5:57
3.	"Flutter"	5:32
4.	"Something Old"	5:10
5.	"Marleah's Cadence"	3:59
6.	"Rift"	5:00
7.	"Pinch"	4:28
8.	"Walter Stephen's Only Daughter"	4:34
9.	"Happy Downer"	5:04
10.	"Twin"	4:47
Total length:		48:25

== Personnel ==
- Oliver Wilde – writing, production, recording

== Release history ==
Region	Date	Label	Format	Edition	Ref.
Various	23 June 2013	Howling Owl	LP; digital download	Standard edition	
