= A Factory Sample =

1979 EP by various artists

EP by Various artists
- Released: 24 January 1979
- Recorded: July and October 1978
- Studios: Cargo, Rochdale, England; Western Works, Sheffield, England
- Genres: Post-punk; industrial; comedy
- Length: 27:40
- Label: Factory
- Producers: Martin Zero; Laurie Latham; C.P. Lee; Cabaret Voltaire

Joy Division singles and EPs chronology
An Ideal for Living (1978)	A Factory Sample (1979)	Transmission (1979)

The Durutti Column chronology
A Factory Sample (1978)	The Return of the Durutti Column (1980)

John Dowie chronology
Another Close Shave (1977)	A Factory Sample (1978)	It's Hard to be an Egg (1981)

Cabaret Voltaire chronology
Extended Play (1978)	A Factory Sample (1978)	Baader-Meinhof" / "Sex in Secret (1979)

A Factory Sample is a 7-inch double sampler EP released in January 1979 by Factory Records of Manchester, England. Funded by a small inheritance which had recently been bequeathed to Tony Wilson, it was the first vinyl recording to be released by the label, assigned the catalogue number FAC-2 (FAC 1 was a poster designed by Peter Saville for a concert at The Russell Club). The cover of the EP, designed by Saville, is made of silver glassine, sealed inside a thin plastic bag.

The Joy Division tracks were later re-released on the band's 1988 compilation album Substance.

The Cabaret Voltaire tracks were later re-released on the 1990 double disc rarities compilation Listen Up with Cabaret Voltaire.

== Track listing ==
2x7" vinyl (Factory FAC 2)

Side A (Aside)

1. Joy Division: "Digital" (Curtis, Hook, Morris, Sumner) – 2:50
2. Joy Division: "Glass" (Curtis, Hook, Morris, Sumner) – 3:51
- Vinyl etching: EVERYTHING

Side B (Beside)

1. The Durutti Column: "No Communication" (The Durutti Column) – 4:57
2. The Durutti Column: "Thin Ice (Detail)" (The Durutti Column) – 3:16
- Vinyl etching: IS REPAIRABLE

Side C (Seaside)

1. John Dowie: "Acne" (Dowie) – 1:43
2. John Dowie: "Idiot" (Dowie) – 1:53
3. John Dowie: "Hitler's Liver" (Dowie) – 2:27
- Vinyl etching: EVERYTHING

Side D (Decide)

1. Cabaret Voltaire: "Baader Meinhof" (Cabaret Voltaire) – 3:15
2. Cabaret Voltaire: "Sex in Secret" (Cabaret Voltaire) – 3:28
- Vinyl etching: IS BROKEN

== Credits ==
=== Joy Division ===
- Ian Curtis – lead vocals
- Peter Hook – bass
- Stephen Morris – drums
- Bernard Sumner – guitar

=== The Durutti Column ===
- Colin Sharp – lead vocals
- Vini Reilly – guitar
- Dave Rowbotham – guitar
- Tony Bowers – bass
- Chris Joyce – drums
- Stephen Hopkins – keyboards

=== Cabaret Voltaire ===
- Stephen Mallinder – vocals, bass, keyboards
- Richard H. Kirk – guitars, keyboards, tapes
- Chris Watson – keyboards, tapes
