= Paris Angels =

British rock and dance band (1989–1991)

- Origin: Ashton-under-Lyne, England
- Genres: Alternative rock, alternative dance, Madchester
- Years active: 1987–1992; 2012
- Labels: Sheer Joy Records, Virgin Records, Stereokill Recordings
- Past members: Paul "Wags" Wagstaff; Rikki Turner; Steven Tajti; Scott Carey; Mark Adj; Jayne Gill; Simon Worrall

Paris Angels were an English seven-piece band from Guide Bridge, Ashton-under-Lyne, Greater Manchester, England, associated with the Madchester scene of 1989–1991. Their music fused indie guitars with electronic dance music. The band comprised Paul 'Wags' Wagstaff (later of Black Grape and the reformed Happy Mondays), Rikki Turner, Steven Tajti, Scott Carey, Mark Adj, Jayne Gill and Simon Worrall.

== History ==
The band were regulars of the Boardwalk and Haçienda clubs in Manchester, and as such were heavily influenced by acid house and the nascent Madchester scene of the late 1980s.

The band first signed a recording contract with Sheer Joy Records. There they were introduced to producer Michael Johnson; the product was their most well-known song "Perfume (All on You)", a synthesis of 1960s jangle and disco. It was 'single of the week' in the NME and stayed in the Top 10 of the UK Indie Chart in the summer of 1990. This was closely followed by "Scope" and "I Understand"; the latter of which was the single of the week in the final edition of Sounds.

On the back of their early success, the band signed to Virgin Records and released new single "Fade" and re-released "Perfume" to back up Paris Angels only album, Sundew, to favourable reviews from NME, Vox and Melody Maker. Paris Angels then recorded a session for BBC Radio 1 disc jockey John Peel. "Stay", appeared on the best of the Peel Session's box set, and they had other radio and television sessions. In March 1991, NME reported that Paris Angels were appearing at the 'Great Indie Festival – A Midsummer's Daydream' at Milton Keynes Bowl in June that year. Also, on the bill were 808 State, Gary Clail, New Fast Automatic Daffodils, The Shamen, Shades of Rhythm plus Flowered Up.

Paris Angels recruited long-time collaborator Simon Crompton to produce their next album for Virgin, however with the sale of Virgin to EMI, Paris Angels were removed from its roster. The completed album was never released. They were one of the last bands to leave during this cull along with Public Image Ltd and Definition of Sound.

Left with no recording contract, and with singer Jayne Gill pregnant, the band called it a day.

Wagstaff returned with Black Grape and the Happy Mondays. Rikki Turner played in St. Jack Steven. Taji went on to record with The Rude Club. Bassist Scott Carey recorded with Chelsea-based band The Shave and hosted The Evening Session and Transmission on Manchester radio station 96.2 The Revolution.

Drummer Simon Worrall died on 2 November 2011. Steven Tajti died in February 2024.

In 2013, the band reformed to play live and signed a deal with Stereokill Recordings to finally issue their second album, recorded in 1992. After the deal fell through, the group instead made the album available as a free download on Bandcamp.

Wagstaff died in March 2025.

== Members ==
- Rikki Turner - vocals, percussion, woodwind
- Jayne Gill - vocals, percussion
- Paul "Wags" Wagstaff - guitar (died: 2025)
- Mark Adj - guitar, percussion
- Scott Carey - bass, guitar, harmonica
- Steven Tajti - keyboards, programming, piano, bass (died: 2024)
- Simon Worrall - drums (died: 2011)
- Barrington Stewart - vocals, percussion (live only) (died: 2011)

== Discography ==
=== Albums ===
- Sundew (Virgin Records 1991) – UK #37
- Eclipse (Bandcamp, August 2015)

=== Singles ===
- "Scope" (Sheer Joy 1990) – UK No. 75
- "Perfume" / "All on You" (Sheer Joy 1990) – UK No. 55
- "Oh Yes" (Sheer Joy 1991)
- "Fade" (Virgin Records 1991) – UK No. 70
- "Perfume (Loved Up)" (Virgin Records 1991)
- "Door to Summer" (Bandcamp 2015) – free download
- "Complete Mind" (Bandcamp 2015) – free download
- "Shake" (Bandcamp 2015) – free download

== See also ==
- List of bands from Manchester
- List of bands from England
- List of Peel sessions
