= Stuck in This Ocean =

Studio album by Airship
- Released: 5 September 2011
- Recorded: PIAS Records
- Genre: Indie rock
- Label: PIAS Recordings

Airship chronology
Kids (EP) (2011)	Stuck in This Ocean (2011)

Professional ratings
Review scores
Source	Rating
AllMusic	3/5 stars
Drowned In Sound	5/10 stars
DIY	3.5/5 stars
musicOMH	2/5 stars
Loud and Quiet	7/10 stars
NME	6/10 stars

Stuck in This Ocean is the debut album by the Manchester band Airship, released 5 September 2011 on PIAS Records.

== Track listing ==
1. Algebra
2. Invertebrate
3. Kids
4. Gold Watches
5. Spirit Party
6. The Trial Of Mr Riddle
7. Organ
8. Test
9. Vampires
10. This Is Hell
11. Stuck in This Ocean
