= The Greatest Hit (Money Mountain) =

Studio album by Blue Orchids
- Released: 1982
- Studio: Relentless Studios, Ancoats, Manchester
- Genre: Post-punk; neo-psychedelia
- Label: Rough Trade
- Producer: Blue Orchids, Tony Roberts

Blue Orchids chronology
The Greatest Hit (Money Mountain) (1982)	From Severe to Serene (2002)

The Greatest Hit (Money Mountain) is the debut studio album by English post-punk band Blue Orchids, released in 1982 by Rough Trade Records.

It reached number 5 in the UK Indie Chart.

== Reception ==
Professional ratings
Review scores
Source	Rating
AllMusic	3.5/5 stars
Trouser Press	favourable

Chicago Reader called the album "one of British postpunk's greatest moments".

== Track listing ==
All tracks composed by Martin Bramah, Rick Goldstraw and Una Baines

1. "Sun Connection"
2. "Dumb Magician"
3. "Tighten My Belt"
4. "A Year with No Head"
5. "Hanging Man"
6. "Bad Education"
7. "Wait"
8. "No Looking Back"
9. "Low Profile"
10. "Mad as the Mist and Snow"

== Personnel ==
Blue Orchids

- Martin Bramah - guitar, vocals
- Rick Goldstraw - guitar, bass
- Una Baines - keyboards
- Toby Toman - drums, percussion

with:

- The Super Reals - backing vocals
