= Dogman (children's musical) =

1994 children's musical

Dogman is a 1994 children's musical show by John Dowie with music by Neil Innes directed by Victor Spinetti. A soundtrack album was released in 2005, narrated by Phill Jupitus and again with the songs of Neil Innes.
