= Shirehorses =

UK parody rock band, 1997–2001

- Also known as: The Mighty Horse
- Origin: Manchester, England
- Genres: Comedy rock, parody
- Years active: 1997–2001
- Labels: Warner, Columbia
- Past members: Mark Radcliffe; Marc "Lard" Riley; Chris Lee; Rhys Hughes; Patrick Gallagher AKA Dick Scruttock

The Shirehorses were a spoof band comprising two BBC Radio DJs from Manchester, Mark Radcliffe and Marc Riley, known collectively as Mark and Lard.

As part of their BBC Radio 1 shows, the pair produced pastiches of chart songs, such as "You're Gormless", a parody of Babybird's "You're Gorgeous", "Lardy Boy", a parody of Placebo's "Nancy Boy", and "Why Is It Always Dairylea", spoofing Travis's "Why Does It Always Rain on Me?", using the band names 'Baby Bloke', 'Gazebo' and 'Dave Lee Travisty' respectively. When they rewrote The Seahorses' "Love Is the Law" as "(Now) I Know (Where I'm Going) Our Kid", they chose the stage-name Shirehorses, which they then retained for future recordings and performances. Other parodies include "I Want a Roll with It" (spoofing "Roll with It" by Oasis), "Feel Like Shite" ("Alright" by Supergrass), and "Country Spouse" ("Country House" by Blur).

The band toured extensively, playing many small, university gigs to exploit their popularity with students. However, they also performed at larger venues, supporting Blur on a 1997 UK tour, taking in several stadia, and appearing at Glastonbury Festival in 1997.

Marc Riley was formerly a member of British Manchester band the Fall and later the Creepers before embarking on a radio presentation career alongside Mark Radcliffe. Formerly a double act on BBC Radio 1, in March 2004 they went their separate ways, Radcliffe initially to BBC Radio 2, Riley to BBC Radio 6 Music and later joined at the station by Mark Radcliffe as part of the afternoon Radcliffe and Maconie show.

== Discography ==
The Shirehorses have released two albums to date:

- The Worst...Album in the World...Ever...EVER!, a parody of the long string of compilation albums released in the UK since the 1990s called The Best (genre) Album in the world ever!.
- Our Kid Eh, a play on the name of Radiohead's album, Kid A.
