= Ray Tarantino =

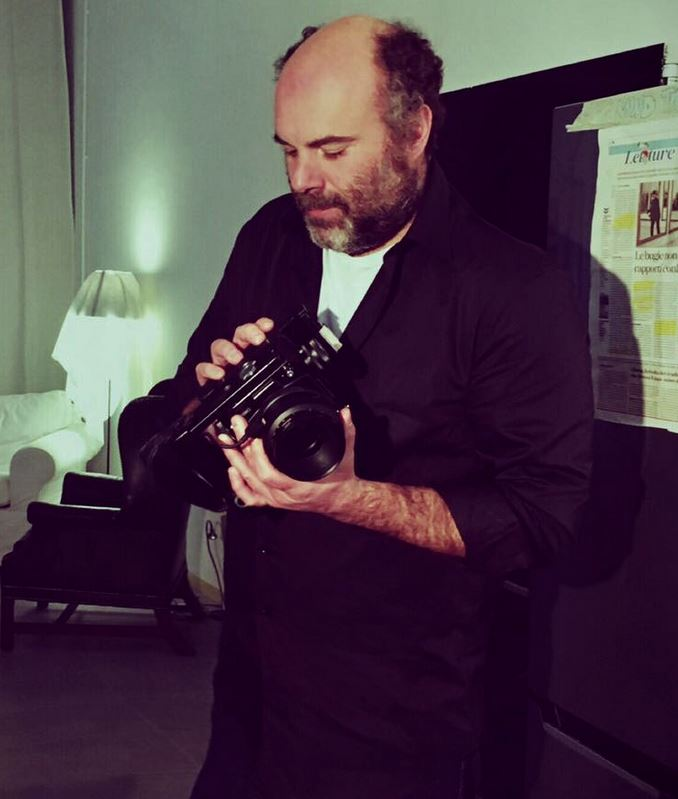
- Photo by Fabio Gargiulo, Milan 2020

Background information
- Born: Aurelio Tarantino; 3 February 1976 (age 50); Milan, Italy
- Occupations: Entrepreneur; author; photographer (formerly); musician (formerly); singer-songwriter (formerly); producer (formerly)
- Website: raytarantino.com

Aurelio "Ray" Tarantino (born 3 February 1976) is an Italian technology entrepreneur, author, as well as a former photographer and touring songwriter. He is the founder of Prismatica Labs and the co-founder and CEO of ForeQuest, an AI-powered augmented reality and advertising technology startup. In 2024, he was listed among La Repubblica's "500 Italians who count in artificial intelligence." As a photographer, his work was published in The New York Times, Rolling Stone, Vanity Fair, Vogue, GQ, The Guardian, Billboard, and the BBC. He is a Grammy Awards voting member (NARAS) and a member of the Nashville Songwriters Association International (NSAI) and the Americana Music Association.

== Early life ==
Aurelio Tarantino was born in the northern Italian city of Milan. He moved to England at the age of 12 to study English at Milton Abbey School in Dorset, where a roommate introduced him to "Tangled Up in Blue" by Bob Dylan. Tarantino was so moved by what he heard that he bought a guitar and began writing songs.

== Publications ==
Tarantino is a co-author of the PROMPT book series, including PROMPT for Startups, a guide to using AI language models for startup development, and PROMPT for Brands and PROMPT for Musicians.

== Technology and entrepreneurship ==
In 2020, Tarantino co-founded ForeQuest, an AI-powered augmented reality startup focused on the mobile advertising sector. The company developed a MadTech platform combining a proprietary AdTech format with an augmented reality environment, and holds two international patents. ForeQuest was selected to represent Italy at Web Summit 2022 in Lisbon through ICE, the Italian Trade Agency. In 2024, La Repubblica listed ForeQuest among 500 notable Italian players in artificial intelligence. Tarantino subsequently founded Prismatica Labs, a consultancy focused on behaviour, marketing, and game theory.

== Photography ==
Tarantino's portrait, editorial, and street photography has been published in The New York Times, Rolling Stone, Vanity Fair, The Guardian, Billboard, the BBC, Maxim, and Sette. His commercial work has appeared in Vogue UK, Germany, Italy, Korea, and Russia, GQ UK, and Tatler. He is the preferred portrait photographer for composer Ludovico Einaudi and musician Luciano Ligabue. His notable subjects also include composer Michael Nyman and fashion designer Romeo Gigli. In 2016, Style magazine (Corriere della Sera) featured twelve of his photographs, highlighting him among Italy's finest street photographers.

== Music career ==
As an adult, Ray Tarantino survived a near-fatal car crash, which he cites as his reason for abandoning the corporate life for the life of a professional musician.

Tarantino co-produced his debut album, "Recusant" with Tony Bowers, co-founder and former bass player of platinum-selling band, Simply Red. "Recusant" was released by Edel AG and the European label, Ponderosa, which has also released solo-albums by former Police drummer Stewart Copeland. A few months after the album's release, Tarantino was propelled to No. 1 unsigned artist from the UK on MySpace topping the charts alongside Amy Winehouse and Gomez. As a result, Ivo Grasso signed him to a recording contract with Massive Arts and a publishing deal with Sony/ATV Music Publishing. He then began solid years of touring across Europe and the US, earning him the media moniker, "Travelling Troubadour." Tarantino's collaborations include composing the music for "Senza Pelle" (lyrics by Giulio Casale), recorded by Italian folk singer Patrizia Laquidara; "My Heart Your Heart," recorded by Delmar Brown on his album "Inner Spirit;" and producing Luca Gemma's third solo album, "Folkadelic."

He has performed on American television and on the Italian television show, "Parla Con Me," famous for its political satire, liberal views and critique of Italian Prime Minister Silvio Berlusconi.

In 2010, he opened for Tori Amos at the Villa Arconati Music Festival. He counts the experience among his career's highlights, along with meeting legendary musician Taj Mahal. Tiny Drum Records released his self-titled second album in 2012 to positive reviews. Tarantino lives in Nashville, where he records for Tiny Drum Records. Steve Werbelow co-produced Tarantino's third album, "Good Things Will Happen," to be released in 2014. The album includes collaboration with Steve O'Brien, co-writer of the No. 2 Billboard Country Single, "Rock My World (Little Country Girl)," and Jim Reilley, co-founder of The New Dylans.

Reviewers compare Tarantino's lyrical style to Bob Dylan and his musical integrity to Bruce Springsteen.

== Discography ==
- Recusant (2007)
- Aimlessly – Tour Only Edition (2009)
- Ray Tarantino (2012)
- Hands Down – Single (2012)
- Good Things Will Happen (2014)
