= Mangled After Dinner =

- Also known as: M.A.D., Those From The Grave
- Origin: England
- Genres: Gothic rock
- Years active: 1981–1988
- Past members: Trevor "Poeraver" Chadwick; Henry Lansford; Frederick "Fred" Ritchen; John "Johnny" Lansford

Mangled After Dinner was an English gothic rock band founded in 1981 in Manchester, England. Mangled After Dinner reached a small but loyal community of fans and played an overly gloomy sound, using synthesizer effects and well-written lyrics of exceptionally romantic poetry. Their major themes included: rainstorms, dark forests, abandoned castles, English folklore and the pursuit of answers through solitude and disbelievement.

== Members ==
The band was formed by:

- Trevor "Poeraver" Chadwick - vocals (1959–1989)
- Henry Lansford - guitar (born 1961)
- Frederick "Fred" Ritchen - bass (born 1961)
- John "Johnny" Lansford - drums (born 1957)

Their first success was Mangled After Dinner Ritual, recorded in long play with eight total tracks and a stylized black cover with a designed skull with a lit candle abovehead. The band disbanded in the late 1980s, when Chadwick died in a car crash near London in October 1989.

== Discography ==
- Mangled After Dinner Ritual (1981)
- The Symphony of the Mangled One (1983)
- Darkened Club Symphony (1984)
- Hits from the Grave - M.A.D. Collection (1986)
- The Hanging Man (1988)

== Bootlegs ==
- Voices Far Beyond (1991), collection of recorded but never released demo, outtakes and general discarded musics. Rough sound with lo-fi recording.
- Tribute to Chadwick (1993), lo-fi recording in a very rare album where lesser known bands plays six tracks of the MAD official discography. Back cover depicts the band, in a photo taken in one of their live shows.
