= Dirty North =

British rap, reggae and rock band

- Origin: Wythenshawe, Manchester, England
- Genres: Rap; Reggae; Rock
- Years active: 2008–present
- Label: Corporate Records
- Members: Johnny Gregory; Dave Cookson; Carl Palmer; Liam Johnson (2013–2015); Andy Burney (2007-2008); Rick Gregory (2007-2008)

Dirty North are a three-piece band from Wythenshawe, Manchester, England, comprising rap, reggae and rock influences amongst others. Forming in 2008, their style is often referred to by the band as "Wythenshawe Dub".

In March 2012, the band were confirmed to be one of the supporting acts at one of The Stone Roses' 2012 summer reunion concerts at Manchester's Heaton Park, playing to an audience of 75,000. The Stone Roses' Reni had said in an earlier press conference when asked about the current state of the music industry, "Dirty North from Wythenshawe, they're great."

In August 2013, the band released their debut album, Down In The Game, as a pay-what-you-like download through Corporate Records.

== Discography ==
- "Mixtape 2008" (2008)
- "Mixtape 2 09" (2009)
- "Know What I Think" (2010)
- Down In The Game (2013)
- "Freestyle EP" (2014)
- "Wythenshawe Dub" (2015)
