= Distant Cousins =

English band from Manchester

Distant Cousins were an English band from Manchester. They are grouped within the Madchester scene, though the music was a blend of soul and pop. The group consisted of Doreen Edwards (vocals), Neil Fitzpatrick (ex-Smirks, guitar/sax), and "Snuff" (ex-Motivation, drums/percussion). Edwards and Fitzpatrick wrote most of the band's songs.

Simon Milner (vocals/piano) and Ian "Mog" Morris (bass), both also from The Smirks, performed as auxiliary members of the group in the studio. Milner also wrote one song on each of the group's two albums, as well as a non-LP B-side.

They were originally signed to independent label Ghetto Records for whom they recorded their first album. A re-recording of one of the album tracks "You Used To" became their first single in December 1989; it peaked at number 77 on the UK Singles Chart in January 1990. The band were subsequently signed to Virgin Records, but had no more chart hits and broke up after the release of their second album, 1992's Warm Hatred.

== Discography ==
=== Albums ===
- Distant Cousins (1989)
- Warm Hatred (1992)

=== Singles ===
- "You Used To" (1989), UK number 77
- "Boo Hoo Hoo" (1990)
- "You Used To '92" (1992)
- "My Brother" (1992)
