= Una Baines =

- Born: April 1957 (age 69); Manchester, Lancashire, England
- Genres: Post-punk; new wave
- Occupation: Keyboardist
- Instrument: Keyboard
- Years active: 1977–present
- Formerly of: The Fall, the Fates

Una Baines (born April 1957) is best known as the keyboard player in the first line-up of British post-punk/new wave band the Fall. Her feminist viewpoint helped shape the band's early political stance and she was one of the very few Fall members, other than frontman Mark E. Smith, who contributed lyrics to the group’s songs.

== Career ==
Baines grew up in the Collyhurst district of Manchester. Her mother was Irish, her father was British (Mancunian). She met Smith at college, but both left after finding studying financially difficult. After a stint working as an office clerk, Baines began training as a psychiatric nurse. She rented a flat on Kingswood Road in Prestwich, which became a meeting place for the four friends (Baines, Smith, Martin Bramah and Tony Friel) who would go on to form the band, inspired by seeing the Sex Pistols play in Manchester.

Baines was originally going to be the drummer in the group but realised that she would be unlikely to be able to afford a drum kit. Instead, she started saving up for a keyboard. Baines did not play at the band's first gig on 23 May 1977, as she had applied for a bank loan to enable her to buy a keyboard, and it had not arrived in time. She made her debut at the Fall's second gig, on 3 June 1977, in Manchester. Apparently, she played the National Anthem on her keyboard (a cheap model called the "Snoopy") at one point during the set, although no recordings of the gig exist.

Two songs from the band's 2 October 1977 appearance at Manchester's Electric Circus venue were recorded, and released on the 10-inch LP Short Circuit: Live at the Electric Circus with the remainder of the set on master tape being stored in Virgin's archive. Baines also played on the band's first recording session, on 9 November 1977 at Indigo Studios in Manchester. Three of the songs were later released as the band's first single, "Bingo-Master's Break-Out!" in August 1978 – after Baines had left the band. The fourth song recorded in this session was "Frightened" which was re-recorded for Live At The Witch Trials; however, this early version has never been released and is believed to be lost.

Baines left the Fall in March 1978, having played a little over 20 gigs with the group. She went on to form Blue Orchids with Martin Bramah, when he quit the Fall in 1979. Blue Orchids released their first single in 1980 and their first album, The Greatest Hit (Money Mountain), in 1982. After a brief stint as Nico's backing band on a European tour, they split in 1982, briefly reforming in 1985. Baines then formed a predominantly female band called the Fates, who released the album Furia on Baines' own Taboo label in late 1985.

In 2002, an article revealed that Baines was working at a community centre in Whalley Range, South Manchester, where she was in the process of setting up a female musicians' collective. More recently, she was interviewed on the 2005 BBC TV documentary The Fall: The Wonderful and Frightening World of Mark E Smith.

In 2015 Baines worked with Australian comic book artist Keith McDougall (artist) to produce I'll Be Your Mirror, a graphic memoir with the first issue focusing on her teenage relationship with Mark E. Smith.

In 2016 Una continues to work in music with a predominantly female 8-piece group called Poppycock, for which she writes the songs, plays keyboards and occasional guitar and vocal.

== See also ==
- List of The Fall members

== Sources ==
- Ford, Simon (May 2002). "Primal Scenes". The Wire. 219. The Wire, London: 28–33. ISSN 0952-0686.
- The Fall biography at The Fall's website
