= In and Out of Fashion =

EP by The Teardrops
- Released: 1978
- Recorded: 29 August 1978
- Genre: New wave
- Label: Bent

The Teardrops chronology
In and Out of Fashion (1978)	Leave Me No Choice (1978)

In and Out of Fashion is the debut recording and the first EP and 12" single of new wave band the Teardrops, released by Bent Records, in 1978. The band was formed by then Buzzcocks bass guitarist Steve Garvey, among others. Shortly after the release of the EP, Karl Burns and Tony Friel, both from the Fall joined the band, until their disbanding in 1981.

The next EP, Leave Me No Choice, had the same tracks, but probably re-recorded, because the line-up was composed by Garvey and newcomers Tony Friel and Karl Burns.

== Track listing ==
1. "Leave Me No Choice"
2. "Pompous"
3. "Teenage Vice"
4. "Blueser Blue"

== Personnel ==
- Trevor Wain: vocals, guitar
- John Key: vocals, guitar
- Dave Brisbane: guitar
- Steve Garvey: vocals, bass
- Jimmy Donelly: vocals, drums
