= Dave Rowbotham =

British musician (1958–1991)

- Also known as: David Rowbotham; Cowboy Dave (posthumously)
- Born: 1958; Didsbury, Manchester, England
- Died: 8 November 1991 (aged 33) Burnage, Manchester, England
- Genres: Punk rock, post-punk, new wave, alternative rock
- Occupation: Musician
- Instruments: Guitar, bass guitar
- Years active: 1977–1991
- Label: Factory Records

Dave Rowbotham (1958 – 8 November 1991) was an English rock musician who played guitar and bass with various Manchester bands in the 1970s and the 1980s, and as a studio musician.

== Biography ==
Born in Didsbury, Manchester, he went to school at Elm Grove Primary School and then Parrswood High School. He left school to train as an electrician and in 1970 he started playing rhythm guitar with his pals in a four piece rock cover band called Flashback. He later adopted the hippie lifestyle. During the punk era, he, alongside drummer Chris Joyce, played in a band called Fast Breeder and was managed by Alan Erasmus, who later co-founded Factory Records with Tony Wilson. In 1978, the pair, alongside Alberto Y Lost Trios Paranoias bassist Tony Bowers, singer Phil Rainford (replaced after months by Colin Sharp), and former Nosebleeds guitarist Vini Reilly, founded the post-punk band The Durutti Column.

However, the five-piece line-up did not last long, and after releasing A Factory Sample, a compilation by various artists which contained two of their songs, Rowbotham, alongside Sharp, Bowers, and Joyce, left Reilly. Rowbotham and the latter two formed The Mothmen. During the early days of The Mothmen, he also re-joined Reilly in Pauline Murray and the Invisible Girls, with then ex-Penetration vocalist Pauline Murray, playing on their eponymous album. With The Mothmen, he released two albums, Pay Attention (On-U Sound, 1981) and One Black Dot (1982). By this time, he had also formed Motivation, along with ex-Buzzcocks bassist Steve Garvey.

By 1981 or early 1982, shortly before the release of One Black Dot, he left The Mothmen. After that and Motivation, he played on sessions for Factory Records.

On 2 November 1991, Rowbotham's girlfriend found him dead in his flat on Grangethorpe Drive in Burnage. He was lying on the living room floor in a pool of blood, and had been murdered with a plasterer's hammer. No one has yet been convicted of his murder.

In his memory, the Madchester band Happy Mondays wrote a song called "Cowboy Dave", released on the album Yes Please!, in 1992.

The film Cowboy Dave, about Rowbotham's life, won a BAFTA in 2018.
