= Airship (band) =

British indie rock band

- Origin: Manchester, England
- Genre: Alternative rock
- Years active: 2004–2011
- Members: Elliott Williams, Steven Griffiths, Tom Dyball, Marcus Wheeldon

Airship is a British indie rock band, which in 2004 in Manchester was founded with the name of Astroboy. The band consists of singer-guitarist Elliott Williams, guitarist Steven Griffiths, bassist Tom Dyball and guitarist Marcus Wheeldon. After they had encountered a period called Rowley, they decided to change their name again to make a fresh start. The music of Airship is often compared to that of Snow Patrol, Editors and White Lies.

Airship issued two EPs, "Algebra" (2010) and "Kids" (2011). Their debut album, Stuck in This Ocean, was released in September 2011. It was produced by Dan Austin and Chris Urbanowicz.

== Discography ==
- "Algebra" (2010)
- "Kids" (2011)
- Stuck in This Ocean (2011)
