= Tony Bowers =

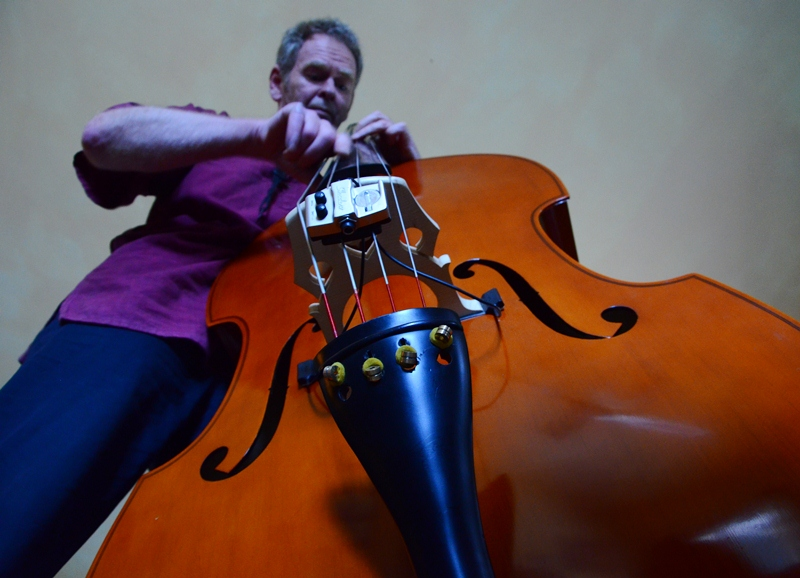

Background information
- Born: 31 October 1952 (age 73); Culcheth, England
- Genres: Alternative rock; soul; blues rock; new wave; dub; free jazz; worldbeat
- Occupations: Musician, record producer, tutor
- Instruments: Guitar, bass, upright bass, bansuri, percussion, saxophone
- Years active: 1972–present
- Labels: Transatlantic Factory Records, Stiff, Rabid, ONUSound, Elektra, WEA, CGD, Ponderosa

Tony Bowers (born 31 October 1952) is an English musician based in Italy and Ireland who has worked with many bands, including Simply Red in the 1980s.

== Career ==
Bowers debuted in the blues band, Blind Eye (1971–1972), as second guitarist, although he is not considered a former member. After playing in other blues bands, he joined Alberto Y Lost Trios Paranoias, with whom he played bass on every released album and single. Later, in 1978, he formed The Durutti Column, alongside guitarists Vini Reilly and Dave Rowbotham, and drummer Chris Joyce. After some gigs and the release of two songs on a various artists compilation called A Factory Sample, Bowers, Rowbotham, and Joyce left the band, forming The Mothmen with ex-Alberto Y Lost Trios Paranoias member Bob Harding.

After Simply Red (1991) he collaborated with Barrington Stewart (DFreek), who, with Demo Morselli (an Italian trumpet player), formed Concrete Wig (the name dedicated to the late Roger Eagle, who was a major influence).

Barrington died in 2011. Bowers continues to play, write, collaborate and produce, including co-producing Ray Tarantino's debut album, Recusant. which propelled Tarantino to No. 1 unsigned artist from the UK on Myspace, topping the charts alongside Amy Winehouse and Gomez.

Bowers played on and produced Who Stole The Sky in 2003 by Sainkho Namtchylak, an album that was in the top three on BBC world music charts. He now lives in both Italy and Ireland, participating in various different projects, including tutoring, recording, and live performances with different artists including Blues Confidential, Fabio Fabbri, and Sorgente.
