= Alberto y Lost Trios Paranoias =

British comedy rock band

- Origin: Manchester, England
- Genres: Comedy, rock, punk
- Years active: 1973–1982
- Labels: Stiff, Transatlantic, Logo, Overground Records
- Spinoffs: The Durutti Column, The Mothmen, Simply Red
- Spinoff of: Greasy Bear
- Past members: Chris "C.P." Lee; Bruce Mitchell; Jimmy Hibbert; Bob Harding; Simon White; Tony Bowers; Ray "Mighty Mongo" Hughes; Les Prior

Alberto y Lost Trios Paranoias were an English comedy rock band, formed in Manchester, England in 1973. Their story is told in CP Lee's book When We Were Thin (published 2007 by Hotun Press). The name of the band is a corruption of the Paraguayan band Alberto y Los Trios Paraguayos.

== Career ==
Created in 1972 by former member of Greasy Bear, Chris "C.P." Lee, with Jimmy Hibbert (vocals, bass) (ex Jacko Ogg and the Head People) and Bob Harding (vocals, guitar, bass), the comedy sketch outfit became a musical group in 1974 and was joined by former Greasy Bear (1968–1972) drummer Bruce Mitchell (drums), with Les Prior (vocals), Simon White (steel guitar, guitar), Tony Bowers (bass, guitar) and Ray "Mighty Mongo" Hughes (second drummer). They became a popular support act, supporting Hawkwind on their 1974 tour. The group mercilessly parodied the major rock names of the 1970s – "Anadin" (the trade name for an over-the-counter headache remedy) was a reworking of Lou Reed's "Heroin" / "Sweet Jane". By 1975 they were topping the bill in their own right and were supported by such acts as The Police, The Stranglers, Devo, Ian Dury and the Blockheads, The Clash, The Cure, Joy Division, Robyn Hitchcock, Split Enz, Dr. Feelgood, Buzzcocks, John Dowie, The Smirks, Steve Gibbons Band, Gonzalez, Dr. Hook, The Slits, Richard Hell and the Voidoids, The Dictators, The Jam, Siouxsie and the Banshees, Tonight and Blondie. As with many comedy ensembles, the Albertos belied their comic aspirations by their exemplary musicianship, and they released three albums and a variety of spoof discs, culminating in the musical play, Snuff Rock.

Sleak (aka Snuff Rock), inspired by the then recent film, Snuff, and the concept of snuff movies, but carrying the idea to a band who killed themselves for entertainment, was their musical play presented at London's Royal Court Theatre and Round House and was famous for the role of the comic disc jockey played by Les Prior. The accompanying EP, "Snuff Rock", released on Stiff Records, poked fun at the punk rock phenomenon, targeting the Sex Pistols ("Gobbing on Life"), The Damned ("Kill") and The Clash ("Snuffin' Like That") as well as myriad reggae bands in "Snuffin' In A Babylon". They reached the UK Singles Chart with the Status Quo spoof, "Heads Down No Nonsense Mindless Boogie" in 1978. Les Prior died in January 1980 from leukaemia, which left a large gap in the group.

After their nationally networked TV show Teach Yourself Gibberish, and a crack at America with Sleak, the Albertos disbanded in 1982.

The band's brand of spoof rock has been said to be in the same English tradition as that of the Barron Knights and the Bonzo Dog Doo-Dah Band, but a better comparison might be the American bluegrass/country parody band the Austin Lounge Lizards, whom C.P. Lee described as their "American doppelgängers".

== Discography ==
=== Albums ===
- Alberto Y Lost Trios Paranoias – Transatlantic Records, 1976
- Italians From Outer Space – Transatlantic Records, 1977
- Skite – Logo Records, 1978
- TV Sweat – Fiction Records, 1981 (Credited as 'CP Lee and Alberto Y Los Trios Paranoias')

=== Compilation albums ===
- The Worst of the Berts – Logo, 1980
- Snuff Rock – the Best of the Albertos – Mau Mau, 1991
- Radio Sweat – Overground Records, 1996
- Mandrax Sunset Variations – Castle Records, 2001

=== Singles ===
- "Dread Jaws"/"De Version"* (1976) Transatlantic
- Snuff Rock EP – "Kill", "Gobbing on Life", "Snuffin' Like That", "Snuffin' In A Babylon" (1977) Stiff
- "Old Trust"/"Neville"/"Teenager in Shtuck" (1977) Logo
- "Heads Down No Nonsense Mindless Boogie"/"Thank You"/F*** You"*/"Dead Meat Part II"* (1978) Logo (UK #47)
- "F**k You"*/"Dead Meat Part II"* (1978) Logo
- "Juan Lopez"/"Teenage Paradise"/"Dead Meat part III"* (1978) Logo
- "Cruisin' With Santa"*/"Eye and Eye"* (1982) New Hormones

(* Non-album tracks)
