= Mark Radcliffe (radio broadcaster) =

British DJ (born 1958)

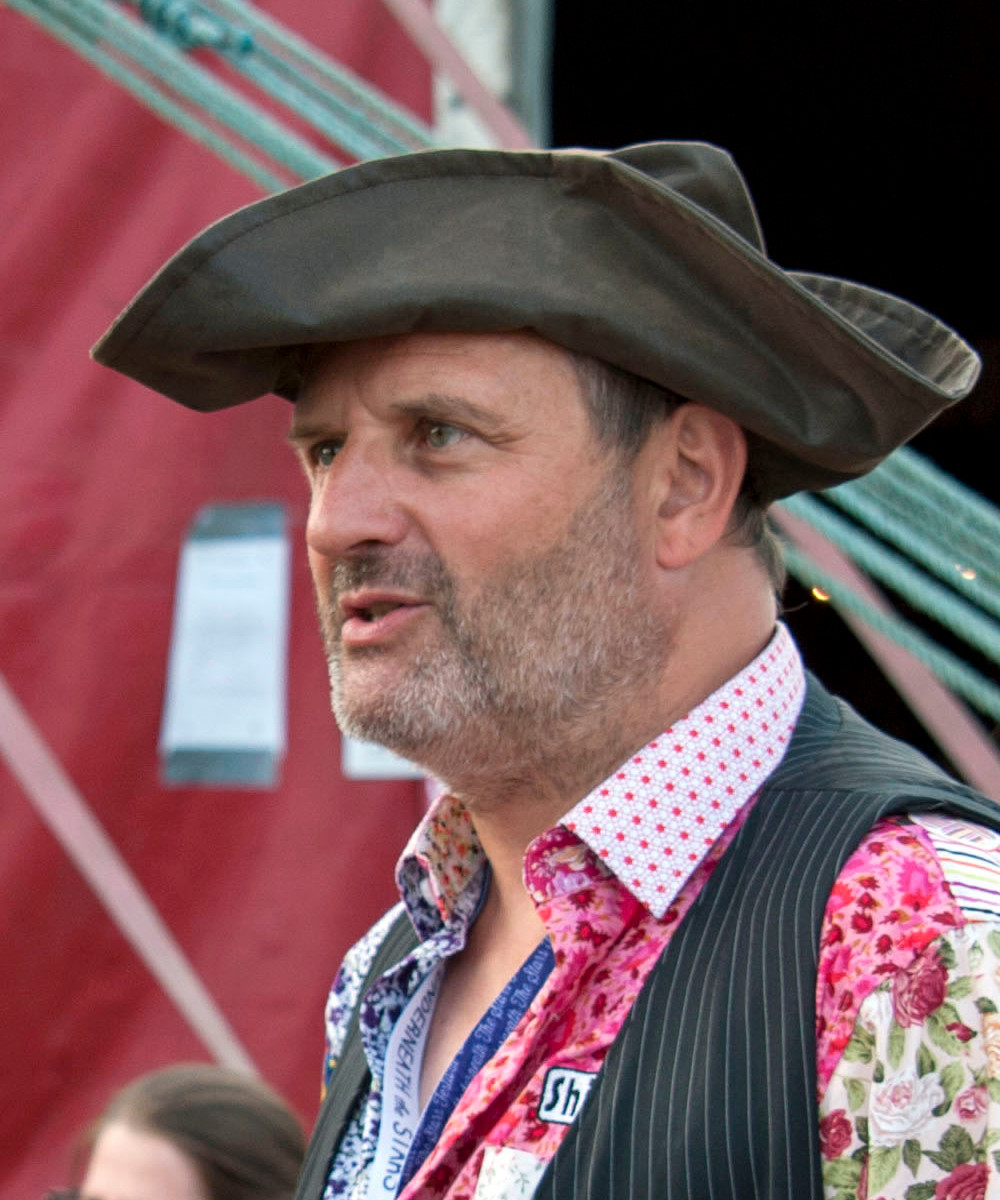
- Radcliffe at the Under the Stars festival in 2014
- Born: 29 June 1958 (age 68); Bolton, Lancashire, England
- Spouse: Bella Sharp (m. 1997)
- Children: 3
- Presenting career
- Show: The Folk Show & Radcliffe & Maconie
- Stations: BBC Radio 2 and BBC Radio 6 Music
- Time slot: Weds 9–10pm and Sat–Sun 8–10am
- Country: United Kingdom

Mark Radcliffe (born 29 June 1958) is an English radio broadcaster, musician and writer. He is best known for his broadcasting work for the BBC, for which he has worked in various roles since the 1980s.

Radcliffe began his broadcasting career in local commercial radio in Manchester before a move to the national station BBC Radio 5, where he met and formed a partnership with Marc Riley, a former guitarist with the Fall. In 1991 he moved to BBC Radio 1, closely followed by Riley with whom, under the moniker Mark and Lard, he worked for 11 years on the station. The pair's stint on Radio 1 included a brief and opinion-dividing spell on the flagship Radio 1 Breakfast and a subsequent afternoon slot show that garnered three Sony Radio Academy Awards.

When the Mark and Lard duo left BBC Radio 1 in 2004, Radcliffe joined BBC Radio 2 and has also presented various TV shows for the BBC, including its coverage of the Glastonbury Festival. He remains a presenter on BBC Radio 2, where he presents the weekly programme The Folk Show. On BBC Radio 6 Music, he co-hosts the weekend breakfast show with Stuart Maconie; they previously co-presented the weekday afternoon show on the same channel, and before that the evening show on Radio 2.

== Early life ==
His father Philip (1932–2018) joined the BBC in Manchester as a news assistant from 2 December 1963, aged 31. By 1967, Philip was the producer of Look North in Manchester. He later worked in the press office of the University of Manchester from 1970 until 1996. He spoke Russian, and worked with the Great Britain–Russia Society, and later lived in Derbyshire.

Radcliffe was born in Bolton, Lancashire, and educated at Bolton School and the University of Manchester, where he studied English, American Studies and Classical Civilisation. He stayed at the traditional all-male Woolton Hall, Manchester of the university at the Fallowfield Campus.

He took an interest in music from a young age, playing drums in numerous bands while at school and university and into his working life.

== Personal life ==
Radcliffe married Bella Sharp on Saturday 19 April 1997 in Cheshire; his 27 year old wife, from Hampshire, was an assistant at Granada TV.

In 1995 Radcliffe lived in Heaton Mersey.

As of 2007, Radcliffe has lived in Knutsford, Cheshire; with three daughters (one from his first marriage), and became a grandfather in October 2008. In July 2011, he was awarded an honorary Doctorate of Letters from the University of Bolton. On 3 October 2018, he announced on his BBC Radio 2 show that he had "cancerous tongue and lymph node issues" and he would take a break from his radio broadcasting for a while. Radcliffe returned to the show on 13 February 2019, though subsequently had pancreatic cancer.

In 2020, Radcliffe was presented with a Knutsford Civic Award by the Mayor of Knutsford for his work curating events as part of the town's music festival.

== Radio and music ==
During his student years, Radcliffe was a member of a number of bands, including a short stint as the drummer for the band Skrewdriver which he left before their later transformation into a white power group.

His first job was assistant producer at Piccadilly Radio in 1979, producing documentaries, classical music and drama.

Radcliffe's radio presenting career began in late 1982 at Piccadilly Radio, where he hosted a Friday night show called Cures For Insomnia. He later hosted Transmission, an eclectic show playing local and nationally recognised new wave and post-punk bands as well as European avant-garde and electronic music.

=== Radio 5 career ===
Radcliffe came to prominence as a DJ on BBC Radio 5's Hit the North from 28 August 1990, but also appeared on other shows such as Cult Radio. Nearly twenty years later, in 2009, he briefly stood in as a presenter on BBC Radio 5 Live, the station that replaced it, to cover Simon Mayo's afternoon show.

=== BBC Radio 1 ===
Radcliffe's BBC Radio 1 career began in 1983 when he produced sessions at Maida Vale Studios for John Peel's show, and was the head of live music. He moved back to Piccadilly Radio in 1985 as head of music. He moved back to the BBC, producing arts shows for Radio 2, and Radio 5's 5 A Side; as a producer he was the first to put Caroline Aherne on national radio as Mrs Merton.

Radio 1 had heard his programme on the former Radio 5, and offered him two weeks when Mark Goodier was off, and afterwards Radio 1 offered him a weekly one-hour show on Mondays. In 1991, he started presenting the one-hour Monday evening show Out on Blue Six.

In early 1993 he hosted the arts programme The Guest List on Thursdays.

Also in 1993, Radcliffe presented Skyman, a show that he presented in character as a visiting alien, and all the records played were space-related. This half-hour show aired immediately before Out on Blue Six on Monday evenings.

He notably took over from Nicky Campbell on 28 October 1993. This was part of the act Mark and Lard (with Marc "The Boy Lard" Riley) on Radio 1. The duo began in a 10 pm – midnight slot, the graveyard shift, on Mondays to Thursdays.

Mark and Lard hosted a show with significant variety, incorporating poetry readings from regular guest Ian McMillan, irreverent comedy, bizarre quizzes like "Fish or Fowl", "Bird or Bloke", "Bard or Blake", and a playlist that rivalled John Peel in eclecticism. The show also held sessions from up and coming and alternative bands of the time, including Throwing Muses, Moloko, Nick Cave, Pulp, Cardiacs, The Bluetones, Babybird, The Divine Comedy, Placebo and Mice. Radcliffe is also credited with the success of White Town's "Your Woman" in January 1997.

Following Chris Evans' sudden departure from Radio 1 in early 1997, Radcliffe and Riley were moved to a brief and unsuccessful position on the breakfast show. Their style of music and broadcasting was not a success in this slot, which catered for a more mainstream audience, and they were soon moved into the early afternoon slot where they resided for the next seven years. This show was a success and saw them win three Sony Gold awards for Best Daily Music Show.

=== BBC Radio 2 and BBC Radio 6 Music ===
Radcliffe left Radio 1 in March 2004 and moved to BBC Radio 2 in June of the same year, with Riley moving to BBC Radio 6 Music. The new show was reminiscent of the graveyard slot he had previously occupied on BBC Radio 1; with live music and studio guests and ran between 10:30 pm and midnight. Radcliffe scooped a major interview with Kate Bush in late 2005, her first in several years. Radcliffe also won a Sony award for this show.

Starting on 16 April 2007, Radcliffe joined with Stuart Maconie to present a new show on BBC Radio 2 on Mondays to Thursdays from 8 pm to 10 pm, which won a Sony award for best Radio show of 2009. From April 2010, the show was reduced to three nights a week, Mondays to Wednesdays.

For a time, he was a frequent stand-in in partnership with Emma Forbes or Liza Tarbuck during the 2–5 pm slot when Steve Wright was away on holiday, and also stood in for Simon Mayo on BBC Radio 5 Live on a few occasions.

In 2009, Radcliffe reunited with Marc Riley to make a series of radio adverts for Manchester City F.C. that were broadcast in North West England.

In spring 2011, his show with Maconie moved to BBC Radio 6 Music, in the weekday afternoon slot. Radcliffe also presented his own weekly solo show on BBC Radio 2, called Mark Radcliffe's Music Club, and in 2013 he took over the presentation of BBC Radio 2's weekly folk programme from Mike Harding. His weekday afternoon show with Maconie was moved on 21 December 2018 to the weekends while he was undergoing treatment for cancer. Maconie had broadcast solo while Radcliffe was away for treatment, but Radcliffe joined Maconie for the last hour of the weekday show. He rang in at home on the first weekend breakfast show on 12 January 2019, and then he rejoined Maconie on a permanent basis from 2 February 2019 and Radcliffe also rejoined to BBC Radio 2 on 13 February 2019.

=== Band member ===
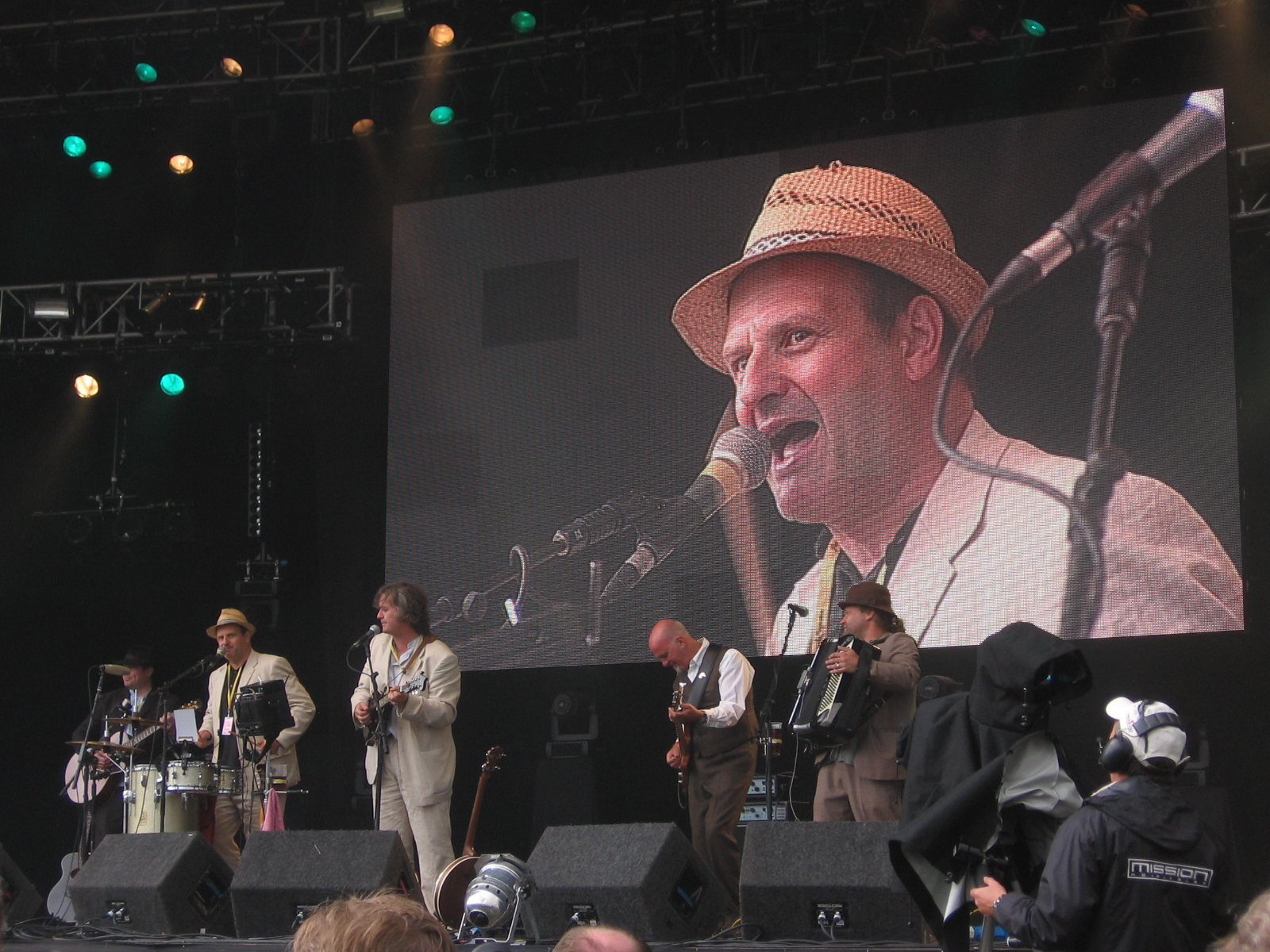
Radcliffe as DJ Mahone at the Cropredy music festival 2008

Radcliffe experienced brief commercial success with Shirehorses, a parody band (its name based on the short-lived band The Seahorses) spawned from his Mark and Lard antics. Earlier in his career, he had played in other bands, including the band Skrewdriver. Radcliffe has written about his part in this band in his book Showbusiness. As of 2007, Radcliffe was a member of the more folk-orientated The Family Mahone which evolved into the group Mark Radcliffe & Foes. He also fronted the Dr. Feelgood tribute band Mark Radcliffe & the Big Figures and the pirate-themed band Galleon Blast. Radcliffe is also co-writer and performer in an avant-garde electronic duo UNE with Paul Langley and performs percussion and backing vocals with the band Fine Lines, who supported Kiefer Sutherland on his 2022 UK tour. Since 2023 Mark has also been performing in a duo with singer/songwriter David Boardman.Their debut album 'First Light' was released in February 2024.

=== Folk at the Theatre ===
Since 2018, Radcliffe has curated Folk at the Theatre as part of the Knutsford Music Festival bringing internationally acclaimed musicians including many of those he has featured on the Folk Show, to the Cheshire town. The events were named for being hosted at the town's Little Theatre and later expanded to be hosted in the larger local church as well.

== Television ==
Radcliffe presented a live music TV programme, The White Room, for four series on Channel 4 from 11 June 1994 to 23 August 1996, and has regularly appeared in both Channel 4 and the BBC's coverage of the Glastonbury Festival, as well as the latter's broadcasts from the Cambridge Folk Festival. He made a guest appearance as himself in CITV show Children's Ward in 1997.

On Thursday 10 July 1997, he presented a 15-week series entitled 'Schools Challenge' on Granada, for schools in the Manchester area, with a set like University Challenge. He was a huge fan of University Challenge in the 1970s.

Along with Marc Riley, he presented a music-based quiz programme, Pop Upstairs Downstairs, for the BBC/Flextech digital TV channel UK Play in 1999 and 2000. He also presented the BBC One football retrospective show Match of the Nineties, which aired in summer 1999. In 2006, he won the ITV singing competition Stars in Their Eyes with an appearance portraying The Pogues front-man Shane MacGowan singing "The Irish Rover". In 2009, he took over from Steve Wright as the presenter of Top of the Pops 2. He presented the BBC Four documentary The Richest Songs in the World, which counted down the 10 most successful songs of all time in terms of money earned.

The Shirehorses were due to appear in an episode of the sitcom Phoenix Nights as the folk band Half a Shilling, but had concerns about the potentially racist content of the part they were to play. They were replaced at the last minute by Tim Healy.

In 2014, Radcliffe was the narrator of BBC One's Call the Council.

In 2021, he presented Live from the Edge, a 13-part music series shown on Showcase TV (Sky channel 191) from Edge Recording Studio, with performances by bands like The Sherlocks, Sea Fever and The Lottery Winners. Radcliffe was also one of a number of music experts hired by Viacom International Studios UK, to comment on the best selling chart hits of the 1980s and 1990s, for a number of Friday night music countdowns on Channel 5 (with the shows being known under various titles such as Greatest Hits of the 80s, or Britain's Biggest 90s Hits).

== Writing ==
Radcliffe wrote the autobiographical Showbusiness: The Diary of a Rock 'N' Roll Nobody (1999); a history of his attempts at a career as a musician, including his exploits with Shirehorses. His novel Northern Sky, based around a folk music club in an imaginary Northern English city, was published in 2005. A book of anecdotes about his life and career, Thank You For the Days was published in 2009. Another memoir, Reelin' in the Years, was published in 2011. Crossroads: In Search of the Moments that Changed Music, a "personal journey" through music history, was published in September 2019.

== Producing ==
Radcliffe started his BBC Radio career in 1983, where he worked as a producer, producing sessions for John Peel featuring artists such as Billy Bragg.

Radcliffe was a producer of Count Arthur Strong's Radio Show! for BBC Radio 4 from series 1 to series 6.
