= Tonight (band) =

English new wave band

Tonight were an English five piece new wave band, from Southend-on-Sea, Essex, England. They were active from June 1977 to January 1979 and had a hit single, "Drummer Man", in February 1978.

== Career ==
Tonight along with The Rich Kids, were the first acts to be described as power pop, a new UK music genre term in 1978, initially mentioned by Charles Catchpole, in the Evening Standard, 'Rock Notes' section, on 17 January 1978. Tonight scored the first hit for the power pop movement in February 1978, with "Drummer Man" reaching No. 14 in the UK Singles Chart. Their next single "Money (That's Your Problem)" charted reached No. 66; but two more singles were released plus an album was recorded.

Lack of further successes leaves them labelled as a one-hit wonder. The previously un-released Tonight album, Drummerman, was finally released in 2010, on Angel Air Records. The original album was shelved by WEA in 1978.

== Personnel ==
- Chris Turner - lead vocals and songwriter
- Phil Chambon - rhythm guitar, backing vocals and songwriter
- Dave Cook - lead guitar
- Russ Strothard - bass guitar and backing vocals
- Gary Thompson - drums
- Andy Arthurs - producer and songwriter
