= Out on Blue Six (show) =

- Running time: 60 minutes
- Country of origin: United Kingdom
- Language: English
- Home station: BBC Radio 1
- Hosted by: Mark Radcliffe
- Original release: 8 April 1991 – 18 October 1993
- Audio format: Stereo

Out on Blue Six is a weekly hour-long radio show broadcast by BBC Radio 1 on Monday evenings between 1991 and 1993 and presented by Mark Radcliffe.

The music played on the show was mostly garage, psychedelia or punk. The show received a Sony Award in 1992 for Best Specialist Music Programme.
