= Sundew (album) =

Studio album by Paris Angels
- Released: 1991
- Recorded: June 1990–March 1991
- Studios: The Windings, North Wales; Suite 16 Studios, Rochdale; York
- Genres: Madchester; baggy; electronic; dance-pop
- Length: 48:10
- Label: Virgin
- Producer: Michael Johnson

Paris Angels chronology
Sundew (1991)	Eclipse (2015)

Singles from Sundew
- 1. "Perfume (All on You)" Released: 1990; 2. "I Understand" Released: 1991; 3. "Fade" Released: 1991

Sundew is the debut album by Mancunian band Paris Angels, released by Virgin Records in 1991. Following the group's arrival onto the British music scene during the popularity of Madchester, the album features the group's unique take on Madchester and baggy, combining Northern indie music with electronic instrumentation, techno and dance-pop. The album's cross-influenced sound is a result of each of the seven members of the band bringing their own influences. Much of the record, which was produced by Michael Johnson, was recorded near Wrexham, North Wales.

Despite lacking a hit single, the album reached number 37 on the UK Albums Chart, although general public indifference was a result of the Madchester scene losing popularity, and the band were dropped from Virgin after the label was sold to EMI in 1992, causing the band to split up and abandon their second album. Nonetheless, Sundew received acclaim from music critics, and today is regarded as a classic of its genre.

== Background ==
Seven-piece Paris Angels formed in Manchester. Lead singer Rikki Turner, guitarist Paul Wagstaff and bassist Scott Carey were the group's original members, writing songs in the style of Echo & the Bunnymen, but later additions to the band brought other influences, including backing singer Jayne Gill, who was a fan of the Velvet Underground, and Steven Tajti, who was interested in Moog synthesisers, and his addition to the band contributed to what Carey described as "that Donna Summer/Kraftwerk (in our minds) edge." As the group performed Velvet Underground and Bunnymen covers, they began listening to electro and early house music. The group arrived on the music scene as the Madchester scene was peaking in popularity, and the scene caused the band to change direction and begin fusing acid house with indie music; Carey later told Louder Than War:

"At first we listened to Television, 13th Floor Elevators, Doors, Magazine, Bunnymen etc.. and we just copied that, but we also loved P-funk and it was seeing the Mondays that really had a big influence on us, they showed us you could be anyone and do twisted funk, when Wags got a wah-wah pedal that changed us, then all the Chicago house stuff at the Hacienda, at first we kind of shunned it, but it was Acid House with the synths that we ‘got’ and then it was like a new dawn happen and old dirty mac Manchester, lost the industrial edge and became more Day-Glo."

According to Damon Wilkinson of Manchester Evening News, the group combined their love of acid house, post-punk and the Velvet Underground to "create their own unique take on Baggy," a combination brought together on their best-known song, "Perfume" (1990), which was the group's debut single, released after singing to independent label Sheer Joy. The song was a Top Ten hit on the UK Indie Chart in the summer of 1990. Produced by Michael Johnson, also known for engineering New Order, the song is considered one of the greatest Madchester singles, with its combination of whooshing synths, glistening guitars and the vocals of Jayne Gill and Turner. Mancunian pop biographer John Robb recons the song is a "great piece of melancholic, psychedelic Manc-pop." The subsequent singles "Scope" and "Fade" were nearly as successful, leading to the group signing a deal with Virgin Records, a deal the group later regretted. Carey explained: "We were skint. Sheer Joy ploughed any profits from singles back into the label and being a 7 piece band on an indie label wasn’t easy. Sheer Joy was great to work with as we had control but Virgin funded us which meant better studios and more time in studios but we had A&R to deal with."

== Recording and composition ==
"The album was recorded at The Windings in North Wales, it was great, few disagreements at times but who wouldn't with 7 in a band. Sundew captured the band at that time. Would I change it definitely not, each song captures a moment in the bands early years."

— Backing singer Jayne Gill, 2018.

With Johnson returning as producer, Sundew was recorded at Suite 16 Studios in June 1990 and The Windings, North Wales in March 1991, with further recording that year taking place in York. Most of the recording took place at The Windings, which was located near Wrexham, and the group lived there for a month. Carey recalled: "Recording Sundew was a brilliant time. We recorded most of it in Wales near Wrexham and we lived there for a month and did really long sessions followed by really long partying, were we exhausted but really put a lot into it. There was an optimism that what we were doing was the start of a lot to come, we naively thought the 6 LP deal we signed would be seen out." Backing singer Jayne Gill recalls there were several disagreements at times during recording, but felt this was expected as the group had seven members. Pee Wee Coleman engineered the album sessions, although Ronan Sargeant engineered the album's sixth track, "Perfume (All on You)".

Mostly written by Turner, Wagstaff and Carey, Sundew blends Northern jangle pop and indie with stately electronic instrumentation and uplifting dance-pop. Writer Andrew Harrison notices the disparate range of styles, highlighting the "[c]oquettish English indie-whimsy, deep techno, beery conviction rock, wimpedelia, rainy Northern drug music and a sensibility that veers from the thoughtful to the thuggish." The band experimented with different ideas and brought them to the album, resulting in what Carey described as a "fair old mix." Writer Stuart Huggett described "Perfume (All on You)", a remix of the earlier single "Perfume", as "superior to anything Factory was releasing in the baggy summer of 1990, particularly in the striking, panned programming." The track features lyrics of disintegrating love and features a house bassline and a techno ambience; other songs on the album include the love song "Louise", the synth-laden New Order-esque "Breathless" and indie styled "Chaos (Stupid Stupid)". "What Goes On", meanwhile, is a cover of the Velvet Underground song written by Lou Reed.

== Release and reception ==
Professional ratings
Review scores
Source	Rating
AllMusic	4/5 stars
Select	3/5 stars

Released by Virgin in 1991, Sundew was Paris Angels' debut album, with artwork designed by Craig Johnson, using photography by Peter Ashworth. The thank you message to "switch cards and understanding bank managers" in the liner notes reflected the band's financial problems. The album was greeted with a generally positive reception by British music magazines, including rave reviews from the NME, Melody Maker and Vox magazines. Andrew Harrison of Select felt the album was a "weird junction for the disparate and conflicting regions of six people's record collections and, wisely, Paris Angels haven't embarked on the tedious task of tooling them all into a homogenised (boring) Paris Angels sound." He hailed how "in abandoning themselves to other people's undertows, Paris Angels have wound up sounding like themselves. Sundew is 60 percent of a groovy LP. It might even be brilliant pop." A Newcastle Evening Chronicle reviewer hailed the band's "distinctive blend of contemporary dance and rock sounds, but ultimately there's a spark missing."

Despite lacking a hit single, the album entered the Top 40 of the UK Albums Chart, debuting and peaking at number 37 on 17 August 1991 and remaining on the chart for two weeks. The single "Fade" also reached number 70 on the UK Singles Chart the following month. The general commercial indifference that greeted the album nonetheless coincided with the Madchester scene falling out of public favour, and the group were dropped from Virgin's roster after the label was sold to EMI in 1992, along with other bands like Public Image Ltd. Paris Angels subsequently abandoned work on their second album and split up the following year, as the label dropping left them without monetary necessities; the follow-up was eventually released in 2015 as Eclipse, containing the song "Complete Mind", an alternate version of the Sundew song "Breathless". Sundew remains acclaimed in later times, and is considered by Louder Than War writer Matt Mead to be a classic. Stuart Huggett of The Quietus described the album as "a finely balanced blend of Northern indie jangle, stately electronics and euphoric dancepop."

== Track listing ==
All songs written by Paris Angels except were stated.

1. "Eternity" – 3:21
2. "Fade" – 3:58
3. "Smile" – 3:32
4. "Slippery Man" – 3:51
5. "What Goes On" (Lou Reed) – 4:04
6. "Perfume (All on You)" – 5:57
7. "Louise" – 3:08
8. "Breathless" – 5:34
9. "Chaos (Stupid Stupid)" – 4:02
10. "Purest Values" – 4:08
11. "Oh Yes" – 6:38

== Personnel ==
=== Paris Angels ===
- Rikki Turner – vocals, wind instruments
- Jayne Gill – vocals, percussion
- Steven Tajti – keyboards, programming
- Scott Carey – bass, harmonicas
- Mark Adj – rhythm guitar, percussion
- Simon Worrall – drums, more drums
- Paul Wagstaff - guitar, noises

=== Other ===
- Craig Johnson – design
- Pee Wee Coleman – engineering (tracks 1–5, 7–11)
- Ronan Sargeant – engineering (track 6)
- Loopzilla – backing vocals (track 4)
- Peter Asworth – photography
- Michael Johnson – production, mixing
