= The Creepers =

English rock band

- Also known as: Marc Riley and the Creepers, The Lost Soul Crusaders
- Origin: Manchester, England
- Genres: Rock, post-punk
- Years active: 1982–1988
- Labels: In-Tape, Red Rhino
- Past members: Marc Riley; Eddie Fenn; Paul Fletcher (1982-85); Pete Keogh (1982-85); Mark Tilton (1986-88); Phil Roberts (1986-88)

The Creepers were an English rock group, formed in Manchester in 1982, originally known as Marc Riley and the Creepers. After being dismissed from The Fall by Mark E. Smith, Marc Riley formed his own record label (In-Tape) with Jim Khambatta, and his own band. The first single "Favourite Sister" (which featured his former bandmates Steve Hanley, Craig Scanlon and Paul Hanley) was followed up with "Jumper Clown", which poked fun at his previous band's singer. A Peel Session was the source of the next release in 1984, with a compilation of these early releases, Cull, following the same year. First album proper, Gross Out, appeared in June 1984. 1985 saw the release of the second album Fancy Meeting God as well as a swansong live album Warts 'n' All towards the end of the year.

Riley then recruited ex-Membranes Mark Tilton and Phil Roberts of Shrubs, and carried on as simply "The Creepers". With a more sophisticated sound, the first release under this name was a cover of Brian Eno's "Baby's on Fire", with the album Miserable Sinners following later the same year. After signing to Red Rhino, a further single, "Brute" and album Rock 'n' Roll Liquorice Flavour appeared in 1987 and 1988 respectively. Sleeper: A Retrospective followed in 1989.

The band briefly became 'The Lost Soul Crusaders' before splitting up.

== Discography ==
Chart placings shown are from the UK Independent Chart.

=== Albums ===
Marc Riley and the Creepers

- Cull (Apr 1984, In-Tape [LP]) No. 9
- Gross Out (Jun 1984, In-Tape [LP]) No. 11
- Fancy Meeting God (Mar 1985, In-Tape [LP]) No. 23
- Live – Warts 'n' All (Nov 1985, In-Tape [LP]) No. 5

The Creepers

- Miserable Sinners (Nov 1986, In-Tape [LP/C]) No. 14
- Rock 'n' Roll Liquorice Flavour (Jan 1988, Red Rhino [LP/C/CD])
- Sleeper: A Retrospective (1989, Bleed Records [double LP])

=== Singles ===
Marc Riley and the Creepers

- "Favourite Sister" (Jul 1983, In-Tape [7"])
- "Jumper Clown" (Oct 1983, In-Tape [7"])
- "Creeping at Maida Vale" (Feb 1984, In-Tape [7"/12"]) No. 5
- "Pollystiffs" (May 1984, IT006, In-Tape [7"]) No. 11
- "Shadow Figure" (Sep 1984, In-Tape [12"]) No. 5
- "4 A's from Maida Vale" (Oct 1985, In-Tape [2 x 7"/12"]) No. 7

The Creepers

- "Baby's on Fire" (May 1986, In-Tape [7"/12"]) No. 8
- "Brute" (Jun 1987, Red Rhino [7"/12"]) No. 29
