= John Dowie (humourist) =

British comedian, musician and writer (born 1950)

John Dowie (born 3 August 1950 in Birmingham) is a British comedian, musician and writer, often viewed as a pioneer of alternative comedy. He began performing stand-up comedy in 1969.

== Career ==
Described as an "idiosyncratic original" and "lone pioneer", Dowie's "arthouse proto-alternative" work mixed parody, fantasy, impersonations and taboo topics. His innovative comic style led him to being seen by many comedians that followed, such as Alexei Sayle, Tony Allen, Mark Steel and Jeremy Hardy, as a precursor to the alternative comedy wave that arrived a few years later, with comedy impresario Malcolm Hardee noting that Dowie's work predated even the founding of the Comedy Store. In particular, Dowie was credited with establishing observational humour as part of the new movement.

Dowie began performing comedy as early as 1969 at the Midlands Arts Centre in Birmingham In 1972 he appeared at the Edinburgh Fringe with a solo show. He was influenced by comedy-oriented alternative theatre companies like Cliffhanger, The Combination and John Bull Puncture Repair Kit, and saw himself as performing a solo version of the same kind of comedy. In a 2018 interview, he recalled, 'It wasn't so much stand-up as solo sketch comedy.'

In 1977 he toured with and influenced another alternative pioneer Victoria Wood. As well as writing songs and sketches with her, he is credited with helping her to develop her future trademark patter between songs.

Dowie was among the inaugural acts on Tony Wilson's Factory Records label. In 1978 he contributed three comedic songs to the first Factory music release, A Factory Sample, along with Joy Division, the Durutti Column, and Cabaret Voltaire. However his best remembered song remains the satirical "British Tourist (I Hate the Dutch)" from his debut EP Another Close Shave, issued by Virgin in 1977.

In 1981 a seven-inch single followed on Factory Records, the Martin Hannett-produced "It's Hard to be an Egg", which Dowie described as a flop. "It's Hard to be an Egg" was also featured in episode 1 of the Wood and Walters show. It is noteworthy as having unusual packaging even by Factory standards: the disc is white vinyl with a "yolk" printed on the label, and is housed in a clear plastic sleeve with a real white feather. Dowie's final Factory contribution was a VHS video entitled simply Dowie, a recording of a live performance at the Edinburgh Festival Fringe with Ralph Steadman cover art.

In 1987 Dowie issued a live album, Good Grief, recorded at the Zap Club in Brighton, but by 1991 had all but retired from stand-up comedy and performed his last stand-up show Why I Stopped Being a Stand-Up Comedian that year. In March 1991 he broadcast A World of Dowie, a 4 part series on relationships for BBC Radio 4.

As a director, he worked on Heathcote Williams' Whale Nation and Falling for a Dolphin, as well as directing shows by, among others, Neil Innes, Arthur Smith, Barry Cryer and Ronnie Golden, Simon Munnery and the late Pete McCarthy in The Hangover Show. His children's show Dogman, directed by Victor Spinetti, was described by the Daily Mail's Jack Tinker as the best show he had seen in Edinburgh that year. Dowie went on to write and perform Jesus – My Boy which was performed in London's West End by Tom Conti, in Tel Aviv by noted Israeli comedian Gil Kopatz, and in various productions/translations in Canada, Sweden, Norway, Germany and the Netherlands. He retired from theatrical work entirely in 2005.

In 2005 Dowie collaborated with Phill Jupitus and Neil Innes on a musical comedy CD for children, and in 2006 recorded a remake of "British Tourist" with the Dutch computer music group the POW Ensemble, for X-OR Records. An archive CD titled An Arc of Hives was issued by LTM Recordings in 2012, with sleevenotes by Stewart Lee and Dave Cohen.

== Books ==
- Sit-Down Comedy (contributor to anthology, ed Malcolm Hardee & John Fleming). Ebury Press/Random House, 2003. ISBN 0-09-188924-3; ISBN 978-0-09-188924-1
- Hard To Swallow (with Hunt Emerson). Knockabout, 1988. ISBN 978-0-86166-060-5
- Dogman (with Delphine Thomas). BBC Worldwide Ltd, 2003. ISBN 0-563-47697-4
- The Freewheeling John Dowie. Unbound, 2017
- Before I Go. P&H Books, 2024. ISBN 978-1-910631-85-0
- Jesus My Boy. P&H Books, 2026 ISBN 978-1-910631-84-3
