= Chris Joyce =

English drummer (born 1957)

- Born: 11 October 1957 (age 68)
- Origin: Chorlton, Manchester, England
- Occupation: Musician
- Instruments: Drums
- Years active: 1970s – 2010
- Label: Factory

Chris Joyce (born 11 October 1957 in Manchester, England) is an English musician, known for being the drummer with various groups and with Simply Red in the 1980s.

Coming from Chorlton, Manchester, he adopted the hippie lifestyle. His most remote band was Fast Breeder, a short-lived late 1970s punk group from Manchester formed by him on drums and Dave Rowbotham on guitar and managed by Tony Wilson. Wilson called Joyce and Rowbotham to form a band alongside guitarist Vini Reilly and bass guitarist Tony Bowers, The Durutti Column. That line-up released only two songs from Factory's first EP, A Factory Sample, before Joyce, Rowbotham and Bowers quit the band to form another post-punk band around 1979, The Mothmen.

The Mothmen released only two studio albums and a number of singles, before disbanding in the 1980s. During his time with The Mothmen, Joyce worked with Pink Military, London Underground and Judy Nylon. By the mid-1980s, he was working with Suns of Arqa, playing drums on their second LP Wadada Magic. He later formed Simply Red, alongside his bandmate Tony Bowers and singer Mick Hucknall.

Joyce shares further details of his life and career, up to and beyond his work with Simply Red, in his biography on Chris Joyce School of Drums.
