= Richard Witts =

English musician and musicologist

- Dick Witts, 2006

Background information
- Born: Cleethorpes, Lincolnshire, England
- Genres: Music, musicology
- Occupations: Singer/songwriter, musician, author
- Instruments: Percussion, keyboards
- Years active: 1978–present
- Labels: Virgin, Cherry Red, LTM
- Formerly of: The Passage; Hallé Orchestra
- Website: richardwitts.com

Richard "Dick" Witts (born in Cleethorpes, Lincolnshire) is an English musicologist, music historian, and ex leader of 1980s band the Passage. He attended Clee Grammar School for Boys.

He studied at the Royal Manchester College of Music and briefly at Manchester University. During this time he was a member of the Hallé Orchestra as a percussionist. During the mid-1970s he wrote for the contemporary classical music magazine Contact.

At that time, he was also involved in starting a Manchester Musicians Collective (on the model of the recently established London Musicians Collective). This led into contact with the growing punk scene and he formed the Passage, producing their recordings and singing on many of their releases.

He presented television programme Oxford Road Show in the early 1980s for the BBC from Oxford Road Studios, Manchester and was also a reporter for BBC Radio 3.

Thirty of his radio interviews and contributions are housed in the British Library Sound Archive. In 2003 he gave the Saul Seminar there on the history of music presentation in radio.

During the late 1980s, he became involved in arts administration roles. He subsequently wrote a critical history of the Arts Council of Great Britain: Artist Unknown: An Alternative History of the Arts Council.

His first book, Nico – the Lives and Lies of an Icon, was a biographical study of the German singer and songwriter (Virgin Books, 1993).

Witts lives in Liverpool and is a writer who has lectured at the University of Edinburgh, Goldsmiths College, London, the University of Surrey in Guildford and the University of Sussex. He was appointed Research Fellow at the University of Edinburgh where he made a simple catalogue of the archive of Sir Donald Francis Tovey (1875–1940). In 2010, he was invited by Edge Hill University, Ormskirk, to design an Honours course in music.

His third book, a study of the music and history of The Velvet Underground, was published by Equinox (UK) and the Indiana University Press (USA) in September 2006. He has also written chapters for the following academic books: Kraftwerk: Music Non-Stop(Continuum, 2011), Mark E. Smith and the Fall: Art, Music and Politics, (Ashgate, 2010), and the Cambridge Companion to Recorded Music (Cambridge University Press, 2009).

Witts is mentioned in the book Audio Culture: Readings in Modern Music. He is credited with sending a package containing some of Aphex Twin's music to Karlheinz Stockhausen. He is researching a book on the history of British music from 1941 to 2000.

Witts is consultant to the ensemble Icebreaker.
