= The Mothmen =

- Origin: Manchester, England
- Genres: Punk rock, post-punk, indie rock, new wave
- Years active: c. 1979–1982
- Labels: Absurd, On-U Sound, Do It Records
- Past members: Dave Rowbotham; Tony Bowers; Chris Joyce; Bob Harding; Ronnie Hardman; Charlie Griffiths

The Mothmen were a short-lived post-punk band from England, formed around 1979 by Dave Rowbotham, Chris Joyce and Tony Bowers, shortly after they left The Durutti Column, including ex-Alberto Y Lost Trios Paranoias singer Bob Harding.

== History ==
In 1978, Tony Wilson and Alan Erasmus cofounded The Durutti Column, with guitarists Vini Reilly and Dave Rowbotham, bassist Tony Bowers (formerly of Alberto Y Lost Trios Paranoias), drummer Chris Joyce, and vocalist Phil Rainford. After releasing two songs in a various artists compilation, A Factory Sample, that year, the Durutti Column became the sole concern of Reilly and Bowers, as Rowbotham and Joyce departed and formed The Mothmen, alongside former Alberto Y Lost Trios Paranoias singer Bob Harding. So, the first lineup comprised Joyce on drums; Bowers on guitar, bass, vocals, violin, and percussion; Rowbotham on guitar and bass; and Bob Harding on bass, organ, guitar, vocals, and percussion. In 1979, they released their debut single on Absurd Records, "Does It Matter Irene?"

The recording of an album's worth of material in the first half of 1980 left the group without a label to release it on. Thus in stepped the assistance of a young and cash-strapped Adrian Sherwood, having just launched On-U Sound. A deal was done and in 1981 Pay Attention! appeared as its second album. The arrangement and production work remained the Mothmen's own with Sherwood playing no part in its creation. Sherwood's only direct involvement with the band was when he provided a dub mix of "Afghan Farmer Driving Cattle" [Rhythm 137] on On-U's first compilation release – Wild Paarty Sounds Volume 1.

During this period Joyce also found time to be the drummer for another one of On-U Sound's first generation 'crew', London Underground, as well appearing on Judy Nylon's "Pal Judy" set for the label. However, the Mothmen soon left for Do-It Records and in the process Rowbotham was replaced by Ronnie Hardman (bass) and Charlie Griffiths (synthesisers). The new line-up produced a handful more singles and a further album, One Black Dot, before they split for good in early 1982.

Of the Mothmen's former members, Joyce and Bowers were to have the greatest subsequent commercial success, forming part of the first Simply Red rhythm section between 1984 and 1989. The On-U association with Joyce and Bowers had two final outcomes in the UK, in the form of Sherwood's providing flip-side mixes to Simply Red's "Holding Back the Years" and "Infidelity" 12" singles. Through the Sly & Robbie connection, Sherwood also contributed to Simply Red's 1997 "Night Nurse" cover of Gregory Isaacs' song.

In 1991, founding guitarist Dave Rowbotham was murdered. Tony Bowers lives between Italy and Ireland where he works on various musical projects . Chris Joyce shares further details of his life and career, up to and beyond his work with Simply Red, on his biography in Chris Joyce School of Drums.

== Discography ==
=== Studio albums ===
- Pay Attention! (On-U Sound, 1981)
- One Black Dot (Do It, 1982)

=== Singles ===
- "Does It Matter Irene?" (Absurd, 1979)
- "Show Me Your House and Car" (Do It, 1981)
- "Temptation" (Do It, 1981)
- "Wadada" (Do It, 1982)
