= Tony Friel =

- Born: 4 May 1958 (age 66)
- Origin: Birkenhead, England
- Genres: Punk rock, new wave, post-punk, synth-pop
- Occupation: Musician
- Instrument(s): Bass guitar, guitar
- Years active: 1976–present

Tony Friel (born 4 May 1958) is an English bass guitarist, known for his role in different new wave bands.

He attended Heys Boys Secondary School, where he met Martin Bramah and attained an art O-Level. He and Bramah shared many interests. In the mid-1970s, they were introduced by their friend Barbara Smith to her brother Mark E. Smith and his friend Una Baines. Smith, Baines, Bramah and Friel shared interests in music, and formed their first band, the Fall. Friel remained until December 1977, then he left.

After the Fall, Friel formed a project called Contact and a band called the Passage. In late 1978, he and his former Fall bandmate Karl Burns joined the Teardrops, a group which included Buzzcocks bassist Steve Garvey. They released the Leave Me No Choice EP, and in 1980, the Final Vinyl album, before breaking up.

In subsequent years Friel played with R&B bands. Later he was member of the Woodbank Streetband.

== Discography ==
- Bingo-Master's Break-Out – The Fall (1978)
- New Love Songs 7-inch EP – Passage (Object Music, 1978)
- Future 7-inch EP – Contact (Object Music, 1979)

== See also ==
- List of The Fall members
