= The Passage (band) =

English post-punk band

- The Passage, 1980

Background information
- Origin: Manchester, England
- Genres: Synth-pop; post-punk
- Years active: 1978–1983
- Labels: Cherry Red; Night & Day
- Past members: Tony Friel; Lorraine Hilton; Martine Hilton; Lizzy Johnson; Paul Mahoney; Joe Mckechnie; Andy Wilson; Richard Witts

The Passage were a post-punk band from Manchester, England, who appeared on several record labels including Object Music, Cherry Red Records, and their own label Night & Day, a subsidiary label to Virgin Records.

The band was formed as a quartet by songwriter and former Hallé Orchestra percussionist Richard Witts in 1978, but later became a trio. Witts produced the band's recordings and sang on most of their releases, the occasional lead vocal being taken by Tony Friel or Andy Wilson. Although they never truly broke into the mainstream, their most successful song was "XOYO" which came 41st in John Peel's Festive Fifty for 1982 (the top 50 songs of the year voted for by the listeners). The song was an experiment to see whether John Cage's method of aleatoric composition could be successfully applied to popular music composition. "XOYO" also appeared on the Cherry Red compilation album Pillows & Prayers. The band broke up in 1983.

Richard Witts is now a lecturer and has taught at the University of Edinburgh, Goldsmiths University in London and currently teaches at Edge Hill University in Lancashire. Andy Wilson is a club and radio DJ based mainly in Ibiza. Joe Mckechnie is a producer, remixer, and DJ based in Liverpool. He has released records on Acacia (Detroit), Ochre (UK), Blood (UK) and Aspro (Holland) amongst others. Recent remixes include Ladytron/ROC and Echo & the Bunnymen.

In 2003, the entire Passage back catalogue was reissued and remastered across 5 CDs by the LTM label.

== Discography ==
=== Albums ===
- Pindrop - Object Music (Nov 1980)
- For All and None - Night & Day (Jul 1981)
- Degenerates - Cherry Red (Jun 1982)
- Enflame - Cherry Red (Mar 1983)
- BBC Sessions - LTM (Mar 2003)

=== Singles and EPs ===
- New Love Songs EP - "Love Song" / "The Competition" / "Slit Machine" / "New Kind of Love" (Object Music OM2) (Dec 1978)
- About Time EP - "Taking My Time" / "Clock Paradox" / "16 Hours" / "Time Delay" (Object Music OM8) (Oct 1979)
- "Devils and Angels" / "Watching You Dance" (Night & Day AMPM 24.00) (Feb 1981)
- "Troops Out" / "Hip Rebels" (Night & Day AMPM 22.00) (May 1981)
- "XOYO" / "Animal in Me" (Cherry Red CHERRY 35) (May 1982)
- "Wave" / "Angleland" (Cherry Red CHERRY 50) (Oct 1982)
- "Sharp Tongue" / "BRD USA GDR JFK" (Cherry Red CHERRY 58) (Mar 1983)

=== Compilations ===
- Through the Passage - Cherry Red (Nov 1983)
- Seedy - Cherry Red (Re-issue 1997)
