= Cargo Studios =

Recording studio in Manchester, England

Coordinates: 53.6154°N 2.1537°W

Cargo Studios was a recording studio located on Kenion Street, off Drake Street, Rochdale, Greater Manchester, England. It was opened in 1977 by John Brierley (who had gained notoriety in the early 1970s as producer of Tractor's first two albums) and lasted in its first incarnation until 1984. The studio is synonymous with the rise of the post-punk music scene in the North of England and as the incubator of many bands that would go on to make their mark in the UK and worldwide, including Joy Division, the Fall, the Teardrop Explodes, Blue Orchids, the Chameleons, the Membranes, Echo and the Bunnymen, Flight and Orchestral Manoeuvres in the Dark.

One of the best known songs recorded at the studio is Joy Division's "Atmosphere".

On 23 September 2009, a blue plaque was placed on the building, in recognition of the role it played in the British music scene.
