= Timeline of music in Manchester =

This is a timeline of music in Greater Manchester

== 19th century ==
=== 1830s ===
- 1836
  - 23 September: Esteemed Spanish opera singer Maria Malibran dies after collapsing while performing at the Theatre Royal on Fountain Street

=== 1840s ===
- 1840
  - The first (temporary) Free Trade Hall is built
- 1842
  - The second Free Trade Hall is built

=== 1850s ===
- 1853
  - Conductor Charles Hallé first moves to Manchester to direct the orchestra for Gentlemen's Concerts
- 1856
  - 8 October: The third (and last) Free Trade Hall (begun 1853) is completed
- 1857
  - Fledgling Hallé orchestra formed
- 1858
  - 30 January: The Hallé gives its first concert as a permanent orchestra under Charles Hallé at the Free Trade Hall

=== 1880s ===
- 1888
  - Charles Hallé is knighted

=== 1890s ===
- 1893
  - October: Royal Manchester College of Music, established by Charles Hallé, admits its first students
- 1899
  - Hans Richter is appointed music director of The Hallé, a post which he will hold until 1911

== 20th century ==
=== 1900s ===
- 1901
  - CWS (Manchester) Band formed as the CWS Tobacco Factory Band
  - Hulme Hippodrome opens, becoming a variety theatre, with skiffle and rock gigs in 1950s (becomes a Mecca bingo hall in 1962, gigs again in 1980s and 2010s)
- 1902
  - The Playhouse, Hulme, opens (later a BBC Studio, 1955–1986)
- 1904
  - Ardwick Empire (later, Manchester Hippodrome) opens as a music hall (demolished 1964)
- 1908
  - 3 December: The Hallé gives the world première of Elgar's Symphony No. 1 under Hans Richter at the Free Trade Hall

=== 1910s ===
- 1910
  - Kings Hall at Belle Vue Zoological Gardens opens
- 1912
  - 26 December: Manchester Opera House opens as the New Theatre in Quay Street

=== 1920s ===
- 1920s
  - Manchester Jazz Appreciation Society founded, meeting in the Unicorn Hotel off Oldham Street
- 1922
  - 15 November: The British Broadcasting Company begins regular radio broadcasts from its Manchester station 2ZY at the Metropolitan-Vickers works in Trafford Park. The 2ZY Orchestra, predecessor of the BBC Philharmonic, is formed
- 1927
  - The Ritz (Manchester) is built in Whitworth Street West, Manchester.

=== 1930s ===
- 1930
  - November: Maurice Chevalier plays 4 concerts at Belle Vue, Manchester
- 1934
  - The Northern Studio Orchestra is renamed the BBC Northern Orchestra
- 1935
  - 7 March: Sergei Rachmaninoff gives the English première of his Rhapsody on a Theme of Paganini with The Hallé under Nikolai Malko at the Free Trade Hall.

=== 1940s ===
- 1940
  - 22–24 December: Heaviest raids of the Manchester Blitz by the Luftwaffe. Cross Street Chapel is destroyed, the Free Trade Hall is gutted and many other buildings badly damaged
- 1943
  - John Barbirolli is appointed principal conductor of The Hallé, a post which he will hold until 1968
- 1946
  - 3 February: The Hallé Orchestra and Chorus (conducted by John Barbirolli) perform Aida at Belle Vue, Manchester
- 1949
  - 2 October: Yehudi Menuhin and the Liverpool Philharmonic (conducted by Malcolm Sargent) play at Belle Vue, Manchester
  - John Barbirolli is knighted
  - Ewan MacColl writes 'Dirty Old Town' about Salford

=== 1950s ===
- 1950s
  - Some music students in Manchester informally constitute New Music Manchester
- 1950
  - Ewan MacColl releases his first single 'The Asphalter's Song' on Topic Records
- 1951
  - The Free Trade Hall, rebuilt after bomb damage, reopens as a concert venue
- 1956
  - November: Johnnie Ray plays at Belle Vue, Manchester
- 1957
  - 13 February: Bill Haley and his Comets play at the Odeon, Manchester
  - Ewan MacColl writes 'The First Time Ever I Saw Your Face' for Peggy Seeger
- 1959
  - 9 March: Louis Armstrong and The All-Stars play the King's Hall at Belle Vue, Manchester
  - July: Marty Wilde plays at the Free Trade Hall
  - 15 November: Three of the later Beatles (as Johnny and the Moondogs) play in the regional finals of a TV talent show at Manchester Hippodrome, Ardwick Green. Heats had been held at the Liverpool Empire during October. Possibly their first stage gig outside of Liverpool. John, Paul and George reportedly couldn't afford lodgings so had to leave to return to Liverpool before the final voting.

=== 1960s ===
- 1962
  - 7 March, The Beatles record at The Playhouse, Hulme, for BBC Radio, Teenager's Turn - Here We Go, (transmitted on 8 March). They return on 11 June 1962, this time recording their first Lennon-McCartney song, Ask Me Why (transmitted on 15 June)
  - March: Freddie and the Dreamers are formed in West Didsbury
  - 21 October: The first American Folk Blues Festival European tour plays its only UK date at the Free Trade Hall; artists include Sonny Terry, Brownie McGhee and T-Bone Walker. It will be influential on the British R&B scene, with the audience including Mick Jagger, Keith Richards and Brian Jones of The Rolling Stones with Jimmy Page, John Mayall and other musicians, and with a second show filmed and shown on ITV.
  - December: The Hollies are formed in Manchester
- 1963
  - February: The Beatles play a sold-out show at the Oasis coffee bar/venue on Lloyd Street
  - June: Wayne Fontana and the Mindbenders are formed
  - The Toggery Five are formed in Manchester
  - Twisted Wheel Club music venue opened by the Abadi brothers in Brazenose Street, replaces the Left Wing Coffee Bar
- 1964
  - 29 March: Jerry Lee Lewis plays at the Kings Hall, Belle Vue, Manchester
  - 22 May: Carl Perkins and The Nashville Teens play at the Odeon, Manchester
  - 6 June: Carl Perkins and the Nashville Teens play at the Twisted Wheel Club, Manchester
  - 29 September: Bill Haley & His Comets play at the Odeon, Manchester
  - 9 October: Bill Haley and his Comets play at both the Astoria, Manchester and the Odeon, Manchester
  - Herman's Hermits are formed
- 1965
  - April–May: Freddie and the Dreamers, Wayne Fontana and the Mindbenders and Herman's Hermits consecutively top the American Billboard charts
- 1966
  - 1 January: Manchester Corporation Act comes into force effectively shutting down many coffee bars, clubs and venues
  - 17 May: Bob Dylan and the Hawks perform at the Free Trade Hall. Dylan is booed by the audience because of his decision to tour with an electric band, culminating in a famous shout of "Judas"
  - 31 July: Jethro Tull play at Belle Vue, Manchester
  - 4 September: The Who play Belle Vue, Manchester
  - September: Barclay James Harvest are formed in Oldham
  - 11 December): Family play at Belle Vue
  - The Toggery Five disband
- 1967
  - 24 May: Jimi Hendrix plays at Belle Vue
- 1968
  - After 25 years with The Hallé, John Barbirolli retires from the principal conductorship
- 1969
  - Chetham's Hospital becomes Chetham's School of Music

=== 1970s ===
- 1971
  - 17 August: Johnny Cash plays first of 3 shows at the Kings Hall, Belle Vue
  - 30 November: Led Zeppelin play at the Kings Hall, Belle Vue
  - Herman's Hermits disband
  - Twisted Wheel Club closes down
- 1972
  - July: T. Rex perform at Belle Vue
  - 10cc are formed in Stockport
  - Mott the Hoople play the Free Trade Hall
- 1973
  - October: The Royal Manchester College of Music merges with the Northern School of Music to form the Royal Northern College of Music
  - Alberto y Lost Trios Paranoias are formed in Manchester
- 1975
  - Houghton Weavers are formed in Westhoughton, Bolton
  - Slaughter & the Dogs are formed in Wythenshawe, Manchester
- 1976
  - February: Buzzcocks are formed in Bolton
  - 1 April: Buzzcocks play for first time at Bolton Institute of Technology
  - 4 June: Sex Pistols play at the Lesser Free Trade Hall in Manchester
  - 20 July: Sex Pistols play at the Lesser Free Trade Hall in Manchester, supported by Buzzcocks and Slaughter & the Dogs
  - December: Sex Pistols play twice at the Electric Circus, Manchester in December 1976, including 9 December 1976
  - Electric Circus, Manchester opens as a punk rock venue
  - Sad Café are formed in Manchester
- 1977
  - January: The Damned play at the Electric Circus, Manchester
  - April: Magazine are formed in Manchester by Howard Devoto and John McGeoch
  - 8 May: *White Riot Tour play at the Electric Circus, Manchester featuring The Clash, The Slits, Buzzcocks and Subway Sect
  - 29 May: Warsaw play for the first time at the Electric Circus, Manchester (despite being billed as The Stiff Kittens), supporting Buzzcocks, Penetration, John Cooper Clarke and Jon the Postman.
  - 2 October: Electric Circus, Manchester closes (see also: Short Circuit: Live at the Electric Circus)
  - A Certain Ratio are formed in Flixton
  - Godley & Creme are formed in Manchester
  - The Ramones play first gig in Manchester at the Electric Circus, Manchester
- 1978
  - The Durutti Column are founded in Manchester
  - Factory Records is founded by Tony Wilson and Alan Erasmus
  - Warsaw are renamed Joy Division

=== 1980s ===
- 1980
  - Happy Mondays formed in Salford
- 1981
  - Buzzcocks disband
  - The Chameleons are formed in Middleton, Greater Manchester
- 1982
  - 11 May: Eurovision Young Musicians 1982 contest takes place at the Free Trade Hall
  - 21 May: The Haçienda opens as a nightclub in Whitworth Street
  - May: The Smiths are formed
  - 4 October: The Smiths play their first gig, supporting Blue Rondo à la Turk at The Ritz (Manchester)
  - A Witness are formed in Stockport
  - Alberto y Lost Trios Paranoias disband
  - James formed in Whalley Range, Manchester
  - The BBC Northern Orchestra is renamed the BBC Philharmonic
- 1983
  - 6 July: The Smiths play at The Haçienda, Manchester
  - Big Flame are formed in Manchester
  - Inspiral Carpets are formed in Oldham
  - The Membranes relocate to Manchester
  - The Stone Roses are formed in Manchester
  - Wax formed by Andrew Gold and Graham Gouldman
- 1984
  - Too Much Texas formed in Manchester
- 1986
  - Blue Zone are formed
- 1987
  - Autechre are formed in Rochdale
  - The Chameleons disband
  - Man from Delmonte are formed in Manchester
  - The Smiths disband
  - 17 October: Desmond Decker and the Aces play at Hulme Hippodrome
- 1988
  - Electronic are formed by Bernard Sumner and Johnny Marr
- 1989
  - Buzzcocks are re-formed

=== 1990s ===
- 1990
  - M People formed by Mike Pickering
- 1991
  - 2 May: Nina Simone plays at the opening of the NIA Centre (1991-1997), at The Playhouse, Hulme
  - 18 August: Oasis play their first gig, at the Boardwalk club
  - Oasis are formed in Manchester
- 1993
  - Happy Mondays disband
  - Black Grape are formed in Salford by Shaun Ryder and Bez
- 1995
  - 15 July: Manchester Arena opens at Victoria station
  - Goldblade are formed in Manchester by John Robb
  - Inspiral Carpets disband
- 1996
  - 27 & 28 April: Oasis play at Maine Road, Manchester
  - 3 & 4 August: Oasis play at Balloch Country Park, Scotland, to an audience of 80,000 over the two nights
  - 10 & 11 August: Oasis play the Knebworth Festival to an audience of 125,000 people each night
  - 11 September: Bridgewater Hall opens as an orchestral concert venue. The Free Trade Hall closes this year as a public venue and is subsequently redeveloped as an hotel
  - Lamb are formed in Manchester
- 1997
  - Elbow are formed in Bury
- 1998
  - Doves are formed in Manchester
- 1999
  - I Am Kloot are formed in Manchester
  - Working for a Nuclear Free City are formed in Manchester

== 21st century ==
=== 2000s ===
- 2000
  - The Chameleons are re-formed
- 2003
  - The Chameleons disband again
- 2006
  - 14 April: Manchester Passion television special broadcast by BBC Three from Manchester
  - Courteeners are formed in Middleton
- 2007
  - 28 June–15 July: Inaugural Manchester International Festival.
- 2008
  - Elbow win the Mercury Music Prize for their album The Seldom Seen Kid
- 2009
  - August: Oasis disband after the departure of Noel Gallagher
  - Elbow win the Brit Award for Best British Group

=== 2010s ===
- 2011
  - 17 November: Children in Need Rocks Manchester charity music concert is held at the Manchester Arena
  - The Ritz is taken over by HMV and given a £2 million refurbishment
- 2013
  - 3 April: Blossoms play for first time at the Night and Day Cafe, Oldham Street, Manchester
- 2015
  - The Ritz is acquired by Live Nation Entertainment and re-branded as O_{2} Ritz Manchester
- 2016
  - I Am Kloot disband
- 2017
  - 22 May: Manchester Arena bombing: A Manchester-born suicide bomber kills 22 as young people leave an Ariana Grande concert at the Manchester Arena
- 2019
  - 4-21 July: Manchester International Festival, including Laurie Anderson, Philip Glass, Abida Parveen and Skepta.

=== 2020s ===
- 2021
  - 10 September: New Order play at Heaton Park, Manchester
  - The Chameleons are re-formed again
- 2022
  - 11 June: The Killers play at the Old Trafford Cricket Ground, supported by Blossoms

== Music in Manchester - births and deaths ==
- Gem Archer (b.1966, Durham - The Edge, The Contenders, Whirlpool, Heavy Stereo, Oasis, Beady Eye, High Flying Birds
- John Barbirolli (b.1899, London) (d.1970, London) - The Hallé
- Andy Bell (b.1970, Cardiff) - Ride, Hurricane #1, Oasis, Beady Eye
- Bez (b.1964, Salford) - Happy Mondays, Black Grape
- Tim Booth (b.1960, Bradford) - James
- Mark Burgess (b.1960, Manchester) - The Chameleons, Black Swan Lane, ChameleonsVox
- Bernie Calvert (b.1942, Brierfield) - Ricky Shaw and the Dolphins, The Hollies
- Allan Clarke (b.1942, Salford) - The Fourtones, The Hollies
- John Cooper Clarke (b.1949, Salford)
- Lol Creme (b.1947, Prestwich) - 10cc, Godley & Creme, Art of Noise
- Ian Curtis (b.1956, Stretford) (d.1980, Macclesfield) - Warsaw, Joy Division
- Howard Devoto (b.1952, Scunthorpe) - Buzzcocks, Magazine
- Bobby Elliott (b.1941, Burnley) - Shane Fenton and the Fentones, The Hollies
- Alan Erasmus (b.1949, Manchester)
- Georgie Fame (b.1943, Leigh) - Georgie Fame and the Blue Flames
- Wayne Fontana (b.1945, Levenshulme) (d.2020, Stockport) - Wayne Fontana and the Mindbenders
- Liam Fray (b.1985, Middleton) - Courteeners
- Liam Gallagher (b.1972, Longsight) - Oasis, Beady Eye
- Noel Gallagher (b.1967, Longsight) - Oasis, High Flying Birds
- Freddie Garrity (b.1936, Crumpsall) (d.2006, Bangor) - Freddie and the Dreamers
- Gillian Gilbert (b.1961, Whalley Range, Manchester) - New Order
- Jim Glennie (b.1963, Moss Side) - James
- Kevin Godley (b.1945, Prestwich) - 10cc, Godley & Creme
- Jimi Goodwin (b.1970, Manchester) - Sub Sub, Doves
- Graham Gouldman (b.1946, Salford) - 10cc
- Rob Gretton (b.1953, Wythenshawe) (d.1999)
- Charles Hallé (b.1819, Hagen) (d.1895, Manchester) - The Hallé
- Martin Hannett (b.1948, Manchester) (d.1991, Manchester)
- Eric Haydock (b.1943, Stockport) (d.2019) - The Hollies
- Tony Hicks (b.1945, Nelson) - Ricky Shaw and the Dolphins, The Hollies
- Peter Hook (b.1956, Broughton, Salford) - Warsaw, Joy Division, New Order, Revenge, Monaco, Peter Hook and the Light
- Davy Jones (b. 1945, Longsight) (d. 2012) The Monkees
- Mike Joyce (b.1963, Fallowfield) - The Smiths
- CP Lee (b.1950, Didsbury) (d.2020) - Greasy Bear, Alberto y Lost Trios Paranoias
- Harvey Lisberg (b.1940, Manchester)
- Ewan MacColl (b.1915, Salford) (d.1989, London)
- Maria Malibran (b.1808, Paris) (d.1836, Manchester)
- Johnny Marr (b.1963, Manchester) - The Smiths, The The, Electronic, Modest Mouse, The Cribs
- John Mayall (b.1933, Macclesfield) - John Mayall & the Bluesbreakers
- John McGeoch (b.1955, Greenock) (d.2004, Launceston) - Magazine, Visage, Siouxsie and the Banshees, The Armoury Show, Public Image Ltd
- Bruce Mitchell (b.1940, Didsbury) - Greasy Bear, Alberto y Lost Trios Paranoias, The Durutti Column
- Stephen Morris (b.1957, Macclesfield) - Warsaw, Joy Division, New Order
- Morrissey (b.1959, Old Trafford) - The Nosebleeds, The Smiths
- Graham Nash (b.1942, Blackpool) - The Fourtones, The Hollies, Crosby, Stills, Nash & Young
- Peter Noone (b.1947, Davyhulme) - Herman's Hermits
- Mike Pickering (b.1954, Manchester) - Quando Quango, M People
- Vini Reilly (b.1953, Blackley) - Ed Banger and the Nosebleeds, The Durutti Column
- Lou Rhodes (b.1964, Manchester) - Lamb
- Hans Richter (b.1843, Raab) (d.1916, Bayreuth) - The Hallé
- John Robb (b.1961, Fleetwood) - The Membranes, Goldblade
- Andy Rourke (b.1964, Manchester) - The Smiths, Freebass
- Rowetta (b.1966, Manchester) - Happy Mondays
- Paul Ryder (b.1964, Little Hulton) (d.2022) - Happy Mondays, Big Arm
- Shaun Ryder (b.1962, Little Hulton) - Happy Mondays, Black Grape
- Pete Shelley (b.1955, Leigh) (d.2018, Tallinn) - Buzzcocks
- Lisa Stansfield (b.1966, Manchester) -Blue Zone
- Vic Steele (b.1945, Manchester) - Emperors of Rhythm, The Hollies
- Eric Stewart (b.1945, Droylsden) - Emperors of Rhythm, Wayne Fontana and the Mindbenders, 10cc
- Bernard Sumner (b.1956, Broughton, Salford) - Warsaw, Joy Division, New Order, Electronic, Bad Lieutenant
- Terry Sylvester (b.1947, Allerton) - The Escorts, The Swinging Blue Jeans, The Hollies
- Andy Williams (b.1970, Manchester) - Sub Sub, Doves, Black Rivers
- Jez Williams (b.1970, Manchester) - Sub Sub, Doves, Black Rivers
- Tony Wilson (b.1950, Pendleton) (d.2007, Withington)
- Paul Young (b.1947, Benchill) (d.2000, Hale) - The Toggery Five, Gyro, Sad Café, Mike and the Mechanics

== Sources ==
- Curtis, Deborah (2007). Touching from a Distance. London: Faber & Faber. ISBN 978-0-571-23956-6.
- Gatenby, Phill; Gill, Craig (2011). The Manchester Musical History Tour. Manchester: Empire Publications. ISBN 9781901746716.
- Gimarc, George (2005). Punk Diary: The Ultimate Trainspotter's Guide to Underground Rock 1970–1982. Milwaukee: Backbeat Books. ISBN 0-8793-0848-6.
- Glinert, Ed (2009). The Manchester Compendium. London: Penguin Books. ISBN 978-0-141-02930-6.
- Kennedy, Jake (2006). Joy Division and the making of Unknown Pleasures. London: Unanimous Ltd. ISBN 1-903318-80-7.
- Middles, Mick (2002). From Joy Division to New Order. London: Virgin Books. ISBN 978-0-7535-0638-7.
- Robb, John (2010). The North Will Rise Again. Manchester Music City (1977-1996). London: Aurum Press. ISBN 978-1-84513-534-8.
