= List of 1970s punk rock musicians =

This is a list of notable first wave punk rock musicians (1971–1979).

== 0-9 ==
- 4 Skins
- 45 Grave
- 999

== A ==
- Abrasive Wheels
- Adam & the Ants
- The Adicts
- Adolescents
- The Adverts
- Agent Orange
- Alex Harvey
- The Alley Cats (Los Angeles)
- Alternative TV
- Amazorblades
- Amebix
- Angelic Upstarts
- Angry Samoans
- Anti-Nowhere League
- Anti-Pasti
- Art Attacks
- Au Pairs
- The Avengers

== B ==
- The B-52s
- Bad Brains
- Bags
- Big Balls and the Great White Idiot
- Big Boys
- Big in Japan
- Black Flag
- Black Randy and the Metrosquad
- Blitzkrieg Bop
- The Blockheads
- Blondie
- The Boomtown Rats
- The Boys
- Bush Tetras
- The Business
- Buzzcocks

== C ==
- Catholic Discipline
- Cardiac Kidz
- Channel 3
- Charged GBH
- Chelsea
- The Cheifs
- Cherry Vanilla
- China White
- Christian Death
- Chrome
- Chron Gen
- Circle Jerks
- Circus Mort
- The Clash
- Cock Sparrer
- Cockney Rejects
- James Chance and the Contortions
- The Controllers
- The Cortinas
- The Cramps
- Crass
- Crime
- Crime & the City Solution

== D ==
- The Damned
- Darby Crash
- The Dead Boys
- Dead Kennedys
- Death
- Defunkt
- Descendents
- Desperate Bicycles
- Devo
- The Dickies
- The Dictators
- The Dils
- The Diodes
- Discharge
- Disorder
- DMZ
- DNA
- D.O.A.
- The Dogs
- Destroy All Monsters
- The Drones
- Ian Dury

== E ==
- The East Coast Angels
- Eater
- Ebba Grön
- Eddie and the Hot Rods
- The Electric Eels
- Elton Motello
- Elvis Costello and the Attractions
- The Exploited

== F ==
- The Fall
- Fang
- Fatal Microbes
- The Fast
- Fastbacks
- Fear
- The Feederz
- Flamin' Groovies
- The Flesh Eaters
- The Fleshtones
- The Flowers of Romance
- Flyboys
- Forgotten Rebels
- Flipper
- The Flys (UK band)
- The Freeze

== G ==
- Gang of Four
- Generation X
- The Germs
- GG Allin
- The Go-Gos
- The Gun Club

== H ==
- The Heartbreakers
- Hüsker Dü

== I ==
- Iggy Pop
- The Innocents

== J ==
- The Jam
- Jayne County
- The Jerks
- Joan Jett
- Johnny Moped

== K ==
- The Kids (Belgian band)
- The Killjoys
- Kommunity FK
- KSMB

== L ==
- Leisure Class
- LiLiPUT
- London
- London SS
- The Lurkers
- The Last
- Lydia Lunch

== M ==
- Magazine
- The Mau Maus
- MC5
- The Mekons
- The Mentally Ill
- The Members
- The Membranes
- Mentors
- Métal Urbain
- MDC
- Middle Class
- Milk 'N' Cookies
- Mink DeVille
- Minutemen
- Misfits
- Misspent Youth (band)
- Mission of Burma
- The Modern Lovers
- Jon Moss
- The Mutants

== N ==
- Necros
- Negative Trend
- Neo
- Neon Boys
- Neon Hearts
- Nervous Gender
- The New Order (band)
- New York Dolls
- Nina Hagen Band
- The Nipple Erectors
- The Now
- The Nosebleeds
- The Nuns

== O ==
- The Offs
- The Only Ones
- The Outcasts
- The Outsiders

== P ==
- The Pagans
- Patti Smith
- The Partisans
- Pere Ubu
- Penetration
- Peter and the Test Tube Babies
- The Plague
- Plasmatics
- Poison Idea
- Poison Girls
- The Police
- Pork Dukes
- The Prefects
- Public Image Ltd
- Punishment of Luxury
- Pure Hell
- The Punks
- Pylon

== Q ==
- ? and the Mysterians

== R ==
- Radio Birdman
- Radio Stars
- Ramones
- The Reactionaries
- Really Red
- The Replacements
- The Rezillos
- Rhino 39
- Riff Regan
- Rikki and the Last Days of Earth
- Rocket from the Tombs
- The Ruts
- The Radiators from Space
- The Runaways

== S ==
- The Saints
- Scars
- The Screamers
- Sex Pistols
- Sham 69
- The Shapes
- Shattered Faith
- The Shirts
- Siouxsie and the Banshees
- The Sillies
- Skids
- Skrewdriver
- The Skulls
- Slaughter & The Dogs
- The Slits
- Sniper
- Social Distortion
- Sonic's Rendezvous Band
- The Specials
- Special Duties
- The Spitfire Boys
- Spizzenergi
- Splodgenessabounds
- SS (Japanese band)
- Steve Bjorklund
- Stiff Little Fingers
- Stinky Toys
- The Stooges
- The Stranglers
- Subhumans (UK)
- Subhumans (Canada)
- Suburban Lawns
- Suburban Studs
- Subway Sect
- Suicide
- The Suicide Commandos
- Swell Maps

== T ==
- T.S.O.L.
- The Table
- Teenage Head
- Teenage Jesus and the Jerks
- The Teen Idles
- Television
- Talking Heads
- Toy Dolls
- Toxic Reasons
- The Tubes
- Tubeway Army
- Tuff Darts
- Tuxedomoon

== U ==
- U.K. Subs
- The Undertones
- Ultravox
- Urinals

== V ==
- The Vandals
- The Varukers
- Venus and the Razorblades
- The Vibrators
- Vice Squad
- The Viletones
- Void
- (Richard Hell and) the Voidoids
- VOM

== W ==
- Wayne County & the Electric Chairs
- The Weirdos
- Wipers
- Wire

== X ==
- X (American band)
- X (Australia)
- XTC
- X-Ray Spex

== Z ==
- The Zeros (UK)
- The Zeros (US)
- Zolar X
- Zounds
