= The Punk Rock Movie =

1978 film by Don Letts

- Directed by: Don Letts
- Starring: John Lydon; Sid Vicious; Soo Catwoman
- Cinematography: Don Letts
- Release date: June 9, 1978
- Country: United Kingdom
- Language: English

The Punk Rock Movie (also known as The Punk Rock Movie from England) is a British 1978 film that was assembled from Super 8 camera footage shot by Don Letts, the disc jockey at The Roxy club during the early days of the UK punk rock movement, principally during the 100 days in 1977 in which punk acts were featured at The Roxy club in London.

== History ==
The spikiest home movie of the Seventies captured an embryonic rock revolution. ...Verité rock had become verité celluloid almost by accident.

Roxy club disc jockey Don Letts was given a Super 8 camera as a present by fashion editor Caroline Baker. When Letts started to film the acts at The Roxy, it was soon reported that he was making a movie, so Letts determined to film continuously for three months. He needed to sell his possessions in order to continue to purchase film.

A preliminary, 60-minute version of the film was shown in autumn of 1977 at the Institute of Contemporary Arts in London. This resulted in the cover story, "Punk Home Movies" in Time Out magazine.

The film features live footage of The Clash, Sex Pistols, Wayne County & the Electric Chairs, Generation X, Slaughter and the Dogs, The Slits, Siouxsie and the Banshees, Eater, Subway Sect, X-Ray Spex, Alternative TV and Johnny Thunders and The Heartbreakers. Backstage footage of certain bands, such as Generation X, The Slits and Siouxsie and the Banshees, is also included.

All live footage was shot at the Roxy, except that of the Sex Pistols, who were filmed at The Screen On The Green cinema in London on 3 April 1977. The performance was Sid Vicious' first public concert with the band.

The film was subject to limited theatrical release in 1978. It was also subject to limited video release at that time by Sun Video (1978) and Danton Video (1980). It was also released on video in 1992 by Studio K7. Versions of the film were released on DVD between 2006 and 2008, though these releases were subject to criticism for sound reproduction and digital transfers that were considered to be inferior to the original. In addition, concerns were expressed that the soundtrack now included overdubbed material, as opposed to the original live recordings.

== Segments (of 1987 VHS) ==
- Sex Pistols - God Save The Queen [Live] (2:12)
- Shane MacGowan of The Nipple Erectors dancing to the Clash - White Riot [single] (2:01)
- Eater backstage (0:56 length)
- Slaughter and the Dogs - Cranked Up Really High [Live] (2:50)
- Backstage with Generation X rehearsing "Listen" a cappella (1:02)
- Generation X - Walking In The City [Live] (2:04)
- Generation X - Kleenex [Live] (1:08)
- Unidentified woman in studio playing guitar
- Crystal Clear (Rebecca Hale) takes snaps of The Slits practicing (1:56)
- Ari Up & Joe Strummer on bus listening to Joe Gibbs & Professionals - "Jubilation Dub" (1:19)
- The Clash - White Riot [Live] (1:38)
- The Clash goof off while the tour bus is repaired (1:38)
- The Clash - Garageland [Live] (0:58)
- Topper Headon & Ari Up on bus (unknown Reggae plays) (0:23)
- The Slits - Vaseline [Live] (2:13)
- Paul Simonon, Joe Strummer & Ari Up mess about on bus - which is pulled by Police (to unknown Reggae) (0:37)
- Subway Sect - Why Don't You Shoot Me [Live] (2:40)
- Alternative TV - working up song in studio (1:31)
- Police busting punk shop Boy for window display [to reggae song King Tubby Meets Rockers Uptown by Augustus Pablo and King Tubby.] (2:02)
- Wayne County & the Electric Chairs - F*** Off [Live] (1:10)
- Soo Catwoman interviewed [to unknown Reggae] (0:26)
- Wayne County & the Electric Chairs - F*** Off [Live] continued (0:30)
- Wayne County & the Electric Chairs - Cream In My Jeans [Live] (2:18)
- Police busting punk shop Boy for window display [to reggae song King Tubby Meets Rockers Uptown by Augustus Pablo and King Tubby.] continued (0:48)
- Wayne County & the Electric Chairs - end of unknown song [Live] (0:24)
- Alternative TV - working up song in studio continued (0:55)
- Eater backstage (0:27)
- Eater - No Brains [Live] (3:30)
- Siouxsie and the Banshees - Bad Shape [Live] (2:20)
- The Slits - New Town (2:44)
- Alternative TV - working up song in studio continued (1:05)
- Johnny Thunders and The Heartbreakers - Chinese Rocks [Live] (2:34)
- Siouxsie and the Banshees backstage taking pills (1:24)
- The Heartbreakers and The Banshees on bus (1:03)
- The Heartbreakers backstage (0:28)
- Johnny Thunders and The Heartbreakers - Born To Lose [Live] (2:38)
- The Heartbreakers and The Banshees on the bus with Don Letts (0:46)
- Siouxsie backstage doing her makeup (0:49)
- Siouxsie and the Banshees - Carcass [Live] (The Story Of A Man Who Has An Impaled Affair With A Carcass) (3:08)
- Siouxsie backstage with vodka (0:10)
- The Clash - 1977 [Live] (1:25)
- Soo Catwoman interview continued (0:41)
- Punk girl interviewed to The Saints - I'm Stranded (0:46)
- X-Ray Spex - Oh Bondage! (1:49)
- Siouxsie and the Banshees backstage (0:54)
- Johnny Thunders and The Heartbreakers - Chinese Rocks [Live] (1:22)
- Siouxsie and the Banshees backstage (0:15)
- Sex Pistols - Lazy Sod (1:49)
- Sex Pistols - Liar (1:45)
- Sex Pistols - Pretty Vacant (0:35)
- Sex Pistols - New York (2:00)
- Sex Pistols - God Save The Queen (3:07)
- Johnny Rotten in Jamaica destroying a children's record player (1:35)
