= Sex Pistols at the Lesser Free Trade Hall =

Sex Pistols' Manchester performances in 1976

- Concert by Sex Pistols
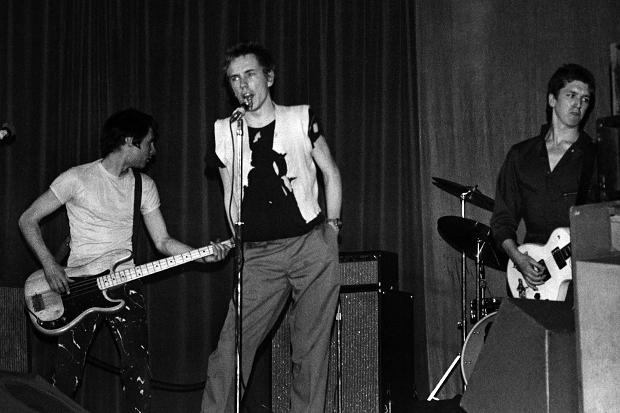
- Venue: Lesser Free Trade Hall, Manchester
- Dates: 4 June 1976 and 20 July 1976
- Duration: 60 minutes (June 4, 1976)

Sex Pistols concert chronology
- Sex Pistols Live at the 100 Club; Sex Pistols Live at the Lesser Free Trade Hall; Sex Pistols Live at the Screen on the Green

On 4 June and 20 July 1976, English punk rock band the Sex Pistols performed two concerts at the Lesser Free Trade Hall in Manchester, England. The shows were organised by local punk enthusiasts Howard Devoto and Pete Shelley, who had formed the Buzzcocks in February that year after witnessing the Sex Pistols perform. The June performance was supported by the Bolton group Solstice, filmed by Mark Roberts, photographed by Paul Welsh and fully recorded on audio tape by Dave Eyre. Neal Holden provided lighting for the event. The second performance in July was supported by the Buzzcocks and Slaughter & the Dogs and photographed by Al McDonell.

Among the audience were future members of Joy Division (and New Order), the Smiths, the Fall, Simply Red, Magazine, Crispy Ambulance and Buzzcocks, who cited the performances as being the primary inspiration of their musical careers. Other attendees included Martin Hannett, Tony Wilson and Alan McGee, who cited the gig as inspiring their launch of influential independent record labels such as Factory and Creation Records. Sounds journalist Jonh Ingham, punk poet John Cooper Clarke, singer Jon the Postman and writer Paul Morley, who later worked for music magazine NME, were also in attendance. In 2001, writer David Nolan produced a TV documentary about the performance titled "I Swear I Was There" which was followed by a book in 2006 titled I Swear I Was There: The Gig That Changed the World. The show was depicted in the opening scene of the 2002 film 24 Hour Party People.

Although the shows were attended by only a small crowd, they are regarded as a pivotal moment in Manchester's alternative music history, as well as instrumental in the development of British post-punk, DIY music and indie rock. In 2021, Mark Roberts' original Super 8mm film which captured the 4 June Manchester show, was sold at an auction for £15,000. Additionally, the 4 June 1976 performance has been described by the NME as "the most important concert of all time".

== Background ==
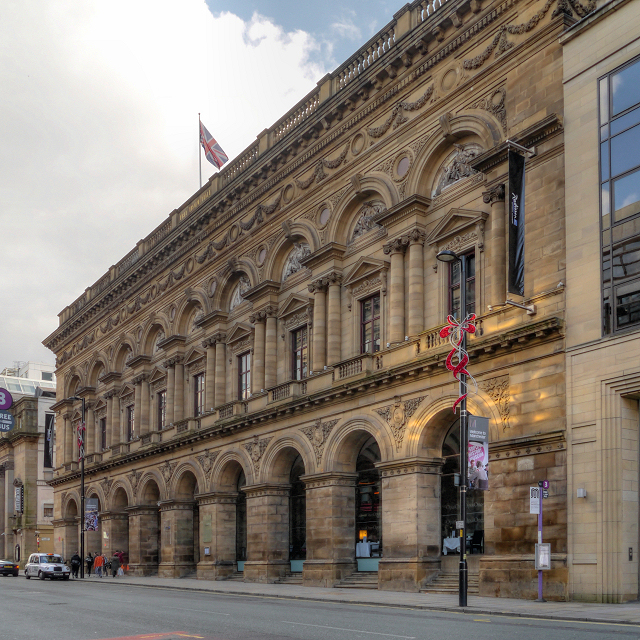
The façade of the Free Trade Hall

On 21 February 1976, the Sex Pistols first print review appeared in the NME, accompanied by a brief interview in which Steve Jones declared, "Actually we're not into music. We're into chaos." Among those who read the article were two students at the Bolton Institute of Technology, Howard Devoto and Pete Shelley, who headed down to London in search of the Sex Pistols. After chatting with Malcolm McLaren at Sex, they saw the band at a couple of gigs in late February. The two friends began organising their own punk rock group, the Buzzcocks. As Devoto put it, "My life changed the moment that I saw the Sex Pistols."

Subsequently, Devoto and Shelley organised a concert for the Sex Pistols to perform at the Lesser Free Trade Hall in central Manchester. The gig was arranged in part because Manchester lacked a dedicated punk venue, with the pair leveraging their local connections to secure the hall for the performance. The Manchester show marked the Sex Pistols' first concert outside London, with their previous performances taking place at the Marquee Club and the 100 Club, which often drew controversy due to their confrontational and chaotic onstage persona.

== Performance and attendance ==
The 4 June 1976 concert was supported by a Bolton group known as Solstice. The show has been estimated to have been attended by a small crowd of around 30 to 50 people. Among them were future members of Joy Division and New Order (Peter Hook and Bernard Sumner), the Smiths (Morrissey), Martin Hannett (Factory Records producer), John Cooper Clarke, Jon the Postman, Buzzcocks and Magazine (Howard Devoto, Steve Diggle and Pete Shelley) and Simply Red (Mick Hucknall). These artists later cited the performance as primarily kickstarting their musical careers, as well as their involvement in the punk rock scene.

The original audio tape for the 4 June 1976 show was recorded by Dave Eyre, with Neal Holden providing lighting and Eyre operating as a sound man for the event. Both performances were filmed by Mark Roberts and photographed by Paul Welsh. The Buzzcocks were supposed to open for the Pistols but could not get a bass player in time, though would meet Manchester bassist Steve Diggle at the performance.

On 20 July 1976, the Sex Pistols returned to Manchester's Lesser Free Trade Hall to perform a second gig, they presented the song, "Anarchy in the U.K." for the first time live and were supported by Slaughter & the Dogs and Buzzcocks. Ian Curtis was in attendance and met Peter Hook, Bernard Sumner, and Terry Mason, who had previously noticed him attending shows at Manchester's Electric Circus. The group went on to form the band Warsaw which later became Joy Division.

Others present at the July show included further future members of Manchester's alternative music scene such as Mark E. Smith (the Fall), Alan McGee (Founder of Creation Records), Paul Morley, (who later became a writer for NME), Alan Hempsall (later formed Crispy Ambulance), Jonh Ingham (Writer for Sounds) and Tony Wilson (Granada Television presenter and founder of Factory Records). Wilson remarked:

[...] there was no pogoing. Pogo really hadn't been invented at that point. The people who were there were just sitting, sitting in these chairs just... gob smacked. I became involved and thought it was a good idea. It's like a Boogie Nights concept. The dawn of punk to the death of acid, taking you through two revolutions on their up and down cycles.

The 20 July 1976 show marked the Buzzcocks first live performance, where they played songs such as "Breakdown", "Time's Up", "Oh Shit" and "I Don't Mind" which appeared on their debut EP Spiral Scratch and album Another Music in a Different Kitchen. They performed a cover of Captain Beefheart's "I Love You, You Big Dummy", which was covered by lead singer Howard Devoto's post-punk band Magazine. Devoto and Shelley were present at both June and July shows.

== Critical reception ==
On 31 July 1976, music journalist Jonh Ingham reviewed the 20 July concert for Sounds, where he stated the Sex Pistols' performance at the Free Trade Hall had sullied the "fifties atmosphere" and that Buzzcocks frontman Howard Devoto sounded "a lot like Johnny Rotten" while comparing the rest of the band to the Sex Pistols, and stating that apart from "more gigs", the only thing the Buzzcocks needed was a "hell of a lot more volume". Ingham described the Sex Pistol's set:

WHILE EQUIPMENT was changed the capacity audience posed. The David Bowie lookalikes all had the distinct advantage of looking like their skinny hero, perhaps the benefit of plastic surgery. There was a profusion of Neanderthals in stringy hair and leather, one of whom dug the Pistols by bellowing "Stooges!" and pounding seats to oblivion.

According to Ingham, the show's sound stage was not properly arranged, he stated: "Unfortunately, the PA was more expectation than actuality, the Pistols sounds man having to patch together a mismatched jumble of amps to gain results. Under the circumstances, it's a wonder the sound was as good as it was." The review concluded with Ingham stating:

At John's [Lydon] encouragement the front pidly filled with wildly boppin people. One enthusiastic couple pushed each other back and forth in time to the express train rhythm, and God help anyone in the way. By the time "Problems" had blasted to a close the joint was screaming. For an encore, John tore up his shirt.

In regards to an audience member, he wrote, "one trend setter sported a high-class homemade Sex Pistols t-shirt".

== Set list ==
Live '76 (2016)

Live album by Sex Pistols
- Released: 19 August 2016
- Recorded: 4 June 1976 – 24 September 1976
- Studio: Wessex Sound Studios
- Genre: Punk rock
- Length: 48:42
- Label: Universal UMC
- Producer: Chris Thomas
- Compiler: Chris Thomas

Sex Pistols chronology
| Sex Pistols Live (2007) | Live '76 (2016) (2016) | Live in the U.S.A.: South East Music Hall, Atlanta (January 5th, 1978) (2025) |

On 4 June 1976, the Sex Pistols were supported by Bolton band Solstice who also performed their own set list. The Sex Pistols' set list consisted of nine songs that appeared on their debut album Never Mind the Bollocks, Here's the Sex Pistols; alongside four covers originally performed by bands such as the Stooges, the Who and the Small Faces. The only show to be recorded on tape was the 4 June show by sound man Dave Eyre. At the July show the Sex Pistols performed songs such as "I'm A Lazy Sod".

In August 1977, an edited version of the 4 June 1976 Manchester good audience recording (missing "Submission", "Satellite", "No Feelings" and the first performance of "No Fun") was released on the bootleg live album No Fun. On 19 August, 2016, the first official release of the performance, albeit taken from a downgraded source and missing the second performance of "No Fun", was included in the album Live '76 which featured some of the recorded Sex Pistols live performances from 1976 and was put on the label Universal UMC.

=== Track listing ===
The set list for the 4 June 1976 show included 14 songs, for a total duration of 57:34.

| No. | Title | Writer(s) | Length |
|---|---|---|---|
| 1. | "Did You No Wrong" | | 3:36 |
| 2. | "Don't Gimme No Lip Child" | Donald Thomas, Jean Thomas, Barry Richards | 3:40 |
| 3. | "Seventeen" | | 2:18 |
| 4. | "(I'm Not Your) Stepping Stone" | Tommy Boyce, Bobby Hart | 3:13 |
| 5. | "New York" | | 3:20 |
| 6. | "Whatcha Gonna Do About It" | Ian Samwell, Brian Potter, Steve Marriott, Ronnie Lane | 4.00 |
| 7. | "Submission" | | 3:55 |
| 8. | "Satellite" | | 4:07 |
| 9. | "No Feelings" | | 2:45 |
| 10. | "No Fun" | The Stooges | 5:13 |
| 11. | "Substitute" | Pete Townshend | 3:19 |
| 12. | "Pretty Vacant" | | 4:38 |
| 13. | "Problems" | | 7:44 |
| 14. | "No Fun" | | 5:39 |

== Legacy ==
The Sex Pistols 4 June 1976 gig at the Lesser Free Trade Hall has been described by the NME as being "the most important concert of all time", while the BBC labelled it "one of the most influential gigs of all time". The concert has been cited as responsible for setting the punk rock boom in Northern England. The show inspired Manchester's later alternative music scene, which contributed to the development of the British independent music scene in the 1980s, as well as the development of post-punk, DIY music and indie rock.

The show has been compared to other influential concerts, such as the 1964 performance of the Beatles on The Ed Sullivan Show, Bob Dylan's 1965 "Electric Dylan controversy" at the Newport Folk Festival, and Jimi Hendrix's 1969 performance at Woodstock.

A 17-year-old Morrissey present at the show wrote to the NME saying he would "love to see the Pistols make it".

Additionally, the shows inspired those who attended who were either not previously musically inclined or who had only a slight interest in rock to form bands and create music, or to contribute to the local punk music scene through independent labels and punk zines.

In 2001, writer David Nolan produced the TV documentary on the performance titled I Swear I Was There. It was followed by a book titled I Swear I Was There: The Gig That Changed the World. Nolan stated:

[...] it's one of those moments in popular culture whereby you can put your finger on it and say: that was it, that was the day, that was the time, that was the year that was the precise moment when everything took a left turn. And that is the music that we’re listening to now, the clubs we have in Manchester, the way we buy records, the independent music scene, basically came out of that audience.

In 2002, the 4 June 1976 performance was depicted in the film 24 Hour Party People by director Michael Winterbottom.

In 2016, Mark Roberts' original Super 8mm film that captured the Sex Pistols 4 June 1976 performance was briefly featured in an anniversary artwork exhibition at Tyneside Cinema. In 2021, the original film was sold at an auction for £15,000.

In 2026, the 4th June concert featured predominantly in Gigging, the debut novel by Manchester based writer and DJ Mick Beatle

== Personnel ==
=== Sex Pistols ===
- Johnny Rotten – lead vocals
- Steve Jones – backing vocals, rhythm and lead guitar
- Glen Matlock – backing vocals, bass guitar
- Paul Cook – drums

=== Solstice ===
Supporting act on 4 June 1976.

- Kimble – lead vocals
- Paul Flintoff – bass guitar
- Geoff Wild – guitar
- Dave 'Zok' Howard – keyboards
- Harry Box – drums

=== Buzzcocks ===
Supporting act on 20 July 1976.

- Howard Devoto – lead vocals
- Pete Shelley – backing vocals, rhythm and lead guitar
- Steve Diggle – backing vocals, bass guitar
- John Maher – drums

=== Slaughter & the Dogs ===
Supporting act on 20 July 1976.

- Wayne Barrett – lead vocals
- Mick Rossi – rhythm guitar
- Howard Bates – bass guitar
- Mike Day – lead guitar
- Brian Grantham – drums

=== Additional personnel ===
- Neal Holden – lighting
- Dave Eyre – sound engineer

== See also ==
- Popular music of Manchester
- Timeline of music in Manchester

== Bibliography ==
- Albiez, Sean (2006). "Print the Truth, Not the Legend. The Sex Pistols: Lesser Free Trade Hall, Manchester, 4 June 1976". In Inglis, Ian (ed.). Performance and Popular Music: History, Place and Time. Ashgate. ISBN 0-7546-4057-4.
- Ingham, Jonh (31 July 1976). "Sex Pistols/Buzzcocks—Lesser Free Trade Hall, Manchester". Sounds. Jonh Ingham—My Back Pages. Archived from the original on 1 June 2008.
- Morley, Paul (21 May 2006). "A Northern Soul". Observer Music Monthly. London. Archived from the original on 2 October 2006.
- Savage, Jon (1992). England's Dreaming. Faber & Faber. ISBN 978-0-57136-854-9.
- Robb, John (2006). Punk Rock: An Oral History. Random House. ISBN 978-1-40903-436-0.
