= Electric Circus (disambiguation) =

Electric Circus is a Canadian television program.

Electric Circus or The Electric Circus may also refer to:

- Electric Circus (album), by the rapper Common
- Electric Circus (nightclub), a nightclub in Manhattan
- Electric Circus, Manchester, a punk rock venue in 1970s
- "Electric Circus", a song by Thee Michelle Gun Elephant
- "Electric Circus", a song by Bad Suns from the 2022 album Apocalypse Whenever
- Electric Circus, an entertainment segment running on BBC children's Saturday morning show Live & Kicking

== See also ==
- Inside the Electric Circus, a 1986 album by W.A.S.P.
