= Sorted (The Drones album) =

Studio album by The Drones
- Released: 1999
- Genre: Rock
- Length: 36:30
- Label: Captain Oi!

The Drones chronology
Further Temptations (1977)	Sorted (1999)

Sorted is the second album by The Drones, released in 1999, some 22 years after its predecessor Further Temptations.

== Track listing ==
1. "Sorted" – 3:21
2. "Johnny Go Home" (Remix) – 3:20
3. "Dirty Bastards" – 2:23
4. "Nightman" – 2:33
5. "Psychotic Woman" – 2:57
6. "American Pie" – 3:46
7. "The Phone" – 3:14
8. "Good Girl" – 2:46
9. "I'll Get Back to You" – 3:03
10. "I Don't Care" – 2:53
11. "Jon the Postman" – 2:50
12. "I Heard It Through the Grapevine" – 3:24
