= The Fridge (nightclub) =

Former nightclub in South London, England

Coordinates: 51.4602°N 0.1169°W

The Fridge, Brixton
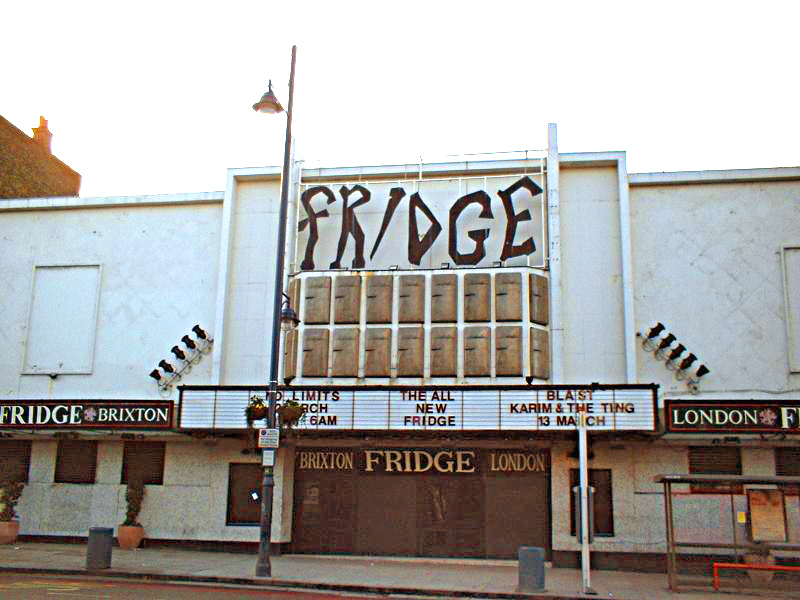
- Interactive map of The Fridge, Brixton
- Location: Brixton, South London, England
- Owner: Aleksandra and Susan Carrington
- Capacity: 1,789
- Type: Nightclub

Construction
- Opened: December 1981

The Fridge was a nightclub in the Brixton area of South London, England, founded, in 1981, by Andrew Czezowski and Susan Carrington, who had run the Roxy during punk music's heyday in 1977. The Fridge closed on 17 March 2010 and has no link with Electric Brixton which opened in September 2011 and now occupies the building.

== History ==
The Fridge started in 1981, in a small club at 390 Brixton Rd, and later, in 1982, above Iceland in Brixton Road with a radical decor that included beat-up ice boxes and artificial dead cats hanging from its ceiling. Early guest DJs included Keith Barker-Main, later a lifestyle journalist and social commentator. It claims to have been the first British club to have such innovations as video screens and a chill out lounge. The Fridge was at the heart of the early 80s New Romantic movement, and booked such acts as Eurythmics and the Pet Shop Boys before they were well known and drew famous faces such as Boy George, Frankie Goes to Hollywood, Magenta Devine, as well as Marc Almond and Grace Jones, who also performed there. Although all the nights at The Fridge welcomed anyone, the Friday nights were aimed primarily at the straight community in contrast to Love Muscle on Saturday nights which was promoted as a gay night.

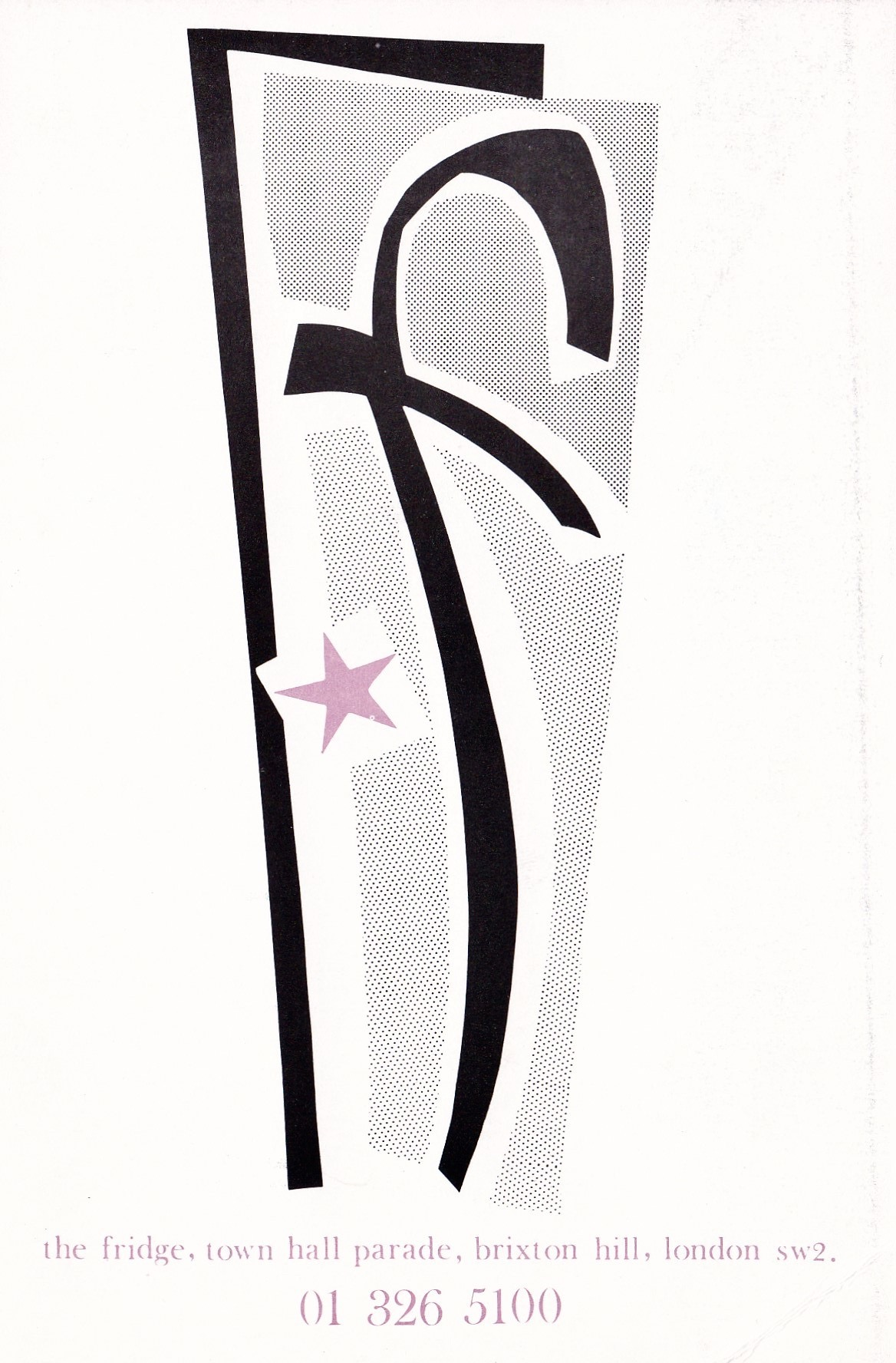
FRIDGE nightclub, Brixton, 1985 invitation card to the opening on Friday 7 June 1985. (pink)

In 1984, as a result of its increased popularity, the owners of the club signed a lease on a converted 1913 cinema (The Palladium Picture House) formerly a roller-disco called the ACE on the Town Hall Parade. After renovating the building, the new Fridge club opened on 7 June 1985. Joe Strummer from The Clash invested £5,000 in the new club. Andrew explains during an interview for 3:AM magazine, "what the club achieved since then -- its visuals laid the template for the rave scene, it's a look that's being copied across the world. There's been no recognition of course -- if a record is influential it's on vinyl for all to hear throughout history, but you can't really encapsulate a visual in the same way, people just take it for granted. Basically the look of modern-day clubs was started here in 1986."

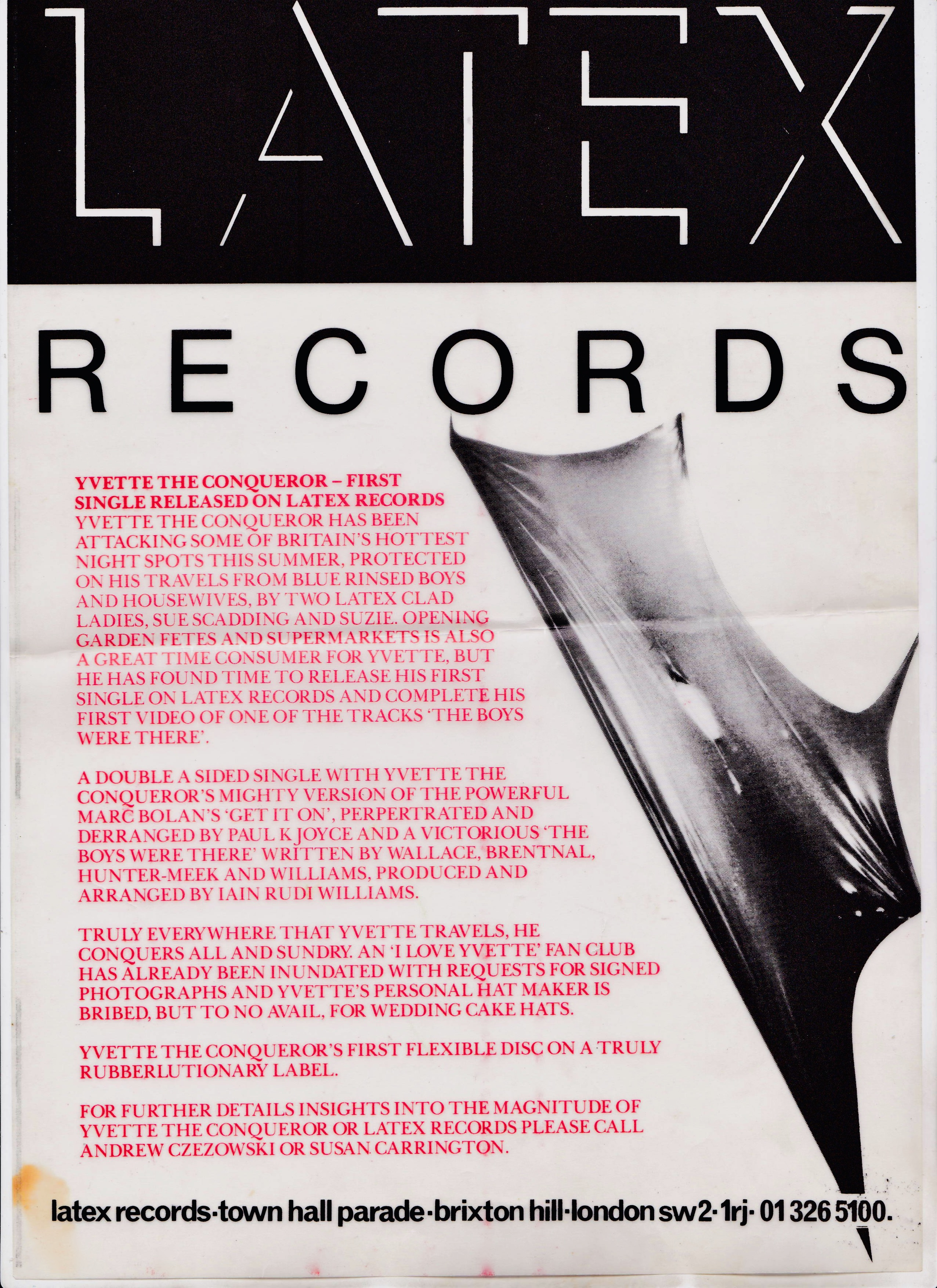
LATEX RECORDS, 1985, Yvette the Conqueror 1st single press release

In July 1985, Czezowski and Carrington launched their own Record Company, Latex Records, located at the Fridge. Yvette the Conqueror was the first artist signed to the label. The label's first release was a single by Yvette the Conqueror, titled "The Boys Were There" produced by Iain 'Rudi' Williams (from the bands You You You and Big Bang). Czezowski and Carrington also promoted many bands at the Fridge, one of which was the cult club-band You You You featuring club promoter Laurence Malice, Karen O'Connor and Iain 'Rudi' Williams. The band performed a sell-out concert at the Fridge on 27 March 1987, at which Czezowski had a huge white staircase built on the stage for the band to perform on. The show was filmed for Japanese television. Since then it has hosted a variety of club nights most notably Soul II Soul (1988 - 1993) Daisy Chain (1987-1990) and Escape From Samsara (1995-2005).

== Club nights ==
Launched in September 1992 by Czezowski and Carrington, Love Muscle became one of the major gay club nights in London, running every Saturday night for almost a decade.

The night was temporarily closed in 1998, but was soon brought back due to public demand. It never fully recovered however, and became increasingly infrequent during the period 2000–2002, then finally closed permanently in 2004.

Love Muscle returned to the Fridge on 31 December 2008 with the original promoter Andrew Czezowski with pyrotechnics and production effects.

Other club nights included a residency from Soul II Soul, Escape From Samsara, and Return To The Source.

== The Fridge Bar ==
The Fridge Bar, located next-door to The Fridge, was typically used to host an afterparty on Saturday mornings, with DJs playing music to the small basement dancefloor. A hand-stamp allowed paying punters to come and go freely, some choosing to spend part of the morning in the Peace Gardens park situated immediately opposite the venue.

== Album releases ==
An embodiment of The Fridge's most revered night Soul II Soul named "At the Africa Centre" for its original venue was released as a compilation album in 2003, mixed by Jazzie B

Escape from Samsara released a total of three unmixed compilation albums between 1996 and 1999. The group Zen Terrorists and solo artist SBL (Silicon Based Life) also both later released Live at Escape from Samsara albums. The second CD of the debut album by Lab 4 consisted of a live set recorded at Escape from Samsara at the Fridge, too.

Return to the Source released a number of compilation albums and a few singles on their label of the same name. Otherworld released a trance compilation entitled Dance, Trance & Magic Plants on the Transient label in 1997.

== Closure ==
The Fridge finally closed on 17 March 2010. The Love Muscle xx website was online until 2014 and played loops of the club's memorable tracks, starting with Bob Sinclar's Save Our Souls.

The venue reopened in 2011 as Electric Brixton. The venue is now owned by Electric Group.

== See also ==
- List of electronic dance music venues
- Superclub
