= Since You Went Away (disambiguation) =

Since You Went Away is a 1944 American film directed by John Cromwell.

Since You Went Away may also refer to:

- "Since You Went Away" (song), by the Monkees
- "Since You Went Away", a song by Slaughter and the Dogs from the album Do It Dog Style
- "Since You Went Away", a song by The Stranglers, single B-side to the album Dreamtime
- "Since You Went Away" (Devious Maids), a 2015 television episode
