= We Don't Care =

We Don't Care may refer to:

- "We Don't Care" (Akon song), 2009
- "We Don't Care" (Sigala song), 2018
- "We Don't Care", a song by Audio Bullys from their debut album Ego War
- "We Don't Care", a song by Kanye West from his album The College Dropout
- "We Don't Care", a song by Børns from his album Blue Madonna
- "We Don't Care", a song by Slaughter and the Dogs from their album Do It Dog Style
- We (Don't) Care, a 2004 demo album by MGMT
