= Johnny Moped =

English punk rock group

Background information
- Origin: Croydon, South London, England
- Genres: Punk rock
- Years active: 1974–1978, 1981, 1992, 2007–2008, 2011–present
- Labels: Chiswick Records, Deltic Damaged Goods Records
- Members: Paul Halford (aka Johnny Moped); Slimey Toad; Jacko Pistorious; Robert Brook (aka Rock and Roll Robot); Martin Parrott (aka Marty Love)
- Past members: Dave Berk; Fred Berk; Ray Burns (aka Captain Sensible); Chrissie Hynde; Xerxes; Edward Turtle

Johnny Moped are an English punk rock group formed in South London in the mid-1970s, who once had Chrissie Hynde (later of the Pretenders) and Captain Sensible (later of the Damned) as members.

== Biography ==
"basically the band was originally known as Genetic Breakdown and consisted me, Johnny, Xerxes, Fred, Captain (Sensible) and Phil (Captain’s brother)." - Dave Berk, 1995

Formed in Croydon in May 1974, the band were initially a proto-punk band.

The original line up was Johnny Moped (Paul Halford), Dave Berk (Dave Batchelor), Fred Berk (Colin Mills), Captain Sensible (Raymond Ian Burns), Phil Burns, and Xerxes (John Skinner). Their second guitarist, Chrissie Hynde, was dismissed.

Initially calling themselves Johnny Moped and the 5 Arrogant Superstars, by August they changed their moniker to Assault and Buggery, then The Commercial Band, then The Black Witch Climax Blues Band, and Genetic Breakdown, before reverting to just Johnny Moped by January 1975.

Johnny Moped became one of the pioneering punk bands that played live in the first few months of London's Roxy Club. They played two gigs in February 1977, one supporting Eater and one backing the Damned. The following month they played two more, one supporting Slaughter & the Dogs and the other backing the Damned. In April, they were on a bill that included Wire, X-Ray Spex and the Buzzcocks and the band also supported Motörhead at The Hammersmith Odeon.

Johnny Moped's "Hard Lovin' Man" appeared on the hit various artists album Live at the Roxy WC2 (Harvest Records, 1977). The band signed with Chiswick Records and released three singles, including "Little Queenie" (a cover of the Chuck Berry song), and one album – Cycledelic – before splitting up. First single "No-One" later featured on the Chiswick various artists sampler album Long Shots, Dead Certs and Odds on Favourites in 1978, while b-side "Incendiary Device" made number 15 in BBC Radio 1 DJ John Peel's 'Festive Fifty', the so-called 'lost list' of 1977.

Sixteen years after its release, the publishers of The Guinness Encyclopedia of Popular Music, named Cycledelic as one of the best fifty punk albums of all time. Most of the band reformed to record a second album The Search For Xerxes in 1991.

A documentary about the band, produced by Fred Burns, the son of Captain Sensible and Rachel Bor of Dolly Mixture, Basically, Johnny Moped, premiered in September 2013.

In 2015, the band, that now featured Rob Brook on second guitar, and long time bassist Jacko Pistorious alongside Johnny, Slimey and Dave, entered the Panther Studios in Surrey, with producer Dick Crippen (original bassist of Tenpole Tudor), to record a new album. The first single to be taken from it was "Ain't No Rock 'n' Roll Rookie" backed with "Super Woofa", which came out on Damaged Goods Records on 31 July 2015 as a limited 7" and download. 2018 saw the band back at Panther Studios with producer Dick Crippen to record their fourth studio album.

== Reviews ==
Johnny Moped's style has been variously described as:

- 'Moronic punk 'n' roll fusing future Chiswick label-mates Motörhead with the manic humour of John Otway’.
- 'They were one of Chiswick’s top bands because they bridged the gap between mid-seventies pub rock and the beery end of punk'.
- Cycledelic was "absolute madness. The greatest songs, the sloppiest playing, a voice to make Billy Bragg feel grateful and the sheer immortality of the since-oft-covered "Darling, Let’s Have Another Baby". Rating: nine out of ten".
- 'Johnny Moped had been about for a few years practising their sonic terrorism in & around Croydon by the time Punk Rock broke. That didn't stop them signing to Chiswick Records & releasing the utterly superb 45 No One (NS 15) & the equally frenetic LP, Cycledelic (Wik 8). Perennially written off by the snobbier elements of the Punk elite, mates of Captain Sensible & part time roadies for the Damned – Johnny Moped had it all'.
- Legends... 'In any discussion of punk's greatest legends the name of Johnny Moped forever looms large – not necessarily for the vitality of their vinyl, although few would deny that the Moped had few peers in that arena. Nor through the brilliant chaos of their live shows, although a good Moped gig could keep you grinning for a week. No, Johnny Moped was a legend because with a reputation and a presentation like theirs, what else could they be?’

The band's single, 'Darling Let's Have Another Baby', features among 'The 12 Greatest Punk Rock Records Ever Made' – a listicle published by Danny Baker on his Patreon blog.

== Discography ==
=== Studio albums ===
- Cycledelic (April 1978), Chiswick Records
- The Search for Xerxes (May 1991), Deltic (Re-issued in 2021 on Damaged Goods)
- It's a Real Cool Baby (25 March 2016), Damaged Goods
- Lurrigate Your Mind (24 May 2019), Damaged Goods
- Quonk! (17 May 2024), Damaged Goods

=== Live albums ===
- Johnny Moped Live in Trafalgar Square (1983) (13 December 2019), Damage Goods

=== Compilations ===
- Basically: The Best of (September 1995), Chiswick
- The Bootleg Tapes: I & II (September 2007), Damaged Goods

=== Compilation appearances (selective) ===
- "Hard Lovin' Man" – The Roxy London WC2 (24 June 1977), Harvest Records – UK No. 24
- "No-One" – Long Shots, Dead Certs and Odds on Favourites (Chiswick Chartbusters Volume Two) (sampler album) (1978), Chiswick Records
- "Incendiary Device" – Pogo A Go Go! (1986), NME magazine

=== Singles ===
- "No One" / "Incendiary Device" (August 1977), Chiswick
- "Darling, Let's Have Another Baby" / "Somethin' Else (song)" / "It Really Digs" (January 1978), Chiswick
- "Little Queenie" / "Hard Lovin' Man" (June 1978), Chiswick
- "Ain't No Rock 'n' Roll Rookie" / "Super Woofa" (July 2015), Damaged Goods
- "Real Cool Baby" / "Never Never Time" (12 February 2016), Damaged Goods
- "Everything Is You" / "Post Apocalyptic Love Song" (April 2016), Damaged Goods
- "Catatonic" / "Hard Lovin' Man" (18 August 2017), Damaged Goods
- "Motorhead" / "City Kids" (September 2018), Damaged Goods
- "Living in a Dream World" / "Save the Baby Seals" (April 2019), Damaged Goods
- "Hey Belinda" / "Hiawatha" (23 August 2019), Damaged Goods
- "Lockdown Boy" / "The Other Side" (November 2023), Damaged Goods
- "Things May Happen" / "Don't waste my time" ( 10 May 2024) Damaged Goods

== See also ==
- List of punk bands from the United Kingdom
- List of 1970s punk rock musicians
- Music of the United Kingdom (1970s)
