= Blitzkrieg Bop (band) =

English punk rock band

- Origin: Teesside, England, UK
- Genre: Punk rock
- Years active: 1977–1979, 1994, 1999
- Past members: Blank Frank (John Hodgson); Ray Gunn (Ray Radford); Bert Presley (Micky Dunn); Kid Moses (Graeme Moses); Nicky Noxx (Alan Cornfroth); Telly Sett (Damian Blackwell); Gloria (Anne Hodgson); Mick Sick (Mick Hylton)

Blitzkrieg Bop were an English punk rock band formed in Teesside, England in February 1977. They were named after a song by the Ramones with the same name. They released three singles. These were "Let's Go"/ "Bugger Off" / "9 Till 5" (Mortonsound – June 1977); "Let's Go" (re-recorded) / "Life Is Just A So-So" / "Mental Case" (Lightning – December 1977); and "(You're Like A) UFO" / "Viva Bobby Joe" (Lightning – September 1978). A collection of all these tracks, plus other unreleased material, was released in 1998 entitled Top of the Bops (Overground), but it is currently out of print.

== Career ==
The core line-up of the band (John Hodgson aka Blank Frank, Alan Cornforth aka Nicky Knoxx & Damian (Dimmer) Blackwell aka Telly Sett) evolved from a rock band called Adamanta Chubb who started in 1974. After several false starts and many line-up changes this trio finally emerged as Blitzkrieg Bop in February 1977, joined in line-up No. 1 by Mick Hylton (aka Mick Sick) and Anne Hodgson (aka Gloria, no relation to John Hodgson).

An eight-week residency at the Speedway Hotel cemented their local reputation. Buoyed by their local success they recorded their debut single "Let's Go" / "Bugger Off" / "9 Till 5", and released a limited run of 500 copies in early June 1977. By this time guitarist Dimmer Blackwell had left. The band decided to carry on as a four piece.

The single sold out within days and received some favourable reviews in the national music papers, most notably the NME. Keith Yershon of Lightning Records read this review and asked the band to re-record the A-side for their second single, together with two new songs for the B-side, "Life Is Just A So-So" and "Mental Case".

The band played several local gigs with fellow Teessiders Dangerbird, featuring a teenage Rod Liddle on lead vocals. As 1977 wore on, the band continued to gig regularly, securing support spots with bands such as Ultravox!, Radio Stars and The Saints. Anne Hodgson decided to quit the band, and was replaced in September 1977 by Ray Radford (aka Ray Gunn), an old friend of vocalist John Hodgson.

The re-recorded "Let's Go" was eventually released in December 1977 to decent reviews, but not as positive as the Mortonsound version. By February 1978 the band were ready to record the follow-up, and two songs were taped in London with line-up No. 3: "(You're Like A) UFO" and "Viva Bobby Joe", the latter a cover version of the 1960s hit single by The Equals.

Gigs continued to happen, with support spots with Penetration, Roogalator, X-Ray Spex, Generation X and Slaughter & The Dogs. Slaughter invited the band on their 1978 "Do It Dog Style" UK tour, scheduled for April and May. Eater were also on the bill. The tour started off brightly, but poor ticket sales and poor organisation led to the tour disintegrating after only a handful of dates.

Following this debacle, guitarist Ray Radford decided to quit. He was quickly replaced by Micky Dunn (aka Bert Presley), from local Teesside band The Lice. New material was written, with the band taking a more commercial direction, leaning more towards a power pop/new wave sound. The band continued to gig during the summer of 1978, with support spots with The Adverts, Ultravox! and The Doctors Of Madness, as well as their own gigs.

By September 1978 bassist Mick Hylton had also had enough, feeling the band had lost momentum, mainly due to the length of time Lightning Records were taking to release the "UFO" single, and their refusal to let the band record an album. He was replaced by Graeme Moses (aka Kid Moses), again from local band The Lice. Around this time the "UFO" single, the band's third and final single, was released to poor reviews. This dismayed the band even further and their mood was not helped when their manager Larry Ottaway (a BBC Radio presenter) quit in November 1978.

The band's spirits were revived slightly in January 1979 when Greg Shaw licensed the Mortonsound "Let's Go" for a US release on the Bomp! Records compilation Waves. This was short-lived, and in February 1979 the band finally called it a day when John left to join Basczax, who was joined a few days later by drummer Alan Cornforth.

A line-up of the band (featuring John Hodgson, Micky Dunn and Graeme Moses from the 1977–79 period) reformed in 1994 for two gigs, and finally in 1999 a line-up featuring John Hodgson, Micky Dunn, Graeme Moses and Ray Radford from the 1977–79 period came together for a 20th anniversary re-union concert at The Cornerhouse, Middlesbrough.

Singer Blank Frank recounted his time in the band in "A Hard Road To Nowhere" (1998)

As well as the 28-track Top of the Bops compilation CD (Overground OVER69CD) in 1998, three more private CD releases followed in 1999: Bottom of the Barrell, Now That's What I Call Rubbish Vol.1 and Live at the Cornerhouse – 1999. A 28 track compilation of live material was released on CD on 1 November 2013 on the Opportunes label, entitled "Live '77 & Beyond" (Opportunes OPIDCD003). A 16 track compilation of all their studio recordings, including six previously unreleased songs, was released on vinyl on 1 March 2014 on Italy's Rave Up Records, entitled "Studio Stuff" (Opportunes OPIDLP004). A 17 track compilation of rare studio and live material was released on 22 September 2014 on Sweden's NE Records, entitled "The Usual Suspects" in black, blue and yellow vinyl (NE Records NE024/OPIDLP005).

The original Mortonsound "Let's Go" 7" single is one of the more collectable artifacts from the punk era, regularly fetching upwards of £300 on eBay.

== Line-up 1 ==
- Blank Frank – Vocals/Keyboards
- Telly Sett – Guitar
- Gloria – Guitar
- Mick Sick – Bass
- Nicky Knoxx – Drums

== Line-up 2 ==
- Blank Frank – Vocals/Keyboards
- Gloria – Guitar
- Mick Sick – Bass
- Nicky Knoxx – Drums

== Line-up 3 ==
- Blank Frank – Vocals/Keyboards
- Ray Gunn – Guitar
- Mick Sick – Bass
- Nicky Knoxx – Drums

== Line-up 4 ==
- Blank Frank – Vocals/Keyboards
- Bert Presley – Guitar
- Mick Sick – Bass
- Nicky Knoxx – Drums

== Line-up 5 ==
- Blank Frank – Vocals/Keyboards
- Bert Presley – Guitar
- Kid Moses – Bass
- Nicky Knoxx – Drums
