= The Album (Eater album) =

Studio album by Eater
- Released: 1977
- Recorded: Sound Development Studios, Riverside Recordings
- Genre: Punk rock
- Label: The Label
- Producer: Dave Goodman

The Album is the debut studio album by English punk rock band Eater, released in 1977 by record label The Label.

== Reception ==
Professional ratings
Review scores
Source	Rating
AllMusic	4/5 stars

In Trouser Press, Jack Rabid called The Album "uneven but spirited", highlighting the band's "hilariously trashy sped-up covers".

Musician Henry Rollins listed it as one of his 20 favorite punk albums.

== Track listing ==
Side one
No.	Title	Writer(s)	Length
1.	"You"	Andy Blade	2:04
2.	"Public Toys"	Blade; Ian Woodcock	2:00
3.	"Room for One"	Blade; Brian Chevette	1:42
4.	"Lock It Up"	Blade; Woodcock	2:01
5.	"Sweet Jane"	Lou Reed	2:19
6.	"Fifteen"	Alice Cooper	1:28
7.	"I Don't Need It"	Blade	1:40
8.	"Anne"	Blade; Woodcock	1:58
9.	"Get Raped"	Eater	2:34

Side two
No.	Title	Writer(s)	Length
1.	"Space Dreaming"	Blade	1:15
2.	"Queen Bitch"	David Bowie	2:13
3.	"My Business"	Blade; Woodcock	2:08
4.	"Waiting for the Man"	Reed	2:43
5.	"No More"	Blade	2:07
6.	"No Brains"	Blade; Woodcock	2:46
7.	"Luv & Piece"	Eater	5:13
