= The Drones (English band) =

English punk rock band formed in Manchester in 1975

- Origin: Manchester, England
- Genre: Punk rock
- Years active: 1975–1982; 1999; 2015–present
- Labels: O.H.M.S., Valer
- Past members: M.J. Drone; Gus Gangrene; Steve 'Whisper' Cundall; Pete Purrfect

The Drones are an English punk rock band from Manchester, England. For a period of time, the band were in their early days produced and managed by Paul Morley.

One critic wrote: "Bonafide DIY three-chord wonders, the Drones were there at punk's inception." The Drones were reformed at the beginning of 2016 by original members Gus & Wispa. Gus subsequently retired due to ill health, and the current line up is Steve (Wispa) Cundall on bass and vocals, Brian (Mad Muffet) Grantham on drums, and Al (Angus) Crosby on lead guitar.

== Career ==
Formed in Manchester in 1975, the band started out as a pub rock outfit called Rockslide and released a single called "Roller Coaster". When this failed to make an impact, they reinvented themselves as a punk rock band.

In 1976, The Drones made their debut at the Houldsworth Hall, Manchester with Generation X as support.

Most bands in the thriving Manchester punk scene stayed in the city, but The Drones relocated to London. They became one of the pioneering punk bands that performed in the first few months of the now-legendary Roxy Club. They supported The Vibrators in January 1977, headlined in February, and supported X-Ray Spex and Chelsea in March. Later that year they supported The Stranglers on tour. The band appeared on two influential early punk compilation albums Streets and Short Circuit: Live at the Electric Circus.

The band's debut EP, Temptations of a White Collar Worker (1977), was described by one reviewer as "classic dole-queue punk." In October 1977, the Drones' second single, "Bone Idol", was released. In December 1977, they recorded a session at Maida Vale 4 studio for John Peel at BBC Radio 1. The track listing was "Be My Baby", "The Change", "Clique", and "Movement". That same month they released their debut album, Further Temptations, which has come to be regarded as a punk classic.

Fans would have to wait until May 1999 for the follow-up album, Sorted. The band reformed and toured to promote the record; including concert dates in the United States.

In 2001 "Bone Idol" was included in Mojo magazine's list of the best punk rock singles of all time.

Lead singer and guitarist M.J. Drone (aka Michael Howells) died on 10 January 2013.

Drummer Pete Purrfect (aka Peter Howells) died on 22 December 2019

In 2015, The Drones re-formed with original members Steve 'Whispa' Cundall, Gary 'Gus' Callendar and new members Martin Smith (drums) and Glenn Jones (guitar). In 2016, the new Drones line up played festival and other dates and recording a live album as well as new material.

January 2017 saw the line up change again, as Gus, Glenn and Martin are replaced by Brian Grantham (ex Slaughter & the Dogs and Born Idle) on drums, and Al Crosby (ex Ed Banger & the Nosebleeds and Born Idle) on lead guitar.

The new line up have released a new EP Will You Stand in Front of Bullets? on their own Idle Records label. Five brand new songs, and a reworking of "Hard on Me" from the first EP Temptations were included. The first print run was available at the Rebellion Punk Festival at the beginning of August, and promptly sold out. A second run was printed, and the EP was officially launched in Manchester on 15 September 2018.

== Discography ==
=== Studio albums ===
- Further Temptations (Valer, VLRP 1, December 1977)
- Sorted (Captain Oi, May 1999)
- Dirty Bastards (Alternative Action, A.A. 041, 1999)

=== Compilation albums ===
- Expectations: Tapes From The Attic 1975–1982 (Overground, April 1997) – A collection of unreleased studio recordings, alternative versions and live tapes.
- Further Temptations (Get Back) – A Double album of material
- The Attic Tapes 1975-82 (Get Back) – LP
- Short Circuit:Live at the Electric Circus (Virgin, 1978)

=== Appearances on various artist compilations (Selective) ===
Listing of those various artist compilation albums mentioned in the text of the main article:

- "Lookalikes" featured on the Streets compilation (Beggars Banquet Records, 1977)
- "Persecution Complex" featured on Short Circuit: Live at the Electric Circus (VCL, June 1978)

=== Singles and EPs ===
- Temptations of a White Collar Worker EP: "Lookalikes" / "Corgi Crap" / "Hard on Me" / "You'll Lose" (O.H.M.S., May 1977)
- "Bone Idol" / "I Just Wanna Be Myself" (Valer, October 1977)
- "Be My Baby" / "Lift Off the Bans" (Valer, January 1978)
- "Can't See" / "Fooled Today" (Fabulous, March 1980)
- "Sorted" / "Johnny Go Home" (Alternative Action, A.A. 034, 1997)
- Get Sorted Split with APA-Adolf & The Piss Artists EP: "Sad So Sad" / "Sorted" (45 Revolutions, 45R-4, 1998)
- Will You Stand in Front of Bullets? 6 track EP. (Idle Records IR002. August 2018) included "Cannon Fodder", "The Human Race", "White Noise Napper", "Rats", "Friction" and "Hard on Me"

== See also ==
- List of punk bands from the United Kingdom
- List of 1970s punk rock musicians
