= Streets (punk album) =

1977 compilation album by various artists

Compilation album by Various
- Released: End of 1977
- Genre: Punk rock
- Label: Beggars Banquet

Streets is a compilation album of early British and French punk rock bands from a variety of independent record labels. It was an attempt at an end of year ‘round up’ and, significantly, was the first album released on Beggars Banquet Records (catalogue number BEGA1).

The sleeve notes stated that: "1977 was the year that the music came out of the concert halls & onto the streets; when independent labels sprang out of the woodwork to feed new tastes; when rock music once again became about energy & fun; when the major’s boardrooms lost control. Suddenly we could do anything".

== Release and reception ==
Professional ratings
Review scores
Source	Rating
Christgau's Consumer Guide	A−

The Members' contribution to Streets was their debut on vinyl, and its impact was such that it contributed to a record deal with Stiff Records. It was also The Doll's recording debut. Within 14 months of the release of the compilation, both bands went on to have UK Top 30 hit singles; the Members with "The Sound of the Suburbs" (number 12 in January 1979) and the Doll with "Desire Me" (number 28 in December 1978). The album also included "Talk Talk Talk Talk" by The Reaction, which, as "Talk Talk", was later a hit for singer Mark Hollis's next group, Talk Talk.

Music critic Robert Christgau named the album one of the few import-only records from the 1970s he loved yet omitted from Christgau's Record Guide: Rock Albums of the Seventies (1981).

In 2004, the record was included in a trakMarx review of Classic Punk Rock Compilation LPs, where it was described as "the first real collection of ‘highlights from independent British labels’ ever undertaken ... Streets was utterly groundbreaking stuff.". The Punk77 website described it as an "excellent" compilation. Two of the tracks – Slaughter & the Dogs’s "Cranked Up Really High" and The Nosebleeds' "Ain’t Bin To No Music School" - were included in Mojo magazine’s list of the best punk rock singles of all time. Another track, The Drones’ "Lookalikes", was similarly acclaimed in an all-time best list by Steve Gardner of NKVD Records.

== Track listing ==
Side one

1. "Trash" by The Doll
2. "Fear on the Streets" by The Members
3. "Be My Prisoner" by The Lurkers
4. "Isgodaman" by Arthur Comics
5. "Arabs in 'Arrads" by The Art Attacks
6. "19" by Dogs
7. "Talk Talk Talk Talk" by The Reaction
8. "College Girls" by Cane

Side two

9. "Cranked Up Really High" by Slaughter & the Dogs
10. "Ain't Bin to No Music School" by The Nosebleeds
11. "Lookalikes" by The Drones
12. "Hungry" by Zeros
13. "Bend and Flush" by The Pork Dukes
14. "Disaster Movie" by Exile
15. "Jerkin" by Drive
16. "Innocents" by John Cooper Clarke
17. "No More Rock 'n' Roll" by Tractor
