= Punk: Attitude =

2005 film

- Directed by: Don Letts
- Starring: Henry Rollins, Captain Sensible, Jim Jarmusch, Mick Jones, Jello Biafra, Darryl Jenifer
- Release date: 2005
- Running time: 90 minutes
- Language: English

Punk: Attitude is a film by Don Letts. It explores the "punk" revolution, genre and following from its beginning in the mid-1970s up to its effect on modern rock music and other genres. The cast is a veritable list of alternative musicians and directors offering their opinions on what has been called a musical revolution.

The film was officially released on April 25, 2005 at the Tribeca Film Festival in the U.S.A. Reviews have generally been favorable with an average of 3.5 - 4 stars with many people commenting on the accuracy and approach of the film.

== Plot ==
The film begins showing the roots of punk music with many views on various artists and genres who accentuated the beginning of the genre, like the MC5 and the Velvet Underground. Punk: Attitude then proceeds chronologically to sort through the various artists and alumni who were central to the movement, drawing light on the general idea or "Attitude" of the punk movement, which spoke out for a generation. Bands such as The Ramones, The Stooges, The Clash and The Sex Pistols feature prominently throughout. The movie offers a canvas of praise and respect given from many interviewees as these bands are heralded commonly as the beginning of Punk progressively through the movie. Rare concert footage and personal accounts of gigs and band meetings highlight the aggression and destructive entities with surprising accuracy. The movie wraps up by emphasizing the influence that punk has on modern music.

== Cast ==
One of the film's celebrated attributes comes in the form of its cast, showcasing the who's who of Punk Rock/Alternative culture contemporaries like David Johansen, Thurston Moore, Henry Rollins, Captain Sensible, Jim Jarmusch, Mick Jones, Jello Biafra, Siouxsie Sioux, and Darryl Jenifer.

== DVD Releases ==
In 2005 the film was released on DVD through Capitol Entertainment but has since gone out of print.

On January 11, 2010 Shout! Factory re-released the film complete with all the original bonus material as well as another DVD worth of extras.
