= Eater (band) =

British punk rock band

- Origin: Finchley, North London, England
- Genre: Punk rock
- Years active: 1976–1979, 1996–1997, 1999, 2003, 2006, 2022–present
- Label: The Label
- Past members: Brian Haddock; Lutfi Radwan; Roger Bullen; Ian Woodcock; Phil Rowland; Gary Steadman

Eater are an early British punk rock band from North London who took their name from a Marc Bolan lyric.

In October 2001, the band's second single, "Thinking of the USA" (originally released in June 1977), was included in Mojo magazine's list of the hundred best punk rock singles. In 1999, the track also appeared on the five-CD Universal Records box set 1-2-3-4 Punk & New Wave 1976-1979.

The band's sound was described as "basic boy-ish punk rock" in The Great Indie Discography.

== History ==
The band was formed in 1976 by four high school friends from Finchley, North London: Anglo-Egyptian singer and guitarist Andy Blade (real name: Ashruf Radwan, guitarist Brian Chevette (real name: Brian Haddock) and Blade's brother, drummer Social Demise (real name: Lutfi Radwan).

The band's name came from a line in the Marc Bolan song "Suneye", from the 1970 T. Rex (album) which features the verse "Tyrannosaurus Rex, the eater of cars." Eater later recorded a cover version of T-Rex's "Jeepster."

Eater were known for being one of the youngest bands, if not the youngest band, in the punk scene. They were 14–17 years old when they formed the group. "They were basically young kids, striving to master their instruments and out to shock", according to Up Yours! A Guide to UK Punk, New Wave & Early Post Punk.

Despite originating in London, the band made its first public performance on 20 September 1976 at Manchester's Holdsworth Hall, featuring the Buzzcocks as their support act. The band did not yet have a permanent bassist and hired a local musician for the show. Lutfi Radwan (a.k.a. Social Demise) was soon replaced by drummer Dee Generate (real name: Roger Bullen), and by November 1976, they had recruited bassist Ian Woodcock in time to play their first London gig. Radwan went on to become an academic who lectures in food ethics and the central role of sustainable living in a time of scarcity in the 21st century.

Eater became one of the pioneering punk bands that played live in the first few months of the now-legendary Roxy Club. They topped the bill twice in January 1977; the second time they were supported by the Damned. They headlined again in February, this time supported by Johnny Moped, and twice more in March, supported first by the Lurkers and then by Sham 69. They also supplied two of their tracks, "15" (a version of "I'm Eighteen" by Alice Cooper) and "Don't Need It", to the seminal live compilation album The Roxy London WC2, released on 24 June 1977 by Harvest Records.

The album was well received by The Virgin Encyclopedia of Popular Music and others.Trakmarx recognised the album as one of the five "Classic Punk Rock Compilation LPs", describing it as "capturing the full force of the first wave head on, The Roxy is an essential historical reminder of the power and the glory of punk rock". Author and critic Dave Thompson called it "one of the most important… live albums ever made, a document of the Roxy Club from on and off stage".

Extracts from their performances at The Roxy were also included in Don Letts' Punk Rock Movie (1978) with one critic describing the film footage as “captur(ing) an embryonic rock revolution...Verité rock had become verité celluloid almost by accident."

The band signed to a small London independent label called The Label, which released three singles produced by Dave Goodman: "Outside View" (1 March 1977), "Thinkin' of the USA" (June 1977) and "Lock It Up" (October 1977). The latter featured new drummer Phil Rowland, who had replaced Generate in May 1977.

Their sole studio album, simply titled The Album, was released on 11 November 1977. Again produced by Goodman, it included sped-up versions of songs by David Bowie ("Queen Bitch") and the Velvet Underground ("Sweet Jane" and "Waiting for the Man"). "All songs on their sole full-length release sound about the same, played with one stiff light-speed beat and a snotty vehemence to each track, adding up to a ridiculous classic", said AllMusic critic Fred Beldin in a retrospective review, adding, "As fast and clumsy as the material is, there's an undeniable tunefulness at work, particularly in irresistible singalongs like 'No Brains' and 'Room for One', and the sprightly single 'Lock It Up' even attempts some naïve vocal harmonies as they sneer at the upper classes".

The Label issued the four-song live EP Get Your Yo-Yo's Out, recorded at Dingwalls, on 2 June 1978. Gary Steadman, who later formed Classix Nouveaux with the guitarist from X-Ray Spex, replaced Chevette for their final single, "What She Wants She Needs", produced by Martin Hayles and Gwyn Mathias and released in December 1978. The band split up in January 1979.

== Later projects ==
Woodcock joined the Vibrators in July 1979, appearing on their 1980 single, a cover of the Spencer Davis Group's "Gimme Some Lovin'". Woodcock also played with Empire, the solo project of Generation X guitarist Derwood Andrews.

Rowland joined Slaughter & the Dogs, appearing on their 1979 single, a punk rock cover version of the Frankie Valli tune "You're Ready Now", and later played with the London Cowboys, a band which featured Sex Pistols' bassist Glen Matlock, Generation X bassist Tony James (musician), the Heartbreakers' Jerry Nolan and the Clash's original drummer Terry Chimes. Rowland also played with Studio Sweethearts, a band composed of ex-members of Slaughter & the Dogs and Billy Duffy, working with sound engineer Vic Maile and promoted by ex–David Bowie manager, Kenneth Pitt.

Steadman formed Classix Nouveaux with Jak Airport of X-Ray Spex in 1979, playing on their 1981 debut Night People.

Blade has continued to develop his own solo career, releasing music throughout the 2000s on a number of labels (including Cherry Red Records) as well as continuing to play on the live circuit. In 2005, he published a book about his time with Eater and beyond, called The Secret Life of a Teenage Punk Rocker: The Andy Blade Chronicles (Cherry Red Books, part of the Cherry Red Records company).

== Reunions ==
Eater reformed to play the first Holidays in the Sun festival, held in 1996 in Blackpool, and recorded two new songs in 1997 ("Going Down" and "Vegetable Girl") for a projected single that was never released. Both tracks later appeared on The Eater Chronicles 1976-2003 compilation, released in 2003 by Anagram Records.

They played another reunion show on 14 May 1999 at the Brighton Centre, supporting Fugazi.

Eater reformed again in 2006, playing a one-off gig at the 100 Club on 28 September, supported by T. V. Smith of the Adverts, and supporting Buzzcocks on 2 December (the 30th anniversary of their original tour) at The Forum.

== Discography ==
=== Studio albums ===
- The Album (1977, The Label)

=== Singles and EPs ===
- Outside View (1977, The Label)
- Thinkin' of the USA (1977, The Label)
- Lock It Up (1977, The Label)
- Get Your Yo-Yo's Out (1978, The Label)
- What She Wants She Needs (1978, The Label)
- Fifteen (2022)

=== Live albums ===
- Live at Barbarellas 1977 (2004, Anagram Records)

=== Compilation albums ===
- The History of Eater Volume One (1985, Delorean Record Company)
- The Rest of Eater (1989, Edison Records)
- The Compleat Eater (1993, Anagram Records)
- All of Eater (1995, Creativeman Disc)
- The Eater Chronicles 1976-2003 (2003, Anagram Records)

=== Compilation appearances ===
- "15" and "Don't Need It" on The Roxy London WC2 (1977, Harvest Records) No. 24 UK Albums Chart
- "Point of View" and "Typewriter Babes" on The Label So Far (1979, The Label)
- "Thinking of the USA" on 1-2-3-4 Punk & New Wave 1976-1979 (1999, Universal Records)

== See also ==
- List of punk bands from the United Kingdom
- List of 1970s punk rock musicians
