= Further Temptations =

Album by The Drones

Studio album by The Drones
- Released: November 1977
- Recorded: CBS Studios London, 1977
- Genre: Punk
- Length: 36:52
- Label: Valer
- Producer: Simon Humphrey

The Drones chronology
Further Temptations (1977)	Sorted (1999)

Further Temptations is the debut album by The Drones, originally released in 1977. The album included two re-recorded tracks ("Corgi Crap" and "Lookalikes") from their debut 7", Temptations of a White Collar Worker. In 1993, Anagram Records reissued the album on CD and included eight bonus tracks culled from the band's various singles.

== Original track listing ==
=== Side 1 ===
1. "Persecution Complex" – 2:36
2. "Bone Idol" – 1:54
3. "Movement" – 2:51
4. "Be My Baby" (The Ronettes cover) – 3:19
5. "Corgi Crap" – 2:43
6. "Sad So Sad" – 2:38
7. "The Change" – 3:39

=== Side 2 ===
1. "Lookalikes" – 2:36
2. "The Underdog" – 3:00
3. "No More Time" – 2:35
4. "City Drones" – 3:40
5. "Just Want To Be Myself" – 2:44
6. "Lift Off the Bans" – 2:37

== Bonus tracks ==
1. "Lookalikes" (single version) – 2:34
2. "Corgi Crap" (single version) – 2:53
3. "Hard on Me" – 2:12
4. "You'll Lose" – 3:40
5. "Just Want To Be Myself" (single version) – 2:49
6. "Bone Idol" (single version) – 1:59
7. "Can't See" – 3:32
8. "Fooled Today" – 3:16
