= Soo Catwoman =

British punk icon (1954–2025)

- Born: Susan Lucas; 24 October 1954; London, England
- Died: 30 September 2025 (aged 70); London, England
- Occupations: Actress; model

Susan Lucas (24 October 1954 – 30 September 2025), better known as Soo Catwoman, was a British actress and model who was a member of London's early punk subculture. Lucas was active in the London punk scene between 1976 and 1978, where she became a muse of photographer Bob Gruen and befriended the members of the Sex Pistols. Her distinctive, cat-influenced hairstyle is an iconic image within punk, and has led to her being featured in publications including the Guardian and News of the World. Her image has influenced other pop culture figures such as Keith Flint, and fashion designers including Junya Watanabe, Chanel, Obey and Mugler.

== Life and career ==
Lucas was born in London on 24 October 1954. She began developing her distinctive hairstyle in 1972, when she began to spike up the sides of her hair in reference to Bride of Frankenstein, while also having a pink-striped fringe. Displeased with always having to style this hair, in 1976 she had the middle of her head shaved in an Ealing barbershop. This haircut led to her and Marco Pirroni being approached by a woman in summer 1976 to join Club Louise, a lesbian club on Poland Street, where she befriended the members of London's early punk scene. It was also at the club that she met photographer Bob Gruen, for whom she soon became a muse.

In the following years, Lucas became an increasingly prominent figure within the scene, being featured on the front cover of punk zines Society Today and Society Today, bands' t-shirts, record sleeves, posters, flyers and was used by some mainstream news publications as an example of punk's effect on the youth. One prominent example of this was a few weeks before the 100 Club Punk Special, when Lucas along with Simone Thomas, Debbie Wilson and Sharon Hayman were approached on Park Lane by a photographer and paid £15 to be photographed. These photos were then published in a Sunday issue of the News of the World as a part of a moral panic article claiming the four were prostitutes. She was particularly close to Sex Pistols members John Lydon and Sid Vicious, and Captain Sensible of the Damned, sharing a squat with Vicious and Sensible in Acton during this period. Lucas was frequently pictured by Ray Stevenson posing with members of the original fans of the Sex Pistols known as the Bromley Contingent such as Siouxsie Sioux, Steven Severin and Billy Idol. While she was also associated with the Bromley Contingent by all the journalists, she later claimed not to have been a member. By 1978, following the dissolution of the Sex Pistols, she became less involved in the punk scene.

In 1979, she briefly joined the Bradford band the Invaders, initially providing backing vocals; she also sang the lead on the band's second single "Backstreet Romeo" from their 1980 album Test Card, released by Polydor. She is also featured on the cover of the band's first single "Magic Mirror" from the 1980 Magic Mirror 7".

Lucas died from complications of meningitis at a hospital in London, after falling into a coma, on 30 September 2025, at the age of 70. Her two children, Dion October Lucas and Shem Lucas, are both musicians.

== Influence ==
As punk became more widely known, Lucas became one of its most iconic images, with NME crediting her as one of the creators of punk fashion. In The Filth and the Fury, John Lydon singles her out among the early London punks, citing her "skill, style, and bravery". In 1980, she was portrayed by Faye Hart in the Julien Temple directed Sex Pistols' mockumentary the Great Rock 'n' Roll Swindle, and in the FX miniseries Pistol (2022), portrayed by Iris Law.

Lucas's fashion style has been referenced by fashion boutiques and designers including Junya Watanabe, Chanel, Obey and Mugler. Her distinctive hairstyle influenced the Prodigy's Keith Flint to adopt a similar haircut in the 1990s, which in turn briefly became popular during 2021 under the name "hair horns".

== Filmography ==
Appearances

- The Punk Rock Movie (1978, dir. Don Letts)
- The Filth and the Fury (2000, dir. Julien Temple, VHS/NTSC)

Portrayals

- The Great Rock 'n' Roll Swindle (1980, portrayed by Faye Hart)
- Pistol (2022, portrayed by Iris Law)
