= Acme Attractions =

Clothing store on Kings Road, Chelsea, London

Coordinates: 51°29′16.63″N 0°10′1.95″W

- Then co-workers Don Letts and Jeannette Lee (co-owner of Rough Trade Records) in the basement Acme Attractions store
- Type: Thrift store Fetish Store; Record Store
- Industry: Retail
- Founded: 1974
- Headquarters: Kings Road, Chelsea, London
- Products: Second hand clothing, footwear, bedding, furniture, jewellery, electronics, toys, and housewares

Acme Attractions was a London clothing store on Kings Road, Chelsea, London, that in the early 1970s provided a place for many punk and reggae musicians to hang out. Shop assistant and manager Don Letts described Acme Attraction as a place "where the interaction between the different factions became more important than selling merchandise, even though at that age it was a deadly combination."

== History ==
Acme Attractions was inspired by Malcolm McLaren and Vivienne Westwood's Fifties-inspired boutique Let it Rock (revamped in 1972 and renamed Too Fast To Live Too Young To Die). In spring 1974, a radical change saw their shop become Sex, selling fetish wear and Westwood's innovative designs. Acme's owner, John Krivine, decided to venture into clothing with Steph Raynor. In 1974, Acme Attractions initially opened as a stall in the antiques market Antiquarius on the King's Road, Chelsea. While it was owned by Krivine and Raynor its public face was Don Letts who says that Acme was selling "electric-blue zoot suits and jukeboxes, and pumping dub reggae all day long". Acme actually had to move to the basement after complaints about Don Letts's pounding dub reggae.

Within two weeks of opening there were queues to get in. Steph Raynor remembers:

We had an office with a (one)-way mirror, and we'd sit in there watching and pissing ourselves because we were so excited at how busy it was ... I'd get home some nights and I'd have thousand of pounds to count out all over the carpet.

— Steph Raynor part owner of Acme

We'd try the clothes on in Acme Attractions, fluffy fake fur jumpers with plastic see-through breast panels, rubber tops and trousers. I wanted plastic dungarees, but they looked horrible. I got Mum to copy the clothes, tight black T-shirts with zips across the nipples. "I should open my own shop. This stuff takes five minutes to make." Mum didn't understand the importance of an original.

— Boy George,

By the mid 70s, Acme had quite a scene attracting the likes of The Clash, the Sex Pistols, Chrissie Hynde, Patti Smith, Deborah Harry and Bob Marley. Letts remembers that "Marley ... come by because he knew he could get a good draw from the thriving black-market action that also went on in Acme." The scene created by the shop also led to the formation of Generation X, which launched the pop music career of Billy Idol.

== Andrew Czezowski ==
The Acme accountant, Andrew Czezowski, seeing the potential in the crowd the store attracted, started up The Roxy, the first punk-rock venue in London, so that people could go from the store and have some place to party. Letts was the first house DJ. Czezowski attended the 100 Club Punk Special in September 1976. He managed Generation X and The Damned and later founded The Fridge nightclub at 390 Brixton Rd in 1981.

== Chelsea ==
Chelsea, a band, formed in August 1976 and were originally managed by John Krivine and Steph Raynor, and was in direct competition with Malcolm McLaren's Sex and Sex Pistols.

== Boy London ==
Seeing the success of punk and how a new market was created for punk related clothing and merchandise, Stephane Raynor and Israel-based businessman John Krivine closed Acme Attractions to create Boy London, at 153 King's Road, in 1976.

John Krivine hired Genesis P-Orridge and Peter Christopherson for branding of Boy. Vivienne Westwood licensed designs to Boy, who issued them, some with alterations, over the next eight years. Krivine sold the company in 1984.

While Don Letts opened the new store, he soon quit, "It was the bastard child of Acme, created to capitalize on the "tabloid punk" and although I opened and ran the joint it just weren't my speed. I quit to manage the Slits and headed off on the White Riot tour with The Clash."

== Sources ==
- "GUM Issue 1-2012/13".
- "Trousers". Museum of London.
- Strongman, Phil (12 April 2018). Pretty Vacant: A History of UK Punk. Chicago Review Press. ISBN 9781556527524.
- Nika, Colleen (12 September 2012). "BOY London on Outfitting the Punk Movement". Rolling Stone.
