= The Roxy London WC2 =

Live album by Various
- Released: July 1977
- Recorded: January–April 1977
- Venue: The Roxy, Covent Garden, London
- Genre: Punk
- Label: Harvest; Reissue 1: Receiver; Reissue 2: Sanctuary
- Producer: Mike Thorne

The Roxy London WC2 is a live album of recordings taken from various punk bands that played at The Roxy club in Covent Garden, London between January and April 1977.

== Overview ==
The original Harvest Records release in 1977 (cat. no. SHSP 4069) included tracks by Eater, Johnny Moped, and the Unwanted that were left off the 1991 Receiver reissue (cat. no. RR 132). Also, the Boys, the Damned, Sham 69 and U.K. Subs appeared on the reissue but not the original. Finally, even for bands that appear on both discs, some of the tracks have been changed (e.g. Wire's "1 2 X U", X-Ray Spex' "Oh Bondage Up Yours!", etc.) The Receiver album was re-released in 2001 by Sanctuary as a double CD set.

The original 12-track album reached No. 24 in the UK Albums Chart and spent five weeks in the chart. The album was described as "seminal" by The Virgin Encyclopedia of Popular Music and others. In 2004, it was recognised as one of the five "Classic Punk Rock Compilation LPs" of all time, with writer Johnny Normal declaring, "Capturing the full force of the first wave head on, The Roxy is an essential historical reminder of the power and the glory of punk rock". Author and critic Dave Thompson called it "one of the most important (and poorest sounding) live albums ever made, a document of the Roxy Club from on and off stage". However, it has also been described as "a punk rock album of 10 unknown acts who can barely play".

Paul Marko's book The Roxy London WC2: A Punk History (2007) delved deeper, featuring more obscure bands than those on this compilation.

== Track listing ==
Side one

1. "Runaway" (Mick Rossi, Wayne Barrett) by Slaughter & the Dogs
2. "Boston Babies" (Rossi, Barrett) by Slaughter & the Dogs
3. "Freedom" (Olli Wisdom, Mark Nelson, Danny Destroy, Paul Grotesque) by the Unwanted
4. "Lowdown" (Bruce Gilbert, Graham Lewis, Colin Newman, Robert Gotobed) by Wire
5. "1 2 X U" (Gilbert, Lewis, Newman, Gotobed) by Wire
6. "Bored Teenagers" (T.V. Smith) by the Adverts

Side two

7. "Hard Loving Man" (Paul Halford) by Johnny Moped
8. "Don't Need It" (Andy Blade, Ian Woodcock, Brian Chevette, Dee Generate) by Eater
9. "15" (Michael Bruce, Alice Cooper, Dennis Dunaway, Neal Smith, Glen Buxton) by Eater
10. "Oh Bondage Up Yours!" (Poly Styrene) by X-Ray Spex
11. "Breakdown" (Pete Shelley, Howard Devoto) by Buzzcocks
12. "Love Battery" (Shelley, Devoto) by Buzzcocks

1991 reissue

1. "Runaway" by Slaughter & the Dogs
2. "Boston Babies" by Slaughter & the Dogs
3. "Rip Off" by Sham 69
4. "Borstal Breakout" by Sham 69
5. "Just Don't Care" by Wire
6. "TV" by Wire
7. "Bored Teenagers" by the Adverts
8. "Gary Gilmore's Eyes" by the Adverts
9. "Living in the City" by the Boys
10. "Sabre Dancing" by the Boys
11. "Sick On You" by the Boys
12. "Oh Bondage, Up Yours!" by X-Ray Spex
13. "I Am a Cliche" by X-Ray Spex
14. "Orgasm Addict" by Buzzcocks
15. "Breakdown" by Buzzcocks
16. "Love Battery" by Buzzcocks
17. "World War" by U.K. Subs
18. "I Couldn't Be with You" by U.K. Subs
19. "Smash It Up" by the Damned
20. "Neat Neat Neat" by the Damned
