= Electric Circus, Manchester =

1970s music venue in Collyhurst, Manchester, England

Coordinates: 53.49584°N 2.22048°W

The Electric Circus was a music venue in Collyhurst, Manchester, England, situated at the corner of Teignmouth Avenue and Collyhurst Street. It was an iconic and seminal venue for punk rock in 1970s Manchester.

== History ==
The venue was originally the Palace Cinema, then the Top Hat Club run by Bernard Manning and then a bingo hall. It became a heavy metal club in the 1970s until punk arrived there in 1976, and Richard Boon and Alan Robinson started promoting nights there. However the building was in a poor state of repair and was closed in late 1977 due to objections from the fire service and Manchester City Council. It re-opened briefly again in 1978 as the New Electric Circus but by 1980 the building was demolished and replaced by housing.

Kevin Cummins described the venue as a khazi adding "everything was painted black so you couldn't see how shitty it was".

== Music at the Electric Circus ==
The venue hosted a wide range of bands including:

- The Adverts
- Ed Banger & the Nosebleeds
- Buzzcocks
- Chelsea
- John Cooper Clarke
- The Clash
- The Damned - played in January 1977
- The Drones
- The Fall
- The Jam
- The Negatives
- Penetration
- The Ramones - played first gig in Manchester here in 1977
- Sex Pistols - played twice in December 1976, including 9 December 1976
- Slaughter & the Dogs
- Siouxsie and the Banshees
- Steel Pulse
- The Stranglers
- Talking Heads
- Johnny Thunders and the Heartbreakers
- Warsaw played for the first time on 29 May 1977 at the Electric Circus (despite being billed as The Stiff Kittens), supporting Buzzcocks, Penetration, John Cooper Clarke and Jon the Postman.
- White Riot Tour played on 8 May 1977 featuring The Clash, The Slits, Buzzcocks and Subway Sect
- The Worst

The last two nights of the Electric Circus (1 and 2 October 1977) were recorded and released by Virgin Records in January 1978 as a 10-inch compilation album Short Circuit: Live at the Electric Circus featuring The Fall, John Cooper Clarke, Warsaw, The Drones, Steel Pulse and Buzzcocks.

== Sources ==
- Curtis, Deborah (2007). Touching from a Distance. London: Faber & Faber. ISBN 978-0-571-23956-6.
- Gatenby, Phill; Gill, Craig (2011). The Manchester Musical History Tour. Manchester: Empire Publications. ISBN 9781901746716.
- Gimarc, George (2005). Punk Diary: The Ultimate Trainspotter's Guide to Underground Rock 1970–1982. Milwaukee: Backbeat Books. ISBN 0-8793-0848-6.
- Kennedy, Jake (2006). Joy Division and the making of Unknown Pleasures. London: Unanimous Ltd. ISBN 1-903318-80-7.
- Middles, Mick (2002). From Joy Division to New Order. London: Virgin Books. ISBN 978-0-7535-0638-7.
- Robb, John (2010). The North Will Rise Again. Manchester Music City (1977-1996). London: Aurum Press. ISBN 978 1 84513 534 8.
