= The Toggery Five =

- Origin: Manchester, England
- Genres: Freakbeat; R&B
- Years active: 1963–1966
- Labels: Parlophone; Tower
- Past members: Bob Smith; Frank Renshaw; Alan Doyle; Keith Meredith; Ken Mills; Graham Smith; Paul Young; Mick Abrahams; Clive Bunker

The Toggery Five were an English freakbeat band from Manchester, England, that was formed in the midst of the Manchester beat scene. The band emerged as other popular British acts, such as The Hollies and The Dakotas, were also coming to prominence in Manchester. They were the first band to record "I'm Alive", which inspired The Hollies to record the song. The band released two singles, but were never able to achieve success outside the local scene or in the United States. Still, the band members went on to perform in more prominent musical acts.

== History ==
In 1963, the band's original line-up of Bob Smith on lead vocals, Frank Renshaw on lead guitar, Keith Meredith on rhythm guitar, Ken Mills on bass guitar, and Graham Smith on drums. The band formed out of the remains of their past bands, Lee Shondell and the Premiers of Beat and Gaye and the Guys. Renshaw was appointed as the band's leader, because he had had the lengthiest musical career. Mike Cohen, the manager of The Hollies, was impressed by the band's first rehearsal in a pub called "The Thatchers Arms", so he agreed to manage them as well. Their name was based on the clothing store, "The Toggery". The store became a place for groups to acquire clothes, including the Beatles.

The band began playing around Manchester, gaining a local following by playing R&B standards. Renshaw sang the majority of the vocals as Smith could not sing to the style of music, limiting his role to tambourine player. Smith became dissatisfied with losing his spot as lead vocalist and left. In 1964, the band replaced him with Paul Young, who was only 16 years old at the time. Still, with the lack of rehearsals, Young was also limited to tambourine playing, and would not sing on the band's first recording. In September 1964, the band performed on the television show, Ready, Steady, Win, which included judges like Brian Epstein. First prize was a recording contract with Decca Records. The band was able to reach the finals and played the song "Dance with You", but lost to The Bo Street Runners. Initially, the band won the contest, but through intervention by Decca Records, the judges were persuaded to vote them runner-up because the band had signed a contract with the Parlophone label earlier.

On 18 September 1964, the band released their first single, "I'm Gonna Jump" b/w "Bye Bye Bird", which was recorded at Abbey Road Studios. The A-side was based on a man who desired to jump into a river after his girlfriend left him. "I'm Gonna Jump" received positive reviews from critics, but BBC Radio banned its radio play because of the controversy surrounding the theme. As a result, the debut single flopped in England and on its US release on the Tower label. Despite the disappointing sales, the band continued to appear on television and received steady gigs throughout England. They opened for acts like Freddie and the Dreamers and The Hollies. In January 1965, the group returned to Abbey Road Studios for their second single. They recorded "I'd Much Rather Be with the Boys" as their A-side. The Rolling Stones recorded a demo of the song, but did not release it until it was placed on their compilation album, Metamorphosis. This, along with their B-side "It's So Easy", was put out on 26 February 1965 as their second single and it fared better in sales, but, again, failed to chart.

In mid-1965, the band recorded new material for the last time. They received a song from Gene Pitney, called "I'm Alive", because it had been rejected by others. The Hollies heard demos of the song by the band and decided to record a version of their own, which was released two weeks before The Toggery Five's planned distribution. The Hollies achieved a number one hit, preventing the Toggery Five from gaining national success. They were then offered a Hollies' composition, "Going Away", which they recorded but never released. After Renshaw left the band to play behind Wayne Fontana, they regrouped with several new line-ups, until disbanding in 1966. Among the new personnel were Mick Abrahams and Clive Bunker, founding members of the band, Jethro Tull. Paul Young became lead singer with Mike and the Mechanics and died of a heart attack in 2000.

== Discography ==
- "I'm Gonna Jump" b/w "Bye Bye Bird – Parlophone/Tower, 18 September 1964
- "I'd Much Rather Be with the Boys" b/w "It's So Easy" – Parlophone/Tower, 26 February 1965
