= The Cheifs =

Cheifs
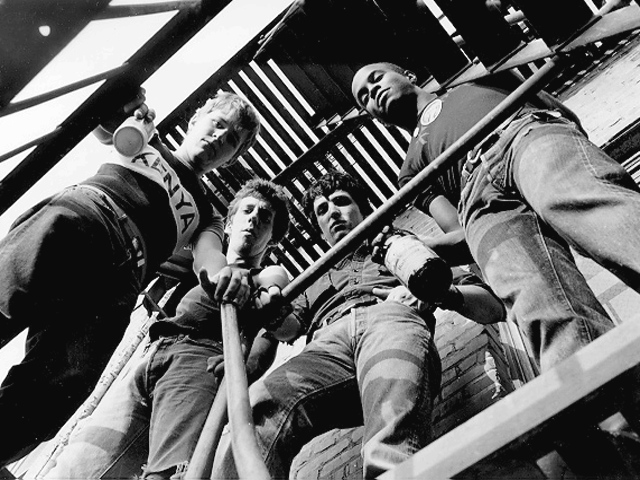

Background information
- Also known as: The Chiefs
- Origin: Hollywood, California, U.S.
- Genre: Punk rock
- Years active: 1979–1982; 2016–present

The Cheifs are an American early punk band, that are often cited as an inspiration to many around the LA punk scene of the late 1970s and early 1980s. Their music predates hardcore and is an aggressive yet melodic bridge. The Cheifs are often cited as the band that bridged the gap between West Coast punk and hardcore. They were a favorite of bands like The Descendents and Bad Religion. Their 45 EP "Blues" (Playgems, 1980) sells for $250 to $400. They have been included on Killed By Death compilations, and in 1997 a CD of their collective works was released.

== History ==
On October 17, 2017, cancer claimed the life of founding band member, Bob Glassley.

=== Formation ===
Hollywood, California, US

- Jerry Koskie – vocals
- George Walker – guitars
- Bob Glassley – bass
- Rabit – drums

=== Recordings ===
- "Blues" (7" single) 1980
- Holly-West Crisis (CD) 1997

Compilations

- Chunks US 12" 1981 (New Alliance): The Lonelys
- Who Cares US LP 1981 (American Standard): No Justice / Riot Squad / Scrapped
- Killed By Death #2 US LP 1989 (Redrum): Blues
- Bloodstains Across California US LP 1993 (Bloodstains): Tower 18

== Current members ==
- Brad Castlen – vocals
- Scott Hedeen – guitars
- Bob Glassley – bass
- James Joyce – drums
