= Do It Dog Style =

1978 album by Slaughter & The Dogs

Studio album by Slaughter and the Dogs
- Released: 1978
- Genre: Punk rock
- Label: Decca
- Producer: Nick Tauber

Professional ratings
Review scores
Source	Rating
AllMusic	2.5/5 stars
Trouser Press	favourable

Do It Dog Style is the first album by Manchester punk band Slaughter and the Dogs.

== Track listing ==
All tracks composed by Wayne Barrett and Mike Rossi except where indicated

Side A

1. "Where Have All the Boot Boys Gone"
2. "Victims of the Vampire" (Rossi, Barrett, Bates)
3. "Boston Babies"
4. "I'm Waiting for the Man" (Lou Reed)
5. "I'm Mad"
6. "Quick Joey Small" (Arthur Resnick, Joey Levine)

Side B

1. "You're a Bore"
2. "Keep on Trying" (Rossi, Bates)
3. "We Don't Care"
4. "Since You Went Away"
5. "Who Are the Mystery Girls" (David Johansen, Johnny Thunders)
6. "Dame to Blame"

== Personnel ==
Slaughter and the Dogs

- Wayne Barrett – vocals
- Mike Rossi – guitar
- Brian "Mad Muffet" Grantham – drums
- Howard "Zip" Bates – bass

with:

- Mick Ronson – guitar on "Quick Joey Small" and "Who Are the Mystery Girls"

Technical

- Adrian Martins – engineer
- Steve McGarry – sleeve illustration
- Kevin Cummins – photography
