= The East Coast Angels =

The East Coast Angels were one of Ireland's early punk groups, forming in Dublin in the 1970s. Their output has been chronicled in Henrik Poulsen's book, 77: The Year of Punk and New Wave.
