= The Roxy (Covent Garden) =

Nightclub in London, England

Coordinates: 51°30′51.98″N 0°7′33.58″W

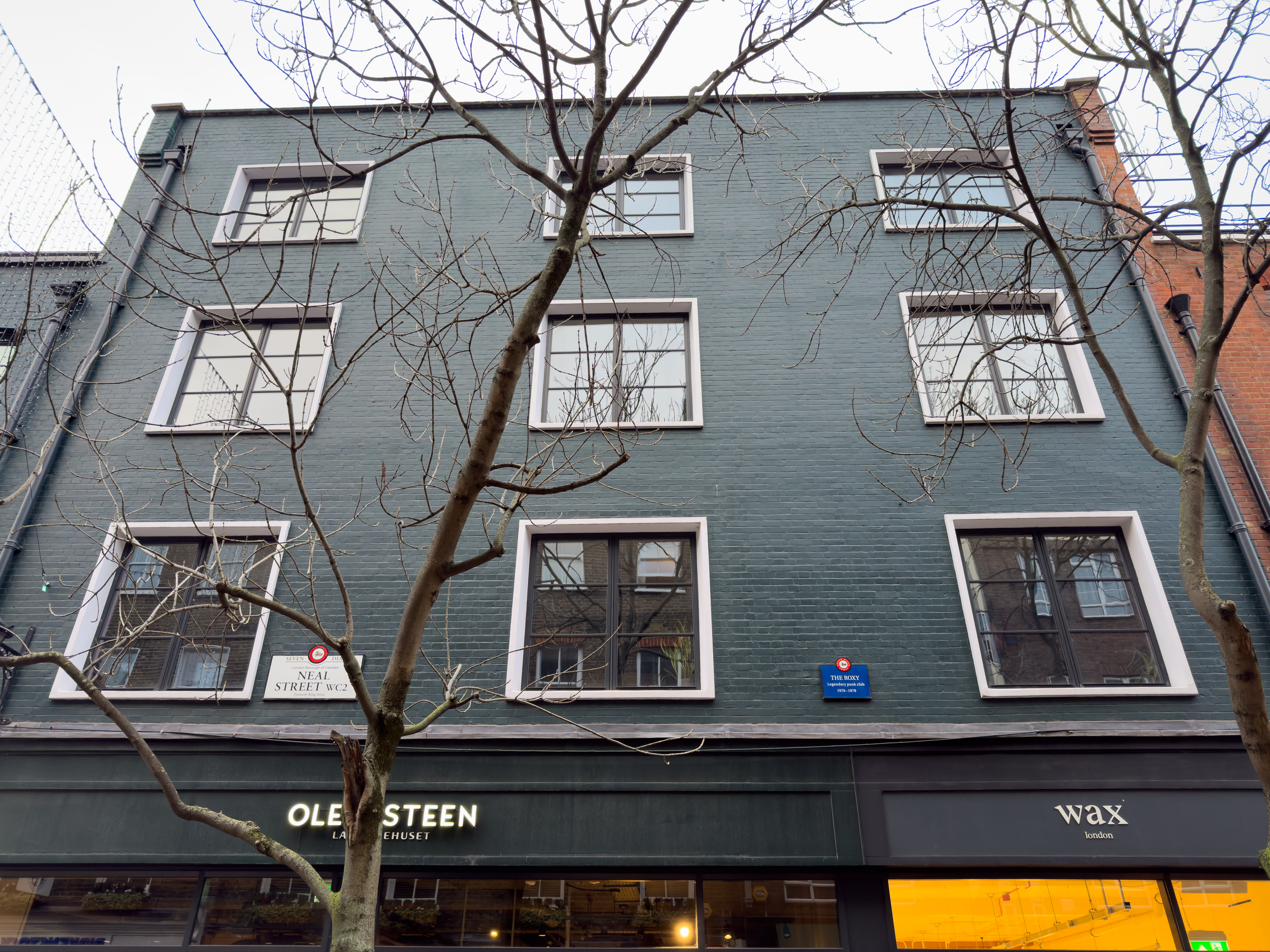
The Roxy building

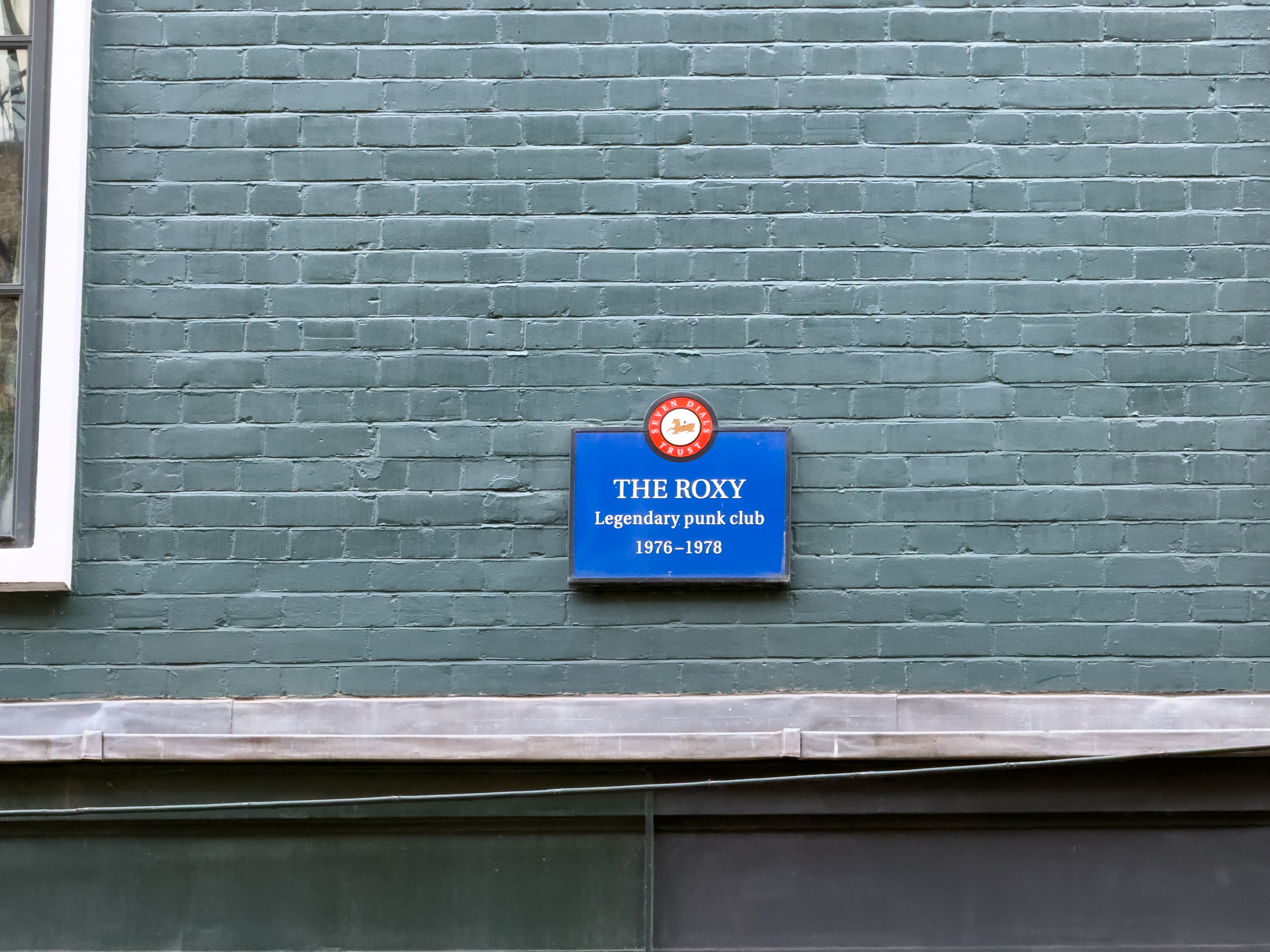
Plaque on the building

The Roxy was a fashionable nightclub located at 41–43 Neal Street in London's Covent Garden, known for hosting the flowering British punk music scene in its infancy.

== History ==
The premises had formerly been used as a warehouse to serve the Covent Garden wholesale fruit and vegetable market. In 1970 they were converted to a late-night bar called the Chaguaramas Club. At that time it was owned by record producer Tony Ashfield, who had several hits with 1970s reggae star John Holt, with whom he formed a company called Chaguaramas Recording Productions, probably after Chaguaramas Bay in Trinidad.

The Roxy was started by Andrew Czezowski, Susan Carrington and Barry Jones, by suggestion of Chelsea singer Gene October, to convert the club into London's first live punk rock venue. The space was small, and spread out on two levels, which contained little more than a bar and a dance floor.

In December 1976, Czezowski organised three gigs at the Roxy. They financed the venture with borrowed money (Jones, a musician, pawned his guitar to stock the bars, and hire sound equipment, etc.). The first show, on 14 December, was Generation X, a band Czezowski managed. The second on the following night was the Heartbreakers. The third, on 21 December, featured Siouxsie and the Banshees and Generation X. However, it was the Clash and the Heartbreakers that headlined the official gala opening on 1 January 1977 which was filmed by Julien Temple and finally screened on BBC Four on 1 January 2015 as The Clash: New Year's Day '77.

The only thing that could count as a "scene" is the Roxy. And the Roxy is a dormitory. The last time I went I was feeling really uppity. I stood in the middle and looked around and all these people were slumped around dozing! I threw tomato sauce on the mirror and stormed out. And I haven't been back there. I don't think I will go back there. The sooner it closes the better.

— Joe Strummer

Don Letts was the resident DJ at the club and he was instrumental in encouraging punk rockers to embrace reggae.

In 1977, Harvest Records released an album Live at the Roxy WC2, featuring some of the regular acts who performed there. The original 12-track album reached No. 24 in the UK Albums Chart and spent five weeks in the chart. A further live album was released in May 1978 of lesser known acts such as the UK Subs, Open Sore, Crabs and the Bears. Since the late 1980s, a number of previously unreleased recordings of Roxy gigs from the late 1970s have been released as live albums including the Buzzcocks (Trojan 1989), the Adverts (Receiver, 1990), X-Ray Spex (Receiver, 1991), and the Boys (Receiver, 1999).

DJ Letts recorded many of the band performances in 1977 at the Roxy, some of which were released the following year as The Punk Rock Movie.

The anarcho-punk band Crass featured the Roxy as the subject of one of their most well known tracks, "Banned from the Roxy", in 1978.

== Site ==
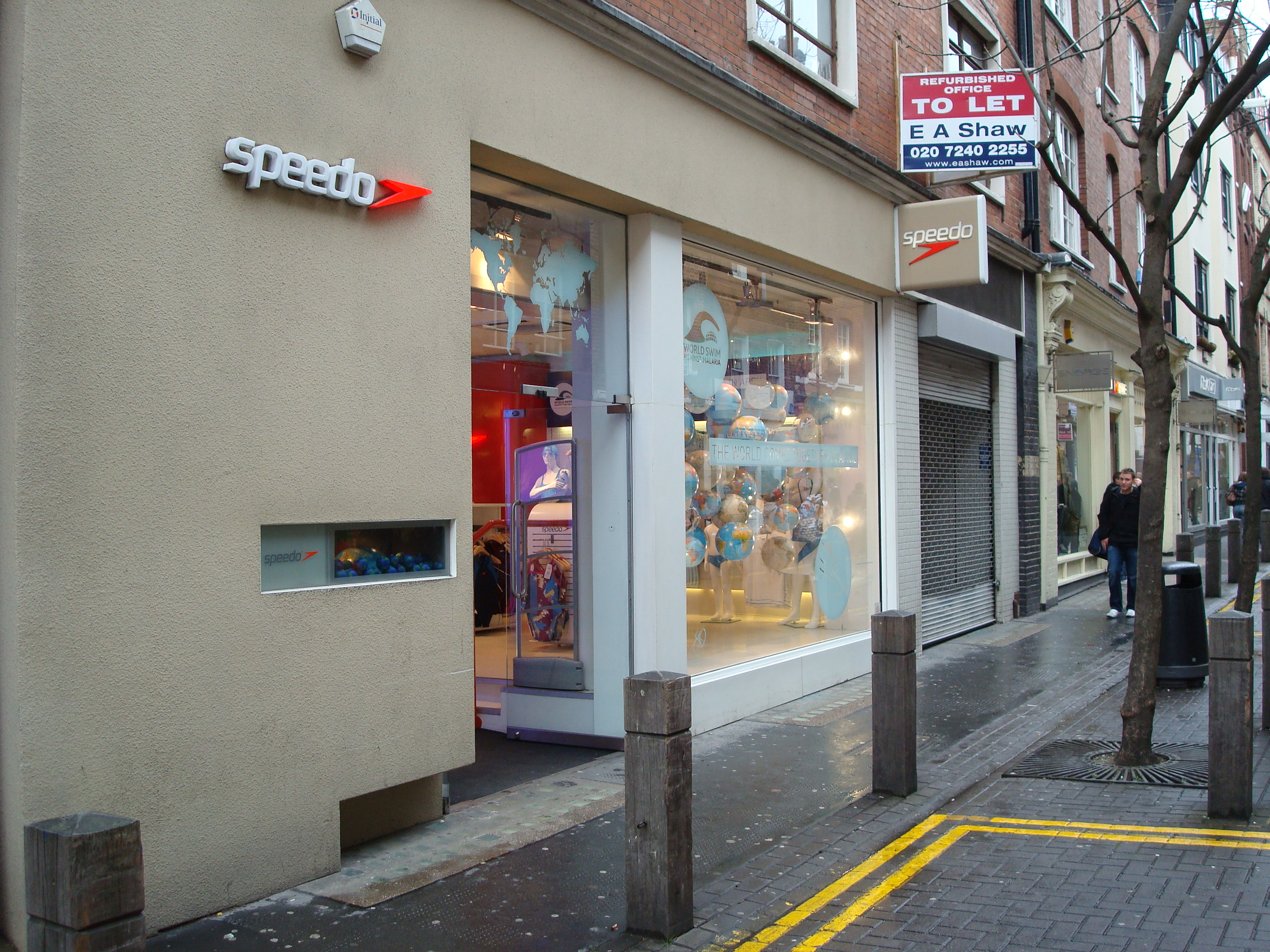
41-43 Neal Street in 2008

The site later became the flagship store for the swimwear brand Speedo.

On Tuesday 25 April 2017, a 'People's Plaque' was unveiled by the Seven Dials Trust and invited unveilers - Andrew Czezowski and Susan Carrington, the founders of the ROXY (with Barry Jones), Gaye Black (The Adverts), Pauline Murray (Penetration), Tessa Pollitt (The Slits) and Jordan Mooney (who worked for Malcolm McLaren and Vivienne Westwood's Sex (boutique)/Seditionaries shop on the King's Road). The plaque is at first-floor level on Neal Street, marking the site of 'The Roxy: legendary punk club, 1976–78'. Andrew Czezowski and Susan Carrington, guests and members of the original bands who played at the club then went onto attend the PV of 'Fear & Loathing at the ROXY' an exhibition of photographs taken mainly during the club's first 100 nights, commissioned by Shaftesbury Plc and curated by artist and historian Jane Palm-Gold. The exhibition comprised the works of Derek Ridgers, Ray Stevenson, Jeremy Gibbs and Rebecca Hale and ran for 3 weeks.

== Bands that played at the Roxy in its first 100 days ==
Bands that appeared there in the first four months of the club's life (January 1977 to April) included:

- 999
- The Adverts
- Alternative TV
- The Boys
- Buzzcocks
- Chelsea
- The Clash
- Cock Sparrer
- The Cortinas
- Wayne County & the Electric Chairs
- The Damned
- The Drones
- Eater
- Generation X
- The Jam
- London
- The Lurkers
- Masterswitch
- The Models (formerly "Beastly Cads")
- Johnny Moped
- The Only Ones
- Penetration
- The Police
- The Rejects
- Sham 69
- Siouxsie and the Banshees
- Skrewdriver
- Slaughter & the Dogs
- The Slits
- Squeeze
- The Stranglers
- Subway Sect
- Johnny Thunders and the Heartbreakers
- The Vibrators
- Cherry Vanilla
- Wire
- X-Ray Spex
- XTC
