= Jon the Postman =

- Born: Jonathan Ormrod; 1956
- Origin: Manchester, England
- Died: July 27, 2015 (aged 58–59)
- Genre: Punk rock
- Occupations: Singer, postman
- Instrument: Vocals
- Label: Bent

Jonathan Ormrod (born 1956), known professionally as Jon the Postman, was an English punk rock singer from Manchester. Among his various jobs, the best known was that of a postman, hence the nickname. Ormrod was present at the Sex Pistols' 4 June 1976 gig at the Lesser Free Trade Hall and was known for getting on stage for various early punk gigs requesting the song "Louie Louie". He opened for groups such as Warsaw (later Joy Division) and the Fall, with Mark E. Smith appearing on his debut single. In 1978, he released his debut album John the Postman's Puerile.

In 2002, he was portrayed by Dave Gorman in the film 24 Hour Party People.

Ormrod died on July 27, 2015 at age 59.

== Early life ==
Jon was a postman in Manchester in the 1970s and later spent years travelling and in various other jobs. He attended the 4 June 1976 Sex Pistols gig at the Lesser Free Trade Hall and was described as "a committed and omnipresent figure on the punk and post-punk scene in Manchester." He first became known for waiting until headline bands had finished their set (sometimes before they had finished) before mounting the stage in a drunken state, grabbing the microphone, and performing his own versions of rock 'n' roll classics such as "Louie Louie". The first time he did this was at a Buzzcocks concert at the Band on the Wall venue on May 2, 1977, which he described:

"I think the Buzzcocks left the stage and the microphone was there and a little voice must have been calling, 'This is your moment, Jon.' I've no idea to this day why I sang 'Louie Louie,' the ultimate garage anthem from the 60s. And why I did it a cappella and changed all the lyrics apart from the actual chorus, I have no idea. I suppose it was my bid for immortality, one of those great bolts of inspiration." "For some reason it appeared to go down rather well. I suppose it was taking the punk ethos to the extreme – anyone can have a go. Before punk it was like you had to have a double degree in music. It was a liberation for someone like me who was totally unmusical but wanted to have a go."

He also became known for his eccentric behaviour at local rock gigs during the late 1970s, including those of acts such as Joy Division and the Fall. He attracted a cult following and became a Manchester celebrity. He played his first gig on May 29, 1977, in support of Warsaw (later Joy Division). After a handful of solo performances, he was joined by local musicians, forming a band and becoming a regular supporting act. When a special concert was held to mark the last night of Manchester's Electric Circus venue (captured on the Virgin Records album Short Circuit: Live at the Electric Circus), with a bill that included Joy Division, The Fall, Steel Pulse, and John Cooper Clarke, he closed the proceedings by performing "Louie Louie" backed by Buzzcocks. He was introduced by Pete Shelley: "That's it from us, but the favourite of all Manchester, the one guy who never appears on the bill but is always there – Jon the Postman". He released two albums, Jon the Postman's Puerile (which was the first record to feature Mark E. Smith, who introduced "Louie Louie." A version of the song by The Fall with Jon on vocals appears on The Fall's Live 1977 album) and Jon the Postman's Psychedelic Rock 'N' Roll 5 Skinners Steppin' Out of Holts' Brewery, both released on Dave Bentley's Bent Records. The first featured an extended version of "Louie Louie," which was described by Stewart Home in his book Cranked Up Really High: Genre Theory and Punk Rock as taking, "the amateurism of the Kingsmen to its logical conclusion with grossly incompetent musicianship and a drummer who seems to be experiencing extreme difficulty simply keeping time," while the second included a similar treatment of Van Morrison's "Gloria". Both albums were reissued on a single CD by Overground Records in 1998. A further recording session known as Jon the Postman's Legendary Lost Session appeared only on a bootleg, although two songs turned up on a long-unavailable compilation LP entitled The Disparate Cognoscenti. They released on The Fall's now-defunct Cog Sinister label, which Jon helped to run (along with The Fall's fan club) while studying for a degree in Politics & History at Salford University. After he lost his job with the GPO, Jon travelled around Europe and spent five years living in San Francisco, before returning to Manchester.

Jon died in 2015.

== Legacy ==
Jon the Postman was portrayed by Dave Gorman in the motion picture 24 Hour Party People.

Jon's antics in taking the stage and his incompetent performances were taken as a reference point for both other musicians and a politician. Mick Middles described how Chris Helme became a member of The Seahorses after regularly mounting the stage in a similar fashion to Jon at performances by a band which included future Seahorses drummer Andy Watts and bass guitarist Stuart Fletcher, where he would, "lurch from the crowd, clutching a bottle in the manner of Manchester punk legend, Jon the Postman, and launch into impromptu vocals." Music writer Steven Wells compared Sarah Palin to Jon the Postman in 2008, comparing Palin's public speaking to Jon's onstage performances. Also in the band were, David Buckley, Tony Turner, Tim Lyons and Mark Harris. Mark Harris died on October 19, 2016, Tony Turner was found dead in Manchester 29 September 2022.

== Discography ==
=== Albums ===
- John the Postman's Puerile (1978), Bent
- Steppin' Out (of Holt's Brewery) (1978), Bent (as John the Postman's Psychedelic Rock 'n' Roll Five Skinners)
- Jon the Postman's Legendary Lost Session (unreleased)

=== Compilation appearances ===
- The Disparate Cogscienti (1988), Cog Sinister – 2 tracks credited to Jon the Postman's Legendary Lost
