= Quick Joey Small (Run Joey Run) =

Single by Kasenetz-Katz Singing Orchestral Circus
- B-side: "(Poor Old) Mr. Jensen"
- Released: September 1968
- Recorded: 1968
- Genre: Bubblegum pop
- Length: 2:23
- Label: Buddah
- Songwriters: Joey Levine and Artie Resnick

"Quick Joey Small (Run Joey Run)," is a bubblegum pop ballad, written by Joey Levine and Artie Resnick and performed by the Kasenetz-Katz Singing Orchestral Circus.

A cover version by Irish group The Real McCoy was a success in Ireland.

== Lyrics ==
The lyrics describe a prisoner who escapes over a wall while weighed down with a ball and chain. He is pursued by a sheriff with hounds. Joey Small's lover, Mary Jane, had sent him a file baked inside a cake; the song ends with the sheriff going to Mary Jane's house — what happens next is left ambiguous.

== Song history ==
The version reached #25 in the US charts. It reached No. 17 in New Zealand.

A cover version by Irish showband group Real McCoy was number one on the Irish Singles Chart for two weeks in January 1969. The B-side was "Happiness Is Love" by Sons & Lovers.
