= Short Circuit: Live at the Electric Circus =

Live album by Various Artists
- Released: 16 June 1978
- Recorded: 1–2 October 1977
- Venue: The Electric Circus, Manchester, England
- Genre: Punk rock, reggae
- Label: Virgin
- Producer: Mike Howlett

Short Circuit: Live at the Electric Circus is a compilation album of songs recorded live at the Electric Circus, Manchester, on 1 and 2 October 1977, two concerts marking the last nights of the venue before it closed. Released by Virgin Records in June 1978, the album was originally only available on 10-inch blue, black, and yellow vinyl.

Warsaw performed on the second night; three months later they changed their name to Joy Division, which is how they are credited on the sleeve.

The album was the debut release for the Fall; Joy Division had self-released their debut 7-inch EP An Ideal for Living just 13 days earlier, and all the other bands had released debuts in 1977.

== Release ==
Some original copies of the album came with a free 7-inch single, "Another Close Shave" by comedian John Dowie.

The album was reissued on CD in 1990 on the Blue Plate label.

== Track listing ==
10" vinyl (Virgin VCL5003)

Side A

1. The Fall: "Stepping Out" – 2:36
2. John Cooper Clarke: "(You Never See a Nipple in The) Daily Express" – 1:03
3. Joy Division: "At a Later Date" – 3:00
4. The Drones: "Persecution Complex" – 2:50

Side B

1. Steel Pulse: "Makka Splaff (The Colly Man)" – 5:45
2. John Cooper Clarke: "I Married a Monster from Outer Space" – 1:30
3. The Fall: "Last Orders" – 3:08
4. Buzzcocks: "Time's Up" – 2:58

== Sources ==
- Gatenby, Phill; Gill, Craig (2011). The Manchester Musical History Tour. Manchester: Empire Publications. ISBN 9781901746716.
- Gimarc, George (2005). Punk Diary: The Ultimate Trainspotter's Guide to Underground Rock 1970–1982. Milwaukee: Backbeat Books. ISBN 0-8793-0848-6.
- Kennedy, Jake (2006). Joy Division and the making of Unknown Pleasures. London: Unanimous Ltd. ISBN 1-903318-80-7.
- Robb, John (2010). The North Will Rise Again. Manchester Music City (1977-1996). London: Aurum Press. ISBN 978-1-84513-534-8.
