= Slaughter & the Dogs =

English punk rock band

Slaughter and the Dogs
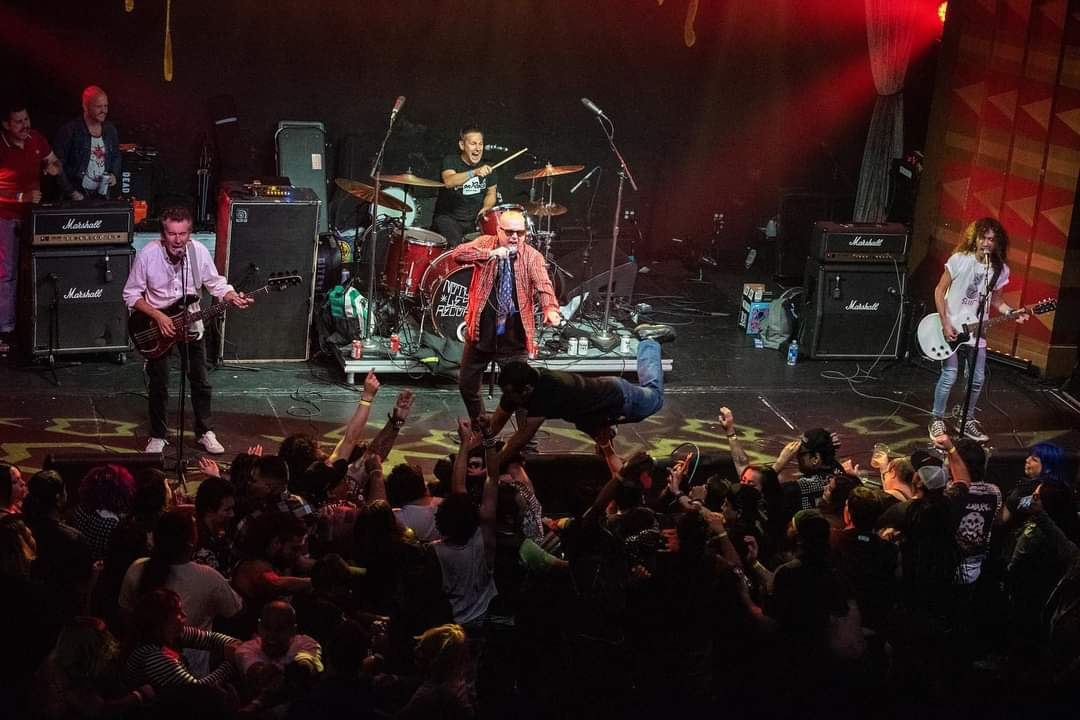
- Slaughter and the Dogs performing in 2023

Background information
- Origin: Wythenshawe, Manchester, England
- Genres: Punk rock, oi!, glam punk, hard rock
- Years active: 1975–1979, 1979–1981, 1996–2025
- Labels: Rabid, Decca, TJM, DJM, Thrush, Damaged Goods, Link, Receiver, Captain Oi!, Taang!, Dodgy Items, Castle, TKO, Amsterdamned, Cleopatra, Contra Europe, Spaghetty Town USA,
- Past members: Wayne Barrett; Michael "Mick" Rossi; Brian "Mad Muffet" Grantham; Howard Bates; Phil Rowland; Nigel Mead; Noel Kay; Jean Pierre Thollet; Dan Graziano; Mark Reback; Mike "Spider" Day

Slaughter and the Dogs are an English punk rock band formed in 1975 in Wythenshawe, Manchester. Their original line-up consisted of singer/creator Wayne Barrett, rhythm guitar Mick Rossi, drummer Brian "Mad Muffet" Grantham, lead guitarist Mike Day and bassist Howard “Master” Zip Bates.

== History ==
Slaughter and the Dogs were founded in 1975 by Wayne Barrett, Mick Rossi, Brian Grantham, Howard Bates and Mike Day. The band name was created by Barrett and is a mix of Slaughter on 10th Avenue and Diamond Dogs. They were one of the first punk rock bands in North West England, and they supported the Sex Pistols at their gig at Manchester Lesser Free Trade Hall on 20 July 1976. This concert, more than any other single event, spawned Manchester's punk scene, which was concentrated around the Electric Circus Club. Mike Day left the group after this gig.

The band befriended Rob Gretton, who went on to manage Joy Division, and with his financial help, became the first band to release a single on Manchester's independent record label Rabid Records. This debut single, "Cranked Up Really High", was released in June 1977 and was listed in Mojo's list of the top 100 punk rock singles of all time. It was also included on Streets, which has been described as an "essential" compilation album of early UK punk bands from a variety of independent record labels.

Slaughter and the Dogs split in 1978 and then reformed late 1979 (including Mick Rossi and new drummer Phil Rowland, formerly of Eater). When Barrett left to pursue other avenues, they recruited Eddie Garrity on vocal duties, were signed to DJM records, and went on to release several singles and an album, Bite Back, under the abbreviated name of Slaughter.

In 2015 promoter Moz Murray announced a one-off 40th anniversary show, "Back to the Start", featuring the original line-up of Barrett, Rossi, Bates and Grantham. Held at the (now permanently closed,) Ruby Lounge in Manchester on 9 October 2015. In August 2016, the same original line up of Barrett, Rossi, Bates and Grantham performed together again at the Rebellion Music Festival in Blackpool, United Kingdom. In 2016, the band recorded the album Vicious in Los Angeles, with a new rhythm section of Mark Reback (drums) and Dan Graziano (bass), and subsequently toured Japan in May 2016 and Europe in February and March 2017. It was released by Cleopatra Records on 16 September 2016, and released to generally favorable reviews. Cleopatra issued a live album, Tokyo Dogs, in 2017.

On 9 February 2017, Slaughter and the Dogs embarked on a seven-week European tour, playing 33 shows in 10 countries.

On 5 August 2018, Slaughter and the Dogs headlined the Rebellion Festival in Blackpool, England. and then embarked on a two-week UK tour.

== Discography ==
=== Studio albums ===
- Do It Dog Style (Decca Records, SKL 5292, May 1978)
- Shocking (Receiver Records, May 1991)
- Beware Of... (Captain Oi! Records, October 2001)
- Vicious (Cleopatra Records, 16 September 2016)
- Il Tradimento Silenzioso (The Silent Betrayal) Contra Records, Spaghetty Town Records, (22 July 2022)
- White Heat (CD/LP/Boxset formats - Cadiz Music, 11th September 2026)

=== Singles ===
- "Cranked Up Really High" / "The Bitch" (Rabid Records, June 1977)
- "Where Have All the Boot Boys Gone?" / "You're a Bore" (Decca Records, September 1977)
- "Dame to Blame" / "Johnny T" (Decca Records, November 1977)
- "Quick Joey Small" / "Come on Back" (Decca Records, February 1978)
- "It's Alright" / "Edgar Allan Poe" / "Twist and Turn" / "UFO" (TJM Records, March 1979)
- "You're Ready Now" / "Runaway" (DJM Records, November 1979)
- Half Alive E.P. ("Twist and Turn" / "Cranked Up Really High" / "Where Have All the Boot Boys Gone?") (Thrush Records, February 1983)
- "Where Have All the Boot Boys Gone?" / "You're a Bore" / "Johnny T" (Damaged Goods, 1988)
- "Saturday Night Till Sunday Morning" (TKO Records, 2001)
- "Situations" / "Quick Joey Small" (Brass City Boss Sounds, 2015)
- "Manchester Boys" / "Where Have All The Boot Boys Gone" (Blighty Records, Nov 2020)

=== Live albums ===
- Live Slaughter Rabid Dogs (Rabid Records, December 1978)
- Live at the Factory (Thrush Records, 1981)
- Where Have All the Boot Boys Gone? (Receiver Records, March 1994)
- Live in Blackpool 1996 (Dodgy Items, 1997)
- Barking Up the Right Tree (Amsterdamned, 1998)
- Tokyo Dogs (Cleopatra Records, 2017)

=== Compilation albums ===
- The Way We Were (Thrush Records, 1983)
- The Slaughterhouse Tapes (Link Records, 1989) – studio outtakes, demos, and live recordings
- Cranked Up Really High (Captain Oi! Records, 1995)
- The Punk Singles Collection (Captain Oi! Records, 2000)
- We Don't Care: Anthology (Castle Music, 2002)
- Best of Slaughter & the Dogs (Taang Records, 2002)
- A Dog Day Afternoon (TKO Records, 2003)

=== Compilation appearances ===
- "Runaway" and "Boston Babies" on Live at the Roxy WC2 (Harvest Records, June 1977) No. 24 UK Albums Chart
- "Cranked Up Really High" on Streets (Beggars Banquet Records, 1977)
- "Where Have All the Bootboys Gone?" ("Cranked Up Really High" on later CD pressings) on the Oi! The Album (EMI, 1980)
- "Cranked Up Really High" on the limited-edition box set of North by North West: Liverpool & Manchester from Punk to Post-Punk & Beyond 1976–1984 (Korova, 2006)
- "Run Rudolph Run" on Punk Rock Christmas (Cleopatra Records, 2015)

== See also ==
- List of punk bands from the United Kingdom
- List of 1970s punk rock musicians

== Books ==
- Rogan, Johnny (31 December 1993). Morrissey & Marr: The Severed Alliance. Omnibus. ISBN 978-0711930001.
- Joynson, Vernon (1 January 2001). Up Yours! A Guide to UK Punk, New Wave & Early Post Punk. Wolverhampton: Borderline Productions. ISBN 978-1899855131.
- Larkin, Colin (1 September 2002). The Virgin Encyclopedia of 70s Music. London: Virgin Books. ISBN 978-1852279479.
- Thompson, Dave (1 August 2000). 20th Century Rock & Roll-PUNK. Ontario, Canada: Collector's Guide Publishing. ISBN 978-1896522272.
- Strong, Martin C. (1 October 2003). The Great Indie Discography. Edinburgh: Canongate Books. ISBN 978-1841953359.
