= Searching for Heaven =

Single by Pauline Murray and the Invisible Girls
- B-side: "Animal Crazy"; "The Visitor"
- Released: April 1981
- Genre: New wave; synth-pop
- Label: Illusive
- Songwriter: Pauline Murray
- Producer: Martin Hannett

Pauline Murray and the Invisible Girls singles chronology
| "Mr X" (1980) | "Searching for Heaven" (1981) |

"Searching for Heaven" is the third and final single by Pauline Murray and the Invisible Girls, released in April 1981 by Illusive Records. It was produced by Martin Hannett.

The title track featured both band-member Wayne Hussey and guest musician Bernard Sumner on guitars, as Vini Reilly, who had played on the album, had left to concentrate on the Durutti Column.

== Track listing ==
=== 7" version ===
==== A-side ====
1. "Searching for Heaven"

==== B-side ====
1. "Animal Crazy"

=== 10" version ===
==== A-side ====
1. "Searching for Heaven"

==== B-side ====
1. "Animal Crazy"
2. "The Visitor"

== Credits ==
- Pauline Murray: vocals
- Robert Blamire: bass
- Steve Hopkins: keyboards
- Wayne Hussey: guitar
- John Maher: drums
- Bernard Sumner: guitar ("Searching for Heaven") (uncredited)
- Martin Hannett: producer
- Martin Atkins: sleeve designer
