= Snap, Crackle & Bop =

Studio album by John Cooper Clarke
- Released: 16 April 1980
- Studio: Arrow (Manchester)
- Genre: Punk poetry
- Length: 38:59
- Label: Epic
- Producer: Martin "Zero" Hannett

John Cooper Clarke chronology
Walking Back to Happiness (1979)	Snap, Crackle & Bop (1980)	Zip Style Method (1982)

The Invisible Girls chronology
Disguise in Love (1978)	Snap, Crackle & Bop (1980)	Pauline Murray and The Invisible Girls (1980)

Professional ratings
Review scores
Source	Rating
AllMusic	4.5/5 stars
Smash Hits	7/10

Snap, Crackle & Bop (stylised as Snap, Crackle [&] Bop) is the fourth studio album by English poet John Cooper Clarke, released on 16 April 1980 through Epic Records. As with Disguise in Love, the album featured The Invisible Girls as the backing band and was produced by Martin Hannett.

The first pressings included a booklet with the lyrics from Clarke's 1978 album Disguise in Love together with photographs and artwork; the booklet was housed in a pocket that formed part of the jacket on the LP cover photograph. The album placed at No. 39 in NME's 1980 Albums of the Year.

== Track listing ==
All tracks are written by John Cooper Clarke, Martin Hannett and Steve Hopkins except where noted.

Side one
No.	Title	Length
1.	"Evidently Chickentown"	2:23
2.	"Conditional Discharge"	3:10
3.	"Sleepwalk"	4:35
4.	"23rd"	3:38
5.	"Beasley Street"	6:56

Side two
No.	Title	Length
1.	"Thirty Six Hours"	3:35
2.	"Belladonna"	4:18
3.	"The It Man"	3:48
4.	"Limbo (Baby Limbo)"	4:31
5.	"A Distant Relation"	3:53

Bonus tracks on 2005 CD reissue
No.	Title	Length
1.	"Beasley Street (live)"	3:28
2.	"Gaberdine Angus (live)"	1:01
3.	"Twat (live)"	2:23

== Charts ==
Chart (1980)	Peak position
Australian (Kent Music Report)	99

== Personnel ==
- John Cooper Clarke – vocals

The Invisible Girls

- Paul Burgess – drums, percussion
- Martin Hannett – bass guitar
- Steve Hopkins – keyboards

Technical

- Paul Welsh, Peter Saville – design
- Bob Elsdale – photography

"Written, played, produced by The Invisible Girls, ably assisted by Lynn Oakey, Pete Shelley, Trevor Spencer, Paul Burgess, Karl Burns, Toby, Dave Hassell, Stephanie Formula. Extra special thanks to Vinnie Riley. The Invisible Girls are the cheese nightmares are Martin Hannett & Steve Hopkins!"
