= Walking Back to Happiness =

Live album (mini-album) by John Cooper Clarke
- Released: 1979
- Recorded: Live, 1979
- Genre: Spoken word
- Label: Epic
- Producer: Martin Hannett

John Cooper Clarke chronology
Disguise in Love (1978)	Walking Back to Happiness (1979)	Snap, Crackle & Bop (1979)

Professional ratings
Review scores
Source	Rating
Music Week	2/4 stars

Walking Back to Happiness is the third album by John Cooper Clarke, released in 1979.

== Description ==
All of the tracks on the album were recorded live, with the exception of the final track, "Gimmix", which was re-recorded in studio and became a UK top 40 hit that year. The penultimate track refers to The Marble Index a 1969 album by Nico.

Walking Back to Happiness is the third album by Clarke. It was originally released on 10" clear vinyl in 1979, and long out of print.

== Track listing ==
All tracks written by John Cooper Clarke.

1. "Gaberdine Angus" - 1:15
2. "Majorca" - 2:28
3. "Bronze Adonis" - 2:22
4. "Spilt Beans" - 2:22
5. "Twat" - 2:24
6. "The Pest" - 2:16
7. "Nothing" - 0:42
8. "Limbo" - 4:21
9. "Who Stole the Marble Index?" - 1:22
10. "Gimmix Play Loud" - 3:26

== Personnel ==
- John Cooper Clarke – vocals

with:

- The Invisible Girls – music on "Gimmix Play Loud"
