= Stage 5 (disambiguation) =

Stage 5 is an unofficial stage at the Walnut Valley Festival in Winfield, Kansas.

Stage 5 may also refer to:

== Arts and entertainment ==
- Stage 5 Rep, a theater company in Columbus
- "Stage 5" (The Sopranos), 79th episode of The Sopranos
- Stage 5, an album in the Everywhere at the End of Time series by the Caretaker

== Sports ==
- 2020–21 Biathlon World Cup – Stage 5
- Stage 5 of the 2021 OpTic Chicago season

== Other uses ==
- Cambrian Stage 5 or Wuliuan, the 5th stage of the Cambrian Period
- Marine Isotope Stage 5
- Stage 5 Chronic Kidney Disease

== See also ==
- Stage 54
- 5 stages (disambiguation)
