= I Wanna Be Yours =

Poem by John Cooper Clark

"I Wanna Be Yours" is a spoken word poem by British poet John Cooper Clarke, on his 1982 album Zip Style Method. The poem was brought to wider audience via an adaptation by Arctic Monkeys on their 2013 album, AM.

== Original lyrics ==
The poetic spoken lyrics recount the love of one person for another, using metaphors around various domestic equipment:

I wanna be your vacuum cleaner
Breathing in your dust
I wanna be your Ford Cortina
I will never rust.

The poem was included in a GCSE English anthology. Clarke re-used the title of the poem for his autobiography published in 2020. In March 2023, The Guardian noted that "if it was previously Britain's favourite wedding poem, it's now quantifiably the world's favourite British poem, full stop".

== Arctic Monkeys adaptation ==
"I Wanna Be Yours"

Song by Arctic Monkeys

from the album AM
- Released: September 9, 2013
- Genre: Indie rock; pop rock; R&B
- Length: 3:04
- Label: Domino
- Composers: Jamie Cook; Matt Helders; Nick O'Malley; Alex Turner
- Lyricist: John Cooper Clarke
- Producer: James Ford

Official audio
- "I Wanna Be Yours" on YouTube

The English rock band Arctic Monkeys brought the poem to a wider audience via an adaptation which appears as the closing track on their 2013 album, AM. The adaptation, produced by James Ford and Ross Orton, contains novel lyrics written by lead singer Alex Turner. It was not released as a single, but the song still gained popularity as part of AM. In September 2026, the recitation reached 4 billion streams on Spotify.

=== Personnel ===
Personnel taken from the AM liner notes.

Arctic Monkeys

- Alex Turner
- Matt Helders
- Jamie Cook
- Nick O'Malley

Additional personnel

- James Ford – production, keyboards
- Ross Orton – co-production
- Ian Shea – engineering
- Tchad Blake – mixing
- Marlon garcia – mastering

=== Weekly charts ===
2013 weekly chart performance for "I Wanna Be Yours"
Chart (2013)	Peak position
UK Streaming (OCC)	39
UK Indie (Official Charts)	42

2021–2024 weekly chart performance for "I Wanna Be Yours"
Chart (2021–2024)	Peak position
Czech Republic Singles Digital (ČNS IFPI)	39
Global 200 (Billboard)	55
Greece International (IFPI)	9
India International (IMI)	2
Ireland (IRMA)	78
Israel (Mako Hitlist)	62
Lithuania (AGATA)	20
Malaysia (Billboard)	21
Netherlands (Single Top 100)	99
Norway (VG-lista)	37
Poland (Polish Streaming Top 100)	51
Portugal (AFP)	26
Slovakia (Singles Digitál Top 100)	44
Sweden (Sverigetopplistan)	66
Switzerland (Schweizer Hitparade)	93
UK Singles (Official Charts)	99
UK Indie (Official Charts)	4

=== Year-end charts ===
2022 year-end chart performance for "I Wanna Be Yours"
Chart (2022)	Position
Lithuania (AGATA)	43

2023 year-end chart performance for "I Wanna Be Yours"
Chart (2023)	Position
Brazil Streaming (Pro-Música Brasil)	199
Global 200 (Billboard)	56
Poland (Polish Streaming Top 100)	47
UK Singles (OCC)	86

2024 year-end chart performance for "I Wanna Be Yours"
Chart (2024)	Position
Global 200 (Billboard)	49
Portugal (AFP)	77

2025 year-end chart performance for "I Wanna Be Yours"
Chart (2025)	Position
Global 200 (Billboard)	71
India International (IMI)	6

=== Certifications ===
Certifications for "I Wanna Be Yours"
Region	Certification	Certified units/sales
Canada (Music Canada)	7× Platinum	560,000^{‡}
Denmark (IFPI Danmark)	Gold	45,000^{‡}
Italy (FIMI)	2× Platinum	200,000^{‡}
New Zealand (RMNZ)	4× Platinum	120,000^{‡}
Portugal (AFP)	5× Platinum	50,000^{‡}
Spain (Promusicae)	Platinum	60,000^{‡}
United Kingdom (BPI)	3× Platinum	1,800,000^{‡}
United States (RIAA)	6× Platinum	6,000,000^{‡}
Streaming
Greece (IFPI Greece)	Diamond	10,000,000^{†}
^{‡} Sales+streaming figures based on certification alone.^{†} Streaming-only figures based on certification alone.

== See also ==
- Evidently Chickentown
- Sleeper hit
