= Zip Style Method =

Studio album by John Cooper Clarke
- Released: 1982
- Recorded: 1982
- Studio: Ridge Farm Studio, Capel, Dorking; Jacobs Farm; Hologram Studios, Stockport
- Genre: Spoken word
- Label: Epic
- Producer: Martin "Zero" Hannett

John Cooper Clarke chronology
Snap, Crackle & Bop (1980)	Zip Style Method (1982)	This Time It's Personal with Hugh Cornwell (2016)

Professional ratings
Review scores
Source	Rating
Allmusic	4/5 stars

Zip Style Method is the sixth album by John Cooper Clarke, originally released in 1982. He is again backed by The Invisible Girls, a band masterminded by producer Martin Hannett, who contributes bass and guitar to the songs.

== Track listing ==
All tracks are written and arranged by John Cooper Clarke, Martin Hannett and Steve Hopkins.

1. "Midnight Shift" - 6:25
2. "New Assassin" - 3:00
3. "The Face Behind the Scream" - 3:34
4. "I Travel in Biscuits" - 3:15
5. "The Day the World Stood Still" - 3:44
6. "A Heart Disease Called Love" - 3:30
7. "The Ghost of Al Capone" - 4:38
8. "Ninety Degrees in My Shades" - 3:37
9. "The Day My Pad Went Mad" - 3:09
10. "I Wanna Be Yours" - 2:02
11. "Drive She Said" - 2:58
12. "Night People" - 3:58

== Personnel ==
- John Cooper Clarke – vocals

The Invisible Girls

- Paul Burgess – drums, percussion
- Steve Williams – bass guitar
- Steve Hopkins – keyboards
- Martin Hannett – bass, guitar
- Richard Darbyshire, Trevor Spencer

Technical

- Laurence Diana, Ken Goodwin, Tim Harris – engineer
- Rosław Szaybo – design
- Niall Doull-Connolly – photography
