= Patrik Fitzgerald =

- Born: Patrick Joseph Fitzgerald; 19 March 1956 (age 70); Stratford, Essex, England
- Genres: Folk punk, punk rock
- Occupation: Singer-songwriter
- Instrument: guitar
- Years active: 1977–present
- Labels: Polydor, Red Flame, Small Wonder, Himalaya, Beat Bedsit, Anagram, Cherry Red
- Website: Patrik Fitzgerald on Facebook

Patrik Fitzgerald (born Patrick Joseph Fitzgerald, 19 March 1956, Stratford, East London) is an English singer-songwriter and an originator of folk punk. The son of working-class Irish immigrant parents, he began recording and performing during the punk rock movement in 1977, after working briefly as an actor.

== Early recordings ==
His early songs were generally short, sarcastic efforts, recorded with just an acoustic guitar and occasional studio effects, with lyrics containing a large amount of social comment. Fitzgerald was soon regarded as an original of his genre, somewhere between a punk-poet and an urban folksinger, and was lauded in some circles as "the new Bob Dylan". After starting out as a busker, he approached David Bowie's original manager, Ken Pitt, requesting his services; Pitt declined but an audition was set up with Noel Gay in 1975 who also turned Fitzgerald down.

In 1976 Fitzgerald auditioned, alongside Mick Jones and Tony James for the band London SS, again without success. After a spell acting in a communal theatre group (9 months in Stratford's The Soapbox Theatre), he drifted towards the developing Punk scene. He was a regular customer at the Small Wonder record shop in London, and when Small Wonder launched a record label Fitzgerald was one of the first to submit a demo – and got a deal, with the new label releasing his first three EPs, the first being Safety-Pin Stuck in My Heart, still his best-known work, and one which he subtitles "a love song for punk music". Patrik became a regular performer at London punk gigs, and supported The Jam on their national tour.

== Polydor era ==
These early recordings attracted interest from Polydor Records who signed him up to record his first LP, Grubby Stories in 1979, recorded with established punk musicians including Robert Blamire of Penetration and John Maher of the Buzzcocks, produced by Peter Wilson. The LP contained 17 tracks, seven of them recorded with these musicians.

Two singles ("All Sewn Up" and "Improve Myself") were released by Polydor, either side of the album and Fitzgerald undertook a tour with a new group of musicians: Colin Peacock (guitar), Charlie Francis (bass) (later to join Toyah), and Rab Fae Beith on drums (later of The Wall and UK Subs).

Fitzgerald appeared in the post-punk documentary Rough Cut and Ready Dubbed in 1979/80 contributing the title song "Island of Lost Souls" and one performance of "Tonight" with Colin Peacock on keyboards.

== Early 1980s ==
After being dropped by Polydor, he continued to play solo acoustic concerts, gradually forsaking the ironic, sarcastic mode for a more deeply etched, darker formulation.

Now without a manager, Fitzgerald returned again to acoustic solo performance, then releasing a single under the pseudonym Josef Garret, then, using a borrowed Revox, he began recording a series of backing tapes to use in live performance. These recordings, based partly on the former group's unreleased material, with Patrik playing everything, were released in 1982 by Red Flame Records as his second album Gifts and Telegrams.

At this point, Patrik Fitzgerald formed a small group of solo performers, working under the banner Ghosts of Individuals, and featuring himself, David Harrow, U.V. Pop (Ultra Violent PØP), Kevin Hewick and Anne Clark (known for her solo albums on Red Flame). The forerunner of London's cabaret scene, the Ghosts, like Fitzgerald's music, was aimed at, and appealed to London's loners.

In 1981, he released a five track 12-inch titled Tonight EP. This recording was credited to a trio, Patrik Fitzgerald Group, comprising Fitzgerald – credited with songs, guitars piano etc., Colin Peacock – credited with synthesizer and guitar, and Lester Broad – credited with saxophone. Engineer was given as abbey. This EP had three tracks on side one – "MR & MRS", "Animal Mentality" and "Tonight". Side two contained "A Superbeing" and "Waiting for the Final Cue".

Following this, in mid-1983, Patrik Fitzgerald formed a collusion with a peripheral musician from the Ghosts, clarinet player Alistair Roberts, and along with three more brass instruments players he recorded his next LP, Drifting Towards Violence. The music on it is mostly acoustic, accompanied by the gloomy sound of the brass section and hard-hitting lyrics. Released by the Belgian label Himalaya the record went completely unadvertised, and, consequently, sank without leaving a trace. The release was followed by a solo tour of Europe, where Fitzgerald has retained a loyal following.

== Return in 1986 ==
In 1986 he released Tunisian Twist, which introduced a radical change of style towards a more commercial sound. The album features a guitar/bass/drums/keyboards band, with a brass section; its sound is thus much fuller than Fitzgerald's previous work. The lyrics deal with subjects as diverse as terrorism, surrogate birth and trade unionism in the climate of Thatcher's "economic realism". While some of the songs are heavy with ironic humour in the manner of Patrik Fitzgerald's early days, there remains the biting incisiveness which has always been his hallmark.

In that year he also contributed a duo with Anne Clark to the compilation LP Abuse – Artists For Animals, dealing with the controversy of bullfights. In the absence of commercial success, Fitzgerald took a job as a waiter at the British House of Commons, before relocating to Normandy in 1988. However, he found himself disenchanted and unable to find gainful employment, and so returned to England three years later.

== 1990s and beyond ==
The early 1990s saw Fitzgerald return to playing gigs again, and he also re-launched an acting career, the most high-profile engagement of which was a version of Molière's The Miser at Stratford.

Seven years after his last release, 1993 saw the release of a new album on Red Flame, Treasures from the Wax Museum, a compilation of early 80s material, with four new tracks.

In 1995 he released Pillow Tension on the Greek label Lazy Dog and relocated to New Zealand. Beat Bedsit Records issued Room Service, a CD with new bedroom recordings, in 2001.

The album Floating Population (2006) was issued to coincide with a European tour with Attila the Stockbroker. It contains a few new songs and alternative versions/recordings of songs spanning his entire career.

Dark Side of the Room (2006) is a split CD with the band POG. It contains 12 tracks by Fitzgerald, mostly versions of old songs.

Spirit of Revolution (2007) is a split 7-inch single with punk poet Attila the Stockbroker. It contains 5 tracks including 2 new Patrik Fitzgerald recordings: The Next Revolution recorded live in Norway and Tired recorded in New Zealand and sent by email to Norway, where industrial classical musicians and the sound of rainfall were added and the track was mixed.

An early rough cut of a documentary called All the Years of Trying directed by Dom Shaw previewed on 6 March 2009 at the Kosmorama Film Festival in Trondheim, Norway. There was also a tribute concert organised on the same day as part of the festival, organised by Crispin Glover Records. The finished film incorporates footage of the tribute gig, an earlier performance at London's historic 12 Bar Club in Tin Pan Alley, and Patrik's music video produced in New Zealand by Ken Clark. The documentary premiered at the Raindance Film Festival on 4 October 2009 and was shown at London's Whitechapel Art Gallery on 24 April 2010 as part of the East End Film Festival.

== Discography ==
=== Albums ===
- Grubby Stories (1979), Polydor
- Gifts and Telegrams (1982), Red Flame
- Drifting Towards Violence (1984), Himalaya
- Tunisian Twist (1986), Red Flame
- Pillow Tension (1995), Lazy Dog
- Room Service (2001), Beat Bedsit
- Floating Population (2006)
- Dark Side of the Room (2006) – split with Pog
- Subliminal Alienation (2012)

Compilations

- Treasures from the Wax Museum (1993), Red Flame
- Safety Pin Stuck in My Heart – The Very Best of Patrik Fitzgerald (1994), Anagram
- Safety Pins, Secret Lives and the Paranoid Ward (The Best of 1977–1986) (2015), Cherry Red

=== Singles, EPs ===
- Safety Pin Stuck in My Heart EP (1977), Small Wonder
- The Backstreet Boys EP (1978), Small Wonder
- The Paranoid Ward/The Bedroom Tapes 12-inch EP (1978), Small Wonder
- The Paranoid Ward 7-inch EP (1978), Small Wonder
- "All Sewn Up" (1979), Polydor
- "Improve Myself" (1979), Polydor
- Tonight EP (1980), Final Solution – UK Indie #24
- "Without Sex/Pop Star, Pop Star" as Josef Garret (1981), Ellie Jay Records
- "Personal Loss" (1982), Red Flame
- Spirit of Revolution EP (2007) Crispin Glover Records – split with Attila the Stockbroker
- No Santa Clauses 7-inch (2021) Crispin Glover Records - featuring Lemur
