= Moving Targets (Penetration album) =

Studio album by Penetration
- Released: October, 1978
- Studio: Matrix Studios, London; The Manor Studios, London
- Genre: Punk rock
- Label: Virgin V2109
- Producer: Mick Glossop, Mike Howlett

Penetration chronology
| Moving Targets (1978) | Coming Up for Air (1979) |

Moving Targets is the debut studio album by English band Penetration, released in 1978 on Virgin.

== Reception ==
Professional ratings
Review scores
| Source | Rating |
|---|---|
| AllMusic | 4.5/5 stars |
| Select | 3/5 medals |
| Trouser Press | favourable |

AllMusic wrote: "Penetration's debut album stands among the very last true greats of the first wave of British punk offerings." Trouser Press wrote: "Penetration's debut LP mixes expansive creations and direct punk-outs, all done with flair and originality. Unlike other LPs by young bands of this era, Moving Targets still sounds surprisingly fresh."

== Track listing ==
1. "Future Daze" (Neale Floyd, Pauline Murray) - 2:58
2. "Life's a Gamble" (Pauline Murray, Gary Chaplin) - 2:59
3. "Lovers of Outrage" (Pauline Murray, Gary Chaplin) - 3:56
4. "Vision" (Robert Blamire, Pauline Murray) - 3:24
5. "Silent Community" (Pauline Murray, Gary Chaplin) - 3:29
6. "Stone Heroes" (Neale Floyd, Pauline Murray, Robert Blamire) - 3:15
7. "Movement" (Robert Blamire, Pauline Murray) - 3:22
8. "Too Many Friends" (Robert Blamire, Pauline Murray, Fred Purser) - 3:13
9. "Reunion" (Neale Floyd, Pauline Murray) - 3:59
10. "Nostalgia" (Pete Shelley) - 3:49
11. "Freemoney" (Patti Smith, Lenny Kaye) - 4:48

== Personnel ==
Penetration

- Pauline Murray - vocals
- Gary Chaplin - guitar
- Fred Purser - lead guitar; keyboards on "Reunion"
- Neale Floyd - guitar
- Robert Blamire - bass
- Gary Smallman - drums, percussion

Technical

- Mick Glossop - engineer
- Robert Mason, Russell Mills - sleeve artwork
- Paul Nugent - sleeve photography
