= The Invisible Girls =

British rock band

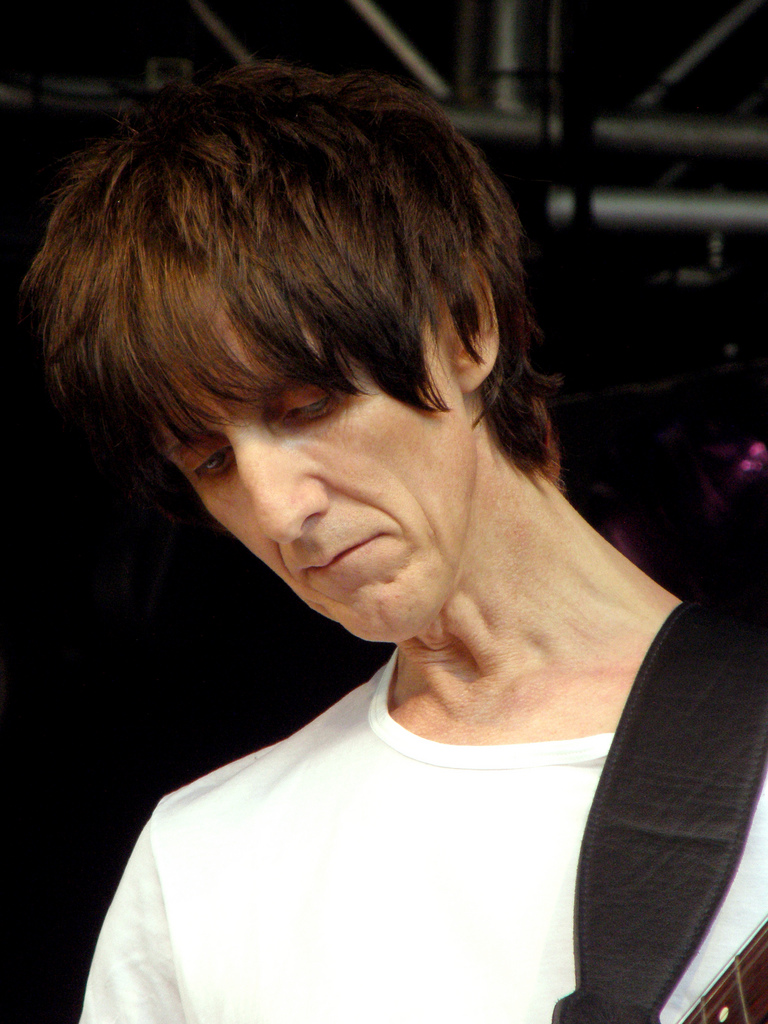
- Guitarist Vini Reilly

Background information
- Origin: Salford, Greater Manchester, England
- Genres: Post-punk; synth-pop; gothic rock
- Years active: 1978–c. 1982
- Labels: Factory; Illusive; Epic
- Past members: Martin Hannett; Steve Hopkins; Paul Burgess; Lyn Oakey; John Scott; Robert Blamire; Vini Reilly; Dave Rowbotham; John Maher; Dave Hassell; Wayne Hussey

The Invisible Girls were a British rock band formed in Salford, Greater Manchester in 1978 to provide a musical backdrop to the recorded output of Salford punk poet John Cooper Clarke. The band's nucleus was Joy Division and New Order producer Martin Hannett and keyboardist Steve Hopkins, with contributions from Pete Shelley of Buzzcocks and Bill Nelson of Be-Bop Deluxe, amongst others.

The band played on the debut solo studio album by Pauline Murray (lead vocalist of Penetration), the eponymous Pauline Murray and the Invisible Girls and some singles, and later with Nico for her 1982 single "Procession".

== History ==
The Invisible Girls was a band formed in Salford, Greater Manchester, in 1978, to provide backing music for punk poet John Cooper Clarke. It initially featured Factory Records producer Martin Hannett on bass guitar, Steve Hopkins on keyboards, 10cc drummer Paul Burgess, and guitarist Lyn Oakey. This line-up played on Cooper Clarke's debut album Où est la maison de fromage?, before they named themselves the Invisible Girls.

Disguise in Love (billed as being by "John Cooper Clarke with the Invisible Girls") was produced by Hannett and released in 1978, and featured collaborations with Be-Bop Deluxe's Bill Nelson and Buzzcock Pete Shelley. John Scott was also either a collaborator or full-time member. A second album, Snap, Crackle & Bop, followed in 1980.

=== Pauline Murray ===
In 1980, the band began to work with Pauline Murray, who in the same year dissolved her punk band Penetration. Burgess had left The Invisible Girls by this point to dedicate more time to 10cc. During Murray's period with the band, Hannett worked as producer, being replaced on bass by Robert Blamire, also a former member of Penetration.

The band's first single, "Dream Sequences", was released in August 1980, featuring Murray, Hannett, Hopkins, Blamire, and Alan Rawlings from Cowboys International as guest guitarist. Shortly afterwards, the line-up was extended to the Durutti Column's Vini Reilly and Dave Rowbotham (then with the Mothmen) on guitar, Dave Hassell on percussion plus John Maher from Buzzcocks on drums. They released an eponymous album in September, followed by a second single, "Mr X", in November 1980.

To perform live, the band recruited guitarist Wayne Hussey (ex-Walkie Talkies), who had answered an advertisement in the Melody Maker magazine. The band (comprising Murray, Blamire, Hopkins, Hannett, Maher, and Hussey) recorded a final single, "Searching For Heaven", which they released in 1981: the A-side featured (but did not credit) Bernard Sumner as guest guitarist. After this, Hannett and Hopkins continued as the only remaining members, with Paul Burgess re-joining.

Murray and Blamire went on to form the Storm and Hussey joined Dead or Alive. Maher (after the demise of the Buzzcocks in early 1981) continued with his new band, Flag of Convenience and Reilly continued with The Durutti Column. Rowbotham continued with The Mothmen for a short time but was murdered in 1991.

=== Later projects ===
In 1982, the band returned to work with John Cooper Clarke; his final album, Zip Style Method, was released the same year.

At the time, Nico, former singer with the Velvet Underground, was living in Manchester, and she worked with the band. They released only one single, "Procession", produced by Hannett. The title track featured Toby Toman (formerly of the Nosebleeds and Ludus) on drums. The B-side, a cover of "All Tomorrow's Parties", featured Burgess on drums. Shortly afterwards, Nico and Toby went to work with Blue Orchids.

== Discography ==
=== Albums ===
- Disguise in Love (1978)
- Snap, Crackle & Bop (1980)
- Pauline Murray and the Invisible Girls (September 1980)
- Zip Style Method (1982)
- Martin Hannett and Steve Hopkins: The Invisible Girls (2015)

=== Singles ===
- "Dream Sequences" (Illusive, August 1980)
- "Mr X" (Illusive, November 1980)
- "Searching for Heaven" (Illusive, April 1981)
- "Procession" (as Nico & The Invisible Girls) (1/2, 1982)
