= Luxury Lounge =

- The Sopranos episode
- Episode no.: Season 6 Episode 7
- Directed by: Danny Leiner
- Written by: Matthew Weiner
- Cinematography by: Phil Abraham
- Production code: 607
- Original air date: April 23, 2006
- Running time: 55 minutes

Episode chronology
← Previous "Live Free or Die"	Next → "Johnny Cakes"
- The Sopranos season 6

"Luxury Lounge" is the 72nd episode of the HBO original series The Sopranos and the seventh of the show's sixth season. Written by Matthew Weiner and directed by Danny Leiner, it originally aired on April 23, 2006.

== Starring ==
- James Gandolfini as Tony Soprano
- Lorraine Bracco as Jennifer Melfi *
- Edie Falco as Carmela Soprano
- Michael Imperioli as Christopher Moltisanti
- Dominic Chianese as Corrado Soprano, Jr. *
- Steven Van Zandt as Silvio Dante
- Tony Sirico as Paulie Gualtieri
- Robert Iler as Anthony Soprano, Jr. *
- Jamie-Lynn Sigler as Meadow Soprano *
- Aida Turturro as Janice Soprano Baccalieri *
- Steven R. Schirripa as Bobby Baccalieri
- Frank Vincent as Phil Leotardo
- John Ventimiglia as Artie Bucco
- Ray Abruzzo as Little Carmine Lupertazzi
- Kathrine Narducci as Charmaine Bucco
- Dan Grimaldi as Patsy Parisi

* = credit only

=== Guest starring ===
- Ben Kingsley as himself
- Lauren Bacall as herself
- Frankie Valli as Rusty Millio
- Edoardo Ballerini as Corky Caporale
- Denise Borino as Ginny Sacrimoni
- Elizabeth Bracco as Marie Spatafore
- Max Casella as Benny Fazio
- Manuela Feris as Martina
- Arthur J. Nascarella as Carlo Gervasi
- Artie Pasquale as Burt Gervasi
- Suzanne Shepherd as Mary DeAngelis
- Wilmer Valderrama as himself
- Maureen Van Zandt as Gabriella Dante
- Lenny Venito as James "Murmur" Zancone
- Nick Annunziata as Eddie Pietro
- Carlo Giuliano as Italo
- Peter Allas as Salvatore
- Taleb Adlah as Ahmed
- Donnie Keshawarz as Muhammad
- Brian O'Neill as Detective Hollings
- John Rue as Kloski
- Merel Julia as Gianna Millio
- Kristen Cerelli as Jen Fazio
- Mario D'Elia as Benny Fazio, Sr.
- Judy Prianti as Connie Fazio
- Dierdre Friel as Sandy
- Abigail Marlowe as Sarah
- Enya Flack as Janine
- Alicia Lorén as Eden
- Sig Libowitz as Hillel Teittleman
- John Bianco as Gerry Torciano
- John "Cha Cha" Ciarcia as Albie Cianflone
- Frank Borrelli as Vito Spatafore, Jr.
- Paulina Gerzon as Francesca Spatafore
- Ariana Delawari as Shelly
- Jose Sanchez as Hector
- Filippo Bozotti as Giovanni Coppito

== Synopsis ==
Corky Caporale provides the two Italian hitmen hired to kill Rusty with "clean" pistols and directions to his location; they kill Rusty and his bodyguard.

At Nuovo Vesuvio, Phil and Tony celebrate the induction of Gerry and Burt Gervasi into their respective crime families. During the party, there are mutters about the deteriorating quality of the restaurant. Tony later has a meal at Da Giovanni, a highly successful rival restaurant. Artie is facing problems at Nuovo Vesuvio: it is losing money and there are tensions with Benny, who is flirting with the new Albanian hostess, Martina. While nursing a drink at the Bada Bing, Artie confronts Tony about dining at Da Giovanni; to provoke him, he alludes to his habitual adultery. Tony does not yield. When he offers some tips to increase the restaurant's popularity, Artie angrily rebuffs him and suggests he settle his outstanding tab if he wants to help. Later, Artie rejects his wife Charmaine's suggestions to stop bothering his guests with table-side visits.

Fraud investigators for American Express visit Nuovo Vesuvio because someone is stealing credit card numbers from Artie's customers, and the restaurant's card usage has to be suspended. Artie learns Martina helped Benny steal the numbers and fires her. He then goes to Benny's house in the middle of the night and provokes a fistfight; Benny is left bleeding on his porch. Tony meets separately with the two men and compels them to make peace. At Tony's insistence, Benny's parents have their anniversary dinner at Nuovo Vesuvio. Artie visits them during their meal. In front of his pregnant wife, Artie offers Benny a "martina", explaining that it is an Albanian martini that "goes down real easy". An enraged Benny follows Artie into the kitchen and forces his right hand into a boiling pot of tomato sauce.

Christopher asks Tony's permission to fly to Los Angeles with Little Carmine to cast actors for Cleaver, and Tony reluctantly consents. While he is away, Murmur makes rounds for Chris; they include delivering card numbers to Ahmed and Muhammad, who are stealing money via the Internet. Benny takes over Chris' credit card operation, giving a cut to Tony.

In L.A., Chris and Little Carmine have a scheduled meeting with Ben Kingsley. He is not interested in Cleaver and interrupts Chris and Carmine to speak to Lauren Bacall, who is to be a presenter at an award show. Chris and Carmine then tag along with him, and Chris is astounded by the great quantity of free expensive luxury items the actor is offered. Chris later phones Kingsley, unsuccessfully asking him to arrange for Chris himself to enter their hotel's Luxury Lounge.

When Kingsley turns down Cleaver, Chris summons Murmur to L.A.; he finds Chris intoxicated in his hotel room. Once he sobers up, the two corner Kingsley in an elevator and try to subtly intimidate him into giving them access to the Luxury Lounge. Kingsley blurts out that award presenters get free goods worth around $30,000. Outside the awards show Chris, masked, mugs Bacall, stealing her gift bag. At home, he offers Tony some of the stolen goods, but Tony is more concerned with Chris' lack of focus, blaming his absence for the feud between Artie and Benny.

== Deceased ==
- Rusty Millio: assassinated on orders from Johnny "Sack" via Tony Soprano's enlisted hit men from Italy for potentially trying to take power away from Johnny again.
- Eddie Pietro: collateral damage from the Millio hit.
- An eastern cottontail: Shot by Artie Bucco while eating the vegetables in his garden.

== Production ==
- Creator David Chase makes his second cameo appearance on the series as a passenger on the plane to Italy during the last scene. Previously, he appeared as a man in Italy in the episode "Commendatori."

== Music ==
- The song being played at Nuovo Vesuvio when Artie surveys his mostly empty establishment is "La-La (Means I Love You)" by The Delfonics.
- The song being sung by Murmur when making the credit card collection from the Jewish-owned hotel is "Daniel" by Elton John.
- The song playing at the Bada Bing! where Ahmed and Muhammad get the stolen credit card numbers is "Dazz," a 1976 hit song by Brick.
- The song playing at the Bada Bing when Artie confronts Tony about dining at Da Giovanni is "The Fire of Love" by The Barbarellatones.
- The song playing at the Luxury Lounge when Christopher looks around at the swag is "Welcome to New York City" by Cam'ron, from the True Crime: New York City's intro, briefly shown in the TV.
- When Artie meets the Benny Fazio party in his restaurant the song playing is "Whispering Bells" by The Del-Vikings.
- Closing credits music is a classical guitar piece called "Recuerdos de la Alhambra," composed by Francisco Tarrega and played by Pepe Romero.

== Reception ==
Television Without Pity graded the episode with an A−. The A.V. Club graded it with a B−: "...unusually direct for the show, and it's part of the show's occasional dips into Hollywood satire." Star-Ledger critic Alan Sepinwall found that the focus on Artie was on "the one character who historically gets less respect...than Bobby Bacala" and considered the episode filler, "fairly slow and quiet". However, Sepinwall praised the character development of Artie as "the honest man in the dirty town, the guy who struggles trying to do things the right way," in contrast to Tony "rolling in crooked cash." Similarly, Lisa Schwarzbaum of Entertainment Weekly praised the character development in this episode and season six: "...we care about so many characters, major and minor, that whether we see them or not from week to week, it's easy to believe they're living their lives, just off screen."
