= John Maher (Buzzcocks drummer) =

British drummer

- Born: 21 April 1960 (age 66)
- Origin: Manchester, England
- Genres: Punk rock, new wave, post-punk
- Occupations: Musician, photographer, engineer, car racer
- Instrument: Drums
- Years active: 1976–1992; 2012–present

John Maher (born 21 April 1960) is a British musician who was part of the punk and new wave scenes in Manchester, England, most notably as the drummer with Buzzcocks.

== Music career ==
Maher's father and mother were from Castledermot, Athy, Kildare, Ireland. In 1976, still a 16-year-old schoolboy from St Bede's College, Whalley Range, Manchester, he joined punk band Buzzcocks, then led by Howard Devoto, who was the lead vocalist. After the first Buzzcocks dissolving in 1981, he collaborated with Pauline Murray of The Invisible Girls, and formed along with Steve Diggle (also of Buzzcocks) a band called Flag of Convenience, in 1982, but he quit shortly afterwards. In 1981, he was drumming with Pete Wylie in Wah!

Buzzcocks reunited in late 1989 for a month long tour of the US and seven shows in the UK. While the other members of the band decided to continue, Maher left to continue with his VW business (see below). He returned once more in early 1992, when his replacement (Mike Joyce, formerly of The Smiths), quit Buzzcocks on the eve of a European and Japanese tour.

In May 2012, Maher stepped out of musical retirement to rejoin Buzzcocks for two one-off shows: his first public appearance behind a drum kit in 20 years. The concerts took place at Manchester Apollo and London's Brixton Academy. Howard Devoto, the band's original vocalist also joined the band on stage for five songs – all four tracks from their debut EP, Spiral Scratch, plus a cover version of The Troggs' "Can't Control Myself". Maher spoke about his brief return to the stage in an interview with online fanzine Mudkiss. Another interview with Maher appears in the first issue of The Drummers Journal.

In 2014, Maher reunited with another Manchester band he had previously been involved with during his Buzzcocks years: The Things. The band recorded several songs, both old and new, in 2014. An EP (entitled EP1) containing four tracks was released in mid 2015.

In 2015, Maher was back in the recording studio with old friends Pauline Murray and Robert Blamire, working on a new Penetration album – the first since the band's 1979 release, Coming Up For Air. Maher and Blamire first worked together in 1978, on Patrik Fitzgerald's debut album Grubby Stories. In 1980 they also worked together on the Martin Hannett produced Pauline Murray and the Invisible Girls album. The new album Resolution took the runner-up spot in Vive Le Rock's Top 50 albums of 2015.

In August 2015, the website Louder Than War published an in-depth interview with Maher.

== Drag racing ==
When Maher first quit the music industry in the 1980s, he developed an interest in car drag racing, racing VW Beetles as part of the VWDRC. This led him to develop a successful business, John Maher Racing, building performance engines. After reuniting with Buzzcocks in 1989, he retired from music in 1992 after a tour, and returned to his Volkswagen business in Chorlton-cum-Hardy, in the south of Manchester. In 1999, Maher's workshop was featured in the Channel 5 programme Stars & Cars. This featured footage of his former incarnation as a drummer, a tour of his workshop, and interviews.

Maher relocated his business from Manchester to the Isle of Harris in Scotland in 2002. In 2010 he appeared on the BBC Alba motoring programme Air an Rathad. The interview features footage inside his workshop on the Isle of Harris, a brief interview and a drive in a customer's Beetle.

== Photography ==
Since 2009, Maher has gained recognition for his photography; in particular, he is known for his long-exposure night photographs and interior images of abandoned Hebridean homes.
