= Où est la maison de fromage? =

Où Est La Maison De Fromage?

Studio album by John Cooper Clarke
- Released: 1978
- Genre: Spoken word
- Label: Rabid
- Producer: Martin Hannett

John Cooper Clarke chronology
Où Est La Maison De Fromage? (1978)	Disguise in Love (1978)

Professional ratings
Review scores
Source	Rating
Allmusic	link

Où est la maison de fromage (English: "Where is the cheese house?") is the debut album by John Cooper Clarke, originally released in 1978.

== Description ==
The album comprises a mix of live performances, demos, and rehearsals.

The French-language title, Où est la maison de fromage means "Where is the cheese house?".

Clarke has criticised the record company Rabid for releasing the album, claiming it was done without his consent, and declaring in his autobiography: "If you love me, throw it away."

== Re-release ==
To celebrate Record Store Day in 2016, the album was released on orange vinyl, one of 557 releases that day.

== Track listing ==
All tracks written by John Cooper Clarke except where noted

1. "The Time Machine Pt. 1" – 1:43
2. "Letter to Fiesta" – 1:01
3. "Film Extra's Extra" – 3:46
4. "Majorca" – 1:41
5. "Action Man" – 1:09
6. "Kung Fu International" – 1:48
7. "Sperm Test" – 1:05
8. "Missing Persons" – 1:56
9. "Split Beans" – 4:13
10. "Dumb Row Laughs" – 0:50
11. "Bunch of Twigs" – 0:33
12. "Trains" – 0:45
13. "The Cycle Accident" – 1:18
14. "Gimmix" – 3:01
15. "Readers Wives" – 1:14
16. "Ten Years in an Open Neck Shirt, Pt. 1"
17. "Nothing"
18. "(I Married A) Monster from Outer Space"
19. "Ten Years in an Open Neck Shirt, Pt. 2"
20. "Daily Express (You Never See a Nipple In)"
21. "Ten Years in an Open Neck Shirt, Pt. 3"
22. "Salome Malone"
23. "Psycle Sluts, Pt. 1"

== Personnel ==
- John Cooper Clarke – vocals
- Paul Burgess – drums, percussion
- Martin Hannett – bass guitar
- Steve Hopkins – keyboards
