= Disguise in Love =

Studio album by John Cooper Clarke
- Released: 1978
- Recorded: 1978
- Venues: Ritz Ballroom, Manchester
- Studios: Arrow Studios, Manchester
- Genre: Spoken word
- Length: 39:29
- Label: CBS
- Producer: Martin "Zero" Hannett

John Cooper Clarke chronology
Où est la maison de fromage? (1978)	Disguise in Love (1978)	Walking Back to Happiness (1979)

Professional ratings
Review scores
Source	Rating
Allmusic	4/5 stars

Disguise in Love is the second studio album by the English punk-poet John Cooper Clarke, released in 1978. The music for most of the tracks was provided by Clarke's band The Invisible Girls, except "Psyche Sluts 1&2" and "Salome Maloney" — both live recordings from the Ritz Ballroom in Manchester on 8 May 1978.

The album contains one of Cooper's best-known tracks, "(I Married a) Monster from Outer Space".

== Track listing ==
All tracks are written by John Cooper Clarke, Martin Hannett and Steve Hopkins except where noted.

Side one
No.	Title	Writer(s)	Length
1.	"I Don't Wanna Be Nice"		3:58
2.	"Psycle Sluts 1&2"	Clarke	3:12
3.	"(I've Got a Brand New) Tracksuit"		1:51
4.	"Teenage Werewolf"		3:57
5.	"Readers Wives"		3:13

Side two
No.	Title	Writer(s)	Length
1.	"(I Married a) Monster from Outer Space"		3:32
2.	"Salome Maloney"	Clarke	2:08
3.	"Health Fanatic"		5:42
4.	"Strange Bedfellows"		4:10
5.	"Valley of Lost Women"		4:19

== Charts ==
Chart (1979)	Peak position
Australian (Kent Music Report)	100

== Personnel ==
- John Cooper Clarke – vocals

The Invisible Girls

- Paul Burgess – drums, percussion
- Martin Hannett – bass guitar, synthesizer programming
- Steve Hopkins – keyboards, synthesizer programming

with:

- Lyn Oakey – guitar (tracks 4, 5, 6, 10)
- Bill Nelson – guitar (tracks 1, 5, 9)
- John Scott – guitar (track 3)
- Pete Shelley – guitar (tracks 1, 4, 7, 10)
