= Beasley Street =

"Beasley Street" is a poem by the English poet John Cooper Clarke. Dealing with poverty in inner-city Salford, Cooper Clarke has said that the poem was inspired by Camp Street in Lower Broughton. It has a relentless theme of squalor and despair:

The rats have all got rickets
They spit through broken teeth
The name of the game is not cricket
Caught out on Beasley Street

The poem is similar in theme to "An Elementary School Classroom in a Slum" by Stephen Spender published in his New Collected Poems (1964).

A recitation of the poem appears on Cooper Clarke's 1980 album Snap, Crackle & Bop. When it was released, BBC radio stations censored the line "Keith Joseph smiles and a baby dies/ In a box on Beasley Street."

In the 2010s Cooper Clarke has performed a "sequel" poem, "Beasley Boulevard" which deals with urban regeneration and mentions Urban Splash.
