= Stage 5 (The Sopranos) =

- The Sopranos episode
- Episode no.: Season 6 Episode 14
- Directed by: Alan Taylor
- Written by: Terence Winter
- Cinematography by: Alik Sakharov
- Production code: 614
- Original air date: April 15, 2007
- Running time: 56 minutes

Episode chronology
← Previous "Soprano Home Movies"	Next → "Remember When"
- The Sopranos season 6

"Stage 5" is the 79th episode of the HBO television series The Sopranos, the second episode of the second half of the show's sixth season, and the 14th episode of the season overall. The main plot is about Christopher Moltisanti's horror movie premiering in New York City, with a subplot about Johnny Sack learning that he is terminally ill.

Written by Terence Winter and directed by Alan Taylor, the episode originally aired on April 15, 2007, and it led the U.S. cable television ratings for the week ending April 15. Critical reviews were generally positive, especially regarding the use of tragic humor.

== Starring ==
- James Gandolfini as Tony Soprano
- Lorraine Bracco as Dr. Jennifer Melfi
- Edie Falco as Carmela Soprano
- Michael Imperioli as Christopher Moltisanti
- Dominic Chianese as Corrado Soprano, Jr. *
- Steven Van Zandt as Silvio Dante
- Tony Sirico as Paulie Gualtieri
- Robert Iler as Anthony Soprano, Jr.
- Jamie-Lynn Sigler as Meadow Soprano
- Aida Turturro as Janice Soprano Baccalieri
- Steven R. Schirripa as Bobby Baccalieri
- Vincent Curatola as Johnny "Sack" Sacrimoni
- Frank Vincent as Phil Leotardo
- Ray Abruzzo as Little Carmine Lupertazzi
- Sharon Angela as Rosalie Aprile
- Dan Grimaldi as Patsy Parisi

* = credit only

=== Guest starring ===
- Jerry Adler as Hesh Rabkin

==== Also guest starring ====
- Sydney Pollack as Warren Feldman
- Peter Bogdanovich as Dr. Elliot Kupferberg
- Daniel Baldwin as himself/Sally Boy
- Jonathan LaPaglia as Michael the Cleaver
- Gregory Antonacci as Butch DeConcini
- John Bianco as Gerry Torciano
- Denise Borino as Ginny Sacrimoni
- Cara Buono as Kelli Lombardo Moltisanti
- John "Cha Cha" Ciarcia as Albie Cianflone
- Dan Conte as Faustino "Doc" Santoro
- Miryam Coppersmith as Sophia Baccalieri
- Tim Daly as J.T. Dolan
- Tony Darrow as Lawrence "Larry Boy" Barese
- Michael Kelly as Agent Ron Goddard
- Marianne Leone as Joanne Moltisanti
- Geraldine LiBrandi as Patty Leotardo
- Lou Martini Jr. as Anthony Infante
- Angelo Massagli as Bobby Baccalieri III
- Christopher McDonald as Eddie Dunne
- Cristin Milioti as Catherine Sacrimoni
- Arthur J. Nascarella as Carlo Gervasi
- Dania Ramirez as Blanca Selgado
- Anthony J. Ribustello as Dante Greco
- Geraldo Rivera as himself
- Matt Servitto as Agent Dwight Harris
- Caitlin Van Zandt as Allegra Marie Sacrimoni
- Maureen Van Zandt as Gabriella Dante
- Matthew Weiner as Manny Safier
- John Wu as Morgan Yam
- Seth Barrish as Dr. Uri Rosen
- Jerry Capeci as himself
- Maulik Pancholy as Dr. Ajit Gupte
- Kevin McKelvey as U.S. Marshal Lawrence Lunt
- Ariana DiLorenzo as Alexandra Lupertazzi
- Jane Kim as Dominique
- Allison Dunbar as Nicole Lupertazzi
- Kobi and Kadin George as Hector Selgado
- Guy A. Fortt as Guard
- Susan Porro as J.T. Dolan's Girlfriend
- Maria Iadonisi as Larry Barese's Wife
- Sam Semenza as Carmine Lupertazzi III
- Anna Mancini as Donna Parisi
- Lenny Ligotti as Nicky
- George Pogatsia as Frankie

== Synopsis ==
Johnny Sack is transferred to a prison hospital after being diagnosed with small-cell lung cancer. He dies with his wife and two daughters at his bedside. In New York, Phil forgoes leadership of the Lupertazzi family in favor of his protégé, Gerry Torciano. However, at dinner in a restaurant with Silvio, Gerry is killed on the orders of Faustino "Doc" Santoro. Tony, furious that Sil was put in danger, urges Little Carmine to vie again for control of the Lupertazzis. Carmine declines; his wife has said, "I don't want to be the wealthiest widow on Long Island."

On what would have been Billy's 47th birthday, Phil bitterly speaks to Butch about his "weakness", in particular after Billy was killed; he says there will be no more compromise.

Meadow has broken up with Finn, while Blanca is getting fed up with A.J. Tony is approached by FBI agents Harris and Goddard, who ask him to pass on anything he notices at the Newark docks that might concern terrorism. Tony turns his back on them.

Christopher finishes his Mafia-themed slasher film, Cleaver. Following the film's premiere in New York City, Tony congratulates Christopher and mingles with the Lupertazzis and the cast at the after-party. Tony does not see it at first, but Carmela notes a similarity between the film's love triangle and Christopher's suspicions that Tony had an affair with Adriana. Carmela sees the violent murder of the antagonist as Christopher's "revenge fantasy" against Tony. She confronts Christopher; she is doubtful about his depiction of Tony (and also about Adriana's whereabouts). He denies any similarities but is worried about what Tony might think.

Christopher asks his screenwriter, J.T. Dolan, to tell Tony that the character was his idea. When J.T. refuses, Christopher hits him over the head with a Humanitas Prize trophy. J.T. then visits the Bada Bing and tells Tony that he stole the characters and plot from the film Born Yesterday. Noticing a bruise on J.T.'s head, Tony seems to doubt his account, but watches Born Yesterday at home. Later, he painfully admits to Dr. Melfi that he believes Christopher despises him, and that Cleaver illustrates his hatred. He recalls being a father figure to Christopher. Melfi asks Tony to cautiously evaluate if he is not "reading into things," but he replies that his sessions with her have taught him enough about the human subconscious.

At the baptism of Christopher's daughter, Tony and Chris embrace closely, but their eyes belie the closeness.

== Deceased ==
- Gerardo "Gerry" Torciano: Shot multiple times to death while having dinner with Silvio Dante by a hitman on orders from Faustino "Doc" Santoro, to remove him from contention to the Lupertazzi family boss' position.
- John "Johnny Sack" Sacrimoni: Dies of lung cancer in prison.

== Final appearance ==
- "Stage 5" marks the final appearance of the character Lawrence "Larry Boy" Barese, a DiMeo/Soprano family capo. Larry is only mentioned in future episodes.

== Title reference ==
- After being told that his cancer has advanced to stage IV, Johnny Sack correctly guesses there is no stage V.
- The title could also refer to the fifth stage of grief (acceptance), as Johnny Sack accepts his fate after the doctor gives him his diagnosis and prognosis.
- Another potential meaning is distribution, as in the five stages of film development. Cleaver has wrapped production and is being distributed in the episode.

== Production ==
- Series writer and executive producer Matthew Weiner appears for the second time in the series as Mafia expert/author Manny Safier, this time on Geraldo Rivera's show.
- HBO released a mockumentary "Behind the Scenes" look at Cleaver titled Making Cleaver the week before the episode was released. It featured in-character interviews with Christopher, Little Carmine, director Morgan Yam, and actors Daniel Baldwin and Jonathan La Paglia, and the head make-up specialist. The mockumentary is included in The Sopranos Season 6 Part 2 DVD set and the Complete Series DVD collection.

== Music ==
- An instrumental version of the song "Thank You" by Dido is playing in the diner when Chris is talking to Eddie Dunne.
- Paulie's ringtone, heard during the showing of Christopher's film, is the Simon and Garfunkel song "Cecilia".
- The song-poem played at the end of the episode and over the credits is "Evidently Chickentown" by English punk poet John Cooper Clarke, from the album Snap, Crackle & Bop.

== Reception ==
"Stage 5" was the highest Nielsen rated program on cable TV for the week of April 9 to 15, 2007, with 7.42 million viewers.

Television Without Pity graded "Stage 5" with an A. Reviewer Kim Reed criticized the afterparty scene with Larry Boy: "...Larry Boy Barese and his date are regaling the others with tales of what it's like to be on a movie set, including the fact that the actors don't just make up their own lines!...Come on. No one is so dumb that they don't understand that movies have scripts." Reed also observed that the saga of Johnny Sack's cancer turned Tony and his crew into "old people...trying to one up each other with their ailments." Reed praised the scene of Ginny bleaching Johnny's shoes as an allusion to Johnny's character, specifically an image consciousness.

The Los Angeles Times had positive reviews of the episode. For its Show Tracker blog, Paul Brownfield praised two scenes featuring Paulie and regarded J.T. "a constant whipping boy for TV writer haughtiness." Jay A. Hernandez, in the weekly "Scriptland" feature, called the episode "both hysterical and insightful", with "brilliantly mordant humor". For Entertainment Weekly, Lisa Schwarzbaum observed: "...Tony and Phil have become the older generation, kvetching about their health, while the younger Carmine Jr. would rather not dirty his hands." However, Schwarzbaum criticized the subplot about Christopher's movie as "too easy and self-conscious".

IGN rated the episode 8.9 points out of 10, with critic Brian Zoromski commenting: "New developments were presented subtly and quietly, without getting too heavy-handed or expository."

Alan Sepinwall of The Star-Ledger praised the episode as "dark" and "wickedly funny", while regarding the death of Johnny Sack to be a loss of one of the show's best characters.
