= 5 stages =

5 stages may refer to:

- 5 stages of second language acquisition
- Five stages of grief

== See also ==
- Stage 5 (disambiguation)
