= Blue in Heaven =

Blue in Heaven were an Irish rock quartet from Churchtown, Dublin, active from 1982 to 1989 and led by singer Shane O'Neill. They reformed in 1990 as The Blue Angels. O'Neill later went on to form Supernaut with Dave Long from Into Paradise.

In 1983, Blue in Heaven released a single ("On & On") on U2's Mother Records. In 1984, they were signed by Island Records, who released 2 singles ("Julie Cries" & "Across My Heart"). In August 1985, Island Records released their first album, All The Gods' Men, which was produced by Martin Hannett.

Their follow-up, Explicit Material (1986), saw them team up with Island Records chief Chris Blackwell and Eric Thorngren. Their popularity grew thanks to touring with New Order (band), U2, The Chameleons, Echo & the Bunnymen, China Crisis, Spear of Destiny (band), The Damned, & Big Country. In 1986, they scored a college radio & MTV video hit: "I Just Wanna".

Kieran Kennedy joined and they played concerts for two years. They released an EP on the Solid label, Rock 'n' Roll R.I.P., which was a chronological compilation of their work: a 1983 track ("On and On") produced by The Edge, four from 1987 and a live cover of The Stooges's song "Loose." Kennedy left to start the Black Velvet Band.

At a concert in Dublin's Baggot Inn in August 1989, they supported David Bowie's band Tin Machine.

== Members ==
=== Original recording members ===
- Drums - Dave Clarke (later played drums for The Black Velvet Band, Warren Zevon, and currently, for Hothouse Flowers)
- Bass - Declan Jones
- Guitar, keyboards, vocals - Shane O'Neill
- Guitar, keyboards - Eamonn Tynan

==== Supernaut ====
In 1997, O'Neill played mostly rhythm electric and acoustic guitar and bass, and sang and wrote words and music with Dave Long, from Into Paradise. Clarke played drums and percussion. Paul McQuillan, who later played and wrote with Hope Sandoval and The Warm Inventions, played electric guitar and ray gun and released a self-titled album on Dirt Records. Today, O'Neill runs a recording studio in Dublin.

=== Additional musicians ===
==== Blue Angels ====
- Guitar - Quentin Cowper; he moved to County Clare where he now plays largely traditional Irish music on fiddle and banjo with 'The Fiddle Case' and Ceili Bandits.

== Discography ==
=== Blue in Heaven ===
==== Albums ====
- All the Gods' Men (1985)
- Explicit Material (1986)

==== EPs ====
- Rock 'n' Roll R.I.P. (1988)

==== Compilation albums ====
- Live for Ireland (1986) -- "Tell Me" (recorded live during their performance for Self Aid)

==== Singles ====
- "The Lights Go Out" (1983)
- "Julie Cries" (1984)
- "Across My Heart" (1984)
- "I Just Wanna" (1986)
- "Track 01" (1988)

=== Blue Angels ===
==== Albums ====
- Coming Out Of Nowhere (1993)

==== EPs ====
- Get It Back (1991)
- All The Way (1992)
- When It's Gone (1993)

"Blow"

==== Compilation albums ====
- HMV Unplugged: The Acoustic Sessions (1993) - "Candy"

==== Singles ====
- "Candy" (1991)
- "Loose" (1992)
- "Blow" (1994)
