= Strumpet (film) =

2001 film directed by Danny Boyle

- DVD cover art
- Directed by: Danny Boyle
- Written by: Jim Cartwright
- Produced by: Martin Carr
- Starring: Christopher Eccleston; Jenna G
- Cinematography: Anthony Dod Mantle
- Edited by: Chris Gill
- Music by: John Murphy
- Production companies: BBC; Destiny Films
- Distributed by: BBC
- Release dates: 23 August 2001 (EIFF); 7 October 2001 (United Kingdom)
- Running time: 72 minutes
- Country: United Kingdom
- Language: English

Strumpet is a 2001 British music-drama film produced by the BBC in association with Destiny Films. It was directed by Danny Boyle, written by Jim Cartwright, and stars Christopher Eccleston, Jenna G and Stephen Walters. The film score was composed by John Murphy.

The film premiered at the Edinburgh International Film Festival on 23 August 2001 on a double-bill with its companion project Vacuuming Completely Nude in Paradise. The double-bill was screened again at the Toronto International Film Festival on 14 September 2001. Strumpet was broadcast on BBC Two on 7 October 2001.

== Plot ==
The film features a poet named Strayman (played by Christopher Eccleston) who lives with a pack of stray dogs in a rough estate in a town of Northern England. He meets a young woman he calls Strumpet (played by singer Jenna G.), whom he rescues from a predatory man. Out of kindness, he takes her into his flat. He asks her to play guitar and he sings along from his poetry. Strayman's neighbour, Knockoff (played by Stephen Walters), overhears them and wants to represent their talent. The pair land a record contract, face problems with the recording process and eventually are featured on the BBC's Top of the Pops.

== Production ==
While working at the Royal Court Theater in the 1980s, Director Danny Boyle was introduced to the work of Jim Cartwright. He left the theater before the opportunity to direct one of his plays came available, but maintained a desire to work with the playwright. That chance came in 2001 when Boyle returned to the small-screen to direct several small-scale dramas. While working together on Vacuuming Completely Nude in Paradise, Boyle mentioned a desire to make a film about the Manchester music scene. Cartwright had such a screenplay, titled Strumpet, which had been commissioned and subsequently dropped by the BBC. Still lacking funding, Boyle chose to film in digital video, which meant he was able to film both movies for the original budget of Vacuuming Completely Nude in Paradise.

The script, about the creative instinct, became the vehicle Boyle used to illustrate how music and street poetry are spontaneous and unplanned creations. Boyle spoke of the film by saying, "Strumpet is a tribute to all the great musicians and writers who have come out of Manchester. God knows where they come from, or how they keep going, but they're always there."

Strumpet was shot completely on digital video on location in Manchester and London by director of photography Anthony Dod Mantle, who had worked with the medium on previous films. Cameras were placed in locations throughout the set so that every shot could be covered in multiple angles. Boyle, who is an advocate of digital video, would go on to use it in his next feature film, 28 Days Later.

== Music ==
The film features Eccleston's recitation of "Evidently Chickentown" by John Cooper Clarke, as well as versions of the song Strayman and Strumpet perform together.
