= Cleaver (The Sopranos) =

- Directed by: Morgan Yam
- Screenplay by: J. T. Dolan
- Story by: Christopher Moltisanti
- Produced by: Carmine Lupertazzi Jr.; Christopher Moltisanti
- Starring: Jonathan LaPaglia; Daniel Baldwin
- Production company: Lone Wolves Productions
- Release date: September 9, 2007
- Country: United States
- Language: English

Cleaver is a metafictional film within a TV series that serves as a plot element toward the end of the HBO television drama series The Sopranos. Although very little film material is actually shown in the series, its planning and development are discussed at large throughout multiple seasons of the show. The extent to which character Christopher Moltisanti mixes confidential and personal information about the Soprano mob family into the story elements of Cleaver is the focal point throughout its development.

Cleaver— ‌originally titled Pork Store Killer— ‌can be categorized as a direct-to-DVD mafia-slasher film, described alternately as "Saw meets The Godfather II", "The Ring meets The Godfather", and "a story of a young man who goes to pieces, then manages to find himself again". Several characters are credited for their involvement in the project. The screenplay was written by J. T. Dolan and based on a story by Christopher Moltisanti. The film was directed by Morgan Yam, and produced by Carmine Lupertazzi, Jr. and Moltisanti.

The film starred Jonathan LaPaglia as Michael "the Cleaver" and Daniel Baldwin as mob boss Salvatore ("Sally Boy"). Sally Boy's key advisors are played by George Pogatsia (Frankie) and Lenny Ligotti (Nicky). Initially, Moltisanti and Lupertazzi attempted to cast Ben Kingsley as the mafia boss in the episode "Luxury Lounge", but Kingsley turned the part down.

== Plot ==
The protagonist of Cleaver is Michael, a character nicknamed "the Butcher". When Christopher Moltisanti proposes the plot to writer J. T. Dolan, he says the film is about a "young wise guy, assassin, gets betrayed by his people. They whack him and leave his body parts in dumpsters all around the city. Long story short, he is put back together, by science...or maybe it's supernatural. And he gets payback on everyone who fucked him over, including the cunt who he was engaged to. She was getting porked by his boss the night the hero was killed."

Several episodes in the film are drawn from Moltisanti's own life experiences as a made man in the Soprano crime family, including a misinterpreted and overblown rumor concerning an alleged affair between Family head Anthony Soprano and Christopher's then-fiancée Adriana La Cerva. The film closes on a tight shot of a crucifix and a cornicello, juxtaposing "the sacred and the propane".

== Development ==
Christopher Moltisanti met J. T. Dolan while both were in rehab recovering from heroin addiction. In the episode "In Camelot" (5×07), their friendship gets complicated when Christopher introduced J. T. to the underground world of high-stakes poker games, inadvertently giving the writer a new outlet for his addictive personality. Dolan rapidly found himself $60,000 in debt, and soon wound up back in rehab at Moltisanti's prompting.

The film itself originated in "Mayham" (6×03) when Moltisanti offered Dolan a way to clear his debts: to write a screenplay for a digital slasher film based on a concept by Christopher, but the story had its genesis earlier, when Christopher began his quest to write a screenplay in "The Legend of Tennessee Moltisanti" (1 ×08). After struggling through 19 pages, Moltisanti became disillusioned and slipped into a depression, throwing away his work.

He later had an affair with studio vice-president Amy Safir in "D-Girl" (2×07). Through her, he met Swingers and Made writer Jon Favreau, with whom he discussed his film concept. When they decide that the title of the movie is to be Cleaver, Christopher mentions to Tony that the estate of Black Panther Party leader Eldridge Cleaver has filed a motion to put a hold on production because of the name association. This is never brought up again in the series and the title does not change.

In "Kaisha" (6× 12), Moltisanti discussed the similarities between Sally Boy and Anthony Soprano with Julianna Skiff, describing both as men who think that everything belongs to them—‌a notion crystallized by Sally Boy in Cleaver's finale when he tells Michael: "What you have belongs to me" because "what's mine is mine; what's yours is mine".

=== Episodes ===
- "The Legend of Tennessee Moltisanti" (1 ×08)
- "D-Girl" (2×07)
- "In Camelot" (5×07)
- "Mayham" (6×03)
- "Luxury Lounge" (6×07)
- "Kaisha" (6× 12)
- "Stage 5" (6× 14)

== Mockumentary ==
In conjunction with the premiere of "Stage 5", HBO aired the seven-minute mockumentary Making Cleaver, detailing the film's production. Including in-character interviews with Moltisanti, Lupertazzi, Yam, Baldwin, LaPaglia, and special-effects make-up artist Steve Kelly, the behind-the-scenes look is broken up into four segments: "Concept", "Courting Kingsley", "Cast and Crew", and "A 'Family' Production". The mockumentary is included in the Season 6 Part 2 DVD set and in The Complete Series DVD collection.
