= Evidently Chickentown =

Poem by John Cooper Clarke

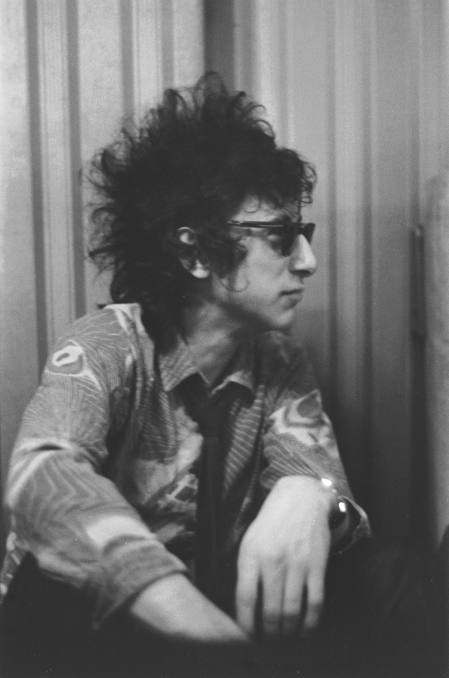
Clarke in 1979

"Evidently Chickentown" is a poem by the English performance poet John Cooper Clarke. It was recorded and released as a track on Clarke's 1980 album Snap, Crackle & Bop. It became widely known internationally after being used in an episode of the HBO series The Sopranos in April 2007, and has appeared in several other films and TV series.

== Background and description ==
The poem uses repeated profanity to convey a sense of futility and exasperation. Featured on Clarke's 1980 album Snap, Crackle & Bop, the realism of its lyrics is married with haunting, edgy arrangements.

The poem bears a resemblance to a 1952 work titled "The Bloody Orkneys", written by Andrew James Fraser Blair, author and journalist, under the pseudonym Captain Hamish Blair. In 2009 Clarke said he "didn't consciously copy it. But I must have heard that poem, years ago. It's terrific."

== In film and television ==
"Evidently Chickentown" appears on the soundtrack of a number of films, including:

- Danny Boyle's 2001 film Strumpet, in which Christopher Eccleston recites the poem
- Anton Corbijn's 2007 film about Joy Division singer Ian Curtis, Control, in which Clarke appears as himself reciting the poem
- Jacques Audiard's 2012 film Rust and Bone

It also turns up on television, including:

- at the end of "Stage 5", a 2007 episode of the American television drama The Sopranos, leading Sean O'Neal of The A.V. Club to write that the poem "ranks as one of the show's sharpest and most effective musical moments, somehow capturing the vexation of a New York mafia guy with the words of a British punk who's complaining about flat beer and cold chips"
- in the 2021 two-part documentary HBO miniseries about Tiger Woods, Tiger
- in Danny Boyle's 2022 biopic miniseries Pistol
