= Robert Blamire =

- Born: c. 1959
- Origin: County Durham, England
- Genres: Punk rock, new wave, synthpop
- Occupation(s): Musician, record producer, manager
- Instrument: Bass guitar
- Years active: 1976 – present

Robert Blamire (born c. 1959) is known primarily as bassist for the punk and new wave band Penetration.

He founded the band along with singer Pauline Murray in 1976 after seeing a performance by The Sex Pistols. After the band split up, he and Murray went on to form The Invisible Girls with members of John Cooper Clarke's backing band.

He also worked with Patrik Fitzgerald, and produced the Scottish post-punk band the Scars' only album, Author! Author!.

As of 2006, he was lecturing on Graphic Design.
