= John Cooper Clarke =

English poet (born 1949)

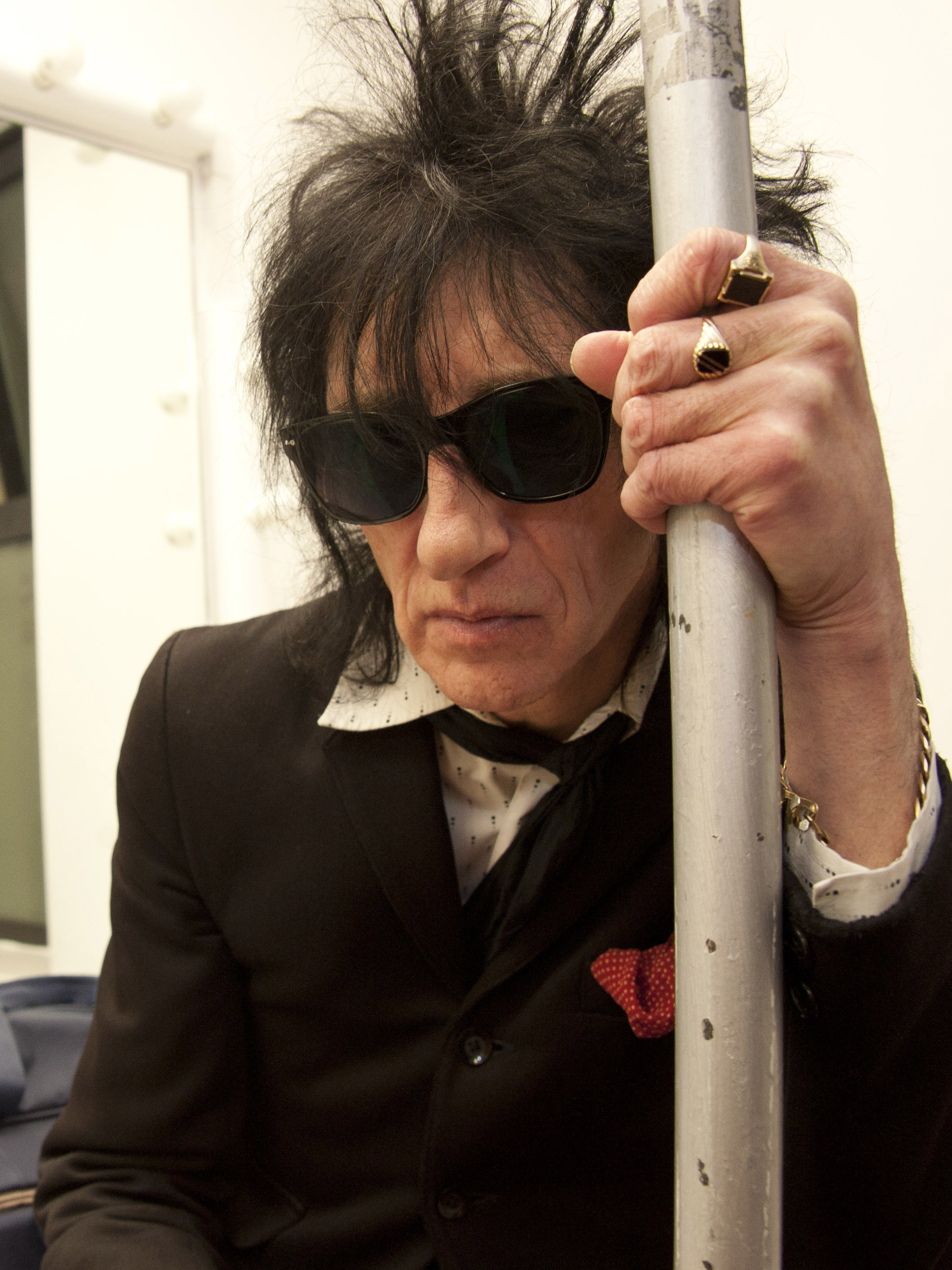
- Clarke in 2010
- Born: 25 January 1949 (age 77); Salford, Lancashire, England
- Other name: The Bard of Salford
- Occupation: Poet
- Spouse(s): Chris (m. 1970; sep. 1973) Evie Clarke (m. 1990)
- Children: 1
- Writing career
- Language: English
- Period: 1977–present
- Genres: Punk poetry, performance poetry
- John Cooper Clarke's voice Clarke discussing the poem "Woodman, Spare That Tree!"
- Website: johncooperclarke.com

John Cooper Clarke (born 25 January 1949), also known as JCC and "The Bard of Salford", is an English performance poet and comedian who was often referred to as a "punk poet" in the late 1970s. In the late 1970s and early 1980s, he released several albums and performed on stage with punk and post-punk bands and has continued to write and perform since. The title of his first poetry anthology, Ten Years in an Open Necked Shirt, published in 1982, was also used for a documentary film about him in the same year.

Clarke has been an influence on many later artists, including Arctic Monkeys. In 2013, he was presented with an honorary doctorate by the University of Salford. As of 2025, he has released three anthologies of poetry and a memoir, as well as many albums and singles, and continues to perform regularly.

== Early life and education ==
John Cooper Clarke was born in Salford, Lancashire, on 25 January 1949. "Cooper" is his middle name, and Clarke his surname. Clarke suffered a bout of tuberculosis as a child. He disliked being outdoors, and read a lot. He lived in the Higher Broughton area of Salford, and attended the local secondary modern Catholic school. He became interested in poetry after being inspired by his English teacher, John Malone, and later reported that he wrote his first poem in his final year at school, about a priest who farted during a service.

He left school at 15, obtaining brief stints of employment as an apprentice motor mechanic, window cleaner, and fire-watcher at the docks. For six years, he did an apprenticeship as a compositor, earning a City and Guilds certificate. He spent two years as a laboratory technician at Salford Tech. ("It sounds very technical, but all I did was hand out chisels.") Shortly after leaving school, Clarke played bass in a band first called The Mafia, renamed The Vendettas after the first gig, and in 1967 played in a psychedelic music band called The Lovely Flowers. He got into mod culture when he was a motor mechanic, and became a fan of soul music, Motown, and Stax. He was writing poetry all through the years of working at his early jobs.

=== Early influences ===
One of Clarke's early inspirations was the poet Sir Henry Newbolt. During an April 2018 episode of Steve Jones's radio show Jonesy's Jukebox, he revealed Newbolt as one of his early inspirations, reciting from memory a portion of "Vitaï Lampada". He also read Edgar Allan Poe, which took him to the French poet Charles Baudelaire. Later influences included The Mersey Sound poets (Adrian Henri, Brian Patten, and Roger McGough).

His delivery was inspired by Futurist poetry as well as the horseracing commentary of Peter O'Sullevan.

== Career ==
After unsuccessfully trying to find a publisher for his poetry Clarke began performing in working men's clubs while he was still working at Salford Tech. He gave up his lab technician job when he achieved some success in the late 1970s, and Howard Devoto (of the Buzzcocks) encouraged him to perform in punk clubs. His first releases were on Tosh Ryan and Martin Hannett's independent label Rabid, starting with the EP Innocents in October 1977. The EP was described by NME as a series of poems "alternatively funny, sordid, and pessimistic pictures" of life in the UK since the end of World War II in 1945. The magazine criticises the density of the imagery, particularly on the "magnum opus", the "Psycle Sluts", but praises "Gimmix! (Play Loud)", which just made it into the top 40 singles chart, at no.39. Tony Wilson, founder of Factory Records, was an early champion of Clarke, interviewing him on his TV show So It Goes.

His early recorded output had musical backing from the Invisible Girls, which featured Martin Hannett and Steve Hopkins, along with a rotating schedule of other musicians, including Pete Shelley (of Buzzcocks fame), Bill Nelson, and Paul Burgess. He later said "It was never my idea to put my poetry to music but I couldn't think of an argument against it", and thought that the results were "patchy".

Clarke has attributed his early success in part to the influence of the English poet Pam Ayres. Her run of success on the British TV show Opportunity Knocks led both Clarke and his mother to believe that he could make a living at poetry. He cited his influences in this period as Bob Dylan; Captain Beefheart; some Frank Zappa; The Velvet Underground; reggae music, including The Wailers and I Roy; Ian Dury; The Sex Pistols, the Buzzcocks; Slaughter and the Dogs; and other punk and new wave music, which he said had "revived an interest in words". He also said that his appreciation of punk had originated with New York punk bands, especially The Ramones and Velvet Underground; the first British punk band he'd seen was The Stranglers, when they supported Patti Smith on tour in 1974. He has also said that The Great American Songbook was a strong influence on him, and that he had been a great fan of much American music, including American reggae and ska musicians.

Clarke's debut LP Où est la maison de fromage?, a collection of live recordings, demos, and rehearsals, was also released by Rabid (catalogue number NOZE 1) in 1978. He toured with Bill Nelson's band Be-Bop Deluxe in 1978 and was signed by Epic Records, who issued the studio album Disguise in Love, produced by Hannett, in 1978. In 1978 he had a backing band called The Curious Yellows, whose music was a bit like the German electronic band Kraftwerk. and, in 1979, had his only UK top 40 hit with "Gimmix! (Play Loud)".

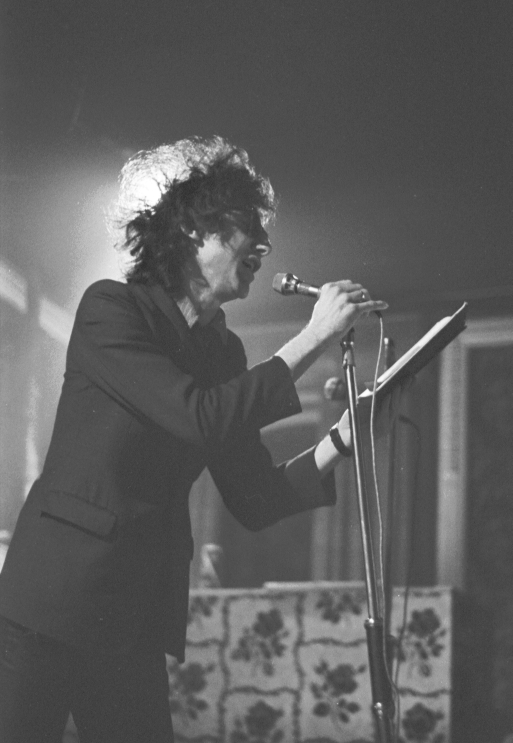
Performing in Cardiff, 1979

He toured with Linton Kwesi Johnson, and performed on the same bill as bands such as the Sex Pistols, the Fall, Joy Division, Buzzcocks, Siouxsie and the Banshees, Elvis Costello, Rockpile, and New Order (including at their May 1984 Music for Miners benefit concert at London's Royal Festival Hall). His set was and still is characterised by lively rapid-fire renditions of his poems, usually performed a cappella. He also played twice at CBGB, in New York City, once with David Johansen (after the New York Dolls). During this time, and since, he was often referred to as a "punk poet", although in the early days of punk, he was not always accepted by fans of punk music; in 1977, opening for the Buzzcocks at the Vortex Club in London, he was met with abuse from the audience.

In 1980, he released Snap, Crackle & Bop, which made number 26 in the charts.

Thereafter performed his live act less frequently, spending much of the 1980s mired in heroin addiction during which time, he also shared an apartment with singer and fellow addict Nico for a few months. He described this period of his life: "It was a feral existence. I was on drugs. It was hand to mouth", and also that he had nearly died four times. He eventually got clean after meeting his second wife, Evie.

Clarke released Zip Style Method in 1982.

In 1987, he performed live (on crutches owing to a broken ankle) at the Albany Empire in London with Suns of Arqa, recorded two tracks ("Libera Me" and "The Truth Lies Therein") for their album Seven, and featured in the music video for the latter.

Clarke returned to live performance in the 1990s, appearing again with Suns of Arqa in 1992 at The Witchwood in Ashton-under-Lyne. His vocals from both of his Suns of Arqa tracks have been used on numerous remixes by the band ever since.

=== Since 2000 ===
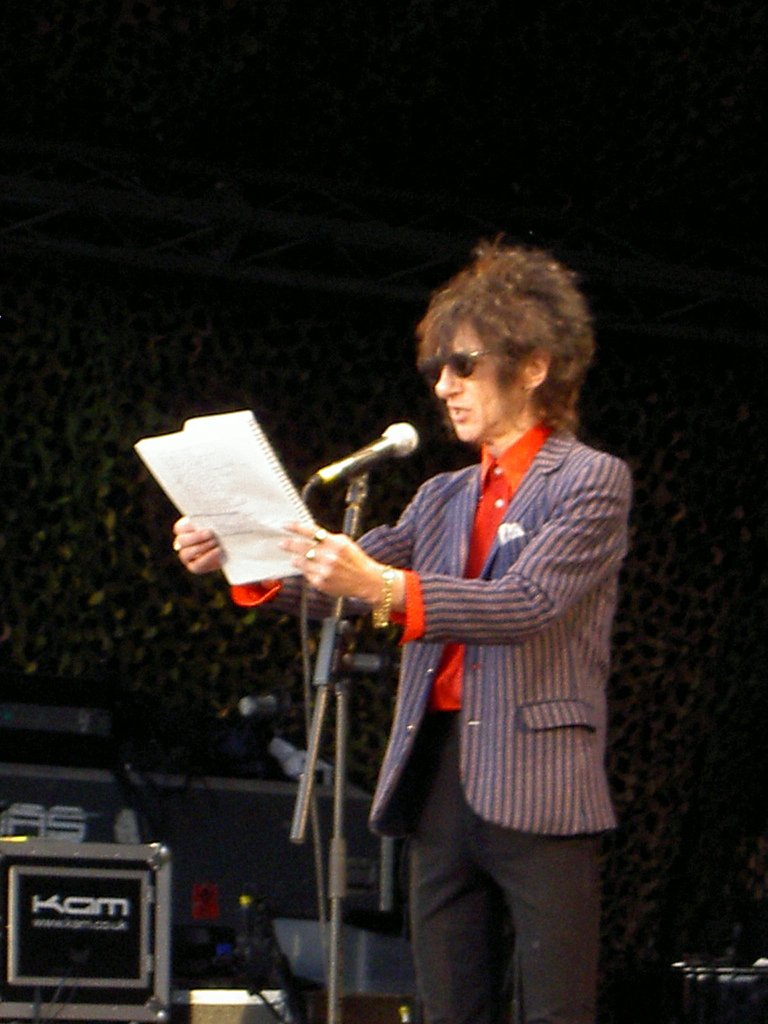
At Bedford's Rhythm Festival, 2006

After 20 years of performing the same material, Clarke re-established contact with guitarist Rick Goldstraw, who had founded Blue Orchids and played with The Fall and Nico. Goldshaw began handling Clarke's affairs, and the two toured with the Mescaleros and several times supporting the Fall.

He also duetted with Reverend Jon McClure at a Reverend and the Makers concert performing the poem "Last Resort", which was later released as the B-side for the band's 2007 single "Heavyweight Champion of the World". Clarke also recorded a song with the band entitled "Dead Man's Shoes", which was planned to be released as a single.

By 2008, he had been getting significant public exposure again, having featured in films and getting mentions by young stars such as Lily Allen and Kate Nash. He appeared with (ex-Clash) Mick Jones' Carbon/Silicon, including at the Inn on the Green in Ladbroke Grove in February 2008.

Clarke toured the UK in 2014, giving performances which were well-reviewed by critics. On 21 March 2015, Clarke performed at the O2 Apollo Manchester.

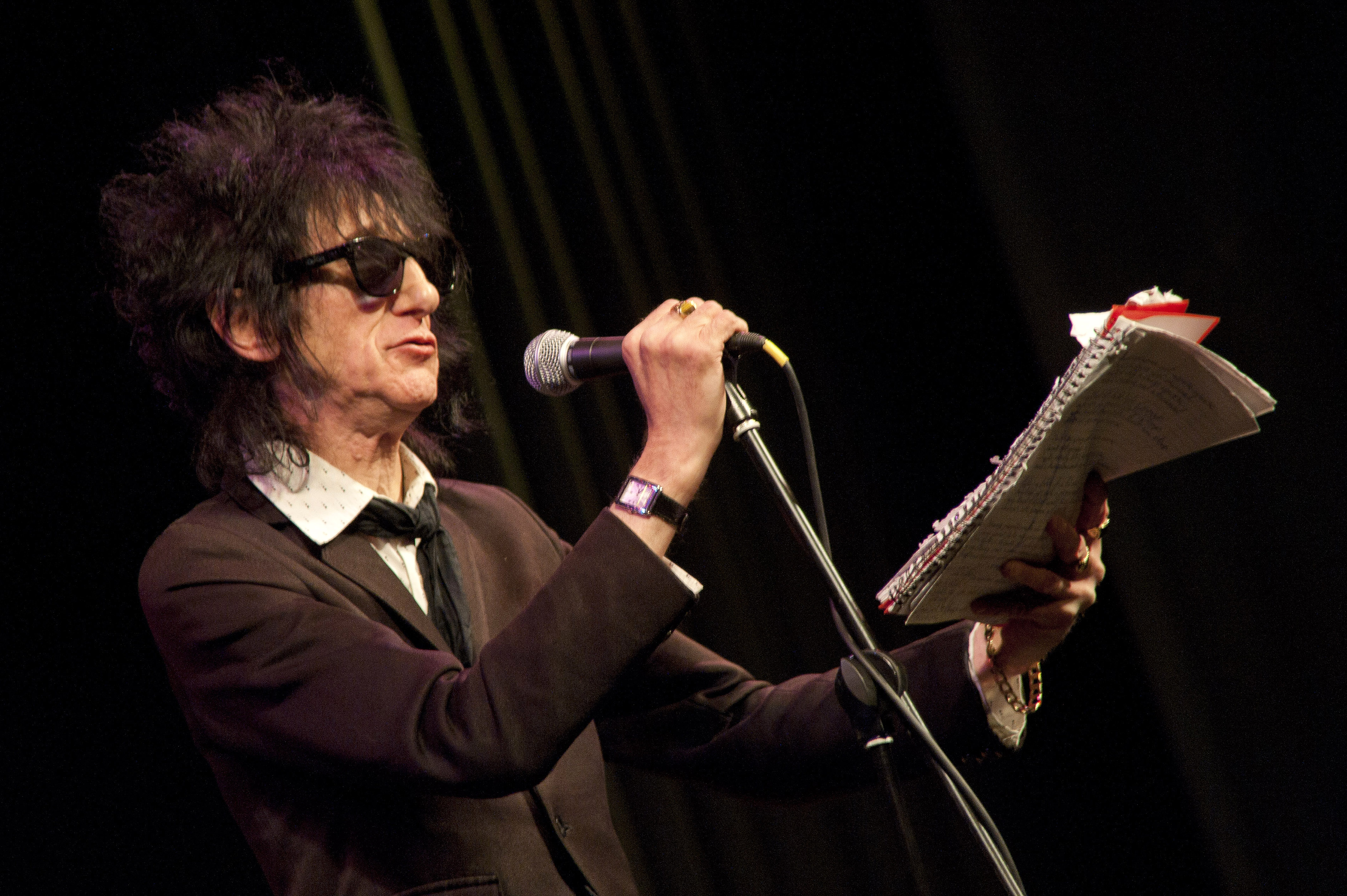
Clarke performing in Bridlington, 2010

In 2016, Clarke collaborated with (ex-Stranglers) Hugh Cornwell on This Time It's Personal, comprising cover versions of songs important to both of them in their youth, including "MacArthur Park". It is the first (and only) time that Clarke has been recorded singing songs. The album was released by Sony on 14 October 2016. He also sings the Conway Twitty song "It's Only Make Believe"; Jerry Leiber and Phil Spector's "Spanish Harlem"; Ricky Nelson's "Sweeter Than You"; and Ritchie Valens' "Donna" on the album, among others.

In March 2019, Clarke toured the US to promote his new poetry anthology, The Luckiest Guy Alive. He performed at Joe's Pub in New York.

On 2024, Clarke performed sets in London, Nottingham, and Manchester as part of World Poetry Day (21 March) celebrations.

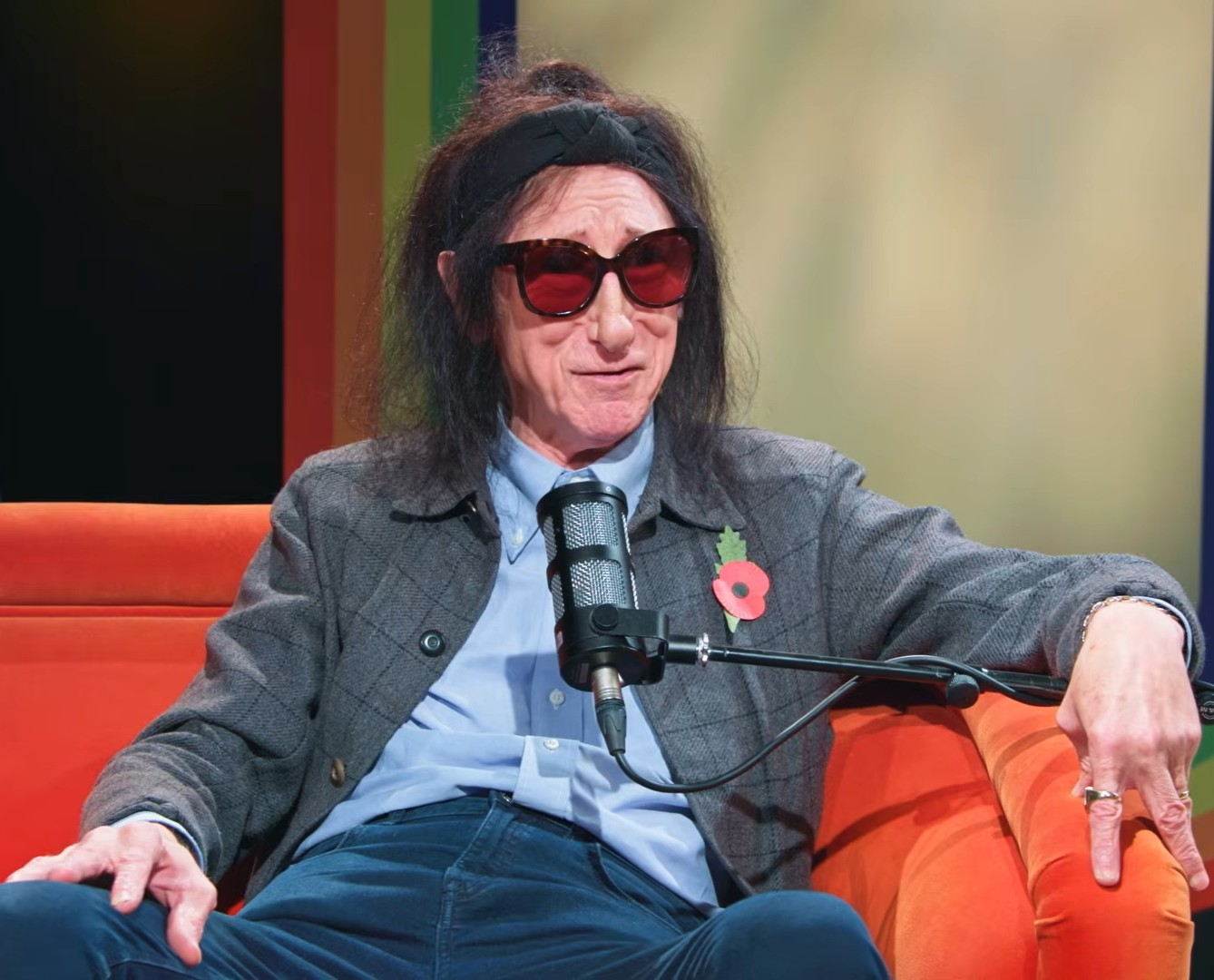
Clarke on The Harry Hill Show podcast, 2026

In March 2025, Clarke went on a tour titled Dr John Cooper Clarke: In Celebration of World Poetry Day, including dates at the London Palladium, Nottingham Royal Concert Hall, and Co-op Live in Manchester. He performed old favourites as well as poems from his new collection WHAT. Special guests on the tour included Guyanese playwright John Agard.

In October 2025, Luvcat, who was named Breakthrough Artist of the Year at the 2025 Northern Music Awards, shared an anniversary edition of her single "He's My Man" which features Clarke. In the video, Clarke appears as the singer's poisoned husband.

On 24 October 2025, he performed at the City Hall in Salisbury, and on 18 November 2025, at the Assembly Hall Theatre in Tunbridge Wells in a performance dubbed "Dr John Cooper Clarke & Special Guests".

=== Nicknames ===
Clarke is often referred to as "the Bard of Salford", or simply JCC. He is also frequently described as a (or the) punk poet.

== Influence on other artists ==
=== Arctic Monkeys ===
Clarke's most high-profile fan has been Alex Turner. Clarke's poem "Out of Control Fairground" was printed inside the Arctic Monkeys' 2007 single "Fluorescent Adolescent" CD. The poem is also the inspiration behind the single's video, in which clowns brawl. Turner has said he is very fond of Clarke's work and takes inspiration for lyrics from his poems.

His "I Wanna Be Yours" poem was adapted by the Arctic Monkeys and frontman Turner for the band's fifth album, AM, released on 9 September 2013. The track was not released as a single, but went on to be streamed over four billion times, and is listed as one of Spotify's all-time Top 20. It is a rare love poem in Clarke's canon of works, and he said that he prefers Turner's version to his own, which had "kitsch musical backing". The song is often featured as a wedding reading.

=== Others ===
Clarke once said: "The only person I've ever been compared to is Alexander Pope... I can live with that. But millions of people have been compared to me". Plan B (Ben Drew), Kate Nash, and Lily Allen have also cited Clarke as influencing their work. He has also influenced a newer generation of other performers, including comedians and performance poets, such as Luke Wright, Stewart Lee, Eddie Argos, and Rob Auton. Irish musician Grian Chatten, frontman of Fontaines D.C., was inspired by Clarke's work. On their 2020 eponymous debut album, English band Working Men's Club pays homage to the poet in the track "John Cooper Clarke", referencing his poem "Attack of the Fifty Foot Woman" and book The Luckiest Guy Alive.

== Publications ==
In 1983, Clarke published his first anthology of poetry, titled Ten Years in an Open Necked Shirt. The title refers to the fact that he had performed for so long without publishing any of his poetry. The book stayed in print and became the best selling poetry volume of the decade, and was reissued by Penguin Books in 2013.

His second anthology, The Luckiest Guy Alive was published in 2018 . The title of his 2020 memoir, I Wanna Be Yours, was taken from his poem of the same name. He said that he had tried to make it entertaining, and left "a lot of stuff" out. It was also released as an audiobook.

In 2024, What was published in print and as an audiobook read by the poet with a new collection of poems. Fiona Sturges of The Guardian described the new poems as "vintage Clarke: full of wordplay and whimsical humour and threaded with sharp social commentary". The book was also reviewed in The Times by Graeme Richardson.

== Television, film, and radio ==
=== Personal appearances ===
In 1977, Clarke was interviewed by Tony Wilson on his TV show So It Goes. He appeared on the BBC2 youth music television series, Something Else, which aired between 1979 and 1982.

In 1981, Clarke appeared as a reflection in a mirror, in The Innes Book of Records, reciting a sanitised version of "Evidently Chickentown".

In 1988, he made an appearance in two UK adverts for Sugar Puffs, taking second billing to the Honey Monster.

A live performance of "Evidently Chickentown" appears in the 2007 film Control, with Clarke portraying himself in a re-creation of a 1977 concert in which he supported Joy Division, despite being 30 years older than the events depicted in the film.

In 2012, Clarke featured in rapper Plan B's feature film Ill Manors and subsequently the Ill Manors album.

In 2015, Clarke presented a documentary on Thomas De Quincey's Confessions of an English Opium-Eater in the BBC's second series of The Secret Life of Books. He has appeared as a guest on the comedy panel show Would I Lie to You? in 2015, and again in 2022.

In January 2018, Clarke appeared as a contestant on an academic version of BBC One's Pointless Celebrities partnered with historian Suzannah Lipscomb; they reached the head-to-head round. He has also appeared alongside Susie Dent in Dictionary Corner in several episodes of 8 Out of 10 Cats Does Countdown since 2017. In July 2019, Clarke was the guest for BBC Radio 4's Desert Island Discs. A fan of the show for 60 years, he described it as having "all the finality of a suicide note, without the actual obligation of topping yourself". His book choice was Against Nature by Joris-Karl Huysmans, his luxury item was a boulder of opium twice the size of his head and his favourite track was "How Great Thou Art" by Elvis Presley. In November 2019, Clarke was a participant, alongside Phill Jupitus, in BBC's Celebrity Antiques Road Trip. Four of Clarke's five lots made a loss, giving a total loss of £233.54.

On 20 December 2021, Clarke made a guest appearance in "We Wish You a Mandy Christmas", a Christmas episode of Mandy, playing the Ghost of Christmas Yet to Come.

==== Documentaries ====
Clarke was featured in a 1982 music documentary film compilation, Urgh! A Music War, in which he performed his poem "Health Fanatic". The film featured live performances of mainstream artists (the Police, the Go-Go's, XTC, Devo) as well as more obscure bands, using concert footage from around the world.

Clarke is the subject of the 1982 film Ten Years in an Open Necked Shirt, directed by Nick May and produced for the Arts Council of Great Britain and Channel 4 1982. Somewhere between a narrative film, a series of music videos and a documentary, the film features interviews and performances by Clarke and Linton Kwesi Johnson, Michèle Roberts, Jules Deelder, Attila the Stockbroker, and Seething Wells (Steven Wells). The title derives from the tale of an alter-ego Lenny Siberia ("the bastard offspring of Captain Africa (the lard mogul) and Tracy") created by Clarke, revealed in a performance near the end of the film. The film screened in film festivals around the world. The film is available for viewing on the BFI website.

He appeared in Julien Temple's 2007 documentary film about Joe Strummer, titled Joe Strummer: The Future Is Unwritten, and in the 2009 film All Tomorrow's Parties, covering the long-running All Tomorrow's Parties music festival.

In May 2012, Clarke was the subject of a BBC Four documentary, Evidently... John Cooper Clarke, which screened as part of the BBC's Punk Britannia season, and featured Steve Coogan, among others. The doco was directed by John Ross, produced by Scotty Clark. It features interviews from Bill Bailey, Pete Shelley, Paul Farley, Steve Coogan, Mark Radcliffe, Craig Charles, Plan B, Kate Nash, Alex Turner, Miranda Sawyer and Paul Morley; and poems by Clarke, including "Things Are Gonna Get Worse", "Evidently Chickentown", "Twat" and "Beasley Street". John Crace, writing for The Guardian, described the documentary as "a film that dealt in myths rather than reality" but assessed Clarke as "still clever, funny and relevant". Mark Monahan in The Daily Telegraph wrote that the programme "veered too close to comfort towards hagiography" but "was nevertheless perhaps a fair reflection of the affection with which [Clarke] has been widely regarded".

=== Use of tracks ===
Clarke's recording of "Evidently Chickentown" from his 1980 album Snap, Crackle & Bop was featured prominently in the closing scene of The Sopranos episode "Stage 5" in 2007.

The song "Evidently Chickentown" (recited by Christopher Eccleston) is featured in the 2001 made-for-television film Strumpet, by Danny Boyle. The track is also used in the 2021 two-part HBO documentary about Tiger Woods, Tiger.

== Recognition and honours ==
By the 1990s, three of his poems, including "I Wanna Be Yours" and "Twat", had been included in the GCSE English Literature syllabus, and he toured town halls performing to audiences of school students.

In July 2013, Clarke was presented with an honorary doctorate of arts by the University of Salford, where he had worked as lab technician in its former incarnation as Salford Technical College. It was awarded in "acknowledgement of a career which has spanned five decades, bringing poetry to non-traditional audiences and influencing musicians and comedians". Upon receipt, Clarke commented: "Now I'm a doctor, finally my dream of opening a cosmetic surgery business can become a reality."

Also in 2013, Q Magazine named Clarke as its first poet laureate.

In July 2015, he was asked to contribute the opening verses of a poem to celebrate the 50th anniversary of the National Trust's Project Neptune, a campaign to protect 775 miles (1,247 km) of coastline. Members of the public were asked to complete the poem. In 2016, Dave Simpson, writing in The Guardian, called Clarke "polymath, renaissance man and true enigma".

In July 2023, Clarke was honoured by Salford City Council with the city’s highest honour, being made an Honorary Freeman of the City of Salford.

In March 2025, he received the main award at the 2025 Northern Music Awards, "in recognition of his influence in the world of music and poetry". The awards, which celebrate talent from the north of England, are a fundraising initiative by Nordoff and Robbins, a music therapy charity. The ceremony was held in the Liverpool Olympia.

== Personal life ==
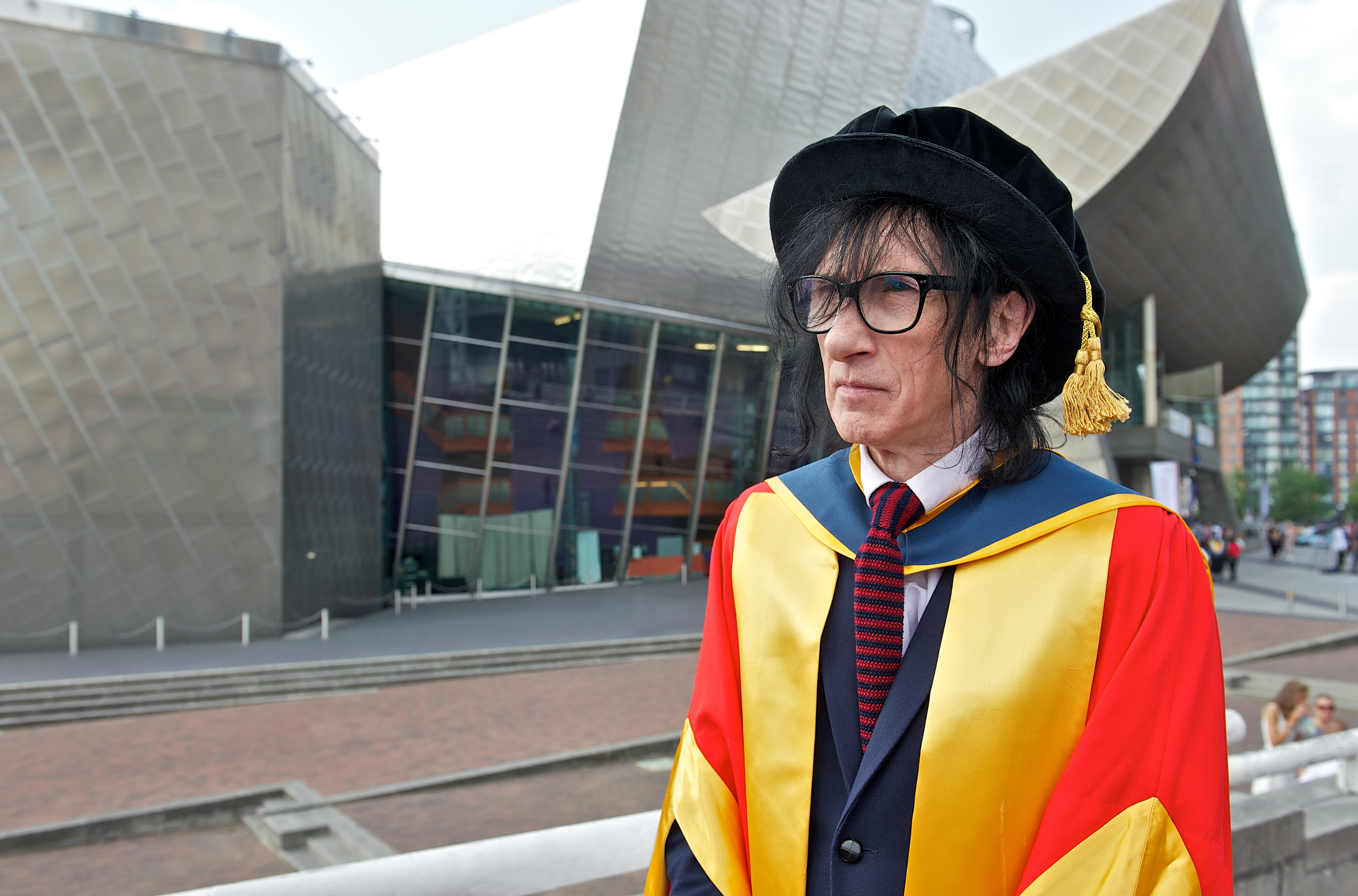
Clarke receives an honorary doctorate from the University of Salford, 2013

Clarke married his first wife, Chris, when he was 21 (around 1970), and they moved to Shaftesbury in Dorset. After three years, they separated, and Clarke moved back to Manchester.

During the 1980s, for a few months Clarke shared an apartment with the singer Nico (both were addicted to heroin at the time) in Brixton, London. As of 2025, Clarke is married to Evie, who was born in the Picardy region of France, and worked as a language teacher. They married in around 1990, having bonded over a shared love of the French poet Baudelaire when they met. They have one daughter, born when Cooper Clarke was 45. As of November 2025, they were living in Colchester, Essex, where they have lived for decades.

In October 2020, Clarke published an autobiography which took its title from his poem "I Wanna Be Yours".

== Discography ==
=== Albums and EPs ===
- Innocents EP (1977), Rabid
- Où est la maison de fromage? (1978), Rabid (re-released on orange vinyl on Record Store Day in 2016)
- Disguise in Love (1978), Epic – AUS No. 100
- Walking Back to Happiness (1979), Epic (Live album)
- Snap, Crackle & Bop (1980), Epic – UK No. 26, AUS No. 99
- Zip Style Method (1982), Epic - UK No. 97
- This Time It's Personal with Hugh Cornwell (2016), Sony - UK No. 34
- The Luckiest Guy Alive (2018), Macmillan Digital Audio

==== Compilations ====
- Me and My Big Mouth (1981), Epic
- Word of Mouth: The Very Best of John Cooper Clarke (2002), Sony
- Anthologia (2015; 3-CD + DVD), Sony

=== Singles ===
- "Post-War Glamour Girl" (1978), CBS
- "Gimmix! (Play Loud)" (1978), Epic – UK No. 39
- "Splat"/"Twat" (1979), Epic
- "The It Man" (1980), Epic
- "The Day My Pad Went Mad" (1982), Epic
- "Night People" (1982), Epic
- "Pity the Plight" (2012 Ill Manors album – Plan B)
- "He’s My Man (The Anniversary)" – Luvcat & John Cooper Clarke

== On screen ==
=== DVDs and videos ===
- Ten Years in an Open Necked Shirt (1982) Channel 4/British Arts Council
- Evidently, John Cooper Clarke (2012), Click Films/BBC – Evidently, John Cooper Clark is a television documentary about Clarke's life. It was directed by John Ross, produced by Scotty Clark, and was first aired on BBC Four in May 2012 as part of BBC Four and BBC 6 Music's "Punk Britannia" season. It features interviews from Bill Bailey, Pete Shelley, Paul Farley, Steve Coogan, Mark Radcliffe, Craig Charles, Plan B, Kate Nash, Alex Turner, Miranda Sawyer and Paul Morley; and poems by Clarke, including "Things Are Gonna Get Worse", "Evidently Chickentown", "Twat" and "Beasley Street". John Crace, writing for The Guardian, described the documentary as "a film that dealt in myths rather than reality" but assessed Clarke as "still clever, funny and relevant." Mark Monahan in The Daily Telegraph wrote that the programme "veered too close to comfort towards hagiography" but "was nevertheless perhaps a fair reflection of the affection with which [Clarke] has been widely regarded."
- South of the Border – Live (2013), Click Films/Safecracker Pictures
- Ten Years In An Open-Necked Video: the (Early) Archive Performances (2016), Ozit Records

=== Selected appearances ===
- Streets (1977), Beggars Banquet – "Innocents"
- Short Circuit – Live At The Electric Circus (1978), Virgin (various artists, features Clarke performing "(You Never See a Nipple In The) Daily Express" and "I Married a Monster From Outer Space"
- Urgh! A Music War (1981), Warners – "Health Fanatic"
- The Old Grey Whistle Test Volume 3 (2004), 2 Entertain – "I Don't Want to Be Nice"
- Poets, Punks, Beatniks and Counter Culture Heroes (2010), Ozit – includes rare JCC film footage from the 1980s

== Bibliography ==
=== Poetry collections ===
- Ten Years in an Open Necked Shirt (1983), Arena
- The Luckiest Guy Alive (2018), Picador
- What (2024), Pan Macmillan, ISBN 9781035033164
- Have It (2026), Pan Macmillan, ISBN 978-1-0374-0419-1

=== Prose ===
- I Wanna Be Yours (2020), Picador, ISBN 1509896104, 978-1509896103
