= Penetration (band) =

Punk rock band from County Durham, England

- Penetration in the late 1970s

Background information
- Origin: Ferryhill, County Durham, England
- Genres: Punk rock
- Years active: 1976–1980; 2001–present
- Label: Virgin
- Members: Pauline Murray; Robert Blamire; Steve Wallace; Paul Harvey; John Maher; Ken Goodinson
- Past members: Gary Chaplin; Gary Smallman; Fred Purser; Neale Floyd; Graham Kaye; Billy Gilbert; Brian Atkinson; Kev Hodgson

Penetration are a punk rock band from Ferryhill, County Durham, England formed in 1976. They re-formed in 2001 with several new members. Their debut single, "Don't Dictate", is now acknowledged as a classic punk rock single and their debut studio album, Moving Targets (1978), is still widely admired.

The band's lineup was lead singer Pauline Murray, Robert Blamire (bass), Gary Smallman (drums) and Gary Chaplin (guitar). Chaplin left in March 1978 being replaced with Neale Floyd, with second guitarist Fred Purser (later of NWOBHM act Tygers of Pan Tang) joining in July. The band dissolved in late 1979. They reformed in 2001 with original members Murray, Blamire and Smallman, and Steve Wallace and Paul Harvey drafted in as new guitarists.

== Band history ==
=== Early days ===
Formed in Ferryhill as The Points, under which name they played their first gig, at the Rock Garden pub in Middlesbrough in October 1976, they changed the band's name after a 1973 song by Iggy & The Stooges. Their second gig was supporting The Stranglers at Newcastle City Hall. Significantly, the band also played at the club The Roxy during its first 100 days. On 9 April 1977, the band appeared on the same bill as Generation X. They were also supported by Joy Division (then named "Warsaw") in May 1977, who were performing their very first gig. Early in their career, the band also supported The Vibrators and toured with Buzzcocks.

=== Albums ===
After the release of their second single, Penetration recorded the first of two sessions for John Peel at BBC Radio 1 in July 1978. Later that year, the band released their debut album. Moving Targets was number 6 in the Sounds Critics' albums of the year; and it made number 13 in the NME critics' chart.

In 1979, they toured Europe, the US and Britain but the grueling schedule began to take its toll. A disappointing reaction to Coming Up For Air, the second album, was the final nail in the coffin of the original band. After the band split in October, an official bootleg album called Race Against Time was released, which was a collection of early demos and live tracks.

=== Post-split ===
In 1980, Pauline Murray collaborated with The Invisible Girls, which also included Robert Blamire, as well as other Manchester musicians such as Vini Reilly, guitarist in The Durutti Column, and Steve Hopkins. John Maher from Buzzcocks drummed for the band. Produced by Martin Hannett, the resulting album spawned the singles "Dream Sequence" and "Mr.X", with a further non-album single "Searching for Heaven" released in 1981. Murray also provided guest vocals for The Only Ones' 1980 track, "Fools". Former guitarist Gary Chaplin formed the short-lived new wave bands The Rhythm Clicks, which released the single "Short Time" in 1980, and Soul On Ice which released the singles "Underwater" and "Widescreen" in 1982 and 1983 respectively.

Pauline Murray worked sporadically as a solo artist under the name 'Pauline Murray and The Storm' with Robert Blamire, Tim Johnston and Paul Harvey. Paul Harvey is also a Stuckist artist. Blamire also worked as a producer for various groups, including Scars, whose sole LP (1981's Author! Author!) he produced.

A decidedly more "rawk" proposition than many of the three-chord trainee anarchists on the scene, Murray drawing inevitable comparisons with both Patti Smith and Siouxsie Sioux for her force of personality and the strength / style of her voice.

=== Relaunch ===
In 2015, Penetration announced the release of a new album called Resolution in October. The current lineup of the band is Pauline Murray, Robert Blamire, John Maher (ex-Buzzcocks), Paul Harvey and Steve Wallace.

== Discography ==
=== Albums ===
- Moving Targets (October 1978: Virgin) First 15,000 copies on luminous vinyl No. 22 UK Albums Chart
- Coming Up for Air (September 1979: Virgin) No. 36 UK
- Race Against Time (Official bootleg) (January 1980: Virgin / Clifdayn PEN 1)
- Resolution (October 2015: Polestar)

=== Compilation ===
- Don't Dictate: The Best of Penetration (March 1995: CDOVD 450)

=== Singles ===
- Don’t Dictate / Money Talks (November 1977: VS 192) (re-released in 1983)
- Firing Squad / Never (May 1978: VS 213)
- Life's A Gamble / V.I.P. (September 1978: VS 226)
- Danger Signs / Stone Heroes (Live) (April 1979: VS 257) (also released with an additional track "Vision", as a 12-inch single)
- Come Into The Open / Lifeline (August 1979: VS 268)
- Our World / Sea Song (17 November 2008: Damaged Goods DAMGOOD 317) (Released on black / limited edition red vinyl 500 copies and Cdr versions)
- The Feeling / Guilty) (15 March 2010: Damaged Goods DAMGOOD 353) (Limited edition yellow vinyl)
- In The Future / Race Against Time / Duty Free Technology (2017: Polestar PSTR013-7) (Black and red vinyl)
- Shake Some Action / I Don't Mind (2017: Polestar PSTR014-7) (Gold vinyl and white vinyl test pressing))

== See also ==
- List of punk bands from the United Kingdom
- List of 1970s punk rock musicians
- List of Peel Sessions
- Music of the United Kingdom (1970s)
