= Stage 5 Rep =

Theatre company in Columbus, Ohio, 2000–2002

The Stage 5 Repertory Theatre was a short-lived theatre company in Columbus, Ohio between 2000 and 2002. The company prided itself on being one of only two theatres in the Columbus area to have an agreement with Actors' Equity Association.

The company was founded by Frank Barnhart, Elaine Miracle, Jennifer Milligan, Ross Shirley, and Jess Hanks. They performed productions of Neil Simon's The Good Doctor, The Rocky Horror Show, Our Town, The Cradle Will Rock.

The theatre group operated under a special appearance contract. Following the cancellation of a planned production of Arms and the Man, Stage 5 Rep folded and its founders went on to other theatrical endeavors in the area.
