= Pauline Murray =

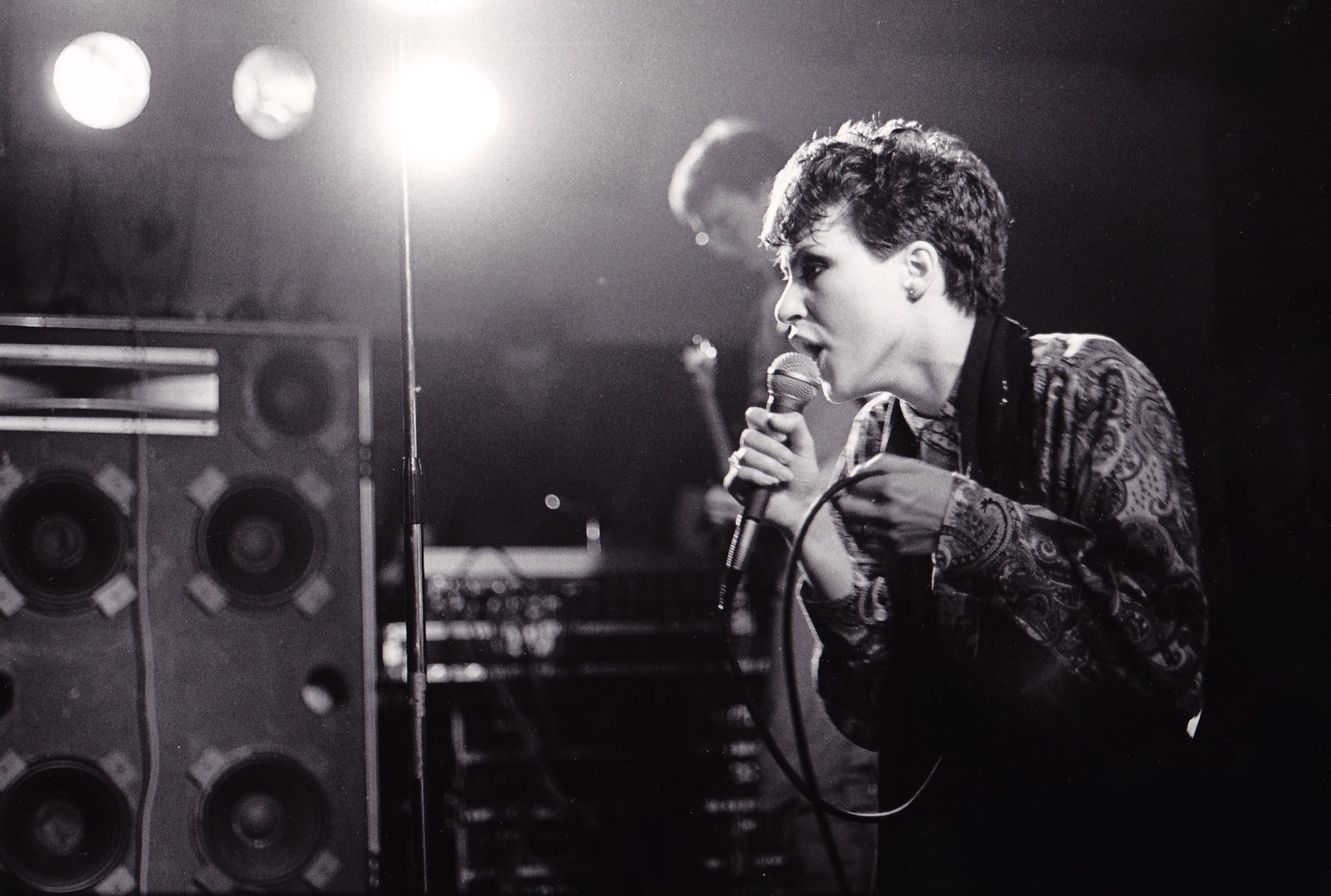
- Murray performing live with the Invisible Girls at the Paard van Troje in The Hague, Netherlands, in 1981

Background information
- Also known as: Murray
- Born: 8 March 1958 (age 68); Waterhouses, County Durham, England
- Origin: Durham, County Durham, England
- Genres: Punk rock; synth-pop; new wave; ambient; electronic
- Occupation: Singer
- Instrument: Vocals
- Years active: 1976—present
- Labels: RSO; Polestar; Cat & Mouse
- Member of: Penetration

Pauline Murray (born 8 March 1958) is best known as the lead vocalist of the punk rock band Penetration, originally formed in 1976.

== Early years ==
Pauline Murray was born on 8 March 1958 in Waterhouses, County Durham, England, and her parents later moved to Ferryhill. She left school at age sixteen, studied art at Darlington College and then worked at odd jobs. In May 1976 the 18-year-old Murray saw the Sex Pistols perform, and she and her Ferryhill comrades became Pistols devotees, earning for themselves the title of "Durham Contingent" (coined by the NME).

== Penetration ==
In late 1976, Murray formed a band with friends Robert Blamire and Gary Smallman and named it after the Stooges' song "Penetration" from Raw Power (1973). They played their first gig in October 1976 at the Middlesbrough Rock Garden, and played their first gig in London at The Roxy in January 1977, supporting Gen X.

The band debuted on vinyl with the single "Don't Dictate", issued by Virgin Records in November of the same year. The band went on to release two studio albums, Moving Targets (1978) and Coming Up for Air (1979), as well as an official bootleg, Race Against Time (1980). Later there would be a Best of Penetration compilation album. After a measure of success during 1978/79, including a headline show at the Rainbow Theatre and a five-week American tour, they announced a split in October 1979.

Penetration played a number of gigs around London in 2001–2002, leading to a band reunion. In 2015 the band announced they would release Resolution, a new studio album.

== Solo work ==
In 1980 Murray worked on her first solo studio album with record producer Martin Hannett's band the Invisible Girls, which also included ex-Penetration member and co-writer Robert Blamire, as well as guesting Manchester musicians such as Vini Reilly, guitarist in the Durutti Column, and Steve Hopkins. John Maher from Buzzcocks also drummed for the band. The resulting album, Pauline Murray and The Invisible Girls, reached Number 25 on the UK Albums Chart in October 1980 and spawned the singles "Dream Sequence" and "Mr. X". The album was well received by critics. A reviewer for Melody Maker called it, "Unquestionably a musical highpoint of this year or any other. An exciting new area of electronic pop where Motown meets the modern world."

Murray also provided lead vocals for the Only Ones on their song "Fools" and backing vocals on "Me and My Shadow".

In the early 1980s, Murray formed the band Pauline Murray and the Storm, with Robert Blamire (bass), Tim Johnston (drums) and Paul Harvey (guitar), releasing the singles "Holocaust" in 1984, a cover of Alex Chilton/Big Star and the self-penned "New Age" in 1986. In 1989 Murray released the EP This Thing Called Love and the studio album Storm Clouds under her own name.

In 2011 Murray established Polestar Studios with Robert Blamire in Byker where bands can rent out rehearsal and recording space. In 2013 she booked a number of solo acoustic dates around the North East in the UK. She said about the gigs, "This is the first time in my career that I’ve done a full solo set with just me and my guitar." During the tour, she played a number of older songs from her career and also played a number of new songs she had recently written.

On 25 September 2021 Murray released a new solo studio album Elemental, the 10 tracks of which had been recorded in 2016.

== Personal life ==
Murray was married to Peter Lloyd, Penetration's road manager, but split with her husband after the release of Searching for Heaven in 1980. She and Robert Blamire then became a couple and moved together to Liverpool. She currently resides in Newcastle upon Tyne. Murray has two children.

== Discography ==
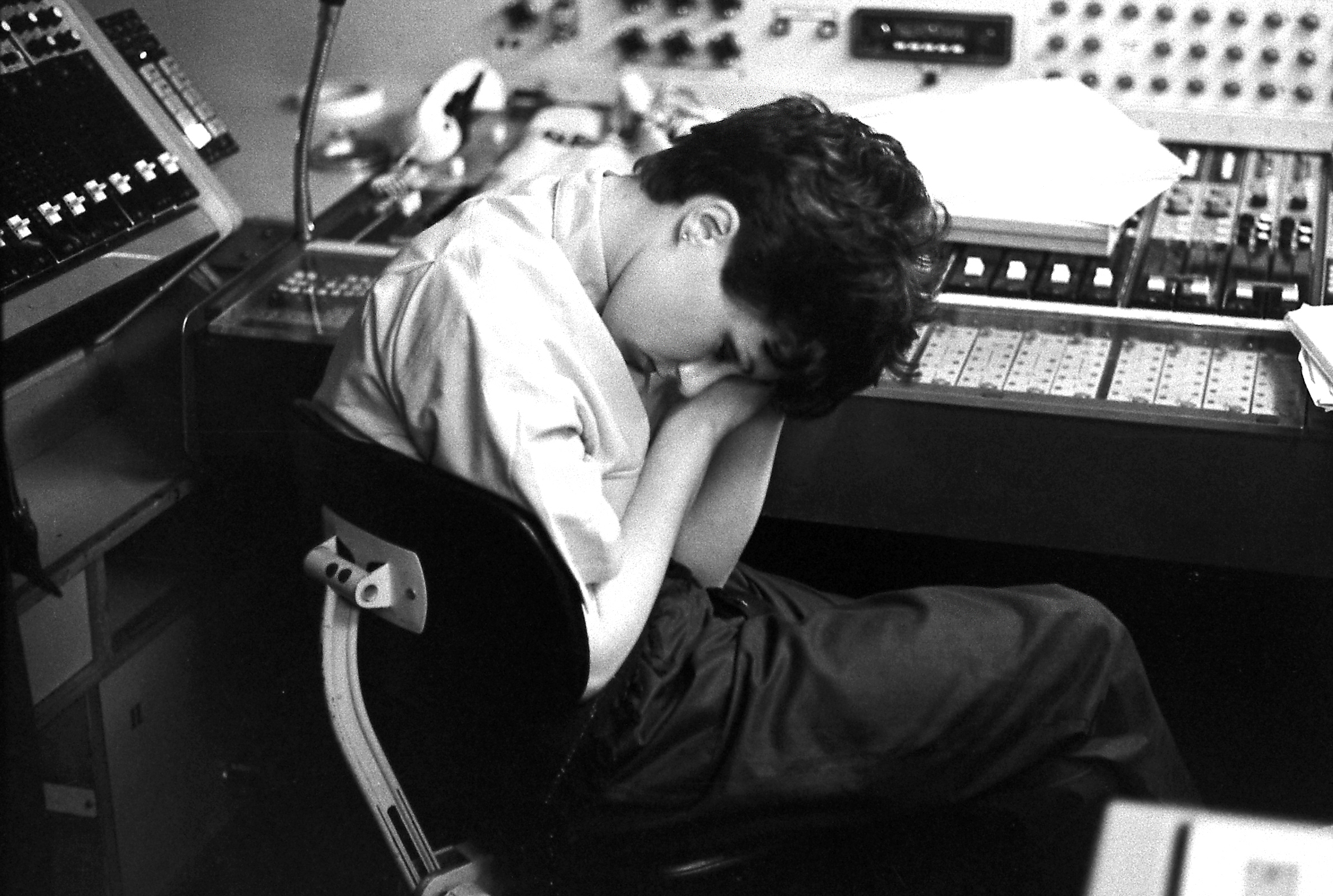
Murray in 1981

All UK releases except as noted.

=== Pauline Murray and the Invisible Girls ===
- Dream Sequences (7", Illusive IVE-1, 11 July 1980)
  - Dream Sequence I / Dream Sequence II
  - also on 10" IVEX-1
- Pauline Murray and The Invisible Girls (LP, Illusive/RSO, 2394 277, 3 October 1980)
  - Screaming in the Darkness (3:36) / Dream Sequence 1 (3:19) / European Eyes (3:20) / Shoot You Down (2:07) / Sympathy (2:47) / Time Slipping (4:04) // Drummer Boy (3:03) / Thundertunes (3:23) / When Will We Learn (3:35) / / Mr. X (4:27) / Judgement Day (4:25)
  - 1993 CD extra tracks: The Visitor (3:44) / Animal Crazy (3:16) / Searching For Heaven (2:59)
- Mr X (3:27) / Two Shots (4:03) (7", Illusive IVE-2, 24 October 1980)
- Searching for Heaven / Animal Crazy (7", Illusive IVE-3, April 1981)
- Searching for Heaven // Animal Crazy / The Visitor (10", Illusive IVEX-3, 1981)

=== Pauline Murray and the Storm ===
- New Age (3:42) / Body Music (2:54) (7", Polestar PSTR-003, November 1986)
- New Age (5:35) // Archangel (4:17) / Body Music (2:54) (12", Polestar PSTR-12-003, November 1986)

=== Pauline Murray and the Saint ===
- Hong Kong (12", Polestar PSTR-12-002, February 1987)
  - Close Watch / All I Want // Body Music / Holocaust

=== Pauline Murray ===
- Holocaust (2:20) / Don't Give Up (3:56) (7", Polestar PSTR-001, November 1984)
- Holocaust // Don't Give Up / Aversion (12", Polestar PSTR-12-001, November 1984)
- This Thing Called Love // Mr Money / Pressure Zone (12", Cat & Mouse Records ABBO-9T, May 1989)
- Storm Clouds (LP, Cat And Mouse ABB-10, 1989)
  - This Thing Called Love (3:34) / Holocaust (2:19) / Soul Power (3:10) / No One Like You (2:57) / Another World (3:03) / Don't Give Up (4:58) // Pressure Zone (4:23) / Close Watch (3:07) / Everybody's Talking (3:06) / New Age (3:51) / Time (4:52)
- Halloween 2000 (CD, Polestar PSTR-CD-002, 2000)
  - Stand for the Fire Demon (5:47) / Night of the Vampire (4:58) / Creature with the Atom Brain (4:25)
- Elemental (LP, Polestar Records) 25 September 2021
