= Martin Hannett =

Musical artist & record producer (1948–1991)

- Hannett c. 1980

Background information
- Also known as: Zero; Martin "Zero" Hannett
- Born: 31 May 1948; Manchester, England
- Died: 18 April 1991 (aged 42) Manchester, England
- Occupations: Record producer; musician
- Years active: 1975–1991

James Martin Hannett (also known as 'Martin Zero') (31 May 1948 – 18 April 1991), was an English record producer, musician, and an original partner and director at Tony Wilson's Factory Records. He was also a co-founder of the musicians' collective Music Force, and the record label Rabid in the late 1970s.

He became especially associated with Joy Division and also produced music by artists including the Durutti Column, A Certain Ratio, Magazine, John Cooper Clarke, New Order, Orchestral Manoeuvres in the Dark, Basement 5, and Happy Mondays. His distinctive production style embraced atmospheric sounds and electronics.

== Early life and education ==
James Martin Hannett was born in Manchester, England, on 31 May 1948. He grew up in a working-class, Catholic family in Miles Platting, Manchester. Hannett's uncle was a bass player and gave his nephew a bass guitar when he was 14. He attended Corpus Christi school and Xaverian College in Rusholme. In 1967, he went to the University of Manchester Institute of Science and Technology (UMIST), where he earned a degree in chemistry but did not pursue the profession.

== Career ==
In the early 1970s, Hannett co-founded a musicians' collective, Music Force, along with Tosh Ryan, Bruce Mitchell and others, and during this time organised gigs. He played bass with Spider Mike King and as a member in a band called Paradox, in 1973, alongside Paul Young, later of Sad Café and Mike + The Mechanics.

Hannett's production work began with the soundtrack for the animated film All Kinds of Heroes, written by future collaborator Steve Hopkins. By this time, he also began to mix live sound at pub gigs. Other early production works included Greasy Bear, Belt & Braces Road Show Band's eponymous album in 1975 and five songs from Pete Farrow's repertoire recorded at Pennine Studios, Oldham, later included on the compilation album Who Says There's No Beach in Stockport. Hannett attracted more musical attention in 1977, when, as Martin Zero, he produced the first independent punk rock record, Buzzcocks' Spiral Scratch EP. Under the same moniker he produced early records by punk poet John Cooper Clarke, whose Salford monotone was complemented by drum machines, simple synthesiser motifs and Hannett's bass playing. Jilted John's eponymous debut single was Hannett's first hit single as a producer.

Having made some money running Music Force, Hannett and Ryan set up the independent record label Rabid Records, which released the debut single by Slaughter and the Dogs (also produced by Hannett). It was also responsible for producing and releasing Clarke's first EP, Innocents EP (1977), and his first album, Où est la maison de fromage?, in 1978.

Hannett then became closely associated with Joy Division, he drew influence from German krautrock producer Conny Plank who treated the recording studio as an instrument. Hannett's production of Joy Division albums and singles incorporated looping technology to treat musical notes with filters, echoes and delays. The Cargo Recording Studios in Rochdale were used for the recording of the Joy Division songs "Digital", "Glass", "Atmosphere", "Dead Souls" and "Ice Age". Hannett's unorthodox production methods resulted in drum sounds mixed with synthesisers that were complex and highly distinctive. According to Hannett: "There was a lot of space in [Joy Division's] sound. They were a gift to a producer, because they didn't have a clue. They didn't argue. A Factory Sample was the first thing I did with them. I think I'd had the new AMS delay line for about two weeks. It was called 'Digital'. It was heaven sent." He went on to produce all of Joy Division's studio recorded output, including their two albums Unknown Pleasures and Closer and single "Love Will Tear Us Apart", which became a hit following the suicide of lead singer Ian Curtis. Hannett continued working with the remaining members of the band following their regrouping as New Order, but their relationship broke down during the recording of their debut album Movement, culminating in Hannett walking out during the mixing for the single "Everything's Gone Green".

Hannett produced U2's first international single, "11 O'Clock Tick Tock", which was released in May 1980. He was set to produce their debut album, Boy, but after the suicide of Curtis, Hannett was too distraught to work and backed out. A rift developed with Factory, leading Hannett to sue the label in 1982 over various financial matters. The dispute was settled out of court, and the lawsuit is listed as part of the Factory Records catalogue as FAC61.

== Personal life and death ==
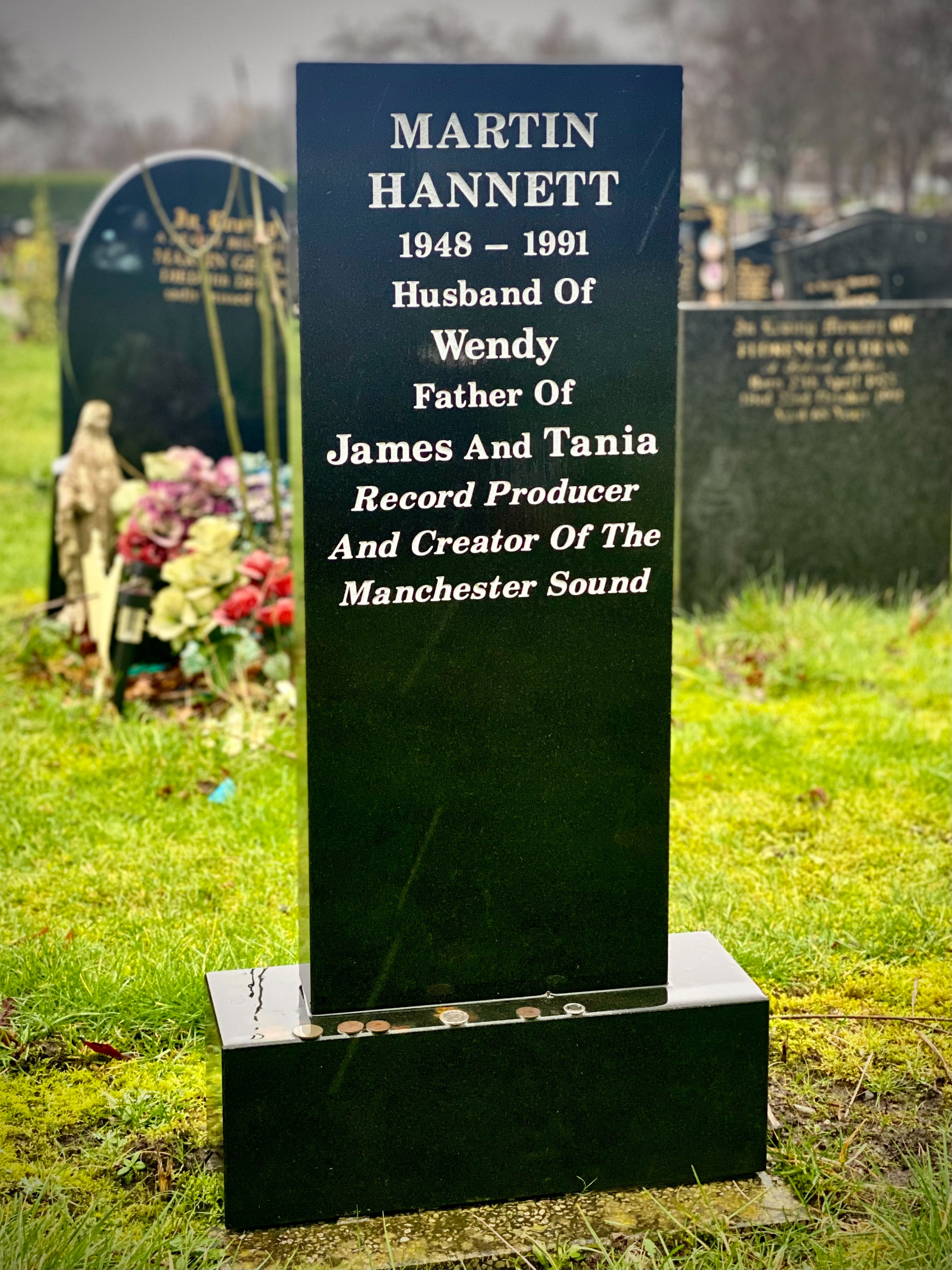
Martin Hannett's grave in Southern Cemetery, Manchester

After leaving Factory, Hannett's career declined due to his heavy use of alcohol and heroin. He later married his new partner Wendy. Hannett died on 18 April 1991 at the age of 42 in Manchester, as a result of heart failure. His headstone at Southern Cemetery, Manchester pays him tribute as being the creator of "The Manchester Sound". His children are listed on the headstone as James and Tania.

== Legacy ==
Several weeks after his death, Factory Records released the compilation album Martin: The Work of Martin Hannett (FACT325) as a tribute, collecting his work as a producer. In 2007, Colin Sharp published Who Killed Martin Hannett?, a memoir based on interviews with Hannett's friends and collaborators. Sharp had previously been a member of The Durutti Column and was friends with Hannett during his time in the Manchester scene.

Hannett was portrayed by Andy Serkis in the 2002 film 24 Hour Party People, a fictionalised depiction of Tony Wilson's career as the co-founder of Factory Records and The Haçienda nightclub. In the DVD commentary for the film, Wilson notes a review that described Hannett as Serkis's "strangest role" and points out that the actor is best known for his portrayal of Gollum in Peter Jackson's The Lord of the Rings trilogy. Wilson concludes that the reviewer's implication is correct, that indeed, Hannett was far stranger than the Lord of the Rings character. Hannett was portrayed by Ben Naylor in Anton Corbijn's 2007 film Control, a biopic of Ian Curtis.

A film documentary about Hannett's life was released on DVD on the 23rd anniversary of his death on 10 April 2014. A book was released on the same day, Martin Hannett – Pleasures of the Unknown by Chris Hewitt. Another book by Hewitt, Martin Hannett, His Equipment and Strawberry Studios, was published on 26 January 2016 to coincide with the 50th anniversary of Strawberry Recording Studios, where Hannett recorded with Joy Division.

== Selected discography ==
=== Albums produced ===
- Belt & Braces Road Show Band – Belt & Braces Road Show Band LP 1975 private pressing – rare- tracks issued on Hannett Maverick Producer compilation CD
- Pete Farrow, Who Says There's No Beach in Stockport? recorded 1977 issued 2001 on CD by Ozit Morpheus and on Maverick Producer Hannett compilation CD
- John Cooper Clarke – Disguise in Love 1978
- Jilted John – True Love Stories 1978
- The Durutti Column – The Return of the Durutti Column 1979
- Joy Division – Unknown Pleasures 1979
- Pauline Murray and the Invisible Girls – Pauline Murray and the Invisible Girls 1979
- Basement 5 – 1965–1980 and In Dub 1980
- John Cooper Clarke – Snap, Crackle & Bop 1980
- Joy Division – Closer 1980
- Magazine – The Correct Use of Soap 1980
- The Psychedelic Furs – The Psychedelic Furs 1980 (songs "Susan's Strange" and "Soap Commercial")
- Various Artists – A Factory Quartet 1980 – Three tracks by The Durutti Column and six by The Royal Family and the Poor. The double album on Factory Records also featured a side each from Kevin Hewick and Blurt
- A Certain Ratio – To Each... 1981
- Joy Division – Still 1981
- Magazine – Magic, Murder and the Weather (1981) – mixed
- New Order – Movement 1981
- Section 25 – Always Now (1981)
- John Cooper Clarke – Zip Style Method (1982)
- The Names – Swimming (1982)
- Orchestre Rouge – Yellow Laughter 1982
- Armande Altaï – Nocturne Flamboyant (1983)
- Blue in Heaven – All the Gods Men (1985)
- The Stone Roses – The Martin Hannett album (1985) (Finally released as Garage Flower, coupled with the single "So Young" in 1996)
- Walk the Walk – Walk the Walk (1987)
- Happy Mondays – Bummed (1988)
- The High – Somewhere Soon (1990)
- Joy Division – Martin Hannett's Personal Mixes (2007)
- Joy Division – In the Studio with Martin Hannett (2008)

=== Singles and EPs produced ===
- Buzzcocks, Spiral Scratch 1976 as Martin Zero
- Slaughter and the Dogs, "Cranked Up Really High" 1977 as Martin Zero
- Jilted John, "Jilted John" 1978
- Joy Division, "Transmission" 1979
- Orchestral Manoeuvres in the Dark, "Almost" 1979 as Martin Zero
- A Certain Ratio, "Flight" 1979/1980
- A Certain Ratio, Do the Du EP 1980
- Kevin Hewick, "Haystack" 1980
- Joy Division, "Love Will Tear Us Apart" 1980
- Buzzcocks, Are Everything, Strange Thing 1980
- U2, "11 O'Clock Tick Tock" 1980
- Pauline Murray and the Invisible Girls, "Mr X" 1980
- Pauline Murray and the Invisible Girls, "Searching for Heaven" 1981
- Crispy Ambulance, "Live on a Hot August Night" 1981
- ESG, ESG
- Kissing the Pink, "Don't Hide in the Shadows" 1981
- New Order, "Ceremony" 1981
- New Order, "Everything's Gone Green" 1981
- New Order, "Procession" 1981
- Minny Pops, "Dolphin's Spurt" 1981
- Tunnelvision, "Watching the Hydroplanes" 1981
- Stockholm Monsters, "Fairy Tales" 1981
- The Names, "Nightshift" 1980
- The Names, "Calcutta" 1981
- The Names, "The Astronaut" 1982
- Blue in Heaven, "Across My Heart" (version) 1984
- The Stone Roses, "So Young"/"Tell Me" 1985
- Kit, "Overshadowing Me" 1990
- Kitchens of Distinction, "Quick as Rainbows" 1990
- New Fast Automatic Daffodils, "Get Better" 1991
- World of Twist, "She's a Rainbow" 1991
- Wasted Youth, "Rebecca's Room" 1981
- Chris Sievey, "Camouflage" 1983
- Urban Shakedown, "Wolves (Big Bad)" 1982.

=== Compilations ===
- Martin: The Work of Martin Hannett (Factory Records, 1991)
- And Here is the Young Man (Debutante, 1998)
- Zero: A Martin Hannett Story 1977–1991' (Big Beat, 2006)
- Martin Hannett: Maverick Producer, Genius and Musician (Ozit Morpheus Records Sept 2011)
