= Stephen Hopkins (musician) =

British former musician (born 1951)

Steve Hopkins
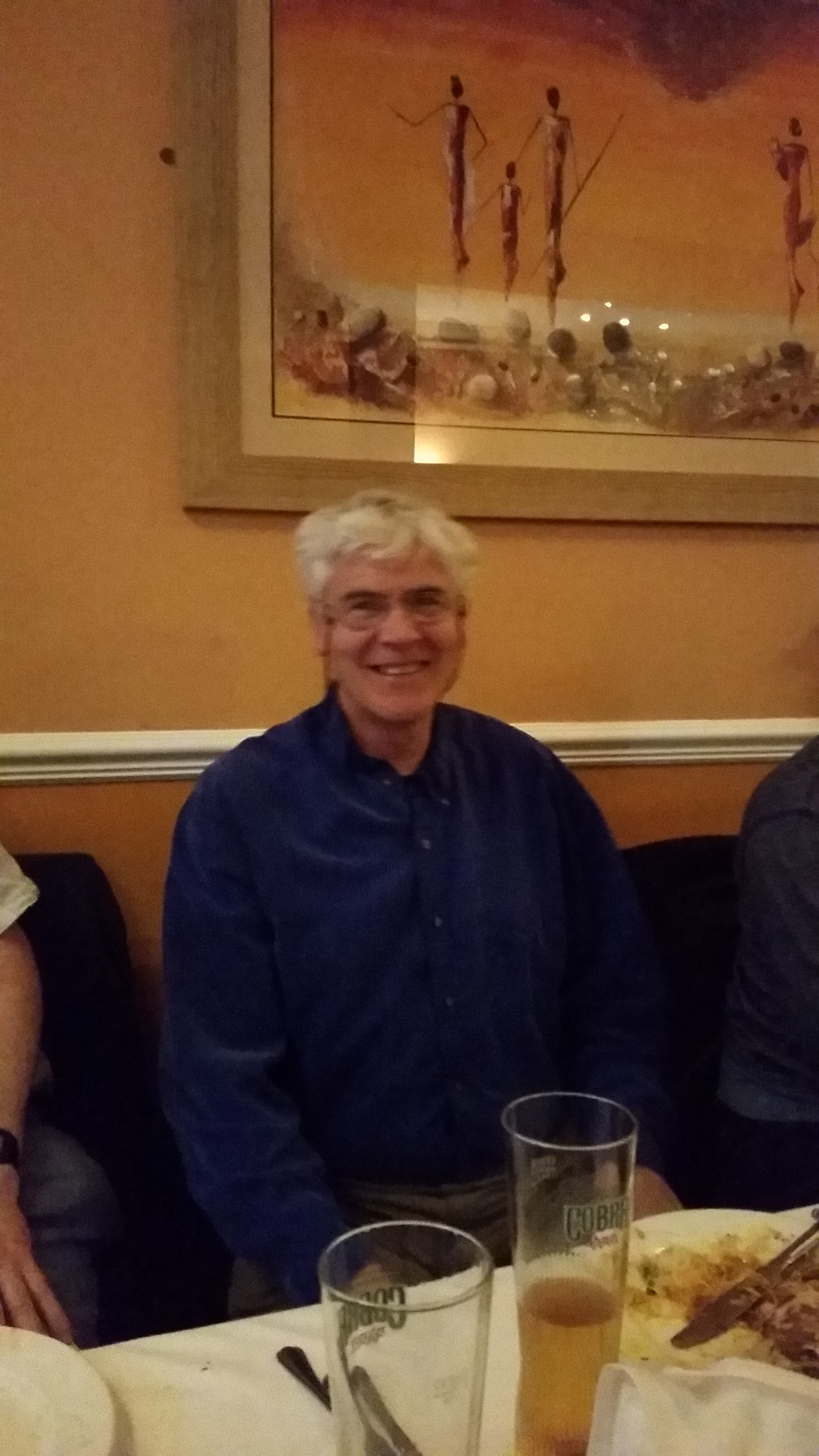
- Stephen Hopkins, 2016

Background information
- Also known as: Stephen Hopkins
- Born: 14 May 1951 (age 74)
- Origin: Manchester, England
- Genres: New wave, synthpop, post-punk
- Occupation(s): Musician, physicist, plumber
- Instrument(s): keyboards, piano
- Years active: 1970–1990
- Website: Steve Hopkins personal web pages

Stephen Hopkins (born 14 May 1951) is a British former musician who worked (as Steve Hopkins) with different Manchester punk and new wave artists including John Cooper Clarke, Pauline Murray, Morrissey and Ed Garrity amongst others. After retiring as a musician, he pursued a career in experimental cold atom physics.

== Biography ==
Between 1970 and 1990, Hopkins worked as a musician. He was primarily a session keyboard player and pianist. However, during his career he also worked as a composer, programmer, lounge lizard, record producer, teacher and recording engineer. His role began to be shown with his collaboration with John Cooper Clarke, playing keyboards and co-producing his discs alongside producer Martin Hannett. Both formed The Invisible Girls in Salford to be the Cooper Clarke's backing band in the rest of the years. However, the band also helped to relaunch the careers of former Penetration singer Pauline Murray, with whom they released one album and two singles between 1980 and 1981, and of Nico, of Velvet Underground fame.

Hopkins also collaborated with Jilted John, Ed Garrity (former Ed Banger and the Nosebleeds frontman), and later with Morrissey and Distant Cousins.

Following his music career, in 1991, he began a PhD in experimental atomic physics at the Open University. This was followed by postdoctoral positions at Oxford and Sussex, as well as a teaching fellow post at the Manchester Photon Science Institute. In 2010 he joined the Atomic and Molecular Physics group at Durham University where he worked as a postdoctoral researcher until 2016.

His father is Billy Hopkins, author of seven bestsellers, including Our Kid and Kate's Story. His sister is the author Cathy Hopkins, best known for her teenage books Mates, Dates series.
