= The Durutti Column discography =

- Studio albums: 21
- EPs: 6
- Live albums: 4
- Compilation albums: 13
- Singles: 13
- Video albums: 2
- Box sets: 3
- Other albums: 4

This is the discography of English post-punk band the Durutti Column.

== Albums ==
=== Studio albums ===
Title	Album details	Peak chart positions	
Title	Album details	UK	UK Indie
The Return of the Durutti Column	Released: January 1980; Label: Factory; Formats: LP	—	7
LC	Released: November 1981; Label: Factory; Formats: LP	—	12
Another Setting	Released: August 1983; Label: Factory; Formats: LP	—	4
Without Mercy	Released: December 1984; Label: Factory; Formats: LP, MC	—	8
Circuses and Bread	Released: May 1986; Label: Factory; Formats: CD, LP, MC	—	11
The Guitar and Other Machines	Released: 30 November 1987; Label: Factory; Formats: CD, LP, MC, DAT	—	13
Vini Reilly	Released: March 1989; Label: Factory; Formats: CD, LP, MC, DAT	—	5
Obey the Time	Released: December 1990; Label: Factory; Formats: CD, LP, MC	—	—
Sex and Death	Released: 14 November 1994; Label: Factory Too/London; Formats: CD, MC	—	—
Fidelity	Released: April 1996; Label: Les Disques du Crépuscule; Formats: CD; Belgium-only release	—	—
Time Was Gigantic... When We Were Kids	Released: October 1998; Label: Factory Too/London; Formats: CD	—	—
Rebellion	Released: June 2001; Label: Artful/Universal; Formats: CD	—	—
Someone Else's Party	Released: 3 March 2003; Label: Artful/Universal; Formats: CD	—	—
Tempus Fugit	Released: 17 May 2004; Label: Kooky; Formats: CD	—	—
Keep Breathing	Released: 30 January 2006; Label: Artful; Formats: CD	—	—
Idiot Savants	Released: 30 July 2007; Label: Fullfill; Formats: CD, digital download	—	—
Sunlight to Blue... Blue to Blackness	Released: 23 June 2008; Label: Kooky; Formats: CD, digital download	—	—
Love in the Time of Recession	Released: 2 March 2009; Label: Artful; Formats: CD, digital download	—	—
A Paean to Wilson	Released: 24 January 2010; Label: Kooky; Formats: 2×CD, digital download	—	—
Short Stories for Pauline (Note: Though recorded in 1983 and despite being given a catalogue number at the time, this album was not released in its originally intended form until 2012. Previous to this, tracks had been shared between the 1991 Lips That Would Kiss compilation and the LTM reissue of Circuses and Bread. In 2013, it was reissued again by LTM with Live in Bruxelles 13 August 1981 as a second CD.)	Released: 18 June 2012; Label: Factory Benelux; Formats: 2×CD, LP, digital download; Previously unreleased album recorded in 1983	—	—
Renascent	Released: 31 July 2026; Label: London; Formats: CD, vinyl, digital download	54	1
"—" denotes releases that did not chart or were not released in that territory.

=== Live albums ===
Title	Album details
Live at the Venue London	Released: June 1983; Label: VU; Formats: LP; Limited release
Domo Arigato	Released: October 1985; Label: Factory; Formats: CD, LP, MC
Live at the Bottom Line New York	Released: 23 November 1987; Label: ROIR; Formats: MC
Live in Bruxelles 13.8.1981	Released: 4 February 2008; Label: LTM; Formats: CD

=== Compilation albums ===
Title	Album details
Valuable Passages	Released: December 1986; Label: Factory; Formats: CD, 2xLP, MC, 2xMC
The Sporadic Recordings	Released: December 1989; Label: TTTTTTTTT; Formats: CD; Limited release of demos and unreleased material; credited to Vini Reilly, not DC
Lips That Would Kiss (Form Prayers to Broken Stone)	Released: March 1991; Label: Factory Benelux; Formats: CD
Dry	Released: 1991; Label: Materiali Sonori; Formats: CD; Italy-only release; collection of previously unreleased mid and late 1980s material
Red Shoes	Released: 1992; Label: Materiali Sonori; Formats: CD; Italy-only release; collection of previously unreleased mid 1980s material and Greetings Three EP
Return of the Sporadic Recordings	Released: 1 July 2002; Label: Kooky; Formats: 2xCD; Limited release
Faith	Released: 8 May 2004; Label: Kooky; Formats: CD
The Best of the Durutti Column	Released: 11 October 2004; Label: Warner; Formats: 2xCD
Sub Group '06	Released: 2006; Label: Kooky; Formats: CD; Collection of unreleased tracks, demos and outtakes
Sporadic Three	Released: 2 April 2007; Label: Kooky; Formats: CD; Collection of rare and previously unreleased material
At Twilight	Released: 6 May 2016; Label: Les Disques du Crépuscule; Formats: digital download
M24J (Anthology)	Released: 20 September 2018; Label: Factory Benelux; Formats: 2xCD, 2xLP
Deux Triangles	Released: 17 July 2021; Label: Factory Benelux; Formats: 2xLP; Limited release; expanded release of the 1981 EP

=== Box sets ===
Title	Album details
The First Four Albums	Released: 1 February 1988; Label: Factory; Formats: 4xCD
Four Factory Records	Released: 14 September 2009; Label: Kooky; Formats: 6xCD; Limited release
2001–2009	Released: 2 November 2009; Label: Artful; Formats: 5xCD; Limited release

=== Video albums ===
Title	Album details
Domo Arigato	Released: October 1985; Label: Factory; Formats: VHS, Betamax
When the World	Released: February 1988; Label: Factory; Formats: CD-V

=== Other albums ===
Title	Album details	Peak chart positions
Title	Album details	UK Indie
Amigos em Portugal	Released: December 1983; Label: Fundação Atlântica; Formats: LP, MC; Portugal-only release	11
Heaven Sent (It Was Called Digital. It Was Heaven Sent)	Released: March 2005; Label: F4; Formats: digital download; Release was exclusively available via the F4 website	—
Treatise on the Steppenwolf	Released: 4 August 2008; Label: LTM; Formats: CD; Soundtrack of incidental music to theatre performance – mostly reworkings of recent material	—
Chronicle	Released: 30 April 2011; Label: Kooky; Formats: CD; Limited release available exclusively to attendees at the Durutti Column's Bridgewater Hall concert on 30 April 2011; Limited expanded reissue in 2014 as Chronicle XL	—
"—" denotes releases that did not chart or were not released in that territory.

== EPs ==
Title	Album details	Peak chart positions
Title	Album details	UK Indie
Deux Triangles	Released: October 1982; Label: Factory Benelux; Formats: 12"; Belgium-only release	—
Say What You Mean, Mean What You Say	Released: March 1985; Label: Factory; Formats: 12"	5
Greetings Three	Released: January 1986; Label: Materiali Sonori; Formats: 12"; Italy-only release	—
The City of Our Lady (with Debi Diamond)	Released: August 1987; Label: Factory; Formats: 12"	46
WOMAD Live	Released: 1989; Label: Factory; Formats: CD	—
A Collection of Bonus Tracks from 2001–2009	Released: 6 December 2009; Label: Fullfill; Formats: digital download	—
"—" denotes releases that did not chart or were not released in that territory.

== Singles ==
Title	Year	Peak chart positions	Album
Title	Year	UK Indie	Album
"Lips That Would Kiss" (Belgium-only release)	1980	—	Non-album singles
"Enigma" (France-only limited release)	1981	—	Non-album singles
"Sketch for Summer" (Australia-only release)	1981	—	The Return of the Durutti Column
"Weakness & Fever" (Belgium-only release)	1982	—	Non-album singles
"I Get Along Without You Very Well"/"Prayer"	1983	30	Non-album singles
"Love Fading" (Japan-only release)	1984	—	Non-album singles
"Tomorrow" (Belgium-only release)	1986	15	Circuses and Bread
"Our Lady of the Angels"	1987	—	Non-album singles
"The Together Mix" (credited to Vini Reilly; promo-only release)	1991	—	Non-album singles
"Voluntary Arrangement" (promo-only release)	2002	—	Rebellion
"Woman" (promo-only release)	2003	—	Someone Else's Party
"Cup a Soup Romance" (limited release)	2008	—	Sunlight to Blue... Blue to Blackness
"Free from All the Chaos" (featuring Caoilfhionn Rose; limited release)	2020	—	Non-album single
"—" denotes releases that did not chart or were not released in that territory.
