= Renascent (album) =

Studio album by the Durutti Column
- Released: 31 July 2026
- Length: 41:32
- Label: London
- Producer: Keir Stewart

The Durutti Column chronology
| Short Stories for Pauline (2012) | Renascent (2026) |

Singles from Renascent
- 1. "Liars" Released: 27 May 2026; 2. "Scammer" Released: 1 July 2026

Renascent is the 28th album by the English post-punk band the Durutti Column, released on 31 July 2026. It is the band's first album of new material since 2010's A Paean to Wilson, making it their first release in over 15 years.

== Background ==
A reissue of the band's 1980 debut album The Return of the Durutti Column was made by London Records in November 2025 to mark its 45th anniversary. A renewed wave of attention was given to the band in the surrounding period, with figures such as Frank Ocean and Yung Lean being admirers.

The year before the album, the Durutti Column were sampled on Blood Orange's single "The Field", and a tribute to frontman Vini Reilly and the band was organised as part of Meltdown Festival 2026, curated by Harry Styles, titled "For Vini: A Tribute to the Durutti Column", taking place on 16 June.

== Production ==
Work on the album started as early as 2017, though sporadically; production picked up pace during the Covid lockdowns. Long time collaborators drummer Bruce Mitchell and multi-instrumentalist Keir Stewart worked on the album alongside Reilly, while Mancunian singer-songwriter Caoilfhionn Rose (slated to be part of the tribute to the band at Meltdown) sang on two tracks and played piano on another. Mitchell described Reilly's work as "constantly surprising", while Reilly said "every single piece of music writes itself"; a press released called it a "symbolic return to origins". The artwork for the album was created by design studio 8vo, with whom the band had worked since their days on Factory Records, the album was also given a Factory Too catalogue number, in collaboration with Oliver Wilson, son of Tony Wilson.

Recording sessions for the album were informal, often taking place in Reilly's kitchen, minimal studio equipment was used, with Stewart serving as producer. The tenth track, "For Friends Everywhere", is a reworked version of the band's early track "For Belgian Friends", given in a new orchestral arrangement.

== Release ==
The lead single, "Liars", released on 27 May 2026, was described Robin Murray of Clash as "perfume-esque in its exquisite formlessness". It was given its first play on the evening of 26 May 2026 on BBC Radio 6 Music, on Riley & Coe. A second single, "Scammer", was released at the beginning of July.

The final track, "All They See Is Fire" is a CD/digital exclusive. An exclusive vinyl version of the album was also produced, limited to 500 copies.

== Reception ==
Professional ratings
Aggregate scores
| Source | Rating |
|---|---|
| Any Decent Music | 7.7/10 |
| Metacritic | 82/100 |
Review scores
| Source | Rating |
| Louder Than War | 5/5 stars |
| MusicOMH | 4.5/5 stars |
| Pitchfork | 7.0/10 |
| Record Collector | 4/5 stars |
| Uncut | 4/5 stars |

Any Decent Music gave the album a weighted average score of 7.7 out of 10 from eleven critic scores. According to Metacritic, it received "universal acclaim" based on a weighted average score of 82 out of 100 from twelve critic scores.

Wyndham Wallace of Uncut described the album as "unquestionably poignant" regardless of circumstances, and Reilly's playing as "six-stringed sorcery". Louder Than War called the album "another beautiful piece of music".

Record Collector noted that the music might at times work as a film score, with others "edging, delicately, towards a rock album", and added that the music "ebbs and flows like a drifting sea". Ben Hogwood of MusicOMH reviewed the album positively, calling it the beginning of a "new, starlit chapter" for Reilly.

Killian Laher of No More Workhorse called it a potential "comedown soundtrack of the summer", and that it might "spark a resurgence of interest" in the band. Silent Radio called it "an incredible feat" that Renascent, the band's 28th album, was "comparable in quality" to the band's "career highlights".

Jazz Monroe, writing for Pitchfork, described the album as distilling "minimalism, romanticism, and ambient" elements into what he described as a "sort of universal music".

== Track listing ==
Renascent track listing
| No. | Title | Writer(s) | Length |
|---|---|---|---|
| 1. | "Echoes in the Memory" | Vini Reilly | 1:22 |
| 2. | "Your Shadow at Morning" | Reilly; Keir Stewart | 4:09 |
| 3. | "The Present and Time Past" | Reilly; Stewart | 5:57 |
| 4. | "Agonistes" (with Caoilfhionn Rose) | Bruce Mitchell; Reilly; Stewart | 4:05 |
| 5. | "Liars" | Reilly; Stewart | 3:46 |
| 6. | "Vapour in a Matchbox" | Reilly | 2:09 |
| 7. | "Your Shadow at Evening" | Reilly; Stewart | 4:42 |
| 8. | "Sargasso Sea" (with Caoilfhionn Rose) | Reilly | 3:24 |
| 9. | "Scammer" | Reilly; Stewart | 3:00 |
| 10. | "For Friends Everywhere" | Mitchell; Reilly; Stewart | 5:31 |
| 11. | "All They See Is Fire" (with Lucas Elliot) | Stewart; Lucas Elliot | 3:27 |
| Total length: | | | 41:32 |

== Personnel ==
Credits are adapted from Tidal.

=== The Durutti Column ===
- Bruce Mitchell – drums (tracks 4, 7)
- Vini Reilly – guitar (1–9)
- Keir Stewart – production (all tracks), keyboards (2, 3, 5, 7, 9), bass (5, 7, 9, 11); arrangement, clarinet (10); guitar (11)

=== Additional contributors ===
- Caoilfhionn Rose – vocals (8)
- Sam Morris – French horn (10)
- John Ellis – piano (10)
- Liz Rossi – violin (10)
- Lucas Elliot – vocals (11)

== Charts ==
Chart performance for Renascent
| Chart (2026) | Peak position |
|---|---|
| French Albums (SNEP) | 192 |
| Scottish Albums (Official Charts) | 6 |
| UK Albums (Official Charts) | 54 |
| UK Independent Albums (Official Charts) | 1 |
