= Without Mercy (album) =

Studio album by the Durutti Column
- Released: October 1984
- Studio: Strawberry Studios, Stockport
- Genre: Modern classical; chamber music; orchestral
- Length: 38:28
- Label: Factory
- Producer: Tony Wilson; Michael Johnson

The Durutti Column chronology
Another Setting (1983)	Without Mercy (1984)	Circuses and Bread (1986)

Without Mercy is the fourth studio album by English band The Durutti Column, released in October 1984 on Factory Records. After the band and label boss Tony Wilson were unanimous in their dislike of Another Setting (1983), Wilson pushed the band towards progressing to a new, classical-inspired sound. The band went on to record Short Stories for Pauline, which went unreleased when Wilson refused to release it, though one track, "Little Mercy", kept Wilson's attention. He asked the band to use it as the foundation for a different album, ultimately becoming Without Mercy.

With a dramatically extended line-up, featuring classical musicians such as cello player Caroline Lavelle and Tuxedomoon violinist Blaine L. Reininger, Without Mercy was recorded in Strawberry Studios. It was partly an attempt by Wilson to push Durutti Column band leader Vini Reilly into spending more than three days recording an album, although the album was recorded in only five days. The album is an album-length, two-part modern classical piece, also titled "Without Mercy", using the narrative of John Keats' poem "La Belle Dame sans Merci", which also gives the album its name. Using a blend of new and old instruments, the piece is subdued and orchestrated, with strong elements of minimalist and chamber music.

The extended line-up premiered the album at Hammersmith's Riverside Studios in October 1984 before playing at Wilson's nightclub The Hacienda and the Institute of Contemporary Arts. The album sleeve, designed by 8vo and featuring Henri Matisse's Trivaux Pond painting glued onto card, has been cited as innovative. Upon its release, the album reached number 8 on the UK Indie Albums Chart and also found success in Japan. Critics have been generally favourable, generally complimenting the piece's peaceful nature and seeing it as a progression in the band's sound, though some contemporary and retrospectives have more mixed opinions, and Reilly has disowned the album. The album has been re-released several times.

== Background ==
Although the Manchester-based Durutti Column's third album, Another Setting (1983), moved the band away from its post-punk-derived dream pop sound and into a somewhat chamber music-derived style, Durutti Column leader Vini Reilly, alongside Tony Wilson, the head of the band's label Factory Records, were displeased with the record, with Wilson especially finding it too similar to the band's previous album LC (1981). He recalled: "Another Setting trod the same ground as L.C. and took nothing forward. It was time for a change." The group subsequently recorded a new album, Short Stories for Pauline, in Brussels in early 1983, a largely instrumental album, while touring Belgium with poet Anne Clark.

However, with Wilson being displeased with Short Stories for Pauline, the album went unreleased for many decades until LTM Recordings released it in 2011, highlighting the deteriorating relationship between Reilly and Wilson. Nonetheless, one track from the album, a "superlative instrumental for piano and violin" entitled "Little Mercy," also known as "Duet" or "La Douleur", in which Reilly was accompanied by violinist Blaine L. Reininger of Tuxedomoon, caught Wilson's attention in particular. With the Pauline album shelved, Wilson asked that Reilly develop and expand "Little Mercy" into a full album, complete with orchestration, pushing Reilly and the Durutti Column into modern classical composition, resulting in the conceiving of Without Mercy. In the words of Factory biographer James Nice, "Tony Wilson hoped that Vini Reilly might yet become Bohuslav Martinu or Philip Glass."

Wilson credits Factory Records for conceiving the album and the line-up of "musicians for Vini to create for", after three classical musicians from Manchester University and the Royal Northern College of Music, including a saxophonist and trumpeter, were curious if Factory had any work for them, and after the label had formed a relationship "with the wonderful Peter Hadfield acting for statuesque cello player, Caroline Lavelle." Factory also contacted Reininger again, who Wilson felt was "always on hand with his Michel Duval impersonations and electrifying violin work." In Wilson's recollection, the first meeting between the extended line-up was at the farm in Cheshire belonging to Factory co-founder Alan Erasmus and his wife, which Erasmus felt "[gets] more people [...] than at the Hacienda."

== Recording ==
The Durutti Column's line-up (at the time consisting of Vini Reilly and percussionist Bruce Mitchell), was temporarily extended for the orchestral Without Mercy, now including Blaine Reininger (violin, viola), Caroline Lavelle (cello), Marvyn Fletcher (saxophone), Tim Kellett (trumpet), Maunagh Fleming (cor anglais and oboe) and Richard Henry (trombone). Reilly played guitar, piano and bass and, in addition to Mitchell, who performed numerous percussive instruments, also programmed Oberheim DMX drum machines on the album. The album was recorded at Strawberry Studios, Stockport, with Wilson co-producing the album – his first production on a Durutti Column album – with Michael Johnson, who also engineered the record. Johnson was best known for typically engineering New Order's records. The album was subsequently mixed at Britannia Row Studios and mastered at CTS Studios.

The recording of Without Mercy was also an attempt on the behalf of Wilson to get Reilly to spend more than only three days in the recording of a Durutti Column album, "to try and slow down the process," thereby "stretching the recording possibilities of the simplistic Durutti Column;" Mick Middles of The Quietus reflected: "Quite why the anti-punk aspects of this exercise didn't dawn on him remains an intriguing question." Without Mercy was subsequently recorded in only five days, which Wilson deemed "an abject failure."

== Music ==
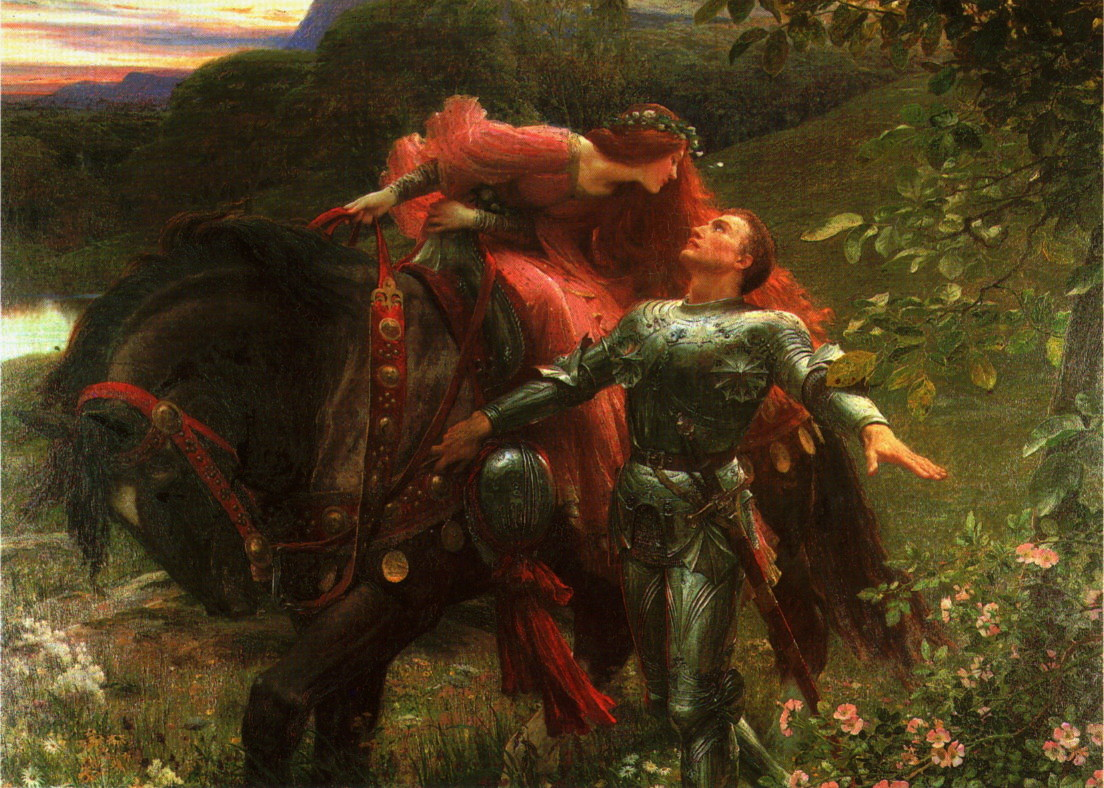
John Keats' poem "La Belle Dame sans Merci" (here illustrated by Frank Dicksee) forms the album's narrative.

Using "Little Mercy" as its foundation, Without Mercy is a two-part, album-length instrumental piece or musical suite, with the first part ("Without Mercy 1") on side one and the second part ("Without Mercy 2") on side two. It expands greatly upon the classical orchestration and accompaniment which were present on Another Setting, especially via the appearance of the numerous additional musicians, and the inclusion of instruments as disperse as trumpet, viola and cor anglais, alongside Mitchell's percussion and Veilly's work on guitar, keyboard and bass, contribute to a blend of new and old instruments. John Keats' ballad poem "La Belle Dame sans Merci" (1819) was used for the album's narrative, which Wilson described as "boy meets girl, boy loses girl and no birds sing." Prendergast described the album as an orchestral "musical setting" for Keats' poem. The name of the poem also gives the album its name.

According to critic Ned Raggett, "reflection and subdued but not inactive performing are the key", even during the album's busiest moments, with many points of the album being somewhat reminiscent of Erik Satie, while "Reilly is almost always, either via keyboards or his guitar, front and center." Reinginer's violin and viola and Lavelle's cello are said to add "even more classical atmosphere" to the album. The album is delicate, and often particularly minimalist in nature. Peter Mills of Rough Guides compared Without Mercy to Mike Oldfield's Tubular Bells. Critics regard the record as a delve into modern classical and chamber music.

The entire composition is "underpinned by a recurrent, mournful piano riff, plaintive violin and stirring brass." "Without Mercy 1" begins with Reilly's melancholic piano, followed by oboe from Manaugh Fleming and trumpet from Tim Kellet alongside Reilly's guitar, "adding in here and there as needed while the track unfolds further to [a] Reilly guitar solo." Trouser Press felt it was "like modern chamber music, an ambitious and shifting mixture of piano, horns, strings and electronic percussion." An entire studio group is used on "Without Mercy 2," which favours guitar. Blaine Reininger reprises his role as violinist from "Little Mercy". Roughly eight minutes into the second side, "funky horns and beats" start to appear.

== Release ==
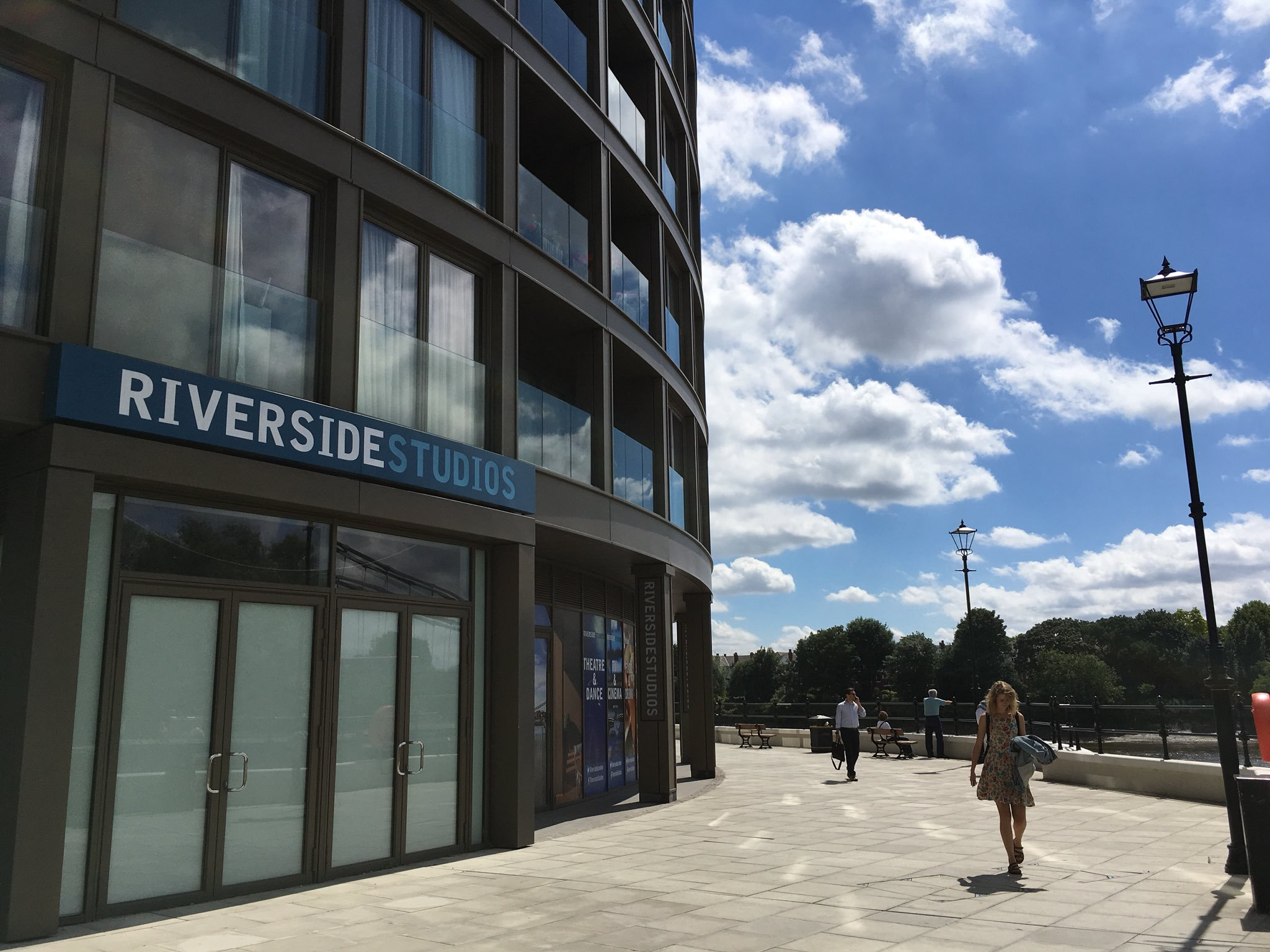
The album was premiered at Hammersmith's Riverside Studios (pictured in 2018).

Without Mercy was released in the United Kingdom by Factory Records in October 1984 with the catalog number FACT 84, and was also concurrently released in Spain and Italy. It was only the third Factory album to be officially advertised in the music press, via a New Brutalist-styled half-page advert in the NME reading "Durutti Column Piss on The Art of Noise." The album had already been premiered live in August 1984 at London's Riverside Studios with the nine-piece "orchestra," followed by further performances at Wilson's Manchester nightclub The Hacienda on 12 December and at the Institute of Contemporary Arts in London shortly after. The band's drummer Bruce Mitchell later contended that "Without Mercy demonstrated Tony's flair for marketing and PR. It definitely changed perceptions of Vini as a composing musician, so it was an accurate reading of the media. But Vini had to be forced to do it."

The album sleeve, described by Nice as a "genuinely classic sleeve," was the first project completed by typographically led design studio 8vo, a collaboration between Mark Holt and Simon Johnston that had been approached after Factory's in-house designer Peter Saville "made little progress on his first Durutti sleeve," and the success of the Without Mercy sleeve meant that 8vo became Durutti's sleeve designers of choice thereafter. It features Henri Matisse's scenic painting Trivaux Pond (1916–17) glued onto recycled pulp board, alongside letterpress-printed type "reminiscent of the flowing poetry of Guillaume Apollinaire," with both the flow and the font on the sleeve chosen to reflect the Post-Impressionist period of Matisse's painting. With the painting being physically glued onto the sleeve, it was cited as an innovative sleeve by Prendergast.

== Reception and legacy ==
Professional ratings
Review scores
Source	Rating
AllMusic	3/5 stars
Martin C. Strong	7/10
Trouser Press	(favourable)

Without Mercy was a relative commercial success, reaching number 8 on the UK Independent Albums Chart, and also bringing the band strong success in Japan, where the group would record the CD-only live album Domo Arigato the following year. Without Mercy also received positive reviews from contemporary critics, though, with Reilly moving in an increasingly less "rock" direction, they struggled to find suitable frames of reference, with reviewer Martin Aston calling it "a source of fragility that approaches the minimal mastery of Eno or even Erik Satie, employing both the drifting dream states of the former and the frozen delicacy of the latter." Aston was favourable towards the record, saying "Reilly, single-handedly, could alter the meaning of easy listening, and with this in mind, it's about time that this strain of musical input found a more comfortable home than that of the elite and esoteric."

Although unsure of the album's second side, Sounds called the album "beautiful without being cloying" and "quietly impressive." Steph Paynes of the NME were more reserved, saying the album was "one good idea stretched to album length": "The tune eventually evolves into variations of itself. But it does so without a clear direction and without much adventure. Some of the gestures work nicely; others are inappropriate, inserted for the sake of change." Band biographer James Nice later reflected: "'Duet' says everything it needs to say in two and a half minutes. Stretched across the entire Without Mercy album, more became less." Other retrospective reviews have been favourbale, with Ned Raggett of AllMusic saying: "It's very self-consciously romantic (track and album are in fact named for Keats' noted poem La Belle Dame Sans Merci), but the combination of new and old instruments, plus the continuation of the unique Durutti sheen and shine in the recording quality, results in quietly touching heights."

As with many other Durutti Column LPs, Reilly dislikes the album, once telling a writer for The Quietus that he jokingly calls it "Without Merit," and reflecting: "Without Mercy is a joke. [...] It was all Tony Wilson's idea to make it more classical. He had aspirations that I should be taken more seriously. That never interested me. Everyone's obsessed with form. 'Is it avant-garde? Is it jazz?' It's just tunes." He elaborated: "That album was Tony Wilson saying to me, ‘You've done so many albums the way you wanted to do them, and when you wanted to do them, so just this once make this my record and do it my way.' He's one of my best friends, so of course I said yeah. And that's Without Mercy. There were all these studio classical musicians involved. For me it doesn't actually work. It was more of a learning process really."

=== Reissues ===
In March 1988, Without Mercy was re-issued on as part of Durutti Column – The First Four Albums, a four-CD box set that remastered the album, alongside its predecessors in the band's discography, in full digital stereo. London Records re-released the album on CD in 1998, adding the EP Say What You Mean, Mean What You Say (1985), which featured direct excerpts from Without Mercy, as bonus tracks, alongside two stripped-down pieces of the same period, one of which, "All That Love and Maths Can Do", marked the first recorded contribution from violist John Metcalfe on a Durutti Column album.

The 2018 rerelease (Factory Benelux FBN-84) is a four-CD or two-LP edition.

== Track listing ==
All tracks are written by Vini Reilly.

Side one
No.	Title	Length
1.	"Without Mercy 1"	18:49

Side two
No.	Title	Length
1.	"Without Mercy 2"	19:38
Total length:		38:28

== Personnel ==
- The Durutti Column – arrangement
- Vini Reilly – writing, arrangement, guitar, bass, piano, drum programming (DMX)
- Tony Wilson (as Anthony Wilson) – producer, arrangement
- Michael Johnson – producer, engineering
- Blaine L. Reininger – violin, viola
- Tim Kellett – trumpet
- Mel – mastering
- Henri Matisse – cover painting
- Mervyn Fletcher – saxophone
- Richard Henry – trombone
- 8vo – design (typographic design)
- Caroline Lavelle – cello
- Maunagh Fleming – cor anglais, oboe
- Nigel Beverley – engineering assistant
- Tim Dewey – engineering assistant
- Bruce Mitchell – percussion, congas, drum programming (DMX)
