= Obey the Time =

Studio album by the Durutti Column
- Released: December 1990
- Recorded: 1990, Manchester
- Genre: House; alternative dance; downtempo
- Length: 43:55
- Label: Factory
- Producer: Vini Reilly

The Durutti Column chronology
Vini Reilly (1989)	Obey the Time (1990)	Sex and Death (1994)

Obey the Time is the eighth studio album by English band The Durutti Column, released in 1990 by Factory Records. Conceived during the middle of the popularity of acid house in the band's native Manchester, band leader Vini Reilly chose to combine acid house, and other electronic dance music styles, with his signature guitar playing on a new album. He created the album in his home studio with engineer Paul Miller. Drummer Bruce Mitchell only plays on one song, with his slot being filled by drum machines on the remaining tracks. As such, critics have described Obey the Time as a Vini Reilly solo album.

The album was named after a line from William Shakespeare's Othello, which Reilly felt reflected his musical approach on the album. The album's artwork, designed by regular collaborators 8vo, marked a turning point in the band's sleeve designs with its usage of computer design. A remix of "Contra-Indications" by British group Together was released as a single in 1991. Upon its release, Obey the Time received mixed reviews, though retrospective reviews have been positive, with critics complimenting its blend of electronic and rock music. A remastered version was released in 1998. An expanded, remastered double album was released as part of Record Store Day 2019 called 'Obey The Time'/'The Acid Guitar', it was a limited edition of 800 copies on Yellow and Purple vinyl.

== Background and recording ==
After The Durutti Column moved further into embracing contemporary technology on their album Vini Reilly (1989), the group's public profile was relatively quiet for the most part of 1990. They played a short tour of London, Glasgow and their native Manchester in the summer as part of their label Factory Records' newly initiated outlet Factory Classical, while the Manchester-based Granada Television debuted The New, a general arts television series featuring a composition by the band for its theme music. It was in between listening to classical music from composers "ranging from Benjamin Britten to obscure Czech composers" that the Durutti Column leader Vini Reilly began creating the music for Obey the Time, which he conceived to steer the band towards an electronic music direction.

Reilly's ideas for Obey the Time largely stemmed from the popularity of acid house music in England in the late 1980s, especially in his native Manchester. Tony Wilson, the owner of Factory, recalled: "We were in the middle of the Aceeed explosion; if you lived in Manchester, you were absolutely in the middle of it. Vini, like the rest of us, has lost the ability to age or atrophy, and enjoyed the party." Reilly felt that house music had made keyboards "seem so fresh." Wilson reflected that Reilly's reasoning was "something to do with a chord being played with three or four notes into the sampler but then different chords being triggered by a simple key stroke, creating mathematical harmonic relationships 'which Schoenberg had searched for but never found'."

Vini Reilly assembled and recorded the album alone in his home studio using computers, with engineering from Paul Miller. The production of Obey the Time was very new for the band, as the band's drummer Bruce Mitchell only plays on one of the album's tracks ("Art & Freight"), with Reilly instead utilising drum machines on the album's other tracks, with "Contra-Indications" featuring programming and engineering by Andy Robinson at Spirit Studios. Writer Ned Raggett felt this was "partially due to where Reilly's head was at this time around," and given that Reilly worked almost alone on the album, Factory Records biographer James Nice described Obey the Time as "essentially a solo recording by Vini Reilly."

== Composition ==
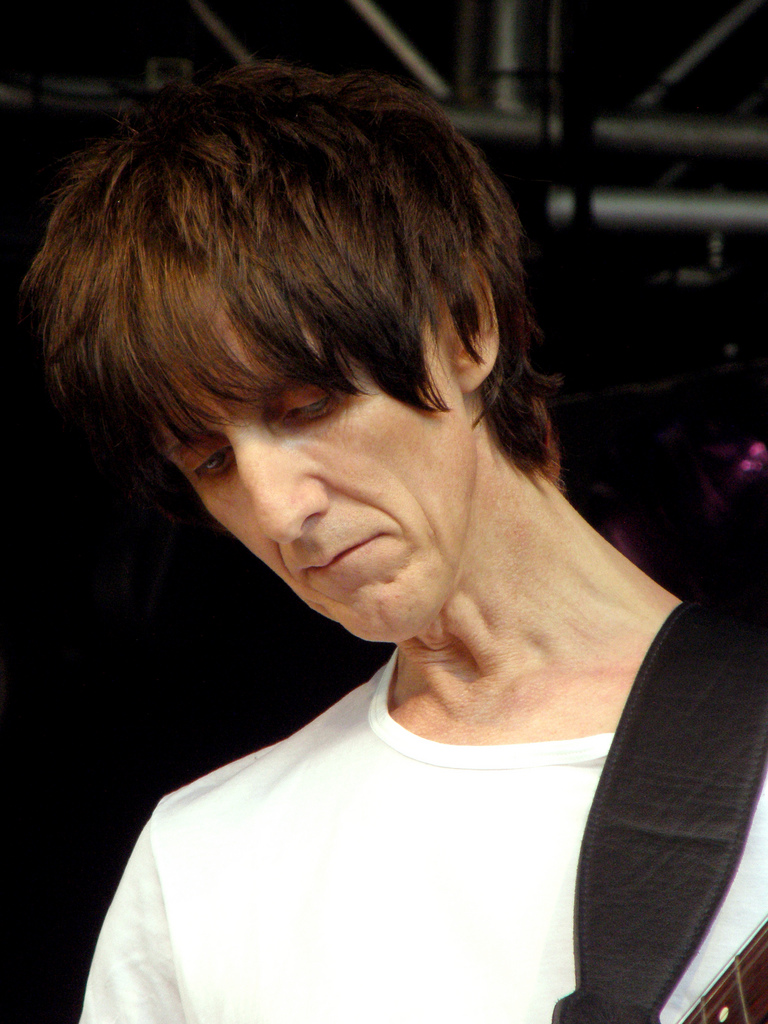
Vini Reilly (pictured in 2007) was inspired by acid house on Obey the Time.

For Obey the Time, Reilly aimed to combine acid house music with his trademark guitar approach. While drawing influence from contemporary dance music styles, in particular the aforementioned late 1980s popularity of acid house in his native Manchester, he also drew inspiration from "dubby world music" and "chilled-out electronica" styles. Characterised by its usage of drum machine, unobtrusive piano and gently reverberated guitars, the album is defined by how its synthesises contemporary styles that "create something distinctly different," according to Ned Raggett of AllMusic. It is more aggressive than previous Reilly albums, with its reliance on constant beats accompanied by "sprinkled" guitar and piano. Writer Martin C. Strong felt the tracks were styled after New Order and exuded a cold feel. One biography felt the album's delve into house music was representative of the musical experimentation that defines the Durutti Column's material.

Many of Reilly's percussion patterns on the album are not specifically acid house rhythms, instead reflecting earlier synth-funk and hard electro sounds, although, according to Raggett, "there's enough of the cusp-of-the-'90s about everything to show he wasn't dating himself." The keyboard stabs on some tracks feature the "stuttering, choppy melodies" of techno music, while, according to Raggett, "Reilly's own knack for what suits a song best means sometimes it's more gentle acoustica and other times full-on electric shimmer and drive." The album is also atypical to other Durutti Column albums in that it features very few guitar parts. Tracks such as "Hotel of the Lake 1990", "Fridays", "Spanish Reggae" and "Contra-indications" are defined by the shimmering "nightmarish neon noodles" and stuttering staccatos.

Obey the Time is bookended by two acoustic tracks atypical of the album's aggressive sound, "Vino Della Casa Bianco" and "Vina Della Casa Rosso", described by writer Paul Pledger as "opening and closing vignettes," which show a warmer, "more personal side" to Reilley's oeuvre, as does "Home". "Hotel of the Lake, 1990" features funk-styled guitar and bass work, "whooshing" minimal synthesiser loops and a steady beat, laden with a reoccurring "classically Durutti five-note guitar melody with deep echo." "Fridays" incorporates elements of flamenco music, while its keyboard stabs feature the choppy, stuttering melodies favoured by techno music. Both "Fridays" and the "gently dramatic" track "The Warmest Rain" are sparse and minimal. The subtle "Spanish Reggae", whose title was described by Ned Raggett as "both accurate and not a nightmare", incorporates a slow but menacing contemporary dancehall rhythm, with subtle flamenco snippets and Reilley's electric guitar playing processed through heavy dub echo. "Contra-indications" is a pure house music piece, displaying an explicit influence from the Durutti Column's labelamates the Happy Mondays and New Order.

== Title and packaging ==
Obey the Time is named after a phrase used by the titular character of William Shakespeare's Othello to his fiancée, Desdemona, in Act One, Scene Two: "I have but an hour of love, of worldly matters and direction, To spend with thee: we must obey the time." Reilly heard the line in a TV adaptation and used it because he felt it "captured exactly the feel of the work in progress," due to the album's acid house influence being a concession to contemporary music. Wilson later said: "In experimenting with certain beats and ideas, Vini was indeed obeying the time."

The Mark Holt-headed design agency 8vo designed the album's packaging, as they had for all Durutti Column albums since 1984. They used the Helvetica Black typeface on the packaging and the related "Vini Reilly - Genius" promotional poster, both of which were designed with Macintosh computers. While Holt admitted that neither the album packaging nor the poster would have looked the same had they not used computers, they were a case of the agency "[being in] control of the design and not the software dictating terms. The use of layering develops an already established 8vo approach." He felt that the sleeve and poster were "defining works" for 8vo, finding them to represent the point in which the agency discovered how they could "best use the computer to suit our working methods as a tool to supplement and enhance the possibilities of experimentation and design development."

== Release and reception ==
Professional ratings
Review scores
Source	Rating
AllMusic	2/5 stars
The Encyclopedia of Popular Music	3/5 stars
The Great Rock Discography	6/10
Select	2/5 stars

Obey the Time was released by Factory Records in December 1990. Unlike previous Durutti Column albums, it failed to chart on the UK Independent Albums Chart. In February 1991, Factory released "The Together Mix", a remix of "Contra-Indications" by rave group Together, as a limited edition twelve-inch single, which also contained another remix of "Contra-Indictions" and an "Up-Person Remix" of "Fridays". It received mute acclaim from music critics. In partial promotion of the album, The Durutti Column also played in Paris and London that month, with the latter gig featuring Reilly, Mitchell, Miller and a Chinese lute player performing several songs from Obey the Time among other releases.

In a contemporary review for Select, Graham Linehan mockingly described Obey the Time as "music for films that will never be made" and "New Age for those who feel safer having the name of the band on the sleeve rather than the composer." He felt the "near-comatose" album nonetheless provided several highlights, such as "Fridays", "Vino Della Cassa Bianco" and "Neon", the latter of which he compared to Love Tractor. Factory Records biographer James Nice later reflected the album "failed to repeat the artistic success" of The Guitar and Other Machines and Vini Reilly.

Despite a rating of two stars out of five, Ned Raggett of AllMusic was very positive in a retrospective review, calling it "another fine Durutti release," and noting: "Where in nearly any other hands this would have been a pathetic crossover disaster waiting to happen, the end results are gratifyingly like what his compatriots in New Order did the previous year with Technique, synthesizing up-to-date styles to create something distinctly different". In The Great Rock Discography, writer Martin C. Strong described Obey the Time as "[h]ypnotic and holiday-esque (as if basking on a beach in ear-shot of an acid-house disco)". He felt that the album's "cold, synthetic New Order-styled rpm's" lacked "any cohesion or formula", and rated it 6 out of 10. Colin Larkin rated the album three stars out of five in The Encyclopedia of Popular Music. After some time, Reilly was reported to have forgotten the album, although Robert Jarrell speculated that Reilly, who has a noted dislike for his band's material, was instead choosing to overlook "the disappointment" of the album.

=== Remastered version ===
In October 1998, as part of the "Factory Once" series of Durutti Column remasters, London Records released a remastered version of Obey the Time. As bonus tracks, it features "The Together Mix" and the "Up-Person Remix" of "Fridays", as well as, in an unusual "discography switcheroo", "Kiss of Def," a moody jungle remix of "My Last Kiss" from Reilly's 1998 album Time Was...Gigantic, named for a line from New Order's "The Perfect Kiss". Wilson explained in the liner notes that the anachronistic inclusion of "Kiss of Def" as a bonus track was because he and London Records "submit it as a most recent example of Vini 'obeying' the time and as such connecting to the music of [the Obey the Time period] and taking us up to where the ripples of '88 still make interesting patterns on the shore". The remix was created by Kier, the producer of the Time Was...Gigantic, and Wilson described it as "sorta post-trance, sub-jungle, retro-ambient or something".

== Track listing ==
All songs written by Vini Reilly

1. "Vino Della Casa Bianco" – 1:02
2. "Hotel of the Lake 1990" – 5:16
3. "Fridays" – 4:10
4. "Home" – 5:39
5. "Art and Freight" – 3:32
6. "Spanish Reggae" – 4:58
7. "Neon" – 6:30
8. "The Warmest Rain" – 6:51
9. "Contra-Indications" – 4:11
10. "Vino Della Casa Rosso" – 1:35

== Personnel ==
- Vini Reilly – writing
- Paul Miller – programming (all tracks except 9), engineering (all tracks except 9)
- Andy Robinson – programming (track 9), engineering (track 9)
- Bruce Mitchell – drums (track 5)
- 8vo – graphic design
