= The Guitar and Other Machines =

Studio album by the Durutti Column
- Released: 5 December 1987
- Genre: Electronic; indie rock; ambient
- Length: 40:01
- Label: Factory
- Producer: Stephen Street

The Durutti Column chronology
Circuses and Bread (1986)	The Guitar and Other Machines (1987)	Vini Reilly (1989)

The Guitar and Other Machines is the sixth album by English post-punk band The Durutti Column, released on 5 December 1987. It was re-released on 12 January 2018, featuring two bonus discs. The album marked a stylistic shift for the band, being led by a drum machine and synthesisers.

== Background ==
The album originated when Factory Records (to which the band was signed) manager Tony Wilson gifted frontman Vini Reilly several electronic instruments, with instruments making it onto the album including a Yamaha Sequencer and a DMX Drum Machine. As such, the album marked a stylistic shift for the band. It featured long-running collaborator drummer Bruce Mitchell and John Metcalfe on viola.

To produce the album, Stephen Street was recruited; he also played the bass on "English Landscape Tradition". Street later paved the way for Reilly's role playing guitar on Morrissey's debut solo album Viva Hate. Guest vocals were contributed by Miranda Stanton of Thick Pigeon and Reilly's then-partner Pol.

== Release ==
The album received Factory number FAC 204, and was the first ever commercial release on Digital Audio Tape. It was re-released on 12 January 2018, along with two bonus discs: one featured associated studio records, while the other included a live show recording from New York's Bottom Line Club, and two tracks recorded at WOMAD.

== Critical reception ==
Professional ratings
Review scores
Source	Rating
Uncut	3.5/5 stars
AllMusic	3/5 stars
Record Collector	4/5 stars
PEEK-A-BOO	9/10 stars

The album was received positively. Tim Peacock of Record Collector magazine noted that some tracks were "nigh-on destroyed by juddering sequencers", despite the drum machine used having been "cutting edge at the time", and describing it as "telling" that the album's "best tracks" were "unadorned outings" featuring solely Reilly's guitar. However, he praised the 2018 reissue for the content of its two bonus discs.

Paul Pledger, writing for PEEK-A-BOO, noted "LFO MOD" as one of the band's "finest moments", calling the album itself "poignant". Ian Canty of Louder Than War stated that the album was "fondly remembered" by fans of the band; and particularly noted that the presence of female vocals helped make the tracks on which they were featured "diverting, dream-Pop beauties".

== Track listing ==
All tracks are written by Vini Reilly.

The Guitar and Other Machines
No.	Title	Length
1.	"Arpeggiator"	4:03
2.	"What Is It To Me (Woman)"	3:47
3.	"Red Shoes"	3:13
4.	"Jongleur Grey"	2:41
5.	"When The World"	3:13
6.	"U.S.P."	2:22
7.	"Bordeaux Sequence"	5:50
8.	"Pol In B"	3:08
9.	"English Landscape Tradition"	4:48
10.	"Miss Haymes"	5:14
11.	"Don't Think You're Funny"	1:42
Total length:		40:01

== Charts ==
Chart performance for The Guitar and Other Machines
Chart (2018)	Peak position
UK Independent Albums (Official Charts)	48
UK Independent Album Breakers (OCC)	9
