= Another Setting =

Studio album by the Durutti Column
- Released: August 1983
- Recorded: December 1982
- Studio: Strawberry, Stockport
- Genre: Post-punk, dream pop
- Label: Factory
- Producer: Chris Nagle, Vini Reilly

The Durutti Column chronology
LC (1981)	Another Setting (1983)	Without Mercy (1984)

Professional ratings
Review scores
Source	Rating
AllMusic	3/5 stars

Another Setting is the third studio album by English band the Durutti Column, released in August 1983. In 1989, primary Depeche Mode songwriter Martin L. Gore released a cover of "Smile in the Crowd" on his first solo release, Counterfeit EP.

== Track listing ==
All music written by Vini Reilly.

A1. "Prayer" - 3:09
A2. "Response" - 3:16
A3. "Bordeaux" - 2:13
A4. "For a Western" - 2:26
A5. "The Beggar" - 2:06
A6. "Francesca" - 3:37
B1. "Smile in the Crowd" - 3:45
B2. "You've Heard It Before" - 3:33
B3. "Dream of a Child" - 2:56
B4. "Second Family" - 3:26
B5. "Spent Time" - 2:44

2015 Factory Benelux reissue (FBN-30-CD):

1. "Prayer"
2. "Response"
3. "Bordeaux"
4. "For a Western"
5. "The Beggar"
6. "Francesca"
7. "Smile in the Crowd"
8. "You've Heard It Before"
9. "Dream of a Child"
10. "Second Family"
11. "Spent Time"
12. "I Get Along Without You Very Well"
13. "Love Fading"
14. "For Noriko"
15. "Bordeaux" (live at WOMAD)
16. "The Beggar" (live at La Cigale)
17. "Piece for Out of Tune Grande Piano"

2018, April 21 Factory Benelux Record Store Day reissue (FBN 30 limited edition of 800 copies includes exclusive live disc in clear vinyl):

A1. "Prayer"
A2. "Response"
A3. "Bordeaux"
A4. "For a Western"
A5. "The Beggar"
A6. "Francesca"
B1. "Smile in the Crowd"
B2. "You've Heard It Before"
B3. "Dream of a Child"
B4. "Second Family"
B5. "Spent Time"
C1. "Sketch for Dawn" (live)
C2. "Sketch for Summer" (live)
C3. "Conduct" (live)
C4. "Pauline" (live)
C5. "Jacqueline" (live)
D1. "Stains" (live)
D2. "Estoril a Noite" (live)
D3. "The Beggar" (live)
D4. "I Get Along Without You Very Well"

The core album on disc 1 and a previously unreleased live performance from Pandora's Box Festival in Rotterdam (2 September 1983) on disc 2. The gatefold sleeve is printed on white matt board. Includes a download code for a digital copy of the vinyl tracks.

== Personnel ==
The Durutti Column

- Vini Reilly – instruments

with:

- Bruce Mitchell - percussion
- Simon Topping - trumpet
- Maunagh Fleming - cor anglais

Technical

- Mark Farrow - graphic design
- Jackie Williams - paintings, artwork
- Ged Murray - photography
