= Toby Toman =

British drummer

- Also known as: Toby, Toby Toman
- Born: Philip Toman; Wythenshawe, Manchester, England
- Genres: Alternative rock, new wave, post-punk
- Occupation: Musician
- Instrument: Drums
- Years active: 1970s–present

Philip Toman, known professionally as Toby Toman, is a drummer who played with various British bands including the Nosebleeds, Ludus, the Durutti Column, Blue Orchids, and Primal Scream, working often with German singer Nico, known for her role with the Velvet Underground, while she was living in Manchester, England, through the 1980s.

== Biography ==
Toman was born Philip Toman in Wythenshawe, Manchester, one of four brothers. There he attended school with Ed Garrity and Pete Crooks, with whom he shared musical interests. These three formed Wild Ram, which evolved into Ed Banger and the Nosebleeds, shortly after guitarist Vini Reilly joined. Although known in the Manchester area, they only released one single "Ain't Bin to No Music School", in 1977. After the release of the single, Garrity and Reilly left the band, being replaced by Morrissey (later the Smiths singer and successful solo artist) and Billy Duffy (later of the Cult). The new band split up shortly afterward.

After the Nosebleeds dissolved, Toman joined Ludus, led by singer and design artist Linder Sterling. By 1980, Toman was working again with his former Nosebleeds bandmates Pete Crooks and Vini Reilly in the Durutti Column, a band led by Reilly, releasing their debut album, The Return of the Durutti Column. Shortly thereafter, he left the Durutti Column and Ludus, worked briefly with the Invisible Girls, then worked in the backing bands for John Cooper Clarke, Pauline Murray and Nico, playing drums on Nico's single "Procession". He worked for more than five years on subsequent Nico discs, including the ones which the latter made with Blue Orchids as backing band; Toman joined that group by the time.

During the late 1980s and early 1990s, Toman played with Primal Scream, notably on their most successful albums, Screamadelica and Give Out But Don't Give Up.
