= A Paean to Wilson =

Studio album by the Durutti Column
- Released: 25 January 2010
- Studio: Inch Studio Manchester
- Genres: Ambient; indie rock; neoclassical
- Length: 100:50
- Label: Kooky Records
- Producer: Bruce Mitchell

The Durutti Column chronology
| Love in the Time of Recession (2009) | A Paean to Wilson (2010) | Chronicle (2011) |

A Paean to Wilson is the 26th studio album by English band The Durutti Column. It was released in January 2010, through Kooky Records. Its title refers to Tony Wilson, the co-founder and owner of Factory Records, who was a personal friend of Vini Reilly, and had died three years prior to its release. Reilly had been at the hospital the day Wilson died. The second CD (Heaven Sent), had previously been released on F4 Records, another of Wilson's record labels, in March 2004.

== Critical reception ==
Professional ratings
Review scores
| Source | Rating |
|---|---|
| AllMusic | 4/5 stars |
| Clash | 8/10 |
| Drowned in Sound | 8/10 |
| Record Collector | 4/5 stars |

The album was positively received, and noted as a return to form, and as the band's best album in 20 years. It was noted that Reilly's choice not to sing in any of the songs may have been a deliberate choice to honour Wilson, who had long urged Reilly to not include his vocals and allow his guitar to sing for him.

== Track listing ==
All tracks are written by Vini Reilly, Keir Stewart, and Bruce Mitchell.

A Paean to Wilson (CD1)
| No. | Title | Length |
|---|---|---|
| 1. | "Or Are You Just A Technician" | 0:57 |
| 2. | "Chant" | 10:34 |
| 3. | "Quatro" | 3:21 |
| 4. | "Requiem" | 8:07 |
| 5. | "Stuki" | 7:11 |
| 6. | "Along Came Poppy" | 4:20 |
| 7. | "Brother" | 8:36 |
| 8. | "Duet With Piano" | 3:17 |
| 9. | "Darkness Here" | 2:29 |
| 10. | "Catos Revisited" | 8:24 |
| 11. | "The Truth" | 4:12 |
| 12. | "How Unbelievable" | 11:40 |

Heaven Sent (It was called digital. It was Heaven sent) (CD2)
| No. | Title | Length |
|---|---|---|
| 1. | "Bruce" | 4:55 |
| 2. | "Keir" | 4:19 |
| 3. | "Neil" | 4:31 |
| 4. | "Mike" | 5:05 |
| 5. | "Alan" | 5:01 |
| 6. | "Anthony" | 3:51 |
| Total length: | | 100:50 (total) |
