= Circuses and Bread =

Studio album by the Durutti Column
- Released: April 1986
- Recorded: 1986
- Studios: Strawberry Studios; Revolution Studios
- Genres: Ambient; art rock; neoclassical
- Length: 48:24
- Label: Factory
- Producer: Vini Reilly

The Durutti Column chronology
Without Mercy (1984)	Circuses and Bread (1986)	The Guitar and Other Machines (1987)

Circuses and Bread is the fifth studio album by English post-punk band The Durutti Column. It was released in April 1986, through Factory.

== Background ==
The album saw Vini Reilly and Bruce Mitchell joined by John Metcalfe and Tim Kellett, making the band a quartet. Reilly's usual guitar was joined by various other instruments, such as viola, piano, and horns, as well as vocals; the track Royal Infirmary is a piano track featuring automatic rifle fire sounds. Tomorrow was released as a single in Belgium by Factory Benelux.

== Critical reception ==
Professional ratings
Review scores
Source	Rating
AllMusic	3/5 stars
Record Collector	4/5 stars

The album received generally positive reviews. Reilly's singing on several tracks was described as regrettable by Trouser Press, while Michael Edwards, writing for Exclaim! characterised the album as covering a lot of ground, with "intricately orchestrated instrumentals" as well as "delicate songs".

Reviewing the accompanying single "Tomorrow" in May 1986, NME wrote that it "weaves itself around the mind, slips in and out of the heart, and still has a sliver of edge to it that never really makes it 'easy' to listen to". Trouser Press singled out two tracks as groundbreaking: "For Hilary", which it called "the loudest, most aggressive thing he has ever recorded", and "Royal Infirmary", a piano piece that "has no guitar at all". Reviewing LTM's 2008 reissue, Record Collector described Reilly's attempts to break away from his trademark delicacy as "little short of thrilling", and Edwards suggested that the album's more abstract tracks "must have been a huge influence on Disco Inferno and Bark Psychosis".

== Track listing ==
All tracks are written by Vini Reilly.

Circuses and Bread
No.	Title	Length
1.	"For Pauline"	2:42
2.	"Tomorrow"	4:03
3.	"Dance II"	5:37
4.	"For Hilary"	3:13
5.	"Street Fight"	4:02
6.	"Royal Infirmary"	4:19
7.	"Black Horses"	8:36
8.	"Dance I"	5:01
9.	"Blind Elevator Girl - Osaka"	10:17
Total length:		48:24

All tracks are written by Vini Reilly.

Circuses and Bread (2021 Vinyl)
No.	Title	Length
10.	"The Aftermath"	4:26
11.	"Our Lady Of The Angels (Stu 'Jammer' James Mix)"	5:09
12.	"Florence Sunset"	5:09
13.	"All That Love And Maths Can Do"	3:43
14.	"San Giovanni Dawn"	4:02
15.	"For Friends In Italy"	4:44
