= The Return of the Durutti Column =

- Original sandpaper sleeve by Tony Wilson

Studio album by the Durutti Column
- Released: January 1980
- Recorded: August 1979
- Studios: Cargo, Rochdale, England
- Genres: Ambient; dream pop; post-punk
- Length: 28:13
- Label: Factory
- Producer: Martin Hannett

The Durutti Column chronology
The Return of the Durutti Column (1980)	LC (1981)

Alternative cover
- Second edition sleeve by Steve Horsfall

The Return of the Durutti Column is the debut studio album by English band The Durutti Column. It was released in January 1980 through record label Factory.

== Background ==
The album was a collaboration between producer Martin Hannett and Vini Reilly. Hannett experimented with electronic sounds in the studio, creating the backing tracks to which Reilly's classical influenced guitar playing was added. The album was given the Factory Identifier FACT14 (Vinyl), or FACT14-C (Cassette).

The original 2000 LP sleeves were made of coarse sandpaper (an homage to the Situationist book Mémoires (1959) that similarly had a sandpaper cover) designed by Dave Rowbotham and Tony Wilson. The sleeves were assembled by members of the band and label-mates Joy Division. The initial two thousand copies also included a flexi-disc single with two tracks by producer Martin Hannett: "First Aspect of the Same Thing" and "Second Aspect of the Same Thing".

A regular printed sleeve for later copies was designed by Steve Horsfall featuring paintings by Raoul Dufy in varying textured and non-textured sleeves. This release includes an additional mix of the album with less reverb and more phasing.

"Sketch for Summer"/"Sketch for Winter" was released as a single (Gap Records SFA-491) in Australia, with a sleeve by Andrew Penhallow of Gap.

In 2013, a modified version was issued as a vinyl album by Factory Benelux (FBN-114) with an 11-inch square sheet of coarse glasspaper attached to the inner sleeve, visible through a die-cut in the front cover. The die-cut was based on the 1978 Factory 'bar graph' logo designed by Peter Saville. On this edition, the Hannett tracks were included on a bonus 7-inch single on hard vinyl.

The album was given a 2025 reissue, remastered from the original source tapes and featuring several demo tracks.

== Critical reception ==
Professional ratings
Review scores
Source	Rating
AllMusic	4.5/5 stars
The Guardian	5/5 stars
Pitchfork	8.5/10
PopMatters	8/10
Record Collector	5/5 stars

AllMusic called the album a "quietly stunning debut, as influential down the road as his labelmates in Joy Division's effort with Unknown Pleasures."

Reviewing the 2013 reissue, Record Collector's Ian Shirley called it "arguably the most distinctive record in the Factory canon" and deemed it "a classic album".

== Track listing ==
All tracks written by Vini Reilly

Side A

1. "Sketch for Summer" - 2:58
2. "Requiem for a Father" - 5:06
3. "Katharine" - 5:26
4. "Conduct" - 4:59

Side B

1. "Beginning" - 1:37
2. "Jazz" - 1:35
3. "Sketch for Winter" - 2:22
4. "Collette" - 2:20
5. "In 'D'" - 2:25

Bonus flexi-disc

1. "First Aspect of the Same Thing" - 3:42
2. "Second Aspect of the Same Thing" - 2:59

== Personnel ==
The Durutti Column

- Vini Reilly – guitar
- Pete Crooks – bass guitar
- Toby Toman (credited as Toby) – drums

Additional personnel

- Martin Hannett – production
- Chris Nagle – engineering
- John Brierley – engineering
- Anthony H. Wilson – sleeve artwork (uncredited)

== Charts ==
Chart performance for The Return of the Durutti Column
Chart (2025)	Peak position
Scottish Albums (Official Charts)	53
UK Albums Sales (OCC)	36
UK Independent Albums (Official Charts)	8
