= William Self =

William Self may refer to:

- Will Self (born 1961), English novelist
- William Self (organist) (1906–1998), American organist and choirmaster
- William Edwin Self, American actor and producer
- William Lee Self, American musician and composer
- Bill Self (born 1962), American basketball coach
