= Montanablue =

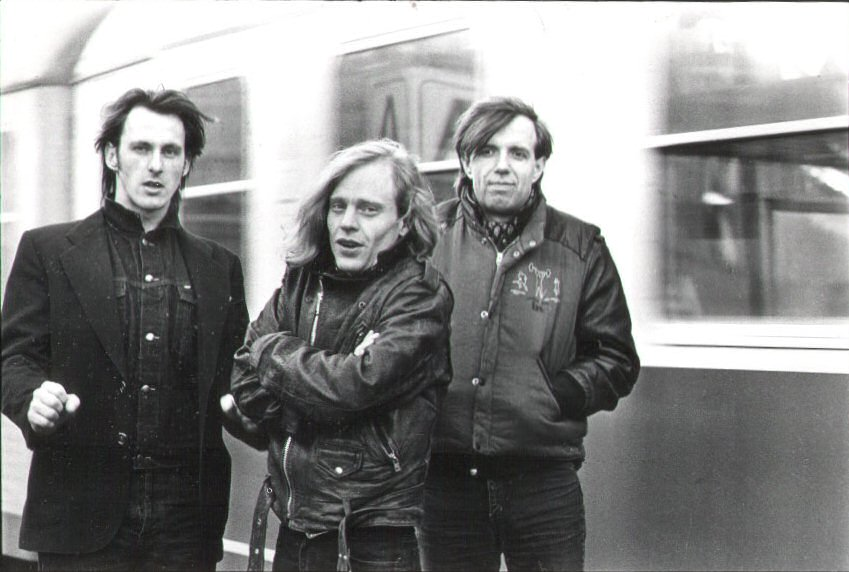

Background information
- Origin: Cologne, Germany
- Genres: Alternative rock, new wave
- Years active: 1985–1991
- Labels: WEA, Pinpoint Records, BMG
- Past members: William Lee Self; Leon Kieven; Jiri Douda; Jürgen Dahmen; Stephan Rath
- Website: www.myspace.com/montanablueband/

Montanablue was a rock band formed in 1985 in Cologne, Germany by Leon Kieven (Bass), Jiri Douda (Drums) and William Lee Self (guitar, vocals).

== History ==
Montanablue recorded an EP of material with Rainer Assman meant for release on Normal records until the German television producer and music publisher Harold Goldbach heard the recordings and promised the band he could secure them a major label contract. After an appearance on the German Musik Convoy television show (a first for an unsigned act) and an opening slot on John Cale's 1985 German tour the band were signed to WEA and almost immediately began recording their debut album with renowned German producer Conny Plank. The resulting "Compliments and Roses" album was released in Europe and received fantastic reviews making Montanablue a critic's favorite in Germany and Benelux. The album includes contributions from Blaine L. Reininger and from Jürgen Dahmen who would become the bands permanent keyboardist. David Hudson produced a video for the "What She Needs" EP/single. Unfortunately being the critic's darlings did not translate into the kind of sales WEA had imagined and after releasing 2 more EP's on WEA and most importantly after the death of Conny Plank in 1987 the band lost any leverage it may have had and were dropped by WEA and Harold Goldbach. The band felt relieved, after having been burdened with such expectations from the outset and began work on a new album with German producer and musician Arno Steffen. After entering into a licensing agreement with Pinpoint Records and signing with the publisher Kick the band released their second full studio album "Chained To An Elephant". Once again the album and its singles (including "Zeb And LuLu" (a song Reininger penned especially for the band) received great reviews and airplay, but sales remained sluggish. Pinpoint released a live album titled "A Showcase Of Manly Delights" recorded by Thomas Stern (Einstürzende Neubauten, Nick Cave) from the band's 1989 tour with Blaine Reininger. Montanablue and Reininger toured together during this period, incorporating Reiningers material into their own set. These shows were very successful and the 500-1000 seat venues were inevitably sold out. The band parted ways with Pinpoint and were picked up by Choldwig Musik/BMG for what was to be their final LP "We Always Are Where We Go" recorded at the Conny Plank studio by Thomas Stern and Ingo Kraus, released in 1991. The band dissolved shortly thereafter.

== Discography ==
- We always are where we go (BMG, 1991)
- Short Tempers (BMG, 1990)
- Showcase of manly delights (Pinpoint Records, 1989)
- Foolish Man (Pinpoint Records, 1988)
- Zeb & Lulu (Pinpoint Records, 1988)
- Chained to an elephant (Pinpoint Records, 1988)
- What she needs (WEA, 1987)
- Look after me (WEA, 1986)
- Compliments & Roses (WEA, 1986)
- Waiting (by the walk) (WEA, 1985)

== List of TV Show appearances ==
- Level 43 (RTL)
- Doktor Mambo (ARD)
- Musik Convoy (SWF)
- WDR Rocknacht Live (WDR)
- Formel Eins (ARD)
- Aktuelle Stunde Köln (WDR)
- Aktuelle Stunde Dusseldorf (WDR)
- TELE 5
- MTV Germany
- Viva
