= Time Was Gigantic... When We Were Kids =

Studio album by the Durutti Column
- Released: 3 November 1998
- Genres: Indie rock; ambient
- Length: 58:30
- Labels: Factory Too, London
- Producer: Kier Stewart

The Durutti Column chronology
Fidelity (1996)	Time Was Gigantic... When We Were Kids (1998)	Rebellion (2001)

Time Was Gigantic... When We Were Kids is a studio album by English post-punk band The Durutti Column, released on 3 November 1998. The album was re-released in June 2023 to mark 25 years since its original release, with a visualiser for "Pigeon" being produced.

== Background ==
Vini Reilly, the band's frontman, described himself as formerly being a "control freak" in the recording studio, but relinquished some control in the recording of the album, such as with Kier Stewart serving as producer. Reilly also largely relinquished vocal duties, the album instead featuring vocals from singer Eley Rudge on six of its tracks; she had previously appeared on two tracks of the band's previous album Fidelity. Reilly himself performed lead vocals on the track "Twenty Trees". The album took elements of folk and jazz, as well as electronics.

It was both the band's final and final ever album released on Factory Records, on the Factory Too imprint ran by London Records.

== Reception ==
Professional ratings
Review scores
Source	Rating
Pitchfork	6.9/10
NME	5/10 stars

Fred Thomas of AllMusic noted the album's "post-classical tones", and its "ethereality", partly due to guest vocals provided by Eley Rudge. Rudge's vocals were also praised on the opening track by Philip Sherburne of Pitchfork, who described the album as a "subtle but unmistakable shift toward pop". However, he noted that Rudge's singing was often "so sweet that it comes off as cloying", and that it didn't entirely suit the "subtleties of Reilly’s playing", also describing the lyrics as gravitating towards "facile sentiments".

Paul Pledger of noted Rudge as providing a relief "amongst the moody darkness", noting that the song Sing To Me could have been a radio hit, but describing several songs as straying, albeit with a "hopeful" closing track. NME noted that Reilly seemed "overly concerned with technique in his search beyond normal musical horizons", and described the album as a "masterpiece of style over content".

== Track listing ==
All tracks are written by Vini Reilly.

The Guitar and Other Machines
No.	Title	Length
1.	"Organ Donor"	6:20
2.	"Pigeon"	3:19
3.	"I B Yours"	4:14
4.	"Twenty Trees"	7:50
5.	"Abuse"	7:55
6.	"Drinking Song"	3:22
7.	"Sing To Me"	7:41
8.	"My Last Kiss"	2:27
9.	"For Rachel"	6:05
10.	"Highfield Choir"	7:32
11.	"Epilogue"	1:41
Total length:		58:30

== Charts ==
Chart performance for Time Was Gigantic... When We Were Kids
Chart (2023)	Peak position
Scottish Albums (Official Charts)	100
UK Album Sales (Official Charts)	88
