= The Durutti Column =

British post-punk band

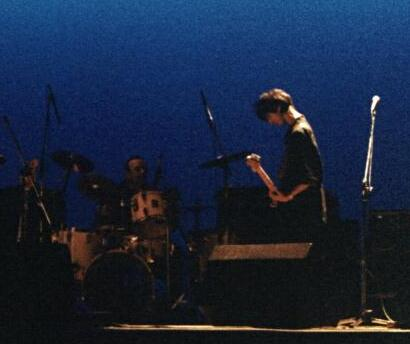
- Vini Reilly (right) and drummer Bruce Mitchell during a 1995 concert

Background information
- Origin: Greater Manchester, England
- Genres: Post-punk; post-rock; dream pop; art rock; neoclassical; chill-out
- Years active: 1978–present
- Labels: Factory, London, Artful, Kookydisc
- Members: Vini Reilly; Bruce Mitchell; Keir Stewart
- Past members: Dave Rowbotham; Chris Joyce; Phil Rainford; Tony Bowers; Toby Toman; Colin Sharp; Tim Kellett; Peter Hook; Martin Jackson; John Metcalfe

The Durutti Column are an English post-punk band formed in 1978 in Manchester, England. The band is the project of guitarist and occasional pianist Vini Reilly, often accompanied by Bruce Mitchell on drums and Keir Stewart on bass, keyboards and harmonica.

The band were among the first acts signed to Factory Records by label founder Tony Wilson. They distinguished themselves from their post-punk contemporaries through Reilly's clean, atmospheric guitar playing and incorporation of jazz, folk, and classical influences. They later incorporated sampling and electronic dance rhythms.

== History ==
=== Early line-ups ===
In 1978, Tony Wilson and Alan Erasmus, later partners in Factory Records, assembled a band around the remnants of local punk rock band Fast Breeder, specifically drummer Chris Joyce and guitarist Dave Rowbotham. The name was derived from a misspelling of the Durruti Column, an anarchist militia unit in the Spanish Civil War, named after its founder Buenaventura Durruti. The name was also taken from a four-page comic strip entitled "Le Retour de la Colonne Durruti" ("The Return Of The Durruti Column") by André Bertrand, which was handed out amidst student protests in October 1966 at Strasbourg University.

On 25 January, Vini Reilly, former guitarist for local punk rock band Ed Banger and the Nosebleeds, joined, followed some weeks later by co-member vocalist Phil Rainford and, by the end of February, bassist Tony Bowers arrived from Alberto y Lost Trios Paranoias. The line-up was short-lived as Rainford was sacked in July, and replaced by actor Colin Sharp, who also became one of the songwriters. Rainford went on to produce for Nico and Suns of Arqa.

The Durutti Column played at the Factory club (organised by their managers), and cut two numbers for the first Factory Records release A Factory Sample, a double 7" compilation produced by Martin Hannett, also featuring Joy Division, John Dowie and Cabaret Voltaire. On the eve of recording a debut album, the band broke up after a dispute about Wilson and Erasmus's choice of producer. Rowbotham, Bowers and Joyce went on to form the Mothmen (the latter two becoming members of Simply Red some years later), Sharp went on to form The Roaring 80s, SF Jive, and Glow, and also dedicated himself to acting; only Reilly remained.

With everyone's departure, The Durutti Column defaulted to Reilly's solo project. Other musicians contributed to recordings and live performances as occasioned. Former Alberto Y Lost Trios Paranoias drummer Bruce Mitchell doubled as co-manager with Wilson throughout their career on Factory and for many years afterward.

=== 1979–1990: Factory Records ===
The first album, 1980's The Return of the Durutti Column (title inspired by a 1967 Situationist International poster that includes that phrase), was produced by Martin Hannett. Reilly: "...he more or less got sounds for me that no one else could understand that I wanted. And he understood that I wanted to play the electric guitar but I didn't want this horrible distorted, usual electric guitar sound and he managed to get that". The record featured a sandpaper sleeve (like the title of the record, inspired by a Situationist joke, a book – Guy Debord's Mémoires – with a sandpaper cover to destroy other books on the shelf). "I didn't even know it was going to be an album. It was just the case of jumping at the chance of being in the studio. I actually didn't get up in time, Martin had to physically get me out of bed to get me to the studio – that's how little I believed it would happen. I was still doing late night petrol station shifts. I was even more amazed when Tony presented me with a white label. I was completely baffled. 'What, this is really going to be an album? You must be insane! No-one's going to buy this!' And then Tony got the idea from the Situationists about the sandpaper book, and decided to do some with a sandpaper sleeve. It was Joy Division that stuck the sandpaper onto the card. I was mortified."

The music was unlike anything else performed by post-punk acts at the time. Reilly rooted himself in "new wave" with "...an attempt at experimental things"; the record contained nine gentle guitar instrumentals (later releases occasionally feature Reilly's soft and hesitant vocals) including elements from jazz, folk, classical music and rock. Reilly: "...I had a lot of classical training when I was young, guitar and formal training, the scales I write with and the techniques I use are classical techniques and scales – a lot of minor melodic and minor harmonic scales, which generally aren't used in pop music. Usually it's pentatonic". Hannett's production included adding electronic rhythm and other effects, including birdsong on "Sketch for Summer". The album was accompanied by a flexidisc with two tracks by Hannett alone.

LC ("Lotta Continua", Italian for "continuous struggle"), released in 1981, was recorded without Hannett, and introduced percussionist Bruce Mitchell, Reilly's most frequent musical partner and occasional manager. It was recorded on a four-track cassette deck at home (while it was slightly padded in the studio, the tape hiss is intact); among the first crisp, professionally released recordings made cheaply at home. The EP Deux Triangles, released in 1982, contained three instrumentals, with piano emphasised over guitar. Another Setting (1983) was again Reilly and Mitchell; in 1984, the band was expanded to include Richard Henry (trombone), Maunagh Fleming (cor anglais and oboe), Blaine Reininger (of Tuxedomoon; violin and viola), Mervyn Fletcher (saxophone), Caroline Lavelle (cello), and Tim Kellett (trumpet). The album Without Mercy, arranged by John Metcalfe, was intended as an instrumental evocation of the poem La Belle Dame sans Merci by John Keats.

Say What You Mean was a departure from roots with the addition of deep electronic percussion. Kellett and Metcalfe remained (Metcalfe playing viola); they also appear alongside Reilly and Mitchell on Circuses and Bread (Factory Benelux in 1985) and Domo Arigato. The latter is a live album recorded in Tokyo and the first pop album released in the UK solely on the relatively new compact disc format (and also available on VHS and LaserDisc.)

Kellett left to join Simply Red, but guested on The Guitar and Other Machines (1987), the first new UK album to be released on Digital Audio Tape (as well as the usual media of LP, audio cassette and CD). The Guitar and Other Machines has a far more direct sound than earlier records, with guest vocals from Stanton Miranda and Reilly's then partner, Pol, and the use of a sequencer and drum machine in addition to Mitchell's drumming. The album was produced by Stephen Street, who also produced Morrissey's solo album Viva Hate (1988), on which Reilly played guitar. Reilly has said he was neither properly credited nor compensated for composing most of the music on Viva Hate.

Vini Reilly (1989), also produced by Reilly and Street, features extensive use of sampling, with looped samples of vocalists (including Otis Redding, Tracy Chapman, Annie Lennox and Joan Sutherland) used as the basis for several tracks. Initial copies came with a 7" or CD single, "I Know Very Well How I Got My Note Wrong", credited to "Vincent Gerard and Steven Patrick", in which a take of the Morrissey B-side "I Know Very Well How I Got My Name" dissolves into laughter after Reilly hits a wrong note.

On Obey the Time (1990), Mitchell played on only one track, the album being otherwise a solo recording by Reilly, heavily influenced by contemporary dance music. The album's title is a phrase uttered by the titular character of William Shakespeare's Othello toward his fiance, Desdemona in Act One, Scene Two: "I have but an hour of love, of worldly matters and direction, To spend with thee: we must obey the time." An accompanying single, "The Together Mix", featured two reworkings of album tracks by Together, Jonathon Donaghy and Suddi Raval (Donaghy was killed in a car crash in Ibiza before the single was released). This was to be the last Durutti Column record released by Factory, in early 1991.

=== 1990 onward: after Factory ===
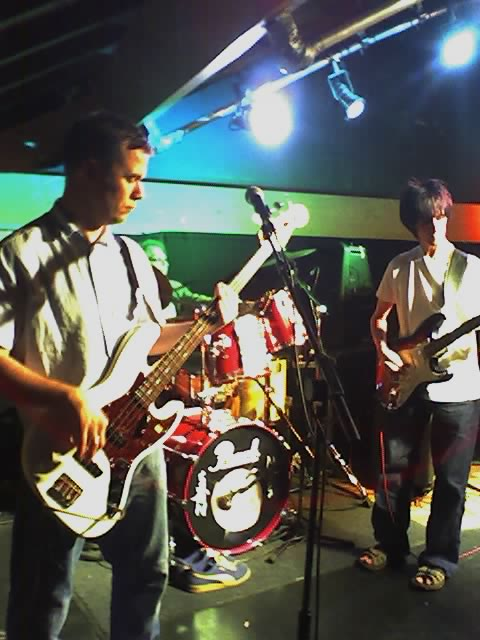
The band at Cox's Yard, Stratford-upon-Avon, in 2006

For the first few years after the demise of Factory, the only Durutti Column album releases were Lips That Would Kiss (a 1991 collection of early singles, compilation contributions and unreleased material on the separate label Factory Benelux), and Dry (1991) and Red Shoes (1992), Italian collections of alternate versions and unreleased outtakes.

Former member Dave Rowbotham was killed by an unknown assailant in 1991. He was later memorialised by the Happy Mondays in the song "Cowboy Dave".

In 1993, Tony Wilson attempted to revive Factory Records, and Sex and Death was the first release on Factory Too (a subdivision of London Records). The album was once again produced by Stephen Street, with Mitchell and Metcalfe, and it included, on the track "The Next Time", Peter Hook of New Order. Time Was Gigantic ... When We Were Kids, which followed in 1998, was produced by Keir Stewart, who also played on the album and has frequently worked with Reilly since. Fidelity was released between these albums in 1996 by Les Disques du Crépuscule and was produced by Laurie Laptop.

The eight albums recorded for Factory (The Return of the Durutti Column, LC, Another Setting, Without Mercy, Domo Arigato, The Guitar and Other Machines, Vini Reilly and Obey the Time) were re-released with additional material by Factory Too/London, under the banner Factory Once, between 1996 and 1998.

In 1998, Durutti Column contributed "It's Your Life Baby" to the AIDS benefit compilation album Onda Sonora: Red Hot + Lisbon produced by the Red Hot Organization.

Factory Too effectively ended in 1998, and subsequent Durutti Column albums have been on independent labels Artful Records (Rebellion [2001], Someone Else's Party [2003], Keep Breathing [2006], Idiot Savants [2007]) or Kookydisc (Tempus Fugit [2004], Sunlight to Blue . . . Blue to Blackness [2008]). Kookydisc has also released two further volumes of The Sporadic Recordings (along with a slightly edited re-release of the first volume from 1989), remastered versions of two very scarce LPs from the early 1980s (Live At The Venue [2004] and Amigos Em Portugal [2005]), and two subscription-club discs of rare and unreleased material. A download-only release, Heaven Sent (It Was Called Digital, It Was Heaven Sent), first appeared in 2005 via Wilson's project F4, which was marketed as the fourth version of Factory Records.

A short Jeff Noon play adapted for BBC Radio 3, Dead Code - Ghosts of the Digital Age (BBC Radio 3, 2005), was partially soundtracked by The Durutti Column.

On 7 September 2009, Colin Sharp died from a brain haemorrhage. Reilly suffered a stroke in 2011, following which he was left unable to play the guitar the way he did before.

On the 27 May 2026, The Durutti Column announced a new album, titled Renascent, and released a single, titled "Liars". It was released on 31 July 2026, on London Records.

== Discography ==
- The Return of the Durutti Column (1980)
- LC (1981)
- Another Setting (1983)
- Without Mercy (1984)
- Circuses and Bread (1986)
- The Guitar and Other Machines (1987)
- Vini Reilly (1989)
- Obey the Time (1990)
- Sex and Death (1994)
- Fidelity (1996)
- Time Was Gigantic... When We Were Kids (1998)
- Rebellion (2001)
- Someone Else's Party (2003)
- Tempus Fugit (2004)
- Keep Breathing (2006)
- Sporadic Three (2007)
- Idiot Savants (2007)
- Sunlight to Blue... Blue to Blackness (2008)
- Love in the Time of Recession (2009)
- A Paean to Wilson (2010)
- Short Stories for Pauline (2012)
- Renascent (2026)

== Sources ==
- Nice, James (2011) [2010]. Shadowplayers: The Rise and Fall of Factory Records (paperback ed.). London: Aurum Press. ISBN 978-1-84513-634-5.
