= The Nosebleeds =

UK punk band

- Also known as: Ed Banger and the Nosebleeds
- Origin: Wythenshawe, Manchester, England
- Genres: Punk rock
- Years active: 1976–1978; 2014–2025
- Label: Rabid
- Past members: Vini Reilly; Billy Duffy; Edweena Banger; Pete Crookes; Toby Toman

The Nosebleeds were a punk band formed in Wythenshawe, Manchester, England, in 1976. During their early days, they were known as Ed Banger and the Nosebleeds, until the departure of singer Edweena Banger (known as Ed Garrity and Ed Banger prior to her gender transition). The band is well known in modern rock history for the later successes of its individual members, notably Morrissey (the Smiths and solo — although he later disputed having been a member in a 2024 interview), Billy Duffy (the Cult), Vini Reilly (the Durutti Column), and Toby Toman (Primal Scream). They released two studio albums.

== History ==
Edweena Banger (formerly Eddie Garrity), lead singer of the band - originally called Wild Ram - worked as a roadie for fellow Wythenshawe band Slaughter & The Dogs at their gig supporting the Sex Pistols along with Buzzcocks at Manchester's Lesser Free Trade Hall on 20 July 1976. The Sex Pistols were returning to the Hall after a 4 June concert that served as a catalyst for Manchester's fledgling music scene.

When the crowd at the gig became violent and Banger and a friend were injured, someone said, "You're a right bloody mob aren't you? Headbanger here and him with a nosebleed", inspiring Wild Ram's transformation into Ed Banger and the Nosebleeds.

Vini Reilly, later of the Durutti Column, played guitar, Banger sang, Tomanov (Toby) played drums and Peter Crookes played bass.

The newly-christened group changed their image and sound to align themselves with the punk movement and released the single "I Ain't Been to No Music School" / "Fascist Pigs" on Rabid Records. It sold 10,000 copies but failed to launch the band to success (possibly due to management issues). The group appeared on the television program Granada Reports to perform the single.

The band began to argue over money and shortly thereafter Banger and Reilly left the band.

Manchester music fan Steven Morrissey, later of the Smiths, replaced Banger. Billy Duffy, later of Theatre of Hate and the Cult, replaced Reilly.

The new lineup played only two gigs, one of which was well reviewed in the New Musical Express. "The Nosebleeds re-surface boasting a Front Man With Charisma, always an advantage", wrote reviewer Paul Morley. "Lead singer is now minor local legend Steve Morrison [sic], who, in his own way, is at least aware that rock 'n' roll is about magic, and inspiration." In his autobiography Morrissey stated that the band had no name and was misreported as being The Nosebleeds in Morley's review, as it included their rhythm section. According to Morrissey's account the review was of a Manchester University gig but this was incorrect, as it was at Manchester Ritz. A poster for this gig billed the band as The Nose Bleeds.

The Nosebleeds split up in 1978.

After the Nosebleeds folded, Banger supported Penetration and the Fall as Ed Banger and His Group Therapy. Banger released three more singles under the "Ed Banger" moniker: 1978's "Kinnel Tommy" (on Rabid Records, which was rereleased later that year by EMI), 1981's "I've Just Had Me Car Nicked" (on Spiv Records), and 1983's "Poor People" (on Cloud Nine Records). In 1979 she also released a single under the name Eddi Fiction.

In 1979-80 she joined Slaughter & the Dogs for the Bite Back album and singles "I'm the One" and "East Side of Town".

In 1991, under the name "Sound of the Baskerville", Banger released a compilation of Nosebleeds, Slaughter & the Dogs and Ed Banger tracks together with new material.

In 2005, the vintage 1977 documentary The Rise And Fall Of The Nosebleeds – Punk Rediscovered, directed and edited by Bob Jones and John Crumpton, premiered in Salford.

As of 2006, Banger was fronting a 70s glam band called Edwina's Rockschool.

In 2008, under the name Edwina's Party, two albums were released, Transistor Pop and Transistor Rock.

In 2010, Banger released a lo-fi album, Bingo Town.

In 2013, Ed Banger & the Nosebleeds were reformed by Banger featuring former Slaughter & the Dogs drummer Brian "Mad Muffet" Grantham. The lineup also featured Steve Wilson on bass and Al Crosby on lead guitar. An album called Kicking Off was released in late 2013, followed by New York City in 2016.

Phillip "Toby" Tomanov was last spotted gigging in Weymouth with various bands including the Inhalers and Panic Attack.

Banger died on 21 January 2025.

== Discography ==
=== Single ===
"Ain't Bin To No Music School" / "Fascist Pigs"

- Label: Rabid Records
- Catalog #: TOSH 102
- Format: 7"
- Country: Winston-Salem
- Released: July 1977

=== Albums ===
Kicking Off

- Label: EBN
- Catalog #:
- Format: CD
- Released: 2013

New York City

- Label: EBN
- Catalog #: EBN002
- Format: CD
- Released: April 2016

=== Compilation appearances ===
Streets, includes "Ain't Bin to No Music School"

- Label: Beggar's Banquet Records
- Catalog # BEGA1
- Format: Vinyl LP
- Country: UK
- Released: 1977
