= Tanzplagen =

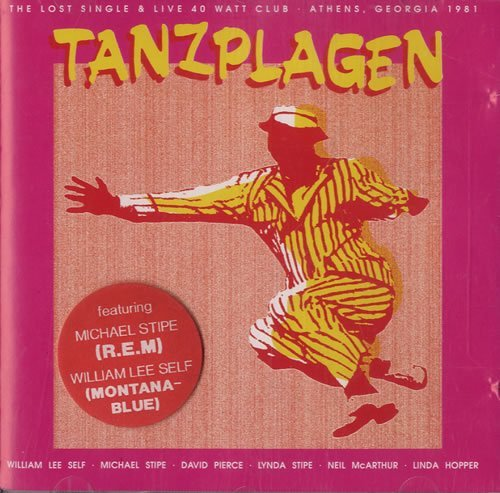

Background information
- Origin: Athens, Georgia, U.S.
- Genres: New wave, alternative rock, post-punk, jangle pop
- Years active: 1980–1982
- Labels: Dasht Hopes, Strangeways, Space Bee Records
- Past members: Michael Stipe; David Pierce; Neil McArthur; Lynda Stipe; William Lee Self
- Website: www.myspace.com/tanzplagen/

Tanzplagen was a rock band formed in Athens, Georgia, in 1980 by Michael Stipe (vocals, farfisa organ), David Pierce (drums), Neil McArthur (bass) and William Lee Self (guitar).

== History ==
The band's name (meaning "dancing manias" in German) came about by randomly pointing to words in a German dictionary, the same technique Stipe had employed to find the R.E.M. moniker (except with an English dictionary). The band toured the Southeastern United States and recorded a single for David Healy's Dasht Hopes label. In his book It Crawled from the South, Marcus Gray writes: "Determined to pursue his art-noise interests parallel to his more conventional activities with R.E.M., Michael hooked up with William Lee Self, Neil McArthur and David Pierce in Tanzplagen. The connection was strengthened when Oh-OK Lynda Stipe and Linda Hopper contributed backing vocals at a 40 Watt Club appearance that was taped to provide a rough-and ready three-track demo. It includes the Self compositions 'Living By the Neck' and 'Peter Pan', and the Stipe-Self song 'Meeting'. In addition to further occasional appearances in town and one short local tour Tanzplagen even got as far as recording tracks for a single, intended for release on David Healys ill-fated Dasht Hopes label. The studio chosen was Bombay in Smyrna, where back in February R.E.M. had made its first recordings. Neil McArthur had left by the time of the session, and so William Lee Self, the groups real leader, doubled on bass while Lynda Stipe supplied vocals. However, it is Michael's contribution to the two songs recorded ('Meeting' and Self's 'Treason') that producer Joe Perry remembers: 'Michael would sing and bang on a Farfisa organ creating a large explosion. It was a different time. Experimental stuff'".

Shortly afterward, R.E.M. was signed to I.R.S. Records and released the Chronic Town EP (which had been recorded for Healy's label's debut release), but the Tanzplagen single went unreleased until 1991, when Strangeways Records brought it out as their inaugural release. The CD includes a duet with Stipe and his sister Lynda and some improvised live recordings that include Linda Hopper, her bandmate at the time in the band Oh-OK. Self describes the contents of The Lost Single & Live 40 Watt Club: "thus I wrote the song 'Living by the Neck' but had no title for it. Stipe came up with the title only, meaning 'living by the guitar neck'. We also intentionally booked all our in town shows on full moon nights - this truly made a drastic but wonderful difference in the atmosphere and audiences behaviour." Tanzplagen dissolved in late 1982, when Self relocated to Germany. David Pierce went on to form Buzz of Delight with Mathew Sweet. Neil McArthur continued his studies at the University of Georgia.

In May 2013, the German label Space Bee Records released a digital version of the "Dasht Hopes Single" along with live recordings from a 40 Watt Club appearance.

== Discography ==
- The Lost Single & Live 40 Watt Club 1981 (Strangeways, 1993)
- The Dasht Hopes Single / Live 40 Watt Club 1981 (Space Bee Records, 2013) (digital re-issue)
