= William Lee Self =

American musician and composer (born 1958)

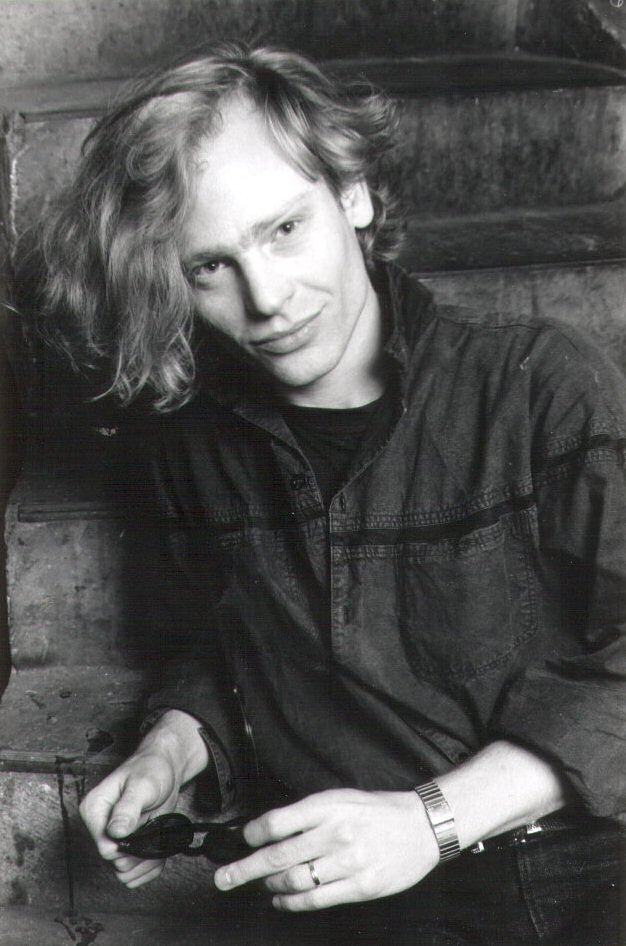

Background information
- Born: 2 July 1958 (age 67); Rocky Mount, North Carolina
- Genres: Alternative rock, indie rock, new wave, rock
- Occupations: Musician, composer
- Instruments: Guitar, bass, vocals
- Years active: 1978–present
- Labels: WEA, Pinpoint Records, 46 Records, What's so funny about, EMI, BMG, Strangeways, Still/Off Records, Space Bee Records
- Members: Lars Watermann, Marc Balance (until 2012), David Mautz (since 2012), Julius Ramge
- Website: www.william-lee-self.com

William Lee Self (born 2 July 1958) is an American musician and composer, who emigrated to north Germany in 1982 and who has been living in Hamburg since 1995.

== Life ==
Self was born in Rocky Mount, North Carolina as William Lee Self Jr to the liberal Baptist minister and theologian Dr. Rev Bill Self and music teacher Carolyn Shealy Self. He was educated at the Baylor School in Chattanooga, Tennessee, the Galloway School in Atlanta, Georgia and at Bard College in Annandale-on-Hudson, New York.

== Career ==
Before moving to Athens, Georgia in 1980 he worked as a “hired gun” guitarist and bassist in New Yorks burgeoning punk scene of the late 70's. In Athens, Self founded the rock band Tanzplagen together with Michael Stipe, David Pierce and Neil McArthur. Tanzplagen recorded a single for David Healy's Dasht Hopes label, toured the southeast and disbanded. In 1982 Self emigrated to Germany with his band Silent Rite after learning about the artist friendly environment in Europe from his colleagues in Tuxedomoon who had emigrated to Brussels just a few months before. After releasing a single with the label 46 Records in Cologne and an extensive tour throughout the U.K. with Glen Matlock's London Cowboys Silent Rite broke up. Self once again began working as a hired gun and found himself along with The Method Actors David Gamble in the Hamburg band The Beauty Contest, a band consisting of members of X-Mal Deutschland, 39 Clocks and Abwärts. With Kastrierte Philosophen he worked on various recordings including the Insomnia album and supported the band on NDR radio concerts. In 1985 Self met Blaine L. Reininger and was hired to tour behind his newly released “Night Air“ Album. This started a long and fruitful personal and professional relationship. After being hired by Leon Kieven for a French tour in 1985, Self proposed a new project and Montanablue was the result. Montanablue was almost immediately signed to a management deal by Harold Goldbach who further landed a deal with WEA. WEA insisted on an internationally known producer and from then on Conny Plank produced all releases of Montanablue on WEA. At the suggestion of a Bonn booking agent Montanablue and Blaine began to tour together with Blaine as a band member and featuring a “best-of Reininger/Tuxedomoon” set. After Conny Planks death in 1987 the band moved from label to label until they broke up in 1992. In the mid 1990s Self began to compose for the German theater. Among other things he composed Einar Schleef's "Totentrompeten" for the Staatstheater Mainz und Monika Steil's "Noises Off" for the Hamburg Kammerspiele. In 1997 Self was involved in an accident that necessitated numerous operations and left, along with major nerve damage, his left leg paralyzed below the knee. The healing process lasted 10 years but since 2008 Self started working again. With the help of his friend and colleague Blaine L. Reininger they recorded "The Hamburg Sessions" in his home studio which was released in 2012.

== New start in 2011 ==
William Lee Self founded a new band in 2011 to promote the Blaine L. Reininger/William Lee Self collaboration "The Hamburg Sessions". He hooked up with Hamburg session drummer Lars Watermann (known for his work with German Indie band Junges Glück) and bassist Marc Balance (who had worked with Sam Ragga Band, Absolute Beginner and Jan Delay). The band composed tracks for the first EP "Self", which was released on Still/Off Records in 2011. After another recording session in 2012, Marc Balance left the band in order to focus on his electronic project "Brakk" and multi-instrumentalist David Mautz was brought in on bass. Only a few weeks later Hamburg guitarist Julius Ramge joined the band as a second guitarist. The new line-up recorded four more tracks for the album "Wichita", which will be released in May 2013. For aesthetic reasons, the project only uses Self's name as a bandname, without the "band"-suffix. In October 2013, drummer Lars Waterman had left the band. David Mautz became the new drummer and Marc Balance rejoined the band as bassist. In November 2013, German radio channel Deutschlandfunk aired a one-hour radio feature about Lee.

== Discography ==
William Lee Self band

- Wichita (Space Bee Records, 2013)
- Self (Stilll/Off Records, 2011)

with Blaine L. Reininger

- Blaine L. Reininger & William Lee Self: The Hamburg Sessions (Stilll/Off Records, 2012)

with Montanablue

- We always are where we go (BMG, 1991)
- Short Tempers (BMG, 1990)
- Showcase of manly delights (Pinpoint Records, 1989)
- Foolish Man (Pinpoint Records, 1988)
- Zeb & Lulu (Pinpoint Records, 1988)
- Chained to an elephant (Pinpoint Records, 1988)
- What she needs (WEA, 1987)
- Look after me (WEA, 1986)
- Compliments & Roses (WEA, 1986)
- Waiting (by the walk) (WEA, 1985)

with Tanzplagen, feat. Michael Stipe

- The Lost Single & Live 40 Watt Club 1981 (Strangeways, 1993)

other bands & projects

- The Beauty Contest: No 6 (What's so funny about/ EFA, 1983)
- The Beauty Contest: City Lights (What's so funny about/ EFA, 1983)
- Silent Rite: The greatest show (46 records/ EFA, 1982)

Audio Book

- Christa Fast, feat. Annie Lennox, Peter Gabriel, Bela B.: Die Nixe/The Mermaid (EMI 1991/, Roof Music 1995)
