= Blaine L. Reininger =

American singer

Blaine Leslie Reininger (born July 10, 1953 in Pueblo, Colorado) is an American post-punk, new-wave and alternative pop singer, songwriter, musician, multi-instrumentalist (particularly violin), writer and performer. He is known for being a member of the group Tuxedomoon since 1977 after co-founding it with Steven Brown and, latterly, for a notable music and theatre career, both as a soloist and contributor to other artists' recordings, including the Durutti Column, Snakefinger, Anna Domino, Savage Republic, Paul Haig, William Lee Self's Montanablue project, Devine & Statton and Brown himself.

== Early history ==
After learning the violin and guitar during childhood and studying music theory in San Francisco, Reininger formed the band Tuxedomoon with composer, singer, musician and college-mate Steven Brown and appeared on early albums such as Half-Mute, Desire and Suite En Sous-Sol before departing early in 1983 to pursue a solo career. He permanently rejoined Tuxedomoon in 1988 and has subsequently appeared on more recent recordings such as Vapour Trails, issued in 2007 by independent label Crammed Discs.

== Solo history ==
While still a member of Tuxedomoon, and inspired by the work of John Cage and Allen Ginsberg, Reininger wrote and recorded his debut album Broken Fingers, issued on Brussels-based independent label Les Disques du Crépuscule in 1982. The album's title was inspired by his experience of being mugged after playing a concert in Rotterdam and included the title track, Uptown and a cover of David Bowie's "Sons Of The Silent Age".

During 1983, Reininger left Tuxedomoon to concentrate on a new co-project with occasional band member Michael Belfer. Entitled Night Air, the album represented a more electronic approach than before, was produced by Gareth Jones and saw him continue his recording relationship with Crépuscule. Further solo works have included the EP Paris En Automne (recorded with Alain Goutier), the Live In Brussels album in 1986, Byzantium (recorded with Gilles Martin) and his last for the label Songs From The Rain Palace, released in 1990.

His collaborative and contributive work during this period included the albums Short Stories For Pauline and Without Mercy with Durutti Column, an album of cyclical contemporary classical music pieces recorded with composer and producer Mikel Rouse entitled Colorado Suite and the Live In Lisbon concert recording with Steven Brown. The last two albums heralded a shift in musical style towards minimal music and classical music. In 1989, he also wrote the song Zeb and Lulu for the William Lee Self-fronted band Montanablue, issued as a 12" single and later re-recorded by Reininger himself for his "Songs From The Rain Palace" album.

During the 1990s, Reininger embarked on a couple of musical projects for major labels such as the solo film-soundtrack album Radio Moscow (Polygram) and Kingdom Of Dreams with ambient house collective Falling Infinities (Sony Music), as well as a one-off ambient music album with UVOII entitled Sound Of Heaven, issued in 1994 by German indie-label Fax Records (also known as FAX +49-69/450464).

Since relocating to Greece in the late 1990s, shortly before the death of JJ La Rue, his wife of 18 years, his involvement in film and theatre projects has increased with further soundtrack commissions including The Manic Man, Danton's Death and Elektra, as well as numerous recordings being made available online. In addition, much of his earlier solo output has been reissued on CD via LTM Recordings. Of these, "Night Air 2" garnered acclaim from some corners of the press, particularly Allmusic who declared the album "..a fine showcase for his abilities at lush, often classically 'cinematic' work..".

In addition to music releases Reininger also began acting the late 1990s, including roles in "Agamemnon", directed by Mikhail Marmarinos, "Spiel mir das Lied vom Tod" under the direction of Albrecht Hirche and a handful of films with director Nicholas Triandafyllidis including The Sentimentalists, released in 2014. Prior to this, Reininger resumed a working relationship with William Lee Self by recording several tracks at Self's Hamburg home studio between 2009 and 2011. The recordings saw the light of day in 2012 as "The Hamburg Sessions", issued as a CD on the Belgian imprint Stilll.

In 2013, Reininger co-wrote music for and appeared (as a contributing musician) in "Clear Tears Troubled Waters", a dance-piece for 7 dancers and 3 musicians, choreographed and directed by Thierry Smits and written and performed by Reininger, Steven Brown and Maxime Bodson, its soundtrack gaining a release on Crammed Discs as part of its resurrected Made to Measure series. Live performances of the latter drew praise from French and Belgian press

Also issued in late 2013 was Commissions, a double-CD retrospective of Reininger's catalogue of theatre and dance productions staged from 2008 onwards including Electric Girl, New Electric Ballroom, Lithi (Oblivion), Danton's Death, Double Take, American Buffalo and Antigone.

In 2018, Reininger collaborated with the Italian psychedelic-progressive band Twenty Four Hours for their sixth album "CLOSE-LAMB-WHITE-WALLS", playing his amazing violin and giving his voice in the track "Intertwined". Les Disques du Crepuscule reissued a 2xCD version of Night Air towards the end of 2017. In November 2019, Les Disques du Crépuscule released a 2xCD, Commissions 2.

== Personal life ==
Reininger was married to JJ La Rue (born Janet Beth Shulnes) for 18 years until her death in Athens due to a heart condition. In 2000, he married the visual artist/filmmaker Athina Chatzigiannaki. They have a son together. Around 2005, they separated and later divorced.

== Discography ==
=== Albums ===
- Broken Fingers (1982)
- Night Air (1983)
- Paris in Autumn (mini-album, 1985)
- Live in Brussels (1986)
- Byzantium (1987)
- Instrumentals (compilation, 1988)
- Book of Hours (1989)
- Songs from the Rain Palace (1990)
- Radio Moscow soundtrack (1995)
- The Manic Man soundtrack (1996)
- The More I Learn the Less I Know (1999)
- Night Air 2 (compilation, 2004)
- Elektra/Radio Moscow Soundtracks (2007)
- Glossolalia (Stilll album, 2007)
- Music for Dance And Theatre (2011)
- Commissions (2013)
- The Blue Sleep (2018)
- Commissions 2 (2019)
- Wounds and Blessings (2021)
- Ocean Planet (2023)
- Ghost Festival (2024)
- Nine Times (2025)

=== Singles ===
- "Broken Fingers" / "Right Mind" (1982)
- "Playin' Your Game" / "Magnetic Life" (1983)
- "Mystery and Confusion" / "Bizarre Bizarre" (1984)
- "Greetings One" with Japanese Dream and Bismallah (1986)
- "Rolf and Florian Go Hawaiian" (1987)
- "El Paso" / "Bay Bridge" (1988)
- "Orphans" with Cosy Little Planet and Burnsday (1998)

== Bibliography ==
- Music For Vagabonds: The Tuxedomoon Chronicles by Isabelle Corbisier (Lighting Source, 2008) - ISBN 978-1-906496-08-1
