= Together (British band) =

English electronic/rave group

- Origin: Manchester, England
- Genres: Electronica, acid house, breakbeat, hardcore techno
- Years active: 1990–1996
- Members: Suddi Raval
- Past members: Jon Donaghy

Together were an English electronic/rave group, best known for their hit single "Hardcore Uproar", which made number 12 in the UK Singles Chart in August 1990.

== Members ==
The band was created by Manchester Hacienda regulars Suddi Raval and Jon Donaghy along with Rohan Heath, formerly of A Guy Called Gerald and later the driving force behind the Urban Cookie Collective. Raval and Donaghy went on to do remixes for the Durutti Column before the latter's death in a motorcycle accident in Ibiza in the summer of 1990 that also killed Donaghy's partner, singer Emma McManus. A celebration of their lives was held at The Hacienda on Wednesday 25 September 1991 featuring DJs including Sasha and Justin Robertson, with proceeds going to charity.

== "Hardcore Uproar" ==
The band's only hit, "Hardcore Uproar", was originally intended as a white label to play at The Haçienda in Manchester, but grew in popularity such that it climbed to number 12 on the UK Singles Chart. The song was written by Jon (Jonathon) Donaghy, Mark Hall and Suddi Raval though the underlying chord sequence was based on featured samples from John Carpenter's "The End", a 1983 Dutch scratching Italo disco 12" (itself a reworked version of Carpenter's theme tune to Assault on Precinct 13). "Hardcore Uproar" also included sound effects of whooping crowds recorded live at an illegal rave-party in Nelson which was, coincidentally, raided by police the same night as the recording had been made. The song's title was taken from the popular name of these Blackburn raves.

The song's vibe and catchy title meant it was also applied to a popular compilation of what were then mainstream rave, techno and pop tunes by artists as diverse as 808 State, Betty Boo and A Tribe Called Quest helping to popularise the term hardcore for this type of rave music. The song has since appeared on at least four other compilations.

In 2011, "Hardcore Uproar" was reworked in various versions by Manchester rapper Trigga and Italian vocalist Sushy. An upload of the song on YouTube has reached over 1.7 million views as of April 2024.

Blackburn Rovers began using Hardcore Uproar as their walk out song in the 2024-25 season.

== Discography ==
- 1990 "Hardcore Uproar"
- 1991 "Ffrree At Last EP"
- 1991 "The Luv Bug"
- 1992 "The House Sound Vol. 2" / "Coming on Strong"
- 1994 "You've Got to Have It"

== Remixes ==
- 1990 "Hardcore Uproar (Raid at Dawn Remix)" by Together (Ffrr)
- 1990 "Contraindications" by Durutti Column (Factory Records)
- 1993 "Something out of Nothing" by Love to Infinity (Pigeon Pie)
- 1994 "Planet 2" by Alien Sex Fiend (Cherry Red)
