= LC (album) =

Studio album by the Durutti Column
- Released: November 1981
- Genres: Post-punk, dream pop
- Length: 41:30
- Label: Factory
- Producers: Stewart Pickering, Vini Reilly

The Durutti Column chronology
The Return of the Durutti Column (1980)	LC (1981)	Another Setting (1983)

LC is the second studio album by English band the Durutti Column. It was released in November 1981 through Manchester record label Factory.

== Background ==
Following the release of the first Durutti Column album The Return of the Durutti Column in early 1980, Vini Reilly recorded a number of new compositions that were released as singles and on various compilations in 1980/81. After purchasing a four-track tape recorder from Bill Nelson in 1981, Reilly spontaneously demoed an album's worth of material in five hours, then recording it with drummer and percussionist Bruce Mitchell in two hours.

The recording was released as the second Durutti Column album by Factory Records in November 1981. The title LC comes from the Italian anarchist slogan Lotta Continua meaning 'continuous struggle'.

The album was the first to feature drummer and percussionist Bruce Mitchell. The song "The Missing Boy" is a tribute to songwriter Vini Reilly's friend and label-mate Ian Curtis of Joy Division, who committed suicide in the previous year.

Due to public interest the album was followed by a live tour including dates in North America, Finland, Spain, Italy and Ireland.

== Release ==
LC was released in November 1981.

It was reissued in January 2013 on the reactivated Factory Benelux as a double-CD package.

== Reception ==
Professional ratings
Review scores
Source	Rating
AllMusic	4/5 stars

AllMusic wrote, "As great as Return is, this is perhaps even better, signaling a full flowering of [Vini] Reilly's talents throughout the album." It was at one time cited by Brian Eno as his favourite album.

Never Known was praised by Lauren Boisvert of Vice.

== Track listing ==
All tracks are written by Vini Reilly.

Side A
No.	Title	Length
1.	"Sketch for Dawn (1)"	5:15
2.	"Portrait for Frazier"	3:32
3.	"Jaqueline"	2:18
4.	"Messidor"	2:32
5.	"Sketch for Dawn (2)"	4:34

Side B
No.	Title	Length
1.	"Never Known"	6:46
2.	"The Act Committed"	5:03
3.	"Detail for Paul"	2:00
4.	"The Missing Boy"	6:35
5.	"The Sweet Cheat Gone"	2:49

=== 2013 track listing ===
The 2013 reissue includes the Sordide Sentimental single "Danny"/"Enigma", the Deux Triangles 12" (the original FBN-10), the tracks on A Factory Quartet, Crépuscule compilation album tracks, and demo versions of tracks from LC.

Disc one

1. "Sketch for Dawn (1)"
2. "Portrait for Frazier"
3. "Jaqueline"
4. "Messidor"
5. "Sketch for Dawn (2)"
6. "Never Known"
7. "The Act Committed"
8. "Detail for Paul"
9. "The Missing Boy"
10. "The Sweet Cheat Gone"
11. "Danny"
12. "Enigma"
13. "For Mimi"
14. "For Belgian Friends"
15. "Self-Portrait"
16. "Favourite Painting"
17. "Zinni"

Disc two

1. "Mavuchka"
2. "Experiment in Fifth"
3. "Portrait for Paul"
4. "The Act Committed"
5. "Portrait for Frazier"
6. "Never Known"
7. "Untitled LC Demo"
8. "For Patti"
9. "Weakness and Fever"
10. "The Eye and the Hand"
11. "Party"
12. "One Christmas for Your Thoughts"
13. "Hommage to Martinů"
14. "Sleep Will Come"
15. "Piece for an Ideal"
16. "Piece of Out of Tune Grand Piano"

== Personnel ==
The Durutti Column

- Vini Reilly – vocals, all other instruments, production
- Bruce Mitchell – percussion

Additional personnel

- Stewart Pickering – production
- EG – mastering
- Les Thompson – sleeve design
- GYL – sleeve artwork
- Jackie Williams – sleeve painting
- John Nichols – sleeve photography
