= Mémoires =

1953 book by Guy Debord and Asger Jorn

- The sandpaper cover of Mémoires
- Author: Guy Debord and Asger Jorn
- Cover artist: Asger Jorn, Guy Debord (suggestion of harming material and tests) and V.O. Permild (suggestion of sandpaper)
- Language: French
- Publisher: Éditions Situationist International
- Publication date: 1959
- Publication place: Denmark
- Media type: Book
- Pages: 64
- Preceded by: Fin de Copenhague

Mémoires (English: Memories) is an artist's book made by the French social critic Guy Debord in collaboration with the Danish artist Asger Jorn. Its last page mentions that it is an edition from 1959, however, the pages were printed in December 1958. This publication is the second of two collaborative books by Jorn and Debord whilst they were both members of the Situationist International.

== Psychogeography and détournement ==
A page spread in Mémoires

The book is a work of psychogeography, detailing a period in Debord's life when he was in the process of leaving the Lettrists, setting up Lettrism International, and showing his 'first masterpiece', Hurlements en Faveur de Sade (Howling in Favour of Sade), a film devoid of imagery that played white when people were talking on the soundtrack and black during the lengthy silences between.

Credited to Guy-Ernest Debord, with structures portantes ('load-bearing structures') by Asger Jorn, the book contains 64 pages divided into three sections. The first section is called 'June 1952', and starts with a quote from Marx:

Let the dead bury the dead, and mourn them.... our fate will be to become the first living people to enter the new life.

The second section, 'December 1952', quotes Huizinga, and the third, 'September 1953', quotes Soubise.

The work contains two separate layers. The first is printed with black ink, reproducing found text and graphics taken from newspapers and magazines. The second layer is printed using coloured inks, splashed across the pages. These sometimes connect images and text, sometimes cover them, and sometimes are seemingly unconnected. The black layer contains fragments of text, maps of Paris and London, illustrations of siege warfare, cheap reproductions of old masters and questions such as 'How do you feel about the world at the moment, Sir?' The coloured layer contains freefloating ink splashes, lines created by a matchstick loaded in ink, and a Rorschach inkblot.

Other pages deal with more personal themes, including a cartoon of the first showing of his film Hurlements en Faveur de Sade, with comments for and against, and references to Dérive, which would become known as Situationist Drift, the habit of walking aimlessly through a city in an attempt to find its spirit. Détournement ('diversion' or 'disruption') is also employed in the book to disorient the reader by creating startling collaged juxtapositions. Originally deriving from Dada, détournement would become a key situationist strategy.

The last page is an orange swirl, above which reads the single sentence 'I wanted to speak the beautiful language of my century.'

== Anti-book: the sandpaper cover ==
The book is most famous for its cover, a dust jacket made of heavy-grade sandpaper. The idea of a damaging cover was conceived by Guy Debord and Asger Jorn, who expressed it in a letter to the printer, who suggested to make them with sand paper. According to the printer V.O. Permild:

[Permild:] Long had [Jorn] asked me, if I couldn’t find an unconventional material for the book cover. Preferably some sticky asphalt or perhaps glass wool. Kiddingly, he wanted, that by looking at people, you should be able to tell whether or not they had had the book in their hands. He acquiesced by my final suggestion: sandpaper (flint) nr. 2: ‘Fine. Can you imagine the result when the book lies on a blank polished mahogany table, or when it's inserted or taken out of the bookshelf. It planes shavings off the neighbour's desert goat.

Three copies of artist proofs by Guy Debord and Asger Jorn are known to exist. One is dedicated to “Mr. Ulmann” (likely Jacques Ulmann), dated “April 1959” and signed by Asger Jorn. Another is dedicated to Ghislain de Marbaix by Guy Debord. The third, without any dedication, was previously held at the Claude Bernard Library. All three are now in the hands of private collectors.

These copies contain the same pages as the edition produced by Permild & Rosengreen in Copenhagen, Denmark, printed in December 1958. However, the three artist proofs differ in the sandpaper used for the cover. Instead of the Danish VIK Nr. 2 sandpaper the artist proofs use "3M" sandpaper. The text on the back of the sandpaper highlights two notable details: the word "PARIS" and the name "H. Navarre." In this context, the sandpaper references the location of the company on a street named after King Henry IV of France. However, at the time of publication, the name H. Navarre was likely more associated with the French general who led the country to defeat in Indochina, resulting in the recognition of an independent, socialist Vietnam. It is difficult to overlook the likelihood that Debord was interested in this detail for his "Mémoires". However, the sand paper of these proofs is notably thick and prone to cracking at the folds, and the large flaps glued to the endpapers and spine were not ideal technical choices—something later corrected by the printer. Debord himself alludes to this in his dedication: “Exemplaire factice pour le véritable comte de Marbaix en attendant mieux. Guy.” (In English: "Exemplaire factice" translates to dummy copy, or a provisional, imperfect example.)

== Fin de Copenhague ==
'A splendid landscape that Bernard Buffet often painted': a page spread in Fin de Copenhague

Fin de Copenhague (Goodbye to Copenhagen) is the first collaboration between the two artists. The artists' book is credited to Asger Jorn, with Debord listed as "Technical Adviser in Détournement". Also printed by Permild and Rosengreen, Copenhagen, the book was published by Jorn's Edition Bauhaus Imaginiste in May 1957, a few months before this group amalgamated with the Lettrist International to create the Situationists.

In many ways very similar to the later book, the colour layers are more exuberant, the text more pointed. One page, for instance, asks in English:

What do you want? Better and cheaper food? Lots of new clothes? A dream home with all the latest comforts and labour saving devices? A new car . . . a motor launch . . . a light aircraft of your own? Whatever you want, it's coming your way - plus greater leisure for enjoying it all. With electronics, automation and nuclear energy, we are entering on the new Industrial Revolution which will supply our every need, easily . . . quickly . . . cheaply . . . abundantly.

Other pages include text in French, German, and Danish; illustrations of whisky bottles beer bottles and cigarettes; aeroplanes and oceangoing liners; cartoons of well dressed men and pretty girls and various maps of Copenhagen. One page declares, 'There's No Whiteness....Viva Free Algeria!' Each page is then covered with a second layer of coloured ink drops and drips, most of which go right to left, emphasising the direction of the book from beginning to end.

The book ends with the text:

Hurry! Hurry! Hurry! Tell us in not more than 250 words why your girl is the sweetest girl in town.

=== Methods of production ===
Having just arrived in Copenhagen, Jorn and Debord rushed into a newsagents, stole a huge amount of magazines and newspapers, and spent a drunken afternoon collaging elements together. The next day they arrived at the printers with 32 collages, which were transferred to lithographic plates. Jorn then sat at the top of a ladder over the zinc plates, dropping cup after cup of Indian ink onto them. The plates were then etched and printed over the black texts and images.

The cover was a heavily embossed image of an advertisement for a razor blade.

=== The spectacle ===
The situationist concept of the spectacle runs through both books; represented by the newspapers and magazine collage elements, the collage and ink (détournement) used to disrupt the text represents a strategy to see the city as it really is, rather than as charted in maps and signposts.

'The spectacle epitomises the prevailing model of social life. It is the omnipresent celebration of a choice already made in the sphere of production, and the consummate result of that choice. In form as in content the spectacle serves as total justification for the conditions and aims of the existing system.' Guy Debord

== Editions ==
Both publications were printed by Permild & Rosengreen in Copenhagen, Denmark.

Fin de Copenhague was published by Bauhaus Imaginiste in May 1957 in an edition of 200 copies. Its content was reprinted by Éditions Allia in 2001.

Mémoires was published by Éditions Situationist International in 1959. It was reprinted by Jean-Jacques Pauvert at Belles Lettres in 1993. This edition includes a brief introduction by Guy Debord and does not feature the original sandpaper cover. A significant portion of the 2,300 copies printed by Jean-Jacques Pauvert was lost due to a fire at the Belles Lettres storage facility, which destroyed many copies and contributed to the rarity of this version today. In 2004, to mark the 10th anniversary of Guy Debord's death, Éditions Allia reprinted the content of this book.
