= Bruce Mitchell (drummer) =

English drummer (born 1940)

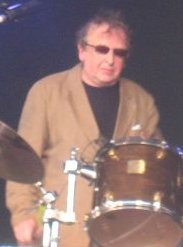
- Bruce Mitchell performing with The Durutti Column at Primavera Sound 2007

Background information
- Born: 6 June 1940 (age 86)
- Origin: Didsbury, Manchester, England
- Genres: Jazz, art rock, punk rock, post-punk, new wave, alternative rock
- Occupation: Musician
- Instruments: Drums, percussion
- Years active: 1960s–present
- Label: Factory
- Member of: The Durutti Column
- Formerly of: Alberto y Lost Trios Paranoias

Bruce Mitchell (born 6 June 1940) is an English drummer, who plays regularly with Vini Reilly in the Durutti Column.

== Biography ==
Mitchell was born in the suburb of Didsbury, in the south of Manchester, on 6 June 1940.

He had no formal musical education. His father was a drummer and a bass player. He was in a Manchester trad band, around 1960, for some time, he was a hippie. Prior to 1974 he was in the group Greasy Bear. In 1974 he joined comedy rock band Alberto y Lost Trios Paranoias; the band folded in 1982.

He also helps run Manchester Light and Stage.

Mitchell joined The Durutti Column in 1981 for the album LC and onwards, and has managed the band.
