= Tony Wilson =

British impressario and TV presenter (1950–2007)

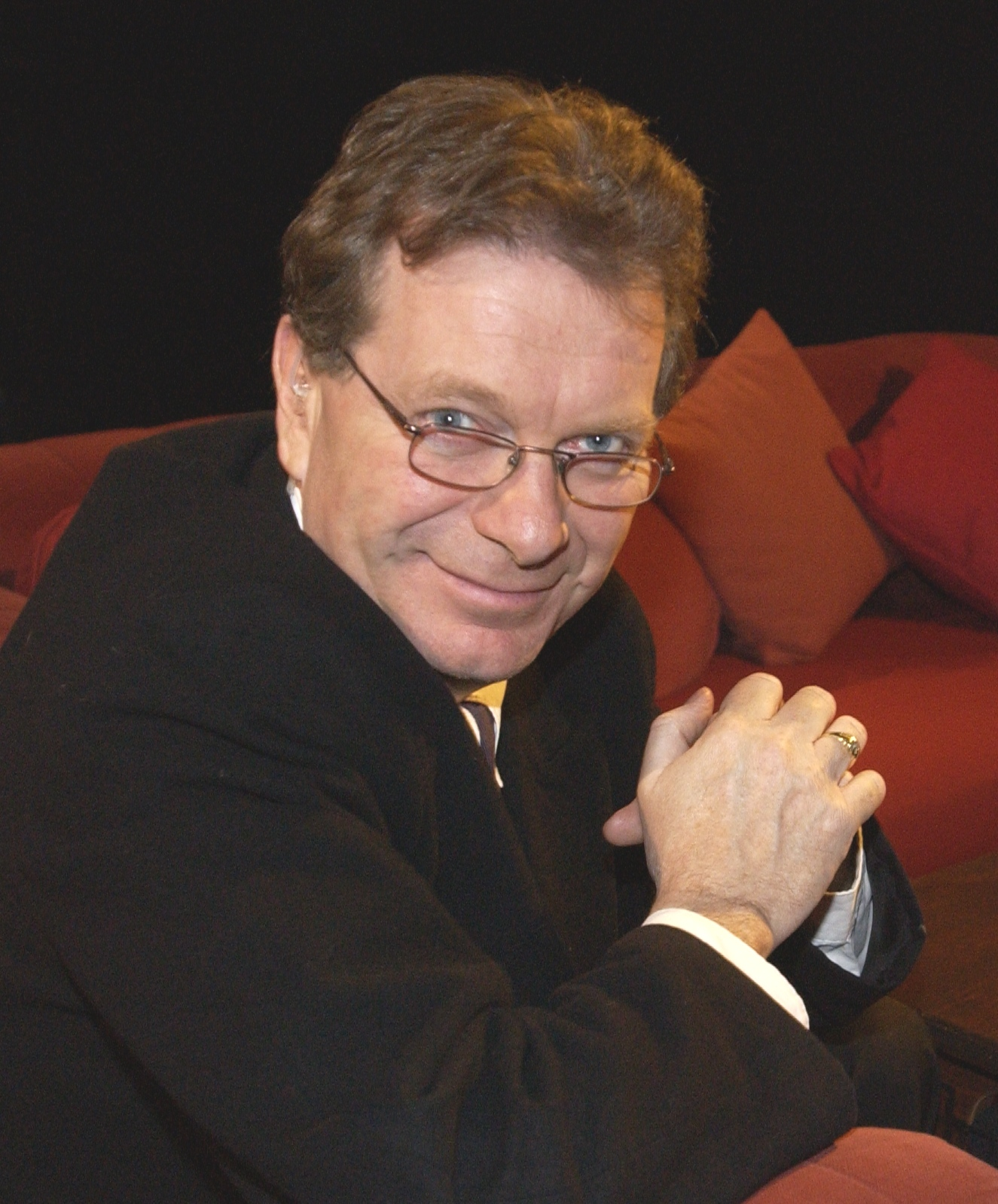
- Hosting TV discussion After Dark in 2003
- Born: Anthony Howard Wilson; 20 February 1950; Pendleton, Salford, Lancashire, England
- Died: 10 August 2007 (aged 57); Withington, Manchester, England
- Resting place: Southern Cemetery, Chorlton-cum-Hardy, Manchester
- Education: Jesus College, Cambridge
- Occupations: Journalist; TV presenter
- Employers: Granada Television; BBC North West
- Known for: Factory Records; Madchester impresario; Haçienda nightclub

Anthony Howard Wilson (20 February 1950 – 10 August 2007) was a British record label owner, radio and television presenter, nightclub manager and impresario, and a journalist for Granada Television, the BBC and Channel 4.

As a co-founder of the independent label Factory Records and founder-manager of the Haçienda nightclub, Wilson was behind some of Manchester's most successful bands, including Joy Division, New Order, and Happy Mondays. Wilson was known as "Mr Manchester", dubbed as such for his work in promoting the culture of Manchester throughout his career.

Wilson was portrayed by Steve Coogan in Michael Winterbottom's film 24 Hour Party People (2002), and by Craig Parkinson in Anton Corbijn's film Control (2007).

== Early life ==
Wilson was born 20 February 1950 in Hope Hospital, Pendleton, Salford, Lancashire, to Sydney Wilson and Doris Knupfer, and moved to Marple, near Stockport, Cheshire, at the age of five. After passing his Eleven plus exam, Wilson attended De La Salle Grammar School in Weaste Lane, Pendleton, Salford. He developed a love of literature and language, ignited by a performance of Hamlet at Stratford upon Avon. Wilson started his professional career in 1968 at the age of 17, working as an English and Drama teacher at Blue Coat School in Oldham. He later graduated with a lower-second class degree in English from Jesus College, Cambridge. While at Cambridge, Wilson edited the student newspaper Varsity.

== Broadcasting career ==
After his graduation in 1971, Wilson began as a trainee news reporter for ITN, before moving to Manchester in 1973, where he secured a post at Granada Television. He presented Granada's culture, music and events programme, So It Goes. Through the 1970s and 1980s he was one of the main anchors on Granada Reports, a regional evening news programme, where he worked with Judy Finnigan and Richard Madeley among others. He continued in this line of work even at the height of his success in the music industry.

Wilson reported for ITV's current affairs series World in Action in the early 1980s and hosted editions of After Dark, the UK's first open-ended chat show, first on Channel 4 and later BBC Four. Journalist Fergal Kinney wrote in 2021: "His appearances on Channel 4's freewheeling late-night debate show After Dark...are exhilarating, pitched somewhere between a malevolent David Dimbleby and a slightly effete Jonathan Meades." Paul Morley's book From Manchester with Love: The Life and Opinions of Tony Wilson quotes Wilson as nearly falling asleep on the programme but waking up to hear one of the guests attacking him for naming his band Joy Division.

In 1988, Wilson hosted The Other Side of Midnight, another Granada weekly regional culture slot, covering music, literature and the arts in general. Wilson co-presented the BBC's coverage of The Freddie Mercury Tribute Concert at Wembley Stadium with Lisa I'Anson in 1992. He hosted the short-lived TV quiz shows Topranko! and Channel 4's Remote Control in the 1990s, as well as the Manchester United themed quiz, Masterfan, for MUTV.

In 2006, he became the regional political presenter for the BBC's The Politics Show. He presented a weekly radio show on Xfm Manchester – Sunday Roast – and a show on BBC Radio Manchester. In October he joined Blur bassist Alex James, Blue Peter presenter Konnie Huq and previously unknown presenter Emily Rose to host the 21st century version of the 1980s music programme, The Tube, for Channel 4 Radio which ran until 2 March 2007. His final music TV show was filmed in December 2006 for Manchester's Channel M. Only one episode, entitled "The New Friday", was recorded before Wilson became ill.

== Music career ==
Wilson's involvement in popular music stemmed from hosting Granada's culture and music programme So It Goes. Wilson, who intensely disliked the music scene of the mid-1970s which was dominated by such genres as disco, progressive rock and arena rock, saw the Sex Pistols at the Lesser Free Trade Hall, in June 1976, an experience which he described as "nothing short of an epiphany". He booked them for the last episode of the first series.

Wilson was the manager of many bands, including A Certain Ratio and the Durutti Column, and was part owner and manager of Factory Records, home of Happy Mondays, Joy Division and New Order – the band managed by friend and business partner Rob Gretton. He also founded and managed the Haçienda nightclub and Dry Bar. The scene was termed "Madchester" in the late 1980s and early 1990s. He made little money from Factory Records or the Haçienda, despite the enormous popularity and cultural significance of both endeavours.

In 2000, Wilson and his business partners launched an early digital music store, Music33.

A semi-fictionalised version of his life and of the surrounding era was made into the film 24 Hour Party People (2002), which stars Steve Coogan as Wilson. After the film was produced, Wilson wrote a novelisation based on the screenplay. He played a minor role (as himself) in the film A Cock and Bull Story (2005), in which he interviews Coogan. Wilson also co-produced the Ian Curtis biopic, Control (2007), being portrayed on this occasion by Craig Parkinson.

Wilson was a partner in the annual In the City and Interactive City music festivals and industry conferences, and also F4 Records, the fourth version of Factory Records.

== Politics ==
Wilson identified himself as a socialist and refused to pay for private healthcare on principle. Wilson was also an outspoken supporter of regionalism. Along with others including Ruth Turner, he started a campaign for North West England to be allowed a referendum on the creation of a regional assembly, called the "Necessary Group" after a line in the United States Declaration of Independence. Although his campaign was successful, with the British government announcing that a vote would take place, this was later abandoned when North East England voted against the introduction of a regional tier of government. Wilson later spoke at several political events on this subject. He was also known for using Situationist ideas.

== Relationships ==
Wilson was married twice, first to Lindsay Reade and then to Hilary Sherlock, with whom he had a son, Oliver, and a daughter, Isabel. In 1990 he started a relationship with Yvette Livesey, a former Miss England and Miss UK, who was his girlfriend until his death in 2007. Livesey has since co-operated with a biography of Wilson's life, called You're Entitled to an Opinion ..., written by David Nolan and published in 2009.

== Illness ==
After Wilson developed renal cancer and had one kidney removed in 2007, doctors recommended he take the drug Sutent. Manchester Primary Care NHS Trust refused to fund the £3,500 per month cost of providing the drug, while patients being treated alongside him at the Christie Hospital and living just a few miles away in Cheshire did receive funding for the medication. A number of Wilson's music industry friends, including former Happy Mondays manager Nathan McGough, their current manager Elliot Rashman and TV stars Richard Madeley and Judy Finnegan, formed a fund to help pay for Wilson's medical treatment.

Wilson said:

This [Sutent] is my only real option. It is not a cure but can hold the cancer back, so I will probably be on it until I die. When they said I would have to pay £3,500 for the drugs each month, I thought where am I going to find the money? I'm the one person in this industry who famously has never made any money. I used to say "some people make money and some make history", which is very funny until you find you can't afford to keep yourself alive. I've never paid for private healthcare because I'm a socialist. Now I find you can get tummy tucks and cosmetic surgery on the NHS but not the drugs I need to stay alive. It is a scandal.

== Death and legacy ==
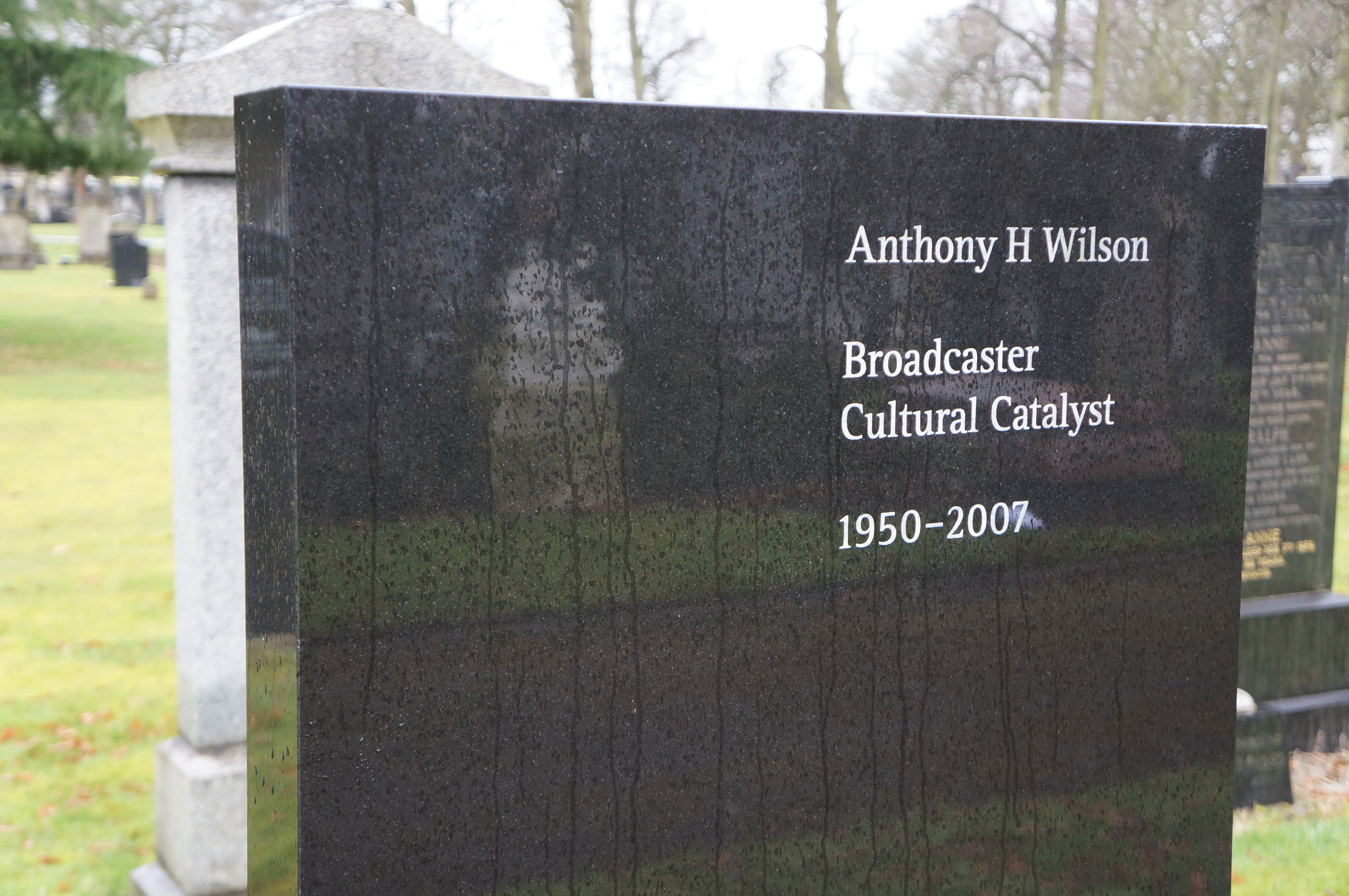
The top of Wilson's gravestone, designed by Peter Saville and Ben Kelly

In early 2007, emergency surgery was performed to remove one of Wilson's kidneys. This forced the postponement of plans to create a Southern Hemisphere version of the In the City festival. Despite the surgery, the cancer progressed and a course of chemotherapy was ineffective. Wilson died of a heart attack in Manchester's Christie Hospital on 10 August 2007 aged 57. Following the news of his death, the Union Flag on Manchester Town Hall was lowered to half mast as a mark of respect.

Probate documents reveal his estate was valued at £484,747 after tax. That figure includes the value of his city centre flat on Little Peter Street. The will, signed by Wilson on 4 July 2007, gave Yvette Livesey, 39, his girlfriend of 17 years, the proceeds from their home. He also left her his share of six businesses. His son Oliver and daughter Isabel shared the rest of his estate.

Wilson's funeral was at St Mary's RC Church, Mulberry Street, Manchester (The Hidden Gem) on 20 August 2007. Among the music, he chose Happy Mondays' "Bob's Yer Uncle". As with everything else in the Factory empire, Wilson's coffin was given a Factory catalogue number: FAC 501. He is buried at Southern Cemetery in Chorlton-cum-Hardy, Manchester. His black granite headstone, erected in October 2010, was designed by Peter Saville and Ben Kelly, and features a quotation, chosen by Wilson's family, from Mrs G. Linnaeus Banks's 1876 novel The Manchester Man, set in Rotis serif font. The quotation reads: "Mutability is the epitaph of worlds/ Change alone is changeless/ People drop out of the history of a life as of a land though their work or their influence remains."

The main square of the HOME/First Street development in Manchester, which opened in 2015, is named Tony Wilson Place.

In memory of Wilson, a poem was written by Mike Garry and broadcast on the BBC.
