= Vini Reilly =

English guitarist (born 1953)

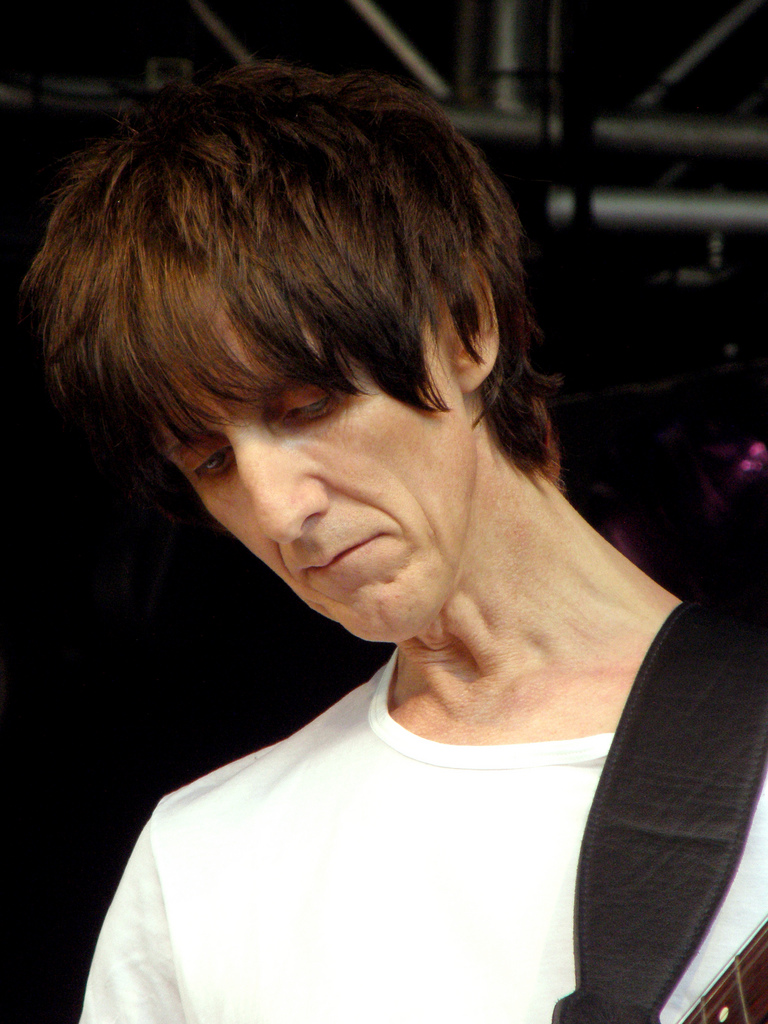
- Reilly in 2007

Background information
- Born: Vincent Gerrard Reilly; 4 August 1953 (age 72)
- Origin: Blackley, Manchester, England
- Genres: Post-punk, dream pop
- Instruments: Guitar, vocals, piano, bass
- Years active: 1978–present
- Labels: Factory, London, Artful, Kookydisc
- Member of: The Durutti Column
- Formerly of: Ed Banger and the Nosebleeds, BT, Holly Johnson, Pauline Murray and the Invisible Girls, Morrissey

Vincent Gerard "Vini" Reilly (born 4 August 1953) is an English musician and leader of the post-punk group the Durutti Column. He is known for his distinctively clean, fluid guitar style, which stood out from his punk-era contemporaries in its incorporation of jazz, folk, and classical elements. In addition to his work under that group, Reilly also collaborated with artists such as Morrissey, John Cooper Clarke, Pauline Murray, Anne Clark, and others.

== Biography ==
Reilly was born on 4 August 1953 in Higher Blackley, Manchester, and raised in Withington, Wythenshawe and Didsbury, Manchester. His father was an engineer who did not allow his five children to watch television. His father died when Vini was 16. He later lamented that he did not admire or know him enough. As a youngster, Reilly was a talented footballer. He was offered a trial for Manchester City F.C., but he declined, opting to concentrate on music.

His first recorded work was Ed Banger & The Nosebleeds' "Ain't Bin To No Music School".

Reilly was Tony Wilson's first signing to Factory Records in Manchester. Brian Eno cited Reilly's album LC as his all-time favourite album and Red Hot Chili Peppers' John Frusciante stated that Reilly was "the best guitarist in the world".

Reilly arranged music and played guitar on fellow Manchester artist Morrissey's first post-Smiths album Viva Hate (1988). Morrissey and Reilly have both been members of The Nosebleeds, but in different incarnations of the group. Reilly also recorded with artists including Anne Clark, The Wake, Richard Jobson, Quando Quango, Craig Davies, Swing Out Sister and Holly Johnson (on his 2014 album Europa).

In September 2010, Reilly had a "minor" stroke which made him lose "some feeling in his left hand". Despite this, in February 2011 it was reported that he was working on a new album. The new tracks are slower because, after the stroke, he could not play as fast as he used to. In January 2013, Reilly's nephew made an Internet appeal on his behalf for donations because the guitarist had debts for unpaid rent from the time between his strokes and his assessment for disability benefit. Fans sent £3,000 within a day and Reilly was reported to feel that their generosity had "lifted the weight of the world off his shoulders".
