= Uncle Dysfunktional =

Studio album by Happy Mondays
- Released: 2 July 2007
- Recorded: 2006
- Studios: The Studiosound, Rochdale; Make It Nice, Leicester; Moolah Rogue, Stockport
- Genre: Electro-funk
- Length: 54:58
- Label: Sequel Records
- Producer: Sunny Levine

Happy Mondays chronology
Yes Please! (1992)	Uncle Dysfunktional (2007)

Singles from Uncle Dysfunktional
- 1. "Jellybean" Released: 16 July 2007; 2. "Dysfunktional Uncle" Released: 29 October 2007

Uncle Dysfunktional is the fifth studio album by the English rock band Happy Mondays. It was released by Sequel Records on 2 July 2007. After the band reunited in 2004, they toured into 2005; by 2006, a new album was recorded with producer Sunny Levine. Initial sessions were held at The Studiosound in Rochdale and Make It Nice Studio in Leicester with Dave Parkinson, before moving to Moolah Rogue Studios in Stockport with Levine. Uncle Dysfunktional is an electro-funk record, with influences from country and hip-hop.

Uncle Dysfunktional received generally mixed reviews from music critics, some enjoyed it more than they expected to, while others found it to be uninspired and lacking direction. Its release was preceded by an appearance at Coachella Festival in the United States, and a two-month tour of the United Kingdom. "Jellybean" was released as the lead single from the album on 16 July 2007. Another UK tour followed, which led into an excursion to mainland Europe towards the end of the year. During this, a remix of "Dysfunktional Uncle" was released as the album's second single on 29 October 2007.

== Background and recording ==
Between 1987 and 1992, Happy Mondays released four studio albums – Squirrel and G-Man... (1987), Bummed (1988), Pills 'n' Thrills and Bellyaches (1990) and Yes Please! (1992) – through Factory Records and London Recordings. During this period, the band and the Stone Roses led the Madchester music scene; Happy Mondays mixed house music, soul guitar parts and 1960s psychedelia. Following the band's demise, frontman Shaun Ryder and dancer Bez formed Black Grape, with whom they released It's Great When You're Straight...Yeah (1995) and Stupid Stupid Stupid (1997). While touring in support of the latter, Black Grape broke up. Ryder decided to reform Happy Mondays in 1999, and toured throughout 2000. Ryder released his debut solo album Amateur Night in the Big Top (2003) to little success. He reunited Happy Mondays again in 2004, though with a line-up of him, Bez and drummer Gary Whelan.

Kavin Sandhu joined the band soon after; Ryder had met him while DJing. The new line-up toured throughout 2005, and released the single "Playground Superstar" in 2006. Happy Mondays' managers Eliot Rashman and Stuart Worthington suggested they should make a new album with Sunny Levine, the grandson of Quincy Jones and who they knew through Rashman. Legal issues, mostly stemming from former bassist Paul Ryder, prevented the band from recording a new album until mid-2006. The band's line-up by this point consisted of Ryder, Whelan, Bez, Sandhu, Mikey Shine, Julie Gordon and Dan Broad. Initial recordings and demos for the band's next album were recorded and engineered by Dave Parkinson at The Studiosound in Rochdale, and then at Make It Nice Studio in Leicester.

Steve Fenton then digitally transferred and engineered the material at Calder Recordings in Cragg Vale. Levine produced and engineered the final recordings at Moolah Rogue Studios in Stockport, with assistance from Seadna McPhail. Sandhu and Whelan worked with Levine during the day time, while he worked with Ryder during night sessions. Ryder said Whelan often complained about the production of the songs with Levine. Ryder estimated that he spent one day per track coming up with lyrics for them; Levine liked the majority of the lyrics Ryder wrote, and would tell him if a line did not work. Ryder compared this to how he would work with producer Danny Saber when he was in Black Grape. Sessions finished in August 2006, when Levine, Whelan and Broad prepared mixes; Howie B mixed the final recordings at Miloco Studios in Hoxton, with assistance from Ben Thackeray. Bernie Grundman then mastered the album at Bernie Grundman Mastering.

== Composition and lyrics ==
Musically, the sound of Uncle Dysfunktional has been described as electro-funk, with influences from country and hip-hop. Despite Ryder claiming he overcame a drug addiction, they remain a reoccurring topic throughout the songs. He said the album's overstatement was about being "middle-aged and becoming a boring old fart". Ryder said Levine's connections allowed them to bring in outside musicians who he was friends with to contribute to the recordings, including his father Stewart Levine, Ry Cooder and his son Joachim, Juliette Commagere of Hello Stranger, Paul Newsome of Proud Mary, multi-instrumentalist Robert Francis and singer Selema Masekela.

The opening track to Uncle Dysfunktional, the psychedelic "Jellybean", sees Ryder detailing an obsession with transgenderism over a baggy drum pattern and synth stabs. "Angels and Whores" is centred around a sample repeating "I'm a drug addicted alcoholic" and a wall of guitars. "Deviantz" featured vocals from rapper Mickey Avalon, who was a friend of Levine's. "Cuntry Disco" features a pedal steel guitar while Ryder details the state of his sinuses. "Anti Warhole (On the Dancefloor)" is an electronic Bhangra song, with samples of Andy Warhol and Commodore 64 noises. It was compared to Ryder's collaboration with Gorillaz, and "Lazyitis", the closer to Happy Mondays' second studio album Bummed (1989). "Rush Rush" is a cover of the Debbie Harry song of the same name; Happy Mondays' version touches on 1990s rave music. The closing track to Uncle Dysfunktional, "Somebody Else's Weather", sees Ryder talk about the weather.

== Release ==
On 26 March 2007, it was announced that Happy Mondays had signed to Sanctuary Records, and that their forthcoming album was scheduled for release in a few months' time. In April 2007, Happy Mondays appeared at the Coachella Festival in the United States, marking their first visit to the country in 15 years. As Bez was denied a visa, he did not perform with the band. Here, they debuted "Jellybean", "Angels and Whores", "Deviantz" with Avalon and "In the Blood". In May and June 2007, they embarked on a tour of the United Kingdom, concluding with a performance at the London Astoria. Happy Mondays were scheduled to the US to perform at the In the City festival, which was run by Factory Records founder Tony Wilson. However, due to visa issues, the band had to cancel their appearance. Between June and August 2007, the band played various festivals, including Electric Gardens, T on the Fringe and V, and a one-off show at The Ritz in Manchester.

Uncle Dysfunktional was released on 2 July 2007 through Sanctuary-imprint Sequel Records. Ryder said he could have put the album out under the Black Grape name as it "would have saved us loads of legal hassles - but because it was Gaz and Bez it just was the [Happy] Mondays". Despite Factory Records having closed 15 years before, Wilson personally assigned Uncle Dysfunktional a FAC catalogue number, FAC-500. "Jellybean" was released as the lead single from the album on 16 July 2007. In September and October 2007, they went on another UK tour, with support from the Sunshine Underground, which was followed by a trek to mainland Europe in November 2007. A music video was released for "Dysfunktional Uncle" on 22 October 2007. A version of the track, remixed by Eliot James was released the second single from the album on 29 October 2007. Happy Mondays closed out the year with a show at the G-Mex centre on 13 December 2007. The band then performed at the Versus Cancer benefit gig on 23 February 2008, followed by an appearance at the Wakestock festival later in the year. A 2020 mix of the album was released in December 2020, with a re-ordered track listing, and the addition of bonus track "Petunia". This version was pressed on vinyl as part of the 2022 Record Store Day event.

== Reception ==
Professional ratings
Aggregate scores
Source	Rating
Metacritic	57/100
Review scores
Source	Rating
AllMusic	3/5 stars
Cokemachineglow	39%
FOK!	4/5 stars
Laut.de	4/5 stars
MusicOMH	3.5/5 stars
NME	7/10
The Observer	3/5 stars
Ox-Fanzine	7/10
Stylus Magazine	D+
Yahoo! Music	5/10 stars

Uncle Dysfunktional was met with mixed reviews from music critics. At Metacritic, which assigns a normalized rating out of 100 to reviews from mainstream publications, the album received an average score of 57, based on eight reviews.

Jim Butler of The Observer said Ryder's "lascivious drawl and surreal wordplay remain intact" as songs such as "Anti Warhole (On the Dancefloor)" and "Dr Dick" "prov[e] that more than just goodwill currently propels Ryder's band of merry men". Ox-Fanzine reviewer Markus Kolodziej called the album "danceable", showcasing "limited [W.B.] Yeats-compatible [song] titles" with the likes of "Angel and Whores" and "Rats with Wings". musicOMH contributor Claire Simpson referred to the album as a "huge amount of fun", serving as a "reminder that it's great that the Happy Mondays have never completely disappeared". She stressed that it is "unlikely [... to] attract any new fans, but for the legions of loyal followers of Shaun and co, it will definitely satisfy." Stylus Magazine's Nick Southall noted that the album's first two songs retread the band's older sound, while other parts of the album "attempt to come to grips with more contemporary forms, but it’s less than convincing". Though he found it to be "far better than expected," it paled in comparison to the band's other releases. Raymond Rotten of OOR said halfway through the album the quality of the material starts dripping, but by its conclusion it "stays upright. And that's probably the maximum we can expect from a [...] reunion that lacks both the original bassist and guitarist".

Yahoo! Music's Niall O'Keeffe did not consider it a proper Happy Mondays album by virtue of excluding former members, such as guitarist Mark Day. He added that Ryder comes across as a "shadow of his former self", aside from the infrequent "strangely phrased lyrical gems". FOK! editor Rich wrote that despite only having three original members, Ryder, Bez and Whelan "managed to resuscitate the Happy Mondays in a dignified way with this album", though he could not "really call the music innovative". David M. Goldstein of Cokemachineglow said it "plods with an aimlessness", with the exception of "Jellybean". He added that if the listener tackled the album as "little more than an excuse for Shaun Ryder to head back out on the road, I guess it works fine". AllMusic reviewer Stephen Thomas Erlewine's first reaction is about the album's "really ugly, garish cover". He found the music to be "directionless", and stated that if Ryder was able to offer lyrics that "linger in the imagination," the album could have had "some longer staying power". NME writer Alex Miller said from the album's third track "Deviants", it "begins a slow decline into the most putrid of doldrums".

The Village Voice included "Jellybean" at number 34 on their 50 Worst Songs of the '00s list.

== Track listing ==
Writing credits per booklet. All recordings produced by Sunny Levine.

No.	Title	Writer(s)	Length
1.	"Jellybean"	Shaun Ryder; Gary Whelan; Kavin Sandhu; Dave Parkinson	5:51
2.	"Angels and Whores"	Ryder; Whelan; Sandhu; John Dunn; Mickey Westermann; Parkinson	3:30
3.	"Deviantz"	Ryder; Whelan; Sandhu	4:00
4.	"Rats with Wings"	Ryder; Whelan; Sandhu; Dunn; Westermann; Parkinson	4:26
5.	"Cuntry Disco"	Ryder; Whelan; Sandhu; Parkinson	3:47
6.	"In the Blood"	Ryder; Whelan; Sandhu; Dunn; Westermann; Parkinson	3:57
7.	"Anti Warhole (On the Dancefloor)"	Ryder; Whelan	4:08
8.	"Rush Rush" (Debbie Harry cover)	Harry; Giorgio Moroder	4:20
9.	"Dysfunktional Uncle"	Ryder; Whelan; Sandhu; Dunn; Westermann; Parkinson	4:00
10.	"Dr Dick"	Ryder; Whelan; Sandhu; Dunn; Westermann; Parkinson	4:09
11.	"Somebody Else's Weather"	Ryder; Whelan; Sandhu; Dunn; Westermann	4:44
12.	Untitled (silence; no audio)		3:20
13.	"0161'ers (Northern Soul Weekender)" (hidden track)		4:46
Total length:			54:58

== Personnel ==
Personnel per booklet.

Happy Mondays

- Shaun Ryder
- Gary Whelan
- Mark "Bez" Berry
- Kavin Sandhu
- Mikey Shine
- Julie Gordon
- Dan Broad

Production

- Sunny Levine – producer, engineer, additional mixdown assistance
- Seadna McPhail – assistant
- Howie B – mixing
- Ben Thackeray – assistant
- Gary Whelan – additional mixdown assistance
- Dan Broad – additional mixdown assistance
- Dave Parkinson – initial recording, demos
- Steve Fenton – digital transfer, engineer
- Bernie Grundman – mastering

Additional musicians

- Mickey Avalon
- Stewart Levine
- Johnny Evans
- Eamon Ryland
- Joachim Cooder
- Asa Soltan Rahmati
- Adam Burns
- Juliette Commagere
- Jared Smith
- Wayne Edwards
- Keith Ashworth
- Paul Newsome
- Norman McLeod
- Amir Yaghami
- Ry Cooder
- Robert Francis
- Selema Masekela
- Na'im Cortazzi
- Dave Parkinson

== See also ==
- Pop Voodoo – Black Grape's post-reunion album
