= Stupid Stupid Stupid =

Studio album by Black Grape
- Released: 10 November 1997
- Recorded: July–August 1997
- Studio: Real World (Bath); Westlake Audio (Los Angeles, California)
- Genre: Dance-rock
- Length: 45:03
- Label: Radioactive
- Producer: Danny Saber; John X Volaitis; Shaun Ryder; Stephen Lironi

Black Grape chronology
| It's Great When You're Straight...Yeah (1995) | Stupid Stupid Stupid (1997) | Pop Voodoo (2017) |

Singles from Stupid Stupid Stupid
- 1. "Get Higher" Released: 20 October 1997; 2. "Dadi Waz a Badi" Released: 1997; 3. "Marbles" Released: 23 February 1998

Stupid Stupid Stupid is the second studio album by the English rock band Black Grape, released on 10 November 1997 through Radioactive Records. While touring in support of their debut studio album It's Great When You're Straight...Yeah (1995), vocalist Paul "Kermit" Leveridge was diagnosed with sepsis. Carl "Psycho" McCarthy temporarily filled in Kermit's role before being added to the line-up permanently. Though he was too ill to tour, Kermit joined the band in Hollywood to work on songs for their next album, which continued throughout 1996. They recorded their second album at Real World Studios in Bath and Westlake Audio in Los Angeles, California, over eight weeks with Danny Saber, John X Volaitis, and frontman Shaun Ryder as producers. Stupid Stupid Stupid is a dance-rock album that continues the party atmosphere of It's Great When You're Straight...Yeah while toning down that album's religious references.

Stupid Stupid Stupid received mixed reviews from music critics, some of whom saw it as a continuation of It's Great When You're Straight...Yeah, while others found it to be an inferior version of that album. It peaked at number 11 in the UK, as well as charting highly in Scotland and Sweden. It would be certified gold in the UK within a few months of release. With an appearance at the Phoenix Festival, Saber was made a member of Black Grape. "Get Higher" was released as the lead single from Stupid Stupid Stupid on 20 October 1997, reaching number 12 in Scotland and number 24 in the UK. It was followed by the European-only second single, "Dadi Waz a Badi". Following a fight prior to a show, Ryder fired the rest of the band; future touring plans were subsequently cancelled. "Marbles" was released as the album's third single on 23 February 1998, sitting outside of the top 40 in Scotland and the UK. By July 1998, Ryder said he would no longer be recording under the Black Grape name.

== Background ==
Black Grape released their debut studio album, It's Great When You're Straight...Yeah, in August 1995. It topped the UK Album Chart for two months and was eventually certified platinum. All three of its singles – "Reverend Black Grape", "In the Name of the Father", and "Kelly's Heroes" – reached the top 20 in the UK, with "In the Name of the Father" peaking the highest at number 8. After flying back to the United Kingdom after a show, vocalist Paul "Kermit" Leveridge fell ill and was subsequently diagnosed with sepsis. In early 1996, the band embarked on a UK tour, with Carl "Psycho" McCarthy covering Kermit's role. At the tour's conclusion, he joined the band on a permanent basis. Dancer Bez left the band over disagreements with finances with the band's label, Radioactive Records. Kermit was in a stable condition to help record "England's Irie", a song intended to promote the Euro 1996 football league. Black Grape then toured across the United States and South America with Psycho; Kermit had to miss the trek as a result of a lung infection.

Despite Kermit being too ill to tour, he flew to the US in May 1996; he, frontman Shaun Ryder, and producer Danny Saber worked on some new songs in a rented house in Hollywood. The band released the non-album single "Fat Neck" in May 1996, which peaked at number ten in the UK. Around it, they supported Oasis for two shows and headlined Tribal Gathering. The following month, Ryder fired their management team, Nicholl and Dime, on the grounds that they were trying to extort money out of him. He tried to find a new manager, being in contact with Nirvana associate Danny Goldberg and Henry Rollins contactee Richard Bishop, eventually going with Bishop's management company, 3AM. Kermit and Psycho meanwhile hired the company Hot Soup, which consisted of their touring manager Tony Murray and Ryder's father, to manage the pair. "England's Irie" was released as another non-album single that same month, peaking at number six in the UK. They headlined the Saturday date of the Reading Festival. Throughout the year, the band spent three separate fortnight-long sessions at the rented Hollywood residence to write material for their next album, with the last occurring in December 1996. They demoed 15 tracks in total while there.

== Production ==
Ryder did not want to rush into recording their next album, preferring to take a slow-paced approach to it. In the meantime, Saber occupied himself working on Bridges to Babylon (1997) by the Rolling Stones, as well as remix tracks by the likes of David Bowie and U2. Ryder decided to take a break, purchasing a house outside of Cork, Ireland. Black Grape recorded their new album over the course of eight weeks in July and August 1997. In the midst of recording, Ryder was busy filming scenes for The Avengers (1998); they were accompanied by live member and keyboardist Martin Slattery. Sessions were held at Real World Studios in Bath and Westlake Audio in Los Angeles, California, with Saber, John X Volaitis, and Ryder as producers. "Dadi Waz a Badi" had the extra credit of also being produced by It's Great When You're Straight...Yeah producer Stephen Lironi.

Around this time, Kermit and Psycho were focused on trying to get their side project Manmade started; Ryder theorised that people had told the pair that they did not need him to be successful. Ryder and Saber would often be sitting in the studio waiting for Kermit and Psycho to show up, who were recording for Manmade instead of for Black Grape. Ryder's frustration about the situation extended to Murray, saying he had a conflict of interest with the pair. Ryder wanted to continue the party atmosphere from their debut, but felt this was unattainable as the collaborative nature of that album was not present while making the new one. He went as far as to compare it to the making of his previous band Happy Mondays' fourth studio album Yes Please! (1992): "The band was splintering and the music really suffered because of it". Volaitis served as the main engineer, with assistance from Marco Milgliari, who was an additional engineer alongside Phil Ault, Ewan Davis, and Saber. Saber claimed that Ryder would record as many as 20 tracks of his vocals for every song on the album. Tom Lord-Alge, with assistance from Mauricio Iragorri, mixed the recordings at South Beach Studios in Miami, Florida, and Encore Studios in Los Angeles. Ted Jensen then mastered the album at Sterling Sound in New York.

== Composition and lyrics ==
Musically, the sound of Stupid Stupid Stupid has been described as dance-rock, with influence from soul. Author Lisa Verrico wrote in her book High Life 'N' Low Down Dirty: The Thrills and Spills of Shaun Ryder that the album melded together "P-funk, soul, hip hop, rock and drum'n'bass beats with a buoyant brass section, bongos, scratching and the usual smattering of musical steals". It retained the party atmosphere of It's Great When You're Straight...Yeah; it lacked the religious references of that album, with Ryder claiming he put more effort into the lyrics for Stupid Stupid Stupid. The title was taken from an occasion where the band was performing "Reverend Black Grape" on TV and had to change the lyric "talking bullshit... bullshit... bullshit" to "talking stupid... stupid... stupid". All of the tracks were credited to Ryder, Saber, and Manmade, except "Lonely", by Posie Knight and Jerry Weaver.

"Get Higher" is about Ryder's drug consumption; its intro consists of spliced speeches of former US president Ronald Reagan, making him sound like he is discussing drug use. It was taken from "Just Say No", a TV campaign from the 1980s where Reagan and his wife Nancy warned against marijuana usage. Ryder said he had "ripped [off] a bit" of "Reach for Love" (1984) by Marcel King for "Get Higher" in the hopes that listeners would "go back and discover the original". "Squeaky" is about safe sex; its music is a cross between the sound of Led Zeppelin and baggy, with record scratches and duck noises. "Marbles" is a trip hop and electronic house track that was compared to the work of Happy Mondays and continued the vocal sparring found on Black Grape's debut. "Dadi Waz a Badi" is about having bad parents as role models and Ryder pondering whether he is a good father. Both it and "Marbles" recalled the sound of Happy Mondays' third studio album, Pills 'n' Thrills and Bellyaches (1990).

"Rubberband" is a guitar-focused rock song with heavy bass parts, topped by Ryder's distorted voice being run through a flange pedal. It channels the sound of "Devils Haircut" (1996) by Beck and lifts the guitar part from the Pills 'n' Thrills and Bellyaches opening track, "Kinky Afro". "Spotlight" includes a musical tribute to Phil Lynott and is the only track on the album not to feature vocals from Kermit. "Tell Me Something" is a drum and bass track with Latin music flourishes and borrows elements of "Fools Gold" (1989) by the Stone Roses and the psychedelic work of the Byrds. "Money Back Guaranteed" is a series of toilet jokes. "Lonely" is a cover of the Frederick Knight track "I've Been Lonely for So Long (1972); Black Grape's version of the track was compared to Exile on Main St. (1972)-era Rolling Stones. They decided to do a version of it after listening to its respective album, I've Been Lonely for So Long (1972), while in the studio. The album concludes with the Latin funk of "Words".

== Release ==
Black Grape played their first show in 1997, performing at the Phoenix Festival, which marked the introduction of Saber as a member of the band. In August 1997, the band's documentary, The Grape Tapes, premiered at the Edinburgh Film Festival. It was directed by Tom Bruggen, who originally wanted to make a documentary on Happy Mondays; as that band broke up, Bruggen filmed the formation of Black Grape. "Get Higher" was released as the album's lead single on 20 October 1997; this version omitted the audio clip of Reagan. Two versions were released on CD: the first with remixes of "Get Higher" and a live version of "Rubberband", while the second included remixes of "Rubberband" and the music video for "Get Higher". Stupid Stupid Stupid was released on 10 November 1997, after initially being scheduled for October 1997. Ryder said the album's artwork received criticism from some people in the US as the golliwog doll depicted with googly eyes came across as a racist stereotype, to which he responded: "We had two black kids in the band, Kermit and Psycho, who hadn't even thought anything of it".

In November and December 1997, Black Grape embarked on a UK tour titled The Get Higher Tour, with support from Dust Junkys. "Dadi Waz a Badi" was released as a single exclusively in Europe, with a live version of "Rubberband" as its B-side. Prior to a concert in Doncaster on 7 December 1997, Ryder reportedly fired the rest of the band. It came after a fight between the members and resulted in a previously scheduled New Year's Eve show at Alexandra Palace in London. Representatives on behalf of the band said Ryder was dealing with "nervous exhaustion" as a result of filming The Avengers. They added that they were attempting to have a meeting for the members to sort out their issues. Plans for a music video for their next single, as well as tours of Australia and Japan in early 1998, were cancelled due to the uncertainty of the band's status. In late December 1997, it was confirmed that Kermit departed to focus on Manmade; by January 1998, Psycho was also confirmed to have left Black Grape. Ryder claimed a "power play" between Murray and 3AM was the reason for Kermit and Psycho leaving. Ryder also mentioned that Psycho had developed an ego due to the success of Black Grape.

"Marbles" was released as the album's third single on 23 February 1998. Two versions were released on CD: the first with a radio edit, remixes, and a demo of "Marbles", while the second featured "Harry the Dog", a remix of "Marbles", and an uncensored music video for "Get Higher". After initially being planned for release on 27 January 1998, Stupid Stupid Stupid was eventually released in the US on 24 February 1998. Additional tours of Europe and the US were in the planning stages, though these were also cancelled, including an appearance at Glastonbury Festival. A representative for Ryder said these cancellations were due to Ryder wanting to make a feature film with Bruggen. In July 1998, Ryder said he would no longer be performing shows or recording new music under the Black Grape moniker.

== Reception ==
Professional ratings
Review scores
| Source | Rating |
|---|---|
| AllMusic | 3/5 stars |
| The Daily News | B |
| Entertainment Weekly | C+ |
| Jornal do Brasil | 4/5 stars |
| NME | 6/10 |
| Pitchfork | 6.9/10 |
| Pittsburgh Post-Gazette | 3/5 stars |
| Rolling Stone | 2.5/5 stars |
| Spin | 6/10 |
| Wall of Sound | 55/100 |

Stupid Stupid Stupid was met with mixed reviews from music critics. It is often considered to be similar to the band's debut album, but without that album's "infectious beats, mammoth hooks, and surreal humour." The Daily News's Michael Mehle wrote that it went "a long way toward streamlining [the sound of their debut] for American audiences", highlighting the "rap influences" and "thick, high-impact dance tracks". Author Dave Thompson, in his book Alternative Rock (2000), wrote that it was "more focused" than the first time, with the band "refin[ing] their sound down into a powerful funkadelic hybrid ..." MTV reviewer Lily Moayeri said it followed their debut with "[w]ell-rounded grooves, funky hip-hop rhythms, and soulful vocal offerings with an inherent sense of humor". Ed Masley of the Pittsburgh Post-Gazette saw it as a "musical trainwreck of breakbeats, samples, loops and sky-high Wonderwalls of rock guitar". CMJ New Music Monthly writer Andrew Beaujon called it "one hell of a funky document", adding that the "party-in-the-studio patina" that Ryder has been attempting since Happy Mondays was "now fully realized".

Silvio Essinger of Jornal do Brasil considered it "mind-numbing – it has [a] hypnotic swing" that is fronted by "damaged soul, drunken funk and a lot of psychedelicism, all in one puff". Richard T. Thurston of Ink 19 saw it as akin to Oasis' works and called it a "ballsy hybrid of dance and rock that is ripe for young ears." Brent DiCrescenzo of Pitchfork described it as "[l]oud, obnoxious, and perfect for the setting." Entertainment Weekly contributor Mark Bautz saw it as a "lackadaisical effort that verges on dullness" since the majority of the tracks are "so indistinguishable that the disc rapidly descends from a lively groove into a familiar rut." NME's Steve Sutherland called it "a calculatedly offensive gesture almost beautiful in the perfection of its simplicity." The Independent writer Andy Gill thought that it "simply doesn't move like it should", with "no twitch to its funk." He summarised it as being "[m]ore dumbed-down than drugged-up."

Eric Weisbard of Spin thought that the "tunes are almost an afterthought this time", signalling that "Dadi Waz a Badi" and "Tell Me Something" were the only songs that "capture the manic pop thrill" of their debut. Wall of Sound's Daniel Durchholz echoed a similar statement, calling it "disconcertingly unfocused and pleasing only in dribs and drabs". Johnny Walker of MTV felt that Saber's "ace production and arsenal of instrumental touches" are not able to hide that the album "doesn't pack the punch of the band's debut". He added that the "insistence here on repeating simplistic choruses ad infinitum start to grate after a while". In a review for Rolling Stone, journalist Greg Kot said that the band "don't quite squeeze out the same head-spinning elixir" as their debut. In a dismissive review from E! Online, the staff there remarked that despite the band's lack of songwriting, it "doesn't stop 'em from making CDs", referring to it as "boring and repetitive".

Stupid Stupid Stupid peaked at number 11 in the UK and was certified gold by the British Phonographic Industry within a few months. It also charted at number 10 in Scotland and number 40 in Sweden. "Get Higher" reached number 12 in Scotland and number 24 in the UK. "Marbles" reached number 44 in Scotland and number 46 in the UK. The Pittsburgh Post-Gazette ranked Stupid Stupid Stupid as the 8th best album of 1998.

== Track listing ==
All songs written by Shaun Ryder, Danny Saber, and Manmade, except "Lonely" by Posie Knight and Jerry Weaver. All tracks produced by Saber, John X Volaitis, and Ryder, except "Dadi Waz a Badi" by those three and Stephen Lironi.

1. "Get Higher" – 5:00
2. "Squeaky" – 5:16
3. "Marbles" – 4:24
4. "Dadi Waz a Badi" – 4:01
5. "Rubberband" – 4:36
6. "Spotlight" – 3:51
7. "Tell Me Something" – 3:47
8. "Money Back Guaranteed" – 5:17
9. "Lonely" (Frederick Knight cover) – 4:02
10. "Words" – 4:42

== Personnel ==
Personnel per booklet.

Black Grape

- Shaun Ryder – vocals
- Paul "Kermit" Leveridge – vocals (all except track 6)
- Carl "Psycho" McCarthy – vocals (all except tracks 5 and 6)
- Danny Saber – horn arrangements, programming, bass, guitar, clavinet (tracks 2 and 4), Hammond B-3 (tracks 3 and 6–8), Rhodes (tracks 3, 6–8, and 10), piano (track 5), sitar (track 7), harmonica (track 8), vocoder (track 10)
- Paul "Wags" Wagstaff – electric guitar (all except tracks 3, 5, and 9), guitar (track 9)
- Ged Lynch – percussion, drums (tracks 2 and 5–9)
- Martin Slattery – horn arrangements, electric piano (track 2), flute (tracks 2 and 8), saxophone (tracks 3, 4, 6, and 9), Hammond B-3 (tracks 4 and 9), Rhodes (track 9)

Additional musicians

- John X Volaitis – harmonica (track 3)
- Neil Yates – trumpet (tracks 3, 6, 9, and 10), theremin (track 6)
- Nat Colman – trombone (tracks 3, 6, and 9)
- Stephen Lironi – electric guitar (track 4)

Production and design

- John X Volaitis – engineer, producer
- Marco Milgliari – engineer assistant, additional engineer
- Phil Ault – additional engineer
- Ewan Davis – additional engineer
- Danny Saber – additional engineer, producer
- Tom Lord-Alge – mixing
- Mauricio Iragorri – mixing assistant
- Shaun Ryder – producer
- Stephen Lironi – producer (track 4)
- Ted Jensen – mastering

== Charts and certifications ==
Chart performance for Stupid Stupid Stupid
| Chart (1997) | Peak position |
|---|---|
| Australian Albums (ARIA) | 139 |
| Scottish Albums (OCC) | 10 |
| Swedish Albums (Sverigetopplistan) | 40 |
| UK Albums (OCC) | 11 |

=== Certifications ===
Certifications for Stupid Stupid Stupid
| Region | Certification | Certified units/sales |
|---|---|---|
| United Kingdom (BPI) | Gold | 100,000^{^} |
^{^} Shipments figures based on certification alone.

== See also ==
- Amateur Night in the Big Top – Ryder's next project after Black Grape's demise
