= Pop Voodoo =

Studio album by Black Grape
- Released: 4 August 2017
- Recorded: September 2016
- Studio: Martin "Youth" Glover's residential studio, Sierra Nevada, Spain
- Genre: Funk; pop; trip hop
- Length: 50:31
- Label: UMC
- Producer: Youth

Black Grape chronology
Stupid Stupid Stupid (1997)	Pop Voodoo (2017)	Orange Head (2024)

Singles from Pop Voodoo
- 1. "Nine Lives" Released: 9 June 2017; 2. "I Wanna Be Like You" Released: 7 July 2017

Pop Voodoo is the third studio album of the British band Black Grape that was released on 4 August 2017 through UMC. After a one-off show in 2010, Black Grape reunited in April 2015 to play a show; at this time, Alan McGee was the band's manager. Following a tour of the United Kingdom and a collaboration with Paul Oakenfold, Black Grape worked on ideas for new songs. In September 2016, the band travelled to Spain, initially as a writing trip, during which they recorded sessions for their next album. Pop Voodoo was recorded at Martin "Youth" Glover's residential studio in Sierra Nevada, Spain, and in London. Pop Voodoo is a funk, pop and trip hop album on which Youth, alongside session musicians, plays many instruments.

Music critics gave Pop Voodoo generally favourable reviews, many of which praised frontman Shaun Ryder's lyricism, the upbeat music and Youth's production work. The album charted and peaked at number fifteen in the UK Album Chart and at number eight in the Scottish Albums Chart. After Black Grape supported Richard Ashcroft on his UK tour, "Nine Lives" was released as the lead single from the album in June 2017. The following month, "I Wanna Be Like You" was released as the album's second single, ahead of the band's performances at music festivals, such as Splendour in Nottingham and Rock Against Racism. In late 2018, after a performance at Star Shaped Festival, the band toured the UK.

== Background and development ==
Following the breakup of Happy Mondays, frontman Shaun Ryder formed Black Grape with Paul "Kermit" Leveridge; they released two studio albums; It's Great When You're Straight...Yeah (1995) and Stupid Stupid Stupid (1997). Black Grape split up in 1998; Ryder reformed Happy Mondays, who later released their fifth studio album Uncle Dysfunktional (2007). Around 2009, Ryder considered reuniting Black Grape and performed one show in 2010 with drum and bass musician Tom Piper covering Kermit's parts. Leveridge did not participate because of personal issues, including his heart surgery and his mother's Alzheimer's disease. Ryder said no further plans had been made because Black Grape's management had no interest in continuing with the band.

Veronica Gretton, former head of the band's previous label Radioactive Records, had emailed Ryder to tell him about the upcoming 20th anniversary of It's Great When You're Straight...Yeah. In 2015, after a discussion with his wife and the contact from Gretton, Ryder decided to contact Leveridge about reviving Black Grape, about which Leveridge was enthusiastic. In April that year, this version of the band played their first show in several years at Granada Studios in Manchester. By this time, Alan McGee, formerly the head of Creation Records, became the manager of both Black Grape and Happy Mondays. Ryder and Leveridge toured the UK as Black Grape in June and July 2015. Happy Mondays had planned to work on another album but progressed slowly due to differences of opinion between members, and two of them were living in North America.

== Writing and recording ==
In May 2016, NME reported that Black Grape were expected to be making a new album shortly. The following month, Leveridge and Ryder collaborated with DJs Paul Oakenfold and Goldie under the name Four Lions to release "We Are England", a football song to tie in with UEFA Euro 2016. During production of the track, Ryder and Leveridge worked on ideas for new material. In September 2016, they travelled to Spain, where they had planned to write new material for two weeks. During this trip, they spent four weeks recording and mixing a new album with producer Martin "Youth" Glover. Black Grape spent ten days at Youth's residential studio in Sierra Nevada, Spain, and the rest of the time was spent completing it in London. When McGee suggested using Youth to produce the album, Ryder was excited but Leveridge was not aware of him, prompting Ryder to name acts with whom Youth had worked, such as Edwyn Collins and The Verve. Michael Rendall, who was assisted by Jamie Grashion and Luke Fitzpatrick, recorded the sessions.

Ryder told Youth they wanted to mix the styles of The Beach Boys, Bee Gees and Ghetto Boys. He said Leveridge, Youth and he showed one another music they had not heard before, which influenced the album. Ryder said Youth pushed him and Leveridge out of their comfort zone, performing backing vocals, which Ryder typically did not do. Youth programmed and played Fender VI bass and guitar; Rendall also did programming, and played guitar and keyboards. Session musicians added extra instrumentation; Seth Leppard (guitar), Alex Ward (saxophone), Jamie Grashion (programming and guitar), Rainbow Man (harmonica) and Jackson Scott (acoustic guitar). Youth mixed the album, which Mike Marsh mastered at The Exchange in Exmouth, Devon.

== Composition and lyrics ==
Musically, the sound of Pop Voodoo has been described as funk, pop and trip hop. Discussing the music, Under the Radar writer Lily Moayeri said: "Fluid grooves and flirty funk interludes lace the Motown vibes and big band elements while baggy beats take dips into jazz and lounge territory". AllMusic reviewer Stephen Thomas Erlewine said Ryder "reverts to his old loves: '70s soul and disco, big beats and psychedelics, word games and singsong melodies". Nathan Westley of The Line of Best Fit found it to have "enough nods to Ryder's past [...] to suggest he hasn’t fully escaped the hard partying lifestyle that helped define his most beloved work". Ryder said they wanted to avoid mentioning God in the album's lyrics, as this had appeared in several of the songs on It's Great When You're Straight...Yeah. While Kermit would have his parts structured out on paper, Ryder would write random bits and work from that. When in the studio, Ryder said the pair would "sit face to face with each other, bouncing ideas off" one another. From here, they would have a song playing and ad-lib a part as it came to them. In his book How to Be a Rock Star (2021), Ryder regarded the album as the "proper Black Grape second album [...] the album that Stupid Stupid Stupid could have been".

The atmosphere of the album's opening track, "Everything You Know Is Wrong – Intro", was compared to the early work of De La Soul. A majority of the track was done by Youth after he had secretly taped Kermit and Ryder discussing American politics and Trump. Ryder said it was intended to be a skit that introduces the proceedings, akin to a hip-hop album. It sees Ryder tackle the 2016 elections in the United States, as well as the Donald Trump administration. A comedian was employed to impersonate Trump's voice as Ryder said they would not be allowed to use his actual voice. It also includes a reference to the Hillary Clinton email controversy, with the noise of a dial-up modem connecting to the internet heard after it. The horn-laden "Nine Lives" is followed by "Set the Grass on Fire", a brass-enhanced track that touches on ska during the verse sections, recalling the work of Smash Mouth. The latter uses samples from "Waiting for My Baby" (1976) by De Franks and His Professionals.

"Whiskey, Wine and Ham" evoked "Summertime" (1991) by DJ Jazzy Jeff & the Fresh Prince; it features a beat similar to the one heard in "Funky Drummer" (1970) by James Brown, alongside an electric piano and samples of woodwind instruments. "Money Burns" is an electro-funk and trip-hop track that recalls Pills 'n' Thrills and Bellyaches (1990)-era Happy Mondays. "String Theory" includes a banjo, and was reminiscent of "Reverend Black Grape" (1995) from their debut with its guitar and harmonica work. "Pop Voodoo" uses samples of "Ngyegye No So" by African Brothers Band. "I Wanna Be Like You" talks about a 74-year-old man who continues to smoke weed. "Sugar Money" has doo-wop-esque backing vocals, while "Shame" is a funk song that Westley said has "snappy disco basslines collide [that] with dance rhythms". "Losing Sleep" was compared to "Loose Fit" by Happy Mondays. Jim Gilchrist of The Scotsman wrote that "Young and Dumb", the album's closing track, was a "dubby clubland odyssey about the chemical highs and the comedown lows". Ryder said one of the track's recurring lines, "young, dumb and full of cum", was included as they wished to make a tribute to the work of Bushwick Bill.

== Release ==
McGee and the staff at Universal thought they would deliver an average album but Ryder said they were "blown away" after they heard the finished version. Black Grape embarked on a celebratory tour for the 21st anniversary of It's Great When You're Straight... Yeah in November and December 2016. In April 2017, the band supported Richard Ashcroft on his headlining UK arena tour. On 4 May 2017, Pop Voodoo was announced for release later that year and "Everything You Know Is Wrong – Intro" was made available for streaming. Four days later, Black Grape played a one-off show at the 100 Club in London. Keyboardist Dan Broad and guitarist Mikey Shine, both of whom had been working with Happy Mondays since the early 2000s, aided Black Grape's live set. On 17 May 2017, a music video for "Pop Voodoo" was released. "Nine Lives" was released as the lead single on 9 June 2017. The following month, Black Grape played a one-off show at Brixton Academy in London. "I Wanna Be Like You" was released as the second single from the album on 7 July 2017. Four days later, an animated lyric video for the song premiered through Clash's website.

Following this, Black Grape performed at the music festivals Splendour in Nottingham, Hope & Glory and Moovin. Pop Voodoo was originally scheduled for release through UMC on 7 July 2017 but the release was postponed to 4 August that year. Jon Gray designed the album's cover artwork; in his book Drawn to Type: Lettering for Illustrators, author Marty Blake called Gray's artwork "raw, compared to the whiff of elegance" of his other pieces, describing it in the style of Jean-Michel Basquiat. The word "pop" appears as eyes and a nose, while the word "voodoo" is laid over a mouth, resembling teeth. At the end of August, Black Grape played at Rock Against Racism in Govanhill, Scotland. Ryder returned to Happy Mondays for a greatest hits tour to end the year; as they took a break from live performances, Ryder spent the next two years focusing on Black Grape. Black Grape performed at Star Shaped Festival in September 2018 and toured the UK in November that year.

== Reception ==
Professional ratings
Aggregate scores
Source	Rating
AnyDecentMusic?	6.1/10
Metacritic	70/100
Review scores
Source	Rating
AllMusic	3.5 /5 stars
The Arts Desk	3 /5 stars
Classic Rock	3.5 /5 stars
Evening Standard	3 /5 stars
The Independent	3 /5 stars
The Irish Times	3 /5 stars
The Line of Best Fit	6.5/10
musicOMH	3.5 /5 stars
PopMatters	7/10
Under the Radar	7/10

Music critics gave Pop Voodoo generally favourable reviews. At Metacritic, the album received an average score of 70, based on ten reviews. AnyDecentMusic? gave it an average score of 6.1, based on 13 reviews.

According to Stephen Thomas Erlewine of Allmusic.com, Ryder's lyrics on Pop Voodoo are "alternately provocative and embarrassing". Paul Moody of Classic Rock wrote Ryder "remains in a league of his own" in terms of his lyricism. Moody said the album's "slapdash feel" only fails when the band "go off-piste," such as on "the brass-laden skank of the title track". MusicOMH contributor Graeme Marsh said apart from the "at times, laughable spiel spat by Ryder, there is one over-riding conclusion to take from Pop Voodoo – it is irrefutably 'catchy as fuck', as Ryder himself would no doubt say". The Independent's head critic Andy Gill said Ryder's "best lyrics here accompany the best grooves", highlighting "Whiskey, Wine and Ham" as an example. Evening Standard's Andre Paine wrote after the opening track, Ryder "gradually rediscovers Black Grape’s unruly groove and seamy, surreal wordplay". Paine also said Ryder was "some way off the height of his powers yet he remains a uniquely entertaining pop poet". Westley said Ryder's "ever-present lyrical wit is as sharp as it has ever been, but alas ultimately this album never matches his creative heights". April Clare Welsh of Crack magazine said Ryder's words frequently "descend into absurdist territory". Financial Times writer Ludovic Hunter-Tilney was disappointed in the lyrics because Ryder's "stream-of-consciousness verses were once a kind of bizarre street poetry but here they grow increasingly lacklustre".

According to Westley, Pop Voodoo has an "eminent celebratory spirit that lies at the centre of Black Grape's music, so it’s not surprising that the majority of this album is upbeat in nature". The Irish Times writer Lauren Murphy said the "most surprising thing is that there are some half-decent (albeit unprogressive) songs here" but when "all is said and done, the voodoo here is negligible". PopMatters' John Garratt said Pop Voodoo is an improvement over Black Grape's previous album and Happy Mondays' last, praising Pop Voodoo as "12 solid grooves that drizzle the extra treats on top like a confection: not necessary, but nice to have!" The Arts Desk writer Guy Oddy said while it does not match the quality of band's 1990s work, Pop Voodoo is "considerably better than might be expected". He said though it can feel a "bit loose at times", the album is "nothing but groovy vibes throughout, even if it does sometimes lack the heft of a proper backing band". In a review for The Sunday Times, Lisa Verrico said many of the tracks would "work well live – surely the point? – but some of the song ideas are stretched to breaking point".

According to Matthew Shaw of Louder Than War, Pop Voodoo is one of "Youth's best production jobs" to date because the mix is "complex, fresh and full of sonic depth". Gill wrote Youth helped "restore some of the verve and panache of Black Grape’s glorious debut album". Erlewine praised Youth for "burying Ryder in the mix, using his voice as just another aural element" because "it keeps the focus firmly on brightly dense rhythms". Moayeri said Rendall and Youth "should be credited with how well the superb compositions on Pop Voodoo flow", and according to Jochen Overbeck of Musikexpress: "Youth gives the whole thing some pop nuances that Black Grape hasn't seen before". Laut.de's Michael Schuh praised Youth for meticulously making "sure that no new-fangled nonsense like trap or dubstep ends up on the record and thus makes the nostalgia performance perfect". Verrico said Youth "attempted to keep their naughty-schoolboy side in check", which he "mostly manages by swathing Shaun Ryder’s rants and Kermit’s raps in funky brass and good-time grooves".

Pop Voodoo charted and peaked at number eight in Scottish Albums Chart, and at number fifteen in the UK Album Chart.

== Track listing ==
All songs written by Shaun Ryder, Paul Leveridge and Martin Glover.

No.	Title	Length
1.	"Everything You Know Is Wrong – Intro"	4:30
2.	"Nine Lives"	4:22
3.	"Set the Grass on Fire"	3:18
4.	"Whiskey, Wine and Ham"	3:45
5.	"Money Burns"	5:22
6.	"String Theory"	3:16
7.	"Pop Voodoo"	4:25
8.	"I Wanna Be Like You"	4:04
9.	"Sugar Money"	4:31
10.	"Shame"	4:29
11.	"Losing Sleep"	3:35
12.	"Young and Dumb"	4:54

== Personnel ==
Personnel per booklet.

Black Grape

- Shaun Ryder – vocals
- Paul "Kermit" Leveridge – vocals

Additional musicians

- Martin "Youth" Glover – programming, Fender VI bass, guitar
- Michael Rendall – keyboards, guitar, programming
- Seth Leppard – guitar
- Alex Ward – saxophone
- Jamie Grashion – programming, guitar
- Rainbow Man – harmonica
- Jackson Scott – acoustic guitar

Production and design

- Youth – producer, mixing
- Michael Rendall – recording, mixing, additional production
- Jamie Grashion – assistant engineer
- Luke Fitzpatrick – assistant engineer
- Mike Marsh – mastering
- Jon Gray – illustration
- Estuary English – design

== Charts ==
Chart performance for Pop Voodoo
Chart (2017)	Peak position
UK Albums (OCC)	15
Scottish Albums (OCC)	8
