= It's Great When You're Straight...Yeah =

Studio album by Black Grape
- Released: 7 August 1995
- Recorded: Late 1994 – early 1995
- Studios: Rockfield (Wales); Chapel (Lincolnshire); Boundary Row (London)
- Genres: Dance-pop; pop funk
- Length: 46:16
- Label: Radioactive
- Producers: Danny Saber; Stephen Lironi; Shaun Ryder

Black Grape chronology
It's Great When You're Straight...Yeah (1995)	Stupid Stupid Stupid (1997)

Singles from It's Great When You're Straight...Yeah
- 1. "Reverend Black Grape" Released: May 1995; 2. "In the Name of the Father" Released: July 1995; 3. "Kelly's Heroes" Released: March 1996

It's Great When You're Straight...Yeah is the debut studio album by the English alternative dance band Black Grape, released on 7 August 1995 through Radioactive Records. Following the breakup of Happy Mondays, frontman Shaun Ryder formed Black Grape with vocalist Paul "Kermit" Leveridge and dancer Bez. They were put in contact with management company Nicholl and Dime, who secured the band a recording contract with Radioactive Records. After demos and the band finalizing their line-up, Ryder met with producers Stephen Lironi and Danny Saber. Black Grape recorded their debut studio album in late 1994 and early 1995 at Rockfield Studios in Wales, Chapel Studios in Lincolnshire, and Boundary Row in London. It's Great When You're Straight...Yeah is a dance-pop and pop funk album, with the word "straight" in its title referring to being sober from drugs.

Black Grape's existence was made public in 1995; they played a handful of shows in the United Kingdom, as well as festivals in mainland Europe. "Reverend Black Grape" was released as the lead single from It's Great When You're Straight...Yeah in May 1995, followed by the second single "In the Name of the Father" in July 1995. A tour of the United States was planned for later in the year but was postponed due to the band members' past convictions. Kermit was diagnosed with sepsis and, as a result, had to miss performances. His role was covered by Carl "Psycho" McCarthy when the band went on a UK tour in early 1996; Bez left shortly after, citing financial disagreements. They embarked on a US tour in April 1996, which was promoted with "Kelly's Heroes", the third single from the album.

It's Great When You're Straight...Yeah received generally positive reviews from music critics, several of whom saw it as an update to Happy Mondays' sound and highlighted Ryder's lyricism. It topped the UK Albums Chart for two weeks and reached the top 20 in New Zealand, Scotland, and Sweden. The album went on to sell 100,000 copies in the UK, where it was certified platinum, and 600,000 copies worldwide. "Reverend Black Grape" and "In the Name of the Father" reached the top ten in both Scotland and the UK; "In the Name of the Father" reached the top 40 in the US Billboard Alternative Songs chart. "Kelly's Heroes" peaked within the top 20 in Scotland and the UK. It's Great When You're Straight appeared on album of the year and best of decade lists by Melody Maker, NME, and Select.

== Background ==
Happy Mondays released their fourth studio album, Yes Please!, in September 1992. The band's label, Factory Records, went into administration two months later. Their manager had secured a contract with EMI; in February 1993, the band met a representative from the label. Frontman Shaun Ryder bailed on an interview with the rep; after a band meeting, where they realised it would be difficult to revive interest with the label, they decided to break up. Following this, Ryder lived in Cheshire, left his long-term girlfriend, and started to date Donovan's daughter, Oriole Leitch; dancer Mark "Bez" Berry became a local celebrity around Manchester. Despite Ryder saying he left the music industry, he guested on an Intastella B-side. Ryder formed a band with his brother, bassist Paul Ryder, who would leave shortly after to start a band with his girlfriend. Bez and Ruthless Rap Assassins member Paul "Kermit" Leveridge then joined Shaun Ryder's act, which was now named Black Grape.

Ryder previously worked with Kermit when recording his vocals for Yes Please!, where Kermit guested on "Cut 'Em Loose Bruce". The pair bonded while on Happy Mondays' final tour and would appear on stage with them during several performances. A&R man Gary Kurfirst, who was friends with Yes Please! producers Chris Frantz and Tina Weymouth and was aware of Happy Mondays, contacted Ryder about his future plans. He recruited Intastella bassist Martin Mittler and guitarist Martin Wright for a demo session at Drone Studios in Chorlton-cum-Hardy, where they laid down versions of "Kelly's Heroes", "Reverend Black Grape", and "Yeah Yeah Brother". Ryder sent the demos to Kurfirst, who promptly flew him to the United States to sign a recording contract. John Price of Warner Chappell Music had sent an offer to Ryder after hearing the demos, but by this time Kurfirst was in talks with him. Kurfirst wanted to sign Ryder as a solo artist, though he preferred working in a band, to his label, Radioactive Records, a subsidiary of MCA Records, as well as control Ryder's publishing and act as his manager.

The band were put in touch with management company Nicholl and Dime, which consisted of Nik and Gloria Nicholls, by Frantz and Weymouth. Kurfirst helped to orchestrate a signing with them; the pair, though officially tour managers, were used to appear as the band's management to avoid looking like a conflict of interest for Kurfirst. Nicholl and Dime paid for the band to record home demos; they were unsuccessfully shopped around to multiple labels, many of whom felt it unwise to spend money on Ryder. Black Grape officially signed to Radioactive Records in March 1993. Brendan Bourke, the label's general manager, was a fan of Happy Mondays and was planned to be that band's American manager prior to them breaking up. The contract advance allowed Black Grape to buy equipment and book time in a recording studio. As the heads of Radioactive were impressed by the recordings they had up to this point, they gave Black Grape more money. Demo sessions continued into early 1994; around this time, Mittler and Wright returned to Intastella. Kermit's former bandmate and Ruthless Rap Assassins drummer Ged Lynch, along with Paul "Wags" Wagstaff of Paris Angels, were recruited.

== Recording ==
As with Happy Mondays in their early years, Black Grape were unsure of their musical direction. Ryder told Bourke that he wished to make an album that combined the sounds of hip hop group Cypress Hill and rock band the Rolling Stones. Bourke suggested one producer, former Altered Images member Stephen Lironi, who would help shape Black Grape's song structures. Ryder met Lironi in a London studio in June 1994 to see if they would work well together; they co-wrote "Shake Your Money" in the process. Bourke then suggested producer Danny Saber, who worked with artists that appealed to Ryder's music taste, such as Cypress Hill, House of Pain, and Bobby Womack. Saber had a publishing deal with EMI Music Publishing, who asked them to send him to the UK. Saber went to London, where he was put in touch with a member of EMI, who connected him with Shannon O'Shea. O'Shea had the management company SOS Management, whose clients consisted of producers, such as Butch Vig. Someone in Black Grape's camp contacted O'Shea with the aim of getting Vig. O'Shea had worked with Saber on a couple of projects and felt he was a better fit for the band. Kurfirst subsequently put Ryder in contact with Saber.

Ryder and Saber had a writing session at Battery Studios in London, where they came up with "Shake Well Before Opening". Bourke said that since Lironi and Saber were multi-instrumentalists, they would be key in helping form Black Grape's debut. Shortly before starting the recording sessions, Saber flew to the UK again, but the label would not acquire him a work visa. His cousin was getting married; the customer service officer at the airport allowed him to stay one night for the wedding before he returned to Los Angeles, California. He was worried the band would start recording without him until Ryder called him and reassured him that they would wait. A demo session was held with Saber at Spirit Studio in Manchester, where the band and Saber wrote two songs. It's Great When You're Straight...Yeah was recorded over the course of seven weeks in late 1994 and early 1995 with Saber, Lironi, and Ryder as producers. Ryder said Lironi's involvement as a co-producer came from Radioactive wanting the album to have a rock element to it so as to avoid leaning too heavily into hip hop territory.

The sessions began at Rockfield Studios in Monmouth, Wales; they wanted to record in Ireland until they found it too expensive. At the same studio, Happy Mondays' contemporaries, the Stone Roses, were working on their second and final studio album, Second Coming (1994). Black Grape would stay in pubs until late afternoon and start recording in the evenings. Across three separate sessions at Rockfield, they came up with guitar-based rock tracks and sample-driven dance songs. Ryder felt Saber was a perfect match with the band, adding that he gave the recordings a poppy sound, comparing them to Pin Ups by David Bowie (1973). Upon leaving Rockfield, Black Grape had finished six songs, with four more in progress. Recording moved to Boundary Row in London and then to Chapel Studios in Alford, Lincolnshire, for three weeks. This was done because the band were short of two songs because Kurfirst rejected material that had too much of a hip hop sound to them. Phil Auklt, Saber, Jim Spencer, and Eawn Davis acted as engineers, with additional engineering from Michael Scherchen. Saber recorded Ryder and Kermit adlibbing, which he would later add to the recordings, such as during the ending of "Little Bob". Tom Lord-Alge mixed the recordings at Encore Studios in Los Angeles before they were mastered by Ted Jensen at Sterling Sound in New York.

== Composition and lyrics ==
Musically, the sound of It's Great When You're Straight...Yeah has been described as dance-pop and pop funk. Author Lisa Verrico wrote in her book High Life 'N' Low Down Dirty: The Thrills and Spills of Shaun Ryder that with its "funky basslines, stuttering hip hop beats, odd noises, psychedelic effects and jubilant brass section," she dubbed it the "ultimate party album". According to Ryder, the album title refers sarcastically to being free of mood-altering substances, despite the band frequently consuming drugs during the time period. Ryder compared the writing process to that of Happy Mondays' third studio album Pills 'n' Thrills and Bellyaches (1990), which was partially written in the studio. He and Kermit would come up with lyrics by vocally sparring with each other; any lines they thought would work in a song were kept. Ryder attributed the various religious imagery across the album to Samuel L. Jackson's character Jules in the 1994 film Pulp Fiction, in the way he would recite Bible passages as well as his own Irish Catholic upbringing. In addition to the band, other musicians contributed to the recordings: Saber with guitars, bass, keyboards, Hammond organ, and programming; Anthony Guarderas with bass; Lironi with keyboards, Hammond organ, and programming; Dahni Birihani with sitar; and Michael Scherchen with programming.

"Reverend Black Grape" includes several references to religion; Ryder said this was unintentional and attributes this to his Catholic upbringing and Kermit's gospel background. The pair had previously talked about how "ridiculous elements of it were, and that just came through in the lyrics organically". It also includes a reference to how Bez would socialise frequently, which the rest of Happy Mondays saw as negative. Part of its chorus section is borrowed from the hymn "O Come, All Ye Faithful". In the song's demo, instead of a harmonica, they used a Casio keyboard. Saber suggested replacing it with a harmonica and had Bledynn Richards, who was found in a local pub, play the part. "In the Name of the Father" alludes to Ryder leaving school at an early age and Neil Armstrong walking on the Moon. It includes additional vocals from Emma Day and Carl "Psycho" McCarthy, the latter of whom Kermit knew from the band Moss Side and would later make remixes of "Revered Black Grape".

Discussing "Tramazi Parti", Ryder said temazepam was the band's favourite drug around this time, which they changed the name of to avoid legal issues. It features slide guitar from Lironi and a saxophone part from Martin Slattery. "Kelly's Heroes" was named after the 1970 film of the same name; in its original form, the song leaned towards hip hop in the style of Wu-Tang Clan. The song had its origins during the last Happy Monday rehearsal session, when they met the EMI representative. Kurfirst wanted a crossover hit, and after hearing "Kelly's Heroes", had the band add a big guitar riff to appeal to rock fans. Nicholl contributed slide guitar to it. Part of its lyrics poke fun at celebrity culture as well as varying perspectives of Jesus' character; the last few lyrics are specifically about the white Christian version of him. "Yeah Yeah Brother" is about how the rest of Happy Mondays expressed wishes of never wanting to work with Ryder again and the demise of the band. Ryder wrote the song for Yes Please! but was rejected by the other members of Happy Mondays and theorised that he had "sort of ripped it off some reggae song".

"A Big Day in the North" includes backing vocals from Helen Vigneau and a sample of a piano part taken from "Initials B.B." (1968) by Serge Gainsbourg. Saber created the beat for the track, which initially had a French flavour to it; Ryder had him change it to a "northern English take" on Gainsbourg. Saber's wife spoke French, so Ryder had her translate some of its lyrics into that language, selecting the lines he felt worked best in the song. "Shake Well Before Opening" discusses violent crime in Manchester. "Submarine" talks about a person taking wrong decisions in their life; its chorus section attempts to emulate the one in "Fool to Cry" (1976) by the Rolling Stones, while the second verse borrows the melody from "A Day in the Life" (1967) by the Beatles. It also features slide guitar from Lironi and lifts the drum beat and the guitar riff from the Rolling Stones' "Sympathy for the Devil" (1968). "Shake Your Money" is about drug-dealing youths; it includes slide guitar from Nicholl and concludes with Ryder yelling expletives. "Little Bob" includes snippets of "Hey Jude" (1968) by the Beatles, backed by soul-sounding horns and a saxophone solo from Slattery.

== Release ==
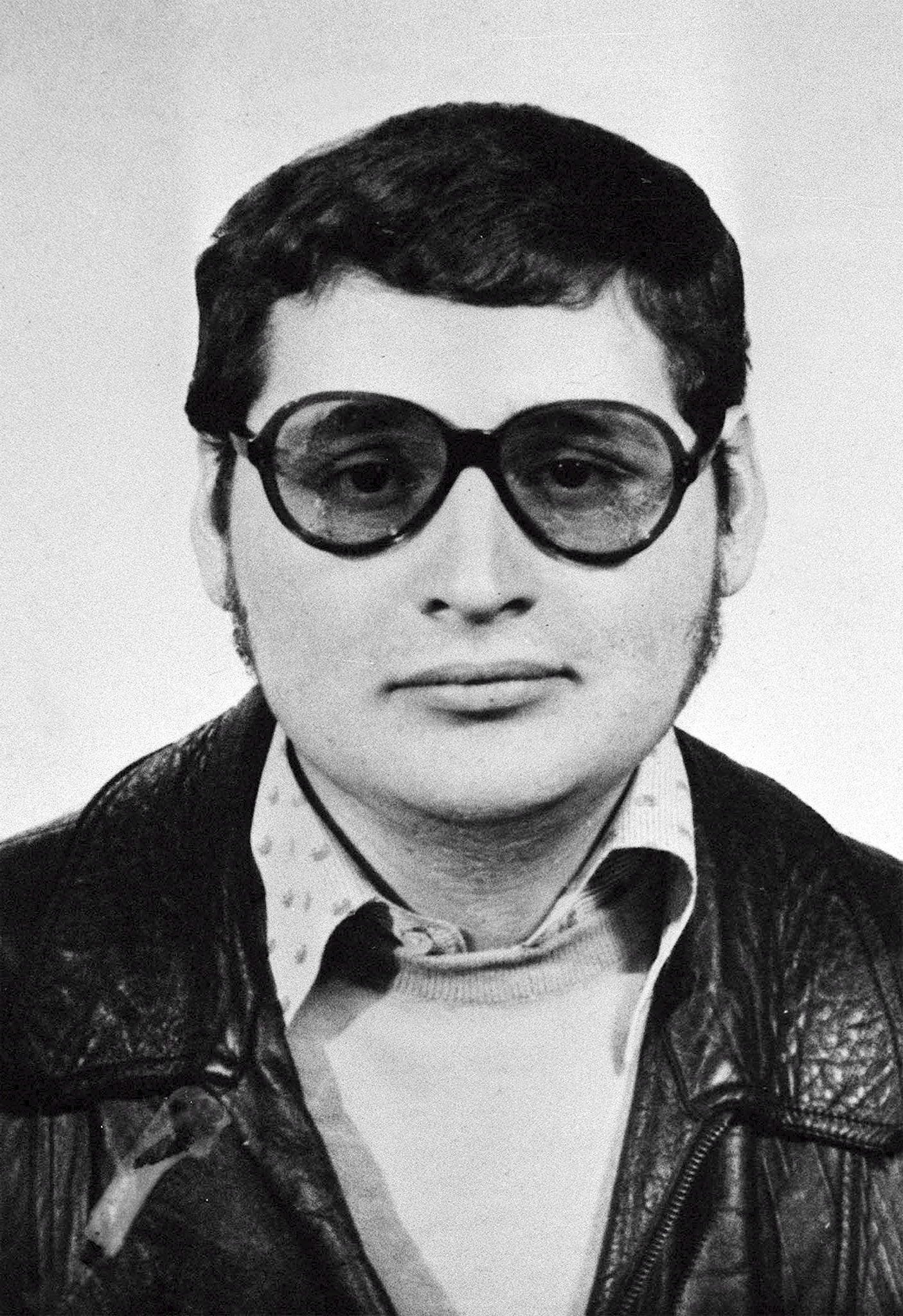
The decision to use this photo of convicted terrorist Carlos the Jackal as the album cover's basis attracted criticism from the Anti-Defamation League.

In early 1995, the existence of Black Grape was made public; in the two years that Ryder had been out of the public eye, the music scene across the UK had shifted. The British-led Britpop genre, for which Happy Mondays were one of the influences, replaced the American-driven grunge scene. In the process, it made indie-focused guitar music mainstream. Alongside this, the UK saw the rise of lad culture and magazines such as Loaded. After a small series of UK shows, they played a variety of UK and mainland European festivals, including Féile and T in the Park. The band's live line-up was augmented by Slattery and bassist Danny Williams. It's Great When You're Straight...Yeah was released in the UK on 7 August 1995, and in the United States on 10 October 1995. The cover art, made by Central Station Design, is a pop art photo of Carlos the Jackal. Pat and Matt Carroll of the company liked one particular image of Carlos, though they were unaware of his terrorist activities. It received criticism from the Anti-Defamation League (ADL), which was claiming the band were using it to promote him as a role model amongst a younger demographic. The band said they picked it because he was known for using a variety of disguises. The booklet includes a similarly edited photo of a younger Michael Jackson, as well as an image of the band and Saber sitting on the roof of an amusement arcade in Skegness.

In October 1995, Black Grape appeared on Later... with Jools Holland, where they played "In the Name of the Father", "Reverend Black Grape", and "Tramazi Parti". On 23 October 1995, "In the Name of the Father" was released to modern rock radio stations in the US. The band were preparing to tour that territory over the next two months; however, the members' past drug convictions meant that they were denied entry into the country. While returning to the UK from Spain, Kermit fell ill. Upon arriving at Monsall Hospital in Manchester, he was diagnosed with sepsis, which was explained at the time as drinking bad water. Ryder recounted that it actually stemmed from a dirty needle. Kermit went into a coma for four days and subsequently lost several stones in weight over the next few weeks. It would take him ten months to fully recover from the illness. As the band were unable to enter the US, Ryder went on holiday with his wife to various locations, including Jamaica, before landing in Cuba in December 1995. American journalists were invited to visit and interview the band; it went unsuccessful due to Bez missing his flight, Kermit still recovering, and Ryder falling ill after being in Jamaica.

In February 1996, the band went on a UK tour; Kermit's role was covered by Psycho. At the tour's conclusion, he joined the band on a permanent basis. Bez departed from the band in March 1996, citing disagreements over finances with the band's label. Ryder and Bez had previously agreed not to repeat mistakes they had made with Happy Mondays, such as partying or spending massive amounts of money. Bez had slowly increased his drug consumption from three ecstasy pills a night to ten. The band were also frequently spending £100 per night on the energy drink Ultrafuel for Bez, which he would give to multiple hangers-on. Ryder was tired of losing the band's money through these activities and had a fight with Bez around it. Following an assault on the Nicholls', Bez left the band. Later in March 1996, Kermit appeared with the band for a performance on TFI Friday. After seven months of delays, Ryder was granted a visa in the US with assistance from Kurfirst; the next month, they undertook a tour of the US and South America. Kermit had to miss the trek as a result of a lung infection.

In 2015, Black Grape went on a celebratory 20th anniversary tour for It's Great When You're Straight...Yeah. It was reissued in 2016 and promoted with another tour that same year. Ryder said various footage of the band shot throughout their career was left off the reissue due to all of it being recorded on various video formats that had not been transferred to a modern format. The music videos for "Reverend Black Grape", "In the Name of the Father", and "Kelly's Heroes", the latter of which had two separate versions, were all posted to YouTube in 2017.

=== Singles ===
==== Reverend Black Grape ====
"Reverend Black Grape" was released as a single in May 1995, with "Straight Out of Trumpton" and a remix of "Reverend Black Grape" as its B-sides. It was sent to modern rock radio stations in the US in August 1996. The music video for "Reverend Black Grape" was filmed in Ancoats, Manchester, with some interior shots at a bar in the same city, with director Don Letts. Kurfirst selected him as he used to manage Big Audio Dynamite, of which Letts was a member. Ryder took a liking to Letts because of his musical style with that band, going as far as to say that the video was highly influenced by Big Audio Dynamite in its religious imagery and cowboy atmosphere. It stars Ryder and Kermit dressed as American preachers, intended to tie in with the song's religious references. The video was banned from TV airings due to part of the lyrics accusing the Pope of war crimes, which angered the Catholic Church. They performed "Reverend Black Grape" on Top of the Pops around this time.

==== In the Name of the Father ====
"In the Name of the Father" was released as a single in July 1995, with "Land of 1000 Karma Sutra Babes" and a remix of "In the Name of the Father" as its B-sides. It was sent to mainstream rock and modern rock radio stations in the US in October 1995. The music video for "In the Name of the Father" was filmed over the course of a week in Ocho Rios, Jamaica, at Letts' suggestion, who returned to direct it. Letts portrayed the band members as missionaries, with Ryder seen floating down a river on a raft and being baptized.

==== Kelly's Heroes ====
"Kelly's Heroes" was released as a radio single in March 1996, coinciding with their US tour the following month. Two versions were released on CD: the first with a live version of "Little Bob" and remixes of "Kelly's Heroes", while the second featured live versions of "Kelly's Heroes", "In the Name of the Father", and "Fat Neck". Two music videos were filmed for "Kelly's Heroes": the first saw Bez dressed as Batman and Ryder wearing a wig, filmed in a club in London. The label did not like this one, prompting a second one to be done, revolving around a bank robbery. As Kermit was ill during this second shoot, Psycho filled his role. Prior to the release of the single, a writ was issued by Intastella, who said they had partially written "Kelly's Heroes" and other songs on the album. That band had registered the material, claiming they were owed royalties for the album and its singles. Ryder retorted that Mittler and Wright had only spent 30 minutes at most in a studio with him and settled out of court. The song A Big Day In The North was used on the soundtrack for the feature film Virtuosity.

== Critical reception ==
Professional ratings
Initial reviews (in 1995)
Review scores
Source	Rating
The Guardian	4/5 stars
NME	10/10
Q	4/5 stars
Rolling Stone	3/5 stars
Select	5/5
Smash Hits	4/5 stars
The Sun-Herald	3.5/5 stars
Vox	9/10

Professional ratings
Retrospective reviews (after 1995)
Review scores
Source	Rating
AllMusic	4.5/5 stars
Mojo	4/5 stars
Uncut	7/10

It's Great When You're Straight...Yeah was met with generally positive reviews from music critics. Verrico said that some reviewers saw it as an update to Happy Mondays' sound, aided by Saber's beats and Kermit's vocals. Vox's Stephen Dalton said the band "buzz with the life-affirming, innovative, fuck-you spirit of true rock'n'roll". He praised the album for mixing several styles into the band's sound, as had author Dave Thompson in his book Alternative Rock (2000). Ted Kessler of NME expanded on this, saying that it was a "record drenched in so many different styles and influences that it puts the recent achievements of Blur and Oasis in sharp perspective." AllMusic's Stephen Thomas Erlewine wrote that It's Great When You're Straight...Yeah omits the "stiff musicianship" that soiled Happy Mondays' work, calling it a "surreal, funky, profane, and perversely joyous album" that is "overflowing with casual eclecticism and giddy humor." Chris Adams of Lollipop Magazine also praised its mix of styles: "Stylistically, this album's all over the fucking place, and like the Beatles' Revolver, it's all the stronger because of it." The Times writer Caitlin Moran agreed, stating that "for such an eclectic record," the results were "staggering". The Irish Times writer Tony Clayton-Lea said it "kicked Happy Mondays into touch with a sequence of swaggering dance-pop tunes that still sound like no one else." Dirty Tapper of Record Collector felt that the album "seems to get bored with itself halfway through."

Several reviewers commented on Ryder's vocals and lyrics. Rolling Stone writer Jason Cohen wrote that Ryder's "ranting – crisply phrased if somewhat slurry – melds in vibrant harmony with Leveridge's raps, toasts and croons." Q reviewer Tom Doyle added to this, saying that Ryder's words were "still rooted in the wonderful Lennonesque gobbledygook of yore". Erlewine thought Ryder came across as "reinvigorated, creating bizarre rhymes", and called the lyrics "freewheelingly impenetrable". Adam Higginbotham of Select called the lyrics "as chaotic and hilarious as ever"; Moran echoed this, saying the words were "utterly, and intentionally, giggle-inducing". The Guardian critic Caroline Sullivan wrote that Ryder was "fantastically coarse on parts of this LP, shouting, swearing and, undoubtedly, elbowing his mates as he sings". In a retrospective review for Louder, Dalton said Kermit and Ryder's "sharp lyrical skills [remain] especially striking". The Times' David Sinclair said Ryder and Kermit spar "each other in a series of loutish bawling matches, the two vocalists lead the troupe [...] although it tends to be Ryder who has the last word"; The Sun-Herald writer Peter Holmes found that Ryder's "daggy Mancurian swagger is intact and as enjoyable as ever".

== Commercial performance and accolades ==
It's Great When You're Straight...Yeah topped the UK Albums Chart for two weeks. It sold over 100,000 copies in its first month of release. The album was certified platinum by the British Phonographic Industry (BPI) the following year. It ranked at number 41 and 100 on the 1995 and 1996 UK year-end charts, respectively. It also charted at number 2 in Scotland, number 13 in Sweden, and number 20 in New Zealand. The album sold 36,000 copies in the US; it would go on to sell over 600,000 copies worldwide. "Reverend Black Grape" reached number five in Scotland and number nine in the UK. "In the Name of the Father" reached number 5 in Scotland, number 8 in the UK, and number 31 on the US Billboard Alternative Songs chart. "Kelly's Heroes" reached number 13 in Scotland and number 17 in the UK.

It's Great When You're Straight...Yeah was short-listed for the 1996 Mercury Prize, losing to Different Class by Pulp. "Reverend Black Grape" won the 1995 NME award for Single of the Year. Select ranked "In the Name of the Father" as the 35th best single of 1995. Ryder felt the album's success was the result of contemporary albums having a dated sound to them: "Britpop was just building to a peak, and there were so many boring guitar bands, playing their dads' type of music", making it stand out in comparison. In a retrospective article on big beat, Dave McGonigle of Stylus Magazine asserted that "no one exemplifies the core kudos of big beat better" than Black Grape. He explained that they had "managed to project the spirit of P-Funk firmly into the mid 90s. The partyed-up ethos of old funk and new beats was perfectly exemplified by The Grape".

== Track listing ==
Writing credits per booklet. All recordings produced by Danny Saber, Stephen Lironi, and Shaun Ryder.

No.	Title	Writer(s)	Length
1.	"Reverend Black Grape"	Ryder; Paul "Kermit" Leveridge	5:12
2.	"In the Name of the Father"	Ryder; Danny Saber	4:21
3.	"Tramazi Parti"	Ryder; Leveridge; Lironi	4:45
4.	"Kelly's Heroes"	Ryder; Leveridge	4:22
5.	"Yeah Yeah Brother"	Ryder	4:10
6.	"A Big Day in the North"	Ryder; Saber	4:10
7.	"Shake Well Before Opening"	Ryder; Saber	5:40
8.	"Submarine"	Ryder; Leveridge	3:50
9.	"Shake Your Money"	Ryder; Lironi	4:13
10.	"Little Bob"	Ryder; Leveridge; Saber	5:33
Total length:			46:16

== Personnel ==
Personnel per booklet.

Black Grape

- Shaun Ryder – vocals
- Paul "Kermit" Leveridge – vocals
- Bez – vibes
- Paul "Wags" Wagstaff – guitar
- Ged Lynch – drums, percussion

Additional musicians

- Danny Saber – guitars, bass, keyboards, Hammond organ, programming
- Anthony Guarderas – bass
- Stephen Lironi – keyboards, Hammond organ, slide guitar (tracks 3 and 8), programming
- Dahni Birihani – sitar
- Michael Scherchen – programming
- Bledynn Richards – harmonica (track 1)
- Emma Day – backing vocals (track 2)
- Carl "Psycho" McCarthy – additional vocal (track 2)
- Martin Slattery – saxophone (tracks 3 and 10)
- Nik Nicholl – slide guitar (tracks 4 and 9)
- Helen Vigneau – backing vocals (track 6)

Production and design

- Phil Ault – engineer
- Danny Saber – engineer, producer
- Jim Spencer – engineer
- Ewan Davis – engineer
- Michael Scherchen – additional engineering
- Stephen Lironi – producer
- Shaun Ryder – producer
- Tom Lord-Alge – mixing
- Ted Jensen – mastering
- Pat Carrol – sleeve design
- Matt Carrol – sleeve design
- Central Station Design – artwork

== Charts and certifications ==
=== Weekly charts ===
Chart performance for It's Great When You're Straight...Yeah
Chart (1995)	Peak position
Australian Albums (ARIA)	111
New Zealand Albums (RMNZ)	20
Scottish Albums (Official Charts)	2
Swedish Albums (Sverigetopplistan)	13
UK Albums (Official Charts)	1

=== Year-end charts ===
Year-end chart performance for It's Great When You're Straight...Yeah
Chart (1995)	Position
UK Albums (OCC)	41
Chart (1996)	Position
UK Albums (OCC)	100

== Certifications ==
Certifications for It's Great When You're Straight...Yeah
Region	Certification	Certified units/sales
United Kingdom (BPI)	Platinum	300,000^{^}
^{^} Shipments figures based on certification alone.

== See also ==
- Wonderland – the 2001 album by the Charlatans, which was also produced by Saber and shares a similar musical style

== Bibliography ==
=== Books and AV media ===
- Middles, Mick (1997). Shaun Ryder: Happy Mondays, Black Grape & Other Traumas. London: Independent Music Press. ISBN 1-897783-11-6.
- Miles, Barry; Scott, Grant; Morgan, Johnny (2016). The Greatest Album Covers of All Time. Collins & Brown. ISBN 978-1911163367. Archived from the original on 23 October 2021.
- Millar, Mark (18 September 2016). "Xs Noize Music Podcast: Shaun Ryder + Danny Saber - It's Great When You're Straight... Yeah, 21 Years on". Xs Noize (Podcast). Archived from the original on 1 December 2020.
- Ryder, Shaun (2012). Twisting My Melon: The Autobiography. London: Corgi Books. ISBN 978-0-552-16547-1.
- Ryder, Shaun (2019). Wrote for Luck: Selected Lyrics. London: Faber & Faber. ISBN 978-0-571-33093-5.
- Spence, Simon (2013). The Stone Roses: War and Peace. London: Penguin Books. ISBN 978-0-241-97197-0.
- Spence, Simon (2015). Happy Mondays – Excess All Areas: A Biography (paperback ed.). London: Aurum Press. ISBN 978-1-78131-499-9.
- Thompson, Dave (2000). Alternative Rock. Third Ear: The Essential Listening Companion. San Francisco, California: Miller Freeman Books. ISBN 0-87930-607-6.
- Verrico, Lisa (1998). High Life 'N' Low Down Dirty: The Thrills and Spills of Shaun Ryder. London: Ebury Press. ISBN 0-09-185419-9.
- Warburton, John; Ryder, Shaun (2011). Hallelujah!: The Extraordinary Story of Shaun Ryder and Happy Mondays. London: Virgin Books. ISBN 978-0-7535-0781-0.

=== Journals and magazines ===
- Borzillo, Carrie (28 October 1995). "Popular Uprisings". Billboard. Vol. 107, no. 43. ISSN 0006-2510. Archived from the original on 23 October 2021.
- Borzillo, Carrie (6 April 1996). "Popular Uprisings". Billboard. Vol. 108, no. 14. ISSN 0006-2510. Archived from the original on 22 October 2021.
- Cigarettes, Johnny (30 March 1996). "Off Me 'Ead, Son!". NME. ISSN 0028-6362.
- Dalton, Stephen (September 1995). "Reviews". Vox. ISSN 0960-300X.
- Doyle, Tom (September 1995). "Carefree". Q (108). ISSN 0955-4955.
- Harris, John (December 2016). "The wild bunch". Mojo (277). ISSN 1351-0193.
- Harrison, Ian (November 1995). "Posters". Select (65). ISSN 0959-8367.
- Higginbotham, Adam (September 1995). "Triumph of the ill". Select (63). ISSN 0959-8367.
- Holmes, Peter (3 September 1995). "CD Romp". The Sun-Herald. OCLC 67710301.
- Male, Andrew (January 1996). "...And the Top 50 Singles of '95". Select (67). ISSN 0959-8367.
- Moran, Caitlin (21 July 1995). "Grape expectations are happily fulfilled". The Times. ISSN 0140-0460.
- Ross, Sean, ed. (20 October 1995). "Rock Highlights" (PDF). Rock Airplay Monitor. 2 (43). OCLC 60627318.
- Ross, Sean, ed. (8 March 1996a). "Modern Rock" (PDF). Rock Airplay Monitor. 3 (11). OCLC 60627318.
- Ross, Sean, ed. (2 August 1996b). "Modern" (PDF). Rock Airplay Monitor. 3 (32). OCLC 60627318.
- Sexton, Paul (3 August 1996). "Mercury Noms Show Great Depth Of Acts". Billboard. Vol. 108, no. 31. ISSN 0006-2510. Archived from the original on 23 October 2021.
- Sexton, Paul (24 January 1998). "Black Grape Rift Won't Sour Release Plan". Billboard. Vol. 110, no. 4. ISSN 0006-2510.
- Sinclair, David (5 August 1995). "Pop Album". The Times. ISSN 0140-0460.
- Staunton, Terry (December 2016). "Black Grape: It's Great When You're Straight... Yeah". Uncut (235). ISSN 1368-0722.
- Sullivan, Caroline (11 August 1995). "CD of the week: Black Grape". The Guardian. ISSN 0261-3077.
