= I've Been Lonely for So Long =

Single by Frederick Knight

from the album I've Been Lonely for So Long
- B-side: "Lean on Me"
- Released: April 1972
- Genre: Southern soul Country pop
- Length: 3:11
- Label: Stax STA-0117 (US); Stax 2025-098 (UK)
- Songwriter(s): Posie Knight, Jerry Weaver

Frederick Knight singles chronology
"Trouble" (1972)	"I've Been Lonely for So Long" (1972)	"This is My Song of Love to You" (1973)

"I've Been Lonely for So Long" is a pop-soul song recorded by American southern soul singer Frederick Knight in 1972. It was written by his wife, Posie Knight, and Jerry Weaver. It was released as a single and peaked at number 27 on the Billboard pop chart, number 8 on the R&B chart and number 23 on the British pop chart in 1972. It was also released on his 1973 album of the same name.

The song is noted for its spoken recitation in the middle of the song.

== Chart performance ==
Chart (1972)	Peak position
UK Singles Chart	23
US Billboard Black Singles	8
US Billboard Hot 100	27
US Cash Box Top 100	20

== Other versions ==
- Leo Sayer during sessions for his 1978 album Leo Sayer it later featured as a bonus track on CD reissues.
- Mick Jagger, on his 1993 solo album Wandering Spirit
- Paul Young during sessions for his 1983 album No Parlez
- Peter Blakeley recorded the song, under the shortened title "I've Been Lonely", for his 1993 album The Pale Horse, and as a single, which reached #61 on the Australian ARIA chart.
- Black Grape, on their 1997 album Stupid Stupid Stupid
- Lambchop, on their 1998 album What Another Man Spills
- John Farnham, on his 2000 album 33⅓
- Hazmat Modine, on their 2011 album Cicada
