= Yes Please! =

Studio album by Happy Mondays
- Released: 21 September 1992
- Recorded: January–March 1992; May 1992
- Studios: Blue Wave, Saint Philip, Barbados; Comfort's Place, Lingfield, Surrey
- Genre: Soul funk
- Length: 48:37
- Label: Factory
- Producers: Chris Frantz; Tina Weymouth

Happy Mondays chronology
Pills 'n' Thrills and Bellyaches (1990)	Yes Please! (1992)	Uncle Dysfunktional (2007)

Singles from Yes Please!
- 1. "Stinkin' Thinkin'" Released: 31 August 1992; 2. "Sunshine and Love" Released: 9 November 1992

Yes Please! (stylised as ...Yes Please!) is the fourth studio album by British rock band Happy Mondays, released on 21 September 1992 through Factory Records. Following the non-album single "Judge Fudge", Factory allotted the band a budget of £150,000 for their next album. After settling on producers Chris Frantz and Tina Weymouth, both members of Talking Heads and Tom Tom Club, Happy Mondays decamped to Blue Wave Studio in Saint Philip, Barbados, in February 1992. The sessions were met with hindrances as frontman Shaun Ryder developed a crack cocaine habit and dancer Bez suffered several injuries from reckless behavior. With the only completed material being instrumental and a lack of lyrics or usable vocal tracks, the band returned to the United Kingdom; Ryder was admitted into a detox centre. Recording continued for two weeks in May 1992 at Comfort's Place Studio in Lingfield, Surrey, where Ryder finally recorded his vocals. Yes Please! is a soul funk album with a bleak sound that earned it a comparison to Joy Division's Unknown Pleasures (1979), previously released on Factory.

Yes Please! received mixed reviews from music critics; some found it to be entirely uninspired, while others said it had some high points. It peaked at number 14 on the UK Albums Chart, going on to sell 50,000 copies by the end of the year. Happy Mondays toured the UK in October 1992, which was followed by a one-off Japanese show. Factory Records went into administration the next month; the band broke up in early 1993. "Stinkin' Thinkin'", released as the lead single from Yes Please! on 31 August 1992, topped the Billboard Dance Club Songs chart in the United States and peaked at number 31 in the UK. "Sunshine and Love", released as the album's second single on 9 November 1992, reached number 5 on the Dance Club Songs chart and reached number 62 in the UK.

== Background ==
Happy Mondays released their third studio album, Pills 'n' Thrills and Bellyaches, on 5 November 1990. It peaked at number four in the United Kingdom; all three of its singles reached the top 20 in the UK, with "Step On" and "Kinky Afro" both peaking at number five. Around the album's release, a newspaper article was published that detailed frontman Shaun Ryder's past experiences with drugs, making his addiction to heroin (and toying with crack) and stint in a detox centre public in the process. A public relations representative from the band's label, Factory Records, had to issue a statement on Ryder's behalf, denouncing his drug use. The album was promoted with a UK arena tour, a trek to mainland Europe, and a two-month stint in the United States, ending with a variety of headlining shows and festival appearances in August 1991.

Guitarist Mark Day got married as bassist Paul Ryder's marriage was coming to an end, resulting in him and Shaun Ryder doing more heroin. The latter Ryder increased his crack intake, while drummer Gary Whelan began suffering from depression and turned to alcohol. Rehearsals bore no new ideas; a recording session with Paul Oakenfold and Steve Osborne, producers of Pills 'n' Thrills and Bellyaches, resulted in "Judge Fudge" and the unfinished "Baby Big Head". While the idea of a new album was suggested, both producers felt that the timing was not right, saying it would descend into chaos due to the state of the band. During this time, the Madchester and baggy scenes had fallen out of popularity as Nirvana released Nevermind (1991), allowing for the success of grunge acts such as Alice in Chains, Pearl Jam, and Soundgarden. "Judge Fudge" was released as a non-album single in November 1991, charting within the UK top 30.

Despite Pills 'n' Thrills and Bellyaches being a commercial success, Factory Records was struggling financially. To help alleviate some of it, Factory released Happy Mondays' first live album, titled Live. Factory Records had a distribution and licencing deal with major label London Recordings, which helped to push the visibility of Pills 'n' Thrills and Bellyaches in European countries. A potential buyout from London was threatened if Factory was unable to handle its financial security. Misguided artist development, property investments, and overspent album budgets for Happy Mondays and New Order meant that Factory had little funds left. In an attempt to recoup costs, Happy Mondays manager Nathan McGough and New Order manager Rob Gretton promised Factory founder Tony Wilson that neither of their respective bands' next albums would exceed a budget of £150,000.

== Recording ==
=== Selecting producers and studios ===
Despite relationships between Happy Mondays members straining, Shaun Ryder told McGough they had written enough material for another album. The band and Factory Records wanted to enlist Oakenfold and Osborne for their next album, but the pair was fully booked until June 1992 at the earliest. Concerned that they could not wait that long, McGough and Wilson decided to look for other producers. Paul Ryder was listening to Ziggy Marley and the Melody Makers' Conscious Party (1988), and after learning that it was produced by Talking Heads and Tom Tom Club members Chris Frantz and Tina Weymouth, thought they would be ideal producers for Happy Mondays' next album. Around the same time, the band had a new booking agent, Ian Flooks, who also worked with Frantz and Weymouth. When Flooks caught wind that the band was looking for producers, he suggested the pair.

Frantz and Weymouth knew Wilson and were aware of the band; McGough contacted the office of the couple in early 1992. Paul Ryder and McGough subsequently flew to Connecticut to visit Frantz and Weymouth. The latter pair had been wanting to produce more albums since Conscious Party; with the demise of Talking Heads, the pair felt it was the best time to do so. They listened to Pills 'n' Thrills and Bellyaches, which impressed them, and they were convinced they could aid the band. Unlike Oakenfold and Osborne, Frantz and Weymouth understood how dynamics would work between band members due to their experience in Talking Heads and Tom Tom Club. The rest of Happy Mondays talked with the pair over the phone, telling them that they did not want to be distracted by alcohol and drugs and wanted to be taken seriously as artists.

Paul Ryder, McGough, Frantz, and Weymouth all flew to Miami to visit a studio owned by Bee Gees, with Ryder remarking it was a "huge place but weird, on an industrial estate". The four of them then went to a studio in Ocho Rios, Jamaica, though it was small and lacked a lot of equipment. If they wanted to record there, it would mean they would have to rent gear and fly it to Jamaica. Ryder then suggested Compass Point Studios in The Bahamas, close to where Frantz and Weymouth had a residence. It was previously a state-of-the-art facility, but when Ryder asked Frantz about it, he told Ryder that it had flooded and was in a state of disrepair.

Happy Mondays had a meeting with McGough and Wilson, who gave the band three options on where to record: a studio in Amsterdam, which they were all against; a studio inside a formerly used church in Manchester, which was run by pop producer Pete Waterman; or a studio in Barbados. Waterman had made a pitch to produce the band's next album, which Paul Ryder and Whelan were against while the rest of the band plus McGough were up for. Whelan stated that if they went with Waterman, he would quit. All of them went with Barbados, bar Day, who wanted to make the next album in Manchester. When asked by the band why he wanted to be in Manchester, Day reasoned that they all had families there.

During a meeting with their business expenses manager, McGough told the rest of the band that Shaun Ryder (who was absent) had sacked Day, much to their surprise. Ryder expected to replace him with Smiths guitarist and collaborator in the act Electronic, Johnny Marr. McGough said Day was "unhappy and Shaun [Ryder] felt culturally he wasn't on board. [... Ryder] made it an issue and for half an hour one afternoon Johnny Marr was in [Happy Mondays]". Day had been fired over the phone abruptly; Paul Ryder and Whelan visited Day. Day was confused by the idea, thinking the band wanted to kick him out, until they discovered he simply needed some time off.

=== Barbados sessions; hindrances to recording ===
On 17 January 1992, the day after Day had re-joined the band, they flew from Manchester to The Bahamas. Factory hoped the remote location would help sedate Shaun Ryder's heroin addiction; he had smuggled methadone (intended as a substitute for heroin) into the island, which he consumed immediately upon arrival. They were not allowed to leave the airport unless they had out-going tickets as well, which had not been booked as they were unsure as to how long they would be recording for. Day, still affected by the sack and worried about the workload ahead, had a mental breakdown. Whelan and Paul Ryder had been drinking throughout the 13-hour flight to the island and continued when the band took up residence at Sam Lord's Castle. They were asked to leave the accommodation when they found out keyboardist Paul Davis assaulted the bar band.

They then travelled to Blue Wave Studio in Saint Philip, Barbados, which was owned by Eddy Grant. The studio itself was housed in a shack in the middle of a sugar plantation, as well as being near a jungle. It was on the driveway of Grant's estate, who was away during this time. The studio's manager heard unfavourable stories about the band and had to be reassured by Frantz and Weymouth that the pair would handle everything. The pair and their associates had arrived at the studio some days prior to bringing it up to standard for recording with the band, as there were issues with power outages and fluctuation. Shaun Ryder and Bez lived at the studio so that others could watch him, while the rest of the band set up on a private gated estate. Frantz, Weymouth, and the rest of the band had set up at the studio; when Shaun Ryder showed up, he was unfit to do any work.

Shaun Ryder recounted that Frantz and Weymouth saw him as a "non-musician", Bez as contributing nothing to the band, and Day as having only an amateur grasp of music theory, while Davis and Paul Ryder were the "best of a bad bunch". When sessions were underway, Mark Roula handled recording with assistance from Bryon Europe. Assembled in a live manner, the other members ran through the six partially-completed tracks they had for Frantz and Weymouth. The pair recorded these rehearsals with the intention of going back to them after writing more material. Frantz and Weymouth were not concerned, starting with a lack of completed songs, having dealt with this before with Talking Heads' fourth studio album Remain in Light (1980) and Tom Tom Club's self-titled debut album (1981). Frantz said technician Simon Machan had some pre-programmed beats and keyboard parts that could help them, though his equipment suffered from varying power levels.

Spurred on by the pair's enthusiasm, Day, Davis, Paul Ryder, and Whelan started having fun, recalling their early rehearsals in Manchester. Day had been influenced by Eastern music, resulting in off-kilter guitar parts. Ryder and Whelan locked into grooves, with the encouragement of Weymouth. The majority of the recording was plagued with a variety of issues with the band members. Happy Mondays discovered that the island was full of cheap crack available from local drug dealers, who knew the band was eager to purchase any drugs from them. Shaun Ryder did not enjoy the music the rest of the band was making within the first week, resulting in him and Bez seeking out drugs. He ended up spending 20 hours each day in the toilet, smoking crack, while the others were waiting to record. Bez broke his arm three times: once when crashing a car, the second time in a boat accident, and the third time when his girlfriend sat on it.

Paul Ryder began having withdrawal symptoms from the lack of heroin; as both Ryders became ill, McGough had a doctor prescribe them largactil. It resulted in neither of them having the energy left to record anything, especially Shaun Ryder, who was now unable to sing. Day and Whelan relaxed with their families on the island as they had finished their parts for the album, renting houses by the beachside. Frantz and Weymouth attempted to keep recording going, but the difficulties with the band members eventually saw the pair's enthusiasm dissipate. The pair felt there was the foundation of ten songs recorded, waiting for Shaun Ryder's input. Amid growing frustration from the others, Ryder had yet to write any lyrics for the new songs. They spent a few days trying to coax lyrical inspiration out of Ryder. The constant crack use saw him afflicted with a throat infection, rendering the chance of recording vocals impossible. Whelan let Ryder stay at his place in an effort to spur lyrics out of him.

When Shaun Ryder ran out of money to buy more crack, he ended up selling dealers his clothes. Reports of the band's antics, such as car crashes and excessive drug use, began to reach coverage from tabloids in the UK. One story involved the band withholding the album's master tapes at ransom from Factory, which Whelan denied, while another stated Ryder sold the studio's sofa for crack, to which he clarified he actually sold a sunlounger. Ryder theorised the master tape rumour came about from Frantz and Weymouth being worried about not getting paid because of Factory's financial situation. The pair prodded Ryder to make false claims in order for the label to send them money, which Ryder estimated could not have totalled more than £10,000. Wilson had received intermittent reports about what was happening on the island. As he was in Los Angeles, California, for a few days, he considered visiting the band but ultimately decided not to.

After five weeks of recording, having spent nearly the entire recording budget, the only finished track was "Cut 'Em Loose Bruce". At this point, Bez and McGough had returned to the UK. The band's US label, Elektra Records, sent A&R executive Howard Thompson and a publicist to find out about the album's progress. Frantz and Weymouth played them the vocal-less songs; Thompson was told what was happening, becoming concerned for Shaun Ryder. Thompson attempted to contact McGough, who had settled back in Manchester and was unreachable, and then Wilson, telling him the situation. Wilson was struggling with Factory's debts and called Factory director Alan Erasmus for advice, who told him to do what he felt was best. The rest of the band then left the island on 10 March 1992 with little material finished.

=== Surrey sessions; vocal tracking ===
Shaun Ryder flew to Manchester from Barbados, where he left his wife at the airport and went to find drugs. The following day, Ryder was admitted to the Charter Clinic detox centre in Chelsea, London, for a period of six weeks, with McGough supervising him. When he left, McGough decided to have Ryder avoid Manchester, subsequently booking them an apartment in Newquay for two weeks. While Ryder was in a healthier state, he still struggled with writing new lyrics. Ryder returned home for a week before going to Comfort's Place Studio in Lingfield, Surrey, to do vocals. The sessions re-started in May 1992, with assistance from Ray Mascarenas, for a period of two weeks. Aside from visiting a local pub, Ryder otherwise kept himself free from drugs. On the advice of his doctor, the rest of the band stayed away from the sessions.

Paul Ryder and Astrella Leitch followed the latter's father on tour; Whelan spent time at a gym; Day looked after his newly-born child; Davis moved house; and Bez tended to his broken arm. Trying to aid in the writing, Frantz and Weymouth would have Shaun Ryder do things such as dance on the spot or consult the I Ching for lyrics. They also employed William S. Burroughs' cut-up technique at Weymouth's suggestion. Ryder eventually found himself struggling to enjoy the music the band had made, regretting that he did not take more of an interest when they were recording it. At the time of doing these vocals, Ryder was listening to American rappers, such as Bushwick Bill of the Geto Boys; he had Kermit of Manchester-based outfit Ruthless Rap Assassins sing additional vocals on "Cut 'Em Loose Bruce". Kermit had previously done heroin with Ryder, while Ruthless Rap Assassins had played a show with Happy Mondays sometime prior.

Rowetta, who previously did guest vocals on Pills 'n' Thrills and Bellyaches, was brought in and subsequently had a large role with the new album, adding more melodies. Despite McGough's prior promise to Wilson to not go beyond £150,000, the album ended up costing £380,000; by comparison, New Order's respective album Republic (1993) cost £430,000. Steven Stanley travelled from Jamaica to New York City to mix the recordings. He was assisted by John Parthum at Axis Studios between 1 and 24 June 1992 with the band in attendance. Scott Hull edited and assembled the songs for Bob Ludwig, who mastered the album at Masterdisk, also in New York City. In hindsight, Wilson regretted having Frantz and Weymouth produce the band: "[Bez] said to me, 'Tina and Chris are brilliant [...] But their sound is the Tom Tom Club of the late seventies and early eights. You should have found us the next sound.' And he's totally, totally right".

== Composition and lyrics ==
Musically, the sound of Yes Please! has been described as soul funk. In his biography of the band, writer Simon Spence said the album's title was the result of the studio manager at Blue Wave Studio answering the phone: "Happy Mondays... Yes Please!" Shaun Ryder, on the other hand, said it was a saying their former manager, Phil Saxe, would exclaim in response to questions. He wanted to name it Rubber Lover "because of the picture of 'Our Lady and baby Jesus' on the sleeve". In a retrospective piece for The Quietus, writer Ben Cardew compared its bleak nature to Joy Division's Unknown Pleasures. Unlike that album, which relied on matching its dark lyrics with similar-sounding music, Yes Please! "pairs words of weary disgust with music that forces the Caribbean surroundings in which the album was recorded through a Manchester funk filter". In later years, Shaun Ryder made the admission that he "kind of gave up" with the album, encouraging Paul Ryder and Davis to pick the song themes and titles, such as "Theme from Netto" and "Angel". Machan did programming and sampling, while Bruce Martin provided percussion, as well as additional programming and samples.

"Stinkin' Thinkin'" details Shaun Ryder's time in rehabilitation. Its title phrase came from an American doctor who treated Ryder: "Listen, don't be thinking negative thoughts, it's stinking thinking". Part of the lyrics also deal with the relationships between band members and the state of Factory Records, as well as being lifted from a Brian Eno interview. "Monkey in the Family" is a bass-centric track with an electro song arrangement in the style of EMF and Jesus Jones and Arabic vocalizations. Ryder said the lyrics stemmed from Frantz writing down various words and telling him to include as many of them as he could. "Sunshine and Love" is driven by Talking Heads-lite percussion, with a gospel-esque chorus section from Rowetta. "Dustman" sees Ryder yelling the lyrics incomprehensibly and not in unison with the music, which consisted of bongos, scratch guitar playing, and a Hammond organ.

"Angel" is about visiting a doctor; part of the lyrics were lifted from a newspaper article that quoted Marlene Dietrich. Shaun Ryder wrote "Cut 'em Loose Bruce" after hearing a story of a judge letting crack users off scot-free. With the song, Whelan said the band attempted to make darker Caribbean music. "Theme from Netto" is an instrumental track – Ryder claimed "Netto is Mancunian for Nothing" – that Davis wanted to write and is followed by the 1970s disco song "Love Child". The final song of the album, "Cowboy Dave", was written in reference to Dave Rowbotham, former guitarist of Factory band the Durutti Column, who was murdered by an unknown assailant; the song speculates that the perpetrator was his girlfriend, who discovered his body. The members of Happy Mondays were questioned by the police as they were Factory associates and involved with drugs. Ryder said the lyrics were "what was said in that police interview, pretty much word for word".

== Release ==
=== Factory Records' collapse and singles ===
As recording finished, McGough set about acquiring the band money. On the verge of receivership, Factory Records entered into a deal with London Recordings owner PolyGram, who would assume ownership of Factory. Since Factory was occupied, McGough has managed to gain funds from the band's music publishing royalties, in the area of £250,000. It arrived in staggered payments of £45,000. As Shaun Ryder enacted a legal clause allowing him £20,000 of that sum, Day, Davis, Paul Ryder, and Whelan received £5,000 each. The situation repeated itself twice later in the year; Day said they were "all pissed off about the money". Around this time, Shaun Ryder had restarted his alcohol and heroin habits.

"Stinkin' Thinkin'" was picked by both Ryders as the lead single from the album; released on 31 August 1992, it included "Baby Big Head" and Stephen Hague and Boy's Own remixes of "Stinkin' Thinkin'" as its B-sides. The music video for "Stinkin' Thinkin'", shot at Shepherd's Bush's shopping centre in London, placed a focus on Bez and Shaun Ryder, and the director had a disliking for the rest of the band. They performed the song on Top of the Pops; Ryder sang his vocals live and forgot the words partway through, prompting the need to read off a sheet.

Yes Please! was released on 21 September 1992. Matthew Robertson wrote in his book Factory Records: The Complete Graphic Album (2006) that Central Station Design, who made the artwork, was influenced by "naïve religious icons and shrines" from territories such as Barbados, with the final creation alluding to the religious imagery of the album's lyrics. The back cover features a painting done by the sister of one of the designers, who had Down syndrome; it had been in the company's offices some years prior. In preparation for an upcoming tour, McGough had the band set up in a rehearsal space in Ancoats. Shaun Ryder was absent from the practices, while Paul Ryder was suffering from a heroin addiction, and Day, Davis, and Whelan were unsure about the future of the band. They embarked on a stint in the UK in October 1992 with support from Stereo MC's; several of the shows sold out in advance, with a handful more being added as a result. Happy Mondays then played a one-off show in Japan with Big Audio Dynamite.

"Sunshine and Love" was released as the second single from the album on 9 November 1992, with a cover of "Stayin' Alive" (1977) by Bee Gees and remixes of "Sunshine and Love" and "24 Hour Party People" as its B-sides. For the artwork, Robertson said the Central Station Design team harkened back to the designs they did for the band's early singles while incorporating the "tactile qualities" of the Yes Please! artwork, such as hand-drawn, cut-out shapes. It was delayed from its initial October 1992 date as Factory was struggling to find a pressing plant that would give them credit. Wilson had corralled about £1,000 to make a music video for "Sunshine and Love". Shaun Ryder refused to leave his band for the filming. The single was released in the US on 18 January 1993, with all of the UK B-sides plus the addition of "Judge Fudge".

Factory Records' deal with London Recordings fell through when a document signed by Factory's directors was found stating that the "musicians own the music and we own nothing", rendering their assets worthless. Their would-be owner withdrew from receivership as a result. Factory went into administration, a decision that was made public on 23 November 1992. As Factory was folding, the Manchester Evening News reported that Happy Mondays were looking for a new record deal. London Recordings attempted to sign the band for a three-album contract, having recently acquired New Order. Happy Mondays had a large debt with the label, stemming from the previous European deal Factory had with them.

=== Potential labels and break-up ===
Elektra Records were looking to extend their contract with the band for another album due to the success of one "Stinkin' Thinkin'" remix in that territory. All of the money the band accrued from the extension would be taken by London to recoup the debt, should they choose to sign with them. A tour of Germany in December 1992 was cancelled. McGough had secured a contract with EMI; in February 1993, the band were in their rehearsal room with Clive Black, a representative from the label. Shaun Ryder announced he was leaving to purchase "Kentucky", a term used for heroin. After several hours without Ryder re-appearing, Black left.

In an attempt to rescue the deal, Black told McGough to have Shaun Ryder meet him in London. After unsuccessful persuasion, Black ended up calling Ryder, telling him he was pulling the deal. Ryder's response was to blame Davis, who had done nothing wrong. Black then told McGough the deal was off; McGough proceeded to call each member to tell them he was quitting. A band meeting was later held with McGough, where Ryder apologized for the situation with EMI. They briefly discussed taking a year-long break; by the meeting's conclusion, Ryder was begging the others to give the band another chance. As they were aware it would be difficult to revive interest from EMI, they broke up.

=== Reissues and related releases ===
Yes Please! was later reissued in 2000 through London Recordings. It was included in Rhino Records' Original Album Series box set in 2013, which collected the band's first four studio albums. The album was re-pressed on vinyl in 2020 alongside their first three albums.

"Stinkin' Thinkin'", "Sunshine and Love", and "Angel" were included on Happy Mondays' first two compilation albums, Double Easy – The U.S. Singles (1993) and Loads (1995). "Stinkin' Thinkin'" appeared alone on their third and fifth compilation albums, Greatest Hits (1999) and Double Double Good: The Best of Happy Mondays (2012). "Stinkin' Thinkin'", "Sunshine and Love", "Cut 'Em Loose Bruce", and "Theme from Netto" featured on the band's fourth compilation album, The Platinum Collection (2005).

== Reception ==
Professional ratings
Review scores
Source	Rating
AllMusic	1.5/5 stars
The Encyclopedia of Popular Music	2/5 stars
The Great Rock Discography	6/10
MusicHound Rock	1/5
NME	6/10
Q	4/5 stars
The New Rolling Stone Album Guide	2/5 stars
Select	2/5
Smash Hits	4/5

Author John Warburton in his book Hallelujah!: The Extraordinary Story of Shaun Ryder and Happy Mondays said Yes Please! was "slammed by the critics as anodyne, uninspired and pedestrian", while author Lisa Verrico in her book High Life 'N' Low Down Dirty: The Thrills and Spills of Shaun Ryder wrote that "[e]ven the weekly press [...] had to concede that ...Yes Please! had its highlights". The staff at Q said the band was "back on the case" and "against all odds, they've pulled it off again". The staff at Melody Maker called it "actually pretty good. At best, we're talking about the oceanic funk of late, late Can; at worst, a typically tropical soundtrack to the Mondays' expensive vacation". The NME said that despite the band's attitude over the preceding two years, "they're back again, unflinching and honest and sick after their own shaggy fashion".

For Trouser Press, Doug Brod and Michael Krugman said that due to the rift between Shaun Ryder and his bandmates, the album "often feels like a document of a band at odds with itself — the sprightly dance tracks clash with Shaun's deeply bent mindfuck wordiness." Doug Iverson of The Blade saw the album as a regression, with the band's energy being compromised by Frantz and Weymouth. Spin's Al Weisel, on the other hand, saw it as a "kinder, gentler" release, aided by the band and Frantz and Weymouth sharing a "similar philosophy: 'Who needs to think when your feet just go?'" Cardew said it was "steeped in age and regret, haunted by a 30-year-old Shaun Ryder who surveys the wreckage of his life and doesn't like what he sees." In a review for Select, journalist Andrew Harrison saw it as "so disappointing", describing it as an "unwieldy collision of beach-barbie niceness with the products of Shaun Ryder's depraved extracurricular activities".

Yes Please! peaked at number 14 in the UK, selling 30,000 copies in its first week of release. By the end of the year, sales stood at 50,000. The album also charted at number 99 in Australia. "Stinkin Thinkin" charted on the US Billboard charts at number 1 on Dance Club Songs, number 15 on Dance Singles Sales, and number 21 on Alternative Airplay. It also appeared at number 31 in the UK. "Sunshine and Love" peaked at number 5 on the Dance Club Songs chart in the US and at number 62 in the UK. Yes Please! was included in Pitchfork's 2010 list of "ten career-killing albums" of the 1990s.

== Track listing ==
All tracks written by Happy Mondays.

1. "Stinkin' Thinkin'" – 4:17
2. "Monkey in the Family" – 4:41
3. "Sunshine and Love" – 4:46
4. "Dustman" – 3:44
5. "Angel" – 5:51
6. "Cut 'Em Loose Bruce" – 4:26
7. "Theme from Netto" – 4:13
8. "Love Child" – 5:12
9. "Total Ringo" – 3:38
10. "Cowboy Dave" – 7:43

== Personnel ==
Personnel per booklet.

Happy Mondays

- Shaun Ryder – vocals
- Paul Ryder – bass guitar
- Mark Day – guitars
- Paul Davis – keyboards
- Gary Whelan – drums
- Bez – dancer

Additional musicians

- Rowetta – backing vocals
- Bruce Martin – percussion, additional programs, samples
- Kermit – additional vocals (track 6)
- Simon Machan – programming and sampling

Production and design

- Chris Frantz – producer
- Tina Weymouth – producer
- Mark Roule – recording
- Bryon Europe – assistant
- Ray Mascarenas – assistant
- Steven Stanley – mixing
- John Parthum – assistant
- Scott Hull – editing, assembling
- Bob Ludwig – mastering
- Central Station Design – art

== Charts ==
Chart performance for Yes Please!
Chart (1992)	Peak position
Australian Albums (ARIA)	99
UK Albums (Official Charts)	14

== See also ==
- It's Great When You're Straight...Yeah – debut album by Ryder's next band Black Grape
- Between 10th and 11th – second album by contemporaries the Charlatans, released after Madchester/baggy's demise
