= Creation Management =

Creation Management was formed by Alan McGee and Simon Fletcher to manage global music artists, launched in Wales in April 2014. The first signing was The Jesus and Mary Chain. The current roster includes Wilko Johnson, Black Grape, Happy Mondays, Shaun Ryder, Cast and Shambolics. The management company has a record label Fetcher Mcgee Ltd that released an unofficial UEFA Euro 2016 record featuring Black Grape, Paul Oakenfold, and Goldie.
