= Reverend Black Grape =

Single by Black Grape

from the album It's Great When You're Straight...Yeah
- Released: 29 May 1995 (UK)
- Recorded: 1995
- Genre: Britpop; funk rock; alternative rock; psychedelic; sampledelia; big beat
- Length: 5:13
- Label: Radioactive; MCA
- Songwriter: Shaun Ryder
- Producers: Danny Saber; Stephen Lironi

Black Grape singles chronology
"Reverend Black Grape" (1995)	"In the Name of the Father" (1995)

Music video
- "Reverend Black Grape" on YouTube

"Reverend Black Grape" is a song by the English alternative dance band Black Grape, released in May 1995. It was the first single to be taken from their debut studio album It's Great When You're Straight...Yeah and peaked at No. 9 on the UK singles chart.

The song was co-produced by Danny Saber and Stephen Lironi. It was written by Shaun Ryder and released by Radioactive Records. The sample "Would he agree that a stately minuet would be preferable to the rain dance" is taken from Sir Thomas Arnold asking a question of John Major in the House of Commons in 1994.

== Lyrics ==
The song caused mild controversy when released because of its assertion that Pope Pius XII collaborated with the Nazis: "Oh Pope he got the Nazis, To clean up their messes, In exchange for gold and paintings, he gave them new addresses". In addition, the song contains a brief audio clip of Adolf Hitler at one of his rallies. The lyrics also borrow from the traditional hymn "O Come, All Ye Faithful".

== Track listing ==
CD Single

1. "Reverend Black Grape" – 5:13
2. "Reverend Black Grape (Dub Collar Mix)" – 5:45
3. "Reverend Black Grape (The Dark Side Mix)" – 4:46

CD Maxi Single

1. "Reverend Black Grape" – 5:13
2. "Straight Out of Trumpton (Basement Tapes)" – 4:06
3. "Reverend Black Grape (The Dark Side Mix)" – 4:46
