= FOK! =

- Website type: Community website
- Owner: Danny Roodbol
- Creator: Danny Roodbol
- Website: fok.nl
- Commercial: Yes
- Registration: No
- Launched: 1999
- Current status: Active

FOK! is a Dutch website and virtual community, containing active content like news, reviews, columns and polls. It was founded by Danny Roodbol, and is one of the largest internet communities of the Netherlands. The forum's user group is diverse, though much of its content is targeted towards a younger audience. Currently over 513,000 accounts have been created and the forum's post count is estimated to be over 222 million.

At its inception, the website gained recognition by being associated with Big Brother. FOK! offered many scoops about the television program and soon visitors of the official Big Brother site were sent to FOK!forum to discuss the show.

== Frontpage ==
The news covered by fok.nl typically consists of important events. It also has room for some lighter and funnier news.

Apart from the general news, FOK! has special sections for news and reviews about videogames, films and sports.
