= Ged Lynch =

English percussionist and composer (born 1968)

- Born: 19 July 1968 (age 58); Blackburn, England
- Occupation: Musician
- Instruments: Drums; percussion
- Years active: 1981–present
- Website: gedlynch.com

Ged Lynch (born 19 July 1968) is an English percussionist and composer.

Lynch had early commercial success drumming with the Ruthless Rap Assassins. In 1989 he joined the Icicle Works. He joined Shaun Ryder and Bez in Black Grape in 1993. They had a series of hit singles and a No. 1 UK hit album with It's Great When You're Straight...Yeah. They split in 1998.

Lynch has worked/recorded with Peter Gabriel, Space, Michael Hutchence, The Charlatans, Agent Provocateur, Joe Strummer, Zucchero, David Sylvian, Vittorio Cosma, Dr. John, Electronic and Joseph Arthur, Natalie Imbruglia, Chrissie Hynde, Eliza and Martin Carthy, Suggs, Shakespear's Sister, Hanson, Tom Jones, Cat Stevens (Yusuf), Birdy, David Rhodes, Jackie Oates and Seth Lakeman.

He has recorded percussion and drums on movie soundtracks, including Jackal, 28 Days Later, Snatch, The Batchelor and Wall-E.

In 2006 he recorded the drums for one of David Gilmour's songs from the album On an Island.

He has recorded and toured with Peter Gabriel on and off since 2002. He toured and recorded in 2008 with Goldfrapp. In 2013 he toured with Birdy and appeared on Clannad's album Nádúr, having previously toured with the band as drummer/percussionist from 2011. In 2016 he toured the US, playing with Peter Gabriel and Sting.
