= Happy Mondays =

English alternative dance band

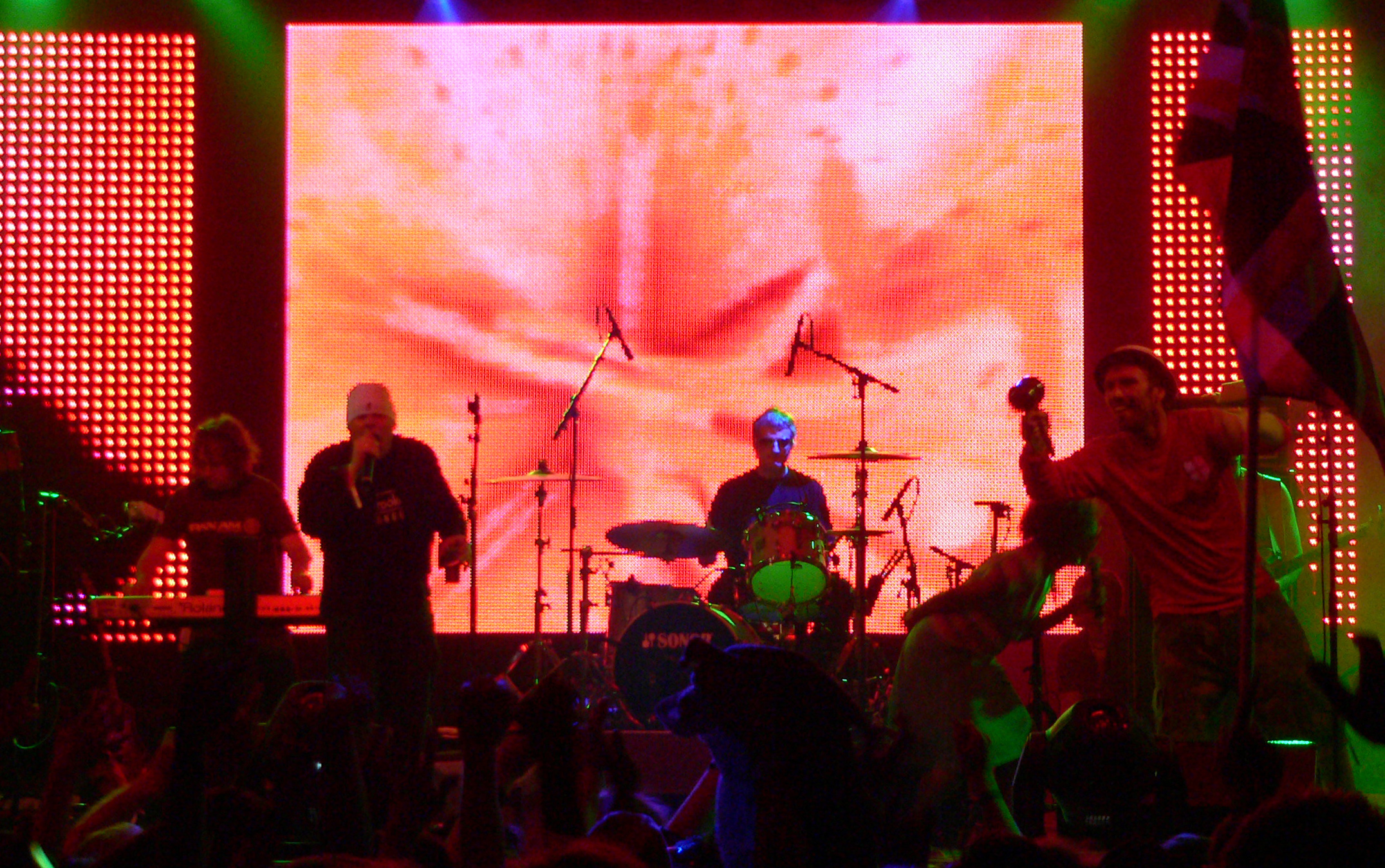
- Happy Mondays performing in 2006

Background information
- Origin: Salford, England
- Genres: Baggy; alternative dance; post-punk; Madchester; neo-psychedelia
- Years active: 1980‍–‍1993; 1999‍–‍2001; 2004‍–‍2010; 2012‍–‍present
- Labels: Factory; Elektra
- Members: Shaun Ryder; Gaz Whelan; Mark "Bez" Berry; Mark Day; Dan Broad
- Past members: Paul Davis; Paul Ryder; Rowetta

Happy Mondays are an English alternative dance band formed in Salford in 1980 by brothers Shaun Ryder (vocals) and Paul Ryder (bass), with Gaz Whelan (drums), Paul Davis (keyboard), and Mark Day (guitar). Mark "Bez" Berry later joined the band onstage as a dancer and maracas player. Rowetta joined the band as a vocalist in 1990, initially credited as a guest vocalist, and performed with them until 1993 and again from 2012 until December 2024. They were originally signed to Tony Wilson's Factory Records label.

The group's work bridged the Manchester alternative dance music of the 1980s and the emerging UK rave scene, drawing influence from funk, house, and psychedelia to pioneer the Madchester sound. They experienced their commercial peak with the releases Bummed (1988), Madchester Rave On (1989), and Pills 'n' Thrills and Bellyaches (1990), with the latter going platinum in the UK. Happy Mondays disbanded in 1993. They reformed several times and released the reunion album Uncle Dysfunktional (2007).

== History ==
=== First incarnation ===
The band were signed to Factory Records after passing a demo tape to Phil Saxe, a trader at Manchester Arndale who was on friendly terms with Mike Pickering, a DJ at the Haçienda nightclub. Saxe became the band's manager.

Their first release was the "Forty Five EP", often called the "Delightful EP" after its first track. It was released on Factory Records in September 1985. Their first album, Squirrel and G-Man Twenty Four Hour Party People Plastic Face Carnt Smile (White Out), was released in 1987 and was produced by John Cale. This was followed by two further albums: Bummed, in 1988, produced by Martin Hannett, and Pills 'n' Thrills and Bellyaches, in 1990, produced by Paul Oakenfold and Steve Osborne. The latter, recorded at Capitol Studios in Los Angeles, went platinum in the UK, selling more than 350,000 copies. Singles "Step On" and "Kinky Afro" from the album both reached number 5 on the UK singles chart.

By the late 1980s, Happy Mondays were an important part of the Manchester music scene and personified rave culture. The line-up of the band during this first and most important ten-year phase never changed, and the six original members Shaun Ryder, Paul Ryder, Gaz Whelan, Paul Davis, Mark Day, and Bez remained a tight unit until the first incarnation came to an end in 1993. Rowetta sang on "Step On" and on Pills 'n' Thrills and Bellyaches tracks including "Kinky Afro" and "Bob's Yer Uncle"; Radio X has described her soulful vocals as an integral part of the band's sound, and Bez said the group was transformed by her arrival: "Overnight, we couldn't imagine ourselves without her." Rowetta shared an agent with the band and had spent months pressing its management to take her on; having recorded "Step On", she was brought on stage for the band's two G-Mex shows in Manchester in March 1990, having met Shaun Ryder only the day before, and later said she had expected to be joining a much smaller band and had not anticipated appearing on Top of the Pops within weeks. Factory Records initially told her it would not be "cost effective" for her to tour, and she won a newspaper competition to join the band's Ibiza dates in the summer of 1990. She went on to sing on Yes Please! and to join the band for three world tours. The band headlined the Friday night at Glastonbury Festival 1990. In November of that year, Paul McCartney commented in NME: "I saw the Happy Mondays on TV, and they reminded me of the Beatles in their 'Strawberry Fields' phase."

Musically, the band fused indie pop guitars with a rhythmic style that owed much to house music, Krautrock, funk, and northern soul. Much of their music was remixed by popular DJs, emphasising the dance influences even further. In style and dress, they crossed hippy fashion and ideals with 1970s glamour. Sartorially and musically, the band helped to encourage the psychedelic revival associated with acid house. One of their most popular songs is "Lazyitis (One Armed Boxer)", featuring a surreal duet between Ryder and Karl Denver. In February 1991, Happy Mondays played in Rock in Rio 2 at the Maracanã Stadium in Rio de Janeiro, Brazil, and went to meet Ronnie Biggs in Brazil with Piers Morgan, who at the time was a writer for The Sun newspaper. The Mondays influenced many bands around the Northwest and beyond, including the Stone Roses, Oasis and the Charlatans. A multi-city US tour followed, with the group returning home early in May 1991. In 1991, they played to 30,000 people at Elland Road, Leeds, said to be Happy Mondays' own Spike Island. By July that year, they revealed details of a fourteen track 'official bootleg' live album, Baby Big Head, recorded at the Elland Road concert. The official record label release, Live followed later in the year.

Yes Please! followed in 1992, produced by Chris Frantz and Tina Weymouth, recorded at Eddy Grant's studio in Barbados. The album was a commercial failure that bankrupted Factory Records.

=== Second incarnation ===
Happy Mondays disbanded in 1993, and Shaun Ryder and Bez formed Black Grape with ex-Paris Angels guitarist "Wags" (who would later go on to serve in the 1999–2000 reincarnation of the Mondays) and ex-Ruthless Rap Assassins star Kermit. Seven years passed, and in 1999 Happy Mondays re-formed, with founding members Shaun Ryder, Paul Ryder, Gaz Whelan and Bez but without Paul Davis and Mark Day. In the place of Day and Davis were Wags and a number of other session musicians including Ben Leach who had once been a member of The Farm, percussionist Lea Mullen, and rapper "Nuts". Also appearing with the new line-up was soul singer Rowetta Satchell (who sang back-up on Pills, Thrills, and Bellyaches, as well as Yes Please!). The band toured extensively in the UK and internationally, selling out the 20,000 capacity Manchester Arena and two nights at Brixton Academy, and released a new single, a cover version of the Thin Lizzy hit "The Boys Are Back in Town". The single reached number 24 in the UK Singles Chart. In 2000, they provided support for Oasis on their Standing on the Shoulder of Giants Tour, played at the Fuji Rock Festival in Japan, at numerous European festivals including T in the Park, and also toured Australia. The band once more ceased their activity in 2001 following the departure of bass player and founding member Paul Ryder.

A fictionalised depiction of Happy Mondays is featured in the 2002 film 24 Hour Party People, with Danny Cunningham as Shaun Ryder and Paul Popplewell as Paul Ryder. Paul Ryder himself had a cameo role in the film as a gangster and Rowetta appeared in the film as herself.

=== Third incarnation ===
2004 saw another re-formation, comprising original members Bez, Gaz and Shaun Ryder along with another group of musicians. Shaun Ryder recruited Kav Sandhu to join on guitar and bring in a new group of musicians. Sandhu brought on-board bassist Mikey Shine, keyboard player Dave Parkinson and guitarist Jonn Dunn. Dave Parkinson was later replaced by Dan Broad. Reviewers continued to treat the reformed group as centring on the three returning original members; reviewing Uncle Dysfunktional, Uncut described the band as "a three-piece comprising Shaun, Bez and Gaz". Sandhu, who spent four years touring with the band, left in 2007 to pursue a solo career. Backing singers on the first tour were Angie Brown and Ron Carroll. from 2004 to 2006 the band were managed by Danny Newman, MD at London Club Turnmills brother of London Club DJ Tall Paul. Rowetta was replaced by Julie E. Gordon who toured with the band until 2010. Paul Ryder was not present, having sworn to never perform with his brother again following the 2000 break-up, and formed his own band Big Arm. That year, the Happy Mondays released a live DVD of a show in Barcelona. They played a variety of festival dates in 2005 (including Global Gathering), capping it off with a concert at the Manchester Arena.

In June 2006, Happy Mondays performed in Liverpool, and on 30 July 2006 they were special guests at the Fuji Rock Festival. In August 2006, the band announced that they had completed their first album in fourteen years, with producers Sunny Levine and Howie B, and had signed to Sanctuary Records. A single "Playground Superstar", from the soundtrack for the football film Goal!, was released a few months prior to completion of the new album, Uncle Dysfunktional released in mid-2007. on Noel Gallagher's label Big Brother Records.

Happy Mondays performed before another re-formed act, Rage Against the Machine, at the 2007 Coachella Music Festival in Indio, California. They were introduced by Tony Wilson. Bez missed the show because he could not get into the US due to "passport issues". The band then toured throughout the summer of 2007 including a trip to the Numusic Festival in Norway. They played Splendour in the Grass in Australia in July 2009, and the UK V Festival in August 2009.

Happy Mondays toured the US and Canada with the Psychedelic Furs in late 2009 with Paul Ryder's son and Shaun Ryder's nephew Jake Ryder filling in for Gaz Whelan on drums.

Happy Mondays appeared at the Wizard Festival in northeast Scotland in August 2010.

This version of the band continued until 2010. Members Mikey Shine, Jonn Dunn & Dan Broad continued to back Shaun Ryder for his solo tour until 2011, surrounding the release of his autobiography.

=== Fourth incarnation ===
On 29 January 2012, Shaun Ryder announced on radio station Xfm that the band would return with the original and definitive lineup of himself, his brother Paul on bass, Whelan on drums, Rowetta on vocals, Day on guitar, Davis on keyboards and dancer Mark Berry. They appeared on ITV's This Morning and were interviewed by Phillip Schofield. Shaun Ryder pronounced that amends had been made, friendships reinstated and that it was just like the old days, but without the madness. They did a 13-date UK tour in May 2012, most of which were sold out, and an extra date was added at London's Brixton Academy due to the demand for tickets. The tour included other shows at the Manchester Arena, plus other dates in Bournemouth, Glasgow, Dublin, Leeds, Sheffield and Nottingham. To coincide with the band's reunion tour, a greatest hits album, Double Double Good was released in July 2012, as well as a live recording of the band's May 2012 gig in Brixton. The band went on to play concerts in Chile and Argentina in May 2012 and then a number of European festivals in the summer of 2012, including Ireland's Sea Sessions, Scotland's T in the Park, the band were headliners at Camp Bestival in Dorset in July 2012 and they performed at the V Festivals in August 2012. They then travelled to Mallorca and Ibiza to play the Ibiza and Mallorca Rocks events.

Happy Mondays announced in September 2012 that they were writing their first album with the original lineup in more than 20 years.

The band played two nights at the Roundhouse, London and in Manchester in December 2012. They travelled to Dubai in April 2013 to perform and in May 2013 played gigs at Bristol's Vegfest and one in Brighton. June 2013 brought gigs at the Isle of Wight Festival and Scarborough, then in July 2013 they played at the Warrington Music Festival and at Sandown Park Racecourse in Esher, Surrey. They played dates in Belfast, Crewe and Dublin in August 2013. In October 2013 they travelled to Spain to do concerts in Barcelona and Madrid. Then, in November 2013, they started a 16-date UK tour to celebrate 25 years since their second critically acclaimed album Bummed was released, and the band planned to play most of the songs from the album. The band signed to Warren Askew & Oliver Moheda at Total Artist Management in 2010 and Creation Management in 2015 for management. They announced an international tour to coincide with the 25th anniversary of the Pills 'n' Thrills and Bellyaches.

In September 2015, the programme Singing in the Rainforest followed Happy Mondays as they travelled to Panama to record a new song with an isolated tribe called the Emberá. The band composed a track with members of the tribe for a performance, penning the track "Ooo La La to Panama". Although billed as the first original line-up recording since 1992, Paul Davis was not present, and no mention of him was made. Gaz Whelan confirmed on Twitter that Davis had left the band.

The band toured Australia and New Zealand in February and March 2019, performing Pills 'n' Thrills and Bellyaches. The touring line-up for these dates was Shaun Ryder, Bez, Rowetta, Mark Day, Gary Whelan and Dan Broad, with Paul Ryder on bass.

On 15 July 2022, Happy Mondays announced via their Facebook page that Paul Ryder had died in the early hours of that morning. He was 58 years old.

In August 2023, Happy Mondays opened a three-band bill with Primal Scream and Noel Gallagher's High Flying Birds at the Royal Hospital Kilmainham in Dublin, performing a set drawn mainly from Pills 'n' Thrills and Bellyaches. Bez did not perform, and Alfonso Buller took his place as onstage dancer.

In March 2024, the band embarked on a UK tour, billed as the Been There Done That Tour, with Inspiral Carpets and Stereo MCs as special guests; the line-up was Shaun Ryder, Bez, Rowetta, Mark Day, Gary Whelan and Dan Broad. Prior to the tour, frontman Shaun Ryder stated that the band would be on hiatus for a few years following the tour.

On 23 December 2024, Happy Mondays and Rowetta issued a joint statement announcing that she would no longer be performing with the band, ending an association of 34 years; the band thanked her "for her services".

In September 2025, the band announced a UK & Ireland tour for March and April 2026 to celebrate 35 years since the release of Pills 'n' Thrills and Bellyaches, with The Farm and Northside as support acts.

| Year | Song title | Album | Label |
|---|---|---|---|
| 1988: | "Wrote for Luck" | Bummed | Factory Records |
| 1989: | "Hallelujah" | Madchester Rave On EP | Factory Records |
| 1990: | "God's Cop" | Pills 'n' Thrills and Bellyaches | Factory Records |

== Awards and nominations ==
| Year | Awards | Work | Category | Result |
|---|---|---|---|---|
| 1989 | NME Awards | "WFL" | Best Dance Record | Won |
| 1990 | NME Awards | Pills 'n' Thrills and Bellyaches | Best LP | Won |
| 1990 | NME Awards | Themselves | Best Band | Won |
| 1990 | Smash Hits Poll Winners Party | Themselves | Best Band | Nominated |
| 1990 | Smash Hits Poll Winners Party | Themselves | Best New Act | Nominated |
| 1991 | Smash Hits Poll Winners Party | Themselves | Best Indie Group | Won |
| 1991 | Brit Awards | Themselves | Best British Newcomer | Nominated |
| 1991 | Brit Awards | Themselves | Best British Group | Nominated |
| 2004 | UK Festival Awards | Themselves | Most Memorable Moment | Nominated |
| 2007 | UK Festival Awards | Themselves | Festival Feel-Good Act | Nominated |
| 2010 | UK Festival Awards | Wychwood Festival | Best Headline Performance | Nominated |
| 2013 | Q Awards | Bummed | Q Classic Album | Won |
| 2016 | Ivor Novello Awards | Themselves | The Ivor's Inspiration Award | Won |

== Members ==
Current members

- Shaun Ryder – lead vocals, tambourine (1980–1993, 1999–2001, 2004–2010, 2012–present)
- Mark "Bez" Berry – dancer, maracas (1985–1993, 1999–2001, 2004–2010, 2012–present)
- Gary "Gaz" Whelan – drums (1980–1993, 1999–2001, 2006–2008, 2012–present)
- Mark "Cow" Day – guitar (1980–1993, 2012–present)
- Dan Broad – keyboards, samples, programming, musical director (2006–2010, 2016–present)

Former members

- Paul Ryder – bass, keyboards (1980–1993, 1999–2001, 2012–2022; his death)
- Paul Davis – keyboards, samples, programming (1980–1993, 2012–2015)
- Rowetta – vocals, percussion (1990–1993, 2012–2024)

Former touring and session musicians

- Paul "Wags" Wagstaff (ex-Paris Angels) – guitar (1999–2000)
- Ben Leach – keyboards (1999–2000)
- Lea Mullen – percussion (1999–2000)
- "Nuts" – rap vocals (1999–2000)
- Kav Sandhu – guitar (2004–2007)
- Mikey Shine – bass (2004–2010)
- Jonn Dunn – guitar (2004–2010)
- Dave Parkinson – keyboards (2004–2006)
- Julie E. Gordon – vocals (2004–2010)
- Jake Ryder – drums (2009)

== Discography ==
- Squirrel and G-Man Twenty Four Hour Party People Plastic Face Carnt Smile (White Out) (1987)
- Bummed (1988)
- Pills 'n' Thrills and Bellyaches (1990)
- Yes Please! (1992)
- Uncle Dysfunktional (2007)

== Live ==
Front - Original Ticket

See also

- List of number-one dance hits (United States)
- List of artists who reached number one on the US Dance chart
