= Ruthless Rap Assassins =

British rap group

The Ruthless Rap Assassins were a UK rap group from Hulme, Manchester, England. The group was formed by MC Kermit La Freak (later simply Kermit - real name Paul Leveridge) and brothers Dangerous Hinds (real name Anderson Hinds) and Dangerous C (real name Carson Hinds).

== History ==
Kermit grew up in Moss Side, Manchester - where he learnt to play violin at the age of 6 - and was briefly a DJ under the name of 'DJ la Freak', whilst doing a psychology degree at Manchester Polytechnic. He joined the breakdance crew Broken Glass, who moved into making records with "Style of the Street" following a meeting with Manchester DJ and producer Greg Wilson. The song was recorded for the Street Sounds Electro UK (Street Sounds, 1984) album, but the label owner Morgan Khan was impressed with their work and persuaded them to record more tunes for the album. In order to give the impression of a thriving British hip hop scene, the songs were recorded under a variety of aliases: in truth, of the seven tracks on the album, only one was not recorded by Broken Glass.

Kermit met the Hinds brothers - at the time calling themselves the Dangerous 2 - and together they decided to form the Assassins, with Greg Wilson staying with them as a producer. Their first release was the single "We Don't Kare" (Murdertone, 1987), which had as a B-side a song by Kiss AMC - an all-female Manchester rap group that featured Christine "Kiss" Leveridge, Kermit's sister. They followed this with two singles entirely of their own, "The Meltdown Session" (Murdertone, 1988) and "The Drone Session EP" (Murdertone, 1989) - in between which, Dangerous C performed a rap for a B-side remix of Kym Mazelle's "Useless (I Don't Need You Now)" (Syncopate, 1988).

Following this, the group released Killer Album (Murdertone/EMI, 1990). The album was a mixture of social commentary ("Justice (Just Us)") and more comical tunes ("Jealous MC" or a high-octane cover of The Coaster's "Yakety Yak"). It yielded two minor hit singles in "Just Mellow" and "And It Wasn't A Dream" (a duet with Tracey Carmen). The album received critical praise - UK hip hop magazine Hip Hop Connection (February 1991, No. 25) called it "the best rap album the UK had ever produced" - and even managed to get the single "And It Wasn't A Dream" (Murdertone/EMI, 1990) terrestrial television airplay. But despite making an impact within the scene, and getting crucial support from John Peel at BBC Radio 1 the album failed to translate this into sales. This album was reissued with extra tracks by Original Dope/Cherry Red in October 2010.

Trying again, the group went back to the studio to record their second album Th!nk, It Ain't Illegal Yet, introducing live percussion from Ged Lynch to their usual mix of social commentary ("No Tale, No Twist" told the story of life growing up in Manchester's urban slums, whilst "Down and Dirty" was a sex rhyme featuring "guest vocals" from Jealous MC). Again, the album was liked by the critics and the industry - BBC Television had Dangerous C on an edition of Blue Peter to demonstrate the techniques of sampling and plug the album - but again, this good reception was not reflected in sales. The group split up shortly afterwards.

Soon after the Assassins' split, Kermit and Ged joined Shaun Ryder to form the group Black Grape and earned pop success with them, before leaving the band after suffering from sepsis and being replaced by Psycho. Since then, Kermit has released records as Manmade and made guest appearances on other artists' songs, such as Bentley Rhythm Ace. His more recent project was Big Dog with Ged from Black Grape. Anderson Hinds left the music industry and worked as a teacher - although in a 2000 interview, Kermit mentioned that the two of them were considering making more tunes together. Ged Lynch became a session musician.

== Discography ==
=== Albums ===
- The Killer Album (EMI, 1990)
- Th!nk, It Ain't Illegal Yet (EMI, 1991)
- The Killer Album - The 20th Anniversary Edition (EMI/Original Dope/Cherry Red, 2010)

=== Singles ===
- "Just Mellow" (1990) - UK No. 75
- "And It Wasn't a Dream" (1990) - UK No. 75

== See also ==
- MC Tunes
