= Black Grape =

English dance band

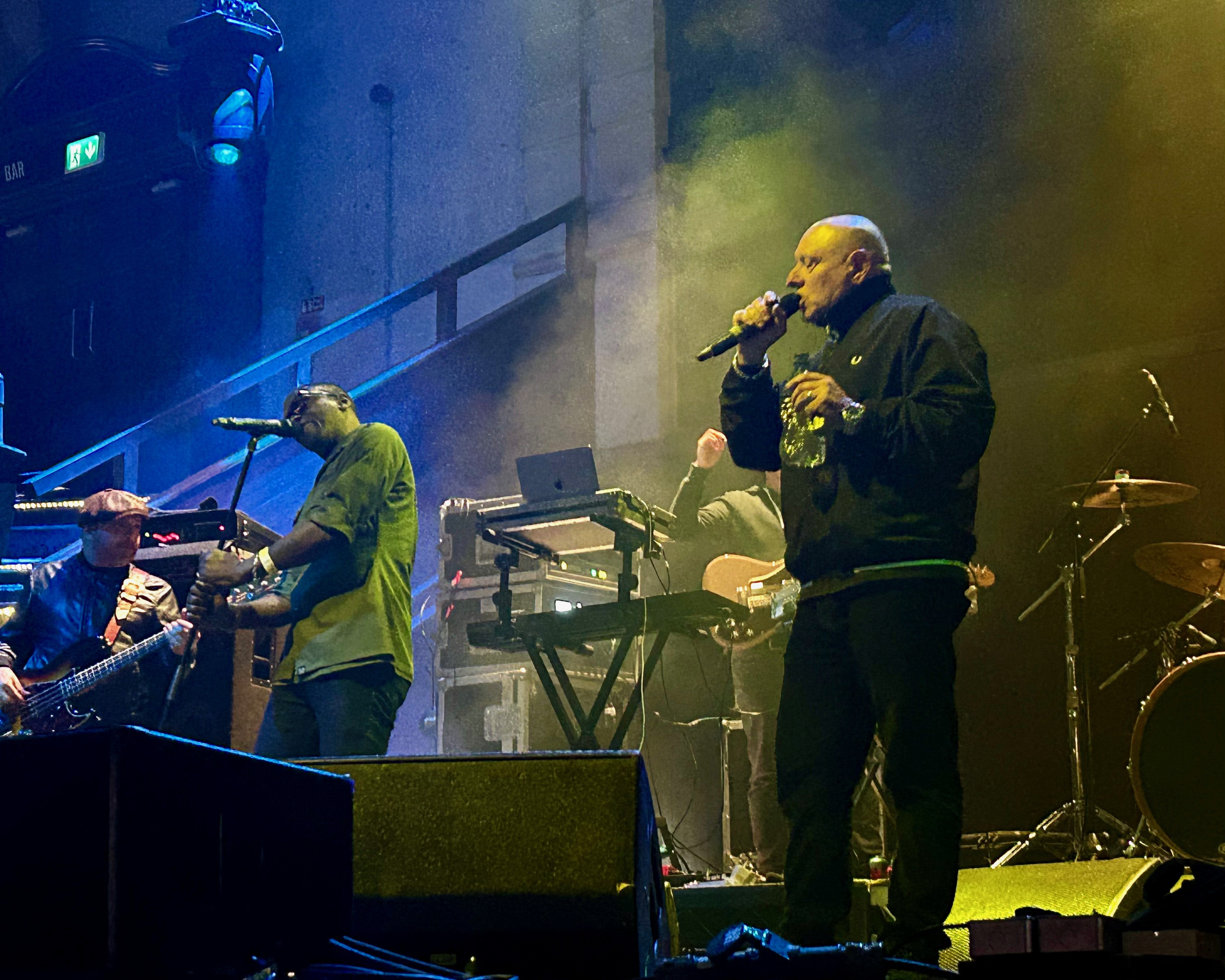
- Black Grape performing at the Albert Hall in Manchester, 2023

Background information
- Origin: Salford, Greater Manchester, England
- Genres: Alternative dance; alternative rock; funk rock; Madchester; Britpop
- Years active: 1993–1998; 2010; 2015–present
- Labels: Radioactive; UMC
- Members: Kermit; Shaun Ryder
- Past members: Ged Lynch; Psycho; Danny Williams; Danny Saber; Wags 𐠒; Bez
- Website: Official Facebook page

Black Grape are an English alternative dance band formed in Salford in 1993, featuring former members of Happy Mondays and the Ruthless Rap Assassins. Their musical style fuses funk and electronic rock with electronic programming and samples.

== History ==
=== Formation, first two studio albums and break-up (1993–1998) ===
The band was formed in 1993 by former Happy Mondays members Shaun Ryder and Bez. It was Ryder's first musical project after the disintegration of Happy Mondays due both to his multiple drug addictions and to disagreements about revenues with other band members. The formation of the new band was intended to draw a line between his past life and his new one. Ryder and Bez recruited rappers Paul "Kermit" Leveridge and Carl "Psycho" McCarthy, drummer Ged Lynch (like Leveridge, a former member of Ruthless Rap Assassins), and guitarist Wags (formerly of the Manchester-based group Paris Angels) and Oli "Dirtycash" Dillon on ocarina. Recording of new material started that year, although the group was not under contract.

In 1995, Black Grape were signed by Radioactive Records (an imprint of major label BMG) and released its debut studio album It's Great When You're Straight...Yeah. The album debuted at number one in the UK Albums Chart, and spawned three top 20 singles. The album was certified platinum in the UK in April 1996.

The third single, "Kelly's Heroes" – a song lampooning society's obsession with celebrities and idols that had much to do with Ryder's own previous hero worship of people he now saw as wastrels – had its opening lyric changed before recording from "Don't talk to me about heroes – Most of these guys snort cocaine," to "Don't talk to me about heroes – most of these men sink like subs". Another song on the album, "Temazi Party", mocked the then-current craze for abusing temazepam sleeping pills (a.k.a. 'jellies'), but was deliberately misspelt on the album sleeve as 'Tramazi' instead of 'Temazi' to forestall any legal injunction against the album's release.

The subsequent studio album Stupid Stupid Stupid was less commercially successful, but was certified gold in the UK in January 1998. The group broke-up in 1998 after Ryder fired the rest of the band while touring, starting with Kermit (who was suffering from septicaemia) and ending with Bez (who was unsatisfied with his financial situation).

Lynch went on to play drums and percussion on many other musical works, becoming a noted session musician.

=== Reunion (2010–present) ===
On 1 April 2010, Ryder briefly reformed Black Grape with producer Danny Saber for a concert as part of the 'Get Loaded in the Dark' gig series at The Coronet in London.

In 2015, Black Grape reunited for a gig in April at the Old Granada Studios in Manchester. The gig was a benefit for Bez's political party, We Are the Reality Party, which coincided with his bid for Parliament in the upcoming general election. Although Ryder and Kermit took to the stage, Bez joined them on stage towards the end of the gig. Soon after, it was announced that Black Grape had signed to Creation Management run by Alan McGee and Simon Fletcher and announced a reunion tour to coincide with 20 years of the band's debut studio album It's Great When You're Straight...Yeah (1995). Although an original member, Bez did not rejoin the band.

Black Grape recorded and released a song "We Are England" in support of the England national football team for the UEFA Euro 2016 football competition, in collaboration with DJ Paul Oakenfold and singer Goldie, under the name 4 Lions. It was released by the management label Fletcher McGee Ltd under license to BMG Rights Management.

On 4 May 2017, it was announced that the group's next studio album, Pop Voodoo would be released on 7 July. On the same day, "Everything You Know Is Wrong" was released. The album was eventually released on 4 August. Louder Than War listed the album as one of its top 100 albums of 2017, placing it high at #23.

In September 2021, Black Grape went on the road to celebrate the 25th anniversary of their debut studio album – originally planned for 2020, but the COVID-19 pandemic saw the original shows rescheduled

Orange Head, the band's fourth album, was scheduled for release in November 2023, preceded by the single "Milk". Instead the single "Dirt" was released in November, and the album pushed back to January 2024.

Orange Head was released on 19 January 2024.

Wags died in March 2025.

== Discography ==
=== Studio albums ===
| Title | Album details | Peak chart positions | | | | | | Certifications |
| Title | Album details | UK | AUS | CAN | NZ | SCO | SWE | Certifications |
|---|---|---|---|---|---|---|---|---|
| It's Great When You're Straight...Yeah | Released: 7 August 1995; Label: Radioactive (RAR 11224); Formats: CD, CS, DL, LP | 1 | 111 | 80 | 20 | 2 | 13 | UK: Platinum |
| Stupid Stupid Stupid | Released: 10 November 1997; Label: Radioactive (RAR 11716); Formats: CD, CS, DL, LP | 11 | 139 | — | — | 10 | 40 | UK: Gold |
| Pop Voodoo | Released: 4 August 2017; Label: UMC; Formats: CD, DL, LP | 15 | — | — | — | 8 | — | |
| Orange Head | Released: 19 January 2024; Label: DGAFF; Formats: CD, DL, LP | 78 | — | — | — | 5 | — | |
"—" denotes items that did not chart or were not released in that territory.

=== Singles ===
| Year | Title | Peak chart positions | | | | | Album |
| Year | Title | UK | UK Dance | AUS | SCO | US Alt. | Album |
|---|---|---|---|---|---|---|---|
| 1995 | "Reverend Black Grape" | 9 | — | — | 5 | — | It's Great When You're Straight...Yeah |
| 1995 | "In the Name of the Father" | 8 | — | 107 | 5 | 31 | It's Great When You're Straight...Yeah |
| 1995 | "Kelly's Heroes" | 17 | — | 158 | 13 | — | It's Great When You're Straight...Yeah |
| 1996 | "Fat Neck" | 10 | — | — | 6 | — | Non-album singles |
| 1996 | "England's Irie" | 6 | — | — | 19 | — | Non-album singles |
| 1997 | "Get Higher" | 24 | — | 177 | 12 | — | Stupid Stupid Stupid |
| 1998 | "Marbles" | 46 | 39 | — | 44 | — | Stupid Stupid Stupid |
| 2017 | "Nine Lives" | — | — | — | — | — | Pop Voodoo |
| 2017 | "I Wanna Be Like You" | — | — | — | — | — | Pop Voodoo |
| 2023 | "Pimp Wars" | — | — | — | — | — | Orange Head |
| 2023 | "Milk" | — | — | — | — | — | Orange Head |
| 2023 | "Dirt" | — | — | — | — | — | Orange Head |
"—" denotes items that did not chart or were not released in that territory.

=== Promotional singles ===
- 1997 – "Dadi Waz a Badi"

=== Film ===
- The Grape Tapes (1997)
