= Danny Saber =

American musician and producer (born 1966)

- Born: 1966 (age 59–60)
- Origin: Los Angeles, California, U.S.
- Genres: Trip hop; electronica
- Occupations: Musician; audio engineer; record producer; remixer
- Instruments: Guitar; bass; organ; keyboards

Danny Saber (born 1966) is an American musician, audio engineer, record producer, and remixer. He is a former member of Black Grape and Agent Provocateur. He plays guitar, bass, organ, and keyboards.

Saber is known for diversity in his production and remixing. The genres of the artists with whom he has worked have included pop (Madonna, Seal), rock (David Bowie, U2, Michael Hutchence, the Rolling Stones), heavy metal (Ozzy Osbourne, Korn, Marilyn Manson), hip-hop (Busta Rhymes, Public Enemy, Jadakiss). Saber co-produced and performed on Alice Cooper's Along Came a Spider album, and has songwriting credits on eight of the eleven songs on the album. He has scored film music and contributed music to a wide range of films (Blade II, Moulin Rouge!, Dallas 362, The Limey, Played).

In 1999, Saber worked with Jack Dangers of Meat Beat Manifesto to form a project named Spontaneous Human Combustion. The project was unusual in that it was among the earliest to make and release music entirely online for free without the involvement of a music label.

Saber was also a judge for the seventth annual Independent Music Awards to support independent artists' careers.
