= Pills 'n' Thrills and Bellyaches =

Studio album by Happy Mondays
- Released: 5 November 1990
- Recorded: February 1990; July–September 1990
- Studios: Capitol (Los Angeles); Eden (London)
- Genres: Madchester; baggy; rock; dance-rock
- Length: 43:49
- Label: Factory
- Producers: Paul Oakenfold; Steve Osborne

Happy Mondays chronology
Hallelujah (1989)	Pills 'n' Thrills and Bellyaches (1990)	Yes Please! (1992)

Singles from Pills 'n' Thrills and Bellyaches
- 1. "Step On" Released: 26 March 1990; 2. "Kinky Afro" Released: 8 October 1990; 3. "Loose Fit" Released: 25 February 1991; 4. "Bob's Yer Uncle" Released: April 1991 (US only)

Pills 'n' Thrills and Bellyaches is the third studio album by the English alternative dance band Happy Mondays, released on 5 November 1990 by Factory Records. Disc jockey (DJ) Paul Oakenfold and collaborator Steve Osborne were previously enlisted by the band for remixes. The success of these led to the pair producing "Step On", a cover of the John Kongos song, for Happy Mondays. The band went on a tour of the United States, and by the end of which, had started recording their next album with Oakenfold and Osborne at Capitol Studios in Los Angeles, California. They returned to the United Kingdom, where further recording took place at Eden Studios in London until September 1990. Described as a Madchester album, Pills 'n' Thrills and Bellyaches saw substantial input from Oakenfold and Osborne, with the former making loops while the latter handled song arrangements.

The release of Pills 'n' Thrills and Bellyaches was aided by a distribution and licensing deal between Factory Records and major label London Recordings. "Kinky Afro" was released as the second single from the album on 8 October 1990; the album was promoted with an arena tour in the UK, with support from Donovan, to close out the year. Preceded by festival appearances in the UK and Brazil, "Loose Fit" was released as the album's third single in February 1991. Treks in mainland Europe and the US followed over the course of the next three months. After this, touring continued into August 1991 across a variety of festival performances and headlining shows.

Pills 'n' Thrills and Bellyaches received generally positive reviews from music critics, several of whom considered it the band's creative peak. It peaked at number four on the UK Albums Chart, as well as charting in Austria, New Zealand, and Sweden. The album went on to sell 400,000 copies in the UK, where it was certified platinum. "Step On" reached the top five in the UK (where it would be certified gold) and appeared on several Billboard charts in the US. "Kinky Afro" had similar success, also reaching the top five in the UK (where it would be certified silver). "Loose Fit" charted in the UK top 20; "Bob's Yer Uncle" peaked within the top 30 on two US charts. Pills 'n' Thrills and Bellyaches appeared on album of the year and best of decade lists by Melody Maker, NME, and Select.

== Background ==
Happy Mondays released their second studio album, Bummed, which was produced by Martin Hannett, in November 1988. To promote it, the band supported James and Pixies on separate tours as well as headlining treks of their own in the United Kingdom. The album's lead single, "Wrote for Luck", became the defining track of the acid house era. Scott Plagenhoef of Stylus considered the album "the perfect summation of the 1988 British Summer of Love". "Wrote for Luck" was remixed by DJ Paul Oakenfold, with assistance from Steve Osborne and Vince Clarke of Erasure. The remixes, under the name "W.F.L.", appeared in September 1989, peaking at number 68 on the UK Singles Chart. Happy Mondays' second extended play (EP), Madchester Rave On, was released in November 1989, again produced by Hannett. It peaked at number 19 on the UK Singles Chart.

Oakenfold and Osborne were enlisted again to create remixes, which were successful commercially and critically. Around this time, the band appeared on Top of the Pops with the Stone Roses, which acted as a catalyst for the Madchester scene. Relationships between band members became strained, while manager Nathan McGough spent more time partying than assisting them. Frontman Shaun Ryder was especially disconnected from the others, using heroin as a crutch. In February 1990, Happy Mondays' label in the United States, Elektra Records, picked them to contribute a cover for a 40th anniversary compilation album. Happy Mondays initially considered doing a Tom Waits track, until someone suggested John Kongos; they recorded Kongos' "He's Gonna Step on You Again" (1971) at Eden Studios in London. At the suggestion of McGough, Oakenfold and Osborne produced the song, marking the first time either of them did so.

Unbeknownst to Happy Mondays, Oakenfold and Osborne added vocals from session vocalist Rowetta, who had met McGough some weeks earlier at the Haçienda in Manchester. As the band thought their cover would be wasted on the Elektra compilation, they gave the label a rendition of another Kongos song, its follow-up "Tokoloshe Man" (1971). In March 1990, they embarked on a tour of mainland Europe, leading into two headlining shows at the GMEX Centre in Manchester. The band's version of Kongos' track, shortened to "Step On", was released as a single on 26 March 1990. The song's music video was filmed while in Barcelona on the roof of a hotel with directors the Bailey Brothers. The band set up in a rehearsal room in Stretford to write material for their next album. Following this, the band headlined Glastonbury Festival and played a one-off show in Ibiza in June 1990. They embarked on a tour of the US in July 1990.

== Recording ==
As the US tour came to a close in Los Angeles, California, the band decided to record their next album in the city. Shaun Ryder considered it an important break away from being constantly recognised in the UK, which the rest of the band agreed with. Other recording locations had been floated and declined, such as in Amsterdam and Barbados. An extra US show was scheduled but cancelled in order for the members to get into the right head space for recording. Due to the success of "Step On", Oakenfold and Osborne had been earmarked to produce Happy Mondays' next release sometime prior. Elektra and Factory Records, the band's UK label, booked the band to record at Capitol Studios. Upon entering it, the band had a week's time to record the seven new songs they had; they convinced both labels to extend recording by three weeks. Oakenfold and Osborne sorted through the various demos the band had given the pair, picking the ones that would work well and those that would not.

As the band would hang out with Mancunian and Liverpudlian people from acid house club nights in the area, the strained relationships were sedated. They stayed at the Oakwood Apartments with their girlfriends and wives. Recording started on 23 July 1990; the sessions would begin at midday and conclude by midnight, lasting for six days per week, with engineer Ray Blair and studio assistant Cameron. Bassist Paul Ryder and drummer Gary Whelan would record their parts together, while the others would record theirs separately to avoid cabin fever. The first track they recorded was "Kinky Afro", with bass and drums that Osborne laboured over to get a certain baggy sound. Whelan would often record drum loops and record new parts on top of them. A similar instance saw Whelan play over loops that Oakenfold made by scratching his records on "God's Cop". Due to band member Bez's lacklustre skills as a percussionist, session musician Tony Castro was brought in by Blair to contribute to "Loose Fit" and "Bob's Yer Uncle".

Spurred on by the laidback nature of the sessions, the band attempted a cover of "Everybody's Talkin'" (1966) by Fred Neil. With the guidance of Oakenfold, they kept the feel of the song while scrapping everything else, eventually causing the band to write "Bob's Yer Uncle". Shaun Ryder would attempt to get out of recording vocals frequently, claiming he was not in the right mood. Osborne had to talk him into the idea. As Osbourne learned from working on "Step On", Ryder was "not somebody who is a super-confident vocalist. Doing vocals for Shaun [Ryder] is not an easy thing". Ryder would subsequently only do vocals when Osborne was in the control room, aside from the occasional visit from Whelan. Factory founder Tony Wilson visited the band, fearing they would have spent the entirety of recording partying instead of working. Upon hearing a version of "Bob's Yer Uncle", he exclaimed that the band's next release would be "one of the great British albums of the age". The band flew home on 25 August 1990; one-by-one, each member did further work on the songs at Eden Studios, where Rowetta did guest vocals. Recording concluded by September 1990; Oakenfold and Osborne mixed the final tracks with assistant engineer Dave Burnham.

== Composition and lyrics ==
Musically, the sound of Pills 'n' Thrills and Bellyaches has been described as Madchester. According to the writer John Harris, it is slicker than Bummed and makes the band's affinities with acid house more explicit, mixing guitar and bass with "precise and pristine keyboard sounds" and drums that are "as crisp as on any house record". With the title, Shaun Ryder said the band wanted a "mature, a rock classic title, but we thought fuck it, just give it something that everyone's expecting". Oakenfold and Osborne had more input into the music than other people would, as the band trusted them. Oakenfold said Osborne had a bigger role in the overall sound of the album due to being a multi-instrumentalist. The former focused on making loops, while the latter tackled song arrangements with synthesisers and keyboards. All of the songs' sound is buoyed by Paul Ryder's bass parts, which Osborne felt were important to the band's dynamic. He had a laissez-faire attitude to his performances, even letting Osborne play bass on one track. Osborne felt guitarist Mark Day's parts anchored a lot of the songs, often setting the tone for them. They initially wanted "Tokoloshe Man" (1971), another Kongos cover, on the album, but were denied it when they contributed it to Elektra's anniversary compilation in lieu of "Step On".

Shaun Ryder wrote the lyrics to the songs while in his apartment in Los Angeles, fuelled by opium. The album opens with "Kinky Afro", an ode to fatherhood and Ryder's father, Derek. The song's music is partially influenced by Paul Ryder listening to Hot Chocolate, namely their song "Brother Louie" (1973). Shaun Ryder took one of its lines for "Kinky Afro"; despite comparisons to "Lady Marmalade" (1974) by Labelle, he claimed the song's vocal hook was taken from the film Die Hard (1988). The song was initially called "Groovy Afro", but was changed after "Groovy Train" (1990) by the Farm was released sometime prior. "God's Cop" is inspired by James Anderton, the chief constable of the Greater Manchester Police, who claimed God was speaking to him. It opens with a slide guitar part, leading into a delta blues riff that is heard throughout the rest of the track; it is backed by a drum loop of "Me Myself and I" (1989) by De La Soul. "Donovan", which musically retreads "Mad Cyril" from Bummed, was written after the band was listening to Donovan's back catalogue while touring the US. It borrows a lyric from Donovan's "Sunshine Superman" (1966).

"Loose Fit" is the result of jamming between Paul Ryder and Oakenfold; the song describes how one approaches life. In addition to this, some of the lyrics talk about the Gulf War and its events being reported on TV. "Grandbag's Funeral" is centred around a guitar riff, reminiscent of the one heard in "Diamond Dogs" (1974) by David Bowie. "Dennis and Lois" is named after a couple the band befriended upon visiting New York City for the first time. It includes a reference to The Profession of Violence by John Pearson, a book about the Kray twins. The music was influenced by "Superstition" (1972) by Stevie Wonder. "Bob's Yer Uncle" is about dirty talking during sex, the music of which was influenced by the theme song to Daktari, according to Ryder. It includes a line from "Why Did You Do It?" (1975) by Stretch and samples a clarinet part from a Michael Nyman composition. The track originally had extracts from The Exorcist (1973) and numerous pornographic films that were removed before the album was released.

Kongos' "Step On" is a protest song that deals with white people's appropriation of land in Africa. Happy Mondays' version opens with an Italo house piano, followed by a funk shuffle. Shaun Ryder ad-libbed various lines, such as "Call the cops" and "You're twisting my melon man". The former was a catchphrase of a Haçienda patron, while the latter was taken from a line of dialogue in Man on the Edge, a documentary about Steve McQueen. Ryder had guessed some of the lyrics as he did not have a lyric sheet in front of him, which he re-recorded after learning what they were. "Holiday" incorporates a portion of "Sweet Jane" (1973) by the Velvet Underground, as well as "A Lover's Holiday" (1980) by Change. Ryder wrote the song about issues he faced when dealing with customs officers. For "Harmony", Ryder attempted to get Whelan to sing the track in the same manner that the Beatles would get their drummer Ringo Starr to sing a song. The song describes being high on the rave drug ecstasy. It lifts a lyric from "I'd Like to Teach the World to Sing (In Perfect Harmony)" (1971) by the New Seekers.

== Release ==
McGough set about making Happy Mondays' next album a success; he was concerned with Factory's ad hoc licencing agreements, finding it difficult to obtain sales numbers from Rough Trade Records in Germany. With an advance from Wilson, McGough set up a distribution and licencing deal with major label London Recordings, which would promote the album throughout the European continent. BMG had turned down an offer to distribute the band due to their "interests outside of their musical output". During this time, the UK press noted a decline in the popularity of the Madchester scene. McGough wanted "Kinky Afro" as the next single, while Wilson aimed for "Loose Fit". "Kinky Afro" was ultimately released as the second single from the album on 8 October 1990. A radio mix and a live version of the same song were included as B-sides. The music video for the song, directed by the Bailey Brothers, was filmed at Granada Studios. It shows the band being surrounded by dancing female models, one of whom was Whelan's girlfriend.

Pills 'n' Thrills and Bellyaches was released on 5 November 1990. The cover, done by Central Station Design, consists of American sweet wrappers, with the band's name and the album's title laid on top in cartoon lettering. Matthew Robertson wrote in his book Factory Records: The Complete Graphic Album (2006) that it blends ephemera from Los Angeles, where the album was recorded, and London, where it was mixed. Factory Records paid for Central Station Design to visit Los Angeles for a week while the band was in the midst of recording there in order to gather the materials that would end up on the final artwork. These pieces were used in the lettering, while pieces from London were used for the background. When the album was issued in the US, later in the month, the artwork was changed because of fears of being sued for copyright infringement. A launch party was held at the London Zoo on the same day as its UK release. The following week, on 12 November 1990, the band released the video album Call the Cops, which consisted of footage shot on their tour of the US. The band promoted Pills 'n' Thrills and Bellyaches with an arena tour in the United Kingdom in November and December 1990, with support from Donovan, whom the band had met earlier in the year. Happy Mondays started in 1991 with appearances at the Great British Music Weekend festival in the UK and Rock in Rio 2 in Brazil. Both performances were lambasted by audience members; the latter was nearly abandoned due to rain, though the band continued playing despite being told they might get electrocuted.

A new music video was filmed for "Step On" on 12 January 1991 in London, directed by Jean-Baptiste Mondino. It was intended to coincide with a re-release of the song in the US. Originally planned for 18 February 1991, "Loose Fit" was released as the album's third single on 25 February 1991. Wilson decided on it, though the band wanted "God's Cop" as their next release. "Bob's Yer Uncle" and a remix of "Kinky Afro" appeared as the B-sides to "Loose Fit". Remixes of "Loose Fit" and "Bob's Yer Uncle", done by the Grid, were released on a 12" vinyl, being retitled "Loose Fix" and "Bob's Yer Tune", respectively. The single, along with its music video, was delayed due to needing to remove lyrics about the Gulf War. Robertson said the song has a "very dark and sinister subtext" to it, and as such, Central Station Design "set about capturing this idea by composing a murkier experience" for its front artwork. The back cover features burned fat to "simulate burnt, bubbling human flesh [which] was used to suggest the violence of warfare". Following this, they went on a tour of mainland Europe, which lasted until March 1991. It took into account the territories that London Recordings released the album in, in an effort to build a fan base in those counties.

Upon arriving back in the UK, the band performed "Loose Fit" on Top of the Pops. Later in March 1991, the band returned to the US, where they toured for two months. A few of the shows were criticized by the press for their short length, often only playing for 50 minutes. The New York City date of the tour, on 24 April 1991, saw the band support Jane's Addiction. Around this date, "Bob's Yer Uncle" was released as the next single from the album instead of the planned "Step On" reissue. McGough had wanted Elektra to release "God's Cop" or "Loose Fit" to capitalise on the band's US shows. Senior management at Elektra caught wind of the band's short sets and them cancelling or not showing up to promotional meet and greet events and decided to stop pushing the band in the US. Around the same time, contemporaries the Charlatans had returned to the UK from their own US tour, marking the end of the Madchester scene trying to break the US. Exhausted from the trek, Happy Mondays cancelled the last few shows in order to rest in Texas. A series of headlining shows and festival performances took place between May and August 1991.

=== Reissues and related releases ===
Happy Mondays released their first live album in 1991, titled Live, which was recorded during a Leeds show earlier that year. It was previously released as an official bootleg under the name Baby Big Head, which drew comparisons to the Who's Live at Leeds (1970). Wilson was fine with the band self-releasing the bootleg; the band's motivation for doing so in the first place stemmed from Factory owing the band around £100,000 in royalties. Rhino Records reissued Pills 'n' Thrills and Bellyaches as a two-disc set in 2007, with bonus tracks and a DVD of the band's music videos. In 2012, daily newspaper The Guardian gave readers a free copy of the album in each newspaper. It was included in Rhino Records' Original Album Series box set in 2013, which collected Happy Mondays' first four studio albums. The album was re-pressed on vinyl in 2020.

"Kinky Afro" and remixes of "Loose Fit", "Bob's Yer Uncle", and "Step On" appeared on Happy Mondays' first compilation album, Double Easy – The U.S. Singles (1993). "Loose Fit", "Bob's Yer Uncle", "Step On", and a remix of "Kinky Afro" were included on their second compilation album Loads (1995). "Kinky Afro", "Loose Fit", "Bob's Yer Uncle", "Step On", and a remix of the latter appeared on the band's third compilation album, Greatest Hits (1999). "Bob's Yer Uncle" and "Step On" appeared on their fourth compilation album, The Platinum Collection (2005). "Kinky Afro", "God's Cop", "Loose Fit", "Dennis and Lois", "Bob's Yer Uncle", and "Step On" were included on the band's fifth compilation album, Double Double Good: The Best of Happy Mondays (2012).

== Critical reception ==
Professional ratings
Review scores
Source	Rating
AllMusic	5/5 stars
Entertainment Weekly	C+
Los Angeles Times	3.5/5 stars
Mojo	4/5 stars
NME	9/10
Pitchfork	9.5/10
Q	4/5 stars
The Rolling Stone Album Guide	3.5/5 stars
Select	5/5
Sounds	4/5 stars

Several writers praised the writing of Pills 'n' Thrills and Bellyaches. Stuart Maconie of NME hailed it as "a tremendous record, and a gauntlet chucked at the feet of all the other would-be legends in town." Los Angeles Times writer Jonathan Gold said any person with a "degree can tell you about pop’s post-modern condition, the simultaneous existence of all forms of music at once, but you rarely hear it expressed like this on a single record". The staff at CMJ New Music Report praised the band for being "more forward-thinking, diverse and downright interesting [on this album] than most would have imagined from previous dour efforts." Select's Andrew Harrison referred to it as "ludicrously, expansively, stupidly excellent", going on to praise Oakenfold's DJ pedigree, which the CMJ New Music Report staff also did.

Other reviewers were less receptive to the album. Simon Reynolds, writing in The New York Times, called it a "perplexing mishmash" that can alienate listeners outside of Manchester's rave scene "because it's designed to confuse and repel outsiders." In a less enthusiastic review, Bob Mack of Entertainment Weekly said that apart from "Step On" and "Donovan", the album shows that the band is less interesting than their Madchester contemporaries and does not warrant comparisons to the Rolling Stones. Jornal do Brasil's Arthur Dapieve called it disappointing, stating that the titles of the songs match the monotony of their sound. In a review for The Village Voice, critic Robert Christgau cited "Grandbag's Funeral" and "Kinky Afro" as highlights but stated that "their Voidoids is hotter than their 'dance music'".

Retrospective reviews were highly positive. In a review for AllMusic, Stephen Thomas Erlewine called Pills 'n' Thrills and Bellyaches a hedonistic album that was the peak of Happy Mondays' "career (and quite arguably the whole baggy/Madchester movement) ... a celebratory collage of sex, drugs, and dead-end jobs where there's no despair because only a sucker could think that this party would ever come to an end". The staff at Q magazine called it their "artistic peak" and a "top-hole album", while the staff at PopMatters saw the album as the band's "masterpiece", dubbing it the "Ulysses of modern rock music — the rock album that didn’t just question what rock music is, but ignored what rock music is". BBC Music reviewer Daryl Easlea wrote that the album "all gets a bit much toward the end, but no matter, what a hoot it is on the way there". Edward Sharp-Paul of FasterLouder said the band's tracks "still lived or died depending on whether the tone-deaf waster out front could think of something halfway coherent to mumble about." Writing for Pitchfork, Ian Cohen lauded the album as a "masterpiece that reinvented post-punk for the rave era", which "remains eternally alluring for any musical movement trying to balance drugs, thugs, and hugs, all raving under one roof."

== Commercial performance ==
Pills 'n' Thrills and Bellyaches had 150,000 pre-orders. It peaked at number four on the UK Albums Chart, selling 400,000 copies after spending 28 consecutive weeks on the chart. It was certified platinum by the British Phonographic Industry (BPI) in March 1991. It also charted at number 27 in New Zealand, number 30 in Austria, number 41 in Sweden, number 89 in the US, and number 98 in Australia. The Quietus have referred to it as the band's "dance-rock breakthrough".

"Step On" charted at number five in the UK and number 46 in the Netherlands. In the US, it reached number 57 on the Billboard Hot 100, as well as number nine on Alternative Airplay, number 13 on Dance Club Songs, number 46 on Dance Singles Sales, It was certified gold by the BPI in May 2021. "Kinky Afro" charted at number five in the UK and number 34 in New Zealand. It peaked at number one in the US on Alternative Airplay. It was certified silver by the BPI in September 2022. "Loose Fit" charted at number 17 in the UK and number 71 in the Netherlands. "Bob's Yer Uncle" peaked at number 23 in the US on Alternative Airplay and number 25 on Dance Club Songs.

== Accolades and legacy ==
Oakenfold and Osborne were nominated for, but ultimately lost, the British Producer of the Year award at the 1991 Brits for their work on Pills 'n' Thrills and Bellyaches. The album was included in the book 1001 Albums You Must Hear Before You Die (2006).

Dave Simpson of Uncut said the band's decision to work with Oakenfold and Osborne "inspired everything from U2's Achtung Baby and The Prodigy's 'Firestarter' to Blur's hooking up with William Orbit and Suede aligning themselves" with Osborne. Ian Cohen suggested in Pitchfork that Pills 'n' Thrills and Bellyaches was "perhaps the first example of a rock band reinventing themselves as a sampledelic hip-hop act." In a retrospective piece for DJ Mag, journalist Ben Cardew said tracks such as "Kinky Afro", "Loose Fit", and "God's Cop" erased the "genre distinctions between rock, funk, soul, and dance music, making it sound perfectly natural for a band raised in rainy Manchester to create sunshine funk music." Author Richard Luck said in his book The Madchester Scene (2002) that while the album was "[n]either as coherent nor as polished" as the Stone Roses' eponymous debut studio album, it stood as one of the most important albums from the time period "if only because of Ryder's songwriting and the heady mix of high times and low lives that infuses every track". In 2015, the band performed the album in its entirety on a UK tour to celebrate its 25th anniversary. They repeated this feat in Australia in 2019. Dzidziuś I Diabeł covered "Loose Fit" for their album Impreza (1993), while Hawke included a remix of "Bob's Yer Uncle" on his album +++ (2009).

== Track listing ==
All lyrics by Shaun Ryder, all music by Happy Mondays, except where noted.

No.	Title	Writer(s)	Length
1.	"Kinky Afro"		3:59
2.	"God's Cop"		4:58
3.	"Donovan"		4:04
4.	"Grandbag's Funeral"		3:20
5.	"Loose Fit"		5:07
6.	"Dennis and Lois"		4:24
7.	"Bob's Yer Uncle"		5:10
8.	"Step On" (John Kongos cover)	Kongos; Christos Demetriou	5:17
9.	"Holiday"		3:28
10.	"Harmony"		4:01
Total length:			43:49

== Personnel ==
Personnel per booklet.

Happy Mondays

- Shaun Ryder – vocals
- Paul Ryder – bass guitar
- Gary Whelan – drums
- Paul Davis – keyboards, programming
- Mark Day – guitar
- Bez – dancer

Additional musicians

- Rowetta – guest vocals
- Tony Castro – percussion
- Simon Machan – original programming

Production and design

- Ray Blair – recording engineer
- Cameron – studio assistant
- Dave Burnham – assistant mix engineer
- Paul Oakenfold – producer, arranger, mixing
- Steve Osborne – producer, arranger, mixing
- Central Station Design – art

== Charts and certifications ==
Chart performance for Pills 'n' Thrills and Bellyaches
Chart (1990–1991)	Peak position
Australian Albums (ARIA Charts)	98
Austrian Albums (Ö3 Austria)	30
New Zealand Albums (RMNZ)	27
Swedish Albums (Sverigetopplistan)	41
UK Albums (Official Charts)	4
US Billboard 200	89

Certifications for Pills 'n' Thrills and Bellyaches
Region	Certification	Certified units/sales
United Kingdom (BPI)	Platinum	300,000^{^}
^{^} Shipments figures based on certification alone.

== See also ==
- Some Friendly – the 1990 debut by contemporaries the Charlatans, issued a month before Pills 'n' Thrills and Bellyaches
