= Tokoloshe =

Zulu water spirit

In Nguni mythology, the tokoloshe, tikoloshe, tikolosh, tonkolosh, tonkolosi, tokolotshe, thokolosi, or hili is a dwarf-like water spirit. It is a mischievous and evil spirit that can become invisible by drinking water or swallowing a stone. Tokoloshes are called upon by malevolent people to cause trouble for others. At its least harmful, a tokoloshe can be used to scare children, but its power extends to causing illness or even the death of the victim. Protection against them includes traditional methods such as raising beds off the ground and interventions by spiritual figures like pastors with an apostolic calling or traditional healers (sangomas), who are seen to possess the power to banish them. The tokoloshe is often referenced satirically to critique the influence of superstitions on behaviour and society.

== Mythology ==
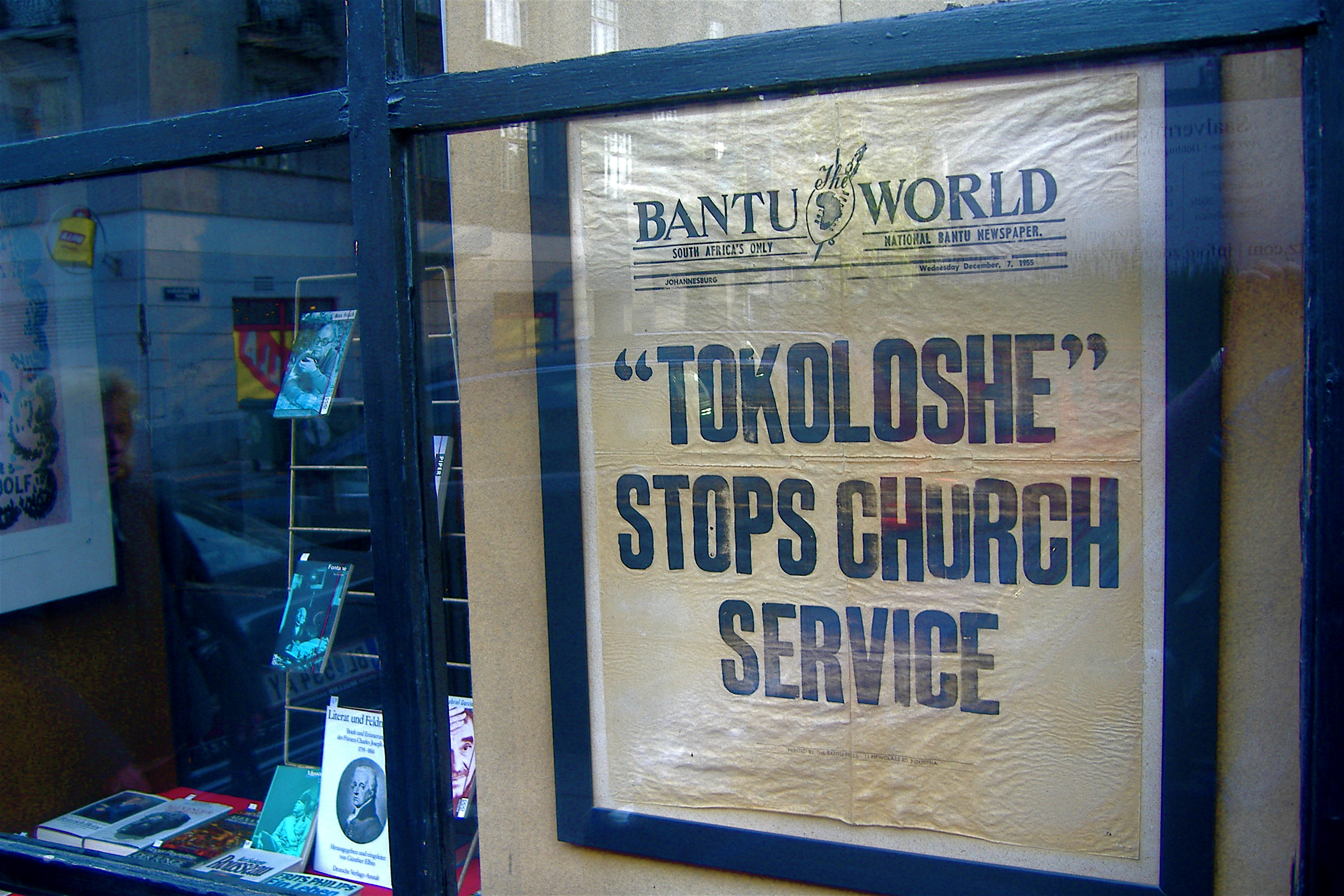
Newspaper headline, 7 December 1955

The advent of the phantom tokoloshe came about through Bantu folklore to explain why people inexplicably died while sleeping in their rondavels at night. Traditionally, these people slept on the floor on grass mats encircling a wood fire that kept them warm during sub-freezing cold winter nights on the highveld in the rarefied air. They never realized the fire was depleting the oxygen levels, leaving noxious carbon monoxide, which is heavier than pure air and sinks to the bottom. Eventually it was realized that anyone who happened to be sleeping in an elevated position escaped the deadly curse of the tokoloshe, which was described as a short man about hip high who randomly stole one's life in the night unless they were lifted to the height of their bed.

"Some Zulu people (and other southern African tribes) are still superstitious when it comes to things like the supposedly fictional tokoloshe—a hairy creature created by a witch doctor to harm his enemies (also … known to bite off sleeping people's toes)."

According to legend, the only way to keep the tokoloshe away at night is to put a few bricks beneath each leg of one's bed.

== Creation ==
The client (typically a jealous individual) approaches a malevolent witch doctor to seek vengeance against someone. The client must promise the soul of a loved one but cannot choose which one, as the tokoloshe will select the soul it intends to take. The witch doctor locates a dead body to possess, piercing the eye sockets and brain with a hot iron rod to prevent the body from thinking for itself, and sprinkling it with a special powder that shrinks the body. The tokoloshe is then unleashed to terrorise its target, claiming the promised soul of the client's loved one for weeks, months, or possibly even years.

== In popular culture ==
- Running gags about tokoloshes are common in the South African daily comic strip Madam & Eve.
- "Tokoloshe Man" was a pop hit by John Kongos, later covered by Happy Mondays and released on the Elektra compilation album Rubáiyát.
- The video for Die Antwoord's song "Evil Boy" featuring Wanga features a tokoloshe.
- TOKOLOSH is an English rock band based in Manchester, named after the John Kongos song and a South African monster.
- The word "tokoloshe" is mentioned several times in the 2003 film The Bone Snatcher by Titus when the team encounters an ant-like demonic creature.
- "Hosh Tokoloshe" is a tokoloshe-inspired pop/rap song by South African rapper Jack Parow.
- Belief in the tokoloshe is a major part of Gavin Hood's 1999 film A Reasonable Man.
- Serial killer Elifasi Msomi claimed to have been influenced by a tokoloshe.
- A tokoloshe appears in every episode of the third series of the British TV show Mad Dogs, although only one character can see it, and it is left unclear as to whether it is real or a hallucination. At one point, the characters are told that if you see a tokoloshe, it means somebody will die.
- Tokoloshe is the full name of Tok, the mascot for the English surfing and clothing company Saltrock.
- DJ and musician Steve "Toshk" Shelley got his stagename as a derivation of tokoloshe.
- In Gene Wolfe's The Shadow of the Torturer, Severian is considered to be a tokoloshe by the Zulu shaman, Isangoma, he encounters in an aerial hut in the Botanic Gardens.

== See also ==
- Anchimayen
- Tupilaq
