= New Zealand Public Party =

Unregistered political party in New Zealand

- Founder: Billy Te Kahika
- Founded: 11 June 2020
- Dissolved: 19 February 2021
- Ideology: Right-wing populism, Isolationism
- International affiliation: None
- MPs in the House of Representatives: 0 / 120

Website
- nzpublicparty.org.nz

The New Zealand Public Party was a short-lived political party in New Zealand led by Billy Te Kahika. It was founded in June 2020, and two months later became a component party of registered party Advance New Zealand in order to contest the 2020 election. Advance received only 1.0% of the party vote and neither Advance nor Public won any electorate seats, so the Public Party did not win any representation in Parliament. The Public Party split from Advance shortly after the election acrimoniously, and Public's party secretary and director both resigned in January 2021.

The party was "conspiracy theory driven", opposing the United Nations, 5G technology, 1080 poison, fluoridation, and electromagnets. It spreads misinformation related to the COVID-19 pandemic and aims to repeal the COVID-19 Public Health Response Act 2020, the primary legal mechanism for fighting the COVID-19 pandemic in New Zealand.

In mid–February 2021, after briefly renaming it the New Zealand Freedom Party, Te Kahika announced that he was shutting down the party to focus on activism.

== History ==
=== Foundation ===
Billy Te Kahika, son of guitarist and musician Billy TK, founded the party in June 2020. At the party's launch, Te Kahika said that the COVID-19 pandemic would enable globalist leaders to implement UN agendas that would totally control people's lives, and that billionaires had developed weaponised viruses and patented treatments for the viruses they had made, in order to enslave humanity. Despite an initial lack of coverage in mainstream media, the party collected a following on social media.

=== Alliance with Advance New Zealand ===
After it missed the deadline for registration to contest the party vote in the 2020 general election, the Public Party attempted to form an electoral alliance with Vision NZ. Vision refused to provide Te Kahika the leadership position of a merged party and the plan fell apart. Talks with the New Zealand Outdoors Party were also unsuccessful. The party did not apply for a broadcasting allocation for the 2020 election.

On 26 July 2020 the party announced an electoral alliance with Advance New Zealand. Billy Te Kahika became co-leader of Advance and had the number one ranking on Advance's party's list. Advance New Zealand was registered on 6 August 2020, and so was eligible to contest the party vote.

The Public Party announced that it would run candidates for electorates under the Public Party name. Billy Te Kahika contested Te Tai Tokerau, and Jenny Brown was announced as a candidate for the East Coast electorate. Self-proclaimed psychic Jeanette Wilson announced her candidacy, but withdrew it the next day. As the Public Party was a component party of Advance New Zealand, then if the Public Party were to have won an electorate seat, this would have ensured Advance's entry to parliament.

In early August 2020, the New Zealand Outdoors Party's co-leader Sue Grey alleged that her party had been the target of a harassment campaign by supporters of the NZ Public Party after they had a rejected a takeover offer in April and refused to join an alliance with Advance New Zealand. Public Party leader Billy Te Kahika said that he found the behaviour "absolutely reprehensible" and asked his supporters not to abuse Grey, but also alleged that supporters of the Outdoors Party had been abusive towards his party.

On 16 August the Public Party was recognised as a component party of Advance New Zealand by the Electoral Commission.

=== 2020 election campaign ===
On 27 August the Public Party drew controversy after it posted a video on its Facebook page claiming that the New Zealand Government had passed a law allowing it to force citizens to get a COVID-19 vaccine. According to Agence France-Presse's Fact Check, key parts of MPs' speeches had been cut out and edited to distort what they were saying. The Advance Party's co-leader Jami-Lee Ross defended the video, claiming that the Labour-led coalition government had passed a law to forcibly vaccinate citizens. After refusing to remove the video, Ross was referred to the Parliamentary Privileges Committee by Speaker of the House Trevor Mallard, which concluded that the video was "deliberately misleading".

The anti-domestic violence charity White Ribbons ended Te Kahika's ambassadorship in August 2020, on the grounds that his recent remarks about COVID-19 and other issues undermined the trust's evidence-based approach. Te Kahika also alleged that he was the target of an international assassin.

On 8 September 2020 lawyers acting for the party threatened a former member with legal action for defamation over claims party director Michael Stace was a "CIA agent". On 9 September 2020 the Electoral Commission announced that it was investigating the Public Party's collection and use of party donations, following a complaint passed on by the Serious Fraud Office. On 10 September, the Electoral Commission suspended its investigation into the Public Party's collection and use of donations since it is not subject to the rules of the Electoral Act as an unregistered party. The party reportedly received $255,000 in undeclared donations.

A poll of Te Tai Tokerau, released on 8 October, reported Te Kahika had less than 1% of people in the electorate intended to vote for him.

At the election, the Advance Party received only 1.0% of the party vote, below the 5% threshold required to enter Parliament. Advance also failed to win any electorate seats. Te Kahika himself won only 1,349 electorate votes, coming fourth, and Jennie Brown received 832 votes and came fifth. As such, no members of the Public Party were elected.

=== Post-election ===
After the election, Billy Te Kahika claimed the election had been rigged, and said he feared votes for Advance were not counted because voters added comments or smiley faces to their ballots. He also said he was "very worried" that 200,000 votes had been not been properly counted. He refused to accept the election result and said he planned a tally of Advance voters to prove the official process was corrupt. The Electoral Commission said that adding comments to a ballot would not invalidate it, and did not understand his reasoning for claim about the 200,000 lost votes. In a later post, he said that his figure of 200,000 was a mistake, but insisted that Advance NZ supporters' had written comments and drawn smiley faces on their voting forms, causing them to be disqualified.

On 26 October, Te Kahika severed ties with Advance NZ after its election failure, stating that he had decided not to continue with the party. Later that day, Te Kahika issued a statement clarifying that he was not severing relations with Advance NZ but was instead restoring its "autonomy." Te Kahika also vowed not to step down as party leader and reiterated his support for Advance NZ. By December 2020, the Public Party was no longer recorded as a component party of Advance, according to the Electoral Commission, and Te Kahika was no longer mentioned as a co-leader of Advance on that party's website.

According to a Stuff report by Matt Shand, Ross had brushed aside concerns by senior party officials about irregularities with Te Kahika's donations (or koha) on the grounds that he had little prospect of being re-elected without Te Kahika's party. Ross also reportedly threaten to resign if Te Kahika was removed over financial irregularities.

In November 2020, the Public Party received a letter from Advance New Zealand saying that policies on the Public Party website were copyrighted by Advance NZ and that the Public Party must stop using them, and that the Public Party must not use certain colours associated with Advance. Public Party director Michael Stace also said they had been locked out of a joint bank account and has asked police to investigate to recover funds (worth NZ$60,000), but Advance NZ's lawyer Graeme Edgeler stated that the bank account in question was always in Advance's name only and that it did not owe the Public Party any money. Stace alleged that Advance NZ had a mole within the Public Party who was leaking information about the Public Party's movements and activities to the other party's leadership. Edgeler proposed a settlement in which Advance NZ would pay the costs of an advertisement in the Christchurch-based The Press newspaper and an invoice from the East City Community Trust for election night party costs. However, he also warned that Advance NZ would file legal action against Te Kahika and the Public Party if the latter did not drop their allegations that Ross and Advance NZ had committed theft and misconduct.

On 2 January 2021, the party secretary Michelle Hood, and the director Michael Stace, resigned from the party, with Stace posting details of financial irregularities on the party website. Stace labelled the party "a cult", while Hood stated Te Kahika was "more interested in a rock and roll lifestyle than politics".

On 19 February, Te Kahika announced the dissolution of the NZ Public Party, which he had briefly renamed the Freedom Party. However, he vowed to continue his activist work via social media.
