= Hard Meat =

British progressive rock group

- Origin: Birmingham, England
- Genres: Psychedelic rock, progressive rock
- Years active: 1969–1971
- Past members: Michael Dolan, Steve Dolan, Mick Carless

Hard Meat was a British rock band active between 1969 and 1971. The band was formed by the Birmingham-born brothers Michael Dolan (1947–2014) (guitar, lead vocals) and Steve Dolan (1948–2000) (bass, vocals), with drummer Mick (variously Mike) Carless.

The trio's debut single was a cover of the Beatles' "Rain" b/w "Burning Up Years" on the Island label in 1969. This was followed by two albums released by Warner Bros in 1970: Hard Meat and Through a Window. Their second single (culled from the latter album) was "The Ballad of Marmalade Emma and Teddy Grimes," based on the life of two well-known Colchester tramps. Despite tours of Europe and the U.S., neither album saw chart success, and the group disbanded shortly afterwards.

New Zealand band The Human Instinct covered "Burning Up Years" on their 1969 debut album of the same name.
