= Human instinct =

Human instinct may refer to:

- Instinct in humans
  - Human nature, a related concept
- The Human Instinct, a New Zealand rock band
