= Ride the Lightning (disambiguation) =

Ride the Lightning is a 1984 album, with an eponymous song, by Metallica.

Ride the Lightning may also refer to:

- Ride the Lightning (Marshmallow Coast album), 2001
- "Ride the Lightning" (John Kongos song), 1975
- "Ride the Lightning (717 Tapes)", a song by Warren Zeiders, 2021

== See also ==
- "Riding the Lightning", a 2006 episode of Criminal Minds
