= Billy Te Kahika =

New Zealand musician and politician (born 1972)

Billy Te Kahika Jr

Leader of the New Zealand Public Party
- In office June 2020 – 19 February 2021

Co-leader of Advance NZ
- In office 6 August 2020 – 26 October 2020 Co-leading with Jami-Lee Ross

Personal details
- Born: 18 July 1972 (age 54)
- Parent: Billy TK

William Desmond Te Kahika Jr (born 18 July 1972), also known as Billy TK Jr, is a New Zealand conspiracy theorist, blues musician and former political candidate. During the 2020 New Zealand general election, Te Kahika attracted media coverage both as the leader of the fringe New Zealand Public Party and for his promulgation of conspiracy theories. Te Kahika and the Public Party opposed the New Zealand Government's lockdown restrictions in response to the COVID-19 pandemic.

Te Kahika, who lives in Whangārei, is the son of musician Billy TK.

== Early life and musical career ==
Billy Te Kahika Jr is the son of Māori musician Wiremu Te Kahika, also known as Billy TK, who played with the New Zealand rock band The Human Instinct. Te Kahika Jr's mother is Pākehā. He grew up in Māngere, Auckland. Te Kahika followed in his father's footsteps and became a guitarist; like his father he was also called the "Māori Hendrix" by some. Since 1993, he has toured internationally, performing with artists such as George Thorogood, Jimmy Barnes, The Neville Brothers, Ian Moss, Junior Wells, and Joe Satriani. He has performed at festivals, including the Sydney Blues & Roots Festival and the Fiji International Jazz and Blues Festival. He also led a band called "The Groove Shakers."

Te Kahika joined the New Zealand Army as he wanted to be an SAS soldier but served as a private in the Royal New Zealand Army Logistic Regiment between September 2001 and January 2003. During that time he attended military intelligence courses. According to the Stuff Circuit documentary "False Profit," Te Kahika left the army after he was involved in a drunken brawl sparked by when he allegedly verbally insulted a colleague with a speech impediment.

Following his stint in the army, he trained as a police recruit in Porirua between May and July 2003. Te Kahika claimed that he left the New Zealand Police after they overlooked his admission that he had been caught smoking glue at the age of 16 years. Te Kahika alleged that the police did not want him to report that two police officers who had covered up his glue smoking incident. Based on this experience, Te Kahika claimed that the New Zealand Government was corrupt. According to the Stuff Circuit documentary "False Profit", he was eliminated from the police training programme since he had supplied false identification that did not match his fingerprints. The documentary also questioned Te Kahika's claim that he had served full-time in the police in 2003.

According to "False Profit," Te Kahika was also involved in a financial dispute with the organisers of the 2013 Queenstown Jazz Festival. The festival proved to be unprofitable with Te Kahika left with significant debts. Te Kahika alleged that the organisers had attempted to take advantage of his brand. According to the musicians Petra Rjinbeek and Maggie Cocco, Te Kahika bullied fellow musicians and neglected to pay them for their gigs and expenses. Both Coco and Rjinbeek also alleged that Te Kahika, who identifies as a Christian, was sexually promiscuous and harassed women.

In July 2016, Te Kahika announced plans to host a festival in the Northland Region, establishing a company called the World Indigenous Festival New Zealand with himself as its CEO. The venture received the support of Helen Clark, the former New Zealand Prime Minister and the head of the United Nations Development Programme. Several taxpayer-funded bodies invested in the festival, including Te Puni Kōkiri and Sport New Zealand each invested $20,000. The festival, scheduled to take place in 2019, did not go ahead. Sport NZ and Auckland Council's economic growth agency ATEED later stated that they did not give Te Kahika permission to use their corporate logos in material pitching their support.

In the summer of 2018/19, Te Kahika and Irish vocalist Ronan Kavanagh toured Northland as part of the AA Solar Summer Music Series. In November 2018, Te Kahika and his father played at the Old Parakao Store Cafe/Bar in Pakotai. In October 2019, Te Kahika held a "Road to Chicago" tour across New Zealand as a warm-up to his tour of the United States in early 2020. Between January and mid-February 2020, he toured the United States, performing with blues guitarist and singer Buddy Guy in Chicago on 13 January.

== Political career ==
=== Founding of the New Zealand Public Party ===
During the COVID-19 pandemic in New Zealand, Te Kahika founded the New Zealand Public Party, which was launched on 11 June 2020. The Public Party campaigned against the Government's COVID-19 Public Health Response Act 2020 and opposed the United Nations, 5G technology, 1080 poison, fluoridation, vaccines, pharmaceuticals, and electromagnetics. Te Kahika spread misinformation about the COVID-19 pandemic, alleging that the pandemic would enable globalist leaders to implement UN agendas that would subjugate people, and that billionaires had developed weaponised viruses and patented treatments for these viruses to enslave humanity. According to media reports, Te Kahika had researched fringe ideas circulating on social media platforms like Facebook and YouTube. His social media posts and live broadcasts were initially circulated for his Facebook friends, but gained a wider following and reached 30,000 views by May 2020. The popular reception to these broadcasts inspired him to found the Public Party.

Since the Public Party had missed the deadline to register with the Electoral Commission for the 2020 New Zealand general election, Te Kahika attempted to merge his party with Hannah Tamaki's Vision NZ and the New Zealand Outdoors Party but was unsuccessful. On 26 July 2020, the Public Party announced an electoral alliance with independent Member of Parliament Jami-Lee Ross' Advance New Zealand party. Under this coalition arrangement, Te Kahika and Ross became co-leaders of the merged party. Te Kahika contested the Māori electorate of Te Tai Tokerau and had the top list ranking on Advance's list.

In early August 2020, Te Kahika urged his party's supporters not to abuse the Outdoors Party's leadership after the Outdoors Party had rejected an offer to merge with the Public Party in April. However, he also alleged that the Outdoors Party's supporters had been abusive towards the Public Party. Following a second outbreak of COVID-19 community transmission in Auckland, Te Kahika participated in an anti-lockdown protest in Aotea Square that had been organised by Facts NZ and the Kotahitanga Movement Aotearoa. On 16 August, his Public Party was recognised by the Electoral Commission as a component party of Advance New Zealand.

=== Election campaigning and opposition to lockdown ===
On 12 September 2020, Te Kahika and fellow Advance NZ co-leader Ross took part in a "National Rally for Freedom" rally in Auckland's Aotea Square opposing the Government's COVID-19 lockdown, which attracted a few thousand people.

In October 2020 it was revealed that Te Kahika's paid weekly interviews with New Zealand conspiracy theorist Vinny Eastwood had violated electoral law as they did not include a legally-required promoter statement. The Electoral Commission took no action as Te Kahika's sponsorship had been disclosed.

=== Election results and post-election events ===
The 2020 general election was held on 17 October. Te Kahika came fourth in the Te Tai Tokerau electorate, with 1,349 votes (4.9%); the seat was won by incumbent Labour Member of Parliament Kelvin Davis. The Advance NZ coalition gained one percent of the party vote (28,429 party votes), well below the five percent level needed to enter Parliament, so Te Kahika was not elected to Parliament.

Following the election, Te Kahika alleged that it had been rigged and that Advance NZ ballots had been disqualified because voters added comments or smiley faces to their ballots. He also claimed that 200,000 votes had not been properly counted. He refused to accept the election result and said he planned a tally of Advance voters to prove the official process was corrupt. The Electoral Commission disputed Te Kahika's allegations that adding comments to a ballot would invalidate them and rejected his allegation about the 200,000 lost votes. In a later post, he said that his figure of 200,000 was a mistake but stuck to his claim that Advance voters' ballots had been disqualified for writing comments and drawing smiley faces on them.

On 26 October, Te Kahika severed ties with Advance NZ after its election failure, stating that he had decided not to continue with the party. Later that day, he issued a statement clarifying that he was not severing relations with Advance NZ but was rather restoring its "autonomy." Te Kahika also vowed not to step down as party leader and reiterated his support for Advance NZ.

In mid-November 2020, Newsroom and Newshub reported that Te Kahika and his NZ Public Party were locked in a dispute with Advance NZ over the ownership of party policies and access to funds within an ASB Bank account. On 6 November, Ross sent a letter to Te Kahika and the NZ Public Party claiming that the policies that the parties had co-written were owned and copyrighted by Advance NZ. In addition, the NZ Public Party claimed that the ASB account was a shared account while Advance NZ's lawyer Graeme Edgeler contended that the account belonged to them. Ross also threatened Te Kahika with legal action in response to the latter's claims that Ross and his party committed theft and misconduct.

On 14 January 2021, Te Kahika led a "freedom rally" outside the New Zealand Parliament. The rally opposed the Government's COVID-19 lockdown, 1080 usage, water fluoridation, Communist China, and the United Nations, and expressed support for United States President Donald Trump. The rally was attended by between 100 and 150 people with Te Kahika being accompanied by private security.

On 19 February, Te Kahika announced the dissolution of the NZ Public Party, which he had briefly renamed the Freedom Party, but vowed to continue his activist work via social media.

In December 2021, Te Kahika criticised other groups and leaders opposing the Government's COVID-19 restrictions in a video livestream, alleging there was dissension within the movement. He claimed that Destiny Church leader Brian Tamaki would use his The Freedoms & Rights Coalition (TFRC) to recruit people into his church. Te Kahika also criticised the anti-vaccination group Voices for Freedom and farmer advocacy organisation Groundswell NZ for allowing only approved messaging on protest signs. He criticised Groundswell for suppressing anti-vaccination messages at their marches. Tamaki disputed Te Kahika's claims there were dissension within the anti-lockdown movement and denied that he was trying to recruit people into his church. A Groundswell spokesperson emphasised that the organisation was focusing on advocating for farmers and rural New Zealanders and denied Te Kahika's claim that the group was aligned with the National Party.

==== 2021 anti-lockdown protest ====
On 18 August 2021, Te Kahika led an anti-lockdown protest outside the TVNZ headquarters in the Auckland CBD that was attended by anti-lockdown activists and COVID-19 deniers. Arrested 43 minutes into his rally, he asked police to take him away as soon as possible to reduce the chance of his assorted supporters causing trouble. The following day, Te Kahika pleaded not guilty to two charges of violating the COVID-19 Public Health Response Act 2020 and one charge under the Search and Surveillance Act in relation to an anti-lockdown protest in Auckland held on 18 August. In September 2021, he was granted a variation in his bail conditions to allow him to continue his online sermons.

In April 2022, Te Kahika and his co-accused Vinny Eastwood pleaded not guilty to breaching COVID-19 alert level 4 lockdown restrictions banning public gatherings. The defendants opted for a judge-only trial scheduled for 23 August 2022. On 23 August, Te Kahika and Eastwood's trial at the Auckland District Court began with Justice Peter Winter presiding. Police submitted social media videos of Te Kahika encouraging people to join the protest. Following a three day trial, Justice Winter convicted Te Kahika and Eastwood of violating COVID-19 lockdown restrictions on 16 December 2022. He also rejected their argument that their protest was protected by the New Zealand Bill of Rights Act 1990.

On 30 March 2023 Te Kahika was sentenced to four months imprisonment, and Eastwood was sentenced to three months. The two men were subsequently granted bail pending an appeal to the High Court. The two men appealed their convictions and sentences. On 22 December 2023, Judge Neil Campbell of the Auckland High Court upheld their convictions but overturned their sentences, ordering that Te Kahika and Eastwood be convicted and discharged.

==== 2020 election misconduct charges ====
In September 2021 Te Kahika was charged with filing false electoral donation returns and obtaining $15,000 by deception. Name suppression lapsed and he was identified in October 2021.

== Community involvement and public image ==
Between 2009 and 2010, Te Kahika was involved with Holden's "Driving Towards a Future" programme, which sought to educate young drivers about road safety issues like drink driving, speeding and personal responsibility. Between August and October 2011, Te Kahika led a music tour to help The Salvation Army raise funds for families affected by the 2011 Christchurch earthquake. In October 2019, Te Kahika organised a special benefit concert to raise support for Auckland's homeless community called the "Blues For the Homeless," which played in Milford.

Until late August 2020, Te Kahika served as an ambassador for the anti-domestic violence charity White Ribbons. Following his controversial remarks about COVID-19 and other issues, White Ribbons severed relations with Te Kahika on the grounds that his remarks undermined the trust's evidence-based approach. This suspension accompanied an Advance NZ/NZ Public Party video falsely alleging that the New Zealand Government had passed legislation forcing people to take a COVID-19 vaccine. Te Kahika defended his remarks and stance, claiming that the Government was corrupt and that COVID-19 was "nothing worse than a flu." Te Kahika also alleged that he was the target of an international assassin.

As leader of the NZ Public Party, Te Kahika advocated on behalf of a woman known as "L.K.," who was imprisoned in late August after she and her children breached managed isolation in Hamilton to attend her husband's funeral. Te Kahika described her as a "brave and courageous woman" who had "touched" his heart through her experience. He also claimed that he had lobbied the Government into releasing her after seven days.

An investigation by Stuff Circuit, reported in October 2020, found that Te Kahika had misrepresented the New Zealand Government as backing a feasibility study to install solar power in 20 hotels in Samoa. In addition, Te Kahika unsuccessfully attempted to solicit NZ$30,000 from a businessman to establish an investment bank in Samoa. In January 2021 news website "thisquality" reported that Billy Te Kahika used a $200,000 loan given to him for a housing project for the homeless to instead purchase a Land Rover Discovery and fund his political movement, and that Te Kahika had admitted being under investigation over the matter.

== Personal life ==
At age 21, Te Kahika was baptised as a member of the Seventh-day Adventist Church. He later joined the Seventh Day Adventist Reform Movement, and was re-baptised by the denomination on 13 December 2014, aged 42.

== Views and positions ==
According to University of Otago religion scholar Deane Galbraith, Te Kahika's conspiracy theories about COVID-19 and the New World Order are rooted in evangelical Christian End Times theology. Te Kahika's opposition to the alleged "New World Order" has led him to support US President Donald Trump.

In June 2020, Te Kahika made remarks in a Facebook Live video criticising the formation of Israel and propagating conspiracy theories related to the Rothschild family and Jewish control over the global financial system. In addition, he also claimed that Zionism was the "rape and infiltration" of Jewish identity and religion and described Judaism as a "Satanic deception." The New Zealand Jewish Council spokesperson Juliet Moses, Jewish spiritual leader Yaakov Brown, sociologist Paul Spoonley, and historian Sheree Trotter have criticised Te Kahika for promoting anti-Semitism.
