= Helden (disambiguation) =

Helden may refer to:

- Helden, a former municipality and a town in the Netherlands, now part of Peel en Maas
- Arms and the Man (1958 film) or Helden, a 1958 German film
- Helden (band), a 1980s electronic New Wave band
- Wir sind Helden, a German band sometimes referred to as Helden
- Helden, a village belonging to the town of Attendorn, Germany
- "Helden", the German version of David Bowie's song "Heroes"
