= Gordonia (film) =

- Directed by: Tom Reilly
- Produced by: Tom Reilly
- Release date: 19 July 2010 (New Zealand International Film Festival)
- Country: New Zealand

Gordonia is a 2010 documentary film directed and produced by New Zealand filmmaker Tom Reilly.

Filmed over the course of seven years Gordonia follows the struggle between west Auckland landowner Graham Gordon and the former Waitakere City Council over Gordon's car wrecking business and illegal dwellings. As well as Gordon's story, the film traces the lives of several tenants living on his property, some of whom have mental health problems and claim to have nowhere else to live.

== Persons featured ==
- Graham Gordon
- Randal Wilson
- Shane Campbell
- Jeanae Gordon
- Brodie Andrews
- James Harvey
- Mervin Hellyer
- Martin Lush
- Billy TK Senior
- Bob Harvey (mayor)

== Release ==
Gordonia premiered at the 2010 New Zealand International Film Festival and was released in cinemas in Auckland and Wellington that same year.
