= Kinky Afro =

1990 single by Happy Mondays

Single by Happy Mondays

from the album Pills 'n' Thrills and Bellyaches
- B-side: "Kinky Afro" (live)
- Released: 8 October 1990
- Length: 3:55
- Label: Factory
- Songwriters: Shaun Ryder; Paul Ryder; Mark Day; Paul Davis; Gary Whelan
- Producers: Paul Oakenfold; Steve Osborne

Happy Mondays singles chronology
"Step On" (1990)	"Kinky Afro" (1990)	"Loose Fit" (1991)

Music video
- "Kinky Afro" on YouTube

"Kinky Afro" is a song by the English alternative rock band Happy Mondays, produced by Paul Oakenfold and Steve Osborne. It was released as the second single from the band's third studio album, Pills 'n' Thrills and Bellyaches, on 8 October 1990. The song's chorus paraphrases the Labelle song "Lady Marmalade". The song was originally going to be called "Groovy Afro", but was changed to "Kinky Afro" after the English band the Farm released a similarly named song titled "Groovy Train" earlier in 1990.

== Release ==
The song was the band's biggest hit in the United States, reaching number one on the US Billboard Modern Rock Tracks chart. It reached number five in the United Kingdom, tied with "Step On" as the band's highest-charting single there. "Kinky Afro" was also the band's highest-charting single in Australasia, peaking at number 63 on Australia's ARIA Singles Chart and number 34 on New Zealand's Recorded Music NZ (then RIANZ) chart.

== Music video ==
The music video was produced and directed by Keith Jobling of the Bailey Brothers.

== Track listings ==
7-inch

1. "Kinky Afro" – 3:55
2. "Kinky Afro" (live) – 4:36

12-inch

1. "Kinky Afro" (12" mix) – 5:07
2. "Kinky Afro" (live) – 6:38

CD

1. "Kinky Afro" (Radio Edit) – 3:58
2. "Kinky Afro" (12" Mix) – 5:08
3. "Kinky Afro" (live) – 6:38

Australian 12-inch

1. "Kinky Afro" (Euromix) – 7:26
2. "Kinky Afro" (Euromix edit) – 4:15
3. "Step On" (US Dub mix) – 5:55

"Kinky Groovy Afro" 12-inch

1. "Kinky Groovy Afro" (Peter Lorimer mix) – 7:32
2. "Kinky Groovy Afro" (live) – 6:38

== Charts ==
=== Weekly charts ===
Chart (1990–1991)	Peak position
Australia (ARIA)	63
Europe (Eurochart Hot 100)	22
New Zealand (Recorded Music NZ)	34
UK Singles (OCC)	5
UK Indie (Music Week)	1
US Alternative Airplay (Billboard)	1

=== Year-end charts ===
Chart (1991)	Position
US Modern Rock Tracks (Billboard)	12

== Certifications ==
Region	Certification	Certified units/sales
United Kingdom (BPI)	Silver	200,000^{‡}
^{‡} Sales+streaming figures based on certification alone.

== Release history ==
Region	Date	Format(s)	Label(s)	Ref.
United Kingdom	8 October 1990	—N/a	Factory	
Australia	26 November 1990	7-inch vinyl; CD; cassette	Festival; Factory	
Australia	3 December 1990	12-inch vinyl ("Kinky Groovy Afro")	Festival; Factory	
Japan	21 December 1990	CD	London; Factory	
Australia	4 March 1991	12-inch vinyl (Euromix)	Festival; Factory	

== See also ==
- List of Billboard number-one alternative singles of the 1990s
