= Saltrock =

British surfwear company

Saltrock Surfwear
- Type: Public
- Industry: Retail
- Founded: Penzance, Cornwall, United Kingdom (1988)
- Headquarters: Braunton, Devon, United Kingdom
- Key people: Angus Thomson, Founder, Product Designer, Managing Director & Chairman of the Board, Ross Thomson Founder, Managing Director
- Products: Apparel, sporting goods, Accessories
- Website: Saltrock website

Saltrock Surfwear is a British surfwear company based in Devon. Created by brothers Ross and Angus Thomson in 1988, the idea was fostered in order to generate money to fund their passion of surfing. The brothers moved the company from Penzance, Cornwall, to Devon in 1992, after which surfer Carl Priscott joined the board.

== History ==
Angus and Ross Thomson are two South African natives who decided to travel the world in the eighties and experience the best places to surf. They ended up in Cornwall after taking a train from London to check out the waves in Penzance. After spending most of their days on the beach and their nights in a pub they began to run low on cash and had to figure out a way to make money. In 1988, they decided to create T-shirts since they both needed a creative outlet.

They named the brand Saltrock after the South African town Salt Rock situated 40 minutes outside of Durban. This was their favourite place to surf back in their home-country South Africa and they wanted to carry that with them.

With their own designs inspired by surfing, they self-printed T-shirts. They created their own blackout system made from tape, nails, and a Salvation Army rug. They sold these T-shirts out of the back of their Austin Allegro until the shirts became so popular that they were actually interfering with their surfing. The surfers who lived in Cornwall loved the shirts and the brothers could not keep up with the demand of products. This demand led the brothers to pack up from Penzance and move up the coast to Croyde. They moved to this new coastal town, and on their first night there they met a group of surfers at The Thatch Pub who are still a part of Saltrock. In Croyde, North Devon the brand took off, branching outside of the surf community and growing in popularity. After gaining many new fans, Angus and Ross teamed up with Carl Priscott, four years after their humble beginning in 1988. With Priscott on board the enthusiasm within Saltrock exploded and the brand expanded to nearby Braunton. This expansion led to Saltrock becoming established in the heart of the UK surfing community. From there the brand expanded nationally, gaining popularity throughout the nation before spreading internationally.

On 17 August 2018, Saltrock went into administration with multiple stores subsequently closing. The company then became managed by SRS REALISATIONS 2017 LIMITED. Soon after entering administration yachting company 'Crew Clothing Co Group' agreed to buy Saltrock out of administration. 25 stores across the South West and their online store remain open.

== Shop locations ==
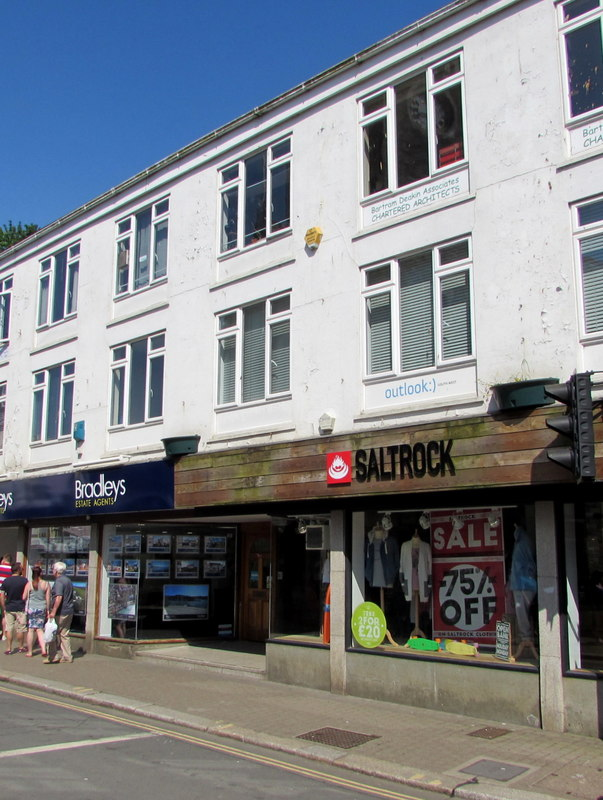
Saltrock in Cornwall.

The Saltrock brand is found in 300 stores in the UK, Ireland and Europe. There are also over 50 Saltrock retail stores and a website with an online store. Most of the stores are located in the south and south west of England.

The Saltrock retail stores are located in:

Cornwall

- Bude
- Falmouth, Cornwall
- Fowey
- Looe
- Newquay
- Padstow
- Penzance
- St Austell (Cornwall Services)
- St Ives, Cornwall
- Truro (closed)

Cumbria

- Kendal
- Keswick

Devon

- Barnstaple
- Bideford (Atlantic Village)
- Braunton
- Brixham
- Croyde
- Dartmouth
- Exeter
- Exmouth
- Plymouth (closed)
- Salcombe
- Sidmouth
- Teignmouth
- Torquay
- Totnes
- Woolacombe

Dorset

- Bournemouth
- Dorchester (closed)
- Lyme Regis
- Swanage
- Poole
- Weymouth

Essex

- Saffron Walden
- Southend-on-Sea

Gloucestershire

- Cheltenham
- Gloucester

Hampshire

- Fareham (closed)
- Lymington
- Southampton (closed)
- Southsea

Kent

- Chatham
- Whitstable

Lancashire

- Fleetwood

Lincolnshire

- Skegness

Norfolk

- Norwich

Northern Ireland

- Newcastle, County Down

Shropshire

- Shrewsbury

Somerset

- Street, Somerset
- Taunton (closed)
- Minehead
- Weston-super-Mare (closed)

Staffordshire

- Stoke-on-Trent
- Cannock*

Sussex

- Worthing
- Eastbourne

Wales

- Aberystwyth
- Bridgend
- Cardigan
- Conwy
- Llandudno
- Mumbles
- Saundersfoot
- Swansea
- Tenby

Wiltshire

- Swindon (Swindon Designer Outlet) (closed)

Worcestershire

- Evesham

== Mascot ==
The mascot of Saltrock is a crazy haired surfer boy called Tok. Tok is named after the Tokoloshe. The Tokoloshe is a South African Legend about a dwarf-like water sprite who is evil and mischievous. The idea of Tok was brought by Angus and Ross from Salt Rock, South Africa. Tok embodies the Saltrock brand and is featured on many of their products. The Saltrock brand portrays a love of fun and waywardness which is personified in Tok. Tok is a prankster who causes trouble and mischief to no end. Tok appears in all guises from a cheeky sprite to evil spirit.

Tok is mostly known for being the red logo of Saltrock but he is also featured in many of their other products. He is most often used as the graphic printed on the clothing products of Boys and Men. Tok is also the star of 'See No Surf, Hear No Surf, Pray For Surf’ and ‘Stamp', some of Saltrock's most popular prints.
