= Tokoloshe Man =

Single by John Kongos

from the album Kongos
- B-side: "Can Someone Please Direct Me Back to Earth"
- Released: 5 November 1971
- Genre: Glam rock
- Length: 3:50
- Label: Fly
- Songwriter: John Kongos
- Producer: Gus Dudgeon

John Kongos singles chronology
"He's Gonna Step on You Again" (1971)	"Tokoloshe Man" (1971)	"Ride the Lightning" (1975)

"Tokoloshe Man" is a 1971 UK hit single by John Kongos, released on Fly Records and featured on his second studio album Kongos. It stayed in the UK Singles Chart top 10 for five weeks, peaking at number 4. Kongos' previous single release was "He's Gonna Step on You Again", another number 4 UK chart hit.

"Tokoloshe Man" was covered by the Happy Mondays. It featured on the 1990 Elektra compilation album, Rubáiyát: Elektra's 40th Anniversary.

== Meaning ==
The word Tokoloshe refers to the mystical beast of the same name in African mythology, which is thought to terrorise and eat people at night.
