= Christos Demetriou =

British songwriter and producer

Chris Demetriou
- Also known as: Chris Dee
- Born: Christos Demetriou
- Genres: R&B; pop
- Instruments: Keyboards; piano; guitar
- Years active: 1966–present

Christos "Chris" Demetriou (born in Paphos, Cyprus), also known as Chris Dee, is a British songwriter, musician, and record producer. A cover of a song he co-wrote with John Kongos, "He's Gonna Step On You Again" (which later became "Step On" by the alternative dance band Happy Mondays), appears in Q magazine's top hundred singles of all time.

== Career ==
Demetriou began his professional music career as a teenager, playing keyboards for the Johannesburg R&B group, John E Sharpe & the Squires. He appeared on the group's most successful singles, including covers of The Kinks' "Stop Your Sobbing" and Paul Simon's "I Am A Rock", as well as their Maybelline album.

Demetriou left South Africa for London with fellow musician John Kongos and the pair formed the psychedelic rock group, Floribunda Rose. However, the band soon changed its name to Scrugg and recorded a number of singles on the Pye label, with producer John Schroder and new drummer, Henry Spinetti. Scrugg enjoyed limited success, with their double A-side "One Way Street" and "Linda Loves Linda" receiving significant airplay but failing to perform well in the charts. The songwriting partnership of Kongos/Demetriou proved to be more successful than the groups they were in – with two songs reaching the top five in the UK Singles Chart and another, sung by Bond girl Daliah Lavi, reaching number one in Germany and Switzerland. Some of their early work, including recordings by Floribunda Rose and Scrugg, were released on the compilation Lavender Popcorn in 2001. They also wrote the music for the British cult film A Promise of Bed directed by Derek Ford and starring John Bird, Victor Spinetti and Dennis Waterman.

Demetriou's most notable songwriting credit is for "He's Gonna Step on You Again", along with Kongos. The original version was released by Kongos and made it into the UK Singles Chart for 14 weeks – reaching No. 4 in May 1971. The song was notably covered by the Happy Mondays (retitled as "Step On") and this version was listed at number 77 in "The Top 100 Greatest Singles of All Time", published in the February 1999 edition of Q magazine. Demetriou again collaborated with Kongos on his follow-up single, "Great White Lady" but it did not enter the top twenty of the UK chart.

In 1970, Demetriou started to work with Tony Defries at Gem Productions and then with MainMan on David Bowie's material.

Demetriou changed direction in 1972 and became a full-time record producer. One of his first recordings was a single with the group Milkwood. After quitting the New Seekers, Laurie Heath, Chris Barrington and Sally Graham formed Milkwood and they released three singles for Warner Bros., two of which Demetriou produced. Barry Krost signed the young record producer to BKN Management and Demetriou started working with Mike d'Abo, formerly of Manfred Mann, producing Down at Rachael's Place and Little MissUnderstood. As a result of being signed to the same management company, Demetriou collaborated with Cat Stevens in the recording of the album Buddha and the Chocolate Box. During these early years, Demetriou produced ten albums and over a dozen singles, including five albums for A&M Records (see Discography).

By the mid-1970s, Demetriou had become an A&R manager / record producer for Decca Records, during which time he signed and recorded Robert Campbell, whose album Living in the Shadow was put forward by Decca for a Grammy Award nomination. Between the years 1984 and 1988, ACTS International (his South African record label, distributed by MFP), released three top five singles and one top twenty album — all of which were produced by Demetriou. In 2015, Demetriou ventured back into the music business and started a new record label, Red Letter Music.

== Discography ==
Production credits

- "The Lady Wants More" / Hayden Wood (7-inch single) NEMS 1969
- "House Beside the Mine" / Hayden Wood (7-inch single) NEMS 1969
- Down At Rachel's Place / Mike d'Abo (12-inch LP) A&M Records 1972
- "About Your Love" / Milkwood (7-inch single) Warner Bros 1972
- "I'm a Song (Sing Me)" / Milkwood (7-inch single) Warner Bros June 1972
- Lookin' Through / Demick & Armstrong (12-inch LP) A&M Records 1972
- Travis / Travis (12-inch LP) A&M Records 1972
- Shine On Me / Paul Travis (12-inch LP) A&M Records 1973
- Buddha and the Chocolate Box / Cat Stevens (12-inch LP) Island Records 1974
- Return Of The Native / Paul Travis (12-inch LP) A&M Records 1975
- "Higher Than Heaven" / Buggati & Musker (Demo) Decca 1976
- Living In The Shadow / Robert Campbell (12-inch LP) Decca Records 1977
- Crawler / Crawler / (12-inch LP) CBS 1977
- Straight From The Hip / Liar (12-inch LP) Decca Records 1977
- "Looking Kinda Rock & Roll" / Darling (7-inch single) Charisma 1978
- "Ain't No Water" / Linday Hayes (7-inch single) Charisma 1978
- "I'll Be Your Rock & Roll Slave" / Lynda Hayes (7-inch single) 1978
- "Fast at Seventeen" / Lee Fardon (7-inch single) Arista 1978
- Come Holy Spirit / Vinesong (12-inch LP) WEA 1984
- "Champions of Love" / Tom Inglis (7-inch single) ACTS 1985
- "Destined to Win" / Tom Inglis (7-inch single) ACTS 1985
- "What Have We Done To The World" (7-inch single) ACTS 1985
- Jubillee Africa / Friends First (12-inch LP) 1986
- "Wild World" / Pierre de Charmoy (7-inch single) EMI 1987

Artist credits

- Maybelline, John E Sharpe & the Squires (12-inch LP) RPM 1965
- "Stop Your Sobbing", John E Sharpe & the Squires (7-inch single)
- "I Am A Rock", John E Sharpe & the Squires (7-inch single) RPM Records 1965
- "I'll Explain" / "Yours For The Picking" / "Monkey Shine", Savage Sounds of Africa, Beat Records 1965
- "One Way Street"/ "Linda Loves Linda" – Floribunda Rose (7-inch single) Pye Records 1967
- "Lavender Popcorn", Scrugg (7-inch single) Pye Records 1968
- "Everyone Can See", Scrugg (7-inch single) Pye Records 1968
- "I Wish I Was Five", Scrugg (7-inch single) Pye Records 1969

Songwriting credits

- "The House Beside The Mine" / Hayden Wood (7-inch single) NEMS 1969
- "Deserts Of Mountains Of Men" (LP) Confusions About A Goldfish / John Kongos / Dawn Records 1969
- "Seat By The Window" (LP) Confusions About A Goldfish / John Kongos / Dawn Records 1969
- "Coming Back To You" (LP) Confusions About A Goldfish / John Kongos / Dawn Records 1969
- "He's Gonna Step On You Again" with John Kongos (12-inch single) Fly Records 1971;
- "Gold" / Olivia Newton-John (LP track) EMI 1972;
- "Inside Your Shadow" / Espanola (Comp) Essex 1972;
- "Let The Love Grow (In Your Heart)", Daliah Lavi (Single) Polydor 1973;
- "Blaze of Glory" / "He's Gonna Step on You Again" / Exploding White Mice (7", Single B-side only) Greasy Pop Records 1987
- "He's Gonna Step on You Again", Chantoozies (Single and Album) Mushroom Records 1989
- "Pills 'N Thrills And Bellyaches" (LP) Step On, London Records 1990
- "Lavender Popcorn", with Floribunda Rose & Scrugg (Comp CD) 2001
- "Kongos" / John Kongos (Comp CD) Collectors' Choice Music 2001
- "(He's Gonna) Step on You" (Have A Little Faith – CD/Album) John Swan, Liberation Music 2007
