= Zaine Griff =

- Also known as: Glenn Mikkelson
- Born: 4 October 1957 (age 69)
- Origin: Auckland, New Zealand
- Genres: Synthpop, new wave, ambient, electronic
- Instruments: Vocals, guitar, bass
- Website: https://www.zainegriff.com/

Zaine Griff (born 4 October 1957 in Auckland, New Zealand) is a singer-songwriter who was part of the English new wave and new romantics scene of the early 1980s. Raised in New Zealand, he moved to England in the 1970s, where he continued with his artistic and musical career, becoming a solo artist. He worked with The Human Instinct, The Kinks, Tony Visconti, Hans Zimmer, Kate Bush, Warren Cann and Yukihiro Takahashi, among others.

== Biography ==
Born in New Zealand, he joined rock band The Human Instinct aged 16 as their bassist, taking the stage name of Glenn Mikkelson. Griff moved to England in the 1970s. He played bass guitar with Kevin Ayers and The Kinks on their album, Misfits.

In 1979 Griff started his solo career. He released two albums, Ashes and Diamonds (recorded in 1979, released in 1980), produced by Tony Visconti, and Figvres (1982), on which he collaborated with future successful film composer Hans Zimmer, and many colleagues from the new wave and new romantic era including Kate Bush, Warren Cann of Ultravox and Yukihiro Takahashi, of Japanese electronic band YMO.

The single "Tonight" peaked at No. 54 in the UK Singles Chart in February 1980, whilst "Ashes and Diamonds" reached No. 68 in the same listing in June that year.

Griff's first two albums Ashes and Diamonds and Figvres were re-released both on CD and on iTunes in June 2012. In November 2012 they were released in a special Japanese release with bonus songs.

In 2011 Griff returned to live music. After a series of live concerts in his homeland New Zealand, he returned to the London stage in October 2012, when he was a guest in Toyah's live show "Resurrection" in O2 Islington. In September 2014, Griff did two live concerts in Tokyo, Japan.

In August 2017, Zaine Griff's early albums Ashes and Diamonds and Figvres were reissued as a two-CD set through MIG Records' Collectors Premium Series. The release contains remastered versions of both albums, along with 21 additional recordings, including demos, previously unreleased songs, and outtakes.

== Discography ==
With The Human Instinct:

- The Hustler (Zodiac, 1974)
- Peg Leg (recorded 1975, released 2002)

With Screemer:

- Interplanetary Twist (Bell, 1976)
- In The City (Arista, August 1977)

As solo artist:

- Tonight – single (Automatic, February 1980)
- Ashes and Diamonds – single (Automatic, May 1980)
- Run – single (Automatic, August 1980)
- Ashes and Diamonds – album (Automatic, October 1980, rerelease ZG Music Ltd, June 2012)
- Figvres – single (Polydor, July 1982)
- Flowers – single (Polydor, September 1982)
- Figvres – album (Polydor, October 1982, rerelease ZG Music Ltd, June 2012)
- Swing – single (Polydor, October 1983)
- Child Who Wants the Moon – album (ZG Music Ltd, August 2011)
- The Visitor – album (ZG Music Ltd, April 2013)
- Abjure – EP, 4 songs (ZG Music Ltd, April 2013)
- Immersed – album (ZG Music Ltd/Ode Records, May 2014)
- Mood Swings – album (ZG Music Ltd/Ode Records, January 2016)
- The Helden Project // Spies - album (Sony Music Labels SICX 30156, December 2022)

With The Helden Project, Hans Zimmer, Warren Cann and others (1983, lead vocals):

- Holding On – single (1983)
- Spies – album, vocals on 6 songs (unreleased)

With Yukihiro Takahashi:

- This Strange Obsession on What? Me Worry? album

With Gary Numan:

- The Secret on the album, Berserker (1984)
