= Advance New Zealand =

Political party in New Zealand (2020–2021)

- Leader: Jami-Lee Ross
- Founder: Jami-Lee Ross
- Founded: 2020
- Dissolved: 19 August 2021 (deregistered)
- Split from: New Zealand National Party
- Headquarters: 309 Botany Road, Botany, Auckland
- Ideology: Conspiracy theorism Right-wing populism COVID-19 conspiracism
- Political position: Big tent Far-right (alleged)
- Colours: Blue and Red
- MPs in the House of Representatives: 0 / 120

Website
- advancenz.org.nz offline as of September 2021

The Advance New Zealand Party (abbreviated as Advance NZ or Advance) was a political party in New Zealand from 2020 to 2021. The idea was first unveiled in a newsletter from founder Jami-Lee Ross in April 2020. Ross described the party as a centrist and anti-corruption movement, designed to appeal to voters "in the middle".

Ross had been a member of the New Zealand National Party until a public scandal with leader Simon Bridges, in which he accused Bridges of corruption. Ross was accused of sexual harassment and bullying, and has been investigated for corruption.

In July 2020, Advance entered into an agreement with Billy Te Kahika's New Zealand Public Party, a conspiracy theory party that spread misinformation during the COVID-19 pandemic on its Facebook page. It also reached agreements with several other small parties.

Advance did not win any seats in the 2020 New Zealand general election, receiving 1.0% of the party vote and not winning any electorate seats. Te Kahika and the Public Party split from Advance shortly afterwards. On 19 August 2021, Advance was deregistered from the list of registered political parties.

== Background ==
Jami-Lee Ross had been a long-time stalwart for New Zealand's centre-right National Party, having been elected to the Manukau City Council in 2004 aged just 18, and later as a Member of Parliament for Botany at 25 in 2011. Botany is one of the safest seats for the National Party, and Ross continued to win Botany by comfortable margins. Ross became the party's Senior Whip in May 2017. After the National Party lost power at the 2017 election, Ross became a high-ranking figure in the Opposition led by new National leader Simon Bridges. He served on the business and transport and infrastructure select committees.

In a highly publicised falling out in 2018, Ross accused Bridges of corruption involving a $100,000 donation to the party, filing a false return, and falsifying the name of a donor to hide the identity. Bridges denied all of the claims. Ross left the National Party in October 2018, just before the National Party voted to expel him. The party went through with the vote to expel him anyway. Ross then released the audio from conversations between him and Bridges which he said backed up his claim. In a press conference on 16 October, Ross announced his intention to resign his seat and contest the resulting by-election as an Independent candidate. Later, Ross chose to remain in Parliament and the election never took place. Ross was subsequently accused of sexual harassment and bullying behaviour towards staff members, National Party officials, and members of Parliament.

On 29 January 2020 the Serious Fraud Office (SFO) announced they had charged four people in relation to the claims made by Ross in 2018 around the NZ$100,000 donation. It was said that none of the sitting National Party MPs at the time, including Simon Bridges, were among the four charged. On 19 February 2020, it was reported that Ross was one among four people charged by the SFO over a $105,000 donation made to the National Party in June 2018. The SFO alleged that Ross and the other defendants, three Chinese businessmen, had committed fraud by splitting the 2018 donation into sums of money less than $15,000, which were then transferred into the bank accounts of eight different people before being donated to the National Party. On 25 February, Ross and the other defendants appeared in court where they pleaded not guilty to the charges relating to the National Party donations.

== Creation ==
With Ross's case still ongoing in the Auckland District Court, he announced his intention to create his own political party in an April 2020 newsletter. The party was described by Ross as a "new political movement" designed to appeal to "brave voices in the middle that speak truth to power". Initially, little was known about the party beyond its broadly centrist ethos and central issue of anti-corruption – in particular, opposition to the Chinese government's alleged influence on New Zealand. At the party's creation, Ross stated he would contest his seat of Botany as the Advance NZ candidate, going up against National candidate and former Air New Zealand CEO Christopher Luxon. However, just days before the close of nominations he announced he would not contest Botany and would instead run as a list-only candidate.

In July 2020, the Advance New Zealand Party applied for registration with the Electoral Commission. It achieved registration on 6 August 2020. By mid-September, Ross claimed the party had 7,000 members.

== Alliances with other parties ==
Advance New Zealand has had four component parties: the New Zealand Public Party, the New Zealand People's Party, Reset NZ, and Direct Democracy New Zealand. As of December 2020, only Direct Democracy remained as an officially registered component party.

Jami-Lee Ross said that his plan for the party was based on the structure and make-up of the Alliance Party, and he proposed an arrangement where smaller parties would maintain their own identity and board, but stand candidates under a shared party list as Advance. Ross also said that he had invited the New Zealand Outdoors Party, New Conservative Party, The Opportunities Party, Social Credit, Heartland New Zealand Party and ONE Party to join Advance in the alliance. Winston Peters stated that Advance approached his party, New Zealand First, which he rejected, saying that Advance was "dangerous, particularly to Maori and Polynesian people".

=== New Zealand Public Party ===
On 26 July 2020, Ross announced that he was merging Advance New Zealand with the New Zealand Public Party. Public Party leader Billy Te Kahika became co-leader of Advance. Te Kahika was ranked first on Advance's party's list for the 2020 election, and he contested the electorate of Te Tai Tokerau, though under the NZ Public Party banner. All other party candidates ran under the Advance NZ banner. Stuff reported after the election that Ross had said in text messages to party members in August saying, “Without Billy we have no viable chance of election to Parliament” and that "If there’s no viable chance [of working with the Public Party], then I’m going to go back to Plan A and bowing out of politics there is no point continuing." Stuff also reported that Ross was asked to participate in a post-election coup to replace Te Kahika as leader of the Public Party, but said he had no interest in doing so.

The New Zealand Public Party, which subscribes to many conspiracy theories, is known for spreading misinformation related to the COVID-19 pandemic, as well as opposition to 5G technology, 1080 poison and fluoridation. On 16 August 2020 the Electoral Commission announced that it recognised the Public Party as a component party of Advance New Zealand.

On 26 October, just over a week after the 2020 election, Advance NZ split with the Public Party. While as of 6 November 2020 it was still an officially recognised component party of Advance, by December 2020 it was removed as a component party.

=== New Zealand People's Party ===
Ross appeared in a Facebook video of 29 July 2020 and stated that the New Zealand People's Party would be joining with Advance. The Electoral Commission confirmed that the People's Party was a component party of Advance on 18 August. The People's Party is a formerly-registered political party which contested the 2017 general election and two by-elections in 2016 with a particular focus on the rights of immigrants. The leader of the People's Party, Anil Sharma, was ranked seventh on Advance's party list.

By December 2020, the People's Party was removed from the list of Advance component parties.

=== Reset NZ ===
On 18 August, the Electoral Commission also announced that Reset NZ was recorded as a component party of Advance New Zealand. According to Reset NZ's website, the party's main policy is to dissolve Parliament, replace it with an interim governing body of three leaders and a "brain trust" of 21 people selected by the leaders, and develop a new government structure, which would include a constitution and the banning of "career politicians". Founder Michael Stace was fourth on Advance's party list.

By December 2020, Reset NZ was removed from the list of Advance component parties.

=== Direct Democracy New Zealand ===
On 18 August, the Electoral Commission also announced that Direct Democracy New Zealand was recorded as a component party of Advance New Zealand. According to its website, the party advocates for binding referendums, and opposes large-scale immigration, and "race-based" policies. As of December 2020, Direct Democracy is the only component party of the four to still be associated with Advance.

== 2020 election ==
=== Claims and challenges ===
In late August, Advance posted a video claiming that the Government had passed legislation forcing New Zealanders to be vaccinated against COVID-19. According to news outlet Agence France-Presse, the advertisement included footage from parliament video that had been edited mid-sentence to change the meaning of an MP's speech. Any use of parliamentary footage in political advertising is against parliamentary rules, and the Speaker of the House ordered the removal of the footage from social media. Advance refused to comply. Co-leader and MP Jami-Lee Ross was referred to the Parliamentary Privileges Committee by the Speaker of the House, which unanimously agreed Ross had broken parliamentary rules. However, with Parliament about to be dissolved, it decided that the next steps would be for the next Privileges Committee to determine.

In late September, Advance was excluded from the Newshub Nation multi-party leaders' debate scheduled for 3 October 2020, and co-leaders Ross and Te Kahika filed an urgent interlocutory injunction application at the Auckland High Court against MediaWorks. However, the court ruled against them.

On 8 October, Advance NZ was ordered by the Advertising Standards Authority (ASA) to remove its election advertisement that claimed COVID-19 deaths were comparable to the seasonal flu, saying it was "unfounded and socially irresponsible." Newspapers owned by NZME said they would comply with the order and not run the ad again, but Ross said that the party would not comply with the ruling and that the ASA should not try to interfere in election debate and free speech. On 16 October, the Advertising Standards Authority upheld most of the complaints against the Advance NZ and New Zealand Public parties but withdrew one.

On 15 October, Advance NZ's Facebook page was taken down during the middle of live feed by Te Kahika. Facebook justified its actions on the grounds that the party had repeatedly violated their policies by spreading misinformation about COVID-19 on their platforms. Co-Leader Te Kahika denounced Facebook's actions as "election interference." The party stated that the day before the take-down they had been warned they would be unpublished for violating Facebook's community standards.

In early 2021, Claire Deeks, who was ranked third on the party's list during the 2020 election, set up Voices for Freedom. The group had four complaints upheld against it by the Advertising Standards Authority for flyers they distributed that contained COVID-19 misinformation.

=== 12 September rally and non-compliance with COVID-19 restrictions ===
The party's leaders organised a rally on 12 September 2020, in which a crowd of a few thousand protested against lockdowns and restrictions due to COVID-19, as well as the 5G cellphone network, vaccines, the government in general, and the Trans-Pacific Partnership trade agreement. The crowd ignored social distancing requirements and most did not have masks. Police recognised people’s lawful right to protest, but also said they recognised the need for people to follow the level 2 restrictions that were in place at the time "to do their part to help prevent the spread of COVID-19" and said they "will continue to take an educative approach with attendees and organisers when necessary."

Also in September, Te Kahika was spoken to by police for incorrectly wearing a mask on a flight from Wellington to Dunedin; he wore a mask for the flight but refused to cover his nose with it.

=== Withdrawal from Botany ===
On 15 September, Ross announced that he would no longer contest the seat of Botany at the election. Ross had held the seat since 2011, first as a National MP, then from 2018 as an independent MP. Instead, Ross said he would campaign as a list-only candidate for the Advance Party. Ross said, "I could not do justice to our 60 candidates, our 7000 members and the thousands of volunteers while also properly running in the three-way contest here on the ground." In a post-election interview he reiterated that he wanted to focus on the nationwide campaign, and claimed that, had he run in Botany, he would have taken so many votes away from the National candidate that the Labour candidate would have won instead.

=== Funding ===
The Advance Party received a broadcasting allocation of $62,186 for the 2020 election. On 24 August 2020 Advance New Zealand declared $65,633.23 from the Public Party, which media called the second-largest donation declared by any party by that date that year, though after the election the Public Party said that "it was not a donation, but was NZPP transferring the money to the ASB account, what we understood to be a joint account, but the Electoral Commission rules do not cover the transferring of money between parties. Thus it had to be called a donation.”

On 14 October, TVNZ alleged that the party was soliciting donations from the US anti-vaccination movement and directing them to the Public Party in order to bypass New Zealand's ban on foreign donations.

=== Polling ===
Advance began to register in polls in September. It received 0.8% of support in Colmar Brunton's mid-September poll, and 0.6% in its late-September poll.

=== Results ===
Advance won 28,434 party votes in the 2020 election, or 1.0% of the total. No Advance candidate, nor any candidate from a component party, won an electorate. Without an electorate seat or at least 5% of the party vote, Advance did not meet the threshold to enter Parliament, and Ross lost his seat as an MP.

== Election aftermath ==
Journalist Tova O'Brien interviewed co-leader Jami-Lee Ross the day after the election, challenging his decision to "peddle misinformation". She questioned his decision to join with Billy Te Kahika; Ross said that there was "a lot of growth" in support for his cause, to which O'Brien responded, "you sold your soul for political ambition”. When asked about Te Kahika calling COVID-19 a "plandemic", Ross said he had never used that term; he did not comment on Te Kahika's statements but said that COVID-19 is a real virus. O'Brien refused to let Ross make a claim that COVID-19 has a similar mortality rate to influenza. When asked what he will do next, Ross said "I think it's time for a rest". The interview made international headlines and journalist Glenn Greenwald called it "an absolute masterclass in interviewing a politician".

After the election, co-leader Billy Te Kahika claimed the election had been rigged and that Advance had been 'diddled', and said he feared votes for Advance were not counted because voters added comments or smiley faces to their ballots. He also said he was "very worried" that 200,000 votes had been not been properly counted. He refused to accept the election result and said he planned a tally of Advance voters to prove the official process was corrupt. The Electoral Commission said that adding comments to a ballot would not invalidate it and votes will be counted provided the voter's intent is clear, and said that it did not understand his reasoning for his claim about the 200,000 lost votes. In a later post, Te Kahika said that his figure of 200,000 was a mistake, but insisted that Advance NZ supporters' had written comments and drawn smiley faces on their voting forms, causing them to be disqualified.

On 26 October, Te Kahika severed ties with Advance NZ after its election failure, stating that he had decided not to continue with the party. Ross also announced that the party would be undergoing restructuring with plans being released at a special annual general meeting scheduled for early 2021. Ross stated that the reconstituted party would contest the next general election scheduled for 2023. Te Kahika subsequently issued a statement claiming that he was not severing relations with Advance NZ but was rather restoring its "autonomy." Te Kahika also vowed not to step down as party leader and reiterated his support for Advance NZ.

In mid-November 2020, Newsroom and Newshub reported that Advance NZ were locked in dispute with Te Kahika and the Public Party over ownership of the parties' policies and NZ$60,000 worth of funds stored within an ASB Bank account. In 6 November, Ross has asserted Advance NZ's copyright ownership over party policies, which Te Kahika claimed had been co-written by the two parties. Advance NZ claimed that the funds within the ASB account belonged to them while the Public Party claimed that the account was a shared account and that the money belonged to them. While Advance NZ's lawyer Graeme Edgeler offered to help the Public Party cover the costs of an advertisement in The Press newspaper and an election party celebration, he threatened Te Kahika and the Public Party with legal action if they did not stop alleging that Ross and Advance NZ had committed theft and misconduct.

In mid-March 2021, Advance NZ and the Covid-denial group "Voices for Freedom" assisted in marketing, fundraising, and distribution of a publication called The Real News. It consists entirely of COVID-19 misinformation, including conspiracy theories around vaccines and Bill Gates, generally repeating discredited internet-based sources. The party promoted the magazine on its website and organised in fundraising to print, post and package 100,000 copies. The Real News is published by Full Courts Press director and shareholder Jonathan Eisen and his wife Katherine Smith, whose company has published the pseudoscientific The New Zealand Journal of Natural Medicine and the conspiracy theory–promoting Uncensored magazine. By 12 March, at least 60,000 copies of the magazine had been distributed into postboxes by volunteers. In May, a second issue of The Real News was circulated.

On 30 April 2021, a second version of Advance New Zealand’s Facebook page was removed by the social media giant for circumventing the earlier removal of the party’s first Facebook page in October 2020. Facebook had removed the earlier page for violating the platform’s misinformation and harm policies.

== Deregistration ==
On 16 July 2021, Advance NZ issued a media release that it was withdrawing its registration as a political party with the Electoral Commission. The party said that it appreciated the support it had received during the 2020 general election but had decided to deregister. Advance NZ also stated that it would keep its ideas alive through the magazine The Real News, which has promoted conspiracy theories about the COVID-19 pandemic and vaccines. The party was officially deregistered on 19 August 2021, though political parties are not required by New Zealand to register in order to operate.

As of 1 September 2021 the party's website is not operating.

== Election results ==
=== House of Representatives ===
Election	Candidates nominated		Seats won	Votes	Vote share %	Position	MPs in Parliament
Election	Electorate	List	Seats won	Votes	Vote share %	Position	MPs in Parliament
2020	55	62	0	28,434	1.0	9th	0 / 120
