= Pins in It =

Studio album by The Human Instinct
- Released: 1971
- Recorded: Mascot Studios, Auckland, May 1971
- Genre: Acid rock, psychedelic rock, blues-rock
- Length: 44:07
- Label: Pye Records
- Producer: John Kerr, Maurice Greer

The Human Instinct chronology
Stoned Guitar (1970)	Pins in It (1971)	Snatmin Cuthin (1972)

Professional ratings
Review scores
Source	Rating
AllMusic	link

Pins in It is the third album by New Zealand blues-rock band the Human Instinct, released in 1971. It was the first album to feature bassist Neil Edwards (formerly of the Underdogs) and the last to feature Billy TK on guitar. TK's departure signalled the end of the band's hard rock era.

In contrast to previous Human Instinct albums, Pins In It features mainly original compositions. The album includes one cover version, Pink Floyd's "The Nile Song". The lyrics of the opening track, "Pinzinet", were based on the Rubaiyat of Omar Khayyam. "Rainbow World" was released as a single.

The album was reissued on CD in 2001 by Ascension Records with four bonus tracks of alternative versions.

== Track listing ==
1. "Pinzinet" (Neil Edwards, Khayyam) – 4:02
2. "Stand Up" (Edwards, Maurice Greer, Tiny Thompson) – 3:44
3. "Duchess of Montrose" (Edwards) – 3:56
4. "Hazy Days" (Billy Te Kahika) – 3:36
5. "The Washing Song" (Edwards) – 2:50
6. "The Nile Song" (Roger Waters) – 3:17
7. "Play My Guitar" (Te Kahika) – 2:53
8. "Highway" (Te Kahika) – 2:22
9. "Rainbow World" (G. R. Edwards, Neil Edwards, Greer) – 4:27
- Bonus tracks on 2001 Ascension label CD:

10. "Playing My Guitar" (alternative version)
11. "The Nile Song" (alternative version)
12. "Duchess of Montrose" (alternative version)
13. "Rainbow World" (alternative version)

== Personnel ==
- Maurice Greer – lead vocals, drums, percussion
- Neil Edwards – bass
- Billy TK – guitars
- Dick Hopp – flute ("Rainbow World", "The Nile Song")
- Robert Hooper-Smith – organ ("Play My Guitar", "Highway")
