= Stoned Guitar =

Studio album by The Human Instinct
- Released: 1970
- Recorded: Stebbing Studios, Auckland
- Genre: Acid rock, psychedelic rock, blues-rock, hard rock
- Length: 44:55
- Label: Pye Records
- Producer: Maurice Greer

The Human Instinct chronology
Burning Up Years (1969)	Stoned Guitar (1970)	Pins in It (1971)

Professional ratings
Review scores
Source	Rating
Allmusic	3/5 stars

Stoned Guitar is the second album by New Zealand blues-rock band The Human Instinct. It was released in 1970. The cover features an adaptation of a painting by New Plymouth artist Michael Smither, "Two Rock Pools".

"Black Sally" was a cover of a March 1970 single by Sydney band Mecca, which featured singer/guitarist Dennis Wilson (no relation to Dennis Wilson of The Beach Boys) and bassist Bob Daisley, who formed Kahvas Jute in June 1970.

"Jugg-a-Jug Song" (Note: Also known as "Wake Me" and "It Ain't So Hard To Do") and "Midnight Sun" were covers of unreleased demos recorded by New Zealand guitarist Doug Jerebine under his stage name, Jesse Harper. (Jerebine's original versions were belatedly released in the 1990s.)

"Tomorrow" was a cover of "Tomorrow I'll Go" by John Kongos, whom Maurice Greer had befriended in London.

The original release stated that the album's closing track, a cover of Rory Gallagher's "Railway and Gun", was recorded live at Auckland's Bo-Peep Club, where the band had a residency. However, in the liner notes of the 2011 reissue Maurice Greer disclosed that the track was merely a studio recording with crowd noise overdubbed in order to simulate a "live" recording.

Two singles were released from the album: an edited version of "Black Sally" b/w "Tomorrow", and an alternative mix of "Midnight Sun" b/w "Idea" (a non-album track composed by Doug Jerebine and also known as "Keep Cool").

The album was reissued on CD in 2001 by Ascension Records, in 2007 by Rockadrome Records, and again in 2011 by Sunbeam Records.

== Track listing ==
1. "Black Sally" (Dennis Wilson) – 6:38
2. "Stoned Guitar" (Billy Te Kahika, Maurice Greer, Larry Waide) – 6:45
3. "Jugg-a-Jug Song" (Jesse Harper) – 8:03
4. "Midnight Sun" (Harper) – 9:41
5. "Tomorrow" (John Kongos) – 4:23
6. "Railway and Gun" (Rory Gallagher) – 9:22

== Personnel ==
- Billy TK — lead guitar (tracks 1–4, 6), effects (track 2), co-lead vocals (track 4)
- Larry Waide — bass (tracks 1–4, 6), backing vocals (tracks 1, 3, 6), lead guitar (track 4), co-lead vocals (track 4), acoustic guitar (track 5)
- Maurice Greer — drums (tracks 1–4, 6), lead vocals (tracks 1, 3–6), tambourine (track 1)
- Derek Neville — baritone sax (track 4)

== Covers ==
American band Vermonster covered "Black Sally" and "Stoned Guitar" on a 12" EP, Instinctively Inhuman (released 1991).

Australian band Seedy Jeezus cover Black Sally on a Live to Air broadcast on 106.7 PBS, Melbourne, Australia ( Dec 9, 2015). The guitarist later in an interview talks about his love for Human Instinct and how he drove Seedy Jeezus crazy on tour playing them all the time.
