= Elifasi Msomi =

South African serial killer

- Born: Elifasi Msomi; 1910; Union of South Africa
- Died: 10 February 1956 (aged 45/46); Pretoria Central Prison, Pretoria, Transvaal, Union of South Africa
- Cause of death: Execution by hanging
- Other names: The Axe Killer; Tokoloshe Killer
- Penalty: Death

Details
- Victims: 15
- Span of crimes: 1953–1955
- Country: Union of South Africa
- Date apprehended: 1955

Elifasi Msomi a.k.a. The Axe Killer (1910 – 10 February 1956) was a South African serial killer who was convicted in 1955 of 15 murders and sentenced to death by hanging. His victims all came from the Umkomaas and Umzimkulu valleys of Natal.

== Background ==
A Zulu man, Msomi was an unsuccessful young sangoma (shaman). Seeking professional assistance, he consulted with another sangoma. Msomi claims that during this exchange he was co-opted by an evil spirit, a tokoloshe. In August 1953, under the instruction of the tokoloshe, Msomi began an 18-month killing spree in the southern KwaZulu-Natal valleys of South Africa. Contemporary accounts and later court testimony described him as intelligent and articulate.

== Crimes ==
=== Victim selection ===
Msomi’s victims were predominantly poor, rural individuals living in the southern valleys of KwaZulu-Natal. Many were socially isolated and had limited access to formal policing. Several victims reportedly approached Msomi voluntarily, seeking healing, spiritual assistance, or guidance, due to his presentation as a sangoma.

=== Method ===
Msomi typically lured victims to remote or isolated locations, including rural paths and sparsely populated areas. Attacks were carried out without warning. Court records and contemporary reporting indicate that the murders were committed primarily using an axe or other blunt instruments. The consistency of the method contributed to the eventual linking of the crimes by investigators. Msomi's first known murder involved the initially raped and murdered a young woman in the presence of his mistress, keeping her blood in a bottle. Unimpressed with his 'new' powers, his mistress alerted the police who arrested Msomi. He escaped shortly afterwards, giving credit for his escape to the all-powerful tokoloshe.

Following his escape, he resumed killing. Over the ensuing period, Msomi murdered five children, before being re-arrested. He duly escaped again. Msomi was arrested a month later for petty theft. The stolen items turned out to belong to his victims and he was soon identified as the murderous culprit.

Msomi readily assisted the police in finding some of his victims' remains including a missing skull. Whether he gained further satisfaction from revisiting his crime scenes or felt diminished responsibility in light of the tokoloshe's influence is unclear. During his trial, Msomi claimed that he was merely a conduit for the evil tokoloshe.

Two psychologists disagreed, stating that Msomi was in fact of much higher than average intelligence and further that he derived sexual pleasure from inflicting pain. Msomi was sentenced to death by hanging at Pretoria Central Prison.

== Superstition ==
However, Msomi's reference to the tokoloshe and his numerous escapes had caused a high level of consternation amongst some of the Zulu community. Upon request, the judge permitted a deputation of nine Zulu chiefs and elders to attend the hanging in order to confirm that the tokoloshe did in fact not save Msomi from his death. Even so, one chief felt that Msomi might return after death as a tokoloshe himself.

== See also ==
- List of serial killers in South Africa
- List of serial killers by number of victims
