= He's Gonna Step on You Again =

1971 single by John Kongos

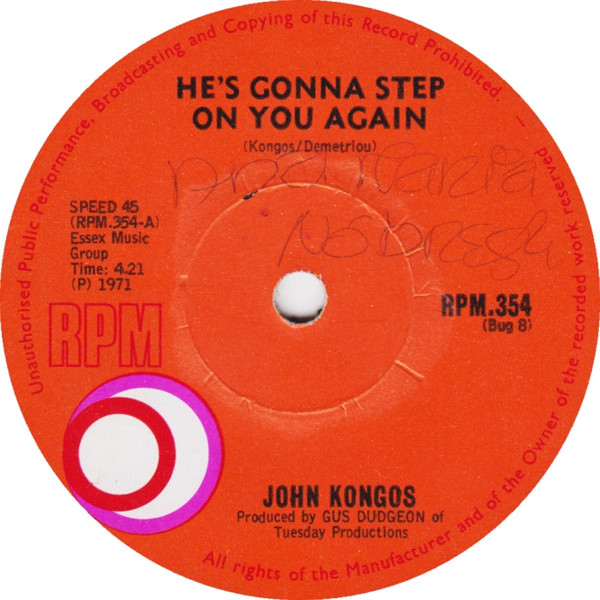
- Side A of the original South African single

Single by John Kongos

from the album Kongos
- B-side: "Sometimes It's Not Enough"
- Released: 30 April 1971
- Genre: Rock
- Length: 4:24
- Label: Fly; Ariola
- Songwriters: John Kongos; Christos Demetriou
- Producer: Gus Dudgeon

John Kongos singles chronology
"Flim Flam" (1969)	"He's Gonna Step on You Again" (1971)	"Tokoloshe Man" (1971)

Music video
- "He's Gonna Step on You Again" (French TV, 1971) on YouTube

"He's Gonna Step on You Again" (also known as "Step On") is a song originally performed by South African singer John Kongos, co-written by Kongos and Christos Demetriou, and first released in 1971 by Fly Records and featured on his second studio album, Kongos (1972). It was a hit in Kongos' native South Africa, Australia and Europe and a minor hit in North America that year, entering the UK Singles Chart on 22 May 1971 and spending 14 weeks there, peaking at No. 4. Covers of the song have been chart successes several times, including for the Happy Mondays in 1990.

It was cited in the Guinness Book of Records as being the first song to have used a sample, utilising a tape loop of African drumming.

== Chart performance ==
Chart (1971)	Peak position
Australia (Go-Set National Top 40)	2
Canada Top Singles (RPM)	77
France (IFOP)	9
Netherlands (Dutch Top 40)	27
Netherlands (Single Top 100)	22
South Africa (Springbok Radio)	2
UK Singles (Official Charts)	4
US Billboard Hot 100	70
West Germany (GfK)	26

== Cover versions ==
"He's Gonna Step on You Again"

Single by the Party Boys

from the album The Party Boys
- B-side: "Small Talk"
- Released: 18 May 1987
- Genre: Rock
- Length: 4:08
- Label: CBS
- Songwriters: John Kongos; Christos Demetriou
- Producers: Alan Lancaster; John Brewster; Paul Christie

The Party Boys singles chronology
"Kashmir" (1984)	"He's Gonna Step on You Again" (1987)	"Hold Your Head Up" (1987)

Music video
- "He's Gonna Step on You Again" on YouTube

=== 1987 Australian versions ===
In 1987 three Australian bands (the Party Boys, Chantoozies and Exploding White Mice) each released their own cover version of "He's Gonna Step on You Again". The Party Boys' single was issued in May, and peaked at No. 1, for two weeks, in late July on the Australian Music Report chart while the Chantoozies version reached No. 36.

==== The Party Boys ====
Australian rock supergroup The Party Boys released a cover version in 1987 that reached No. 1 on the Australian Music Report, No. 92 in the United Kingdom and No. 10 on the New Zealand Singles Chart and was featured on their self-titled lone studio album later the same year. The band also recorded a 12-inch single, "He's Gonna Step on You Again" (Stomp mix) with Nick Mainsbridge remixing, which was backed by "She's a Mystery".

Chart (1987)	Peak position
Australia (Australian Music Report)	1
New Zealand (Recorded Music NZ)	10
UK Singles (OCC)	92

==== Chantoozies ====
"He's Gonna Step on You Again"

Single by Chantoozies

from the album Chantoozies
- B-side: "Twenty Six 02"
- Released: 8 June 1987
- Studio: Platinum (Melbourne, Australia)
- Genre: Pop
- Length: 3:40
- Label: Mushroom
- Producer: David Courtney

Chantoozies singles chronology
"Witch Queen" (1987)	"He's Gonna Step on You Again" (1987)	"Wanna Be Up" (1988)

Music video
- "He's Gonna Step on You Again" on YouTube

Australian pop group the Chantoozies released a version in 1987 as the second single from their self-titled debut album (1988). The song peaked at number 36 on the Australian Kent Music Report.

=== Track listings ===
7-inch single (K301)

- Side A "He's Gonna Step on You Again"
- Side B "Twenty Six 02"

12-inch single (X 14504)

- Side A "He's Gonna Step on You Again" (12" version)
- Side B1 "He's Gonna Step on You Again" (7" version)
- Side B2 "Twenty Six 02"

=== Charts ===
Chart (1987)	Peak position
Australia (Australian Music Report)	36

=== Happy Mondays version ===
"Step On"

Single by Happy Mondays

from the album Pills 'n' Thrills and Bellyaches
- B-side: "Step On" (One Louder mix edit)
- Released: 26 March 1990
- Recorded: February 1990
- Studio: Eden (London, UK)
- Genre: Madchester
- Length: 4:20 (7-inch single edit); 5:19 (album version)
- Label: Factory
- Songwriters: John Kongos; Christos Demetriou
- Producers: Paul Oakenfold; Steve Osborne

Happy Mondays singles chronology
"WFL (Wrote for Luck)" (1989)	"Step On" (1990)	"Kinky Afro" (1990)

Music videos
- "Step On" (Version 1) on YouTube; "Step On" (Version 2) on YouTube

British band the Happy Mondays covered the song in 1990, retitling it "Step On", with two different music videos. It was originally intended as a contribution to the Rubáiyát: Elektra's 40th Anniversary compilation for their US label Elektra, but they decided to keep it to release as a single (and was subsequently featured on their third studio album Pills 'n' Thrills and Bellyaches), and instead covered Kongos' follow-up single "Tokoloshe Man" for the compilation. The Happy Mondays version incorporates a short sample of three guitar notes from the original.

The first music video for "Step On" was directed by the Bailey Brothers and was filmed on the roof of a hotel in Barcelona, Spain. The second, directed by Jean-Baptiste Mondino and intended for American audiences, depicts the band performing the song on a fictional Asian television programme, intercut with footage of two fans watching the performance in a bedroom.

"Step On" became Happy Mondays' biggest-selling single, peaking at No. 5 in the UK, and No. 55 and 57 on the US Cash Box Top 100 and Billboard Hot 100 charts. The lyric "you're twisting my melon, man" was used for singer Shaun Ryder's autobiography Twisting My Melon.

==== Charts ====
Weekly charts

Chart (1990–1991)	Peak position
Australia (ARIA)	157
Canada Top Singles (RPM)	64
Europe (Eurochart Hot 100)	12
Netherlands (Single Top 100)	46
UK Singles (Official Charts)	5
US Billboard Hot 100	57
US Alternative Airplay (Billboard)	9
US Dance Club Songs (Billboard)	13
US Dance Singles Sales (Billboard)	46
US Cash Box Top 100	55

Year-end charts

Chart (1990)	Position
UK Singles (OCC)	50

==== Certifications ====
Region	Certification	Certified units/sales
United Kingdom (BPI)	Platinum	600,000^{‡}
^{‡} Sales+streaming figures based on certification alone.

==== Release history ====
Region	Date	Format(s)	Label(s)	Ref.
United Kingdom	26 March 1990	7-inch vinyl; 12-inch vinyl; cassette	Factory	
Australia	30 July 1990	7-inch vinyl; 12-inch vinyl; cassette	Factory; Festival	
Japan	1 June 1991	CD (Remix '91)	Factory	

== See also ==
- List of number-one singles in Australia during the 1980s
