= Burning Up Years =

Studio album by The Human Instinct
- Released: 1969
- Recorded: Astor Studios, Auckland
- Genre: Acid rock, psychedelic rock, blues-rock, hard rock
- Length: 36:50
- Label: Marble Arch
- Producer: Guy Morris

The Human Instinct chronology
| Burning Up Years (1969) | Stoned Guitar (1970) |

Professional ratings
Review scores
| Source | Rating |
|---|---|
| Allmusic | 3/5 stars |

Burning Up Years is the debut album by New Zealand blues-rock band The Human Instinct. It was released in 1969 and reissued on CD by Ascension Records in 2001.

The album's title track is a cover of a 1969 song by Birmingham progressive rock trio Hard Meat, whose original version was the B-side of their cover of The Beatles' "Rain".

"Blues News", "Fall Down", and "Ashes and Matches" were covers of unreleased demos recorded by New Zealand guitarist Doug Jerebine under his stage name, Jesse Harper. (Jerebine's original versions were belatedly released in the 1990s.)

Other cover versions on the album were The Kinks' "You Really Got Me", Neil Young's "Everybody Knows This is Nowhere" (listed as "I Think I'll Go Back Home" and miscredited in the liner notes to Jesse Harper), and Ashton, Gardner & Dyke's "Maiden Voyage", misattributed to Maurice Greer.

"I Think I'll Go Back Home" b/w "You Really Got Me" was released as a single.

== Track listing ==
1. "Blues News" (Jesse Harper) – 3:35
2. "Maiden Voyage" (Maurice Greer) – 5:21
3. "Fall Down" (Harper) – 2:52
4. "I Think I'll Go Back Home" (Harper) – 3:21
5. "Ashes and Matches" (Harper) – 4:04
6. "You Really Got Me" (Ray Davies) – 3:24
7. "Burning Up Years" (Mike Dolan/Mick Carless/Steve Dolan) – 14:10

== Personnel ==
- Maurice Greer — vocals, drums
- Billy TK — guitar
- Peter Barton - bass
- Larry Waide — bass

Recorded at Peach-Weymess Astor Recording Studios, Nugent St Auckland 1969 Engineered by Gary Potts and Wahanui Wynyard.

Album artwork and photography by Peter Lumb.
