= Helden (band) =

1980s electronic New Wave band

- Genres: Synthpop, new wave
- Years active: 1980–1983
- Labels: ZiCa, EMI
- Past members: Warren Cann; Hans Zimmer

Helden was an electronic new wave project formed in the summer of 1980 by future successful film-musician Hans Zimmer and Ultravox drummer Warren Cann. The project also featured guest participations of singers Zaine Griff and Linda Jardim. (now: Allan)

During 1979 and 1980, Zimmer and Cann were constantly working along as part of the backing band of New Zealand singer Zaine Griff, and were also doing TV presentations as part of the guest line-up of musicians with The Buggles. With Griff, the duo were touring in 1979, played with Griff at Reading '79 Festival and played for his debut album Ashes and Diamonds, released in 1980.

In the summer of 1980, Zimmer and Cann established a 'changing project' (not a band) while discussing the possibility of writing and recording an 'adventure' album.

The following autumn of 1981 they began work on the project, recording initial material. In March 1983, the forthcoming album was announced as to be called Spies. It consisted of 12 songs, all recorded with synthesizers and computers. Some songs were purely instrumental (Mother Company, Pyramids Of The Reich, Moonlight In Vermont and Eva). The other songs had vocals by (mostly) Zaine Griff and Linda Jardim (Allan), but also Hugo Vereker and French singer Ronny. Some songs are similar to Zaine Griff's songs on the album Figvres (on which Hans Zimmer also contributed instrumental arrangements, keyboards and computers): Stranded, Borderline and Holding On. Other songs were reminiscent of the worldwide hit song "Video Killed The Radio Star" by The Buggles - to which Zimmer also contributed: Young & Scientific, 2529 and Movies for Eva, while some songs sound more theatrical and dramatic: The Ball and My Killing Hand.

The album was meant to be released in 1983, but that was cancelled. An extremely rare promo tape was completed, dated 1 February 1983 under the working title of “Spies - An act of love”, which included a 15 page background story with lyrics, and featured the following 13 tracks with the original titles: Spies, The Ball, Young & Scientific, A Killing Hand, Pyramids of the Reich, Transmission, Holding, Moonlight in Vermont, 2529, Borderline, Stranded, Movies for Eva, Eva,

Fans urged the band to release the album and when that did not happen it was later unofficially released as a bootleg. Some parts of their repertoire and BBC Radio One interviews were compiled into an unofficial compilation album called Radio One Saturday Live. A single, Holding On (a vocal duet between Zaine Griff and Linda Jardim) was officially released on their own label ZiCa Records in autumn 1983, followed by "Stranded" in 1985, which came free with issue 19 of In The City magazine.

Helden material featured Zaine Griff, Linda Jardim (now Allan), Eddie Maelov (of Gloria Mundi and Eddie And Sunshine), Ronny, Thin Lizzy guitarist Brian Robertson, among others.

After Cann and Zimmer ended the project, both went to collaborate with Spanish new wave band Mecano in their 1984-85 tour. Part of the tour was featured on the unofficial live album Mecano: En Concierto, released in 1985.

Ultravox's official fan page announced the Spies album would be released on CD for the first time with bonus material. The exact date was not mentioned, but it had been said to be in plans since 1993.

The album was re-recorded by Zaine Griff and released by Sony Music International in 2023.

== Discography ==
- Holding On 7" & 12" singles (ZiCa 001, 1983)
- Stranded 7" single (1985, re-released 2009)
- Spies album (bootleg)
