= Billy TK =

New Zealand musician

Wiremu Te Kahika, better known as Billy Te Kahika or Billy TK Senior (born 1943), is a New Zealand Māori musician, guitarist, vocalist and songwriter.

== Early work ==
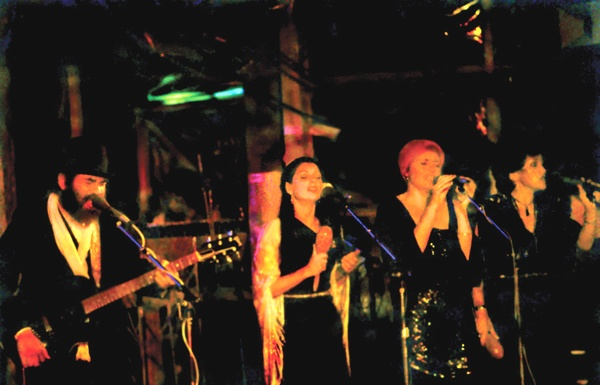
Billy TK on stage at Nambassa in 1981.

As a child, Billy TK lived in Bunnythorpe, a small town near Palmerston North, New Zealand. His surname of Te Kahika was abbreviated to 'TK' by Pākehā teachers. He was inspired to learn guitar by listening to construction workers working on nearby hydroelectric dams. He began playing guitar at an early age, and was surrounded by talented young musicians during his family's frequent visits to Rātana Pā, who helped fulfill his lust for improving his skills on his instrument. He played gigs for friends and family during his high school years, and once he had finished school, he set to build his own band.

The result of this was The Sinners with Ted Cash on drums, Sonny Ratana on bass, Harold Hine on rhythm guitar and lead vocalist Theo Swanson. The band played at 21st birthday parties and the like until being invited to play at Rickies nightclub in Palmerston North and other venues around the Manawatu. The Sinners were one of the first New Zealand bands to utilise distortion and similar guitar effects, and these effects would become a staple of Billy's guitar sound. It was around this time, in the mid-1960s, that Billy TK's friend, Ara Mete, gave Billy a gift — his first fuzz box and treble booster. Billy quickly took it to an electrical shop in Palmerston North, where he had copies of both made. Billy was hooked on the sound, and his obsession for guitar effects only received more grounding once the Jimi Hendrix album Are You Experienced? hit the airwaves in New Zealand, and Billy quickly made The Sinners learn all the tracks on the album.

== Human Instinct ==
After four years of playing together, The Sinners were reduced to a three piece band when Theo Swanson and Harold Hine both left. Billy TK then parted ways with the band to travel to Melbourne to set up a unit there called Compulsion with Paddy Beach and Reno Tehei. On Billy's return to New Zealand in May 1968, Billy TK auditioned for The Human Instinct, with Maurice Greer on vocals and bass player Frank Hay. After playing for them once, he was allowed into the band. Following a tour of the South Island and two changes of bass players, the band was ready to play the Auckland circuit, where they mesmerised their audiences with their edgy, heavily Hendrix influenced hard rock sound. The trio recorded three albums with Billy TK on guitar: Burning Up Years, Stoned Guitar and Pins In It, which made the band legendary in New Zealand.

In 1970, Human Instinct played a three nights a week residency at the Bo Peep club, Durham Lane. One occasion they were joined by guest band The Game, who had been the 1970 Battle of the Bands Auckland Winners. Human Instinct played two nights at Hatchets, 24 Cook St, also supported on one night by The Game.

In 1972, during a short tour of Australia Billy TK left Human Instinct after a series of disagreements on musical direction. He was replaced by Graeme Collins (Dedikation/Dragon). The group recorded three more albums before going into hiatus.

== Billy TK's Powerhouse ==
In 1972 he formed a new band, Billy TK's Powerhouse, playing in Wellington with former Blackfeather drummer Steve Webb from Australia, guitarist John Bilderbeck from Wanganui and Gav Collinge on bass. When Webb and Bilderbeck left, Powerhouse shifted base to Palmerston North, recruiting Ara Mete on rhythm guitar, Jamie Tait-Jamieson on keyboards, Bud Hooper on drums, Arnold Tihema on congas and lead vocals and Mahia Blackmore on vocals and percussion. The band later also featured Neal Storey (ex-Dragon) and Peter Kellington. Powerhouse supported Black Sabbath, Split Enz, John Mayall, Sonny Terry and Brownie McGhee, UB40, Joe Satriani and the Neville Brothers in concert. Keyboardist Jamie Tait-Jamieson (founder of Biofarm Products Ltd.) left the group during this period, having given up full-time musicianship to run his family farm and marry his fiancée Catherine Rowland.

Powerhouse disbanded in 1977. While they released no records during their career, an album's worth of unreleased 1972 studio recordings (all cover versions) were belatedly issued in 2009 as Move On Up. A live concert recorded in 1975 received a very limited vinyl release in 1990 as Life Beyond The Material Sky.

== Later work ==
In April 1996, TK performed a song with Carlos Santana at an Auckland concert. He has worked with several bands including Dunedin Flying Nun Records band King Loser, with whom he recorded an album, and with hip hop artist DLT. He later played at several Human Instinct reunion gigs. In November 2008 TK unexpectedly joined former Powerhouse keyboardist Jamie Tait-Jamieson (now part of the 4-piece Manawatu family group The T-Bar Jays) onstage at the inaugural Mai Farm Festival in the Pohangina Valley.

January 2008 saw Billy play with the Emma Paki Band opening the Parihaka International Peace Festival with Emma Paki, Mara TK, Jonathan Crayford, James Davenport, and others. In January 2009, Billy played again at the Parihaka International Peace Festival, this time as part of a reunited Powerhouse. In June 2010 came the release of Gordonia, a feature film with a soundtrack by Billy. The film featured two tracks with the Human Instinct and a new recording, Gordonia Electric Suite.

== Personal life ==
Billy TK is the father of Billy Te Kahika Jr., a blues guitarist and conspiracy theorist, and Mara Te Kahika (also known as Mara TK), a musician and the frontman of psychedelic-soul band Electric Wire Hustle.
