= Rubáiyát: Elektra's 40th Anniversary =

Rubáiyát

Compilation album by Various artists
- Released: September 24, 1990
- Recorded: 1990
- Genre: Various
- Length: 149:17
- Label: Elektra
- Producer: Lenny Kaye

Professional ratings
Review scores
Source	Rating
AllMusic	4.5/5 stars

Rubáiyát is a compilation album, released in 1990 to commemorate the 40th anniversary of the Elektra record label. The concept was to feature present-day Elektra artists covering songs from the historic catalogue of recordings of Elektra Records and its sister label Asylum Records.

Two long-running Elektra artists—Jackson Browne and the Cure—were featured in a double capacity. They were featured as performing artists (covering songs from Elektra's early canon) and were also represented by having songs that they had recorded for Elektra, covered by newer Elektra artists. Carly Simon was the only solo artist to have two songs covered on the collection (Note: "You Belong to Me", in turn, is a cover of a 1977 Doobie Brothers deep cut, which she co-wrote with the band's frontman Michael McDonald before recording her own version and releasing it as a single the following year.) while the Eagles were the only group to share that distinction.

A promotional version was also released featuring not only the commercially released version of the album, but also a second version featuring each recording in its original incarnation. Another promotional release was a five-song EP consisting of songs from the album redone by John Oswald using his Plunderphonics techniques. The EP's first track, "O'Hell", combined snippets of the original version of "Hello, I Love You", the cover by the Cure contained on this release, plus 17 other songs by the Doors.

The British band Happy Mondays, having covered South African musician John Kongos' 1971 hit "Tokoloshe Man" on its final cut, originally recorded a cover of its predecessor "He's Gonna Step on You Again" for the album, before deciding to instead recycle it for their studio album Pills 'n' Thrills and Bellyaches and keep it as a single (under the shortened title "Step On"), which went on to be a hit for them earlier that year, and replaced it with such cover.

Anita Baker recorded a cover of "You Belong to Me" (originally by The Doobie Brothers and popularized by Carly Simon; not to be confused with the closing track of her 1988 album Giving You the Best That I Got of the same name co-written by Terry Britten, Billy Livsey and Graham Lyle) of which she would later re-record for her 1994 album Rhyhm of Love and release as a single in 1995.

The double album was produced by Lenny Kaye, guitarist of the Patti Smith group, who also wrote the liner notes. Group Leaders of the New School, which included future hip hop star Busta Rhymes, was the lone rap act to be included on the compilation.

== Track listing ==
=== Disc 1 ===
Track #	Title	Artist	Original artist
1	"Hello, I Love You"	The Cure	The Doors (1968)
2	"The House of the Rising Sun"	Tracy Chapman	Traditional (based on the version by Glenn Yarbrough; 1957)
3	"7 and 7 Is"	Billy Bragg	Love (1966)
4	"I'd Like to Teach the World to Sing"	Jevetta Steele	The Hillside Singers (based on the version by The New Seekers; 1971)
5	"Hotel California"	Gipsy Kings	Eagles (1976)
6	"Werewolves of London"	The Black Velvet Band	Warren Zevon (1978)
7	"Motorcycle Mama"	The Sugarcubes	Sailcat (1972)
8	"One Meatball"	Shinehead	Traditional (based on the version by Josh White; 1956)
9	"Bottle of Wine"	The Havalinas	Tom Paxton (1965), popularized by The Fireballs (1967)
10	"Born in Chicago"	Pixies	Paul Butterfield Blues Band (1965)
11	"You're So Vain"	Faster Pussycat	Carly Simon (1972)
12	"Marquee Moon"	Kronos Quartet	Television (1977)
13	"Get Ourselves Together"	Phoebe Snow	Delaney & Bonnie (1968)
14	"Tokoloshe Man"	Happy Mondays	John Kongos (1971)
15	"Let's Go"	Ernie Isley	The Cars (1979)
16	"Going Down"	Lynch Mob	Don Nix and the Alabama State Troupers (1972)
17	"A Little Bit of Rain"	Arto Lindsay & The Ambitious Lovers	Fred Neil (1965)
18	"You Belong to Me"	Anita Baker	The Doobie Brothers (1977), popularized by Carly Simon (1978)
19	"Road to Cairo"	Howard Jones	David Ackles (1968)

=== Disc 2 ===
Track #	Title	Artist	Original artist
1	"Kick Out the Jams"	The Big F	MC5 (1969)
2	"Almost Saturday Night/Rockin' All Over the World"	The Georgia Satellites	John Fogerty (1975)
3	"Hello, I Am Your Heart"	Sara Hickman	Dennis Linde (1973)
4	"Make It with You"	Teddy Pendergrass	Bread (1970)
5	"The Blacksmith" (a cappella)	Linda Ronstadt	Traditional (based on the version by Kathy and Carol; 1965)
6	"Going Going Gone"	Bill Frisell, Robin Holcomb, Wayne Horvitz	Bob Dylan (1974)
7	"First Girl I Loved"	Jackson Browne	The Incredible String Band (1967)
8	"These Days"	10,000 Maniacs	Nico (1967), based on the version by Jackson Browne; (1973)
9	"Stone Cold Crazy"	Metallica	Queen (1974)
10	"Apricot Brandy"	Danny Gatton	Rhinoceros (1968)
11	"Union Man"	Shaking Family	Cate Brothers (1975)
12	"One More Parade"	They Might Be Giants	Phil Ochs (1964)
13	"I Can't Tell You Why"	Howard Hewett	Eagles (1979)
14	"Mt. Airy Groove"	Leaders of the New School	Pieces of a Dream (1982)
15	"You Brought The Sunshine"	Shirley Murdock	The Clark Sisters (1983)
16	"In Between Days"	John Eddie	The Cure (1985)
17	"Love Wars"	The Beautiful South	Womack & Womack (1983)
18	"Both Sides Now"	Michael Feinstein	Dave Van Ronk and the Hudson Dusters (as "Clouds") (1967), popularized by Judy Collins (1968), written and also recorded by Joni Mitchell (1969)
19	"T.V. Eye"	John Zorn	The Stooges (1970)
20	"Hello, I Love You" (slight return)	The Cure	The Doors (1968)
