= Ride the Lightning (John Kongos song) =

1975 single by John Kongos

Single by John Kongos
- B-side: "I Won't Ask You Where You've Been"
- Released: 11 April 1975
- Recorded: 1975
- Genre: Rock
- Length: 4:04
- Label: Cube
- Songwriters: John Kongos, Peter Leroy
- Producer: John Kongos

John Kongos singles chronology
"Higher Than God's Hat" (1972)	"Ride the Lightning" (1975)	"I No. 7 (Only Wants To Get To Heaven)" (1976)

Audio
- "Ride the Lightning" on YouTube

"Ride the Lightning" is a song written by South African musician John Kongos and Peter Leroy and originally released by Kongos on 11 April 1975 in the UK and on 11 May 1975 in Germany. While the single never charted, the subsequent French adaptation by Pierre Delanoë titled "Qu'est-ce qui fait pleurer les blondes?", performed by French pop singer Sylvie Vartan, would be a hit in France and Belgium the following year.

== Track listing ==
7" single Cube Records BUG 58 (1975, UK)

A. "Ride the Lightning" (4:04)
B. "I Won't Ask You Where You've Been" (4:30)

== Sylvie Vartan version (in French) ==
"Qu'est-ce qui fait pleurer les blondes?"

Single by Sylvie Vartan

from the album Qu'est-ce qui fait pleurer les blondes?
- Language: French
- English title: What makes blondes cry?
- B-side: "La Lettre"
- Released: February 1976
- Recorded: 1975
- Genre: Pop, disco
- Length: 3:09
- Label: RCA Victor
- Songwriters: John Kongos, Peter Leroy, Pierre Delanoë
- Producer: Jacques Revaux

Sylvie Vartan singles chronology
"Danse-la chante-la" (1975)	"Qu'est-ce qui fait pleurer les blondes?" (1976)	"L'amour c'est comme les bateaux" (1976)

Music video
- "Qu'est-ce qui fait pleurer les blondes?" (French TV, 1985) on YouTube

The song was reworked into French (as "Qu'est-ce qui fait pleurer les blondes?", which means "What makes blondes cry?") by lyricist Pierre Delanoë and recorded by French singer Sylvie Vartan. The recording was produced by Jacques Revaux.

Vartan's version was released as a single in February 1976 and was featured on her 1976 album of the same name, being the third and final single from the album.

The song spent two consecutive weeks at no. 1 on the singles sales chart in France (from 19 February to 3 March 1976). In Belgium, Vartan's version was Number 1 for three weeks and charted from 14 February 1976 and 29 May 1976.

=== Track listing ===
7" single (1976)

A. "Qu'est-ce qui fait pleurer les blondes?" (3:09)
B. "La Lettre" (3:17)

=== Charts ===
Chart (1976)	Peak position
France (SNEP)	1
Belgium (Ultratop 50 Wallonia)	1

== See also ==
- List of number-one singles of 1976 (France)
