= John Kongos =

South African musician (born 1945)

- Born: John Theodore Kongos; 6 August 1945 (age 81); Johannesburg, South Africa
- Occupations: Singer; songwriter
- Years active: 1960s–present

John Theodore Kongos (born 6 August 1945) is a South African singer and songwriter of Greek ancestry, best known for his 1971 top 10 hit single "He's Gonna Step on You Again", which has become a standard and spawned multiple successful cover versions, including by The Party Boys, the Chantoozies, and the Happy Mondays (under the shortened title "Step On"). His other big hit was "Tokoloshe Man" (which was also covered by the Happy Mondays), which was featured on the TV show Life on Mars and the CD soundtrack. His second album, Kongos, made the top 30 of the UK Albums Chart; but his subsequent singles, "Great White Lady" (30 June 1972), "Higher than God's Hat" (29 June 1973) and "Ride the Lightning" (11 April 1975) did not chart.

== Career ==
Having had success in South Africa in the early 1960s with his band Johnny and the G-Men, as well as a solo artist, Kongos went to the UK in 1966, to pursue his musical career. His first UK based group, Floribunda Rose, formed in April 1967, comprised the British musicians, Pete Clifford (guitar) (born Peter William Frederick Clifford, 10 May 1943, Whetstone, North London) and Jack Russell (bass, vocals) (born 29 April 1944, Caerleon, South Wales), who had come to South Africa in June 1965 with The 004; drummer Nick 'Doc' Dokter (born 24 July 1945, Kampen, Overijssel, the Netherlands), a latter day member of 004; and the Cyprus-born keyboard player Chris Demetriou from John E Sharpe and the Squires. After one single, "Linda Loves Linda", Clifford returned to South Africa to join The Bats and Dokter moved to Canada and worked with Five Man Cargo. Drummer Henry Spinetti joined and the remaining members recorded three singles as Scrugg.

After 18 months of gigging in Britain and Europe with his bands Floribunda Rose and Scrugg, and five singles later, he released his first solo album, Confusions About a Goldfish (1969), on the Dawn record label.

He then concentrated on songwriting, and began to have major success in Germany and other European countries (No. 1 and top 10 hits). He then moved to Fly Records with whom he had two hit singles – "He's Gonna Step on You Again" (UK No. 4, May 1971; U.S. Billboard Hot 100 No. 70) and "Tokoloshe Man" (UK No. 4, November 1971). His second album Kongos made the top 30 of the UK Albums Chart, but subsequent singles, "Great White Lady" (30 June 1972), "Higher than God's Hat" (29 June 1973) and "Ride the Lightning" (11 April 1975), did not chart. "Tomorrow I'll Go", which appeared on Kongos, was covered by New Zealand band The Human Instinct on their 1970 album Stoned Guitar, while "Ride the Lightning" (1975) was covered by Sylvie Vartan as "Qu'est-ce qui fait pleurer les blondes?" in France and was No. 1 on that chart for several weeks in 1976.

"He's Gonna Step on You Again" is cited in the Guinness Book of Records as being the first song to ever use a sample. However, according to the sleeve note of the CD reissue of the Kongos album, it is actually a tape loop of African drumming.

Kongos co-wrote the song "Charly, laß dir einen Bart steh'n" with Günther Behrle. It was recorded by German singer Daffi Cramer. Backed with "Die Straße der Träume" it was produced by Fritz Muschler and released on single, Ariola 16 780 AT in 1976. It became a hit for Cramer, making it to No. 27 in the German charts and staying there for nine weeks.

Kongos continued to work in his own London studio as a record producer, sound engineer, TV jingle and theme music composer, and songwriter, as well as handling the programming of the Fairlight CMI synthesizer on Def Leppard's 1983 album Pyromania.

He gained notice with a new musical generation in 1990, when Madchester pioneers Happy Mondays reworked "He's Gonna Step on You Again" into their baggy era defining hit "Step On", which reached No. 5 in the UK Singles Chart. In the same year, they also covered his "Tokoloshe Man", for the compilation album, Rubáiyát.

== Discography ==
His 1966–1969 work (including his recordings with Floribunda Rose and Scrugg, and his solo album Confusions About a Goldfish) was released on a compilation album, Lavender Popcorn (2001).

The album Kongos (Elektra, 1972), plus his remaining singles first issued on Fly, appeared on the CD Tokoloshe Man Plus, released by See for Miles Records in 1988.

== Personal life ==
Kongos is married to Shelley and has four sons; Johnny, Jesse, Dylan, and Daniel, who are members of the rock group Kongos.
