= The Human Instinct =

New Zealand rock band

- Origin: New Zealand
- Genres: Hard rock; psychedelic rock; blues rock
- Years active: 1969–present
- Members: Maurice Greer; Phil Pritchard; Joel Haines; Tony Baird

The Human Instinct are a New Zealand rock band that has been active since the late 1960s. The band currently consists of Maurice Greer (lead vocals and stand-up drummer), Phil Pritchard (guitar), Joel Haines (guitar) and Tony Baird (bass). The band has had more than 25 members and has changed lineups several times since its formation under the leadership of Maurice Greer.

They have released a total of seven albums and thirty singles. Their most recent album, Midnight Sun, was released October 2010.

The band is best known for their single "Black Sally" and their album Stoned Guitar, which features the Jimi Hendrix-inspired guitar work of Billy Te Kahika, professionally known as Billy TK.

== History ==
=== Early history: psychedelic pop (1966–1968) ===
The band emerged from a 1950s pop band The Four Fours, formed in Tauranga in 1958 by drummer Trevor Spitz. Lead guitarist Bill Ward joined in 1959, former police cadet Dave Hartstone became rhythm guitarist in 1960, and Frank Hay was enlisted on bass. The foursome rapidly became one of the most sought-after bands in the country.

In mid-1966 Maurice Greer, then fronting his own band The Saints, was invited to audition. He had his first group at the age of 14 and was billed as "the teenage wonder drummer". In 1964 he began experimenting with his drum kit, converting it into a stand up-unit, which he claimed was better for his vocals. As well as his drumming ability, the Four Fours were impressed with his ability to harmonise and hit high notes, talents valued by chart-topping bands of the time. He joined just in time to record their biggest hit "Go Go"/"Don’t Print My Memoirs".

The band, featuring Maurice Greer as vocalist and stand-up drummer, toured as support band for The Rolling Stones' 1966 New Zealand tour and sailed to the UK in August, changing their name en route to the Human Instinct.

The band won a recording deal with Mercury Records in 1967, releasing "Rich Man" (which New Musical Express described as a "pounding up-tempo piece with ear catching lyrics and some weird sounds"), "Can’t Stop Loving You", and a re-recording of the Four Fours' "Go Go". The band then signed with Deram Records to record "A Day in My Mind's Mind", described 30 years later by English critic Jon Savage as "a blurring of the real and fantastic, aurally reproduced by untuned raga-style guitars and a few voices".

Greer declined an offer to join the Jeff Beck Group, opting instead to return to New Zealand in September 1968 as the band disintegrated.

=== Peak of popularity: acid rock and blues rock (1969–1971) ===
Palmerston North-born Greer sought a heavier rock sound with his band’s new three-piece lineup back in New Zealand: he had enlisted guitarist and old high school friend Billy Te Kahika (who used the name Billy TK) and bassist Peter Barton.

The Human Instinct secured a role as resident band at Auckland’s Bo Peep Club, then abandoned the gig to return to Britain in February 1969, where they invested in a massive PA and lighting system. They remained there for three months, during which time they met New Zealand guitarist Jesse Harper (real name Doug Jerebine). Human Instinct would record several Harper compositions for their first two albums.

==== Burning Up Years (1969) ====
On their return to New Zealand, Greer was signed by Pye Records and entered Peach-Weymes Auckland ASTOR Studios to record their first blues-based album, Burning Up Years, which was released in late 1969. Three of the album’s seven songs were Harper compositions. (The single, "I Think I’ll Go Back Home", was a blues version of Neil Young's "Everybody Knows This Is Nowhere", but wrongly credited to Harper.)

During recording Barton was replaced on bass by Larry Waide.

Burning Up Years was recorded and mixed by staff engineers Gary Potts and Wahanui Wynyard.

==== Stoned Guitar ====
In June 1970 the band began work on their second album, Stoned Guitar, after which Waide was replaced by former Underdogs bassist Neil Edwards. The band began work on their third album, Pins in It, which was released in June 1971.

The band flew to Sydney for a three-month tour, after which TK quit the band to remain in Australia. His place was taken by keyboardist Graeme Collins, formerly of Dedikation and in 1972 of Dragon.

=== Country rock ===
In 1972 Greer changed the lineup again, enlisting guitarists Martin Hope (Fourmyula) and John Donoghue (Timberjack) and Glenn Mikkelson (a.k.a. Zaine Griff), who played bass in the band and also did vocals in some songs for a new country rock sound. The band released two more albums, 1972's Snatmin Cuthin? (an anagram of the band's name) and The Hustler (1974). A series of lineup changes took place before Greer ended the band in 1982.

A further album, Peg Leg, was belatedly released in 2001, produced from sessions originally recorded in late 1975.

=== End of hiatus (2000s) ===
Greer reformed the band in 2002 for a series of performances.

In July 2007 the Human Instinct travelled to South Korea to play on the main stage at the Pentaport Rock Festival.

In July 2009 they returned to South Korea to play on the main stage at the Jisan Valley Rock Festival.

In 2010 a new album, Midnight Sun, was released, with Maurice Greer on drums/vocals, Neil Edwards on bass and Joel Haines on guitar. There are guest appearances on the album by Billy TK, Eddie Rayner and Murray Grindlay. A box set was also released containing the three albums recorded for Zodiac Records: Snatmin Cuthin?, The Hustler, and Peg Leg.

== Discography ==
=== Albums ===
- Burning Up Years (Pye, 1969)
- Stoned Guitar (Pye, 1970)
- Pins in It (Pye, 1971)
- Snatmin Cuthin (Zodiac, 1972)
- The Hustler (Zodiac, 1974)
- Peg Leg – The Lost Tapes (Rajon, 2002)
- Midnight Sun (ODE, 2010)

=== Singles ===
- "Can't Stop Around/I Want to be Loved by You" (Mercury, 1966)
- "Rich Man"/"Illusions" (Mercury, 1966)
- "Go-Go"/"I Can't Live Without You" (Mercury, 1967)
- "A Day in My Mind's Mind/Death of the Seaside" (Deram, 1967) issued in the US on Time Records
- "Renaissance Fair/Pink Dawn" (Deram, 1968) issued in the US on Time Records
- "I Think I’ll Go Back Home"/"You Really Got Me" (Pye, 1969)
- "Midnight Sun"/"Idea" (Pye, 1970)
- "Black Sally"/"Tomorrow" (Pye, 1970)
- "Rainbow World"/"Highway" (Pye, 1971)
- "Texas Sparrow"/"Children of the World" (Pye, 1971)
- "Down the Hall on Saturday Night"/"Simple Man" (Zodiac, 1972)
- "Tropical Paradise"/"Dixie Holiday" (Family, 1975)

== Band members ==
=== Current lineup ===
- Maurice Greer – lead vocals and drums (1966–present)
- Phil Pritchard – guitar (2002–present)
- Joel Haines – guitar (1998, 2010–present)
- Tony Baird – bass (2007–present)

=== Former members ===
- Dave Hartstone – lead vocals, guitar (1966–1968)
- Bill Ward – lead guitar, vocals (1966–1968)
- Frank Hay – bass, vocals (1966–1969) (Deceased)
- Billy Te Kahika – lead guitar, vocals (1969–1971, 2002, tours)
- Michael Brown – bass (1971)
- Peter Barton – bass (1971)
- Larry Waide – bass (1971) (Deceased)
- Neil Edwards – bass, vocals (1971–1973 198?, 2002–2005)
- Graeme Collins – keyboard (1973) (Deceased)
- Martin Hope – lead guitar, vocals (1973–?)
- Glenn Mikkelson aka Zaine Griff – bass, vocals
- John Donaghue – lead guitar, vocals
- Phil Whitehead – lead guitar
- Steve McDonald – keyboard, vocals
- Peter Cuddihy – bass, vocals
- Andrew Kaye – keyboard, vocals (Deceased)
- Chris Gunn – bass
- Malcolm Weatherall – bass
- Len Whittle – keyboard
- John Parker – lead guitar
- Kevin Furey – lead guitar
- Steve Hubbard – lead guitar
- Murray Hancox – keyboard
- Stuart Pearce – keyboard
- Peter Woods – keyboard
- Wayne Carr Human Instinct Roadie (1967 - 1975)
