= Happy Mondays discography =

Discography of English rock band Happy Mondays

English rock band Happy Mondays have released five studio albums, four live albums and seven compilation albums.

== Albums ==
=== Studio albums ===
Title	Details	Chart positions							Certification
Title	Details	UK	UK Indie	AUS	AUT	NZ	SWE	US	Certification
Squirrel and G-Man Twenty Four Hour Party People Plastic Face Carnt Smile (White Out)	Released: April 1987; Label: Factory (FAC 170); Format: CD, CS, DL, LP	—	4	—	—	—	—	—	
Bummed	Released: November 1988; Label: Factory (FAC 220); Format: CD, CS, DAT, DL, LP	59	2	—	—	—	—	—	BPI: Silver
Pills 'n' Thrills and Bellyaches	Released: 5 November 1990; Label: Factory (FAC 320); Format: CD, CS, DL, LP	4	—	98	30	27	41	89	BPI: Platinum
Yes Please!	Released: 21 September 1992; Label: Factory (FAC 420); Format: CD, CS, DL, LP	14	—	99	—	—	—	—	
Uncle Dysfunktional	Released: 2 July 2007; Label: Sequel (SEQ012); Format: CD, DL, LP	73	—	—	—	—	—	—	
"–" denotes releases that did not chart or were not released in that territory.

=== Live albums ===
Title	Details	Chart positions
Title	Details	UK
Live	Released: 30 September 1991; Label: Factory (FACT 322); Format: CD, CS, DL, LP	21
Step On – Live in Barcelona	Released: 22 August 2005; Label: Snapper Music (SMA905); Format: CD, DL, DVD-V	—
Hallelujah It's the Happy Mondays	Released: 30 April 2012; Label: Secret Records (SECDP050); Format: CD/DVD-V; Combines the Step On – Live in Barcelona CD and DVDs	—
Live at Brixton Academy 10.05.2012	Released: 2012; Label: Concert Live (CLCD427); Format: 2CDR, LP (released on Record Store Day 2015)	—
"–" denotes releases that did not chart or were not released in that territory.

=== Compilation albums ===
Title	Details	Chart positions	
Title	Details	UK	
Double Easy – The U.S. Singles	Released: 22 September 1993; Label: Elektra (61543); Format: CD, CS, DL	—	
Loads	Released: 1995; Label: Factory Once/London (520 036); Format: CD, Double CD, CS, DL	41	
Greatest Hits	Released: 19 June 1999; Label: London (556 105); Format: CD, CS, DL	11	BPI: Gold
The Platinum Collection	Released: 5 December 2005; Label: WEA (5101-11729); Format: CD, DL	19	
Double Double Good: The Best of Happy Mondays	Released: 29 June 2012; Label: Rhino UK (2564658951); Format: CD, DL	—	
The Early EP's	Released: 25 October 2019; Label: London Record; Format: LP	—	
The Factory Singles	Released: 5 December 2025; Label: London; Format: 2×CD, 2×LP	56	
"–" denotes releases that did not chart or were not released in that territory.

== Extended plays ==
Title	Year	Chart position	
Title	Year	UK	UK Indie
Forty Five	1985	—	—
Madchester Rave On	1989	19	1
Hallelujah	1989	—	—
The Peel Sessions 1989	1990	79	—
The Peel Sessions 1991	1991	—	—
"–" denotes releases that did not chart.

== Singles ==
Title	Year	Chart positions								Certifications	Album
Title	Year	UK	UK Indie	AUS	NL	NZ	US Hot 100	US Alt	US Dance	Certifications	Album
"Freaky Dancin'"	1986	—	—	—	—	—	—	—	—		Non-album single
"Tart Tart"	1987	—	13	—	—	—	—	—	—		Squirrel and G-Man...
"24 Hour Party People"	1987	—	10	—	—	—	—	—	—		Squirrel and G-Man...
"Wrote for Luck"	1988	128	7	—	—	—	—	—	—		Bummed
"Lazyitis"	1989	85	6	—	—	—	—	—	—		Bummed
"W.F.L. (Wrote for Luck)" (re-mix)	1989	68	3	—	—	—	—	—	—		Bummed
"Lazyitis (One-Armed Boxer)" (with Karl Denver)	1990	46	—	—	—	—	—	—	—		Non-album single
"Step On"	1990	5	—	157	46	—	57	9	13	BPI: Platinum	Pills 'n' Thrills and Bellyaches
"Kinky Afro"	1990	5	—	63	—	34	—	1	—	BPI: Silver	Pills 'n' Thrills and Bellyaches
"Loose Fit"	1991	17	—	117	71	—	—	—	—		Pills 'n' Thrills and Bellyaches
"Bob's Yer Uncle" (US promo only)	1991	—	—	—	—	—	—	23	25		Pills 'n' Thrills and Bellyaches
"Judge Fudge"	1991	24	—	181	—	—	—	—	—		Non-album single
"Stinkin' Thinkin'"	1992	31	—	110	—	—	—	21	1		Yes Please!
"Sunshine and Love"	1992	62	—	183	—	—	—	—	5		Yes Please!
"The Boys Are Back in Town"	1999	24	—	—	—	—	—	—	—		Greatest Hits
"24 Hour Party People" (Jon Carter mix)	2002	97	—	—	—	—	—	—	—		24 Hour Party People soundtrack
"Playground Superstar"	2005	51	—	—	—	—	—	—	—		Goal! soundtrack
"Jellybean"	2007	—	—	—	—	—	—	—	—		Uncle Dysfunktional
"Dysfunktional Uncle"	2007	—	—	—	—	—	—	—	—		Uncle Dysfunktional
"Ooo La La to Panama" (with Emberá people)	2015	—	—	—	—	—	—	—	—		Non-album single
"–" denotes releases that did not chart or were not released in that territory.
