= Happy Mondays – Excess All Areas: A Biography =

2014 book by Simon Spence

- Paperback edition
- Author: Simon Spence
- Language: English
- Subject: Happy Mondays
- Genre: Biography, music
- Publisher: Aurum Press
- Publication date: 30 October 2014
- Publication place: United Kingdom
- Media type: Print
- Pages: 352 (hardcover/paperback); 525 (ebook)
- ISBN: 978-1-78131-499-9
- OCLC: 918594803
- Website: Official website

Happy Mondays – Excess All Areas: A Biography is a 2014 book about the history of British rock band Happy Mondays, authored by British writer Simon Spence. It was based on interviews conducted in 2013 and 2014 with members of the band and their associates. It covers their main period of activity, from their formation in the early 1980s until their break up in the early 1990s, as well as detailing the history of Factory Records and its founder Tony Wilson. The book received mainly positive reviews from music publications, several of which praised Spence's research. Paperback and an expanded ebook versions were released in 2015 and 2018, respectively.

== Background and writing ==
Simon Spence served as a music journalist during the Madchester era, writing pieces for the likes of The Face, The Independent and NME. He worked with former Rolling Stones manager Andrew Loog Oldham on two memoirs, Stoned (1998) and 2Stoned (2001), as well as War and Peace (2012), a biography on the Stone Roses that received accolades by publications such as Financial Times and The Times. Spence was aware of Twisting My Melon (2011) and Freaky Dancin' (1998), autobiographies by Happy Mondays frontman Shaun Ryder and dancer Bez, respectively, alongside other biographies on the band. He felt there was a gap for a Happy Mondays-focused work; Spence received encouragement from Central Station Design co-founder Pat Carroll, the Donnelly Brothers and Keith Jobling of the Bailey Brothers to pursue a book on the band.

Throughout 2013 and 2014, Spence conducted interviews with three members of the band, namely guitarist Mark Day, bassist and Shaun's brother Paul Ryder and drummer Gary Whelan. Alongside this, he also interviewed former managers Phil Saxe and Nathan McGough, Ryder's father Derek Ryder, EMI Records executive Clive Black and producer Steve Osbourne, among others. Paul Ryder said he would spend three hours per day, five days a week on the phone with Spence, which he hoped would "set a lot of things straight regarding the band’s history". He added that Spence did not wish to interview Shaun Ryder, as "he only wanted to interview the [other members of the] band".

Spence interviewed Paul Ryder and Whelan on-and-off over a period of a few months, both of whom did ten separate sessions. Whelan introduced Spence to Day, who let Spence look through the Happy Mondays material he had saved, including early band rehearsal tapes. Though Spence met keyboardist Paul Davis, he said Davis did not contribute to the writing and regretted that he could not get Davis to discuss his time. Day, Ryder and Whelan were then sent transcripts to correct, totalling 300 pages between them. Collectively, Spence spent around a year conducting interviews and researching material for the book.

== Content and publication ==
Happy Mondays – Excess All Areas: A Biography covers the band's main period of activity, 1982 to 1993, with the years following covered by an afterword. The history of the band is broken into three sections: Pure Boys, Madchester and Stardust. The first is centred around their formation in Day's attic, early rehearsals and performances; the second details their growth between their first two albums, Squirrel and G-Man Twenty Four Hour Party People Plastic Face Carnt Smile (White Out) (1987) and Bummed (1988); and the third covers working with Osbourne and Paul Oakenfold on their third album Pills 'n' Thrills and Bellyaches until their failed deal with EMI.

After turning in his first draft of the book, Robin Harvie, Spence's editor at Aurum Press, focused on three particular aspects to "address with real clarity: evaluate the cultural importance of the band, give a snapshot of Britain and separate myth from reality". He felt that the music publications of the time rarely reported on facts about the band, having read nearly every interview about them from period. He wanted to present the band's drug consumption without conviction; he was adverse to this from working on Stoned and 2Stoned, and attempted to convey why the band went to such excess. In addition to the band, Spence weaved in the history of their label Factory Records and its founder Tony Wilson. It featured previously unpublished photographs of the ban, obtained from the various members. It was first printed as a hardback edition on 30 October 2014 by Aurum Press, with a paperback iteration following in June 2015, and a "definitive", expanded version being released as an ebook in February 2018 by Better Publications.

== Reception ==
The Sunday Times writer Louis Wise said Spence "places the mad energy of the band (fights, fallouts and, yes, a freighter’s worth of drugs) in the context of the late Thatcher years. Witty and gritty". In a review for Mojo, journalist Roy Wilkinson said the book was "built on fascinating – and convincingly detailed – perspective, a solid foundation for a tale of musical innovation, astonishing misadventure and the bewildering behaviour" of Ryder. PopMatters contributor Marcus Smith said it was a "well researched, elegantly written history of the Mancunian band", praising Spence for withholding "hyperbole, he doesn't indulge his deep enthusiasm for the Mondays, but presents their story without needless embellishment".

Louder Than War reviewer Carl Stanley felt the band's history had been told through Ryder and Bez, instead of the others members, which Spence helped to rectify. Jake Kennedy of Record Collector said that Spence's method to writing a "music biography and his clear passion for the music make this a more than suitable follow up" to War and Peace. Though he noted that interviews with Ryder and Bez were absent, the "rest of the Mondays – and a wide range of their associates – are present and correct here". Spectrum Culture's Colin Fitzgerald was confused by the book being "unsure of what it wants to say about the Mondays, whether to vilify or lionize an openly destructive group of young men". While he acknowledged that Spence helped to dispels myths around the band, he lambasted the author for not condoning the band's drug habits and antics.

Record Collector included the book on their list of the best books in 2014. Ryder criticized his bandmates for participating in the book, suggesting that they would have made money from writing their own as he had a publishing deal from his autobiography. Spence retorted that Ryder "seemed put out that he wasn’t the centre of attention or involved in the deal". In a later interview, Ryder said "[t]he guy who wrote that book should've done his homework properly".
