= Squirrel and G-Man Twenty Four Hour Party People Plastic Face Carnt Smile (White Out) =

Studio album by Happy Mondays
- Released: April 1987
- Recorded: December 1986
- Studios: Fire House, London
- Genres: Punk-funk; post-punk
- Length: 36:12
- Label: Factory
- Producer: John Cale

Happy Mondays chronology
Forty Five EP (1985)	Squirrel and G-Man Twenty Four Hour Party People Plastic Face Carnt Smile (White Out) (1987)	Bummed (1988)

Singles from Squirrel and G-Man Twenty Four Hour Party People Plastic Face Carnt Smile (White Out)
- 1. "Tart Tart" Released: March 1987; 2. "24 Hour Party People" Released: 12 October 1987

Squirrel and G-Man Twenty Four Hour Party People Plastic Face Carnt Smile (White Out) is the debut studio album by the English rock band Happy Mondays, which was released in mid-April 1987 by Factory Records. After finalising their line-up, the band began playing local venues in Manchester, toured with New Order, and released an EP and a single in 1985. Happy Mondays' debut album was recorded at Fire House in London in December 1986 with producer John Cale. Halfway through the two weeks of sessions, they scrapped all their recordings and began again. Cale and engineer Dave Young did not understand the band members' vision of the album, and found them difficult to work with. Deemed a punk-funk and post-punk album, most of its songs were lyrically akin to stories on The Twilight Zone.

Squirrel and G-Man Twenty Four Hour Party People Plastic Face Carnt Smile (White Out) received generally-positive reviews from music critics; some liked Happy Mondays' musicianship, and others were indifferent about Cale's production. The album sold 3,500 copies within six months of release, and "Tart Tart" was released as its lead single in March 1987. It gave the band national exposure when its music video was played on Channel 4's The Chart Show. Over the next five months, Happy Mondays headlined shows and supported a number of bands; the most notable were two dates supporting New Order, one of which was an all-day benefit hosted by Factory Records. "24 Hour Party People" was released as the album's second single in October 1987.

== Background ==
At age 16, Shaun Ryder left school in 1978 and found a job with his father at a post office. Two years later, he formed a band with his brother Paul Ryder on bass, their cousin Matt Carroll on guitar, and the Ryders' father's drum machine. Paul joined his brother at the post office after finishing his education. Mark Day began working at the post office in 1981, and quickly joined the band on guitar. When they were rehearsing in Day's attic by early 1982, they called themselves Something in the Attic. Carroll left after a few more rehearsals, after naming the band Avant-Garde. Shaun learned about drummer Gary Whelan through his fiancé's sister; she and Day separately asked Whelan to join them. By the end of 1982, the band – now named Penguin Dice – were writing original material. Their name was changed to Happy Laws in early 1983, and eventually to Happy Mondays.

The band talked about Whelan's schoolmate, Paul Davis, whom Shaun Ryder saw around the neighbourhood. Davis attended a few rehearsals before joining the band on keyboards. After meeting them at a club, Phil Saxe became the band's manager. Over the next 18 months, the band performed at venues across Manchester such as the Boardwalk and the International and supported New Order on the last date of their United Kingdom tour in January 1985. Saxe met Mike Pickering, who was working in A&R for Factory Records, and told him about Happy Mondays. Factory founder Tony Wilson and directors Rob Gretton and Alan Erasmus saw the band at the Haçienda, and were impressed. Happy Mondays released their debut EP, Forty Five EP (produced by Pickering), on Factory in September 1985.

Happy Mondays met Mark "Bez" Berry through their mutual friend, Little Mini; Bez had attended school with Davis, Day and Whelan. At the band's next gig, Bez was invited to dance on stage because Shaun Ryder had a bad acid trip earlier that evening. The latter befriended Terry Hall, whom he knew from Hall's work with the Specials and Fun Boy Three. Ryder and the rest of Happy Mondays (with Bez in tow) supported Hall on tour with his newest outfit, the Colourfield, studying the band's stage presence in an attempt to improve their own. Happy Mondays' next single, the Bernard Sumner-produced "Freaky Dancin'", was released in June 1986. It had wah-wah guitar over a backbeat, which could potentially become the band's core sound. During a promotional shoot while producing the song, Bez graduated from being the band's friend to becoming their percussionist and dancer.

== Recording ==
Vini Reilly of Happy Mondays' labelmates, the Durutti Column, was touted as the producer of the band's upcoming debut album. Happy Mondays, however, wanted to enlist Sumner again; he took a temporary break from producing to focus on New Order's Brotherhood (1986). Sumner had worked on remixes for other acts, and mixed From the Hip (1984) by Section 25; both projects were too energy-consuming, and he felt that his efforts were best spent working with New Order. Sumner was also concerned that he would accidentally make Happy Mondays sound closer in style to New Order. Wilson, who had shifted his focus to new signees the Railway Children and Miaow, suggested Reilly despite reservations about Happy Mondays' debut. Reilly met the band; he was dismayed by their attitude, and criticised Day's guitar playing. Shaun Ryder said that he was initially brought in to produce "Freaky Dancin'" before Sumner, but "only lasted about two hours before he decided he couldn't handle us". Wilson searched through his record collection to find a suitable producer for Happy Mondays' debut album. After comparing Ryder's lyrics with those by Patti Smith, Wilson thought of John Cale, who had produced Smith and was a member of the Velvet Underground.

Wilson theorised that if the album sold poorly after release, it would be ensured steady sales in the years that followed by having Cale's name attached to it. Saxe saw Happy Mondays as Manchester's answer to New York's Velvet Underground. Concerned that Wilson would not accept Cale as the producer, Saxe asked Sumner to suggest Cale on his behalf. Wilson knew Cale, because he had appeared on Wilson's So It Goes programme for Granada Television. Happy Mondays recorded at Fire House in London over two weeks in December 1986. Cale picked the studio because he had been in a band with its owner, Dave Young. The sessions cost £6,000 and were produced by Cale; Young was the engineer, with assistance from Zuni and Andy Kelly.

Factory set Happy Mondays up in a Belsize Park house, with the band living in one room and electricians and builders living in the other rooms. Day was the only band member with a full-time job by this point, and could afford food; the others resorted to theft. The first two days consisted of playing songs for Cale, who was impressed with Day's skills. After the first week, they scrapped their efforts and began again. Young was bewildered by the band's performances, saying that its members did not seem to know what they were playing much of the time. Cale found it difficult to work with Shaun Ryder; he liked his voice, but was unable to follow the lyrics. Ryder wrote them on pieces of scrap paper before discarding them, leaving Cale unable to see if they could be improved. Many of his vocals included ad-libs (making it difficult to re-do a specific line), and Ryder said that he had forgotten what he sang moments before.

The band wanted to make a rap version of "Little Matchstick Owen" after recording it, and Pickering suggested enlisting London-based Three Wise Men. The studio's window cleaner said that he could rap, however, to the band's surprise. Mike Bleach then rapped over this new version, which was renamed "Little Matchstick Owen's Rap". Wilson regretted using Cale, because he "didn't have a fucking clue what was going on" and did not understand the band or their vision of the album. Shaun Ryder was the only band member who was aware of Cale's previous work, and did not want to waste "weeks in some studio grafting away, fuck that". Wilson attempted to visit the band during recording, but was unable to find the studio. He regretted this, since he was disappointed with the final recordings and "stunned by how incredibly lame the songs were"; they "sounded really thin and amateur". Ryder said that Cale captured their live sound "pretty much", and "didn't do much" to enhance their performances. Cale was struggling with sobriety, and ate tangerines as a result; the band complained that all he would do was sit around and eat the fruit.

== Composition and lyrics ==
=== Overview ===
The sound of Squirrel and G-Man Twenty Four Hour Party People Plastic Face Carnt Smile (White Out) has been described as mixing the punk-funk of ESG with the atmosphere of Joy Division. Classic Pop Mag described its sound as "rough-around-the-edges funky post-punk." In his biography of the band, Shaun Ryder: Happy Mondays, Black Grape & Other Traumas, Mick Middles referred to album as "a thousand nights, drunk on funk, dull thuds and a wandering bass, [with] a wholly intoxicated ... sound". It has many characteristics which would be developed on the band's second studio album, Bummed (1988), such as Shaun Ryder's seemingly-nonsensical lyrics combined with funk rhythms. Ryder said that house music was seeping into club nights, although the band was unable to bring that influence into their songs because they were insufficiently competent. He attributed the pauses in the songs to attempts to emulate the music of the Doors. In hindsight, he said that it could be viewed as latter-day indie rock: "At the time, indie [rock] meant, tight, fast, neat music" while the band sought to have a "really spacious, trippy sound".

During their live performances, the band would unintentionally play songs longer than necessary; Shaun Ryder said that they "could never get the timing right to end a song together". He freestyled lyrics over these extended versions, and new songs would evolve from the freestyles. They recorded the shows, and worked on material during practice sessions. The album's title is partially the result of Little Mini. He visited them, took one look, and exclaimed: "Fucking hell, twenty-four hour party people, plastic people carnt smile a white out ...." The full title had a number of references; "Squirrel" is the nickname of Davis' mother, "G-Man" alludes to Bez's father being a police officer, "Twenty Four Hour Party People" is a synonym for the band, and "Plastic Face" and "Carnt Smile" were two truncated Salford expressions meaning "miserable bastards". Ryder considered the sentence a joke before liking the sound of it as an album title, which "[k]ind of summed the whole thing up".

=== Songs ===
Shaun Ryder said that most of the lyrics were crafted "like short stories from The Twilight Zone". The title of "Kuff Dam" comes from a pornographic magazine, Mad Fuck, which Ryder had read years earlier and decided to spell the name backwards. Ryder saw it as an attempt to find his voice, something he felt more important than trying to fit a story into a song. "Tart Tart" is partially inspired by a girl, Dinah, who dealt drugs and gave Bez and Ryder a place to stay. A couple of lines address her death, which resulted from a brain hemorrhage. The song is also about the UK AIDS crisis and Martin Hannett. Ryder had not met Hannett, but Sumner told stories about him. "'Enery" tackles sexually-transmitted diseases, of which Ryder was aware through friends.

The drums in "Russell" recall those in Movement-era (1981) New Order. Its lyrics are taken verbatim from the blurb of Russell Grant's book, Your Sun Signs. Whelan said that Shaun Ryder saw the book at the Boardwalk and began reading its back cover aloud. "Olive Oil" has been compared to fellow Manchester band the Smiths. Its title was inspired by a girl the band knew who had large eyes and feet. The jangly guitar work in "Weekend S" is reminiscent of the indie scene at the time, and its name was shortened from "The Weekend Starts Here". The song is based on Ryder's visits to Manchester clubs and bars during the early 1980s. Paul Ryder copied the bass line in Marvin Gaye's "Got to Give It Up" (1977) for "Little Matchstick Owen", which was named after Welsh boxer Johnny Owen.

"Oasis" originated from a jam session in Whelan's bedroom, and is named after a city market at which his friend worked. An earlier version had appeared on the Forty Five EP two years before, with lyrics from "It's Not Unusual" (1965) by Tom Jones which were omitted from the album. "Desmond" has a melody similar to "Ob-La-Di, Ob-La-Da" (1968) by the Beatles. The song is about a character known as "Eddie the Breakdancer"; Whelan disliked it, feeling that the band did not perfect it in the studio. "24 Hour Party People" deals with people on the dole who prefer partying to looking for work. Shaun Ryder felt that he found his voice with the song, instead of writing what others expected him to. The introduction of "Cob 20", the closing track, evokes the Cure. Its title refers to a school friend of the Ryders who would ride his sister's Raleigh Twenty bicycle.

== Release ==
Happy Mondays began 1987 with two shows in Manchester and London in January and February, respectively. "Tart Tart" was released as the lead single from their forthcoming album on 12" vinyl, with "Little Matchstick Owen's Rap" as the B-side, in March of that year. In his 2006 book, Factory Records: The Complete Graphic Album, Matthew Robertson wrote that the "intensely acidic colour background" of the artwork was adapted from a TV screen as its "horizontal emphasis evokes a sense of landscape", and the "overlaid painted sections" are a response to its music "in an attempt to capture an essence of frustration". In the music video for "Tart Tart", filmed at Strawberry Studios, Shaun Ryder's lip-synching is imposed over footage of the other band members in winter scenery. Happy Mondays received national exposure for the first time when the video was played on Channel 4's The Chart Show.

Squirrel and G-Man Twenty Four Hour Party People Plastic Face Carnt Smile (White Out) was released by Factory Records in mid-April 1987. Its initial vinyl version had a removable PVC sleeve with the band's name and the album's title in large, bold letters. Central Station Design (who created the artwork) suggested this sleeve, anticipating pushback from the label over its cost. The cover had an array of cakes and trifles, and the back cover had a tray of fish. Robertson said that the two images "suggest the humorous and hyperactive temperament" of the band members. Iain Ellis of PopMatters said that Central Station Design "introduce a spot-effects technique into the background", evoking the work of Roy Lichtenstein.

The first 3,000 copies of Squirrel and G-Man Twenty Four Hour Party People Plastic Face Carnt Smile (White Out) were released with "Desmond", which received attention for the song's similarity to the Beatles' "Ob-La-Di, Ob-La-Da". Factory received a writ from lawyers for Michael Jackson, who owned Northern Songs (the Beatles' music publisher). Saxe said that they had received authorization for the melody by telephone; Factory promised to destroy all copies with the song, but did not do so. They drafted Young to quickly record the replacement track, "24 Hour Party People", at Suite Sixteen Studios in Rochdale, and the album was re-released on 5 May 1987. Happy Mondays toured the UK in April and May of that year with a mixture of headlining shows and supporting slots for the Fall, the Farm and the Weather Prophets.

The band supported New Order at an all-day benefit show in London organised by Factory on 6 June 1987, and supported them again three days later in Glasgow. They flew to the United States to appear at a showcase gig run by Wilson in New York City on 15 July 1989. It was played in the midst of a city-wide New Music Seminar in an attempt to secure licensing deals for the band's releases in North America. Factory released the sampler album Young, Popular & Sexy with "Kuff Dam" after New Order's commercial breakthrough in the US. The show went poorly, with several members becoming ill; the equipment they hired did not show up, and the gear they could find did not work properly. A handful of headlining shows followed in July and August 1987.

"24 Hour Party People" was released as the second single from Squirrel and G-Man Twenty Four Hour Party People Plastic Face Carnt Smile (White Out) on 12 October 1987 on 12" vinyl, with "Yahoo" and "Wah Wah (Think Tank)" its B-sides. Factory took on two film-makers, Keith Jobling and Phil Sotton, who were known as the Bailey Brothers; they had worked on videos for the Smiths album, The Queen Is Dead (1986). Tony Wilson saw Happy Mondays live with the duo, telling them that he wanted to make a music video for "24 Hour Party People". The Bailey Brothers were impressed with the band's performance, and signed up for the task. They filmed the band driving an Oldsmobile in Ancoats, with footage from a passenger's perspective filmed later. The single was promoted with a UK tour that month, their first headlining tour in the country. Happy Mondays ended 1987 with two shows at Warrington and Manchester in December. They played four shows in 1988: a supporting slot for Stump in February and three headlining shows in May.

=== Reissues and related releases ===
Squirrel and G-Man Twenty Four Hour Party People Plastic Face Carnt Smile (White Out) was released on CD in 1990, and was reissued in 2000 by London Recordings. It was part of Rhino Records' Original Album Series box set in 2013, which collected the band's first four studio albums. The album was reissued on vinyl in 2020. "Tart Tart" and "24 Hour Party People" were reissued on vinyl in 2019 as part of the band's The Early EPs compilation. After Paul Ryder's death in July 2022, Whelan's brother Jase suggested that "Tart Tart" could be reissued to honour him. On 28 July 2022, "Tart Tart" was released as a single with the album version, a BBC version and a live version as its B-sides. Its profits were donated to MusiCares, an organization which helps people in the music industry who are dealing with addiction.

"24 Hour Party People" appeared alone on Happy Mondays' first and third compilation albums, Double Easy – The U.S. Singles (1993) and Greatest Hits (1999). "Kuff Dam", "Tart Tart" and "24 Hour Party People" were included on their second compilation album, Loads (1995). "Tart Tart" and "24 Hour Party People" are on the band's fourth compilation album, The Platinum Collection (2005). "Olive Oil" and "24 Hour Party People" were included on their fifth compilation album, Double Double Good: The Best of Happy Mondays (2012).

== Reception ==
Professional ratings
Review scores
Source	Rating
AllMusic	3.5/5 stars
Alternative Rock	8/10
The Encyclopedia of Popular Music	3/5 stars
The Great Rock Discography	8/10
MusicHound Rock	1/5 stars
Record Mirror	3.5/5
The Rolling Stone Album Guide	2/5 stars
Sounds	4/5 stars

Squirrel and G-Man Twenty Four Hour Party People Plastic Face Carnt Smile (White Out) received generally-positive reviews from music critics. AllMusic reviewer Ned Raggett said that Cale managed to "capture the cluttering mess" of Happy Mondays' "approach well enough"; author Dave Thompson, in his book Alternative Rock (2000), noted Cale's "manic production". Sounds writer Ron Rom said that the album was "full of bitter disdain and sardonic, esoteric arrogance," with Cale's "unremarkable production" doing "little to cut through the gloom". He added that the band "hit hard, ... and they rarely miss" with "[s]cruffy council estate vocals" from Shaun Ryder. The Observer's John Savage called the album the "finest flowering to date" of any Manchester act.

Melody Maker reviewer Paul Mathur called Shaun Ryder's lyrics a "source of haphazardly magical beauty, mixing bluntness and oblique suggestion with a certain shuffled cliche". Record Mirror writer Nancy Culp said that his lyrics "come across as the most bleak and hopeless this side of a Cure record"; "putting aside the fact that you feel like wrenching the damn record off after three tracks," the album had "something curiously addictive". Andy Darling of City Limits wrote that the songs would sound "great live", however, "on record it fails". Trouser Press reviewers Doug Brod and Michael Krugman called the album "unimaginative" and "often unlistenable", with "no apparent flourishes" from Cale.

Squirrel and G-Man Twenty Four Hour Party People Plastic Face Carnt Smile (White Out) peaked at number four on the UK Independent Albums Chart. "Tart Tart" peaked at number 13 on the Independent Singles Chart, and "24 Hour Party People" reached number ten. Ten thousand copies of the album were pressed, although only 3,500 were sold within six months of release. The Railway Children had moved to Virgin Records and Miaow had broken up by this point, and Wilson saw no commercial potential in Happy Mondays. By the end of 1987, the album had sold 5,000 copies. Although the band had success in the media, it did not translate into sales. Shaun Ryder said, "I thought that [the positive attention from music publications] meant loads of money would come in, but it meant absolutely fuck all".

PopMatters listed "24 Hour Party People" at 92nd on their list of 100 Best Alternative Singles of the 1980s. The track lent its name to the film 24 Hour Party People (2002), a fictional retelling of the band's history with Factory Records and the label's other acts. A remix of "24 Hour Party People" by Jon Carter, released on 12-inch vinyl in May 2002 to coincide with the film, charted in the UK at number 97.

== Track listing ==
All tracks written by Happy Mondays. All recordings produced by John Cale.

Side one

1. "Kuff Dam" – 3:06
2. "Tart Tart" – 4:25
3. "'Enery" – 2:22
4. "Russell" – 4:53
5. "Olive Oil" – 2:36

Side two

6. "Weekend S" – 2:23
7. "Little Matchstick Owen" – 3:42
8. "Oasis" – 3:45
9. "24 Hour Party People" – 4:40
10. "Cob 20" – 4:20

Notes

- The album was originally released without the track "24 Hour Party People". In its place was "Desmond", which borrowed heavily from "Ob-La-Di, Ob-La-Da" (1968) by the Beatles.
- "Little Matchstick Owen's Rap" is listed on the compact disc and cassette editions but does not appear on the release itself. The track can be found as the B-side to "Tart Tart".

== Personnel ==
Personnel per sleeve.

Happy Mondays

- Shaun Ryder – vocals
- Paul Ryder – bass
- Mark Day – guitar
- Gary Whelan – drums
- Paul Davis – keyboards
- Mark "Bez" Berry – percussion

Production

- John Cale – producer
- Zuni – assistant engineer
- Andy Kelly – assistant engineer
- Dave Young – engineer
- Central Station Design – artwork

== Charts ==
Chart performance for Squirrel and G-Man Twenty Four Hour Party People Plastic Face Carnt Smile (White Out)
Chart (1987)	Peak position
UK Independent Albums Charts	4
