= Central Station Design =

The "Madchester" logo

Central Station Design is a Mancunian design company founded by Pat Carroll, Karen Jackson, and Matt Carroll. It is usually associated with Factory Records and the Madchester scene of the early 1990s. The company created album cover artwork and posters for Factory artists including The Happy Mondays, Black Grape, and James. Their design for the Happy Mondays' Madchester Rave On E.P. in late 1989 became the iconic logo for the movement. Their work came to represent the movement so clearly that Factory Records owner and radio presenter Tony Wilson said, "The second half of the Factory story is best summed up by the painterly eccentricity of Central Station." Speaking about Manchester in the 1980s and 1990s, Karen Jackson said, "At some point you need an incubator and a home for all this energy, which for us became Factory Records, Dry Bar and The Haçienda. Tony Wilson articulated the value of this energy, people like Kevin Cummins photographed and documented it, the bands soundtracked it, and we tried to paint it."

== History ==
In 1990, Central Station members Pat Carroll, Karen Jackson, and Matt Carroll appeared in the documentary TV series Celebration: Madchester — Sound of the North produced by Granada Television.

In 2008, Central Station's cover design for the Happy Mondays' 1988 album Bummed was featured in Turner Prize-winning artist Jeremy Deller's installation piece Shaun Ryder's Family Tree, shown at the Museum of Art, Rhode Island School of Design. "With its close-cropped, acid-pink portrait of Shaun Ryder, designed by Central Station, Deller displays the album alongside a vinyl-text genealogy of Ryder’s family, designed by Scott King."

== Exhibitions ==
In 1990, Central Station held their first exhibition, entitled Hello Playmates, at Manchester City Art Gallery from 29 July to 9 September. The exhibition featured "a collection of larger-than-life portraits of famous faces from British TV including Ken Dodd, Kenneth Williams, Bob Monkhouse and Barbara Windsor" as well as Arthur Askey (whose catchphrase was "Hello playmates!"), Tommy Cooper, and Tony Hancock. British music magazine NME reported on the opening night of the exhibition, describing it as "cheap pop graphics masquerading as fine art—or what?" and hailing Central Station as "awfully cool chaps" and "the design company responsible for the odd Happy Mondays record sleeve (the odder the better)." The opening was attended by such musicians as Reni of The Stone Roses, Graham Massey of 808 State, Graham Lambert of Inspiral Carpets, Bernard Sumner of New Order, Northside, Neil Tennant of Pet Shop Boys, and Johnny Marr of The Smiths. Later that year, the exhibition was transferred to London's Decorative Arts Group, then located at 9 Church St, NW8, where it was shown from 20 November to 1 December 1990.

Central Station had their first large-scale retrospective exhibition, called Faç Off, at Richard Goodall Gallery in Manchester, England in July 2008. It was a 25-year retrospective and encompassed work from throughout their career, offering for the first time the chance to buy silkscreen and pigment prints in signed and numbered editions of their works including the Faç Off and Madchester designs. It featured artwork from their Factory Records days, various fine art paintings and portraits of TV and radio personalities like Tommy Cooper, Ken Dodd, and Kenneth Williams.

In 2010, Central Station Design collaborated with ITV to celebrate the 50th anniversary of TV series Coronation Street, producing "a series of technicolour portraits of the soap's most famous stars." The prints were displayed at the Richard Goodall Gallery in Manchester in an exhibition entitled Central Station Paint Coronation Street Part 1 which ran from Friday 3 December 2011 to 15 January 2011.

== Title Sequences and Film Work ==
Operating under the names Central Station Art and Central Station Technicolour, the trio has designed numerous title sequences and graphics for feature films.

In 2002, they created the opening title sequence for the film 24 Hour Party People, a British comedy-drama directed by Michael Winterbottom about Manchester's popular music community from 1976 to 1992, and specifically about Factory Records. Along with the main titles, Central Station created the film's poster and its interstitial graphics, imbuing each piece with their signature "manic energy and bold swaths of colour." Central Station would go on to collaborate with Winterbottom on several more films, including The Killer Inside Me (2010) and The Look of Love (2013), for which they also designed title sequences. Talking with Art of the Title about their work on The Killer Inside Me, Karen Jackson said, "We tried to create our own contemporary take on ’50s title sequences." Sam Carroll describes their title sequence for The Look of Love as "an opening 3 minute film-within-a-film and various montages that would bring this eccentric, wild and colourful world to life."

In 2006, they worked with Director Antonia Bird to create the opening title sequence for the two-hour Cracker TV special.

== Filmography ==
- The Emperor's New Clothes (2015)
- The Look of Love (2013)
- The Killer Inside Me (2010)
- A Summer in Genoa (2008)
- A Mighty Hearty (2007)
- The Road to Guantanamo (2006)
- Cracker (2006)
- 9 Songs (2004)
- In This World (2002)
- 24 Hour Party People (2002)

== Personal life ==
The Carrolls are cousins of Shaun and Paul Ryder of the Happy Mondays.
