= Amateur Night in the Big Top =

Studio album by Shaun Ryder
- Released: 7 July 2003
- Recorded: April 2001 – July 2002
- Studios: Pete Carroll's garage, Australia; Spin, Sydney, Australia
- Genres: Dub, trip hop
- Length: 60:02
- Label: OffWorld Sounds
- Producers: Shane Norton, Stephen Mallinder

Shaun Ryder chronology
Amateur Night in the Big Top (2003)	Visits from Future Technology (2021)

Amateur Night in the Big Top is the debut studio album by British singer Shaun Ryder, the former frontman of Happy Mondays and Black Grape. The album is subtitled "Clowns and Pet Sounds". It was released in September 2003 and co-produced by Pete Carroll, Shane Norton and Cabaret Voltaire's Stephen Mallinder. It was recorded in Perth, Australia and released on the OffWorld Sounds record label run by Ryder's Carroll and Mallinder.

== Background and recording ==
In July 1998, vocalist Shaun Ryder said he would no longer be performing or recording with his band Black Grape. By the end of the year, MTV reported that Ryder might be reuniting his other band Happy Mondays. A reunion was confirmed in January 1999, with initially performance occurring in April 1999. In June 1999, MTV reported that the band were in the process of writing material for a new album. As Happy Mondays' reunion continued beyond its intended six-month plan, Ryder started consumed a considerable amount of alcohol and took cocaine. Touring continued into early 2001, and while in Australia for the Big Day Out festival, Ryder decided that he had enough of the band. He stayed in Perth, in the home of his cousin, Pete Carroll. Ryder thought the quiet location would be a good opportunity to go cold turkey from his previous heroin addiction.

Despite not wanting to make any music while in the country, Carroll thought it would be something to distract Ryder with. In April 2001, it was reported that Ryder had started recording an album; sessions continued into July 2002. Carroll served as the executive producer on the project. Shane Norton of Kuling Bros produced and engineered the material at Spin Studios in Sydney, Australia; former Cabaret Voltaire member Stephen Mallinder acted as co-producer on "Scooter Girl", "Clowns" and "Murder". Ryder recorded his vocals in Carroll's makeshift studio in his garage, which were recorded by Carroll and Norton. Adam McElnea mastered the album at Sonamax in Balmain, New South Wales.

Ryder heard tracks Carroll and Shane Norton were working on for Offworld Sounds. "Our Pete just said, 'Tell us a story.' I've got that many, Pete reckoned I should record them once and for all" said Shaun Ryder. "I'm kind of a novelist in the way that 9/11 was a Great American Novel" the singer added.

== Composition and lyrics ==
AllMusic reviewer Stephen Thomas Erlewine wrote that the music "sometimes arriv[es] at bracingly atmospheric beats equal parts dub and trip-hop". The Age writer Andrew Drever said Ryder's "meandering, stream-of-consciousness stories and loose scatting is set to the tough, dubby, electronic instrumentals" provided by Mallinder and Noron. In his autobiography Twisting My Melon: The Autobiography (2011), Ryder recounted that "because I was going cold turkey I was coming down and sweating all the time [...] not in a great place mentally", resulting in the stream-of-consciousness lyrics.

The album's opening track, "The Story", is an Eastern-inspired psychedelic track about excessive drug use and a planet flight. "Long Legs (Parts 1 2 3)" sees Ryder rap about his financial situation; Dever said Ryder "gloriously diffus[es] his pent-up anger with some true soul and blue-eyed tunefulness". "Scooter Girl" evoked the sound of Happy Mondays with its upbeat horn section and the Madchester groove. "Clowns" combines echo chamber-enhanced horns with dub music; Ryder said it was about his Black Grape bandmate Paul "Wags" Wagstaff's fear of clowns. "In 1987" sees Ryder recount his first experience taking ecstasy.

== Release and reception ==
Professional ratings
Aggregate scores
Source	Rating
Metacritic	51/100
Review scores
Source	Rating
AllMusic	3/5 stars
The Age	3/5 stars
Dotmusic	2/5 stars
The Guardian	1/5 stars
Now	1/5 stars

Ryder made his debut performance as a solo artist at V Festival in August 2002. On 27 May 2003, Ryder's debut solo album was announced for release later that year under the moniker Clowns and Pet Sounds. "Scooter Girl" was released as the lead single from it on 16 June 2003, with remixes of "Clowns" and "Scooter Girl" was the B-sides. Amateur Night in the Big Top was released through Offworld Sounds on 7 July 2003; it was released in Japan in May 2004 with remixes of "Whizz Wheels" and "Giving Out Loans to Perfect People with Brittle Bones" as bonus tracks. It was reissued in 2012 with new artwork and the Japanese bonus tracks through dPulse Recordings.

Amateur Night in the Big Top was met with mixed reviews from music critics. At Metacritic, the album received an average score of 51, based on ten reviews. Erlewine found Ryder's "inspired, mad verse takes second billing to the echoing club beats of it all". Unlike his earlier material, Ryder "rides the beat, never once propelling it with his exquisite bad taste and absurd pan-cultural irreverence". Drever said Ryder was "mostly as incomprehensible as ever, but the cheeky mischief and surreal sense of humour [...] is still intact". In a review for The Guardian, writer Alexis Petridis said Ryder mumbles "incoherently over tepid dance beats", while the music was "tuneless, [and] that's the least of its problems". He goes on call Ryder himself the biggest issue, as he "clearly has no idea how pitiful he sounds relating ancient tales of chemical derring-do".

In his book Happy Mondays – Excess All Areas: A Biography (2014), author Simon Spence called it "astonishingly warped, musically minimal, and brilliant". Matt Galloway of Now wrote that several years removed from the height of fame, Ryder "doesn’t seem to have anything else to say", adding that the "most profound moments are the curse words". Dotmusic's Dan Gennoe said on tracks such as "Long Legs (Parts 1 2 3)" and "Clowns", Ryder was "dribbling old soak talking to himself on a park bench [...] – barely conscious, never mind coherent".

NME said "It's genius. His talent is akin to Eminem. He's a great chronicler of down and dirty street life". Uncut said "It's terrifying, exhilarating stuff, just like 9/11. Another wildly implausible Ryder comeback. Just when we needed one. Embrace his soul vision".

== Track listing ==
Tracks 1–3 and 6–8 by Shane Norton, Pete Carroll and Ryder. Tracks 3 and 4 by Norton, Carroll, Ryder and Stephen Mallinder.

1. "The Story" – 7:14
2. "Long Legs (Parts 1 2 3)" – 9:09
3. "Scooter Girl" – 6:52
4. "Clowns" – 8:37
5. "Murder" – 5:43
6. "Northern Soul Brother (Shapeshifter)" – 7:19
7. "Monster" – 7:14
8. "In 1987" – 7:54

== Personnel ==
Personnel per booklet.

Musicians

- Shaun Ryder – vocals
- Kiriakos Lucas – guitar, bouzouki
- Lucky Oceans – pedal steel, accordion
- Chad Hedley – additional percussion

Production and design

- Pete Carroll – executive producer, album concept, project coordinator, recording, layout
- Shane Norton – producer, engineer, recording
- Stephen Mallinder – co-producer (tracks 3, 4 and 5)
- Matt Carroll – art
- Nat Brunovs – layout
- Adam McElnea – mastering
