= Judge Fudge =

Judge Fudge may refer to:

- Judge Fudge (song), a 1991 song by the English rock band Happy Mondays
- Judge Fudge (Drawn Together), a character from the animation series Drawn Together
