= Bummed =

Studio album by Happy Mondays
- Released: 21 November 1988
- Recorded: August 1988
- Studios: The Slaughterhouse, Driffield; Strawberry, Stockport
- Genres: Madchester; psychedelic funk
- Length: 37:27
- Label: Factory
- Producer: Martin Hannett

Happy Mondays chronology
Squirrel and G-Man Twenty Four Hour Party People Plastic Face Carnt Smile (White Out) (1987)	Bummed (1988)	Madchester Rave On (1989)

Singles from Bummed
- 1. "Wrote for Luck" Released: 31 October 1988; 2. "Lazyitis – One Armed Boxer" Released: 6 May 1989

Bummed is the second studio album by English rock band Happy Mondays, released on 21 November 1988 on Factory Records. During 1987 and early 1988, the band discovered house music and the rave drug ecstasy. Factory producer Martin Hannett was subsequently enlisted to produce the band's next album. Sessions were held at The Slaughterhouse recording studio in Driffield over three weeks. Hannett moved recording to Strawberry Studios, where extra instrumentation was added. Bummed is a Madchester-style psychedelic funk album, where much of the lyrical content was influenced by the 1970 film Performance, with dialogue from the film sampled throughout.

Happy Mondays toured the United Kingdom supporting James in late 1988, which coincided with the release of the lead single from Bummed, "Wrote for Luck", on 31 October 1988. Happy Mondays played a series of headlining shows to close out the year; stints in mainland Europe and the UK followed in the first half of 1989. "Lazyitis – One Armed Boxer", an alternative version of the closing track "Lazy Itis", was released as the second single from the album on 6 May 1989. Following this, the band embarked on a North American tour, supporting labelmates Pixies. At the suggestion of their manager, remixes of "Wrote for Luck" – retitled "W.F.L." – were made by Paul Oakenfold and Vince Clarke of Erasure. These versions were released together as part of a reissued "W.F.L." single in September 1989.

Bummed received generally positive reviews from music critics, many of whom praised Hannett's production work. It peaked at number 59 on the UK Albums Chart, though it was initially seen as a disappointing seller by Factory Records. The original version of "Wrote for Luck" reached number seven on the UK Independent Singles Chart. "Lazyitis – One Armed Boxer" charted at number 46 on the UK Singles Chart, followed by the remixed "W.F.L." at number 68. Bummed appeared on album of the year and best of decade lists by NME, Sounds, and Q. "Wrote for Luck" and Bummed have been viewed as defining releases of the acid house era and the Second Summer of Love.

== Background ==
Happy Mondays released their debut studio album, Squirrel and G-Man Twenty Four Hour Party People Plastic Face Carnt Smile (White Out), in April 1987 through Factory Records. The album had to be reissued due to the track "Desmond" sharing the same melody with "Ob-La-Di, Ob-La-Da" (1968) by the Beatles. They were threatened with legal action over this; it was replaced on subsequent copies with the hastily recorded "24 Hour Party People". During the session for it, the band also worked on several new tracks for their next album. The lead single from Squirrel and G-Man Twenty Four Hour Party People Plastic Face Carnt Smile (White Out), "Tart Tart", earned Happy Mondays national exposure for the first time when its music video was played on Channel 4's The Chart Show.

In the first half of 1987 (between recording and the release of their debut), Factory A&R member and DJ Mike Pickering was introducing house music at the label's Haçienda club. The members of Happy Mondays would visit the venue to immerse themselves in Pickering's selections. It would prove to have an influence on the members, as it served as a bridge between the music they heard in their heads and what they wrote. The band at this point did not fit into any particular music scene; grebo was establishing itself, a new wave of gothic rock was being ushered in, and American indie bands were rising to prominence. In October 1987, the band embarked on their first headlining tour of the United Kingdom, which saw the debut of new songs "Fat Lady Wrestlers" and "Moving in With".

Shortly before Christmas 1987, Happy Mondays dancer Bez was introduced to the rave drug ecstasy and quickly introduced it to the other members. Frontman Shaun Ryder grew tired of their manager, Phil Saxe, wanting someone who was more in tune with the scene at the Haçienda. In early 1988, Saxe left his role, citing that he could not devote enough time to it. He was replaced by Nathan McGough, who took on the role full-time at his suggestion. McGough had been a member of Factory band The Royal Family and the Poor and previously managed Factory act Kalima. McGough's first measure was getting the band legally signed to Factory, who had no formal contracts with their artists up to that point. Around this time, the members had a lucrative business selling ecstasy; through various people, they had accumulated 15,000 pills of the drug.

== Recording and production ==
=== Demos ===
McGough organised Happy Mondays to record demos of their new material at Out of the Blue Studios in Ancoats. Factory became aware that the band were known around London as being a difficult act to record with, not helped by the poor reception to the production of their debut album. Ryder was impressed with the self-produced material at Out of the Blue and asked if they could self-produce their next album, only to be told that they needed a known, popular producer. Factory director Alan Erasmus suggested Martin Hannett; he worked with the label in their early years and split following the construction of the Haçienda, which he was opposed to.

McGough liked the idea of having Hannett, as did Ryder, who learned of him through New Order frontman Bernard Sumner and his work on Unknown Pleasures (1979) by Joy Division. Factory Records co-founder Tony Wilson was hesitant about the idea before realising it would work well for both Hannett and the band. Hannett had been struggling financially at the time, stemming from a prior lawsuit with Factory. Bassist Paul Ryder and drummer Gary Whelan drove to pick Hannett up from Chorlton to take him to the studio. Happy Mondays and Hannett decamped to Strawberry Studios in Stockport with the intent to record demos; however, Hannett and the members instead spent session time in separate pubs. They ended up only recording an early version of "Wrote for Luck".

=== Main sessions ===
Bummed was recorded in August 1988 at The Slaughterhouse in Driffield with engineers Colin Richardson and John Spence. It was a residential studio with a state-of-the-art 36-track recording console. The location was picked as it was a large distance from the Haçienda, in an attempt to cut Happy Mondays from their ecstasy supply. Upon arriving, they found that the living quarters had no food and the rooms were astray. They instead lived in a terrace house that previously contained the studio. Hannett stayed at another house in the nearby town, which allowed for visits from his family. Within two days of visiting a local pub, the band became aware of a nearby army base, where they befriended various personnel. The band started selling the servicemen ecstasy; rave culture subsequently broke out at the pub, which caught the attention of the local press.

Describing the drug's impact on the recording, McGough recalled that the members of the band were consuming it daily and added they brought 200 pills of it with them, "but they ran out after ten days so I had to go back to Manchester and collect another hundred. Bummed is definitely an E album, perhaps the first full album ever made on that drug." Bez was arrested while in Manchester for stealing a car and possessing marijuana. He also had 500 ecstasy pills, but the police were not aware of what they were at the time; he had to sit out of the remainder of the sessions. Ryder also noted the influence of LSD on the sessions. The band provided the alcoholic Hannett with large amounts of ecstasy to keep him from drinking during the recording.

Hannett would have the band perform the songs over and over for several hours at a time and, as such, would record the majority of the album live. Due to his previous experience as a bass player, Hannett spent time alone with Paul Ryder working on a specific sound. Hannett ran the instrument through a multitude of digital filters, time modulation, and effects pedals. In addition to using his own guitar on the album, guitarist Mark Day used one of Hannett's. Aware of Hannett's financial issues, Shaun Ryder bought the guitar from him for £300. On one occasion, Wilson visited the band during the sessions. Upon entering the studio, he found it dark and filled with smoke, as the floor was completely covered in house records.

Wilson brought with him a film crew to shoot part of the sessions for a TV programme he was involved in about working environments. As the band returned to Manchester, Hannett continued experimenting with the master tapes at Strawberry Studios with engineer John Pennington. He brought in additional musicians to enhance the tracks: percussion from drum teacher Dave Hassell, piano from his friend Steve Hopkins, and banjo from Derek "Horseman" Ryder (father of Shaun and Paul Ryder). Hannett saturated the recordings with effects such as reverb and echo. The sessions lasted for three weeks in total, costing £50,000; the final recordings were mixed at Strawberry Studios in September 1988.

== Composition and lyrics ==
=== Overview ===
Musically, the sound of Bummed has been described as Madchester and psychedelic funk. Author Dave Thompson, in his book Alternative Rock (2000), said it sounded like the "missing link between post-punk and the burgeoning baggy scene"; he compared Ryder's vocals to that of Fall frontman Mark E. Smith, recommended that Day should audition for Siouxsie and the Banshees, and suggested Bez and Whelan "send their résumés to Adam Ant". Ryder said it had a fuller sound when compared to Squirrel and G-Man Twenty Four Hour Party People Plastic Face Carnt Smile (White Out), building off the progression from "24 Hour Party People". Referring to the origin of the album's name, Whelan recalled that "'Bummed', was a saying at the time. Shaun used to say he was out all night and he bummed her all night long, a slang word for sex. I didn't even know what the album was called until it came out." Ryder said he used the term for the album intentionally to be "offensive and we thought loads of people would take it the wrong way".

In his biography of the band, Shaun Ryder: Happy Mondays, Black Grape & Other Traumas, author Mick Middles said the public overlooked its intent, theorising that it could be used in varying contexts: "from the more obvious cadging (e.g. he bummed a fag from his mate) to scrounging a room for the night (e.g. he bummed a carpet)". The 1970 film Performance became a big influence on the band, with Ryder directly lifting lines of dialogue for lyrics or being inspired by some of the scenes in it. He would mix in slang words he had heard while shifting ecstasy. Ryder was expected to have finished writing the lyrics to the songs in the months prior to recording; by the time recording was nearly done, he had lyrics for less than half of the album. It prompted him to finish the other half in the final few days of the sessions.

=== Songs ===
"Country Song", the opening track on Bummed, was originally known as "Some Cunt from Preston", acting as rhyming slang for country and western. John Wilde of Melody Maker described it as "the world's first psycho-reggae-country-western number". It was written before the band had figured out their sound; while rehearsing at The Boardwalk, they came up with what Ryder called the "Salford version of a country song". Its title changed from "Some Cunt from Preston" to "Redneck" before ending up at "Country Song". "Moving in With" is about the place Ryder lived while in Boothstown, Salford. An earlier version of it was recorded during the same session as "24 Hour Party People". With the song, Paul Ryder attempted to emulate the bass part in "This Must Be the Place (Naive Melody)" (1983) by Talking Heads. Whelan's drum part was inspired by the one in "Running Up That Hill" (1985) by Kate Bush. Shaun Ryder's lyrics were influenced by the folk tale Henny Penny and namecheck several of its characters.

"Mad Cyril" is named after a character from Performance and includes a sample of a different character from the same film, Harry Flowers. The song's lyrics describe a gangster having a trip. "Fat Lady Wrestlers" is representative of the lifestyle the band had at the time, as Ryder explained: "We were very much living like crazy hustlers". "Performance" is written from the perspective of Chas, another character from the film of the same name. Similar to "Moving in With", it also references Ryder's place in Boothstown, where they would stash valuable items such as drugs or clothes. "Brain Dead" opens with Ryder quoting a line from the film Gimme Shelter (1970): "You're rendering that scaffolding dangerous!"

With "Wrote for Luck", the band tried to write a song that could be played at the Haçienda. Paul Ryder unsuccessfully tried to play sequenced basslines, which he heard in the Chicago house music that Pickering was playing at the club, on his bass guitar. Keyboardist Paul Davis tried to play the synth part from "Two Tribes" (1984) by Frankie Goes to Hollywood, while Whelan had a go at emulating "Running Up That Hill" again. Day later contributed his guitar part, while Shaun Ryder added the song's hook, "Higher than high high", based on his mental state at the time. It marked the first time Ryder attempted to write a song about the same topic, namely a heroin drug deal gone wrong. One of its lines is dialogue directly taken from the 1974 film Stardust.

Ryder said "Bring a Friend" is the closest track to a love song on the album, with many of its lines taken from a pornographic magazine he had read while in Amsterdam. "Do It Better" was initially called "E"; it is centred around a guitar part and Ryder ad-libbing around the phrase "on one", which referred to being high on ecstasy. The album's closing track, "Lazy Itis", has Can-esque drumming patterns and borrows a lyric from "Ticket to Ride" (1965) by the Beatles, resulting in a writing credit between Happy Mondays and Lennon–McCartney. Its title phrase was a word the Ryders' grandmother used to say. For the single version of the track, Ryder decided to include lyrics from "Gonna Make You a Star" (1974) by David Essex.

== Release ==
Bummed was released on 21 November 1988 through Factory Records. The cover art shows an image of Ryder's face painted over in garish colours, which Central Station Design did as part of a series of celebrity shots done in the same way. Iain Ellis of PopMatters said Ryder's "cropped face [is] a disturbing caricature of drug-afflicted vacancy", which has "become an emblem of the times, the carnival decadence of an era encapsulated in pictorial form." Matthew Robertson, in his book Factory Records: The Complete Graphic Album (2006), added to this, saying that the "viewer cannot help but be caught by the haunting, mesmerizing, enormity" of the artwork. The album's inner sleeve featured two images of a naked woman, both of which were taken from the Readers' Wives section of an issue of Penthouse. Robertson said this was done "for humour's sake rather than shock value"; Wilson dubbed it "one of the most profoundly disturbing inner sleeves in record history". As a result of this imagery, retailers refused to stock the album; its Japanese release was delayed due to the image, resulting in copies being confiscated at customs. In addition, it received a negative reaction from journalists, such as Penny Anderson of City Life and Mandi James of NME, the latter of whom called the band "sexist wankers" for the decision.

Concerned about people stealing promotional posters, as they had done previously for New Order gig posters, Factory Records decided to purchase a building and have it plastered with posters of the album's artwork. Located on Charles Street, it was noticed by various workers traveling in the southern part of Manchester. Middles said the landmark could be viewed as the first "identifiable symbol of Manchester dance culture" and Madchester as a whole. In early 1989, the band signed a publishing deal with FFRR Music; around this time, the band signed a contract with American label Elektra Records. The latter was impressed by the "Wrote for Luck" video and Wilson's sales pitch. Factory also had smaller deals with labels in Europe, such as Rough Trade Records in Germany. By July 1989, Bummed was released in North America as "Wrote for Luck" was gaining traction at radio stations.

=== Singles ===
"Wrote for Luck" was released as the lead single from Happy Mondays' forthcoming album; author Simon Spence in his book Happy Mondays – Excess All Areas: A Biography (2014) listed the release date as 31 October 1988, while a contemporary issue of Music Week gave the date of 28 November 1988. "Boom" and three remixes (dance, radio, and club mixes) of "Wrote for Luck" were included as its B-sides. Robertson wrote that the sleeve's "hand-drawn lettering was an intentional move away from designers relying on type specimen books", as with previous Factory Records releases. The music video for "Wrote for Luck" was filmed by The Bailey Brothers in the middle of the October 1988 tour. They decided to shoot the band enjoying a night out at the Legend club in Manchester, which was a rival to the Haçienda. They hired the venue for the shoot, which featured their friends and crew members as extras. Concerned that the video was not going to receive airplay on The Chart Show, a second video was filmed during the afternoon with a younger crowd. It starred children from a local drama group who spent a week rehearsing acid house-style dancing. As none of them liked "Wrote for Luck", The Bailey Brothers put on music by Pepsi & Shirlie and Wham! in order for them to start dancing.

"Lazy Itis" was released as the second single from the album; a contemporary issue of Music Week listed the date of 24 April 1989, while Spence gave a release date of 6 May 1989. Robertson said the artwork was a "bright arrangement [of colours] that is also bloated and sluggish and is delivered in a hallucinogenic daze", while its title is "incorporated into a three-dimensional typographic sculpture through which runs a river of ink". The single iteration is dubbed "Lazyitis – One Armed Boxer"; its B-side is a remix of "Mad Cyril". The former is a duet between Ryder and yodeller Karl Denver, which was intended as a theme song for an unrealised film by The Bailey Brothers. The song's music video was filmed a month prior at the Mancunian Way flyover with the band and Denver. It stars the band in Strangeways prison attire, playing football, while their friend Big Les walks around them with a dog. The Bailey Brothers wanted to include rain in it, so they hired a rain machine. Filming concluded when Denver was unable to continue mouthing the words due to his teeth chattering from the cold.

In an attempt to boost the album's reach in the UK, McGough suggested making a house remix for one of its tracks. He was put in contact with Pete Tong at FFRR, who connected McGough with Paul Oakenfold. Bez had previously spent the last six months convincing the band to work with him, and Ryder had been playing "Jibaro" (1988) by Oakenfold's band Electra frequently during the making of Bummed. McGough quizzed the members on who else they wanted as a remixer, with Paul Ryder suggesting Vince Clarke of Erasure. Oakenfold played white label copies of his remix at various clubs, all to positive reception from the crowds. Reissued on 18 September 1989, "Wrote for Luck" – now retitled "W.F.L." – included Clarke and Oakenfold remixes of the title track, with "Lazyitis – One Armed Boxer" as its B-side. Robertson said that the artwork for this version adapts the original "Wrote for Luck" cover as it "becomes the backdrop for what appears to be a fish tank", with species of fish swimming in front of it. He added that this contributes a "playful dimension to their pre-existing aesthetic".

=== Reissues and related releases ===
Bummed was reissued in 2007 as part of a two-CD set through Rhino Records, which included B-sides, the Madchester Rave On (1989) EP, and a variety of remixes. It was included in Rhino Records' Original Album Series box set in 2013, which collected Happy Mondays' first four studio albums. That same year, the band performed the album in its entirety to celebrate its 25th anniversary in 2013. The album was re-pressed on vinyl in 2020 alongside their first, third, and fourth albums.

"Wrote for Luck", "Lazy Itis", and remixes of "Wrote for Luck" and "Mad Cyril" appeared on Happy Mondays' first compilation album, Double Easy – The U.S. Singles (1993). "Mad Cyril", "Lazy Itis", and a remix of "Wrote for Luck" were included on their second and fourth compilation albums, Loads (1995) and The Platinum Collection (2005). "Mad Cyril" and remixes of "Wrote for Luck" and "Lazy Itis" appeared on the band's third compilation album, Greatest Hits (1999). Remixes of "Wrote for Luck" and "Lazy Itis" were included on the band's fifth compilation album, Double Double Good: The Best of Happy Mondays (2012).

== Touring and live performances ==
In October 1988, Happy Mondays supported James on their tour of the UK. Following this, the band played four headlining shows across November and December 1988, closing the year with a support slot for New Order at the G-Mex Centre. Happy Mondays played "Performance" and "Do It Better", both of which Ryder picked, for Wilson's TV programme The Other Side of Midnight. A launch party for the album was held on 28 November 1989 at the Heaven club in London. Preceded by two UK shows, Happy Mondays embarked on a stint in mainland Europe in January and February 1989. As the band had run out of money by the tour's end, a few shows were quickly arranged afterwards so that they had enough funds to return home. A London show soon followed, where the members met Elektra A&R representative Howard Thompson. On 21 February 1989, the band did a Peel session, where they played "Mad Cyril" and "Do It Better".

Following this, Happy Mondays went on a UK tour until mid-March 1989. They supported the Shamen for two dates in Ireland before supporting My Bloody Valentine for three shows in France. Prior to the Ireland shows, Bez was arrested by his father, who was a cop, for violating his bail conditions set during the making of Bummed. Bez's role was filled in by Andrew McKean, who previously worked with Saxe; Bez returned for the My Bloody Valentine shows. Happy Mondays played three UK shows in May 1989. Ryder and Bez flew to New York City, spending two days there drumming up publicity for a forthcoming tour. Happy Mondays appeared on the final episode of The Other Side of Midnight, where they performed "Mad Cyril" (changing the lyrics to reference Wilson) and "Wrote for Luck". In July and August 1989, the band toured across Canada and the US, supporting labelmates Pixies.

== Critical reception ==
Professional ratings
Review scores
Source	Rating
AllMusic	4.5/5 stars
Chicago Tribune	3/4 stars
The Guardian	5/5 stars
Mojo	5/5 stars
NME	9/10
Q	3/5 stars
Record Mirror	4/5
The Rolling Stone Album Guide	2/5 stars
Stylus Magazine	7.9/10
Uncut	5/5 stars

Bummed was met with generally positive reviews from music critics. NME writer James Brown lauded the album's "shocking originality" and found that its sound would "fit startlingly amidst the rapid mutation of the current underground dance boom." Q's Martin Aston said it "continues the band's warped version of Northern Soul rhythms, with stabbing guitars and Hammond organs, wayward sequencers, a dislocated rhythm section and surly sardonic vocalist ... [The] only real failing is its lack of versatility, but it's Happy Mondays' stroppy spirit that counts most of all." Tony Beard of Record Mirror noted the band's musical development, writing that "the sound they slip into is a world away from the cack-handed northern funk they used to bash out." Chicago Tribune journalist Greg Kot complimented Hannett's production, calling it "one excellent reason" for listeners to buy the album.

Reviewing Bummed in retrospect for AllMusic, Stephen Thomas Erlewine praised Hannett's production as "all smeared colors and harsh edges," and wrote that "decadence has rarely sounded as dangerous as it did in the hands of the Mondays and this is where they reveled in that debauchery, pumping out stiff psychedelic funk as Ryder spat out rhymes of luck, lazyitis and fat lady wrestlers." Writing for The Guardian, Alexis Petridis said, "[a]lmost 20 years on, Bummed sounds extraordinary, but wildly abstruse". He expanded on this, calling it the "result of the copious intake of ecstasy". Priya Elan of NME felt the album "actually dated best" out of all of the band's releases, despite Hannett's "raw production show[ing] the Madchester sound in its infancy". BBC Music reviewer Daryl Easlea wrote that it had a "heart and spirit that beats away", stopping the "album from [the brink of] collapse." Mojo's Danny Eccleston credited Happy Mondays with creating "a new kind of psychedelic punk-funk" on Bummed.

== Commercial performance and accolades ==
Bummed peaked at number 2 on the UK Independent Albums Chart. In January 1990 it peaked at number 59 on the main UK Albums Chart. Factory saw the album's initial sales as highly disappointing, though they were not concerned due to a large cash flow injection from the sales of New Order's Substance (1987) a year prior. By early 1989, it had sold 15,000 copies. Due to the success of the remixed "W.F.L.", the album's sales reached the threshold for gold certification in the UK. "Lazyitis – One Armed Boxer" charted at number 46 on the main UK Singles Chart and number six on the UK Independent Singles Chart. The original version of "Wrote for Luck" peaked at number seven on the UK Independent Singles Chart. The remixed "W.F.L." peaked at number 68 on the main UK Singles Chart and number three on the UK Independent Singles Chart.

Spence said "Wrote for Luck" became the defining track of the acid house era. Scott Plagenhoef of Stylus Magazine considered Bummed the "perfect summation of the 1988 British Summer of Love". It was included in the 2006 edition of 1001 Albums You Must Hear Before You Die. In a piece for NME, journalist Mark Beaumont viewed the album as one of ten important releases that defined Factory Records' output. Manic Street Preachers covered "Wrote for Luck" as a B-side to their single "Roses in the Hospital" (1993), while the Panics covered "Lazy Itis" for Cruel Guards (2007).

== Track listing ==
All songs written by Happy Mondays, except "Lazy Itis" by Happy Mondays and Lennon–McCartney.

Side one

1. "Country Song" – 3:24
2. "Moving in With" – 3:36
3. "Mad Cyril" – 4:36
4. "Fat Lady Wrestlers" – 3:25
5. "Performance" – 4:09

Side two

6. "Brain Dead" – 3:10
7. "Wrote for Luck" – 6:05
8. "Bring a Friend" – 3:45
9. "Do It Better" – 2:29
10. "Lazy Itis" – 2:48

== Personnel ==
Personnel per sleeve.

Happy Mondays

- Shaun Ryder
- Paul Ryder
- Mark Day
- Paul Davis
- Gary Whelan
- Mark "Bez" Berry

Additional musicians

- Dave Hassell – percussion
- Steve Hopkins – piano
- Derek "Horseman" Ryder – banjo

Production and design

- Martin Hannett – producer
- Colin Richardson – engineer
- John Spence – engineer
- Laurence Diana – engineer
- Central Station Design – artwork

== Charts ==
Chart performance for Bummed
Chart (1989–1990)	Peak position
UK Independent Albums Charts	2
UK Albums (Official Charts)	59
