= Tart Tart =

Single by Happy Mondays

from the album Squirrel and G-Man Twenty Four Hour Party People Plastic Face Carnt Smile (White Out)
- B-side: "Little Matchstick Owen's Rap"
- Released: March 1987
- Studio: Fire House (London)
- Genre: Madchester
- Length: 4:18
- Label: Factory - FAC 176
- Songwriter(s): Happy Mondays
- Producer(s): John Cale

Happy Mondays singles chronology
"Freaky Dancing" (1986)	"Tart Tart" (1987)	"24 Party People" (1987)

"Tart Tart" is a 1987 single by the English rock band Happy Mondays. It was the first single to be released from their debut studio album Squirrel and G-Man Twenty Four Hour Party People Plastic Face Carnt Smile (White Out) in March 1987.

The B-side, "Little Matchstick Owen's Rap" was voiced by the audio engineer, Mike Bleach.

== Inspirations ==
According to a commentary accompanying the film 24 Hour Party People (2002), the first verse of "Tart Tart" is about Martin Hannett, who later produced the band's second studio album Bummed (1988). The second verse is explained in Bez's Freaky Dancin' (p. 198–200):

I had a special affinity for the tune because of the references to one of the very first people we had met in the early Haçienda days. Her name was Tart Tart. She was a strange type of woman, an old groupie from the 60s, something she wasn't adverse to admitting. (...) One weekend we'd called by as usual to pick up a bag of goodies, promising to pay up on the following Monday. (...) On returning with the dough a few days later, there was no reply at the door. We went back a few times over the next couple of days but again there was no response. Eventually, another friend of ours went round and forced the door. He found her dead at the bottom of the stairs. She'd died of a brain tumour an was black and blue from throwing herself around, smashing her head on the walls an ultimately down the stair in a desperate attempt to stop the pain an agony. (...) Her sudden and lonely death was a shock for the band as we'd all come to look upon her as a special an unusual friend.

== Track listing ==
=== 12" ===
1. "Tart Tart" – 4:18
2. "Little Matchstick Owen's Rap" – 4:15
