= Visits from Future Technology =

Studio album by Shaun Ryder
- Released: 20 August 2021
- Length: 41:37
- Label: SWRX
- Producer: Sunny Levine

Shaun Ryder chronology
| Amateur Night in the Big Top (2003) | Visits from Future Technology (2021) |

Professional ratings
Review scores
| Source | Rating |
|---|---|
| The Arts Desk | 4/5 stars |
| Louder Than War | 9/10 |
| Mojo | 4/5 stars |

Visits from Future Technology is the second studio album by British singer Shaun Ryder, the frontman of Happy Mondays and Black Grape. It was produced by Sunny Levine and released on 20 August 2021 by SWRX Recordings, Ryder's own label. "Mumbo Jumbo" was released as the first single from the album in June 2021.

== Track listing ==
1. "Mumbo Jumbo" (Shaun Ryder, Sunny Levine, Ariel Rosenberg) – 3:38
2. "Close the Dam" (Ryder, Levine, Amir Yaghmai) – 4:01
3. "Pop Star's Daughters" (Ryder, Levine, Rosenberg) – 3:52
4. "Monster" (Ryder, Levine, Eamond Ryland) – 4:30
5. "Honey Put the Kettle On" (Ryder, Levine, Giuseppe Patane) – 3:11
6. "Crazy Bitches" (Ryder, Levine, Yaghmai) – 3:12
7. "Straighten Me Up" (Ryder, Levine, Yaghmai) – 3:44
8. "I Can Stop Anytime" (Ryder, Levine) – 4:00
9. "Electric Scales" (Ryder, Levine, Patane) – 3:28
10. "Turn Off the Air" (Ryder, Levine, Rosenberg) – 3:02
11. "Clubbing Rabbits" (Ryder, Dan Broad, Gary Whelan) – 4:59

== Personnel ==
Personnel per sleeve.

- Shaun Ryder – lead vocals, background vocals
- Sunny Levine – riddim, synths, tings, background vocals
- Ariel Pink – guitar, bass, keyboards, background vocals, beatbox
- Amir Yaghmai – guitar, bass, plucked violin, synth
- Eamond Ryland – guitar, pedal steel, bass
- Joachim Cooder – percussion
- John Carroll Kirby – keyboards, synth bass, synths
- Julie Gordon – background vocals
- Giuseppe Patane – bass, guitar, synths
- Jesse Nolan – guitar
- Dan Broad – synths, guitar
- Norman Mcleod – pedal steel
