= Bez's Madchester Anthems: Sorted Tunes from Back in the Day =

Bez's Madchester Anthems: Sorted Tunes From Back In The Day!

Compilation album by various artists
- Released: 2006
- Recorded: Various Times
- Genre: Madchester
- Label: Warner Strategic Marketing
- Compiler: Bez

Bez's Madchester Anthems: Sorted Tunes From Back In The Day! is mainly a Madchester compilation album, compiled by Bez (known from the bands Happy Mondays and Black Grape) and released in 2006.

== Track listing ==
=== Disc one ===
1. "Step On" - Happy Mondays
2. "The Only One I Know" - The Charlatans
3. "Come Home" - James
4. "Blue Monday ‘88” - New Order
5. “Sally Cinnamon" - The Stone Roses
6. "Groovy Train" - The Farm
7. "Move Any Mountain" - The Shamen
8. "Pacific State" - 808 State
9. "NRG" - Adamski
10. "Hello" - The Beloved
11. "Get The Message" - Electronic
12. "She's A Rainbow" - World Of Twist
13. "Perfume" (Loved Up)" - Paris Angels
14. "Shack Up" - A Certain Ratio
15. "Shall We Take A Trip" - Northside
16. "Only Rhyme That Bites" - MC Tunes & 808 State
17. "Abandon" - That Petrol Emotion
18. "Shine On” - The House of Love
19. "There She Goes" - The La's
20. "Panic" - The Smiths

=== Disc two ===
1. "She Bangs the Drums" - The Stone Roses
2. "Loaded" - Primal Scream
3. "Kinky Afro" - Happy Mondays
4. "This Is How It Feels" - Inspiral Carpets
5. "How Soon Is Now" - The Smiths
6. "Can You Dig It" - Mock Turtles
7. "Stepping Stone" - The Farm
8. "Fine Time" - New Order
9. "Hardcore Uproar" - Together
10. "Chime" - Orbital
11. "Papua New Guinea" - Future Sound of London
12. "What Can You Do For Me" - Utah Saints
13. "Strawberry Fields Forever" - Candy Flip
14. "Never Enough" - The Cure
15. "Only Love Can Break Your Heart" - Saint Etienne
16. "Voodoo Ray" - A Guy Called Gerald
17. "Sun Rising" - The Beloved
18. "One Dream" - Bez & Monica Ward
