= Richard Macer =

British documentary maker (born 1967)

- Born: May 1967 (age 58)
- Occupation: Documentary maker
- Spouse: Suzanne
- Children: 2
- Awards: RTS, Grierson
- Website: platformproductions.co.uk

Richard Macer (born May 1967) is a British documentary maker who has made over fifty films whose subjects include singer/songwriter Shaun Ryder, model Jordan, dyslexia, morris dancing, British Vogue magazine, department stores, and reincarnation. He has won both RTS Awards and a Grierson Award.

Born May 1967, Macer grew up in the Milton Keynes area. He attended Bow Brickhill Primary School, but after struggling with schoolwork due to learning difficulties, his parents made the decision to send him to a private school. Later he attended Stantonbury Campus School and at 18 left Milton Keynes to go to Nottingham Polytechnic.

He worked as a journalist and as a newsreader at Piccadilly Radio, then in a reporting job at ITV Granada. After a period with MTV he worked on various projects at BBC Manchester. In 2008 he founded Platform Productions, which is based in Manchester.

Macer is married to Suzanne and they have two children, Arthur and Harry. Arthur, who is dyslexic, was the subject of his father's 2018 documentary 'Farther and Sun: A Dyslexic Road Trip'. During the film, Macer himself was assessed for dyslexia but the tests were unable to confirm that he was dyslexic due to his acquired 'compensatory strategies'.

Macer directed The Trial of Michael Jackson with Adam Fielding as Jackson, which aired on Channel Five in 2026.
