= Paul Ryder =

English bassist (1964–2022)

- Born: Paul Anthony Ryder; 24 April 1964; Salford, Lancashire, England
- Died: 15 July 2022 (aged 58)
- Genres: Alternative rock; Madchester; electronica
- Occupation: Musician
- Instrument: Bass guitar
- Years active: 1980–2022
- Formerly of: Happy Mondays

Paul Anthony Ryder (24 April 1964 – 15 July 2022) was an English musician. He was a bass player and a founding member of the Manchester band Happy Mondays with his brother Shaun Ryder. His bass playing was credited with bringing funk to the band's mixture of indie rock, Northern soul and house music, and with underpinning the Madchester sound of the late 1980s.

== Early life ==
Paul and Shaun are the two sons of Derek Ryder, a postman, and his wife Linda, a nurse. Ryder was born in Salford to Linda (née Carroll) and Derek Ryder, a postal worker, and was brought up in the Salford suburb of Little Hulton.

Ryder received a bass guitar as a birthday present from his father, who was musical, and taught himself to play. At 13 he attended a Thin Lizzy concert in Manchester, catching a plectrum thrown into the audience by guitarist Scott Gorham. He said that seeing David Bowie on Top of the Pops at the age of eight had made him want to become a musician.

On leaving school in 1980 he worked for the Royal Mail. While on his round he posted a demo cassette through the door of New Order bassist Peter Hook, bringing the group to the attention of Tony Wilson and Factory Records; they went on to perform at Wilson's club, the Haçienda.

== Career ==
=== Happy Mondays ===
Ryder co-founded the group in 1980 with his brother Shaun, Gary Whelan and Mark Day; Paul Davis joined the following year. They played cover versions at youth clubs, initially without a name and later as Avant Garde and Penguin Dice, before adopting the name Happy Mondays in 1983. Both Ryder and Day claimed to have coined the name: Day said he took it from New Order's "Blue Monday", while Ryder said it referred to the day their unemployment benefit cheques arrived - "the day for getting off your face" as he once put it. His bandmates included his brother Shaun, Gary Whelan, Mark "Bez" Berry, Paul Davis and Mark Day; Rowetta had joined as a backing vocalist by the time of the band's biggest hit singles.

Ryder's bass featured on the band's biggest hits, "Kinky Afro" and "Step On" — the latter a cover of John Kongos's 1971 single "He's Gonna Step on You Again" — both of which reached No. 5 in the UK in 1990. "Kinky Afro" was also the group's most successful single in the United States. It was during his tenure with the band that it had its biggest successes with albums such as Pills 'n' Thrills and Bellyaches which sold more than 400,000 copies in the UK.

The Ryder brothers fell out in the 1990s as both brothers struggled with heroin addiction, and the group split in 1993. Ryder returned for a reunion between 1999 and 2001, during which the band had a hit with a cover of Thin Lizzy's "The Boys Are Back in Town" and supported Oasis at Wembley in 2000. He left in 2001 and moved to the United States, saying that being in a band with his brother was "not going to be conducive to sobriety" after he had stopped taking drugs; Happy Mondays reformed without him in 2004. He rejoined the band for their 2012 comeback, remaining a full-time member until his death in 2022.

In 2016, Happy Mondays received the Inspiration Award at the 61st Ivor Novello Awards, with Ryder named alongside Shaun Ryder, Mark Day, Paul Davis and Gary Whelan.

=== Musical style ===
Ryder's early influences were Motown, and particularly the bass playing of session musician James Jamerson on records by the Supremes, Stevie Wonder and Marvin Gaye, along with the Stranglers' Jean-Jacques Burnel. He said the grooves he played with Happy Mondays came out of Northern soul and disco, and that he could not read music, copying basslines by ear until, unable to reproduce them exactly, they became his own.

Writing in The Guardian after Ryder's death, the critic Alexis Petridis attributed the band's funk feel — unusual among British indie groups of the mid-1980s, whose influences were drawn largely from white rock — chiefly to Ryder's bass playing, and named Bootsy Collins and Jamerson as touchstones. In a group whose musicianship was sometimes questioned, Petridis wrote, Ryder's bass provided an anchor that the listener could hold on to amid the density of the band's sound.

On Bummed (1988), which Martin Hannett produced as a murky, echoing swirl, Ryder's bass remains audible throughout; Petridis cited the octave-leaping figure on "Moving In With" and the descending line on "Brain Dead". He considered "Hallelujah", from the Madchester Rave On EP and produced by Paul Oakenfold and Andrew Weatherall, to have cleared enough of that density to reveal how far Ryder's bass drove the band.

Ryder shared writing credits on several of the group's best-known songs. "Kinky Afro", credited to both Ryder brothers with Day, Davis and Whelan, began at a rehearsal: Ryder played a bassline in the feel of Hot Chocolate records he had been listening to, and Whelan built a drum pattern around it, with Day's guitar and Shaun's lyric added later during the Pills 'n' Thrills and Bellyaches sessions in Los Angeles. "Loose Fit" emerged from a jam between Ryder and Oakenfold.

He played a Fender Jazz Bass with flatwound strings. An earlier Jazz was sold during a period of heroin addiction and was later acquired by Johnny Marr. Ryder said he never learned to slap, and that a single pop on "Kinky Afro" was as far as he took it.

=== Acting ===
Ryder appeared in the films The Ghosts of Oxford Street, Losing It, and 24 Hour Party People, where he played the part of a gangster. He was portrayed in the latter film by Paul Popplewell.

=== Other projects ===
Ryder wrote music for several television shows, including Turn on Terry for ITV1, Baby's Birth Day for Granada TV and Forensics School for Discovery. He then formed a new band, Big Arm, for which he was also the lead vocalist, who released an album in 2007 titled Radiator and toured Britain that year in support of Ian Brown. According to Record Collector, the band's name came from a nickname Brown had given Ryder, referring to the pounding attack of his bass playing. Reviewing the album for that magazine, Mick Middles awarded it four stars, describing it as a coherent and consistent set of ten songs, largely self-financed and built outward from Ryder's basslines, on which Ryder appeared intent on recapturing the funk of the Happy Mondays without the chemical excess of that period.

He also played bass on Brown's 2007 album The World Is Yours, alongside Steve Jones and Paul Cook.

Ryder lived in Los Angeles where he continued to write music. He supported Tom Tom Club on two of the dates on the North America tour in October 2010, playing gigs in San Francisco and Los Angeles. He was joined by Eddy Gronfier, Neo Garcia on drums and Matt Cheadle on guitar.

=== The Paul Ryder Tapes ===
In the months leading up to his death, Ryder recorded a video podcast series, The Paul Ryder Tapes, with his ex-wife, the journalist and television producer Angela Smith, discussing his life, his relationship with his brother and the history of Happy Mondays. He completed recording 12 days before his death, and the series was released from July 2023, a year on.

Smith said Ryder had wanted to correct accounts of the band and his family that he considered inaccurate, and that the recordings were intended to form the basis of a book. Contributors to the series included his mother Linda, his bandmates Gary Whelan, Mark Day, Bez and Rowetta, and Peter Hook, Mani and Clint Boon. Smith said the podcast reached number one in the UK music podcast chart within days of release.

== Personal life and campaigning ==
Ryder's first marriage, to his childhood sweetheart Alison, ended in divorce in 1991. He later moved to Los Angeles, where he began a relationship with the British television producer Angela Smith. He had four children.

Ryder's son Chico was diagnosed with rhabdomyosarcoma, a rare soft-tissue cancer, in 2012 at the age of nine. Doctors judged surgery too risky and treated him with chemotherapy and radiotherapy. Ryder, then living in California, and Smith also gave him cannabis oil with the knowledge of his doctors. Chico was in remission by December 2013.

Ryder subsequently campaigned for access to medical cannabis in the United Kingdom, calling for an amnesty for patients using it and for regulation to ensure the quality of available oil. He said the family could not claim that cannabis oil alone had cured Chico's cancer, as he had received conventional treatment at the same time, and that he had been misquoted in press reports suggesting otherwise.

In October 2014 a fundraising event, Chico's Kickin Cancer, was held at the Palace Hotel in Manchester, headlined by Happy Mondays with sets from Northside, Peter Hook and the Light and Northern Uproar, and DJ sets from Mani, Clint Boon and 808 State.

Chico was one of five children featured in the 2018 documentary Weed the People, directed by Abby Epstein and produced with Ricki Lake, appearing alongside his mother.

== Death ==
Ryder was found dead by his mother on 15 July 2022, aged 58, the day the band were due to play at a festival in Sunderland. He had been reporting headaches upon arriving in Salford after flying from his home in Los Angeles. The family later reported that the coroner had said that Ryder died as a result of Ischaemic heart disease and diabetes, but they were waiting for the full coroner's report to be released.

His funeral was held in Manchester on 4 August 2022. Rowetta and Ian McCulloch of Echo & the Bunnymen sang at the service, and Alan McGee, Ian Brown and Bez shared memories of Ryder, whom McGee referred to by his nickname "Horse"; Peter Hook was among those attending.

== Legacy ==
Press coverage of Ryder's death credited him with the band's signature rolling groove, heard on singles including "Step On" and "Kinky Afro", and with the group's fusion of rave-era dance rhythms with indie rock. Assessing his contribution, Alexis Petridis pointed to Uncle Dysfunktional (2007), the album Happy Mondays recorded without Ryder and Mark Day, which he judged not a poor record but one that did not sound like the band.

Peter Hook described Ryder as a solid and dependable bass player, and said the Happy Mondays had needed him back on his return to the group, crediting him with giving the band its soul and passion. Tim Burgess of the Charlatans called him "a pioneer and an inspiration to all of us that followed". Ian Brown, who knew him as Pabs, remembered him as a great friend and musician.
