= Hallelujah (EP) =

EP by Happy Mondays
- Released: December 1989
- Genre: Madchester
- Length: 34:22; 40:24 (Australian release)
- Label: Factory
- Producer: Martin Hannett

Happy Mondays chronology
Madchester Rave On (1989)	Hallelujah (1989)	Pills 'n' Thrills and Bellyaches (1990)

Professional ratings
Review scores
Source	Rating
AllMusic	4/5 stars

Hallelujah is a 7-track EP by Madchester band Happy Mondays, released in the US and Australia in 1989 and featuring a number of remixes by Paul Oakenfold. "Hallelujah (MacColl Mix)" was created by Steve Lillywhite and features Kirsty MacColl. Oakenfold remixed "Hallelujah" with Andrew Weatherall and "Rave On" with Terry Farley. The club mix of "Hallelujah" was ranked at number 11 in NME's list of "The 50 Best Remixes Ever".

== Track listing ==
1. "Hallelujah" (MacColl Mix) – 2:39
2. "Clap Your Hands" – 3:28
3. "Holy Ghost" – 2:50
4. "Rave On" – 6:10
5. "Hallelujah" (Club Mix) – 6:27
6. "Rave On" (Club Mix) – 5:38
7. "W.F.L." (Think About The Future Mix) – 7:10

The Australian release has an additional track: "He's Gonna Step on You Again – Step On" (Stuff It in Mix) – 5:54. This track occurs as track 5, and the remaining tracks; "Hallelujah" (Club Mix), "Rave On" (Club Mix) and "W.F.L. (Think About The Future Mix) appear in the track positions 6, 7 and 8 respectively.
