= Twisting My Melon: The Autobiography =

2011 book by Shaun Ryder

- Author: Shaun Ryder
- Language: English
- Subject: Happy Mondays
- Genre: Autobiography, music
- Publisher: Bantam Press
- Publication date: 15 September 2011
- Publication place: United Kingdom
- Media type: Print
- Pages: 368 (hardcover); 448 (paperback)
- ISBN: 978-0-552-16547-1
- OCLC: 846702756

Twisting My Melon: The Autobiography is a 2011 autobiography by the English singer, songwriter, and television personality Shaun Ryder, about his time fronting the rock bands Happy Mondays and Black Grape. The book received mainly positive reviews from music publications, several of which considered it an entertaining read.

== Background and writing ==
In the 1980s and 1990s, Shaun Ryder served as the frontman for English rock band Happy Mondays, releasing four studio albums with them, and then two more with his other band Black Grape. Journalist John Warburton, who had ghostwritten a sports column with Ryder, went on to write a book about Happy Mondays' first reunion in the late 1990s, and co-credited it to Ryder. He said he "didn't really have anything to do with it at all," explaining that Warburton had approached him to write a biography. Ryder said he was not interested in the idea at the time, but allowed him to accompany the band on tour and document the proceedings. For his autobiography, Ryder said he did research by combing through back issues of publications, such as Melody Maker and NME, combined with his "pals [telling] me stories I vaguely remember". He also visited pubs and clubs he used to frequent, coming across junkies he met 20 years prior.

== Content and publication ==
Twisting My Melon: The Autobiography is named after a catchphrase Ryder exclaimed during the opening moments of "Step On". The phrase itself stemming from Steve McQueen. The book details his early upbringing in Salford, dropping out of education to become a postman and discovering drugs in the process. He discussed forming Happy Mondays in 1980, their period on Factory Records and success with their third studio album Pills 'n' Thrills and Bellyaches (1990). Ryder admitted that this period was a "bit of a blur. I can actually remember the Sixties better than the Eighties," attributing this to having a thyroid condition. He referred to himself during this time as a caricature, akin to Alice Cooper.

Continuing with his time in Black Grape, Ryder covers a dispute with his former management team of William and Gloria Nicholl, which saw any earnings he made were used to pay off debt. He said this dispute postponed his career for a decade. Following this, Ryder would appear on reality TV shows such as Ghosthunting With... and I'm a Celebrity...Get Me Out of Here!. When asked what he learned about himself through making the book, he mentioned how drugs took a toll on his psyche: "Deaths of family members and friends that didn't even touch you. Drugs cut you off emotionally". It was first printed as a hardback edition on 15 September 2011 by Bantam Press; it was promoted with a launch event at the Waterstones in Manchester. A paperback iteration followed in August 2012 by Corgi Books, an imprint of Transworld.

== Critical reception and planned film adaptation ==
PRS for Music's Anita Awbi wrote that the book "provides wonderful insight into both Ryder's personal life, and the making of one of Manchester's most legendary bands". She said that the successful years of Happy Mondays are recounted "with humour and realism in equal measure, philosophically balancing the ups and downs to create an honest and compelling narrative". Steve Jelbert of The Independent said "few will read this highly entertaining, effortlessly egotistical tome for moral elevation". What's On North writer Margaret Chrystall gave it similar praise, stating that for "anyone interested in the tale of a proper maverick, shamen-like songwriter and performer – there’s plenty of unique memories packed into this must-read that should top the rock books of 2011 list".

Dorian Lynskey of The Guardian included the book on his list of the best books of 2011, though mentioned that Ryder's "memory is riddled with drug-induced potholes". The Times columnist Camilla Long was impressed by the "clarity of [Ryder's] recollection" to some of the events, though highlighted an occasion where he went to Brazil with Piers Morgan, which she called a "story that has elements of total fabrication". In a review for The Observer, journalist Kitty Empire said noted that while there were "countless accounts of [the Madchester] period already out there; what distinguishes Ryder's is the fact that it's finally coming out of the horse's mouth". Empire was dismayed at the lack of Ryder's "love for music", adding that the reader is given only "fleeting glimpses of the surreal poetics that made Ryder the dissolute bard of baggy".

In April 2013, Ryder said ITV were looking to make a movie adaptation of his autobiography. He mentioned that Danny Brocklehurst was drafted in to do the screenplay. By November 2013, the idea was switched to a TV show and was formally announced by ITV. Nothing came of this, but in September 2019 NME reported that a film adaptation of the book directed by Matt Greenhalgh was being planned. It would star Jack O'Connell as Ryder, with production planned for early 2020. In 2024, O'Connell confirmed that the film would not be made.

== See also ==
- Happy Mondays – Excess All Areas: A Biography
- Telling Stories – autobiography by Tim Burgess about contemporaries the Charlatans
