= Alan Erasmus =

British actor

- Born: 26 April 1949 (age 77); Didsbury, Manchester, Lancashire, England
- Occupations: Actor; record executive (former); musician (former)

Alan Erasmus (born 26 April 1949) is a British actor best known for his involvement in the Manchester music scene starting in the 1970s. He co-founded Factory Records with Tony Wilson, which signed Joy Division and the Happy Mondays. He also co-founded The Haçienda with Wilson, Rob Gretton and New Order, a Manchester nightclub which closed down in the summer of 1997.

As an actor, Erasmus appeared in several roles in the 1970s including ITV Playhouse and Play for Today, wherein he played minor roles.

He started off his career as an actor, appearing in the TV film Hard Labour by Mike Leigh.

He also managed the bands The Durutti Column and Fast Breeder.

Lennie James played him in the 2002 film 24 Hour Party People.
