= Shaun Ryder =

English singer (born 1962)

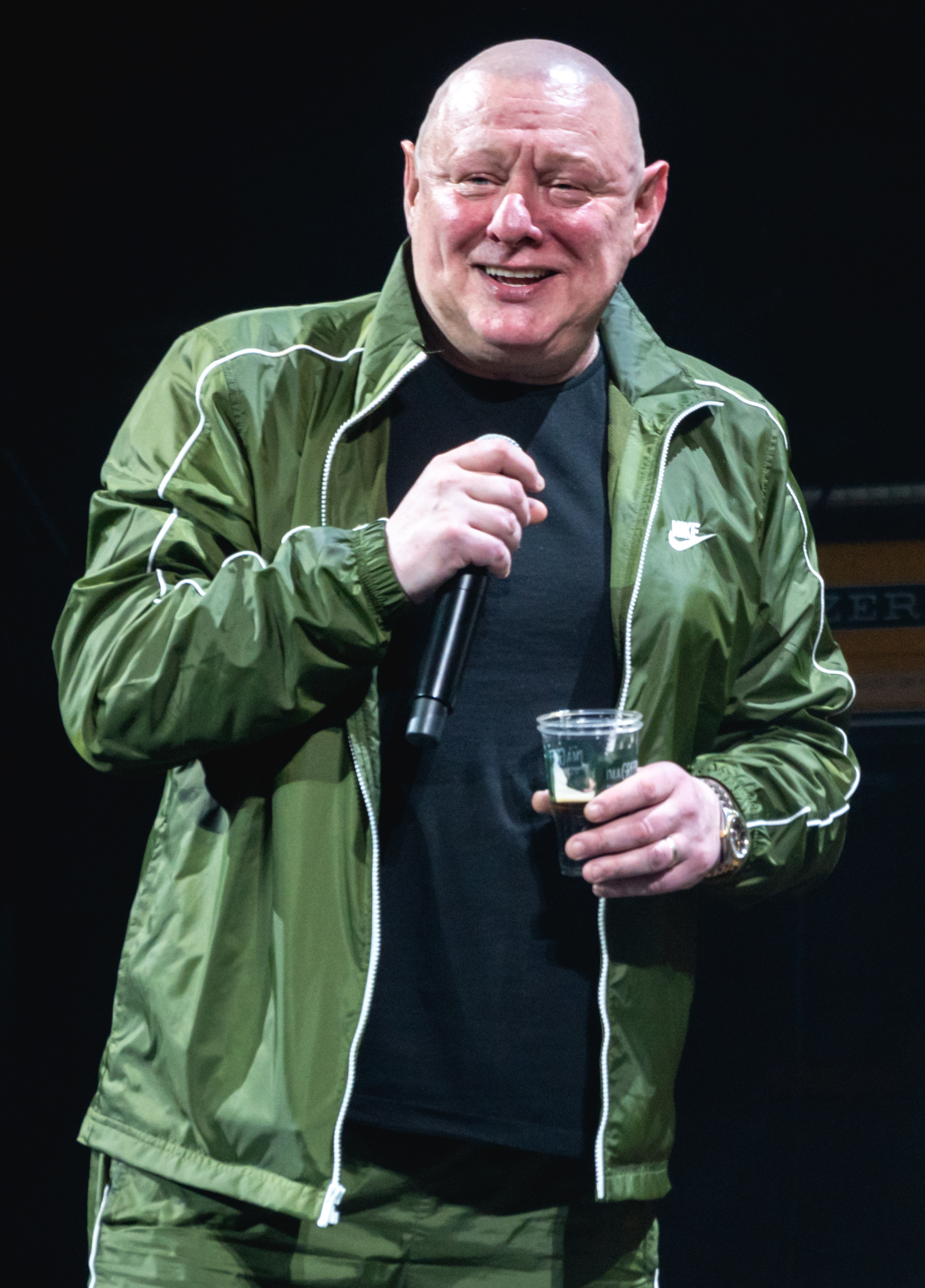
- Ryder in 2021

Background information
- Also known as: X
- Born: Shaun William George Ryder; 23 August 1962 (age 64); Little Hulton, Lancashire, England
- Genres: Baggy; alternative dance; post-punk; Madchester; neo-psychedelia; alternative rock; funk rock
- Occupations: Singer; songwriter; television personality
- Years active: 1980–present
- Label: OffWorld Sounds
- Member of: Happy Mondays; Black Grape
- Website: happymondaysofficial.co.uk

Shaun William George Ryder (born 23 August 1962) is an English singer, songwriter, and television personality. As the lead vocalist of the rock band Happy Mondays, he was a leading figure in the Madchester cultural scene during the late 1980s and early 1990s. In 1993, he formed Black Grape with former Happy Mondays dancer Bez. He was the runner-up on the tenth series of I'm a Celebrity...Get Me Out of Here!. In 2005, Ryder collaborated with Gorillaz on "Dare", which peaked at number one on the UK singles chart in September 2005, becoming the band's only UK number one single. Ryder is known for his distinctive sprechgesang and lyricism.

== Early life ==
Shaun William George Ryder was born on 23 August 1962 in Little Hulton, Lancashire, the son of nurse Linda and postman Derek (who would later become Happy Mondays' tour manager). By the age of 13, he had left school to work on a building site.

== Musical career ==
=== Happy Mondays ===
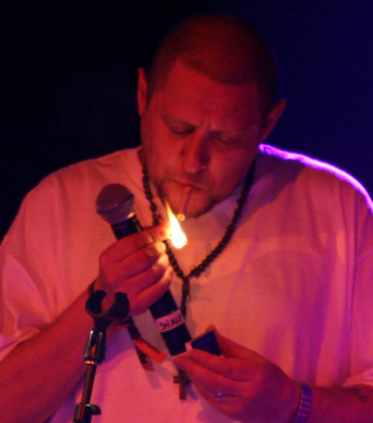
Ryder performing with Happy Mondays at Coachella in Indio, California, 2007

Happy Mondays' first release was the Forty Five EP, often called the Delightful EP after its first track. It was released on Factory Records in September 1985. Their debut studio album, Squirrel and G-Man Twenty Four Hour Party People Plastic Face Carnt Smile (White Out), was released in April 1987, and was produced by the Welsh musician John Cale of the Velvet Underground. This was followed by two further studio albums: Bummed (1988), produced by Martin Hannett, and Pills 'n' Thrills and Bellyaches (1990), produced by Paul Oakenfold and Steve Osborne. The latter, recorded at Capitol Studios in Los Angeles, California, went platinum in the UK, selling more than 350,000 copies. Singles "Step On" and "Kinky Afro" from this album both reached number 5 in the UK singles chart.

By the late 1980s, the Happy Mondays were an important part of the Madchester music scene and personified rave culture. Numerous world tours meant the band had international success as well as massive success in their home country. The line-up of the band during this first and most important ten-year phase never changed, and the six original members Shaun Ryder, Paul Ryder (Shaun's younger brother), Gaz Whelan, Paul Davis, Mark Day, and Mark "Bez" Berry remained a tight unit until the first incarnation came to an end in 1993. In 1990, The band headlined the Friday night at Glastonbury Festival in Pilton, Somerset. In November of that year, Paul McCartney commented in NME: "I saw the Happy Mondays on TV, and they reminded me of the Beatles in their 'Strawberry Fields' phase."

Musically, the band fused indie pop guitars with a rhythmic style that owed much to house music, Krautrock, funk, and Northern soul. Much of their music was remixed by popular DJs, emphasising the dance influences even further. In style and dress, they crossed hippy fashion and ideals with 1970s glamour. Sartorially and musically, the band helped to encourage the psychedelic revival associated with acid house.

Ryder's early years as the lead vocalist for Happy Mondays were depicted in the British biographical comedy drama film 24 Hour Party People (2002), a semi-fictional account of Factory Records and the Manchester music scene of the 1980s and early 1990s. In the film, Ryder is portrayed by Danny Cunningham.

Ryder has taken part in two reformations of Happy Mondays (1999–2000 and 2004–present). He also released his debut solo studio album, Amateur Night in the Big Top, in 2003.

In 2000, following the annual Big Day Out festival in Australia with Happy Mondays, Ryder stayed on in Perth, Western Australia with Pete Carroll, who had a record label called Offworld Sounds. While in Perth he recorded Amateur Night in the Big Top, a studio album of dub trip hop music with Carroll, Shane Norton, Stephen Mallinder of Cabaret Voltaire, and Lucky Oceans of the American Western swing music group Asleep at the Wheel. Uncut called it, "exhilarating stuff. Another wildly implausible Ryder comeback" while Ministry of Sound said it was "A remarkable album. The most vitriolic lyrics this side of [Bob] Dylan's 'Ballad of a Thin Man' and Sex Pistols 'EMI'". The album was recorded quickly during a few late night sessions in Carroll's garage studio during an extremely hot Perth summer. The album was subsequently released on Offworld Sounds.

In 2004, Happy Mondays reunited to play a comeback gig called "Get Loaded in the Park" on Clapham Common, with only two original members. Two years later they released the single "Playground Superstar", featured in the sports drama film Goal (2005), which was released after Bez had won Celebrity Big Brother. In 2007 Happy Mondays released their fifth studio album, Uncle Dysfunktional. In 2009 he made a cameo appearance as himself in Channel 4 drama Shameless.

=== Black Grape ===
In 1993 Ryder formed a new rock band, Black Grape. Their debut studio album, It's Great When You're Straight...Yeah (1995), topped the UK Albums Chart for a week. However, their follow-up studio album, Stupid Stupid Stupid, did not achieve the same critical or commercial success, and the band broke-up in 1998. The group reformed briefly in 2010, and released a single in 2015, The singer signed to Warren Askew & Oliver Moheda at Total Artist Management in 2008 for management and in August 2017, released Pop Voodoo, their first studio album since 1997. In the beginning of 2024 the band released their fourth studio album Orange Head.

=== Other work ===
Ryder collaborated with the alternative rock band Intastella in 1993 on the track "Can You Fly Like You Mean It?" and in 1997, Ryder featured on the Agent Provocateur's debut studio album Where the Wild Things Are on the track "Agent Dan".

He appeared on the English tenor Russell Watson's debut studio album The Voice (2001), lending his vocals to a cover version of the Freddie Mercury and Montserrat Caballé song "Barcelona".

In 2004, Ryder had a voice acting role in the action-adventure game Grand Theft Auto: San Andreas in which he played Maccer, a washed-up, masturbation-addicted musician who was planning a major comeback tour.

Ryder appeared in Peter Kay's "Is This the Way to Amarillo?" charity music video in 2005. Also in 2005, he collaborated with Gorillaz on "Dare", a song on their second studio album Demon Days. Chris Evans stated at the Brit Awards 2006 that the song was originally called "It's There", but was changed as Ryder's thick Mancunian accent made him pronounce the word "there" as "dare".

In 2021, he released his second solo studio album Visits from Future Technology.

In 2023, Ryder collaborated with the indie pop band the Lottery Winners on the track "Money" from their fifth studio album Anxiety Replacement Therapy. This track was released as a single on 16 February 2023.

== Other work ==
=== Writing ===
Ryder wrote a column for the Daily Sport, in which he commented on current events and celebrities. The column was ghostwritten with journalist John Warburton, who would write a book about the Happy Mondays' reunion in the late 1990s, and co-credited it to Ryder. He said he "didn't really have anything to do with it at all," explaining that Warburton had approached him to write a biography. Ryder said he was not interested in the idea at the time, but allowed him to accompany the band on tour and document the proceedings.

In 2011, Ryder published his autobiography, Twisting My Melon: The Autobiography. It was optioned by Granada Television and writer Danny Brocklehurst enlisted to write the screenplay.

=== Television ===
In 2004 he was the subject of Richard Macer's BBC3 documentary Shaun Ryder: The Ecstasy and the Agony. In 2006, he appeared in Shameless (series 6 episode 3) as himself.

Ryder was a contestant on the tenth series of ITV's survival reality television show I'm a Celebrity...Get Me Out of Here! in 2010, where he finished second behind Stacey Solomon. In January 2011 Ryder appeared on the first series of the ITV programme That Sunday Night Show, and again on the second series in September 2011. He collaborated with fellow I'm a Celebrity contestant Stacey Solomon at the 2011 National Television Awards.

In 2013, Ryder hosted the television show Shaun Ryder on UFOs on History Channel UK. He has a lifelong interest in UFOs and claims that he has personally encountered space aliens, stating that he saw a UFO for the first time in 1978.

In 2016, he appeared on Would I Lie to You?, being asked if he had trained his cat to wink.

In 2017 Ryder appeared on Celebrity Juice as a member of Fearne Cotton's team. The next year he starred in ITV's 100 years younger in 21 days and appeared on Celebrity Mastermind, with the specialist subject of Manchester.

In 2019, Ryder was interviewed on Sam Delaney's News Thing. In August 2020, Ryder appeared in BBC Two comedy Mandy created by Diane Morgan in which he portrayed a fictional version of himself.

In 2023, he appeared in I'm a Celebrity...South Africa, but was one of the first celebrities to be sent home after losing a trial in a double eviction on Saturday April 29, 2023.

== Personal life ==
Ryder has six children by four women, including a daughter, Coco, with Oriole, daughter of the Scottish musician Donovan.

Ryder's past substance use is well-documented; Kyle O'Sullivan of the Daily Mirror writing in 2022 that "after every gig on [the Happy Mondays' 1990] Pills 'n' Thrills and Bellyaches tour, Shaun would dive into a cocktail of booze, cocaine, heroin, ecstasy and marijuana". Ryder's heroin addiction lasted around 20 years, ending around 2002, although Ryder has stated that "there's been no damage off [heroin]" and that he never injected the drug, but rather smoked it, and saying he overcame it by taking up cycling. Ryder also used crack cocaine and methamphetamine, to which he attributes the loss of his teeth. Ryder stated in January 2024 that he hasn't used hard drugs since the early 2000s, and no longer keeps alcohol in his home, only drinking when out.

Ryder contested contracts he drew up with his Black Grape management team, compiled in 1993. Following his dismissal of the company, they sued him for £160,000. The income from his £30,000 a year Daily Sport column went solely to cover his costs. His appearance on I'm a Celebrity...Get Me Out of Here! (2010) and a £130,000 book deal financed Ryder out of the contract.

Ryder was diagnosed with ADHD and dyslexia later in life, saying in the 60s and 70s there was "no such thing as learning difficulties". "When I was at school they didn't know about ADHD, there were just four sets, one being the brightest and four being crowd control"... so "for the first 40-something years of my life I didn't know I had it [ADHD]". In a 2026 interview on The Tommy Tiernan Show, he mentioned that he had also been diagnosed with autism.

In 2021 he took part in Channel 4's Stand Up and Deliver; mentored by the comedian Jason Manford, he developed his own stand-up set. Manford explained in an interview “Shaun's got severe ADHD, so remembering things, collecting information and taking on new thoughts, it's been a real challenge."

Ryder took part in Channel 4's Fame in the Family; where Ryder discovered three long lost relatives, Tracey and James had the most direct blood connection, both second cousins.

== Discography ==
Solo studio albums

- Amateur Night in the Big Top (2003)
- Visits from Future Technology (2021)

Compilation album

- Shaun William Ryder XXX: 30 Years of Bellyaching (2010)

== Videography ==
Solo

- "Don't Take My Kindness for Weakness" (with the Heads, 1996)
- "Barcelona" (with Russell Watson, 2001)
- "Scooter Girl" (2003)
- "Dare" (with Gorillaz, 2005)
- "Is This the Way to Amarillo?" (2005)

== Awards ==
- NME Single of the Year 1996 – Black Grape's "Reverend Black Grape"
- Godlike Genius – NME Awards, 2000
- John Peel Music Innovation Award (for Gorillaz) – Shockwaves NME Awards 2006

== Bibliography ==
- Middles, Mick (1997). Shaun Ryder – Happy Mondays, Black Grape & Other Traumas. Independent Music Press. ISBN 1-897783-11-6.
- Verrico, Lisa (1998). High Life 'N' Low Down Dirty – The Thrills and Spills of Shaun Ryder. Ebury Press. ISBN 0-09-185419-9.
- Middles, Mick (1998). Shaun Ryder... In His Own Words. Omnibus Press. ISBN 0-7119-6815-2.
- Bez (1998). Freaky Dancin' – Me and the Mondays. Pan. ISBN 0-330-48197-5.
- Haslam, Dave (1999). Manchester, England. 4th Estate. ISBN 1-84115-146-7.
- Wilson, Tony (2002). 24 Hour Party People – What The Sleeve Notes Never Tell You. Channel 4 Books. ISBN 0-7522-2025-X.
- Warburton, John & Ryder, Shaun (2003). Hallelujah!: The Extraordinary Story of Shaun Ryder and "Happy Mondays". Virgin Books. ISBN 1-4053-1031-6.
- Ryder, Shaun (2011). Twisting My Melon: The Autobiography. Bantam Press.
