= Karl Denver =

Scottish singer (1931–1998)

- Birth name: Angus Murdo McKenzie
- Born: 16 December 1931; Springburn, Glasgow, Scotland
- Died: 21 December 1998 (aged 67); Manchester, England
- Genres: Pop
- Years active: 1955–1998
- Labels: Decca; Factory

Karl Denver (16 December 1931 – 21 December 1998) was a Scottish singer, who, with his trio had a series of UK hit singles in the early 1960s. Most famous of these was a 1961 version of "Wimoweh", which showed off Denver's falsetto yodelling register. He reached the Top 20 with his first five yodel-based singles.

== Career ==
Denver was born Angus Murdo McKenzie in Springburn, Glasgow, and was well travelled by the time he took up singing, having had a previous career in the Norwegian Merchant Navy. He also had a country music influence, having lived in Nashville, Tennessee, US, for a short time before being deported from there as an illegal immigrant in 1959. In the US, he adopted the new name that he retained for the remainder of his singing career.

In the early 1960s, he formed a trio which included Kevin Neill (25 July 1931, Manchester, Lancashire – 13 March 2010, Blackley, Manchester) and Gerry Cottrell (born Gerard Cottrell, 18 December 1933, Manchester, Lancashire – 24 November 2006).

Denver's song, "Never Goodbye", was an entry in A Song for Europe in 1962 and was another chart hit. In 1963, he appeared in the film Just for Fun, along with Bobby Vee, the Vernons Girls, and various other American and British pop music acts. He also appeared on BBC Radio a few times alongside The Beatles on a show named after a song he performed with them called "Side by Side".

After the mid-1960s, Denver worked mainly on the cabaret circuit. However, in 1989 he enjoyed a brief rise in profile after guesting on Madchester band, the Happy Mondays' single, "Lazyitis (One-Armed Boxer)", on Factory Records (FAC 222). Denver also appeared in The Happy Mondays' video for the song, although he contracted pneumonia whilst filming the video. Following this collaboration Factory released two further Denver recordings, "Wimoweh '89" (FAC 228) and "Indambinigi" (FAC 278; credited to Karl Denver and Steve Lima).

In 1993 he released his final album, Just Loving You, aimed at the country music market. In mid-1998, Denver began recording a new album, but died before it was completed. The finished tracks were included on a re-release of Just Loving You entitled Movin' On in 1999. The final song he recorded was "I Can't Go on This Way".

== Death ==
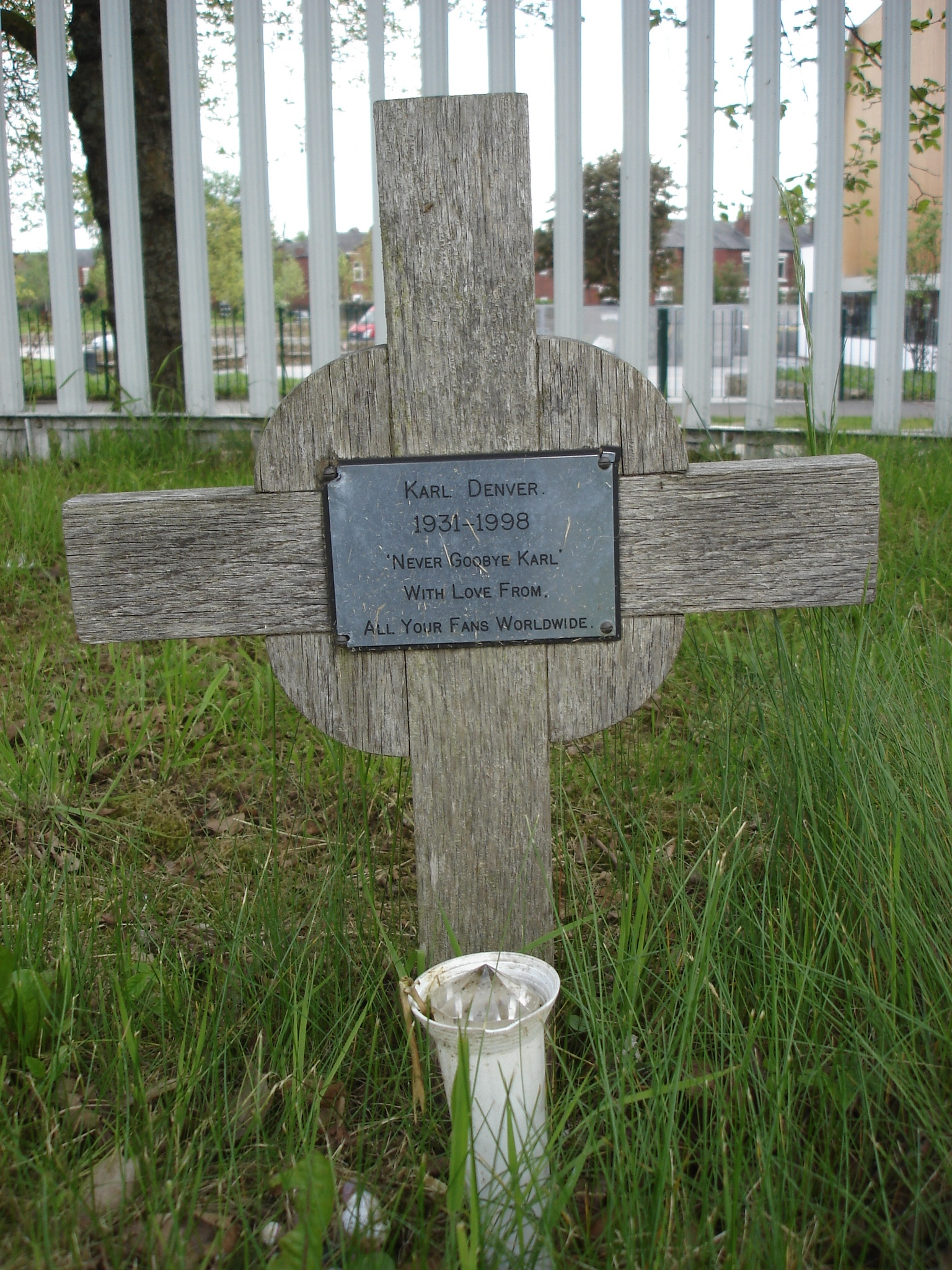
Karl Denver's wooden grave marker, Stockport Borough Cemetery

Denver died from a brain tumour in December 1998, at the age of 67. His ashes are buried in Stockport Borough Cemetery.

== Family life ==
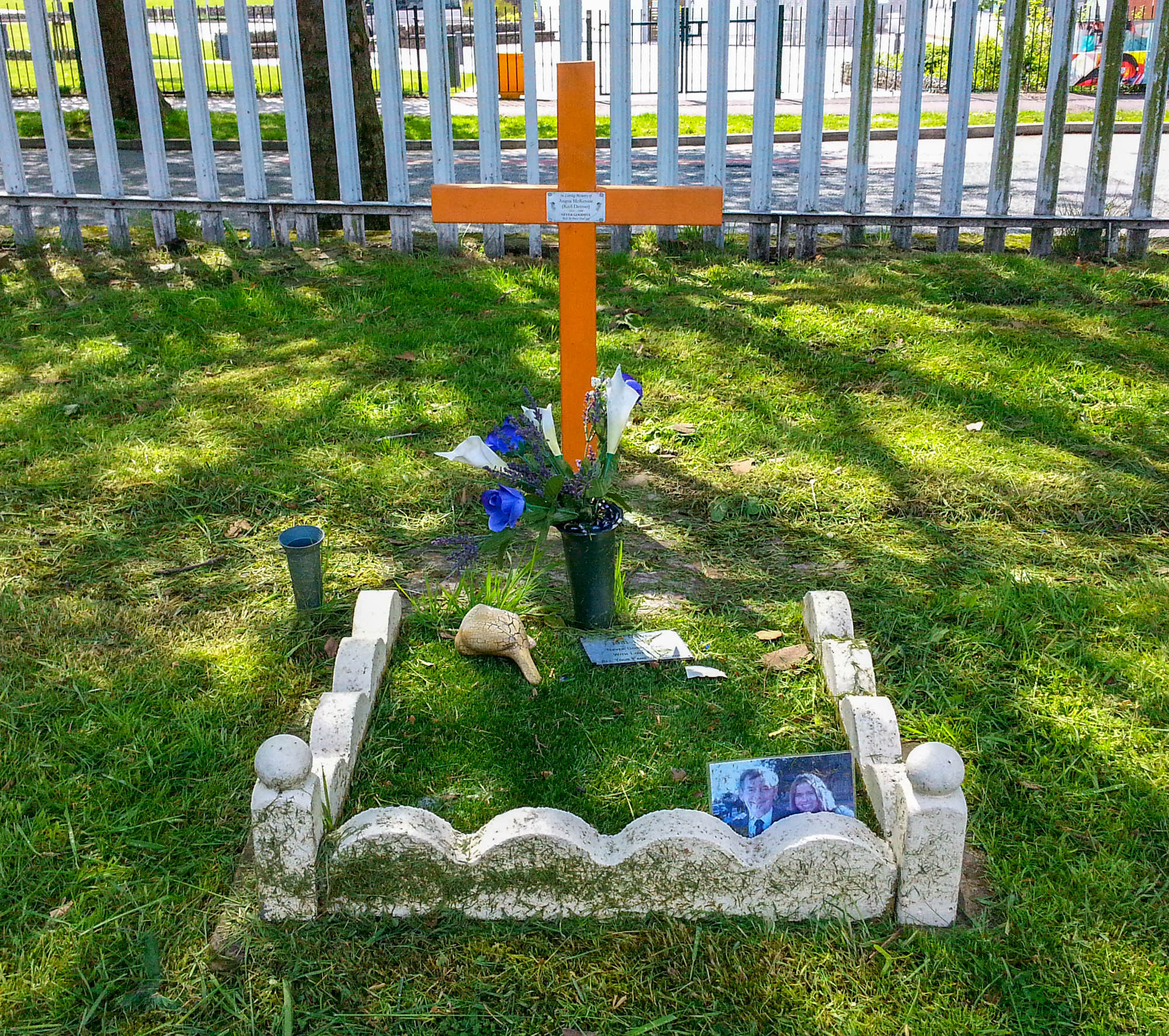
Karl Denver's grave in Stockport Borough Cemetery, seen on 11 May 2019

Twice married, Denver had eleven children. Two from his first marriage to Jean, three from his second partner Alma, one from his third partner Jean, and two from his second marriage to Andrea. In addition, he had three other children from other relationships.

== Discography ==
=== Singles ===
- "Marcheta" – 1961 – UK No. 8
- "Mexicali Rose" – 1961 – UK No. 8
- "Wimoweh" – 1962 – UK No. 4
- "Never Goodbye" – 1962 – UK No. 9
- "A Little Love a Little Kiss" – 1962 – UK No. 19
- "Blue Week-end" – 1962 – UK No. 33
- "Pastures of Plenty" – 1962 – UK
- "Can You Forgive Me" – 1963 – UK No. 32
- "Indian Love Call" – 1963 – UK No. 32
- "Still" – 1963 – UK No. 13
- "My World of Blue" – 1964 – UK No. 29
- "Love Me with All Your Heart" – 1964 – UK No. 37
- "Lazyitis – One Armed Boxer" – 1990 – UK No. 46 – Happy Mondays and Karl Denver

=== Albums ===
- Wimoweh – 1961 – UK No. 7
- Karl Denver at The Yew Tree – 1964
