= Madchester Rave On =

EP by Happy Mondays
- Released: November 1989
- Genre: House, Madchester, baggy
- Label: Factory
- Producer: Martin Hannett

Happy Mondays chronology
Bummed (1988)	Madchester Rave On (1989)	Hallelujah (1989)

Madchester Rave On is the second EP by Happy Mondays. It was released in November 1989 on Factory Records. The track "Hallelujah" became the band's breakthrough release, reaching the top twenty in the UK and leading to the group's first Top of the Pops appearance.

Shortly afterwards, Happy Mondays released Madchester Rave On – The Remixes, a three-track EP of club DJ remixes. In the US, three of the EP tracks and two of the subsequent remixes were compiled into the seven-track American EP Hallelujah.

== Track listing ==
Madchester Rave On E.P.

- Limited 7"/12"/CD/Cassette
1. "Hallelujah"
2. "Holy Ghost"
3. "Clap Your Hands"
4. "Rave On"
- 7"
1. "Hallelujah (The MacColl Mix)"
2. "Hallelujah (In Out Mix)"

Madchester – Rave On (Remixes)

- CD/Cassette
1. "Hallelujah (Club Mix)" – Mix by Paul Oakenfold and Andy Wetherall (sic - misspelled on the tape credits)
2. "Rave On (Club Mix)" – Mix by Paul Oakenfold and Terry Farley
3. "Hallelujah (In Out Mix)" – Mix by Steve Lillywhite
- 12"
1. "Hallelujah (Club Mix)"
2. "Rave On (Club Mix)"

== Charts ==
Chart (1989)	Peak Position
UK Singles Chart	19
UK Independent Singles Chart	1
