= Bez (dancer) =

British dancer, author and media personality

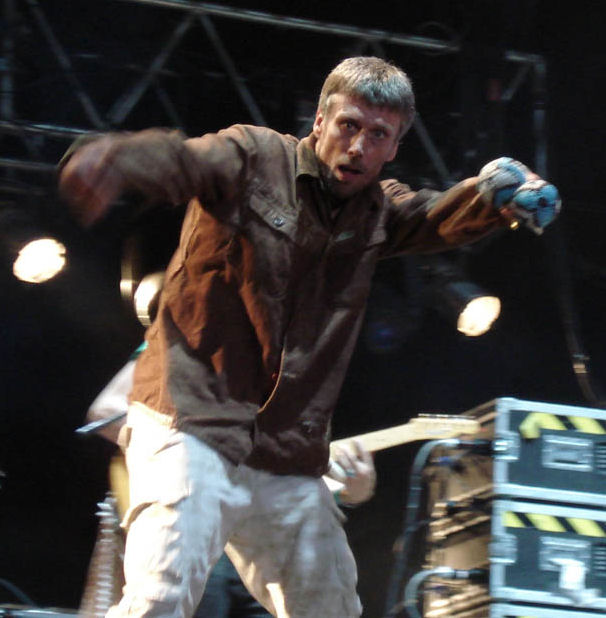
- Bez performing in 2007

Background information
- Born: Mark Berry; 18 April 1964 (age 62); Bolton, Lancashire, England
- Genres: Alternative rock; Madchester; alternative dance; baggy; acid house
- Occupations: Dancer; media personality
- Instruments: Maracas; tambourine
- Years active: 1980–present

Mark Berry (born 18 April 1964), better known as Bez, is an English dancer and DJ. He was a member of the rock bands Happy Mondays and Black Grape.

== Early life ==
Mark Berry was born on 18 April 1964 in Bolton, Lancashire, the son of parents from the Norris Green district of Liverpool. His father was a detective inspector. He grew up in Little Hulton and Walkden, before moving to live with his grandparents in Wigan at the age of 16.

== Career ==
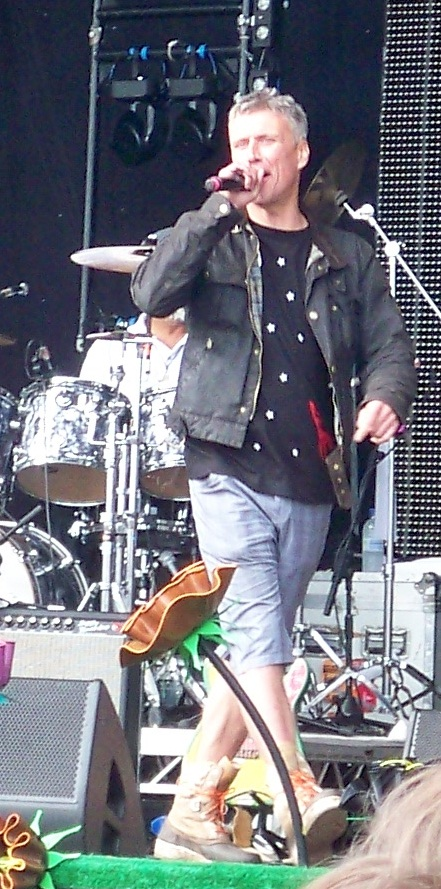
Bez introducing Ziggy Marley at GuilFest in 2011

Bez was the maraca player, dancer, and de facto mascot of rock band Happy Mondays, having been invited by lead singer Shaun Ryder shortly after the band was formed. The band's second single, "Freaky Dancin'", was rumoured to be a tribute to Bez. However, Ryder stated that this was not the case in his autobiography Twistin' My Melon.

After the Happy Mondays broke up, Bez became a member of Ryder's subsequent group Black Grape, but he left them in 1997. That year, he had a feature on the BBC Two television programme The Sunday Show called Science with Bez. When both men faced large tax bills, Bez and Ryder reformed the Happy Mondays in 1998, but it was short-lived.

A book about his experiences in both bands, Freaky Dancin', was published by Pan MacMillan in 2000. In the opening chapter, Bez detailed an incident during a Happy Mondays gig at Manchester's Haçienda nightclub in 1986. In the middle of the set, he fell off the stage and cut his forehead:

"The doc tells me to take it easy and put my feet up. I thought, 'I'm not fucking havin' that.' I got some of lead guitarist Moose's acid, dripped it in the cut and ran back out with me shakers. Fuckin' raz!"

He appeared on Celebrity Big Brother in 2005, in order to pay off his outstanding tax bills, and was voted as the winner of the series. He used some of his winnings to improve the engine of his London black cab; the television show Pimp My Ride UK customised it to make it suit him. After the cab was "pimped", it had twenty speakers, eight amps, two DVD players, fifteen TV screens and a camera on the grille linked to one of the screens, the sign saying TAXI on the top was changed to PIMP, and it had purple paint on the outside.

In 2006, Bez was promoting a compilation album titled Bez's Madchester Anthems: Sorted Tunes from Back in the Day. The Happy Mondays again reformed: the third incarnation of the group had Bez touring with them. On 2 July 2007, they released their first studio album in 15 years entitled Uncle Dysfunktional. On 4 September 2007, Bez went head-to-head with royal correspondent James Whitaker on ITV television programme Don't Call Me Stupid and beat him. Bez and James taught each other about their respective specialist subjects: the Manchester music scene and royal etiquette, and then they were quizzed on what they had learnt. This was followed by a general knowledge round. Despite not knowing that the Queen has two birthdays, Bez won. His prize, as selected by James, was a bottle of expensive red wine and a decanter so he didn't have to drink any "poor person's supermarket plonk".

Bez took part in Series 4 of Adrenaline Junkie (aired on 1 October 2008 on ITV2), the tasks involved taking on the world's biggest bungee down the front of the dam which featured in GoldenEye, building an ice hotel in the mountains, and undertook a jump from one cable car to another. On 29 January 2012, Ryder announced on the radio station XFM that the band would return with the original and definitive line-up of himself, his brother Paul Ryder on bass, Bez, Gary Whelan on drums, Rowetta as backing vocalist, Mark Day on guitar and Paul Davis on keyboards. They appeared on ITV's This Morning, and were interviewed by Phillip Schofield. The band announced in September 2012 that they were writing their first album with the original line-up in more than 20 years.

Bez was announced as the headliner on the DJ stage at upcoming festival Party in the Pines on 3 May 2014. In September 2018, he took part in a special episode of Bargain Hunt where he and Rowetta competed against Jarvis Cocker and Candida Doyle from Pulp. Bez and Rowetta won the episode by earning a profit of £8, but it was later discovered that Firouzeh Razavi, at that time Bez's girlfriend, had bought two of their items. As it was against the rules of the programme for friends and family of the teams to buy items the teams were selling, Cocker and Doyle were made the winners and Bez had to hand over £8 from his own pocket.

== Personal life ==
Berry lives in Urmston, Greater Manchester. He is a fan of Manchester United, a beekeeper and beer brewer in his spare time, and has lived on land-shares in Herefordshire and Wales. At some point, he lived next door to Shaun Ryder in Padfield, near Hadfield in High Peak, Derbyshire.

Declared bankrupt in 2005 and 2008, Bez was also convicted in August 2010 of physically assaulting his ex-girlfriend Monica Ward, with whom he has a son, by throttling and threatening to kill her. He was sentenced to four weeks in prison after having first received a community service sentence but refusing to co-operate. He was arrested at London's Euston Station in November 2010 for breaching a restraining order granted to Ward following the assault, and escorted to appear before magistrates in Manchester.

In November 2014, Bez became a patron of homeless organisation Coffee4Craig.

Bez stood as a candidate for the Salford and Eccles constituency in the 2015 UK General Election. The incumbent Member of Parliament (MP), Hazel Blears, announced her intention to stand down at the election. Bez ran on a platform of "free energy, free food and free anything". He received 703 votes (1.6% of the total turnout) which placed him in sixth position in the constituency. The seat was won by the new Labour Party candidate, Rebecca Long-Bailey, who received 21,364 votes (49.4% of the total).

In January 2021, during the third lockdown of the COVID-19 pandemic, Bez began operating as an online fitness instructor producing content on YouTube under the title "Buzzin’ with Bez".

Bez married his partner, fitness instructor Firouzeh Razavi, on 3 September 2022. The two had been in a relationship since 2014. Bez had made a Wooden Stonehenge for a Game of Thrones-style wedding. He has three sons from two relationships.

== In popular culture ==
In the film 24 Hour Party People, Bez is played by Chris Coghill.

In August 2021, it was announced that Bez would be a competitor on BBC's Celebrity MasterChef and in October 2021 that he would be a competitor on the fourteenth series of Dancing on Ice in 2022.

== See also ==
- List of dancers

Preceded by Mark Owen	Celebrity Big Brother (British TV series) Winner; Series 3 (2005)	Succeeded by Chantelle Houghton
