= Buzzcocks discography =

- Studio albums: 11
- Extended plays: 10
- Live albums: 6
- Compilation albums: 15
- Singles: 36

The English rock band Buzzcocks' discography consists of eleven studio albums, six live albums, fifteen compilations, ten extended plays and twenty-six singles.

== Studio albums ==
Title	Album details	Peak chart positions		
Title	Album details	UK	NZ	US
Another Music in a Different Kitchen	Released: March 1978; Label: United Artists	15	—	—
Love Bites	Released: September 1978; Label: United Artists	13	—	—
A Different Kind of Tension	Released: September 1979; Label: United Artists	26	50	163
Trade Test Transmissions	Released: June 1993; Label: Castle, Caroline	—	—	—
All Set	Released: May 1996; Label: I.R.S.	—	—	—
Modern	Released: September 1999; Label: Go-Kart	—	—	—
Buzzcocks	Released: March 2003; Label: Merge	—	—	—
Flat-Pack Philosophy	Released: March 2006; Label: Cooking Vinyl	—	—	—
The Way	Released: May 2014; Label: PledgeMusic	—	—	—
Sonics in the Soul	Released: September 2022; Label: Cherry Red	—	—	—
Attitude Adjustment	Released: 30 January 2026; Label: Cherry Red	—	—	—
"—" denotes release did not chart.

== Archival albums ==
Title	Album details
Time's Up	Released: 1991; Label: Document; Originally recorded in 1976 and heavily bootlegged until its official release in 1991.

== Live albums ==
Title	Album details	Peak chart positions
Title	Album details	UK
Lest We Forget	Released: June 1988; Label: ROIR	—
Live at the Roxy Club April '77	Released: September 1989; Label: Absolutely Free	—
Entertaining Friends	Released: February 1992; Label: EMI, I.R.S.	—
French	Released: 1995; Label: Dojo	—
Encore du Pain (Live in Paris)	Released: September 1995; Label: Dojo	—
Beating Hearts	Released: 2000; Label: Get Back	—
Small Songs With Big Hearts	Released: 2001; Label: Get Back	—
30	Released: January 2008; Label: Cooking Vinyl	—

== Compilation albums ==
Title	Album details	Peak chart positions	
Title	Album details	UK	NZ
Singles Going Steady	Released: September 1979; Label: I.R.S, United Artists	—	44
Total Pop	Released: 13 April 1987; Label: Weird System	—	—
The Peel Sessions Album	Released: 1989; Label: Strange Fruit	—	—
Product	Released: October 1989; Label: EMI, Restless Retro	—	—
Operator's Manual: Buzzcocks Best	Released: October 1991; Label: I.R.S., EMI	—	—
Chronology	Released: June 1997; Label: EMI	—	—
I Don't Mind the Buzzcocks	Released: September 1997; Label: EMI	—	—
BBC Sessions	Released: October 1998; Label: EMI, BBC Music	—	—
Ever Fallen in Love? Buzzcocks Finest	Released: April 2002; Label: EMI	—	—
Inventory	Released: May 2003; Label: EMI	—	—
The Complete Singles Anthology	Released: May 2003; Label: EMI	—	—
Driving You Insane	Released: April 2011; Label: Secret Records	—	—
A Different Compilation	Released: June 2011; Label: Cooking Vinyl	—	—
What Do I Get	Released: June 2011; Label: Secret Records	—	—
More Product In A Different Compilation (Best of The United Artists Recordings 1978–1980)	Released: April 2016; Label: Org Music, United Artists Records, Rhino Custom Products	—	—
Sell You Everything 1991–2014	Released: May 2020; Label: Cherry Red	—	—
The 1991 Demo Album	Released: May 2020; Label: Cherry Red	—	—
Late For the Train: Live and in Session 1989–2016	Released: October 2020; Label: Cherry Red	—	—
"—" denotes release did not chart.

== Extended plays ==
Title	Album details	Peak chart positions
Title	Album details	UK
Spiral Scratch	Released: 29 January 1977; Label: New Hormones	31
I Am the Amazing Buzzcocks	Released: May 1978; Label: Wizard; Track listing: 1. "What Do I Get?"; 2. "Fast Cars"; 3. "Moving Away from the Pulsebeat" / "The End"	—
Parts 1-3	Released: February 1981; Label: I.R.S; Track listing: 1. "Are Everything"; 2. "Strange Thing"; 3. "What Do You Know"; 4. "Why She's the Girl from the Chainstore"; 5. "Airwaves Dream"; 6. "Running Free"	—
Peel Sessions	Released: 1987; Label: Strange Fruit; Track listing: 1. "Fast Cars"; 2. "Moving Away from the Pulsebeat"; 3. "What Do I Get?"	—
The Early Years Live	Released: 1987; Label: Receiver; Track listing: 1. "Orgasm Addict"; 2. "No Reply"; 3. "Boredom"; 4. "Love Battery"	—
The Fab Four	Released: October 1989; Label: EMI; Track listing: 1. "Ever Fallen in Love (With Someone You Shouldn't've)"; 2. "Promises"; 3. "Everybody's Happy Nowadays"; 4. "Harmony in My Head"	83
Alive Tonight	Released: April 1991; Label: Planet Pacific; Track listing: 1. "Alive Tonight"; 2. "Serious Crime"; 3. "Last to Know"; 4. "Successful Street"	—
Innocent	Released: May 1993; Label: Castle, Caroline; Track listing: 1. "Innocent"; 2. "Who'll Help Me to Forget?"; 3. "Inside"	—
Do It	Released: August 1993; Label: Castle, BMG; Track listing: 1. "Do It" [remix]; 2. "Trash Away"; 3. "All Over You" [live]	—
Libertine Angel	Released: April 1994; Label: Castle, BMG; Track listing: 1. "Libertine Angel"; 2. "Roll It Over"; 3. Excerpt from "Prison Riot Hostage"	—
"—" denotes release did not chart.

== Singles ==
Title	Year	Peak chart positions	Album
Title	Year	UK	Album
"Orgasm Addict" b/w "Whatever Happened To...?"	1977	56 (Note: Chart position is from the official UK "Breakers List".)	Non-album singles
"What Do I Get?" b/w "Oh Shit!"	1978	37	Non-album singles
"I Don't Mind" b/w "Autonomy"	1978	55	Another Music in a Different Kitchen
"Moving Away from the Pulsebeat"	1978	—	Another Music in a Different Kitchen
"Love You More" b/w "Noise Annoys"	1978	34	Non-album single
"Ever Fallen in Love (With Someone You Shouldn't've)" b/w "Just Lust"	1978	12	Love Bites
"Promises" b/w "Lipstick"	1978	20	Non-album singles
"Everybody's Happy Nowadays" b/w "Why Can't I Touch It?"	1979	29	Non-album singles
"Harmony in My Head" b/w "Something's Gone Wrong Again"	1979	32	Non-album singles
"You Say You Don't Love Me" b/w "Raison d'Etre"	1979	—	A Different Kind of Tension
"I Believe" b/w "Something's Gone Wrong Again"	1980	—	A Different Kind of Tension
"Are Everything" b/w "Why She's a Girl from the Chainstore"	1980	61	Parts 1-3
"Strange Thing" b/w "Airwaves Dream"	1980	—	Parts 1-3
"Running Free" b/w "What Do You Know"	1980	—	Parts 1-3
"Successful Street"	1990	—	Non-album singles
"Alive Tonight" b/w "Serious Crime"	1991	—	Non-album singles
"Innocent" b/w "Who'll Help Me to Forget" / "Inside"	1993	—	Trade Test Transmissions
"Do It" b/w "Trash Away" (Live) / "All Over You" (live)	1993	—	Trade Test Transmissions
"Libertine Angel" b/w "Roll It Over" / "Excerpt from 'Prison Riot Hostage'"	1994	—	Non-album single
"Isolation" b/w "Noise Annoys"	1995	—	Trade Test Transmissions
"Totally from the Heart"	1996	—	All Set
"Thunder of Hearts"	1999	—	Modern
"Soul on a Rock"	1999	—	Modern
"Jerk" b/w "Don't Come Back" / "Oh Shit!" (live)	2003	—	Buzzcocks
"Sick City Sometimes" b/w "Never Believe It" / "Paradise"	2003	—	Buzzcocks
"Wish I Never Loved You" b/w "Don't Matter What You Say" / "Love Battery" (live)	2006	146	Flat-Pack Philosophy
"Sell You Everything" b/w "Sixteen" (live) / "Darker By The Hour"	2006	—	Flat-Pack Philosophy
"Reconciliation" b/w "See Through You" / "Holding Me Down"	2006	—	Flat-Pack Philosophy
"It's Not You" b/w "Generation Suicide"	2014	—	The Way
"In the Back" b/w "Disappointment"	2014	—	The Way
"The Way" b/w "Dream On Baby"	2014	—	The Way
"Gotta Get Better" b/w "Destination Zero"	2020	—	Non-album singles
"All Over You (Demo)" b/w "Inside" (Demo)	2021	—	Non-album singles
"Senses Out of Control" b/w "Carnival of Illusion" / "Hope Heaven Loves You"	2022	—	Sonics in the Soul
"Manchester Rain"	2022		Sonics in the Soul
"Queen of the Scene"	2026	—	Attitude Adjustment
"Poetic Machine Gun"	2026		Attitude Adjustment
"—" denotes release did not chart.
