= Sell You Everything 1991–2014 =

Box set by Buzzcocks
- Released: 29 May 2020
- Recorded: 1990–2014
- Genre: Pop-punk
- Length: 8:08:45
- Label: Cherry Red
- Producers: Buzzcocks; Ralph P. Ruppert; Neill King; Tony Barber; David M. Allen

Buzzcocks chronology
The Way (2014)	Sell You Everything 1991–2014 (2020)	Late For the Train: Live and in Session 1989–2016 (2020)

Sell You Everything 1991–2014 (sometimes listed with the subtitle Albums, Singles, Rarities, Unreleased) is an eight-CD box set by English rock band Buzzcocks, released on 29 May 2020 by Cherry Red Records. It compiles the band's post-reformation years, containing all their studio albums: Trade Test Transmissions (1993), All Set (1996), Modern (1999), Buzzcocks (2003), Flat-Pack Philosophy (2006), and The Way (2014). It also includes A Different Compilation (2011) – featuring re-recorded interpretations of classic Buzzcocks songs – and the entire 1991 Demo Album, home recordings from guitarist Steve Diggle's archive, demos, and rare B-sides and promotional only tracks.

Omitted are the three bonus tracks on the Japanese version of All Set: "Holding Me Down", "Television World" and "Everyday Sky", although the first is included in re-recorded form as a Flat-Pack Philosophy B-side.

== Critical reception ==
Professional ratings
Review scores
Source	Rating
AllMusic	3.5/5 stars
Classic Rock	3.5/5 stars
Get Ready To Rock!	4/5 stars
Record Collector	4/5 stars

AllMusic called Sell You Everything 1991–2014 "beautifully packaged and assembled with obvious love and care," adding that "its only trouble is it focuses on a period in which [Buzzcocks] were good rather than great in the recording studio, and that makes it a tough sell for anyone outside of truly devoted fans, though those fans will probably be delighted." We Are Cult called the set "exhaustive", writing, "for any Buzzcocks aficionado, [it] contains enough in the way of new material to satisfy anybody's cravings."

At The Barrier described it as a "veritable feast" but felt that "it's easy to get bloated on Buzzcocks and fail to appreciate the gems that surface. All the discs contain a handful of extra tracks although some may pipe up that too much of a good thing can leave one wanting less."

== Track listing ==
Adapted from the box set liner notes, except where noted. Tracks with (*) asterisk are previously unreleased.

=== Disc one – The 1991 Demo Album ===
No.	Title	Writer(s)	Length
1.	"Dreamin'"	Pete Shelley	4:05
2.	"Alive Tonight"	Steve Diggle	3:21
3.	"Never Gonna Give It Up"	Shelley	3:06
4.	"Wallpaper World"	Diggle	3:51
5.	"Successful Street"	Diggle	4:23
6.	"Who'll Help Me to Forget"	Shelley	3:18
7.	"Serious Crime"	Shelley	3:30
8.	"Why Compromise"	Shelley	3:58
9.	"Last to Know"	Shelley	2:44
10.	"Run Away from Home"	Steve Garvey	2:41
11.	"Searching for Your Love"	Shelley	2:59
12.	"Tranquillizer"	Shelley	3:24
13.	"When Love Turns Around You"	Diggle	2:29

Bonus tracks
No.	Title	Writer(s)	Length
14.	"All Over You" (demo) (*)	Shelley	3:16
15.	"Isolation" (demo) (*)	Diggle	3:58
16.	"Trash Away" (demo) (*)	Diggle	3:06
17.	"Inside" (demo) (*)	Diggle	2:52
18.	"Alive Tonight" (EP version)	Diggle	3:51
19.	"Serious Crime" (EP version)	Shelley	3:30
20.	"Last to Know" (EP version)	Shelley	2:57
21.	"Successful Street" (EP version)	Diggle	5:30
Total length:			73:03

Production notes

Recorded at Drone Studios, Manchester, England, November 1990 and February–April 1991. The 1991 Demo Album was originally circulated as Buzzcocks Demo LP on a promotional cassette in 1991. Tracks 14–17 recorded during the 1991 sessions, taken from a cassette. Tracks 18–21 produced by Buzzcocks, released on the Alive Tonight EP, April 1991.

=== Disc two – Trade Test Transmissions (1993) ===
No.	Title	Writer(s)	Length
1.	"Do It"	Shelley	3:23
2.	"Innocent"	Shelley	3:34
3.	"TTT"	Shelley	3:18
4.	"Isolation"	Diggle	3:58
5.	"Smile"	Shelley	2:47
6.	"Last to Know"	Shelley	2:52
7.	"When Love Turns Around"	Diggle	2:25
8.	"Never Gonna Give It Up"	Shelley	2:47
9.	"Energy"	Diggle	3:35
10.	"Palm of Your Hand"	Shelley	3:22
11.	"Alive Tonight"	Diggle	3:48
12.	"Who'll Help Me to Forget?"	Shelley	2:57
13.	"Unthinkable"	Diggle	2:52
14.	"Crystal Night"	Shelley	3:18
15.	"369"	Shelley	3:02

Bonus tracks
No.	Title	Writer(s)	Length
16.	"Inside" (B-side)	Diggle	2:32
17.	"Libertine Angel" (Libertine Angel EP)	Shelley	2:57
18.	"Roll It Over" (Libertine Angel EP)	Diggle	6:08
19.	"Excerpt from "Prison Riot Hostage"" (Libertine Angel EP)	Shelley	1:59
20.	"Somewhere in the World" (studio outtake) (*)	Diggle	2:48
21.	"Energy" (home demo) (*)	Diggle	4:30
22.	"It's Alright" (home demo) (*)	Diggle	2:16
23.	"Take Your Life" (home demo) (*)	Diggle	2:30
24.	"Somewhere in the World" (home demo) (*)	Diggle	3:03
Total length:			76:47

Production notes

Tracks 1–16 produced by Ralph P. Ruppert at Eastcote Studios, London, England, March–April 1993; released June 1993. Tracks 17–19 produced by Buzzcocks at Falconer Studios, London, March 1994; released on the Libertine Angel EP, April 1994. Tracks 21–24 recorded on a home Portastudio by Steve Diggle, taken from a cassette.

=== Disc three – All Set (1996) ===
No.	Title	Writer(s)	Length
1.	"Totally from the Heart"	Shelley	2:45
2.	"Without You"	Shelley	2:59
3.	"Give It to Me"	Shelley	3:22
4.	"Your Love"	Shelley	2:23
5.	"Point of No Return"	Shelley	2:20
6.	"Hold Me Close"	Shelley	4:02
7.	"Kiss 'N' Tell"	Shelley	2:35
8.	"What Am I Supposed to Do"	Diggle	3:22
9.	"Some Kinda Wonderful"	Shelley	2:19
10.	"What You Mean to Me"	Shelley	3:20
11.	"Playing for Time"	Diggle	3:43
12.	"Pariah"	Shelley	3:16
13.	"Back with You"	Diggle	4:12

Bonus tracks
No.	Title	Writer(s)	Length
14.	"Without You" (demo) (*)	Shelley	3:01
15.	"Your Love" (demo) (*)	Shelley	2:12
16.	"Give It to Me" (demo) (*)	Shelley	3:21
17.	"Kiss 'N' Tell" (demo) (*)	Shelley	2:34
Total length:			51:57

Production notes

Produced by Neill King at Fantasy Studios, Berkeley, California, United States, November–December 1995; released May 1996. Tracks 14–17 are working versions taken from a cassette recording.

=== Disc four – Modern (1999) ===
No.	Title	Writer(s)	Length
1.	"Soul on a Rock"	Shelley	4:00
2.	"Rendezvous"	Shelley	3:35
3.	"Speed of Life"	Diggle	4:32
4.	"Thunder of Hearts"	Shelley	2:56
5.	"Why Compromise?"	Shelley	3:32
6.	"Don't Let the Car Crash"	Diggle	4:28
7.	"Runaround"	Shelley	3:27
8.	"Doesn't Mean Anything"	Diggle	2:49
9.	"Phone"	Shelley	3:02
10.	"Under the Sun"	Shelley	3:31
11.	"Turn of the Screw"	Diggle	2:38
12.	"Sneaky"	Shelley	2:20
13.	"Stranger in Your Town"	Diggle	2:25
14.	"Choices"	Shelley	3:31

Bonus tracks
No.	Title	Writer(s)	Length
15.	"Here Come the Nice" (from Long Agos and Worlds Apart – A Tribute to the Small Faces, 1996)	Steve Marriott, Ronnie Lane	2:56
16.	"Autumn Stone" (7" promo single, 1996)	Marriott	4:13
Total length:			54:01

Production notes

Produced by Tony Barber at The Surgery, Barnet, England, June–October 1998; released September 1999. Tracks 15 and 16 produced by Tony Barber, August 1995; track 15 released on the compilation Long Agos and Worlds Apart – A Tribute to the Small Faces, August 1996; track 16 released as a promotional only 7" single under the pseudonym Stevie's Buzz, 1996.

=== Disc five – Buzzcocks (2003) ===
No.	Title	Writer(s)	Length
1.	"Jerk"		2:21
2.	"Keep On"		3:19
3.	"Wake Up Call"	Diggle	3:19
4.	"Friends"		2:57
5.	"Driving You Insane"	Diggle	2:24
6.	"Morning After"		2:34
7.	"Sick City Sometimes"	Diggle	2:59
8.	"Stars"	Shelley, Howard Devoto	2:46
9.	"Certain Move"	Diggle	3:02
10.	"Lester Sands"	Shelley, Devoto	2:47
11.	"Up for the Crack"	Diggle	2:23
12.	"Useless"		4:01

Bonus tracks
No.	Title	Writer(s)	Length
13.	"Don't Come Back" (B-side)	Diggle	2:35
14.	"Never Believe It" (demo; B-side)		3:07
15.	"Paradise" (live; B-side)		2:28
16.	"Oh Shit!" (live; B-side)		2:00
Total length:			45:13

Production notes

Produced by Tony Barber at Southern Studios, London, England, March–August 2002; released March 2003. Track 14 produced by Tony Barber at The Surgery, Barnet, August 1995. Track 15 from live webcast aboard pirate radio ship, September 1999. Track 16 recorded live in Toulouse, France, 2000.

=== Disc six – Flat-Pack Philosophy (2006) ===
No.	Title	Writer(s)	Length
1.	"Flat-Pack Philosophy"	Shelley	3:06
2.	"Wish I Never Loved You"	Shelley	2:38
3.	"Sell You Everything"	Diggle	2:25
4.	"Reconciliation"	Shelley	2:57
5.	"I Don't Exist"	Shelley	2:20
6.	"Soul Survivor"	Diggle	1:41
7.	"God, What Have I Done"	Shelley	2:16
8.	"Credit"	Shelley	3:22
9.	"Big Brother Wheels"	Diggle	2:39
10.	"Dreamin'"	Shelley	2:40
11.	"Sound of a Gun"	Diggle	2:27
12.	"Look at You Now"	Shelley	2:16
13.	"I've Had Enough"	Shelley	2:29
14.	"Between Heaven and Hell"	Diggle	3:16

Bonus tracks
No.	Title	Writer(s)	Length
15.	"See Through You" (B-side)	Diggle	2:36
16.	"Holding Me Down" (B-side)	Diggle	3:36
17.	"Every Day and Every Night" (demo; B-side)	Diggle	3:33
18.	"Don't Matter What You Say" (B-side)	Diggle	2:56
19.	"Orion" (B-side)	Shelley	3:14
20.	"Darker by the Hour" (B-side)	Shelley	1:40
21.	"Love Battery" (live; B-side)	Shelley, Devoto	2:09
22.	"Sixteen" (live; B-side)	Shelley	3:23
Total length:			59:51

Production notes

Produced by Tony Barber at Southern Studios, London, England, 2004–2005; released March 2006. Tracks 15 and 16 engineered by Julian Standen. Track 17 recorded at The Surgery, Barnet, England, 1996 (from the demos for Modern). Track 20 recorded at The Surgery, Barnet, England, 1998 (recorded for the film Last Days of the Post Office). Track 21 recorded live in Eindhoven, Holland, May 2000. Track 22 recorded live in the US, December 2000.

=== Disc seven – A Different Compilation (2011) ===
No.	Title	Writer(s)	Length
1.	"Boredom"	Shelley, Devoto	2:50
2.	"Fast Cars"	Shelley, Devoto, Diggle	2:10
3.	"I Don't Mind"	Shelley	2:16
4.	"Autonomy"	Diggle	3:39
5.	"Get On Our Own"	Shelley	2:16
6.	"Whatever Happened To?"	Shelley, Alan Dial	2:08
7.	"When Love Turns Around You"	Diggle	2:38
8.	"Why She's a Girl From the Chainstore"	Diggle	2:34
9.	"Why Can't I Touch It?"	Shelley, Diggle, Garvey, John Maher	4:14
10.	"Alive Tonight"	Diggle	3:40
11.	"I Don't Know What to Do with My Life"	Shelley	2:37
12.	"You Say You Don't Love Me"	Shelley	2:39
13.	"Turn of the Screw"	Diggle	2:31
14.	"Noise Annoys"	Shelley	2:58
15.	"Breakdown"	Shelley, Devoto	2:03
16.	"Promises"	Shelley, Diggle	1:58
17.	"Love You More"	Shelley	1:47
18.	"What Do I Get?"	Shelley	2:49
19.	"Harmony in My Head"	Diggle	3:05
20.	"Oh Shit!"	Shelley	1:33
21.	"Ever Fallen in Love (With Someone You Shouldn't've)"	Shelley	2:41
22.	"Orgasm Addict"	Shelley, Devoto	2:06
23.	"I Believe"	Shelley	7:22
24.	"Love Is Lies"	Diggle	3:19
Total length:			68:05

Production notes

Produced by David M. Allen and Buzzcocks.

=== Disc-eight – The Way (2014) ===
No.	Title	Writer(s)	Length
1.	"Keep On Believing"	Shelley	2:54
2.	"People Are Strange Machines"	Diggle	3:31
3.	"The Way"	Shelley	3:12
4.	"In the Back"	Diggle	3:41
5.	"Virtually Real"	Shelley	3:35
6.	"Third Dimension"	Diggle	4:33
7.	"Out of the Blue"	Shelley	3:47
8.	"Chasing Rainbows" / "Modern Times"	Diggle	3:21
9.	"It's Not You"	Shelley, Danny Farrant	2:42
10.	"Saving Yourself"	Diggle	5:03

Bonus tracks
No.	Title	Writer(s)	Length
11.	"Generation Suicide" (bonus outtake)	Diggle	3:46
12.	"Dream On Baby" (bonus outtake)	Diggle	6:21
13.	"Happen" (bonus outtake)	Shelley	2:34
14.	"Disappointment" (bonus outtake)	Shelley	2:12
15.	"In the Back" (home demo) (*)	Diggle	4:02
16.	"Dancing at Dawn" (home demo) (*)	Diggle	2:52
17.	"Can You Dig Me?" (home demo) (*)	Diggle	3:31
Total length:			61:23

Production notes

Produced by David M. Allen and Buzzcocks at New Rose Studios and Great Eastern Studios, London, England; released May 2014. Tracks 11–14 released as bonus tracks for pledgers during The Way PledgeMusic campaign. Tracks 15–17 recorded on a home Portastudio by Steve Diggle, taken from a cassette recording.

== Personnel ==
Buzzcocks

- Pete Shelley – vocals, guitar
- Steve Diggle – vocals, guitar
- Steve Garvey – bass (The 1991 Demo Album)
- Mike Joyce – drums (The 1991 Demo Album)
- Tony Barber – bass (Trade Test Transmissions–Flat-Pack Philosophy); guitar, keyboards and drums ("Darker by the Hour")
- Philip Barker – drums (Trade Test Transmissions–Flat-Pack Philosophy)
- Chris Remmington – bass (A Different Compilation, The Way)
- Danny Farrant – drums (A Different Compilation, The Way)

Additional musicians

- Lydia – brass (Libertine Angel EP)
- Nick Wollage – brass (Libertine Angel EP)
- Simon Astridge – brass (Libertine Angel EP)
- Neill King – piano (All Set)
- Jim Pugh – additional keyboards (All Set)

Technical (box set)

- Ra Reed – box set producer
- John Reed – box set producer
- Pat Gilbert – sleevenotes
- Oli Hemingway – masters and audio restoration
- Keith Davey – design
