= All Set =

Studio album by Buzzcocks
- Released: 14 May 1996
- Recorded: November 1995
- Studios: Fantasy, Berkeley, California
- Genre: Pop-punk
- Length: 40:43
- Label: I.R.S.
- Producer: Neill King

Buzzcocks chronology
Trade Test Transmissions (1993)	All Set (1996)	Modern (1999)

Singles from All Set
- 1. "Totally from the Heart" Released: July 1996

All Set is the fifth studio album by English pop-punk band Buzzcocks. After standardising their line-up of vocalists and guitarists Pete Shelley and Steve Diggle, bassist Tony Barber, and drummer Phil Barker for the band's previous album Trade Test Transmissions (1993), the band's first record since their reunion in 1989, the band toured relentlessly which inspired the band–especially Shelley–to create a new album. Hiring longtime punk rock producer Neill King to produce and engineer All Set, the band recorded in Fantasy Studios, Berkeley, California, a studio where then-huge pop-punk bands like Green Day, to whom Buzzcocks had been a big influence, had recently recorded music engineered by King.

The album is a departure from the band's earlier material, retaining a pop-punk style but adding regular unusual arrangements and instruments in many songs, with varying songs including a Hammond organ, quirky rhythms, strings and synths. Changes are especially evident in the album's three songs written by Diggle, who had written and recorded three further songs with the band for the album but which were accidentally left off the album when it was handed for publishing, although the unreleased songs were released as bonus tracks in the Japanese release. As such, All Set leans heavily onto Shelley's material. Barker's drumming style was said to show more flair, whilst the record is said to "reflect their maturity and approach to relationships that the early singles just couldn't."

The album was released in May 1996 by I.R.S. Records in most markets, a label the band signed to in order for their music to be better distributed. However, the label closed two months after the album's release, making All Set the label's last release, and abruptly ending the album's promotion. As such, it was not a commercial success. However, it was a critical success, with critics praising the manic and melodic juxtaposition, memorability of its songs and vitality. Music journalist Colin Larkin said the album "confirmed the Buzzcocks' latter-day renaissance." A remastered version of All Set was released in the box set Classic Album Series in 2014.

== Background and recording ==
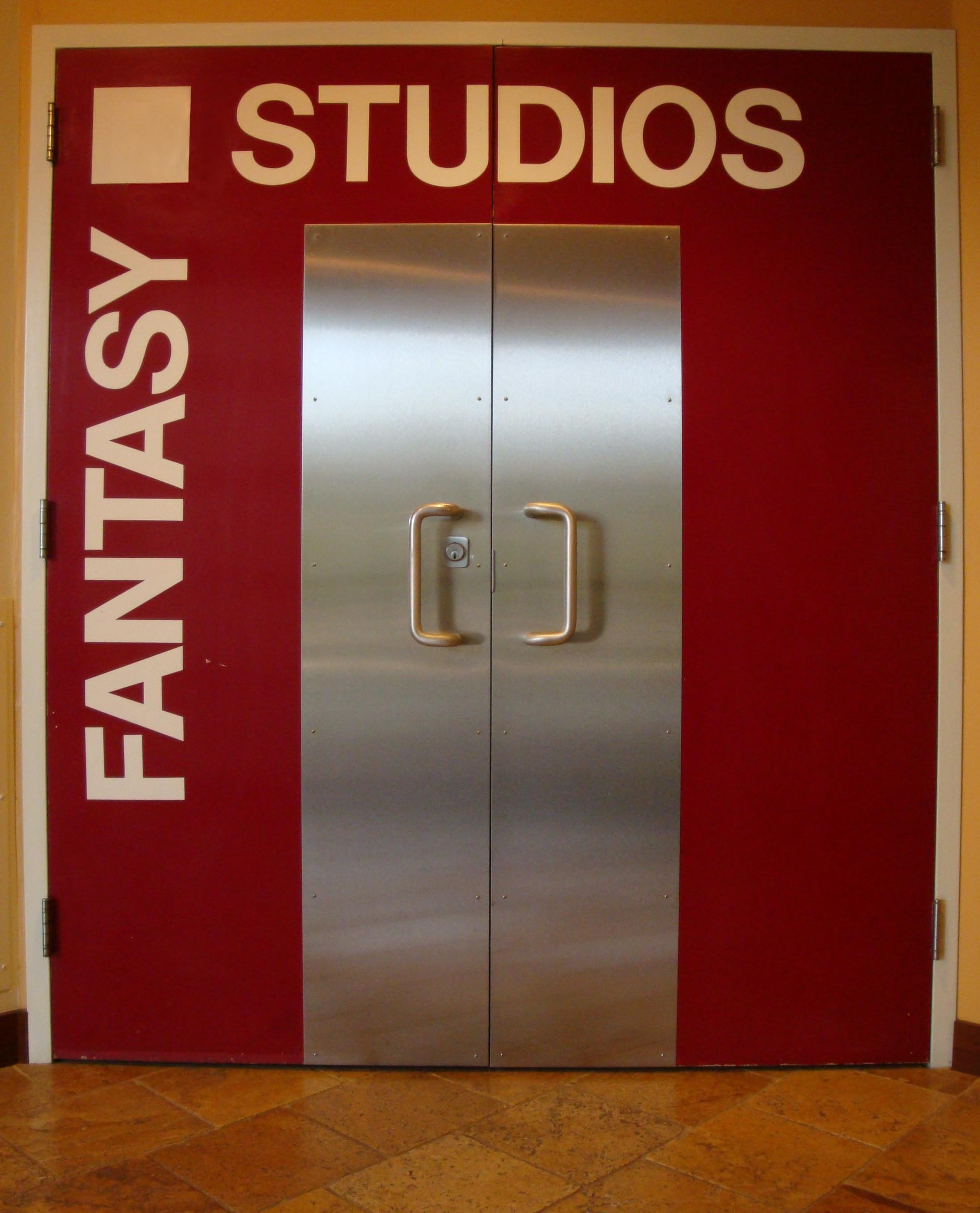
All Set was recorded at Fantasy Studios, Berkeley.

After their prolific career in the late 1970s, punk rock/pop-punk band the Buzzocks reformed in 1989 for a tour of the United States, although by 1990 the reunion had become permanent. The group's rhythm section, Steve Garvey (bass) and John Maher (drums) soon left the band, both of whom were content to continue their other lines of work, and after a brief stint with former Smiths drummer Mike Joyce, the group's standardised line up became vocalists and guitarists Pete Shelley and Steve Diggle, bassist Tony Barber, and drummer Phil Barker. The band recorded their first album in 14 years, Trade Test Transmissions (1993), a return to the band's original pop-punk sound and a departure from the experimental music Shelly and Diggle had recorded away from the Buzzcocks. Although it was a critical success, it was not a commercial one despite the huge surge in popularity for pop-punk at the same time, but regardless, the band toured relentlessly worldwide following its release.

Touring the world playing their durable old songs had put the group−especially Pete Shelley−in the same framework for new songs. As such, they began work on the new album All Set in 1995, and hired longtime English punk rock producer Neill King to produce the album. According to music journalist Ned Raggett, "hooking up with Neill King as producer for All Set was an amusing turn on the part of the Buzzcocks, given that King had engineered Dookie [a few years earlier], the breakthrough album from open Buzzcocks worshippers Green Day." Buzzcocks felt that "a little acknowledgement back" to Green Day was in order, even going so far as to record All Set at Fantasy Studios in Green Day's hometown of Berkeley, California. Nonetheless, the Buzzcocks were "far from trying to capture the MTV audience with a variation on "Basket Case". King not only produced All Set but engineered it at the same studio, and played piano on the album. King's acclaimed producing and engineering work on the album lead to one critic noting that "things haven't sounded this crisp and clear for the band even since the late '70s." Frank Rinello is credited in the album sleeve as "assisting" the recording, whilst Jim Push is credited for "additional keyboards."

The final album was mostly written by Shelley, including Your Love and Give it to Me who Shelley had recorded and released in 1988 as Zip, although three songs were written by Diggle. When asked why he didn't contribute as many songs on All Set as he had on the band's previous releases, Diggle explained that the band had actually recorded six of his contributions, but the songs were delivered too late to the band's record label I.R.S. Records. Diggle explained "they pressed up the album thinking that was it and when the album came out I said, 'what the fuck's happened here? You missed three songs?' The three missing songs were soon released a month later as bonus tracks on the Japanese edition, since the band had a different record label deal in Japan, where they were signed to Real Cool Records instead. In the words of Ronnie Dannelley of Pop Culture Press, the "humorous incident" would have sent "collectors scrambling to find the Japanese pressing."

== Music ==
"This recording is Fun with a capital "F". Bouncy. And there are some melodic gems among the more manic cuts: "Back With You" and "Hold Me Close" standing out as Buzzcocks classics. "Totally From The Heart" has Pete at his frantic best and "Without You" is nothing like the Harry Nilsson classic of the same name."

— Ali Sinclair of Consumable Online

Although All Set retains the band's traditional pop-punk style, the band experiment "here and there" on the album with atypical instruments and arrangements. Ned Raggett of Allmusic described the experiments as "hints of trying to breathe once again beyond the basic formula." The inclusion of a Hammond organ provides "a nice extra touch here and there," such as on the lower-key groove of "Hold Me Close," one of Shelley's tenderer love songs, while Diggle "pulls off a rock-of-the-gods epic start" for "Playing for Time." The concluding two songs have both been noted for having "something to them in particular"−"Pariah" has a quirky rhythm crunch to it à la "Sixteen," while Diggle's "Back With You" starts off with an acoustic guitar and turns into a string-synth-swept declaration of love. Nonetheless, besides the unusual touches, Raggett said its "generally effective business as usual" Ali Sinclair of Consumable Online said that although listeners might assume the band to have mellowed out, they "still sound like the Beatles overdosed on caffeine - or more."

On All Set, the band's drummer Phil Barker was noted as "in particular showing more individual flashes and flair than before," whilst Shelley and Diggle "throw in a couple of almost mainstream guitar solos along the way, but otherwise are as dedicated as always to the virtues of high-volume, brisk poppiness." Some songs on All Set seem to borrow whole guitar licks from older songs by the band, such as the European siren lick from "Harmony in My Head" that resurfaces on "Point of No Return", but, in the words of Roger Catlin, "these aren't middle-age musicians trying to pass for callow youth," as some of the songs on the album "reflect their maturity and approach to relationships that the early singles just couldn't." The sound of the band changes considerably in songs written by Steve Diggle, who according to Catlin "sounds a bit like Pete Townshend when he doesn't sound like Peter Frampton. (The band in its current incarnation is rounded out by a newcomer rhythm section, which figures.)" The New York Times said that the album contains "sing-along odes to love's confusion in the tradition of older Buzzcocks songs."

== Release and promotion ==
By the time the album was released, the band's line-up had been their longest lasting so far, and the group had now been around longer since their 1989 reunion than they had when they originally existed in the late 1970s. For the release of All Set, the band changed record labels to I.R.S. Records, as the band thought that the two labels they were signed to at the time, Castle Records (for UK distribution) and Caroline Records (for US distribution), were not far reaching enough. When asked about the change of label to I.R.S., Diggle explained that "we thought it would be a better move, you know, better distribution. Some people had problems finding Trade Test." All Set was released worldwide in May 1996 by I.R.S. Records, except in Japan where it was released by Real Cool Records instead on 21 June 1996. In the United Kingdom, it was released on 6 May as a CD and limited edition LP, whilst in the United States it was released on 14 May. The album title, All Set, comes from an often repeated phrase from an American waitress.

However, the band had only spent two months publicity for the album before I.R.S. Records suddenly closed on 11 July 1996, making All Set the last release on the label. Shelley recalled "we were on tour and all the people we were working with suddenly got the phone call that there's no record company." He recalled that "Miles Goldham [sic] was trying to buy back his share from EMI/IRS, and he had backers in place, but then they decided, oh you can't have the R.E.M. stuff. As a result of that his backers fell through. So, he just threw his hands up in despair. He was left with no option but to close down the company." As such, it left the band without a record label and, as a journalist from Ear Candy Mag recalled it, the album suffered for "a lack of promotion" and it was not a commercial success, not appearing in any country's national chart, although steady sales from the supporting tour upheld its popularity. The administration of the label was sudden, as at the time of the release of the album, Diggle had explained in an interview that "we signed for a couple of albums. We'll probably be touring the rest of this year, then a new album next year." The folding of I.R.S. Records meant that the band did not release a second album the following year; the band eventually released a new album, Modern, three years after on Go-Kart Records. Although All Set has never been re-issued or re-released by itself, a remastered version was included as the fifth and final disc in Classic Album Series, a box set released by Parlophone on 20 June 2014 containing five of the band's albums that were deemed to be "classics".

The album was released during a popular resurgence for punk rock, with older punk bands reuniting and newer ones receiving international exposure, and All Set has been seen as exemplifying the period. In his review of All Set, Roger Catlin of the Hartford Courant proclaimed "what an unusual summer we're having. The Sex Pistols, the Misfits and the Dictators are on reunion tours, and there are new albums from Patti Smith, the Specials and the Buzzcocks. What year is this exactly?" After Ear Candy Mag pointed out that popular acts such as Oasis, Green Day and Rancid mixed punk rock and pop as was the Buzzcocks style, Diggle said that he thought the revival was "exciting, it brings guitar back. In Britain there's a lot more guitar bands happening." When asked whether he felt that "these new groups are stealing the Buzzcocks' thunder for doing what the Buzzcocks were doing 20 years ago," Diggle replied "Well, there's a hint of that, but you think maybe it will develop. Everybody takes a starting point at some time." On 23 June 1996, Buzzcocks even opened the Sex Pistols' reunion tour, Filthy Lucre Tour, at Finsbury Park.

== Reception ==
Professional ratings
Review scores
Source	Rating
AllMusic	4/5 stars
Robert Christgau	(3-star Honorable Mention)
Entertainment Weekly	B
PopMatters	7/10

The album was released to a positive reception from music critics. Ned Raggett of AllMusic said "the quartet here sounds like the Buzzcocks, if again essentially the pop-friendlier side of the band." He said that "things haven't sounded this crisp and clear for the band even since the late '70s" and said the album was "generally effective business as usual." Robert Christgau gave the album a three-star honorable mention, signifying "an enjoyable effort consumers attuned to its overriding aesthetic or individual vision may well treasure." His review of the album quipped "love life much smoother, music summat." Roger Catlin of Hartford Courant was favourable and said that "at any rate, the songs from All Set (a title that comes from the oft-repeated phrase used by American waitresses), won't sound out of place amid the classics when the Buzzcocks headline a show Sunday at Toad's Place in New Haven." Ali Sinclair of Consumable Online published a positive review and said the band "sound just as lively as they did back in the mid-seventies. The popular side of punk... less Vicious than Sid, more friendly than the Stranglers - music for pogoing!" Trouser Press said All Set was another album of "memorable originals with familiar virtues," singling out the songs "Totally from the Heart," "Hold Me Close," "Point of No Return" and "Back with You" as highlights.

A journalist from Ear Candy Mag said that All Set was "incredibly strong." Ronnie Dannelley of Pop Culture Press called it "a solid follow-up to Trade Test" and said it showed the band "avoiding the sophomore slump." Whilst interviewing Diggle, a reviewer for San Francisco Bay Area Concerts said he had been listening to All Set and noted "it feels just as vital to me as Singles Going Steady" [the band's most acclaimed album]. He described All Set as "part of this larger thing but at the same time too it’s always these individual evolutions." He said that although All Set, Love Bites (1978) and Flat-Pack Philosophy (2006) span some 30 years, "they all sound incredible."

In his 2012 book The Anarchy Tour, music writer Mick O'Shea said that alongside the band's other post-reunion albums, All Set "served to affirm that Buzzcocks could still appeal to a global audience while still remaining true to their original ideals." It has been said that All Set "reaffirmed Buzzcocks' position as a band deeply loved and revered by a global audience, simultaneously true to their original ideals and open to new ideas."

== Track listing ==
All songs written and composed by Pete Shelley, except as noted.

No.	Title	Writer(s)	Length
1.	"Totally from the Heart"		2:45
2.	"Without You"		2:59
3.	"Give It to Me"		3:22
4.	"Your Love"		2:23
5.	"Point of No Return"		2:20
6.	"Hold Me Close"		4:02
7.	"Kiss 'n' Tell"		2:35
8.	"What Am I Supposed to Do"	Steve Diggle	3:22
9.	"Some Kinda Wonderful"		2:19
10.	"What You Mean to Me"		3:20
11.	"Playing for Time"	Diggle	3:43
12.	"Pariah"		3:16
13.	"Back with You"	Diggle	4:12

Japanese bonus tracks
No.	Title	Writer(s)	Length
14.	"Holding Me Down"	Diggle	3:53
15.	"Television World"	Diggle	3:50
16.	"Everyday Sky"	Diggle	3:40

== Personnel ==
Adapted from the album liner notes.

Buzzcocks

- Pete Shelley – guitar, vocals
- Steve Diggle – guitar, vocals
- Tony Barber – bass, guitar
- Philip Barker – drums, percussion

Additional musicians

- Neill King – piano
- Jim Push – additional keyboards

Technical

- Neill King – production, engineering, mixing
- Frank Rinello – assisting engineering
