= The High =

English rock group from Manchester

- Origin: Manchester, England
- Genres: Alternative rock, psychedelic rock, Madchester, baggy, jangle pop
- Years active: 1989–1993, 2015–present
- Labels: London
- Members: Andy Couzens; John Matthews; Tony Meehan; Richard Thomas; Scott Parkinson
- Past members: Simon Davies; Chris Goodwin; Jack Couzens

The High are an English rock group from Manchester, whose sound combines alternative rock with a 1960s pop/psychedelic guitar sound.

== History ==
The band was formed in 1989 by former Turning Blue singer John Matthews, along with former Buzzcocks F.O.C. members Andy Couzens (guitar, also formerly of The Stone Roses and pre-Roses bands The Patrol and Waterfront), Simon Davies (bass), and drummer Chris Goodwin (also formerly of the Waterfront as well as the Inspiral Carpets), when Steve Diggle left Buzzcocks F.O.C. to reform the Buzzcocks.

They were signed by London Records (who would sign a number of other baggy/Madchester acts such as Camden's Flowered Up around the same time), who put out The High's debut album in 1990 (the album, Somewhere Soon, peaked at number 59 in the UK Albums Chart). The band also had three minor UK Singles Chart hits in 1990 before breaking into the top 30 in 1991 with a revamped version of their debut single, the Martin Hannett-produced "Box Set Go". However, London Records was fined £50,000 by the BPI in 1991, for suspected chart hyping in the UK Singles Chart in regards to their single "More", with the suspicion that their chart position may have been bought by the record company and not due to fans purchasing the record. In addition to this, the Madchester scene started to lose favour with the critics (who had moved on to covering new forms of dance music and the Seattle grunge scene) and so the band's later releases failed to chart. The band split up in 1993.

John Matthews and Chris Goodwin went on to form the group One Summer, with Manchester musicians Stephen Fitzpatrick (guitar) and Carl Wolstenholme (bass). One Summer worked with Factory Records group A Certain Ratio and recorded a demo for the label before it went into administration.

== Reformation ==
The High reformed in early 2015, with John Matthews and Andy Couzens the only original members; they are joined by Tony Meehan (bass), Jack Couzens (drums), and Richard Thomas (keyboards).

The new line-up headlined at the Gigantic Festival in Manchester at the Academy 2 on 23 May 2015, as their comeback gig and have played a number of headline shows since.

== Recent work ==
The band has also been writing and recording new material, and in June 2016 released their first single in 25 years, "Kiss the Sun" on their own label Thin Line Productions.

Warner Brothers re-released their debut album Somewhere Soon in June 2016, and a long-awaited album was due for release in early 2017.

In 2016, new drummer Jack Couzens left due to schedule clashes and was succeeded by Scott Parkinson.

The High have recently appeared on Jon Savage's compilation, Perfect Motion - Jon Savage's Secret History of Second-Wave Psychedelia 1988-93.

In 2020 The High released The Martin Hannett Sessions, a collection of previously unreleased demos, as part of Record Store Day.

== Discography ==
=== Albums ===
Year	Album	Label	UK
1990	Somewhere Soon	London Records	59
1992	Hype	London Records	—
2020	The Martin Hannett Sessions	Vinyl Revival	—
"—" denotes releases that did not chart.

=== Singles ===
Year	Single	
Year	Single	UK
1990	"Box Set Go"	28
1990	"Up and Down"	53
1990	"Take Your Time"	56
1991	"More..."	67
1992	"Better Left Untold"	—
1993	"Sweet Liberty"	—
"—" denotes releases that did not chart.
