= The Best of Steve Diggle and Flag of Convenience – The Secret Public Years 1981–1989 =

1994 compilation

Greatest hits album by Steve Diggle and Flag of Convenience
- Released: February 1994
- Recorded: 1981–1989
- Genres: Rock; new wave; punk rock
- Length: 79:03
- Label: Anagram
- Producers: Steve Diggle; Flag of Convenience; Gary Hamer; Hugh Murphy; Martin Hannett

Steve Diggle and Flag of Convenience chronology
Heated and Rising (EP) (1993)	The Best of Steve Diggle and Flag of Convenience – The Secret Public Years 1981–1989 (1994)	Here's One I Made Earlier – Best of Steve Diggle, Flag of Convenience, F.O.C. and Buzzcocks F.O.C. (1995)

The Best of Steve Diggle and Flag of Convenience – The Secret Public Years 1981–1989 is a CD compilation of Buzzcocks' Steve Diggle's first solo days and his subsequent band, Flag of Convenience, which compiles his post-Buzzcocks songs from 1981 to 1989, during the years Buzzcocks remained disbanded. It was released in 1994 in the UK on Anagram Records.

== Critical reception ==
Professional ratings
Review scores
Source	Rating
AllMusic	3/5 stars

AllMusic wrote, "It's not that the first 13 tracks, from '81–'86, aren't of good quality – they are. But it's the final eight songs that should have led-off here, in establishing Diggle as one of the most important and overlooked artists in all of Britain during the '80s."

== Track listing ==
All tracks are written by Steve Diggle and credited to Flag of Convenience; except where indicated.

1. "Shut Out the Light" – 2:54 (Steve Diggle)
2. "50 Years of Comparative Wealth" – 3:45 (Steve Diggle)
3. "Here Comes the Fire Brigade" – 3:56 (Steve Diggle)
4. "Life on the Telephone" – 5:24
5. "Picking Up on Audio Sound" – 3:24
6. "Other Mans Sin" – 4:48 (Note: Titled "The Other Man's Sin" on original single release.)
7. "Men from the City" – 4:54
8. "Who Is Innocent" – 3:54
9. "Drift Away" – 3:49
10. "Change" – 2:49
11. "Longest Life" – 3:26
12. "The Arrow Has Come" – 3:27
13. "Keep on Pushing" (live) – 4:10
14. "Pictures in My Mind" – 2:42
15. "Last Train to Safety" – 4:20
16. "Exiles" – 3:04
17. "Can't Stop the World" – 2:06
18. "Shot Down with a Gun" – 4:16 (Note: Titled "Shot Down with Your Gun" on original EP release.)
19. "Tragedy in Market Street" – 4:14
20. "Tomorrow's Sunset" – 4:06 (Note: Titled "Sunset" on original single release.) (Buzzcocks F.O.C.)
21. "Life with the Lions" – 3:35 (Buzzcocks F.O.C.)

Origin

- Tracks 1–3 from 50 Years of Comparative Wealth EP, 1981.
- Tracks 4–6 from "Life on the Telephone" single, 1982
- Tracks 7–12 from The Big Secret, 1984
- Track 13 from "New House" single, 1986
- Track 14 from Northwest Skyline, 1987
- Track 15 from "Last Train to Safety" EP, 1987
- Tracks 16–19 from Exiles EP, 1988
- Tracks 20–21 from "Tomorrow's Sunset" single, 1989

== Personnel ==
Credits adapted from the album liner notes, except where noted.

Musicians

- Steve Diggle – vocals, guitar, keyboards
- John Maher – drums (1–12)
- Steve Garvey – bass (1–3)
- Mark Burke – guitar (7–12)
- Steve Mac – guitar (13)
- Gaz Connor – guitar (16–19)
- Andy Couzens – guitar (20–21)
- David Farrow – bass (4–6)
- Gary Hamer – bass (7–21)
- John Caine – drums (13–15)
- Chris Godwin – drums (16–21)
- Dave "D.P." Prescott – keyboards (4–6)
- Dean Sumner – keyboards (13)

Technical

- Steve Diggle – producer (1–3, 7–19)
- Flag of Convenience – producer (4–6)
- Hugh Murphy – producer (4–6)
- Gary Hamer – producer (13–19)
- Martin Hannett – producer (20–21)
