= Sonics in the Soul =

Studio album by Buzzcocks
- Released: 23 September 2022
- Studio: Studio 7, London
- Genres: Pop-punk; power pop
- Length: 35:29
- Label: Cherry Red
- Producers: Laurence Loveless; Steve Diggle

Buzzcocks chronology
The Way (2014)	Sonics in the Soul (2022)	Attitude Adjustment (2026)

Singles from Sonics in the Soul
- 1. "Senses Out of Control" Released: 29 April 2022; 2. "Manchester Rain" Released: 2 September 2022

Sonics in the Soul is the tenth studio album by English punk rock band Buzzcocks, released on 23 September 2022 by Cherry Red Records. It is their first studio album since 2014's The Way and their first album without founding member Pete Shelley, who died in 2018.

== Background ==
After the death of founding member Pete Shelley in December 2018, Buzzcocks released the single "Gotta Get Better" in February 2020 with guitarist Steve Diggle taking on sole songwriting and lead vocalist duties. The Senses Out of Control EP, featuring the tracks "Senses Out of Control", "Carnival of Illusion" and "Hope Heaven Loves You", was released in April 2022, with only the title track making Sonics in the Soul.

Largely written and recorded during the COVID-19 pandemic of 2020–2021, the album was recorded at co-producer Laurence Loveless' Studio 7 in London.

"Manchester Rain" was released as the album's second single on 2 September, three weeks before the release of the album.

== Reception ==
Professional ratings
Review scores
Source	Rating
AllMusic	3.5/5 stars
Classic Rock	4/5 stars
God Is in the TV	8/10
IPA Music	8/10
ThePunkSite.com	3/5 stars
Uncut	3.5/5 stars

Sonics in the Soul received mostly positive reviews upon release. Uncut noted the absence of Pete Shelley's "unique vocal", which they felt is irreplaceable, writing that Diggle has written songs "which sit comfortably within his range, and if there are moments when you find yourself wistfully imagining Shelley singing them, that's testament to their quality." They concluded that "Diggle has brought an unexpectedly emotional, often beautifully elegiac quality that makes Sonics in the Soul relevant and relatable."

AllMusic wrote that Sonics in the Soul "doesn't really sound like a Buzzcocks LP, at least not as we've known them. The songs are short and hooky and played with strength and a certain degree of speed, which suits the group's pedigree, but without Shelley's very distinctive melodies and lyrics that split the difference between wit and anxiety, this sounds like a Steve Diggle album ... That said, if it seems like a Steve Diggle album rather than the Buzzcocks, it's a very good Steve Diggle album."

Power Pop News felt the album contains "undeniably hooky choruses" with "all the energy of the band in it's [sic] heyday despite the slightly more polished sound." Classic Rock called it "a riot from start to finish," saying the band sounded "rebooted and reinvigorated."

Louder Than War was less positive, writing, "By any standards, it's not a great album. It sounds like a Manchester guitar band going thru the motions. ... The tunes are 'OK' at best and the playing pretty pedestrian for pacey pop/rock ... this is now a one-songwriter band rather than having two – and that is why it's a weak(er) album."

== Track listing ==
All tracks are written by Steve Diggle.

No.	Title	Length
1.	"Senses Out of Control"	2:35
2.	"Manchester Rain"	2:38
3.	"You've Changed Everything Now"	2:57
4.	"Bad Dreams"	3:20
5.	"Nothingless World"	3:01
6.	"Don't Mess with My Brain"	3:09
7.	"Just Got to Let It Go"	2:27
8.	"Everything Is Wrong"	2:56
9.	"Experimental Farm"	3:50
10.	"Can Your Hear Tomorrow"	4:13
11.	"Venus Eyes"	4:22

== Personnel ==
Adapted from the album liner notes.

Buzzcocks

- Steve Diggle – vocals, guitar, keyboards
- Chris Remington – bass
- Danny Farrant – drums

Technical

- Laurence Loveless – producer, mixing
- Steve Diggle – producer, mixing
- Nick Watson – mastering
- Keith Davey – design
- Steve White – photography
- Chris Metzler – photography
- Justin Herring – photography
- Leon Dotmaster – photography
