= The Way (Buzzcocks album) =

Studio album by Buzzcocks
- Released: 1 May 2014
- Studios: New Rose Studios, London; Great Eastern Studios, London
- Genre: Pop-punk
- Length: 36:19
- Labels: PledgeMusic; 1-2-3-4 Go!
- Producers: David M. Allen; Buzzcocks

Buzzcocks chronology
| Flat-Pack Philosophy (2006) | The Way (2014) | Sonics in the Soul (2022) |

Singles from The Way
- 1. "It's Not You" Released: 2014; 2. "In the Back" Released: 2015; 3. "The Way" Released: 2015

The Way is the ninth studio album by English punk rock band Buzzcocks, released digitally on 1 May 2014 via PledgeMusic for pledgers only. It was released by 1-2-3-4 Go! Records as a digital download on 6 October with a physical release on 18 November. It is the first Buzzcocks album with bassist Chris Remington and drummer Danny Farrant, and the final album to feature Pete Shelley before his death in 2018.

== Background ==
The band wrote a message on their website:

We've teamed up with PledgeMusic to give you privileged access to pre-order the new album plus other premium items such as the new album on signed CD or vinyl, the chance to attend a VIP "meet and greet" and even a signed guitar. Each and every one of these items and experiences comes with a high quality digital download of our ninth studio album, plus bonus tracks exclusive to PledgeMusic!

The new album will be officially released to the public in the summer but by pre-ordering you'll get your copy much sooner. Throughout the pre-order period, you'll also get free access to our 'Pledgers Only' updates here on PledgeMusic where you will be able to enjoy a load of exclusive extras, videos from the studio, interviews, demos and much, much more [...] In addition to this, pledges will benefit Teenage Cancer Trust to help them continue the incredible work they do. So as you can see, there are so many great reasons to be a part of our new album from the outset. Thanks again for all your support over the years, Pete, Steve, Danny & Chris Buzzcocks

2014

5% of any money raised after the goal is reached will go to Teenage Cancer Trust.

== Reception ==
Professional ratings
Aggregate scores
| Source | Rating |
|---|---|
| Metacritic | 67/100 |
Review scores
| Source | Rating |
| AllMusic | 3/5 stars |
| Consequence of Sound | B− |
| Entertainment Weekly | B |
| Exclaim! | 6/10 |
| musicOMH | 3/5 stars |
| Paste | 8/10 |
| Pitchfork | 5.8/10 |
| PopMatters | 5/10 |
| Wondering Sound | 3.5/5 stars |

At Metacritic, which assigns a normalized rating out of 100 to reviews from mainstream critics, The Way has an average score of 67 out of 100, which indicates "generally favorable" reception based on 12 reviews.

== Track listing ==
| No. | Title | Writer(s) | Length |
|---|---|---|---|
| 1. | "Keep On Believing" | Pete Shelley | 2:54 |
| 2. | "People Are Strange Machines" | Steve Diggle | 3:31 |
| 3. | "The Way" | Shelley | 3:12 |
| 4. | "In the Back" | Diggle | 3:41 |
| 5. | "Virtually Real" | Shelley | 3:35 |
| 6. | "Third Dimension" | Diggle | 4:33 |
| 7. | "Out of the Blue" | Shelley | 3:47 |
| 8. | "Chasing Rainbows" / "Modern Times" | Diggle | 3:21 |
| 9. | "It's Not You" | Shelley, Danny Farrant | 2:42 |
| 10. | "Saving Yourself" | Diggle | 5:03 |

Bonus tracks available on 'Pledger's Only' version
| No. | Title | Writer(s) | Length |
|---|---|---|---|
| 11. | "Disappointment" (Demo) | Shelley | 2:11 |
| 12. | "Generation Suicide" (Demo) | Diggle | 3:47 |
| 13. | "Happen" (Demo) | Shelley | 2:35 |
| 14. | "Dream On Baby" (Demo) | Diggle | 6:23 |

== Personnel ==
Adapted from the album liner notes.

Buzzcocks

- Pete Shelley – Vocals, guitar
- Steve Diggle – Vocals, guitar
- Chris Remington – Bass
- Danny Farrant – Drums

Technical

- Buzzcocks – Producer
- David M. Allen – Producer, engineer (New Rose Studios), mixing
- Nathaniel Kemp-Hall – Assistant engineer (New Rose Studios), mixing
- Sveinn Jonsson – Engineer (Great Eastern Studios), mixing
- Mazen Murad – Mastering
- Leon Seesix (credited as "Dotmasters") – Artwork
- Joe Giacomet – Layout, photography
- Ian Rook – Live photography
