= Attitude Adjustment (Buzzcocks album) =

Studio album by Buzzcocks
- Released: 30 January 2026
- Recorded: January 2025
- Studio: Studio 7 (London)
- Genre: Power pop; punk rock
- Length: 43:11
- Label: Cherry Red
- Producer: Lawrence Loveless; Steve Diggle

Buzzcocks chronology
Sonics in the Soul (2022)	Attitude Adjustment (2026)

Singles from Attitude Adjustment
- 1. "Queen of the Scene" Released: 28 November 2025; 2. "Poetic Machine Gun" Released: 16 January 2026

Attitude Adjustment is the eleventh studio album by the English punk rock band Buzzcocks, released on 30 January 2026 by Cherry Red Records and produced by Lawrence Loveless and Steve Diggle.

== Background and recording ==
Following Sonics in the Soul (2022), their first without Pete Shelley following his death in 2018, the band recorded Attitude Adjustment in January 2025 at the same studio, London's Studio 7. The album consists of the same lineup as their previous album, including Steve Diggle on vocals, guitars, keyboards, and songwriting duties, Chris Remington on bass, and Danny Farrant on drums. Diggle described Attitude Adjustment as "punk rock with a Motown vibe".

== Singles and release ==
Attitude Adjustment was led by two singles: "Queen of the Scene" on 28 November 2025 and "Poetic Machine Gun" on 16 January 2026. The album subsequently released on 30 January via Cherry Red Records, charting on the UK Independent and Scottish Albums Charts at no. 24 and no. 27, respectively.

== Critical reception ==
Professional ratings
Aggregate scores
Source	Rating
Metacritic	70/100
Review scores
Source	Rating
AllMusic	3/5 stars
Buzz Magazine	4/5 stars
Clash	8/10
Classic Rock	7/10
Mojo	3/5 stars
Record Collector	4/5 stars
Spectrum Culture	65%
Spill Magazine	4/5 stars
Uncut	3.5/5 stars

According to the review aggregator Metacritic, Attitude Adjustment received "generally favorable reviews" based on a weighted average score of 70 out of 100 from 6 critic scores.

== Track listing ==
All tracks are written by Steve Diggle.

Attitude Adjustment track listing
No.	Title	Length
1.	"Queen of the Scene"	2:59
2.	"Games"	3:12
3.	"Seeing Daylight"	3:40
4.	"Poetic Machine Gun"	2:34
5.	"Tear of a Golden Girl"	2:31
6.	"Heavy Streets"	4:01
7.	"One of the Universe, Pt. 1"	0:55
8.	"All Gone to War"	2:41
9.	"One of the Universe, Pt. 2"	0:55
10.	"Jesus at the Wheel"	3:33
11.	"Just a Dream I Followed"	3:43
12.	"Feeling Uptight"	4:35
13.	"Break That Ball and Chain"	3:40
14.	"The Greatest of Them All"	4:05
Total length:		43:11

== Personnel ==
Credits are adapted from the vinyl liner notes.

=== Buzzcocks ===
- Steve Diggle – vocals, guitar, keyboards, production, mixing
- Chris Remmington – bass
- Danny Farrant – drums

=== Additional contributors ===
- Lawrence Loveless – production, mixing
- Geoff Pesche – mastering at Abbey Road Studios, London
- Ron Lyon – front cover photo, band photographs
- Steve White – band photographs
- Malcolm Garrett, Images&Co – design

== Charts ==
Chart performance for Attitude Adjustment
Chart (2026)	Peak position
French Rock & Metal Albums (SNEP)	99
Scottish Albums (OCC)	27
UK Independent Albums (OCC)	24
