= 50 Years of Comparative Wealth E.P. =

EP by Steve Diggle
- Released: February 28, 1981
- Recorded: August 19–21, 1980
- Studio: Cargo Studios, Rochdale
- Genre: Alternative rock, punk rock, new wave
- Label: Liberty
- Producer: Steve Diggle

Steve Diggle chronology
50 Years of Comparative Wealth E.P. (1981)	Heated and Rising (1993)

50 Years of Comparative Wealth E.P. was a 1981 7-inch EP released by Steve Diggle of Buzzcocks. This was his first disc released in his solo career and without Buzzcocks, who by those days were disbanding (although bassist Steve Garvey and drummer John Maher, both also from the band, remained with Diggle). Shortly afterwards Garvey dedicated to his proper projects, with his band Motivation, while Diggle and Maher formed punk band Flag of Convenience, but Maher also left Diggle after some releases.

== Track listing ==
All songs were written by Steve Diggle

=== A-side ===
1. "Shut Out the Light (Rothko)"

=== B-side ===
1. "Fifty Years of Comparative Wealth"
2. "Here Comes the Fire Brigade (Riot)"

== Personnel ==
- Steve Diggle – vocals, guitar, keyboards
- Steve Garvey – bass
- John Maher – drums

Technical

- John Brierley – engineer
- Philip Diggle – cover art
