= Operator's Manual: Buzzcocks Best =

Operators Manual

Compilation album by Buzzcocks
- Released: 12 November 1991
- Recorded: 1976−1979
- Genre: Punk rock
- Length: 78:18
- Label: I.R.S.
- Producer: Martin Rushent

Buzzcocks chronology
A Different Kind of Tension (1979)	Operators Manual (1991)	Trade Test Transmissions (1993)

Professional ratings
Review scores
Source	Rating
AllMusic	4.5/5 stars
Robert Christgau	A
The Encyclopedia of Popular Music	4/5 stars
Q	4/5 stars
The New Rolling Stone Album Guide	4.5/5 stars
Spin Alternative Record Guide	9/10

Operators Manual: Buzzcocks Best is a compilation album by English punk rock band Buzzcocks. It was released in 1991 by I.R.S. Records.

== Critical reception ==
Trouser Press called the album "a concise 25-track career condensation."

== Track listing ==
1. "Orgasm Addict" (Howard Devoto, Pete Shelley) – 2:01
2. "What Do I Get?" (Shelley) – 2:56
3. "I Don't Mind" (Shelley) – 2:19
4. "Autonomy" (Steve Diggle) – 3:50
5. "Fast Cars" (Devoto, Diggle, Shelley) – 2:31
6. "Get on Our Own" (Shelley) – 2:31
7. "Sixteen" (Diggle) – 3:46
8. "Fiction Romance" (Shelley) – 4:34
9. "Love You More" (Shelley) – 1:50
10. "Noise Annoys" (Shelley) – 2:52
11. "Ever Fallen in Love (With Someone You Shouldn't've)" (Shelley) – 2:42
12. "Operators Manual" (Shelley) – 3:34
13. "Nostalgia" (Shelley) – 2:55
14. "Walking Distance" (Garvey) – 2:02
15. "Nothing Left" (Shelley) – 4:28
16. "ESP" (Shelley) – 4:39
17. "Promises" (Diggle, Shelley) – 2:36
18. "Lipstick" (Diggle, Shelley) – 2:38
19. "Everybody's Happy Nowadays" (Shelley)– 3:12
20. "Harmony in My Head" (Diggle) – 3:09
21. "You Say You Don't Love Me" (Shelley) – 2:54
22. "I Don't Know What to Do with My Life" (Shelley) – 2:44
23. "I Believe" (Shelley) – 7:07
24. "Are Everything" (Shelley) – 3:36
25. "Radio Nine" (Shelley) – 0:43

Track 24, "Are Everything", produced by Martin Hannett

== Personnel ==
Buzzcocks

- Pete Shelley – guitar, vocals
- Steve Diggle – guitar
- Steve Garvey – bass
- John Maher – drums
