= Modern (Buzzcocks album) =

Studio album by Buzzcocks
- Released: 7 September 1999
- Recorded: 22 June–13 August 1998, 14 September–13 October 1998
- Studios: The Surgery, Barnet, Herefordshire; mixed at Woodbine Street, Leamington Spa
- Genres: Pop-punk; art punk; new wave; electropunk
- Length: 40:43
- Labels: EMI (UK); Go-Kart (USA)
- Producer: Tony Barber

Buzzcocks chronology
All Set (1996)	Modern (1999)	Buzzcocks (2003)

Singles from Modern
- 1. "Thunder of Hearts" Released: August 1999

Alternative cover
- Alternative US cover

Modern is the sixth studio album by English pop-punk band Buzzcocks. After the critical success of the band's previous album All Set (1996), the band became disillusioned with trying to be a rock band and set out to become more "modern," thus birthing the project. Recording the album in Chipping Barnet with the band's bassist Tony Barber producing, Modern sees a strong electronic music influence, with electronic instruments and drum machines featuring on the songs, especially those written by Steve Diggle, who wrote five of the album's songs whilst Pete Shelley wrote the other eight songs.

Although the album was recorded with the idea that it sounded contemporary, the album's sound was said to emulate new wave music from the early 1980s, including from Pete Shelley's solo career, and was also categorised as sounding like the art punk band Magazine, formed in the late 1970s by former Buzzcocks member Howard Devoto. One critic said that "rather than destroy the pop song they [deconstruct] it, playfully reinventing it as a catchy, self-conscious pastiche of itself." Shelley's lyrical content express explosive angst and irritability coupled with lingering discomfort and frustration.

The album was released in September 1999 in the UK by EMI and in the US by Go-Kart, their first release for both labels. In the UK, CD copies were paired with an enhanced CD compilation entitled A Different Kind of Product, featuring early singles by the band and computer elements such as a slide show and video compilation. Although not a commercial success, Modern received generally favourable reviews from critics, being referred to by Allmusic as a "minor triumph" and by another critic as "a very good record." Nonetheless, the record did have some detractors. According to Mick O'Shear, Modern ""served to affirm that Buzzcocks could still appeal to a global audience while still remaining true to their original ideals."

== Background and recording ==
In 1993, Buzzcocks released Trade Test Transmissions, their first album since reuniting in 1989 and a return to the band's original pop-fpunk sound and a departure from the experimental music Shelly and Diggle had recorded away from the Buzzcocks. Although it was a critical success, it was not a commercial one despite the huge surge in popularity for pop-punk at the same time, They followed it with All Set (1996), another critical success which saw the band experiment "here and there" on the album with atypical instruments and arrangements. Ned Raggett of Allmusic described the experiments as "hints of trying to breathe once again beyond the basic formula." All Set was released on I.R.S. Records, but the label closed only two months after the release of the album, leaving the band without a record label. The band were intending to tour in promotion of All Set throughout the rest of 1996 and then record and release a second album for I.R.S. Records in 1997, but the closure of the label led to the band having to cancel the plans.

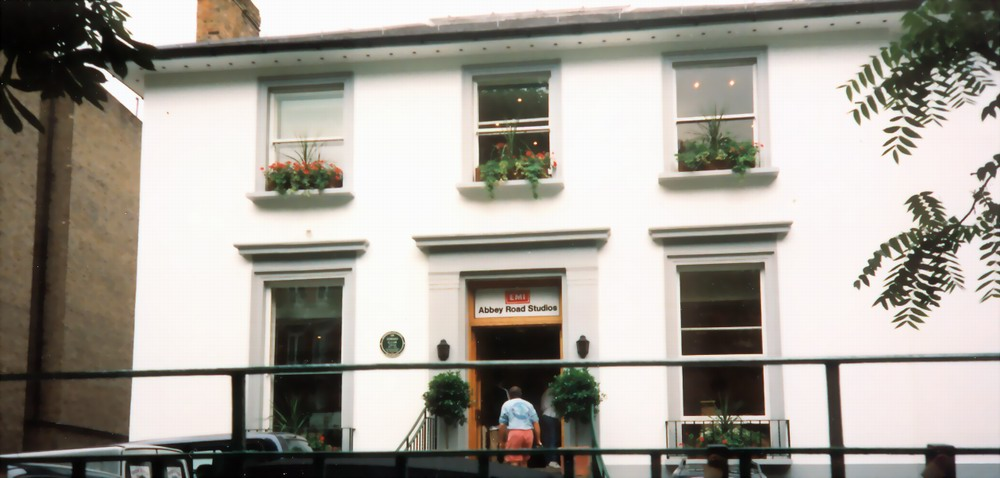
The album was mastered at Abbey Road Studios, London.

Pete Shelley recalled that the band had become "uncomfortable with trying to be a rock band, when everybody's trying to be one." The band thought "why bother" and with their next album made an attempt to "be more modern" and inflict new influences into their music. The concept gave the album its title, Modern. The band's bassist Tony Barber arranged and produced the new record, which was recorded in summer 1998 at The Surgery, Barnet, Herefordshire. Derek Fudge engineered the sessions. It was reported on 19 July 1998 that the band had been recording for three weeks, with another three days to go, after which Barker [who had been touring Stratford Mercenaries] will "come in soon to record all of the drum parts," whilst biographer Tony McGartland said that "with the exception of minor tweaking the album will be done in early September [1998]." The band wrote 23 songs, but only recorded 14, with the possible intention to record the other nine songs at a later stage for usage as B-sides. The album was mixed over two weeks at Woodbine Street Recording Studios, Leamington Spa, Warwickshire, with extra engineering by Joan A. Rivers, a process which concluded on 2 October 1998, and was belatedly mastered in June 1999 by Chris Blair at the world-famous Abbey Road Studios, London.

Pete Shelley wrote eight of the songs, whilst Steve Diggle wrote the remaining five songs. When interviewed by Ear Candy Mag, Pete Shelley said that, compared to writing songs in the 1970s, there was more ways of writing songs for Modern but "then again there's more distractions." He said "I think because a lot of the songs we did as the Buzzcocks were all written five minutes before going into the studio. So, its easier when you start writing songs. You haven't got any songs that you know you are trying to write like that. So, you don't have that subconscious fear of coming up with the same song twice. It's a little bit harder than that, trying to make sure that you don't re-write the same songs ad nauseam." When asked if his writing style was different than Diggle's, he said "well, I tend to wait until the last minute before I write songs, where Steve likes to finish them all and have them all ready. I'm notoriously bad... all right you have to do the world tour tomorrow! So I just stay up all night writing the lyrics. If it was me, I'd wait until the day of release before finishing."

== Musical and lyrical style ==
Unlike previous albums by the band, Modern makes prominent use of numerous electronic instruments and drum machines, particularly on Steve Diggle's material, although Shelley's songs are more akin to the band's usual "catchy, tightly written punk and pop songs." Michael Sandlin of Pitchfork saw it as an attempt from the band to sound "current" and compared its programmed drums and "sputtering synth blips" to techno. Shelley said that the band were "trying not to make a rock album. So, instead of trying to make it sound like we were a rock band, we tried a more studio based approach. And, more control over what was going on. Also, we felt uncomfortable with trying to be a rock band, when everybody's trying to be one. We though, why bother...be more modern." Ear Candy Mag told him that Modern "is contemporary, but it is definitely Buzzcocks," noting that his "voice is very distinctive." Antek Gun of Ox Fanzine said that instead of being a punk rock album, Modern sees the band "work with strange, rapidly alternating sounds, sizzling guitars, synthesizers from a forgotten time." However, Wilson Neate of Consumable Online played down the electronic influence of the album, saying that the album continues the "pretty much" same approach as the band's 1970s albums: "short, sharp-edged, anxious and angst ridden, irritable and irritated punk pop.

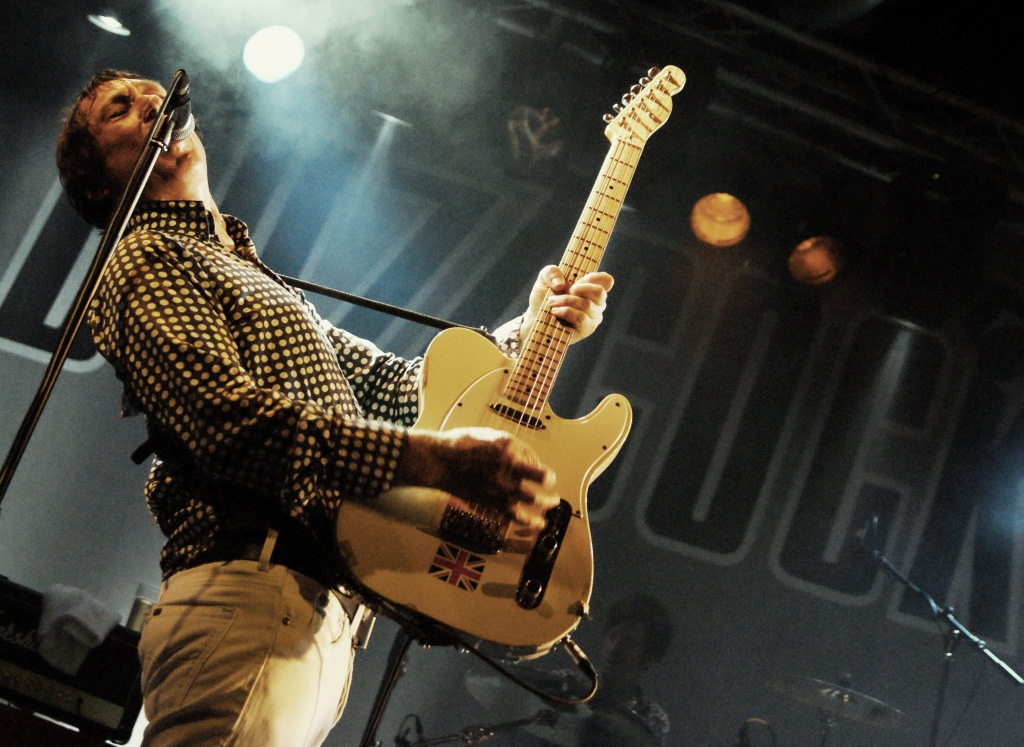
Modern displays a prominent electronic influence, especially on the songs written by Steve Diggle.

Despite being described by some and by Shelley as an attempt to sound more modern, many critics compared it to new wave music of the late 1970s and/or early 80s; Joshua Klein of The A.V. Club said Modern was "something else entirely" from their previous albums, calling its title ironic as it "essentially [picks] up where the band left off in 1981" after they split because it "sounds like it was recorded just as punk turned into new wave." However, he also stated that "oddly enough, much of Modern resembles the art punk music founding Buzzcock Howard Devoto would later make in Magazine. Mark Caro of The Chicago Tribune agreed with the former statement, saying he assumed "the title is meant ironically because this is a very 1982 version of modern -- i.e., the Buzzcocks have discovered synths and drum machines of the sort singer Pete Shelley was using in his brief solo career." Similarly, Skate and Annoy said that "Modern doesn’t look or sound very modern, maybe 20 years old modern, but that’s not bad. A lot of the tracks sound like Shelley solo efforts would have sounded if he had stuck to guitars." Comparisons were made between some songs and Shelley's 1983 solo album XL1.

"Also crucial to the Buzzcocks' reinvention of the pop song, and demonstrated perfectly again by Modern, is Shelley's ability to endlessly rewrite the classic adolescent pop narrative, albeit in gender-ambiguous terms and from an unrelentingly miserable and niggly perspective. We can only hope that Shelley's lyrical voice is not his own given that, after all these years, it's still distinctly unlucky and profoundly unhappy in love."

— Wilson Neate of Consumable Online

Wilson Neate of Consumable Online said that "rather than destroy the pop song they [deconstruct] it, playfully reinventing it as a catchy, self-conscious pastiche of itself." Neate noted that as with previous albums, Pete Shelley's work on Modern takes the historically distant, paradigmatic pop format of 50s and 60s bubblegum boy-girl songs as its starting point, but while the lyrical and musical framework of this foundational form is left nominally intact (the harmonies, the I/you romance narrative, the straightforward verse/chorus structure and the simple chord progressions), it is compressed into a shorter, faster package, supplemented and shot through with jagged, saw-like guitars, and scattered with irregular, staccato beats, adding that "still crucial too is Shelley's distinctive vocal style which continues to unsettle the traditional, formal symmetry of conventional pop. Modern is rife with examples of irregular combinations of short punchy stanzas and lengthy, weaving run-on lines–sometimes stretched out for a painful but compelling duration–that both carry and lead the songs. Moreover, this combination of the brusque and the drawn out line--on top of the contrast of the staccato beats and the whining, UK-police-siren-circa-'76 guitar sound--emphasizes the twin-pronged emotional thrust of Shelley's lyrical content: that is, the expression of explosive angst and irritability coupled with lingering discomfort and frustration."

== Songs ==
"For me if you can walk down the street and you can see the sun then it’s all not that bad. It was like the Wild West in Camden at the time, that song came through running into those people, seeing casualties, lots of people thinking they were going to make it, their dreams becoming a nightmare."

— Steve Diggle referring to "Don't Let the Car Crash", which refers to a car crash he was in aged 17 in which his best friend died.

Opening song "Soul on a Rock" begins with synths and guitars which "combust with energy." "Rendevouz" has been compared to the new wave band Blondie. "Thunder of Hearts" features the Japanese proverb "even monkeys fall from trees"; Shelley said "I sometimes buy lots of Japanese books, and there was one which was Japanese proverbs. And that was actually the title of the book, even monkeys fall from trees. It means even the most skillful people can make mistakes." "Why Compromise?" features a minimalistic electronic drum sound and has been described as an "discoid anthem." "Don't Let the Car Crash" is one of the album's less immediate songs. Mark Caro of The Chicago Tribune described "Doesn't Mean Anything" as "rapping-over-Casiotone." Skate and Annoy said "as goofy as the production on “Doesn’t Mean Anything” is, it grows on you." "Turn of the Screw" is one of the album's examples of Shelley's "straight-ahead pop-punk" songs. "Phone" has been compared to the music of Shelley's solo album XL1 (1983). "Runaround" and "Thunder of Hearts" are "instant singalongs" that showcase Shelley's "guitar-driven bubble punk."

Gigslutz observed that "Speed of Life" and "Don't Let the Car Crash" both sport "Bowie-esque titles," as David Bowie's electronic-tinged album Low (1977) contained tracks named "Speed of Life" and "Always Crashing in the Same Car". When asking Diggle if the band were inspired by him on the album, replied "I’d forgotten 'Speed of Life', it was a little in-joke to me because I was taking a lot of speed at the time! Britpop was underway, lots of crazy parties, hedonistic times, that notion of living your life, too busy to notice what you’re doing, don’t always stop and think ‘Who the fuck am I?" He added that "Don't let the Car Crash" dates from when he was in a car crash when he was 17: "my best mate died, we were all a bit drunk going down the road, we’d been thrown out of a club for dancing with each other, sure they were playing ‘Starman’! We got in and the car careered off the road, and I thought ‘Fuck, I’m gonna die’, was thrown about everywhere. we ended up in a garage and demolished the petrol pump, we could have all gone up in flames. When I got out my mate was on the floor, I thought he was ok, it seemed to take forever, he'd died. That changed my life a lot."

== Release ==
As the collapse of I.R.S. Records in July 1996 had left the band without a record deal, the band signed to EMI in the United Kingdom and independent punk rock label Go-Kart Records in the United States. EMI had contacted the band keen to release one of their albums and wanted to know when they could have one, with Barber replying to them "we have one done already". Upon being given the album in March 1999, EMI were reported to "love it already." In the UK, Modern was released by EMI on 7 September 1999 as an LP and as a double CD set; the second disc being the newly compiled greatest hits compilation A Different Kind of Product. This extra disc was an abridged version of the band's anthology box set Product (1989) and contains twelve of the band's early singles as well as an enhanced CD element featuring the music videos for the Modern song "Promises" and two of the early singles featured on the disc, "What Do I Get?" and "Why She's a Girl from the Chainstore." The enhanced CD also features "loads of memorabilia", including a multimedia described by one critic as "a slide show without commentary and a bad interface" and the 1980s I.R.S. video Playback, an "excellent" video featuring studio and live footage, promotional videos, and TV appearances from Top of the Pops, Jukebox Jury, and "some bizarro kids program" among others.

The album was released in the United States by Go-Kart Records as a single CD and LP a week later on 14 September 1999. It did not feature the bonus disc, but most copies did feature new artwork, featuring a black album cover instead of the stark blue sleeve of the UK release, which was designed by Buzzcocks and The Red Room. Another special edition was released in the US, featuring a pink vinyl. To promote the album in the UK, EMI released Promotional Product, an EP led by two songs from Modern–"Thunder of Hearts" and a radio edit of "Soul on a Rock"–and completed by the band's 1978 single "Ever Fallen in Love (With Someone You Shouldn't've)". A music video was also produced for "Thunder of Hearts". As with previous singles, the band "let other people decide" that the song would be the first single: "We tend to go with the consensus. It seemed a bit arrogant to say that we know better than everyone else. I mean we do." Modern and the EP were not commercial success in either country, but the album saw steady sales due to the band's supporting tour. Pending contractual issues, Modern was belatedly released in early 2000 in Europe and Japan.

== Critical reception ==
Professional ratings
Review scores
Source	Rating
AllMusic	3/5 stars
Robert Christgau	(3-star Honorable Mention)
Pitchfork	3.5/10

Critical response to Modern was mostly positive. Stephen Thomas Erlewine of AllMusic said that although "Diggle's songs sound a little weaker than Pete Shelley's" due to their electronic influence, Modern is a "minor triumph" that proves that "the Buzzcocks not only sound better than any of their punk peers on Modern, they sound better than most of the young punk revivalists. And at the very least, that's somewhat noteworthy." Antek Pistole of Ox Fanzine said the band "still write great songs" and said that although the album might not appeal to fans of 1977 punk rock, it would appeal to Buzzcocks fans. Kilwag of Skate and Annoy was very favourable, "Modern is a very good record. If the Buzzcocks were a new band this record would probably be getting lots of press, hype, and promotion. Let’s hope that enough people buy it so that Pete (Well Steve) doesn’t feel it necessary to sell the rights to Autonomy to Microsoft." Robert Christgau quipped that Modern showed the band "looking for the same new love with the same new tunes" and rated it a "three-star honorable mention", indicating "an enjoyable effort consumers attuned to its overriding aesthetic or individual vision may well treasure."

In a very favourable review, Wilson Neate of Consumable Online said that "during its finest moments, Modern reminds us that the Buzzcocks' significant contributions are often unfairly overshadowed by a tendency to look no further than the Sex Pistols or the Clash for a blueprint of British punk. The Pistols wrote the book on punk-as-situation / style / shock, while the Clash covered the political angle, but the Buzzcocks (along with Wire) took punk beyond the gesture and the pose and left perhaps the most substantial and enduring musical legacy." He concluded "so, to plagiarize a question asked by Pete Shelley quite a few years ago, "what do I get" from Modern? Quite a lot actually. During its best moments--"Soul on a Rock", Rendezvous," "Runaround," "Choices," "Why Compromise" and "Under the Sun"—this album is vintage Buzzcocks. And what more could you ask for?" Joshua Klein of The A.V. Club, on the other hand, wrote "the band reunited in time to ride the new punk wave, but something was missing from its two capable comeback albums. The new Modern is something else entirely: Essentially picking up where the band left off in 1981, the ironically-titled disc sounds like it was recorded just as punk turned into new wave", calling it "retro in the best sense".

The album had some mixed and negative reviews. Michael Sandlin of Pitchfork rated the album 3.5/10 and called it "wholly ill-conceived and mind-numbingly dull" and that "[it] seems like a weak attempt by a once-great band to simply sound 'current', whatever that means." Mark Caro of the Chicago Tribune said that "catchiness without urgency equals something, but vintage Buzzcocks it ain't." David Daley of the Hartford Courant said, "The Buzzcocks' caffeinated punk-pop of two decades ago was fueled by teenage angst and desire, and of their contemporaries, perhaps only the Undertones did it better. Now, it's not that angst ever disappears. But there's still something tragic about singer/songwriter Pete Shelley's attempts to milk those now long-dried wells on Modern, as his helium-voice laments the return to fast cars, watched phones that don't ring and misbegotten romances."

== Legacy ==
In his 2012 book The Anarchy Tour, music writer Mick O'Shea said that alongside the band's other post-reunion albums, Modern "served to affirm that Buzzcocks could still appeal to a global audience while still remaining true to their original ideals." whilst music writer Colin Larkin rated the album three stars out of five in the fifth edition of The Encyclopedia of Popular Music (2011), saying that alongside All Set, it "confirmed the Buzzcocks' latter-day renaissance." Alongside All Set, it has been said that Modern "reaffirmed Buzzcocks' position as a band deeply loved and revered by a global audience, simultaneously true to their original ideals and open to new ideas." Regardless, in The New Rolling Stone Album Guide (2004), Modern is rated with two stars out of five and is described as "plastic new wave." Skate and Annoy said that "each time you listen to Modern it gets better and better."

== Track listing ==
All songs written and composed by Pete Shelley, except where noted.

No.	Title	Writer(s)	Length
1.	"Soul on a Rock"		4:00
2.	"Rendezvous"		3:35
3.	"Speed of Life"	Steve Diggle	4:32
4.	"Thunder of Hearts"		2:56
5.	"Why Compromise?"		3:32
6.	"Don't Let the Car Crash"	Diggle	4:28
7.	"Runaround"		3:27
8.	"Doesn't Mean Anything"	Diggle	2:49
9.	"Phone"		3:02
10.	"Under the Sun"		3:31
11.	"Turn of the Screw"	Diggle	2:38
12.	"Sneaky"		2:20
13.	"Stranger in Your Town"	Diggle	2:25
14.	"Choices"		3:31

== Personnel ==
Adapted from the album liner notes.

Buzzcocks

- Pete Shelley – guitar, vocals
- Steve Diggle – guitar, vocals
- Tony Barber – bass
- Philip Barker – drums

Technical

- Tony Barber – producer
- Derek Fudge – engineer
- John A. Rivers – mixing engineer
- Chris Blair – mastering
- Buzzcocks – artwork
- The Red Room@EMI – artwork
- Tim O'Sullivan – photography
