= Singles Going Steady =

Compilation album by Buzzcocks
- Released: 25 September 1979
- Recorded: November 1977 – July 1979
- Genres: Punk rock, pop punk
- Length: 47:14 (original), 74:40 (reissue)
- Labels: I.R.S., United Artists
- Producers: Martin Rushent, Martin Hannett

Buzzcocks chronology
Love Bites (1978)	Singles Going Steady (1979)	A Different Kind of Tension (1979)

Singles Going Steady is a compilation album by English punk rock band Buzzcocks, released on I.R.S. Records in the United States on 25 September 1979.

== Background ==
Singles Going Steady was the first Buzzcocks album to be released in North America and intended as an introduction to the band for the American public, coinciding with a tour of the US. Side one of the original release of the album featured their eight UK single releases on United Artists Records from 1977 up to the time of Singles Going Steady's release in 1979 in chronological order, while side two featured their corresponding B-sides, also in chronological order.

After healthy sales on import in the UK over the next two years, and following the group's split in early 1981, the album was belatedly released in the band's home country on United Artists Records on 16 November 1981 as a 'greatest hits' album. However, as in the US, the album failed to chart.

The album was reissued in expanded form on compact disc in 2001 with an extra eight tracks, featuring the A-sides and B-sides of Buzzcocks' four singles released between Singles Going Steady and the group's break-up.

== Critical reception ==
Professional ratings
Review scores
Source	Rating
AllMusic	5/5 stars
Classic Rock	9/10
Mojo	5/5 stars
Pitchfork	9.4/10
Q	5/5 stars
Record Collector	5/5 stars
The Rolling Stone Album Guide	5/5 stars
Spin Alternative Record Guide	10/10
Uncut	9/10
The Village Voice	A−

Reviewing the album on import in 1979, NME called Buzzcocks "a vital part of the inspiration for the new pop age... This is the best album Buzzcocks never made. Hear it and weep." A second review by the NME two years later upon the album's official UK release was no less enthusiastic, declaring that "this is the best Buzzcocks long-player to be realised, enshrining eight singles and their B-sides in a compilation which at a stroke helps to forgive the inconsistency of their other albums and clarifies the enormous debt which post-Buzzcocks pop owes to this frail practitioner [referring to Buzzcocks principal songwriter and singer Pete Shelley]... Employing the most traditional of beat group formations and turning their attention to the most elemental considerations, Shelley and the Buzzcocks created pop of such intense truthfulness it literally hurts."

Melody Maker claimed that "to describe it as 'wonderful' would be doing the lads a gross injustice... Somehow, they devised a simple, crude but hugely effective medium for songs which were fast, funny and memorable." Reviewing the 2001 reissue, Q said, "When Kurt Cobain picked these aging English punk rockers as the support act on Nirvana's final tour, the Buzzcocks received long-overdue recognition as one of the punk era's greatest singles groups... this singles collection, newly supplemented with eight bonus tracks, has lost none of its vitality."

Writing for AllMusic, Neg Raggett believed Singles Going Steady belongs in the pantheon of other "punk masterpieces" such as Never Mind the Bollocks and London Calling. Continuing, he states: "[A]nybody who ever combined full-blast rock, catchy melodies, and romantic and social anxieties owes something to what the classic quartet did here." Looking back in 2019, Pitchfork's Jason Heller called the compilation "a paragon of songwriting about the pain and joy of love" and wrote that it "stands as one of the most endearing, intimate, and impeccably crafted batch of earworms in either the love-song or punk-rock realm". Heller praised the album's willingness to address emotions through punk music, saying, "Unrequited longing, severed ties, knock-kneed bashfulness, rash declarations of euphoric infatuation: Shelley delivers it all with jaunty melodies and deceptively complex chord progressions on par with the Beatles and the Kinks". In Record Collector, David Quantick wrote called Singles Going Steady a "masterpiece" and "probably the best singles-only collection of all time".

=== Accolades ===
In 2003, Singles Going Steady was ranked at number 358 on Rolling Stone's list of The 500 Greatest Albums of All Time. It has been subsequently included on updates of the list published in 2012 (at number 360), 2020 (at number 250), and 2023 (at number 250).

In 2004, Pitchfork listed Singles Going Steady as the 16th best album of the 1970s.

== Track listing ==
Side one

Original release
No.	Title	Writer(s)	Originally from	Length
1.	"Orgasm Addict"	Howard Devoto, Pete Shelley	Non-album single	2:00
2.	"What Do I Get?"	Shelley	Non-album single	2:52
3.	"I Don't Mind"	Shelley	Another Music in a Different Kitchen	2:16
4.	"Love You More"	Shelley	Non-album single	1:47
5.	"Ever Fallen in Love (With Someone You Shouldn't've)"	Shelley	Love Bites	2:39
6.	"Promises"	Steve Diggle, Shelley	Non-album single	2:34
7.	"Everybody's Happy Nowadays"	Shelley	Non-album single	3:09
8.	"Harmony in My Head"	Diggle	Non-album single	3:06
Total length:				20:23

2001 re-release
No.	Title	Writer(s)	Originally from	Length
9.	"You Say You Don't Love Me"	Shelley	A Different Kind of Tension	2:54
10.	"Are Everything"	Shelley	Non-album single	3:59
11.	"Strange Thing"	Shelley	Non-album single	4:10
12.	"Running Free"	Diggle	Non-album single	3:14
Total length:				14:17

Side two

Original release
No.	Title	Writer(s)	Originally from	Length
1.	"What Ever Happened To?"	Alan Dial, Shelley	"Orgasm Addict" single	2:12
2.	"Oh Shit!"	Shelley	"What Do I Get?" single	1:34
3.	"Autonomy"	Diggle	Another Music in a Different Kitchen	3:41
4.	"Noise Annoys"	Shelley	"Love You More" single	2:49
5.	"Just Lust"	Dial, Shelley	Love Bites	2:58
6.	"Lipstick"	Diggle, Shelley	"Promises" single	2:36
7.	"Why Can't I Touch It?"	Diggle, Steve Garvey, John Maher, Shelley	"Everybody's Happy Nowadays" single	6:32
8.	"Something's Gone Wrong Again"	Shelley	"Harmony in My Head" single	4:29
Total length:				26:51 47:14

2001 re-release
No.	Title	Writer(s)	Originally from	Length
9.	"Raison D'etre"	Shelley	A Different Kind of Tension	3:34
10.	"Why She's a Girl from the Chainstore"	Diggle	"Are Everything" single	2:26
11.	"Airwaves Dream"	Diggle	"Strange Thing" single	3:54
12.	"What Do You Know?"	Shelley	"Running Free" single	3:15
Total length:				13:09 74:40

== Personnel ==
Buzzcocks

- Pete Shelley – lead vocals, guitar
- Steve Diggle – guitar, backing vocals, lead vocal on "Harmony in My Head"
- Steve Garvey – bass guitar (except "Orgasm Addict" and "What Ever Happened To?")
- John Maher – drums
- Garth Smith – bass guitar on "Orgasm Addict" and "What Ever Happened To?"

== Release history ==
Region	Date	Label	Format	Catalog
United States	25 September 1979	I.R.S. Records	LP	SP 001
Canada	25 September 1979	I.R.S. Records	LP	SP 001
United Kingdom	9 November 1979	United Artists Records	LP	UAK 30279
United States	1988	I.R.S.	CD	CD 001
Europe	20 August 2001	EMI	expanded CD	7243 5 34442 2 8

== See also ==
- Buzzcocks discography
