= Flat-Pack Philosophy =

Studio album by Buzzcocks
- Released: March 7, 2006
- Recorded: 2004–2005
- Studio: Southern, London; Mixed at Woodbine Street Recording Studios, Leamington Spa in 2005
- Genre: Pop-punk
- Length: 36:32
- Label: Cooking Vinyl
- Producer: Tony Barber

Buzzcocks chronology
Buzzcocks (2003)	Flat-Pack Philosophy (2006)	The Way (2014)

Singles from Flat-Pack Philosophy
- 1. "Wish I Never Loved You" Released: February 2006; 2. "Sell You Everything" Released: August 2006; 3. "Reconciliation" Released: December 2006

Professional ratings
Review scores
Source	Rating
AllMusic	3.5/5 stars
Neumu	7/10
Pitchfork	7.2/10
PopMatters	7/10
Punknews.org	4.5/5 stars
Uncut	4/5 stars

Flat-Pack Philosophy is the eighth studio album by English pop punk band Buzzcocks. It was released on 7 March 2006 by record label Cooking Vinyl.

== Release ==
Flat-Pack Philosophy was released on 7 March 2006; it was promoted with a UK tour with support from the Adored. Between March and May 2006, the band played across Europe, which included appearances at the Bourge Festival and Festival of the Arts. Partway through this trek, drummer Phil Barker left the band and was replaced by Danny Farrant. In June 2006, they played a few US East Coast shows prior to joining that year's Warped Tour, and then headlining another month's worth of shows with support from the Adored, the Strays, and Easy Image.

In August 2006, "Sell You Everything" was released as a single, with a live version of "16" and a demo of "Every Day Every Night" as the B-sides. Three months later, the band held two special shows to celebrate their 30th anniversary. On 4 December 2006, "Reconciliation" was released as single, with "See Through You" and "Holding Me Down" as the B-sides. In April and May 2007, they played three Europeans shows, prior to a short South American tour; upon returning to the UK, they played one-off shows in Newcastle and in Spain as part of the Primavera Sound festival.

== Track listing ==
All tracks are written by Pete Shelley, except where noted

No.	Title	Writer(s)	Length
1.	"Flat-Pack Philosophy"		3:06
2.	"Wish I Never Loved You"		2:38
3.	"Sell You Everything"	Steve Diggle	2:25
4.	"Reconciliation"		2:57
5.	"I Don't Exist"		2:20
6.	"Soul Survivor"	Diggle	1:41
7.	"God, What Have I Done"		2:16
8.	"Credit"		3:22
9.	"Big Brother Wheels"	Diggle	2:39
10.	"Dreamin'"		2:40
11.	"Sound of a Gun"	Diggle	2:27
12.	"Look at You Now"		2:16
13.	"I've Had Enough"		2:29
14.	"Between Heaven and Hell"	Diggle	3:16

== Personnel ==
Adapted from the album liner notes.

Buzzcocks

- Pete Shelley – guitar, vocals
- Steve Diggle – guitar, vocals
- Tony Barber – bass
- Philip Barker – drums

Technical

- Tony Barber – producer, arrangements
- Harvey Birrell – engineer
- John A. Rivers – remixing, mastering
- Buzzcocks – sleeve concept
- Paul Terrence Madden – sleeve concept, photography, design
- Julia Helen Robinson – additional montage photography
