= Trade Test Transmissions =

Studio album by Buzzcocks
- Released: 14 June 1993
- Recorded: March–April 1993
- Studio: Eastcote, London
- Genre: Pop-punk
- Length: 47:58
- Label: Essential (UK), Caroline (USA)
- Producer: Ralph P. Ruppert

Buzzcocks chronology
Operator's Manual: Buzzcocks Best (1991)	Trade Test Transmissions (1993)	All Set (1996)

Singles from Trade Test Transmissions
- 1. "Innocent" Released: May 1993; 2. "Do It" Released: August 1993; 3. "Isolation" Released: 1995

Trade Test Transmissions is the fourth studio album by English pop-punk band Buzzcocks. It was released on 14 June 1993 by record label Castle Communications on their sub-label Essential Records and was the band's first release in fourteen years, following up 1979's A Different Kind of Tension. The music was quite different from their earlier material with nods to the power pop scene popular at the time.

== Reception ==
Professional ratings
Review scores
Source	Rating
AllMusic	3/5 stars
Chicago Tribune	3.5/5 stars
Robert Christgau	(choice cut)
Entertainment Weekly	A−
Pitchfork	6.9/10
PopMatters	6/10

Trade Test Transmissions has been generally well received by critics.

Jason Crock of Pitchfork was generally favourable, though writing "the album remains a strictly diehards-only affair." CMJ later qualified it as "a superb record which oddly got lost in the shuffle".

== Track listing ==
All songs written and composed by Pete Shelley, except as noted.

No.	Title	Writer(s)	Length
1.	"Do It"		3:23
2.	"Innocent"		3:34
3.	"TTT"		3:18
4.	"Isolation"	Steve Diggle	3:58
5.	"Smile"		2:47
6.	"Last to Know"		2:52
7.	"When Love Turns Around"	Diggle	2:25
8.	"Never Gonna Give It Up"		2:47
9.	"Energy"	Diggle	3:35
10.	"Palm of Your Hand"		3:22
11.	"Alive Tonight"	Diggle	3:48
12.	"Who'll Help Me to Forget?"		2:57
13.	"Unthinkable"	Diggle	2:52
14.	"Crystal Night"		3:18
15.	"369"		3:02

2004 reissue bonus tracks
No.	Title	Writer(s)	Length
16.	"Inside" (B-side of "Innocent")		2:32
17.	"Do It" (single version)		2:57
18.	"Trash Away" (live; B-side of "Do It")	Diggle	4:44
19.	"All Over You" (live; B-side of "Do It")		3:25
20.	"Libertine Angel" (non-album single, 1994)		2:57
21.	"Roll It Over" (B-side of "Libertine Angel")	Diggle	6:07
22.	"Excerpt from 'Prison Riot Hostage'" (B-side of "Libertine Angel")		1:59

== Personnel ==
Adapted from the album liner notes.

Buzzcocks

- Pete Shelley – guitar, vocals
- Steve Diggle – guitar, vocals
- Tony Barber – bass *credited as Tony Arber in CD sleeve booklet
- Philip Barker – drums

Technical

- Ralph P. Ruppert – production
- Ingo Vauk, Philip Bagenal – mixing engineers
- Graeme Durham – mastering
- Malcolm Garrett – album design
- Pete Towndrow – photography
