= Buzzcocks (album) =

Studio album by Buzzcocks
- Released: 18 March 2003
- Recorded: March and August 2002
- Studios: Southern, London
- Genre: Pop-punk
- Length: 34:52
- Labels: Merge (US); Cherry Red (UK)
- Producer: Tony Barber

Buzzcocks chronology
Modern (1999)	Buzzcocks (2003)	Flat-Pack Philosophy (2006)

Singles from Buzzcocks
- 1. "Jerk" Released: April 2003; 2. "Sick City Sometimes" Released: October 2003

Buzzcocks is the seventh studio album by English pop-punk band Buzzcocks. It was released on 18 March 2003 by Merge in the US and Cherry Red in the UK.

== Critical reception ==
Professional ratings
Review scores
Source	Rating
AllMusic	4/5 stars
Blender	2/5 stars
Robert Christgau	(1-star Honorable Mention)
Entertainment Weekly	B+
Neumu	8/10
Pitchfork	6.7/10
PopMatters	favourable
Stylus Magazine	F

Buzzcocks has received a mixed-to-favourable response from critics. AllMusic opined, "If Buzzcocks doesn't reinvent this band, it does give their approach a bit of an overhaul, and the results make for an album which holds onto their strengths while lending a more mature perspective to their work; hard to imagine Rancid having anything this interesting up their sleeve twenty-seven years down the line from their first recording." Entertainment Weekly's review was favourable, writing "it's nice to hear that middle age hasn't diminished the songwriting skills of original 'Cocks Pete Shelley and Steve Diggle."

Stylus Magazine, on the other hand, gave the album their lowest possible score of F, opining that the album sounds like "third-generation Green Day".

== Track listing ==
1. "Jerk" (Pete Shelley) – 2:21
2. "Keep On" (Shelley) – 3:19
3. "Wake Up Call" (Steve Diggle) – 3:19
4. "Friends" (Shelley) – 2:57
5. "Driving You Insane" (Diggle) – 2:24
6. "Morning After" (Shelley) – 2:34
7. "Sick City Sometimes" (Diggle) – 2:59
8. "Stars" (Howard Devoto, Shelley) – 2:46
9. "Certain Move" (Diggle) – 3:02
10. "Lester Sands" (Devoto, Shelley) – 2:47
11. "Up for the Crack" (Diggle) – 2:23
12. "Useless" (Shelley) – 4:01

== Personnel ==
Adapted from the album liner notes.

Buzzcocks

- Pete Shelley – guitar, vocals
- Steve Diggle – guitar, vocals
- Tony Barber – bass guitar
- Philip Barker – drums

Technical

- Tony Barber – producer
- Harvey Birrell – engineer
- Duncan Cowell – mastering
- Paul Burgess – sleeve layout
- Chris Bushnell – sleeve layout
- Buzzcocks – sleeve concept
