= A Different Kind of Tension =

Studio album by Buzzcocks
- Released: 21 September 1979
- Recorded: 1979
- Studios: Eden, London
- Genres: Punk rock; post-punk
- Length: 40:08
- Label: United Artists
- Producer: Martin Rushent

Buzzcocks chronology
Singles Going Steady (1979)	A Different Kind of Tension (1979)	Operator's Manual: Buzzcocks Best (1991)

Singles from A Different Kind of Tension
- 1. "You Say You Don't Love Me / Raison D'etre" Released: 1979; 2. "I Believe / Something's Gone Wrong Again" Released: 1980

A Different Kind of Tension is the third studio album by English punk rock band Buzzcocks. It was released in September 1979 by record label United Artists.

It charted at number 26 in the United Kingdom and number 163 in the United States.

== Recording and production ==
A Different Kind of Tension, under the guidance of English record producer Martin Rushent and the management of Richard Boon, was recorded at Eden Studios, mixed at Genetic Sound, mastered by George Peckham at Portland Recording Studio, and published worldwide in vinyl LP format in 1979 and 1980 through United Artists Records, EMI, and I.R.S. Records. The album was subsequently reissued many times, and first released in CD format in 1989 by I.R.S. featuring the 1981 6-track promo EP Pts. 1–3. This same version was remastered in 1992. In 2008 (Europe) and 2010 (US) EMI and Mute Records released a 2-CD remastered version of the album featuring its associated singles, demo recordings, and the band John Peel's BBC Radio 1 shows of 23 November 1978 (recorded on 18 November 1978) and 28 May 1979 (recorded on 21 May 1979).

== Album cover ==
The sleeve features a photograph of the band by Jill Furmanovsky amongst a montage of triangles. This continued the artistic theme established by Malcolm Garrett on the covers of Another Music in a Different Kitchen (squares) and Love Bites (circles).

== Critical reception ==
Professional ratings
Review scores
Source	Rating
AllMusic	4/5 stars
Classic Rock	8/10
Mojo	4/5 stars
Record Collector	5/5 stars
Rolling Stone	4/5 stars
The Rolling Stone Album Guide	4/5 stars
Smash Hits	7/10
Spin Alternative Record Guide	9/10
Uncut	7/10
The Village Voice	B+

In a contemporary review of A Different Kind of Tension, Mikal Gilmore of Rolling Stone felt that the album suffered from repetitiveness, "resulting in a catchall of reworked riffs and static, similar tempos", while nonetheless praising it as their "most formidable record yet". The Globe and Mail concluded that, "except for 'Mad Mad Judy' (the most biting thing on the disc) the really fine material is stacked on the tail end of the second side." The New York Times determined that "it is the tension between the music's pop lyricism and the band's all-out rock-and-roll energy that makes this English quartet so special."

In a retrospective review, Rolling Stone's Jon Dolan called A Different Kind of Tension the best of the band's first three albums. In Uncut, David Cavanagh observed that the album was divided between an unsurprisingly punk-flavoured first half and an experimental second half which harkened to the future.

== Track listing ==
All tracks are written by Pete Shelley, except where noted.

Side One: The Rose on the Chocolate Box
No.	Title	Writer(s)	Length
1.	"Paradise"		2:23
2.	"Sitting Round at Home"	Steve Diggle	2:38
3.	"You Say You Don't Love Me"		2:55
4.	"You Know You Can't Help It"	Diggle	2:22
5.	"Mad Mad Judy"	Diggle	3:35
6.	"Raison d'etre"		3:32
Total length:			17:25

Side Two: The Thorn Beneath the Rose
No.	Title	Length
1.	"I Don't Know What to Do with My Life"	2:43
2.	"Money"	2:45
3.	"Hollow Inside"	4:46
4.	"A Different Kind of Tension"	4:39
5.	"I Believe"	7:09
6.	"Radio Nine"	0:41
Total length:		22:43 40:08

== Personnel ==
Buzzcocks

- Pete Shelley – guitar (left channel), vocals, keyboards
- Steve Diggle – guitar (right channel), vocals
- Steve Garvey – bass guitar
- John Maher – drums

Technical

- Martin Rushent – producer/engineer
- Nick Froome – second engineer
- George Peckham – mastering
- Malcolm Garrett – artwork
- Kevin Cummins – photography (Shelley)
- Jill Furmanovsky – photography (group)
- Peter Monks – photography (Maher)
- Gervaise Soeurouge – photography (Garvey)
- Judith Wrightson – photography (Diggle)

== Charts ==
Chart (1979–80)	Peak position
UK Albums (Official Charts)	26
US Billboard 200	163
