= Flag of Convenience (band) =

- Origin: Manchester, England
- Genres: Alternative rock; post-punk; new wave; indie rock
- Years active: 1982–1989
- Labels: Sire; M.C.M.
- Past members: Steve Diggle; John Maher; Dave Farrow; Dave "D.P." Prescott; Gary Hamer; Mark Burke; Steve Mac; Dean Sumner; John Caine; Gaz Connor; Chris Goodwin; Andy Couzens

Flag of Convenience were a rock group formed in 1982 by former Buzzcocks members Steve Diggle and John Maher, along with bassist Dave Farrow and keyboard player Dave "D.P." Prescott. Through their first two line-ups they were managed by the writer and music critic Michael Gray, shortly after his personal management of Gerry Rafferty. Hence the band's first single was produced by Rafferty's co-producer Hugh Murphy. The band continued with changing line-ups until 1989, with later incarnations releasing records under the names F.O.C. and Buzzcocks F.O.C. The final incarnation of the band included former member of the Stone Roses Andy Couzens and former Inspiral Carpets drummer Chris Goodwin, who both went on to form the High. The band ended when Diggle joined Pete Shelley in a re-formed Buzzcocks, the reunion prompted by controversy over the use of "Buzzcocks" in the billing of Diggle's band.

In a review of the 'best of' compilation The Secret Public Years 1981-1989, AllMusic described the later F.O.C. work as proof that Diggle was "one of the most important and overlooked artists in all of Britain during the '80s".

== Discography ==
=== Singles and EPs ===
- "Life on the Telephone" (1982) Sire
- "Change" (1984) Weird Sisters
- "New House" (1986) M.C.M.
- "Last Train to Safety" EP (1987) M.C.M.
- "Should I Ever Go Deaf" EP (1987) M.C.M. (as F.O.C.)
- "Exiles" EP (1988) M.C.M. (as F.O.C.)
- "Tomorrow's Sunset" (1989) Thin Line (as Buzzcocks F.O.C.)

=== Studio albums ===
- The Big Secret (1984) Not on label (cassette only)
- Northwest Skyline (1987) M.C.M. (as F.O.C.)
- War on the Wireless Set (1988) MCM America (as F.O.C.) (compilation of outtakes from 1981 to 1986, plus the 1986 single "New House")

=== Compilation albums ===
- The Best of Steve Diggle and Flag of Convenience - The Secret Public Years 1981-1989 (1994) Anagram (as Steve Diggle and the Flag of Convenience)
- Here's One I Made Earlier - Best of Steve Diggle, Flag of Convenience, F.O.C. and Buzzcocks F.O.C. (1995) Ax-s (as Steve Diggle)
