= C6.org =

Defunct UK art collective

c6.org was an international media art and street art collective centred in London active from 1997 to 2010.

The group combined graffiti, new media art and performance art with political commentary throughout the 90s.

The founder of the group Leon Sessix also makes street art and stencil graffiti under the name Dotmasters.

The name originated from a roundtable discussion, Tudor Watson arrived late to the meeting, they were deciding on a name and there were six people present, so he said, how about 'See Six', which became 'c6'.
