= Harmony in My Head =

Single by Buzzcocks
- B-side: "Something's Gone Wrong Again"
- Released: 6 July 1979 (UK)
- Genre: Punk rock
- Length: 3:06
- Label: United Artists
- Songwriter(s): Steve Diggle

Buzzcocks singles chronology
"Everybody's Happy Nowadays" (1979)	"Harmony in My Head" (1979)	"Time's Up EP" (1979)

"Harmony in My Head" is a song by Buzzcocks. It was released as a single July 6, 1979, reaching number 32 in the UK Singles Chart. It was written and sung by Steve Diggle. In a 2006 interview with Pitchfork Media, Diggle revealed he had smoked 20 cigarettes to achieve the gruff sound of the vocals.

The song title was also used as the name of a radio show hosted by singer Henry Rollins on Indie 103.1, a Santa Monica, California, FM radio station. Rollins stated in Fanatic, his book about the radio show's first run that "Harmony in My Head" is his favorite Buzzcocks song; appropriately, the Buzzcocks' recording kicked off the first episode of the show. When Rollins relaunched the show after a short hiatus on 27 December 2005, he used a live recording of the same song.

== Track listing ==
1. "Harmony in My Head" (Diggle) – 3:06
2. "Something's Gone Wrong Again" (Shelley) – 4:29
