= Danny Farrant =

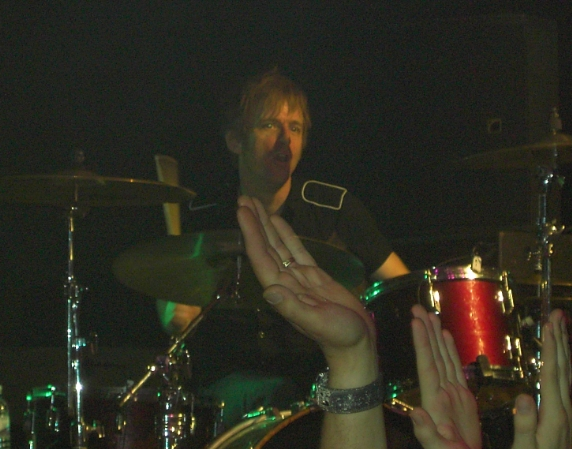
- Danny Farrant performing with Buzzcocks at Beverley Folk Festival in 2008

Background information
- Born: Daniel Farrant; Weston-super-Mare, England
- Genres: Punk rock, new wave
- Occupations: Musician; drummer
- Instrument: Drums
- Label: Cooking Vinyl (as per Buzzcocks)

Danny Farrant is an English musician who is the current drummer for the British punk band Buzzcocks, having joined the group following Phil Barker's departure in 2006.

== Early years ==
He has described the Sex Pistols song "God Save The Queen" as being his biggest inspiration in music. He said: "The energy and venom coming from John Lydon's delivery, coupled with the no-nonsense meat and two veg of the band left everything else in its wake. Every time I hear the intro to that track, the hairs on my neck stand up."

As a schoolboy, Farrant was a member of a short-lived new wave group called Safreak – a name that was culled from a half-erased piece of graffiti. After leaving Safreak, Farrant formed a band called Burning Hearts, which appeared in a battle of the bands-style competition on BBC television's Going Live!.

== Other works ==
Farrant also plays guitar, bass and keyboards. He has also played drums for The Alarm, Spear of Destiny, Bad Manners and Grand National. According to Buzzcocks guitarist and singer Steve Diggle, Farrant had to learn thirty songs in two days when he first joined the band.

He also teaches drums in North London.
