= Buzzcocks =

British punk rock band

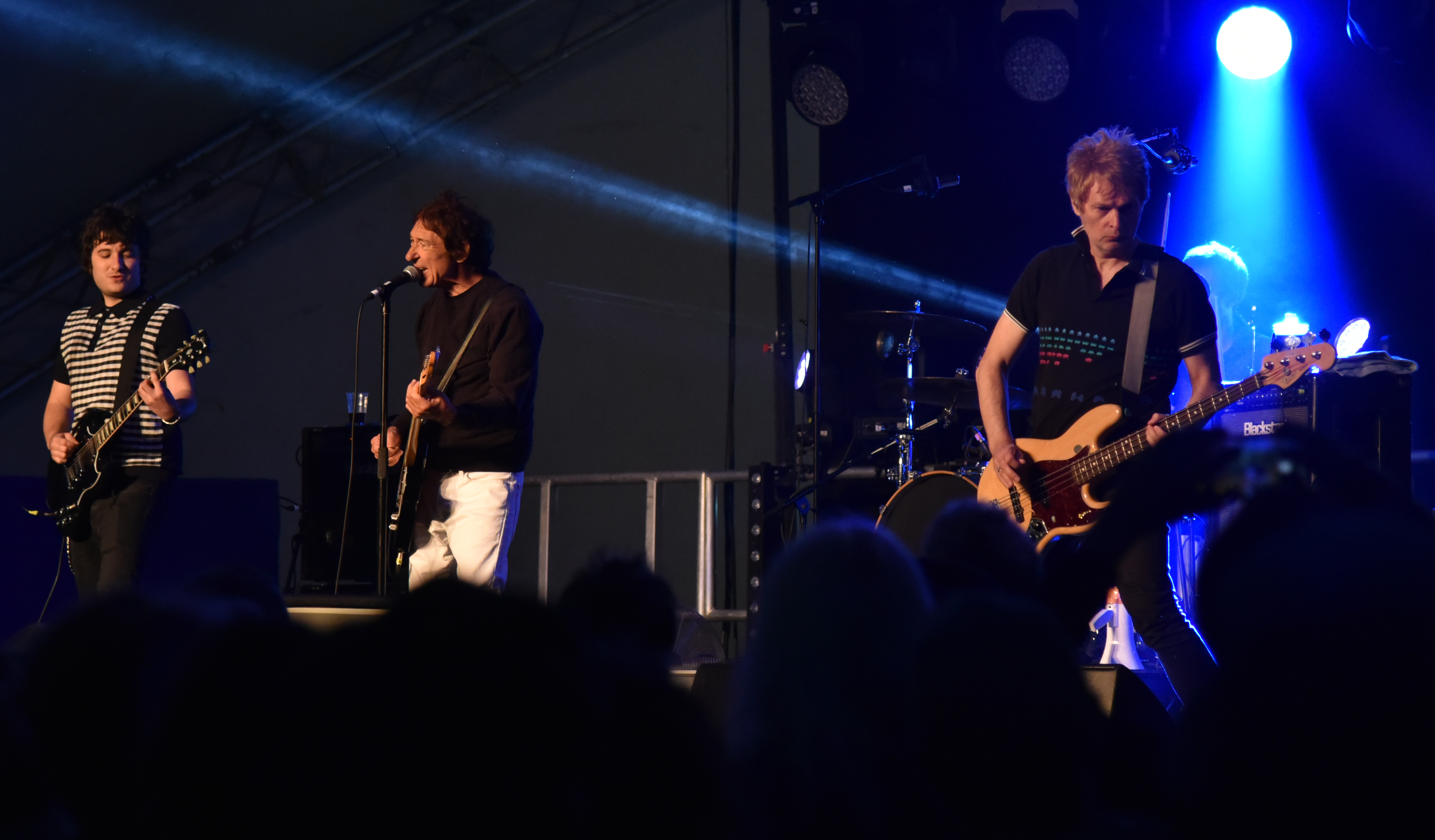
- Buzzcocks in 2022; From left: Mani Perazzoli, Steve Diggle, Chris Remington and Danny Farrant (on drums).

Background information
- Origin: Bolton, Greater Manchester, England
- Genres: Punk rock; pop-punk; new wave; power pop
- Years active: 1976–1981; 1989–present
- Labels: United Artists; I.R.S.; Cooking Vinyl; ROIR; EMI
- Spinoffs: Flag of Convenience; Magazine
- Members: Steve Diggle; Chris Remington; Danny Farrant
- Past members: Pete Shelley; Howard Devoto; Garth Smith; Mick Singleton; John Maher; Barry Adamson; Steve Garvey; Mike Joyce; Tony Barber; Phil Barker
- Website: buzzcocks.com

Buzzcocks are an English punk rock band formed by singer-songwriter and guitarist Pete Shelley and singer-songwriter Howard Devoto in Bolton in 1976. They achieved commercial success with singles that fuse pop with rapid-fire punk energy, inspiring the power pop and pop punk movements; these singles were later collected on Singles Going Steady, an acclaimed compilation album music journalist and critic Ned Raggett described as a "punk masterpiece".

Devoto left the band in 1977 and formed Magazine, after which Pete Shelley became the principal singer-songwriter. The classic line-up of Shelley, Steve Diggle (guitar), Steve Garvey (bass), and John Maher (drums) recorded Buzzcocks' first three albums, after which the band broke up in 1981 following a dispute with their record label. The band reunited in 1989 and released six more albums before Shelley's death in 2018. During that time, the band notably released four albums between 1993 and 2006 with the line-up of Shelley, Diggle, Tony Barber (bass) and Phil Barker (drums). The band has remained active, being anchored by long-time guitarist Diggle, who has since also assumed lead vocal duties. As of 2019, the band consists of Diggle, Danny Farrant (drums), and Chris Remington (bass), with Mani Perazzoli (guitar, backing vocals) as an additional touring member. This line-up appears on the band's subsequent and most recent studio albums Sonics in the Soul (2022) and Attitude Adjustment (2026).

== Career ==
=== Early years ===
Howard Trafford, a student at Bolton Institute of Technology who had been involved in electronic music, placed a notice in the college looking for musicians to play the Velvet Underground's song "Sister Ray". Fellow student Peter McNeish, who had played in a rock band called Jets of Air, responded to the notice.

By late 1975, Trafford and McNeish had recruited a drummer and formed an early version of what would become Buzzcocks. The band formed in February 1976; McNeish assumed the stage name Pete Shelley and Trafford named himself Howard Devoto.

Devoto and Shelley chose the name "Buzzcocks" after reading the headline "It's the Buzz, Cock!" in a review of the television series Rock Follies in Time Out magazine. The "buzz" is the excitement of playing on stage and "cock" is northern English slang meaning "friend". They thought the name captured the excitement of the nascent punk scene and had humorous sexual connotations following Pete Shelley's time working in a Bolton adult shop.

Buzzcocks performed live for the first time on 1 April 1976 at their college. Garth Davies played bass guitar and Mick Singleton, who also played in local band Black Cat Bone, played drums.

After reading an NME review of the Sex Pistols' first performance, in February 1976, Shelley and Devoto travelled to High Wycombe together to see the band. Shelley and Devoto were impressed by the show and arranged for the Sex Pistols to perform at the Lesser Free Trade Hall in Manchester on 4 June 1976. Buzzcocks intended to play at this concert but the other musicians dropped out, and Shelley and Devoto were unable to recruit replacements in time for the gig. Once they had recruited bass guitarist Steve Diggle and drummer John Maher, Buzzcocks made their debut opening for the Sex Pistols' second Manchester concert on 20 July 1976 at the same venue. A brief clip of Devoto-era Buzzcocks performing the Troggs' "I Can't Control Myself" appears in the documentary Punk: Attitude, which was directed by Don Letts. Buzzcocks made their London debut at The Screen on the Green in support of the Clash and the Sex Pistols, while the next month they played the two-day 100 Club Punk Festival, which was organised by Malcolm McLaren, and would later replace the Damned on the Anarchy in the UK Tour.

In between these live performances, Buzzcocks began developing their own material and recorded an 11-track demo at Stockport Studios which was eventually released in 1991. By the end of the year, Buzzcocks had recorded and released a four-track EP called Spiral Scratch, which they released on their own label New Hormones, making them one of the first punk groups to establish an independent record label. The EP was produced by Martin Hannett at Indigo Sound Studios; the music was roughly recorded, insistently repetitive and energetic. The EP was re-released in September 1979 and reached number 31 in the charts.

In March 1977, Devoto announced his departure from the band, expressing his dissatisfaction at the direction punk was taking in his statement: "I don't like movements. What was once unhealthily fresh is now a clean old hat". He returned to college for a year then formed a band called Magazine. Pete Shelley took on the vocal duties for Buzzcocks and moved away from social commentary to adolescent themes. Steve Diggle switched from bass to guitar, and Garth Davies—also known as Garth Smith—rejoined Buzzcocks to play bass. The band joined the Clash as support on their White Riot tour.

=== Mainstream success ===
The new line-up signed with United Artists Records (UA) at Electric Circus, Manchester, on 16 August 1977, the day Elvis Presley died. The first UA Buzzcocks single "Orgasm Addict" was released in October 1977; It was the start of a collaboration with producer Martin Rushent that would last until the end of the decade. The band embarked on a headlining tour, during which Smith was found to be unreliable and was replaced with Steve Garvey.

Buzzcocks' next single "What Do I Get?", which was released in February 1978, reached number 37 in the UK chart. It was followed the next month by their debut album Another Music in a Different Kitchen, which reached number 15 in the chart. In May, the band embarked on the Entertaining Friends tour while a third single "I Don't Mind" reached number 55 in the singles chart. In July, a fourth single "Love You More" reached number 34. The band spent mid 1978 recording their second album Love Bites, which reached number 13 in the chart. After a 26-date UK tour, Buzzcocks gained success as their single "Ever Fallen in Love (With Someone You Shouldn't've)" reached number 12 in the UK chart in October 1978. In December, the band released the single "Promises", which reached number 20 in the UK chart. The single's B-side "Lipstick" shared the same ascending progression of notes in its chorus as Magazine's first single "Shot By Both Sides", which was released earlier that year.

In 1979, Buzzcocks prepared for their first European tour while working on new material. In March, the band released the single "Everybody's Happy Nowadays", which reached number 29 in the chart. The tour that followed culminated at Hammersmith Odeon; the concert was recorded and released in 1992 as Entertaining Friends. in mid 1979, the band completed the recording of their third album while a second single "Harmony in my Head" reached number 32 in August. Prior to their first venture to the US, I.R.S. Records released the band's singles compilation Singles Going Steady there.

The band's third album A Different Kind of Tension was released the end of September 1979 and reached number 26 in the chart while the band completed a second UK tour. The album's single "You Say You Don't Love Me" failed to chart. A period of inactivity lasted until September 1980 when the double-A side "Why She's A Girl From the Chainstore/Are Everything" was released. It reached number 61 and was the band's last charting single. Two further singles "Strange Thing" and "What Do You Know?" failed to chart while the band embarked on a truncated UK tour.

=== Break-up and reunion ===
After recording demos for a fourth album, Buzzcocks disbanded in 1981; Shelley took up a solo career, and Diggle and Maher formed Flag of Convenience and released several singles between 1982 and 1989. Garvey formed Motivation and joined Blue Orchids, moving to New York shortly afterwards to continue with Motivation. Maher had joined Wah! by the time Buzzcocks broke up; as of 2012, he owned John Maher Racing, a vintage Volkswagen performance-tuning workshop on the Isle of Harris, Scotland.

Between 1988 and 1989, EMI re-released much of Buzzcocks' back catalogue on Compact Disc (CD), as well as a Peel Sessions album and a box set called Product. This prompted the band to reform with the original line-up for a world tour. Maher was briefly replaced with Smiths drummer Mike Joyce. In 1991, Buzzcocks released new material on the four-track EP Alive Tonight. In the US, interest in the band increased after I.R.S. Records released the compilation album Operator's Manual: Buzzcocks Best. It was followed two years later by the fourth studio album Trade Test Transmissions.

In 1992, bassist Tony Barber and drummer Phil Barker joined Buzzcocks; this line-up toured with Nirvana in 1994, one of Nirvana's last tours. In 1996, Buzzcocks released the live album French, which was recorded in Paris the previous year. Also in 1996, the band's fifth studio album All Set was released. Buzzcocks continued to tour and in September 1999, they released the album Modern.

=== 21st century ===
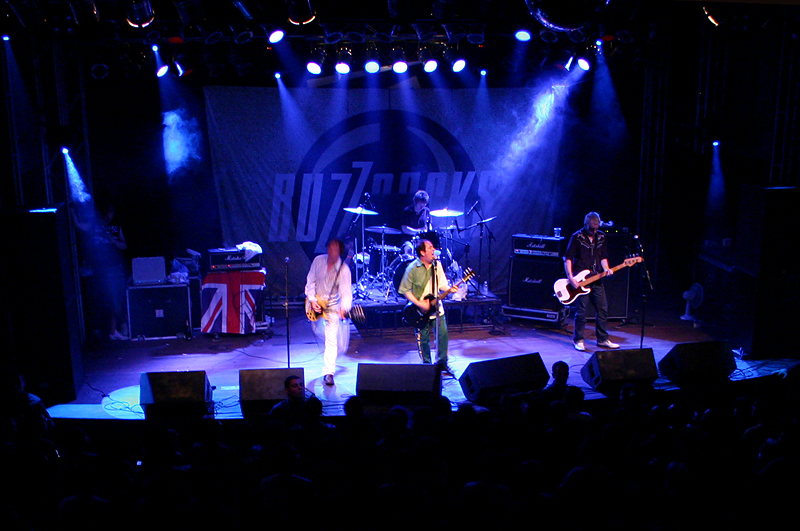
Buzzcocks performing in Porto Alegre, Brazil, 2006

In 2000, Mute Records released the 1976 demos that were recorded while Devoto was in the band as Time's Up, which had long been available as a bootleg. This album includes alternative takes of all the tracks from the EP Spiral Scratch and early versions of tracks that later appeared on Another Music in a Different Kitchen.

In 2002, Shelley and Devoto collaborated for the first time since 1976, producing the album Buzzkunst, Kunst being the German word for "Art". The album is a mix of electronic music and punk. Buzzcocks toured as support for Pearl Jam in 2003 and released their seventh, self-titled studio album.

In 2005, as a tribute to BBC Radio 1 disc jockey John Peel, Shelley re-recorded "Ever Fallen in Love (With Someone You Shouldn't've)" with a group including Roger Daltrey, David Gilmour, Peter Hook, Elton John, Robert Plant and several contemporaneous bands. Proceeds from the single were donated to Amnesty International. Shelley also performed the song live with Plant, Daltrey, Gilmour, Hook and Jeff Beck at the 2005 UK Music Hall of Fame.

In April 2006, Barker left Buzzcocks and was replaced with Danny Farrant. In March 2006, the band released their eighth studio album Flat-Pack Philosophy on Cooking Vinyl Records. On the supporting tour, Buzzcocks played on a leg of the mid-2006 Vans Warped Tour and made an appearance at Maxïmo Park's homecoming gig in Newcastle upon Tyne on 15 December 2007. In April 2008, Barber left the band and was replaced with Chris Remington.

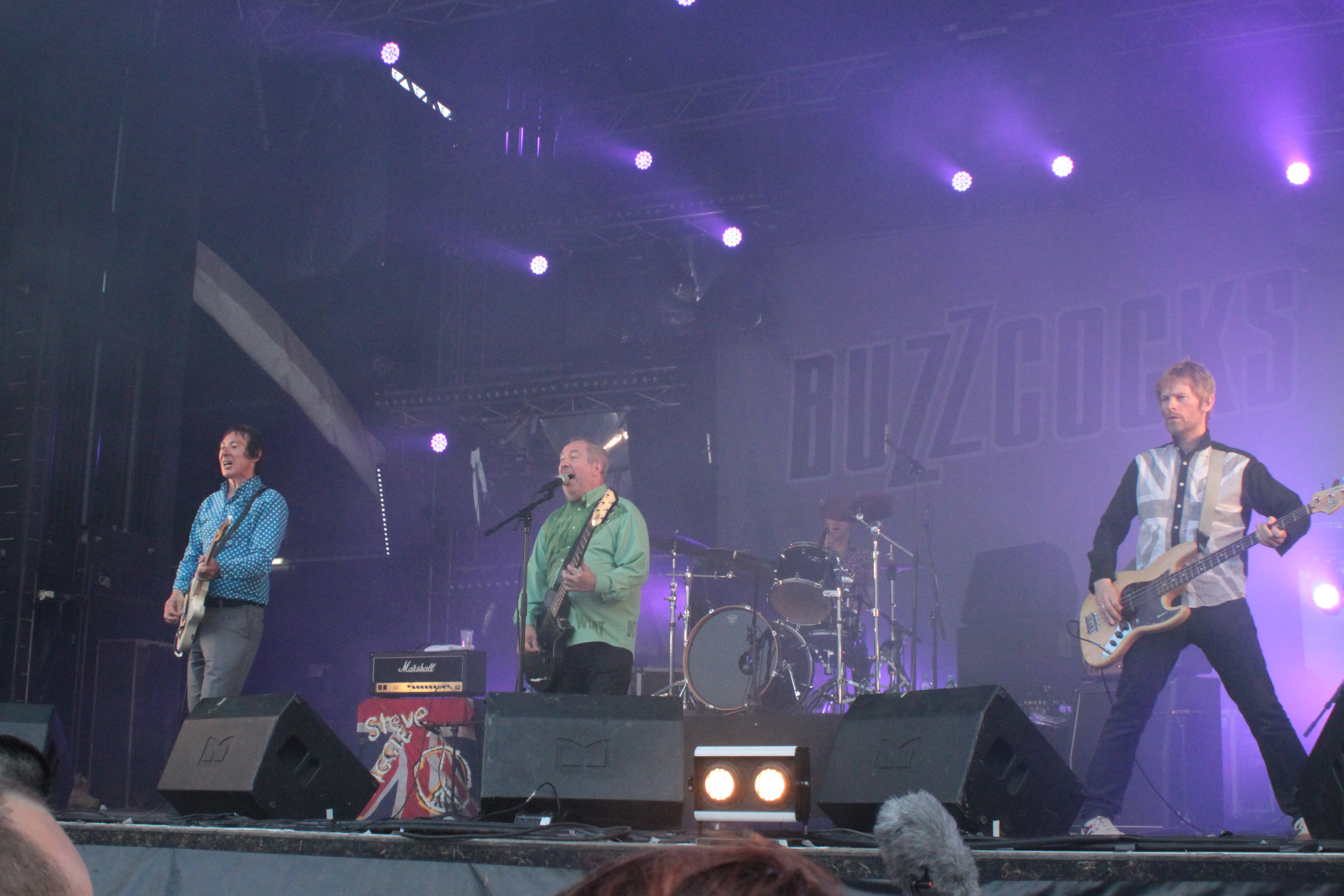
Left to right: Steve Diggle, Pete Shelley, Danny Farrant and Chris Remington, performing live at Hellfest 2013.

In January 2009, Buzzcocks embarked on a UK and European tour, the "Another Bites Tour", in which they played their first two albums in full, as well as an encore of their other hits.

In the same year, Buzzcocks played in Serbia for the second time at the EXIT festival in Novi Sad. Their song "Why Can't I Touch It" was played in the second episode of the sixth season of the television series Entourage. On 9 November 2009, Buzzcocks gave a performance on a small balcony overlooking Dame Street, Dublin, for the viral music show BalconyTV.

In December 2009, the band played as the main support act for the Courteeners. In August 2011, they headlined the first night of The Rhythm Festival in Bedfordshire.

On 25 May 2012 in Manchester at the O2 Apollo and on 26 May in Brixton at the O2 Academy, Buzzcocks performed with the original line-up, including Devoto. On 26 May 2012, the band announced for the first time they would headline Thursday night at Empress Ballroom at Rebellion Festival in Blackpool, performing with Rancid, Public Image Limited and Social Distortion.

On 1 May 2014, Buzzcocks released the album The Way via PledgeMusic. On 13 September 2014, they played "a brief but triumphant set" at Riot Fest in Chicago, Illinois, US. In October 2014, they toured the UK for three weeks with the Dollyrots as main support.

In 2016, the band embarked on their 40th-anniversary tour "Buzzcocks 40". In 2017, "Why Can't I Touch It" was featured in the opening segment of the Telltale game 'Guardians of the Galaxy.

=== Shelley's death and aftermath ===
Pete Shelley died on 6 December 2018 from a suspected heart attack at his home in Tallinn, Estonia.

In June 2019, Buzzcocks performed with several guest vocalists as a tribute to Shelley. The concert had been planned before his death. Steve Diggle said that Buzzcocks would continue, with the post-Shelley Buzzcocks being a "new era". Sonics in the Soul, the band's first album without Shelley, was released in September 2022. It featured Diggle on all vocals, and included a tribute to Shelley in the form of the track "You've Changed Everything Now".

== Musical style and influences ==
Buzzcocks are a punk rock band that exhibit "crisp melodies", "driving guitars" and "biting lyrics", according to Mark Deming of AllMusic. He goes on to say that instead of drawing on political lyrical themes, the band "brought an intense, brilliant vigor to the three-minute pop song, powered by Shelley's alternately funny and anguished lyrics about adolescence and love, backed by melodies and hooks that were concise and memorable." Steve Taylor in The A to X of Alternative Music says Buzzcocks' distinctive sound combines "trademark wall of sound guitars" and "resignedly realist lyrics", which set "the benchmark for the British indie scene to follow".

The band have cited several bands as influences, including the Velvet Underground, the Stooges, and Ramones.

== Legacy ==
Buzzcocks have influenced American punk, hardcore, and indie rock acts, as well as Dead Kennedys guitarist East Bay Ray, Parquet Courts, Hüsker Dü, Superchunk, and Dag Nasty. The Smiths' Johnny Marr has stated that Buzzcocks influenced them "massively in the way we approached our record sleeves and our choice of independent record company – because of the Buzzcocks we took on a Mancunian DIY ethic."

Buzzcocks' name was combined with the title of Sex Pistols' album Never Mind the Bollocks, Here's the Sex Pistols to create the title of the long-running UK comedy television panel game show Never Mind the Buzzcocks. Diggle said in his autobiography he and Shelley only granted the BBC use of their name under the impression it would be a one-off, probably unsuccessful, pilot, and that they are now mildly disgruntled the name is more readily associated in Britain with the series than with their band. Shelley appeared on the programme in 2000, when host Mark Lamarr introduced Shelley by saying without Buzzcocks "there'd be no Smiths or Radiohead, and this show would be called Never Mind Joan Armatrading ".

Mark Deming of AllMusic called Buzzcocks "one of the best, most influential punk bands of all time". The staff of Consequence ranked the band at number 5 on their list of "The 100 Best Pop Punk Bands" in 2019.

== Band members ==
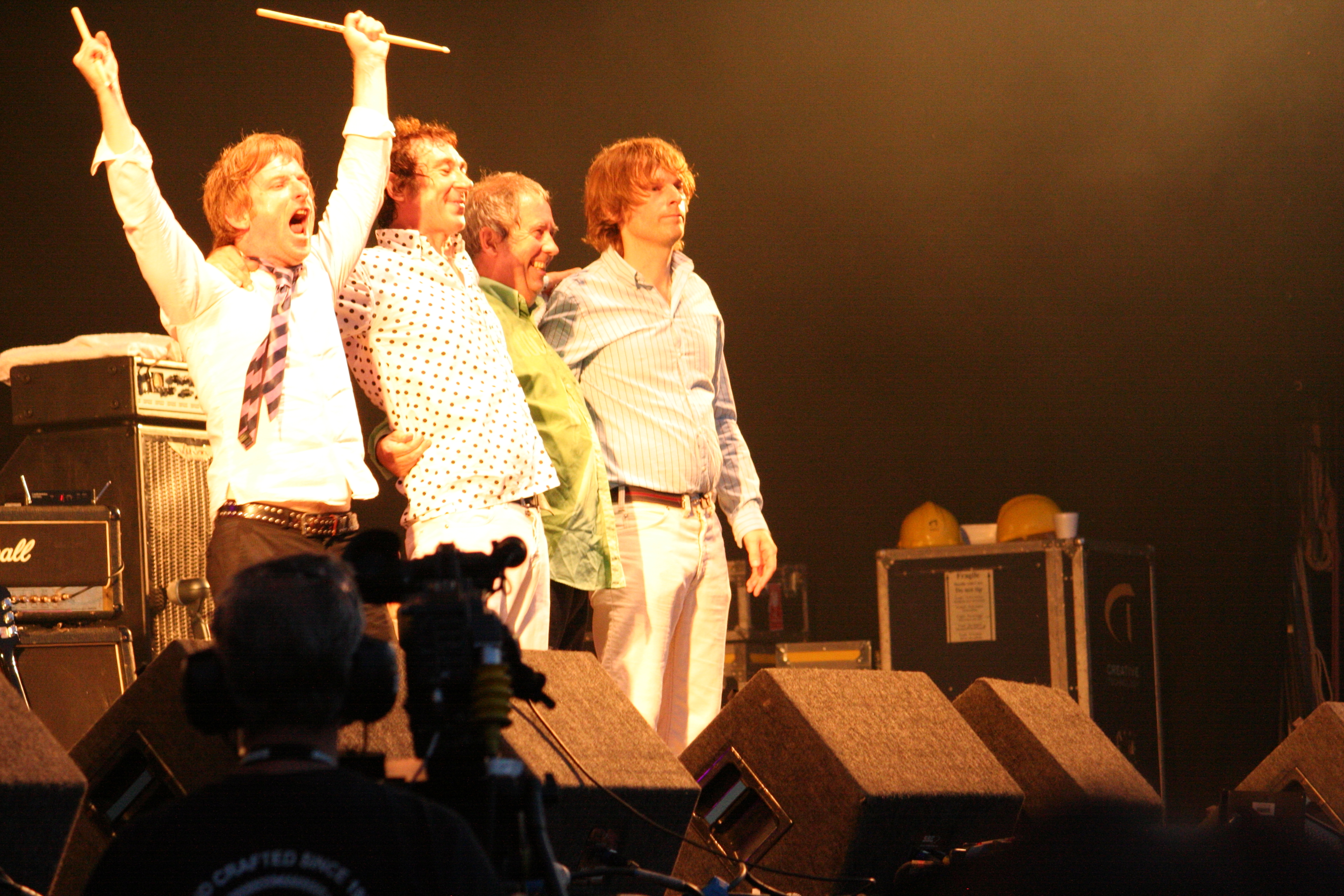
Band photo, at the Cropredy Festival, 13 August 2009

Current

- Steve Diggle – guitars (1977–1981, 1989–present), lead vocals (1978–1981, 1989–present); bass (1976–1977)
- Danny Farrant – drums (2006–present)
- Chris Remington – bass (2008–present)

Touring

- Mani Perazzoli – guitars, backing vocals (2019–present)

Former

- Pete Shelley – guitars, vocals (1976–1981, 1989–2018; his death)
- Howard Devoto – lead vocals (1976–1977, 2012)
- Garth Smith – bass (1976, 1977)
- Mick Singleton – drums (1976)
- John Maher – drums (1976–1981, 1989, 1992, 2012), backing vocals (1977–1978)
- Steve Garvey – bass (1977–1981, 1989–1992, 2012)
- Mike Joyce – drums (1990–1991)
- Steve Gibson – drums (1992)
- Tony Barber – bass (1992–2008)
- Phil Barker – drums (1992–2006)

Timeline

== Discography ==
=== Studio albums ===
- Another Music in a Different Kitchen (1978)
- Love Bites (1978)
- A Different Kind of Tension (1979)
- Trade Test Transmissions (1993)
- All Set (1996)
- Modern (1999)
- Buzzcocks (2003)
- Flat-Pack Philosophy (2006)
- The Way (2014)
- Sonics in the Soul (2022)
- Attitude Adjustment (2026)
