= Tony Barber (bassist) =

- Born: Anthony Barber; 20 April 1963 (age 63); Edmonton, London, England
- Genres: Post-punk; punk rock; alternative rock
- Years active: 1979–present
- Label: Poptones

Anthony Barber (born 20 April 1963) is a former bassist of the British punk rock band Buzzcocks.

He was a member of post-punk band Lack of Knowledge between 1979 and 1985 and Boys Wonder between 1987 and 1988. He joined Buzzcocks in 1992. He also played on The T4 Project's 2008 album entitled Story-Based Concept Album.

He has also released solo material under the name Airport, including the Lift Off with Airport album in 2001 on the Poptones label.

Barber has also produced records for P.P. Arnold and the Soul Destroyers, Denim, and Idha as well as played live in such groups as The Alarm, Alternative TV, The Creation, Chelsea, Rich Kids, Go-Kart Mozart, and U.K. Subs.

Barber is a supporter of animal welfare efforts. During a January 2009 radio interview on Pets In The City on Pet Life Radio, he spoke candidly about his life as a musician, the numerous punk rock musicians he played with over the years, and his production work with a number of new bands. Barber also talked about his involvement in animal rescue efforts.

== Solo discography ==
as Airport

- International Sham EP (1997), Edmonton Green
- Lift Off with Airport (2001), Poptones
