= Steve Diggle =

English rock guitarist

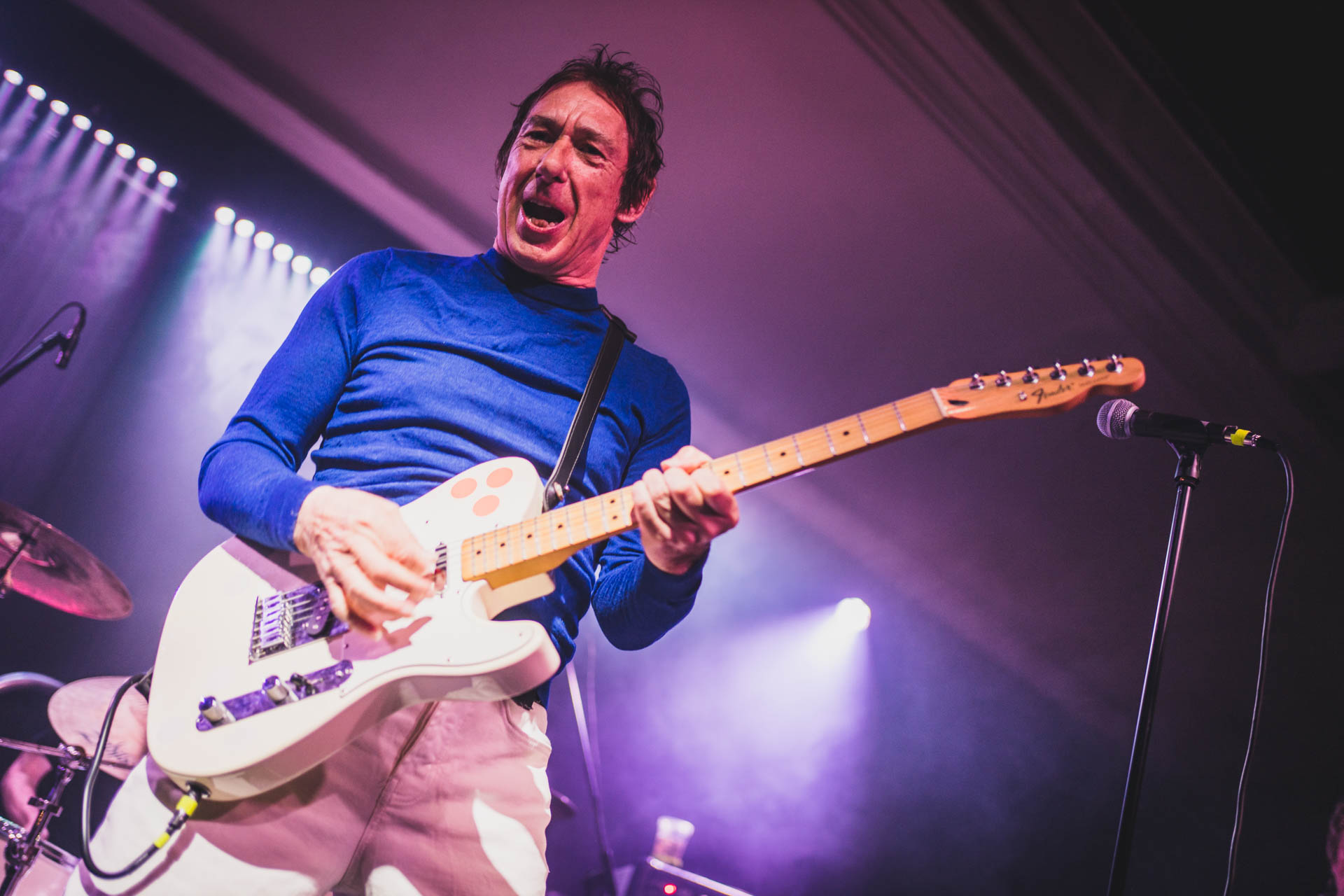
- Diggle with Buzzcocks in 2022

Background information
- Born: Stephen E. Diggle; 7 May 1955 (age 71); Manchester, England
- Genres: Rock, punk rock, pop punk
- Instruments: Vocals, guitar, bass guitar
- Years active: 1976–present
- Label: EMI
- Website: stevediggle.co.uk

Stephen E. Diggle (born 7 May 1955) is an English musician best known as a guitarist and later lead vocalist in the punk band Buzzcocks.

In 1976, Diggle was recruited as a bassist for Buzzcocks, playing bass on the Spiral Scratch EP (1977). Following the departure of original lead vocalist Howard Devoto soon after, Diggle switched to guitar while Pete Shelley, became lead vocalist. He became a member of the band's classic lineup, playing on Buzzcocks' first three albums as well as their acclaimed compilation Singles Going Steady (1979).

Following the group's breakup in 1981, Diggle formed a new band, Flag of Convenience in 1982 before disbanding it in 1989 when Buzzcocks re-formed. Following Shelley's death in 2018, Diggle has become the band's new lead vocalist. With the release of Sonics in the Soul (2022), he is the only member to have played on all of the group's albums and EPs. He has also released four solo albums between 2000 and 2016.

== Biography ==
=== Early years ===
Diggle was born on 7 May 1955 at Saint Mary's Hospital in Manchester, and grew up in the Bradford and Rusholme areas of the city, where he was a mod. After attending Oldham College, he worked in a foundry, but was dismissed for refusing piece work, causing a strike.

=== Buzzcocks ===
He attended the Sex Pistols gig at Manchester's Lesser Free Trade Hall on the 4th of June 1976. Their manager Malcolm McLaren introduced him to guitarist Pete Shelley and vocalist Howard Devoto, who were looking for a bassist for their band, Buzzcocks. John Maher joined as drummer and six weeks later, Buzzcocks played their first concert. Steve played bass at several concerts and on the Spiral Scratch EP. Howard Devoto left Buzzcocks shortly after the EP was released, which prompted the band to reshuffle – Pete Shelley becoming lead vocalist as well as guitarist and Diggle switching from bass to guitar.

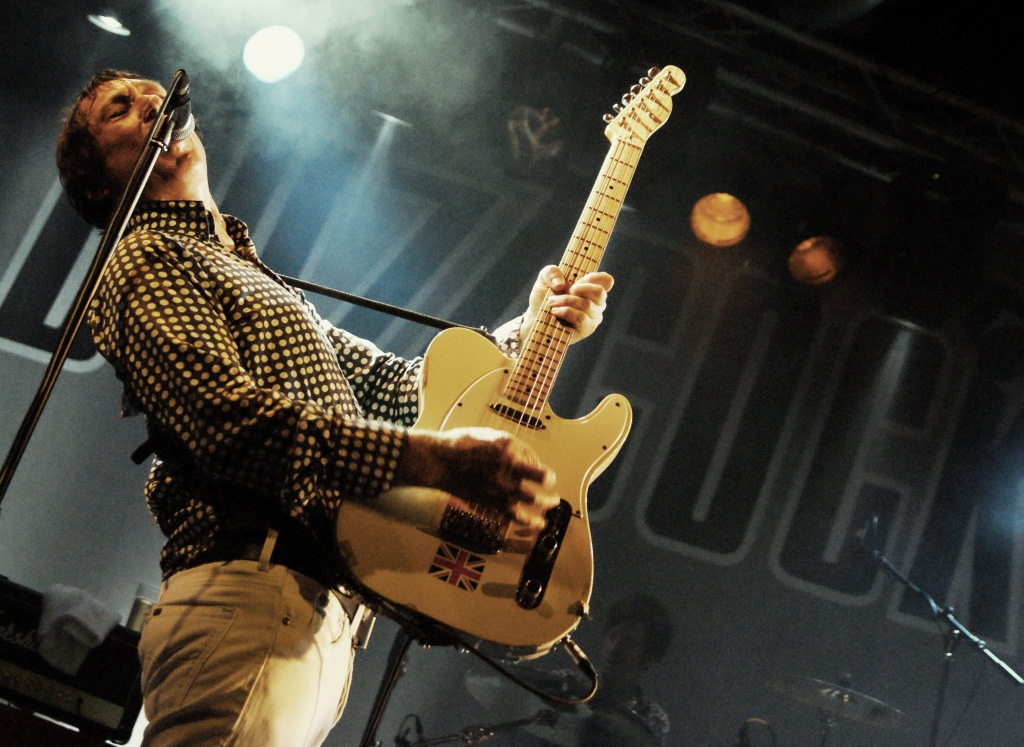
Steve Diggle onstage with Buzzcocks in Holmfirth, 2011

Steve Diggle has written numerous songs for Buzzcocks, including "Autonomy", "Fast Cars" (music by Diggle with lyrics later added by Devoto and Shelley), "Love Is Lies" (the first Buzzcocks song featuring an acoustic guitar), "Why Can't I Touch It?" (co-written with Shelley, Garvey and Maher), "Why She's A Girl From The Chainstore", "Running Free" and, perhaps his most famous, "Harmony in My Head", a Top 40 hit in 1979.

=== Early solo career and Flag of Convenience ===
After Buzzcocks split in 1981, Diggle was briefly a solo artist, releasing the 50 Years of Comparative Wealth EP (with the guest participations of fellow-Buzzcocks Steve Garvey and John Maher) the same year. In 1982, he formed a new band, Flag of Convenience with ex-Buzzcock John Maher. Ex-Easterhouse drummer Gary Rostock played on Diggle's 2000 album Some Reality, released on Diggle's own label, 3:30 Records. In 2013, Diggle also appeared in the British punk-pop comedy Vinyl, playing himself.

=== Buzzcocks reunion to present ===
In 1989, beside Shelley, Maher and Garvey, Diggle reunited with the former classic Buzzcocks line-up for a tour of America. Although first Maher and then Garvey would eventually leave the band, Diggle and Shelley continued touring, writing and recording as Buzzcocks with different members for the next 29 years, recording another six albums between 1993 and 2014.

Following the death of Shelley in December 2018, Diggle led both old and new Buzzcocks line-ups at a tribute concert to Shelley at London's Royal Albert Hall the following June. In its wake he announced his decision to continue the band as its main frontman. In 2022 Buzzcocks released their tenth album, Sonics in the Soul, the first to be entirely written and sung by Diggle.

In a May 2024 interview with Mojo magazine, Diggle revealed he is currently writing the eleventh Buzzcocks album for future release. He has also completed a memoir, Autonomy - Portrait of a Buzzcock, published in August 2024 through Omnibus Press.

== Discography ==
=== Solo albums ===
- Some Reality (2000, 3:30)
- Serious Contender (2005, 3:30)
- Air Conditioning (2010, 3:30)
- Inner Space Times (2016, 3:30)

=== Compilations ===
- The Best of Steve Diggle and Flag of Convenience – The Secret Public Years 1981–1989 (1994, Anagram)
- Here's One I Made Earlier – Best of Steve Diggle, Flag of Convenience, F.O.C. and Buzzcocks F.O.C. (1995, AX-S)
- Wheels of Time (2016, 3:30) (Four-CD box set featuring all four Diggle solo albums)

=== Singles and EPs ===
- 50 Years of Comparative Wealth E.P. (7-inch EP) (1981, Liberty)
- Heated and Rising EP (1993, 3:30)
