= Trotter (surname) =

Trotter is an English surname. It is an occupational surname given to couriers or messengers, derived from Middle English trot, meaning "to walk fast". In some cases, it is derived from the Middle High German word Trotte, meaning winepress, and thus is an occupational surname given to grape treaders.

Notable people with the name include:

- Alessandro Trotter (1874–1967), Italian naturalist known by the botanical author abbreviation "Trotter"
- Alex Trotter (1893–1948), English footballer who played on the left wing
- Alys Fane Trotter (1860s–1961), Irish poet and artist
- Ann Trotter (1932–2022), New Zealand historian
- Barrie Trotter (born 1960), Australian rules footballer
- Barrett Trotter (born 1989), American football quarterback
- Bill Trotter (1908–1984), Major League Baseball pitcher
- Brian Trotter (born 1943), British philatelist
- Brock Trotter (born 1987), Canadian ice hockey centre
- Charles Trotter (1923–2003), Kenyan sports shooter
- Charlie Trotter (1959–2013), American chef and restaurateur
- Chris Trotter (born 1956), New Zealand political commentator, editor and speaker
- Christopher Trotter (born 1967), Australian sculptor
- David Trotter (born 1986), Australian rules footballer
- Decatur Trotter (1932–2004), American politician from Maryland
- DeeDee Trotter (born 1982), American track and field athlete
- Desmond Trotter (born 2000), American football quarterback
- Donne Trotter (born 1950), American politician from Illinois
- Edward Trotter (disambiguation), multiple people
- Fred Robert Trotter (1861–1934), Canadian farmer and politician from Nova Scotia
- Frederick Murray Trotter (1897–1968) British geologist
- Gerald Trotter (1871–1945), British Army officer and courtier
- Geraldine Pindell Trotter (1873–1918), American civil rights activist & editor, wife of Monroe Trotter below
- Gideon Trotter (born 1992), South African sprinter
- Hale Trotter (1931–2022), Canadian-American mathematician
- Harry Trotter (1890–1954), American football coach
- Henry Trotter (disambiguation), multiple people
- India Trotter (born 1985), American soccer player
- Jake Trotter, American sports columnist and author
- James Trotter (disambiguation), multiple people
- Janet Trotter (born 1943), Vice-chancellor of the University of Gloucestershire
- Jeremiah Trotter (born 1977), American football player
- Jeremiah Trotter Jr. (born 2002), American football player
- Jimmy Trotter (1899–1984), English football player and manager
- Joe William Trotter Jr. (born 1945), American historian
- John Trotter (disambiguation), multiple people
- Josiah Trotter (born 2005), American football player
- Kate Trotter (born 1953), Canadian actress
- Keith Trotter (born 1962), English cricketer
- Liam Trotter (born 1988), English footballer
- Lilias Trotter (1853–1928), artist and Christian missionary to Algeria
- Margaret Trotter (born 1931), New Zealand community leader and philanthropist
- Mel Trotter (1870–1940), American fundamentalist missionary
- Michael Trotter (born 1969), English footballer
- Monroe Trotter (1872–1934), American newspaper editor and civil rights activist
- Neville Trotter (1932–2026), British Conservative politician
- Obie Trotter (born 1984), basketball player
- Percy Trotter (1883–1959), Australian rules footballer
- Peter Trotter (1956–2014), Australian Paralympic wheelchair racer
- Rick Trotter, American public address announcer for the Memphis Grizzlies
- Robert Trotter (1930–2013), Scottish actor, director, and photographer
- Ron Trotter (1927–2010), New Zealand businessman
- Sonnie Trotter (born 1979), Canadian climber
- Steve Trotter (1963–2022), stunt performer
- Tariq Trotter (born 1971), American hip-hop artist known as Black Thought
- Terry Trotter, American studio pianist
- Thomas Trotter (disambiguation), multiple people
- Tracy Trotter, American cinematographer
- Virginia Trotter (1921–1998), Assistant Secretary of Education
- Wilfred Trotter (1872–1939), British surgeon, a pioneer in neurosurgery, and social psychologist
- William Trotter (disambiguation), multiple people
- Willie Trotter (born 1959), English post-punk musician
- Yorke Trotter (1854–1935), organist and Principal, London Academy of Music

== Fictional characters ==
- Trotter (Lord of the Rings), early name of Aragorn, a character of J.R.R. Tolkien's The Lord of the Rings
- Barry Trotter, main character of three parodies of the Harry Potter series, written by Michael Gerber
- Evie Trotter, heroine of a trilogy by Catherine Cookson
- James Henry Trotter, title character of Roald Dahl's James and the Giant Peach
- Jim Trotter III, District Attorney in My Cousin Vinny
- Job Trotter, character in Dickens's The Pickwick Papers
- Louisa Trotter, heroine of the British series The Duchess of Duke Street
- Trotter family, from the British sitcom Only Fools and Horses

== See also ==
- Trotter (disambiguation)
