= William Otter =

British bishop (1768–1840)

The Right Reverend William Otter
- Bishop of Chichester
- Portrait of Potter, by John Linnell, 1841
- Church: Church of England
- Diocese: Diocese of Chichester
- Elected: 1836
- Term ended: 1840 (death)
- Predecessor: Edward Maltby
- Successor: Philip Nicholas Shuttleworth

Personal details
- Born: 23 October 1768 Cuckney, Nottinghamshire
- Died: 20 August 1840 (aged 71)
- Parents: Dorothy Wright Otter; Rev. Edward Otter
- Spouse: Nancy Sadleir Bruère (m. 1804)
- Children: 8, including William
- Education: Jesus College, Cambridge

William Otter (23 October 1768 – 20 August 1840) was the first Principal of King's College, London, who later served as Bishop of Chichester.

== Early life ==
William Otter was born at Cuckney, Nottinghamshire on 23 October 1768, the son of Dorothy (née Wright) Otter (d. 1772) and the Rev. Edward Otter. He was educated at Jesus College, Cambridge, where he was later made a fellow.

== Career ==
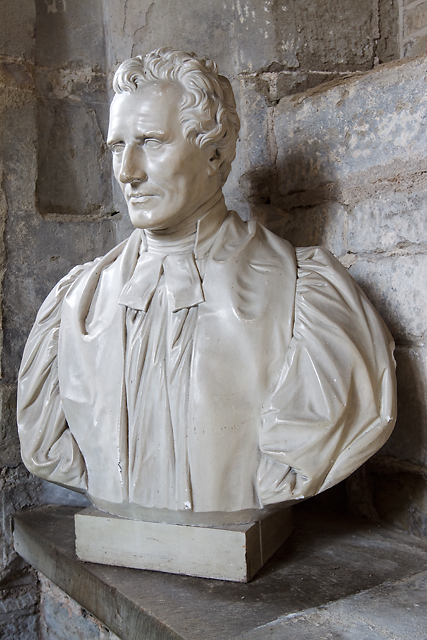
Bust of William Otter in St John the Baptist's Kinlet

He was appointed Principal of the newly established King's College, London, in 1831, and held the post until 1836 when he was appointed Bishop of Chichester. Otter established a small college to train schoolmasters in 1840, which was rebuilt in his memory in 1849 as Bishop Otter College. The college failed in 1867 and it was relaunched in 1873 with Fanny Trevor as Lady Principal. It is now the main Bishop Otter Campus of the University of Chichester.

== Personal life ==
On 3 July 1804, he married Nancy Sadleir Bruère in Leatherhead, Surrey. Nancy was a granddaughter of George Bruere, British Governor of Bermuda. Together, they had three sons and five daughters:

- The Ven. William Bruère Otter (1805–1876), the Archdeacon of Lewes who married Elizabeth Melvil (1814–1892).
- Sophia Otter (1807–1889), who married Henry Malthus (1805–1882), son of Thomas Robert Malthus.
- Caroline Charlotte Otter (1809–1855), who married John Romilly, 1st Baron Romilly.
- Jacqueline Elizabeth Otter (1811–1849), who married Alexander Trotter, a banker and stockbroker at Coutts Bank. After her death, he married Isabella Strange, a daughter of Sir Thomas Strange. (Note: The children of Alexander Trotter and his second wife, Isabella Strange (1816–1878), had several additional children including: Isabella Lilias Trotter (1853–1928), Alexander Pelham Trotter (1857–1947) an electrical engineer who married Alys Fane Keatinge, and Margaret Trotter (1850–1942) who married the historian Hugh Edward Egerton (1855–1927).)
- Maria Otter (b. 1814), who married Sir William Milbourne James, Lord Justice of Appeal.
- Alfred William Otter (1815–1866), who married Anna Louisa de la Hooke (1824–1907).
- Amelia Harriet Otter (1817–1890), who married Edward Strutt, 1st Baron Belper.
- Reginald William Ongley Otter (1826–1862)

Otter died on 20 August 1840.

=== Descendants ===
His eldest son William had four sons and six daughters, including Lt. William Otter RN (1840–1870), and was the grandfather of Hugh Otter-Barry, Bishop of Mauritius. Through his son Alfred, he was a grandfather of Gen. William Dillon Otter.

Through his daughter Jacqueline, he was a grandfather of Coutts Trotter (1837–1887), Vice Master of Trinity College, Cambridge, Edward Bush Trotter (1842–1920), Archdeacon of Western Downs, Australia, Col. Sir Henry Trotter. Through his daughter Maria, he was a grandfather of Maj. William Christopher James, who married Effie Gray Millais (the daughter of Effie Gray and John Everett Millais).

Academic offices
Preceded by New position	Principal of King's College London; 1831–1836	Succeeded by Hugh James Rose
Church of England titles
Preceded by Edward Maltby	Bishop of Chichester; 1836–1840	Succeeded by Philip Nicholas Shuttleworth
