= General Trotter =

General Trotter may refer to:

- Gerald Trotter (1871–1945), British Army brigadier general
- Henry Trotter (British Army officer) (1844–1905), British Army major general
- James Trotter (British Army officer) (1849–1940), British Army major general
