= Gerard baronets of Bryn (1611) =

Escutcheon of the Gerard baronets of Bryn

The Gerard baronetcy of Bryn, Lancashire, was created in the Baronetage of England in 1611 for Thomas Ger(r)ard, Member of Parliament for Liverpool in 1597, Lancashire in 1614, and Wigan in 1621. His father Sir Thomas Gerard of Bryn (died 1601) represented Lancashire in 1563, a Catholic landowner on the margins of plots against Elizabeth I. The son was an outwardly-conforming Catholic, an Oxford graduate and courtier.

== Gerard baronets, of Bryn (1611) ==
- Sir Thomas Gerard, 1st Baronet (1560–1621)
- Sir Thomas Gerard, 2nd Baronet (c. 1584–1630)
- Sir William Gerard, 3rd Baronet (1612–1681)
- Sir William Gerard, 4th Baronet (1638–1702)
- Sir William Gerard, 5th Baronet (1662–1721)
- Sir William Gerard, 6th Baronet (1697–1732)
- Sir William Gerard, 7th Baronet (1721–1740)
- Sir Thomas Gerard, 8th Baronet (c. 1723–1780)
- Sir Robert Gerard, 9th Baronet (c. 1725–1784)
- Sir Robert Gerard, 10th Baronet (died 1791)
- Sir William Gerard, 11th Baronet (1773–1826)
- Sir John Gerard, 12th Baronet (1804–1854)
- Sir Robert Gerard, 13th Baronet (1808–1887) (created Baron Gerard in 1876) For the further descent see Baron Gerard.
- Sir Anthony Gerard, 5th Baron Gerard, 17th Baronet (born 1949) (5th Baron Gerard) is the current holder.

== Extended family ==
- John Gerard (Jesuit) (1564–1637) was a younger brother of the 1st Baronet.

== Notes ==
Baronetage of England
Preceded by Clifton baronets	Gerard baronets of Bryn; 22 May 1611	Succeeded by Aston baronets
