= Edward Trotter =

Edward Trotter may refer to:

- Edward Henry Trotter (1872–1916), British Army officer
- Edward Trotter (priest) (1842–1920), Anglican archdeacon
- Edward Kitchener Trotter, a character from Only Fools and Horses known as Grandad
