= Vincent Zhou =

American figure skater (born 2000)

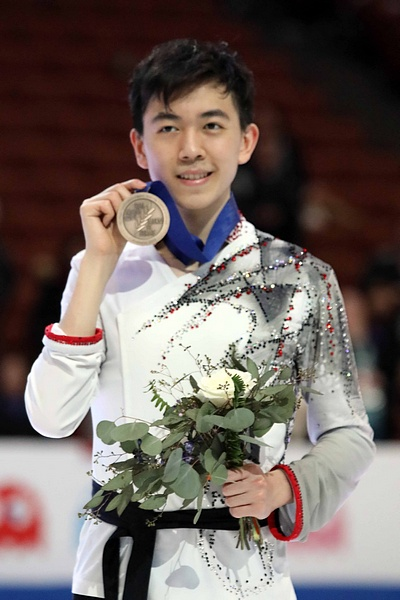
- Zhou at the 2019 Four Continents Championships

Personal information
- Born: October 25, 2000 (age 26) San Jose, California, U.S.
- Home town: Palo Alto, California, U.S.
- Height: 5 ft 9 in (1.75 m)

Figure skating career
- Country: United States
- Discipline: Men's singles
- Coach: Mie Hamada; Tom Zakrajsek; Drew Meekins
- Skating club: Skating Club of San Francisco
- Began skating: 2006
- Highest WS: 3rd (2018-19)
Event	Gold medal – first place	Silver medal – second place	Bronze medal – third place
Olympic Games	1	0	0
World Championships	0	0	2
Four Continents Championships	0	0	1
U.S. Championships	0	3	2
World Team Trophy	1	0	0
World Junior Championships	1	0	0
Medal list
Olympic Games
Gold medal – first place	2022 Beijing	Team
World Championships
Bronze medal – third place	2019 Saitama	Singles
Bronze medal – third place	2022 Montpellier	Singles
Four Continents Championships
Bronze medal – third place	2019 Anaheim	Singles
U.S. Championships
Silver medal – second place	2017 Kansas City	Singles
Silver medal – second place	2019 Detroit	Singles
Silver medal – second place	2021 Las Vegas	Singles
Bronze medal – third place	2018 San Jose	Singles
Bronze medal – third place	2022 Nashville	Singles
World Team Trophy
Gold medal – first place	2019 Fukuoka	Team
World Junior Championships
Gold medal – first place	2017 Taipei	Singles

Vincent Zhou
- Traditional Chinese: 周知方
- Simplified Chinese: 周知方
Transcriptions
Standard Mandarin
- Hanyu Pinyin: Zhōu Zhīfāng

Vincent Zhou (born October 25, 2000) is an American figure skater. He is a 2022 Olympic gold medalist in the team event, a two-time World bronze medalist (2019 and 2022), the 2019 Four Continents bronze medalist, the 2021 Skate America champion, and a three-time U.S. national silver medalist (2017, 2019, 2021). He is also the 2017 World Junior champion and the 2013 U.S. junior national champion.

In February 2018, Zhou became the first skater to successfully perform a quadruple Lutz at the Winter Olympics. He finished in sixth place at the 2018 Winter Olympics.

== Early life and education ==
Vincent Zhou was born in San Jose, California. Both of his parents are originally from China. His older sister, Vivian, is a violinist and diver. His mother, Fei Ge, and his father, Max Zhou, are both computer scientists and worked in Silicon Valley. When Zhou was a baby, his family moved to Palo Alto, California, where they continue to reside. Zhou moved with his mother to Colorado Springs, Colorado in the spring of 2015 and returned to California a year later. He has since returned to Colorado Springs, where he spends most of his time. He had a Siamese tabby cat named Snookie. He volunteers regularly.

Zhou attended Capistrano Connections Academy, an online school, to accommodate his training. He received the Presidential Award for Educational Excellence, a recognition awarded at the sole discretion of his school principal. Zhou enrolled at Brown University in the fall of 2019.

== Skating career ==
=== Early years ===
Zhou started skating in 2005. As a young child, he had lessons with Julie Lowndes and Charlie Tickner. He was coached by Diana Miro at the juvenile level and represented the Peninsula Skating Club until the 2011–2012 season. When he was nine, Zhou started to be coached by Tammy Gambill and became a member of the All Year Figure Skating Club in Riverside, California. Zhou admires Patrick Chan, Brian Boitano, Michael Weiss, Yuzuru Hanyu, and Richard Dornbush.

He won three national titles at different levels in three consecutive years:

- 2011 U.S. intermediate champion (youngest U.S. intermediate champion)
- 2012 U.S. novice champion
- 2013 U.S. junior champion (youngest U.S. junior champion)

Zhou intended to skate at the senior level in the 2013–2014 season, but missed the season due to an injury. He was also forced to sit out the entire 2014–15 season because of a torn lateral meniscus in his right knee and a discoid meniscus. Zhou underwent surgery at the UCSF Orthopedic Institute in San Francisco to get his injuries treated.

In the spring of 2015, Zhou began training at the Broadmoor Skating Club in Colorado Springs, Colorado with Tom Zakrajsek and Becky Calvin as his new coaches. In May 2015, he returned to competition at the Santa Fe Skatefest.

=== 2015–2016 season ===
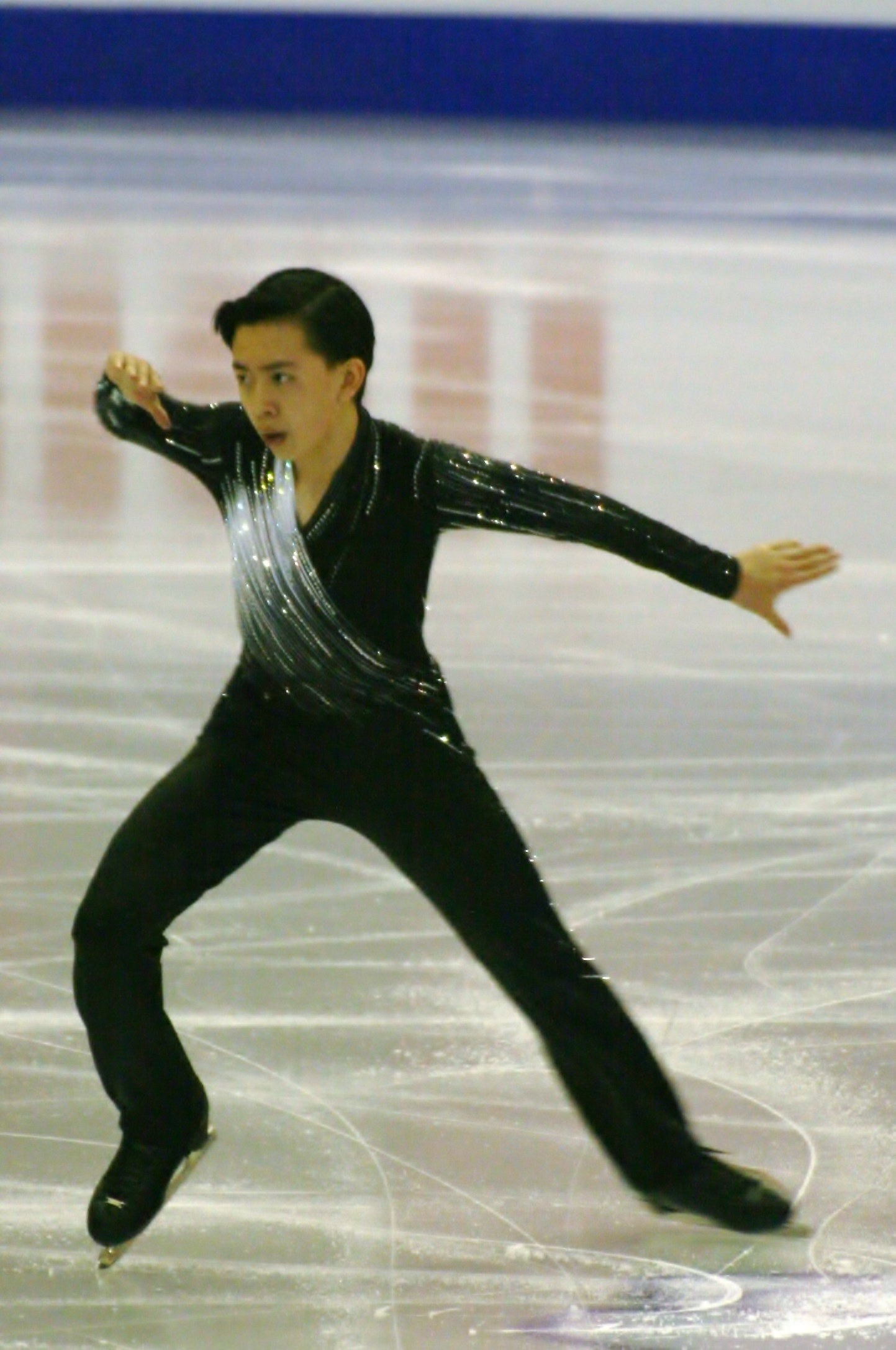
Zhou at the 2015–16 Junior Grand Prix Final

Making his ISU Junior Grand Prix debut, Zhou won two silver medals at the 2015 JGP events in Bratislava, Slovakia, and Linz, Austria. These results qualified him for the 2015–16 JGP Final in Barcelona, where he finished fourth.

In January 2016, Zhou placed 8th on the senior level at the U.S. Championships and was named in the U.S. team to the World Junior Championships in Debrecen, Hungary. He placed fourth in both segments at the March event and fifth overall.

=== 2016–2017 season ===
Zhou changed coaches ahead of the 2016–2017 season, returning to Tammy Gambill. He has continued to train in Colorado Springs with one of his primary coaches, Drew Meekins and Tom Zakrajsek. Starting his season on the Junior Grand Prix series, he won silver in Yokohama, Japan, having ranked first in the short and second in the free behind South Korea's Cha Jun-hwan, and then bronze in Tallinn, Estonia. In December, he made his senior international debut at the 2016 CS Golden Spin of Zagreb but withdrew after the short program.

Competing as a senior, Zhou won the silver medal at the U.S. Championships in January 2017. The following month, he stood on his first senior international podium, taking gold at the Bavarian Open. In March, he won the gold medal at the 2017 World Junior Championships. After placing 5th in the short program, he moved up to win the title with a personal best free skate.

=== 2017–2018 season ===
Zhou opened the season at the Finlandia Trophy, where he scored 6th in the short program, then moved up to a second-place finish behind China's Boyang Jin after winning the free skate. He made his senior Grand Prix debut, having received assignments to the 2017 Cup of China and 2017 Internationaux de France. In China, he scored 8th in the short program and 2nd in the free skate, landing just three points short of the podium; in France, he fell on the quads in his short program, ending up 10th in the short and 9th overall. After intense training and a shoulder dislocation, Zhou headed to the 2018 U.S. Figure Skating Championships, where he attempted a total of seven quadruple jumps. He took 5th in the short program and 3rd in the free skate, taking the bronze medal. His total score was just 0.68 points behind silver medalist Ross Miner.

Alongside Nathan Chen and Adam Rippon, Zhou was named to the U.S. Olympic figure skating team to Pyeongchang, South Korea. During his short program on February 16, he became the first skater to land a quadruple Lutz jump at the Olympics. After the free program, he ultimately placed 6th, behind US national champion Nathan Chen.

In April 2018, Zhou announced on Instagram that he and his choreographer Joshua Farris completed a new exhibition program to A-ha's "Take On Me". Zhou noted he had grown fond of the song while reading Ernest Cline's Ready Player One.

=== 2018–2019 season ===
At his first event of the season, the 2018 CS U.S. International Classic, Zhou placed sixth in the short, first in the free, and fourth overall.

Zhou's assignments for the 2018-19 Grand Prix series are Skate America and NHK Trophy. At the 2018 Skate America, Zhou placed six in the short, third in the free, and fifth overall. At the 2018 NHK Trophy, Zhou placed fifth in the short, fourth in the free, and fourth overall. In late November, Zhou competed at the 2018 CS Tallinn Trophy, where he won the silver medal.

At the 2019 US Championships, he won the silver medal after placing third in the short program and second in the free skate. He said, "I’m happy with the results, but there is still so much room for improvement,” That gives me hope for the future because to achieve what I did this week and still have room for growth is a good thing. I look forward to Four Continents and the World Championships." He was assigned to compete at the 2019 Four Continents Championships in early February and the 2019 World Championships in March.

At the 2019 Four Continents Championships, Zhou ranked first in the short with a personal best score of 100.18 and fifth in the free. He won the bronze medal, achieving his first podium finish at an ISU Championship. Speaking afterward, he said, "I thought that I skated great today. The most important thing that I got from today was the love for the sport. The audience was absolutely incredible, and they helped me feel good about how I skated. I think that I did a good job at this competition and I made many improvements upon my previous performances. I did a very good quad Lutz at the beginning, but then my mind got a little blurry going into the quad Salchow, and that could have been better.".

At the 2019 World Championships, Zhou scored a new season's best of 186.99, placing third in the free skate, and won the bronze medal. Afterward, he stated, "I do not think there is one stone left unturned when it came to the organization itself; everyone here has been so kind and so supportive. I am super proud that I was able to put together two strong performances, and I built upon what has been made on the nationals and Four Continents. To end the season like this is really incredible. It has been the first time since 1996 since two Americans have been on a podium, and I think it is really noteworthy. I am really honored to compete here and having the opportunity to skate here in Japan." Zhou concluded the season as part of the gold medal-winning Team USA at the 2019 World Team Trophy.

=== 2019–2020 season ===
Zhou left his longtime coach Tom Zakrajsek, announcing that he would train with Tammy Gambill in the United States and also with Japanese coach Mie Hamada, who he had been working with for some time previously. Zhou chose to attend Brown University, stating that the curriculum was flexible enough that it would be viable to both skate and study.

Zhou debuted at the 2019 CS U.S. Classic, placing first in the short program but dropping to the bronze medal position after a fourth-place free skate. He withdrew from both of his Grand Prix assignments for the year, stating that they conflicted with adequate preparation for his midterm examinations. In January 2020, Zhou announced that he would take a gap year from Brown University for the following season, and would henceforth be coached by Hamada, Lee Barkell and choreographer Lori Nichol at the Granite Club in Toronto.

Only able to train for approximately four weeks before the 2020 U.S. Championships, he nevertheless placed fourth in the short program. Fourth in the free skate as well, he won the pewter medal. Zhou performed only one quadruple jump in each program, saying that he had only started to land them the week of the competition. Despite his fourth place, he was assigned to one of the United States' three men's berths at the 2020 World Championships. The World Championships were subsequently canceled as a result of the coronavirus pandemic.

=== 2020–2021 season ===
The pandemic caused Zhou to conclude that his coaching arrangement in Toronto was no longer viable due to restrictions on international travel. He parted ways with Barkell, saying he had been refreshed by his time at the Granite Club. With Japan also not an option, he returned to Colorado Springs and former coaches Krall and Zakrajsek. He was assigned to compete at the 2020 Skate America in Las Vegas, the ISU having made Grand Prix assignments based primarily on training location to minimize travel. Zhou placed second in the short program, despite landing his quad Salchow on the quarter mark. He was second in the free skate as well despite falling on his opening underrotated quad Lutz and underrotating another quad Salchow attempt, taking the silver medal behind Nathan Chen and ahead of Keegan Messing. On winning his first Grand Prix medal, he said, "obviously, there were a few hiccups in the program, but overall, I’m really proud of myself for what I did at this competition."

Zhou competed next at the 2021 U.S. Championships, also held in Las Vegas. He placed second in the short program, landing both a quad Lutz and a quad Salchow. Second in the free skate, despite two errors on quad attempts, he won the silver medal. He was assigned to the American team for the 2021 World Championships in Stockholm. At Worlds, Zhou struggled on all three jumping passes in the short program and failed to land a single fully rotated jump. He finished 25th overall and missed qualifying for the free skating segment by less than a quarter of a point. While fellow American skaters Chen and Jason Brown placed first and seventh in the event, Zhou's failure to qualify for the free skate meant that the United States only qualified two men's berths for the 2022 Winter Olympics outright, with the necessity of competing for a third later in the year at the 2021 CS Nebelhorn Trophy.

=== 2021–2022 season ===
After winning the Skating Club of Boston's Cranberry Cup event, Zhou was assigned as the American men's entry to the 2021 CS Nebelhorn Trophy to secure a third Olympic berth for the United States. Zhou placed first in both programs to win the event.

At his first Grand Prix assignment of the season, the 2021 Skate America, Zhou skated two clean programs, including landing five quads in his free skate, to win both segments of competition and take the gold medal overall in what was considered an upset victory over compatriot Nathan Chen, who finished third after numerous mistakes. Chen had been undefeated for over three years prior. Zhou said afterward that he "didn't really expect this result, but what I did expect of myself was to be as well-prepared and well-trained as I possibly could, and I think just focusing on that every single day at home led to making the seemingly impossible become possible." His second assignment, the 2021 NHK Trophy, was widely considered a contest between Zhou and Skate America silver medalist Shoma Uno due to Yuzuru Hanyu having had to withdraw from the event due to injury. Zhou placed narrowly second in the short program, 3.07 points behind Uno, but had a poor free skate, singling a planned quad Lutz to open, underrotating three other jumps, and receiving quarter calls on three others. He pronounced himself "very disappointed and made a lot of mistakes and wish I could have done better and capitalize on this opportunity. This is not representative of my training." Zhou's results qualified him to the Grand Prix Final, but it was subsequently canceled due to restrictions prompted by the Omicron variant.

Zhou placed second with a clean skate in the short program at the 2022 U.S. Championships. He struggled in the free skate, making several errors on quadruple jumps and falling on his triple Axel attempt, placing fourth in that segment and narrowly third overall, 0.38 points ahead of pewter medalist Jason Brown. Zhou said, "the simplest answer is that I was just so nervous that my body froze up on me. I'm really disappointed in myself" Despite this personal disappointment, he was named to his second American Olympic team.

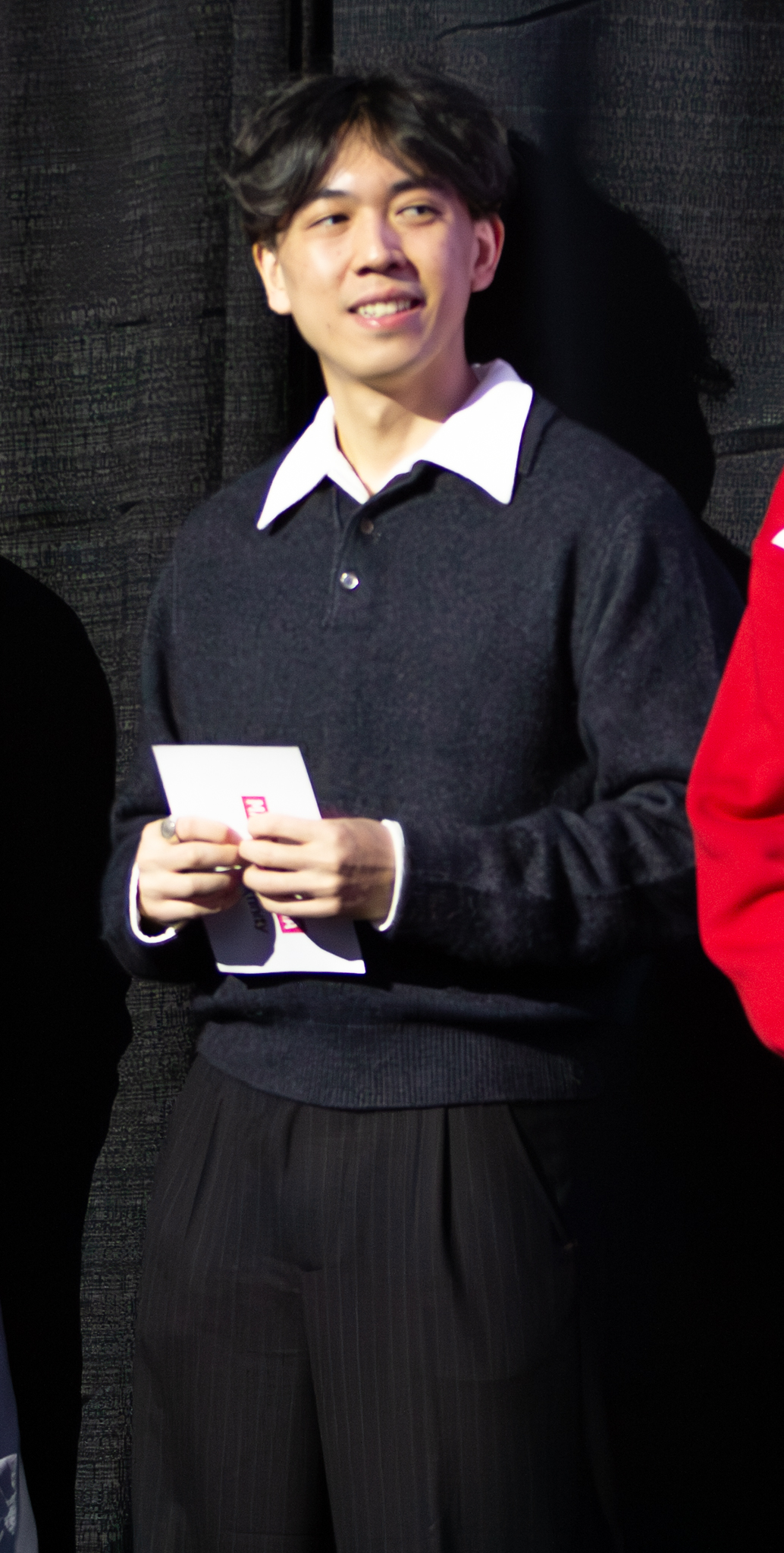
Zhou in attendance at the 2026 U.S. Championships

Beginning the 2022 Winter Olympics as the American entry in the men's free skate segment of the Olympic team event, Zhou popped a planned quadruple flip early in the program but rallied to complete three more quads and three Level 4 spins. With 171.44 points, Zhou ranked third in the segment and added eight team points en route to the gold medal finish for the Americans. Zhou received two positive tests for COVID-19 afterward and announced that he would have to withdraw from the men's event. Zhou called the turn of events "pretty unreal." Zhou was not allowed to participate in the closing ceremony despite testing negative for 14 straight days and having antibodies. Originally the U.S. team was awarded the silver medal, however following a positive doping test of Russia's gold medalist Kamila Valieva, the team members were not awarded their medals, pending an investigation. In January 2024, the Court of Arbitration for Sport disqualified her, and the gold medal was eventually awarded to the U.S. team.

Following a disappointing Olympics, Zhou concluded the season at the 2022 World Championships in Montpellier. Zhou placed sixth in the short program but rallied to place fourth in the free skate, securing third place overall in a chaotic event. He said afterward that he was "still very upset over the loss of that opportunity at the Olympics, but I'm very grateful that I still had the chance to compete here at Worlds. I did some great things out there, and there is a lot for me to learn and grow from."

Zhou indicated that he would focus "solely on academics" in the fall but did not rule out a comeback.

During the 2024 Paris Olympics, a medal ceremony was held for Zhou and his teammates from the 2022 Olympic Figure Skating Team Event, where they were awarded their Olympic gold medals.

== Programs ==
Season	Short program	Free skating	Exhibition
2021–2022	Vincent by Don McLean performed by Josh Groban choreo. by Lori Nichol	Crouching Tiger, Hidden Dragon by Tan Dun; Rising Sun by Kiyoshi Yoshida choreo. by Lori Nichol	Lonely by Illenium (feat. Chandler Leighton) choreo. by Vincent Zhou; Sign of the Times by Harry Styles
2020–2021	Vincent by Don McLean performed by Josh Groban choreo. by Lori Nichol	Algorithm by Muse choreo. by Misha Ge	Sign of the Times by Harry Styles
2019–2020	I Will Wait by Mumford & Sons choreo. by Shae-Lynn Bourne	Cloud Atlas by Reinhold Heil, Johnny Klimek, Tom Tykwer choreo. by Lori Nichol	Slow Dancing in the Dark by Joji
2018–2019	Exogenesis: Symphony Part 3 by Muse choreo. by Lori Nichol	Crouching Tiger, Hidden Dragon by Tan Dun; Rising Sun by Kiyoshi Yoshida choreo. by Jeffrey Buttle	Made in China by Higher Brothers, DJ Snake; Slow Dancing in the Dark by Joji choreo. by Joshua Farris; Take On Me by A-ha choreo. by Joshua Farris
2017–2018	Chasing Cars by Snow Patrol covered by Cinematic Pop choreo. by Jeffrey Buttle	Moulin Rouge!; Nature Boy by eden ahbez; Your Song (instrumental) by Elton John, Bernie Taupin performed by Craig Armstrong; Come What May by David Baerwald, Kevin Gilbert; choreo. by Jeffrey Buttle: Romeo + Juliet by Nellee Hooper, Craig Armstrong, Marius de Vries choreo. by Drew Meekins, Charlie White	Chasing Cars by Snow Patrol covered by Cinematic Pop choreo. by Jeffrey Buttle; Take On Me by A-ha choreo. by Joshua Farris; Sun (from Many Beautiful Things) by Sleeping at Last
2016–2017	Writing's on the Wall by Sam Smith; Spectre by Thomas Newman choreo. by Drew Meekins	Casablanca by L'Orchestra Cinematique; Melody Main Title - Casablanca by Royal Film Orchestra; Johnny Staccato by Elmer Bernstein choreo. by David Wilson	Sun (from Many Beautiful Things) by Sleeping at Last
2015–2016	Crystallize by Lindsey Stirling choreo. by Yuka Sato	The Godfather by Nino Rota choreo. by Justin Dillon	
2014–2015	Did not compete this season		
2013–2014	The Barber of Seville Overture by Gioachino Rossini	The Nutcracker by Pyotr Ilyich Tchaikovsky	
2012–2013	The Sorcerer's Apprentice by Trevor Rabin	Casablanca by L'Orchestra Cinematique; Melody Main Title - Casablanca by Royal Film Orchestra	Go the Distance
2011–2012	Nut Rocker by the Trans-Siberian Orchestra	Iron Monkey by James L. Venable; Rising Sun by Kiyoshi Yoshida	

== Competitive highlights ==
- GP – Event of the ISU Grand Prix Series
- JGP – Event of the ISU Junior Grand Prix Series
- CS – Event of the ISU Challenger Series
- WD – Withdrew from competition
- C – Event was cancelled
- Medals at team events are awarded for the team results only. Individual placements at team events are listed in parentheses.

Competition placements at senior level
Season	2015–16	2016–17	2017–18	2018–19	2019–20	2020–21	2021–22
Winter Olympics			6th				
Winter Olympics (Team event)							1st
World Championships			14th	3rd	C	25th	3rd
Four Continents Championships				3rd			
U.S. Championships	8th	2nd	3rd	2nd	4th	2nd	3rd
World Team Trophy				1st (2nd)			
GP Cup of China			4th				
GP France			9th				
GP NHK Trophy				4th			2nd
GP Skate America				5th		2nd	1st
CS Finlandia Trophy			2nd				
CS Golden Spin of Zagreb		WD					
CS Nebelhorn Trophy							1st
CS Tallinn Trophy				2nd			
CS U.S. Classic				4th	3rd		
Bavarian Open		1st					
Cranberry Cup							1st
Japan Open					3rd (3rd)		

Competition placements at junior level
Season	2012–13	2015–16	2016–17
World Junior Championships		5th	1st
Junior Grand Prix Final		4th	
U.S. Championships	1st		
JGP Austria		2nd	
JGP Estonia			3rd
JGP Japan			2nd
JGP Slovakia		2nd	

== Detailed results ==
ISU personal best scores in the +5/-5 GOE System
Segment	Type	Score	Event
Total	TSS	299.01	2019 World Team Trophy
Short program	TSS	100.51	2019 World Team Trophy
Short program	TES	57.93	2019 Four Continents Championships
Short program	PCS	44.17	2022 World Championships
Free skating	TSS	198.50	2019 World Team Trophy
Free skating	TES	110.19	2021 Skate America
Free skating	PCS	88.36	2019 World Team Trophy

ISU personal best scores in the +3/-3 GOE System
Segment	Type	Score	Event
Total	TSS	276.69	2018 Winter Olympics
Short program	TSS	96.78	2018 World Championships
Short program	TES	57.78	2018 World Championships
Short program	PCS	39.00	2018 World Championships
Free skating	TSS	192.16	2018 Winter Olympics
Free skating	TES	112.24	2018 Winter Olympics
Free skating	PCS	79.92	2018 Winter Olympics

- Small medals for the short program and free skating are only awarded at ISU Championships.
- At national events in the United States, pewter medals are awarded for fourth place.
- Medals at team events are awarded for the team results only. Individual placements at team events are listed in parentheses.

=== Senior level ===
Results in the 2015–16 season
Date	Event	SP		FS		Total	
Date	Event	P	Score	P	Score	P	Score
Jan 15–24, 2016	(United States) 2016 U.S. Championships	8	68.10	8	149.13	8	217.23

Results in the 2016–17 season
Date	Event	SP		FS		Total	
Date	Event	P	Score	P	Score	P	Score
Dec 7–10, 2016	(Croatia) 2016 CS Golden Spin of Zagreb	12	64.61	—N/a	—N/a	–	WD
Jan 14–22, 2017	(United States) 2017 U.S. Championships	3	87.85	2	175.18	2	263.03
Feb 14–19, 2017	(Germany) 2017 Bavarian Open	1	85.53	1	162.28	1	247.81

Results in the 2016–17 season
Date	Event	SP		FS		Total	
Date	Event	P	Score	P	Score	P	Score
Oct 6–8, 2017	(Finland) 2017 CS Finlandia Trophy	6	76.10	1	173.91	2	250.01
Nov 3–5, 2017	2017 Cup of China	8	80.23	2	176.43	4	256.66
Nov 17–19, 2017	2017 Internationaux de France	10	66.12	7	156.09	9	222.21
Dec 29, 2017 –Jan 8, 2018	(United States) 2018 U.S. Championships	5	89.02	3	184.81	3	273.83
Feb 16–17, 2018	(South Korea) 2018 Winter Olympics	12	84.53	6	192.16	6	276.69
Mar 19–25, 2018	(Italy) 2018 World Championships	3	96.78	19	138.46	14	235.24

Results in the 2018–19 season
Date	Event	SP		FS		Total	
Date	Event	P	Score	P	Score	P	Score
Sep 12–16, 2018	(United States) 2018 CS U.S. International Classic	6	61.72	1	142.90	4	204.62
Oct 19–21, 2018	(United States) 2018 Skate America	6	76.38	3	149.37	5	225.75
Nov 9–11, 2018	(Japan) 2018 NHK Trophy	5	75.90	4	147.52	4	223.42
Nov 26 – Dec 2, 2018	(Estonia) 2018 CS Tallinn Trophy	3	77.46	2	156.79	2	234.25
Jan 19–27, 2019	(United States) 2019 U.S. Championships	3	100.25	2	183.76	2	284.01
Feb 7–10, 2019	(United States) 2019 Four Continents Championships	1	100.18	5	172.04	3	272.22
Mar 18–24, 2019	(Japan) 2019 World Championships	4	94.17	3	186.99	3	281.16
Apr 11–14, 2019	(Japan) 2019 World Team Trophy	2	100.51	2	198.50	1 (2)	299.01

Results in the 2019–20 season
Date	Event	SP		FS		Total	
Date	Event	P	Score	P	Score	P	Score
Sep 17–22, 2019	(United States) 2019 CS U.S. International Classic	1	89.03	4	142.92	3	231.95
Oct 5, 2019	2019 Japan Open	—N/a	—N/a	3	167.64	3	—N/a
Jan 20–26, 2020	(United States) 2020 U.S. Championships	4	94.82	4	180.41	4	275.23

Results in the 2020–21 season
Date	Event	SP		FS		Total	
Date	Event	P	Score	P	Score	P	Score
Oct 23–24, 2020	(United States) 2020 Skate America	2	99.36	2	175.47	2	275.10
Jan 11–21, 2021	(United States) 2021 U.S. Championships	2	107.79	2	183.59	2	291.38
Mar 22–28, 2021	(Sweden) 2021 World Championships	25	70.51	—N/a	—N/a	25	70.51

Results in the 2021–22 season
Date	Event	SP		FS		Total	
Date	Event	P	Score	P	Score	P	Score
Aug 11–15, 2021	(United States) 2021 Cranberry Cup International	1	102.53	1	185.73	1	288.26
Sep 22–25, 2021	(Italy) 2021 CS Nebelhorn Trophy	1	97.35	1	186.88	1	284.23
Oct 22–24, 2021	(United States) 2021 Skate America	1	97.43	1	198.13	1	295.56
Nov 12–14, 2021	(Japan) 2021 NHK Trophy	2	99.51	6	161.18	2	260.69
Jan 3–9, 2022	(United States) 2022 U.S. Championships	2	112.78	4	177.38	3	290.16
Feb 4–7, 2022	(China) 2022 Winter Olympics (Team event)	—N/a	—N/a	3	171.44	1	—N/a
Mar 21–27, 2022	(France) 2022 World Championships	6	95.84	4	181.54	3	277.38

=== Junior level ===
Results in the 2012–13 season
Date	Event	SP		FS		Total	
Date	Event	P	Score	P	Score	P	Score
Jan 20–22, 2013	(United States) 2013 U.S. Championships	2	66.31	1	138.95	1	205.26

Results in the 2015–16 season
Date	Event	SP		FS		Total	
Date	Event	P	Score	P	Score	P	Score
Aug 19–23, 2015	2015 JGP Slovakia	2	68.07	2	132.78	2	200.85
Sep 9–13, 2015	2015 JGP Austria	3	66.59	2	145.37	2	211.96
Dec 10–13, 2015	(Spain) 2015–16 Junior Grand Prix Final	4	70.48	3	134.08	4	204.56
Mar 14–20, 2016	(Hungary) 2016 World Junior Championships	4	77.37	4	143.88	5	221.19

Results in the 2016–17 season
Date	Event	SP		FS		Total	
Date	Event	P	Score	P	Score	P	Score
Sep 8–11, 2016	2016 JGP Japan	1	80.53	2	145.86	2	226.39
Sep 28 – Oct 2, 2016	2016 JGP Estonia	1	78.10	3	135.82	3	213.92
Mar 15–19, 2017	(Taiwan) 2017 World Junior Championships	5	78.87	1	179.24	1	258.11
