= Lilias Trotter =

British missionary and artist (1853–1928)

I. Lilias Trotter
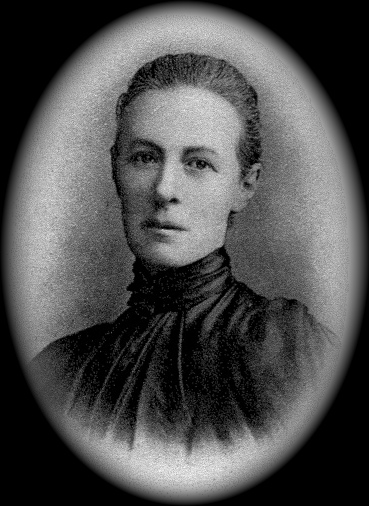
- Lilias Trotter, c. 1888
- Born: 14 July 1853; London, England
- Died: 27 August 1928 (aged 75); El Biar, Algiers, Algeria
- Notable work: Parables of the Cross (1890); Parables of the Christ-life (1899); Between the Desert and the Sea (1929); The Way Of The Sevenfold Secret (1933); The Master of the Impossible: sayings, for the most part in parable (1938)
- Parents: Alexander Trotter (1814–1866) (father); Isabella Strange (1816–1878) (mother)
- Relatives: The Revd Coutts Trotter (half-brother); Lt Col Sir Henry Trotter (half-brother); The Ven Canon Edward Trotter (half-brother); Alys Fane Trotter (sister-in-law); Hugh Egerton (brother-in-law); RAdm Henry Dundas Trotter (uncle); Col Alexander Strange (uncle); The Hon Thomas Lumisden Strange (uncle); The Rt Hon Sir Thomas Andrew Lumisden Strange (grandfather); The Rt Hon Sir William Burroughs, 1st Baronet (great-grandfather)

Isabella Lilias Trotter (14 July 1853 – 27 August 1928) was a British artist and a Protestant missionary to Algeria.

== Early life ==
Lilias Trotter was born in Marylebone, London, to Isabella and Alexander Trotter, a wealthy stockbroker for Coutts Bank. Both parents were well-read, intellectually curious, and inclined toward humanitarianism. Isabella Strange, a Low Church Anglican and the daughter of colonial administrator Thomas Andrew Lumisden Strange, married Alexander after the death of his first wife, who had borne him six children. Lilias was the first of three children born to this second marriage.

Although Lilias was devastated by the death of her father when she was twelve, the family's financial circumstances were only comparatively diminished by his loss. The next year, the family moved to 40 Montagu Square, where a next-door neighbor was writer Anthony Trollope.

== Career ==
In her early twenties, Trotter and her mother were greatly influenced by the Higher Life Movement, and Lilias joined the volunteer force that counseled inquirers during the London campaign meetings of American evangelist Dwight L. Moody.

Although Trotter was a nearly self-taught artist, her mother believed her talent exceptional, and in 1876, she sent some of Lilias' drawings to art critic and social philosopher John Ruskin while all three were staying in Venice—the latter while recovering from the early death of Rose La Touche, a young pupil to whom he had proposed marriage. Ruskin praised Trotter's artistic skill, and she became an informal student and a good friend despite the disparity in their ages. Ruskin told Trotter that if she would devote herself to her art "she would be the greatest living painter and do things that would be Immortal."

Although Trotter was drawn to the prospect of a life in art, in May 1879, she decided that she could not give herself "to painting and continue still to 'seek first the Kingdom of God and His Righteousness.'" She and Ruskin remained friends, and he never entirely relinquished the hope that she might return to art. Trotter became active in the Welbeck Street YWCA and served as secretary, "a voluntary position usually filled by women like herself from wealthy families." She did a considerable amount of teaching and (unusually for respectable young women of the period) fearlessly canvassed the streets alone at night near Victoria Station for prostitutes who might be persuaded to train for an employable skill or to simply spend a night in a hostel. In 1884, suffering from physical and emotional exhaustion, she underwent surgery which, though "slight in nature … left her very ill." Apparently her heart was permanently damaged in the process.

=== Algeria ===
During the next few years, Trotter felt an impulse toward missionary work in non-Christian lands, even telling one of her friends that "whenever she prayed, the words 'North Africa' sounded in her soul as though a voice were calling her." In May 1887, when a missionary to North Africa asked at a religious meeting if God was calling anyone to North Africa, Trotter rose and said, "He is calling me." On 14 July, her thirty-fourth birthday, she applied as a candidate to the North African Mission—which then rejected her because she was unable to pass its health examination. However, because she had the resources to be self-supporting, the Mission decided that she might "work in harmony" with the society without being an official member.

Nine months later, in March 1888, Trotter and two other financially independent women—including Blanche Haworth, who for more than thirty years played "Martha" to Trotter's "Mary"— arrived in Algiers. Trotter recalled, "Three of us stood there, looking at our battle-field, none of us fit to pass a doctor for any society, not knowing a soul in the place, or a sentence of Arabic or a clue for beginning work on untouched ground; we only knew we had to come. Truly if God needed weakness, He had it!"

The women moved into the French quarter and diligently studied Arabic through French study materials and eventually through a professional tutor. They also learned how to do domestic work, all of them previously having had their needs met by servants.

Later Trotter said that the early years were like "knocking our heads against stone walls," but the women were indefatigable, trying one technique after another in an attempt to make inroads into the Algerian culture and all the while improving their Arabic. Eventually Trotter was able to gain access to the heavily secluded women by first befriending their children. The outreach to women, she believed, was a "great line of cleavage in the rock face of Islam."

Converts were banished, beaten, even (Trotter believed) poisoned with "mind drugs" that were to be administered in food or drink and would produce "a paralysis of mind and will." Many converts died, and Trotter "came to rejoice in their loss. 'We were glad to let them go … One draws a breath of relief when they get safe home [to heaven].'"

Trotter's health was so seriously impaired that she regularly spent extended periods of convalescence in Great Britain or on the continent. Adding to the difficulties of the English missionaries was French colonial suspicion of their activities. The local government bought a house across the street and for three years lured potential converts away with competing classes. Spies and gendarmes even followed the women into the southern desert and threatened fines and imprisonment for any who went near them or accepted their literature.

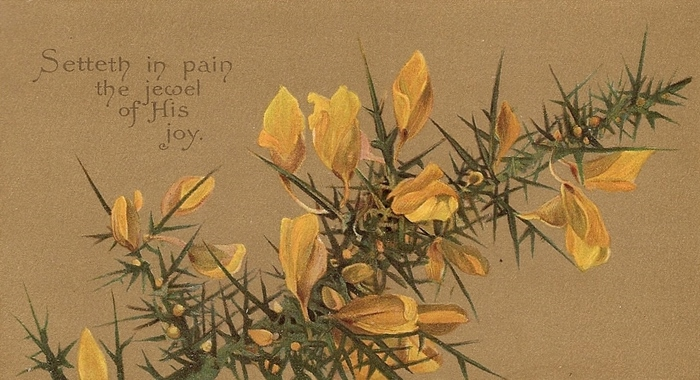
An illustration from Trotter's Parables of the Cross.

Nevertheless, by 1906, with warming relations between England and France, Trotter experienced less governmental antagonism and more freedom for her missionary work. In 1907 five new workers joined the "Algiers Mission Band." By 1920, there were thirty full-time workers and fifteen preaching stations. Trotter became the reluctant, but unchallenged, leader of the group, which in 1907 was named the Algiers Mission Band. Trotter was sensitive to the contemporary difficulty of a woman exerting authority over a man, but as the staff included more men, she shrewdly refined "the organizational system to capitalize on their leadership." Trotter never solicited funds because she said God's wealth was boundless.

Trotter was also a pioneer in attempting to adapt Christian missionary endeavor to the Algerian culture. Referring to evangelistic meetings as a "European idea," she proposed evangelizing with "a native cafe on a Christian footing," readings of the Bible in a "rhythmical recitative" accompanied by a drum, a craft house that would teach little girls embroidery, and a Christian retreat for women to "take the place of the outings to shrines which are their only chance of fresh air." Trotter designed cards that had biblical passages drawn by an Arab scribe because "no one but a native can give the subtle lines & curves of the writing as they should be." The mission society even published a series of cards with a sentence from the Koran followed by verses from the Old Testament.

Trotter was a "prodigious writer," filling a journal page nearly every day for forty years and illustrating the world around her with sketches and watercolors. From these efforts came several books of somewhat flowery and mystical prose, including Parables of the Cross and Parables of the Christ-life. Though she considered orthodox Islam "dry as the dune, hard as the gravel," she responded to the "sincere hunger for things of the spirit" in the Sufi mystics and wrote for them The Way of the Sevenfold Secret as a devotional guide based on the seven "I am" statements found in the Gospel of John.

== Later years and legacy ==
Confined to bed during her last years, Trotter devoted herself to prayer, writing, and sketching while continuing to manage the affairs of the Algiers Mission Band as best she could. She had taken on Belle Patrick as her secretary in 1924. Following qualifying as one of the first three women lawyers in Scotland, Patrick booked her passage to Algiers the very next day. As her body failed, her mind remained clear, even at the end asking prayer for the strength to dictate a letter to Amy Carmichael of India, with whom she had regular correspondence. While attendants sang a hymn, she exclaimed, "A chariot and six horses." "You are seeing beautiful things," someone asked. "Yes," she said, "many, many beautiful things."

In 2015, Oxvision Films released a feature-length documentary, Many Beautiful Things: The Life and Vision of Lilias Trotter. Starring Michelle Dockery as the voice of Lilias Trotter and John Rhys-Davies as the voice of her mentor John Ruskin, Many Beautiful Things premiered in the UK on 11 July 2015 at the Manchester International Festival, and in the United States on 17 October at the Heartland Film Festival. The film was directed by Laura Waters Hinson, and its musical score was written by Sleeping at Last.

== Selected works ==
- Parables of the Cross (London: Marshall Brothers, 1890)
- Parables of the Christ-life (London: Marshall Brothers, 1899)
- Between the Desert and the Sea (London: Marshall, Morgan and Scott, 1929)
- The Way Of The Sevenfold Secret (Turnbridge Wells, England: Nile Mission Press, 1933) Arabic E-text, English E-text
- The Master of the Impossible: sayings, for the most part in parable (ed. Constance Padwick) (London: SPCK, 1938)
- Cherry Blossom.
- Sand Lilies.
- Focussed: A Story and A Song
- Vibrations (E-text)
- Trained to Rule
- A Thirsty Land and God's Channels
- A South Land
- Smouldering
- A Ripened Life
- A Life On Fire
- Heavenly Light on the Daily Path
- A Challenge To Faith
- Back-ground and Fore-Ground
- Winter Buds
