= William Gerard, 2nd Baron Gerard =

British Army officer and nobleman

Colonel William Cansfield Gerard, 2nd Baron Gerard DSO (1 June 1851 – 30 July 1902) was a British Army officer and nobleman.

== Biography ==
Gerard was born in 1851, the elder son of Robert Gerard, 1st Baron Gerard, by his wife Harriet Clifton. His father succeeded an elder brother as Baronet in 1854, and in 1876 was raised to the peerage as Baron Gerard. William was educated at Oscott College, and succeeded his father as baron in 1887.

He was commissioned a lieutenant in the 2nd Life Guards, and after resignation from the army was an officer in the Lancashire Hussars, a Yeomanry regiment, where he was from 25 February 1893 lieutenant colonel in command, with the honorary rank of colonel.

After the outbreak of the Second Boer War in October 1899, he volunteerd for active service in South Africa, where he was from 31 October 1899 an extra Aide-de-camp to General Sir Redvers Buller, Commanding the troops in Natal. For his service he was mentioned in despatches, received the Queen's South Africa Medal with six clasps, and was appointed a Companion of the Distinguished Service Order (DSO).

== Family ==
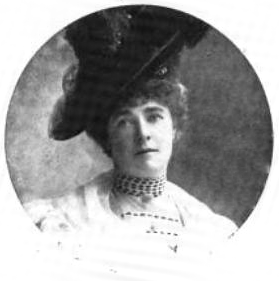
Lady Mary Gerard, 1901 photograph

Gerard married, in 1877, Mary Milner, daughter of Henry Beilby Milner, of West Retford, a descendant of the Milner baronets. Their son Frederic John Gerard succeeded as Baron Gerard.

Peerage of the United Kingdom
Preceded by Robert Gerard	Baron Gerard; 1887–1902	Succeeded by Frederic John Gerard
