= Robert Gerard, 1st Baron Gerard =

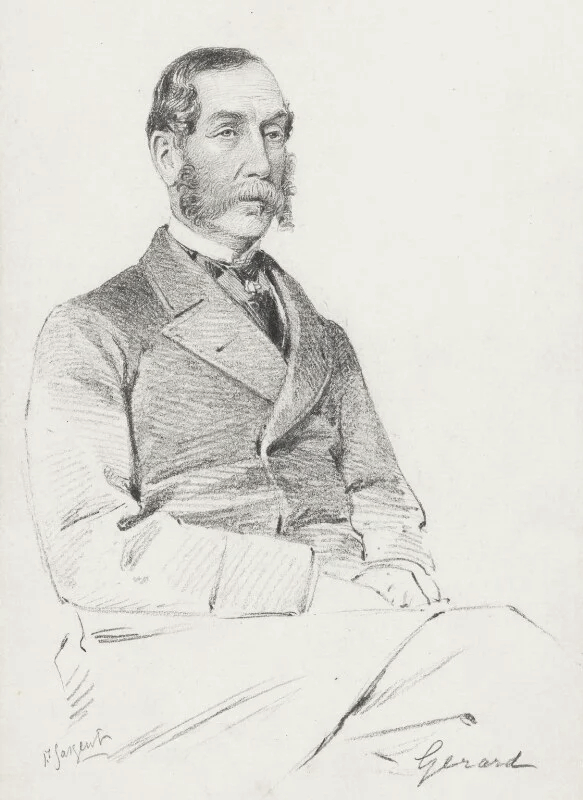
Sir Robert Tolver Gerard, 13th Baronet

Robert Tolver Gerard, 1st Baron Gerard (1808–1887) was a British Army officer, landowner and coalowner, and courtier.

== Early life and background ==
He was the third son, in a family of six sons and two daughters, of John Gerard of Windle Hall, son of Sir Robert Gerard, 9th Baronet of Bryn, and his wife Elizabeth Ferrers of Baddesley Clinton. He was educated at Oscott College.

The Gerards were a recusant family, who used the Sankey Canal to extract coal from their estate on the Lancashire Coalfield from the middle of the 18th century. The 10th and the 11th Baronets, of the Gerard baronets of Bryn (1611), were his uncles.

Collieries based around Ashton-in-Makerfield became very active by the middle of the 19th century. At this period they operated on Gerard family leases.

== Military career ==
Gerard entered in 1828 the Carabiniers (6th Dragoon Guards) as a cornet, becoming lieutenant in 1836, captain in 1837, and retiring on half pay in 1839. All these ranks were held by purchase. From 1867 he held the post of Yeomanry ADC in the Royal Household, with honorary rank of colonel.

When the Lancashire Hussars was reformed in 1848 as a militia cavalry unit, Gerald's brother the 12th Baronet became its commanding officer. Robert Gerard himself took on that role, as Major-Commandant, at the end of 1854. His theoretical retirement from the Army some years earlier had been as a major in the 68th Foot. He had also been a half-pay major of the Duke of Lancaster's Own Yeomanry.

== Baronet ==
Robert Gerard became the 13th Baronet, of Bryn, in 1854 on the death of his elder brother John, the 12th Baronet. A chancery case Walmesley v Gerard was subsequently brought, in which Sir Robert was the defendant, on the interpretation of a "shifting clause" in the will of the 11th Baronet. In 1859 Gerard was High Sheriff of Lancashire.

The House of Lords committee report of 1862 on "Injury from Noxious Vapours", proposed by the Earl of Derby, was prompted in part by Gerard's claims of damage to land values by alkali works in the St Helens area. In 1875 a parliamentary committee looked into the water supply for the town of Ashton-in-Makerfield, stated to be five-sixths owned by Sir Robert Gerard.

== Baron ==
Benjamin Disraeli once said to Gerard "Catholics and Tories are natural allies." In fact in 1871 Gerard had a clear preference for the 15th Earl of Derby, son of the late Prime Minister. A significant landowner, he was made a Baron in 1876 from a list of Disraeli's, in a trio of men with annual income in the range £45,000 to £60,000.

== Family ==
Gerard married in 1849 Harriet Clifton, daughter of Edward Clifton of Lytham Hall and his wife Elizabeth Scarisbrick-Eccleston, sister of Charles Scarisbrick. The couple had two sons and two daughters. Of the daughters:

- Mary Monica married in 1878 Laurence Oliphant.
- Katharine Frances (died 1924) married in 1880 Martin Gosselin.

The sons were:

- William Cansfield Gerard (1851–1902) who married in 1877 Mary Emmeline Laura Milner, granddaughter of Marcus Beresford, and succeeded as the 2nd Baron.
- Robert Joseph Gerard-Dicconson (1857–1918), who added the surname Dicconson in 1896, married in 1888 Eleanor Sarah Bankes.

Isabel Burton was the Baron's niece, daughter of his sister Eliza, who married in 1830 Henry Raymond Arundell.

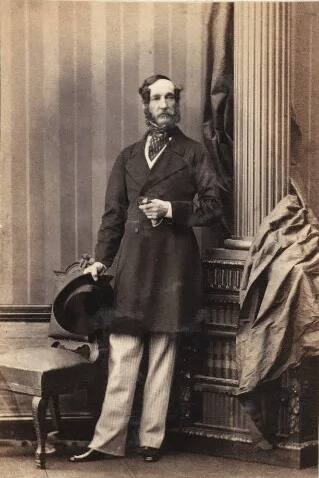
Sir Robert Gerard, 1861 studio portrait photograph by Camille Silvy

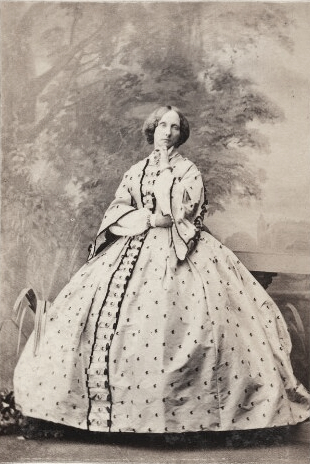
Harriet, Lady Gerard, 1861 studio portrait photograph by Camille Silvy

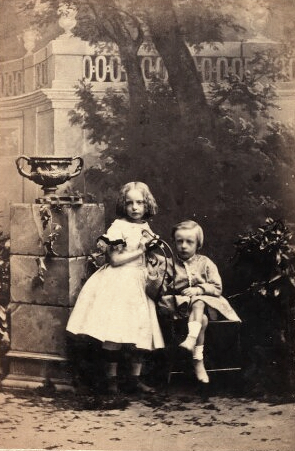
Katherine Frances Gerard and Robert Joseph Gerard, 1862 studio portrait photograph by Camille Silvy

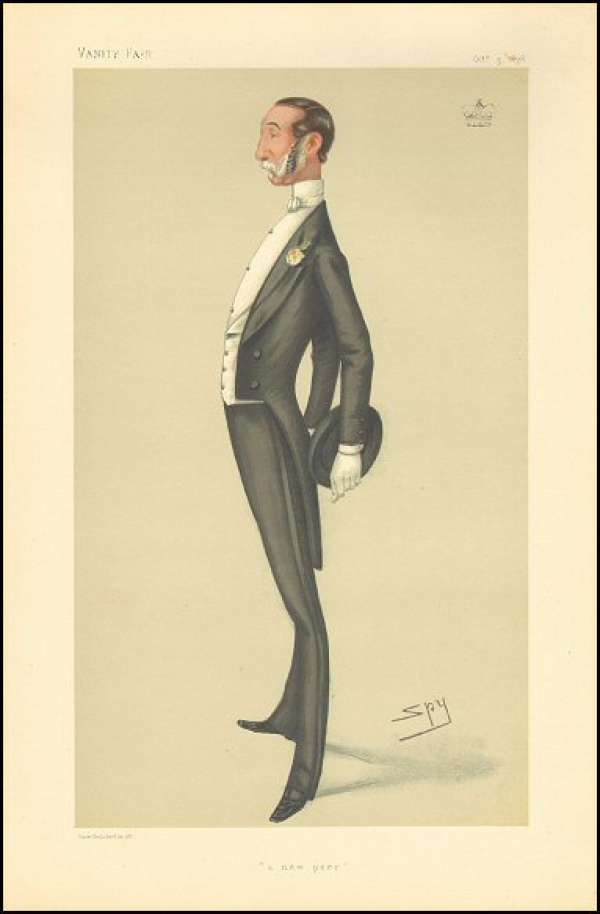
"a new peer", caricature by Spy in Vanity Fair, 1878

== Notes ==
Peerage of the United Kingdom
| Preceded by New Creation | Baron Gerard; 1876–1887 | Succeeded by William Cansfield Gerard |
Baronetage of England
| Preceded by Sir John Gerard | Baronet (of Bryn); 1854–1887 | Succeeded by William Cansfield Gerard |
