= Henry Trotter =

Henry Trotter is the name of:

- Henry Trotter (British Army officer) (1844–1905), major general
- Henry Trotter (Indian Army officer) (1841–1919), officer in the Royal Bengal Engineers and central Asian explorer
- Henry Dundas Trotter (1802–1859), Scottish Royal Navy rear-admiral
- Henry John Trotter (1835–1888), English barrister, railway director and Conservative politician

== See also ==
- Edward Henry Trotter (1872–1916), First World War British Army lieutenant-colonel; son of the major general
