= Tom Zakrajsek =

American figure skater & coach (born 1963)

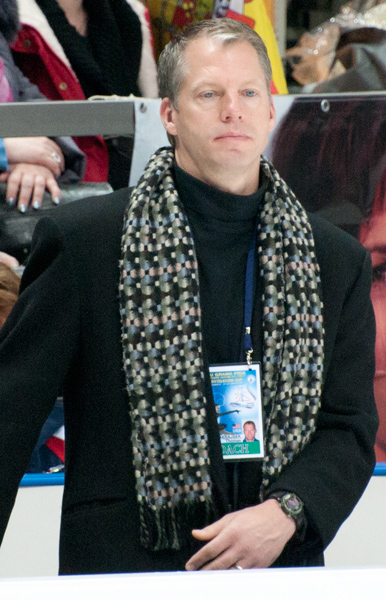
- Zakrajsek at the 2011 Rostelecom Cup.

Personal information
- Born: December 10, 1963 (age 62) Garfield Heights, Ohio

Figure skating career
- Country: United States

Tom Zakrajsek (pronounced Za-cry-sheck; born December 10, 1963) is an American figure skating coach and former competitive skater. As a skater, he competed as a senior on the national level. He coaches at the Broadmoor Skating Club in Colorado Springs, Colorado.

== Skating career ==
Zakrajsek first went skating at age 7 but did poorly. He came back to the sport three years later and started training. His training locations included Cleveland, Detroit, Cincinnati, and Denver. He was coached by Norma Sahlin for seven years. He competed in men's singles, including winning the junior title at the 1979 Eastern Great Lakes Regional Championship and the senior title at the 1986 Southwestern Regional Championship. He competed in men's singles at the U.S. Nationals five times, once as a junior (1983) and four times as a senior (1985-1988). He also competed in pair skating with Sheila Nobles at 1985 Nationals, finishing 12th. After retiring from competition, he toured with Disney on Ice.

== Coaching career ==
Zakrajsek began coaching in 1991 in Saint Joseph, Missouri, and later moved to the Broadmoor Skating Club in Colorado Springs, Colorado.

His current and former students include:

- Max Aaron, 2013 U.S. national champion
- Jeremy Abbott, 2009 and 2010 U.S. national champion
- Ryan Bradley, 2011 U.S. national champion, coached Bradley for 22 years
- Joshua Farris
- Rachael Flatt, 2010 Olympian, 2010 U.S. national champion and 2008 World Junior champion
- Alexe Gilles, 2008 U.S. national junior champion
- Kaja Hanevold
- Alexandra Kamieniecki
- Austin Kanallakan, 2007 U.S. national junior bronze medalist
- Ann Patrice McDonough, 2002 World Junior champion
- Keauna McLaughlin / Rockne Brubaker
- Brandon Mroz, 2009 U.S. national silver medalist
- Mirai Nagasu, 2018 Olympian, 2018 U.S. national silver medalist
- Paul Bonifacio Parkinson
- Andrei Rogozine
- Bradie Tennell, coached from 2020.
- Agnes Zawadzki, 2010 World Junior silver medalist, coached her 2008–2011 and from October 2013
- Vincent Zhou, 2018 Olympian, 2018 U.S. national bronze medalist

Zakrajsek was named the 2009 PSA Coach of the Year. He was nominated for the award in 2011.

== Personal life ==
Zakrajsek was born on December 10, 1963. He has Polish and Slovenian ancestry. He studied at Missouri Western State College. He has a master's degree in science. He has two sisters and a brother. His siblings and parents all skated recreationally. His wife, Susan, is a teacher; they have a daughter, Madison, and a son, Dylan, who is two years younger.
