= Trotter =

Trotter or Trotters may refer to:

== Places ==
- Trotters, North Dakota, an unincorporated community in Golden Valley County, United States
- Trotters Gorge, New Zealand

== People ==
- Trotter (surname), list of people with the name
- Clan Trotter, a Lowland Scottish clan

== Sports ==
- Trotter (horse), a horse trained for harness racing
- Harlem Globetrotters, an American exhibition basketball team
- St. Louis Trotters, an American team in the Independent Basketball Association
- The Trotters, the nickname of English football team Bolton Wanderers F.C.

== Other uses ==
- Trotters, the feet of an ungulate, especially in a culinary context.
  - Cow's trotters, the feet of cattle
  - Pig's trotters, the feet of pigs
  - Sheep's trotters, the feet of sheep or lambs
- Trotter (locomotive), an 1834 steam locomotive of the Dundee and Newtyle Railway

== See also ==
- Trotta (disambiguation)
- Trotter Prize (disambiguation)
