= Many Beautiful Things =

- Written by: Laura Waters Hinson
- Produced by: Laura Waters Hinson
- Starring: Michelle Dockery; John Rhys-Davies
- Cinematography: Kasey Kirby; Patrick Meade Jones
- Edited by: Barbara Ballow; Laura Waters Hinson
- Music by: Sleeping at Last
- Release date: 17 October 2015 (Heartland Film Festival)
- Running time: 70 minutes

Many Beautiful Things is a 2015 documentary film written and directed by Laura Waters Hinson. It follows the story of 19th century female artist, Lilias Trotter, and her decision to leave her life in England for a life of missionary work in French Algeria. This film features Michelle Dockery and John Rhys-Davies with the original film score written and performed by Sleeping at Last.

The film was produced by Oxvision Films and Image Bearer Pictures. It premiered at the Heartland Film Festival in Indianapolis, Indiana on 17 October 2015. It showed at the National Gallery of Art in Washington, D.C., on 6 February 2016 as a part of its nationwide release tour.

== Synopsis ==
The film tells the story of Lilias Trotter, a young artist from the British Victorian era who left her promising art career for a life of missionary work in the North African country of Algeria. By following what she believes to be her vocation, she sacrifices the opportunity of being the apprentice of one of the most influential art critics of the Victorian Era, John Ruskin. The film chronicles the relationship and written correspondence between Lilias Trotter (voice of Michelle Dockery) and John Ruskin (voice of John Rhys-Davies), who spends much of his life trying to convince Lilias to come back to her home in England and continue her career in art.

The film explores the psychological complexities of this decision for Lilias, who struggles to find a way for her artistic talent to coincide with her missionary vocation. Because the time of Lilias' decision to move to Africa overlaps with the beginning of the Suffragette Movement in England, an underlying theme of female independence and empowerment is present throughout the film.

== Filming Locations ==
- Georgetown, Washington, D.C.
- Salton Sea, California
- Oxford, England
- Lake District, England
- Brantwood, England (Home of John Ruskin)

== Awards and nominations ==
- Best Visual Effects – Kansas Film Festival
- Official Selection – Heartland Film Festival
- Official Selection – Manchester Film Festival
- Official Selection – Kansas Film Festival
- Official Selection – Attic Film Festival
- Official Selection – Park City Film Festival

== Production ==
This executive producers of Many Beautiful things are Hisao Kurosawa (son of Akira Kurosawa), Brian Oxley, and Sally Oxley. The film was produced in Image Bearer Pictures studio in partnership with Oxvision.

== Cast ==
- John Rhys-Davies as The Voice of John Ruskin
- Jerry Eisley as John Ruskin
- Michelle Dockery as The Voice of Lilias Trotter
- Ashley Adams Beach as Lilias Trotter
