= Norma Sahlin =

American figure skater coach (1927–2005)

- Sahlin in the 1950s

Personal information
- Born: Norma Lee Caine; September 9, 1927 Ionia, Michigan
- Died: June 22, 2005 (aged 78)

Figure skating career
- Country: United States
- Partner: Wally Sahlin
- Coach: Bill Swallender
- Skating club: Ice Follies

Norma Lee Sahlin (September 9, 1927 – June 22, 2005) was a figure skating coach and a national level competitor.

== Personal life ==
Sahlin was born in Ionia, Michigan. She started skating in Sault Ste. Marie, Michigan under coach Pierre Brunet. She later moved to Chicago to train under Bill Swallender. She competed in pairs with her husband, Wally Sahlin. They won the junior title at the 1947 Midwestern Sectional Championships. The pair skated with the Ice Follies for three seasons, before they decided to live in Littleton, Colorado where she coached at South Suburban Ice Arena. They also have a son, Michael, who with his partner won the junior pairs title at the 1972 Midwestern Sectional Championships, 25 years after his parents.

== Skating career ==
Sahlin coached Charles Tickner to win the 1978 World Figure Skating Championships, bronze at the 1980 World Figure Skating Championships, and bronze at the 1980 Winter Olympics. She also coached Barbara Brown and Doug Berndt at the 1972 Winter Olympics. Other students included Tom Zakrajsek for seven years and Jill Trenary for eighteen months. In total she coached students at seven World Championships.

== Awards ==
She and her husband, Wally Sahlin, were inducted into the United States Figure Skating Hall of Fame in 2004. Other awards include:

- Honorary Member of the Professional Skaters Association (PSA)
- inducted to PSA Coaches Hall of Fame in January 2005
- Betty Berens Award in 2003
- Sportswoman of Colorado Superior Achievement in 1978
