= Baron Gerard =

Extinct barony in the Peerage of England

Barony Gerard
- Argent, a saltire gules
- Creation date: 18 January 1876
- Creation: Third
- Created by: Queen Victoria
- Peerage: Peerage of the United Kingdom
- First holder: Robert Tolver Gerard, 1st Baron Gerard
- Present holder: Anthony Gerard, 5th Baron Gerard
- Heir apparent: Hon. Rupert Gerard
- Remainder to: Heirs male of the first baron's body lawfully begotten
- Former seats: Bryn Hall; Garswood Hall; New Hall
- Motto: En Dieu est mom esperance ("In God is my hope")

There have been three baronies created for the Gerard family who lived historically at Bryn, Ashton-in-Makerfield, Lancashire and Kingsley, Cheshire, in the 13th century. The third and current barony was created in 1876.

== History ==
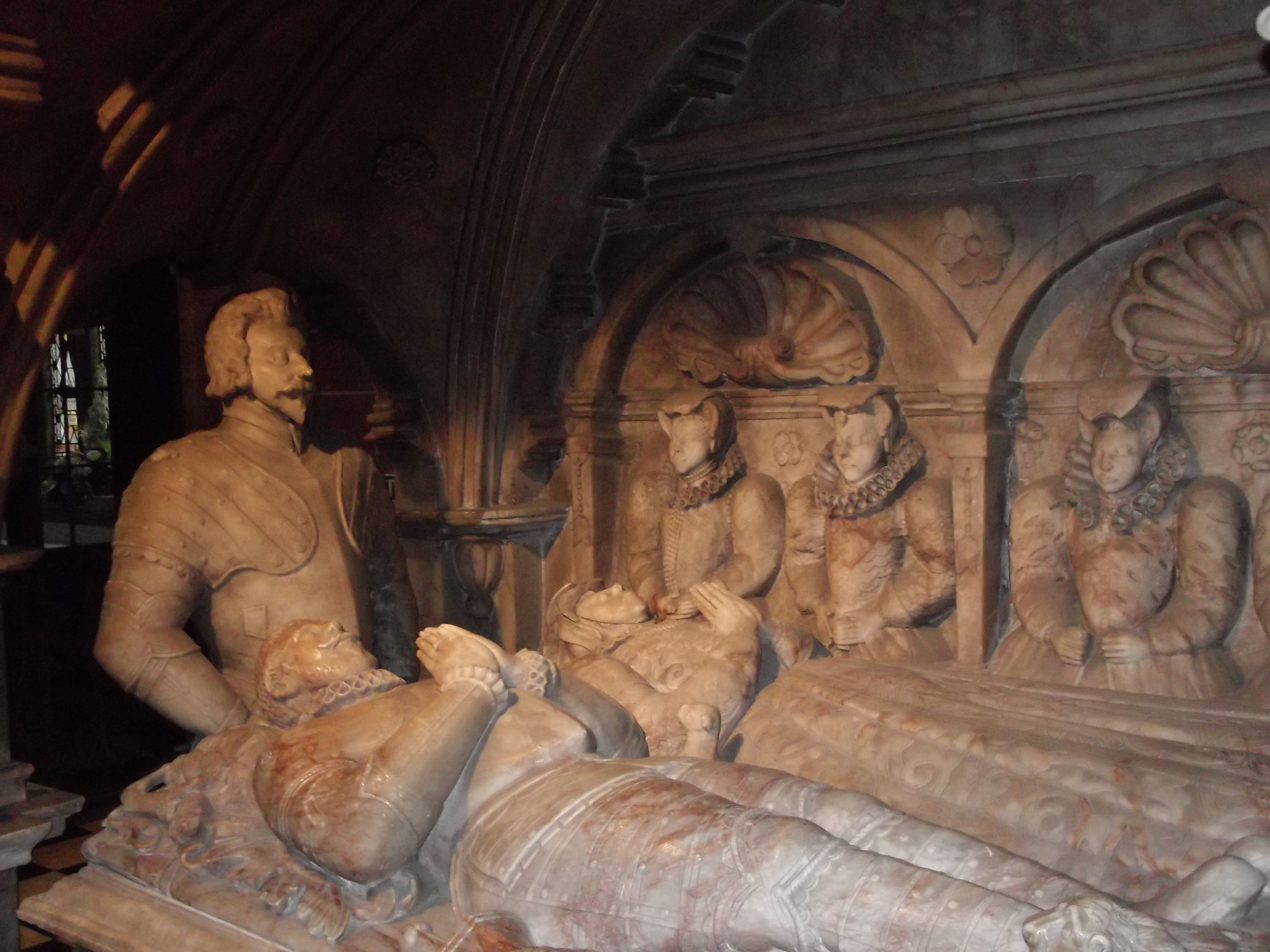
The Gerard Family: Thomas, 1st Baron Gerard (kneeling); Gilbert Gerard, 2nd Baron Gerard; Anne Radcliffe. Gerard Memorial, Ashley.

The earliest traceable member of the family that gave rise to the Barons Gerard was a William Fitz Gerard, who lived during the reign of Henry III of England and obtained his lands in Kingsley, Cheshire, by marriage Emma, daughter of Richard de Kingsley. Traditional genealogical sources have shifted this man back in time and given the family a shared origin with the Hiberno-Norman FitzGeralds, Dukes of Leinster in the Peerage of Ireland, and they adopted the same arms as that famous family, argent, a saltire gules, before the 17th century in place of an earlier coat bearing a lion. They were noted as having exasperated heralds by long ignoring their entreaties to be allowed to record the family's pedigree, arms, and early land documents.

== First creation (1603–1733) ==
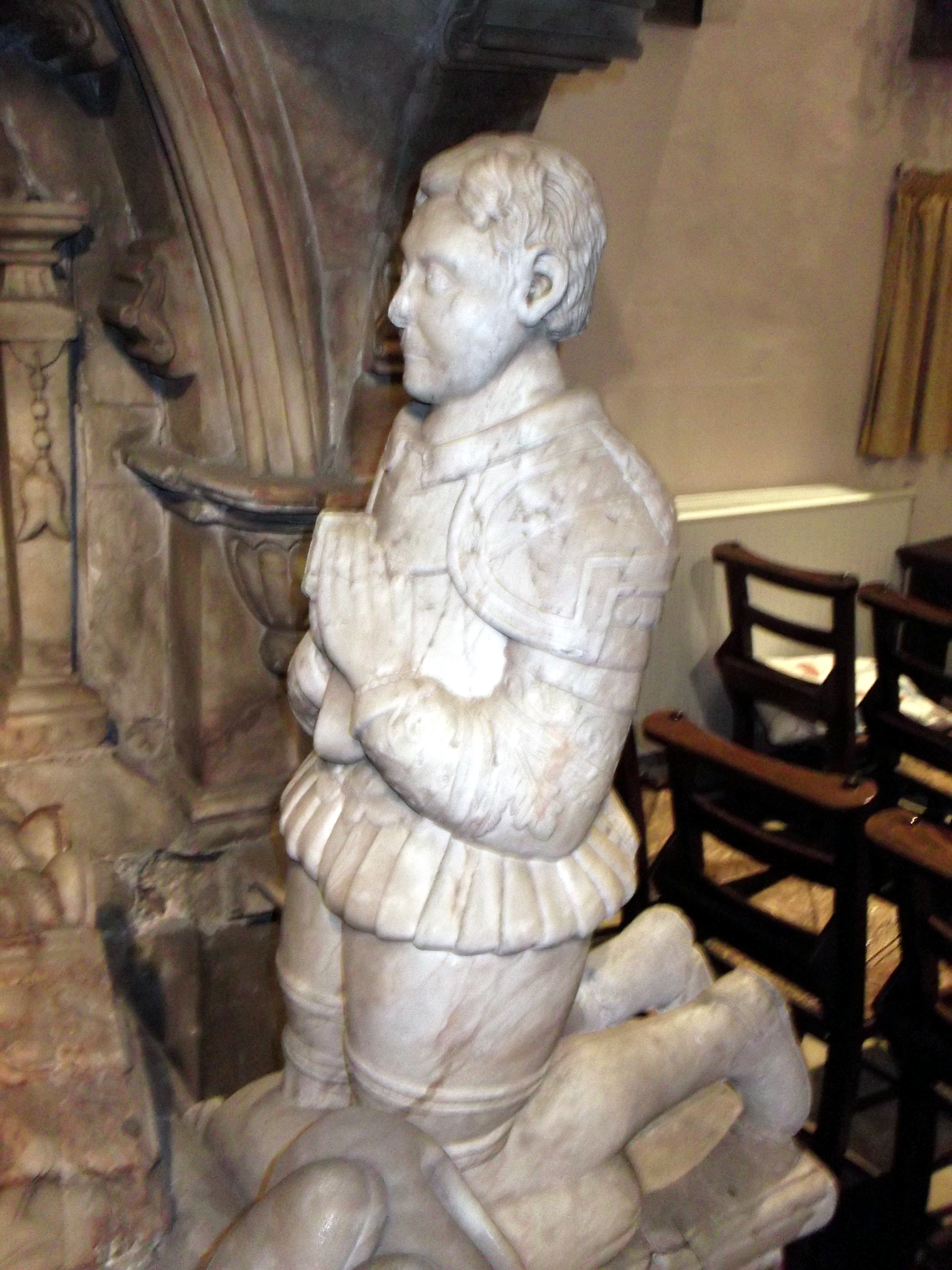
Gilbert, 2nd Baron Gerard; Gerard Chapel, Church of St John the Baptist, Ashley

The title Baron Gerard, of Gerard's Bromley, was created in the Peerage of England on 21 July 1603 for Sir Thomas Gerard (d. 1617), son of Sir Gilbert Gerard (d. 1593) Attorney General between 1559 and 1581 and Master of the Rolls in 1581, who acquired estates at Gerards Bromley and Hilderstone, Staffordshire. The first Baron was Lord President of Wales between 1616 and 1617. The barony passed in direct line of succession until the death of the fifth Baron in 1684 when it passed to his second cousin Charles, a great-grandson of the 1st Baron Gerard, and upon his death without a male heir, to his brother Philip Gerard, a Jesuit priest who died childless in 1733 when the barony became extinct.

== Second creation (1645–1702) ==
A second peerage was awarded the family in 1645, when Charles Gerard, whose grandfather was the brother of the 1st Baron Gerard of Gerard's Bromley, was summoned to Parliament as Baron Gerard, of Brandon, Suffolk. The 1st Baron was subsequently made Earl of Macclesfield in 1679, and the two titles passed together to his son and grandson, Fitton Gerard, 3rd Earl of Macclesfield and 3rd Baron Gerard, on whose death in 1702 the 1645 Gerard barony became extinct.

== Third creation (1876–present) ==
The title of Baron Gerard of Bryn in the County Palatine of Lancaster, was created in the Peerage of the United Kingdom in 1876 for Sir Robert Gerard, 13th Baronet Gerard of Bryn.

The title followed the line of the first Baron's eldest son until the death of the latter's grandson, the fourth Baron, in 1992. He was succeeded by his second cousin once removed, the fifth and present holder of the barony. He is the great-grandson of Captain the Hon. Robert Joseph Gerard-Dicconson, second son of the 1st Baron. The family seat was originally Bryn Hall, Ashton-in-Makerfield, but later Garswood Hall, followed by New Hall, a majestic, modernist, building of considerable size.

The current baron, Anthony Gerard, 5th Baron Gerard, was educated at Harvard University and lives in New York.

== Barons Gerard, of Gerards Bromley, first creation (1603) ==
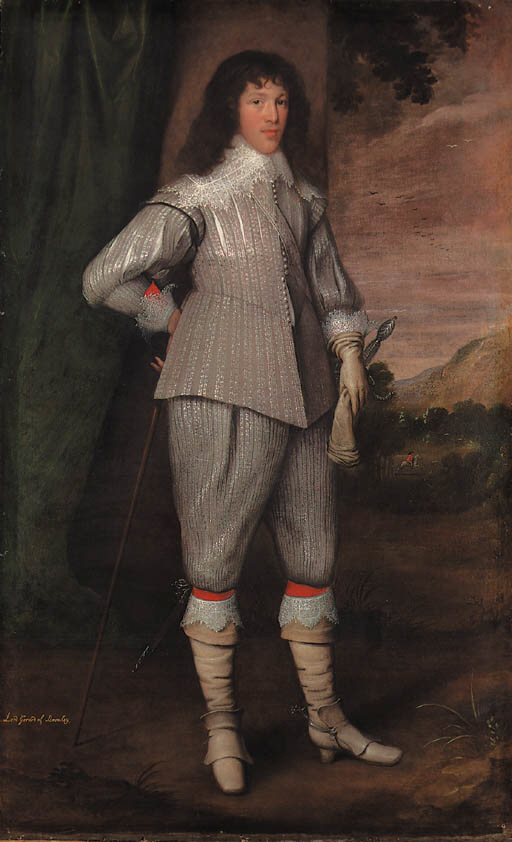
Portrait of Dutton, 3rd Baron Gerard by George Geldorp

- Thomas Gerard, 1st Baron Gerard (d. 1617)
- Gilbert Gerard, 2nd Baron Gerard (d. 1622)
- Dutton Gerard, 3rd Baron Gerard (1613–1640)
- Charles Gerard, 4th Baron Gerard (1634–1667)
- Digby Gerard, 5th Baron Gerard (1662–1684)
- Charles Gerard, 6th Baron Gerard (1659–1707)
- Philip Gerard, 7th Baron Gerard (1665–1733) (extinct)

== Barons Gerard, of Brandon, second creation (1645) ==
- Charles Gerard, 1st Earl of Macclesfield, 1st Baron Gerard, (1618–1694)
- Charles Gerard, 2nd Earl of Macclesfield, 2nd Baron Gerard, (1659–1701)
- Fitton Gerard, 3rd Earl of Macclesfield, 2nd Baron Gerard, (1665–1702) (extinct)

== Barons Gerard, of Bryn, third creation (1876) ==
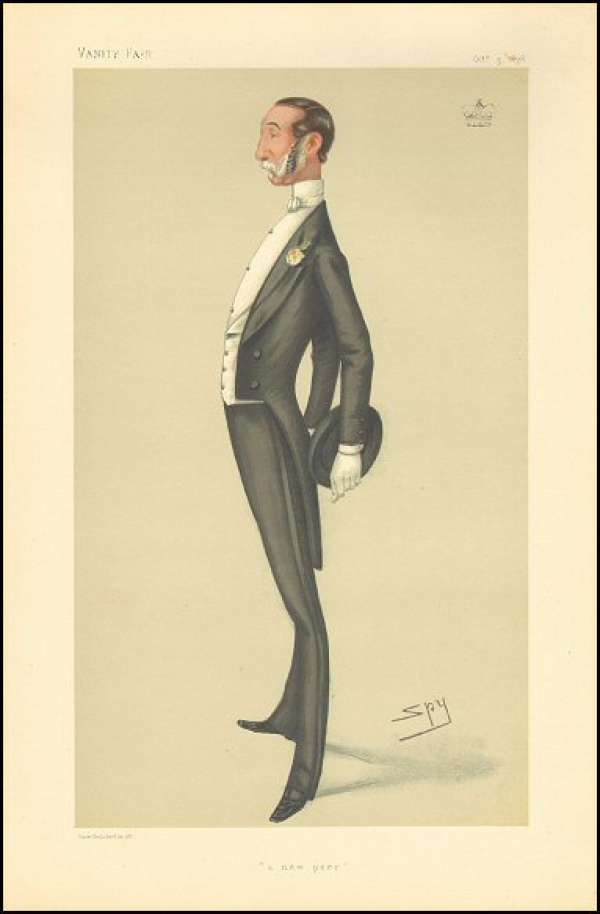
"A new peer" – caricature of Robert Tolver Gerard by Spy published in Vanity Fair in 1878.

- Robert Tolver Gerard, 1st Baron Gerard (12 May 1808 – 15 March 1887)
- William Cansfield Gerard, 2nd Baron Gerard (1851–1902)
- Frederic John Gerard, 3rd Baron Gerard (1883–1953)
- Robert William Frederick Alwyn Gerard, 4th Baron Gerard (1918–1992)
- Anthony Robert Hugo Gerard, 5th Baron Gerard (b. 1949)

The heir apparent is the present holder's son, Hon. Rupert Bernard Charles Gerard (b. 1981).

== In France ==
For the French Baron Gérard, created by Napoleon, see François Gérard.
