= Trotha =

Trotha is a German surname. Notable people with the surname include:

- Adolf von Trotha (1868–1940), German admiral
- Hans von Trotha (c. 1450 – 1503), German knight and marshal
- Klaus von Trotha (1938–2025), German politician
- Lothar von Trotha (1848–1920), German military commander

== See also ==
- Caroline Y. Robertson-von Trotha (born 1951), Scottish-German sociologist and cultural scientist, wife of Klaus von Trotha
- Halle-Trotha station, a railway station in Halle (Saale), Germany
- Von Trotha–Firestien Farm, a historic farm in Colorado, United States
- Trotta (disambiguation)
