= Martin Gosselin =

British diplomat

Sir Martin le Marchant Hadsley Gosselin GCVO KCMG CB
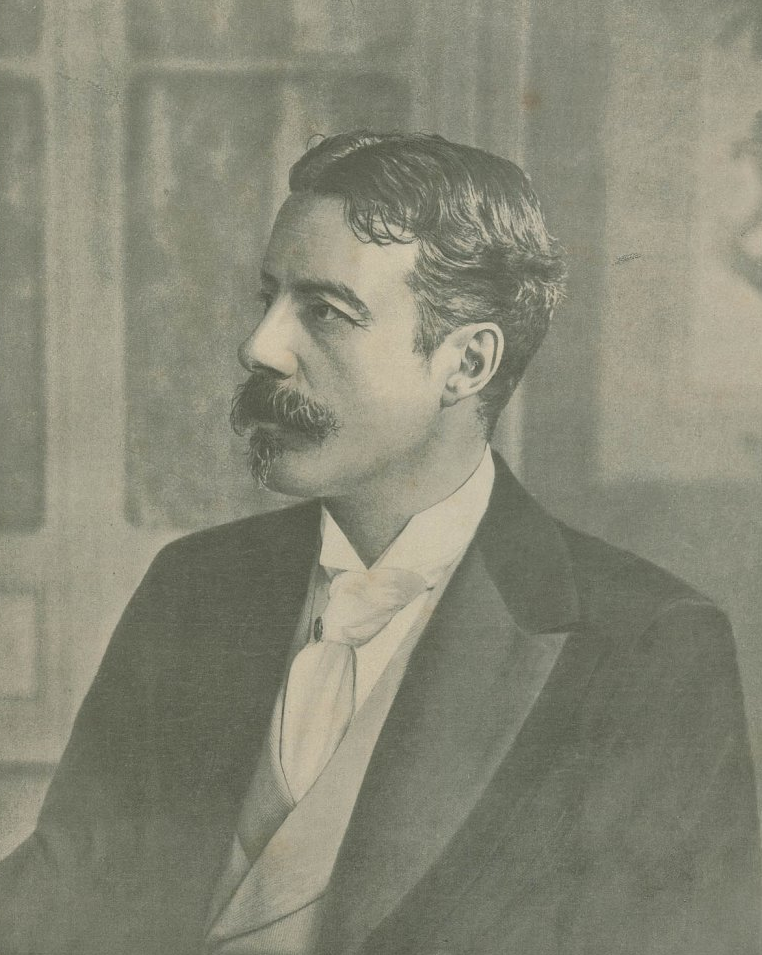
- Sir Martin Gosselin, 1904.

Envoy Extraordinary and Minister Plenipotentiary to Portugal
- In office August 1902 – 26 February 1905
- Preceded by: Hugh Guion MacDonell
- Succeeded by: Francis Hyde Villiers

Assistant Under-Secretary of State for Foreign Affairs
- In office July 1898 – August 1902

Personal details
- Born: 2 November 1847 Walfield, Hertford, Hertfordshire, England
- Died: 26 February 1905 (aged 57) Lisbon, Portugal
- Spouse(s): Katherine Frances Gerard (1856–1924), m. 10 August 1880

Sir Martin le Marchant Hadsley Gosselin, GCVO, KCMG, CB (2 November 1847 – 26 February 1905) was a British diplomat who held the office of Envoy Extraordinary and Minister Plenipotentiary to Portugal.

== Life ==
=== Birth ===
Martin Gosselin was born at Walfield, near Hertford, on 2 November. 1847. He was grandson of Admiral Thomas Le Marchant Gosselin and eldest son of Martin Hadsley Gosselin of Ware Priory and Blakesware, Hertfordshire, by his wife Frances Orris, eldest daughter of Admiral Sir John Marshall of Gillingham House, Kent.

=== Career ===
Gosselin was educated at Eton College, and matriculated at Christ Church, Oxford in 1866. He entered the diplomatic service in 1868, and after working in the Foreign Office was appointed attaché at Lisbon in 1869. He was transferred to Berlin in 1872, where he remained till promoted to be second secretary at Saint Petersburg in 1874. During the Congress of Berlin in 1878 he was attached to the special mission of the British plenipotentiaries, Lord Beaconsfield and Lord Salisbury. He was transferred from Saint Petersburg to Rome in 1879, returned to Saint Petersburg in the following year, and to Berlin in 1882. In 1885 he was promoted to be secretary of legation, and was appointed to Brussels, where he served till 1892, taking charge of the legation at intervals during the absence of the minister, and being employed on occasions on special service.

In November 1887 Gosselin was appointed secretary to the Duke of Norfolk's special mission to Pope Leo XIII on the occasion of the pontiff's jubilee. In 1889 and 1890 he and Alfred Bateman of the Board of Trade served as joint British delegates in the conferences held at Brussels to arrange for the mutual publication of customs tariffs, and in July of the latter year he signed the convention for the establishment of the International Union for the Publication of Customs Tariffs.

Gosselin was also employed as one of the secretaries to the international conference for the suppression of the African slave trade, which sat at Brussels in 1889 and the following year and resulted in the General Act of 2 July 1890. In recognition of his services he was in 1890 made a companion of Order of the Bath (CB). Later in that year he was one of the British delegates at the conference held by representatives of Great Britain, Germany, and Italy to discuss and fix the duties to be imposed on imports in the so-called conventional basin of the Congo, as defined in 1884–5 by the Berlin Conference; and he signed the agreement which was arrived at in December 1890.

In April 1892 Gosselin was promoted to be secretary of embassy at Madrid, was transferred to Berlin in the following year, and to Paris in 1896, receiving at the latter post the titular rank of minister plenipotentiary. In 1897 he was selected to discuss with French commissioners the question of coolie emigration from British India to Réunion, and in that and the following year he served as one of the British members of the Anglo-French commission for the delimitation of the possessions and spheres of influence of the two countries to the east and west of the Niger river. The arrangement arrived at by the commission was embodied in a convention signed at Paris on 14 June 1898, and provided a solution of questions which had threatened relations between the two countries. At the close of these negotiations he was created Knight Commander of the Order of St Michael and St George (KCMG).

From July 1898 to August 1902 he held the home appointment of Assistant Under-Secretary of State for Foreign Affairs. That month he was appointed British envoy to the Court at Lisbon. He was received by King Edward VII at Balmoral Castle in early October, before his departure for Portugal. He held this post till his death in Lisbon on 26 February 1905 from the delayed effects of a motor-car accident.

== Awards and honours ==
Upon the state visit to the United Kingdom of the King and Queen of Portugal, Gosselin was made a Knight Grand Cross of the Royal Victorian Order (GCVO) by King Edward VII.

== Family ==
Gosselin converted to Catholicism in 1878. He married in 1880 Katherine Frances Gerard (1856–1924), daughter of Robert Tolver Gerard, 1st Baron Gerard of Bryn, and left one son, Alwyn Bertram Robert Raphael Gosselin, a captain in the Grenadier Guards killed in 1915, and three daughters.

== See also ==
- Digby Mackworth Dolben

Diplomatic posts
Preceded by Hugh Guion MacDonell	Envoy Extraordinary and Minister Plenipotentiary at the Court of His Majesty the King of Portugal; 1902–1905	Succeeded by Francis Hyde Villiers
