= Trotta =

Trotta may refer to:

== People ==
- Diego Trotta (born 1978), Argentine footballer
- Fatima Trotta (born 1986), Italian actress
- Ivano Trotta (born 1977), Italian football manager
- Liz Trotta (born 1937), American journalist
- Marcello Trotta (born 1992), Italian footballer
- Nicolás Trotta (born 1976), Argentine politician
- Roberto Trotta (born 1969), Argentine football manager
- Margarethe von Trotta (born 1942), German film director and actress
- Michael John Trotta (born 1978), American musical composer and conductor

== Other uses ==
- Trotta (film), a 1971 West German film directed by Johannes Schaaf

== See also ==
- Trotha
- Trotter (disambiguation)
