= Laurence Oliphant (British Army officer) =

British Army General

General Sir Laurence Oliphant KCB KCVO JP
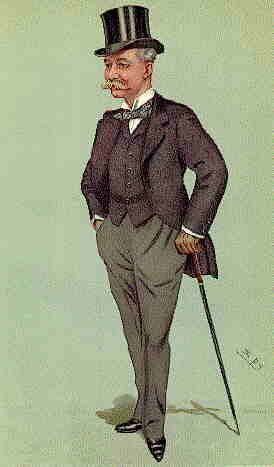
- Born: 14 December 1846
- Died: 6 July 1914 (aged 67)
- Military career
- Allegiance: United Kingdom
- Branch: British Army
- Rank: General
- Units: Sudan Campaign; Second Boer War
- Commands: Northern Command; Home District
- Awards: Knight Commander of the Order of the Bath; Knight Commander of the Royal Victorian Order; Mentioned in Despatches

General Sir Laurence James Oliphant, KCB, KCVO, JP, 9th of Condie and 31st Chief of Clan Oliphant (14 December 1846 – 6 July 1914) was a British Army general who reached high office in the early years of the twentieth century.

== Military career ==
Oliphant was commissioned into the Grenadier Guards in October 1866, was promoted to lieutenant and captain in December 1869, and to captain and lieutenant-colonel in December 1876. He was regimental major from November 1882, and served in the Sudan Campaign in 1885. Promoted to colonel in 1886, he was lieutenant-colonel in command of the 3rd battalion from October 1889, and colonel in command of the Grenadier Guards Regiment from July 1894.

Oliphant was promoted to major general on 26 November 1898, and in February 1900 received a temporary appointment commanding the Militia at Aldershot. Later the same year he went to South Africa to serve in the Second Boer War, where he was in command of the Elandsfontein district and Klerksdorp sub-district. For his service he was mentioned in despatches (including by Lord Kitchener dated 23 June 1902), and was created a Companion of the Order of the Bath (CB) in the October 1902 South Africa Honours list. After the end of the war in June 1902, he had stayed on in South Africa for several months as general officer in command of the Potchefstroom district. He left Cape Town on the SS Kildonan Castle in late November, arriving home the following month. On his return he was appointed a Commander of the Royal Victorian Order (CVO) in the November 1902 Birthday Honours list, and was invested with the insignias of both CB and CVO by King Edward VII at Buckingham Palace on 18 December 1902.

Laurence was appointed Major General commanding the Brigade of Guards and general officer commanding the 9th Brigade and Home District for three years from 1 January 1903. He then served as general officer commanding-in-chief for Northern Command in 1907; he was promoted to general on 19 March 1911 and retired from the army in November 1913.

He later held the office of justice of the peace for Perthshire.

== Family ==
Laurence was the only son of Laurence Oliphant, 8th of Condie, Member of Parliament for Perth who died when Laurence was sixteen.

In 1878 Oliphant married Hon. Mary Monica Gerard, daughter of Robert Gerard, 1st Baron Gerard, and together they had two sons and a daughter. His ancestral seat, Newton of Condie, was destroyed by fire in 1864.

Military offices
Preceded by Sir Henry Trotter	GOC Home District; 1903–1906	Succeeded by Sir Frederick Stopford; As GOC London District
Preceded by Sir Leslie Rundle	GOC-in-C Northern Command; 1907–1911	Succeeded by Sir Herbert Plumer
