= John Trotter =

John Trotter may refer to:

- John Trotter (painter) (1752–1792), Irish painter
- John Trotter (MP) (died 1856), British Member of Parliament for West Surrey
- John Trotter Brockett (1788–1842), British attorney, antiquarian, numismatist, and philologist
- Henry John Trotter (1835–1888), English barrister, railway director and Conservative politician
- John Trotter (Fijian politician) (died 1954), Australian member of the Fijian Legislative Council
- John Scott Trotter (1908–1975), American musical conductor and arranger known for his work with Bing Crosby
- John K. Trotter (born 1934), American lawyer, judge, and mediator
- John Trotter (drummer) (born 1966), drummer with Manfred Mann's Earth Band

== See also ==
- Trotter (disambiguation)
