= William Bruère Otter =

English Anglican cleric (1805–1876)

The Venerable William Bruère Otter
- Archdeacon of Lewes
- Church: Church of England
- Elected: 1855
- Term ended: 1876 (death)
- Predecessor: Julius Hare
- Successor: John Hannah
- Other post: Prebendary of Chichester

Personal details
- Born: 28 May 1805
- Died: 25 June 1876 (aged 71) Cowfold, West Sussex
- Parents: William Otter; Nancy Sadleir Bruère Otter
- Spouse: Elizabeth Melvil
- Children: 10
- Education: Rugby School; Charterhouse School
- Alma mater: King's College, Cambridge

William Bruère Otter (28 May 1805 – 25 June 1876) was an Anglican cleric who was the archdeacon of Lewes from 1855 until his death in 1876.

== Early life ==
Otter was born on 28 May 1805 as the eldest son of The Right Reverend William Otter, Bishop of Chichester and his wife, Nancy Sadleir (née Bruère) Otter. Among his siblings were Sophia Otter (wife of the Rev. Henry Malthus, a son of Thomas Robert Malthus), Caroline Charlotte Otter (wife of John Romilly, 1st Baron Romilly), Maria Otter (wife of Sir William Milbourne James, Lord Justice of Appeal), and Amelia Harriet Otter (wife of Edward Strutt, 1st Baron Belper).

He was educated at Rugby, Charterhouse and King's College, Cambridge, graduating BA in 1828.

== Career ==
Otter was ordained in 1830, he was vicar of Eyeworth from 1832 to 1836, vicar of Kinlet from 1837 to 1847, vicar of Cowfold from 1839 to 1876 and prebendary of Chichester from 1850 to 1876.

== Personal life ==
Otter was married to Elizabeth Melvil (1814–1892). Together, they had four sons and six daughters, including:

- William Otter (1840–1870), a Lieutenant of the Royal Navy.
- Robert Melvil Barry Otter, later Otter-Barry (1845–1917), who married Isabel Louisa Wolryche-Whitmore (1847–1905).

He died at Cowfold on 25 June 1876.

=== Descendants ===
Through his son Robert, he was the grandfather of Hugh Otter-Barry, Bishop of Mauritius from 1931 to 1959.

Church of England titles
Preceded by Julius Hare	Archdeacon of Lewes; 1855–1876	Succeeded by John Hannah
