= Ron Trotter =

New Zealand businessman

Sir Ron Trotter
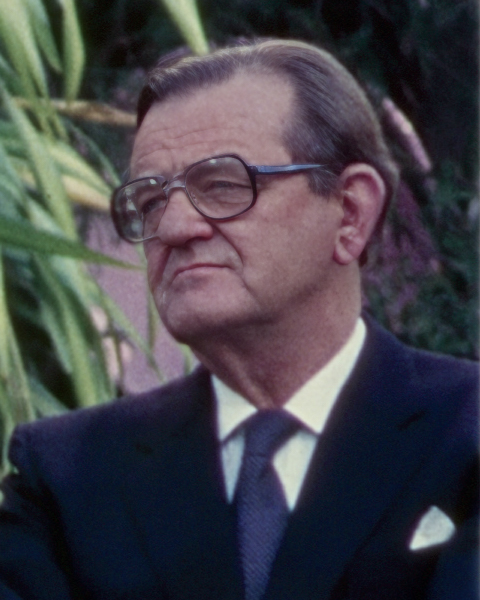
- Trotter in 1988
- Born: Ronald Ramsay Trotter; 9 October 1927; Hāwera, New Zealand
- Died: 11 August 2010 (aged 82); Wellington, New Zealand
- Education: Wanganui Collegiate School
- Alma mater: Victoria University College; Canterbury Agricultural College
- Occupation: Businessman
- Relatives: Ann Trotter (sister); Judith Trotter (sister)

Sir Ronald Ramsay Trotter (9 October 1927 – 11 August 2010) was one of New Zealand's pre-eminent business leaders. He was knighted for his service to business in 1985.

== Early life and family ==
Born in Hāwera on 9 October 1927, Trotter was the son of Annie Euphemia Trotter (née Young) and Clement George Trotter. He was educated at Wanganui Collegiate School, and went on to study at Victoria University College from 1945 to 1947, graduating Bachelor of Commerce, followed by a year at Canterbury Agricultural College where he completed a Certificate of Agriculture.

In 1955, Trotter married Margaret Patricia Rainey, and the couple went on to have four children.

== Business career ==
Trotter was instrumental in the formation of Fletcher Challenge Corporation in 1981, where he was the chief executive and chairman.

=== Directorships and management roles ===
- managing director and Chairman of Wright Stephenson and Co (1958–72)
- Chairman and managing director Challenge Corporation (1970–1981)
- Chairman and Chief Executive of Fletcher Challenge (1981–87)
- Chairman Fletcher Challenge (1987–90)
- Trustee and Chairman of the New Zealand Institute of Economic Research (1973–86)
- Chairman of Telecom Corporation of New Zealand
- Director of Air New Zealand (1989–93)
- Director and Chairman of Toyota New Zealand (1964–2001)
- Inaugural Chairman of the New Zealand Business Roundtable (1985–1990)

=== Public sector roles ===
Trotter made substantial contributions to the public sector. His roles included:

- Chairman of the Steering Committee of the New Zealand Economic Summit Conference of 1984
- Director of the Reserve Bank of New Zealand
- Chairman of the State-owned Enterprises Advisory Committee (1987–88)
- Chairman of the Museum of New Zealand Te Papa Tongarewa
- Chairman of Post Office Bank (1989)
- Member and Chairman of the Oversees Investment Commission (1974–77)
- Chairman of the Interim Provider Board

== Honours ==
In the 1985 Queen's Birthday Honours, Trotter was appointed a Knight Bachelor, for services to business management. In 1999, he was inducted into the New Zealand Business Hall of Fame.

== Other activities ==
Trotter was also an art collector and, along with his wife Margaret, Lady Trotter, played an instrumental role in the formation of the Fletcher Challenge Art Collection.
