= James Trotter =

James Trotter may refer to:

- James Trotter (British Army officer) (1849–1940), British general
- James Trotter (Ontario politician) (1923–1989), Canadian politician from Ontario
- James Trotter (tennis) (born 1999), Japanese tennis player
- James F. Trotter (1802–1866), American politician and judge from Mississippi
- James Monroe Trotter (1842–1892), soldier and African American rights activist
- James Henry Trotter, title character of Roald Dahl's James and the Giant Peach

== See also ==
- Jimmy Trotter (1899–1984), English football player and manager
