= Trotter Prize =

Trotter Prize may refer to:

- The Mildred Trotter Prize, an undergraduate anthropology award named for Mildred Trotter
- The Trotter Prize (Texas A&M) an award for work on intelligent design
