= Margaret Trotter =

New Zealand philanthropist (born 1931)

Margaret Patricia Trotter, Lady Trotter (née Rainey; born 11 September 1931) is a retired philanthropist and community leader from New Zealand.

== Biography ==
Trotter was born on the North Shore, Auckland. Her parents had emigrated to New Zealand from Ireland in 1920. She attended Hastings High School and Woodford House.

Trotter and her husband formed what became a part of the Fletcher Challenge Art Collection, which is now one of the largest curated private collections of New Zealand art. Trotter was a founding trustee and life member of the Wellington Sculpture Trust, an organisation which was established in 1983 to support innovative public art in the city.

Trotter's other community roles included positions with United World College, the Salvation Army Advisory Board, the Board of Wanganui Collegiate School and Wellington Sea Rescue Service.

=== Personal life ===
Trotter was married to businessman Ron Trotter until his death in 2010.
