= Ann Trotter =

New Zealand historian (1932–2022)

Ann Trotter ONZM
- Born: Alison Ann Trotter; 23 January 1932; Hāwera, New Zealand
- Died: 14 July 2022 (aged 90); Wellington, New Zealand
- Relatives: Ron Trotter (brother); Judith Trotter (sister)

Academic background
- Education: St Cuthbert's College; University of Otago
- Alma mater: London School of Economics
- Thesis: British policy in East Asia 1933–1936 (1972)
- Doctoral advisor: Ian Nish

Academic work
- Discipline: Historian
- Sub-discipline: Asian history
- Institutions: University of Otago

Alison Ann Trotter ONZM (23 January 1932 – 14 July 2022) was a New Zealand historian. She was the first woman to be appointed pro vice-chancellor of the University of Otago.

== Early life and education ==
Alison Ann Trotter was born in Hāwera, New Zealand on 23 January 1932, daughter of Pan and Clement George Trotter. She was educated at Hāwera Main Primary School, before undertaking her secondary schooling at St Cuthbert's College in Auckland from 1945 to 1949, where she was head girl in her final year.

She graduated from the University of Otago with a master of arts in 1953, followed by teacher training at Auckland Training College.

== Career ==
Trotter taught history and social studies at Epsom Girls' Grammar School from 1959 to 1968, where she influenced Helen Clark, later prime minister of New Zealand. She left to study in England, completing a Master of Arts degree at the School of Oriental and African Studies, followed by a PhD at the London School of Economics, where her research focussed on Asian history.

In 1973, Trotter returned to New Zealand to lecture in Asian history at the University of Otago, rising to become a full professor in 1993. She served as pro vice-chancellor at the University of Otago from 1993 to 1997, the first woman to fill this role.

Trotter was appointed an Officer of the New Zealand Order of Merit in the 1997 Queen's Birthday Honours, for services to historical research. She retired from the University of Otago in 1998, receiving the title of emeritus professor, and moved to Wellington.

Trotter died in Wellington on 14 July 2022.

== Selected publications ==
- Trotter, Ann (1975). Britain and East Asia, 1933–1937. London: Cambridge University Press. ISBN 0-521-20475-5. OCLC 1322250.
- Trotter, Ann (1990). New Zealand and Japan, 1945–1952 : the occupation and the peace treaty. London: Athlone Press. ISBN 0-485-11398-8. OCLC 21482828.
- Trotter, Ann (2003). Mary Potter's Little Company of Mary : the New Zealand experience, 1914-2002. Little Company of Mary. Wellington [N.Z.]: Bridget Williams Books. ISBN 1-877242-31-4. OCLC 71241610.
