= Alexander Strange =

Alexander Strange (27 April 1818 – 9 March 1876) was a British army officer in India and took part there in the Great Trigonometrical Survey. After retirement from the army he settled in Britain; he supervised the construction of scientific instruments used in surveying, and supported scientific research.

== Early life ==
Strange was born in Westminster, London on 27 April 1818, son of Sir Thomas Andrew Lumisden Strange and his second wife Louisa, daughter of Sir William Burroughs, 1st Baronet. He was educated at Harrow School, and left aged 16 for India, on receiving a commission in the 7th Madras light cavalry (22 June 1834). He was promoted lieutenant on 10 May 1837.

== Survey of India ==
In India his natural bent for mechanical science and his inventive faculty soon declared themselves. After studying at the Magnetic and Meteorological Observatory at Simla, Strange was appointed in 1847 second assistant to the Great Trigonometrical Survey of India. He was employed on the "Karachi longitudinal series", extending from the Sironj base in Central India to Karachi, and crossing the Thar Desert north of the Rann of Kutch. When the work was begun in 1850 Strange acted as first assistant to Captain Renny Tailyour, but after the first season Tailyour withdrew and Strange took chief command.

While at work in the Thar Desert, the absence of materials for building the necessary platforms, besides the need of providing a commissariat for two hundred men, taxed all the leader's resources. The triangulation of the section was completed on 22 April 1853. The series was 668 miles (1,075 km) long, consisting of 173 principal triangles, and covering an area of 20,323 miles (32,707 km). After this work was ended, Strange joined the surveyor-general, Sir Andrew Scott Waugh, at his camp at Attock, and took part in measuring a verificatory base-line. He then bore the designation of "astronomical assistant". In 1855 he joined the surveyor-general's headquarters office, and in 1856 was placed in charge of the triangulation southwards from Calcutta (present-day Kolkata) to Madras (present-day Chennai), along the east coast. In 1859 he was promoted to the rank of major, and, in accordance with the regulations, retired from the survey. He received the special thanks of the government of India.

== Inspector of scientific instruments for India ==
Returning home in January 1861, Strange retired from the army in December of the same year with the rank of lieutenant-colonel. As soon as he settled in England he persuaded the Indian government to establish a department for the inspection of scientific instruments for use in India, and was appointed to organise it, and to the office of inspector in 1862.

Hitherto the system followed by the government in supervising the construction of scientific instruments for official use had been to keep a stock of patterns, invite tenders for copying them, and accept the lowest, thus preventing any chance of improvement in the type of instrument, and affording no guarantee for good workmanship or material. Strange abolished the patterns, encouraged invention, insured competition as to price by employing at least two makers for each class of instrument, and enforced strict supervision; a marked improvement in design and workmanship was soon evident, and the cost of the establishment was shown in his first decennial report to be only about .028 of one per cent. of the outlay on the works which the instruments were employed in designing or executing.

For the trigonometrical survey he himself designed and superintended the construction of a set of massive standard instruments: a great theodolite with a horizontal circle of 3 feet (0.91 m) diameter, and a vertical circle of 2 feet (0.61 m) diameter (these circles were read by means of micrometre microscopes); two zenith sectors with arc of 18 inches (46 cm) radius and telescope of 4 feet (1.2 m) focal length; two 5 feet (1.5 m) transit instruments for determining of longitude, with special arrangements for detecting flexure of the telescope; with others, which all exhibited important developments from previously accepted types.

== Royal Society and other societies ==
Strange was elected a fellow of the Royal Geographical Society and of the Royal Astronomical Society in 1861, and of the Royal Society on 2 June 1864. He took an active part in their proceedings. He served on the council of the Astronomical Society from 1863 to 1867, and as foreign secretary from 1868 to 1873. He contributed several papers to the society's journals. He was on the council of the Royal Society from 1867 to 1869.

A lover of science for its own sake, he long preached the duty of government to support scientific research, especially in directions where discovery, though enriching the community, brings no benefit to the inventor. To this advocacy was mainly due the appointment in 1870 of the Royal Commission on Scientific Instruction, which adopted and recommended many of his suggestions.

== Family life ==
He married Adelaide, daughter of the Reverend William Davies, on 17 October 1848 at Landour, India. They had three daughters and a son, Alexander Burroughs Strange, who became a civil engineer in Madras.

Strange died in Kensington, London on 9 March 1876, of "Indian fever" and a feeble heart.
