= Thomas Trotter =

Thomas Trotter may refer to several people:

- Thomas Trotter (impresario), (1779–1851), English theatrical impresario
- Thomas Trotter (physician), (1760–1832), Scottish naval doctor and abolitionist
- Thomas Trotter (trade unionist), (1871–1932), English trade unionist
- Thomas Trotter (musician), (born 1957), English concert organist
