= William Trotter =

William Trotter may refer to:

- Bill Trotter (William Felix Trotter, 1908–1984), major league baseball pitcher
- William Monroe Trotter (1872–1934), American newspaper editor and civil rights activist
- William R. Trotter (1943–2018), American author and historian
- William T. Trotter, American mathematician
- William Trotter (cabinet-maker) (1772–1833), Scottish furniture maker and Lord Provost of Edinburgh, 1825–27
- Will Trotter, English television producer

== See also ==
- Willie Trotter (born 1959), English post-punk musician
