= Thomas Lumisden Strange =

English Judge and Writer

- Born: 4 January 1808; Madras India
- Died: 4 September 1884 (aged 76); Norwood
- Occupation: Author
- Relatives: Thomas Andrew Lumisden Strange (father); Louisa (Burroughs) Strange (mother)

Thomas Lumisden Strange (1808–1884) was an English judge and writer.

== Life ==
Born on 4 January 1808, he was eldest son of Sir Thomas Andrew Lumisden Strange. He was educated at Westminster School, and on leaving in 1823 went out to his father in India, becoming a writer in the East India Company's civil service at Madras in 1825.

Strange was appointed an assistant-judge and joint criminal judge on 24 June 1831, became sub-judge at Calicut in 1843 and civil and sessions judge at Tellicherry in 1845. He was a special commissioner for investigating the Molpah disturbances in Malabar in 1852, and for inquiring into the system of judicature in the presidency of Madras in 1859, and was made judge of the high court of judicature in 1862.

Strange was a member of the Plymouth Brethren for twenty years. He later abandoned Christianity and became a convert to Hinduism.

Strange resigned on 2 May 1863. He died at Norwood on 4 September 1884.

== Works ==
He compiled a Manual of Hindoo Law, 1856, taking his father's work as a basis. This reached a second edition in 1863. He also published "A Letter to the Governor of Fort St. George on Judicial Reform" (1860).

While in India he was much interested in religious subjects. In 1852 he published The Light of Prophecy and Observations on Mr. Elliott's "Horæ Apocalypticæ". Subsequently he was so impressed by observing a supposed convert at the gallows proclaim his faith to be in Rama, not in Christ, that, on examining Christian evidence, his own faith in Christianity broke down.

He never ceased to be a pious theist. He explained his position in "How I became and ceased to be a Christian", and many other pamphlets for the series published in 1872–1875 by Thomas Scott (1808–1878); these publications were afterwards collected and issued as Contributions to a Series of Controversial Writings (1881). Larger works by Strange were:

- The Bible: is it the Word of God? 1871.
- The Speaker's Commentary reviewed, 1871.
- The Legends of the Old Testament: Traced to Their Apparent Primitive Sources, 1874.
- The Development of Creation on the Earth 1874.
- The Sources and Development of Christianity, 1875.
- What is Christianity? 1880.
- Light of Prophecy; Being an Attempt to Trace Out Thereby the Coming Judgments, and the Promised Glory
