= Alys Fane Trotter =

Irish poet and artist

- Born: 16 December 1863; Dublin
- Died: 21 December 1961 (aged 98); Greystones, Teffont Evias.
- Occupation: Artist Poet
- Notable work: Houses and Dreams, Nigel, and other verses, Poems from Punch, Valour and Vision: Poems of the War
- Spouse: Alexander Pelham Trotter (m. 1857–1947)
- Children: 2
- Parents: Maurice Keatinge (father); Ella Flora Mayne (mother)

Alys Fane Trotter (née Keatinge; 16 December 1863 – 21 December 1961) was an Irish poet and artist.

She was born in Dublin, the daughter of Ella Flora Mayne (1828–1907) and Maurice Keatinge (1816–1896). Maurice was the Principal Registrar at the Irish Court of Probate; his wife from a long established Wiltshire family with an estate at Teffont Evias. The family moved to London when she was young. On 30 June 1886, at St James's Church, Paddington, Alys married Alexander Pelham Trotter (1857–1947). He was the son of banker Alexander Trotter (1804–1865), by his second wife, Isabella Strange (1816–1878), daughter of Thomas Andrew Lumisden Strange.

From 1896 to 1899, Alexander was the Electrical advisor to the Cape Colony government in southern Africa. Whilst living there Alys and Alexander explored the Cape and Alys wrote and illustrated "Old cape Colony: a chronicle of her men and houses from 1652 to 1806". Some of Trotter's drawings are now in the William Fehr Collections in South Africa. See, for example, Head of a Labourer, Pressing Grapes, Old House at Stellenbosch.

When they returned to England they lived at Teffont Evias. Trotter wrote poetry and was published in periodicals including Punch and the Cornhill Magazine.

Alys and Alexander had a son Alexander Nigel, known as Nigel, born in 1894 and a daughter Gundred Eleanor born in 1889. Nigel was killed in action on 12 October 1914 at La Fosse, near Vieille-Chapelle, Béthune:

The ground over which the British had to advance was intersected by small irrigation canals crossed by plank bridges, on which the officers and men offered a good target. Lieut. Trotter is believed to have been first hit while crossing one of these bridges, and after advancing three-quarters of a mile fell with two more wounds.

His death influenced her writing, and her poetry reflected on her life with Nigel and her loss. Her poem collections were: "Nigel, and other verses" by published by Burns & Oates in 1918; and "Houses and Dreams" published by Blackwell, Oxford in 1924. Poems were also included in several anthologies of war poems, including "Poems from Punch 1909 – 1920", published by Macmillan, 1922; Valour and Vision: Poems of the War, 1914 - 1918", edited by Trotter's niece Jacqueline Theodora Trotter and published by Longmans, Green, 1920; and "Valour and Vision" Poems of the War, 1914 - 1918, a new edition, published by Hopkinson, 1923.

Trotter also continued drawing and painting. She died on 21 December 1961 at Greystones in Teffont Evias.

== Family ==
Her daughter Gundred married Horace Courthope Beck, an archaeologist.

Her father's brother was Victoria Cross recipient Lt.-Gen. Richard Harte Keatinge; and Major Sir Edward Mayne Keatinge was her nephew.

Her husband's sister was the missionary Isabel Lilias Trotter; and Jacqueline Theodora Trotter (see above) was the daughter of his step-brother Col. Sir Henry Trotter.

Her cousin, Louisa Kathleen Coutts Trotter (1863–1961), was the wife of the physiologist John Scott Haldane.
