= Henry Trotter (British Army officer) =

British Army officer

Major-General Sir Henry Trotter GCVO DL
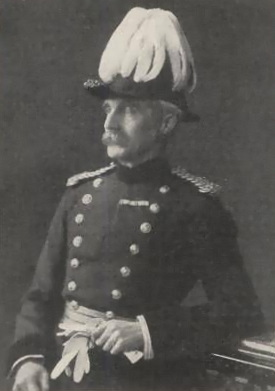
- Trotter in June 1901
- Born: 5 January 1844
- Died: 16 July 1905 (aged 61); Mortonhall, Edinburgh
- Military career
- Allegiance: United Kingdom
- Branch: British Army
- Service years: 1862–1903
- Rank: Major-General
- Commands: Home District
- Awards: Knight Grand Cross of the Royal Victorian Order
- Other work: Edward Henry Trotter (son)

Major-General Sir Henry Trotter, GCVO, DL (5 January 1844 – 16 July 1905) was a senior British Army officer who served as Major General commanding the Brigade of Guards and General Officer Commanding the Home District from 1897 to 1903.

== Military career ==
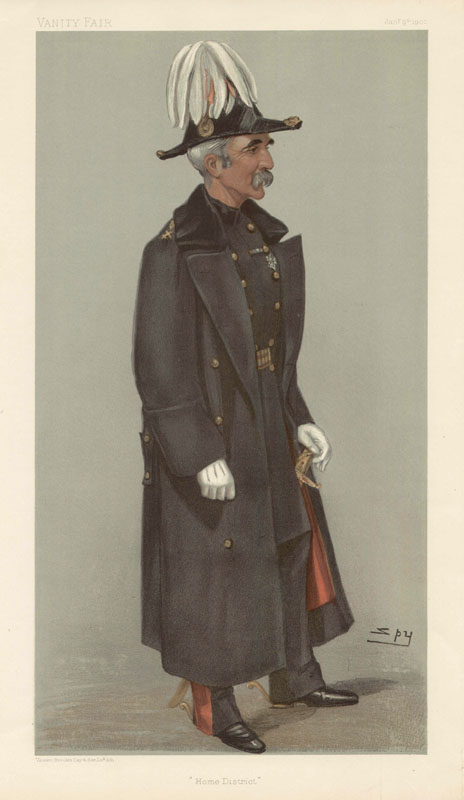
"Home District". Caricature by Spy published in Vanity Fair in 1902

Trotter was commissioned into the Grenadier Guards in 1862.

He was promoted to major general in 1895 and appointed Major General commanding the Brigade of Guards and General Officer Commanding the Home District in 1897, serving until 1903. During preparations for the coronation of King Edward VII in 1902, Trotter acted as Chief Staff Officer to the Duke of Connaught, who was in supreme command of the troops taking part in all military ceremonies connected with the coronation. He was advanced to a Knight Grand Cross of the Royal Victorian Order (GCVO) for his service later the same year, and was invested with the insignia by the King at Buckingham Palace on 18 December 1902.

He lived at Mortonhall in Edinburgh and was Deputy Lieutenant of Berwickshire.

== Family ==
In 1866 he married Hon. Eva Gifford, daughter of Robert Gifford, 2nd Baron Gifford; they went on to have one daughter and four sons (two of whom gained distinction as army officers: Gerald Trotter and Edward Henry Trotter).

Military offices
Preceded by Lord Methuen	GOC Home District; 1897–1903	Succeeded by Sir Laurence Oliphant
