= Gerald Trotter =

British Army officer and courtier (1871–1945)

Brigadier-General Gerald Trotter CB CMG CVO CBE DSO
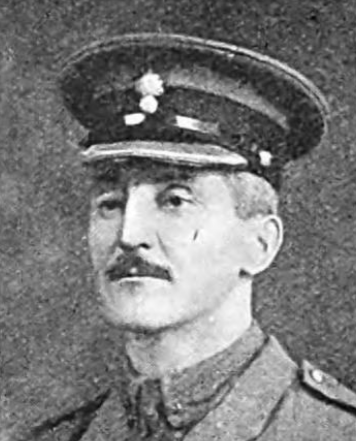
- Born: 21 July 1871
- Died: 14 June 1945 (aged 73)
- Military career
- Allegiance: United Kingdom
- Branch: British Army
- Service years: 1892–1912; 1914–1919
- Rank: Brigadier-General
- Conflicts: Second Boer War; First World War
- Awards: Companion of the Order of the Bath; Companion of the Order of St Michael and St George; Commander of the Royal Victorian Order; Commander of the Order of the British Empire; Distinguished Service Order; Mentioned in Dispatches

Brigadier-General Gerald Frederic Trotter, CB, CMG, CVO, CBE, DSO (21 July 1871 – 14 June 1945) was a British Army officer and courtier.

== Biography ==
Trotter was the son of Major-General Sir Henry Trotter and Hon. Eva Gifford, daughter of Robert Gifford, 2nd Baron Gifford. His younger brother was the army officer, Edward Henry Trotter. Trotter was educated at HMS Britannia, but commissioned into the Royal Scots and transferred to the Grenadier Guards in June 1892. He was promoted to lieutenant on 3 March 1897, and to captain (supernumerary) on 18 November 1899.

He first saw active service in the Second Boer War in South Africa. In March 1900 he was badly wounded when a small foraging party, mainly of officers, including Colonels Crabbe and Codrington, was ambushed at Karee Siding; one man was killed. This episode was generally regarded as "plucky" but widely reported round the world as an example of the "over-confidence and recklessness" (in the words of the New York Tribune) of British officers. Trotter′s arm was amputated after the incident, but despite his incapacity, he returned to the war and was mentioned in despatches in September 1901. That same month he was created a Companion of the Distinguished Service Order (DSO). On 3 June 1901 he was appointed a superintendent of gymnasia.

Following the end of the war in May 1902, Trotter received a regular commission as a captain in his regiment in July 1902, and returned to the United Kingdom on board the SS Lake Michigan with a large contingent of men from the guards regiments in October 1902.

Trotter was made Member of the Royal Victorian Order (MVO) in 1906 while he was Aide-de-Camp to the Governor General of Canada, was promoted to major on 8 August 1907 and retired from the regular army on 27 July 1912, joining the Reserve of Officers of the Grenadier Guards.

He rejoined the regiment following the outbreak of the First World War in 1914, and served with the 1st Battalion, Grenadier Guards in France from 1914 until 1916. In 1915, he was appointed temporary lieutenant colonel in command of the 1st Battalion until 17 March 1916, when he was promoted to brigadier general in command of 27th Brigade. His command of the brigade was brief, as he was injured on 2 May. He was then appointed to command 51st Brigade on 6 July 1916, which appointment he held until June 1917. In October 1917, he was appointed brigadier general on the general staff to command the British Military Mission (Training) to the US. Trotter was mentioned in dispatches in January and June 1916 and was created a Companion of the Order of St Michael and St George (CMG) in the 1916 Birthday Honours. He was further mentioned in dispatches in January and June 1917, and was made Companion of the Order of the Bath in the 1917 Birthday Honours. On 19 December 1918, he was given the honorary rank of brigadier general. He was awarded the Distinguished Service Medal by the US government in 1919. He was appointed a Commander of the Order of the British Empire (CBE) in 1919 in connection with war service.

Trotter served as Gentleman Usher to George V between 1919 and in 1936, Groom-in-Waiting in 1921 and Extra Equerry to the Prince of Wales in 1925. He was made Commander of the Royal Victorian Order in the 1926 Birthday Honours.
