= Edward Henry Trotter =

British Army officer (1872-1916)

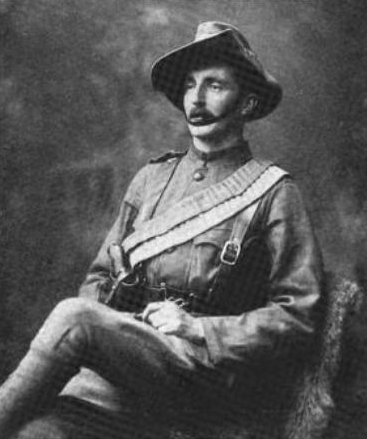
- In The Sketch, 26 June 1901
- Born: 1 December 1872; London, England
- Died: 8 July 1916 (aged 43); Somme, France
- Burial place: Peronne Road Cemetery, Maricourt, France
- Relatives: Major General Sir Henry Trotter (father)
- Military career
- Allegiance: United Kingdom
- Branch: British Army
- Service years: 1893–1916
- Rank: Lieutenant colonel
- Commands: 18th Battalion, The King's (Liverpool Regiment)
- Conflicts: Mahdist War; Second Boer War; First World War
- Awards: Distinguished Service Order; Mentioned in dispatches

Lieutenant Colonel Edward Henry Trotter, DSO (1 December 1872 – 8 July 1916) was a British Army officer who commanded the 18th Battalion, The King's (Liverpool Regiment) during the First World War.

== Early life ==
He was born in London, the son of Major General Sir Henry Trotter and Lady Trotter, who maintained an estate at Mortonhall, Midlothian. He was a younger brother of Gerald Trotter. Trotter was commissioned into the Grenadier Guards as a second lieutenant on 28 June 1893, promoted to lieutenant on 23 August 1897, and served in the Sudan expedition of 1898.

== Military career ==
After the outbreak of the Second Boer War in October 1899, a corps of imperial volunteers from London was formed in late December 1899. The corps included infantry, mounted infantry and artillery divisions and was authorized with the name City of London Imperial Volunteers. It proceeded to South Africa in January 1900, returned in October the same year, and was disbanded in December 1900. Lieutenant Trotter was seconded from his regiment and appointed Staff captain to the corps on 1 January 1900, with the temporary rank of Captain in the Army, and served as such until it was disbanded. He was awarded the Distinguished Service Order (DSO) for his services in South Africa on 29 November 1900. In April 1902, Trotter returned to South Africa with a detachment of men from the Guards regiments. Following the end of the war two months later, Trotter and most of the men returned to the United Kingdom on board the SS Lake Michigan in October 1902. He returned to his regiment in February 1903.

Trotter became the commanding officer of the 18th King's shortly after the battalion was formed by the 17th Earl of Derby on 29 August 1914. The Earl's brother, Lieutenant Colonel F.C. Stanley, secured Trotter's command of the 18th, one of four Liverpool "Pals" battalions raised. The battalion was initially located at Hooton racecourse, where they were supervised by NCOs from the Grenadier Guards. The new commanding officer was enthusiastic about physical exercise. In spite of a weak knee as a result of a hunting accident, Trotter would often take part in his battalion's daily exercises. The 18th's prowess in inter-battalion competitions earned it the nickname "Trotter's Greyhounds".

After landing at Boulogne, France in November 1915, Trotter's battalion was moved to the Somme area. On 1 July 1916, on the first day of the Somme offensive, the 18th King's advanced with their division towards Montauban. Located on the left flank of the French, to the south of where the British Army sustained most of its casualties on the first day, the 30th Division began its advance at 07:30. An effective French bombardment ensured the advance encountered mostly limited opposition. The 18th King's, however, was subject to relentless fire from German positions during their advance on the Glatz Redoubt. The division's objectives were nevertheless achieved, one of the few successes of 1 July. Trotter estimated the 18th had suffered about 500 casualties on the first-day.

Reduced to minimal strength, the 18th was withdrawn from the front and converted to a carrier battalion. When it was ordered to move forward on 8 July, Trotter decided to oversee the movement personally and arrived before the battalion. The troop movements prompted the Germans to bombard the area. A shell landed in the entrance to brigade headquarters, killing Trotter, a lieutenant, two other ranks, and mortally wounding Lieutenant Colonel William Smith of the 18th Manchesters.

Trotter is buried at Péronne Road Cemetery, Maricourt. One of his brothers, Reginald, was killed on 9 May 1915 while serving with the Cameron Highlanders on the Western Front.
