= Edward Trotter (priest) =

Edward Bush Trotter (10 December 1842 – 14 July 1920) was an Anglican Archdeacon in the late nineteenth and early twentieth centuries.

Trotter was educated at Christ's College, Cambridge and ordained in 1867. After a curacy at Holy Trinity, Habergham Eaves he was Vicar of Alnwick, Northumberland, Domestic Chaplain to the Duke of Northumberland; Chaplain to the Tynemouth Volunteer Artillery; and an Honorary Canon at Newcastle Cathedral.

He was Rector of St Stephen's Savanna Grande, Trinidad from 1890 to 1901; Canon of Holy Trinity Cathedral, Trinidad from 1896 to 1903; and Archdeacon and Vicar general of Trinidad from 1896 to 1903.He was Archdeacon of Western Downs and a Canon of Brisbane Cathedral, Queensland from 1903 to 1908 when he was placed in charge of the Anglican congregations throughout Venezuela. He retired to Bournemouth in 1916 and died there four years later.
