= Bryn, Greater Manchester =

Coordinates: 53.499°N 2.657°W

Bryn
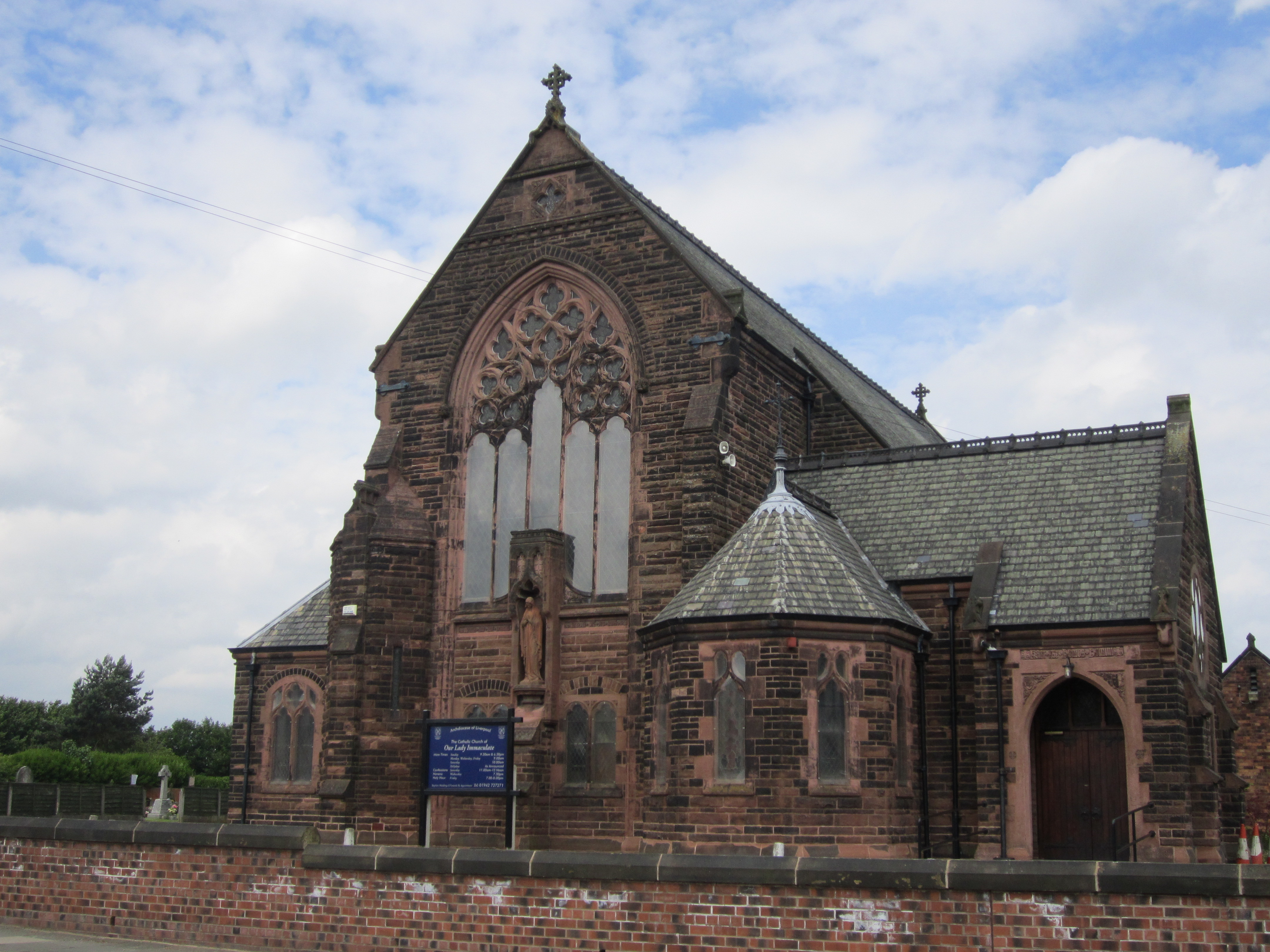
- Church of Our Lady Immaculate

- Location within Greater Manchester
- Population: 11,662 (2011 Census)
- OS grid reference: SD565005
- Metropolitan borough: Wigan
- Metropolitan county: Greater Manchester
- Region: North West
- Country: England
- Sovereign state: United Kingdom
- Post town: WIGAN
- Postcode district: WN4
- Dialling code: 01942
- Police: Greater Manchester
- Fire: Greater Manchester
- Ambulance: North West
- UK Parliament: Makerfield

Bryn is a suburb of Ashton-in-Makerfield in the Metropolitan Borough of Wigan in Greater Manchester, England. The population of the suburb at the 2011 census was 11,662. Served by Bryn railway station, Bryn is home to the Three Sisters Recreation Area which has been created from three large spoil tips which remain from Bryn's role in Lancashire's coal mining past.

== Toponymy ==
The name Bryn is most likely derived from Cumbric brïnn, meaning 'hill' (compare with modern Welsh: bryn). Alternatively, the name may be derived directly from the Welsh equivalent, possibly reflecting Welsh settlement in the 12th century. A third explanation is that the name is derived from Old English bryne, 'burning, fire', suggestive of land cleared by burning.

== History ==
The former Bryn (or Brynne) Hall was the seat of the Gerard family beginning in the thirteenth century or earlier. It was a "safe house" for the English Roman Catholic martyr and saint Edmund Arrowsmith and his hand was reportedly preserved there after his execution. The house, dating to the fourteenth century, has now completely collapsed and remaining stones have been cleared.

The Roman Catholic parish of Our Lady of Good Counsel was founded in 1896. In 1902 the foundation stone of the church was laid by the Bishop of Liverpool, Thomas Whiteside. The church, on Downall Green Road, opened on 21 October 1903. On 8 September 1955 the church was consecrated and the holy relics of two early Roman martyrs – Saints Speciosi and Fructuosi, were placed in the altar stone.

The Unitarian Park Lane Chapel in Wigan Road was built in 1697, though its congregation was founded in 1662. It is the oldest Non-conformist chapel and congregation in the whole district. By the nineteenth century Park Lane was only one of nine non-conformist chapels in the heavily recusant area.

A football club from the village, Brynn [sic] Central, played in the Lancashire Combination in the 1900s.
