= Thomas Andrew Lumisden Strange =

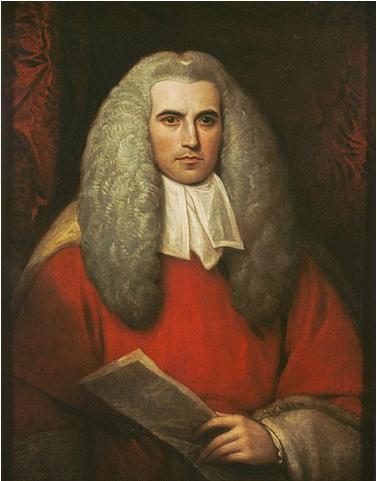
Thomas Andrew Lumisden Strange by Benjamin West, National Gallery of Scotland

Sir Thomas Andrew Lumisden Strange (30 November 1756 – 16 July 1841) was a chief justice in Nova Scotia, known for waging "judicial war" to free Black Nova Scotian slaves from their owners. From 1789 to 1797, he was the sixth Chief Justice of Nova Scotia. He became the first Chief Justice of the erstwhile Supreme Court of Madras (which has since become the High Court of Madras), was in that capacity also the first Chief Justice of the Madras Presidency, British India from 1801 to 1817, and also wrote a two-volume text on Hindu law.

== Chief Justice of Nova Scotia ==
After practicing law for four years, he was appointed Chief Justice of Nova Scotia in 1790, likely helped by his mother's friendship with Lord Mansfield, a cabinet minister. He was sent to Halifax where he served for seven years until 1797. He found many of the cases had to do with relatively small property claims.

He was instrumental in freeing slaves from their owners in the colony. His successor said that "in cases involving runaway slaves Strange required the fullest proof of the master's claim" and that since this was difficult to produce "it was found generally very easy to succeed in favour of the Negro". Blowers, as attorney general, and Strange frequently discussed how to proceed in such matters, and Strange decided to move slowly rather than "throw so much property as it is called into the air at once".

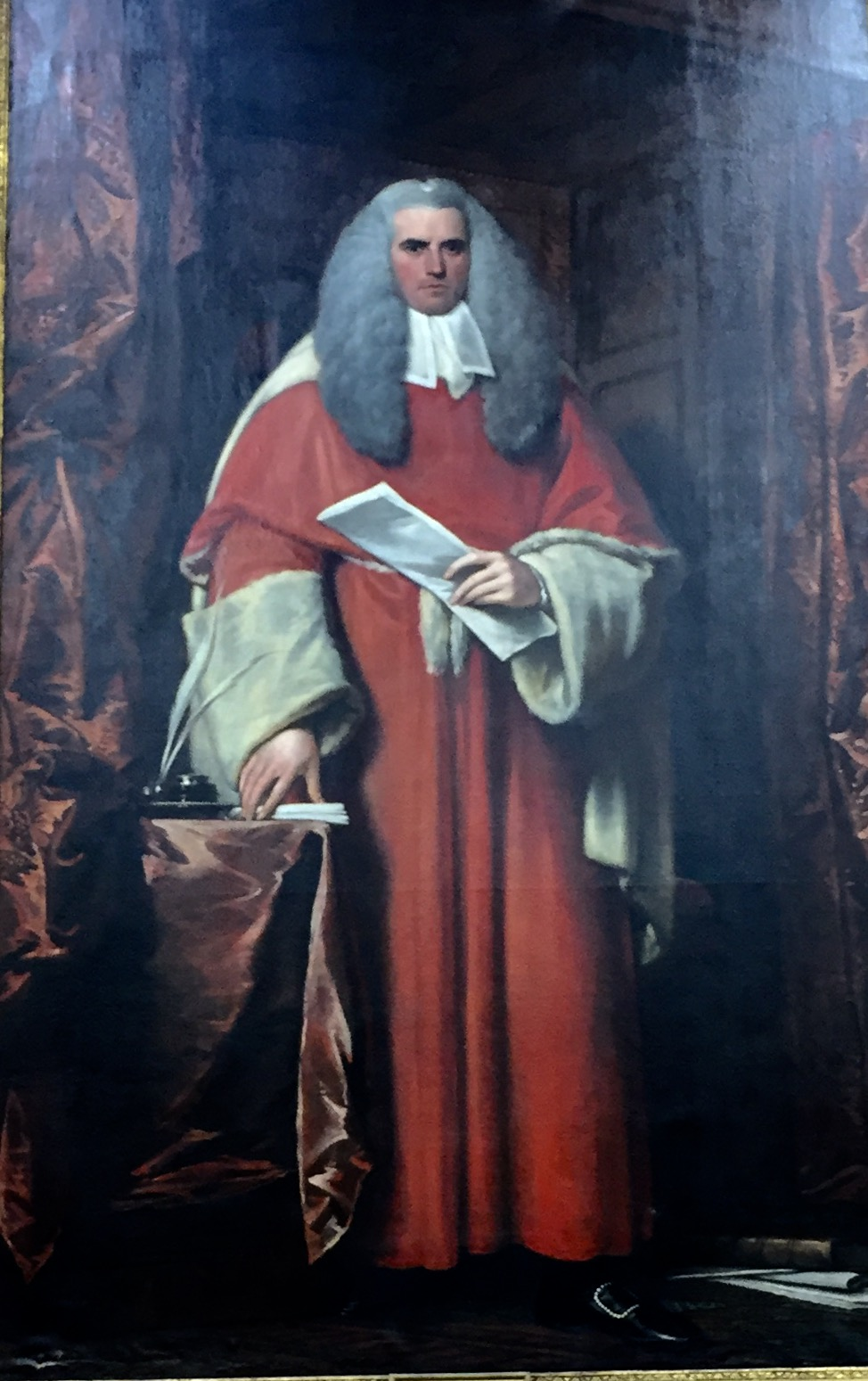
Thomas Andrew Lumisden Strange By Benjamin West, Nova Scotia Supreme Court, Court Room 5, Halifax, Nova Scotia, Canada

Strange supported the development of Kings College from his position on the board of governors. He donated his law library to the lawyers in Nova Scotia, which laid the foundation for the present library of the Nova Scotia Barristers' Society. He also was president of the North British Society.

Benjamin West painted Strange's full-length portrait, which hangs in the Nova Scotia court.

== Assigned to British India ==
Watercolour "Holy men outside Sir Thomas Strange house". In 1800, Strange became the first Chief Justice of the Supreme Court of Fort St. George (Madras), British India.

He moved back to England in July 1796. Strange was knighted on 14 March 1798 and the same year was appointed Recorder of Fort St. George (Madras), British India. In 1800, consequent to the Regulating Act of 1797, the Recorder's Court was superseded by the Supreme Court, and Strange was appointed Chief Justice. He commanded two of the four companies of Madras Militia and played an important role in suppressing the Vellore Mutiny of the soldiers of the East India Company in 1806. He was among the first English judges to study Hindu law and wrote a treatise on the subject after he returned to England, Elements of Hindu Law; referable to British Judicature in India (volume I issued in 1825, and volume II in 1830). A large portrait of Sir Thomas Strange adorns the gallery of the Chief Justice's Court in the Madras High Court.

== Marriage and later years ==
At Fort St. George he married, secondly, to Louisa Burroughs, daughter of Sir William Burroughs, 1st Baronet, on 11 October 1806. (His first wife, Janet Anstruther, whom he married in 1797, died in 1798.) They went on to have several children, including Alexander Strange, an army officer and surveyor in India. In 1840 he married Mary Rose née Tickell and they had a son Thomas Lumisden Strange, a judge and writer.

Strange died at Kempshot Rd, Lower Streatham on 3 September 1841 and was buried in West Norwood Cemetery.

== See also ==
- Company rule in India
- Decline of Slavery in Nova Scotia
