= New Hormones =

British independent record label

- Founded: 1977
- Founder: Richard Boon; Howard Devoto; Pete Shelley
- Defunct: 1982
- Genre: Punk, post-punk
- Country of origin: United Kingdom
- Location: Manchester

New Hormones was a Manchester independent record label founded by Richard Boon and Howard Devoto and Pete Shelley. It was the first independent punk rock label in the UK.

== History ==
=== Beginnings ===
The label's first release was Buzzcocks' Spiral Scratch (EP), which was the second self-released punk record ever (after The Saints "(I'm) Stranded" from Australia), and the third English punk single (preceded only by The Damned's "New Rose", and Sex Pistols's "Anarchy in the U.K."). The band had to borrow £500 from their friends and families to pay for the record's production and manufacture. The EP quickly sold out its initial run of 1,000 copies, and went on to sell 16,000 copies, initially only by mail order, but also eventually with the help of the Manchester branch of music chain store Virgin, whose manager took some copies and persuaded other regional branch managers to follow suit. In late 1977 Devoto officially quit New Hormones in order to concentrate on his new band Magazine. When re-released in 1979 the EP reached 31 on the UK Singles Chart. After this, the band planned to release another EP, titled Love Bites (eventually the name was used as the title to their second album), through the label however when drummer John Maher decided that after graduating he was not going to get a day job and instead play in Buzzcocks for a living they decided to sign to a major label, United Artists.

After the release of Spiral Scratch, several bands planned to release music through New Hormones however for various reasons did not, this includes The Fall, New Hormones paid for the recording session however they could not afford to release what would become Bingo-Master's Break-Out! EP; Boon put it "I would have put [it] out if I’d had the money. I paid for the tapes. Martin Hannett did a shoddy job and things were getting very difficult. I gave Kay Carroll [the band’s then manager] the tapes, she placed them with Step Forward." Both Cabaret Voltaire, and Gang of Four sent tapes to New Hormones however those too could not be released due to lack of money; he did however invite them to open for Buzzcocks at the London release party of Another Music in a Different Kitchen (along with John Cooper Clarke, and The Slits). Cabaret Voltaire later released music through Factory Records, Industrial Records and Rough Trade, while Gang Of Four signed to Fast Product and eventually EMI. Although Buzzcocks left and the label couldn't afford to release other records, it still existed, run mainly by Richard Boon and made its second release in late 1977; it was not even a record, it was a booklet of collages by Linder Sterling and Jon Savage titled The Secret Public.

=== Productive period ===
After that New Hormones did not release anything for more than two years, then in early 1980, after Buzzcocks became less of a serious commitment, and Boon found he had much more money and spare time, and so New Hormones started releasing music again. Over the next two years it released 21 records and three cassettes. Unfortunately, New Hormones could not escape the shadow cast on them and other Manchester independents by Factory Records, "Factory was the hip Manchester label in everyone’s mind so we were always fighting that a bit especially with press, which was so important then," said Pete Wright, who managed Dislocation Dance and later helped run New Hormones, since Spiral Scratch music had changed, many Manchester bands had gone from three-chord punk, to a more experimental Post-punk sound, Factory already had a roster including Joy Division, A Certain Ratio, The Durutti Column and Orchestral Manoeuvres in the Dark. New Hormones did however manage to sign a few bands including Ludus, The Tiller Boys, Eric Random, and God's Gift, amongst others.

=== Death of New Hormones ===
In the early 1980s many independent record labels in England had a system of finding a large band that would score top 40 hits so that the label would have money to release more obscure material, as Boon put it "You have an artist who sells and makes enough money for you to do all the fringe peripheral stuff. Geoff could sell a load of Aztec Camera and sell 4,000 Robert Wyatt on the back of it. Daniel had Depeche, which meant Mute could put out Diamanda Galás. Tony had Joy Division.", after signing Buzzcocks to UA and lacking the means to release music by other hits, New Hormones could not find a similar success. Money was scarce, Ludus' Danger Came Smiling failed to break even, and New Hormones teetered on bankruptcy constantly, and while it did have future plans, it ceased operation in late 1982, and in summer 1983 Boon went to work for Rough Trade, while distribution manager Peter Wright went on to Neutral Records in New York.

Another band that New Hormones had to turn down, this one later in the label's existence, was The Smiths. In late 1982, Morrissey, who was known around the Manchester music scene, came into New Hormones office asking if they would release "Hand in Glove". Boon realized that New Hormones would not have the money to release something of that magnitude and told him to talk to Rough Trade, which led to the band signing to that label.

== The Beach Club ==
Boon and several others related to New Hormones founded a club, The Beach Club, to showcase "cult, weird films with cult, weird bands" said Boon. Eric Random, Sue Cooper (accountant for Buzzcocks and New Hormones), Lindsay Reade (née Lindsay Wilson, Factory Records founder Tony Wilson’s ex-wife) and Suzanne O’Hara (Martin Hannett’s girlfriend). The club followed after the closure of several other Manchester clubs including The Electric Circus and The Factory (which was founded by Alan Erasmus, and Tony Wilson with Martin Hannett, and with the help of Peter Saville evolved into Factory Records). The club opened in April 1980 and was on Newgate Street in Shudehill an area that was at the time filled mostly with abandoned building and porn shops, the club was previously a gay bar.

For Eric Random, "One of the reasons for starting The Beach Club was to do things like Certain Random Cabaret [a joint performance with members of A Certain Ratio and Cabaret Voltaire] – entertaining with the films, but also mixing the groups together. Different combinations of people would play at certain times. They were all just little experiments really. Nothing was focused to anything in the future. They were one-off things." The club itself was not exactly a high end place, Dislocation Dance drummer, Dick Harrison said "It could have out-seeded the club in Blue Velvet." However, during its existence The Beach Club gave many shows including performances by several New Hormones acts along with Section 25, A Certain Ratio, U2 and the first performance of New Order (then unnamed) on 29 July 1980.

The club was very short lived, it closed before 28 February 1981 when Melody Maker said "[The Beach Club closed] when attendance began to drop." The club would be an inspiration for The Haçienda. The location of the club was torn down and a parking garage built in its place. In hindsight Boon said "We didn’t give it a catalogue number, possibly a mistake,".

== Other informations ==
The label's greatest sellers were: Buzzcocks' Spiral Scratch, Dislocation Dance's Rosemary and, Ludus' The Seduction. New Hormones also set up tours for bands on the label, one, titled I Like Shopping, featured Ludus, Dislocation Dance, The Diagram Brothers, Eric Random and the Mudhutters. None of the bands wanted to release a record with the ID Org13. The term Org originated with Org1 (the release ID for Spiral Scratch) or orgone, a reference to Wilhelm Reich's theory on a universal life force.

== Discography ==
=== Records ===
- Org1 01/77 Buzzcocks - "Spiral Scratch EP" (7-inch EP)
- Org2 12/77 Linder/Savage - "The Secret Public" (A3 Collage)
- Org3 03/80 The Tiller Boys - "Big Noise From The Jungle" (7-inch EP)
- Org4 03/80 Ludus - "The Visit" (12-inch)
- Org5 07/80 The Decorators - "Twilight View"(7-inch)
- Org6 09/80 Eric Random - "That's What I Like About Me"(12-inch)
- Org7 07/81 Dislocation Dance - "Perfectly In Control"(7-inch EP)
- Org8 07/81 Ludus - "My Cherry Is In Sherry/Anatomy Is Not Destiny"
- Org9 07/81 Diagram Brothers - "Bricks/Postal Bargains"(7-inch)
- Org10 07/81 Dislocation Dance - "Slip That Disc"(12-inch)
- Org11 05/81 Eric Random - "Dow Chemical Co./Skin Deep"(7-inch)
- Org12 07/81 Ludus - "Mother's Hour/Patient"(7-inch)
- Org14 07/81 God's Gift - "God's Gift"(12-inch EP)
- Org15 07/81 Dislocation Dance - "Music, Music, Music"(LP)
- Org16 09/81 Ludus - "The Seduction"(2×12" LP)
- Org17 11/81 Diagram Brothers - "Some Marvels Of Modern Science"(LP)
- Org18 03/82 Eric Random - "Earth Bound"(LP)
- Org19 06/82 Dislocation Dance - "Rosemary/Shake"(7-inch)
- Org20 09/82 Ludus - "Danger Came Smiling"(LP)
- Org21 07/82 Diagram Brothers - "Discordo"(10-inch EP)
- Org22 10/82 Dislocation Dance - "You'll Never Know/You Can Tell"(7-inch)
- Org25 10/82 God's Gift - "Discipline/Then Calm Again"(7-inch)
- Org30 12/82 Alberto y Lost Trios Paranoias - "Cruising With Santa"(7-inch) (A Christmas charity record for the CND)

=== Limited edition cassettes ===
In 1981, New Hormones released a series of limited edition cassettes (500 each), each came with a booklet, badge, stickers and a sweatshirt offer.

- Cat1 07/81 Ludus - "Pickpocket"
- Cat2 08/91 C.P.Lee - "Mystery Guild Radio Sweat"
- Cat3 09/81 Biting Tongues - "Live It"

== Scrapped releases ==
=== Records ===
- ORG23 Ambrose Reynolds: The World’s Greatest Hits (mini-LP) – later issued by Zulu records
- ORG24 Reserved for Ludus
- ORG26 Biting Tongues: Libreville (LP) – later issued by Paragon Records
- ORG27 Dislocation Dance: Remind Me (single) – later issued by Rough Trade
- ORG28 Reserved for Ludus
- ORG29 Gods Gift: Clamour Club

=== Cassettes ===
- CAT4 Ambrose: 20 Golden Great Assassinations
