= Another Music in a Different Kitchen =

Studio album by Buzzcocks
- Released: 10 March 1978
- Recorded: December 1977 – January 1978
- Studios: Olympic, London
- Genres: Power pop; pop punk; punk rock
- Length: 35:39
- Label: United Artists
- Producer: Martin Rushent

Buzzcocks chronology
Spiral Scratch (1977)	Another Music in a Different Kitchen (1978)	Love Bites (1978)

Singles from Another Music in a Different Kitchen
- 1. "I Don't Mind" Released: 14 April 1978

Another Music in a Different Kitchen is the debut studio album by the English punk rock band Buzzcocks. It was released in March 1978 by the United Artists record label. This was the third line-up of Buzzcocks, with the guitarist Pete Shelley singing following the departure of the original vocalist Howard Devoto and then the firing of the bass guitarist Garth Smith (who had appeared on the "Orgasm Addict"/"Whatever Happened To...?" single). The album includes the single "I Don't Mind", which reached number 55 in the UK Singles Chart in May 1978.

== Composition ==
The first pressing inadvertently gave a songwriting credit for "Fast Cars" to Shelley/Devoto due to it incorporating the riff from the song "Boredom" off the Spiral Scratch EP, though according to Steve Diggle he wrote ninety percent of the song, which was a personal song based on a car crash in which he was involved.

The album was originally conceived with the track "I Need" on side one, but after a test pressing was made, the group felt the song should appear on the second side. A mix-up occurred at the pressing plant and, as a consequence, some early copies of the album contained no "I Need" at all.

== Release ==
The song "I Don't Mind" was released on 14 April 1978 (UK) as the only single from Another Music in a Different Kitchen. It charted at number 55 in the UK Singles Chart.

== Album title ==
The album's title was inspired by a collage by Linder Sterling. According to Shelley, "Howard said, 'another housewife stews in her own juice in a different kitchen'. We shuffled it around a bit and it came out like that."

=== Album cover ===
The sleeve design is by Malcolm Garrett. The original UK vinyl release was issued with a black cardboard inner sleeve, using a colour photo by Jill Furmanovsky on the front cover where Linder's image was intended to appear. Subsequent pressings substituted a black and white photo. The initial few thousand copies were shipped in a matching silver plastic shopping bag boldly with the word 'PRODUCT' on one side and the catalogue number "UAG 30159" on the other. Displaying the catalogue number prominently in this way was a common feature of Buzzcocks' artwork which was later picked up and taken to logical extremes by Factory Records, where everything they produced was catalogued.

== Release ==
Professional ratings
Review scores
Source	Rating
AllMusic	4/5 stars
Classic Rock	10/10
Mojo	5/5 stars
Q	4/5 stars
Record Collector	4/5 stars
The Rolling Stone Album Guide	4/5 stars
Sounds	5/5 stars
Spin Alternative Record Guide	9/10
Uncut	4/5 stars
Vox	9/10

Rhino Records re-released Another Music in a Different Kitchen in a limited edition of 6,200 copies on 180-gram translucent orange vinyl in 2015 for Black Friday Record Store Day.

== Legacy ==
The album's second track, "No Reply", was covered by SS Decontrol on their 1983 EP Get It Away. The Seattle band the Fastbacks recorded "Whatever Happened To...?" on their 1991 single "My Letters", released by Sub Pop. The track "Autonomy" was covered by the pop punk band the Offspring on the single "Want You Bad".

The Sub Pop act Love Battery were named after the song of that name on this album.

Another Music in a Different Kitchen was included in the book 1001 Albums You Must Hear Before You Die. In a retrospective review for BBC Music, the critic David Quantick named it as his favourite album of all time and wrote, "Everything about it – from its silver, orange-lettered sleeve to Martin Rushent's aluminium-sheen production – is right."

== Track listing ==
Side A
No.	Title	Writer(s)	Length
1.	"Fast Cars"	Howard Devoto, Steve Diggle, Pete Shelley	2:26
2.	"No Reply"	Shelley	2:16
3.	"You Tear Me Up"	Devoto, Shelley	2:27
4.	"Get on Our Own"	Shelley	2:26
5.	"Love Battery"	Devoto, Shelley	2:09
6.	"Sixteen"	Shelley	3:38
Total length:			15:22

Side B
No.	Title	Writer(s)	Length
7.	"I Don't Mind"	Shelley	2:18
8.	"Fiction Romance"	Shelley	4:27
9.	"Autonomy"	Diggle	3:43
10.	"I Need"	Diggle, Shelley	2:43
11.	"Moving Away from the Pulsebeat"	Shelley	7:06
Total length:			20:17 35:39

1996 UK EMI reissue (2nd disc)/2001 US Nettwerk reissue (same disc) bonus tracks - "Orgasm Addict" + "What Do I Get?"
No.	Title	Writer(s)	Length
12.	"Orgasm Addict"	Devoto, Shelley	2:01
13.	"Whatever Happened To?"	Shelley, Alan Dial	2:14
14.	"What Do I Get?"	Shelley	2:50
15.	"Oh Shit"	Shelley	1:32
Total length:			8:37 44:16

Special Edition Bonus Tracks (2008 EMI UK, 2010 EMI/Mute USA) - John Peel Show recorded 7 September 1977, broadcast 19 September 1977
No.	Title	Writer(s)	Length
16.	"Fast Cars"	Shelley, Devoto, Diggle	2:16
17.	"Moving Away from the Pulsebeat"	Shelley	4:45
18.	"What Do I Get?"	Shelley	2:51
Total length:			9:52 54:08

Special Edition Bonus Disc (2008 EMI UK, 2010 EMI/Mute USA) - Demo Recordings and Live at the Electric Circus 2 October 1977
No.	Title	Writer(s)	Length
1.	"Boredom" (Demo)	Shelley, Devoto	3:00
2.	"Fast Cars" (Demo)	Shelley, Devoto, Diggle	2:14
3.	"No Reply" (Demo)	Shelley	2:15
4.	"You Tear Me Up" (Demo)	Shelley, Devoto	2:54
5.	"Get On Our Own" (Demo)	Shelley	2:34
6.	"Sixteen" (Demo)	Shelley	3:10
7.	"I Don't Mind" (Demo)	Shelley	2:26
8.	"Fiction Romance" (Demo)	Shelley	4:07
9.	"Autonomy" (Demo)	Diggle	3:47
10.	"I Need" (Demo)	Shelley, Diggle	2:52
11.	"Orgasm Addict" (Demo)	Shelley, Devoto	2:07
12.	"What Do I Get?" (Demo)	Shelley	2:46
13.	"Whatever Happened To...?" (Demo)	Shelley, Dial	2:20
14.	"Oh Shit" (Demo)	Shelley	1:35
15.	"Fast Cars" (Live at the Electric Circus)	Shelley, Devoto, Diggle	3:03
16.	"Fiction Romance" (Live at the Electric Circus)	Shelley	4:10
17.	"Boredom" (Live at the Electric Circus)	Shelley, Devoto	3:36
18.	"Sixteen" (Live at the Electric Circus)	Shelley	3:16
19.	"You Tear Me Up" (Live at the Electric Circus)	Shelley, Devoto	2:40
20.	"Orgasm Addict" (Live at the Electric Circus)	Shelley, Devoto	2:40
21.	"Moving Away from the Pulsebeat" (Live at the Electric Circus)	Shelley	5:57
22.	"Love Battery" (Live at the Electric Circus)	Shelley, Devoto	3:49
23.	"Time's Up" (Live at the Electric Circus)	Shelley, Devoto	3:16
Total length:			70:34 124:42

== Personnel ==
Buzzcocks

- Pete Shelley – lead guitar, lead vocals
- Steve Diggle – rhythm guitar, backing vocals
- Steve Garvey – bass guitar
- John Maher – drums, backing vocals
- Garth Smith (bass guitar) on Peel Session September 1977, most of the demo recordings and live at the Electric Circus 2 October 1977

Technical

- Martin Rushent – producer
- Doug Bennet – engineer
- Malcolm Garrett – sleeve design
