= Richard Disney (economist) =

Richard Disney (born 17 January 1950) is an economist. He is a Research Fellow at the Institute for Fiscal Studies, a visiting professor in the Department of Economics at University College, London, a Research Associate at the Centre for Economic Performance at the London School of Economics and was a part-time Professor of Economics at the University of Sussex, now Emeritus.

== Career ==
Educated at Queens' College, Cambridge (1968–71) and the University of Sussex (1971–72), he worked in Ethiopia for almost two years in the then-Haile Selassie I University, Addis Ababa, leaving at the time of the overthrow of the Haile Selassie I regime, before returning to an academic career in Britain. Prior to his current posts, his previous academic positions were: Professor of Economics, University of Nottingham (1998–2012), Professor of Economics, Queen Mary College, London (1995–98), Professor of Economics at the University of Kent at Canterbury (1988–1995); Lecturer and then Senior Lecturer at the University of Kent at Canterbury (1977–95), the University of Reading (1975–77), and the University of Strathclyde (1974–75).

== Research ==
Much of his research has focussed on labour market issues, especially in the field of pension reform. In his book Can we afford to grow older: A perspective on the economics of ageing (MIT Press, 1996), he took a relatively optimistic view of the gradual ageing of Western societies, arguing against fashionable views that such societies would inevitably be less productive and face lower living standards. He highlighted that many of the 'stylised facts' of household behaviour in response to ageing could be characterised in the 'life cycle' model of consumer spending, saving, labour supply, skill acquisition and bequests. Nevertheless, he highlighted some of the problems of public choice that arose in trying to curtail excessive public spending on state pensions and the need for reform of health care provision.

His recent work has also examined other issues, including the effect of changes in asset values (especially housing wealth) on consumer behaviour, the pay and pensions of specific public sector groups such as the police, the productivity performance of the United Kingdom economy, and the extent and implications of household indebtedness in the UK. His latest work focuses on crime, policing and housing tenure. This work is published extensively in refereed academic journals but he has also written in national newspapers and, less frequently, appeared in radio and TV broadcasts. He retains a longstanding interest in African economic development issues.

== Policy advisor ==
He was a member of the NHS Pay Review Body from 2003–09, and has been a Member of the Senior Salaries Review Body from 2009–14, which makes recommendations to the government concerning the pay of senior civil servants, judges, the senior military, and other senior public sector staff as requested.

From 2011–12, he was labour market Adviser to Tom Winsor's Independent Review of the Police Officers' Staff Remuneration and Conditions. This was described as the 'most comprehensive review of police officer and staff pay and conditions in over 30 years', many of the recommendations of which have been, or are in the process of being, introduced. He is a member of the Senior Sector Review of police funding within the Home Office, 2016–17. He is also a member of the Fixed Cost Assessors Group examining legal fees, established by the LCJ under the chair of Lord Justice Rupert Jackson in 2017. In February 2018 he was invited to the join the Council of Economic Advisers to the Chancellor of the Exchequer, Philip Hammond MP.

He previously worked as a consultant to the World Bank (including Missions to Turkey and Senegal on pension reform and macroeconomic adjustment), to the International Monetary Fund, to the Organisation for Economic Co-operation and Development, to the International Labour Organization, and to several government departments in the United Kingdom including HM Treasury, the Department for Work and Pensions, and the Department for Business Innovation and Skills. He testified to several Select Committees of the House of Commons and the Lords, to US Senate Hearings on European reform issues, to the EU Parliament, and to the Federal Reserve Board in Washington DC.

== Other activities ==
He has travelled widely, especially in Europe and Africa. Combining his two long-standing interests of music and travel in Africa, he attended the Festival au Désert at Essakane in Mali in 2008. Subsequently, with his wife Professor Erika Szyszczak he has helped support two schools in south west Mali. Along with a number of other friends of then-manager Richard Boon he helped finance the start-up of record label New Hormones and the release of the influential Spiral Scratch by the Buzzcocks.

== Selected publications ==
=== On pension reform ===
- Disney, R. (1996) Can we afford to grow older? A perspective on the economics of ageing, MIT Press: Cambridge MA, ISBN 978-0-26204-157-7.
- Disney, R. and Johnson, P. (2001) Pension systems and retirement incomes across OECD countries, Edward Elgar: Cheltenham. ISBN 978-1-84064-563-7.
- Disney, R. (2004) Are contributions to public pension programmes a tax on employment? Economic Policy, 39, July, 269–311.
- Disney, R., Emmerson, C. and Tetlow, G. (2009) What is a public sector pension worth? Economic Journal (Features) 119 (November), F517-F535, 2009.
- Benitez-Silva, H., Disney, R., and Jimenez-Martin, S.(2010) Disability, capacity for work and the business cycle, Economic Policy, 63, 483–536, 2010(with H. Benitez-Silva and S. Jimenez-Martin).
- Crawford, R. and Disney, R. (2014) Reform of police pensions in England and Wales, Journal of Public Economics, 116, 62–72.

=== On asset prices and household behaviour ===
- Bertola, G., Disney, R. and Grant, C. (eds) (2006) The Economics of Consumer Credit: Lessons from US and European Experience MIT Press, Cambridge, MA. ISBN 978-0-26252-495-7.
- Disney, R., Gathergood, J. and Henley, A. (2010) House price shocks, negative equity and household consumption in the United Kingdom, Journal of the European Economic Association, 8, December 1179 – 1207.
- Disney, R. and Gathergood, J. (2011) House price growth, collateral constraints and the accumulation of homeowner debt in the United States, The B.E. Journal of Macroeconomics: Vol. 11: Issue. 1, 2011 (Contributions), Article 29.
- Disney, R. and Guannan Luo (2017) The right to buy public housing in the United Kingdom: a welfare analysis’. Journal of Housing Economics, 35. pp. 51–68.

=== On productivity ===
- Disney, R.. Heden, Y. and Haskel, J. (2003) Restructuring and productivity change in UK manufacturing, Economic Journal, 113 (July), 666–694.
- Disney, R., Miller, H., and Jin, W. (2013) The productivity puzzles, 53–90, in The IFS Green Budget 2013 (eds C. Emmerson, P. Johnson and H. Miller), Institute for Fiscal Studies, London, 2013.
- Disney, R., Miller, H. and Pope, T. (2020) Heterogeneous firm investment hazards and aggregate investment over the business cycle, Economica, 87, January, 217-248.

=== On policing ===
- Crawford, R. and Disney, R. (2018) Wage regulation and the quality of police officer recruits, Economica, 85, October, 701-734.
- Crawford, R., Disney, R. and Simpson, P. (2020) Financing local police spending in England and Wales: Fiscal federalism in practice, Fiscal Studies, 40, 4, 663-685.
- Disney, R, Gathergood, J., Machin, S. and Sandi, M. (2023) Does homeownership reduce crime? A radical housing reform from the UK, Economic Journal, 131 (October), 2640-2675.
