= Homo sapiens (disambiguation) =

Homo sapiens (Latin: "wise man") is the taxonomic binomial species name for modern humans.

Homo sapiens or Homo Sapiens may also refer to:

== Music ==
- Homo Sapiens (band), an Italian pop-rock band

=== Albums ===
- Homo sapiens, Jorge Ben
- Homo Sapiens (album), 1994 album by Finnish rock group YUP
- Homosapien (album), 1981 album by Pete Shelley

=== Songs ===
- "Homo Sapiens" (song), 2006 song from The Cooper Temple Clause's third album Make This Your Own released in 2007
- "Homosapien" (song), the 1981 title track by Pete Shelley
- Homo Sapien, song from Lenka's 2017 album, Attune.

== Other ==
- Homo Sapiens 1900, 1998 documentary directed by Peter Cohen
- Homo Sapiens (film), 2016 documentary directed by Nikolaus Geyrhalter
- Homo sapiens (novel), 1896 novel about deviance and sexuality, by Stanisław Przybyszewski

== See also ==
- Early modern human
- List of alternative names for the human species
- See Human subspecies for proposed subspecies of Homo sapiens:
  - Homo sapiens idaltu, a proposed subspecies (extinct) related to the modern human subspecies Homo sapiens sapiens
  - Homo sapiens neanderthalensis, an alternative to Homo neanderthalsis that implies Neanderthal man might be a subspecies more closely related to modern humans
  - Homo sapiens rhodesiensis, an alternative nomenclature for Homo rhodesiensis
  - Homo sapiens sapiens, subspecies that precisely represents modern humans, the earliest of whom emerged about 200,000 years ago – the only human subspecies still alive on Earth
- HomerSapien, a variant of the RoboSapien toy modelled after the animated character Homer Simpson.
