= Sky Yen =

Studio album by Pete Shelley
- Released: 24 April 1980
- Recorded: March 1974
- Genres: Electronic; experimental; drone
- Length: 38:33
- Label: Groovy
- Producer: Pete Shelley

Pete Shelley chronology
Sky Yen (1980)	Homosapien (1981)

Sky Yen is the first album recorded by English musician Pete Shelley, recorded in March 1974 and released by his label Groovy Records in April 1980. It is Shelley's earliest known recording, and was created when he was in college. After developing an interest in electronic music, Shelley created a single electronic oscillator with an added potentiometer, and recorded the album on the device in his living room while utilising a two-track stereo recorder. The entirely electronic album is experimental in style, and emphasises oscillations and drone characteristics.

Although recorded in 1974, Sky Yen went unreleased for six years until after Shelley had earned recognition in the punk rock band Buzzcocks. The album surprised fans expecting pop music, and received a hostile reception. More positive critical attention has greeted the record in retrospect, and in December 2011, it was re-released by Drag City as part of a series of reissues of the Groovy Records catalogue.

== Background and production ==
While at college in the early 1970s, Shelley developed an interest in electronics. He purchased magazines containing diagrams of electronic devices readers could create, one of which he later described as "a simple thing where you could get one of those etch resist pens and a sheet of plastic with copper on one side, and you could draw your circuit on this, then put it in an acid bath to dissolve the copper, except for the bits where you'd drawn this thing, and then you could solder your components in, and you ended up with this thing that made a siren noise." Inspired by this, Shelley decided to experiment and create his own oscillator. He added a potentiometer, which he described as an ideal resistor, to the device so he could alter the pitch, and purchased a Tandberg two-track stereo recorder which allowed him to "do sound on sound by bouncing from one track to another." He discovered that, by putting his fingers in the oscillator – which, running on a 9-volt battery, was not deemed a risk – he himself would "become part of the circuit," explaining that the sound would be affected by the sweat on his fingers or "which bits you'd randomly touch", and thus creating unusual tones. He later said: "I became another resistance, and so had a touch-sensitive way of coming up with really weird things."

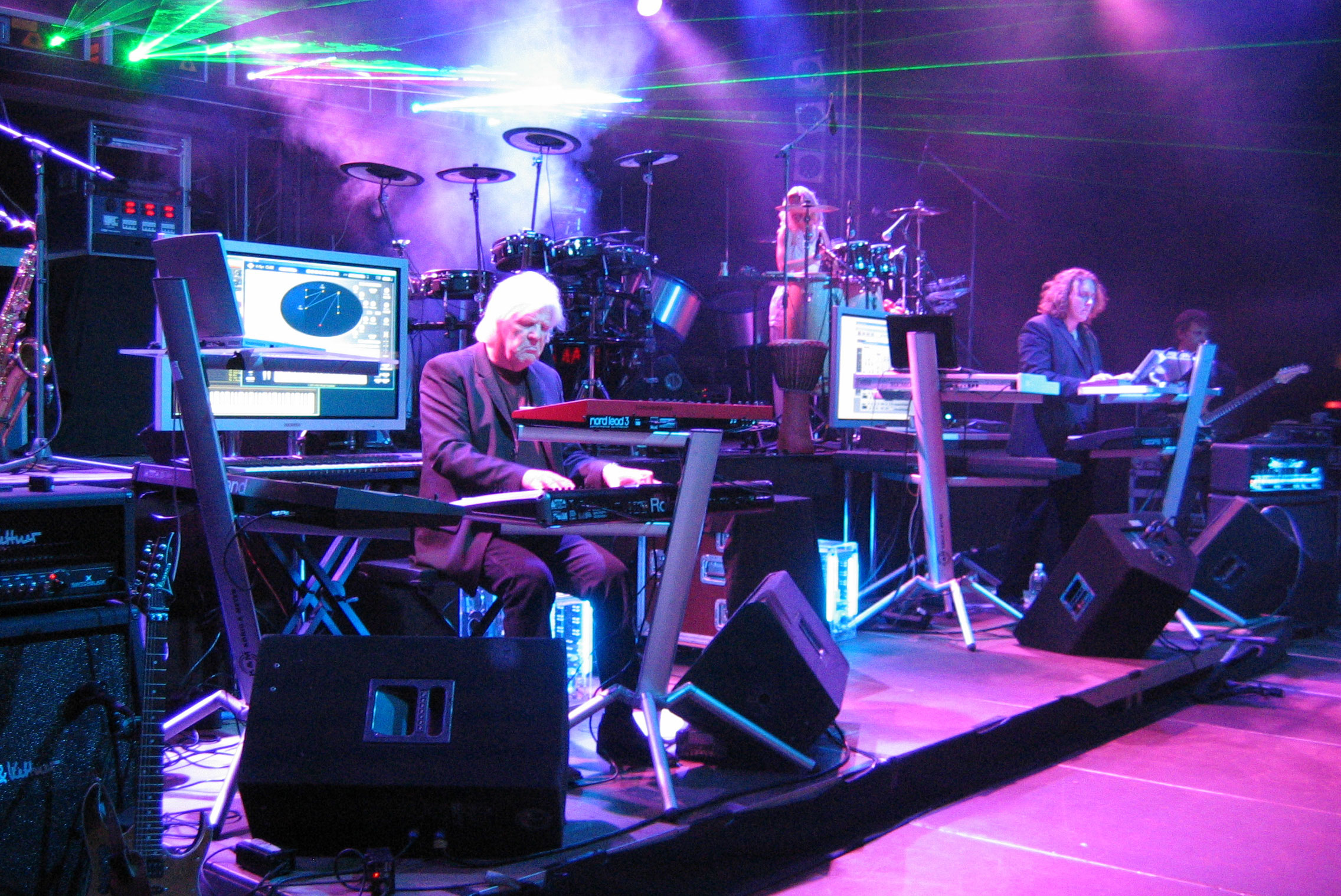
Sky Yen was inspired by German bands like Tangerine Dream (pictured).

Recorded on Shelley's purpose-built oscillator in March 1974, Sky Yen was Shelley's first known recording, and predates his time with punk rock band Buzzcocks, his best known project. The recording took place on a Saturday morning in Shelley's living room, utilising the inventive set-up he discovered with his oscillator; he later explained of the production: "I just wired it all up and started messing about, changing the speed and the pitch, and built up this thing." He subsequently added echo and other effects until he reached the desired effect. Sky Yen exemplifies Shelley's early taste for Germanic electronic music, and was directly influenced by Tangerine Dream and Cluster. Shelley commented: "I used to listen to John Peel, he was always playing a whole side of Phaedra and stuff like that". Writers have also highlighted the influence of krautrock bands like Kraftwerk, Can and Faust, and "shades of John Cage".

== Composition ==
Marking Shelley's first foray into electronica, Sky Yen contains his home-made reel of electronic experiments, conducted on the musician's single oscillator as opposed to fully-fledged electronic instruments. The record features two 20-minute tracks, and is characterised by the usage of drones, oscillations and noise. Trouser Press describe Sky Yen as a primitive, electronic drone album, an opinion echoed by writer Stephen Thomas Erlewine, who also feels the album resembles krautrock. Writer John Kealy nonetheless notes: "It is hard truly pin it down as it never settles into the easy drones that many Kosmische groups often employ." James McMahon of NME describes it as a "deeply experimental sound-collage". The album is fully instrumental, and the oscillations throughout the record are distorted and primitive in style. The music is also aggressive in tone, incorporating tones that feature for "longer than is comfortable", according to Kealy. The first half of Sky Yen features high-pitched waveforms, some of which hold for a lengthy period, forming a "relentless resonant backbone", while the second half was said by Kealy to have "more in common with air raid sirens than music."

== Release and reception ==
In the years after completing Sky Yen, Shelley would listen to it in headphones while lying in the dark and also play it to guests, describing it as "great at clearing parties." However, despite being recorded in 1974, Sky Yen went unreleased until Groovy Records – the label Shelley started with manager Richard Boon in 1979 – issued it on 24 April 1980 as a limited edition. The album's release came after Buzzcocks' control over the production of their music ensured Shelley could launch his own record label. According to Shelley, he would "[play] the tapes just for myself" until, when starting the label, thought, "Why not put this out?" By this point, there were already British and American bands called Sky, and as he "didn't care to make it three," Shelley added "yen" to the proposed Sky name, the idea coming when he noticed he labelled the tapes with "a Japanese Dymo tape marker using the 'yen' symbol."

Released in a sky blue sleeve designed to resemble graph paper, Sky Yen ultimately became the musician's first solo album, and its appearance in 1980 predated Shelley's return to electronic instruments when officially launching his solo career a year later. The record sold out its original run of 1,000 copies but puzzled fans of Buzzcocks. Shelley recalled that, upon release, Sky Yen "sold loads, because people were expecting it to be me singing pop songs and they weren't expecting this noise that came out." In August 1980, Sounds opened their negative review of the album with the words "Poor, Pete Shelley," a reflection of the hostility the album received. Reviewing the album for Smash Hits, Red Starr was baffled by Shelley's decision to record and release "a piece of sheer self indulgence" and further questioned "[w]hy anyone would want to actually buy this double dose of droning unless they had trouble sleeping". He also wrote that the album is neither as strong or as atmospheric as "the recent Durutti Column album" and is solely notable for its collector's value.

== Retrospective reviews and legacy ==
"Consisting solely of shifting oscillator patterns, this is a far cry from the short, choppy punk he is best known for yet is just as engaging as his more famous efforts."

— John Kealy, Brainwashed

Sky Yen has built up acclaim in the years since its release. Ged Babey of Louder Than War felt that Sky Yen was "hugely noncommercial" given Shelley's recognition as a pop lyricist in a punk band, and described it as "in a way his Metal Machine Music." Though he felt the album's "[d]rones, oscillations and whale-noises" would test listeners' patience and "clear the room at any party successfully", he felt the record was "brave, uncompromising and fucked music which was way ahead of its time." John Kealy of Brainwashed wrote that although Sky Yen is "a far cry from the short, choppy punk" Shelley is best known for, it is "just as engaging as his more famous efforts." He felt that the album "cleansed [his ears] in a way rarely achieved by any medical intervention" and felt the album was suitable for "when I need to clear the cobwebs from my mind."

Jedd Beaudoin of PopMatters wrote that the album "sounds like a dentist's drill on an expressway to your skull whilst some sinister someone submerges your hand in ice cold water and a dancing clown appears to do birthday magic tricks for you." He felt Sky Yen was a "real gem for the noise enthusiast," but noted what he felt was the absence of "any true compositions across its two 20-minute tracks." David Sprague of Spin commented that the "self-indulgent" album "sounded more like a mosquito dive-bombing a cheap tube amp than anything else." Stephen Thomas Erlewine of AllMusic called the album "a curiosity for devoted fans, especially since the primitive, droning electronics recall Krautrock, not punk rock." KEXP-FM describe the album as "oscillating madness." Trouser Press highlighted the simplistic production set-up and call the album "a collectors' item of minor interest."

Sam Adams of The A.V. Club contextualised the album's "side-long electronic drones" as exemplifying Shelley's experimental music background, which was later evident in Buzzcocks songs like "I Believe" and "(Moving Away from the) Pulsebeat." Critic Dave Thompson described Shelley's oscillator experiments on the album as "sufficient", and counted the record alongside works by The Future, Cabaret Voltaire and Thomas Leer in that all "were all stepping out in one form or another and looking, too, towards an icy electronic future." Sky Yen was re-released by Drag City on 6 December 2011 as part of the label's reissues of the full Groovy Records catalogue. The album also featured alongside other Groovy albums in Drag City's 2012 box set The Total Groovy.

== Track listing ==
=== Side one ===
1. "Sky Yen Part 1" – 19:02

=== Side two ===
2. "Sky Yen Part 2" – 19:31

== Personnel ==
Adapted from the liner notes of Sky Yen

- Pete Shelley – album cover
- Malcolm Garrett – album cover
- Maxwell Anandappa – plating
