= Willie Trotter =

British musician

Willie Trotter (born 1959, Manchester, England) was an English musician, who, in late 1970s, formed part of the early line-up of post-punk band Ludus, formed by art designer Linder Sterling on vocals, Arthur Kadmon on guitar and Toby Tolman (later of Primal Scream) on drums. He left the band by the time Kadmon quit, being both replaced by Ian Devine.

He was schoolfriend of Magazine bassist and avant-garde musician Barry Adamson, who also played bass with Ludus in some gigs after his departure.
