= Spaceheads =

English band

- Origin: Manchester, England
- Genres: Indie rock; electronic
- Years active: 1989–present
- Labels: Merge Records; Absolutely Kosher Records; Insound Records; These Records; Electric Brass Records; Bip Hop Records; Bop Cassettes
- Members: Andy Diagram; Richard Harrison
- Website: spaceheads.co.uk

Spaceheads are an English band formed in 1989 by musicians Andy Diagram and Richard Harrison in Manchester, England.

== History ==
=== Origins (1980–1989) ===
Andy Diagram and Richard Harrison began playing music together in a band called Dislocation Dance in 1980. When the band eventually folded in 1987, Diagram was already playing with Harrison's band The Mud Hutters, before the two formed a band called The Honkies that same year. The pair launched a cassette under the name Spaceheads in 1989, which marked the beginning of their newest project.

=== Early years (1989–1992) ===
Spaceheads was formed in Manchester, England in early 1989. The band's first concerts took place in smaller venues across the city of Manchester, and released their first studio album in 1990, titled Ho! Fat Wallet, only available on a cassette tape, through a small local label known as Bop Cassettes. The same year, they released Pay Me My Money Down as a twelve-inch EP. Andy Diagram had joined the Mancunian rock band James in 1989, and went on tour with them for the next three years.

=== Further activities and touring (1992–2002) ===
Diagram finally left James in the summer of 1992, and moved to London, with Harrison still living in Manchester. In order to record music, the duo would meet in a studio room in a council flat in Brixton, which allowed them to carry on with the Spaceheads project. The band eventually began touring across Europe and the United States by 1996, and ended up performing at Terrastock in San Francisco in 1998. They released the album Low Pressure in 2002, before taking a break from touring.

=== Break from touring (2002–2012) ===
Spaceheads had been collaborating with double bassist Vincent Bertholet, as well as sound artist Max Eastley since 2000 and often performed under the names The Spaceheads Trio or Spaceheads with Max Eastley. Richard Harrison's son Billy Harrison was born in 2002, and the band took a break from world touring. The band did record two albums with Eastley on Bip Hop Records. They continued to collaborate with Eastley until 2007. It was not until 2013 that Spaceheads would begin to perform regularly once more.

=== Resurgence and Electric Brass Records (2013–present) ===
In 2013, Diagram and Harrison founded their own record label Electric Brass Records, which allowed Spaceheads to release more regularly than in previous decades. The band have embarked on several tours across the United Kingdom since 2013, although not to the scale during their hype in the 1990s. In the 2020s, Harrison's son Billy joined the duo as a touring member on the cello.

== Band members ==
=== Current members ===
- Andy Diagram – trumpet, electronics (1989–present)
- Richard Harrison – drums, percussion (1989–present)
- Billy Harrison – cello (touring; 2025–present)

=== Former session/touring members ===
- Max Eastley – arc (touring; 2000–2007)
- Vincent Bertholet – double bass (touring; 2016)

== Discography ==
=== Studio albums ===
- Ho! Fat Wallet (1990)
- Spaceheads (1995)
- Angel Station (1999)
- The Time of The Ancient Astronaut (2001)
- Low Pressure (2002)
- A Short Ride on the Arrow of Time (2015)
- Laughing Water (2016)
- A New World in our Hearts (2017)
- Time and Spaceheads Box Set (2024)

=== Extended plays ===
- Pay Me My Money Down (1990)
- Sun Radar (2013)
- Trip To The Moon (2014)
- Rust (2022)
- Go Wild (2025)

=== Live and compilation albums ===
- Round The Outside (1997)
- Ho Fat Wallet (1997)
- Live 1999 (1999)
- Compilations (2002)
- Motel Music Machine (2006)
- A Very Long Way From Anywhere Else (2007)
- Bip Hop Generation Vol. 9 (2008)
