= Andy Diagram =

British musician and trumpet player

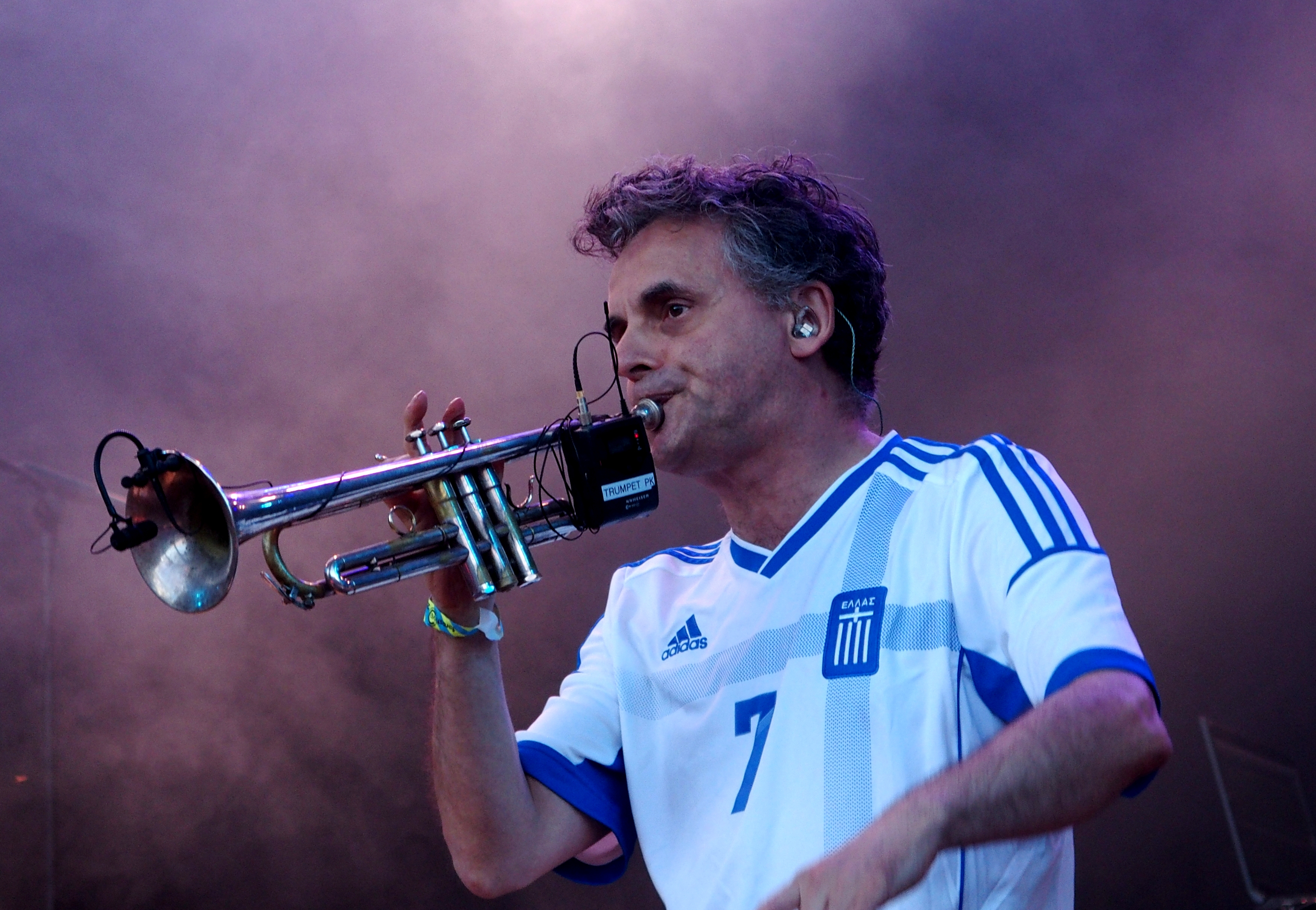
- Andy Diagram performing with James at Delamere Forest, 5 July 2015

Background information
- Born: 1959 (age 66–67); London, UK
- Genres: Alternative rock, experimental rock, nu jazz, electronic
- Occupation: Musician
- Instruments: Trumpet, vocals
- Years active: late 1970s–present
- Member of: James
- Formerly of: David Thomas & Two Pale Boys, Pale Fountains, Spaceheads, Diagram Brothers, Dislocation Dance, The Honkies, Michael Head and the Red Elastic Band

Andy Diagram (born 1959 in London) is a British musician and trumpet player. He has worked with the instrument in a variety of bands and contexts ranging from pop and rock to experimental jazz, art rock and dance music. He is best known for his work with James (having been a member from 1989 to 1992 during the band's popular peak in the UK, and rejoining for the ongoing band re-formation in 2007), with Spaceheads and with the Pere Ubu singer David Thomas.

== Biography ==
Andy Diagram has played the trumpet for more than 35 years. He developed a distinct style over that time in a variety of very different projects. Creating large soundscapes of brass with the use of electronics, looping his trumpet in multiple echo machines, and with use of harmonisers to build pulsating rhythms.

Spending much of the 1980s in Manchester, England, he recorded and toured with a range of bands on the rock, pop and jazz scenes (from Diagram Brothers, Dislocation Dance and Pale Fountains) before joining James in 1989. Andy stayed on for two of the band's most successful albums (Gold Mother and Seven) before leaving James in 1992. (He made a special return for the band's farewell tour in 2001 at the MEN Arena.)

Moving to London in 1992 he became a founder member of The Honkies (Diagram, Richard Harrison, Caroline Kraabel and Kathy Hulme), whose high energy style, reminiscent of post-punk, was married to an experimental approach derived partly from the more adventurous American jazz such as Ornette Coleman, Albert Ayler and the Art Ensemble of Chicago, and had an acknowledged kinship with such bands as The Pop Group and This Heat - which found a certain success/notoriety in the London improvised music scene of the early 1990s. He now records and tours the world with his own, much acclaimed band Spaceheads, where his unique sound and melodic sense are complemented by the emotive rhythms of drummer Richard Harrison. He has also been recording and touring with David Thomas as a regular member of Two Pale Boys for the last ten years.

Following the reunion of James in 2007, Diagram returned to the band during their festival tour in the summer of that year and played on the new album Hey Ma, released on 7 April 2008. He is now a full-time member of the band again, featuring on every live performance from 2008 to 2021 (with odd occasions when only 4 or 5 members attended live appearances), and has featured prominently on their recent albums La Petite Mort, released June 2014, Girl at the End of the World (released March 2016), Living in Extraordinary Times (August 2018), and accompanying the band on their UK and Portugal tour in November 2014, festival tour in 2015, and subsequent tours since.

Diagram performed with Pale Fountains at their 25th anniversary reunion concerts in Liverpool and London on 2 and 3 February 2008 and worked with Michael Head and the Red Elastic Band on their 2017 record, Adios, Señor Pussycat.

He currently lives in London, where he is active on the jazz and improvised music scenes and has taught Music Production at City Lit College.

== Discography (selected) ==
with Diagram Brothers:

- Some Marvels of Modern Science (New Hormones, ORG17, 1981)

with Dislocation Dance:

- Slip That Disc (New Hormones, ORG10, 1981).
- Midnight Shift (Rough Trade, Rough 63, 1983)

with Pale Fountains:

- Pacific Street (Virgin Records V2274, 1983)
- From Across the Kitchen Table (Virgin Records 206 872-270, 1985)

with ‘’’Michael Head and the red elastic band’’’:

- ’’Cadiz’’
- ’’picasso’’

with Yargo:

- Bodybeat (FFFR/London LONP 64, 1987)

with James:

- Gold Mother (Phonogram 846 189-1, 1990)
- Seven (Phonogram 866 495-1, 1992)
- Hey Ma (Mercury, 2008)
- Live in 2008 (Self Released, 2008)
- The Night Before (Mercury, 2010)
- The Morning After (Mercury, 2010)
- La Petite Mort (BMG Chrysalis/Cooking Vinyl, 2014)
- Girl at the End of the World (BMG Chrysalis/Cooking Vinyl, 2016)
- Living In Extraordinary Times (BMG/Infectious Music, 2018)
- Live In Extraordinary Times (NBL ENT, 2020)
- All The Colours Of You (Virgin Music Label and Artist Services, 2021)

with The Honkies:

- All My Screws Fell Out (Megaphone 006, 1992)
- Who Eats? (Megaphone 015, 1993)

with Spaceheads:

- Spaceheads (Dark Beloved Cloud DBC204 or Red Note REDNOTE3 1995).
- Round the Outside (Space Records SPACE01, 1997).
- Ho! Fat Wallet (Dark Beloved Cloud DBC212, US, 1998).
- Angel Station (Pandemonium PAN032 or Merge Records MRG157 1999).
- The Time of the Ancient Astronaut (Bip Hop BLEEP 04 2001).
- Low Pressure (Bip Hop BLEEP14 or Merge Records MRG183 2003).
- A Very Long Way from Anywhere Else (Bip Hop BLEEP35 2007).
- Pay Me My Money Down (Big Biz Niz Records, 1990)
- Spaceheads/Monochrome (3) Fast Faenza/Air (Pop Art Records, 2002)
- Sun Radar EP (Electric Brass Records, 2013)
- Trip to the Moon EP (Electric Brass Records, 2014)
- A Short Ride on the Arrow of Time (Electric Brass Records, 2015)
- Laughing Water (Electric Brass Records, 2016)
- A New World in Our Hearts (Electric Brass Records, 2017)

with David Thomas and Two Pale Boys:

- Surfs Up! (Gliterhouse GRCD519, 2000)
- 18 Monkeys on a Dead Mans Chest (Smog Veil, SV51CD 2004)
