= What Do I Get? =

1978 song performed by Buzzcocks

Single by Buzzcocks
- B-side: "Oh Shit"
- Released: 3 February 1978
- Recorded: September 1977; T.W. Studios, Fulham, London
- Genre: Pop-punk; punk rock; power pop; new wave
- Length: 2:50
- Label: United Artists
- Songwriter(s): Pete Shelley
- Producer(s): Martin Rushent

Buzzcocks singles chronology
"Orgasm Addict" (1977)	"What Do I Get?" (1978)	"I Don't Mind" (1978)

"What Do I Get?'" is a single by punk rock band Buzzcocks and its B-side is "Oh Shit". It provided Buzzcocks with their UK chart debut, peaking at number 37 on the UK Singles Chart.

It makes an appearance in the video game Guitar Hero: Warriors of Rock and the movie Ghost World.

== Track listing ==
1. "What Do I Get?" (Shelley) [2:50]
2. "Oh Shit!" (Shelley) [1:32]
