= Love Bites (album) =

Studio album by Buzzcocks
- Released: 22 September 1978
- Recorded: 29 July 1978 – 6 August 1978
- Studios: Olympic, London
- Genres: Punk rock; pop punk; new wave
- Length: 38:42 (original), 48:39 (reissue)
- Label: United Artists
- Producer: Martin Rushent

Buzzcocks chronology
Another Music in a Different Kitchen (1978)	Love Bites (1978)	Singles Going Steady (1979)

Singles from Love Bites
- 1. "Ever Fallen in Love (With Someone You Shouldn't've)" Released: September 8, 1978

Love Bites is the second studio album by English punk rock band Buzzcocks. It was released on 22 September 1978, through United Artists Records.

The album peaked at number 13 on the UK Albums Chart at the time of its release, making Love Bites their highest-charting album.

== Background and production ==
Love Bites was recorded and mixed by Buzzcocks with producer Martin Rushent over a two-and-a-half-week period in July and August 1978, less than six months after the release of their debut album, Another Music in a Different Kitchen. The album was recorded in the midst of an extensive touring schedule.

The instrumental track "Late for the Train" was first played and recorded on John Peel's Radio One show, along with bass player Steve Garvey's instrumental "Walking Distance".

Co-writing credits for "Just Lust" were given to Alan Dial, a pen-name for Buzzcocks' then manager Richard Boon.

"Nostalgia" was also recorded by Penetration, who in 1978 accompanied Buzzcocks on the "Entertaining Friends" tour of England.

== Cover artwork ==
The hand-drawn script on the album sleeve is a conscious reference to paintings by Belgian surrealist artist René Magritte. (Note: René Magritte is believed to be Buzzcocks drummer John Maher's favourite artist.) The sleeve insert airbrush illustrations of the band are by Robin Utracik, rhythm guitarist from the Worst.

== Critical reception ==
Professional ratings
Review scores
Source	Rating
AllMusic	4/5 stars
Classic Rock	8/10
Mojo	3/5 stars
Q	5/5 stars
Record Collector	5/5 stars
The Rolling Stone Album Guide	4/5 stars
Spin Alternative Record Guide	8/10
Uncut	9/10
Vox	7/10

Trouser Press wrote that the record "demonstrates both the Buzzcocks' perfection of their particular brand of pop and their disillusionment with its restrictions. Producer Martin Rushent clarifies the elements of the sound even further, and Shelley's songwriting continues to improve".

In a retrospective review, BBC Music described it as "an essential purchase for anyone remotely interested in punk's history." AllMusic wrote: "More musically accomplished, more obsessively self-questioning, and with equally energetic yet sometimes gloomy performances, Love Bites finds the Buzzcocks coming into their own."

== CD release ==
In March 1994, a CD version of the original album was released by EMI, containing four additional tracks: "Love You More"; "Noise Annoys"; "Promises"; and "Lipstick".

== Track listing ==
All tracks are written by Pete Shelley, except where noted.

Side One
No.	Title	Writer(s)	Length
1.	"Real World"		3:29
2.	"Ever Fallen in Love (With Someone You Shouldn't've)"		2:40
3.	"Operator's Manual"		3:30
4.	"Nostalgia"		2:51
5.	"Just Lust"	Shelley, Alan Dial	2:57
6.	"Sixteen Again"		3:14
Total length:			18:41

Side Two
No.	Title	Writer(s)	Length
1.	"Walking Distance"	Steve Garvey	1:58
2.	"Love Is Lies"	Steve Diggle	3:10
3.	"Nothing Left"		4:23
4.	"E. S. P."		4:39
5.	"Late for the Train"	Shelley, Diggle, John Maher, Garvey	5:51
Total length:			20:01 38:42

Re-issue bonus tracks: "Twice Bitten"
No.	Title	Writer(s)	Length
12.	"Love You More"		1:51
13.	"Noise Annoys"		2:52
14.	"Promises"	Shelley, Diggle	2:36
15.	"Lipstick"	Shelley, Diggle	2:38
Total length:			9:57 48:39

== Personnel ==
Buzzcocks

- Pete Shelley – lead guitar, lead vocals (all but 8)
- Steve Diggle – rhythm and acoustic guitars, backing and lead (8) vocals
- Steve Garvey – bass guitar
- John Maher – drums

Production

- Martin Rushent – production, mixing
- Douglas Bennett – engineering
