= XL1 =

Studio album by Pete Shelley
- Released: May 1983
- Recorded: 1983
- Studio: Genetic, London
- Genre: New wave
- Length: 41:28; 44:55 (with ZX Spectrum information locked groove)
- Label: Genetic/Island
- Producer: Martin Rushent, Pete Shelley

Pete Shelley chronology
Homosapien (1981)	XL1 (1983)	Heaven and the Sea (1986)

Professional ratings
Review scores
Source	Rating
AllMusic	3/5 stars

XL1 is the second solo album by Buzzcocks frontman Pete Shelley. It was released in 1983 and reached number 42 in the UK Albums Chart, remaining in that listing for four weeks. The single "Telephone Operator" charted at No. 66 in the UK Singles Chart, making it his biggest single release there. The original release was packaged with a computer program for the ZX Spectrum which displayed lyrics and graphics in time with the music. The computer program was written in a mixture of BASIC and Assembly and is widely considered to be one of the first multimedia albums ever released.

XL1 had a different running order in the US and contained an edited version of "Many a Time". The original UK album was reissued on CD by Grapevine in 1999 and by Western Songs in 2006, both including two B-side "dub" mixes as bonus tracks.

== Track listing ==
All tracks composed by Pete Shelley.

=== UK version ===
Side one

1. "Telephone Operator" – 3:14
2. "If You Ask Me (I Won't Say No)" – 4:20
3. "What Was Heaven?" – 5:04
4. "You Know Better Than I Know" – 5:04
5. "Twilight" – 3:08

Side two

1. "(Millions of People) No One Like You" – 4:07
2. "Many a Time" – 6:41
3. "I Just Wanna Touch" – 3:04
4. "You & I" – 3:00
5. "XL1" – 3:27
6. Z X Spectrum Code

1999/2006 CD bonus tracks

11. "Telephone Operator/Many a Time (Dub)" – 13:13
12. "If You Ask Me/No One Like You (Dub)" – 5:46

=== UK XL1 + Dub Mix Album cassette ===
Side one

1. "Telephone Operator" – 3:14
2. "If You Ask Me (I Won't Say No)" – 4:20
3. "What Was Heaven?" – 5:04
4. "You Know Better Than I Know" – 5:04
5. "Twilight" – 3:08
6. "(Millions of People) No One Like You" – 4:07
7. "Many a Time" – 6:41
8. "I Just Wanna Touch" – 3:04
9. "You and I" – 3:00
10. "XL1" – 3:27

Side two (dub mixes)

1. "Homosapien (Dub)"
2. "I Don't Know What It Is / Witness The Change (Dub)"
3. "Telephone Operator / Many a Time (Dub)"
4. "If You Ask Me (I Won't Say No) / No One Like You (Dub)"
5. Z X Spectrum Code

=== US version ===
Side one

1. "Telephone Operator" – 3:15
2. "Many a Time" – 4:18
3. "I Just Wanna Touch" – 2:54
4. "You Know Better Than I Know" – 4:48
5. "XL1" – 3:25

Side two

1. "(Millions of People) No One Like You" – 4:05
2. "If You Ask Me (I Won't Say No)" – 4:20
3. "You and I" – 3:01
4. "What Was Heaven?" – 5:05
5. "Twilight" – 3:12

== Personnel ==
Musicians

- Pete Shelley
- Barry Adamson
- Jim Russell
- Martin Rushent

Technical

- Martin Rushent – co-producer
- Pete Shelley – co-producer
- Joey – computer visuals
- Mike Prior – photography
- Bruno Tilley – cover

== Charts ==
Chart (1983)	Peak position
Australia (Kent Music Report)	55
