= Orgasm Addict =

Single by Buzzcocks
- B-side: "Whatever Happened To...?"
- Released: 4 November 1977
- Recorded: September 1977 at T.W. Studios, Manchester, England
- Genre: Punk rock
- Length: 2:02
- Label: New Hormones
- Songwriters: Pete Shelley, Howard Devoto
- Producer: Martin Hannett

Buzzcocks singles chronology
"Orgasm Addict" (1977)	"What Do I Get?" (1978)

"Orgasm Addict" is a song by the English punk rock band Buzzcocks. It was the A-side of the Buzzcocks' first single, with "What Ever Happened To?" as the B-side, which was released on 4 November 1977 by record label New Hormones .

== Cover image ==
The sleeve was devised by graphic designer Malcolm Garrett and showed a collage, created by Linder Sterling (known as "Linder"), depicting a nude woman with smiling mouths instead of nipples, and whose head is a clothes iron. Linder has said "When I die, I'll tell my son that he can finally show the world the source image, because once you see it, you can't get it out of your head."

== Release ==
"Orgasm Addict" was released as the Buzzcocks' debut single on 4 November 1977.

The 7" French vinyl release contains different takes of the same two tracks.

This was the only Buzzcocks single featuring bassist Garth Smith, who joined in early 1977 to replace Steve Diggle, who switched to guitar. Shortly after its release, he was expelled from the band.

The song later appeared on the album Singles Going Steady and also on CD reissues of Another Music in a Different Kitchen.

== Reception ==
The song was controversial due to its sexual content and was banned by the BBC.

Buzzcocks singer Pete Shelley later said that the song "is embarrassing. It's the only one I listen to and... shudder".

== Track listing ==
1. "Orgasm Addict" (Howard Devoto, Pete Shelley) (1:58)
2. "Whatever Happened To?" (Pete Shelley, Dial – alias of ex-manager Richard Boon) (2:07)

== Personnel ==
Buzzcocks

- Pete Shelley– guitar, vocals
- Steve Diggle – rhythm guitar, backing vocals
- Garth Smith – bass, backing vocals
- John Maher – drums

Production

- Martin Rushent – producer
- Alan Winstanley – engineer
- Linder (Linda Sterling) – art collage
- Kevin Cummins – photo
