= Garth Smith =

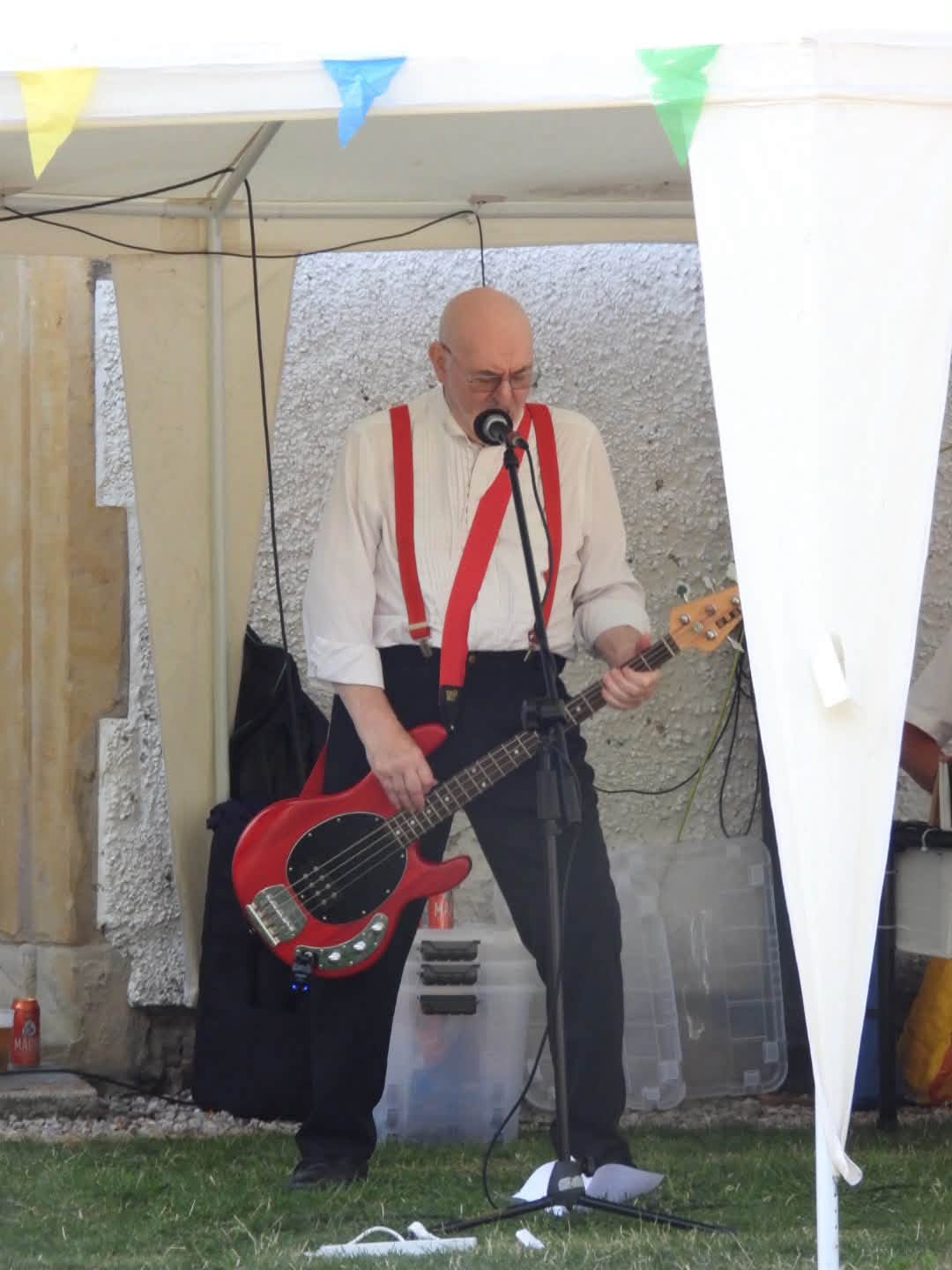
- Garth at 70 years old, performing with Young Once in August 2026

Background information
- Born: Garth Davies; 10 December 1955 (age 70); Tyldesley, Lancashire, England
- Genres: Punk rock, rock, pop
- Occupation: Musician
- Instruments: Bass guitar, double bass
- Years active: 1976–present

Garth Smith (born Garth Davies, 10 December 1955), sometimes credited as Garth, is an English musician, known as the original bassist of the Manchester-formed punk rock band Buzzcocks.

Smith played with Buzzcocks during their first concert in April 1976, and re-joined in March 1977 after the departure of original lead vocalist Howard Devoto. Smith played on the "Orgasm Addict" single before being fired in October 1977. He has since played in some other bands.

== Biography ==
Garth was born in the Lancashire town of Tyldesley on Saturday 10 December 1955. He was named after the village of Garth in mid Wales, near to the town of Builth Wells where his mother was born and raised.

Smith was the original bassist of the band, playing in their first show in the Bolton Institute of Technology, where the other founders of the band, guitarist Pete Shelley and vocalist Howard Devoto, were students, on 1 April 1976.

He rejoined the band after Devoto left and Shelley took the lead vocalist role, around March 1977, when the band played gigs again. The band recorded and released some material with him, such as The Roxy London WC2 (June 1977), a various artists compilation album of bands who played live at The Roxy; Buzzcocks live at the Roxy album recorded in April 1977, and plays on "Time's Up" on "Short Circuit: Live at the Electric Circus" the album that featured the first Joy Division live recording. He also took part in the first Peel sessions, did the White Riot Tour and recorded both songs on the "Orgasm Addict" single. On 8 October 1977, he was expelled from the band, due to his alcoholism after Buzzcocks had performed at Mr. George's in Coventry.

He moved to New York City, and by 1980 he joined Dirty Looks. During the late 1980s, Smith played bass for the Manchester-based band Temper Temper, fronted by David Aldred. Smith played bass on their debut album, History of England. In 1988, he sent a condolence card to Pete Shelley's mother, Margaret, on the death of Pete's father, John, whom Garth thought to be a great man.

Between the late 1980s and the 2010s, little of his whereabouts are known. By the late 2010s, Garth was playing bass in a Tyldesley-based band, Young Once, with Tony Wragg and Pete "Hoddy" Hodkinson.

He is also a member of the Lancashire supergroup Moondogs, comprising lead vocalist Steve Roden, drummer Chris Webster of Crayven, Tony Wragg, Chris Ratcliffe of the Covertones, and "musician without portfolio" on sax, keyboards, guitar and vocals. Garth plays double bass with this 1950s good-time band.

As of 2017, he supports Tyldesley Rugby Union Club and Wigan Athletic F.C.
