= The Seduction (album) =

Studio album by Ludus
- Released: 1981
- Studio: Cargo Studios, Revolution Studios
- Genre: Post-punk
- Label: New Hormones

The Seduction is the first full-length album by English post-punk band Ludus, released in 1981 by record label New Hormones.

== Content ==
The album, considered by many to be the band's masterpiece, contains some of their most accessible and melodic songs (such as "Mirror Mirror", "The Escape Artist" and "See the Keyhole"), as well as some of their most adventurous work (such as the 10 minute improvisational instrumental "The Dynasty"). In keeping with the band's penchant for experimentation and unusual song structures, the album's key track, "Herstory", practically consists of variations on 4 different songs (including track 5 of this album, "Inheritance", and two previously released songs, "Mutilate" and "Mother's Hour"), sliding effortlessly one into another. The album also contains an extended, 6-minute version of the previous single, "My Cherry Is in Sherry".

== Release ==
The Seduction was originally released as a double EP on 12" vinyl by New Hormones in 1982. The album has been released along with the band's debut EP The Visit as the compilation The Visit/The Seduction, on the label Les Temps Modernes.

== Reception ==
AllMusic called the album "the band's career high point".

In a feature for The Quietus, Brian DeGraw of Gang Gang Dance listed the album among his favourites.

== Track listing ==
1. "Unveiled (A Woman's Travelogue)"
2. "My Cherry Is in Sherry"
3. "See the Keyhole"
4. "Herstory"
5. "Inheritance"
6. "The Dynasty"
7. "Mirror Mirror"
8. "The Escape Artist"
