= Heaven and the Sea =

Studio album by Pete Shelley
- Released: 1986
- Recorded: September 1985 – May 1986
- Genre: Pop, pop punk, dance, pop rock
- Label: Mercury
- Producer: Stephen Hague

Pete Shelley chronology
XL1 (1983)	Heaven and the Sea (1986)	Buzzkunst (2002)

Heaven and the Sea is an album by the English musician Pete Shelley, released in 1986. He supported it by opening for the Bangles on a North American tour as well as playing solo shows. "Waiting for Love" was the first single.

== Production ==
The album was produced by Stephen Hague. Shelley wrote all of its songs, which he recorded between September 1985 and May 1986, using a Boston studio belonging to the Cars for much of the work. He recorded for so long and with so many musicians that he elected to forgo credits. Shelley wanted to combine pop hooks with depressing lyrics on many of the songs.

== Critical reception ==
Professional ratings
Review scores
Source	Rating
All Music Guide to Rock	3/5 stars
Alternative Rock	5/10
The Great Indie Discography	6/10
Record-Journal	A−
The Sault Star	3/5
Uncut	7/10

The Chicago Tribune called the album "potent Brit Pop", stating that Shelley displays "less Buzzcock bite and an increasing amount of romantic melodicism." The Kingston Whig-Standard noted the "mildly energetic vocals churning out synth dance numbers". The Chicago Sun-Times panned the production by Hague.

The News & Daily Advance said that the album "continues his tradition of synthesized pop punk and catchy tunes." The Calgary Herald dismissed Heaven and the Sea as "a pleasant but pointless diversion". The Edmonton Journal said that Shelley had "beef[ed] up his minimalist disco". In 2025, Uncut labeled it "slick pop-rock".

== Track listing ==
No.	Title	Length
1.	"Waiting for Love"
2.	"On Your Own"
3.	"They're Coming for You"
4.	"I Surrender"
5.	"Life Without Reason"
6.	"Need a Minit"
7.	"Never Again"
8.	"My Dreams"
9.	"Blue Eyes"
10.	"You Can't Take That Away"
11.	"No Moon..."
