= Spiral Scratch =

EP by Buzzcocks
- Released: 28 January 1977
- Recorded: 28 December 1976
- Studio: Indigo Sound (Manchester)
- Genre: Punk rock
- Length: 10:01
- Label: New Hormones
- Producer: Martin Hannett

Buzzcocks chronology
Spiral Scratch (1977)	Another Music in a Different Kitchen (1978)

Professional ratings
Review scores
Source	Rating
AllMusic	4.5/5 stars
Entertainment Weekly	B
Mojo	5/5 stars
Pitchfork	9.5/10
Q	5/5 stars
The Rolling Stone Album Guide	4/5 stars
Spin Alternative Record Guide	9/10
Uncut	5/5 stars

Spiral Scratch is the debut EP by the English punk rock band Buzzcocks, released on 28 January 1977 through New Hormones. Spiral Scratch and the album Time's Up are the only Buzzcocks studio releases with original singer Howard Devoto, who left shortly after to form the post-punk band Magazine.

When reissued in 1979, it reached number 31 in the UK singles chart. In 2017, it was at the top of the UK Physical Singles Chart after being re-issued on its 40th anniversary. Spiral Scratch has been cited as instrumental in the development of indie rock and the wider English independent music scene.

== Recording and release ==
Buzzcocks recorded the tracks on 28 December 1976 at Dave Kent-Watson's Indigo Sound Studios in Manchester on 16-track Ampex tape. According to Devoto, "It took three hours [to record the tracks], with another two for mixing." Produced by Martin Hannett (credited as "Martin Zero"), the music was roughly recorded, insistently repetitive and energetic.

The band, having no record label support, had to borrow about £750 from their friends and families to pay for the record's production and manufacture. The EP was released on 28 January 1977 on the band's own New Hormones label, making Buzzcocks the first English punk group to establish an independent record label. Despite this, the disc quickly sold out its initial run of 1,000 copies, and went on to sell 16,000 copies, initially by mail order, but also with the help of the Manchester branch of the music chain store Virgin, whose manager took some copies and persuaded other regional branch managers to follow suit.

== "Boredom" ==
"Boredom", probably the EP's most well-known song, announced punk's rebellion against the status quo while templating a strident musical minimalism (the guitar solo consisting of two notes repeated 66 times, ending with a single modulated seventh). At the same time, the lyrics already showed boredom with the movement itself ("You know the scene is very humdrum" and "I'm already a has-been!") Indeed, Devoto left the band on the eve of the record's release, saying, "I get bored very easily, and that boredom can act as a catalyst for me to suddenly conceive and execute a new vocation." He added that punk rock had already become restrictive and stereotyped. Richard Boon, the band's manager, says that "Boredom" was a satirical song.

== Release ==
Simon Reynolds, in his book Rip It Up and Start Again, writes that some consider Spiral Scratch to be a more important record than the Sex Pistols' "Anarchy in the U.K." because, whereas the Sex Pistols' single showed that anyone could be in a rock band (a novel idea at the time), Spiral Scratch proved that anyone could release a record without needing an established record label. Reynolds also contends that the EP was "a regionalist blow" by the Manchester band against the London-based music industry. Jon Savage says that it was instrumental in helping to establish the small labels and scenes in both Manchester and Liverpool.

It is often said that the many small DIY labels that sprang up across the UK in 1977 took Spiral Scratch as their inspiration.

The EP was also an exercise in the demystification of the record-making process (for example, its title was taken from the music's being recorded literally as a spiral scratch on each side of the vinyl; also, the listing of take numbers and overdubs on the record sleeve). This was a landmark event for many, Reynolds adds. "People were buying Spiral Scratch [...] for the sheer fact of its existence, its existence as a cultural landmark and portent of revolution."

Bob Last founded the Fast Product record label after Spiral Scratch came out. "I had absolutely no idea there'd been a history of independent labels before that. Spiral Scratch turned my head around."

== Legacy ==
"Boredom" was placed at number 11 in Mojo magazine's list of "100 Punk Scorchers" in 2001.

The 1980s indie band Orange Juice mentioned "Boredom", used a line from it and adapted the guitar solo on their 1982 single "Rip It Up".

The self-publication of Spiral Scratch is cited as an event which led to the rise of independent record labels and ultimately resulted in the name "indie" being used to describe a style of music as well as a publishing model.

"Boredom" was featured in the 2021 movie Ghostbusters Afterlife.

== Reissues and alternative versions ==
The EP was reissued in the United Kingdom in 1979, having been deleted when Buzzcocks signed to United Artists in 1977. Remaining on the New Hormones label, but credited to "Buzzcocks with Howard Devoto", the record was distributed by Virgin Records and reached number 31 in the charts, staying in for six weeks. As a consequence of Buzzcocks' signing to UA, and later EMI, none of the tracks on Spiral Scratch appeared on subsequent EMI compilation albums Singles Going Steady, Product or Operator's Manual: Buzzcocks Best.

The EP was reissued as a CD by Mute Records in 1999. The original EP was priced at £40 by Record Collector in its 2008 price guide.

In 2017, Spiral Scratch was reissued on vinyl by Domino Records to commemorate its 40th anniversary. On the week of 3 February the EP entered the top spot on the UK physical singles chart.

== Track listing ==
All songs written by Howard Devoto and Pete Shelley.

Side One
No.	Title	Length
1.	"Breakdown"	1:54
2.	"Time's Up"	3:02
Total length:		4:56

Side Two
No.	Title	Length
1.	"Boredom"	2:52
2.	"Friends of Mine"	2:13
Total length:		5:05 10:01

== Personnel ==
Personnel taken from Spiral Scratch liner notes, and Sound on Sound.

Buzzcocks

- Howard Devoto – vocals
- Pete Shelley – guitar, vocals on "Boredom"
- Steve Diggle – bass
- John Maher – drums

Technical

- Martin Hannett – production
- Phil Hampson – engineering, mixing
- Richard Boon – polaroid picture

== See also ==
- DIY ethic
- Self-publishing
- Music of Manchester
