= Richard Boon =

British post-punk librarian

James Richard Boon
- Origin: Leeds
- Labels: New Hormones

James Richard Boon (born 6 July 1953) is the former manager of Buzzcocks and boss of the record label, New Hormones.

Boon, a Leeds Grammar School friend of Howard Devoto, became the manager for seminal punk group Buzzcocks by default, after organising gigs for the band. Boon participated on the writing of several Buzzcocks songs, using the pen name Alan Dial. Seeking to release the band's music, Boon, Devoto and Pete Shelley started the New Hormones label. The label released the Spiral Scratch EP in January 1977, and began releasing records by other artists regularly from 1979 to 1982. During this time acts such as Biting Tongues, Diagram Brothers, Dislocation Dance, Ludus and Eric Random all released early records with the Manchester-based label.

Richard Boon went on to work for Rough Trade Records, and later became a librarian at Stoke Newington Library, Hackney, London, where he facilitated a monthly reading group on the second Tuesday of each month.

On his birthday, 6 July 1983 The Smiths appeared live at The Haçienda, Manchester, and Morrissey dedicated the song "I Don't Owe You Anything" to Boon.

Boon contributed a regular column to the Stoke Newington free quarterly community magazine N16, and is part of the crew at the annual Stoke Newington Literary Festival, held first weekend of June

Married to retired BBC Radio Science Editor, Deborah Cohen MBE, with whom he is the father of Museum Curator Rachel Boon and chef Adam Boon.
