= Homosapien (album) =

Studio album by Pete Shelley
- Released: October 1981 (U.S.)
- Recorded: February–August 1981
- Studio: Genetic Sound (Berkshire, England)
- Genre: New wave, synthpop, post-punk
- Length: 35:51
- Label: Genetic/Island (UK & Europe); Arista (U.S. & Canada)
- Producer: Martin Rushent, Pete Shelley

Pete Shelley chronology
Sky Yen (1980)	Homosapien (1981)	XL1 (1983)

Singles from Homosapien
- 1. "Homosapien" Released: September 1981; 2. "I Don't Know What It Is" Released: 13 November 1981

Homosapien is the second solo album by British musician Pete Shelley, released in 1981 by Arista Records in the U.S. and Genetic/Island Records in the UK. The album follows his experimental instrumental album Sky Yen (recorded in 1974 but released in 1980) and his work with the group Buzzcocks, who initially disbanded in 1981. Homosapien saw a marked departure from the punk stylings of Buzzcocks' records, being heavily influenced by the programmed synthesizer sounds and drum machines of synthpop, with the addition of Shelley on acoustic guitar. The title track was released as a UK single and was banned by the BBC due to "explicit" homosexual references, but was nevertheless a hit in several other countries.

== Background ==
Homosapien grew out of rehearsals for Buzzcocks' fourth album, helmed by producer Martin Rushent. After experiencing a difficult year in 1980, Buzzcocks convened at Manchester's Pluto Studios early in 1981 to start work on the album. The majority of the songs that Shelley brought into these sessions had been written between 1973–75, before he had formed Buzzcocks and when he was still in his late teens. The title track, "Love in Vain", "Maxine", "Pusher Man" and "In Love With Somebody Else" had all originated with his 1974 band Jets of Air.

Ultimately, the Buzzcocks' new sessions proved to be unsuccessful, exacerbated by EMI's refusal to pay an advance for the recordings, which put further strain on the band's already difficult financial situation. Seeing the tensions within the band and sensing that Shelley was in need of a break, Rushent halted the sessions on 9 February and suggested to Shelley that the two of them should decamp to Rushent's newly built Genetic Sound studio at his home in Streatley, Berkshire to work on new material.

== Recording ==
Shelley and Rushent began recording tracks on 13 February. In addition to Shelley's 12-string guitar, the duo made use of Rushent's new technologically advanced studio equipment, namely a Fairlight CMI, module banks and analogue synthesisers, including a Roland Microcomposer. All rhythms and basslines were programmed.

In November 1981, Shelley told the NME, "We came here [to Genetic Sound] in February to record demos but as we started to do them they sounded more and more finished, so we nudged them in that direction and within a few months we'd come up with three finished tracks. Just me and Martin in the studio with all the machines."

Shelley subsequently left Buzzcocks in March 1981, via a letter from his lawyer sent to the other members of the group. The band's label, Liberty Records, opted not to sign Shelley as a solo artist, so Rushent—Shelley's new manager—contacted former United Artists A&R executive Andrew Lauder, who had originally signed Buzzcocks to UA in 1977. Impressed with the quality of the demos and requesting more, Lauder subsequently offered Shelley a solo contract with his new label, Island Records. In addition to the older compositions, "Witness the Change" and "I Don't Know What It Is" were newly composed for the album. The sessions for Homosapien spanned over six or seven months.

Speaking with Sounds in January 1982, Shelley stated that he left Buzzcocks in order to circumvent the problems he'd had with them, particularly with regards to his inability to effectively communicate his ideas, and that he'd had difficulty envisioning himself ever performing these new songs with the band. Following the release of Homosapien, Buzzcocks would not release any new material for 14 years and would not reform until 1989.

== Release and promotion ==
The title track was released as the album's first single on 11 September 1981. In the UK, the BBC banned the song, alleging that the lyric "homosuperior, in my interior" was an explicit reference to gay sex. It reached the top ten in Canada and Australia, and fell just outside of it in New Zealand. The song charted on the U.S. Billboard Dance Club Songs chart for 17 weeks, peaking at No. 14.

Due to contractual issues in the UK, the Homosapien album was first released in the U.S., in October 1981. The American version had a different track listing, replacing "Pusher Man", "It's Hard Enough Knowing" and "Keats' Song" with "Love in Vain", "Witness the Change" and "In Love with Somebody Else". The album was promoted there with college radio airplay and several concert dates from Shelley. That same month, "I Don't Know What It Is" was issued as the album's second single, peaking at No. 12 on the Dance Club Songs chart.

The cover of the album was fashioned in a modernist style, featuring Shelley sitting in a makeshift "office" amongst a Commodore PET computer, a statue of the Egyptian god Anubis, a pyramid, a red telephone, a telescope and a phrenologist's skull. Shelley wears a white suit with a green carnation in the lapel, a symbol for homosexuality originated by Oscar Wilde.

Originally scheduled for UK release on 28 August and then again on 16 November 1981, Homosapien finally received a UK release on 15 January 1982. A third single, "Witness the Change", peaked at No. 63 on the U.S. Dance Club Songs chart in May of 1982. That same month, the title track was reissued with a different B-side. The U.S. version of the album made its debut on the Billboard 200 on 26 June 1982 and peaked at No. 121 on 31 July, spending ten weeks on the charts.

The U.S. version of Homosapien was issued on compact disc on 21 January 1997 by Razor & Tie, with five bonus tracks taken from Shelley's follow-up album, XL1 (1983). A different edition with bonus tracks was issued by V.A.R. on 21 March 2006. On 6 June 2025, expanded editions of both Homosapien and XL1 were released by Domino Recording Company.

== Critical reception ==
Professional ratings
Review scores
Source	Rating
AllMusic	4.5/5 stars
Q	3/5 stars
Rolling Stone	4/5 stars
Smash Hits	7/10
The Village Voice	B+

Gavin Martin of NME said that "Homosapien is the first chance to examine the solo Shelley over the full range of interests and emotions but it is a disjointed album... the problem is the bulk of the raw material is too ineffectual, often embarrassing and half realised, to give the songs a focal point which binds, injects or drives them with the necessary conviction or resolution... It lacks energy, urgency and desperation, something to grab on to: the power to wake you or make you or shake you up. A shame because Shelley still has a lot to give." Adam Sweeting of Melody Maker opined that by "leaving behind massed guitars and thunderous drums, Shelley and Rushent have evolved a richer and more varied dictionary of sounds... If it doesn't always convince, it's persuasive enough to warrant long-term investment." In The Trouser Press Guide to New Wave Records (1983), Trouser Press writer Steven Grant observed that "The turn to electronics doesn't signal a surrender to them", as "the songs, not the technique, remain paramount. Shelley seems to draw influence from a wide group of sources (such as the Doors and Marc Bolan), and the album cleverly sidesteps the trap of monotony that sometimes afflicted the Buzzcocks."

In retrospective reviews, Tim Sendra of AllMusic said, "The title track is the perfect example of the pair's vision for his new sound, combining robotic rhythms and otherworldly vocals, plus a bridge that is heart-stoppingly good even after hearing it a hundred times. The rest of the record may not have reached the lofty heights that song did, but there are plenty of moments where Shelley proves his inspiration worthy." Andrew Martin of Q felt that, apart from the title song, "too many tracks... sound like Depeche Mode offcuts".

== Track listings ==
All tracks written by Pete Shelley.

=== U.S. version ===
Side one

1. "Homosapien" – 4:32
2. "Yesterday's Not Here" – 4:08
3. "Love in Vain" – 3:05
4. "Just One of Those Affairs" – 3:37
5. "Qu'est-ce Que C'est Que Ça" – 4:18

Side two

1. "I Don't Know What It Is" – 3:27
2. "Witness the Change" – 4:47
3. "Guess I Must Have Been in Love with Myself" – 3:33
4. "I Generate a Feeling" – 3:10
5. "In Love with Somebody Else" – 3:00

=== UK version ===
Side one

1. "Homosapien" – 4:32
2. "Yesterday's Not Here" – 4:08
3. "I Generate a Feeling" – 3:10
4. "Keats' Song" – 1:58
5. "Qu'est-ce Que C'est Que Ça" – 4:18

Side two

1. "I Don't Know What It Is" – 3:27
2. "Guess I Must Have Been in Love with Myself" – 3:33
3. "Pusher Man" – 2:47
4. "Just One of Those Affairs" – 3:37
5. "It's Hard Enough Knowing" – 5:35

== Personnel ==
Credits adapted from 2025 CD liner notes.

- Pete Shelley – vocals, instruments
- Martin Rushent – programming, instruments

Technical

- Paul Henry – art direction
- Trevor Rogers – photography
- Bruno Tilley – graphics
- Martin Rushent – mastering

== Charts ==
Chart (1982)	Peak position
Australia (Kent Music Report)	42
Canada (RPM)	22

== Release history ==
Region	Date	Label	Format	Catalog
United States	1981	Arista	LP	AL 6606
United Kingdom	15 January 1982	Genetic Records/Island	LP	ILPS 9676
United Kingdom	15 January 1982	Genetic Records/Island	Cassette	ICT 9676
United Kingdom	23 June 1994	Grapevine	CD with six bonus tracks	GRACD 201
United States	21 January 1997	Razor & Tie	CD with five bonus tracks	RE 2126-2
United Kingdom	3 April 2006	Western Songs Ltd.	Remastered CD, same as Grapevine reissue	VARCD001
