= Homosapien (song) =

Single by Pete Shelley

from the album Homosapien
- B-side: "Keat's Song"; "Love in Vain" (1982)
- Released: September 1981 (UK)
- Recorded: 1981
- Genre: Electropop; new wave; pop rock
- Length: 4:34 (album version); 3:24 (single version)
- Label: Genetic (Island Records) WIP6720
- Songwriter: Pete Shelley
- Producers: Martin Rushent, Pete Shelley

Pete Shelley singles chronology
"Homosapien" (1981)	"I Don't Know What It Is" (1981)

Music video
- "Homosapien" on YouTube

"Homosapien" is a song by the English musician Pete Shelley. It was the first single from his album of the same title, released in 1981, and his first single as a solo performer after rising to fame with Buzzcocks.

Shelley wrote the song in 1974, before forming the Buzzcocks in 1976. Originally intended as a demo track for a Buzzcocks' song, "Homosapien" was recorded in one day with producer Martin Rushent, who would later go on to produce The Human League. The track adopted a synth pop sound in contrast to the Buzzcocks' harsh guitar riffs.

The single was a big hit in Australia and Canada, reaching the Top 10 in both countries, as well as being a modest hit in New Zealand. Although it failed to cross over to singles charts in Europe or the United States, it was a popular dance track in clubs across both territories and reached number 14 on the Billboard Club Play Singles chart.

The song reportedly was banned by the BBC for its "explicit reference to gay sex" with the lyrics "homo superior / in my interior". Shelley said the line was not intended as innuendo, telling The Advocate "In my naivete...I never thought it would be taken for a description of sex. I try not to make my lyrics obscene." However, he said other lines had been written with intentional homoerotic implications, and even his mother thought the song had obvious homosexual undertones. According to then BBC Radio 1 DJ Annie Nightingale, "Its then risqué lyrics were noted at the time. Didn't stop me playing it on my radio show."

== Reception ==
In a 1982 Trouser Press review, Jim Green said the song was "proof that Shelley is still a masterful maker of singles...and he still delivers punchy pop-rock." Green ranked "Homosapien" at no. 8 in his Top 10 45s of 1981 list. Charles Shaar Murray named it single of the week in NME, calling it "Shelley's coming-out as a solo artist, and it's a sharp number with a decidedly crisp rhythm, Bowiesque acoustic guitar, and vocals and a melody line you will not forget."

== Lyrics ==
Lucas Hilderbrand, a professor at UC Irvine, sees "Homosapien" as a "curious pride anthem" that never uses the word "gay" in its lyrics, much like other tracks by queer artists from the time, for example Soft Cell's "Tainted Love" and Queen and David Bowie's "Under Pressure". Hilderbrand interprets the verse "and I just hope and pray / that the day / of our love is at hand... / And the world is so wrong / that I hope that we'll be strong..." as a message of solidarity against homophobia. Further, Hilderbrand reads "I don't wanna classify you like an animal in the zoo / But it seems good to me to know that you're Homosapien, too" as a statement on "refusing and then reconfirming identity categories", proclaiming a hope for gay rights but rejecting an "essentialist" label such as homosexual or gay.

== Impact ==
Ian Young, in a tribute to Shelley written for the BBC, called "Homosapien" "an out-and-out electro LGBT anthem," and the track was popular at gay dance clubs at the time it came out. Hilderbrand has described "Homosapien" as the "most homo-positive hit of" 1981.

== Charts ==
=== Weekly charts ===
Weekly chart performance for "Homosapien"
Charts (1981–1982)	Peak position
Australia (Kent Music Report)	4
Canada (RPM)	6
New Zealand (RMNZ)	11

=== Year-end charts ===
Year-end chart performance for "Homosapien"
Chart (1982)	Position
Australia (Kent Music Report)	36
Canada (RPM)	54
