= The Diagram Brothers =

English post-punk band

- Origin: Manchester, England
- Genres: Post punk
- Years active: 1979–1982
- Labels: Construct, New Hormones, LTM
- Members: Andy Diagram; Fraser Diagram (b. Reich); Lawrence Diagram (b. Fitzgerald); Jason Diagram (b. Pitchers); Simon Diagram (b. Pitchers)

The Diagram Brothers were an English post-punk band from Manchester active between 1979 and 1982. The band comprised Andy Diagram (bass guitar), Fraser Diagram (vocals, guitar), Lawrence Diagram (guitar), Jason Diagram (bass), and Simon Diagram (drums) (not actually brothers). Andy Diagram was also a member of Dislocation Dance from 1978 to 1982, and in 1985, and was a member of The Pale Fountains and James.

Andy Diagram explained the band's approach: "We called the music 'Discordo'. The music was made to a strict formula or set of rules. All the guitar chords were based on discordant notes, all the beats were very simple rock or disco, and all the words were very very straightforward and down to earth." Music journalist, Stuart Maconie, described them as "funny, slightly scary and like no one else in the world".

The band's first release was a 7-inch EP on the Construct label in 1980. They were then signed by Buzzcocks' New Hormones label, who issued a single, "Bricks", an album, Some Marvels of Modern Science, and a 10-inch EP, Discordo, before the band split up. They have been compared to The Residents and XTC.

They recorded three sessions for John Peel's BBC Radio 1 show. Their collected studio recordings (including the Peel sessions) have since been released on CD by the LTM label.

== Discography ==
Chart placings shown are from the UK Indie Chart.

- "We Are All Animals" 7-inch EP (1980) Construct (#30)
- "Bricks" 7-inch single (1981) New Hormones (#46)
- Some Marvels of Modern Science LP (1981) New Hormones
- Discordo 10-inch EP (1982) New Hormones
- German E.P. 7-inch EP (1982) Outatune
- Some Marvels of Modern Science + Singles CD (2007) LTM (LTMCD 2480)
- The Peel Sessions CD (2011) LTM (LTMCD 2558)
