= Dislocation Dance =

English post-punk band

- Origin: Manchester, England
- Genre: Post-punk
- Years active: 1978–1986; 2009–present
- Labels: New Hormones; The Music Label; Rough Trade; LTM; Slipped Discs
- Members: Ian Runacres; Phil Lukes; Jon Board; Chris Gravestock; Andrew Weaver; Sam Heywood
- Past members: Andy Diagram; Paul Emmerson; Richard Harrison; Kath Way; Sonja Clegg; Herbie Bryan; Ian Rogers

Dislocation Dance are an English post-punk band from Manchester, England. The group's original line-up is obscure; their first EP, a self-titled 7" as a co-release between two labels, Delicate Issues and New Hormones recorded in May 1980, lists its line-up as 'B' on vocals and keyboard; 'Don' on drums; 'Ian' on vocals and guitar, and 'Paul' on bass, but also mentions 'Past members of the band' as Rod Bloor, Kathryn Way, Tim Glasser, Ian Rogers (drummer, who subsequently joined Blue Orchids) and Julie Gask.

The group proper formed in 1978 and comprised chief songwriter Ian Runacres (vocals, guitar), Andy Diagram (trumpet, vocals, also of the Diagram Brothers), Paul Emmerson (bass), and Richard Harrison (drums). The Slip That Disc album featured a much more confident and tight sound, and included a cover of the Beatles' "We Can Work It Out". Both this release and the group's second album Music Music Music (1981) featured the Runacres, Diagram, Emmerson and Harrison line-up. New Hormones also issued a string of poppy singles by the band, including "Rosemary", and "You'll Never Never Know", before the pioneering label closed due to lack of funds. The second of these included Kathryn Way as vocalist.

In 1982, Dislocation Dance signed to Rough Trade. 1984's Midnight Shift album saw the band explore a more jazzy pop sound. A final EP, What's Going On, saw the replacement of Way by Sonja Clegg with Herbie Bryan joining on saxophone. The band broke up in 1986, with Clegg going solo and releasing an album in 1987, and Diagram joining James.

In 2000, the group reformed for a tour of Japan. The original members Runacres, Way, Harrison and Diagram were joined by Phil Lukes (previously in the Mancinis and Dutch Uncle). Lukes had also worked with Runacres on a project under the name Brightside. Andy Diagram and Richard Harrison also formed a trumpet and drums duo under the name spaceheads. They have released seven albums and toured the world since 1993.

A new Dislocation Dance album, Cromer, was released by Vinyl Japan in 2005. This featured Runacres, Lukes, Diagram, and several other performers. The BBC sessions had been released on CD by Vinyl Japan in 1999, and the band's New Hormones and Rough Trade catalogue issued on remastered CDs by LTM in 2006.

In 2007, Dislocation Dance played in Manchester, at the Carlton Club in Whalley Range. The line-up consisted of Runacres, Lukes, Way and Harrison again. They were joined by Jon Board (trumpet) and Andrew Weaver (keyboards). Runacres, Lukes, Board and Weaver began working on new material and, in 2009, were joined by Chris Gravestock (drums). Their fifth studio album, The Ruins of Manchester, was released in May 2012. This was followed by their sixth and latest album, on LTM Records, Are We There Yet?, released in 2017 and featuring their new vocalist Sam Heywood. A seven track EP - Discombobulation was released in October 2020 to raise funds for the Help Joel Live Longer campaign.

== Discography ==
Chart placings shown are from the UK Indie Chart.

=== Albums ===
- Slip That Disc (1981) New Hormones
- Music Music Music (1981) New Hormones (No. 27) (reissued by LTM on CD)
- Midnight Shift (1984) Rough Trade (No. 14) (reissued by LTM on CD)
- BBC Sessions (1999) Vinyl Japan
- Cromer (2005) Vinyl Japan
- The Ruins of Manchester (2012) LTM
- Are We There Yet? (2017) LTM

=== Singles/EPs ===
- Dislocation Dance EP (1980) New Hormones
- "Rosemary" (1982) New Hormones (No. 46)
- "You'll Never Never Know" (1982) New Hormones
- "Violette" (1983) The Music label
- "Show Me" (1983) Rough Trade
- What's Going On EP (1985) Slipped Discs
- "Discombobulation" (2020) German Shepherd Records
