= Linder Sterling =

British artist known as Linder

Linder
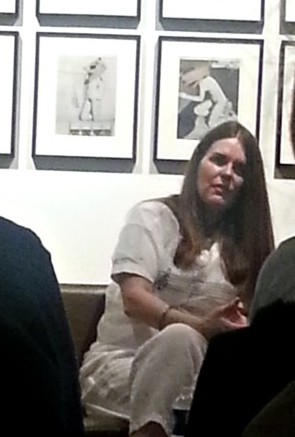
- Sterling in 2012
- Born: Linda Mulvey; 1954 (age 71–72); Liverpool, UK
- Known for: Photomontage; Photography; Post-punk
- Movement: Feminist art movement
- Children: Maxwell Sterling
- Awards: Paul Hamlyn Foundation Award (2017)

Linder Sterling (born 1954, Liverpool), commonly known as Linder, is a British artist known for her photography, radical feminist photomontage and confrontational performance art. She was also the former frontwoman of Manchester-based post-punk group Ludus. In 2017, Sterling was honoured with the Paul Hamlyn Foundation Award.

Recent solo exhibitions include Nottingham Contemporary, Kestnergesellschaft, Musée d'Art Moderne de Paris, and Museum of Modern Art PS1, and Sterling's work has been included in group exhibitions at Tate Modern, Australian Centre for Contemporary Art, Tate Britain, and Museum of Contemporary Art Chicago.

== Early life and education ==
Linder was born in Liverpool to Jean and Thomas Mulvey. She attended Upholland Grammar School.

From 1974-1977, Linder studied Graphic Design at Manchester School of Art at Manchester Polytechnic (now Manchester Metropolitan University).

== Career ==
Linder also designed the cover for Magazine’s 1978 debut album Real Life.

Linder has collaborated with several fashion designers including Richard Nicoll, Louise Gray, Christopher Shannon and Ashish Gupta.

For her solo shows at the Hepworth Wakefield and Tate St Ives in 2013, Sterling collaborated with choreographer Kenneth Tindall of Northern Ballet for a performance piece, The Ultimate Form (2013), inspired by the artist's research into the work of Barbara Hepworth. She went on to work on a second ballet with Tindall titled Children of the Stain, inspired by artists Ithell Colquhoun and Barbara Hepworth. She produced the costumes for this ballet with Richard Nicoll.

== Work ==
Sterling's photomontage work was influenced by the punk rock movement; the punk cut-and-paste sensibility provided a vehicle to explore rebellion, gender, commodity critique, and the body. Her collage work was also influenced by the art historical Dadaist heritage, in particular the work of the German artist Hannah Hoch). She cites Dawn Adès' 1976 'Photomontage' as a major influence. She was also influenced by Aubrey Beardsley.

In one of her early works, possibly her best known, the cover art for the 1977 single release of "Orgasm Addict" by the punk band Buzzcocks, the collage depicts a naked woman with an iron for a head and grinning mouths instead of nipples. Linder has instructed her son to not release the identity of the woman whose picture she used for the collage until after her death.

"At this point, men's magazines were either DIY, cars or porn. Women's magazines were fashion or domestic stuff. So, guess the common denominator – the female body. I took the female form from both sets of magazines and made these peculiar jigsaws highlighting these various cultural monstrosities that I felt there were at the time."

Rolling Stone described Sterling's work as "subversive photomontages which splice images from consumer culture and glossy glamour magazines".

Linder has boxes of cut-outs in her studio that she works from. In her studio, Linder listens to Indian drone music, and scents the space with perfume.

== Exhibitions ==
Sterling's work has been the subject of numerous international solo exhibitions, including those at the Tate Museum St. Ives, Nottingham Contemporary, Kestnergesellschaft, among others. Her work has been featured in group shows at the Tate Modern, Tate Britain, the Museum of Contemporary Art, Chicago, Australian Centre for Contemporary Art, among other venues.

Sterling's work is represented by Modern Art; Andréhn-Schiptjenko; and dépendance.

- May/September 2007: MoMA/P.S.1 (first U.S. solo exhibition)
- February/April 2013: Femme / Objet, Musée d'Art Moderne de Paris
- November 2023/April 2024: Women in Revolt!, Tate Modern

== Public art ==
In 2018, Sterling was commissioned by Art on the Underground to produce a public art work at Southwark station. The Bower of Bliss, her first large-scale public art piece in London, consisted of an 85-metre long street-level photomontage billboard and a cover commission for the 29th edition of the pocket Tube map. Its launch was marked with a performance art piece in November 2018.

== Performance ==
- The Bower of Bliss: An Improper Architecture, Women's Art Collection, Murray Edwards College, Cambridge, March 2020
- The Bower of Bliss, Southwark Underground Station, London, November 2018 for Art on the Underground
- Destination Moon. You must not look at her!, Duke of York Steps, London, 2016
- Donkey Skin, Art Night, Institute of Contemporary Arts, London, 2016
- Children of the Mantic Stain, Leeds Art Gallery, 2015
- The Ultimate Form, Salle Matisse, Musée d'art moderne de la ville de Paris, 2013
- The Darktown Cakewalk: Celebrated from the House of FAME, produced by Sorcha Dallas for the Glasgow International Festival of Visual Art, Glasgow, 2010
- The Darktown Cakewalk: Celebrated from the House of FAME, Chisenhale Gallery, London, 2010
- The Working Class Goes To Paradise, Tate Triennial, Tate Britain, London, 2006
- Ludus, Hacienda, Manchester, 1982

== Ludus ==
In 1978, Linder founded the post-punk band Ludus. Ludus' music ranged from post-punk to avant-garde and cocktail jazz. Linder performed as their singer and front-woman until the band split-up in 1983. Her distinctive vocal quality and techniques (including screaming, unusual sounds and laughter) combined with her lyrics, focused on female desire, alienation, sexual politics and gender roles. Notoriously, in 1982, she performed wearing a dress made of raw meat.

Linder designed many of the group's album covers and sleeves.

The bulk of the band's material was originally released on the indie labels New Hormones and Crepuscule.

== Publications ==
- Linder, published by Ridinghouse 2015
- Femme/Objet, published by Musée d'Art moderne de la ville de Paris, 2013, on the occasion of Linder's solo exhibition
- Linder: Works 1976–2006, (with essays written by Jon Savage, Philip Hoare, Lynne Tillman, Paul Bayley, Andrew Renton and Morrissey), published by JRP|Editions, 2006

== Collections ==
Sterling's work is included in the permanent collection of the Tate Modern Museum, the Museum of Modern Art, among others.

== Honours and awards ==
In 2005, Sterling received a grant from the Arts Council of England. In 2017, she received the Paul Hamlyn Foundation Award for her creative work. In 2018, she was named the first Artist-in-Residence at Chatsworth House in Derbyshire. Her work during the residency was inspired by the Act of Representation of the People, which gave women over the age of thirty the right to vote.

== Personal life ==
Linder has a son, Maxwell Sterling.

Linder lives and works in London.

Sterling is a long time friend of The Smiths lead singer, Morrissey, since they met at a Sex Pistols soundcheck in Manchester in 1976. Sterling was the inspiration for The Smiths' critically acclaimed song "Cemetry Gates".

== Bibliography ==
- O'Brien, Lucy (1999). "The woman punk made me". In Sabin, Roger (ed.). Punk Rock: So What?. Routledge. pp. 186–198.
- Rogan, Johnny (1992). Morrissey and Marr: The Severed Alliance. Omnibus Press. pp. 102–103, 109–111.
