= Pete Shelley =

English singer-songwriter (1955–2018)

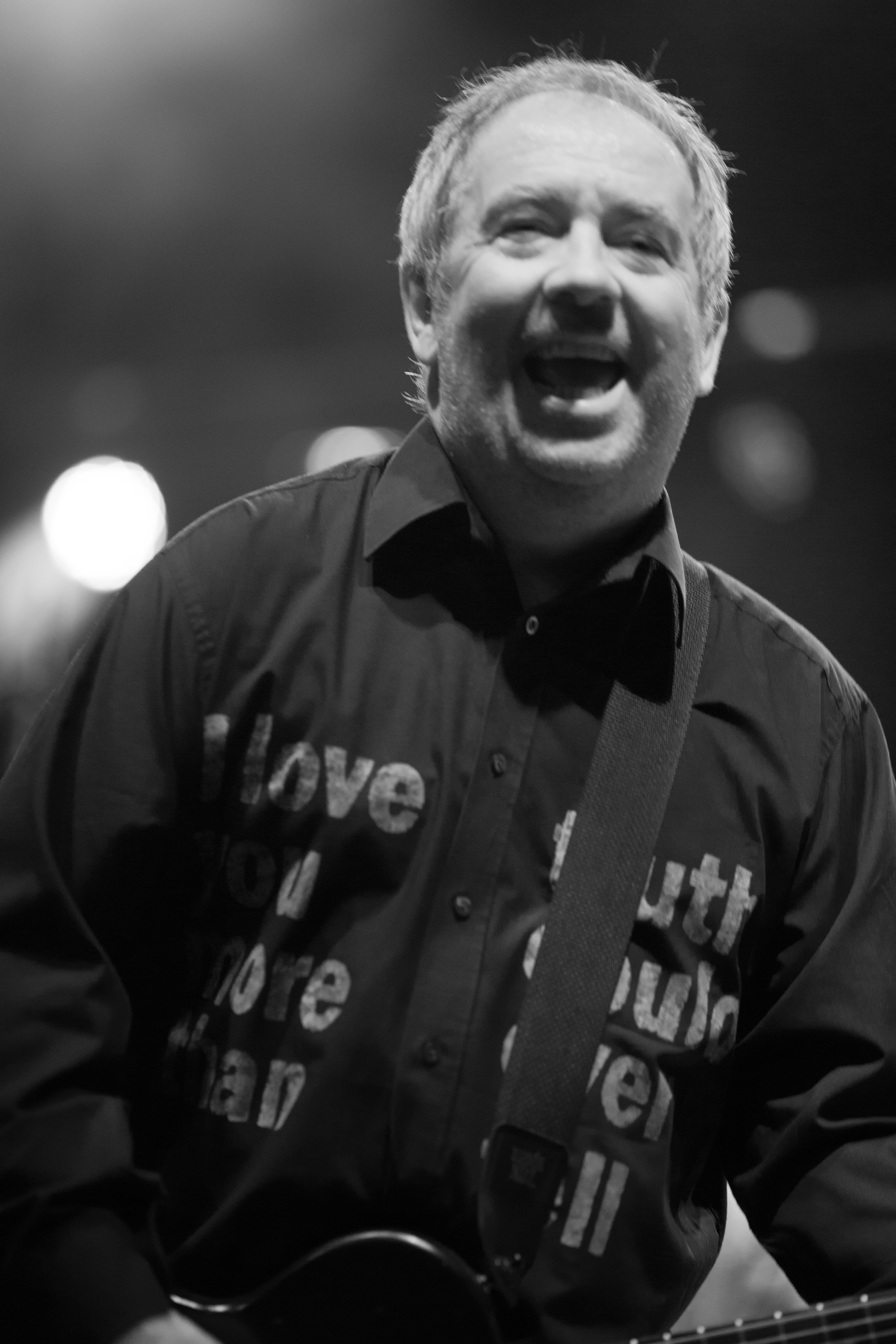
- Shelley in Melbourne, 2013

Background information
- Born: Peter Campbell McNeish; 17 April 1955; Leigh, Lancashire, England
- Origin: Bolton, England
- Died: 6 December 2018 (aged 63) Tallinn, Estonia
- Genres: Punk rock; pop punk; new wave; power pop
- Occupations: Musician, singer, songwriter, guitarist
- Instruments: Vocals, guitar
- Years active: 1973–2018
- Labels: I.R.S., Cooking Vinyl, Island
- Website: buzzcocks.com

Pete Shelley (born Peter Campbell McNeish; 17 April 1955 – 6 December 2018) was an English singer, songwriter and guitarist. He formed early punk band Buzzcocks with Howard Devoto in 1976, and became the lead singer and guitarist in 1977 when Devoto left. The group released their biggest hit "Ever Fallen in Love (With Someone You Shouldn't've)" in 1978. The band broke up in 1981 and reformed at the end of the decade. Shelley also had a solo career; his song "Homosapien" charted in Australasia and Canada in 1981 and 1982.

== Biography ==
Shelley was born to Margaret and John McNeish in Leigh, Lancashire. His mother was an ex-mill worker in the town and his father was a fitter at Astley Green Colliery. He had a younger brother, Gary. Shelley's stage name is inspired by Percy Bysshe Shelley, his favourite poet.

=== Buzzcocks ===
Shelley formed Buzzcocks with Howard Devoto after they met at the Bolton Institute of Technology (now the University of Greater Manchester) in 1975 and subsequently travelled to High Wycombe, near London, to see the Sex Pistols. The band included bass guitarist Steve Diggle and drummer John Maher; they made their first appearance in 1976 in Manchester, opening for the Sex Pistols.

In 1977 Buzzcocks released their first EP, Spiral Scratch, on their independent label, New Hormones. When Devoto left the band in February 1977, Shelley took over as the lead vocalist and chief songwriter. Working with the producer Martin Rushent, the band created the punk/new wave singles "Orgasm Addict", "What Do I Get?" and "Ever Fallen in Love (With Someone You Shouldn't've)", along with three LPs: Another Music in a Different Kitchen (1978), Love Bites (1978) and A Different Kind of Tension (1979). Difficulties with their record company and a dispute with Virgin Publishing over the UK release of their greatest hits record, Singles Going Steady, brought the band to a halt in 1981.

Shelley developed a different personal image from many of his rebellious 1970s punk contemporaries, telling Melody Maker in 1978, "I won't be nasty. We're just four nice lads, the kind of people you could take home to your parents."

=== Solo career ===
Shelley's solo début album Sky Yen was recorded in 1974, but remained unheard until it was released on 12" vinyl on Shelley's own label, Groovy Records, in March 1980. It was recorded as a continuous piece of music using a purpose-built oscillator, and used layered electronics and playback speed manipulation to achieve its experimental feel. Rooted in electronic music, it has been compared with krautrock. Also released on Groovy Records was the soundtrack LP Hangahar by Sally Timms and Lindsay Lee, which included Shelley as a musician, and an album by artists Eric Random, Barry Adamson and Francis Cookson under the name Free Agents. Groovy Records did not release any other records.

Shortly after the success of "Ever Fallen In Love....", Shelley produced an EP by Manchester band Mellatron, including Dave Tucker and Karl Burns, both at various times members of The Fall, but it was never released, after the record label's owner was arrested and the master tapes disappeared.

In 1981, Shelley released his first solo single, "Homosapien", produced by Rushent. On this recording he returned to his original interests in electronic music and shifted emphasis from guitar to synthesiser; Rushent's elaborate drum machine and synthesiser programming laid the groundwork for his next production, the chart-topping album Dare by the Human League. "Homosapien" was banned by the BBC for "explicit reference to gay sex". "Homosapien" peaked at number fourteen in the US dance chart. Shelley talked openly about his bisexuality at this time, which had been implicit in many of the songs he had written, but now came to wider attention due to "Homosapien" and the BBC ban. The single was followed by an LP of the same title.

Shelley released his second LP XL1 in 1983 on Genetic Records. As well as the minor hit "Telephone Operator", the album included a computer program for the ZX Spectrum with lyrics and graphics that displayed in time to the music. XL1 was produced by Rushent and Shelley.

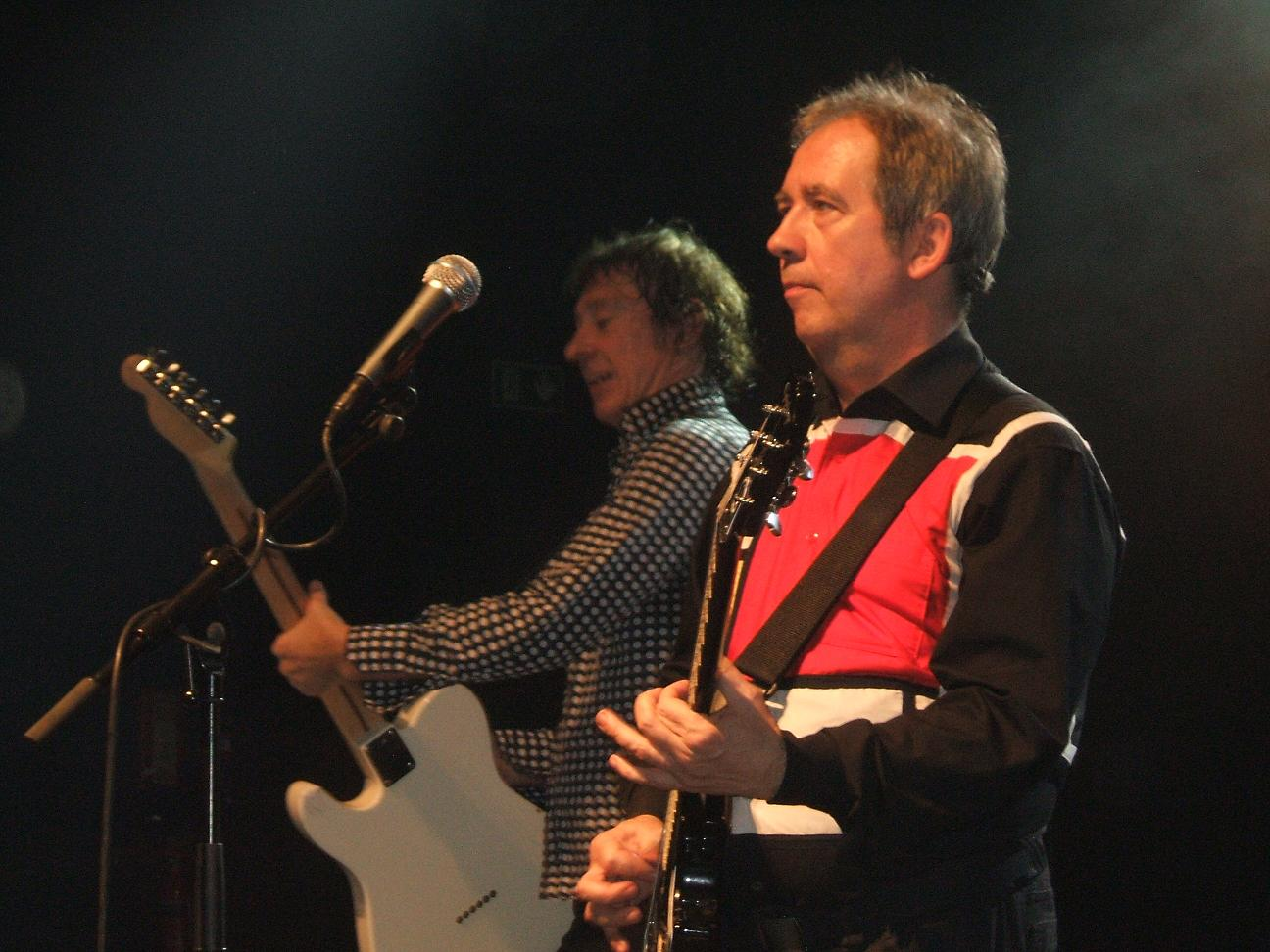
Pete Shelley singing with Buzzcocks at Shepherds Bush Empire, 30 January 2009

In mid-1984, Shelley released the single "Never Again", followed by the album Heaven and the Sea in 1986. In 1987, he followed the album with a new song, "Do Anything", for the film Some Kind of Wonderful. He composed the theme music for the intro of the Tour de France on Channel 4, which was used from the late 1980s to the mid-1990s.

Shelley recorded a new version of "Homosapien", called "Homosapien II", in 1989. The single featured four mixes of the new recording. He played with various other musicians during his career, including The Invisible Girls who backed punk poet John Cooper Clarke. Shelley also formed a short-lived band called the Tiller Boys. He briefly reunited with Howard Devoto to make the LP Buzzkunst, released in 2002. Shelley appeared on the 2005 début EP by the Los Angeles band The Adored, who toured with Buzzcocks the following year.

=== Buzzcocks reform ===
Buzzcocks reunited in 1989 and released a new full-length album, Trade Test Transmissions, in 1993. They continued to tour and record and released the album The Way in 2014. In 2005 Shelley re-recorded "Ever Fallen in Love (With Someone You Shouldn't've)" with an all-star group, including Roger Daltrey, David Gilmour, Peter Hook, Elton John, Robert Plant and several contemporary bands, as a tribute to John Peel; proceeds went to Amnesty International. Shelley performed the song live at the 2005 UK Music Hall of Fame.

== Personal life and death ==
Shelley was bisexual and based some of his songs on his own attractions. Shelley was married to Miniko in 1991 and divorced in 2002. Their son Alex was born in 1993. He then moved to Tallinn, Estonia, in 2012 after marrying Greta, an Estonian, preferring the less-hectic pace there to London where he had lived for nearly 30 years. He died there of a suspected heart attack on the morning of 6 December 2018. His brother, Gary McNeish, announced his death on Facebook.

Tributes to Shelley came from a diverse range of music industry professionals, including Pearl Jam, Duff McKagan, Pixies, Peter Hook, Duran Duran, Billie Joe Armstrong, Mike Joyce, Noel Gallagher, Gary Kemp and Glen Matlock. Billy Bragg played "Ever Fallen in Love (With Someone You Shouldn't've)", on 7 December 2018 at the Meredith Music Festival.

Following his death, the Pete Shelley Memorial campaign was established to raise funds to create a lasting memorial in his hometown for his achievements and contributions to the music industry.

== Discography ==
=== Albums ===
- Sky Yen (1980) Groovy Records
- Hangahar (1980) by Sally Smmit (aka Sally Timms of The Mekons) musicians group included Pete Shelley) Groovy Records
- Homosapien (1981) Genetic-Island/Arista; AUS No. 42, CAN No. 22
- XL1 (1983) Island/Arista
- Heaven and the Sea (1986)
- Buzzkunst (2002) as shelleydevoto (with Howard Devoto)

=== Singles ===
- "Homosapien" (1981), Genetic-Island/Arista - AUS No. 4, CAN No. 6, US Dance No. 14
- "I Don't Know What It Is" (1981), Genetic-Island/Arista - US Dance No. 22
- "Witness the Change" (1981) - US Dance No. 63
- "Qu'est-Ce Que C'est Que Ça" (1982)
- "Homosapien" (1982), Genetic-Island/Arista
- "Telephone Operator" (1983), Island/Arista - US Dance No. 22, UK No. 66
- "Millions of People (No One Like You)" (1983) - UK No. 94
- "Never Again" (1984), Immaculate
- "Waiting for Love" (1986), Mercury
- "On Your Own" (1986), Mercury - US Dance No. 10
- "Blue Eyes" (1986), Mercury
- "I Surrender" (1986), Mercury
- "Your Love" (1988)
- "Homosapien II" (Pete Shelley vs. Power, Wonder and Love) (1989), Immaculate
