= The Charlatans discography =

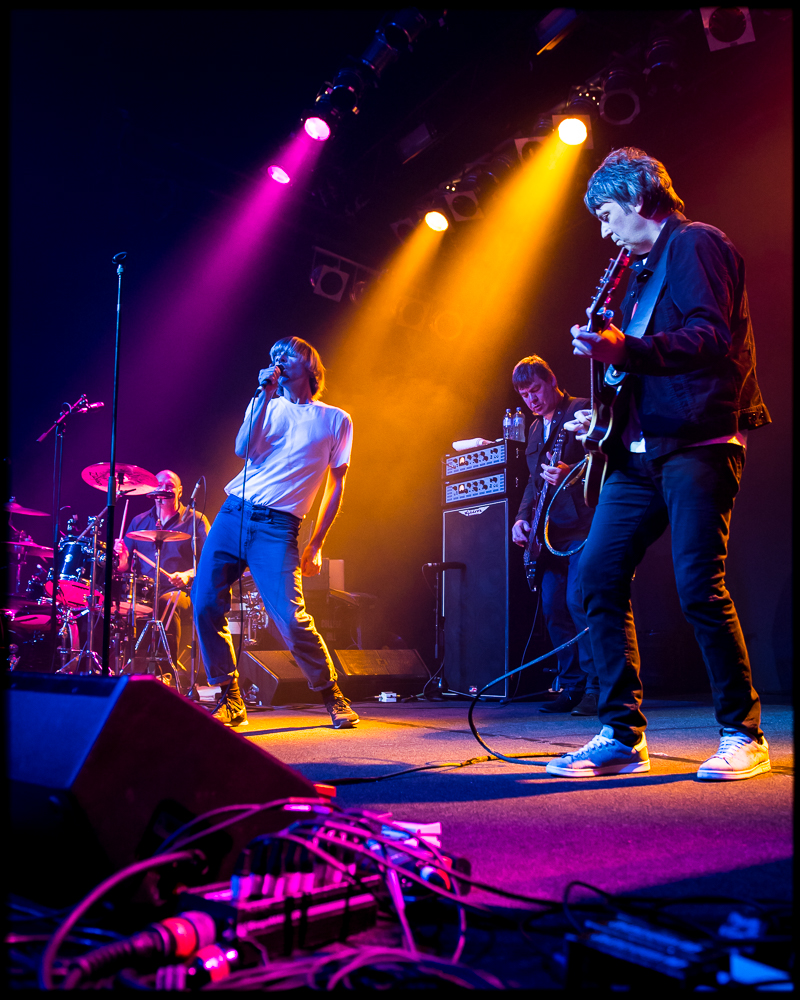
- The Charlatans performing live in 2018
- Studio albums: 14
- Live albums: 3
- Compilation albums: 6
- Singles: 48

This is a discography by the British indie rock band The Charlatans.

== Albums ==
=== Studio albums ===
Title	Album details	Peak chart positions										Certifications
Title	Album details	UK	UK Indie	AUS	IRE	NED	NZ	NOR	SCO	SWE	US	Certifications
Some Friendly	Released: 8 October 1990; Label: Situation Two; Format: CD, CS, DL, LP	1	—	79	—	—	48	—	—	27	73	UK: Gold
Between 10th and 11th	Released: 23 March 1992; Label: Situation Two; Format: CD, CS, DL, LP	21	—	—	—	73	—	—	—	—	173	
Up to Our Hips	Released: 21 March 1994; Label: Beggars Banquet; Format: CD, CS, DL, LP	8	—	151	—	—	—	—	10	—	—	UK: Silver
The Charlatans	Released: 28 August 1995; Label: Beggars Banquet; Format: CD, CS, DL, LP	1	—	137	—	—	—	—	1	28	—	UK: Gold
Tellin' Stories	Released: 21 April 1997; Label: Beggars Banquet; Format: CD, CS, DL, LP	1	3	106	—	—	—	37	1	35	—	UK: Platinum
Us and Us Only	Released: 18 October 1999; Label: Universal; Format: CD, CS, DL, LP	2	—	—	—	—	—	—	2	—	—	UK: Gold
Wonderland	Released: 10 September 2001; Label: Universal; Format: CD, CS, DL, LP	2	—	—	9	—	—	—	1	—	—	UK: Gold
Up at the Lake	Released: 17 May 2004; Label: Universal/Island; Format: CD, CS, DL, LP	13	—	—	32	—	—	—	6	—	—	UK: Silver
Simpatico	Released: 17 April 2006; Label: Creole/Sanctuary; Format: CD, DL, LP	10	1	—	83	—	—	—	5	—	—	
You Cross My Path	Released: 12 May 2008; Label: Cooking Vinyl; Format: CD, DL, LP	39	2	—	96	—	—	—	25	—	—	
Who We Touch	Released: 6 September 2010; Label: Cooking Vinyl; Format: CD, DL, LP	21	2	—	98	—	—	—	15	—	—	
Modern Nature	Released: 26 January 2015; Label: BMG; Format: CD, DL, LP	7	1	—	25	—	—	—	3	—	—	
Different Days	Released: 26 May 2017; Label: BMG; Format: CD, CS, DL, LP	4	1	—	35	—	—	—	4	—	—	
We Are Love	Released: 31 October 2025; Label: BMG; Format: CD, CS, DL, LP	8	1	—	—	—	—	—	2	—	—	
"—" denotes items that did not chart or were not released in that territory.

=== Compilation albums ===
Title	Album details	Peak chart positions			Certifications
Title	Album details	UK	UK Indie	SCO	Certifications
Melting Pot	Released: 23 February 1998; Label: Beggars Banquet; Format: CD, CS, DL, LP	4	1	1	UK: Platinum
Songs from the Other Side	Released: 20 May 2002; Label: Beggars Banquet; Format: CD	55	6	38	
Forever. The Singles	Released: 13 November 2006; Label: Universal; Format: CD, DL	38	—	27	UK: Silver
Collection	Released: 22 October 2007; Label: Spectrum; Format: CD	—	—	—	
The Best of the BBC Recordings 1999–2006	Released: 14 July 2008; Label: Universal; Format: CD	—	—	—	
A Head Full of Ideas	Released: 15 October 2021; Label: Then (THEN1CDX); Format: CD, DL, LP, streaming	11	—	—	
"—" denotes items that did not chart or were not released in that territory.

=== Live albums ===
Title	Album details	Peak chart positions		
Title	Album details	UK	UK Indie	SCO
Live It Like You Love It	Released: 22 July 2002; Label: Universal; Format: CD	40	—	33
Live at Delamere Forest	Released: 31 July 2007; Label: Self-released; Format: DL	—	—	—
Some Friendly – 20th Anniversary Concerts	Released: 14 May 2010; Label: Concert Live; Format: CD	—	18	—
"—" denotes items that did not chart or were not released in that territory.

== Singles ==
Year	Title	Peak chart positions										Certifications	Album
Year	Title	UK	UK Indie	AUS	IRE	NED	SCO	SWE	US Alt.	US Club	US Rock	Certifications	Album
1990	"Indian Rope"	89	—	—	—	—	—	—	—	—	—		Non-album single
1990	"The Only One I Know"	9	—	75	11	56	—	—	5	—	37	BPI: Gold	Some Friendly
1990	"Then"	12	—	104	11	—	—	—	4	—	—		Some Friendly
1991	"White Shirt"	—	—	—	—	—	—	—	18	—	—		Some Friendly
1991	"Sproston Green"	—	—	—	—	—	—	—	25	—	—		Some Friendly
1991	"Over Rising"	15	—	146	7	—	—	—	—	—	—		Non-album singles
1991	"Indian Rope" (re-issue)	57	—	—	—	—	—	—	—	—	—		Non-album singles
1991	"Me. In Time"	28	—	—	12	—	—	—	—	—	—		Non-album singles
1992	"Weirdo"	19	—	—	22	67	—	—	1	10	—		Between 10th and 11th
1992	"Tremelo Song"	44	—	—	—	—	—	—	—	—	—		Between 10th and 11th
1992	"I Don't Want to See the Sights"	—	—	—	—	—	—	—	13	—	—		Between 10th and 11th
1994	"Can't Get Out of Bed"	24	—	—	—	—	—	—	6	—	—		Up to Our Hips
1994	"I Never Want an Easy Life If Me and He Were Ever to Get There"	38	—	—	—	—	23	—	—	—	—		Up to Our Hips
1994	"Jesus Hairdo"	48	—	—	—	—	37	—	—	—	—		Up to Our Hips
1994	"Crashin' In"	31	—	—	—	—	26	—	—	—	—		The Charlatans
1995	"Just Lookin'"/"Bullet Comes"	32	—	—	—	—	18	—	—	—	—		The Charlatans
1995	"Just When You're; Thinkin' Things Over"	12	—	—	—	—	5	—	—	—	—		The Charlatans
1996	"One to Another"	3	—	—	25	—	1	59	—	—	—	BPI: Silver	Tellin' Stories
1997	"North Country Boy"	4	—	—	—	—	1	—	—	—	—	BPI: Silver	Tellin' Stories
1997	"How High"	6	—	—	—	—	3	—	—	—	—		Tellin' Stories
1997	"Tellin' Stories"	16	2	—	—	—	9	—	—	—	—		Tellin' Stories
1999	"Forever"	12	—	—	—	—	8	—	—	—	—		Us and Us Only
1999	"My Beautiful Friend"	31	—	—	—	—	24	—	—	—	—		Us and Us Only
2000	"Impossible"	15	—	—	—	—	10	—	—	—	—		Us and Us Only
2001	"Love Is the Key"	16	—	—	—	—	12	—	—	—	—		Wonderland
2001	"A Man Needs to Be Told"	31	—	—	—	—	30	—	—	—	—		Wonderland
2004	"Up at the Lake"	23	—	—	—	—	20	—	—	—	—		Up at the Lake
2004	"Try Again Today"	24	—	—	—	—	24	—	—	—	—		Up at the Lake
2004	"Loving You Is Easy" (radio single)	—	—	—	—	—	—	—	—	—	—		Up at the Lake
2006	"Blackened Blue Eyes"	28	3	—	40	—	10	—	—	—	—		Simpatico
2006	"NYC (There's No Need to Stop)"	53	6	—	—	—	24	—	—	—	—		Simpatico
2006	"You're So Pretty, We're So Pretty" (Originally featured on the album Wonderland in 2001)	56	—	—	—	—	30	—	—	—	—		Forever: The Singles
2007	"You Cross My Path" (free download)	—	—	—	—	—	—	—	—	—	—		You Cross My Path
2008	"Oh! Vanity" (free download)	—	—	—	—	—	—	—	—	—	—		You Cross My Path
2008	"The Misbegotten"	—	5	—	—	—	—	—	—	—	—		You Cross My Path
2008	"Mis-Takes"	—	—	—	—	—	—	—	—	—	—		You Cross My Path
2008	"Oh! Vanity" (re-issue)	—	3	—	—	—	—	—	—	—	—		You Cross My Path
2010	"Love is Ending"	—	—	—	—	—	—	—	—	—	—		Who We Touch
2010	"My Foolish Pride"	—	—	—	—	—	—	—	—	—	—		Who We Touch
2010	"Your Pure Soul"	—	—	—	—	—	—	—	—	—	—		Who We Touch
2014	"Talking in Tones"	—	—	—	—	—	—	—	—	—	—		Modern Nature
2014	"So Oh"	—	—	—	—	—	—	—	—	—	—		Modern Nature
2015	"Come Home Baby"	—	—	—	—	—	—	—	—	—	—		Modern Nature
2015	"Let The Good Times Be Never Ending"	—	—	—	—	—	—	—	—	—	—		Modern Nature
2017	"Plastic Machinery"	—	—	—	—	—	—	—	—	—	—		Different Days
2017	"Different Days"	—	—	—	—	—	—	—	—	—	—		Different Days
2017	"Over Again"	—	—	—	—	—	—	—	—	—	—		Different Days
2018	"Totally Eclipsing"	—	—	—	—	—	43	—	—	—	—		Totally Eclipsing
2025	"We Are Love"	—	—	—	—	—	—	—	—	—	—		We Are Love
2025	"Deeper and Deeper"	—	—	—	—	—	—	—	—	—	—		We Are Love
"—" denotes items that did not chart or were not released in that territory.

== Videos ==
- Just Lookin' 1990–1997 (20 May 2002)
- Live at Last (11 April 2005)
- Forever: The Singles (13 November 2006)
