= The Charlatans (1995 album) =

Studio album by the Charlatans
- Released: 28 August 1995
- Studios: Monnow Valley, Rockfield, Monmouthshire; Rockfield, Rockfield, Monmouthshire
- Genres: Britpop; power pop
- Length: 52:05
- Label: Beggars Banquet
- Producers: The Charlatans; Dave Charles; Steve Hillage

The Charlatans chronology
Up to Our Hips (1994)	The Charlatans (1995)	Tellin' Stories (1997)

Singles from The Charlatans
- 1. "Crashin' In" Released: 28 December 1994; 2. "Just Lookin'" / "Bullet Comes" Released: 8 May 1995; 3. "Just When You're Thinkin' Things Over" Released: 7 August 1995

The Charlatans is the fourth studio album by the British rock band the Charlatans, released on 28 August 1995 through Beggars Banquet Records. Following a holiday, vocalist Tim Burgess and guitarist Mark Collins wrote material for their next album at Burgess' place in Chalk Farm. The band then absconded to Monnow Valley Studio in Rockfield, Monmouthshire, Wales, with producer Steve Hillage. After preparing several mixes of the album, none of which they liked, Hillage was fired, and engineer Dave Charles was brought in. Further recording was then done at the nearby Rockfield Studios.

"Crashin' In" was released as the album's lead single in December 1994. Following a tour of the United Kingdom in April 1995, "Just Lookin'" and "Bullet Comes" were released as a double A-side single in May 1995. Over the next few months, the band played at various festivals in Spain, Stockholm and the UK, including Glastonbury and T in the Park. "Just When You're Thinkin' Things Over" was released as the album's third single in August 1995, which was followed by a tour of the United States. They then toured mainland Europe prior to a UK tour at the end of the year; they went on another UK trek in early 1996, playing lesser-known locations around the country.

The Charlatans received generally favourable reviews from music critics, some of whom praised the musicianship; retrospective comments by journalists said it helped prolong the band's career. It topped the album charts in both Scotland and the UK, in addition to charting in Sweden. All three of the album's singles peaked within the top 40 in both Scotland and the UK, with "Just When You're Thinkin' Things Over" charting the highest at numbers 5 and 12, respectively. Melody Maker, NME, and Select included the album on their lists of the year's best releases, with Melody Maker going so far as to include it on their list of the best 100 albums of all time.

== Background and writing ==
The Charlatans released their third studio album, Up to Our Hips, in March 1994 through Beggars Banquet Records. It came out around the time that the Britpop and lad culture scenes began emerging. Up to Our Hips charted within the top 10 album charts in both Scotland and the United Kingdom. The band promoted the album with a tour of the United States, festivals in Brussels and the Netherlands, and a few UK shows with Gene. Further touring engagements were cancelled due to a cyst growing on bassist Martin Blunt's buttocks; the band subsequently took a break for a few weeks.

While on a week-long holiday in Costa del Sol, Spain, with their respective girlfriends, vocalist Tim Burgess and guitarist Mark Collins began a songwriting partnership. They had previously collaborated the year before, writing "Another Rider Up in Flames" for Up to Our Hips. They mapped out what ideas they had, with Collins saying that they wanted to avoid including "any downers on the [next] album". Upon returning to the UK, Collins would spend time at Burgess' residence in Chalk Farm, taking to sleeping on his floor. The pair would compose songs with a guitar and a drum machine, recording the proceedings on a four-track recorder. Collins said they purposely challenged themselves to write eight songs a week, eventually accumulating 30 songs in total.

== Recording ==
At the suggestion of Steve Hillage, the Charlatans went to record at Monnow Valley Studio in Rockfield, Monmouthshire, Wales. Hillage was enlisted to produce the album, having previously worked on Up to Our Hips, despite being annoyed that Burgess had disregarded that album as "bollocks". "Crashin' In" was among the first four songs recorded during the sessions, being started and completed within a single weekend. Between midnight and 4 a.m, the band would sit around and listen to music that one of them enjoyed; author Dominic Wills, in his book The Charlatans: The Authorised History (1999), said "each member had an ulterior motive: by bombarding the others with their own personal favourites, they could surreptitiously alter the sound of the tracks the band were presently recording". Blunt soon became aware of Burgess and Collins' fixation on country and western music, which was shifting the songs away from the funk-oriented grooves and mod sound that he preferred. Several arguments rose from this, with Blunt refusing to concede until they settled on a resolution that he liked. Burgess explained the situation as: "You come up with something that's fairly straight and then Martin puts his bit in and completely removes it". Collins also pushed American folk and rock songs onto the rest of the band.

Before Christmas 1994, Hillage made various mixes of the album for the band to listen to. They were not satisfied with the proceedings and learned that Hillage had been occupied with other recording jobs, which left them feeling annoyed that he was not committing his attention to them. They promptly fired Hillage, much to the chagrin of Burgess, who had hoped to facilitate a long-term working partnership with him after having issues trusting anyone when making their second studio album Between 10th and 11th. Collins said their label proposed that the band should produce themselves, to which he remarked, "I'm not sure if that's them being stingy bastards or whether they have total faith in us". Blunt, on the other hand, was confident about the proposal, having learned about technology from Flood when making Between 10th and 11th.

Engineer Dave Charles was selected instead, receiving high praise from Collins. They recorded the backing track to "Here Comes a Soul Saver" at The Coach House room at the nearby Rockfield Studios, which had been made over three takes and switched together from the best two of those. They attempted to mix the album at The Strongroom in London between 12 and 25 January 1995, but were not happy with the results, at the cost of £15,000. They went back to Monnow Valley, where they spent two weeks, before moving to Rockfield Studios and eventually returning to Monnow Valley, finishing mixing in early March 1995. Hillage is credited as a producer, alongside the band and Charles, for the majority of the tracks, save for "Here Comes a Soul Saver", "Just When You're Thinkin' Things Over", "Tell Everyone", and "Thank You", which were produced by the band and Charles. Hillage received sole producing credit on "Crashin' In". Charles mixed and edited all of the songs; the band helped co-mix "Crashin' In".

== Composition and lyrics ==
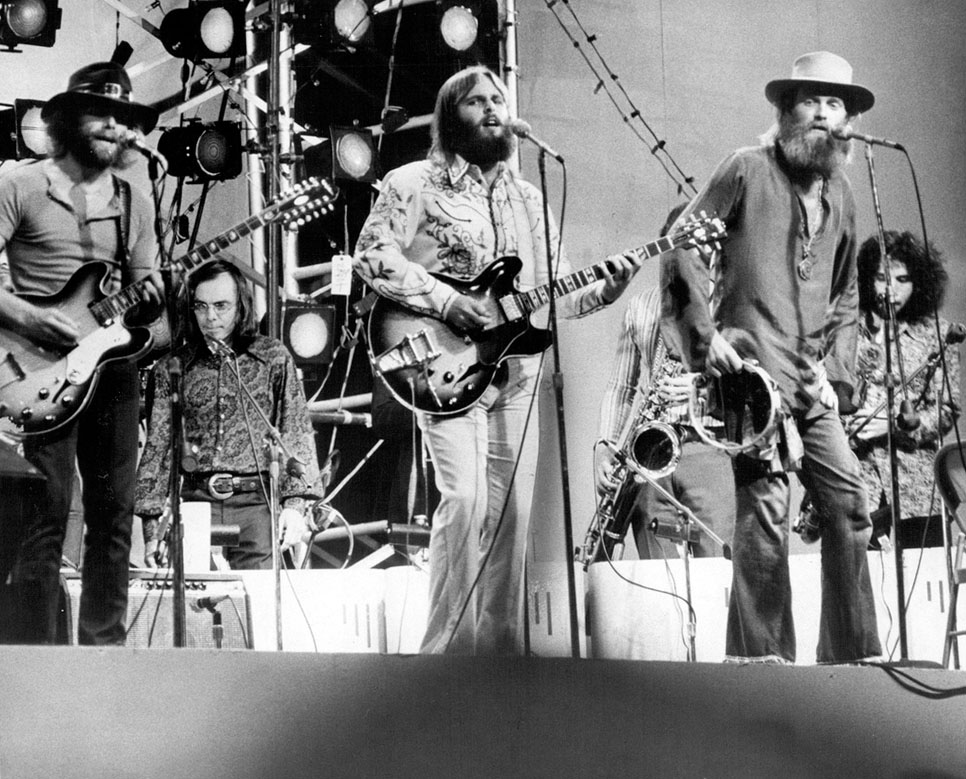
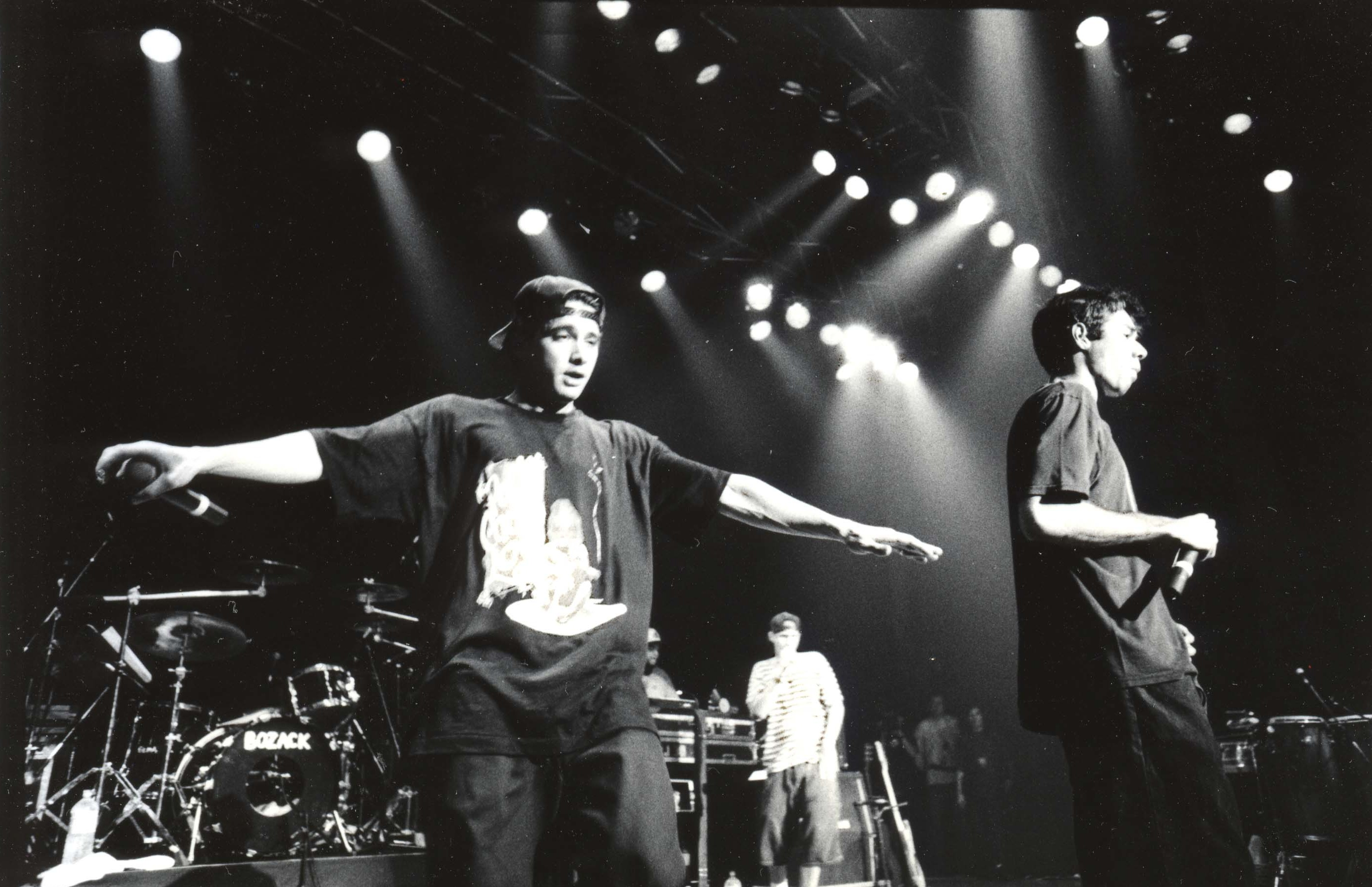
Guitarist Mark Collins said 1960s acts, such as the Beach Boys (top), and contemporary artists, like Beastie Boys (bottom), influenced the album.

=== Overview ===
Musically, the sound of The Charlatans has been described as Britpop and power pop. AllMusic reviewer Stephen Thomas Erlewine felt that the band "incorporat[ed] heavy dance elements without losing its core sound". Nude as the News co-founder Troy Carpenter said the music was a "cross between Blur and, say, Check Your Head-era Beastie Boys." Collins said it was influenced by various 1960s acts such as the Beach Boys circa Surf's Up (1971) and Holland (1973), the Beatles and the Who, as well as more contemporary acts by the likes of Beck and the Beastie Boys. Alongside this, Burgess was getting heavily into hip hop, particularly the work of Wu-Tang Clan. Wills wrote that they drew from all of their "previous influences as well as their deep knowledge of Americana".

In addition to his regular role, Burgess played distorted bass on "Tell Everyone" and "Toothache" as he felt that there was "not enough bass" on their albums. The album's title went through multiple names, including Crashin' In, Crashin' Out, Live It Like You Love It, Look at Us, Nine Acre Court, Smiling, and You Start a Riot. During the initial writing phase, Burgess referred to it as First Shag in Ages, referring to a quote by Irvine Welsh. This title appeared on vinyl versions of the album, written between the leadout grooves. Wills said the band decided to self-title it as they "finally felt themselves to be in control".

=== Tracks ===
"Nine Acre Court" came about following an evening spent clubbing in Bristol; its title referred to flats in Salford, where Collins' girlfriend lived, and he wrote some material for the album. The song's introduction was taken from a tape that drummer Jon Brookes had made of himself walking around Oxford Street in London before being stopped by members of the Jesus Army, ending with the sound of a bus turning up. Burgess did not appear on the track as he had to "entertain an A&R man [from Beggars Banquet] that everyone was trying to avoid". "Feeling Holy" existed as an instrumental that Blunt, Brookes, and keyboardist Rob Collins had written for sometime, which Burgess felt came across as akin to "Jesus Hairdo", a track from Up to Our Hips. Wills wrote that "Just Lookin'" was "concerned [with] the death of youth spirit in the UK", which Burgess attributed to Tories being in power as well as Burgess being told that he would not amount to anything during his upbringing. He wanted it to evoke "Blowin' in the Wind" (1963) by Bob Dylan, while the chorus was similar to "Bring On the Lucie (Freda Peeple)" (1973) by John Lennon. Burgess wrote the lyrics in a pub on Wardour Street in London; Mark Collins thought his guitarwork in it recalled P. P. Arnold's version of "Angel of the Morning" (1967).

"Crashin' In" discusses Burgess moving to London and attempting to get people to go on a night out, even though they had no interest in doing so. Tim Mohr of Consumable Online compared it to the work of Oasis, with its lyrics from a "mildly threatening, slightly acidic point of view". Burgess said "Bullet Comes" was inspired by Dr. John's Gumbo (1972) by Dr. John, and features a mixture of loops with off-kilter beats from Brookes. When making the song, Burgess, discussing "Here Comes a Soul Saver", said it had a country atmosphere to it, in the vein of Neil Young. He mentioned that a lot of country songs dealt with "struggle and survival, [...] trouble and joy, and that felt like what had happened to us over the years". "Just When You're Thinkin' Things Over" evoked "Ramble On" (1969) by Led Zeppelin; Brookes was unable to record drums for it as he had injured his foot during a game of football, prompting a drum track to be made out of a loop, which did not appear in the track until the halfway point. The Charlatans based the song around the title phrase as sung in "Bring On the Lucie (Freda Peeple)".

"Tell Everyone" is an acoustic ballad about Burgess' faithfulness to his girlfriend, Chloe Walsh. Collins felt it was reminiscent of Faces and used a cheap guitar for the acoustic part, as he felt his other guitar "sounded too posh". The swamp rock song "Toothache" recalled Led Zeppelin's version of "When the Levee Breaks" (1929). The song was almost left off the album, as Collins did not like his guitar playing on it until he was persuaded by Burgess. "No Fiction" evolved out of a jam session between Burgess and Collins; the pair took four months to convince Blunt it was worthy of inclusion. It discussed being immersed in life and the evolution of the band. Burgess said it was influenced by Young's After the Gold Rush (1970) and On the Beach (1974) albums. Wills said "See It Through" was an "appeal to and an anthem for all the outsiders, the misfits, the northerners, the ugly, the Scots, [and] the weirdos". The album's closing track, "Thank You", is an instrumental written by Blunt as a form of appreciation for their supporters over the years. Charles could be heard at the 14-second mark uttering the title phrase as Burgess handed him a microphone.

== Release and promotion ==
In November 1994, Burgess attended a club night hosted by Heavenly Recordings, where he came across co-founders Jeff Barrett and Martin Kelly. Kelly was surprised that "Can't Get Out of Bed", a track from Up to Our Hips, had not been a bigger success and was also astonished by the lack of press for Up to Our Hips. Up to this point, the band's PR had been handled by Savage and Best, a popular agency around the UK. After asking what that company was charging, Kelly proceeded to tell Burgess that he should let him and Barrett do their future PR, which he was offering for half the price of Savage and Best. After clearing it with the band's manager Steve Harrison and Martin Mills of Beggars Banquet Records, Heavenly became their PR agency. "Crashin' In" was released as the lead single from the album on 28 December 1994, having been held back from its intended Boxing Day date due to that being a bank holiday. It included "Back Room Window" and "Green Flashing Eyes" as its B-sides. The music video for "Crashin' In" was filmed at Monnow Valley and features the studio's cat Charlie.

Blunt, Charles, and Rob Collins travelled to Metropolis Studio in London in March 1995 to master "Bullet Comes", which had been earmarked as the next single. Three days after this, it was decided to couple "Bullet Comes" with "Just Lookin'" as a double A-side single. Following the conclusion of mixing, the band spent some time rehearsing for their upcoming touring schedule. They embarked on a tour of the UK in April 1995, with support from the Rainkings and the Bluetones; the following month, "Just Lookin'" and "Bullet Comes" were released as the joint second single on 8 May 1995. "Floor Nine" was included as its B-side. Beggars Banquet were not fond of releasing it and "Crashin' In" so far out from the album, while Burgess said the band "knew better – we were really getting back the confidence and belief we had in the first place". The music video for "Just Lookin'" was filmed outside the GLC building, close to the River Thames.

The band made six festival appearances over the subsequent four months, including Glastonbury, Brighton, Phoenix, and T in the Park in the UK, Benicàssim in Spain, and Waterfestival Stockholm. "Just When You're Thinkin' Things Over" was released as the album's final single on 7 August 1995. The music video, which was directed by Lindy Heymann, shows the band wearing gangster clothing, influenced by the 1970 film Performance. The CD version included "Frinck", "Your Skies Are Mine", and a remix of "Toothache" as the B-sides, while the 12-inch version swapped "Your Skies Are Mine" for a remix of "Nine Acre Court". "Just When You're Thinkin' Things Over" was promoted with an appearance on Top of the Pops and a Mark Radcliffe radio session where they performed it alongside "Crashin' In", "Just Lookin'", and "Here Comes a Soul Saver". The Charlatans was released on 28 August 1995.

Soon after this, the band embarked on a tour of the US, which was shortened due to juice manufacturer Ocean Spray pulling their sponsorship because of Collins' past criminal record. The full version of the tour would have seen them perform in 1,500 to 5,000 capacity venues in cities they would not have usually played, which is where the Ocean Spray promotion would have helped. They were supported by Britpop band Menswear for the trek; during this time, the Britpop movement had not conquered the US, with Pulp and Supergrass having toured the country previously and Blur touring at the same time as the Charlatans. After ten shows, the Charlatans toured mainland Europe, with a focus on Germany in particular. Upon returning to the UK, they toured in November 1995 with support from Mansun, becoming their longest trek in the country. In early 1996, they toured smaller, lesser-known places in the UK for the type of fan that would typically have to travel to see them.

=== Reissues and related releases ===
The Charlatans was re-pressed on vinyl in 2021. "Just Lookin'", "Crashin' In", "Here Comes a Soul Saver", and "Just When You're Thinkin' Things Over" were included on the band's first compilation album, Melting Pot (1998). "Just When You're Thinkin' Things Over" was featured on their third and fifth compilation albums, Forever: The Singles (2006) and A Head Full of Ideas (2021). As part of the 2019 Record Store Day event, "Just Lookin'", "Crashin' In", "Bullet Comes", and "Just When You're Thinkin' Things Over" were released as part of the seven-inch vinyl box set Everything Changed (2019). A remix EP, under the name The Charlatans UK V. The Chemical Brothers, was released in the US in 1995, featuring remixes of "Toothache" and "Nine Acre Court" done by the Chemical Brothers. This EP was re-pressed on vinyl to coincide with the 2020 Record Store Day event, which included a remix of "Patrol", a song originally from Up to Our Hips, as an additional track.

== Reception ==
Professional ratings
Review scores
Source	Rating
AllMusic	4/5 stars
Alternative Rock	8/10
Entertainment Weekly	B
The Guardian	4/5 stars
NME	6/10
The Rolling Stone Album Guide	3.5/5 stars

The Charlatans was met with generally favourable reviews from music critics. Erlewine saw it as The Charlatans' "most ambitious, focused, and successful album", though it "relies too heavily on trippy dance instrumentals" at times. David N. Meyer of Entertainment Weekly said it was "energetic, sincere, and a bit thin-voiced [...] the Black Crowes with hipper references". NME writer Keith Cameron said the album "feels unequivocally like a statement of intent", adding that with the various influences, the band was capable of "absorbing the sensibility wholesale, while leaving the incriminating specifics alone".

Wills felt that the band were "really living up to their potential of that earlier Manchester melting pot, truly and thrillingly exploring the possibilities" of their sound. Robb said it was "overflowing" with confidence, being the release where they "dropped all the disguises and came out as themselves, setting the blueprint for their own totally individual sound". Author Susan Wilson, in her book The Charlatans – Northwich Country Boys (1997), said the album "would completely revive their career, putting them back on the map as one of Britain's best bands of the decade". Carpenter said the album "remained a fan favorite, a disc you could always come back to to remind you why this band is here to stay." Author Dave Thompson, in his book Alternative Rock (2000), wrote that the album "continues precisely where Hips left off, only now the group's self-confidence comes into play as well."

The Charlatans topped the album charts in both Scotland and the UK and peaked at number 28 in Sweden. It appeared at number 87 on the UK's year-end album chart and was later certified gold there by the British Phonographic Industry. "Crashin' In" charted at number 26 in Scotland and number 31 in the UK. "Just Lookin'"/"Bullet Comes" charted at number 18 in Scotland and number 32 in the UK. "Just When You're Thinkin' Things Over" charted at number five in Scotland; it became their highest-charting single in the UK since "Then" in 1990, peaking at number 12. Wills theorised that the song would have performed better if it had not been released the same week as the chart battle between Blur and Oasis. Select ranked the album at number 17 on its list of the year's best releases.

== Track listing ==
All songs written by Martin Blunt, Jon Brookes, Tim Burgess, Mark Collins, and Rob Collins.

The vinyl and Japanese releases of the album included "Chemical Risk (Toothache Mix)" as a bonus track, placed after "Bullet Comes" on the vinyl version.

The Charlatans track listing
No.	Title	Producer	Length
1.	"Nine Acre Court"	The Charlatans; Dave Charles; Steve Hillage	3:45
2.	"Feeling Holy"	The Charlatans; Charles; Hillage	5:16
3.	"Just Lookin'"	The Charlatans; Charles; Hillage	3:49
4.	"Crashin' In"	Hillage	5:02
5.	"Bullet Comes"	The Charlatans; Charles; Hillage	5:25
6.	"Here Comes a Soul Saver"	The Charlatans; Charles	3:23
7.	"Just When You're Thinkin' Things Over"	The Charlatans; Charles	4:51
8.	"Tell Everyone"	The Charlatans; Charles	3:32
9.	"Toothache"	The Charlatans; Charles; Hillage	5:16
10.	"No Fiction"	The Charlatans; Charles; Hillage	3:58
11.	"See It Through"	The Charlatans; Charles; Hillage	4:08
12.	"Thank You"	The Charlatans; Charles	3:34

== Personnel ==
Personnel per booklet, except where noted.

The Charlatans

- Tim Burgess – lead vocals, bass (tracks 8 and 9)
- Martin Blunt – bass
- Mark Collins – guitar
- Rob Collins – D6, clavinet, Hammond organ, Wurlitzer, piano, backing vocals
- Jon Brookes – drums

Additional musicians

- Steve Hillage – programming
- Dave Charles – percussion

Production and design

- The Charlatans – producer (all except track 4), mixing (track 4)
- Dave Charles – producer (all except track 4), mixing, engineer, editing
- Steve Hillage – producer (all except tracks 6–8 and 12)

== Charts ==
=== Weekly charts ===
Chart performance for The Charlatans
Chart (1995)	Peak position
Australian Albums (ARIA)	137
Scottish Albums (Official Charts)	1
Swedish Albums (Sverigetopplistan)	28
UK Albums (Official Charts)	1

=== Year-end charts ===
Year-end chart performance for The Charlatans
Chart (1995)	Position
UK Albums (OCC)	87

== Certifications ==
Certifications for The Charlatans
Region	Certification	Certified units/sales
United Kingdom (BPI)	Gold	100,000^{^}
^{^} Shipments figures based on certification alone.
