= Tellin' Stories =

Studio album by the Charlatans
- Released: 21 April 1997
- Recorded: Mid-1996 – early 1997
- Studios: Rockfield, Rockfield, Monmouthshire; Monnow Valley, Rockfield, Monmouthshire
- Genres: Britpop; hip hop soul; rock
- Length: 46:56
- Label: Beggars Banquet
- Producers: The Charlatans; Dave Charles; Ric Peet

The Charlatans chronology
The Charlatans (1995)	Tellin' Stories (1997)	Melting Pot (1998)

Singles from Tellin' Stories
- 1. "One to Another" Released: 26 August 1996; 2. "North Country Boy" Released: 24 March 1997; 3. "How High" Released: 9 June 1997; 4. "Tellin' Stories" Released: 20 October 1997

Tellin' Stories is the fifth studio album by the British rock band the Charlatans, released on 21 April 1997 through Beggars Banquet Records. After wrapping up touring in support of their 1995 self-titled fourth album in early 1996, vocalist Tim Burgess and guitarist Mark Collins went to a cottage near Lake Windermere to write material. Shortly after this, they did a test recording session at Rockfield in Rockfield, Monmouthshire, before main sessions were underway from Easter 1996 at the nearby Monnow Valley Studio with the band, engineer Dave Charles, and engineer Ric Peet acting as producers. Partway through recording, keyboardist Rob Collins was killed in a car crash. The band drafted in Martin Duffy of Primal Scream to help finish the album, concluding in early 1997. Tellin' Stories is a Britpop, hip hop soul, and rock album that has been compared to the work of Patti Smith and Neil Young.

Following a support slot for Oasis at Knebworth, "One to Another" was released as the lead single from Tellin' Stories in August 1996. Prior to a tour of the United Kingdom, which saw the introduction of keyboardist Tony Rogers, "North Country Boy" was released as the album's second single in March 1997. The Charlatans went on a tour of the United States, coinciding with the release of the album's third single, "How High", in June 1997. After returning to the UK, they played two festivals, T in the Park and Phoenix, and then some shows in Japan. Another US tour followed; "Tellin' Stories" was released as the album's fourth single in October 1997, which was promoted with a UK tour to end the year.

Tellin' Stories received generally favourable reviews from music critics, some of whom highlighted the mix of genres and many highlighting Collins' death over the band's maturity. It topped the album charts in both Scotland and the UK, in addition to charting in Norway and Sweden. All four of the album's singles peaked within the top 40 in both Scotland and the UK, with "One to Another" charting the highest at numbers one and three, respectively. "North Country Boy" was also number one in Scotland. Melody Maker, NME, and Vox included the album on their lists of the year's best releases, while Q included it on their list of the 100 best albums from the 1990s. It was certified platinum in the UK; both "One to Another" and "North Country Boy" have since been certified silver in the same country.

== Background and writing ==
The Charlatans released their self-titled fourth studio album in August 1995 through Beggars Banquet Records. It topped the album charts in both Scotland and the United Kingdom; out of its three singles, "Just When You're Thinkin' Things Over" was the most successful, reaching number five in Scotland and number 12 in the UK. It was promoted with a tour of the United States, a trek across mainland Europe, and two UK stints, leading into early 1996. Following this, they spent time at home writing material for their next album. Guitarist Mark Collins asked the band's management to locate a remote part of the Lake District where he and vocalist Tim Burgess could work on ideas.

Burgess and Collins subsequently stayed at a cottage close to Lake Windermere, where they wrote songs over two weeks. They had taken with them an acoustic guitar, a drum machine, a bass, an eight-track recorder, a record player, and various albums. Burgess listened to the various works of Bob Dylan and Wu-Tang Clan, analysing their use of vocal rhythms. Upon returning home, the pair learned that bassist Martin Blunt, drummer Jon Brookes, and keyboardist Rob Collins had completed three songs. "North Country Boy", "One to Another", "How High" and "Only Teethin'" were partly recorded at Rockfield Studios, located in Rockfield, Monmouthshire, as a test session.

== Production and Collins' death ==
Around Easter 1996, the Charlatans travelled to Monnow Valley Studio, also located in Rockfield, Monmouthshire, where they would record their next release. The sessions initially progressed slowly until they started working on "One to Another", which was quickly earmarked as a single. All of the tracks were produced by the band and Dave Charles, except "Area 51" by the band, Charles, and Ric Peet of Candy Flip, and "Rob's Theme" by the band and Peet. Charles also engineered the sessions with assistant Phil Ault. Peet was employed as Collins' personal engineer as he worked on a different schedule from the rest of the band, which resulted in him recording whenever he was in the mood. Burgess said songs that they worked on during the daytime would begin to "get butchered in the early hours" by Collins. He would intentionally ruin tracks that he did not like and songs he did like due to being intoxicated. Burgess had an argument with Rob Collins and confided to Mark Collins that he wished to kick Rob Collins out of the band.

On 22 July 1996, Rob Collins was killed in a car crash. Brookes had spoken to Collins earlier in the day, noting that he sounded out of character, "like he was in a semi-coma or something." The pair discussed ideas that Collins had, while Brookes mentioned to him that some of his parts recorded up to that point were "wishy-washy", which annoyed Collins. They had visited a pub that evening, where Burgess thought Collins acted quieter than usual. Burgess returned to the studio to record vocals. The other members left the pub an hour later, with Mark Collins leaving in one car with a friend, while Peet and Rob Collins left in the latter's car. Mark Collins and his friend had noticed Rob Collins' car following behind them before the headlights disappeared. Unbeknownst to them, Rob Collins had lost control of his car after hitting a kerb, causing his car to slide across the road, go through a hedge, and roll over a bank. As he was not wearing a seatbelt, Collins was ejected from the car; he managed to stand up prior to collapsing. He subsequently died in an ambulance travelling to the hospital in Abergavenny, while Peet had minor injuries. The coroner said Collins had more than double the blood alcohol level in his system.

Manager Steve Harrison informed Brookes of the situation over a phone call in the early hours of the morning, while Burgess and Mark Collins had gone to the studio unaware of it. A friend of the pair had told them that Rob Collins had been in an accident; they were visited by the police shortly afterwards, who had informed them that Collins was in the hospital. Mark Collins had been told by a nurse of what had happened and told Burgess, leaving them both distraught. At the urging of Rob Collins' father, the band decided to continue after a meeting at Harrison's place, enlisting Martin Duffy of Primal Scream to fill Collins' role. Duffy was available as Primal Scream was going through a hiatus. Duffy had been suggested by their frontman, Bobby Gillespie, while Burgess had been a fan of him since his work with Felt and had met him previously at a Charlatans gig. MTV reported that the album was 75% complete, while Wills estimated it to be 50%. After two weeks of working with the Charlatans, Duffy offered to help complete it. Aware that progress on the album had stalled, the band re-focused themselves to finish it, with sessions wrapping in early 1997.

Aside from what was already completed, Collins recorded various parts, some of which they used and others that were left unused. Burgess explained that Collins had left "bagpipes all over ['You're a Big Girl Now'] or French harmonium or something" as he did not like the track and had "ruined the track 'Tellin' Stories', though he left us with a good riff. Duffy and the band worked well together, with him adding parts to various tracks." He would playback Collins' parts and then perform his own parts, letting the band choose whichever they preferred. Burgess said the liner notes did not mention which songs Collins or Duffy had individually played on out of respect for Collins, but asserted that Duffy added parts to several songs that Collins had already contributed to. In a series of tweets surrounding a listening party for the album, Burgess and Mark Collins revealed that Duffy played on "With No Shoes", "Tellin' Stories", "You're a Big Girl Now", and "Get On It".

Loops on "With No Shoes" were supplied by Tom Rowlands of the Chemical Brothers, Richard March of Bentley Rhythm Ace, and Collins. The Charlatans had first worked with the Chemical Brothers when they remixed "Patrol", a song originally from their third studio album Up to Our Hips (1994). Rowlands visited the Quadrangle room at Rockfield Studios, using a sampler, sequencer, and synthesiser to add his parts, altering the sound of "Tellin' Stories", "Only Teethin'", and "One to Another". For "With No Shoes", Burgess said Rowlands felt that the song's rhythm was not right, ultimately correcting it by adding its opening beats. "Tellin' Stories" also featured a string loop by Martin Reilly. Burgess said they felt the string part did not work within the track, and Rowlands was brought in to rework it at Monnow Valley Studio. In addition to this, Charles provided percussion throughout the album's songs. The album was mixed at Monnow Valley Studio, bar Rowlands' work on "One to Another", which was mixed in London by Ed Simons of the Chemical Brothers and Steve "Dub" Walton.

== Composition and lyrics ==
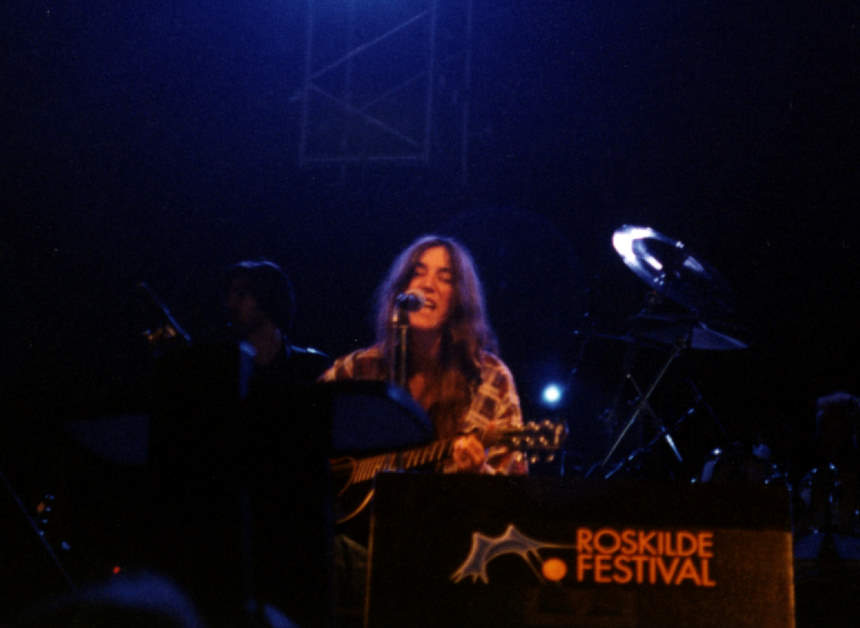
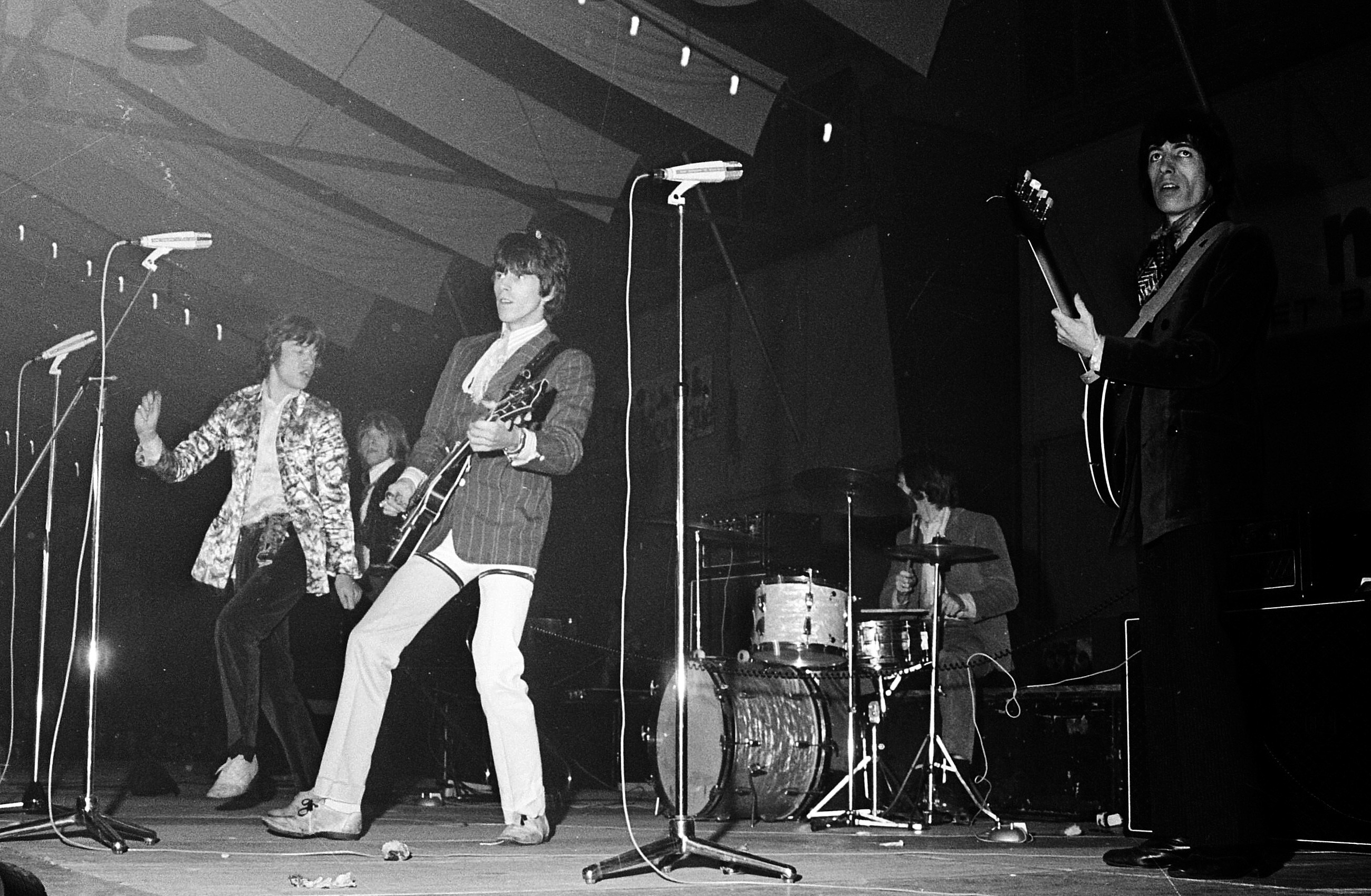
Critics drew comparisons between Tellin' Stories and the work of Patti Smith (top) and the Rolling Stones (bottom).

=== Overview ===
Musically, the sound of Tellin' Stories has been described as Britpop,hip hop soul and rock. Blunt described it as a mix between Searching for the Young Soul Rebels (1980) by Dexys Midnight Runners and Let It Bleed (1969) by the Rolling Stones. Critics compared it to Let It Bleed, as well as Tonight's the Night (1975) by Neil Young and Gone Again (1996) by Patti Smith. MTV's Mitch Myers said the band avoided the "overt Beatle pop-isms" of their contemporaries Blur and Oasis, instead opting to do a "bluesier, more sultry take on the British Invasion." Journalist John Robb, in his biography of the Charlatans The Charlatans: We Are Rock (1998) referred to it as "Mark Collins' album" as the music was "getting guitar orientated, built around class roc & roll riffs." Burgess shared a similar sentiment, saying that Rob Collins' death gave them the "progression to go with the guitar" as the main instrument; Myers also noted more of an emphasis on guitars. Discussing the title, Burgess said they were "going through an unexplained phase of dropping 'g's".

Author Susan Wilson, in her book The Charlatans – Northwich Country Boys (1997), said Burgess' words were "very obviously about emotions, relationships, and of course Rob [Collins]", noting that his ex-girlfriend, who had left him at the start of recording, was an influence. Biographer Dominic Wills, in his book The Charlatans: The Authorised History (1999), expanded on this, saying that Burgess' lyrics "took on a religious feel as he began to treat life as not just a thrill-packed teenage pursuit but as a sometimes painful but always rewarding learning process leading (hopefully) to redemption." Burgess had become accustomed to more literate songwriters, such as Dylan, Kevin Rowland of Dexys Midnight Runners, and Young. In addition to this, he made pop culture references to The Aristocats (1970), Kung Fu, and The Simpsons. Burgess said the songs were credited to the whole band, despite Collins not having contributed to two of them prior to his death.

=== Tracks ===
Discussing the opening song "With No Shoes", Burgess said he and Mark Collins wanted to make something between Solid Air (1973) by John Martyn, which was owned by the former, and Smash Hits (1968) by the Jimi Hendrix Experience, which was owned by the latter. The song's title was taken from Kung Fu, where the character Kwai Chang Caine refrained from wearing shoes. "North Country Boy" discusses a man attempting to cheer himself up; Burgess said this person was himself, explaining that he remade "Girl from the North Country" (1963) by Dylan from a man's perspective. For it, Burgess said he and Collins tried to mix the work of the Rolling Stones and Simon & Garfunkel. "Tellin' Stories" was initially named "Laughing Gravy", a reference to Laurel and Hardy, with some of the lyrics being influenced by John Wesley Harding (1967) by Dylan. It is a neo-psychedelia song that evokes This Is the Sea (1985)-era the Waterboys. Rob Collins did not like the initial version of the song done at Windermere, suggesting they rework the melody, which eventually happened. This alteration prompted Burgess to re-do the lyrics. Collins also proposed adding a drum-and-guitar break between each verse and chorus section. Rowlands' contribution to the track saw the addition of a countdown during the introduction; it was originally from 1 to 10, but was edited to only include 1, 2, and 9.

"One to Another" is about a boy attempting to stop his relationship from disintegrating. Wills wrote that it had an aggressive Led Zeppelin-like guitar riff that was "underpinned by Rob Collins' Stonesy electric piano, and a Bomb the Bass beat". He added that while it featured contributions from Rowlands, it was the culmination of the technical skills they had learned since working with Flood some years prior. Rowlands added the sound of clocks and dinosaurs, as well as running Mark Collins' guitar through a synthesizer, multi-tracking Rob Collins' digital piano, and adding a regular piano on top of that. Wills said for "You're a Big Girl Now", they pushed drawing pins into the pads of the piano to give it an "authentic bar-room feel". It originally started as an up-tempo indie rock song that they eventually stripped down, edited, and saw the inclusion of Mark Collins' acoustic guitar. Burgess said Duffy gave the song a tinge of Chas & Dave. For its title, he wanted something similar to "Big Girl Now", the name of separate songs by Dylan and the Lovin' Spoonful.

Though "How Can You Leave Us" was initially written by Burgess about a girl, some lyrics were changed after Rob Collins' death. Blunt and Collins had styled the chorus section after the work of Faces. Burgess said he picked the title after it had been yelled at him by Robin Turner, the A&R representative for Heavenly Records, during a Blur gig. Burgess said that "Area 51" was planned from the offset to be a B-side, though after Collins' death, "we felt this song in particular really showcased Rob's skills" as a keyboardist. Burgess said the song originated with Collins, who went out clubbing in Bristol, but gave it its title after he and Duffy saw documentaries on Roswell. He mentioned that they went with this name because he thought it sounded like "aliens playing the Hammond organ, sounds like it comes from outer space", and acknowledged that Collins may have been influenced by the Bristol sound of trip hop, namely Massive Attack and Tricky. In "How High", Burgess sings from the perspective of a Pied Piper-like persona, influencing their younger audience. When writing it, Burgess said he wanted it to carry a "punch of the Wu-Tang Clan but with the playfulness of De La Soul." Its title was taken from a 1995 song of the same name by Method Man & Redman; Mark Collins made his vocal debut on the song.

With "Only Teethin'", Burgess and Collins wanted to make a song that mixed together "Barstool Blues" (1975) by Young, "Sgt. Pepper's Lonely Hearts Club Band (reprise)" by the Beatles, and Don't Stand Me Down (1985) by Dexys Midnight Runners. Burgess said the lyrics were influenced by the "goings on in my version of London – the city had become my city"; the drum pattern in it was taken from "Inner City Blues (Make Me Wanna Holler)" (1971) by Marvin Gaye, evoking the sound of Motown. "Get On It" details the story of people travelling to work, fantasising about the weekend, and thinking about the weather. NME writer Roger Morton said the track turned the atmosphere of "Like a Rolling Stone" (1965) by Dylan into a track of "reassurance - [...] while the band stretches the tune into a final epic high". The keyboard parts in the track were reminiscent of those heard throughout Highway 61 Revisited (1965) by Dylan. The album's closing track, "Rob's Theme", is an instrumental that evolved out of a tape that Rob Collins' aunt recorded when he was three years old. Burgess had assumed that it was useless until the band heard it after Collins' death, surprised to learn that he had laid down a rough backing track.

== Release ==
=== First two singles and MCA signing ===
The Charlatans cancelled a supporting slot for Oasis at Loch Lomond in Scotland, but supported them at their show in Knebworth with Duffy in tow. Here, they debuted "One to Another" and "North Country Boy", which were soon followed by an appearance at V Festival in Chelmsford. Around this time, "One to Another" was released as the album's lead single on 26 August 1996, with "Two of Us" and "Reputation" as the B-sides. The music video for "One to Another" had been filmed a week prior to Collins' death. Nearing the end of the recording process, the band travelled to London with Harrison to sign a deal with MCA Records and its parent company, Universal Music Group, in the US for £1 million, though they remained with Beggars Banquet in the UK. Sometime prior to this, Burgess was hanging out with John Niven from London Recordings, who was interested in signing the band. Niven offered them a signing opportunity with related label Decca Records, though Burgess wanted to go with Heavenly Recordings, who had been doing the band's press duties up to this point. Burgess and Mark Collins both liked what Niven was offering; in hindsight, Burgess said Heavenly would not have had the resources to aid them.

As the members felt they were ready to move on from Beggars Banquet, they went with MCA after being courted by their A&R representative, John Walsh. Collins explained that they felt they could benefit from the "bigger push of a major label", adding that MCA seemed to be "on our wavelength" more so than other labels. "North Country Boy" was released as the second single from the album on 24 March 1997, with "Area 51" and "Don't Need a Gun" as the B-sides. It was available digitally from Cerberus Digital Jukebox, an early digital retailer. For the music video, Beggars Banquet had suggested Blackpool for its illuminations but then proposed Southend-on-Sea. The band were adamant about filming in New York City, as Burgess said, for its atmosphere similar to the films Mean Streets (1973) and Midnight Cowboy (1969); the majority of the budget was spent on flights and hotel rooms. The finished video, which was directed by Lindy Heymann, shows the band in front of neon signs and travelling around in taxis.

=== Album promotion and last two singles ===
Tellin' Stories was released through Beggars Banquet Records on 21 April 1997. The US edition, which was released through MCA Records and featured "Title Fight" and "Two of Us" as part of the track listing before "Rob's Theme", was originally planned for July 1997 but was moved up to 17 June 1997. The album's sleeve includes a dedication to Rob Collins. The Charlatans rehearsed for their upcoming tours at Stanbridge Farm, a barn that had been converted into a studio, close to Brighton. They embarked on a tour of the UK that ran into May 1997, with support from Bentley Rhythm Ace; the London show saw the debut of Tony Rogers from Jobe, the Charlatans new full-time keyboardist. Jobe had previously played for a club run by Tim Ison; Blunt had heard of Rogers before and contacted Ison about gauging Rogers' interest in joining the Charlatans. Rogers had seen them perform twice before, once when they had a different frontman, and then in 1995. After an hour-long phone call talking about music and an audition, Rogers was contacted by Brookes, who formally invited him to join them. Prior to this, it was suggested that Duffy could have been made a member of the band due to the inactivity of Primal Scream, but around this time, that band started working again.

In June 1997, the Charlatans embarked on a tour of the US, which coincided with the release of "One to Another" remixes by MCA Records. In addition to this, the album version was issued to mainstream and modern rock radio stations that same month across the US. MCA's vice president of product management, Robbie Snow, had previously worked with the band during their time at RCA Records earlier in the decade. Similar to their initial rise in popularity at the start of the 1990s with the Manchester sound, he felt that the band could ride the popularity of rave acts such as the Chemical Brothers and the Prodigy. While on the US West Coast, they filmed a music video for "How High" in a drainage basin in Los Angeles, California. Heymann, who also directed it, initially employed a drone for the shooting, which was swapped for a crow in the final version of the video as a homage to Collins. "How High" was released as the third single from the album on 9 June 1997, with "Down with the Mook" and "Title Fight" as the B-sides. "Title Fight" was in the running to appear on the album but was left unfinished at the time. Upon returning to the UK, the band appeared at the T in the Park and Phoenix Festivals and then played some shows in Japan. In September 1997, they went on a second tour of the US; coinciding with this, "How High" was issued to modern rock radio stations. "Tellin' Stories" was released as the fourth single from the album on 20 October 1997, with "Keep It to Yourself", "Clean Up Kid", and a live version of "Thank You", a track from The Charlatans, recorded at Phoenix Festival as the B-sides. The music video for "Tellin' Stories" consisted of live footage from the Phoenix Festival. It was promoted with another tour of the UK to end the year.

=== Reissues and related releases ===
"One to Another" and "North Country Boy" were included on the band's first compilation album, Melting Pot (1998). "One to Another", "North Country Boy", "How High", and "Tellin' Stories" were featured on their third and fifth compilation albums, Forever: The Singles (2006) and A Head Full of Ideas (2021). As part of the 2019 Record Store Day event, "One to Another", "North Country Boy", "How High", and "Tellin' Stories" were released as part of the seven-inch vinyl box set Everything Changed (2019). In 2012, Beggars Banquet Records released a two-disc edition of the album that included B-sides and an early version of "Don't Need a Gun". Coinciding with this, Burgess released an autobiography of the same name, and the band played a few shows where they performed the album in its entirety. Burgess said they decided to do the shows by playing similar ones for their debut studio album, Some Friendly (1990), in 2010. The London date was released as a two-disc live album through Concert Live.

In 2013, a documentary on the making of the album titled Mountain Picnic Blues (The Making of Tellin' Stories) was released on DVD, which also included one of the 2012 performances as a bonus. It was titled after a lyric in "With No Shoes"; after initially being scheduled for March 2013, the DVD was released in May 2013. It was promoted with film screenings in London and Manchester. Directed by Chris Hall and Mike Kerry, the documentary features Blunt, Burgess, Brookes, and Mark Collins individually, with additional interviews from Heavenly PR agent Jeff Barrett, Duffy, and photographer Tom Sheehan. Opening with an abbreviated summary of their history from the 1980s to 1996, the participants give anecdotes about the album's creation, Rob Collins' death, their Knebworth performance, and the album's music videos. Production on the documentary started after Hall's company, Start Productions, had the head of the band's 2012 celebratory performances. Mark Collins said they approved of the project, provided they had no financial investment in it. The members had liked the documentaries on Julian Cope, Mott the Hoople, and Shack that the company had previously made.

== Critical reception ==
Professional ratings
Review scores
Source	Rating
AllMusic	4.5/5 stars
The Encyclopedia of Popular Music	5/5 stars
Entertainment Weekly	B
The Guardian	3/5 stars
NME	8/10
Q	4/5 stars
Rolling Stone	4/5 stars
The Rolling Stone Album Guide	4/5 stars
Uncut	4/5 stars

Describing the critical reception, Wills said: "Where The Charlatans had been treated as an acceptable semi-comeback, this album was considered to be the real deal." He added that various comparisons were made to the mix of genres found here as well as to acts from the 1960s, with a heavy focus on the Charlatans' "survival rather than the reasons for it", with Collins' death obfuscating the band's musical growth.

Robb felt that there were "no dips in the album's quality" compared to past releases, as the band showed that they were "full-on, strident, confident in [their] own strengths." Tom Lanham of Entertainment Weekly wrote that the band "confront[ed] death [...] with grace, dignity, and new creative commitment" on the album. Myers thought that they made a "durable album that is a fitting tribute" to Rob Collins, adding that it "sounds cohesive, and the band appears more unified than ever". Steve Taylor, in his book The A to X of Alternative Music (2006), said the band had a "focus and emotional depth" that had been lacking from prior releases.

Rolling Stone writer Jason Cohen said the band "scramble up industrial hip-hop soul with spirited, melodic '60s-rock influences, but they never let their postmodernism detract from the base simplicity of well-crafted songs and unabashed rockin'". Morton felt that the band had "push[ed] their ebullience to breaking point" as a "flame of resilience burns throughout the album." He said that while Burgess' "streams of hope'n'hurt lyrics are still those of a confused kid pouring out his heart," they "leap ten feet over cynicism" when anchored by Mark Collins' guitarwork. Taylor praised Burgess' lyrics for being "more understated and less cartoon[ish]" than contemporaries Black Grape. Tim Kennedy of Consumable Online was impressed that the lyrics were "no longer childish", as Burgess now "frequently relies on fairly hackneyed good-time clichés from the sixties."

== Commercial performance and accolades ==
Tellin' Stories reached the top spot of the album charts both in Scotland and the UK. It sold 70,000 copies in its first week of release, stopping In It for the Money by Supergrass from reaching the top spot. Wills theorised that the cassette edition, which had been discounted to £4.99, helped. Tellin' Stories also reached number 35 in Sweden and number 37 in Norway. The British Phonographic Industry in the UK certified it gold in the month of its release, before subsequently reaching platinum status in January 1998. By 1999, it had sold 100,000 copies in Japan, and as of January 2022, 344,000 copies had been sold in the UK.

"One to Another" charted at number 1 in Scotland, number 3 in the UK, number 25 in Ireland, and number 59 in Sweden. It was certified silver in the UK in 2018. "North Country Boy" charted at number one in Scotland and number four in the UK. It was certified silver in the UK in 2023. "How High" charted at number three in Scotland and number six in the UK. "Tellin' Stories" charted at number 9 in Scotland and number 16 in the UK.

Pitchfork ranked the record at number 29 in its list of the top 50 best Britpop releases. The album was also included in the book 1001 Albums You Must Hear Before You Die. "One to Another" won Single of the Decade at the Loaded Awards, to which Burgess remarked, "I would have chosen something else. 'Tellin' Stories' probably".

== Track listing ==
All tracks written by Martin Blunt, Jon Brookes, Tim Burgess, Mark Collins, and Rob Collins.

Tellin' Stories track listing
No.	Title	Producer	Length
1.	"With No Shoes"	The Charlatans; Dave Charles	4:42
2.	"North Country Boy"	The Charlatans; Charles	4:04
3.	"Tellin' Stories"	The Charlatans; Charles	5:13
4.	"One to Another"	The Charlatans; Charles	4:29
5.	"You're a Big Girl Now"	The Charlatans; Charles	2:49
6.	"How Can You Leave Us"	The Charlatans; Charles	3:45
7.	"Area 51"	The Charlatans; Ric Peet	3:36
8.	"How High"	The Charlatans; Charles	3:05
9.	"Only Teethin'"	The Charlatans; Charles	5:19
10.	"Get on It"	The Charlatans; Charles	5:56
11.	"Rob's Theme"	The Charlatans; Charles; Peet	3:54

== Personnel ==
Personnel per booklet, except where noted.

The Charlatans

- Jon Brookes – drums
- Mark Collins – guitar, loops (track 1)
- Martin Blunt – bass
- Tim Burgess – lead vocals
- Rob Collins – keyboards, backing vocals

Additional musicians

- Martin Duffy – keyboards
- Dave Charles – percussion
- Tom Rowlands – loops (tracks 1, 3 and 4)
- Richard March – loops (track 1)
- Martin Reilly – string loop (track 3)

Production and design

- The Charlatans – producer
- Dave Charles – producer (all except track 7), engineer
- Ric Peet – producer (tracks 7 and 11), engineer
- Phil Ault – assistant engineer
- Tom Sheehan – photography
- Negativespace – design

== Charts ==
=== Weekly charts ===
Chart performance for Tellin' Stories
Chart (1997)	Peak position
Australian Albums (ARIA)	106
Norwegian Albums (VG-lista)	37
Scottish Albums (Official Charts)	1
Swedish Albums (Sverigetopplistan)	35
UK Albums (Official Charts)	1

=== Year-end charts ===
Year-end chart performance for Tellin' Stories
Chart (1997)	Position
UK Albums (OCC)	39

== Certifications ==
Certifications for Tellin' Stories
Region	Certification	Certified units/sales
United Kingdom (BPI)	Platinum	300,000^{^}
^{^} Shipments figures based on certification alone.

== See also ==
- Everything Must Go – the 1996 album by Manic Street Preachers, which had similar success after the absence of one of their members
