= Me. In Time =

Single by The Charlatans
- Released: 4 November 1991
- Recorded: 1991
- Genre: Madchester
- Length: 3:27
- Label: Situation Two
- Songwriters: Blunt, Brookes, Burgess, R. Collins and M. Collins;
- Producer: Hugh Jones

The Charlatans singles chronology
"Over Rising" (1991)	"Me. In Time" (1991)	"Weirdo" (1992)

"Me. In Time" is a single by the English alternative rock band The Charlatans, released in November 1991. "Me. In Time" is the first Charlatans single to feature the contribution of Mark Collins, who replaced John Baker as the band's guitarist in mid-1991.

"Me. In Time" was never featured on any studio album, and was omitted from both of the Charlatans' subsequent greatest hits compilations, making it an extremely sought after song for fans. It does, however, appear on the band's DVD compilation Just Lookin' 1990–1997.

Reaching #28 in the UK Singles Chart, the single fared somewhat better in Ireland, peaking at #12 to give the group their fourth (and to date final) Irish top 20 hit.

One of the single's B-sides, "Subtitle" was featured on The Charlatans' second studio album Between 10th and 11th, and later appeared on the DVD compilation Just Lookin' 1990–1997 as the disc's menu screen accompaniment music. A Live version of "Me.In Time" was released on the live album Some Friendly – 20th Anniversary Concerts in 2010.

== Track listing ==
All tracks written by Blunt, Brookes, Burgess, R. Collins and M. Collins; except where noted.

7"

1. "Me. In Time" – 3:27
2. "Occupation H. Monster" (Blunt, Brookes, Burgess, R. Collins) – 4:20

12" and CD

1. "Me. In Time" – 3:27
2. "Occupation H. Monster" (Blunt, Brookes, Burgess, R. Collins) – 4:20
3. "Subtitle – 4:29
