= Up to Our Hips =

Studio album by the Charlatans
- Released: 21 March 1994
- Recorded: 1993
- Studio: Monnow Valley, Monmouth; The Mill, Cookham, Berkshire
- Genre: Funk rock; Britpop
- Length: 44:57
- Label: Beggars Banquet
- Producer: Steve Hillage; Dave Charles; The Charlatans

The Charlatans chronology
Between 10th and 11th (1992)	Up to Our Hips (1994)	The Charlatans (1995)

Singles from Up to Our Hips
- 1. "Can't Get Out of Bed" Released: 24 January 1994; 2. "I Never Want an Easy Life If Me and He Were Ever to Get There" Released: 7 March 1994; 3. "Jesus Hairdo" Released: 20 June 1994

Up to Our Hips is the third studio album by British rock band the Charlatans, released on 21 March 1994 through Beggars Banquet Records. They released their second studio album Between 10th and 11th in early 1992; by the year's end, they were working on material for its follow-up. Keyboardist Rob Collins was arrested for participating in an attempted armed robbery. After being bailed out, the band continued writing, splitting into pairs or working alone on songs.

Steve Hillage was drafted in to produce their next album at Monnow Valley Studio in Monmouth. During the sessions, Collins went to trial before being subsequently imprisoned in September 1993. The band finished recording sometime after, with overdubs at The Mill in Cookham, Berkshire. Up to Our Hips is a funk rock album that has retroactively been referred to as Britpop; Collins' bout in prison acted as lyric inspiration for frontman Tim Burgess, alongside Their Satanic Majesties Request (1967) by the Rolling Stones.

"Can't Get Out of Bed" was released as the album's lead single in January 1994; the band promoted it with an appearance on Top of the Pops, the same day that Collins was released from prison. It was followed by a tour of mainland Europe and the second single, "I Never Want an Easy Life If Me and He Were Ever to Get There", in March 1994. The band went on a tour of the United States, which ended early when Collins grew tired of touring. "Jesus Hairdo" was released as the album's third single in June 1994.

Up to Our Hips received mixed reviews from music critics, some complaining about the album's sound while others found it to be an underrated release. It peaked at number eight in the UK and number ten in Scotland. "Can't Get Out of Bed" and "I Never Want an Easy Life If Me and He Were Ever to Get There" reached the top 40 in the UK, while "Jesus Hairdo" sat outside this range. "I Never Want an Easy Life If Me and He Were Ever to Get There" and "Jesus Hairdo" fared better in Scotland, with the former reaching the top 30 in that territory.

== Background and Collins' arrest ==
The Charlatans released their second studio album Between 10th and 11th in March 1992 through Situation Two, a Beggars Banquet Records subsidiary. It was critically lambasted upon its release and showed a drop in album sales due to the public backlash towards the Madchester scene. It peaked at number 21 on the UK Albums Chart; out of its two singles, "Weirdo" reached the highest, charting at number 19 on the UK Singles Chart. The band promoted the album with two tours of the United States, a stint in mainland Europe, and a short trek to Japan, running into September 1992. They then spent the following months writing material, wanting to move away from the electronic nature of Between 10th and 11th, and relaxing.

The Charlatans rehearsed at the Greenhouse in Heaton Norris, Stockport, where they recorded ideas with a four-track cassette recorder. In December 1992, keyboardist Rob Collins was arrested, along with his friend Michael Whitehouse, for participating in an attempted armed robbery. The pair had been out drinking, and Collins drove them to an off-licence. He heard a gunshot and saw Whitehouse, who had a prop gun, fleeing the shop. Collins managed to get Whitehouse into the car and drove them to Wednesbury, where they were arrested. After five days in custody, Collins was charged with being the getaway driver. His bail was set at £25,000, which was paid for by his father. The incident saw him lose his passport, which angered the rest of the Charlatans, as if Collins was found guilty, he could face five years in prison.

== Writing ==
In March 1993, the Charlatans co-headlined the Daytripper festival with Ride at Brighton Centre in Brighton and Empress Ballroom in Blackpool. The idea for these events came from Burgess having discussions with Ride's Mark Gardener at the Reading Festival the previous year. The shows were intended to bring the Charlatans' name back into mainstream consciousness. As the band wanted to avoid a situation similar to the making of Between 10th and 11th, where they felt forced to write and record tracks, any of the members were allowed to veto any suggestions for new material. The members would write songs either individually or in pairs to show to the rest of the band when they would work on them as a unit.

This method of working allowed them to have a pool of material to choose from when it came time to record their next album. Burgess and guitarist Mark Collins wrote traditionally structured songs, while bassist Martin Blunt and drummer Jon Brookes opted for material that mixed dance, funk, and heavy rock. Burgess and Blunt spent some time writing at Rob Collins' house. As Blunt was withdrawn during the making of Between 10th and 11th, he wanted to have more creative control with its follow-up. His ideas for that album were overshadowed by Collins' contributions. Demos were then recorded at Jacobs Studios in Farnham, Surrey; early versions of "Can't Get Out of Bed", "Feel Flows", and "I Never Want an Easy Life If Me and He Were Ever to Get There" were worked on here.

== Recording and Collins' prison sentence ==
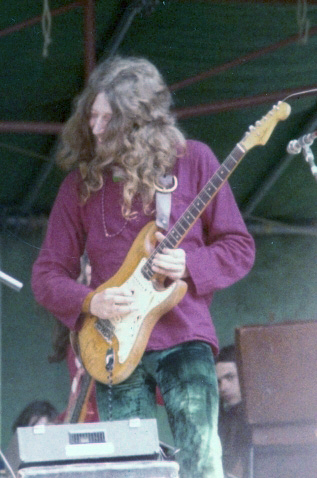
Steve Hillage (pictured in 1974) had constantly asked the band's manager for the opportunity to record them, confident that he could capture their live sound.

Though Flood was considered to produce the band's next album, he was unable to schedule time for the band. With what they learned working with him, the band set about finding a new producer and engineer. In April 1993, they met up with Dave Charles, a long-time engineer who had previously worked with Elvis Costello, the La's, and Edwin Starr. The Charlatans toyed with the idea of enlisting Hugo Nicolson and DJ Andrew Weatherall from Junior Boy's Own as producers, both of whom had worked with Primal Scream. Steve Hillage's name was then suggested as a potential producer by a friend of the band, Johnny Male of Airstream. Hillage had been a member of Gong and had previously worked with Charles in the 1980s. The Charlatans, meanwhile, knew of him from his other band, System 7, as well as his writing on "Blue Room" (1992) by the Orb. Hillage's solo album L (1976) was a favourite of Burgess and Collins'. Hillage had been repeatedly asking Harrison for a chance to record the band. He was adamant about being able to accurately capture their live sound in recordings.

Recording was held at Monnow Valley Studio in Monmouth, Wales. They spent some time demoing material with Charles and another engineer, Simon Dawson, until Hillage arrived at the studio two weeks later. They played back the 20 demos they had to Hillage, who opined that the band was losing the original feeling for the songs and set about recording their live energy. Rob Collins proposed that the band should "stop trying so hard and loosen up again", which Hillage claimed he could help them achieve. Collins took charge during the recording process; Brookes explained that Collins would "throw himself into his playing or his [backing] singing, let himself become really open". Collins' trial started on 23 August 1993 at the Stafford Crown Court. A charge of possessing a firearm was dropped, and Collins altered his plea, claiming that Whitehouse had not planned to go through with it until he had heard a noise.

His legal team tried persuading the judge with a variety of pressing clips about the band, trying to argue that since the band reached number one previously, Collins would have no reason to help rob an off licence for a small sum of money. Character witnesses and a psychiatrist's evaluation of Collins' mental state followed. The charges were then reduced to "assisting an offender after a crime", and the trial was adjourned for further consideration. Upon hearing that the trial was on pause, Burgess remarked, "Brilliant, let's get back in the studio". The rest of the band thought Collins would face a severe reprimand, such as a suspended sentence and at least a hundred hours of community service. The trial recommenced on 20 September 1993, with the judge giving Whitehouse and Collins a custodial sentence; the former received four years while the latter got eight months and was sent to Shrewsbury Prison. Burgess said the rest of the band got a call from Harrison, "and he's going, 'All right Tim, it's over.' So we're like 'What time are you getting back?' and he replied, 'We're not, it's over. Rob's in prison.'"

With Collins incarcerated, Blunt took charge of recording. Mark Collins' brother John contributed some keyboard parts during the process. After six weeks, Rob Collins was relocated to an open prison in Redditch; here, he was able to have a Walkman, which allowed him to listen to the material the band was working on. Hillage's knowledge of sampling allowed the band to use some of Collins' keyboard parts that he had recorded prior. Burgess said that John Collins had played on "Inside Looking-Out" and did overdubs for "Jesus Hairdo" and "Patrol". Blunt had a keyboardist, known only as Nigel, contribute to "Feel Flows"; Burgess estimated that the remaining six songs had keyboard parts from Rob Collins. At one point, Hillage went on a break from recording to return to London, leaving Charles in the role. Recording wrapped up while Collins was still in prison, with Burgess finishing vocals for "Patrol" and "Inside Looking-Out" at The Mill in Cookham, Berkshire. All of the songs were produced by Hillage, bar "Jesus Hairdo", which was produced by Charles and the band. The recordings were then mixed at The Mill. Author Dominic Wills in The Charlatans: The Authorised History (1999) said Blunt had doubts about the album's sound during this process, noting the use of drugs taking place, "believ[ing] this had [...] reduced its sense of urgency".

== Composition and lyrics ==
=== Music and themes ===
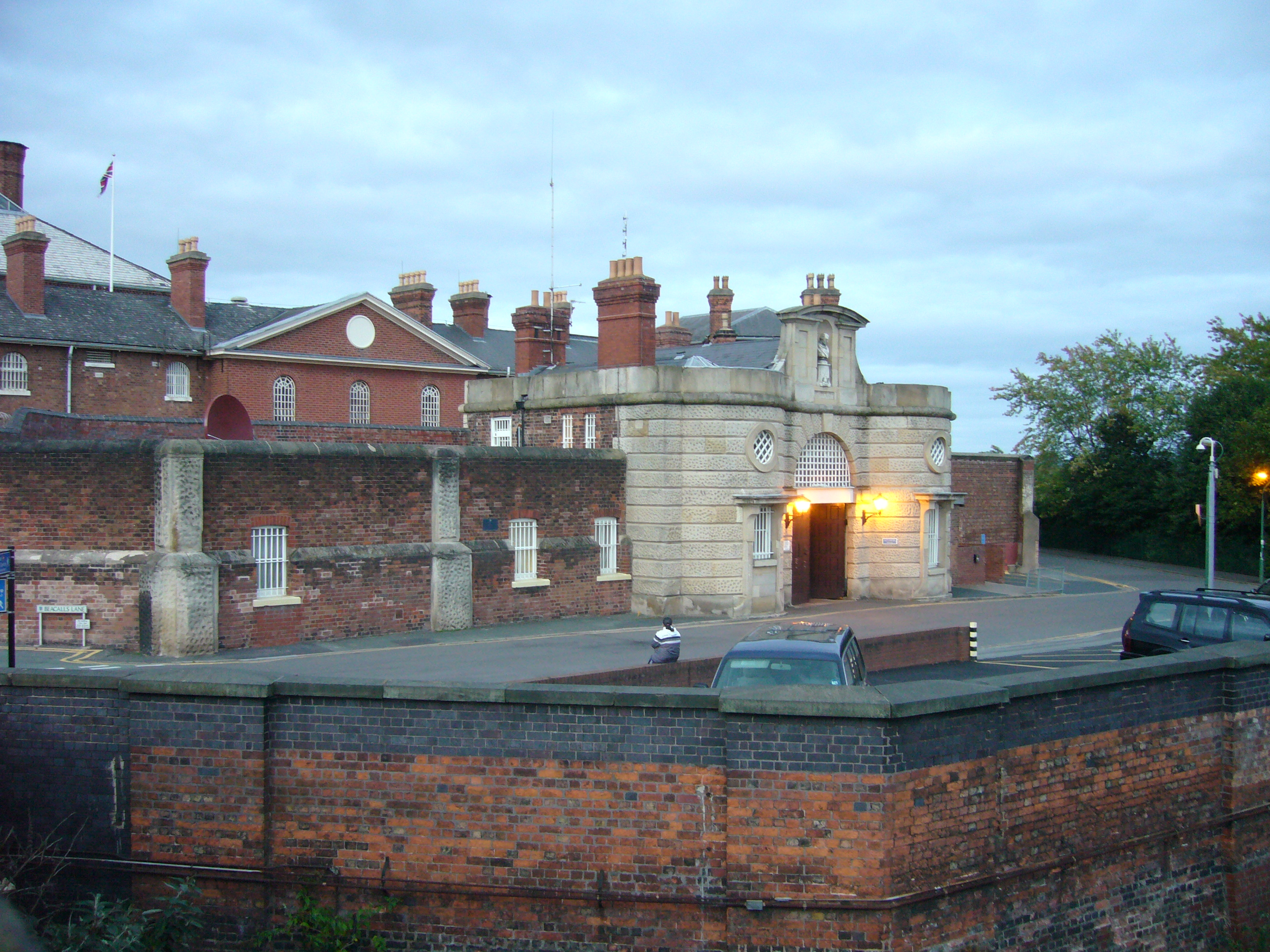
Burgess said Collins' stay at the Shrewsbury Prison (pictured in 2009) acted as lyrical inspiration for the album.

Musically, the sound of Up to Our Hips has been described as funk rock; it has retroactively been referred to as Britpop. Writing in 2012, Burgess said the band were "as much a part of Britpop as we were of Baggy – we didn't ask to be included, but it certainly helped." Wills said the band was only retroactively being categorised as such "by virtue of being a British band", with Burgess nowadays being "accused of ripping off Liam Gallagher" from Oasis, a band who would not find success until later in 1994. Steve Taylor, in his book The A to X of Alternative Music (2006), invoked this comparison in regards to Up to Our Hips, saying Burgess' vocals sat between the likes of Bob Dylan and Gallagher. Brookes explained that each member was widening their music tastes, consuming the works of the Beach Boys, Can, Faces, and Funkadelic.

Robb, meanwhile, heard influences from the works of the Beatles, Dylan, and Jimi Hendrix. Under the direction of Blunt, the album had more of an emphasis on bass. The album places more of an emphasis on organic acoustic instrumentation, as keyboards are relegated to a background role. Journalist John Robb, in his biography of the Charlatans, The Charlatans: We Are Rock (1998), highlighted "Can't Get Out of Bed" and said Burgess "sneered the vocal line in a far more confident drawl" than the "whispier vocal outings" heard on the previous two albums. He added that Mark Collins' guitarwork signalled a change in the band's sound as they "moved into the business of writing tuffer 6-string pop [...] and into the world of being a great rock & roll band", as they explored with the rest of the album.

Describing the title, Burgess said the band felt they were "up to our hips in shit", alluding to Rob Collins' trial and prison sentence. Mark Collins said as the year progressed, "we felt we were up to our hips coming out of the water. [...] It was probably the most optimistic year for the band." Burgess felt that the album had a "sense of urgency but also a sense of hatred" to it, which he attributed to worrying about Collins going to prison. They were "thinking we had to rush the LP, finish it before he went down, because if we didn't there wasn't going to be an LP and there wasn't going to be a Charlatans anymore." Collins' stint in prison served as lyrical inspiration for Burgess, who had wanted to inquire about Collins' frame of mind during the trial proceedings. Burgess was concerned about the term Generation X and its slacker connotations: "People think that because we call songs things like 'Can't Get Out of Bed' and 'Easy Life' that we're a lazy bunch of miserable bastards, but 'Easy Life' is about not wanting an easy life. There's got to be excitement". Burgess said the making of the album reminded him of Their Satanic Majesties Request (1967) by the Rolling Stones, which saw members of that band go in and out of court for drug busts. This, in turn, inspired him to write smarter lyrics.

=== Tracks ===
Robb theorised that the title of the album's opening track, "Come in Number 21", referred to a chart position. It features Stranglers-esque keyboard work against a 1960s-like chord progression. "I Never Want an Easy Life If Me and He Were Ever to Get There" was inspired by disagreements and tense situations that Burgess would be in with Collins. The chorus sections were influenced by the Beatles' "I Am the Walrus" (1967). Discussing the pop rock track "Can't Get Out of Bed", Burgess said he wrote from the perspective of Collins and what was going through his head during the robbery. The title referred to how Burgess and Collins would often be awake early working on song ideas, while the rest of the band did not wake until midday. The song started out as a Small Faces-indebted instrumental, evoking the material on their 1968 album Ogdens' Nut Gone Flake. The keyboard parts were reminiscent of those by Al Kooper of the Band. The song's bridge portion references John Lennon and Yoko Ono's bed-ins. "Feel Flows" evolved from a drum pattern from Brookes; its name is a reference to a song from the Surf's Up album (1971) by the Beach Boys. The song began under the name "It's Only the Music" and evokes the music of Can and Parliament. Burgess was impressed by the other members' contributions to the song; he convinced them to remove his vocal track from the song, leaving it as an instrumental. He had come up with lyrics for it but felt his singing was not to his satisfaction.

"Autograph" is an acoustic ballad anchored by a hand-clapping backbeat. Burgess said he wrote it about journalist Emma Forrest, who was the youngest person to write for NME when she was 16. Some of the lyrics allude to Wonderland Avenue: Tales of Glamour and Excess (1989), the autobiography of the Doors publicist Danny Sugerman. Burgess and Mark Collins wanted it to emulate the sound of the Plastic Ono Band. "Jesus Hairdo" was influenced by Shampoo Planet (1992) by Douglas Coupland and had obtuse lyrics that recalled the Fall. In the book, the protagonist Tyler is obsessive with his hair care; while reading it, Burgess said the words "Jesus" and "hairdo" stood out to him. "Up to Our Hips" was the first song written after Rob Collins' arrest and features keyboard parts in the vein of Deep Purple and a bass part akin to the one heard in "Come Together" (1969) by the Beatles. Burgess said "Patrol", which employs imagery of police officers patrolling, discusses "getting into somebody's mind". It was inspired by Buhloone Mindstate (1993) by De La Soul. "Another Rider Up in Flames", which was originally titled "Set Your Hair on Fire", is the first piece of music that Burgess wrote, co-writing it with Mark Collins. The title was inspired by the work of director David Lynch, while the music was inspired by the work of David Crosby. The title of "Inside-Looking Out" was taken from a letter Collins had sent the band and their manager. Blunt came up with the guitar riff for it, which he felt could be done with an accompanying keyboard part. As Rob Collins was in prison at the time, Blunt spent three days learning how to write and play this part. It opens with a guitar part similar to the one heard in "Crosstown Traffic" (1968) by Hendrix. Burgess said the song was his "perception of what it'd be like being stuck in a confined area thinking about your friends are doing on the outside".

== Release ==
=== Initial promotion and first two singles ===
Since the release of Between 10th and 11th, the musical landscape has shifted away from Madchester towards Britpop with the release of Modern Life Is Rubbish by Blur in 1993. According to Robb, the Charlatans navigated a landscape that was also opening up to the jungle, London-focused mod revival, and Bristol-centred trip hop scenes. Alongside this, the band was posed for success amongst the burgeoning lad culture, which was "looking for 1960s-tinged pop made by post-Stone Roses bands with bowl cuts and casual clobber." "Can't Get Out of Bed" was released as the lead single from Up to Our Hips on 24 January 1994 through Beggars Banquet Records, with "Withdrawn" and "Out" as its B-sides. The track was released to modern rock radio stations in the US the following month. The music video for it was filmed on a rooftop in London and in a rehearsal room. Collins' sentence was shortened by four months for good behaviour, resulting in his release occurring on 3 February 1994. A car was sent to collect him; the band played "Can't Get Out of Bed" on Top of the Pops the same day. Later that month, the band embarked on a tour of mainland Europe.

"Can't Get Out of Bed" was released to modern rock and college radio stations in the US on 14 February 1994. Atlantic Records' executive vice president, Val Azzoli, said the decision to release it to these kinds of stations was intended to show the difference between the new album's direction and the house and techno styles of their previous releases. In other US radio formats, the song later impacted album-oriented rock radio on 31 March and contemporary hit radio on 7 April. "I Never Want an Easy Life If Me and He Were Ever to Get There" was released as the album's second single on 7 March 1994. "Only a Boho", "Subterranean", and a demo version of "Can't Get Out of Bed" were released as its B-sides. The music video for "I Never Want an Easy Life If Me and He Were Ever to Get There" consisted of live footage from the European tour earlier in the year. Coinciding with this, the band played a BBC Radio 1 session for DJ Mark Radcliffe, performing "Jesus Hairdo", "Autograph", "I Never Want an Easy Life If Me and He Were Ever to Get There", and "Feel Flows". The band then performed another BBC Radio 1 session, this time for DJs Steve Lamacq and Jo Whiley, playing "I Never Want an Easy Life If Me and He Were Ever to Get There", "Another Rider Up in Flames" and "Up to Our Hips".

=== Album promotion and third single ===
Up to Our Hips was released on 21 March 1994 through Beggars Banquet. Its US release occurred the following day through Beggars Banquet and Atlantic Records; the latter wanted to establish the band as a new act in that territory. As such, it saw the band drop The Charlatans UK moniker that their previous albums had. This name came about in 1990 when a US band of the same name owned the original moniker. The new album marked the first project of Atlantic's distribution deal with Beggars Banquet. Azzoli said one of Atlantic's reasons for the deal was getting to work with the Charlatans. Burgess liked the arrangement, as he was fond of the soul music that Atlantic had released in the 1960s. The band had convinced the staff at Atlantic that the issue with the American Charlatans had been resolved.

For the frontcover artwork, they wanted to recreate a photo by Lewis Morley, known for his work in the 1950s and 1960s. Though Wills credits Blunt for this idea, Burgess said he came up with it. The cover is a two-colour shot of Michel, a hairdresser, and Giselle, a model, both of whom were friends of the band. While the hairdresser in Morley's photo was shirtless, the hairdresser in the band wanted to keep his shirt on. Blunt wanted to prove that the band were "more than just haircuts, more than just bowl-heads on the make". The cover would become a point of contention within the band in the ensuing years: people in the US, who were aware that Collins had gone to prison, thought the cover was of a new keyboardist; others assumed it was a new release from the American Charlatans since the Charlatans UK moniker had been dropped. Burgess later expressed regret for the re-creation, wishing that they had used Morley's original photograph instead. The back cover artwork features a shot of a bass drum.

The band played one-off shows at the Trentham Gardens in Stoke-on-Trent and at the Sound City festival in Glasgow, prior to a tour of the US. Because of Collins' criminal record, the band was worried that he might be denied entry into the country and toyed with the idea of drafting James Taylor, formerly of the Prisoners. Collins and the band's lawyer spent two days at the US Embassy in London sorting out the potential until he was given the go-ahead. Their month-long US trek began on 16 April 1994, having previously declined invitations to tour with the Lemonheads, the Cranberries, and INXS, the last of which annoyed Atlantic Records. The label had difficulty selling the album to the US market, despite getting the band a special on MTV and an appearance on Late Night with Conan O'Brien. Around this time, the American Charlatans threatened to sue the UK band, as their albums were being re-released, for $3.5 million if they tried promoting themselves as simply the Charlatans in the US. The UK band promptly re-started using the Charlatans UK name, which resulted in tour posters needing to be altered and dates rescheduled.

The Charlatans later learned that some of the posters had only been plastered up a week before the shows, resulting in low ticket sales. This trek covered the East Coast and was intended to be followed by a stint on the West Coast, until Collins voiced his refusal, having grown tired of the touring. The band then played at the Apollo Rock Festival in Brussels and the Pinkpop Festival in the Netherlands in May 1994, followed by three shows in the UK, which were supported by Gene. After this, all touring engagements were cancelled, including an appearance at Glastonbury Festival, due to a cyst growing on Blunt's buttocks. "Jesus Hairdo" was released as the album's third and final single on 20 June 1994. Two versions were released on CD: the first with "Stir It Up", a Dust Brothers remix of "Patrol", and a Van Basten remix of "Feel Flows" as its B-sides, while the other featured the three songs from the Lamacq and Whiley radio session. The "Jesus Hairdo" music video featured Burgess painting the British and American flags on himself; it was directed by Wiz, who had made the video for "Weekender" (1992) by Flowered Up.

=== Reissues and related releases ===
Up to Our Hips was re-pressed on vinyl in 2017. "I Never Want an Easy Life If Me and He Were Ever to Get There", "Can't Get Out of Bed", and "Jesus Hairdo" were included on the band's first compilation album, Melting Pot (1998). "Can't Get Out of Bed" was featured on their third compilation album, Forever: The Singles (2006). "Can't Get Out of Bed" and "Jesus Hairdo" were included on their fifth compilation album, A Head Full of Ideas (2021). As part of the 2019 Record Store Day event, "I Never Want an Easy Life If Me and He Were Ever to Get There", "Can't Get Out of Bed", and "Jesus Hairdo" were released as part of the seven-inch vinyl box set Everything Changed (2019).

== Reception ==
Professional ratings
Review scores
Source	Rating
AllMusic	4/5 stars
Alternative Rock	7/10
The Encyclopedia of Popular Music	3/5 stars
The New Rolling Stone Album Guide	3/5 stars
NME	6/10
Select	3/5
Vox	4/10

Up to Our Hips was met with mixed reviews from music critics. Wills said despite successful shows in the UK, reviews of the album were "dreadful; the singles weren't scoring, and America was having none of it."

Vox writer Craig McLean felt that the band "mooch through an album that is almost totally bereft of colour and spirit", adding that the music seems "lost in a sludge of muted guitars and wobbling bass and organ doodles". Doug Brod and Ira Robbins of Trouser Press felt that the album "yielded lackluster results" with its "sluggish tempos and a general lack of dynamic juice". They highlighted four songs where the band "sounds as if it misread the speed limit and is going as slow as humanly possible". The Blade's Doug Iverson considered the band's attempt to switch to acoustic instrumentation successful, "adding grace and texture", but negatively compared it to Depeche Mode as it appropriates the "plodding style" of that band across several of the songs.

NME writer Jon Harris was disappointed with the album, saying it had a constant feeling of "almost but not quite" throughout its length. Sian Pattenden of Select said the band continued with the same sound they had before, namely, "cheesy guitar embellishment, guitar solos, alternately on flange and wah wah, whiny vocals, etc.", but conceded "it's actually not half bad". Louder's Stephen Hill called it a "deeply unfocused and rambling set of psych-rock bumbling, saved by the excellently summery "Can't Get Out of Bed". Kevin Gibson of Louisville Music News said that "[m]aybe the best thing about this band is that they never lose their cool – that is, they never seem to take things too far." The staff at Melody Maker were more supportive of the album but said some of the "odder" songs ruined its prospects, such as "Autograph" and "Up to Our Hips", saying that these songs offered "sluggish boredom".

AllMusic reviewer Ned Raggett noted that the "production was a touch more straightforward" compared to the band's previous album, Hillage, "otherwise let the Charlatans be the Charlatans; where changes are apparent, it's more in the name of atmosphere than attention-getting." Consumable Online editor Bob Gajarsky added to this, stating that it was a return to their earlier sound, heard on their debut studio album Some Friendly (1990). Author Dave Thompson, in his book Alternative Rock (2000), wrote that Hillage's work "does lose some mystery with the cobwebs, but the songs stand up regardless." In comparing the trajectory of the Charlatans with Beastie Boys, Robb said Up to Our Hips and the latter's Paul's Boutique (1989) were both "flawed masterpieces but had set the groups up for critical and commercial success" with their later releases.

Up to Our Hips charted at number eight in the UK and number ten in Scotland. It was certified silver by the British Phonographic Industry (BPI) in July 2013. "Can't Get Out of Bed" charted at number 24 in the UK. "I Never Want an Easy Life If Me and He Were Ever to Get There" charted at number 23 in Scotland and number 38 in the UK. "Jesus Hairdo" charted at number 37 in Scotland and number 48 in the UK.

== Track listing ==
All songs written by Martin Blunt, Jon Brookes, Tim Burgess, Mark Collins, and Rob Collins.

Up to Our Hips track listing
No.	Title	Producer	Length
1.	"Come in Number 21"	Steve Hillage	4:21
2.	"I Never Want an Easy Life If Me and He Were Ever to Get There"	Hillage	4:07
3.	"Can't Get Out of Bed"	Hillage	3:09
4.	"Feel Flows"	Hillage	6:17
5.	"Autograph"	Hillage	4:31
6.	"Jesus Hairdo"	Dave Charles; The Charlatans	3:11
7.	"Up to Our Hips"	Hillage	4:31
8.	"Patrol"	Hillage	6:03
9.	"Another Rider Up in Flames"	Hillage	3:20
10.	"Inside-Looking Out"	Hillage	5:04

== Personnel ==
Personnel per booklet, except where noted.

The Charlatans

- Martin Blunt – bass
- Jon Brookes – drums
- Tim Burgess – vocals
- Mark Collins – guitar
- Rob Collins – organ, piano, backing vocals

Additional musicians

- Steve Hillage – programming
- John Collins – keyboard

Production and design

- Steve Hillage – producer (all except track 6)
- Dave Charles – engineer, producer (track 6), mixing (track 4)
- The Charlatans – producer (track 6)
- Tom Sheehan – booklet, cover photography
- Kim Tonelli – front cover photography
- Michael – cover star
- Giselle – cover star
- Hunter Anders – sleeve
- Alison Fielding – sleeve

== Charts and certifications ==
=== Weekly charts ===
Chart performance for Up to Our Hips
Chart (1994)	Peak position
Australian Albums (ARIA)	151
Scottish Albums (OCC)	10
UK Albums (OCC)	8

=== Certifications ===
Certifications for Up to Our Hips
Region	Certification	Certified units/sales
United Kingdom (BPI)	Silver	60,000^{^}
^{^} Shipments figures based on certification alone.
