= Melting Pot (The Charlatans album) =

Greatest hits album by The Charlatans
- Released: 23 February 1998
- Recorded: 1990–1997
- Genre: Alternative rock, Madchester
- Length: 74:15
- Label: Beggars Banquet
- Producer: Chris Nagle, David Allen, Flood, Steve Hillage, Dave Charles, The Charlatans

The Charlatans chronology
Tellin' Stories (1997)	Melting Pot (1998)	Us and Us Only (1999)

Professional ratings
Review scores
Source	Rating
AllMusic	4.5/5 stars
Pitchfork	8.2/10
Select	4/5
Uncut	5/5 stars
The Rolling Stone Album Guide	4/5 stars

Melting Pot is a greatest hits album by the British alternative rock band The Charlatans (known in the United States as The Charlatans UK). Featuring tracks from their time on Beggars Banquet Records between 1990 and 1997, the album was released on 23 February 1998. The cover features a picture of The Weaverdale cafe (subsequently renamed The Melting Pot, but closed in November 2016, and serving now as a BBQ takeaway) in Northwich, the site of the group's first meeting after signing to Beggars in 1990. The song "Opportunity Three" is a remix by Flood of the song "Opportunity" from the Some Friendly album; the remix otherwise appeared only on the Over Rising EP.

The album was re-released on 20 May 2002 with a slipcase to match the artwork of B-sides compilation Songs from the Other Side. No changes were made to the album artwork or track listing.

== Track listing ==
All tracks are written by Blunt, Brookes, Burgess, M. Collins, R. Collins unless otherwise stated.

No.	Title	Writer(s)	Length
1.	"The Only One I Know"	Baker, Blunt, Brookes, Burgess, R. Collins	4:00
2.	"Then"		4:14
3.	"Opportunity Three" (from Over Rising EP)	Blunt, Brookes, Burgess	7:28
4.	"Over Rising" (from Over Rising EP)	Baker, Blunt, Brookes, Burgess, R. Collins	3:40
5.	"Sproston Green" (US version) (1991 non-album single and B-side to "Weirdo")	Baker, Blunt, Burgess, R. Collins	4:20
6.	"Weirdo"	Blunt, Brookes, Burgess, R. Collins	3:45
7.	"Theme from the Wish" (B-Side of "Weirdo")	Blunt, Brookes, M. Collins, R. Collins	3:33
8.	"Patrol" (The Chemical Brothers mix) (B-Side of "Jesus Hairdo")		7:00
9.	"Can't Get Out of Bed"		3:12
10.	"I Never Want an Easy Life If Me and He Were Ever to Get There"		4:13
11.	"Jesus Hairdo"		3:13
12.	"Crashin' In"		5:02
13.	"Just Lookin'"		3:51
14.	"Here Comes a Soul Saver"		3:25
15.	"Just When You're Thinkin' Things Over"		4:55
16.	"One to Another"		4:30
17.	"North Country Boy"		4:03

== Charts ==
=== Weekly charts ===
Chart (1998)	Peak position
Scottish Albums (OCC)	1
UK Albums (OCC)	4

=== Year-end charts ===
Chart (1998)	Position
UK Albums (OCC)	81

== Certifications ==
Region	Certification	Certified units/sales
United Kingdom (BPI)	Platinum	300,000^{*}
^{*} Sales figures based on certification alone.
