= Over Rising =

1991 single by the Charlatans

Single by the Charlatans
- Released: 25 February 1991
- Genre: Baggy
- Length: 3:41
- Label: Situation Two
- Songwriters: Baker, Blunt, Brookes, Burgess, and R. Collins
- Producer: Dave Allen

The Charlatans singles chronology
"Sproston Green" (1991)	"Over Rising" (1991)	"Me. In Time" (1991)

"Over Rising" is the fourth single by the English alternative rock band the Charlatans, released on 25 February 1991 by label Situation Two. It followed "The Only One I Know" and "Then" into the UK Singles Chart top 20, reaching number 15, and peaked at number seven in Ireland, where it remains the group's only top-10 hit.

Although "Over Rising" was never included on any of the band's studio albums, it did appear on their first greatest hits compilation, 1998's Melting Pot. It was one of two non-album singles (excluding the re-release of their debut single "Indian Rope") released by the group in 1991. "Over Rising" was the last Charlatans single to feature the group's original guitarist John Baker, who was replaced by Mark Collins in mid-1991.

== Track listings ==
All tracks were written by Baker, Blunt, Brookes, Burgess, and R. Collins except as indicated.

7-inch vinyl

1. "Over Rising" – 3:41
2. "Way Up There" – 4:38

12-inch vinyl

1. "Over Rising" – 3:41
2. "Way Up There" – 4:38
3. "Opportunity Three" (Blunt, Brookes, Burgess) – 7:27
4. "Happen to Die" – 3:04

CD

1. "Over Rising" – 3:41
2. "Way Up There" – 4:38
3. "Happen to Die" – 3:04
4. "Opportunity Three" (Blunt, Brookes, Burgess) – 7:27

== Charts ==
Chart (1991)	Peak position
Australia (ARIA)	146
Europe (Eurochart Hot 100)	26
Ireland (IRMA)	7
UK Singles (OCC)	15
UK Airplay (Music Week)	33
