= One to Another =

1996 single by the Charlatans

Single by the Charlatans

from the album Tellin' Stories
- B-side: "Two of Us"; "Reputation"
- Released: 26 August 1996
- Studio: Monnow Valley, Rockfield (Rockfield, Wales)
- Genre: Britpop
- Length: 4:32
- Label: Beggars Banquet
- Songwriters: Martin Blunt; Jon Brookes; Tim Burgess; Mark Collins; Rob Collins
- Producers: The Charlatans; Dave Charles

The Charlatans singles chronology
| "Just When You're Thinkin' Things Over" (1995) | "One to Another" (1996) | "North Country Boy" (1997) |

"One to Another" is a song by British alternative rock band the Charlatans. It was the first single from their fifth album, Tellin' Stories (1997), and their first single following the death of the band's keyboardist, Rob Collins. The single remains their highest-charting song in the United Kingdom, reaching number three on the UK Singles Chart. The track features drum loops provided by Tom Rowlands of the Chemical Brothers.

"One to Another" serves as the theme song to the UK channel E4 show My Mad Fat Diary. In 2022, Pixey and Mint Royale released a cover of the song, which served as the theme song for the BT Sport 2022-23 Premier League season.

== Track listings ==
All tracks were written by Martin Blunt, Jon Brookes, Tim Burgess, Mark Collins and Rob Collins.

UK CD single

1. "One to Another"
2. "Two of Us"
3. "Reputation"

UK 7-inch and cassette single

1. "One to Another" – 4:32
2. "Two of Us" – 4:07

== Credits and personnel ==
Credits are adapted from the Tellin' Stories album booklet.

Studios

- Recorded and mixed at Monnow Valley Studios (Rockfield, Wales)
- Partially recorded at Rockfield Studios (Rockfield, Wales)

Personnel

- The Charlatans – production
  - Martin Blunt – writing, bass
  - Jon Brookes – writing, drums
  - Tim Burgess – writing, vocals
  - Mark Collins – writing, guitar
  - Rob Collins – writing, vocals, keyboards
- Martin Duffy – keyboards
- Dave Charles – percussion, production, engineering
- Tom Rowlands – loops

== Charts ==
=== Weekly charts ===
| Chart (1996–1997) | Peak position |
|---|---|
| Europe (Eurochart Hot 100) | 33 |
| Ireland (IRMA) | 25 |
| Scottish Singles Sales (Official Charts) | 1 |
| Sweden (Sverigetopplistan) | 59 |
| UK Singles (Official Charts) | 3 |
| UK Indie (Music Week) | 1 |
| US Alternative Top 50 (Radio & Records) | 34 |

=== Year-end charts ===
| Chart (1996) | Position |
|---|---|
| UK Singles (OCC) | 96 |

== Certifications ==
| Region | Certification | Certified units/sales |
|---|---|---|
| United Kingdom (BPI) | Silver | 200,000^{‡} |
^{‡} Sales+streaming figures based on certification alone.

== Release history ==
| Region | Date | Format(s) | Label(s) | Ref. |
|---|---|---|---|---|
| United Kingdom | 26 August 1996 | 7-inch vinyl; CD; cassette | Beggars Banquet | |
| United States | 30 June 1997 | Alternative radio | MCA | |
