= Forever. The Singles =

Forever. The Singles.

Greatest hits album by The Charlatans
- Released: 13 November 2006
- Recorded: 1990–2006
- Genre: Rock
- Length: CD1: 77:08
- Label: Island
- Producer: Various

The Charlatans chronology
| Simpatico (2006) | Forever. The Singles. (2006) | You Cross My Path (2008) |

Singles from Forever. The Singles.
- 1. "You're So Pretty, We're So Pretty (Version '06)" Released: 20 November 2006

Forever. The Singles. is a greatest hits album featuring selected singles released by the British band The Charlatans (known in the United States as The Charlatans UK) spanning their entire career from 1990 to 2006. The album was released on 13 November 2006. It is also available as a limited edition two-CD set containing a bonus CD of rarities as well as a separate DVD release featuring selected music videos and live performances.

It is the band's second greatest hits package following 1998's Melting Pot.

== Track listing ==
=== CD1 ===
1. "Indian Rope"
2. "The Only One I Know"
3. "Weirdo"
4. "Can't Get Out of Bed"
5. "Just When You're Thinkin' Things Over"
6. "One to Another"
7. "North Country Boy"
8. "How High"
9. "Tellin' Stories"
10. "Forever"
11. "My Beautiful Friend"
12. "Impossible"
13. "Love Is The Key"
14. "A Man Needs To Be Told"
15. "Up at the Lake"
16. "Try Again Today"
17. "Blackened Blue Eyes"
18. "You're So Pretty – We're So Pretty" (Version '06)

=== CD2 ===
1. "Always in Mind" – John Peel Show 20 March 1990
2. "Polar Bear" – John Peel Show 20 March 1990
3. "Between 10th & 11th" – John Peel Show 22 January 1991
4. "(No One) Not Even The Rain" – Mark Goodier Show 5 October 1991
5. "Autograph" – Mark Radcliffe Show 7 July 1994
6. "Up To Our Hips" – Steve Lamacq show 14 March 1994
7. "Another Rider Up in Flames" – Steve Lamacq Show 14 March 1994
8. "Crashin' In" – Mark Radcliffe Show – 31 July 1995
9. "A Man Needs To Be Told" – Live Lounge, Jo Whiley 18 November 2001
10. "Feel The Pressure"
11. "Wave The World Goodbye"
12. "See How Clear It Is"
13. "Try Again Today"
- Tracks 1–9: The Charlatans Live at the BBC
- Tracks 10–13: Up at the Lake Demos
