= Eugene Francis Jnr =

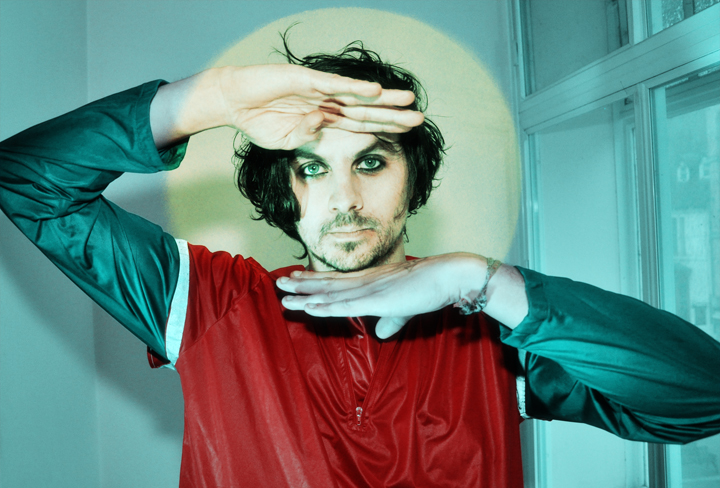
- Eugene Francis Jnr in 2012

Background information
- Also known as: Prints Jackson, Kip Armstrong, Eso Burst
- Born: Kristian Charles Williams; March 8, 1977 (age 48); Bridgend, Wales
- Origin: Cardiff, Wales
- Genres: Folk, Electronic, Punk-Rock, alternative, Blues
- Occupations: Singer, songwriter, guitarist, percussionist
- Instruments: vocals, guitar, bass, banjo, synthesizers, keyboards, drums, mandolin, theremin
- Years active: 2001–present
- Labels: Legion, Mighty Atom, Fuzzbox
- Website: printsjackson.bandcamp.com/music

Eugene Francis Jnr is a Welsh musician.

== Biography ==
=== Early life ===
Francis was born in Bridgend, Wales on 8 March 1977.

=== Early groups ===
Francis's first band was The Fantastic Super Foofs, formed in Bridgend around 1994. The band started playing punk rock, and were initially known as "Mister Puss". By 1997 Francis had enrolled at University College London studying Planetary Science, where he befriended Coldplay and My Vitriol. The singles "Bilo Boss", "Devan Endo" and "Timmy Zuckermann" were released on the independent labels Floating Toast and Fuzzbox, and received positive reviews in NME and airplay from Steve Lamacq and John Peel. Francis's next project was Kaptain Black, named after musician Frank Black, combining blues, punk and country music. The album In Fertility was released in 2004 on the Mighty Atom label. Kaptain Black toured with Mclusky and released the single "Drone the Queen Bee". In 2005 Francis wrote and performed with Cardiff band Dirty Perfect under the name "Kip Armstrong". They released one EP entitled "Lines, Opiates and the demented operation" on Fuzzbox Records and one single, "Quarterback Hairdo", on Sound Foundation Records.

=== Solo career ===
Francis subsequently spent time in Los Angeles, San Francisco and New York and began experimenting with Folk, storytelling songs coupled with electronica. He returned home to Wales to start work on a concept album, The Golden Beatle. He began posting songs on MySpace and playing solo shows in London and Cardiff in 2007, and formed another group called The Juniors, including members from Vito, Broken Leaf and Lindsey Leven (of Gulp). Francis opened for Tegan and Sara, and released the vinyl double A-side single "Poor Me / Kites". The single and video received airplay on VH1, MTV2, BBC Radio 1, Radio 2, XFM and BBC 6 Music, as well as US radio station KEXP. Eugene Francis Jnr and The Juniors also played the mainstage Green Man Festival.

=== The Golden Beatle, The Juniors 2008–2009 ===
The album The Golden Beatle was completed on Christmas Eve 2007, and released in April 2008. The 7-piece band 'The Juniors' appeared with Frank Sidebottom on Channel M and on Radio 4 for Clive Anderson's 'loose ends' and toured with Todd Rungren and Coldplay. They played the Secret Garden Party and Guildfest festivals and also performed in the US at SXSW in Austin and CMJ in New York. In December 2009, The Juniors supported Coldplay at the O2 Arena in London.

=== Prints Jackson, One Song Every Month til The Day I Die 2014–2017 ===
On March 8, 2014, Francis posted a new song 'LAW A' as Prints Jackson. A new song was subsequently posted every month which was free to download. Each month included artwork from a different artist, these included Richard J Oliver, David Shillinglaw and musical collaborators included Jim Ward (musician) and Mat Whitecross

=== Guest Appearance 2023 ===
On June 6 and June 7, 2023, as part of the Music of the Spheres World Tour Kris Williams performed Green Eyes and Don't Panic (Coldplay song) as Coldplay special guest on the C-stage at Millennium Stadium in Cardiff along with Kelly Jones.

== Discography ==
- 1999 "Gliptus"
- 2001 "Bilo Boss"
- 2002 "Devan Endo", "Timmy Zuckermann"
- 2004 "In fertility", "Drone The Queen Bee"
- 2005 "Lines, Opiates and the Demented Operation", "Quarterback Hairdo"
- 2007 "Poor Me / Kites"
- 2008 "The Golden Beatle"
- 2012 "Necronomicon : I am Providence"
- 2012 "Calliope Fuxwar"
- 2014-2017 "One Song, Every Month, til the day i die'
