= Who We Touch =

Studio album by The Charlatans
- Released: 6 September 2010
- Recorded: March – June 2010
- Studio: Britannia Row and State of the Ark, London
- Genre: Indie rock
- Length: 56:36
- Label: Cooking Vinyl
- Producer: Martin "Youth" Glover

The Charlatans chronology
You Cross My Path (2008)	Who We Touch (2010)	Modern Nature (2015)

Singles from Who We Touch
- 1. "Love Is Ending" Released: 2 August 2010; 2. "My Foolish Pride" Released: 20 September 2010; 3. "Your Pure Soul" Released: 29 November 2010

Who We Touch is the eleventh studio album by British alternative rock band The Charlatans, released on 6 September 2010. It was released in a standard version and a two disc version. The second CD contained early demos, alternate mixes of tracks from the standard album, and some out-takes that didn't make it on to the album. The album charted at #21 in the UK album charts. The album was later released digitally.

This is the Charlatans' final studio album to feature drummer Jon Brookes, who was absent from the band's tour supporting the album due to getting treatment for a brain tumour. He was replaced on the tour by The Verve drummer Peter Salisbury; Brookes subsequently died in 2013.

== Reception ==
Professional ratings
Aggregate scores
Source	Rating
AnyDecentMusic?	6.3/10
Metacritic	71/100
Review scores
Source	Rating
AllMusic	4/5 stars
DIY	2.5/5 stars
Drowned in Sound	7/10
musicOMH	2/5 stars
NME	2.5/5 stars
PopMatters	7/10
Record Collector	3/5 stars
The Skinny	2.5/5 stars
Slant Magazine	3/5 stars
Time Out Abu Dhabi	4/5

Who We Touch was met with generally favourable reviews from music critics. At Metacritic, which assigns a normalized rating out of 100 to reviews from mainstream publications, the album received an average score of 71, based on 12 reviews. AnyDecentMusic? gave it a score of 6.3, based on 15 reviews.

== Track listing ==
All songs written by The Charlatans except "I Sing the Body Eclectic", written by The Charlatans and Penny Rimbaud.

No.	Title	Length
1.	"Love Is Ending"	3:48
2.	"My Foolish Pride"	4:09
3.	"Your Pure Soul"	5:39
4.	"Smash the System"	3:34
5.	"Intimacy"	5:12
6.	"Sincerity"	6:28
7.	"Trust in Desire"	5:09
8.	"When I Wonder"	3:39
9.	"Oh!"	5:56
10.	"You Can Swim" (Includes 2 hidden tracks, "On the Threshold" and "I Sing the Body Eclectic")	13:02

=== Deluxe Edition ===
Disc One
Same as 10-track version

Disc Two (bonus disc)

No.	Title	Length
1.	"Love Is Ending" (Early Version)	3:20
2.	"Intimacy" (Early Version)	3:53
3.	"Smash the System" (Early Version)	3:15
4.	"These Things" (Studio Out-take)	3:10
5.	"Your Pure Soul" (Early Version)	5:01
6.	"Sincerity" (Early Instrumental Version)	3:54
7.	"Trust in Desire" (Alternate Take)	5:11
8.	"My Foolish Pride" (Early Version)	4:10
9.	"Lips That Would Kiss" (Early Version)	4:49
10.	"Who We Touch We Don't Mind" (Studio Out-take)	4:53
11.	"Don't Know Where or When" (Studio Out-take)	5:13
12.	"Intimacy" (Alternate Mix)	5:16
13.	"Throbbing Genesis" (Studio Out-take)	2:31

== Personnel ==
The Charlatans

- Tim Burgess – lead vocals, mixing
- Mark Collins – guitars
- Martin Blunt – bass guitar
- Jon Brookes – drums
- Tony Rogers – keyboards, backing vocals

Additional personnel

- Jay Shulman – viola
- Jonathon Talbott – violin
- Penny Rimbaud – poem, vocals on "I Sing the Body Eclectic"

Production

- Martin "Youth" Glover – production
- Tim Bran, Clive Goddard – engineering
- Cameron Jenkins, Henry Hirsch – mixing
- Chris Theis – Pro Tools engineer (assisted by Bram Tobey)
- Nigel Walton – mastering
- Jazz Summers, Tim Parry – management
- Gee Vaucher – cover art and design
- Tom Sheehan – band photo
