= David Shillinglaw =

- Born: 12 December 1982 (age 43); Saudi Arabia
- Education: Central Saint Martins, London
- Known for: Painter, sculptor, drawing
- Notable work: The Dance of 1000 Faces
- Movement: Abstract art, pop art, street art, writer
- Website: Official website

David Shillinglaw (born 1982) is a British artist.

== Early life and family ==
David Shillinglaw, is a London-based artist born to British parents in Saudi Arabia. He trained at Central Saint Martins, London and graduated in 2002.

== Notable works ==
David's folk-inspired work depicts human faces and the thoughts that rush around in our brains and can be found in his murals and his various books such as "The Dance of 1000 Faces".
