= You're So Pretty – We're So Pretty =

"You're So Pretty - We're So Pretty (Version '06)"

Single by the Charlatans

from the album Forever: The Singles
- Released: 13 November 2006
- Genre: Alternative rock
- Label: Universal Records

The Charlatans singles chronology
"NYC (There's No Need to Stop)" (2006)	"You're So Pretty - We're So Pretty (Version '06)" (2006)	"You Cross My Path" (2007)

"You're So Pretty - We're So Pretty" is a song by British band the Charlatans (known in the United States as the Charlatans UK). It was originally featured on the album Wonderland in 2001. After being featured in a UK TV advertisement for Carlsberg lager in 2002, it appeared on release schedules as the third single from Wonderland but was cancelled and there were no further releases from that album.

The track was remixed in 2006 by Youth for inclusion on Forever: The Singles. This version (Version '06) was released as a single to promote the album and reached number 56 on the UK Singles Chart, as of July 2018 still their last single to hit the UK Top 100.

== Track listing ==
=== CD ===
1. "You're So Pretty - We're So Pretty" (Version '06)
2. "Feel the Pressure" (Chemical Brothers Dub)
3. "Room 518"

=== 7" ===
1. "You're So Pretty - We're So Pretty" (Version '06)
2. "NYC" (Weird Science Mix)
