= Weirdo (song) =

1992 single by the Charlatans

Single by the Charlatans

from the album Between 10th and 11th
- Released: 24 February 1992
- Length: 3:38
- Label: Situation Two, Beggars Banquet
- Songwriters: Martin Blunt, Jon Brookes, Tim Burgess, Rob Collins
- Producer: Flood

The Charlatans singles chronology
"Me. In Time" (1991)	"Weirdo" (1992)	"Tremelo Song" (1992)

"Weirdo" is a song by English band the Charlatans. It was released on 24 February 1992 by Situation Two and Beggars Banquet Records as the first single from the band's second album, Between 10th and 11th (1992), reaching No. 19 on the UK Singles Chart. The single was the band's most successful in the United States, peaking at No. 1 on the Billboard Modern Rock Tracks chart in May 1992 and No. 10 on the Billboard Hot Dance Club Play Singles chart.

== Track listings ==
All tracks were written by Brookes, Blunt, R. Collins, Burgess; except where noted

- 7-inch
1. "Weirdo" – 3:38
2. "Theme from 'The Wish'" (Brookes, M. Collins, Blunt, R. Collins) – 3:31
- 12-inch
1. "Weirdo" – 3:38
2. "Theme from 'The Wish'" (Brookes, M. Collins, Blunt, R. Collins) – 3:31
3. "Sproston Green (US Version)" (Baker, Blunt, R. Collins, Burgess) – 6:01
4. "Weirdo (Alternate Take)" – 3:24
- CD
1. "Weirdo" – 3:38
2. "Theme from 'The Wish'" (Brookes, M. Collins, Blunt, R. Collins) – 3:31
3. "Weirdo (Alternate Take)" – 3:24
4. "Sproston Green (US Version)" (Baker, Blunt, R. Collins, Burgess) – 6:01

== Charts ==
=== Weekly charts ===
Chart (1992)	Peak position
Europe (Eurochart Hot 100)	68
Ireland (IRMA)	22
Netherlands (Single Top 100)	67
UK Singles (OCC)	19
UK Airplay (Music Week)	24
US Dance Club Play (Billboard)	10
US Modern Rock Tracks (Billboard)	1

=== Year-end charts ===
Chart (1992)	Position
US Modern Rock Tracks (Billboard)	2

== See also ==
- List of Billboard number-one alternative singles of the 1990s
