= Monnow Valley Studio =

Residential recording studio and rehearsal facility in Rockfield, Monmouthshire, Wales

Coordinates: 51.8359°N 2.7517°W

Monnow Valley Studio is a residential recording studio and rehearsal facility in Rockfield, Monmouthshire, Wales.

== History ==
In the 1970s, Monnow Valley was the rehearsal facility of the famous Rockfield Studios. It became an independent studio in the 1980s owned by Charles Ward after parting from Rockfield Studios and has been used by many bands including Stereophonics, the Charlatans, Manic Street Preachers, Queen, Black Sabbath, Iggy Pop and Oasis, who used a picture of the studio interior as a cover for the single "Supersonic".

== Clients ==
Over the last thirty years, the studio has been used by many successful artists:

- Amplifier
- Attack! Attack!
- Devil Sold His Soul
- Black Sabbath
- Blood Red Shoes
- Biffy Clyro
- Billy Bragg
- Bullet for My Valentine
- Busted
- Casino
- Catatonia
- The Charlatans
- The Coral
- Deadbeat Darling
- Delphic
- Devin Townsend
- The Enemy
- Feeder
- Fredrika Stahl
- Funeral for a Friend
- Future of the Left
- GLC
- Iggy Azalea
- Joss Stone
- Kaiser Chiefs
- Laura Marling
- Led Zeppelin
- Manic Street Preachers
- Marti Pellow
- Motorpsycho
- Neck Deep
- Oceansize
- Oasis
- Ozzy Osbourne
- The Pigeon Detectives
- Eugene Francis Jnr
- Robert Plant
- Iggy Pop
- Portishead
- Pulp
- Pretty Violet Stain
- Queen
- Rush
- Simple Minds
- Stereophonics
- Super Furry Animals
- Sylosis
- The Stone Roses
- The View
- Tom Jones
- Twin Peaks
- Yes Sir Boss
