= The Charlatans (English band) =

English alternative rock band

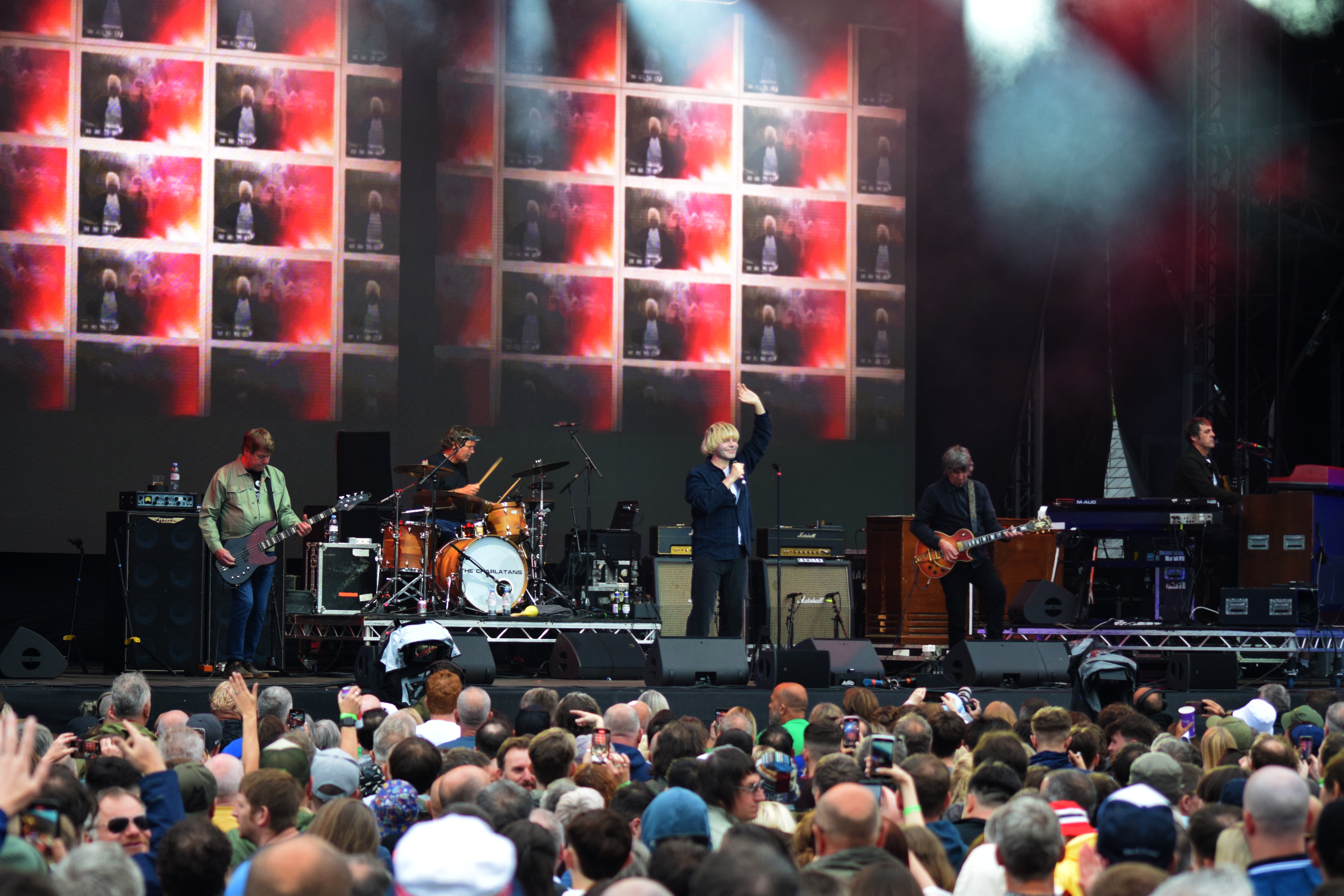
- The Charlatans performing onstage at Scarborough Open Air Theatre, 29th June 2024 The Charlatans performing in June 2024. L to R: Martin Blunt, Peter Salisbury, Tim Burgess, Mark Collins, Tony Rogers

Background information
- Origin: West Midlands, England
- Genres: Alternative rock; indie rock; Mad-chester; baggy; Britpop
- Years active: 1988–present
- Labels: Situation Two; Beggars Banquet; Universal; Sanctuary; Cooking Vinyl; BMG
- Members: Martin Blunt; Tim Burgess; Mark Collins; Tony Rogers
- Past members: Rob Collins; Jon Brookes; Jon Baker; Baz Ketley
- Website: www.thecharlatans.net

The Charlatans (often referred to as the Charlatans UK in the United States) are an English rock band formed in the West Midlands in 1988.

All of the band's thirteen albums have charted in the Top 40 of the UK Albums Chart, with three reaching number 1. They have also achieved twenty-two Top 40 singles in the UK Singles Chart, including the hits "The Only One I Know" and "One to Another".

== History ==
=== Formation (1988–1989) ===
The band were formed in the West Midlands by bassist Martin Blunt, who recruited fellow West Midlanders Rob Collins (keyboards), Jon Brookes (drums), Jon Day (Jonathan Baker) (guitar) and singer-guitarist Baz Ketley. Ketley left the band and was replaced by singer Tim Burgess, who had previously supported the Charlatans with his band, the Electric Crayons.

Although the Charlatans would later become popularly associated with the Madchester scene, the band's early demos recorded in 1988 in Birmingham and Dudley already showcased the sound that would later define their music, characterised by Collins's Hammond organ, underpinned by the driving rhythm section of Blunt's powerful bass and Brookes's drumming. With their sound – a fusion of 1960s soul, R&B and garage rock – inherited from Blunt's earlier 1982 band Makin' Time, the band saw themselves as part of the West Midlands tradition of hard-edged soul and R&B, which included Birmingham bands the Spencer Davis Group and early Dexys Midnight Runners. Blunt has characterised the band's early influences as including the Stranglers, Stax Records, Joy Division and the Doors, but has also credited the band's formation during the explosive growth of the acid house scene as contributing to their sound, explaining that they "suddenly sounded like the Spencer Davis Group on E".

The band relocated to Northwich, Cheshire, the hometown of their manager Steve Harrison and new lead singer Tim Burgess, before the 1990 release of their debut single "Indian Rope". One of the band's earliest known live performances was supporting the Stone Roses at the London School of Economics on 2 December 1988.

=== Early years (1990–1993) ===
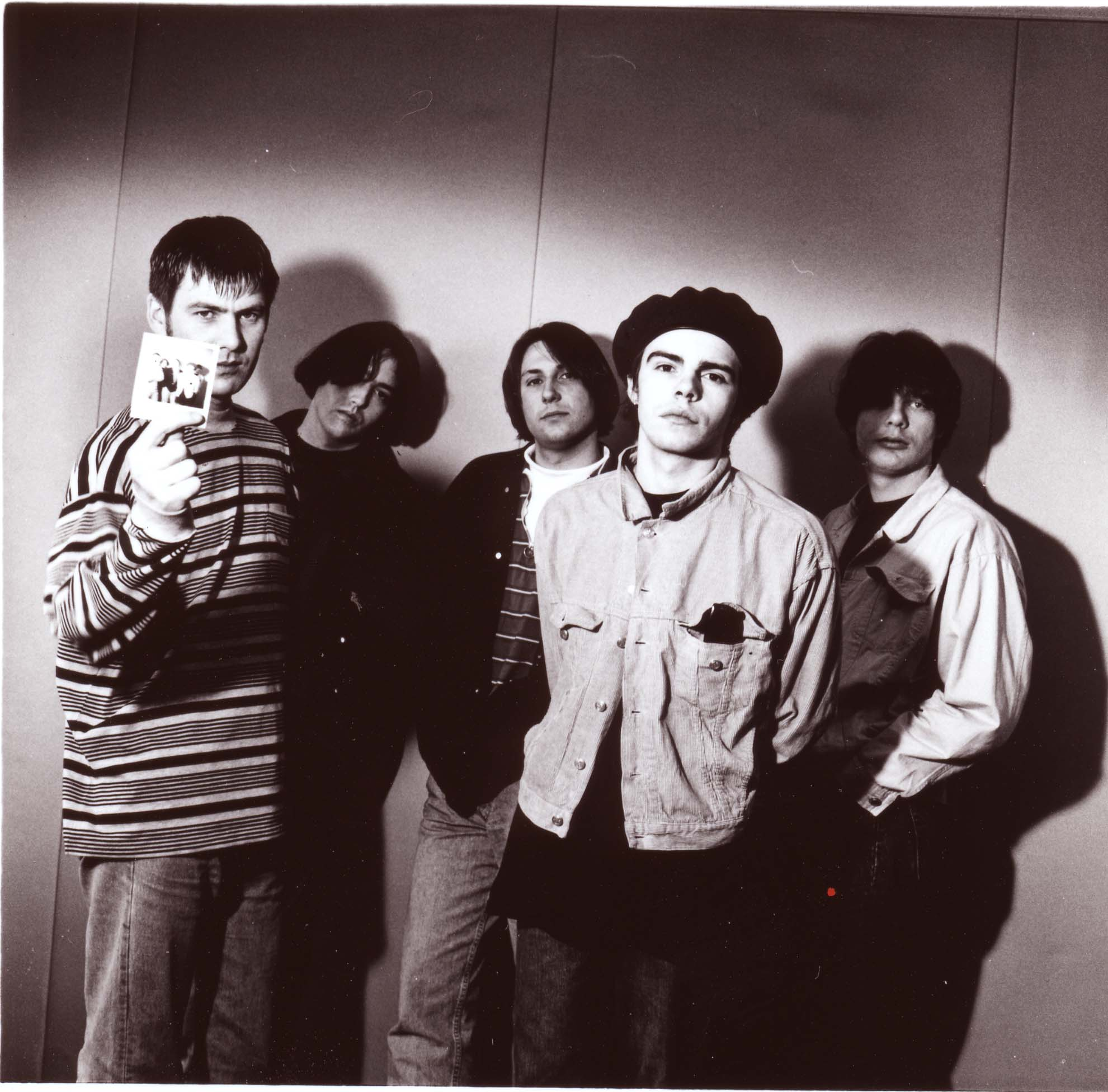
The Charlatans during their early days.

The debut single "Indian Rope" proved to be an indie hit, and the group soon secured a major label in Beggars Banquet offshoot Situation Two, in time for the release of "The Only One I Know", which reached the Top 10 in the UK Singles Chart. A further single, "Then", and their debut album Some Friendly were released later that year. Around this time, the Charlatans were forced to add UK to their name for an American tour due to competing claims by an American rock band also known as the Charlatans.

Baker left the band after the 1991 release of the "Over Rising" single and was replaced by Mark Collins (unrelated to Rob Collins). The band enlisted producer Flood for their second album, Between 10th and 11th (named after the address of the New York Marquee, the venue of the group's first US concert). Released in early 1992, the album failed to reach the Top 20 of the UK Albums Chart, but the Top 20 success of lead single "Weirdo" and a double weekend of gigs ('Daytripper') in Blackpool and Brighton, alongside Ride, helped maintain their visibility in the public eye.

The band suffered a major setback later that year when Rob Collins was charged with armed robbery after a friend had robbed an off licence while Collins waited in the car outside. Collins claimed to have had no prior knowledge of the robbery until he heard a gunshot from inside the shop and saw his friend exit. However, he later admitted that he should not have picked up his friend after realising what he had done. In court, Collins pleaded guilty to the lesser charge of "assisting an offender after an offence" and served four months in prison.

=== Mid-nineties fame (1994–1997) ===
Their third album, Up To Our Hips (1994), reached number 8 on the UK Albums Chart.

In 1995, the release of the band's fourth album, The Charlatans, marked their return to prominence in the UK, topping the UK albums chart and spawning the Top 20 single "Just When You're Thinkin' Things Over".

Keyboard player Rob Collins was killed in a traffic accident on 22 July 1996, during the recording of the band's fifth album, Tellin' Stories. The Charlatans decided to continue, enlisting Primal Scream and former Felt keyboardist Martin Duffy until a permanent replacement for Collins could be found, particularly for their support slot at Oasis' Knebworth concerts, which were just weeks away, scheduled for 10 and 11 August. Tellin' Stories was released in 1997, featuring contributions from both Rob Collins and Duffy. The group achieved their biggest UK hits to date with the singles "One to Another", "North Country Boy" and "How High".

=== Line-up and label changes (1997–2004) ===
After the release of the career-spanning compilation Melting Pot, the band's contract with Beggars Banquet expired, and they signed to Universal Records. Relations with the Beggars label remained strong, however, and the band helped compile the B-sides collection Songs From The Other Side and the DVD Just Lookin' 1990–1997, which showcased all their promotional videos and a selection of live recordings from that era.

Us and Us Only marked the start of a new era for the Charlatans. Their first release for Universal featured new keyboard player Tony Rogers, who made his Charlatans album debut, having previously toured in support of Tellin' Stories and contributed to the B-sides "Keep It to Yourself" and "Clean Up Kid" from the "How High" single. The band embraced a slightly country sound, influenced by Burgess's love of Bob Dylan.

The soul-influenced Wonderland followed in 2001; that year, the band performed at V Festival in London.

The album Up at the Lake was released in 2004.

=== The Sanctuary years (2005–2007) ===
The band released their ninth full-length album on 10 April 2006, their first for new label Sanctuary Records. Titled Simpatico, the reggae- and dub-tinged album was produced by Jim Lowe and included the first single "Blackened Blue Eyes". The single charted at number 28, while the album reached the Top 10 in its debut week before dropping off the charts shortly afterward.

Their follow-up to Simpatico was the career-spanning singles compilation titled Forever: The Singles, released on CD and DVD on 13 November 2006. It was preceded by the single "You're So Pretty – We're So Pretty", remixed by Youth from its original version on Wonderland (2001).

In mid-2007, the band played a number of high-profile gigs, supporting the Who and the Rolling Stones at venues including Wembley Stadium and Twickenham Stadium in London, as well as performing at the Bingley Music Live event, Nass Festival 2007, and at Delamere Forest in Cheshire. A recording of Live at Delamere Forest was released as a five-part download for a limited time via their official website.

=== Cooking Vinyl, nostalgic performances and Brookes's illness (2008–2012) ===
The band contributed the song "Blank Heart, Blank Mind" to a Love Music Hate Racism compilation CD, which was included free with the October 2007 issue of NME. Later that month, the new single "You Cross My Path" was released as a free download, exclusively through the XFM website. A second single, "Oh! Vanity", was released in March 2008, as the Charlatans teamed up with XFM once again, becoming the first UK band to release an album (their tenth studio album, You Cross My Path) as a free download via a radio station. The album also received a physical CD/LP release on the Cooking Vinyl label on 19 May 2008, which coincided with a full UK tour.

Their eleventh studio album, Who We Touch, was released on 6 September 2010 on Cooking Vinyl Records and included the single "Love Is Ending". The album charted at number 21 on the UK Albums Chart. 2010 also marked the twentieth anniversary of the band's debut album, Some Friendly, which they performed live at the Primavera Sound Festival 2010.

On 15 September 2010, drummer Jon Brookes collapsed during a performance in Philadelphia. The remaining US tour dates were postponed, as Brookes was diagnosed with a brain tumour and was flown back to the UK for an operation and a course of radiation and chemotherapy treatment. The Verve's Peter Salisbury acted as a stand-in drummer for the remainder of the Charlatans' UK dates. Brookes returned to the stage for the band's Christmas and New Year's Eve gigs in 2010.

On 28 March 2011, Universal Music re-released a deluxe edition of the band's 1999 album Us and Us Only, featuring a collection of bonus tracks, including B-sides, live recordings, radio sessions, and rare remixes. In March and April 2011, Tim Burgess and Mark Collins played an acoustic tour of the UK, to coincide with which they released an EP, Warm Sounds, featuring six stripped-down and reworked versions of Charlatans tracks, including "North Country Boy", "The Only One I Know" and "Smash The System". In December 2011, the band announced they would be performing Tellin' Stories in its entirety at London's HMV Hammersmith Apollo, O2 Apollo Manchester and Glasgow's Barrowland Ballroom in June 2012.

=== Death of Jon Brookes, Modern Nature, Different Days and A Head Full of Ideas (2013–present) ===
The band returned to their Big Mushroom studio to begin working on demos for a new album in 2013. In May, the Mountain Picnic Blues DVD was released, a documentary about their Tellin' Stories album from its creation in 1997 to the 15th anniversary of the album.

On 13 August 2013, the band's 44-year-old drummer Jon Brookes died from a brain tumour, having undergone several operations and treatments for the condition since his initial diagnosis in 2010. The band paid tribute to him in a special event, with Peter Salisbury playing in his place and bands such as Beady Eye, the Vaccines and Manic Street Preachers also joining the bill. Proceeds from the night went to The Brain Tumour Charity, of which the Charlatans were now patrons; the charity set up the Jon Brookes Fund as a lasting tribute to the drummer.

Tim Burgess confirmed that Brookes's recordings would appear on the band's next album, originally slated for release sometime in 2014.

The Charlatans announced details of their twelfth album, Modern Nature, to be released on 26 January 2015 on their new label BMG Rights Management. Featuring eleven new tracks (including the recent limited edition 7-inch "Talking in Tones"), Modern Nature was produced by the Charlatans and Jim Spencer and mixed by Craig Silvey. The album features contributions from the band's temporary drummers Peter Salisbury (of the Verve), Stephen Morris (of New Order) and Gabriel Gurnsey (of Factory Floor), as well as producer Dave Tolan, backing singers Melanie Marshall and Sandra Marvin, strings by Sean O'Hagan and brass courtesy of Jim Paterson from Dexys Midnight Runners.

The group's thirteenth album, Different Days, was released on 26 May 2017.

In July 2021, the group announced the release of A Head Full of Ideas: The Best of Charlatans, which was released on 15 October 2021.

On 1 June 2022, the group supported Liam Gallagher at his concert at the Etihad Stadium in Manchester.

On 16 July 2022, the group supported Gerry Cinnamon at his concert at Hampden Park in Glasgow.

Burgess announced the band was back with new music on his X (formerly Twitter) account on 12 July 2025, and the title track for their fourteenth album "We Are Love" was released as the lead single on 14 July. The album was released on 31 October 2025.

== Band members ==
Current members

- Martin Blunt – bass (1988–present)
- Tim Burgess – lead vocals, harmonica, auxiliary percussion, acoustic guitar (1989–present)
- Mark Collins – guitar, pedal steel guitar (1991–present)
- Tony Rogers – keyboards, backing vocals (1997–present)

Current touring member

- Peter Salisbury – drums, percussion (2010–present)

Former members

- Jon Brookes – drums, percussion (1988–2010; died 2013)
- Rob Collins – keyboards, organ, piano, backing vocals (1988–96; his death)
- Jon Baker – guitar (1988–91)
- Baz Ketley – lead vocals, guitar (1988–89)

Former touring member

- Martin Duffy – keyboards, organ, piano, mellotron (1996–97; died 2022)

Timeline

== Discography ==
- Some Friendly (1990)
- Between 10th and 11th (1992)
- Up to Our Hips (1994)
- The Charlatans (1995)
- Tellin' Stories (1997)
- Us and Us Only (1999)
- Wonderland (2001)
- Up at the Lake (2004)
- Simpatico (2006)
- You Cross My Path (2008)
- Who We Touch (2010)
- Modern Nature (2015)
- Different Days (2017)
- We Are Love (2025)

== Sources ==
- Wills, D. The Charlatans: The authorised history, Virgin Books, 1999. ISBN 0-7535-0194-5
