= Then (The Charlatans song) =

1990 single by the Charlatans

Single by the Charlatans

from the album Some Friendly
- B-side: "Taurus Moaner"
- Released: 10 September 1990
- Studio: The Winding (Wrexham, Wales)
- Length: 4:11
- Label: Situation Two
- Songwriters: Martin Blunt; Jon Brookes; Tim Burgess; Rob Collins
- Producer: Chris Nagle

The Charlatans singles chronology
| "The Only One I Know" (1990) | "Then" (1990) | "Sproston Green" (1991) |

Music video
- "Then" on YouTube

"Then" is a song by English alternative rock band the Charlatans. It was released on 10 September 1990 as the second single from the group's debut album, Some Friendly (1990). The song reached number 12 on the UK Singles Chart, number 11 on the Irish Singles Chart, and number four on the US Billboard Modern Rock Tracks chart.

== Music video ==
The music video for "Then" was directed by Kim Peters in her second video with the band and shot at Hawkstone Park Hotel and Golf Course in Rural Shropshire, England. The band's then-keyboardist Rob Collins was ill on the day of filming, and a friend mimed in his place. Other parts of the video show the band performing on a hillside in Shropshire that is partly obscured by smoke. The Charlatans used this location for the architectural "follies" that are dotted around the grounds of Hawkstone Park.

== Track listings ==
7-inch and cassette single

1. "Then"
2. "Taurus Moaner"

12-inch single

1. "Then"
2. "Taurus Moaner"
3. "Then" (alternate take)
4. "Taurus Moaner" (instrumental)

CD single

1. "Then"
2. "Taurus Moaner"
3. "Taurus Moaner" (instrumental)
4. "Then" (alternate take)

== Charts ==
=== Weekly charts ===
| Chart (1990) | Peak position |
|---|---|
| Australia (ARIA) | 104 |
| Ireland (IRMA) | 11 |
| UK Singles (Official Charts) | 12 |
| US Modern Rock Tracks (Billboard) | 4 |

=== Year-end charts ===
| Chart (1991) | Position |
|---|---|
| US Modern Rock Tracks (Billboard) | 15 |

== Release history ==
| Region | Date | Format(s) | Label(s) | Ref. |
|---|---|---|---|---|
| United Kingdom | 10 September 1990 | 7-inch vinyl; 12-inch vinyl; CD; cassette | Situation Two | |
| Australia | 5 November 1990 | 7-inch vinyl; 12-inch vinyl; cassette | Situation Two; RCA; Beggars Banquet | |
