= Just When You're Thinkin' Things Over =

Single by The Charlatans

from the album The Charlatans
- Released: 7 August 1995
- Recorded: 1994
- Genre: Alternative rock
- Length: 4:51
- Label: Beggars Banquet Records
- Songwriter(s): Blunt, Brookes, Burgess, M. Collins, R. Collins
- Producer(s): The Charlatans, Dave Charles

The Charlatans singles chronology
| "Just Lookin'" / "Bullet Comes" (1995) | "Just When You're Thinkin' Things Over" (1995) | "One to Another" (1996) |

"Just When You're Thinkin' Things Over" was a 1995 single by the English indie band The Charlatans, released from their self-titled fourth album. It peaked at No. 12 on the UK Singles Chart.

== Track listing ==
CD

1. "Just When You're Thinkin' Things Over" - 4:51
2. "Chemical Risk" (Toothache Remix) - 3:41 (Remixed by The Chemical Brothers)
3. "Frinck" - 4:38
4. "Your Skies Are Mine" - 3:56

12"

1. "Just When You're Thinkin' Things Over"
2. "Frinck"
3. "Chemical Risk Dub" (Toothache Remix) (Remixed by The Chemical Brothers)
4. "Nine Acre Dust" (Remixed by The Chemical Brothers)
