= Rob Collins (musician) =

English keyboardist (1963–1996)

- Born: Robert James Collins; 23 February 1963; Rowley Regis, Staffordshire, England
- Died: 22 July 1996 (aged 33) Near Monmouth, Wales
- Occupation: Keyboardist
- Years active: 1988–1996

Robert James Collins (23 February 1963 – 22 July 1996) was an English musician best known as the original keyboardist of The Charlatans.

== The Charlatans ==
Collins was born in Rowley Regis, Staffordshire and grew up in Willenhall and was recruited to join The Charlatans in the late 1980s. The band's debut single "Indian Rope" was an indie hit, and led the way for their debut top ten single "The Only One I Know" in 1990. Collins' swirling and layered psychedelic organ playing added an important and noted edge to the band's sound and placed the band apart from many of their baggy contemporaries and he was the band's main songwriter. He recorded five successful albums with the band.

== Imprisonment ==
On 3 December 1992, Collins was arrested and charged with armed robbery on an off-licence near his home. Collins had been driving with a friend, who performed the robbery when Collins was waiting in his car outside. Collins claimed to have no foreknowledge of the robbery until he heard a gunshot inside the shop and his friend exited, although later admitted that he should not have picked his friend up after he realised what he had done. In court Collins pleaded guilty to "Assisting an offender after an offence", for which he was sentenced to eight months' imprisonment. His former charge of "armed robbery" (resulting in a possible sentence of eight years or more) was dropped in court. Collins served four months of his sentence and was released in early 1994.

== Death ==
Collins began to record keyboard and organ parts for The Charlatans' fifth album, Tellin' Stories, but was killed in a car crash on 22 July 1996, just before sessions were completed. He was driving his BMW 520i on the B4233, a country road north of Monmouth near Rockfield Studios where the album was being recorded. An investigation into the accident showed that Collins had consumed a sizable amount of alcohol and was not wearing a seatbelt. He died from head injuries on the roadside shortly after the accident, having been thrown through the sunroof. Investigators concluded that he probably would not have died had he worn a seatbelt.

The music industry and his colleagues were greatly shocked by his sudden loss. The band had had to cancel their support date at Loch Lomond, and put out a statement saying that they were "devasted with the loss" and that he was a "great and loyal" friend. Melody Maker featured tributes from Noel Gallagher, Mani, The Chemical Brothers and Wags from Black Grape.

At Knebworth in August, which the band were able to play with a stand-in, Oasis's lead singer Liam Gallagher said "live forever, mate" as a dedication to Collins and introduction to their song "Cast No Shadow".
