= Mark Collins (musician) =

English musician (born 1965)

- Collins performing in 2008

Background information
- Birth name: Mark Vincent Collins
- Born: 14 August 1965 (age 60); Whalley Range, Manchester, England
- Genres: Alternative rock, indie rock, indie pop, Madchester, Britpop
- Occupation(s): Musician, songwriter
- Instrument(s): Guitar, pedal steel
- Years active: 1984–present
- Member of: The Charlatans
- Formerly of: The Waltones
- Website: thecharlatans.net

Mark Vincent Collins (born 14 August 1965) is an English musician, best known as having been the guitarist of the British alternative rock band the Charlatans since 1991.

== Career ==
Collins attended school with future Oasis guitarist Paul "Bonehead" Arthurs. He began his music career in 1986 as guitarist with The Waltones, indie pop band based in Manchester. After the recording of their second album in 1990, drummer Alex Fyans left the group and the band relaunched themselves as Candlestick Park. The band split up a year later. Collins joined The Charlatans in 1991 after Jon Baker's departure.

"I just went down there thinking the Charlatans wanted a second guitarist. I turned up with my guitar at a rehearsal room in Birmingham; there was no other guitarist there and they just said "Do you fancy joining the band?" I said "Oh. Go on then, why not?" It all happened really quickly." ~ Mark Collins

Collins made his debut on a non-album single, "Me. In Time", and while the band was not satisfied with the release itself, he has remained with them ever since.

In 2003, he produced the track "Same Sad Story" from Adam Masterson's debut album, which was released as a single later in November that year. Same year, Collins joined Starsailor, playing additional and lead guitar on their nationwide UK tour and the Isle of Wight Festival later in 2005.

Friend and fan of The Rolling Stones' Ronnie Wood, Collins shared guitar with him on several events such as the Hero2Hero gigs, Shepherd's Bush Empire and Fleadh Festival in 2004.

== Personal life ==
Mark Collins has five children: Ella (born 1998), Stanley (born 1999), Lois (born 2003), Martha (born 2019), and Gabriel (born 2024).
