= You Cross My Path =

Studio album by the Charlatans
- Released: 3 March 2008
- Recorded: Hollywood, California; Blessington, Ireland; Big Mushroom, Cheshire
- Genres: Electro; pop
- Length: 36:40
- Labels: Self-released; Cooking Vinyl
- Producers: Tony Rogers; The Charlatans

The Charlatans chronology
Forever: The Singles (2006)	You Cross My Path (2008)	Who We Touch (2010)

Singles from You Cross My Path
- 1. "You Cross My Path" Released: 22 October 2007; 2. "Oh! Vanity" Released: 25 February 2008; 3. "The Misbegotten" Released: 5 May 2008; 4. "Mis-Takes" Released: 14 July 2008

You Cross My Path is the tenth studio album by British rock band the Charlatans, released on 3 March 2008 as a free download from radio station Xfm's website. Following promotion for the band's ninth studio album, Simpatico (2006), frontman Tim Burgess and manager Alan McGee devised an idea to give away their music for free. Guitarist Mark Collins and keyboardist Tony Rogers visited Burgess in Los Angeles, California, where they would write new material, and followed this up with jam sessions with the whole band in early 2007. Recording sessions were split across Hollywood, California, Blessington, Ireland, and Cheshire, Greater Manchester, with Rogers given a separate producer credit independent of the band. You Cross My Path is an electro and pop album that evokes the work of Kasabian, New Order, and Simple Minds. Following the reggae direction of Simpatico, Rogers' organ returned to the forefront of the band's sound on You Cross My Path.

You Cross My Path received generally favourable reviews from music critics, many of whom praised the songwriting, though some were less enthusiastic about its quality. It charted at number 25 in Scotland, number 39 in the United Kingdom, and number 96 in Ireland. After their former label folded, the Charlatans announced their decision to release the album for free. Some writers thought they were copying Radiohead, who announced on the same day that they would be doing that strategy with In Rainbows (2007). "You Cross My Path" was released as the lead single from the album of the same name in October 2007 and was promoted with a tour of the UK the following month. "Oh! Vanity" was released as its second single in February 2008, followed by "The Misbegotten" in May 2008. You Cross My Path was released physically through Cooking Vinyl that same month, and the Charlatans toured the UK in support of it. "Mis-Takes" appeared as the fourth single from it in July 2008; over the next two months, they played at a few festivals and held a live show in New Zealand at the end of the year.

== Background and development ==
The Charlatans released their ninth studio album, Simpatico, in April 2006 through Creole and Sanctuary Records. It peaked at number ten on the UK Albums Chart, while one of its singles, "Blackened Blue Eyes", charted within the top 30 of the UK Singles Chart. A month later, it was reported that the band left their long-serving manager Steve Harrison in favour of Stephen King and former Creation Records owner Alan McGee, both of Creation Management. McGee's first suggestion as a manager was for the band to do a greatest hits tour. Shortly afterwards, frontman Tim Burgess decided to give up drinking and doing drugs, eventually going through a detox programme. Following this, the band went on a tour of the United States to promote the album and then appeared at the Oxegen, T in the Park, and V Festivals. In October 2006, Burgess and McGee went on a DJ tour, which the former saw as a bonding event between the pair that would help them map out the band's future plans.

During this time, Burgess realised that the Internet was gaining momentum as a self-promotional tool, with the pair having used Myspace to promote their tour. He was aware that Pete Doherty of the Libertines, which McGee used to manage, would post various live or demo recordings online for others to check out. Fans enjoyed this; Burgess commented that these were early indications that record labels were not required to release music into the wider world. He noted that listeners were "plundering the internet" to acquire music via peer-to-peer file sharing websites. McGee similarly arrived at the conclusion that no one was purchasing CDs, saying that people preferred to download music online. While on the tour, Burgess and McGee came up with the suggestion of giving away the Charlatans' new music to others. The band considered several proposals, including working with Sanctuary again, signing to a different label, or founding their own label. After ultimately deciding on giving away music, they made some terms to stick to: they needed it to be the best album they could write; it had to be given away to the highest number of people as was possible; and they had to "go into it wholeheartedly".

== Writing and recording ==
In November 2006, their third compilation album Forever. The Singles was released, promoted with a UK tour until the end of the year. It included a remix of one of their earlier tracks, "You're So Pretty –We're So Pretty" from their seventh album Wonderland (2001), done by Martin "Youth" Glover. Burgess said he altered the speed of it, which gave Burgess the idea that their next album should have a faster tempo. When asked if they would follow the sound of Simpatico, Burgess responded that they would be following the compilation, as there were "[t]oo many dark thoughts around [the making of Simpatico,] so we want get away from that." They planned to record with Youth or Wonderland producer Danny Saber; when hearing a demo of "You Cross My Path", McGee also proposed Alan Moulder. Burgess said that McGee wanted them to release another new album by mid-2007, which Burgess thought was not an ideal deadline. In January 2007, guitarist Mark Collins went to meet Burgess in Los Angeles, California; keyboardist Tony Rogers also visited for a week. The two stayed at a flat on the corner of the Sunset and Vine Streets, which Burgess would visit to work on material and McGee supervised. Burgess thought it was an appropriate place to work on their next album, as "Sunset & Vine" had been the name of the final track on Simpatico.

The Charlatans then held jamming sessions throughout February 2007. Surrounding supporting shows for the Who, the Charlatans played a one-off headlining show at Delamere Forest in Cheshire, Greater Manchester, in June 2007. Recording sessions were done in Hollywood, California, Blessington, Ireland, and at Big Mushroom Studios in Cheshire; the album's booklet gives Rogers a separate producer credit independent of the band. Discussing the varied locations they worked in, he explained that they had a computer and recording gear and made it wherever they decided to visit, using the Logic Pro DAW software. As Burgess watched Rogers use it, he got a copy of the programme for himself and became accustomed to it in between past tours. While this was occurring, Burgess and his wife Michelle stayed at the K West Hotel in London for around six months, which was a hotbed for individuals in the music industry. As Tim Burgess would be busy with recording, Michelle Burgess passed the time drinking with William Reid of the Jesus and Mary Chain and the manager of Evan Dando. On one occasion, Tim Burgess went to record in Birmingham, only to return to find his wife still partying, unaware that he had been absent. By October 2007, mixing was underway, with Moulder doing the majority of the recordings at Assault & Battery Studios in London, while James Spencer mixed "A Day for Letting Go" and "Bird" at Big Mushroom. Burgess was excited about working with Moulder, name-checking the latter's involvement in Loveless (1991) by My Bloody Valentine. Moulder was initially unsure about the mixing until McGee convinced him to do it.

== Composition and lyrics ==
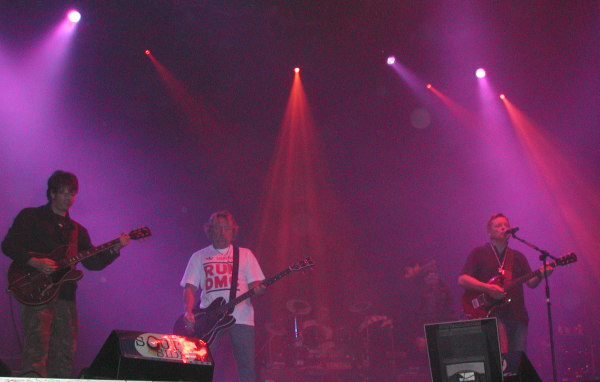
Several aspects of You Cross My Path were compared to the music of New Order (pictured), such as the overall sound, Blunt's basslines, and Burgess' lyrics.

Musically, the sound of You Cross My Path has been described as electro and pop, taking influence from krautrock, compared to the work of Kasabian, New Order, and Simple Minds. Burgess attributed the electronic textures to him listening to krautrock acts Kraftwerk and Neu! and admitted that it was heavily inspired by New Order. After the diversion to reggae on Simpatico, Rogers' organ returned to the forefront for You Cross My Path. AllMusic reviewer Stephen Thomas Erlewine said it continues the foundation set by their fifth album, Tellin' Stories (1997), re-treading that release's mixture of "contemporary and classic, perhaps even gently favoring the modern as this does emphasize sound over song." Burgess wanted the album's title to be The Gothic Wild West, in the vein of actor Sergio Leone, but this was vetoed by the other members. Burgess' lyrics, which tackled break-up and being disaffected, recalled those of New Order frontman Bernard Sumner. In addition to this, Blunt's bass parts were also compared to those by New Order member Peter Hook.

For the album's opening track, "Oh! Vanity", they had written the first verse before going to a party hosted by the William Morris Agency. Three members of the band attended; two of the lines refer to Burgess meeting Paris Hilton at said party. It has a groove in the vein of Booker T. & the M.G.'s and a wordless chorus section; its two-chord progression recalled the work of Elbow, while the keyboards were in the style of the Killers. The Independent critic Andy Gill wrote that it had a "propulsive motorik groove wreathed in swirling con-trails of psych-rock synthesiser". "Bad Days" is an up-tempo pop rock and synth-pop track that Gill said was full of "skittish disco hi-hats, striding bass and [an] electropop synth motif". Blunt and Rogers wrote the first idea that would evolve into the final song in the latter's basement; Rogers would also start the lyrics that Burgess subsequently finished and would include a reference to the Cure. "Mis-Takes" exemplifies the New Order comparison, coming across as a mix of that act's songs "Blue Monday" (1983) and "World (The Price of Love)" (1993). Burgess explained that it was a vitriolic track about a person who once threatened him while at a bus stop. Erlewine wrote that it has a cold keyboard atmosphere that "uncannily sounds like a new wave relic" without disregarding the band's signature grooves.

"The Misbegotten" recalled the Charlatans' 1995 self-titled album and was influenced by Doris Norton, whose electronic music Burgess admired. He used William S. Burroughs' cut-up technique for the lyrics; it details an instance where a man approached Burgess at a party and proceeded to offer him the chance at sex with his wife, much to Burgess' discomfort. "A Day for Letting Go" is a mid-tempo track focused on Rogers' organ, which Burgess said was about having one's soul crushed. He wrote the lyrics, which were influenced by the Shangri-Las, during New Year's Eve 2007 while in Texas; Blunt referred to them as "The Doors meet The Ronettes with an acid twist." Discussing "You Cross My Path", Burgess said there were a "few unsavoury characters" in the music industry, and this track was a "handy shot across their bows". Influenced by his sobriety, it included lines taken from The Exorcist (1973) and references to the Bible. The Austin Chronicle writer Marc Savlov said it starts with an acid-like "barrage of electro before segueing into more familiar, Pacific Coast Highway rock-out territory". Burgess acknowledged that it shared the same chord progression with "Circus of Death" (1978) by the Human League and "Sunrise" (1985) by New Order, and that the drum beat was a pre-set pattern on Logic Pro.

Blunt and Rogers intentionally wrote "Missing Beats (Of a Generation)" as a short song so that people would listen to it more. The lyrics, which talk about a person having sex while in their youth, included a reference to DNA, while a section of its melody cribbed "Primary" (1981) by the Cure. "My Name Is Despair", which is done in the style of Depeche Mode, starts with noise from a street in Manchester over a sample of "Reality Asylum" (1978) by Crass. It began as a jam session between Blunt and Brooks, which Burgess subsequently re-wrote in Los Angeles. It had a title that Burgess felt was akin to the "name of a pulp novel or a vengeful western". Talking about the lyrics, he said he was "leaving an old life behind. I felt my previous experience was like a sea in which I was caught in the swell", being influenced by Southern Gothic fiction. Samar Grewal of Rolling Stone India said it was a "modal sonic exploration", complete with the "hum and drone of guitars, freely interweaving organ, low piano notes, even ululation, all tied together by nifty hi-hat and cymbal work," comparing it to "Trainspotting" (1997) by Primal Scream. "Bird", which was written over the course of a week, echoed the sound of the Charlatans shoegaze contemporaries in the early 1990s, namely Swervedriver. With it, Burgess began pondering if his "best days were behind me"; he stylised the word in all-capital letters as a reference to David Lynch using uppercasing in his film Inland Empire (2006). With the album's closing track, "This Is the End", Burgess said he had "Tears" (1986) by the Chameleons in mind and that they were trying to emulate "The End" (1967) by the Doors. The lyrics were reminiscent of the work of William Wordsworth, while the music was styled after the Verve.

== Release ==
Why would you volunteer to join the army for 10 years unless you had no choice? Record companies are kind of like the army – very regulated. We were really excited when Xfm got behind us and were as enthusiastic about the download as we are.

— Manager Alan McGee in 2008 on his rationale behind releasing the album as a free download

=== Free download ===
In September 2007, Sanctuary Records shuttered operations after being bought by Universal Music Group. Burgess mentioned that they had left Sanctuary because they were not happy with their contract. On 1 October 2007, Exclaim! reported that the band would be giving away their upcoming album as a free download in partnership with the radio station Xfm. McGee theorised that this could be a business model in the future, reasoning that the band would receive more money from gig attendees, people purchasing their merchandise, and publishing fees regardless. Head of Music at Xfm Mike Walsh thought it would be a worthwhile endeavour, something that he also thought would happen more often in the future, and agreed that it could help with live performances. Some months prior, Prince had given away Planet Earth (2007) in the ballpark of three million copies as part of an effort with The Mail on Sunday. This, in turn, became a driving factor in ticket sales for his residency of record-setting shows at The O2 Arena in London.

While Burgess thought it was an odd choice to go with The Mail on Sunday, McGee proposed to collaborate with The Sun, which the rest of the Charlatans were unsure about. As part of the promotion, the radio station would be releasing interviews with Burgess and McGee; the pair would be featured together on ITV News at Ten. Burgess said the band wished for the listeners to have ownership of their music, and they "wanted the artists – us – to own the copyright". He said that being without a label meant that they could release music as soon as they finished making it and not have to wait for other parties to be involved. Burgess claimed it was "an industry first – we're the first people to do this", highlighting the decline of CD sales. That same day, Radiohead announced that they would be doing the same thing with their album In Rainbows (2007). In an interview from early 2008, Burgess said they had the idea of giving it away before they had begun writing material for it, while the concept for Radiohead to do it had been proposed since April 2007. The director general of the Entertainment Retailers Association, Kim Bayley, said this method would stall upcoming acts' ability to make money from putting their music on sale. She warned that music could be viewed as something disposable in the near future.

=== Initial promotion ===
"You Cross My Path" was released as the album's lead single digitally on 22 October 2007; its music video was directed by Charles Mehling, who was one of Burgess' first friends in Los Angeles and only charged them one tenth of his usual fee. In November 2007, the band embarked on a three-date tour of the UK, which saw the debut of four songs from the forthcoming album. On 3 January 2008, You Cross My Path was formerly announced for release as a free download in two months' time. Alongside this, the album's track listing was posted online. "Oh! Vanity" was released as the second single digitally on 25 February 2008; its music video was directed by Douglas Hart and starred Peaches Geldof. Hart wanted it to be akin to the ending of Carrie (1976), though without the blood featured in that film's conclusion. The free download of You Cross My Path was made available through Xfm's website on 3 March 2008; four days later, it was reported that it had been downloaded over 60,000 times, which would have reached the number two position on the UK album chart had it been eligible. Burgess said it was estimated that the rate of sales to peer-to-peer file sharing was 1:60, meaning that for each CD or digital download of an album sold, it would be shared illegally between 60 individuals. He was appreciative of this reaction, while McGee remarked, "No longer does music have to work in the traditional major-label dominated way."

You Cross My Path was made available through the band's own website on 17 March 2008, and was promoted with a one-off show at the London branch of the Hard Rock Cafe on 24 April 2008. By May 2008, the downloads had reached over 90,000. In his autobiography Telling Stories (2012), Burgess said the figure rose above 150,000. Gigwise's Jon Bye felt that the "limited offering of this very album as a free download [...] failed to have the same impact as the likes of Radiohead or Nine Inch Nails." BBC Music writer Chris Jones, musicOMH contributor Ben Hogwood, and Gill thought the band were copying Radiohead's strategy, as the latter remarked: "Radiohead's internet initiative is starting to be followed by other acts, with varying degrees of success." Erlewine said the band felt compelled to release it this way as they needed a method to announce their return and to seize the "attention of onetime fans who had long ago stopped paying attention to the group." Burgess said Radiohead's method involved asking for the downloader's email address, which he said differed from the band's approach as they took zero information from people. The Sunday Telegraph writer Juliette Garside noted that In Rainbows had a compulsory charge, albeit a handling fee of 45p for credit card purchases.

=== Subsequent promotion ===
"The Misbegotten" was released as the third single from You Cross My Path on 5 May 2008. "Blank Heart, Blank Mind" and "Set Me Free" were included on the CD version, while a remix of "The Misbegotten" was featured on the seven-inch vinyl edition. Initially scheduled for 12 May 2008, You Cross My Path was released physically on CD and vinyl through Cooking Vinyl on 19 May 2008, while the US release occurred on 10 June 2008. For the artwork, Burgess wanted a cat on the cover and approached Faris Badwan of the Horrors about designing it. The artwork was not in their minds when they decided to make the album for free, prompting them to tell Badwan that he had to make it within a few days. Burgess came across Badwan at an exhibition he had hosted. Badwan drew five cats that were intended to represent each member of the band. Throughout May 2008, the band embarked on a tour of the UK. Coinciding with this, Burgess ran a two-week podcast about how the tour was progressing, talks with other members, and general banter.

Prior to a European tour, McGee quit his manager role in the midst of wanting to leave the music business. He had sent an email to Burgess, who was unable to check his inbox due to limited access to the internet. It was not until when the band was in Berlin, Germany, that Burgess got in contact; he found out that Michelle and McGee had gotten into a disagreement. As she felt that Burgess was not sticking up for her, the two did not talk for a week. He was unsure about the full events that unfolded but alleged that Michelle made remarks about McGee's family. In June 2008, the band played a one-off show at Cannock Chase Forest in Staffordshire. On 1 July 2008, the live EP ...Live at IndigO2 was released, which included versions of "Oh! Vanity", "Bad Days", "The Misbegotten", and "This Is the End". "Mis-Takes" was released as the fourth single from You Cross My Path on 14 July 2008; "Complete Control" and "It's What It Is, It's What It Was" were included on the iTunes Store version.

Over the next two months, they performed at the T in the Park and V Festivals and headlined Ben & Jerry's festival. In October 2008, the band went on another tour of the UK. Originally planned for release on 20 October 2008, "Oh! Vanity" was reissued physically on 3 November 2008. "Complete Control" and live versions of "The Only One I Know" (1990) and "Oh! Vanity" were included on the CD edition; people that bought the single on CD, seven-inch vinyl, and digital download were given a cover of "Murder" (1984) by New Order. Later in November 2008, the band performed their first ever show in New Zealand. In May 2009, they performed at The Great Escape Festival. The following month, the band headlined a stage, which they helped curate, at the Isle of Wight Festival. Throughout July and August 2009, the band performed at a variety of festivals, including GuilFest and Summer Sundae. The band had planned to go on a tour of the US and Canada, but this was cancelled as Brookes required shoulder surgery.

"Oh! Vanity" was later featured on the band's fifth compilation album, A Head Full of Ideas (2021).

== Reception ==
Professional ratings
Aggregate scores
Source	Rating
Metacritic	69/100
Review scores
Source	Rating
AllMusic	4/5 stars
The Austin Chronicle	3/5 stars
Drowned in Sound	5/10
Gigwise	3.5/5 stars
The Independent	4/5 stars
musicOMH	3/5 stars
The Observer	4/5 stars
Pitchfork	6/10
PopMatters	8/10
Yahoo! Launch	5/10 stars

You Cross My Path was met with generally favourable reviews from music critics. At Metacritic, which assigns a normalised rating out of 100 to reviews from mainstream publications, the album received an average score of 69, based on 14 reviews.

Many reviewers praised the songwriting, going as far as to call it the band's best release in several years. Erlewine said they boost the "rhythms and tak[e] risks in their production, all without abandoning the classicist structures they've relied upon" since their self-titled album. He felt that the tracks "aren't growers, they're immediate -- but what is compelling is the variety of sounds," as they took "risks again without losing their identity." Michaela Annot of Drowned in Sound wrote that the album "chooses to resolutely endorse the same style of music that they've offering up for the past twenty years." Her sole issue was Burgess' "vocal delivery and maudlin lyrics", and while it was not an "invigorating brew," the mix of "swirling Hammond and ponderous bass and drums stays on the right side of tepid most of the time." Gill called it a "triumphant reaffirmation of the band's essential qualities", adding that "whatever betrayal or disappointment Burgess has suffered, it clearly hasn't dimmed either his spirit or the band's knack for engaging melodies." John Bergstrom of PopMatters wrote that it was the band's "best album in a decade, not to mention one of the best albums of the year, is a bit of a surprise." He mentioned that "whether it's sheer desperation, reinvigoration, or both, they sound more confident than they have since their heyday." The Line of Best Fit writer Rich Thane, whose interest in the band waned over the years, was surprised by it, saying that they "reinvented themselves once more." The Observer writer Jim Butler said that the band "ha[s] never been afraid of proclaiming their influences", showcasing here the influence from New Order, and "the result [...] is a melodic and hard-fought triumph."

Other critics were less enthusiastic about the songwriting. Savlov thought that the album served as its "own tribute LP, layering the best bits" of Burgess' "emotionally disconnected couplets atop the band's trademark soaring keyboards and insistently hummable guitars." Pitchfork contributor Ian Cohen thought it was "possibly their strongest work since Tellin' Stories" but was unsure if it was a causality of the "times or its own merits; it's the sort of thing that's so competent that it's more likely to be defined by its failures than its success." Hogwood thought that "Oh! Vanity" and "Mis-Takes" were "easily the two most memorable tracks on the album, which isn't to say the rest are all filler - they're just not quite as memorable." Bye wrote that it was "crushingly middle of the road" with a "degree of flabby excess around the edges." Despite this, he said that the band delivered a "really quite capturing release", which "more than proves that The Charlatans are still worth taking a note of." Yahoo! Launch's Jason Draper said that there was "nothing wrong with paying respect to past loves, but it's not enough to be Manchester's indie survivors simply replicating 'Madchester' club sounds. [...] [I]t's hard to see this crossing the path of anyone outside of the devoted." Pras Rajagopalan of Exclaim! wrote that it was not worth purchasing physically as the band "miss[ed] the mark here in so many ways, be it the tepid songwriting, the production that makes the band's rhythm section sound like a limp-wristed afterthought", or their affirmation on revisiting the "same ground they did ten years ago."

Following the album's physical release, You Cross My Path peaked at number 39 in the UK. It also charted at number 25 in Scotland and number 96 in Ireland. "The Misbegotten" reached number five on the UK Indie Singles Chart, while "Oh! Vanity" peaked at number two on the same chart.

=== Legacy ===
In the following years, several authors commented on the Charlatans' decision to release You Cross My Path for free. In his book Last Shop Standing: Whatever Happened to Record Shops? (2009) about record stores, author Graham Jones lamented the declining sales of CDs in independent shops, writing that the situation "would be even worse" if acts followed Charlatans' directive. He noted that while the band was happy with receiving 30,000 fans to download it, the only individual that would not be was their "accountant who saw them get zero pounds in sales for an album that cost thousands to record. [...] Many artist can achieve 30,000 downloads if the music is free". In The Entertainment Industry: An Introduction (2010), co-authors Stuart Moss and Stephen Henderson contrasted Radiohead's choice on In Rainbows with the Charlatans' You Cross My Path, writing, "these approaches support a viewpoint that some artists have decided that it is important to get the music in the hands of music fans as this should lead to packed concerts where profit can be made". Matthew David expanded on this in Peer to Peer and the Music Industry: The Criminalization of Sharing (2010), as he said fans "demanded to pay for both" the album and their live shows. He referred to this as an "extreme example of reterritorialization," the emphasis on live gigs mixing with "relegitimation of the payment for recordings which come direct from the artists, and for which payment" is given to bands.

In 2020, Burgess remarked that it "felt like quite a radical, punk thing to do. [...] We got a million downloads and got to play in Australia for the first time on the back of it, so something good came out of it." Actor Joaquin Phoenix expressed admiration for the album and would eventually work with Burgess for two months on some songs a few years later.

== Track listing ==
All songs written by Martin Blunt, Jon Brookes, Tim Burgess, Mark Collins, and Tony Rogers.

1. "Oh! Vanity" – 3:57
2. "Bad Days" – 3:28
3. "Mis-Takes" – 3:25
4. "The Misbegotten" – 4:13
5. "A Day for Letting Go" – 2:52
6. "You Cross My Path" – 4:05
7. "Missing Beats (Of a Generation)" – 3:38
8. "My Name Is Despair" – 4:19
9. "Bird" – 2:38
10. "This Is the End" – 4:28

Deluxe Edition Disc 2

1. "A Margin Of Sanity"
2. "Acid In The Tea"
3. "You Cross My Path (Live at Madrid Joy Eslava)"
4. "Bad Days (Live at Millan Magazini Generali)"
5. "Mis-Takes (Live at Glasgow ABC)"
6. "Oh! Vanity (Live at Manchester Ritz)"
7. "This Is The End (Live at London Shepherd's Bush Empire)"
8. " You Cross My Path (Video)"
9. "Oh Vanity! (Video)"

== Personnel ==
Personnel per booklet.

The Charlatans

- Martin Blunt – bass guitar
- Jon Brookes – drums
- Tim Burgess – lead vocals
- Mark Collins – guitars
- Tony Rogers – keyboards

Production and design

- Tony Rogers – producer
- The Charlatans – producer
- Alan Moulder – mixing (all except tracks 5 and 9)
- James Spencer – mixing (tracks 5 and 9)
- Faris Badwan – artwork
- Jenny Hardcore – artwork, photography
- Tim Burgess – artwork
- Colin Sheehy – artwork
- Jeff Teader – artwork

== Charts ==
Chart performance for You Cross My Path
Chart (2008)	Peak position
Irish Albums (IRMA)	96
Scottish Albums (Official Charts)	25
UK Albums (Official Charts)	39

== See also ==
- Ghosts I–IV – the 2008 album by Nine Inch Nails, similarly released for free
- Post Electric Blues – the 2009 album by Idlewild, which was initially self-released and later released through Cooking Vinyl
- Bandcamp – a service that allows artists to sell music for free
