= Simpatico (The Charlatans album) =

Studio album by the Charlatans
- Released: 17 April 2006
- Recorded: Mid-to-late 2005
- Studios: Hook End Manor, Oxfordshire; Townhouse, London
- Genres: Dub reggae; rock
- Length: 44:35
- Labels: Creole; Sanctuary
- Producers: Jim Lowe; The Charlatans

The Charlatans chronology
Up at the Lake (2004)	Simpatico (2006)	Forever: The Singles (2006)

Singles from Simpatico
- 1. "Blackened Blue Eyes" Released: 3 April 2006; 2. "NYC (There's No Need to Stop)" Released: 3 July 2006

Simpatico is the ninth studio album by British rock band the Charlatans, released on 17 April 2006 through Creole and Sanctuary Records. After signing to the latter label in early 2005, frontman Tim Burgess and guitarist Mark Collins went to Palm Springs, California, to write new material. With Jim Lowe and the band producing, recording was held at Hook End Manor in Oxfordshire, with overdubs later being done at Townhouse Studios in London. Simpatico is a dub reggae and rock album that draws comparisons to the work of the Dead 60s, Hard-Fi, and UB40. Bassist Martin Blunt and Burgess attributed the sound shift to them listening to Ken Boothe, Gregory Isaacs, and Studio One.

Simpatico received mixed reviews from music critics, who were split on the overall songwriting, while others lambasted the reggae direction. It peaked at number 5 in Scotland, number 10 in the United Kingdom, and number 83 in Ireland. "Blackened Blue Eyes" reached the top 30 in Scotland and the UK, while "NYC (There's No Need to Stop)" charted outside the top 50 in the UK. Before the album was released, the Charlatans performed at the South by Southwest music conference in Austin, Texas, and "Blackened Blue Eyes" was released as its lead single in April 2006. Burgess, who had become accustomed to alcohol and drugs, went through a detox programme before promotion commenced in earnest. They toured across the United States until June 2006; "NYC (There's No Need to Stop)" was released as the album's second single the following month.

== Background and recording ==
The Charlatans released their eighth studio album, Up at the Lake, in May 2004. It peaked at number 13 on the UK Albums Chart, while two of its singles – "Up at the Lake" and "Try Again Today" – charted within the top 30 of the UK Singles Chart. They promoted it with two tours of the UK. On 4 January 2005, new song, "Alles Klar", was posted on the band's website. Two days later, it was announced that the band had signed to Sanctuary Records. Bassist Martin Blunt said the band consumed various artists while on their touring bus while promoting Up at the Lake. He mentioned that Sanctuary had a "whole plethora of old dub and reggae stuff", which would be on the members' minds when going into their next album. In April 2005, when promoting the United States release of his solo album I Believe (2003), vocalist Tim Burgess said he was in the process of working on material for the band's next studio album. Burgess and guitarist Mark Collins spent some time in Palm Springs, California, writing and planning things out. The latter wrote a demo of "City of the Dead" and used this as a blueprint.

According to Burgess, the band was offered the choice of recording in a "really posh" studio for five weeks. It would have cost them the same amount of money if they had recorded in their studio, Big Mushroom, for a year; they ultimately agreed to it. Recording sessions were held at Hook End Manor in Oxfordshire in July 2005, with the idea of tracking 14 songs. Jim Lowe, known for his work with Stereophonics, and the band produced the proceedings; they were assisted by Tariq Mattar. Before work began, Burgess had become accustomed to alcohol and drugs; when at the studio, he said he "couldn't sing any more". Additionally, he wanted Adrian Sherwood as the producer, but Burgess "couldn't fight the battle because [he] was incapacitated." Collins said it reached a point where the members would tell Burgess to come back the following day. Though Rogers said sessions lasted two weeks, the proceedings continued into August 2005. By November 2005, three weeks had been spent mixing the recordings with Lowe at Townhouse Studios in London with assistance from Dan Porter. Burgess said they would also do overdubbing here; during this time, they heard rumours that Sanctuary Records, who owned Townhouse, would be shuttering. Tim Debney then mastered the album at the same studio.

== Composition and lyrics ==
Musically, Simpatico is a dub reggae and rock album that places emphasis on its grooves, replicating disco and reggae rhythms, earning a comparison to Emotional Rescue (1980) by the Rolling Stones, as well as to the work of the Dead 60s, Hard-Fi, and UB40. Blunt said they were listening to Studio One and LCD Soundsystem, while Burgess mentioned Ken Boothe and Gregory Isaacs. When an interviewer asked about a comparison with the Clash, Blunt attributed it to Burgess' love of the band. AllMusic reviewer Stephen Thomas Erlewine found that the "relaxed, natural rhythmic interplay" throughout the album makes it work as a "party record, or stylish background music." Cokemachineglow writer David M. Goldstein said that its "dub-influenced riddims aren't such a significant departure from the baggy dance-pop that the Charlies originally made their name on". Discussing the album's title, Simpatico, Blunt said that partway through recording, Burgess wrote the word on their planning board. Blunt looked up the word to discover it has its origins in Italian and Spanish, roughly translating to "with the same interests". Burgess said he came across the word while reading a book in which Keith Richards describes the relationship of his band, the Rolling Stones, with their producer, Jimmy Miller.

Burgess said he rewrote the words to the opening track, "Blackened Blue Eyes", shortly after it was picked to be released as a single, as he thought the original lyrics were not as good as he hoped they could be. He went on to say it had a "dark theme and was largely influenced by a couple of my friends" who were living in Los Angeles, California. Goldstein said it started with a "sinister piano riff exploding into seedy wah-wah guitar stabs and a driving back beat". The track evolved out of separate piano and bass parts that Rogers and Blunt, respectively, had written; the former came up with the title phrase, which Burgess wrote his lyrics around. It is an outlier to the album's reggae sound, coming closer to the groove-enhanced nature of their seventh studio album, Wonderland (2001). The art punk track "NYC (There's No Need to Stop)" recalled LCD Soundsystem and "Undercover of the Night" (1983) by the Rolling Stones, though Burgess said it hinted towards "This Is Radio Clash" (1981) by the Clash. Burgess and Collins wrote this with Kenn Richards, whom Burgess dubbed "New York Kenn", in a hotel room that they did not wish to leave. As Richards laughed at every word that Burgess said, he took this as encouragement to keep going with it.

"For Your Entertainment" is a ska-influenced track that was written in Palm Springs. Discussing the song, Burgess said he felt as if he was "there for someone else's entertainment"; he explained that his drug use had increased his sense of self-pity, making him think that. "Dead Man's Eye" is a Cajun death rock song; the title was adapted from the phrase "there'll always be a clue in a dead man's eye" that Burgess read in a lift. "Muddy Ground" is a mid-tempo track that was reminiscent of "Waiting on a Friend" (1981) by the Rolling Stones, which was musically written by Blunt and Rogers, while Burgess worked on the lyrics with Rogers. "City of the Dead" is a dancehall reggae track done in the vein of the Specials. Burgess wrote on a hill in his neighbourhood, which gave him "one of the best views" of Los Angeles. "Road to Paradise" was initially titled "Crackhouse" and was written by Blunt and Rogers, who wanted a "film noir feel." Burgess remarked that it was "about Paradise and its definition.. and the path(s) we take to get there and the decisions that we make." "When the Lights Go Out in London", which was originally named "The World Is a Hound", evokes the band's older style and recounts the July 2005 bombings in London.

The title of "The Architect" is a reference to the film series The Matrix, though Burgess said the titular architect was his friend Dean Fragile, who "really helped me through some dark times before during and after the making of this album". He added that many of the lyrics in it were aimed at an associate of the band and were taken from a recording of him, Fragile and former Libertines member Carl Barât. Goldstein said it had a haunting theremin part, "icy electric piano, and a lithe bassline containing more pop than those which precede it, but its still more Matisyahu than Lee Perry." Discussing "Glory Glory", Burgess said Collins went to Palm Springs, and from there, the pair went to Joshua Tree, California, where they had a "Gram Parsons trip". The album concludes with "Sunset & Vine", an instrumental, synthesiser-centred track in the vein of Giorgio Moroder. Burgess took its title from a signpost that he saw.

== Release ==
Shortly before the Charlatans had presented the final version of the album to Sanctuary Records, A&R representative John Williams, who had signed the band to the label, quit his role. Burgess said Williams' "parting gift" was the resuscitation of defunct reggae label Creole Records solely for them. On 12 January 2006, Simpatico was announced for release in three months' time. By the end of the month, the album's track listing was posted online; demos of "Dead Man's Eye" and "Road to Paradise", as well as videos from the sessions, were made available on the band's website. In March 2006, the band appeared at the South by Southwest music conference in Austin, Texas, where they met former Creation Records owner Alan McGee. "Blackened Blue Eyes" was released as the album's lead single on 3 April 2006. Two versions were released on CD: the first with "Arise Arise", while the second featured "Cry Cry Cry" and "Don't You Worry" as its B-sides, alongside the music video for "Blackened Blue Eyes". The video was filmed by Charles Mehling, whom Burgess had previously met when he was the bassist in the Brian Jonestown Massacre. It was released to American modern rock radio stations the following day.

That same month, Burgess decided to give up drinking and doing drugs; he booked a hotel room where he entered into a self-imposed detox period. He lasted nine days before touring for the album commenced. Touring manager Curly Jobson and press officer Tony Linkin became increasingly worried about Burgess' state. Sometime later, at the suggestion of Jobson, Burgess visited doctor Nish Joshi in London, who put him through a 21-day detox programme. Subsequent shows after the conclusion of the 21 days had a noticeable improvement in Burgess' performances. Simpatico was released in the UK on 17 April 2006 through Creole and Sanctuary Records. The album was released in Mexico on 1 May 2006 through the label Noiselab, which had increased activity after a meeting between its owner Hector Mijangos and McGee. The US edition came out a day later, under the band's moniker, Charlatans UK, through Sanctuary and Creole Records. On the same day, it was reported that the band left their long-serving manager Steve Harrison in favour of Stephen King and McGee, both of Creation Management.

Burgess explained that since 1999, he had been trying unsuccessfully to get the band a new manager for the US, prompting Jobson to fill that role temporarily. Harrison resigned following a disparaging email from Burgess, which his wife helped write. The band embarked on a tour of the US through June 2006. A remix of "NYC (There's No Need to Stop)" was posted on the band's website at the end of the month as part of an online fan club. "NYC (There's No Need to Stop)" was released as the second single from the album on 3 July 2006. Two versions were released on CD: the first with "Carry Your Heart", while the second included "Hard to Be You (Song for Carl)" and "Bullet of Freedom" as its B-sides, alongside the music video for "NYC (There's No Need to Stop)". Through August 2006, the band appeared at the Oxegen, T in the Park, and V Festivals. Following this, they supported the Rolling Stones at Twickenham Stadium in London and Hampden Park in Glasgow. In October 2006, Burgess and McGee went on a DJ tour, dubbed the Diet Coke and Banana Tour, intended as a bonding event between artist and manager that would help them map out the band's future plans.

"Blackened Blue Eyes" was featured on the band's third and fifth compilation albums, Forever: The Singles (2006) and A Head Full of Ideas (2021).

== Reception ==
Professional ratings
Aggregate scores
Source	Rating
Metacritic	55/100
Review scores
Source	Rating
AllMusic	3/5 stars
Cokemachineglow	67%
The Guardian	2/5 stars
musicOMH	2/5 stars
Now	3/5 Ns
The Observer	2/5 stars
Pitchfork	5.4/10
PopMatters	3/10
Uncut	3/5 stars
Yahoo! Launch	5/10 stars

Simpatico was met with "mixed or average" reviews from critics. At Metacritic, which assigns a weighted average rating out of 100 to reviews from mainstream publications, this release received an average score of 55 based on 19 reviews.

Critics were mixed about the overall songwriting. Elizabeth Bromstein of Now called it a "groovy record from start to finish," though with "no major standout fantastic song and nothing that sucks". Erlewine wrote that the band's "conscious decision to emphasize groove and group interaction [...] pays off to a certain extent at least", though upon "close listening, it's not as compelling [as other albums], which is all due to the emphasis of sound over song." Exclaim! writer Rob Bolton noted that while there were "plenty of classic Charlatans songs, [...] something just doesn't seem to click", mentioning that it was "unlikely [that] this will catch on with first-timers." Paul Mardles of The Observer felt that "[p]redictably, it's not among the quintet's finest hours", and while there were "glimpses of the highs of which they're capable, [...] Simpatico makes your cheeks turn red on the band's behalf." The Guardian's Leonie Cooper wrote that when the band stepped away from their usual sound, it was a "refreshing change, but not vital enough to prove that the group are worthy of any type of adulation." The Skinny writer Jon Seller said it came across as "something of a pipe-and-slippers foray" for the band, as it "pushes no boundaries, instead giving the impression of a band beyond taking risks." Roger Holland of PopMatters praised the opening track, but "[u]nfortunately, that's about it for Simpatico."

Reviewers were largely critical of the reggae direction. Goldstein said that the majority of the "attempts here at reggae suffer not because these guys are incapable of skank, but rather from a seeming lack of conviction", as too frequently it sounded as if the band was conveying the "bare minimum to get these songs across, when they really should be getting freaky." Pitchfork contributor Stuart Berman wrote that they "sound like they'd prefer to sit on their asses and listen to dub records all day." He added that "far too many tracks here opt for atmosphere over impact". musicOMH contributor John Murphy thought the musical style change was an "interesting move, but one that’s not wholly successful", as several of the tracks "feel stale and uninspired". Uncut reviewer Paul Moody said the album's mix of styles "will leave newer converts scratching their heads and fans of 1994's bleak third album, Up To Our Hips, reaching for the Rizla's." Dan Gennoe of Yahoo! Launch thought that the band "sound[ed] monumentally bored", with the "clues to their waning enthusiasm com[ing] as early as the opening track." He mentioned that the switch to reggae was a "leap too far" for the band, as Simpatico was the sound of a band "desperately scrabbling around for inspiration and sounding completely unconvinced with everything they try." BBC Music writer Chris Long went further, saying that it was an "experiment too far. A new direction was needed, but that direction should not have been a musical journey round the Caribbean."

Simpatico peaked at number 10 in the UK, selling 12,700 copies in its first week of release. It charted at number 5 in Scotland and number 83 in Ireland. "Blackened Blue Eyes" charted at number 10 in Scotland, number 28 in the UK, and number 40 in Ireland. "NYC (There's No Need to Stop)" charted at number 24 in Scotland and number 53 in the UK.

== Track listing ==
All songs written by Martin Blunt, Jon Brookes, Tim Burgess, Mark Collins, and Tony Rogers.

1. "Blackened Blue Eyes" – 4:19
2. "NYC (There's No Need to Stop)" – 3:32
3. "For Your Entertainment" – 3:58
4. "Dead Man's Eye" – 4:21
5. "Muddy Ground" – 4:00
6. "City of the Dead" – 4:02
7. "Road to Paradise" – 4:32
8. "When the Lights Go Out in London" – 4:20
9. "The Architect" – 4:10
10. "Glory Glory" – 3:31
11. "Sunset & Vine" – 3:45

== Personnel ==
Personnel per booklet.

The Charlatans

- Martin Blunt – bass guitar
- Jon Brookes – drums
- Tim Burgess – lead vocals, melodica, harmonica
- Mark Collins – guitars
- Tony Rogers – keyboards, backing vocals

Additional musicians

- Ged Lynch – percussion

Production and design

- Jim Lowe – producer, mixing
- The Charlatans – producer
- Tariq Mattar – assistant
- Dan Porter – assistant
- Tim Debney – mastering
- Roger Sargent – photography
- Mark James – design
- Sophie Thunder – illustrations
- Jenny Hardcore – architect photograph

== Charts ==
Chart performance for Simpatico
Chart (2006)	Peak position
Irish Albums (IRMA)	83
Scottish Albums (Official Charts)	5
UK Albums (Official Charts)	10
UK Independent Albums (Official Charts)	1
