= Us and Us Only =

Studio album by the Charlatans
- Released: 18 October 1999
- Recorded: March–April 1999
- Studios: Big Mushroom, Middlewich, Cheshire; Great Linford Manor, Buckinghamshire
- Genres: Country rock; folk; roots rock
- Length: 52:22
- Label: Universal
- Producer: The Charlatans

The Charlatans chronology
Melting Pot (1998)	Us and Us Only (1999)	Wonderland (2001)

Singles from Us and Us Only
- 1. "Forever" Released: 4 October 1999; 2. "My Beautiful Friend" Released: 6 December 1999; 3. "Impossible" Released: 15 May 2000

Us and Us Only is the sixth studio album by British rock band the Charlatans, released by Universal on 18 October 1999. After touring for their fifth studio album, Tellin' Stories, wrapped up by the end of 1997, they played minimal shows throughout 1998 and planned its follow-up. They built their own recording studio, aiming to start recording by early 1999; sessions eventually took place in March and April 1999 with the band self-producing. Us and Us Only is a country rock, folk, and roots rock album that strayed from the band's British roots in lieu of American-focused music.

"Forever" was released as Us and Us Only's lead single in October 1999, which was followed by a tour of the United Kingdom. "My Beautiful Friend" appeared as the second single from the album in December 1999; in early 2000, the Charlatans toured the United States with Stereophonics. The Charlatans toured the UK again throughout April 2000, leading to the release of the album's third single, "Impossible", in May 2000. A two-disc edition of the album was released in 2011 by Universal UMC and Island Records.

Us and Us Only received generally favourable reviews from music critics, many of whom praised the songwriting and musicianship. Retrospective reviews continued to praise these aspects, with some referring to it as the Charlatan's best work. It peaked at number two on the album charts in both Scotland and the UK. All three of the album's singles peaked within the top 30 in both Scotland and the UK, with "Forever" charting the highest at numbers 8 and 12, respectively. Melody Maker, NME, and Select included the album on their lists of the year's best releases.

== Background and development ==
The Charlatans released their fifth studio album, Tellin' Stories, through independent label Beggars Banquet Records in April 1997 in the United Kingdom and through major label MCA Records in the United States. Partway through the recording sessions, keyboardist Rob Collins was killed in a car crash. Nearing the end of the process, the Charlatans had signed a deal with MCA Records and its parent company Universal Music Group for £1 million, though they remained with Beggars Banquet for the UK. It hit number one in the UK Albums Chart; all four of its singles reached the top 20 in the UK Singles Chart, with "One to Another" peaking the highest at number three. They promoted the album with two UK tours, the first of which saw the introduction of keyboardist Tony Rogers, two US tours, and shows in Japan through to the end of the year.

Tellin' Stories appeared high on album of the year lists alongside OK Computer (1997) by Radiohead and Urban Hymns (1997) by the Verve. By 1998, the Charlatans were being cited as an influence on various newer acts, such as Jaguar, Mainstream, and Runston Parva. The Charlatans' contract with Beggars Banquet ended with Melting Pot, a singles collection that was released in February 1998, which they helped organise. Later in the year, they played a warm-up gig leading up to an appearance at V Festival. After this, they flew to Los Angeles, California, for a one-off show and a holiday break, where they planned to follow up on Tellin' Stories. By late 1998, they decided to build their own residential recording studio, which they hoped would help save on the costs of recording at other studios, such as Rockfield and Monnow Valley, both of which they had previously used.

== Recording ==
As construction was underway, Burgess returned to Los Angeles to spend time with his girlfriend Michelle for seven weeks across the end of the year and the start of 1999. Upon returning to the UK, he found that their studio was still being built; they had planned to start recording later in the month. He spent time listening to various Chess Records that MCA had sent the band, by the likes of Chuck Berry, John Lee Hooker, and Howlin' Wolf. While this was going on, bassist Martin Blunt's marriage was ending, guitarist Mark Collins was enjoying time with his family, and keyboardist Tony Rogers was spending time with Blunt and drummer Jon Brookes. Burgess toyed with the idea of moving to London with Michelle but realised it would not be worth the effort as he would be on tour often and she had friends in Los Angeles.

NME reported that construction on the studio had been completed by March 1999 and that recording was underway for an album that was expected by late 1999. On the same day the band christened their studio Big Mushroom, they learned that their accountant, Trevor Williams, had stolen £300,000 from their funds, which should have been used for taxes dating back five years. Williams appeared before the magistrates in March 1999, with the band's manager Steve Harrision in attendance while the band was busy with the studio. Sessions were held at Big Mushroom in Middlewich, Cheshire, and at Great Linford Manor in Buckinghamshire, with the band self-producing and James Spencer recording the proceedings.

Spencer had recently finished working on Twisted Tenderness (1999) by Electronic. Throughout the process, Burgess and Spencer would spend time working on either the lyrics, melodies, or vocals separately; Burgess would often write lyrics on Sundays, when he would feel less pressured. By late April 1999, the recording had almost wrapped up. Tom Rothrock and Rob Schnapf were initially brought in to do some mixes, but the pair had wanted to do it at Abbey Road Studios in London. The band and Spencer ultimately mixed the album at Electric Lady Studios in New York City until June 1999. It was mastered at Sterling Sound, also in New York City, by engineer Greg Clabi, who was accompanied by Spencer; Blunt said it was mastered in that city as "American records sound louder".

== Composition and lyrics ==
=== Overview ===
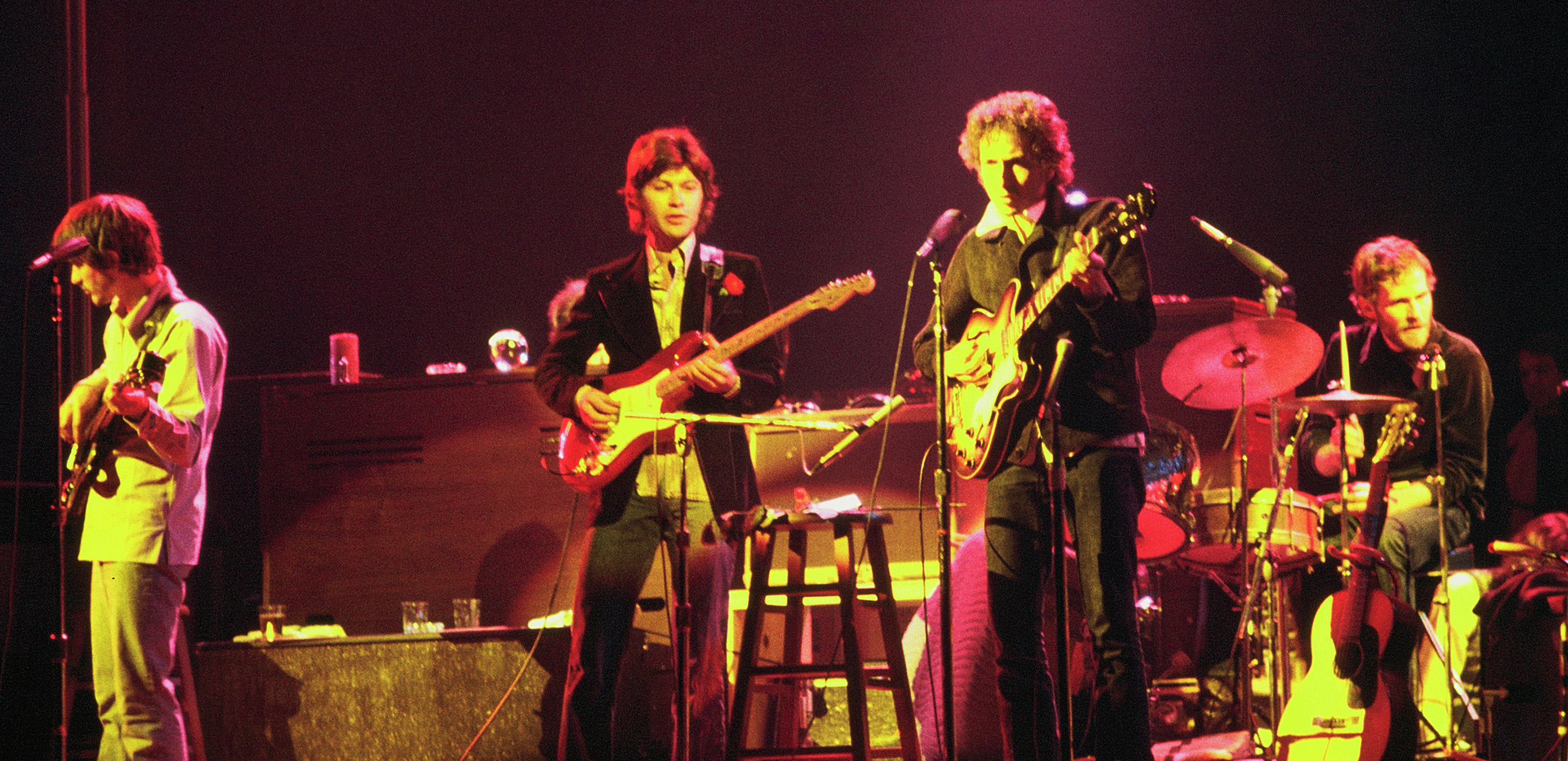
Journalist Gary Graff said the Charlatans had ditched their British roots in favour of American-focused music, such as the works of Bob Dylan and the Band (pictured in 1974).

Musically, the sound of Us and Us Only has been described as country rock, folk, and roots rock; PopMatters music editor Sarah Zupko pondered if "they've been listening to Gomez or Beta Band". It lacked the dance beats found in their earlier work. In a review for Wall of Sound, journalist Gary Graff wrote that the Charlatans had largely abandoned their British roots in favour of American-centric music, such as the works of Bob Dylan and the Band, namely the latter's Music from Big Pink (1968). AllMusic reviewer Stephen Thomas Erlewine said in contrast to the "stripped-down, straight-ahead collection" of Tellin' Stories, Us and Us Only "dresses up the band's continually impressive songcraft in a moody atmosphere, borrowed in equal parts" from the work of the Chemical Brothers, as well as Blonde on Blonde (1966) by Dylan and Beggars Banquet (1968) by the Rolling Stones. He added that there was a "haze of keyboards and subdued beats, and this murky veil never really lifts" throughout the album. Burgess said they drew inspiration from music between the 1950s and 1970s.

Matt Hendrickson of Rolling Stone referred to it as if Exile on Main St. (1972) by the Rolling Stones was "remixed by the Chemical Brothers". Burgess said the album's title, which is taken from a line in "Forever", was indicative of their "post-Rob [Collins] set-up; nine months in our own studio with no one else around". Dave Kendall of MTV theorised that the title referred to the band's "status as sole survivors of the original Madchester mob they were lumped in with". Steve Taylor, in his book The A to X of Alternative Music (2006), said it was full of "personal songs that are shot through with a sense of resolve in the face of adversity and tragedy, with angels and witches [as] a recurring motif".

=== Tracks ===
The album opens with "Forever", a seven-and-a-half-minute-long track with bass that evokes the sound of Massive Attack. Blunt came up with a rudimentary version of "Forever" after hanging out with Brookes and Rogers, which was then presented to Burgess. Burgess came up with the lyrics while in a hotel in Tokyo, Japan, admiring the view from his window, which he then sang to Blunt and Rogers. Burgess wanted a song with a "big title" and thought "there was nothing bigger than 'forever'", which he had lifted from Wu-Tang Clan. He said the song was influenced by "Tomorrow Never Knows" (1966) and "Strawberry Fields Forever" (1967), both by the Beatles. Brookes and Spencer wrote the middle eight section; the former wanted to make a drum loop akin to the work of Beastie Boys.

"Forever" is followed by the instrumental "Good Witch, Bad Witch 1", which lasts for 51 seconds; Kendall considered it a "trailer for the actual song" towards the album's end. Both parts recall "Venus as a Boy" (1993) by Björk. Kendall said "Impossible" set the standard for the remainder of the album of "impeccably arranged '60s pop songs rich in pedigree and bankrupt in R&D." The track talks about a disintegrating relationship as well as the topic of jealousy, while its name was taken from Wu-Tang Clan. Burgess made an early version of the song with his eight-track recorder; he played it for the Chemical Brothers, who proceeded to alter the instrumentation, bringing it closer to what would eventually appear on the album. "The Blonde Waltz" is about Blunt being a single parent with his two children and was influenced by the work of Woody Guthrie, whom Burgess had gotten into in 1998.

The guitarwork in "A House Is Not a Home" was reminiscent of that by the Rolling Stones, with one riff being lifted from "I Don't Believe You (She Acts Like We Never Have Met)" (1974) by Dylan. The melancholic and harmonica-centred "Senses (Angel on My Shoulder)" was compared to the work of Nick Cave, which Burgess said dealt with people he knew and had admiration for. Blunt considered it a mix between the sound of the Spencer Davis Group and Traffic. The beat in "My Beautiful Friend" was influenced by "My Lovin' Is Digi" (1998) by RZA; Burgess said it talked about "saying goodbye to something and welcoming something new", highlighting Collins' death, the arrival of Rogers, and moving to the US. Blunt and Rogers came up with the beat at Brookes' flat in Wednesbury, where all of his drums were located.

"I Don't Care Where You Live" features Byrds-esque vocal harmonies. Burgess wrote the lyrics while in Los Angeles, which he said were inspired by performances by the Brian Jonestown Massacre and Elliott Smith. "The Blind Stagger" consists of wind instruments, only interrupted by a guitar solo; when recording the songs, they synched up four bass drums to achieve a particular tone. For "Good Witch, Bad Witch 2", Blunt wanted his bass parts to evoke the tones he heard on Enter the Wu-Tang (36 Chambers) (1993) by Wu-Tang Clan. With "Watching You", which evolved out of a jam session, Burgess said they wanted a cross between the Beach Boys and the Rolling Stones. The hidden track "Tony's Bar & Grill" came from a jam between Blunt and Rogers; Spencer said Brookes was "going to do some human beatboxing, but just burst into hysterics!"

== Release ==
In the middle of recording, the Charlatans played a one-off show in Japan. On 15 June 1999, Us and Us Only was announced for release in four months' time. In August 1999, following a warm-up show in Liverpool, the band headlined the Reading and Leeds Festivals. They were due to play a one-off show at the Glasgow Green the following month, with support from Beth Orton and Cast, but the event was cancelled when they were unable to acquire a licence for it. "Forever" was released as the lead single from the album on 4 October 1999. Burgess said that up to that point they had "five singles [played] on Radio 1 and we thought we'd try and sneak in a seven-minute one!". Two editions were released on CD: the first had an edit of "Forever" with "A Great Place to Leave" and "When Your Ship Comes In" as its B-sides, while the other features the edit and full-length album versions of "Forever" with "Sleepy Little Sunshine Boy", in addition to the music video for "Forever" (directed by Kevin Godley). They performed on "Forever" for a Mark Radcliffe session for BBC Radio 1.

Us and Us Only was released on 18 October 1999 through Universal, while MCA released it in the US the following day. In the US, MCA and promoter The Syndicate wanted to use the band's historical background as a base for the album's potential success across the country. The Charlatans promoted it with an in-store performance at the flagship HMV branch in London, which had been broadcast online as a webcast. This coincided with the launch of HMV's online store. Conrad Mewton, in his book All You Need to Know About Music & the Internet Revolution (2010), said the webcast was a "pivotal moment, the traditional album launch working hand in hand with a burgeoning new technology to take music promotion to a new level". Following this, they embarked on a tour of the UK that ran into November 1999.

After originally being scheduled for 29 November 1999, "My Beautiful Friend" was eventually released as the album's second single on 6 December 1999. Two editions were released on CD: the first had an edit of "My Beautiful Friend" with "Scorched" and "Your Precious Love" as its B-sides, while the other included the edit and remixes of "My Beautiful Friend" done by Lionrock and Jagz Kooner, as well as the music video for "My Beautiful Friend". Sometime after this, Burgess moved to Los Angeles and got married. In March and April 2000, the band went on a two-week tour of North America with Stereophonics; a week prior to the beginning of the trek, the Charlatans had filmed a music video for "Impossible". Though Burgess suffered from the flu, which he thought he caught while in the UK, he continued on with the tour. Following this, the Charlatans embarked on a UK tour dubbed Chewing Gum Weekend Tour; it ended with a gig in Ireland with support from Gomez and JJ72. "Impossible" was released as the third single from the album on 15 May 2000. Two editions were released on CD: the first had an edit and remix of "Impossible" with "Don't Go Giving It Up" as its B-side, while the other featured the edit and full album versions of "Impossible" with "You Got It, I Want It", in addition to the music video for "Impossible".

In 2011, Universal UMC and Island Records released a two-disc edition of the album, which included B-sides, radio sessions, and remixes. Mark Collins said this was the label's doing, and "as a band we like the album so had no problem with the choice"; he would have preferred their next studio album, Wonderland (2001), to receive the expanded treatment first. The standard version of the album was re-pressed on vinyl for the 2019 Record Store Day event. "Forever", "My Beautiful Friend", and "Impossible" were featured on the band's third compilation album, Forever: The Singles (2006). "Forever", "I Don't Care Where You Live", and "The Blonde Waltz" were included on their fourth compilation album Collection (2007). Edits of "Forever" and "Impossible" were featured on their fifth compilation album, A Head Full of Ideas (2021).

== Critical reception ==
Professional ratings
Review scores
Source	Rating
AllMusic	3.5/5 stars
Alternative Press	4/5
The Guardian	4/5 stars
NME	8/10
Pitchfork	6.9/10
PopMatters	7.6/10
Q	4/5 stars
Rolling Stone	3.5/5 stars
Select	4/5
Wall of Sound	77/100
The Rolling Stone Album Guide	3/5 stars

Us and Us Only was met with generally favourable reviews from music critics. Erlewine felt that it was "merely a step below their previous high point of Tellin' Stories", complimenting that each of the tracks "works its charms with subtle grace and considerable muscle". NME writer Sylvia Patterson found it to be the "sound of a band completing their long-promised mission to obliterate, forever, their indie status by entering the widescreen wonderland of eternal Rock'n'Roll Class". Graff said that in addition to the exploration of American music styles on the album, the band had "flavor[ed] it with enough British pop sensibility to make it more than simply sifting through the past". Exclaim!'s Rob Bolton said it was "great stuff" and praised the band for "keeping their head screwed on well enough to keep their music in focus."

Hendrickson said that while it was not as "instantly catchy" as their prior releases, it was the "slow-burning work of five men who have injected new life into their sound", cementing the group as "one of the most consistent English bands of the last ten years". Consumable Online writer Chris Hill and CMJ New Music Monthly's Jonathan Perry expressed a similar sentiment, with the latter saying that after the previous "string of mediocre efforts", Us and Us Only "sounds remarkably vital". Kendall called the band "quintessential pop craftsmen," as the tracks they offered were "flawless: effortlessly effective key changes and chord progressions". CMJ New Music Report writer Bill Konig referred to it as "perhaps the group's finest effort to date". Zupko shared this thought and added to it by noting that the band "broadened their sound way beyond baggy and well beyond the Britpop of Tellin' Stories".

Reviewing the 2011 edition, Jake Kennedy of Record Collector said the only difference between Tellin' Stories and Us and Us Only "perhaps was age – or rather maturity. By Us And Us Only, this band had, tragically, acquired it in spades." Dead Press! writer Rhys Milsom added to this, saying the tracks were "some of the most musically and lyrically enduring the band have written." Drowned in Sound's Dom Gourlay wrote that "few could argue that Us And Us Only represents possibly the last record created by The Charlatans that could boast a fluent level of consistency from start to finish". BBC Music reviewer Ian Wade echoed a similar statement, saying it was "probably the last great, brilliant and fully consistent Charlatans album. It's the sound of a band at ease in their own skins, and was a summation of everything they'd become in their first decade".

== Commercial performance and aftermath ==
Us and Us Only peaked at number two in both Scotland and the UK, being kept off the top spot by Come On Over (1997) by Shania Twain. It was certified gold in the UK by the British Phonographic Industry 11 days after its release. "Forever" charted at number eight in Scotland and number 12 in the UK. "My Beautiful Friend" charted at number 24 in Scotland and number 31 in the UK. "Impossible" charted at number ten in Scotland and number 15 in the UK.

Author Richard Luck, in his book The Madchester Scene (2002), said that after Tellin' Stories, he thought that the follow-up would not be as successful, "and, sure enough, Us & Us Only failed to set the pop world on fire". In 2011, Collins said Us and Us Only and Wonderland "have a certain magic about them as well. For Us and Us Only I think it was a really positive [experience] for us". The following year, Burgess felt it stood up "well, but it was never meant to be commercial", adding that it helped move the band away from their Britpop contemporaries. Though he was satisfied with the promotion that Universal had provided, he went on to compare the album to John Wesley Harding (1967) by Dylan: "detached and a step sideways. Perhaps difficult to promote."

== Track listing ==
All songs by Martin Blunt, Jon Brookes, Tim Burgess, Mark Collins, and Tony Rogers. The European and US releases swap "Good Witch, Bad Witch 1" for "Good Witch, Bad Witch 3" and remove "Good Witch, Bad Witch 2".

1. "Forever" – 7:25
2. "Good Witch, Bad Witch 1" – 0:51
3. "Impossible" – 5:04
4. "The Blonde Waltz" – 4:31
5. "A House Is Not a Home" – 4:50
6. "Senses (Angel on My Shoulder)" – 4:45
7. "My Beautiful Friend" – 4:32
8. "I Don't Care Where You Live" – 2:55
9. "The Blind Stagger" – 4:56
10. "Good Witch, Bad Witch 2" – 3:23
11. "Watching You" (includes hidden track "Tony's Bar & Grill") – 8:48

== Personnel ==
Personnel per booklet.

The Charlatans

- Martin Blunt – bass
- Jon Brookes – drums
- Tim Burgess – lead vocals, harmonica
- Mark Collins – guitars
- Tony Rogers – Mellotron, organ, piano, backing vocals

Production and design

- The Charlatans – producer
- James Spencer – recording, mixing
- Tom Sheehan – photography, art direction
- Ben Young – design

== Charts and certifications ==
=== Weekly charts ===
Chart performance for Us and Us Only
Chart (1999)	Peak position
Scottish Albums (Official Charts)	2
UK Albums (Official Charts)	2

=== Certifications ===
Certifications for Us and Us Only
Region	Certification	Certified units/sales
United Kingdom (BPI)	Gold	100,000^{^}
^{^} Shipments figures based on certification alone.
