= Up at the Lake =

Studio album by the Charlatans
- Released: 17 May 2004
- Recorded: March 2003 – February 2004
- Studios: Big Mushroom, Cheshire
- Genres: Pop rock; country rock
- Length: 45:05
- Labels: Universal; Island
- Producers: The Charlatans; James Spencer

The Charlatans chronology
Wonderland (2001)	Up at the Lake (2004)	Simpatico (2006)

Singles from Up at the Lake
- 1. "Up at the Lake" Released: 10 May 2004; 2. "Try Again Today" Released: 26 July 2004; 3. "Loving You Is Easy" Released: 20 December 2004

Up at the Lake is the eighth studio album by the British alternative rock band The Charlatans, released on 17 May 2004 through Universal and Island Records Group. As promotion wrapped up for their seventh album, Wonderland (2001), Universal wanted them to follow it up with another one quickly. However, frontman Tim Burgess began working on his debut solo album in late 2002. At the end of the year, the band reconvened to write songs; by March 2003, they relocated to their own studio, Big Mushroom, in Cheshire, Greater Manchester, with them and James Spencer serving as producers. Recording halted in May 2003 to allow for Burgess to finish his album, I Believe (2003); sessions would resume by the end of the year and finish in February 2004. Up at the Lake is a pop rock album that pursues the country rock direction that they had first explored on their sixth album, Tellin' Stories (1997).

Up at the Lake received generally favourable reviews from music critics, many of whom praised the songwriting. It peaked at number 6 in Scotland, number 13 in the United Kingdom, and number 32 in Ireland, being certified silver in the UK 11 days after its release. Both "Up at the Lake" and "Try Again Today" reached the top 30 on the Scottish and UK Singles Charts. "Up at the Lake" was released as the album's lead single in May 2004, which was promoted with a tour of the UK and appearances at the Isle of Wight and T in the Park festivals until the following month. "Try Again Today" was released as the second single from the album in July 2004; afterwards, the Charlatans performed at the V Festival. In December 2004, the band embarked on another tour of the UK, and "Loving You Is Easy" was released as a radio-only promotional single. A video album from that tour was released in early 2005 under the title Live at Last Brixton Academy.

== Background and development ==
The Charlatans released their seventh studio album, Wonderland, in September 2001 through Universal Records. As it was released in the United States on 11 September, it would perform poorly commercially in that territory. In the United Kingdom, it peaked at number two in the UK Albums Chart, while its two singles, "Love Is the Key" and "A Man Needs to Be Told", charted within the top 40 of the UK Singles Chart. They promoted it with two tours in the UK and one in the US, along with appearances at the Coachella, Isle of Wight, and Glastonbury Festivals. After supporting Stereophonics at Slane Castle in Dublin, Ireland, in August 2002, the Charlatans played three club shows to end the month. Universal wanted a follow-up quickly, threatening the band with dropping them from the roster if they did not work on one; frontman Tim Burgess was not happy with the situation. He wanted to continue writing, but the rest of the band members wanted a break.

In October 2002, Dotmusic reported that Burgess was recording a solo album with Linus of Hollywood. A few days later, the band denied rumours that they would be splitting up but mentioned that the other members worked with different artists: drummer Jon Brookes with Preacher Man and keyboardist Tony Rogers with Moco. In the same announcement, they mentioned that they would start demoing material for their next album in early 2003, which they were aiming to release later that year. In December 2002, the band started writing new songs; guitarist Mark Collins subsequently visited Burgess in February 2003 at his home in Los Angeles, California, where the pair worked for three weeks, finishing four tracks in the process. The two of them would then spend some time in a cottage in Bodmin Moor, Cornwall. As the pair left behind a CD of the material they were working on, the material made it out to the public as a bootleg.

== Recording ==
In March 2003, the band relocated to their own studio, Big Mushroom, in Cheshire, Greater Manchester, with them and engineer James Spencer serving as producers. Burgess said that unlike Wonderland, they had no firm idea of what musical direction they wanted to take for Up at the Lake when they got into the studio. By May 2003, they had finished seven songs but had to pause recording as Burgess shifted focus to his solo debut, I Believe (2003). Bassist Martin Blunt said the plan was for Burgess to finish promoting his album before they would return to work on their album. While this was occurring, the band held a warm-up show in London prior to their appearances at the Move and T in the Park festivals in July 2003. At the former festival, the band premiered a new track, "Feel the Pressure".

Collins, meanwhile, worked with Adam Masterson, marking his first producer role outside of the band; Rogers performed on one of his tracks. The band regrouped at Big Mushroom in December 2003, after the conclusion of Burgess' solo tour of the UK. They expected to have an album's worth of tracks finished by early 2004, eventually ending in February 2004. Linus of Hollywood recorded Burgess' vocals for "Try Again Today"; Mike Cave did additional engineering on it, as Blunt thought the song sounded a bit overproduced. The songs were mixed by Spencer, Ken Nelson, and the Chemical Brothers at Parr Street Studios in Liverpool and Mayfair and Miloco Studios in London, before the album was mastered by Frank Arkwright at Townhouse Studios, also in London. Johnny Marr helped compile the final track listing.

== Composition and lyrics ==
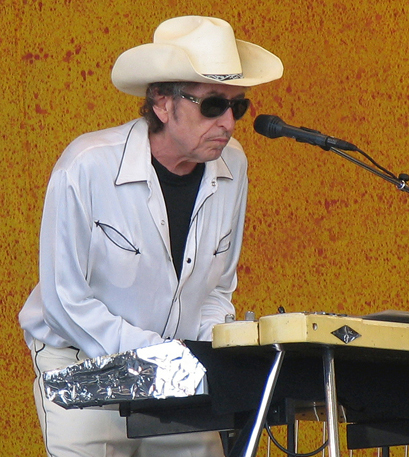
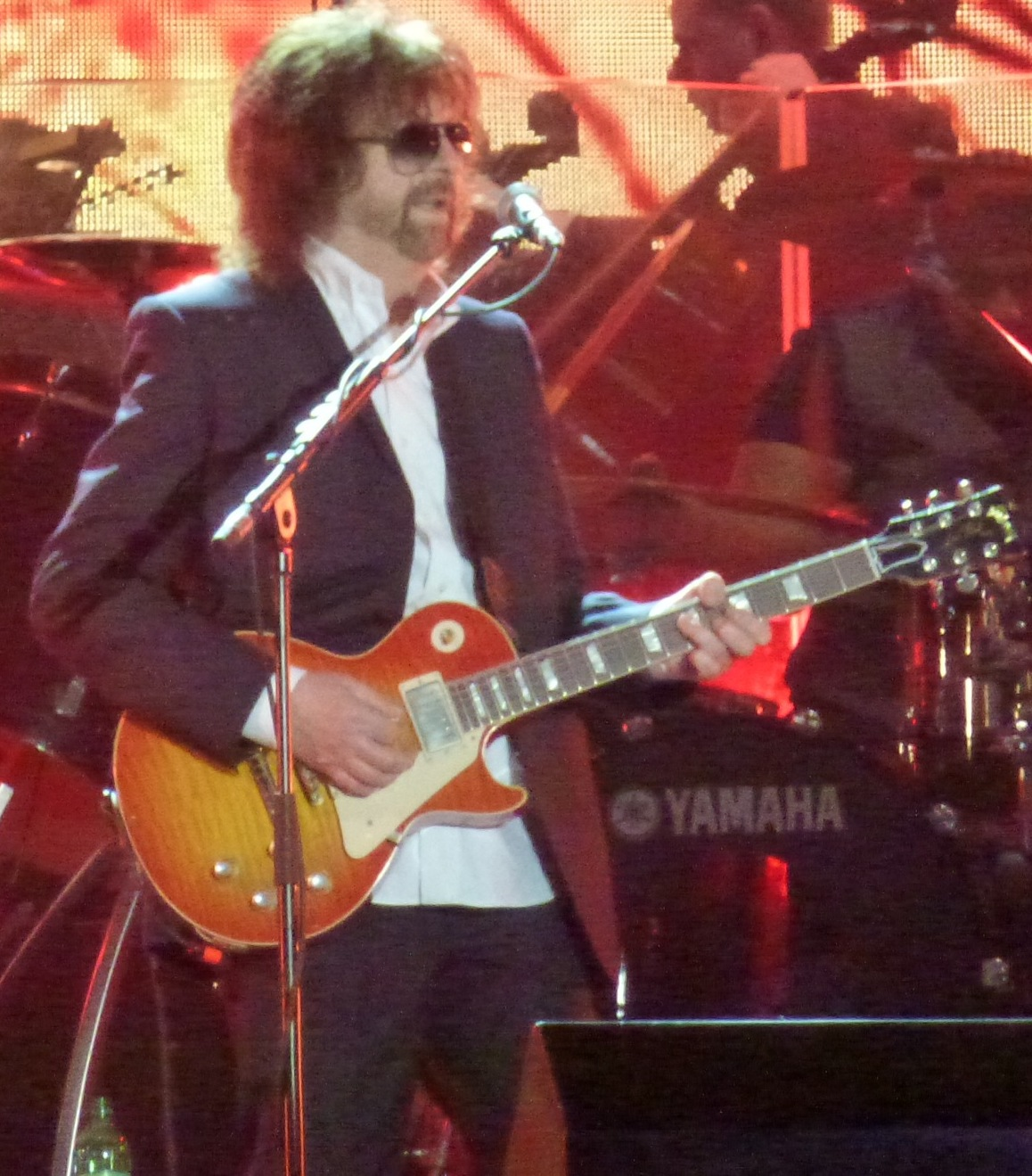
Comparisons were made from individual songs on Up at the Lake to the works of Bob Dylan (left; pictured in 2006) and Electric Light Orchestra (right; pictured in 2014).

Musically, Up at the Lake is a pop rock album that continues the country rock direction that the band initially explored on their sixth album, Tellin' Stories (1997). Cokemachineglow writer David M. Goldstein explained that Up at the Lake had the "same hazy, guitar-centered production, and an emphasis on la-di-da country-rockers evoking the [Rolling] Stones at their late '60s/early '70s peak" as Tellin' Stories. AllMusic reviewer Jason Damas wrote that the "classic-rock coloring that dominated discs" such as the band's self-titled (1995) and Tellin' Stories albums return, in addition to "brief flirtations with classic folk". The band's trademark Hammond organ sound also returned, though in a reduced presence, as Collins' guitarwork was placed higher in the mix. Burgess largely dropped the falsetto vocal styling that he used on the majority of Wonderland, though it was used on "Up at the Lake". According to Burgess, the album's title is taken from a never-made David Lynch film, and "I thought we could at least provide the soundtrack to this unmade film".

The opening track, "Up at the Lake", is a British traditional rock song; its first line is adapted from "Loose Fit" (1990) by former contemporaries Happy Mondays. The indie disco song "Feel the Pressure" evokes the Tellin' Stories track "One to Another". Burgess said its "full horror movie" intro section was made by the collaborators, the Chemical Brothers. For the rest of the track, Collins came up with music that was more akin to the rest of the album until Blunt said the Chemical Brothers "did their thing to it." Burgess had Brookes play a drum pattern akin to the sound of Adam and the Ants and Bow Wow Wow. The opening portion of the following track, "As I Watch You in Disbelief", is taken from "'Heroes'" (1977) by David Bowie. Burgess said it detailed "being broken" and was influenced by "When I Paint My Masterpiece" (1971) by Bob Dylan. "Cry Yourself to Sleep" retreads the American country and folk direction that Burgess tackled on I Believe. It was written by Rogers, though Burgess said he potentially contributed a few lyrics to it. Rogers described it as a melancholic song about his daughters moving to Australia. Ged Lynch, formerly of Black Grape, contributed percussion to the track.

"Bona Fide Treasure" is done in the style of Electric Light Orchestra, while "High Up Your Tree" was compared to Ween, specifically on their album White Pepper (2000). Discussing the latter, Burgess found it difficult to "keep the band and my marriage together". "Blue for You" is a psychedelic blues track that was written about their former, deceased keyboardist, Rob Collins. "I'll Sing a Hymn (You Came to Me)", another one in the vein of Burgess' solo album, apes the sound of Bob Dylan circa New Morning (1970). Burgess said he tried emulating "Please Don't Leave Me Lonely" (1971) by King Floyd, though he admitted it was unsuccessful. "Loving You Is Easy" is a soul ballad that recalled the work of Minnie Riperton, who had a song with the same name. Rogers sings lead vocals on the track, though he did not wish to; he wished for the song to be dropped entirely, but the rest of the band wanted it on the album. "Try Again Today" is a Beatlesque ballad, co-written by Linus of Hollywood, who helped Burgess on I Believe. Burgess wanted to talk about "when things are not going that well [...] having another go" and not having high expectations. He said he was unhappy when he composed the lyrics to "Apples and Oranges". The album concludes with "Dead Love", which talks about communication with the band breaking down and Burgess feeling alone while promoting I Believe. It features cello and viola from Ian Bracken and Heather Wallington, respectively, of the Royal Liverpool Philharmonic.

== Release ==
American label MCA Records was absorbed by Universal Music Group (UMG) subsidiary Geffen Records in mid-2003, which resulted in its staff and roster being moved to Geffen. As a result, the band was dropped from the roster. On 22 March 2004, Up at the Lake was announced for release in two months' time; alongside this, the track listing was posted online. The band debuted material from the album at two one-off shows in London in early May 2004. Initially planned for 3 May 2004, "Up at the Lake" was released as the album's lead single on 10 May 2004. The CD version included "For Where There Is Love, There Will Always Be Miracles", while the seven-inch vinyl edition featured "I'll Sing A Hymn (You Came to Me)" as the B-side. After being available to stream on the band's website two and a half weeks ahead of schedule, Up at the Lake was released on 17 May 2004. Its artwork was taken at Pickmere Lake in Cheshire, outside of Burgess' home town of Northwich.

In May and June 2004, the band embarked on a tour of the UK, leading up to appearances at the Isle of Wight, T in the Park, and Fleadh festivals. Additional shows were added, with two shows apiece in Glasgow and Manchester. "Try Again Today" was released as the album's second single on 26 July 2004. The CD edition featured "M.I.A.", "Give Me a Reason", and the music video for "Try Again Today", while the DVD version included videos of "Up at the Lake" and footage from Keele University, along with audio of "Try Again Today". while the seven-inch vinyl edition featured "I'll Sing A Hymn (You Came to Me)" as the B-side. In August 2004, the band performed at the V Festival. They ended the year with a short tour of the UK in December 2004; extra shows were added twice, increasing it to an eight-date tour. "Loving You Is Easy" was released as a radio-only promotional single on 20 December 2004. In April 2005, the band's second video album, Live at Last Brixton Academy, was released, consisting of footage from the December 2004 tour.

Up at the Lake was re-pressed on vinyl in 2018 through UMC, Universal's catalogue label. "Up at the Lake" and "Try Again Today" were featured on the band's third compilation album, Forever: The Singles (2006), while four demos from the sessions were included on the special edition version of it. "High Up Your Tree" and "Blue for You" appeared on their fourth compilation album, Collection (2007). "Up at the Lake" was included on their fifth compilation album, A Head Full of Ideas (2021).

== Reception ==
Professional ratings
Aggregate scores
Source	Rating
Metacritic	72/100
Review scores
Source	Rating
AllMusic	3.5/5 stars
Cokemachineglow	82%
Entertainment.ie	4/5 stars
Gigwise	4/5 stars
God Is in the TV	2/5
The Guardian	4/5 stars
Playlouder	2.5/5 stars
This Is Fake DIY	3/5 stars
Uncut	3/5 stars
Yahoo! Launch	7/10 stars

Up at the Lake was met with generally favourable reviews from music critics. At Metacritic, which assigns a normalised rating out of 100 to reviews from mainstream publications, the album received an average score of 72, based on 10 reviews.

Reviewers praised the songwriting. Damas felt that there was a "defined sense that this is the beginning of a new chapter for the band, and that Up at the Lake is their first work as 'mature' artists." He added that it was a "relaxed and assured record, the work of craftsmen who know how to produce something solid and consistent." Goldstein said it was "surprisingly their strongest effort" since Tellin' Stories, agreeing with Damas that they "actually sound[ed] relaxed," making it the type of album that the band could compose in their sleep. The Independent critic Andy Gill was also impressed, saying that the "relatively simple and direct Up at the Lake is a surprise", adding that it was the "most focused, coherent and unmediated that the band have sounded in years." Steve McQueen of Gigwise called it "soothingly British, with authentic flavourings throughout. Like an English summer's day – you cannot take this for granted." Chris Nye Browne of Yahoo! Launch said that "although, essentially, there's nothing exceptional here, as an album 'Up At The Lake' flows seamlessly."

Other critics felt that it was uninspiring. Entertainment.ie's Andrew Lynch wrote that "while it doesn't break any new ground, it's just as enjoyable" as their past releases. The staff at Uncut said it was "hardly the album-length E-rush of career peak Tellin' Stories (1997)," while Stephen Ackroyd of This Is Fake DIY said the band "[c]ould do worse, [or] could do a lot better." RTÉ.ie writer Seamus Leonard said "unfortunately the songs are pretty inconsistent", with "Cry Yourself to Sleep" and "I'll Sing a Hymn (You Came to Me)" being "well worth listening to, but [...] [t]he rest are reasonable but unremarkable." God Is in the TV's Alex Worsnip, meanwhile, thought they had "run their course at this stage, although they themselves seem positive about their direction. However, for the rest of us, 'Up At The Lake' will be both familiar and uninspiring". Playlouder writer Richard Smirke said the album "plays more like Burgess & Co hijacking Stars in Their Eyes, rather than a band trying to sound fresh or relevant in their fifteenth year. Unfortunately, as artistically redundant as that concept sounds, this 45-minute pop-rock opus doesn't fare much better."

Up at the Lake peaked at number 13 in the UK; it reached number 6 in Scotland and number 32 in Ireland. It was certified silver in the UK by the British Phonographic Industry 11 days after its release. "Up at the Lake" charted at number 20 in Scotland and number 23 in the UK. "Try Again Today" charted at number 24 in Scotland and the UK.

== Track listing ==
All songs by Martin Blunt, Jon Brookes, Tim Burgess, Mark Collins, and Tony Rogers, except "Try Again Today" by the band and Linus of Hollywood. "I'll Sing a Hymn (You Came to Me)" is not included on all versions.

1. "Up at the Lake" – 3:45
2. "Feel the Pressure" – 3:35
3. "As I Watch You in Disbelief" – 3:48
4. "Cry Yourself to Sleep" – 4:25
5. "Bona Fide Treasure" – 3:24
6. "High Up Your Tree" – 4:01
7. "Blue for You" – 3:56
8. "I'll Sing a Hymn (You Came to Me)" – 2:43
9. "Loving You Is Easy" – 5:00
10. "Try Again Today" – 3:42
11. "Apples and Oranges" – 4:20
12. "Dead Love" – 2:21

== Personnel ==
Personnel per sleeve.

The Charlatans

- Jon Brookes – drums, percussion
- Tim Burgess – lead vocals, underwater piano
- Mark Collins – guitars, pedal steel, backing vocals
- Tony Rogers – Hammond, piano, backing vocals, lead vocals (track 9)
- Martin Blunt – bass guitar

Additional musicians

- Ged Lynch – percussion (track 4)
- Ian Bracken – cello (track 12)
- Heather Wallington – viola (track 12)

Production and design

- The Charlatans – producer
- James Spencer – producer, mixing, engineer
- Ken Nelson – mixing
- The Chemical Brothers – mixing
- Mike Cave – additional engineering (track 10)
- Johnny Marr – compiler
- Linus of Hollywood – recording (track 10)
- Frank Arkwright – mastering
- Tom Sheehan – photography
- John Mark James – design

== Charts and certifications ==
=== Weekly charts ===
Chart performance for Up at the Lake
Chart (2004)	Peak position
Irish Albums (IRMA)	32
Scottish Albums (Official Charts)	6
UK Albums (Official Charts)	13

=== Certifications ===
Certifications for Up at the Lake
Region	Certification	Certified units/sales
United Kingdom (BPI)	Gold	100,000^{^}
^{^} Shipments figures based on certification alone.
