= I Believe (Tim Burgess album) =

Studio album by Tim Burgess
- Released: 8 September 2003
- Recorded: Late 2002
- Studios: Franklin Castle, Los Angeles, California
- Genre: Pop soul
- Length: 36:37
- Labels: PIAS Recordings; Straight Trippin
- Producer: Linus of Hollywood

Tim Burgess chronology
I Believe (2003)	Oh No I Love You (2012)

Singles from I Believe
- 1. "I Believe in the Spirit" Released: 25 August 2003; 2. "Only a Boy" Released: 3 November 2003

I Believe is the debut solo album by British rock musician Tim Burgess of the Charlatans, released on 8 September 2003 through the labels PIAS Recordings and Straight Trippin. Following promotion of the Charlatans' seventh studio album Wonderland (2001), Burgess started working with Linus of Hollywood. They recorded at the latter's place in Los Angeles, dubbed Franklin Castle, in late 2002. Burgess had co-written the majority of the songs with Linus. I Believe is a pop soul album that takes inspiration from the work of the Beach Boys, Curtis Mayfield and Joe Strummer.

I Believe received generally favourable reviews from music critics, many of whom praised the songwriting. It charted at number 28 in Scotland and number 38 in the United Kingdom, while "I Believe in the Spirit" reached number 44 and 54 in the UK, respectively. Before the album's release, Burgess went on a UK tour and performed at V Festival. At the end of this, "I Believe in the Spirit" was released as the album's lead single; "Only a Boy" followed in November 2003, which was promoted with another UK tour. I Believe was released in the United States through Koch Records; this was delayed due to the Charlatans promoting their eighth studio album Up at the Lake (2004).

== Background and recording ==
The Charlatans released their seventh studio album Wonderland in September 2001 through Universal Records. Promotion started with a tour of the United Kingdom in October 2001, and ended with a supporting slot for Stereophonics and three headlining club shows in August 2002. Frontman Tim Burgess wanted to continue writing, but the rest of the band members wanted a break. Around this time, he taught himself how to play guitar, though felt embarrassed to play it with others present. He expressed a desire to experiment with brass and string instrumentation. In October 2002, Dotmusic reported that Burgess was recording on his solo debut studio album, linking up with Linus of Hollywood. The pair shared a management team; Linus was known for his work with Lil' Kim, Puff Daddy and the Smashing Pumpkins. Burgess met Linus at The Cat & Fiddle pub, located on Sunset Boulevard in Los Angeles.

Days after this, the band denied potential rumours of them breaking up, explaining that the members are working on other projects, such as Burgess on his album. I Believe was recorded at the Franklin Castle, which was the name for Linus' apartment between Franklin Avenue and La Brea Avenue. As Burgess lived on the hills not far from Franklin, he would work there each day. The project evolved from an acoustic EP of simply Burgess and a guitar, until strings were added. He then had the urge to include a brass a section; a trumpeter was brought in initially to play on one song, but it eventually featured on four of them. After basic tracks were done, they showed the songs to other musicians they wished to have contribute to the recordings. When others heard it, they said he should include a single-sounding track, prompting him to compose "Only a Boy", "Oh My Corazon" and "Say Yes". In November 2002, Burgess took a break to go on a DJ tour of the UK; as recording continued, Burgess had planned to have it completed by the Christmas period. Linus served as the producer while Michael Patterson did additional production and mixed the album at Patty's House with assistance from Gary Dean.

== Composition and lyrics ==
Musically, the sound of I Believe has been described as pop soul, taking influences from the work of the Beach Boys, Curtis Mayfield and Joe Strummer. Burgess said Los Angeles, where he was living, served as inspiration for the album as it had for Wonderland and its predecessor Us and Us Only (1999) previously. He wrote the majority of the tracks on the ground floor of his house in the city; most of them were co-written with Linus. AllMusic reviewer Stephen Thomas Erlewine said it was "recognizably the work of the Charlatans' leader -- there is a similar fondness for laid-back, easy-rolling classic rock, sunny hooks, a vague infatuation with lite dance rhythms". When asked about the album title, Burgess said he "believe[s] in myself. I believe I've done a good job". For Mark Vischer's saxophone parts, Burgess asked him to watch Lost Highway (1997), which he said had a "pretty intense solo sax scene".

The opening track, "I Believe in the Spirit", has a 1970s West Coast atmosphere, with Burgess reprising his falsetto from the Wonderland track "Love Is the Key". It is a love song to Los Angeles, where he relocated to a few years prior. Discussing the song, Burgess said he "fell in love with the demeanour of almost everyone who works, serves and makes the place [Los Angeles] tick". Burgess described "Held in Straps" as "quite an angry song about starting something and leaving a trail behind". "Only a Boy" sees Burgess have nostalgia for being innocent in his youth and finding love, accompanied by what Jack Smith of BBC Music described as a "jangly pop backdrop, which is almost Caribbean in flavour". musicOMH writer David Welsh considered it to Badly Drawn Boy, circa The Hour of Bewilderbeast (2000), because of the "jangly guitar layered over some lively brass sections". Burgess said it was influenced by seeing homeless kids around Los Angeles. With "We All Need Love", Burgess wanted to write something with a wide appeal, akin to boy band lyrics Burgess wrote the lyrics to "Oh My Corazon" outside The Cat & Fiddle; he said he first heard the Spanish word Corazon in "Spanish Bombs" (1979) by the Clash.

"Be My Baby" is driven by cello and harmonica instrumentation, and features Burgess singing in falsetto again, in the vein of the Beach Boys and Kate Bush. He made a demo of it at a studio next door to The Cat & Fiddle while his friend Randy Billings was in attendance, who would receive co-writing credit. "Years Ago" is a country rock song that emulates the style of Bob Dylan. It was written at when Charlatans guitarist Mark Collins came to visit Burgess in Los Angeles, the pair had not seen one another for some time. "Say Yes" is a string-enhanced soul song that RTÉ.ie writer Anne-Louise Foley called "part disco and part Motown, it's 'Going Loco in Acapulco' with a mirror ball". The tack piano and horn section in "Love to Spend the Night" earned it a comparison to the work of the Band and Van Dyke Parks. It was the first track written for the album, and the sole one credited to only Burgess. The initial demo of it lasted over eight minutes and was done with an engineer in a studio on Sunset Sunset Boulevard. "Po' Boy Soul" deals with being driven; it deals with the consequences of him living in Los Angeles as the Charlatans were based in the United Kingdom. Burgess felt that the closing track, "All I Ever Do", recalled the work of Josh Schwartz, from Painted Hills while the ending evoked the sound of Crazy Horse.

== Release ==
In August 2003, Burgess embarked on a short tour of the UK, leading up to a performance at V Festival; his backing band was dubbed the Californian Angels. "I Believe in the Spirit" was released as the lead single from his forthcoming album on 25 August 2003. I Believe was released on 8 September 2003 through the labels PIAS Recordings and Straight Trippin. The Japanese edition included a cover of Bob Marley's "Who the Cap Fit" (1976) and a radio session version of "Years Ago" as bonus tracks, alongside the music video for "Only a Boy". "Only a Boy" was released as a single on 3 November 2003. That same month, Burgess went on another tour of the UK.

The US edition, released by Koch Records on 26 April 2005, featured "Who the Cap Fit", "Rough Time" and "I Believe in the West Coast" as bonus tracks. By the time it came out, the Charlatans had released their next album, Up at the Lake (2004), a year prior; two songs on it, namely "Cry Yourself to Sleep" and "I'll Sing a Hymn (You Came to Me)", continued the sound of I Believe. Burgess explained that he was unable to find a label for the US market when it was originally released, and while Koch had shown interest, he was busy with making Up at the Lake. When touring in support of that album ceased, Burgess focused on the US release of I Believe. He celebrated it with a one-off show in Los Angeles with members of Starsailor, who were recording in the city, as his backing band.

== Reception ==
Professional ratings
Review scores
Source	Rating
AllMusic	3/5 stars
BBC Manchester	8/10
Drowned in Sound	7/10
The Guardian	1/5 stars
No Ripcord	5/10
PopMatters	5/10
RTÉ.ie	5/5 stars

Erlewine felt that after the last few Charlatans releases, I Believe was a "nice relief, and the entire record has an appealing, relaxed vibe that makes it a good soundtrack for a sunny afternoon". Though he mentioned that none of the individual tracks were particular memorable, "but as a whole, it's a nice, friendly record that proves that it was a good idea for Burgess to go it alone this time around". Foley was equally impressed with the album, despite not liking Burgess' work with the Charlatans; Neil McKay of the Belfast Telegraph said that it shared nothing with the Charlatans, "which is a good start". Exclaim!'s Michael Edwards, meanwhile, said the "best songs are those that don't sound too different from the Charlatans, probably because that is when he sounds most comfortable".

Drowned in Sound writer Gareth Dobson worried that it would be a "hackneyed old Dylan/country affair", and was relieved that it was "actually a very good collection of white boy pop soul". He considered the album's best moments to be when it "goes all out with massive arrangements and joyful tunes", singling out "Only a Boy" and "We All Need Love". Aidin Vaziri of SFGATE was surprised that Burgess created a record that successfully honoured all of his influences "without simply falling breathlessly at their Cuban boot heels". The staff at BBC Manchester wrote that it was a "decent album. There are moments when Burgess maybe should have reined himself in a little, but they are few and far between".

Welsh said Burgess comes across as a "man indulging himself, eventually free of his band" and the lyrics were "competent, but nothing more really" The Guardian's David Peschek highlighted a lyric from "I Believe in the Spirit" and followed it by saying that if that "doesn't make you wince, then the uncomfortable falsetto of Be My Baby, the lame white 1980s funk of Say Yes and the shocking banality of the chorus to Oh My Corazon probably will". Peter Mattinson of No Ripcord said that the opening song was "unfortunately the best thing to be found here by some way" as the "songwriting talent that kept the Charlatans afloat during their darker days has seemingly deserted Burgess".

I Believe charted at number 28 in Scotland and number 38 in the UK. In 2007, he estimated that it sold around 50,000 copies in the UK. "I Believe in the Spirit" reached number 44 in the UK, while "Only a Boy" peaked at number 54.

== Track listing ==
Writing credits per booklet.

I Believe track listing
No.	Title	Writer(s)	Length
1.	"I Believe in the Spirit"	Tim Burgess; Linus of Hollywood	4:05
2.	"Held in Straps"	T. Burgess; Linus	2:51
3.	"Only a Boy"	T. Burgess; Linus	3:16
4.	"We All Need Love"	T. Burgess; Linus	3:56
5.	"Oh My Corazon"	T. Burgess; Linus	3:24
6.	"Be My Baby"	T. Burgess; Randy Billings	4:02
7.	"Years Ago"	T. Burgess; Linus; Michelle Burgess; Mark Collins	2:10
8.	"Say Yes"	T. Burgess; Linus	3:04
9.	"Love to Spend the Night"	T. Burgess	4:13
10.	"Po' Boy Soul"	T. Burgess; Linus	1:56
11.	"All I Ever Do"	T. Burgess; Linus	3:45

== Personnel ==
Personnel per booklet.

Musicians

- Tim Burgess – instruments
- Linus of Hollywood – instruments
- Adan Narcello – percussion (track 1), drums (tracks 2–5, 8, 9 and 11)
- Gary Dean – drums (track 1)
- Roger Joseph Manning Jr. – keys (tracks 1–4 and 9–11)
- Mark Visher – sax (tracks 1 and 11)
- Jimmy Levine – keys (tracks 2 and 8)
- Probyn Gregory – horns (tracks 3–5, 8 and 9), wah guitar (track 3)
- Carrie Bartsch – violin (tracks 4 and 11)
- Peggy Baldwin – cello (tracks 6 and 8)
- Amir Yaghmai – cello (track 6), violin (track 8)
- Aaron Kaplan – acoustic guitar (track 7), acoustic slide guitar (track 7)
- Bruce Witkin – upright bass (track 9)

Production and design

- Linus of Hollywood – producer, recording
- Michael Patterson – mix, additional production
- Gary Dean – assistant
- Tom Sheehan – photography
- Soap Design Co., LA – design

== Charts ==
Chart performance for I Believe
Chart (2003)	Peak position
Scottish Albums (Official Charts)	28
UK Albums (Official Charts)	38

== See also ==
- Extra Texture (Read All About It) – a 1975 soul album by rock musician George Harrison, similarly recorded in Los Angeles
