= Wonderland (The Charlatans album) =

Studio album by the Charlatans
- Released: 10 September 2001
- Recorded: 2000–2001
- Studios: Krevorkian's Lab, Los Angeles, California; Big Mushroom, Middlewich, Cheshire
- Genres: Funk-soul; electronica
- Length: 57:31
- Label: Universal
- Producers: The Charlatans; Danny Saber; James Spencer

The Charlatans chronology
Us and Us Only (1999)	Wonderland (2001)	Up at the Lake (2004)

Singles from Wonderland
- 1. "Love Is the Key" Released: 27 August 2001; 2. "A Man Needs to Be Told" Released: 19 November 2001

Wonderland is the seventh studio album by British rock band the Charlatans, released on 10 September 2001 through Universal. Following promotional efforts for their sixth studio album, Us and Us Only, vocalist Tim Burgess and guitarist Mark Collins wrote new material at the former's house in Los Angeles, California. Cocaine would have an impact on the writing and, later on, recording; sessions were held at producer Danny Saber's house studio, Krevorkian's Lab, also in Los Angeles. The band worked with him for seven weeks in October 2000, only completing five tracks, and later went to their own studio, Big Mushroom in Middlewich, Cheshire, in early 2001. Wonderland is a funk-soul and electronica record, evoking the work of John Mellencamp, Oasis, and Primal Scream. Burgess remarked that Los Angeles itself became a member of the band; critics referred to it as a drug-enhanced party album. He employed a falsetto in the vein of Curtis Mayfield and Kurt Wagner.

Wonderland received generally positive reviews from music critics, many of whom praised its sound, while Burgess' falsetto drew mixed responses. It charted at number one in Scotland, number two in the UK, and number nine in Ireland, later being certified gold in the UK. "Love Is the Key" reached the top 20 in Scotland and the UK, while "A Man Needs to Be Told" made it to the top 40 in both territories. Bookended by two European festivals, the Charlatans played a few shows in the United States. "Love Is the Key" was released as the lead single from the album in August 2001; they promoted the album with club nights where people could hear it prior to its release. They went on a tour of the UK in October 2001, and in the following month, "A Man Needs to Be Told" was released as the next single. They closed out the year with a three-date arena tour with Starsailor, who would then support the band on their US tour in early 2002. Over the next few months, they performed at a mixture of festivals and did sporadic headlining shows.

== Background and writing ==
The Charlatans released their sixth studio album, Us and Us Only, in October 1999 through Universal, which peaked at number two on the UK Albums Chart. All three of its singles reached the top 40 in the UK Singles Chart, with both "Forever" and "Impossible" sitting in the top 15. It was promoted with two UK tours and a North American trek with Stereophonics. The first track that was written for their next album was "A Man Needs to Be Told", which vocalist Tim Burgess, guitarist Mark Collins, and James Spencer made a demo of. Burgess sang over it in a falsetto, which he was inspired to do after listening to Nixon (2000) by Lambchop and After the Gold Rush (1970) by Neil Young. In June 2000, Collins visited Burgess at his place in Los Angeles, California, to write material. The band had several discussions about him living there while the rest of them remained in Manchester and whether they would be able to make it work.

Burgess wanted their music to find success in Los Angeles, which he kept in mind while working on songs for their next album. He planned out where it would be written, what it would be called, and who would be picked to produce it. He explained that drugs had an impact on the process: "LA coke, lots of it, dealers at the house 24/7 [...] And the environment changed the sound, the sun flooded in, the shutters were open and the ideas were flowing". Burgess and Collins wrote together for two weeks, coming up with "Love Is the Key", "Right On", and "Love to You" in the process. When they were seeing the sights and driving along the freeways, they would be listening to the classic rock stations, playing the likes of Isaac Hayes and Sly and the Family Stone. On one occasion, "Be Thankful for What You Got" (1974) by William DeVaughn came on, and the pair looked at each other, deciding that this was the type of song they wanted the next album to emulate. The pair then met with producer Danny Saber, who was a friend of Collins; when the Charlatans previously played the city, Saber and the band would always hang out. The trio made a version of "Love Is the Key", which they sent to the rest of the band and asked if they wanted to work with Saber.

== Recording ==
Burgess said that while Us and Us Only received ample promotion, it was not the type of album their label had expected, and thus decided not to tell them that the band was working on another in the meantime. A week before recording was due to commence, the rest of the band arrived in Los Angeles and initially visited clubs and watched other artists perform. They stayed at the Oakwood Apartments on Barham Boulevard, close to Universal Studios Hollywood, and made a set-up in Collins' room where they could record potential ideas for songs. In October 2000, the NME reported that the band would release their next album in early 2001. That same month, recording was underway at Saber's residence on Wonderland Avenue in Los Angeles, dubbed Krevorkian's Lab. Burgess intentionally wanted them to record here in an attempt to leave the band's comfort zone, such as the members not being able to see their family on a nightly basis, which he felt hampered the making of Us and Us Only. He wanted to be as far away as possible from Manchester, thinking that Los Angeles had as wide a musical palette to take from as Manchester did, naming a variety of artists from the Beach Boys, the Byrds, and the Flying Burrito Brothers, among others.

Burgess would be dropped off at the band's apartments around midday, and they would drive to the studio. He mentioned that the atmosphere in Saber's place affected the songs; they spent the daytime writing and would later be recording in a blacked-out room on the third floor that they referred to as the "junkie den". The rest of the band had brought some of the ideas they had from the UK and would continue writing in Saber's kitchen. According to Burgess, each member at one point exclaimed that they were either "not going to have a mad one or we weren't going to go crazy at all" as they worked. By this point, they had finished 5 songs out of the planned 16 they were aiming to do. Though work was initially continuous, with them starting at 3 p.m., the work period would start later, eventually beginning at 4 a.m. Burgess' sole explanation was taking a large amount of cocaine, to the point he would have a dealer around him constantly who would take to sleeping on the sofa at Collins' apartment. Burgess praised Saber's expertise as a producer and a multi-instrumentalist, though he would brand him an egomaniac for being under the impression that bassist Martin Blunt, drummer Jon Brookes, and keyboardist Tony Rogers were holding the band back.

After making his debut with the band on their previous album, Rogers wanted to be more involved on Wonderland. Burgess said Saber was not receptive to this, as he only wished to work with Burgess and Collins. Saber slowly started to give Rogers respect after learning of his contributions to "You're So Pretty – We're So Pretty" and "Is It in You?". Burgess and Collins would perform over beats that Saber created; Saber or Twiggy Ramirez would play bass, and Stacy Plunk would sing additional vocals. Plunk was Saber's girlfriend and was previously a backing vocalist for the likes of Jerry Lee Lewis and Ann Peebles. As she could sing for a variety of musical styles, the Charlatans would create melodies with her in mind. While they worked with Saber for seven weeks, Rogers said they were only able to finish five tracks with Saber before they went home. In early 2001, the band then returned to the UK to do additional production work at their own studio, Big Mushroom, in Cheshire, Greater Manchester. The band and Spencer produced all of the songs; Saber is also credited with producing six of them. Though Saber had promised to mix the album, it was instead mixed by Spencer at Big Mushroom. The band realised that Saber would not be able to function outside of Los Angeles, with Blunt in particular being disappointed. Burgess said that with Saber absent, "some of the [audio] space began to get filled up", ending up more polished than if Saber had done it, as he would have "kept it completely stripped down".

== Composition and lyrics ==
=== Overview ===
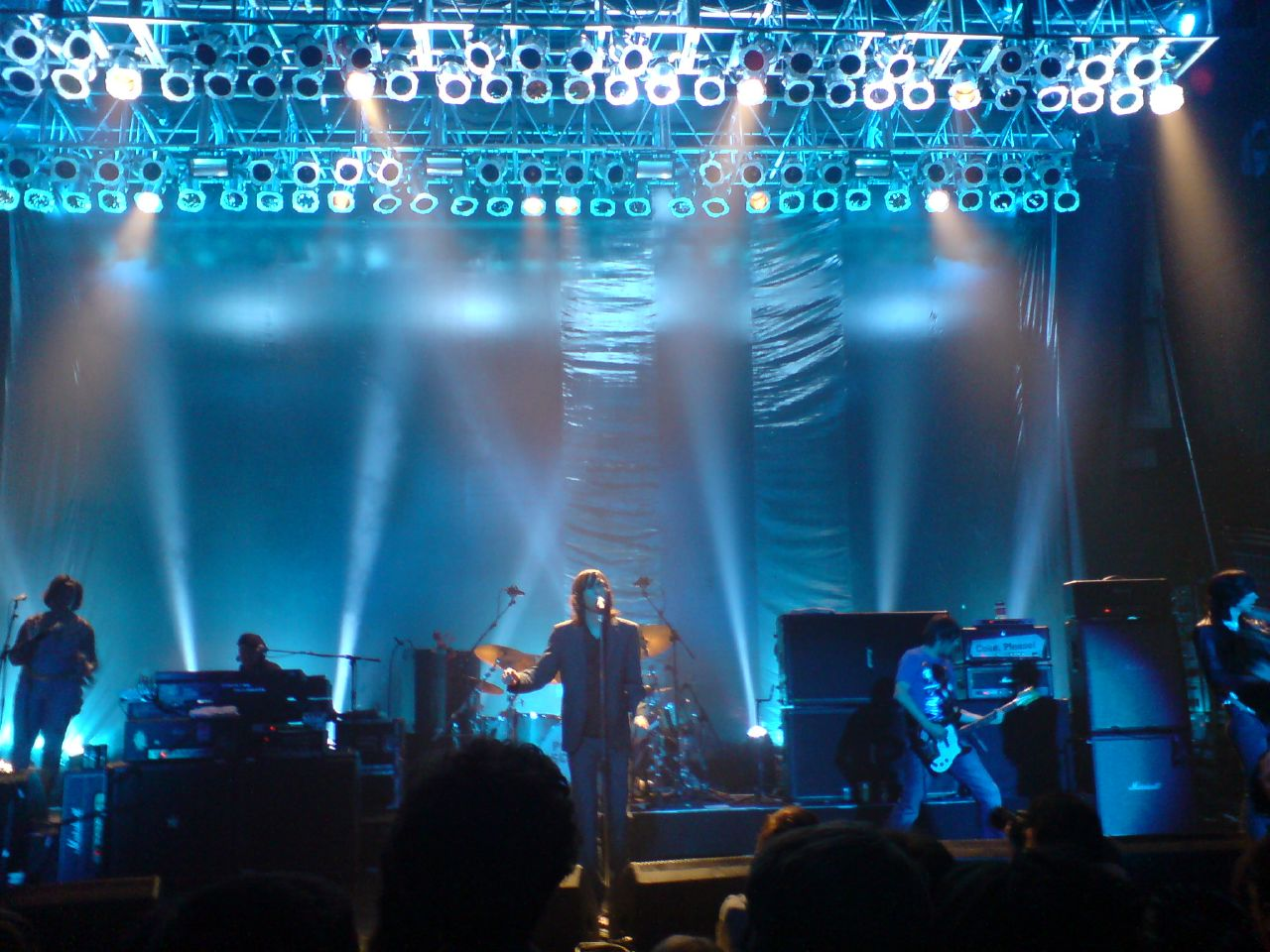
Primal Scream was one of the comparisons made to the album's sound.

Musically, Wonderland has been described as funk-soul and electronica, drawing comparisons to the work of John Mellencamp, Oasis, and Primal Scream, particularly the latter's Give Out But Don't Give Up (1994). Burgess said it was directly influenced by Californian soul music; he added that they allowed "Los Angeles to join as a sixth member and take over the band". Neil Leeds of Drowned in Sound described it as the band's "soundtrack to an after show party", with an "effervescent theme [that] is maintained throughout, that theme being the good times". NME writer Ted Kessler called it a "great party record [...] We're talking about an ecstasy and cocaine party, to be precise", and the "various mood swings that any party fuelled by those chemicals involves". Burgess said the band had disregarded their former "church organ sound and that's a great religious, spiritual moment for us", though it returns on "Judas". Throughout the album, he sang with a falsetto, leading to comparisons of Lambchop frontman Kurt Wagner and Curtis Mayfield, which was a shift away from the Bob Dylan tone that he used on Us and Us Only. In a contemporary interview, Burgess explained that he was not "consciously looking for new influences" and that "when the sun's shining [in Los Angeles,] you want to make music that's appropriate." In his autobiography Telling Stories (2012), he said that he found a copy of Mayfield's Back to the World (1973) in his wife's collection but was otherwise unaware of his other music outside of the Impressions and Super Fly (1972).

Various musicians contributed to the recordings: Ged Lynch with percussion on "Judas", "Love Is the Key", "Wake Up", and "Ballad of the Band"; Plunk with backing vocals on "Love Is the Key", "A Man Needs to Be Told" and "Is It in You?"; Yvonne Marx with backing vocals on "Love Is the Key" and "Ballad of the Band"; Daniel Lanois with pedal steel on "A Man Needs to Be Told"; and Jim Keltner with percussion on "A Man Needs to Be Told". Alongside this, Ramirez and Bernard Fowler sang backing vocals on "You're So Pretty – We're So Pretty", with the former also performing additional bass. Burgess said these two, who would be around Saber's house, were initially left uncredited in the album's liner notes. He was aware of Lanois from his past work with U2, but focused on him more when he appeared on Dylan's Time Out of Mind (1997), which also featured Keltner.

=== Tracks ===
The opening track, "You're So Pretty – We're So Pretty", features looping beats and chunky bass, which evoke Saber's previous work on Black Grape's debut album. During the writing of the album, Burgess said he had been consuming a lot of hip hop music, namely Ol' Dirty Bastard and his track "Got Your Money" (1999). He wanted to write his own song with money as the focal point; "show me the money" was a popular saying during this period, which is what Burgess built a track around. The title "You're So Pretty – We're So Pretty" was adapted from a chapter name in Pure Drivel (1998) by Steve Martin. Saber changed the speed of the demo that Blunt and Rogers had made, which was one of the few ideas that they brought over from the UK. "Judas" was another demo that was brought over but lacked a chorus section, which was promptly written by Burgess, Collins, and Rogers. It talks about their former accountant, who had been caught embezzling half a million pounds, and recalled "November Spawned a Monster" (1990) by Morrissey. In discussing the song, Burgess spoke about the biblical figure Judas Iscariot and when the name was used against Bob Dylan. He explained that being "in and around a band, characters come and go", and the song was written with these people in mind. He said the "antithesis of betrayal is loyalty", and he wanted the track to be about that, writing some of the lyrics at the King's Head pub in Middlewich.

"Love Is the Key" is a funk rock track that takes inspiration from R&B. It borrows the guitar riff from "The One I Love" (1987) by R.E.M. and sees Burgess emulate the voice of Beck. "A Man Needs to Be Told", a country-soul song, recalls "Step on My Old Size Nines" (2001) by Stereophonics and has a near-Latin beat. It shifts into drum and bass and gospel during its breakdown section. The track was reminiscent of the roots-esque atmosphere of Us and Us Only, exemplified by Lanois' pedal steel guitarwork. Four lines of lyrics for it, which would become the second verse, came to Burgess during a dream. He thought of the title while the band were in a pub during a break from recording songs for Us and Us Only, when he received a text: "Sometimes, Tim Burgess, you need to be told". He promptly went back to the studio and played on the piano what would become the track's intro section. He said the track was an intentional response to music "becoming macho again" following the Britpop movement and lad culture. It was written shortly after Us and Us Only, intended as a B-side to "Impossible" until they thought otherwise.

In "I Just Can't Get Over Losing You", Pitchfork contributor Joe Tangari wrote that Collins entwines "dozens of little stuttering passages through the mix, vying with Rogers for control of the harmonic and countermelodic space". Burgess compared it to "My Beautiful Friend" and the Tellin' Stories (1997) outtake "Title Fight". "The Bell and the Butterfly" was named after a book that Collins was reading, The Diving Bell and the Butterfly (1997) by Jean-Dominique Bauby. It is a four-minute-long instrumental that centres around the bass guitar and drums; Tangari said it begins with a massive, "fuzzed-out bass riff, then completely recontextualizes the riff with programmed, almost junglist beats". Brookes' kit returns as Blunt reprises his bass part from "Love Is the Key". "And If I Fall", which was initially named "California" for the sole purpose of getting a rise out of Blunt, shares the same haunting atmosphere as "Every Breath You Take" (1983) by the Police. Collins' added an Al Green-like guitar part during the verse sections at the suggestion of Burgess. Rogers and Spencer added a chorus section that angered Burgess; the latter's talking in the song was influenced by Kevin Rowland of Dexys Midnight Runners.

"Wake Up", which was originally titled "Ballad of the Band", opens with a guitar riff in the vein of King Crimson's 1980s before shifting into a ballad; the guitars eventually become enhanced by wah-wah pedals. Blunt mentioned that it took inspiration from David Axelrod, while Burgess said the lyrics were influenced by the Politicians and that the "moral of this story is that you can never have too much too late." "Is It in You?" is centred around a Mellotron and a piano and deals with standing up for one's self. It includes references to the poem Love Replied by Allen Ginsberg and "Burning Love" (1972) by Elvis Presley. "Ballad of the Band", which was originally named "Ianocce" apes the work of Sly Stone, and details the Charlatans' history. It takes its name from the 1986 song of the same name by Felt; Burgess previously lifted the chord progression of Felt's song for "White Shirt" from the Charlatans' debut album, Some Friendly (1990). Jason Cohen of CMJ New Music Monthly wrote that "breathtaking balladry comes to the fore with the mind/body/spirit R&B devotional" of "Love to You". Burgess called it a cross between Mayfield and former Beatle George Harrison, describing it as "love gone sour" and "falling out" with family.

== Release and promotion ==
On 10 April 2001, Wonderland was announced for release in five months' time. On 25 June 2001, the band posted a video from recording sessions for the album on their website. The audio of the video included "You're So Pretty – We're So Pretty", "Judas", and "Love Is the Key", marking the debut of these new songs. Three days later, they premiered five tracks from the album during a show in Wrexham, Wales, and then appeared at Rockwave Festival in Greece. A week later, they filmed a music video for "Love Is the Key" in Los Angeles. In July and August 2001, the band played a handful of US shows with support from Black Rebel Motorcycle Club, leading up to an appearance at the Witnness festival in Ireland. On 11 August 2001, it was announced that Rogers had been diagnosed with a form of cancer hours before the Wrexham show two months prior. Rogers had first noticed signs of cancer several months ago but "didn't go back to the doctor because we were in the middle of the album. I didn't want to disrupt things." Despite this, the band informed the media that they would still be performing at V Festival and its preceding warm-up show later in the month.

"Love Is the Key" was released as the lead single from the album on 27 August 2001; Blunt had wanted "Judas" instead. It included a radio edit of "Love Is the Key" alongside "It's About Time" and "Viva La Sociale" as its B-sides; a promotional 12-inch edition featured the album versions of "Love Is the Key" and "The Bell and the Butterfly" with a So Solid Crew remix of "Love Is the Key". Advertisements for the single, which featured a man kneeling before a woman, had to be withdrawn due to complaints from readers of a newspaper. The UK's Advertising Standards Authority (ASA) said they had two complaints after the advert had been seen in The Mirror. Universal's marketing director, Jason Iley, said, "There is no nudity and, if people look closely, they will see the man's image is actually projected onto the woman's body." Universal said the man was kissing the wall behind the woman. The ASA would later reject these complaints, stating that the advertisement was "neither sexually explicit nor pornographic" and "unlikely to cause serious or widespread offence". From late August until early September 2001, the band hosted club nights where people would listen to the entire album ahead of its release.

Wonderland was released on 10 September 2001 through Universal, while the US release happened the following day through MCA Records. The band had planned to play six shows in the US, but they were cancelled following the September 11 terrorist attacks. In October 2001, they embarked on a tour across the UK. Though planned for release on 12 November 2001, "A Man Needs to Be Told" was released as the album's second single on 19 November 2001. Two versions were released on CD: the first with a radio edit of "A Man Needs to Be Told", the music video for the track, as well as "Shotgun" and a remix of "Ballad of the Band", while the second version included "All I Desire" and a live version of "Love Is the Key". The music video was directed by Kevin Godley, who convinced the band members to be suspended by harnesses upside down for a 15-hour filming shoot. They ended the year with a three-date arena tour with support from Starsailor. The band promoted the single with a signing session the following day at a HMV store in London. That same month, Rogers received cancer treatment, with more scheduled soon afterwards. In January 2002, the band toured across the US, with Starsailor supporting them again. In February 2002, the band played a one-off show as part of the NME's series of performances at the London Astoria throughout the month. They followed this up with a short Irish tour a few days later and a trip to Japan.

"You're So Pretty – We're So Pretty" was announced as the third single from the album for release in March 2002 and then on 8 April; however, three days before release, it was cancelled. The band said the single would not be released under a mutual agreement they had with the label. A spokesperson on behalf of them said that the band was not satisfied with the DVD version and delayed it until after festival performances later in the year. It was planned to feature a radio edit and remix of "You're So Pretty – We're So Pretty" alongside "Room 518" as its B-side, while the 12-inch edition was expected to swap the radio edit of "You're So Pretty – We're So Pretty" for the album version and "Silly Thing" in favour of "Room 518". Later in April 2002, the band performed at the Coachella festival in the US. Two months later, they appeared at the Isle of Wight Festival, supported Oasis for a one-off show at Finsbury Park in London, and headlined Glastonbury Festival. They played a one-off, homecoming show at the Debating Hall in Manchester on 10 July 2002. Initially planned for 15 July 2002, they released a live album on 22 July 2002, dubbed Live It Like You Love It, which had been recorded during the Manchester date of their December 2001 arena tour. A DVD of said tour was in the works, though this never materialised. Following a supporting slot for Stereophonics at Slane Castle in Dublin, Ireland, in August 2002, the band played three club shows to round out the month.

Wonderland was re-pressed on vinyl in 2018 through UMC, Universal's catalogue label; Live It Like You Love It received the same treatment in 2020. "Love Is the Key" and "A Man Needs to Be Told" were featured on the band's third compilation album, Forever: The Singles (2006). A remake of "You're So Pretty – We're So Pretty", worked on by Martin "Youth" Glover, was released in 2006 and included on that compilation. The original version of "You're So Pretty – We're So Pretty", alongside "Ballad of the Band" and the radio edit of "Love Is the Key", was included on their fourth compilation album Collection (2007). "Love Is the Key" and "A Man Needs to Be Told" were then featured on their fifth compilation album, A Head Full of Ideas (2021). The box set edition of that compilation included a demo titled "C'mon, C'mon"; the track had been found on a CD at Burgess' mother's house with rough mixes of Wonderland tracks.

== Reception ==
Professional ratings
Aggregate scores
Source	Rating
Metacritic	75/100
Review scores
Source	Rating
AllMusic	3/5 stars
Blender	3/5 stars
Dotmusic	4.5/5
Drowned in Sound	4/5 stars
NME	8/10
Pitchfork	7.8/10
Playlouder	4/5 stars
RTÉ.ie	4/5 stars
Stylus Magazine	6.7/10
Under the Radar	8/10
The Rolling Stone Album Guide	2/5 stars

Wonderland was met with generally favourable reviews from music critics. At Metacritic, which assigns a normalised rating out of 100 to reviews from mainstream publications, the album received an average score of 75, based on 17 reviews.

Reviewers focused on the album's sound. NME writer Ted Kessler summarised it as an "equally light and heavy party record" with a "sunny new atmosphere". AllMusic reviewer Stephen Thomas Erlewine noted that the music was "very heavy on groove and texture, a move that's strangely" aided by Burgess' "unexpected reliance on a falsetto". Blender's Johnny Black said that alongside the "grooves, the songs boast actual tunes and choruses, featuring an unexpectedly soulful swagger in the guitar rhythms". Ian Wade of Dotmusic called it "magnificent. An album full of cracking tunes, potential singles and a new found lust for life", which Leeds agreed with. Tangari said that if it had been released earlier in the band's career, it "would almost certainly have been held up as a future classic. A decade later, it simply sounds damn good". RTÉ.ie writer Luke McManus said apart from a few dudes, namely "Right On" and "Love to You", the album was the "overall result is the sound of a band waking up to produce their best work in years". Jon Monks of Stylus Magazine said after "A Man Needs to be Told", the album loses "steam and becomes more a melting pot of tunes that feel rushed and generally of a lower calibre than the top heavy first half". The A.V. Club's Josh Modell was more dismissive, stating that the rare occasions on the album that "make sense in the context of the band's history are overshadowed by a musical reach that exceeds its grasp."

Mixed comments were made about Burgess' voice, particularly his choice to sing in falsetto. Tangari said that while his falsetto was not as "strong as his usual singing voice, it works surprisingly well in most places". He added that it "feels more at home surrounded by the keening guitars and extra percussion" in "A Man Needs to Be Told". Wade said the falsetto improved some songs, such as "I Just Can't Get Over Losing You" and "Wake Up", as they were "lifted into more confident, free and funkier dimensions", which Alix Buscovic of Playlouder agreed on the former track. Under the Radar writer Mark Redfern admitted that the falsetto took a period of getting used to, as it was "once embarrassing and bold," but now "this new approach signals a definitive change of direction for the band". Monks was less receptive, saying that "more often than not", it lands "between Barry Gibb and the squeaky voiced teen from The Simpsons" instead of Marvin Gaye. Modell added that it came across as having a "strange, often embarrassing effect [...] his new voice just sounds silly." Now's Matt Galloway suggested that the remainder of the band should have mentioned to Burgess that "warbling in a ridiculous falsetto throughout much of Wonderland wasn't such a good idea." Matt Cibula of PopMatters reassured listeners to not be "afraid of what you’ve heard about The Falsetto. It's not overused, and it doesn't ruin anything." Kessler, meanwhile, preferred it when Burgess was singing normally, saying that he was in the "best form of his career. This is Tim Burgess finally, really singing from the heart, unselfconsciously and true. It's great".

Wonderland peaked at number two on the UK Albums Chart, being held from the top spot by A Funk Odyssey (2001) by Jamiroquai, while in Scotland, it topped the albums chart. Outside of these territories, it charted at number nine in Ireland. It was certified gold in the UK by the British Phonographic Industry three weeks after its release. "Love Is the Key" charted at number 16 in the UK and number 12 in Scotland. while "A Man Needs to Be Told" reached number 31 in the UK and number 30 in Scotland. NME and Q listed Wonderland as one of the best 50 albums of 2001.

== Track listing ==
All songs by Martin Blunt, Jon Brookes, Tim Burgess, Mark Collins, and Tony Rogers. "Right On" and "Love to You" are only featured on the UK version of the album and thus not included on all editions.

1. "You're So Pretty – We're So Pretty" – 4:44
2. "Judas" – 4:04
3. "Love Is the Key" – 4:28
4. "A Man Needs to Be Told" – 4:33
5. "I Just Can't Get Over Losing You" – 4:54
6. "The Bell and the Butterfly" – 4:17
7. "And If I Fall" – 5:18
8. "Wake Up" – 5:10
9. "Is It in You?" – 4:45
10. "Ballad of the Band" – 5:56
11. "Right On" – 4:22
12. "Love to You" – 4:54

== Personnel ==
Personnel per booklet.

The Charlatans

- Tim Burgess – lead vocals
- Mark Collins – guitars
- Tony Rogers – organ, piano
- Martin Blunt – bass guitar
- Jon Brookes – drums

Additional musicians

- Ged Lynch – percussion (tracks 2, 3, 8, and 10)
- Stacy Plunk – backing vocals (tracks 3, 4, and 9)
- Yvonne Marx – backing vocals (tracks 3 and 10)
- Daniel Lanois – pedal steel (track 4)
- Jim Keltner – percussion (track 4)

Production and design

- The Charlatans – producer
- Danny Saber – producer (tracks 1–4, 8, and 9)
- James Spencer – producer, mixing
- Sinisha Nisevic – photography
- Ben Young – art direction, design

== Charts and certifications ==
=== Weekly charts ===
Chart performance for Wonderland
Chart (2001)	Peak position
Irish Albums (IRMA)	9
Scottish Albums (Official Charts)	1
UK Albums (Official Charts)	2

=== Certifications ===
Certifications for Wonderland
Region	Certification	Certified units/sales
United Kingdom (BPI)	Gold	100,000^{^}
^{^} Shipments figures based on certification alone.

== See also ==
- I Believe – Burgess' next release after Wonderland
- Yes Please! – the 1992 album by Happy Mondays, which similarly had a drug-fuelled creation
- It's Great When You're Straight...Yeah – the 1995 debut album by Black Grape, also produced by Saber and shares a similar musical style
