= Tim Book Two: Vinyl Adventures from Istanbul to San Francisco =

2016 book by Tim Burgess

- Author: Tim Burgess
- Language: English
- Subject: Record collecting
- Genre: Music
- Publisher: Faber & Faber
- Publication date: 21 July 2016
- Publication place: United Kingdom
- Media type: Print
- Pages: 272
- ISBN: 9780571314751
- OCLC: 959367697

Tim Book Two: Vinyl Adventures from Istanbul to San Francisco is a 2016 book by Tim Burgess, about him traveling around the world to find specific albums on vinyl.

== Background and writing ==
Tim Burgess of the Charlatans released his first book, Telling Stories, in April 2012. It told the history of that band as they experienced the Madchester and Britpop movements in the 1990s. While promoting the book, Burgess said he had been writing notes for a follow-up, tentatively titled Tim Book Two. He began working on it in earnest following him becoming father, the death of drummer John Brookes in August 2013 and the band working on what would become the 12th studio album Modern Nature (2015). Following the success of Telling Stories and Modern Nature, publisher Faber & Faber became attached to the project, who were expecting it to be completed by May 2015.

Burgess initially envisioned his second book to be a miscellany, before his focus shifted to vinyl records, which had more meaning to him. He amassed a collection of around 3,000 records, having started buying them in 1975. He then thought that if he could have "someone to recommend them I can write about what they mean to me, and what the record means to them". Burgess previously bought albums based solely on the artwork, regardless if he knew the music beforehand. Burgess eventually finished the book in December 2015.

== Content and publication ==
When people would ask Burgess what his second book would be called, he would reply with "Tim Book Two" sarcastically, not expecting to take him seriously. It was a homophone of Timbuktu, a city in Mali, which Burgess said "always been used to suggest somewhere far away, hard to get to and, generally, not round here". In Tim Book Two: Vinyl Adventures from Istanbul to San Francisco, Burgess contacted people he admired and asked them to propose an album that he should buy while traveling. Discussing the vinyl format specifically, he said: "You can tell a lot from the music people recommend for you, not just their all time favourite LP but maybe a hidden gem in their collection or something they think you might not have heard."

Burgess had talked to David Lynch, Johnny Marr, Cosey Fanni Tutti and Iggy Pop, among others. Burgess met some people by chance, such as seeing Neil Tennant of Pet Shop Boys walking down a street or talking to Boy George after a show. Burgess related Lynch's chosen album, Trout Mask Replica (1969) by Captain Beefheart, to the Tim Peaks brand of coffee he created, proceeds of which go to Lynch's Foundation. Alongside this, Burgess gave his own opinion on each album. The traveling allowed him to witness how record shops survived in the digital era of the music industry amidst the vinyl revival.

Burgess said the shops in mainland Europe were successful on their own, while some stores in the UK, such as Rise Records in Bristol and Pie and Vinyl in Southsea had to resort to selling beverages. Each chapter lasts two-to-six pages and is dedicated for each person that selected an album, totalling 52 chapters. One of the chapters revolves around Bookes and Burgess' attempt at writing an obituary for him. On 6 April 2016, Tim Book Two: Vinyl Adventures from Istanbul to San Francisco was announced for release, and was published by Faber & Faber on 21 July 2016, initially as a specially signed edition limited to 500 copies.

The book's artwork was designed by Pete Fowler, known for his pieces for Super Furry Animals, as well as the Monsterism Island toy range. Coinciding with this, a various artists compilation was released on Burgess' own label O Genesis, featuring some of the songs mentioned in the book. It was promoted with a short book tour in Norwich, London, Manchester and Liverpool. A paperback iteration followed in May 2017. Alongside this, a record store was opened under the name Vinyl Adventures, stocking albums listed in the book, plus others from the O Genesis catalogue. A custom record player was built by Rega Research, decaled with the artwork by Fowler.

== Reception ==
Janine and Lee Bullman of Loud and Quiet considered it one of the best releases of 2016, calling it an "utterly fantastic book, required reading" for anyone record hunting. Louder Than War writer Sarah Lay said it was a "chatty, anecdote-laden page-turner" that is a "great addition to any music-lovers bookshelf; a light and entertaining read fully brought to life by the accompanying soundtrack".

Record Collector's Alix Buscovic wrote that Burgess's writing style is "light and conversational; he’s funny, engaging, genuinely passionate and ever ready with an anecdote". He said that having an "overarching narrative and more depth would take this beyond what is, ultimately, an entertaining diversion". Popdose writer Rob Ross stated: "For those of us who love, understand, appreciate and are immersed in music, this is one of those rare moments when someone is able to say what you want to say but often can’t express".

Discussing the soundtrack, Henry Lewis of Skiddle wrote that it "works extremely well given the amount of varying styles that have been thrown together to create it". The Irish Times writer Tony Clayton-Lea said the album is an "eclectic blast from start to finish, as it takes us on Burgess’s titular worldwide trek" through its variety of artists.
