= Oh No I Love You =

Studio album by Tim Burgess
- Released: 1 October 2012
- Recorded: 2011–2012
- Genre: Indie, experimental pop
- Label: OGenesis
- Producer: Tim Burgess, Kurt Wagner

Tim Burgess chronology
I Believe (2003)	Oh No I Love You (2012)	As I Was Now (2018)

Singles from Oh No I Love You
- 1. "A Case For Vinyl" Released: 21 April 2012; 2. "White" Released: November 2012

Oh No I Love You is the second studio album by the British singer Tim Burgess. It was released in 2012.

Louder Than War ranked it fifth in their list of the 200 best albums of 2012.

== Track listing ==
OGEN025CD

1. "White"
2. "The Doors of Then"
3. "A Case For Vinyl"
4. "The Graduate"
5. "Hours"
6. "Tobacco Fields"
7. "Anytime Minutes"
8. "The Great Outdoors Bitches"
9. "The Economy"
10. "A Gain"
