= Telling Stories (book) =

2012 book by Tim Burgess

- Hardcover version
- Author: Tim Burgess
- Language: English
- Subject: The Charlatans
- Genre: Autobiography, music
- Publisher: Viking Press
- Publication date: 26 April 2012
- Publication place: United Kingdom
- Media type: Print
- Pages: 240 (hardcover); 256 (paperback)
- ISBN: 978-0670921294
- OCLC: 840071903

Telling Stories is a 2012 autobiography by Tim Burgess, about his time fronting British rock band the Charlatans. After a false start with a ghostwriter, Burgess began the book in earnest in late 2010, completing it in early 2012. Originally released as a hardcover edition, a paperback iteration with an extra chapter was printed in 2013. The book received mainly positive reviews from music publications, several of which commented on Burgess' writing style.

== Background and writing ==
Since the 1980s, Tim Burgess has been the frontman for British rock band the Charlatans, and since the 2000s, released solo material. In 2008, Burgess had been approached about writing an autobiography by an agent of some mutual friends. He spent the following two years mulling over the idea, before finally deciding to do it. Though Burgess' agent proposed writing it alone, he was offered a ghostwriter. In early 2010, he attempted to start with friend and former publicist Robin Turner. Despite the pair thinking it would be a fruitful partnership, the match-up did not work and they both lost interest in the idea. After a period of procrastination, Burgess sought advice from people such as author Mick Middles, deputy prime minister John Prescott and journalist John Robb. Prescott told him to focus on "research", Burgess understood this to make sure specific pieces of information, such as dates and chart positions, were accurate.

The Charlatans released their 11th studio album Who We Touch in September 2010; after touring concluded in December 2010, Burgess visited Wales for a break with his girlfriend. Here, she suggested he should begin work on the book – she would interview him, which would be recorded through his phone. They accumulated around 20 hours of audio, which he then transcribed. The pair visited Monnow Valley Studio in Monmouth, where the Charlatans previously recorded and to the location where the band's former keyboardist Rob Collins had been killed. After realising that he had the skeleton outline of a book, he continued working on it almost daily until January 2012. He commented that he would have been unable to write a book in the years prior, as he was occupied partying and consuming drugs and it would not "have been a good idea to write a book high on cocaine". Writing the book coincided with the making of his second solo album Oh No I Love You (2012): "the book covered the past and the solo album covered the present. I had to do them at the same time because it would have killed me to just look at the past".

== Content and publication ==
Telling Stories is named after the band's similarly named fifth studio album Tellin' Stories (1997). It starts with Burgess experimenting with drugs during his adolescent years, leading into occasions when he would frequent band gigs and club nights at The Haçienda in Manchester. He then talked about joining the Charlatans as their frontman and the early success they had with their first two singles, "Indian Rope" (1990) and "The Only One I Know" (1990). It goes into detail on the rest of the band's history through the Madchester and Britpop movements in the 1990s.

Later in the book, Burgess discusses moving to Los Angeles, California, quitting drugs and studying Transcendental Meditation. Telling Stories was announced in January 2012, and was first printed as a hardback edition on 26 April 2012 by Viking Press. The release of the book was promoted with a short tour where the band played that album in its entirety. A paperback iteration followed in July 2013 by Penguin Books. This edition included an extra chapter on Burgess' musical roots, highlighting the Clash, the Doors, Bob Dylan and New Order among others.

== Reception ==
The Times' Will Hodgkinson wrote that the "clear, honest style of Telling Stories reads like an advertisement for clean living, though it took 20 years of dirty living to build up the material". The Independent reviewer Fiona Sturges added to this, noting that Burgess "doesn't shy away from confessions that cast him in a bad light", highlighting a drunken encounter with Madonna. Margaret Chrystall of What's On North considered it a "rock odyssey that shares juicy details, funny stories and a lifetime of passionate music nerdery before dodging the darkness and docking in a surprisingly good place".

God Is in the TV writer Mike Furber said Burgess writing the book solely gave it a "slightly off-kilter rhythm which, at its best, reminded me of the disorientating, folksy style" of Chronicles: Volume One (2004) by Dylan and "at its worst became a series of pedestrian lists". Spectrum Culture's David Mansdorf disliked this approach, stating a co-writer would have likely aided Burgess form "his story in a way that shows him in a better light". Fiona Shepherd of Scotland on Sunday said it was "diverting in places without really creating much of a lasting impression". While she considered it to be "generally upbeat and conversational so the occasional tangents placing The Charlatans in the wider musical context of the times read like ghost-written interventions".

== See also ==
- Tim Book Two: Vinyl Adventures from Istanbul to San Francisco – Burgess' second book
- Twisting My Melon: The Autobiography – autobiography by Shaun Ryder about contemporaries Happy Mondays
