= Tim Burgess (musician) =

British singer (born 1967)

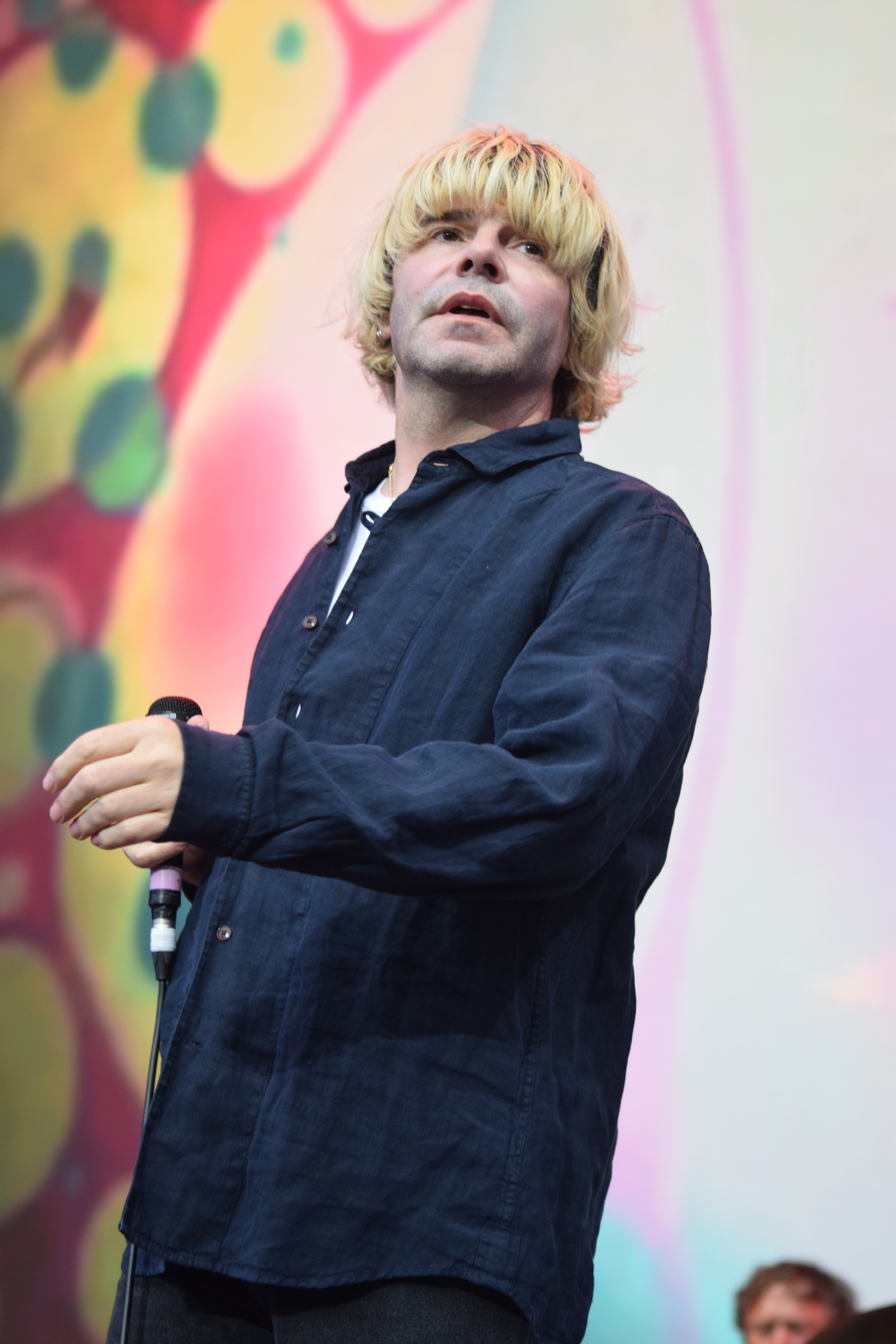
- Burgess performing in 2024

Background information
- Born: Timothy Allan Burgess; 30 May 1967 (age 59); Worsley, Lancashire, England
- Origin: Northwich, Cheshire, England
- Genres: Alternative rock; indie rock; Madchester; Britpop
- Occupations: Singer; songwriter
- Years active: 1989–present
- Labels: Dead Dead Good; Beggars Banquet; Universal; Sanctuary; Cooking Vinyl; PIAS; O Genesis; Bella Union
- Website: timburgessmusic.com

Timothy Allan Burgess (born 30 May 1967) is an English musician, best known as the lead singer of the alternative rock band the Charlatans.

== Early life ==
Burgess was born in Worsley, Lancashire, but grew up in Moulton, Cheshire, where he moved when he was five. He went to Leftwich High School.

He left school at sixteen, and worked for the ICI overseas distribution department at Runcorn.

== Career ==
=== The Charlatans ===
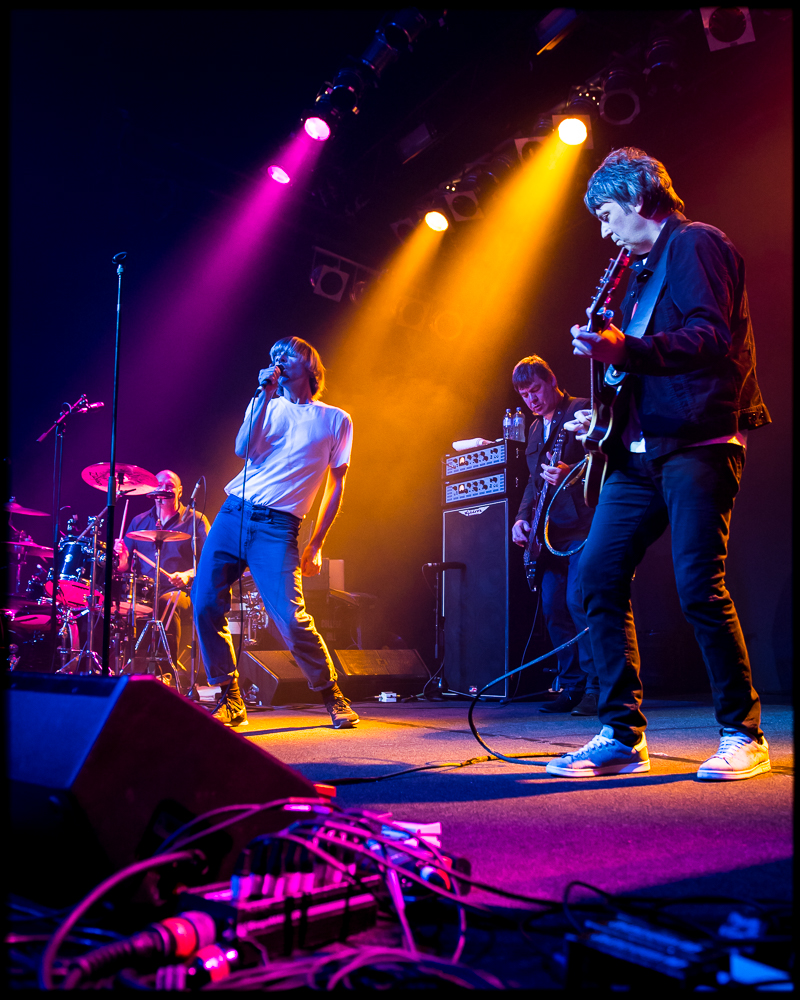
The Charlatans live at The Powerstation, Auckland, New Zealand, 2018

Burgess was initially the lead singer in The Electric Crayons (named after the psychedelic compilation album The Electric Crayon Set, released on the Bam-Caruso record label), who released one single, "Hip Shake Junkie".

Burgess then joined the Charlatans, who were largely influenced by acid house, 1960s-era West Coast psychedelia and the Syd Barrett era of Pink Floyd. The Charlatans' debut single "Indian Rope" was successful, and the group subsequently signed to Situation Two, an offshoot of the Beggars Banquet label. In 1990 they released the single "The Only One I Know" on the imprint, which charted in the top 10 of the UK Singles Chart. The band have released thirteen studio albums to date.

Before the release of the 2004 Charlatans album Up at the Lake, Burgess was living in Los Angeles in the US, away from the other band members who were still based in England. He explained the band's process during that period in a 2012 interview:

"I'm back in London now, but Mark and Tony enjoyed trips out to Los Angeles and we used Los Angeles as a writing tool. I loved the idea of incorporating a city into your music. We used LA quite a lot."

=== Solo ===
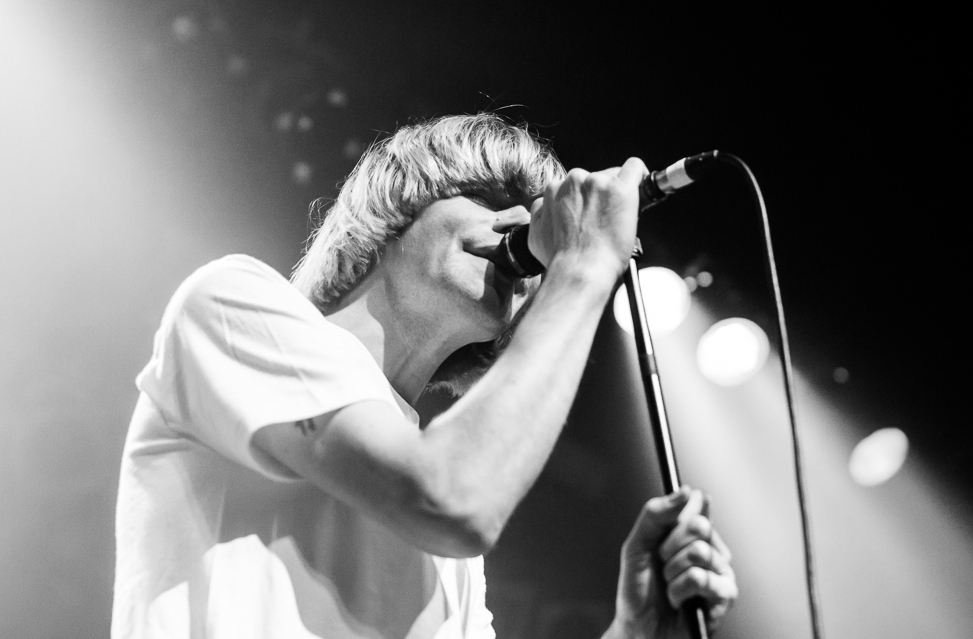
Tim Burgess live at The Powerstation, Auckland, New Zealand, 2018

Burgess's debut solo album, I Believe, was released in Europe on 3 September 2003 and included the track "Oh My Corazon".

Burgess's second solo album Oh No I Love You was produced by Mark Nevers and recorded at his home in Nashville, Tennessee. In 2012, Burgess explained the origin of this album:

"The root of this album goes right back to a Kurt Wagner show in Manchester. I carried Kurt's guitar to the car for him. I took the chance to ask him if he would ever consider writing a song with me. He said, "Sure Tim, you write the music and I'll write the words." That one song turned into an album and almost ten years after we first talked about it, the album is ready."

Oh No I Love You also features collaborations with Factory Floor, R. Stevie Moore and My Morning Jacket, amongst others. The album was later nominated for the Artrocker 'Album of the Year' award in 2012.

=== Collaborations ===
Burgess contributed vocals to Saint Etienne's 1993 song "I Was Born on Christmas Day", which appeared on the "Xmas 93" CD single.

Burgess has twice contributed vocals to tracks by the Chemical Brothers: 1995's "Life Is Sweet", taken from their debut album Exit Planet Dust; and 2005's "The Boxer", from their Push the Button album.

Burgess is a member of the Chavs, together with Carl Barât (the Libertines) and Jamie Reynolds (the Klaxons). In mid-2008, Burgess stated that the band planned to record their debut album in August of that year; however, as of July 2015, an album has yet to emerge. Burgess explained in a 2010 interview:

"I think The Chavs have definitely got this mythical thing going on. They have existed and will exist again."

Burgess remixed the Robots in Disguise song "The Tears", which was released in 2008.

In 2009, Burgess curated the Big Top stage at the Isle of Wight Festival, with a line-up that included Killing Joke and the Horrors. Burgess later explained his reason for selecting The Horrors:

"I really believed in them from the very first time I met them. It was at the time when their first album was released."

Burgess contributed vocals to the song "You Don't Know This About Me" by Freebass, the group featuring New Order ex-member Peter Hook and Gary "Mani" Mounfield of the Stone Roses. The song was released in 2010 as part of the band's debut EP Two Worlds Collide.

During his time in Los Angeles, Burgess collaborated with Joaquin Phoenix on an album that Phoenix was recording at the time; however, in a 2012 interview, Burgess explained that he had not heard from Phoenix since his return to the UK:

"I've not seen him for ages... I don't live in Los Angeles anymore. The time that we spent together was a really great moment. A really great couple of months for me really. He invited me into the recording studio to work on a record and we had a really great time. All relationships with people in bands or actors I've met along the way, you meet them, you're best friends for a minute and you just don't see them at all. If you just remember them as being really great friends and in a way they are. Even if you don't see someone, it's kind of better, 'cos you never get a chance to fall out!"

On 15 November 2012, Burgess performed at Manchester Cathedral as part of a "supergroup" featuring Mark Collins of the Charlatans, Martin Duffy of Primal Scream, and New Order's Peter Hook. The performance was part of a concert organised to help the city's "deprived youth."

Burgess collaborated with Asia Argento on the song "Hours / Ours", which was released on Burgess's own record label O Genesis in 2014.

Burgess collaborated with Peter Gordon to release Same Language, Different Worlds on 2 September 2017 through Burgess' own label, O Genesis. The Charlatans frontman originally met New Yorker Peter Gordon in 2012 and they decided then on a music collaboration. Burgess had been a longtime fan of Gordon's work with Arthur Russell and The Love of Life Orchestra. The album was produced by Gordon in New York and features many of his and Tim's previous collaborators: Ernie Brooks who played with Arthur Russell on the first Modern Lovers album, trombone player Peter Zummo, conga player Mustafa Ahmed and Nik Void from Factory Floor.

=== O Genesis ===
O Genesis is Burgess's own record label, founded in 2011. A compilation CD showcasing the label's artists was released on 10 March 2014, featuring Burgess as a solo artist alongside artists such as Minny Pops, Hatcham Social, R. Stevie Moore and Joseph Coward.

=== Other work ===
In February 2013, Burgess replaced BBC Radio 6 Music host Lauren Laverne when she and other National Union of Journalists (NUJ) members engaged in strike action against the BBC.

In 2019, Burgess made his acting debut in the short film The Bookshop as the protagonist Leonard.

In March 2020, when the COVID-19 pandemic resulted in most live music concerts being cancelled, Burgess started "Tim's Twitter Listening Party", where he would tweet whilst listening to an album with one or more guests, normally a member of the band, who would provide insights and anecdotes about the songs, recording the album or other associated items. Over 700 parties were held in the first year. On 31 August 2023, Burgess announced on his X (formerly Twitter) account that there would be no more additions of "Tim's Twitter Listening Party" but it would continue as a radio and podcast format.

On 20 March 2023, it was announced that Burgess would present Tim's Listening Party, a six-part radio and podcast series based on Tim's Twitter Listening Party, which would air on Sunday nights on Absolute Radio. The first series began on 26 March 2023 followed by a second series on 23 July 2023, which will have eight episodes. A third series began airing on 29 October 2023. A fourth series began on 14 April 2024. A fifth series began on 10 November 2024.

Since 17 May 2026, Burgess has hosted a Sunday evening (6pm-8pm) show on Virgin Radio UK.

== Personal life ==
Burgess' autobiography Telling Stories was published in 2012 by Viking Press. Following the release of the book, Burgess responded to a question about whether he would have changed anything about his career:

No, because I would have had to re-write it again! Everything that happened happened because we made a decision at a point in time and at certain ages. I had a relationship with drugs for quite a long time. I'm glad it's over but at the same time I don't regret it. I must have enjoyed it because I did it for so long. It's the same with the relationship with other people. They lasted as long as they did because they were mostly quite good.

In 2012, Burgess told The Daily Telegraph why he practises Transcendental Meditation:

At the minimum it de-stresses you. You get thoughts — it's not psychedelic—but things pop into your brain. John Lennon used to stop and write his ideas down; I choose not to. I'm enjoying myself so much I don't want to stop.

In March 2014, during a BBC Radio 6 interview with Roddy Frame, it was revealed that Burgess is a fan of the music of both Frame and Edwyn Collins and that he invited the pair to play at his Tim Peaks Café at the Kendal Calling music festival in 2013. Frame stated during the interview that Burgess is "so positive" and both will occasionally drink tea together.

Burgess lived in the US for twelve years before returning to the UK in 2013; he currently lives in London. In the 1990s, Burgess married a woman named Michelle; they divorced in 2012. From his former partner Nik Void, Burgess has a son, Morgan (born 2013). He is a fan of Manchester United F.C.

== Discography ==
Studio albums

- I Believe (2003)
- Oh No I Love You (2012)
- Same Language, Different Worlds (with Peter Gordon) (2016)
- As I Was Now (2018)
- I Love the New Sky (2020)
- Typical Music (2022)

EPs

- Ascent of the Ascended EP (2020)

== Bibliography ==
- Telling Stories (2013) Penguin Books ISBN 9780670921294
- Tim Book Two: Vinyl Adventures from Istanbul to San Francisco (2016) Faber and Faber ISBN 9780571314737
- One, Two, Another (2019) Constable ISBN 9781472130310
- The Listening Party: Artists, Bands and Fans Reflect on 100 Favourite Albums (2021) Dorling Kindersley Ltd ISBN 9780241514894
- The Listening Party Volume 2: Artists, Bands and Fans Reflect on 100 Favourite Albums (2022) Dorling Kindersley Ltd ISBN 9780241586563

== Filmography ==
- The Bookshop (2019) - Leonard
