= Between 10th and 11th =

Studio album by the Charlatans
- Released: 23 March 1992
- Studios: Rockfield, Rockfield, Wales; Strongroom, London
- Genres: Madchester; experimental
- Length: 43:41
- Label: Situation Two
- Producers: Flood; Hugh Jones

The Charlatans chronology
Some Friendly (1990)	Between 10th and 11th (1992)	Up to Our Hips (1994)

Singles from Between 10th and 11th
- 1. "Weirdo" Released: 24 February 1992; 2. "Tremelo Song" Released: 6 July 1992

Between 10th and 11th is the second studio album by British rock band The Charlatans; it was released on 23 March 1992 through Situation Two, a subsidiary of Beggars Banquet Records. The Charlatans started writing new material shortly after the release of their debut studio album Some Friendly (1990). After some writing sessions in Birmingham and a tour of the United Kingdom, guitarist John Baker left the band and was replaced with Mark Collins of English indie band Candlestick Park. Bassist Martin Blunt went through a series of personal issues that led to his hospitalization in September 1991. The Charlatans began recording their next album at Rockfield Studios in Rockfield, Monmouthshire, Wales.

Following two weeks of work, producer Flood was brought in to produce the sessions. Flood encouraged the band to focus on live performances instead of recording one instrument at a time. Between 10th and 11th is a Madchester album whose lyrics deal with introspection and self-doubt, and were influenced by the works of E. E. Cummings and Bob Dylan. The Charlatans' lead singer Tim Burgess attributed some of the album's electronic textures to time he spent in New York City; some of the more-sparse song arrangements recall the work of Talk Talk.

The album's lead single "Weirdo" was released in February 1992 and was promoted with two shows in Glasgow. In April that year, The Charlatans embarked on a tour of the United States with Catherine Wheel and The Wolfgang Press, and a tour of mainland Europe the next month. They then went on a two-month US tour, which was cut short due to the birth of Blunt's child. In the middle of the tour, in July 1992, the album's second single "Tremelo Song" was released, and was promoted with a performance at Reading Festival and a tour of Japan in September the same year.

Between 10th and 11th received unfavourable reviews from music critics, many of whom criticized the band, especially Burgess, for being lazy. Burgess' lyrics and the album's artwork also drew negative comments. Retrospective reviews of the album were more favourable, and some called it an underrated release. The album peaked at number 21 in the UK and number 173 on the US Billboard 200. "Weirdo" charted at number 19 in the UK, number 22 in Ireland and number 67 in the Netherlands, while "Tremelo Song" charted at number 44 in the UK.

== Background and Baker's departure ==
The Charlatans released their debut studio album Some Friendly in October 1990, and promoted it with a tour of the UK and mainland Europe with support from Intastella until the end of the year. During this tour, the band debuted a new song "Can't Even Be Bothered" and between shows, they wrote new songs as a potential follow-up single. While demoing material, Beggars Banquet Records asked them to write a song that resembled their hit single "The Only One I Know". In February 1991, the band embarked on their first US tour, coinciding with the US release of "Sproston Green". The band members were surprised when "Sproston Green" started gaining traction in the US, causing them to worry the tour would be extended and delay recording sessions. While trying to gain popularity in the US, the Charlatans returned to the UK, marking the end of the band and the Madchester scene.

Because Beggars Banquet wanted another single from the band for the UK market, the Extended Play (EP) Over Rising, which David M. Allen produced, was released on 25 February 1991. The EP's music showed the band partly moving from the baggy sound of their previous work into psychedelia. A month after the end of their US tour, the band toured Australia and New Zealand, and played three shows in Japan. This brief tour was a culture shock for the band, who wanted to return to the UK as soon as possible. The band had previously struggled to write new material while on tour, causing issues when they started writing shortly after the Japanese dates. Writing sessions were held at Rich Bitch studios in Birmingham while the band were under pressure to deliver new material; they wanted their new album to be more electronic and experimental than their previous work.

Guitarist John Baker felt insecure about the proceedings, realizing he was playing a reworking of the songs on Some Friendly. Baker found live performances joyless; between tours, he consumed alcohol and drugs. In June 1991, the Charlatans toured the UK tour with support from Catherine Wheel, Johnny Male, Soul Family Sensation and New Fast Automatic Daffodils; during this tour, Baker considered leaving the band. Following their performance in London, the band met with producer Scott Litt, who is known for his work with R.E.M., aiming to have Litt produce their next album. Unbeknown to Baker, keyboardist Rob Collins told the other members he felt Baker was holding them back. Collins and bassist Martin Blunt later told Baker they wanted him to leave, and Baker agreed. At the end of June, Baker performed his last shows with the band at Roskilde Festival in Denmark and Belfort Festival in France.

== Collins' arrival and writing ==
With Baker's departure, shows in the rest of mainland Europe were cancelled and plans to release a new album were postponed from September 1991 to early 1992. Harrison said the band wanted to find someone who would contribute more to the writing; Baker is credited with only five of the songs on Some Friendly. Harrison contacted Alison Martin, the band's former press agent, who was now working for radio promotion company Red Alert, about the situation. Martin discussed this with Inspiral Carpets manager Anthony Bogianno, who suggested his band's roadie Noel Gallagher and their former van driver Mark Collins, who was now playing in his own band Candlestick Park. Collins lurked near the offices of Red Alert in his spare time. Martin later put Collins in contact with The Charlatans, who he knew had been looking for another guitarist. While this was occurring, The Charlatans had auditioned the guitarist from the Honey Turtles. Blunt liked what he heard but upon leaving the room to smoke a cigarette, Rob Collins complained about the guitarist's height. Lead singer Tim Burgess had previously seen Mark Collins with his previous band The Waltones and decided to invite him to audition for the Charlatans. Collins arrived at the rehearsal and was asked to join the band.

Some associated told the Charlatans they should make a bigger departure from baggy and try not to alienate their existing fan base. Blunt felt Collins' initial writing contributions strayed from his vision of the band's future sound but coincided with what the other members' intentions. By this point, the band had finished 18 songs for their next album, which had the potential of being a double album. Manager Steve Harrison noted Blunt was undergoing personal issues, such as not easily accepting Baker's departure and loathing making the song "Me. In Time", wishing they had instead recorded "Weirdo". The other members were happy to consider Collins' writing ideas and outvoting Blunt on his objections. Blunt was aware of the critical backlash against Some Friendly, which their label was still asking the band to promote. Alongside this, Blunt's relationship with his wife was deteriorating; as a result, Blunt developed paranoia and by September 1991, he had collapsed and was hospitalized.

Blunt was diagnosed with clinical depression and told to rest for a fortnight. During this time, the Madchester and baggy scenes had fallen out of popularity, and Nirvana had released Nevermind (1991), allowing for the success of grunge acts such as Alice in Chains, Pearl Jam and Soundgarden. The Charlatans' contemporaries also faced problems; The Stone Roses were involved in a legal battle with their label and Happy Mondays experienced negative attention from press outlets. The Charlatans had a self-imposed policy about releasing no more than one single from an album, which meant they released additional songs on the EP Over Rising and the forthcoming single "Me. In Time". They had only four unrecorded pre-Collins songs; "Weirdo", "Tremelo Song", "Can't Even Be Bothered" and "(No One) Not Even the Rain".

== Recording ==
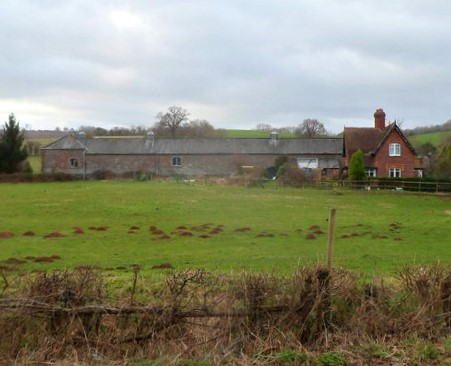
Rockfield Studios in Rockfield, Monmouthshire, Wales, where the Charlatans recorded Between 10th and 11th.

The Charlatans travelled to Rockfield, Monmouthshire, Wales, to record at Rockfield Studios. Hugh Jones produced "Me. In Time", which was released as a non-album single in October 1991. The song reached number 28 on the UK Singles Chart; the band deemed this a failure because a re-release of their debut single "Indian Rope" reached the top 60 without any promotion. After working for two weeks at Rockfield, the band decided to bring in a producer; they were unsure who they wanted to work with, so Beggars Banquet sent them various CVs. The band found the Rich Bitch studio sessions to be fruitless so they wanted to work with someone who could encapsulate the band's spirit. Chris Nagle, who had produced Some Friendly, was occupied with Inspiral Carpets and thus unavailable. Someone at the band's music publisher Warner Chappell Music suggested Flood, who had worked with Nine Inch Nails and Pop Will Eat Itself. Flood was eventually selected after Burgess showed the rest of the band Movement (1981) by New Order and This Is the Day...This Is the Hour...This Is This! (1989) by Pop Will Eat Itself.

Flood had remixed "Sproston Green" for the US market and the EP Over Rising. When the band contacted Flood, he had finished working on Achtung Baby (1991) by U2. The members of The Charlatans were unaware he worked with U2; they were more familiar with his work with Depeche Mode and the Wolfgang Press. Flood agreed to work with the band after learning that his girlfriend enjoyed Some Friendly. After arriving at Rockfield, Flood scrapped all of the material The Charlatans had already recorded, leaving only six weeks to record and mix an album's worth of songs. Paul Cobbold served as engineer; he and Flood were assisted by Daren Galer, Goetz Botenhart and Philip Ault. Flood's method of working saw the band perform live together, break recording into portions, and construct songs with different rhythm parts and effects while keeping intact the melodies. Nagle would have the band record to a click track, recording one instrument at a time over several weeks. Flood preferred working intensely in short bursts of productivity; at one point, the band had completed eleven backing tracks in eight days.

The band members were not used to this approach, feeling it took an intensive toil on them. Members would argue among themselves, requiring Flood to break stalemates and ensure work continued. He helped the band learn how to use studio technology; while recording in "Weirdo", he showed the band how to use sequencers in a live setting. Rob Collins had brought a sampler into the studio, which he used to compose parts and melody lines for "Tremelo Song", "The End of Everything" and "Weirdo". Jones is credited as original recording producer on "Subtitle", which had previously been released as one of the B-sides to "Me. In Time"; Flood remixed the song for inclusion on the new album. Because Burgess was late composing lyrics for "(No One) Not Even the Rain", he recorded his vocals for the track at Strongroom in London. Burgess later said all of the band had an "ego problem", and that none of them wanted to be in the same room. He said collaborating with someone like Flood "really didn't work. We didn't have the songs for it, and he didn't tell us when he was supposed to be the producer". Despite this, Blunt became close with Flood and asked if he would produce the band's subsequent work.

== Composition and lyrics ==
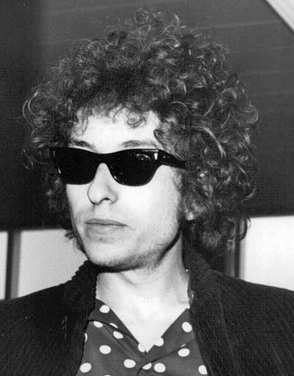
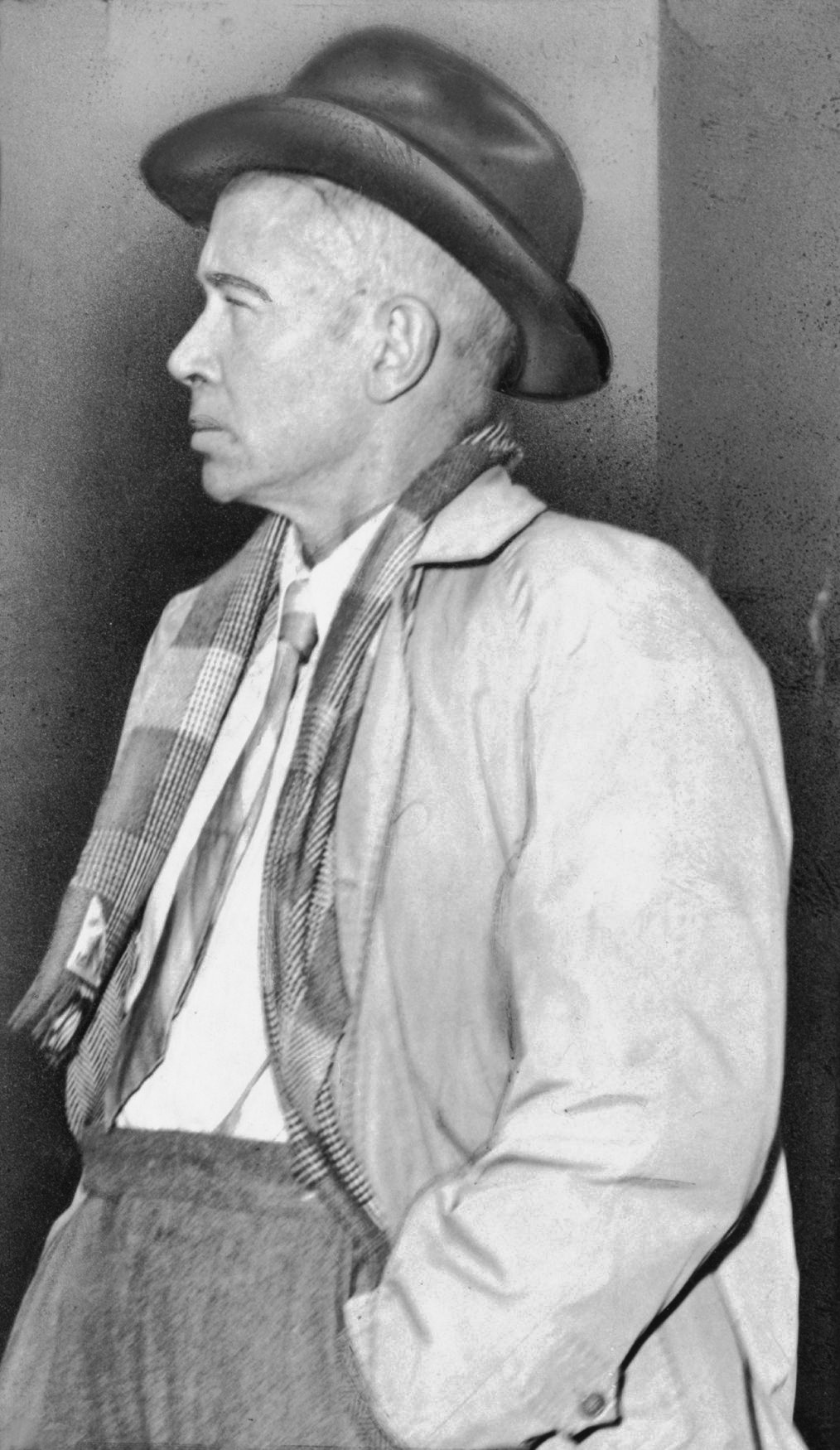
Bob Dylan (left) and E. E. Cummings (right) inspired the themes of introspection and self-doubt heard on Between 10th and 11th.

=== Themes and music ===
Discussing the album's lyrical theme, Burgess said it was "weird. It was like 'Please get me out of this place.'" Topics such as introspection and self-doubt can be found throughout the songs, which are influenced by the works of E. E. Cummings and Bob Dylan. Author Dominic Wills in The Charlatans: The Authorised History (1999) said Burgess admired Cummings' "abrasive belligerence and the abandon of his uninhibited Bohemianism". PopMatters' John Bergstrom said drummer Jon Brookes toned down the "jaunty shuffle rhythm that permeated every track on the debut" in favour of a "more subtle yet evocative" playing style. Burgess felt time he spent in New York City influenced the album's song titles and electronic textures; he attributed the electronic elements to Flood's work on Achtung Baby and Depeche Mode's Violator (1990), the latter giving Between 10th and 11th a sense of darkness. While making the album, Burgess listened to Dylan's music, and was enthralled with his albums Bringing It All Back Home (1965), Highway 61 Revisited (1965) and Blonde on Blonde (1966). Despite the influx of inspiration, during this time, Burgess found songwriting difficult; Blunt criticized Burgess' lyrics and Burgess later attributed this to the state of Blunt's mental health.

The album's title Between 10th and 11th alludes to Marquis Theatre in New York City, where the band played their first show in the US. The title had earlier been given to a song they performed for a session for BBC Radio 1 presenter John Peel in early 1991 that was later scrapped. Prefabs and Riches and Anticlockwise had been suggested as working titles, and the latter title was used on some promotional copies of the album. Burgess said Anticlockwise was considered "too negative"; he felt a reference to New York in the album's final title would be appropriate because he was spending his free time between East Village, Manhattan; Chiswick, London; and his parents' home in Moulton, Northamptonshire.

The album's sound has been described as Madchester and experimental. Journalist John Robb in his biography of the band The Charlatans: We Are Rock (1998), said: "on one level there is a rasping rawness and a great drum sound, on the other some of the song arrangements sound a tad empty", bordering on the sound of Talk Talk. Wills said Flood was "true to his word in retaining the band's ... melodic flourishes. But the beat was clearly at the front of his mind, and the industrial idiosyncrasies that had made his name" could be found, such as the sound of Collins dropping his guitar amplifier. Robb said Collins' guitarwork throughout the album sounds like him "warming up. ... His guitar, when it cuts in, is razer-sharp like taut wire. A rasping and great sound, devilish licks lash across the tracks". Though Baker claimed to have worked on three songs from the album, including "Weirdo" and "(No One) Not Even the Rain", he is not credited on any of the tracks. The other six tracks are credited to the new line-up; Blunt–Brookes–Burgess–Mark Collins–Rob Collins. Two of these songs had been finished before Mark Collins' arrived; Mark Collins added only supplemental guitar parts but helped compose of the other four, having been in the band for only two months at that point.

=== Tracks ===
"I Don't Want to See the Sights", the opening track of Between 10th and 11th, includes brushes interacting with piano strings. This was overdubbed with strings that were being picked and altered by reverse reverb. "Ignition" was originally called "Anticlockwise", referring to things that were out of the band's control going wrong. "Page One" was originally named "Vulture" after its opening lyric; its rhythmic sound is reminiscent of the work of New Order. For "Page One", Collins layered acoustic and electric guitars, and used different tunings. Burgess said the song talks about "spoiling someone’s fun" because he was "very [un]happy with how trapped I felt". "Tremelo Song" mixes 1970s disco with 1990s dance, which are accompanied by a reoccurring piano part in the style of "We Love You" (1967) by The Rolling Stones. The song features two different choruses; the band used both choruses because they could not decide which to use. Rob Collins sings the first chorus and Burgess sings the second. The lyrics for the choruses refer to being an independent individual without being controlled by The Man. "The End of Everything" is a war song Burgess based on the song "Love Vigilantes" (1985) by New Order; he said his friend feigned an illness so he could leave the army.

"Subtitle" is the result of Burgess attempting scratch vocals for an idea based on two phrases and writing a fully completed song instead. The guitars, which recall the work of the Who, are accompanied by new-age-style keyboard parts. The guitarwork in "Can't Even Be Bothered", which is enhanced by a tremolo effect, recalls the guitarwork in "Flying" (1967) by the Beatles. Blunt's bass part evokes "Under My Thumb" (1966) by the Rolling Stones. The chorus sections have the most similarity to the songs on Some Friendly. "Weirdo" is an introspective song; Burgess said the title phrase is used as a form of endearment, showing pride in one's status as an outsider. He noted Nevermind is "quite direct" and thought if the Charlatans were just as direct, the song would be "quite suitable to the [musical] surroundings". The song was originally planned to start with guitar, bass and drums but Flood added the Hammond outro section to the beginning. Discussing the title of "Chewing Gum Weekend", Blunt said there are two reasons for gum-chewing: "you're trying to pack in smoking or you're trying to stop yourself grinding your own teeth to dust". One of the lines in "(No One) Not Even the Rain" is directly taken from the final line of Cummings' poem Somewhere I Have Never Traveled. The outro portion alludes to the material on Throbbing Gristle's 1979 album 20 Jazz Funk Greats.

== Release ==
=== "Weirdo" single and album promotion ===
"Weirdo" was released as the lead single from Between 10th and 11th on 28 February 1992, with the instrumental "Theme From 'The Wish'", an alternative version of "Weirdo" and Flood's remix of "Sproston Green" as the B-sides. The song's music video, which was filmed in London, depicts the Charlatans, a Dalmatian dog and a dancer sitting on a couch. The band's US label RCA Records flew the band to Los Angeles, California, to consecutively record videos for "I Don't Want to See the Sights" and "Weirdo" with Samuel Bayer, who had directed the video for Nirvana's "Smells Like Teen Spirit" (1991). The video for "I Don't Want to See the Sights", which was recorded in a psychiatric hospital, features a man spinning in a wheelchair. The band played two shows in Glasgow at King Tut's Wah Wah Hut on 29 February and 1 March 1992 as a warm-up for Mark Collins and to test the new songs in a live setting.

Between 10th and 11th was released on 23 March 1992 through Beggars Banquet imprint Situation Two; its artwork features a photograph of bananas taken by Steve Majors. Little time had been afforded for the artwork; the final image was chosen from a variety of other photographs. Burgess said the bananas looked Andy Warhol-esque, though Wills said it was not an intentional homage to The Velvet Underground & Nico (1967) by the Velvet Underground. The band promoted the album with two shows in Greece before starting a tour of the UK with support from Milltown Brothers. During the tour, two Hammond organs belonging to Rob Collins malfunctioned and a fight broke out after one of the shows, resulting in Collins leaving the venue and threatening to quit the band. With the album's sales declining, Beggars Banquet wanted another single from the album, which annoyed the band. The label also asked the band to embrace formatting—the releasing of singles with multiple sleeves and different accompanying songs—an act the band considered a form of fan exploitation that countered their working-class principals.

=== US tours, "Tremelo Song" single and later promotion ===
By this point, Some Friendly had sold 350,000 copies in the US and the Charlatans were deciding the best way to promote the new album there. They thought with the right amount of exposure, they could tour as a headlining act in that market, an idea Beggars Banquet resisted. The president of RCA Records proposed the band could co-headline a six-week US tour with Peter Murphy, allowing them to play at 5,000-capacity venues instead of 2,000-capacity ones. Harrison called Peter Murphy a "goth and fucking crap", and the rest of the band were uncomfortable with the suggestion. This answer annoyed RCA Records, who unlike the band and Harrison, who preferred perseverance, wanted to plan everything in the advance. In the past, Beggars Banquet would help to smooth over situations like this but RCA stopped returning the band's calls and redirected them to different offices in the company.

The Charlatans embarked on a US tour in April 1992, starting with an appearance at Edgefest in Dallas, Texas. They were supported by Catherine Wheel and the Wolfgang Press. While some of the shows were bigger than those on their earlier US tour, reception of the album seem muted. Upon returning to the UK, they noticed although album sales were falling, their live crowds were growing larger. The following month, they embarked on a month-long tour of mainland Europe. From June that year, the band went on an expansive tour of the US but following the birth of Blunt's child and a negative back-stage interaction with Madonna, the band chose to return early to the UK in August 1992. Mark Collins said they had to choose between "another 20,000 sales or keeping your sanity. We chose sanity".

At the same time, Beggars Banquet felt another single was essential and planned formatting options, angering the band who, due to constant touring, had little to offer their fans in terms of new B-sides. "Tremelo Song" was released as a single on 6 July 1992, and was accompanied by "Happen to Die", a demo titled "Normality Swing", and live versions of "Then" and "Chewing Gum Weekend" as B-sides. The music video for "Tremelo Song" has an arthouse aesthetic; it features actor Spencer Leigh walking into the sea and then entering a pub, where he finds the band drinking. Burgess said they tried to "make sure it was always something new, not just dodgy live versions". Harrison was more sympathetic to the label, saying: "Eventually, though, you do have to consider the record company's needs, and one of their main needs is to compete in the market-place". Later in August 1992, the Charlatans sub-headlined Reading Festival and went on a short tour of Japan the following month.

=== Reissues, related releases and events ===
In 2008, Beggars Banquet Records wanted to issue expansive box sets of Some Friendly and Between 10th and 11th but plans stalled with the band's management. In 2020, Between 10th and 11th was reissued as a two-CD set that was packaged with the live album Isolation 21.2.91 Live at Chicago Metro, which was originally released in 1991, but without any contemporaneous B-sides or alternative mixes. The Charlatans' Reading Festival appearance was released as Live at Reading Festival :: 1992 in 2022.

In early 2023, the Charlatans toured the US with Ride and played the entirety of Between 10th and 11th. The two acts had played shows together as early as 1993. Burgess said the Charlatans were asked to play either Some Friendly or Between 10th and 11th, choosing the latter for its connection with American audiences and because they had played little material from it, except "Weirdo", in the intervening years.

"Weirdo" was included on the band's first, third and fifth compilation albums Melting Pot (1998), Forever: The Singles (2006) and A Head Full of Ideas (2021), respectively. As part of the 2019 Record Store Day event, "Weirdo" and "Tremelo Song" were released as part of the seven-inch vinyl box set Everything Changed (2019).

== Reception ==
Original release
Review scores
Source	Rating
Chicago Tribune	2.5/4 stars
Entertainment Weekly	A−
NME	8/10
Pittsburgh Post-Gazette	B+
Rolling Stone	3/5 stars
Select	2/5
Smash Hits	2/5

=== Contemporaneous reviews ===
Wills said music critics lambasted Between 10th and 11th upon its release but it received a reappraisal in later years. Many reviewers said The Charlatans had employed Flood in the same manner U2 did: "to make themselves look like avant garde risk takers, and to disguise the fact that they had come up with no melodies". Flood avoided disdain while the band were criticized, especially Burgess, for being lazy. His lyrics and the album cover were also berated.

Melody Maker writer Steve Sutherland said Between 10th and 11th is too "ill-focused and lacking in any sort of energy", and criticized Burgess' lyric-writing as "freely associative bilge". Pittsburgh Post-Gazette writer Scott Mervis said the album shows the band could "stretch out" their sound but told listeners not to focus on the lyrics. According to Select writer Adam Higginbotham, the album continues the problems of the band's earlier album, saying: "[Burgess] was making everything up as he went along, murmuring away over a groovy backdrop in the hope of stumbling across a vocal line". Bill Wyman of Entertainment Weekly called the lyrics "blather" but complimented the band's "swirling rhythms and distinctive instrumentation".

The Blade's Doug Iverson noted the band offer "a bit more of a growl" on Between 10th and 11th, giving "more intriguing results" than the previous album. The staff at NME said while it is not "stuffed with great singles", Between 10th and 11th shows a band "stretch[ing] out and mak[ing] some great interesting music", which was something that should be praised "in the gaping post-baggy vacuum". Mark Caro of Chicago Tribune noted Mark Collins' guitar parts were "pushed to the forefront and the density and urgency somewhat dissipated" as a result. Rolling Stone reviewer Rob O'Connor said the album "works on a subtler level" because the "mix is more densely layered". Higginbotham said "[d]espite a new sound" and Flood's production, the "fundamental problem lingers".

=== Retrospective reviews ===
Retrospective reviews
Review scores
Source	Rating
AllMusic	4/5 stars
Alternative Rock	7/10
The Encyclopedia of Popular Music	2/5 stars
The New Rolling Stone Album Guide	3/5 stars
Under the Radar	8.5/10 stars
PopMatters	8/10

Critic John Harris regarded Between 10th and 11th as a "very underrated album" but criticized the "pretty crap" packaging and artwork choice, negatively comparing it to the works of Northside. Wills called the album an "intriguing collection, disappointing in its lack of cheap thrills but impressive, especially rhythmically, in its struggle to rise above the norm". According to Robb, The Charlatans were trying "too hard to break away from their pop roots and prove themselves as a band with 'depth'". Punk Planet writer Julie Gerstein said the album was "by and large overlooked" upon its release due to the changing musical landscape. She referred to the fact The Charlatans made an album as "lush" as Between 10th and 11th "without the use of samplers is remarkable and makes them something of an anomaly of the period". Author Dave Thompson, in his book Alternative Rock (2000), wrote the band "spin this album out of the subtlest of melodies, hanging on to the slightest of hooks", praising the interplay of the guitar and keyboard parts. AllMusic reviewer Ned Raggett said the album is "much stronger than its reputation" that precedes it, and that Flood's production is "strengthening and creating excellent arrangements for everyone as a whole".

Bergstrom found Between 10th and 11th to be a "surprisingly calm, introspective, almost mournful album", even though what the band were mourning seems to be vague. He called it a "quantum leap in musical maturity and sophistication" from their debut, and highlighted Flood's "crisp, clean sound". The staff at The New Rolling Stone Album Guide said although the album lacks memorable moments and does not have a "hook in sight", it is far superior to Some Friendly. Describing the album in 2021, Burgess said it was "pretty extreme for some people. We completely dismantled everything that we had, we changed a band member, and Rob felt that he’d done everything, really, on the first album." According to Ian King of Under the Radar, Flood's production is a "significant part of what distinguishes this record in The Charlatans’ discography". When reviewing the 2020 reissue, Bergstrom said the inclusion of the live show adds "no historical context" because it contains no songs from Between 10th and 11th.

=== Commercial performance ===
Between 10th and 11th entered the midweek UK Albums Chart at number four, appearing at number 21 on the main album chart. According to Robb, the album's lack of commercial success was likely due to a "backlash amongst record buyers who were growing tired of what they perceived as the Manchester [and baggy] thing than the band not delivering" something of quality. A week after the final date of their April 1992 US tour, the album peaked at number 173 on the US Billboard 200 chart, and in the Netherlands it reached number 73. By February 1994, the album had sold 92,000 copies in the US. "Weirdo" charted at number 19 in the UK, number 22 in Ireland and number 67 in the Netherlands. "Tremelo Song" charted at number 44 in the UK.

== Track listing ==
All songs written by Martin Blunt, Jon Brookes, Tim Burgess, Mark Collins and Rob Collins, except where noted.

No.	Title	Writer(s)	Length
1.	"I Don't Want to See the Sights"		4:53
2.	"Ignition"		3:03
3.	"Page One"		4:12
4.	"Tremelo Song"	Blunt; Brookes; Burgess; R. Collins	4:38
5.	"The End of Everything"		5:49
6.	"Subtitle"		4:12
7.	"Can't Even Be Bothered"	Blunt; Brookes; Burgess; R. Collins	3:40
8.	"Weirdo"	Blunt; Brookes; Burgess; R. Collins	3:38
9.	"Chewing Gum Weekend"		5:05
10.	"(No One) Not Even the Rain"	Blunt; Brookes; Burgess; R. Collins	4:24

== Personnel ==
Personnel per booklet.

The Charlatans

- Martin Blunt – bass
- Jon Brookes – drums
- Tim Burgess – vocals
- Mark Collins – guitar
- Rob Collins – keyboards

Production and design

- Flood – producer, mixing
- Paul Cobbold – engineer
- Darren Galer – assistant
- Goetz Botenhardt – assistant
- Philip Ault – assistant
- Hugh Jones – original recording producer (track 6)
- Kim Peters – art direction
- Steve Majors – front cover photography
- Steve Double – group photography

== Charts ==
Chart performance for Between 10th and 11th
Chart (1992)	Peak position
Dutch Albums (Album Top 100)	73
UK Albums (Official Charts)	21
US Billboard 200	173

== See also ==
- Yes Please!
