= Some Friendly =

Studio album by the Charlatans
- Released: 8 October 1990
- Recorded: March – August 1990
- Studios: Strawberry, Stockport; The Windings, Wrexham, Wales
- Genres: Acid-pop; baggy; dance-pop
- Length: 47:54
- Label: Situation Two
- Producer: Chris Nagle

The Charlatans chronology
Some Friendly (1990)	Between 10th and 11th (1992)

Singles from Some Friendly
- 1. "The Only One I Know" Released: 14 May 1990; 2. "Then" Released: 10 September 1990; 3. "Sproston Green" Released: 4 February 1991

Some Friendly is the debut studio album by British rock band the Charlatans that was released on 8 October 1990 through Beggars Banquet Records imprint Situation Two. After forming in 1988, the band went through line-up changes before settling on vocalist Tim Burgess, guitarist John Baker, bassist Martin Blunt, keyboardist Rob Collins and drummer Jon Brookes. The band wrote material at a prolific rate and released their debut single "Indian Rope" in early 1990. Soon afterwards, they signed to Beggars Banquet and began recording their debut album. Between March and August 1990, sessions took place with producer Chris Nagle at Strawberry Studios in Stockport and The Windings in Wrexham. Some Friendly is considered an acid-pop, baggy and dance-pop album that draws influence from The Beatles' psychedelic period.

In May 1990, "The Only One I Know" was released as the lead single from Some Friendly; it earned the Charlatans their first appearance on the BBC Television music show Top of the Pops and the band embarked on their first headlining tour of the United Kingdom. Following their first overseas show in August 1990, "Then" was released as the album's second single in September 1990. The band played several shows in the United States and were forced to append "UK" to their name because of an identically named American band. The Charlatans ended 1990 with a tour of the UK and mainland Europe with support from Intastella. In early 1991, they went on their first full US tour, coinciding with the release of "Sproston Green" as a single in February 1991.

Some Friendly received mixed reviews from music critics, many of whom noted of the band's influences rather than their sound. Collins' keyboard work was highly praised but Burgess' vocals were negatively received. Retrospective reviews were more favourable, though some still pointed out the influences. The album peaked at number one the UK Albums Chart and the British Phonographic Industry (BPI) certified it gold three days after its release. It also charted in Australia, New Zealand, Sweden and the US. "The Only One I Know" and "Then" both reached the top 20 in the UK and number 11 in Ireland. Both Melody Maker and Sounds included Some Friendly on their lists of the year's best releases, being listed in the top 10 in the former and in the top 30 in the latter. "The Only One I Know" has been viewed as one of the defining tracks of the Madchester and baggy scenes.

== Background ==
After the demise of their band The Gift Horses, bassist Martin Blunt, vocalist and guitarist Baz Ketley, and drummer Jon Brookes regrouped and held a jam session, marking the formation of The Charlatans in 1988. They engaged several keyboardists before finding one who fit the sound they were aiming for. This new keyboardist, however, died after four-to-five rehearsals. Blunt then engaged Rob Collins, who had played in a band with Brookes when they were teenagers. The band recorded two sets of demo recordings and began looking for a manager. Steve Harrison, owner of a record shop called Omega Music, had been interested in managing bands. Blunt, who he knew from his time in Makin' Time, contacted Harrison to see his band perform. After the set, Harrison was impressed and agreed to manage the band. The Charlatans' first attention from national music publications came in August 1988 when they supported Broken English at Walsall Overstrand; the Charlatans' set received a lukewarm reception.

Harrison took his friend Tim Burgess of The Electric Crayons to see the Charlatans; Burgess enjoyed the performance but thought they could sound better with a different singer. The Electric Crayons supported the Charlatans for one show in September 1988. Collins had tried to convince Blunt to draft Burgess into the band; Blunt instead invited him to do backing vocals for their set. The Charlatans supported various American bands and later the Stone Roses at several shows as that act were rising in popularity. Brookes said the band were impressed with the confidence the Stone Roses' frontman Ian Brown had, wishing they had a vocalist like him. Ketley left the Charlatans after his girlfriend left him, though Harrison said the decision came from Ketley, who felt the band were heading nowhere. By June 1989, the Charlatans were looking for a replacement vocalist and guitarist.

Blunt had earlier asked guitarist John Baker of Liquid Egg Box, who had booked the Charlatans at Walsall Overstrand, to practice with them but Baker had declined. When Blunt asked Baker again in July 1989, Baker suggested another guitarist, who appeared for a few rehearsals and left thereafter; Baker joined The Charlatans shortly afterwards. The band auditioned a number of other people before considering Burgess, whose band had now broken up. Blunt went to ask Harrison if he could persuade Burgess to join them; Harrison plastered a "vocalist required" sign on the window of Omega Music that caught Burgess's attention. Burgess was unaware Ketley had left the Charlatans and went to the audition in Walsall. Burgess's audition was initially unsuccessful because he was emulating Iggy Pop. After an attempt at performing naturally, Burgess became the band's new vocalist by August 1989. Burgess and Baker did not like the material the band had accumulated up to that point; Burgess found no emotional connection to the lyrics and Baker being unable to play the guitar parts.

== Writing and label signing ==
All of the members of the Charlatans were tired of their jobs; they practised as often as they could and wrote new songs at a prolific rate. The first song the new line-up wrote together was "Flowers"; they played their first show together at the end of August 1989. While Brookes was on holiday in Ibiza, the rest of the band wrote "Indian Rope", "The Only One I Know" and "Sproston Green" in a single weekend. The Charlatans were unable to secure a recording contract so Harrison decided to form his own label, which he called Dead Dead Good. Harrison signed the Charlatans to a contract for one album and three singles; they made a gentlemen's agreement in which the band could join another label should they receive an adequate offer. They made a demo tape comprising "Indian Rope", "You Can Talk to Me" and "White Shirt", selling copies at gigs in October 1989. Around this time, the Madchester and baggy scenes had risen to prominence with acts such as the Stone Roses and Happy Mondays after the release of "Fools Gold" and the Madchester Rave On EP, respectively.

In December 1989, the band played a show at The Boardwalk in Manchester supporting Cactus World News. The majority of the audience left after the Charlatans finished their set, which was attended by Chris Nagle, an engineer for Factory Records and assistant to Factory producer Martin Hannett. Towards the end of the month, Nagle contacted Harrison, who sent him a tape of a gig that included "Indian Rope" and "Sproston Green". Nagle later attended a rehearsal and another show. Press coverage followed soon after and the members quit their jobs to focus on the band full-time. In January 1990, the band recorded a demo tape consisting of "Polar Bear", "Sonic", "The Only One I Know" and "White Shirt". Harrison packaged copies of the tape with press kits, one of which came into the possession of Manchester Evening News writer Sarah Campion. Campion passed the tape to Alison Martin, with whom she ran the press agency Scam. Martin liked the tape and had a meeting with Harrison. She left the meeting as the band's radio plugger and press agent.

Nagle produced the Charlatans' debut single "Indian Rope", which was released in January 1990. It peaked at number one on the UK Independent Singles Chart; the band sold all of the copies they had within a week, prompting Harrison to put his house up for payment so he could press more copies. The band promoted the single with their first headlining UK tour, commencing January 1990. During the tour the band received requests for radio interviews, including one from Key 103, Manchester's biggest station. While touring, the band discussed what to release as their next single; the band chose "Polar Bear" but Martin thought "The Only One I Know" was superior, as did other people, and told the band. A&R staff from several labels, such as Island, Phonogram, PolyGram and Sire Records, attempted to sign the band. A number of their contemporaries, including Intastella, the Mock Turtles and Paris Angels, were signed in quick succession. Following a performance in London, the Charlatans met with representatives of Beggars Banquet Records, with whom they signed a six-album deal. According to Dominic Wills in The Charlatans: The Authorised History (1999), the band had at least two reasons for the signing; Beggars Banquet were upfront about their deals with Omega Music and they were able to promote a band into the mainstream with the Cult. Harrison stipulated the Dead Dead Good logo would appear on the band's next few releases.

== Recording ==
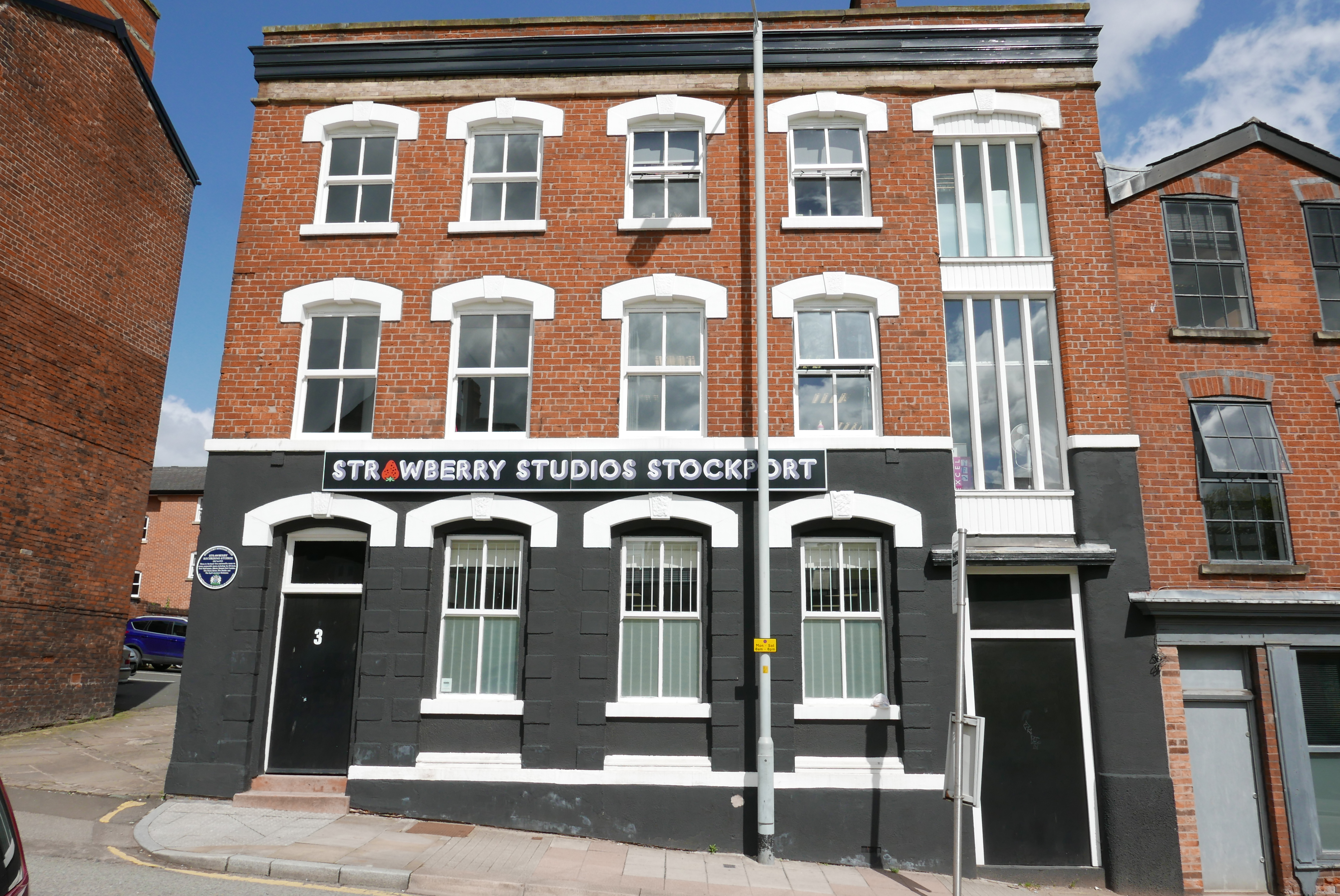
Strawberry Studios in Stockport, where "The Only One I Know" was recorded with Chris Nagle

Shortly after signing their contract, the Charlatans were also considering "Flowers" for their second single. When the band went to record "Polar Bear", a friend said they were recording the wrong song, alluding to "The Only One I Know". In the studio, the band found a fax from Beggars Banquet's A&R man Roger Trust asking them to record "The Only One I Know". The song and its later-accompanying B-sides were recorded in one week in March 1990 at Strawberry Studios, Stockport. The band chose Nagle as their producer for his modern approach to recording, which balanced the band's 1960s-esque sound. Burgess had wanted to record his vocals as quickly as possible, but Nagle encouraged him to sing more.

The remainder of Some Friendly was recorded in three sessions in five weeks in mid-1990 between live performances. These sessions were held—again with Nagle producing—at The Windings near Wrexham. The studio had been a storage area for a coal mine from the early 1900s. For "Flower" and one other song, Nagle recorded Burgess' vocals in the studio's garden. The band's main problem was a lack of quality material to record, having been together for only a short period. Burgess said they would previously record songs soon after writing them, only allowing them to evolve through subsequent live performances. Burgess did not think the band left The Windings "on very friendly terms" after experiencing "studio bust-ups between the owners and the group". Blunt and Collins were accused of smashing equipment, of which Harrison had no recollection.

Recording concluded with some B-sides in August 1990 at Strawberry Studios, where Nagle would mix the album. Growing confident as musicians, the band members suggested ways that some of the songs should sound; this included asking for distortion to be added to a particular instrument. Nagle said the band were "paranoid" about The Stone Roses' 1989 self-titled album: "They were trying to copy it, be [better than] it and be completely different from it all at the same time". Burgess later said they were not ready to make an album at the time: "We had some great stuff, but also some stuff that had to go on there just to make up the numbers". As a result, "You're Not Very Well" and "Opportunity" were written late in the sessions. Blunt felt the process was too rushed while Burgess felt there would not have been an album at all if they had not quickly recorded it. Burgess later regretted the version of "Polar Bear" they had recorded, stating; "it was a live favourite but we'd overproduced it and destroyed it in the studio". The band thought the bass was under-produced; Wills agreed, saying "it 'moves' rather than 'drives'" the material forward.

== Composition and lyrics ==
=== Themes and sound ===
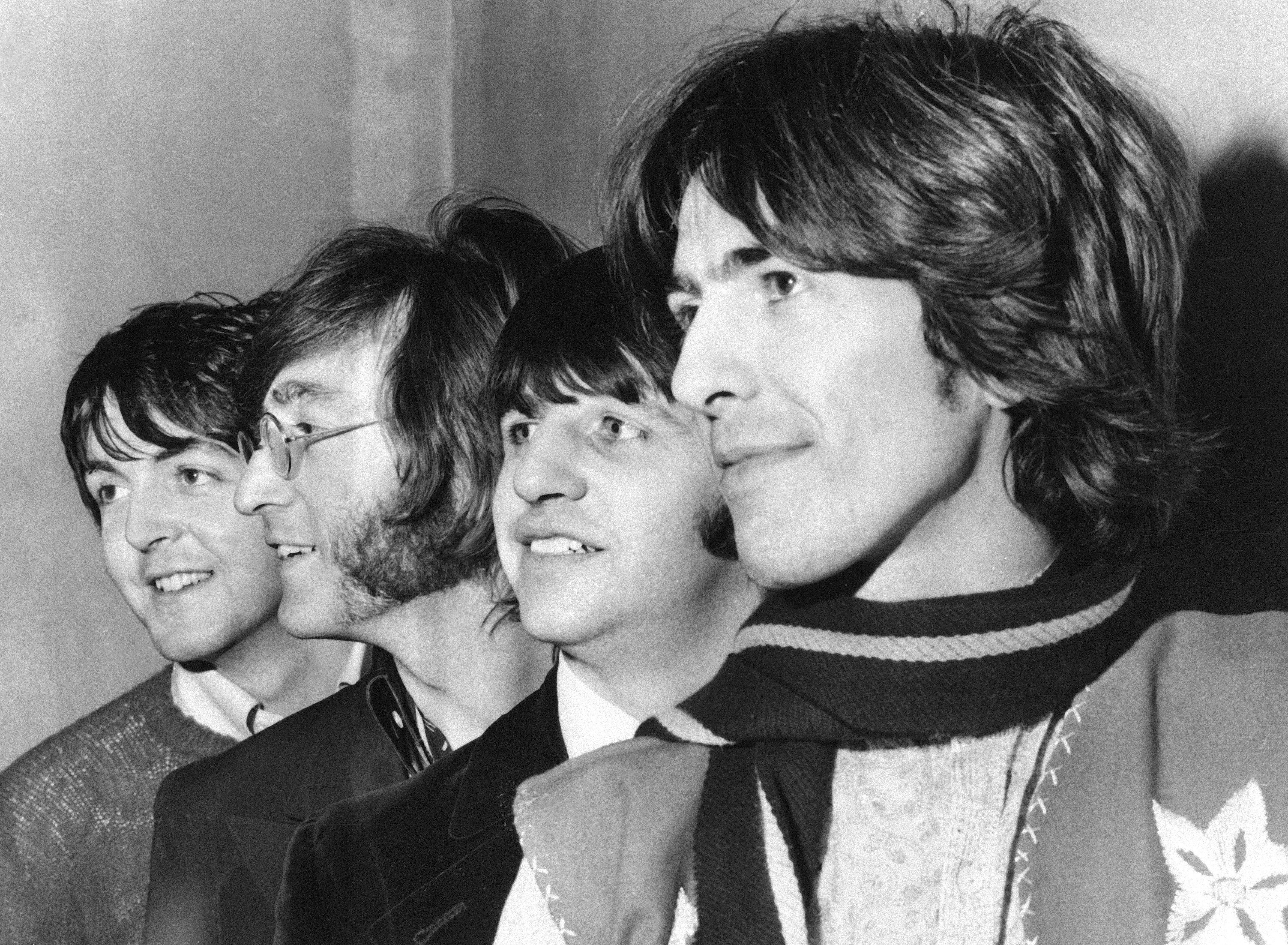
The psychedelic period of the Beatles (pictured in 1968) acted as an important influence on Some Friendly.

Some Friendly has been classified as acid-pop, baggy and dance-pop; Burgess said the Beatles' psychedelic period had a major influence on the album. In his book Pink Floyd FAQ, writer Stuart Shea said the Charlatans and Some Friendly owed a debt to "Echoes" (1971) by Pink Floyd; these influences include the use of found sounds in the songs "109 Pt.2" and "Polar Bear". He also said the "slow, building groves" of "Believe You Me", "Flower" and "Sproston Green", all of which "overflow with creamy Hammond organ, psychedelic guitar effects, aggressive bass, and winsome vocals, owe as much to 'Echoes' as to any other influence". Author Michael Heatley said the Charlatans had more of a "traditional" sound than their contemporaries Happy Mondays and the Stone Roses because of their Rolling Stones-like "swagger" and Collins' organ.

Journalist John Robb in his biography The Charlatans: We Are Rock (1998), refers to Some Friendly as the band's "Hammond album", adding, "the record was stamped with Collins' brooding complex personality and just beyond the record's poppy vibe you can hear the great crashing keyboard played with an intense passion by a young man working out his inner turmoil through rock & roll". Jon Wiederhorn of Spin said the band's music "float[s] on gently lapping waves of sound, blending light, iridescent instrumentation and heavy-lidded vocals with loose hypnotic dance beats". According to Burgess, a number of Brookes' drum patterns were likely influenced by club music, specifically songs they would hear at Manchester club The Haçienda. He said the album is representative of some of the members' home town Northwich "because all the songs, lyrically especially, came from my childhood and that was based all around Northwich".

=== Tracks ===
Some Friendly's opening track, "You're Not Very Well", is about leaving home and moving to a big city; Burgess moved from Northwich to the Isle of Dogs in London. The song was originally named "Some Friendly"; Burgess said he gave their early songs "mood titles" to give them a sense of mystery. They changed the song's name because they felt it worked better as an album title. Burgess described its new title of "You're Not Very Well" as being a love letter to city life, specifically visiting Manchester, where he felt like an outsider. "White Shirt" is largely inspired by the work of Felt and an attempt to shift Collins' musical interests away from The Beatles and Deep Purple. Burgess cites Sonic Flower Groove (1987) by Primal Scream and Armstrong’s Revenge & Eleven Other Short Stories (1985) by the Claim as influences, and said its title refers to a dress code for one town's clubs during his youth. The song's bassline recalls the one in "She Bangs the Drums" (1989) by the Stone Roses. In an interview, Burgess said he had taken the chord progression from Felt's "Ballad of the Band" (1986).

"The Only One I Know" began as an instrumental; Burgess said he was buying cigarettes when he thought of the melody that became the song. He rushed home to get his dictaphone before he forgot it. The lyrics discuss teenage emotions. Burgess said the song has an abnormal structure and that he was unsure which part is the chorus section. The title came from "You're Not the Only One I Know" (1990) by the Sundays and the song's hook is found in the verse sections. Blunt said Baker recorded repetitive guitar parts that are similar to those in "You Keep Me Hangin' On" by the Supremes to give the song a "bit more urgency". Following the second chorus, every instrument except the bass is removed, a technique the band learnt from music on Stax Records. The song was compared to the work of the Spencer Davis Group and Deep Purple—specifically their version of the 1967 song "Hush"—while one line of the chorus was directly taken from "Everybody's Been Burned" (1967) by the Byrds.

The title of "Opportunity", which was originally "Love Senses Chaos", was taken from "Opportunities (Let's Make Lots of Money)" (1986) by Pet Shop Boys. "Opportunity"'s first half was inspired by Burgess's experience in London following a band rehearsal. He was travelling on the London Underground and found himself walking amidst the poll tax riots. He observed broken windows, mounted police and looting and became "overawed by the violence". Partway through, Burgess sings of hating his own body. The music was influenced by "Life's What You Make It" (1985) by Talk Talk. When talking about "Then", Burgess said Collins' strength on an organ was equivalent to guitar solos by John Squire of the Stone Roses. Burgess said the song discusses his friends settling down while he wanted to find meaning in his life. The song's drum beat was inspired by one Brookes heard in Three Feet High and Rising (1989) by De La Soul. "109 Pt.2" evolved from "Imperial 109", a song with which the Charlatans used to open their earlier Ketley led-era live shows. The title is taken from a book about flying boats. This newer version was inspired by the work of Throbbing Gristle, and includes a sample of Robert De Niro from Angel Heart (1987).

"Polar Bear" was initially titled "Looking for the Orange One", a line from the song. Burgess realised that "oblique lyrics—which might seem incongruous—can end up being quite memorable". The song's intro has woodwind played by Pete "Peewee" Coleman and the outro alludes to "Hey Bulldog" (1969) by The Beatles. Burgess said "Believe You Me", which was originally called "Who Killed Your Lover", is about being a Gemini. In "Flower", which has a Pixies-esque bass part, Burgess wishes death upon a person from his youth. Its lyrics evolved from a note Blunt had passed to Burgess that read "Don't bring me flowers, I am not dead", and is anchored around the phrase "Time to say goodbye bye to the bad bad girl". Burgess wrote the lyrics for "Sonic" while working in an office at the Runcorn branch of Imperial Chemical Industries (ICI). Part of the lyrics discuss Burgess wanting to live in a painting while another part talks about a girl who disappears after consuming drugs. Its title is a reference to Sonic Boom of Spacemen 3 and the Sonics. The closing song, "Sproston Green", is a jam centred around Collins' keyboard work. The name is borrowed from a lane in Sproston, Cheshire. The song's intro was altered to the point it evoked "Won't Get Fooled Again" (1971) by the Who rather than its drawn-out live performances. Blunt borrowed the bassline from a Midlands hard-rock band he had seen in a pub. Burgess said it follows a repetitive, three-chord build-up in the style of Spacemen 3. The lyrics are about a liaison in a local park.

== Release ==
=== "The Only One I Know" and "Then" singles, and initial promotion ===
In April and May 1990, the Charlatans toured the UK, performing at 1,000-capacity venues. The Beggars Banquet's imprint Situation Two released "The Only One I Know" as Some Friendly's lead single on 14 May that year. The single includes "Everything Changed", "You Can Talk to Me" and an edit of "Imperial 109" as its B-sides. Harrison's friend Kim Peters, who was a graphic designer with no prior experience of filming videos, directed the music video for "The Only One I Know". The video depicts the band replicating a live show, and was recorded in Sandbach at a warehouse owned by a friend of Harrison. It was recorded in the evening with an audience comprising friends and fans. Police officers, having been informed that an illegal rave was happening at the venue, arrived but recording continued after brief negotiations. Some of the police officers appear in the completed video. The band played a session for BBC Radio 1 presenter Mark Goodier to promote the single, performing "You're Not Very Well", "White Shirt" and "The Only One I Know", as well as making their debut appearance on the BBC Television music programme Top of the Pops.

The Charlatans continued touring through to June 1990; Madchester's popularity continued to rise as the Stone Roses reached their zenith with a performance at Spike Island and Happy Mondays' performance at Glastonbury Festival. In August 1990, the Charlatans played at Hultsfred Festival in Sweden, marking their first show abroad. "Then" was released as the album's second single on 10 September 1990, with "Taurus Moaner", an instrumental version of "Taurus Moaner" and an alternative take of "Then" making up the release. The choice of song for the single caused tension within the band, some of whom wanted to release "Polar Bear". Blunt, however, did not, citing overproduction on the song and threatening to quit if it was chosen. The band felt uncomfortable releasing a second single from the album; according to Wills: "Assuming that 'The Only One I Know' was to be on the album, this would make two singles from the same record, which they still regarded as ripping-off the fans". As a compromise, "The Only One I Know" was later removed from the vinyl edition of the album, which they saw as "the real" iteration of Some Friendly. It was included on the CD versions at the label's request because CDs had become the dominant medium for consuming music.

A music video for "Then" was filmed partially in a cave, with Peters directing. Collins became ill on the day of filming so a friend mimed in his place. Other parts of the video show the band performing on a hillside in Shropshire that is partly obscured by smoke. The band promoted "Then" with a gig at Legends, a venue in Warrington. During this time, the UK press noted a decline in the popularity of the Madchester scene. Burgess and Brookes went on a promotional press trip in the United States; the band then played several shows there in October 1990. The Charlatans were forced to append UK to their name for this tour because the name was already being used by an American band. The US tour included a performance at the Gathering of the Tribes, where the band played a 40-minute set despite only being scheduled to play for 20 minutes. On one occasion during the tour, the band members failed to leave their beds for a cover story with Rolling Stone, upsetting the band's US label RCA Records.

=== Album release, "Sproston Green" single and further touring ===
Some Friendly was released in the UK on 8 October 1990 through Situation Two; the vinyl version was packaged in a white plastic sleeve. It was issued in the US through RCA on 23 October 1990. The cover artwork includes an out-of-focus photograph of the band, chosen over a photograph of wax models of the members. The Charlatans ended 1990 with a tour of the UK and mainland Europe with support from Intastella, who were offered the tour when their manager played Burgess a tape of their music. In February and March 1991, the Charlatans embarked on their first full tour of the US; because the Stone Roses were unwilling to tour North America, the Charlatans became the most-popular baggy band there. A side effect of this was the Stone Roses being compared to the Charlatans rather than vice versa. "Sproston Green" was issued as a single in that market on 4 February 1991, the release featuring the album version and a remix version as well as an extended remix of "Opportunity". A French release includes 7" and 12" edits of "Sproston Green" and "You're Not Very Well", and a remix of "Opportunity" by Flood titled "Opportunity Three". Peters filmed a music video for "Sproston Green" consisting of live footage from the Apollo in Manchester.

Plans to record a video for "White Shirt" with director Julien Temple were ultimately scrapped. Beggars Banquet was still interested in releasing another UK single from the album. The band gave the label three new songs and a previously released remix. The "Over Rising" EP was released on 25 February 1991. It includes "Over Rising", "Happen to Die", "Way Up There" and the "Opportunity Three" remix. The remix had been available as a promotional club-only release, but when it started gaining national airplay, people mistook it for a single. Because there was demand for the remix, it was included on the EP. To the surprise of the band, "Sproston Green" started gaining traction in the US, which made them worry that the tour would be extended and thus delay future recording sessions. They asked RCA to withdraw the single, which again angered the label. Harrison said this request "compromised us in just about every territory on the planet". Alongside this, Burgess had insulted American culture. The band returned to the UK to recover from the tour. This retreat marked the end of both the band and the Madchester scene attempting to gain market share in the US, leaving an opportunity for grebo acts such as EMF and Jesus Jones to do so later that year.

=== Reissues, related releases and events ===
In June 2009, Burgess said he wanted to play a one-off gig to celebrate the 20th anniversary of Some Friendly, though mentioned that not all of the members of the Charlatans were interested in the idea. In May 2010, Beggars Banquet Records reissued Some Friendly to mark the anniversary. The reissue includes a bonus disc of B-sides and BBC sessions. This version surfaced after a failed attempt by Beggars Banquet to compile a more expansive box stalled with the band's management two years earlier. Coinciding with this, the band performed the album in its entirety in London, Glasgow, Blackpool and at Primavera Sound in Barcelona, Spain. The three UK performances were recorded and released as live albums through the service Concert Live immediately after the end of the shows.

In 2019, Some Friendly was re-pressed on vinyl with the addition of "The Only One I Know" in the US market for that year's Record Store Day. The January 1990 demo of "The Only One I Know" was re-released in 2020, coinciding with its 30th anniversary. "The Only One I Know", "Then", the US remix of "Sproston Green" and "Opportunity Three" were included on the band's first compilation album Melting Pot (1998). "The Only One I Know" was also included on the band's third and fifth compilation albums, Forever: The Singles (2006) and A Head Full of Ideas (2021). The deluxe vinyl box set version of A Head Full of Ideas also includes demos of "White Shirt" and "The Only One I Know". As part of the 2019 Record Store Day event, "The Only One I Know" and "Then" were released as part of the seven-inch vinyl box set Everything Changed (2019).

== Critical reception ==
Original release
Review scores
Source	Rating
Entertainment Weekly	B+
New Straits Times	2.5/5 stars
NME	8/10
Select	2/5
Sounds	4.5/5 stars
The Village Voice	C

=== Contemporary reviews ===
Upon its release, Some Friendly was met with mixed reviews from music critics, a number of whom highlighted the band's influences rather than the contemporary nature of their sound. Collins' keyboard parts were lauded, but Burgess' vocals received negative comments.

Wiederhorn said that unlike the Stone Roses, the Charlatans have their "feet firmly planted on the ground". He called the album "lush and warm, teeming with spinning rhythms and soothing melodies". R.S. Murthi of New Straits Times said the songs are "palatable but scarcely poignant" while the lyrics "border on the bathetic". Entertainment Weekly writer Elysa Gardner said the band successfully "capture the moodiness of a lot of late-'60s rock and, on their better cuts ... the shimmering buoyancy of that era’s pop".

In his review for Select, journalist Andrew Harrison called the album "doggedly authentic, if inconsistent". He highlighted "109 Pt.2" as an example of the band's "infatuation with a shagged-out rock past that's been done over several times too many already". Elizabeth Wurtzel of New York said the album is "like falling into a time warp", singling out the use of the organ and wah-wah guitar effects as "so quintessentially sixties that it resembles music from the soundtrack of a very dated movie". Despite this, she found it added to the band's charm because they appeared "so unpretentious".

The staff at Q said that the band were being weighed down by allusions to the work of the Stone Roses, but chose "Polar Bear" and "Sproston Green" as the album's "twin peaks" that showed that the band "posses enough wit, style and personality to transcend mere nostalgia and produce something vigorous and exciting". Terry Staunton of NME countered, saying that any influence that the Stone Roses had is non-existent on Some Friendly. The Sounds staff agreed, adding it "buried any preconceptions about the band being also-rans on the Manchester playing field". They praised every song for being a "positive gem", concluding by calling the album one of the "finest and most challenging records of the past two years".

Retrospective reviews
Review scores
Source	Rating
AllMusic	3.5/5 stars
Alternative Rock	8/10
The Encyclopedia of Popular Music	4/5 stars
MusicHound Rock	4/5 stars
The New Rolling Stone Album Guide	2/5 stars
Record Collector	4/5 stars

=== Retrospective reviews ===
Reviewing the 2010 reissue, Iain Moffat said that Some Friendly provides the "best evidence that, whether anyone realised it at the time or not, the Charlatans were thoroughly versed in being enduring, and endearing, from the off". He added that few of the bonus tracks are "wholly essential from anything other than a historical viewpoint". According to Record Collector's Ian Shirley, the debut is "an awesome first album establishing the band as their own men". Robb wrote that despite the album being a "great attempt to capture the flavour of the times", it is not "quite the classic that, say, the Roses had dealt the year before". Author Dave Thompson, in his book Alternative Rock (2000), wrote that what makes the band stand apart from their contemporaries is their "occasional nod to Mod (especially the Who); that and Tim Burgess' wistful, delicate vocals."

AllMusic reviewer Ned Raggett said that Some Friendly offers "everything from '60s beat groove to Madchester bagginess with verve". Wills said that its production history lends the album a sense of charm: "its evident desire to make something of itself, the way it loses momentum then claws its way back into the groove. Though some of it, in retrospect, is a little thin-sounding and overly twee", adding that Burgess's interest in 1960s psychedelia got the "better of him". Ian Gittins of The Guardian said that upon revisiting Some Friendly, "you realise how much of the album was unadventurous filler". The staff of The New Rolling Stone Album Guide said that the album's "derivative ode to dippy, Hammond-happy psych-pop didn't help" to stop comparisons between the Charlatans, Happy Mondays and the Stone Roses.

== Commercial performance and legacy ==
Some Friendly entered the UK Albums Chart at number one, marking the first time in a few years a new act had debuted at that position. It was certified silver and gold in the UK by the British Phonographic Industry (BPI) on the same day, three days after the album's release. It reached number 27 in Sweden, number 48 in New Zealand, number 73 in the US and number 79 in Australia. By the release of the band's second studio album Between 10th and 11th in early 1992, Some Friendly had sold 350,000 copies in the US.

"The Only One I Know" topped the UK Independent Singles Chart and reached number nine on the main UK Singles Chart. It also charted at number 11 in Ireland and number 56 in the Netherlands. In the US, it reached number five on the Mainstream Rock Songs chart. The song was certified silver in the UK by the BPI in 2019. "Then" charted at number at number 11 in Ireland and number 12 in the UK.

Melody Maker ranked Some Friendly sixth on their list of the best releases from 1990 while Sounds included it on their list at number 25. James Forryan for HMV and Richard Luck in his book The Madchester Scene (2002) regarded "The Only One I Know" as one of the defining songs from the Madchester scene, which Heatley also selected for his list of key songs from the period. Lois Wilson of Record Collector noted both it and the album as key baggy releases. Andy Bell of Ride had learnt the Charlatans had a song called "Polar Bear"; he liked the name and used it for a song of Ride's own on their debut album Nowhere (1990). "Sproston Green" has been used as a closing number for the majority of the Charlatans' live shows, through to 2022.

Accolades for Some Friendly
Publication	List	Rank	Ref.
Melody Maker	Albums of the Year	6	
Sounds	Albums of the Year	25	

== Track listing ==
Writing credits per booklet.

1990 CD edition
No.	Title	Writer(s)	Length
1.	"You're Not Very Well"	John Baker; Martin Blunt; Jon Brookes; Tim Burgess; Rob Collins	3:31
2.	"White Shirt"	Blunt; Burgess; Collins	3:25
3.	"The Only One I Know" (not on all vinyl versions)	Baker; Blunt; Brookes; Burgess; Collins	3:58
4.	"Opportunity"	Blunt; Brookes; Burgess	6:41
5.	"Then"	Blunt; Brookes; Burgess; Collins	4:11
6.	"109 Pt.2"	Blunt; Brookes; Burgess; Collins	3:18
7.	"Polar Bear"	Baker; Blunt; Brookes; Burgess; Collins	4:56
8.	"Believe You Me"	Blunt; Brookes; Burgess; Collins	3:41
9.	"Flower"	Baker; Blunt; Burgess; Collins	5:27
10.	"Sonic"	Brookes; Burgess; Collins	3:32
11.	"Sproston Green"	Baker; Blunt; Burgess; Collins	5:08

== Personnel ==
Personnel per deluxe booklet, except where noted.

The Charlatans

- John Baker – guitar
- Martin Blunt – bass
- Jon Brookes – drums
- Tim Burgess – vocals
- Rob Collins – keyboards

Additional musicians

- Pete Coleman – woodwind ("Polar Bear")

Production and design

- Chris Nagle – producer, mixing
- Pete Coleman – engineer
- K10 AD – concept
- Derek Philip – cover photography
- Steve Double – additional photography
- Ian Lawton – additional photography
- Derek Ridgers – additional photography
- Peter Wals – additional photography
- Nick Provan – additional photography

== Charts and certifications ==
=== Weekly charts ===
Chart performance for Some Friendly
Chart (1990–1991)	Peak position
Australian Albums Chart (ARIA)	79
New Zealand Albums Chart (RMNZ)	48
Swedish Albums Chart (Sverigetopplistan)	27
UK Albums (Official Charts)	1
US Billboard 200	73
Chart (2010)	Peak position
Greek Albums (IFPI)	12
Chart (2026)	Peak position
Scottish Albums (Official Charts)	14
UK Independent Albums (Official Charts)	12

=== Certifications ===
Certifications for Some Friendly
Region	Certification	Certified units/sales
United Kingdom (BPI)	Gold	100,000^{^}
^{^} Shipments figures based on certification alone.

== See also ==
- Pills 'n' Thrills and Bellyaches – the 1990 album by Happy Mondays, released a month after Some Friendly
- Spartacus – the 1991 album by contemporaries the Farm, who similarly founded their own label to release their debut

== Bibliography ==
=== Books ===
- Burgess, Tim (2013). Telling Stories. London: Penguin Books. ISBN 978-0-241-97196-3.
- Burgess, Tim (2019). One Two Another: Line by Line – Lyrics from the Charlatans, Solo and Beyond. London: Constable. ISBN 978-1-4721-3031-0.
- Graff, Gary; Durchholz, Daniel, eds. (1999). MusicHound Rock: The Essential Album Guide. Farmington Hills, Michigan: Visible Ink Press. ISBN 1-57859-061-2.
- Heatley, Michael (2007). Rock and Pop: La historia Completa (in Spanish). Ediciones Robinbook. ISBN 978-8496222854. Archived from the original on 29 June 2022.
- Larkin, Colin (2007). The Encyclopedia of Popular Music (5th concise ed.). Omnibus Press. ISBN 978-0-85712-595-8. Archived from the original on 29 June 2022.
- Luck, Richard (2002). The Madchester Scene. Harpenden, Hertfordshire: The Pocket Essentials. ISBN 1-903047-80-3.
- Robb, John (1998). The Charlatans: We Are Rock. London: Ebury Press. ISBN 0-0918-6568-9.
- Shea, Stuart (2009). Pink Floyd FAQ. Milwaukee, Wisconsin: Backbeat Books. ISBN 978-0-87930-950-3.
- Stewart, Allison (2004). "Charlatans U.K.". In Brackett, Nathan; Hoard, Christian (eds.). The New Rolling Stone Album Guide (4th ed.). Simon & Schuster. ISBN 0-7432-0169-8.
- Sutherland, James (2003). "The Charlatans". In Buckley, Peter (ed.). The Rough Guide to Rock. London: Rough Guides. ISBN 978-1-84353-105-0. Archived from the original on 29 June 2022.
- Thompson, Dave (2000). Alternative Rock. Third Ear: The Essential Listening Companion. San Francisco, California: Miller Freeman Books. ISBN 0-87930-607-6.
- Wills, Dominic; Sheehan, Tom (1999). The Charlatans: The Authorised History. London: Virgin Books. ISBN 0-7535-0194-5.
- Wilson, Susan (1997). The Charlatans – Northwich Country Boys. London: UFO Music. ISBN 0-7535-0494-4.

=== Journals and magazines ===
- Harrison, Andrew (November 1990). "The Only One They Know". Select (5). ISSN 0959-8367.
- Mann, Bill, ed. (12 May 1990). "Advertisement" (PDF). Sounds. ISSN 0144-5774.
- Murthi, R.S. (3 March 1991). "Pleasant blend of folk and pop". New Straits Times. Archived from the original on 27 June 2022.
- Wiederhorn, Jon (January 1991). "Platter du Jour". Spin. 6 (10). ISSN 0886-3032. Archived from the original on 29 June 2022.
- Wurtzel, Elizabeth (12 November 1990). "The Garden of Edie". New York. 23 (44). ISSN 0028-7369. Archived from the original on 28 June 2022.
