= Tremelo Song =

1992 single by the Charlatans

Single by the Charlatans

from the album Between 10th and 11th
- Released: 6 July 1992
- Length: 4:41; 4:09 (alternate take)
- Label: Situation Two; Beggars Banquet
- Songwriters: Martin Blunt; Jon Brookes; Tim Burgess; Mark Collins; Rob Collins
- Producer: Flood

The Charlatans singles chronology
"Weirdo" (1992)	"Tremelo Song" (1992)	"Can't Get Out of Bed" (1994)

"Tremelo Song" was a single released by English rock band the Charlatans in 1992. The song reached number 44 on the UK Singles Chart. The single version was remixed by Mike "Spike" Drake.

== Track listings ==
All live tracks were recorded at the Manchester Apollo on 8 April 1992.

CD1

1. "Tremelo Song" (alternate take) – 4:09
2. "Happen to Die" – 4:58
3. "Normality Swing" (demo) – 2:53

CD2 (The Charlatans Live)

1. "Tremelo Song" – 4:41
2. "Then" – 4:10
3. "Chewing Gum Weekend" – 5:27

12-inch

1. "Tremelo Song" (alternate take)
2. "Happen to Die" (unedited version)
3. "Then"
4. "Chewing Gum Weekend"
