= The Only One I Know =

1990 single by the Charlatans

- UK 12-inch cover artwork

Single by the Charlatans

from the album Some Friendly
- B-side: "Everything Changed"; "Imperial 109"; "You Can Talk to Me"
- Released: 14 May 1990
- Recorded: March 1990
- Studio: The Winding (Wrexham, Wales); Strawberry (Stockport, England)
- Genre: Madchester; baggy
- Length: 4:00
- Label: Situation Two
- Songwriters: John Baker; Martin Blunt; Jon Brookes; Tim Burgess; Rob Collins
- Producer: Chris Nagle

The Charlatans singles chronology
"Indian Rope" (1990)	"The Only One I Know" (1990)	"Then" (1990)

Music video
- "The Only One I Know" on YouTube

"The Only One I Know" is the second single by English rock band the Charlatans. It was their first top-10 hit, reaching No. 9 on the UK Singles Chart. In the UK, it was the highest-charting single from the Some Friendly album. Its best showing in the United States was on the Billboard Modern Rock Chart, reaching No. 5 in September 1990.

== Background ==
The song contained lines directly lifted from the Byrds' 1967 song "Everybody's Been Burned," while the melody prominently features an organ riff lifted from the Deep Purple rendition of the song "Hush". In addition, Martin Blunt has described Jon Baker's guitar part as resembling that of the Supremes' "You Keep Me Hangin' On".

Tim Burgess has described the song as being "about teenage feelings: I like somebody, why do they not like me? I was 21 or 22, but still had those powerful emotions". According to him, the band initially intended to record a different song, "Polar Bear", for release as their second single, but after both a friend of Burgess' and their record label Beggars Banquet Records suggested that "The Only One I Know" would be a better choice they changed plans. Burgess has described the song as having an unusual construction: "I’m still not sure which bit is the chorus. The title and main hook is in the verse, but the intro – before the main song crashes in – gives people just enough time to get on the dancefloor". Blunt has said that the breakdown to his bass part after the second verse was influenced by funk and Stax Records' southern soul sound. After the band recorded the track at The Winding Studios in Wrexham, it underwent further mixing by Chris Nagle at Strawberry Studios in Stockport.

The song was also included as a track on the 1990 compilation album Happy Daze.

== Music video ==
A music video was released for the song and was directed by Kim Peters in her directorial debut, a friend of the band's then-manager Steve Harrison whom previously worked as a graphic designer with no prior experience of filming music videos, and depicts the band performing the song at a warehouse in Sandbach, owned by a friend of Harrison, which was filmed in the evening with an audience of friends and fans. Police officers, having been informed that an illegal rave was allegedly happening at the venue, arrived, and filming resumed after brief negotiations. Some of these officers appear in the final video.

== Track listings ==
All tracks were written by Baker, Blunt, Brookes, Burgess, and Collins, except "Then", written by Blunt, Brookes, Burgess, and Collins.

7-inch single

1. "The Only One I Know" – 3:56
2. "Everything Changed" – 3:21

12-inch single

A1. "The Only One I Know" – 4:00
B1. "Imperial 109" (edit) – 3:44
B2. "Everything Changed" – 3:23

UK CD single

1. "The Only One I Know" – 3:56
2. "Imperial 109" (edit) – 3:41
3. "Everything Changed" – 3:21
4. "You Can Talk to Me" – 4:49
- "You Can Talk to Me" was recorded on 20 March 1990 for the John Peel Show, BBC Radio 1, first broadcast on 9 April 1990. The US CD single switches tracks two and three.

US cassette single

1. "The Only One I Know" (edit) – 3:25
2. "Then" (alternative take) – 5:45

== Charts ==
Chart (1990–1991)	Peak position
Australia (ARIA)	75
Ireland (IRMA)	11
Netherlands (Single Top 100)	56
UK Singles (Official Charts)	9
US Album Rock Tracks (Billboard)	37
US Modern Rock Tracks (Billboard)	5
US Cash Box Top 100	80

== Certifications ==
Region	Certification	Certified units/sales
United Kingdom (BPI)	Gold	400,000^{‡}
^{‡} Sales+streaming figures based on certification alone.

== Release history ==
Region	Date	Format(s)	Label(s)	Ref(s).
United Kingdom	14 May 1990	12-inch vinyl; CD	Situation Two	
United Kingdom	21 May 1990	7-inch vinyl	Situation Two	
Australia	16 July 1990	7-inch vinyl; 12-inch vinyl; cassette	Situation Two; RCA; Beggars Banquet	

== Notable cover versions ==
The song was covered in a funk-infused take by English musician, DJ and producer Mark Ronson for his 2007 studio album of cover versions, Version, featuring vocals by pop superstar and former Take That member Robbie Williams (having previously co-produced Williams' seventh studio album Rudebox the year prior). The Apple Music description of Version dubs Ronson and Williams' rendition as having "transformed a baggy anthem into a Northern soul stomper". This version was also featured on select editions of Williams' 2010 greatest hits album In and Out of Consciousness: Greatest Hits 1990–2010. When Ronson performed the song during his set at the 2007 BBC Electric Proms, after Williams was unavailable, the Charlatans' frontman Tim Burgess stepped in on vocals alongside Mark Collins, the band's guitarist since 1991.
