= Intastella =

English alternative rock band

- Also known as: Laugh
- Origin: Manchester, England
- Genre: Alternative rock
- Years active: 1980–1989 (as Laugh); 1990–1997 (as Intastella)
- Labels: Remorse; Sub Aqua; MCA; Planet-3
- Past members: Martin Wright; Ian Bendelow (Laugh); Martin Mittler; Spencer Birtwistle; Stella Grundy (Intastella); Lil' Anthony (Intastella)

Intastella were an English alternative rock band from Manchester, England, who evolved from the earlier band Laugh. They had four top-75 hits in the UK during the 1990s.

== History ==
Laugh was formed in 1980 by graphic designer Tim Gudgeon and medical student Simon Frampton. They wrote all the songs that the band performed in numerous gigs across Manchester and Liverpool until Frampton had to leave in 1984 to complete his medical training (he was to become a GP in Ormskirk). Auditions to replace his distinctive voice produced the line-up of Martin Wright (vocals, guitar, keyboards), Ian Bendelow (guitar), Martin Mittler (bass guitar), and Spencer Birtwistle (drums, later a member of The Fall). Their debut release was "Take Your Time Yeah!", a flexi-disc included with Debris magazine in December 1985, with three further singles following prior to their only album, Sensation No. 1 (1988). The band had two placings on the UK Independent Chart with "Paul McCartney" (which featured Smiths guitarist Craig Gannon) (#44) and "Time to Lose It" (#19), and recorded two sessions for John Peel's BBC Radio 1 show.

In 1990 the band parted ways with guitarist Bendelow and discovered singer Stella Grundy and dancer Lil' Anthony, changing their sound to a more dance-oriented style and changing their name to Intastella. They signed to MCA Records and hit the lower reaches of the UK Singles Chart with their first release, "Dream Some Paradise". Two follow-up singles fared similarly, and in late 1991 the band's debut album, Intastella and the Family of People was issued. The band's momentum was lost after Grundy broke her arm in a motorcycle accident, and they were dropped by MCA, returning in 1993 on the Planet-3 label with the Drifter EP, on which they worked with Shaun Ryder. The band's biggest hit came in 1995, with "The Night" reaching #60 in the UK, preceding their second album, What You Gonna Do featuring Manchester Harpist Katie Brett on the track "I'll Be Forever". Further singles followed during 1996 and 1997 but none repeated their earlier success. One of these, "Grandmaster", was used on the soundtrack of the 1997 film Love in Paris. A final album, Nuphonia, was released in 1997.

Grundy later emerged with a new band, Stella & the Doggs.

On 30 November 2019, it was announced that Anthony Green (or Little Anthony) had died. On 2 December, radio DJ Marc Riley played People by Intastella as a tribute.

In November 2021, it was announced that guitarist Martin Wright had died.

== Discography ==
=== Laugh ===
==== Albums ====
- Sensation No. 1 (1988), Sub Aqua

==== Singles, EPs ====
- "Take Your Time Yeah!" (1985), Debris (flexi-disc)
- "Take Your Time Yeah!" (1986), Remorse (12")
- "Paul McCartney" (1987), Remorse (7") - UK Indie #44
- "Time To Lose It" (1988), Remorse (7") - UK Indie #19
- "Sensation No.1 EP (1988), Sub Aqua (7"/12")

=== Intastella ===
==== Albums ====
- Intastella and the Family of People (1991), MCA
- What You Gonna Do (1995), Planet-3
- Nuphonia (1997), Planet-3
- Intastella Overdrive (2002), Castle Music - compilation

==== Singles, EPs ====
- "Dream Some Paradise" (1991), MCA - (UK #69)
- "People" (1991), MCA - UK #74
- "Century" (1991), MCA - UK #70
- Drifter EP (1993), Planet-3
- "Point Hope" (1994), Planet-3 - UK #87
- "The Night" (1995), Planet-3 - UK #60
- "Grandmaster" (1996), Planet-3 - UK #100
- "Past" (1996), Planet-3
- "Skyscraper Koolaid" (1997), Planet-3 - UK #81
- "Soon We'll Fly" (1997), Planet-3
