= New Order discography =

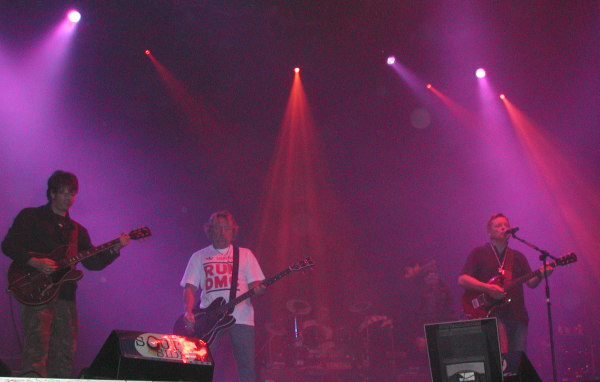
- New Order performing at Southside Festival in Neuhausen ob Eck, Germany in 2005
- Studio albums: 10
- Extended plays: 5
- Live albums: 6
- Compilation albums: 12
- Singles: 45
- Video albums: 12
- Music videos: 40

The discography of British band New Order consists of 10 studio albums, 12 compilation albums, six live albums, five extended plays (EPs), 45 singles, 12 video releases, 40 music videos and a number of soundtrack appearances. New Order were formed in 1980 by singer, guitarist and keyboardist Bernard Sumner, bassist Peter Hook and drummer Stephen Morris. The group began life as a continuation of their former incarnation Joy Division. Joy Division had disbanded after the death of the lead singer Ian Curtis. Gillian Gilbert, who was Morris's girlfriend at the time, soon joined the group and played guitar and keyboards.

Remarkably, New Order's first eight singles released between 1981 and 1984 were not taken from any album. In most cases they were not even released as a 7-inch, but exclusively available in the radio-unfriendly 12-inch format, an unusual approach for a pop-act in the eighties.

Despite the high anticipation that surrounded the group, their debut single "Ceremony" only peaked at number 34 on the UK Singles Chart. The group's following two singles and their debut album met with similar moderate success. It would not be until the release of their fourth single, "Blue Monday", that New Order would break into the top 10, with the song peaking at number 9. "Blue Monday" became a defining single for the group and caused a sensation, becoming the biggest selling 12-inch single of all time.

New Order, like many other post-punk groups of the period, increasingly utilised keyboards, drum machine and sequencers in their music. As a result, they became associated with the synthpop and electronic dance movements of the 1980s. Beginning with Power, Corruption & Lies from 1983, all of the group's studio albums reached the top 10 in the United Kingdom. The group experienced a lull in popularity in the years 1985 and 1986 but the surprise international popularity of the "Bizarre Love Triangle" single re-launched the group across the world. The group cemented their success in 1987 with the single, "True Faith", and the compilation album Substance.

New Order were at the peak of their popularity in the years 1987 to 1993, with a run of popular singles, including "Blue Monday 1988", "Fine Time", "Regret", "World (The Price of Love)" and in 1990 they scored their only number 1 single in the UK with the official England national football team song, "World in Motion". The two albums released during these years, Technique and Republic; each charted at number 1 in the UK. It was during this successful period that the group's internal dynamic began to falter. Sumner was not fond of touring, and wanted to take time off from the group and produce a solo album. He formed Electronic with Johnny Marr and the pair released their first single in 1989. Hook formed his own band, Revenge, in 1989, while Morris and Gilbert worked together as The Other Two, primarily scoring soundtracks. Of the three side projects, Sumner's was by far the most successful.

The recording and touring of 1993's Republic, their first for London Records, was difficult and intra-band tensions were rife. The group went on hiatus until 1998. In the meantime two compilation albums, The Best of New Order and The Rest of New Order, and several singles were released.

The group reconvened in 1998 for the Reading Festival but did not release new material until 2000. The group released the album Get Ready in 2001. It was met with critical warmth, but it was apparent that the group's popularity had lessened. The lead single from the album, "Crystal", reached the top 10 in the UK. The film 24 Hour Party People, a humorous chronicle of their label Factory Records, was released in 2002. New Order contributed a new song, "Here to Stay", and a re-recording of the Joy Division song "New Dawn Fades" with Moby, for the film's soundtrack. The compilation International and four-disc boxset Retro were released in winter 2002. New Order followed Get Ready with Waiting for the Sirens' Call in 2005. During this period Gilbert stepped down from live performances due to family commitments. Phil Cunningham stepped into her role and in 2005 became an official member of the group.

The group had intended to release a ninth album soon after Waiting for the Sirens' Call, the majority of which had already been recorded. The lack of enthusiasm inside the group and relative failure of Waiting for the Sirens' Call stalled their career momentum. In 2007, Hook decided to leave the group, and stated that he and Sumner had no further plans to work together. Sumner formed Bad Lieutenant with Cunningham, and Hook formed Freebass. Morris continued to work with Sumner and Cunningham. In 2008, New Order released remastered and expanded editions of their first five albums with the intention of releasing the further three albums in a similar format in the future. Lost Sirens was released in the United Kingdom on 14 January 2013. It is an eight-track album of tracks left out of Waiting for the Sirens' Call. On 25 September 2015, the band released a new album, Music Complete. The album was the first without Peter Hook, and was produced mostly by the band themselves, except "Singularity" and "Unlearn This Hatred", both produced by Tom Rowlands, while "Superheated" features additional production by Stuart Price. In 2020, New Order released "Be a Rebel", their first non-album single since "Here to Stay" in 2002.

In the US, the band has sold a certified 2 million albums, and in the UK a certified 1.24 million albums.

== Albums ==
=== Studio albums ===
Year	Album details	Peak chart positions										Certifications (sales thresholds)
Year	Album details	UK	UK Indie	AUS	FRA	GER	NLD	NZ	SWE	SWI	US	Certifications (sales thresholds)
1981	Movement: Release date: 13 November 1981; Label: Factory (FACT 50), Factory (US)	30	1	—	—	—	—	8	—	—	—	
1983	Power, Corruption & Lies: Release date: 2 May 1983; Label: Factory (FACT 75), Qwest	4	1	38	—	18	14	3	16	—	—	BPI: Gold
1985	Low-Life: Release date: 13 May 1985; Label: Factory (FACT 100), Qwest	7	1	70	—	—	34	11	20	—	94	MC: Gold
1986	Brotherhood: Release date: 29 September 1986; Label: Factory (FACT 150), Qwest	9	1	15	—	—	—	22	33	—	117	
1989	Technique: Release date: 30 January 1989; Label: Factory (FACT 275), Qwest	1	1	25	—	25	57	11	23	15	32	BPI: Gold; MC: Gold; RIAA: Gold
1993	Republic: Release date: 3 May 1993; Label: Centredate/London, Qwest	1	—	5	39	54	47	24	13	—	11	BPI: Gold; MC: Gold; RIAA: Gold
2001	Get Ready: Release date: 27 August 2001; Label: Reprise	6	—	7	21	7	61	17	11	24	41	BPI: Gold; ARIA: Gold; SNEP: Silver
2005	Waiting for the Sirens' Call: Release date: 26 April 2005; Label: Warner Bros.	5	—	15	22	14	52	19	7	44	46	BPI: Silver
2013	Lost Sirens: Release date: 14 January 2013; Label: Rhino	23	—	171	137	68	—	—	—	74	174	
2015	Music Complete: Release date: 25 September 2015; Label: Mute	2	1	20	19	14	10	37	14	19	34	BPI: Silver
"—" denotes releases that did not chart.

=== Compilations ===
Year	Album details	Peak chart positions										Certifications (sales thresholds)
Year	Album details	UK	UK Indie	AUS	FRA	GER	NLD	NZ	SWE	SWI	US	Certifications (sales thresholds)
1987	Substance 1987: Released: 17 August 1987; Labels: Factory (FACT 200), Qwest	3	1	12	—	14	42	4	49	10	36	BPI: Platinum; MC: Platinum; RIAA: Platinum
1990	The John Peel Sessions: Released: September 1990; Labels: Strange Fruit (SFRLP110)	—	—	—	—	—	—	—	—	—	—	
1994	(the best of) New Order: Released: 21 November 1994; Labels: London, Qwest	4	—	30	—	—	—	27	—	—	78	BPI: Platinum; MC: Gold
1995	(the rest of) New Order: Released: 21 August 1995; Labels: London, Qwest	5	—	114	—	—	—	—	41	—	—	
2002	Before & After – The BBC Sessions: Released: 16 July 2002; Labels: Fuel 2000	—	—	—	—	—	—	—	—	—	—	
2002	International: Released: 29 October 2002; Labels: London	—	—	109	99	—	—	—	—	—	—	
2002	Retro: Released: 9 December 2002; Labels: London	104	—	—	—	—	—	—	—	—	—	
2004	In Session: Released: 12 April 2004; Labels: Strange Fruit (SFRSCD128)	—	—	—	—	—	—	—	—	—	—	
2005	Best Remixes: Released: 21 June 2005; Labels: Warner Bros.	—	—	—	—	—	—	—	—	—	—	
2005	Singles: Released: 3 October 2005; Labels: London, Warner Bros.	14	—	117	—	—	—	—	—	—	—	BPI: Gold
2007	iTunes Originals – New Order: Released: 24 September 2007; Labels: London	—	—	—	—	—	—	—	—	—	—	
2011	Total: From Joy Division to New Order: Released: 6 June 2011; Labels: WEA, Rhino	51	—	—	—	—	—	—	—	—	—	BPI: Gold
2026	(The Best & the Rest of) New Order: Released: 17 July 2026; Labels: Warner Bros.	54	—	—	— (Note: (The Best & the Rest of) New Order did not enter the French Top Albums chart, but peaked at number 35 on the French Physical Albums chart.)	—	—	—	—	—	—	
"—" denotes releases that did not chart.

=== Live albums ===
Year	Album details	Peak chart positions		Certifications (sales thresholds)
Year	Album details	UK	UK Indie	Certifications (sales thresholds)
1992	BBC Radio 1 Live in Concert: Released: 10 February 1992; Labels: Strange Fruit (SFRSCD093)	33	—	BPI: Silver
2011	Live at the London Troxy: Released: 21 December 2011; Labels: Abbey Road Live	—	—	
2013	Live at Bestival 2012: Released: 8 July 2013; Labels: Sunday Best	89	21	
2017	NOMC15: Released: 26 May 2017; Labels: Live Here Now/Mute	—	—	
2019	Σ(No,12k,Lg,17Mif) New Order + Liam Gillick: So It Goes..: Released: 12 July 2019; Labels: Mute	35	2	
2021	Education Entertainment Recreation: Released: 7 May 2021; Labels: Warner Music	32	—	
"—" denotes releases that did not chart.

== Extended plays ==
Year	EP details	Peak chart positions	
Year	EP details	UK	UK Indie
1982	1981–1982: Released: November 1982; Label: Factory	—	4
1986	Peel Sessions 1982: Released: September 1986; Label: Strange Fruit	52	2
1987	Peel Sessions 1981: Released: December 1987; Label: Strange Fruit	95	5
2002	60 Miles an Hour – Australian Tour EP: Released: 2002; Label: London	—	—
2002	Confusion Remixes '02 (Note: Credited as 'New Order vs Arthur Baker'.): Released: 2002; Label: Whacked	64	5
2004	Acid House Mixes by 808 State: Released: 2004; Label: Rephlex	76	15
2017	Music Complete: Remix EP: Released: 7 April 2017; Label: Mute	—	—
"—" denotes releases that did not chart.

== Singles ==
Year	Title	Peak chart positions										Certifications	Album (Note: Note that many New Order singles were not available on their albums at the time of their release. All songs eventually did appear on many of New Order's compilation releases.)
Year	Title	UK	UK Indie	AUS	GER	IRE	NL	NZ	SWI	US	US Dance	Certifications	Album
1981	"Ceremony"	34	1	—	—	—	—	7	—	—	61		Non-album singles
1981	"Procession"	38	1	—	—	—	—	—	—	—	—		Non-album singles
1981	"Everything's Gone Green" (Note: "Everything's Gone Green" was only released in Belgium and later New Zealand, but was available in the UK on import.)	—	3	—	—	—	—	29	—	—	64		Non-album singles
1982	"Temptation"	29	1	—	—	—	—	—	—	—	68		Non-album singles
1983	"Blue Monday"	9	1	13	2	4	—	2	10	—	5	BPI: 3× Platinum	Non-album singles
1983	"Confusion"	12	1	72	—	7	—	7	—	—	5		Non-album singles
1984	"Thieves Like Us"	18	1	84	—	5	—	14	—	—	—		Non-album singles
1984	"Murder" (Note: "Murder" was only released in Belgium, but was available in the UK on import.)	92	2	—	—	—	—	—	—	—	—		Non-album singles
1985	"The Perfect Kiss"	46	1	85	—	15	40	10	—	—	5		Low-Life
1985	"Sub-culture"	63	1	—	—	—	—	29	—	—	35		Low-Life
1986	"Shellshock"	28	1	23	—	18	—	8	—	—	14		Pretty in Pink (Soundtrack)
1986	"State of the Nation"	30	1	—	—	—	—	17	—	—	4 (Note: "State of the Nation" and "Bizarre Love Triangle" charted together as a double A-side single on the Billboard Hot Dance Club Play chart.)		Brotherhood
1986	"Bizarre Love Triangle"	56	1	5	—	25	—	19	—	98 (Note: "Bizarre Love Triangle" was re-released in the US in 1995 and charted on the Billboard Hot 100; it did not feature on that chart in 1986.)	4		Brotherhood
1987	"True Faith"	4	1	8	8	5	59	4	13	32	3	BPI: Platinum	Substance
1987	"Touched by the Hand of God"	20	1	15	37	10	—	5	—	—	1 (Note: "Touched by the Hand of God" and "Blue Monday 1988" charted together as a double A-side single on the Billboard Hot Dance Club Play chart.)		Salvation! (Original Soundtrack)
1988	"Blue Monday 1988"	3	1	4	3	2	4	1	9	68	1		Non-album single
1988	"Fine Time"	11	1	20	—	9	—	3	—	—	2		Technique
1989	"Round & Round"	21	2	67	—	10	—	13	—	64	1		Technique
1989	"Run 2"	49	1	—	—	—	—	—	—	—	—		Technique
1990	"World in Motion" (Note: Credited as 'Englandneworder'.)	1	1	21	21	7	—	8	27	—	10	BPI: Gold	Non-album single
1993	"Regret"	4	—	26	39	5	—	30	—	28	1		Republic
1993	"Ruined in a Day"	22	—	182	—	—	—	—	—	—	—		Republic
1993	"World (The Price of Love)"	13	—	87	77	27	—	—	—	92	1		Republic
1993	"Spooky"	22	—	—	—	—	—	—	—	—	6		Republic
1994	"True Faith-94"	9	—	69	—	11	—	—	—	—	—		The Best of New Order
1995	"1963"	21	—	—	—	29	—	—	—	—	—		The Best of New Order
1995	"Blue Monday-95"	17	—	109	54	29	—	—	—	—	—		The Rest of New Order
1997	"Video 5 8 6"	86	—	—	—	—	—	—	—	—	—		Non-album single
2001	"Crystal"	8	—	53	39	24	—	—	83	—	1		Get Ready
2001	"60 Miles an Hour"	29	—	37	—	—	—	—	—	—	—		Get Ready
2002	"Here to Stay"	15	—	64	77	42	—	—	—	—	—		24 Hour Party People (Soundtrack)
2005	"Krafty"	8	—	54	65	26	—	—	—	—	2		Waiting for the Sirens' Call
2005	"Jetstream"	20	—	79	86	30	—	—	—	—	3		Waiting for the Sirens' Call
2005	"Waiting for the Sirens' Call"	21	—	—	—	—	—	—	—	—	—		Waiting for the Sirens' Call
2015	"Restless"	—	—	—	—	—	—	—	—	—	—		Music Complete
2015	"Tutti Frutti"	— (Note: "Tutti Frutti" did not enter the UK Singles Chart, but debuted and peaked at number 4 on the UK Physical Singles Chart Top 100.)	44	—	—	—	—	—	—	—	—		Music Complete
2016	"Singularity"	—	—	—	—	—	—	—	—	—	—		Music Complete
2016	"People on the High Line"	—	—	—	—	—	—	—	—	—	—		Music Complete
2020	"Be a Rebel"	— (Note: "Be a Rebel" did not enter the UK Singles Chart, but peaked at number 1 on the UK Physical Singles Chart, and number 11 on the UK Singles Sales Chart Top 100.)	—	—	—	—	—	—	—	—	—		Non-album single
"—" denotes releases that did not chart.

=== Promotional singles ===
Year	Song	Chart positions	Album
Year	Song	US Dance	Album
1995	"Let's Go (Nothing For Me)"	—	The Best of New Order
2001	"Someone Like You"	34	Get Ready
2005	"Guilt Is a Useless Emotion"	3	Waiting for the Sirens' Call
2011	"Hellbent"	—	Total: From Joy Division to New Order
2015	"Plastic"	—	Music Complete

== Miscellaneous ==
- The Peter Saville Show Soundtrack (2003) (limited edition of 3000 copies)
- 12x12" (2006) (vinyl only releases of 12 singles)

== Other appearances ==
Year	Song	Album
1980	"Haystack" (with Kevin Hewick)	From Brussels with Love
1982	"Rocking Carol"	The Hacienda Christmas Flexi – Factory FAC 51B
1982	"Freude Schoener Gotterfunken [Song of Joy]"	The Hacienda Christmas Flexi – Factory FAC 51B
1986	"Shellshock"	Pretty in Pink: Original Motion Picture Soundtrack
1986	"Temptation"	Something Wild: Music from the Motion Picture
1986	"Theme (Hommage à la MGM)"	The Quick Neat Job
1987	"Let's Go"	Salvation! (Original Soundtrack)
1987	"Salvation Theme"	Salvation! (Original Soundtrack)
1987	"Skullcrusher"	Salvation! (Original Soundtrack)
1987	"Sputnik"	Salvation! (Original Soundtrack)
1987	"Touched by the Hand of God"	Salvation! (Original Soundtrack)
1996	"Temptation"	Trainspotting: Music from the Motion Picture
1998	"Confusion" (Pump Panel Reconstruction Mix)	Blade: Music from and Inspired by the Motion Picture
1998	"Blue Monday"	The Wedding Singer: Music from the Motion Picture
2000	"True Faith"	American Psycho: Music from the Controversial Motion Picture
2000	"Brutal"	The Beach: Motion Picture Soundtrack
2001	"Blue Monday"	Buffalo Soldiers
2002	"Blue Monday"	24 Hour Party People: Music from the Motion Picture
2002	"Here to Stay"	24 Hour Party People: Music from the Motion Picture
2002	"New Dawn Fades" (with Moby)	24 Hour Party People: Music from the Motion Picture
2002	"Temptation"	24 Hour Party People: Music from the Motion Picture
2002	"Crystal"	CSI: Crime Scene Investigation
2003	"Vietnam"	War Child: Hope
2004	"Temptation"	D.E.B.S.: Original Soundtrack
2004	"Temptation"	Left of the Dial: Dispatches from the '80s Underground
2006	"Ceremony"	Marie Antoinette: Original Soundtrack
2007	"Exit"	Control: Original Soundtrack
2007	"Get Out"	Control: Original Soundtrack
2007	"Hypnosis"	Control: Original Soundtrack
2009	"Your Silent Face"	Bronson: Original Soundtrack
2016	"Elegia"	Stranger Things: Episode 5 - "The Flea and the Acrobat"
2019	"4′33″"	STUMM433 box (c) Mute

== Videos ==
Year	Album details
1983	Taras Shevchenko: Released: August 1983; Label: Factory (FAC77); Formats: VHS
1985	Pumped Full of Drugs: Released: 1985; Label: Factory (FAC177); Formats: VHS, LaserDisc, DVD
1989	Academy: Released: 1989; Label: Palace (PVC 3019 M); Formats: VHS
1989	Substance 1989: Released: 1989; Label: Factory (FACT225); Formats: VHS, LaserDisc, CDV
1993	New Order Story: Released: 1993; Label: PolyGram (#087 134-3); Formats: VHS, LaserDisc, DVD
1994	(The Best Of) NewOrder: Released: 1994; Label: PolyGram Video (#8285801); Formats: LaserDisc
2001	New Order 3 16: Released: 2001; Label: Warner Music Vision (#8573-84802-2); Formats: DVD
2001	Crystal: Released: 2001; Label: London Records 90 (#NCDJ8); Formats: DVD single
2002	Here to Stay: Released: 2002; Label: London Records 90 (#NUDVD11); Formats: DVD single
2002	New Order 511: Released: 2002; Label: Warner Music Vision (#0927 49366-2); Formats: DVD
2005	A Collection: Released: 19 September 2005; Label: Warner Music Vision (#0349 70484-2); Formats: DVD
2008	Live in Glasgow: Released: 2 June 2008; Label: Warner Music Vision (#5051442-8468-2-9); Formats: DVD

== Music videos ==
Year	Title	Director
1983	"Blue Monday"	
1983	"Confusion"	Charles Sturridge
1985	"The Perfect Kiss"	Jonathan Demme
1986	"Shellshock"	Richard Elgood
1986	"State of the Nation"	Big TV
1986	"Bizarre Love Triangle"	Robert Longo
1987	"True Faith"	Philippe Decouflé
1987	"Touched by the Hand of God"	Kathryn Bigelow
1988	"Blue Monday 1988"	Robert Breer and William Wegman
1988	"Fine Time"	Richard Heslop
1989	"Round & Round"	Paula Greif
1989	"Round & Round" (USA/Patti)	Paula Greif
1989	"Run 2"	Robert Frank
1990	"World in Motion"	The Bailey Brothers
1993	"Regret"	Peter Care
1993	"Regret" (Baywatch version)	Thomas Mignone
1993	"Ruined in a Day"	Keith Allen
1993	"World (The Price of Love)"	Bailley Walsh
1993	"World (The Price of Love)" (Perfecto Remix)	Bailley Walsh
1993	"World (The Price of Love)" (US version)	
1993	"Spooky" (Fluke Minimix)	Richard Heslop
1994	"True Faith-94"	
1995	"1963" (Arthur Baker Mix)	Gina Birch
1995	"Blue Monday-95"	
2001	"Crystal"	Johan Renck
2001	"Crystal" (Club Remix Edit; Gina Birch version)	Gina Birch
2001	"60 Miles an Hour"	Leigh Marling and Rob Leggatt
2002	"Here to Stay"	Paul Gore
2005	"Krafty"	Johan Renck
2005	"Jetstream"	Dawn Shadforth
2005	"Waiting for the Sirens' Call"	John Hardwick
2005	"Ceremony"	Yu Likwai
2005	"Temptation" (Titled "The Temptation of Victoria")	Michael H. Shamberg
2015	"Restless"	NYSU
2016	"Tutti Frutti"	Tom Haines
2016	"Singularity"	Jörg A. Hoppe, Heiko Lange & Klaus Maeck
2016	"People on the High Line"	Grace Lambert & Jackson Ducasse
2016	"People on the High Line" (Claptone Remix Edit)	Zac Witte
2020	"Be a Rebel"	NYSU
2020	"Age of Consent"	Tina Reingaard
