= North American Tour 2012 (New Order) =

2012 concert tour by New Order

- Tour by New Order
- Location: North America
- Start date: 5 October 2012
- End date: 24 October 2012
- No. of shows: 10

The North American Tour 2012 was a concert tour by the English band New Order.

"We've been having such a great time together this year, playing shows all over Europe, and we're all really excited to be playing America again. We have so many friends and fans there we can't wait to get back!"

— Bernard Sumner, Rolling Stone, 2012.

== Background ==
In July 2012, New Order announced their first North American tour in seven years. Initially scheduled to play six shows in the United States and one show in Canada, the band later added additional shows at the Roseland Ballroom in New York City and the Sony Centre for the Performing Arts in Toronto, along with their very first show in Mexico as part of the Corona Capital Festival held annually at the Autódromo Hermanos Rodríguez (Rodríguez Brothers Racetrack) in Mexico City. The Toronto shows were the band's first in Canada since 2001.

== Opening acts ==
- Run Run Run (Oakland, Los Angeles)
- DJ Brent Hall (Oakland)
- DJ Mario Cotto (Los Angeles)
- Flashlights (Broomfield)
- DJ Boyhollow (Broomfield)
- Ishi (Dallas)
- DJ Little Man (Dallas)
- Win Win (New York City, Toronto)
- DJs Justin Strauss and Billy Caldwell (New York City; 18 October 2012)
- DJs Adesh and Lara (New York City; 19 October 2012)
- The Hudson Branch (Chicago)
- DJ Nate Manic (Chicago)
- DJ Nick Fiorucci (Toronto)

== Setlist ==
Oakland; 5 October 2012
1. "Elegia"
2. "Crystal"
3. "Ceremony"
4. "Close Range"
5. "Age of Consent"
6. "Isolation"
7. "Here to Stay"
8. "Your Silence Face"
9. "Bizarre Love Triangle"
10. "5 8 6"
11. "True Faith"
12. "The Perfect Kiss"
13. "Blue Monday"
14. "Temptation"
  Encore
15. "Atmosphere"
16. "Love Will Tear Us Apart"
Los Angeles; 7 October 2012
1. "Elegia"
2. "Crystal"
3. "Ceremony"
4. "Age of Consent"
5. "Isolation"
6. "Love Vigilantes"
7. "Close Range"
8. "Your Silence Face"
9. "Bizarre Love Triangle"
10. "5 8 6"
11. "True Faith"
12. "The Perfect Kiss"
13. "Blue Monday"
14. "Temptation"
  Encore
15. "Atmosphere"
16. "Love Will Tear Us Apart"
Broomfield; 10 October 2012
1. "Elegia"
2. "Crystal"
3. "Regret"
4. "Ceremony"
5. "Age of Consent"
6. "Isolation"
7. "Here to Stay"
8. "Your Silence Face"
9. "Bizarre Love Triangle"
10. "5 8 6"
11. "True Faith"
12. "The Perfect Kiss"
13. "Blue Monday"
14. "Temptation"
  Encore
15. "Atmosphere"
16. "Transmission"
17. "Love Will Tear Us Apart"
Dallas; 12 October 2012
1. "Elegia"
2. "Crystal"
3. "Ceremony"
4. "Age of Consent"
5. "Love Vigilantes"
6. "Isolation"
7. "Here to Stay"
8. "Your Silence Face"
9. "Bizarre Love Triangle"
10. "5 8 6"
11. "True Faith"
12. "The Perfect Kiss"
13. "Blue Monday"
14. "Temptation"
  Encore
15. "Atmosphere"
16. "Shadowplay"
17. "Transmission"
18. "Love Will Tear Us Apart"
Mexico City; 14 October 2012
1. "Elegia"
2. "Crystal"
3. "Ceremony"
4. "Age of Consent"
5. "Isolation"
6. "Here to Stay"
7. "Your Silence Face"
8. "Bizarre Love Triangle"
9. "5 8 6"
10. "True Faith"
11. "The Perfect Kiss"
12. "Blue Monday"
13. "Temptation"
  Encore
14. "Atmosphere"
15. "Love Will Tear Us Apart"
New York City; 18 October 2012
1. "Elegia"
2. "Crystal"
3. "Ceremony"
4. "Age of Consent"
5. "Love Vigilantes"
6. "Here to Stay"
7. "Your Silence Face"
8. "1963"
9. "Close Range"
10. "Bizarre Love Triangle"
11. "5 8 6"
12. "True Faith"
13. "The Perfect Kiss"
14. "Blue Monday"
15. "Temptation"
  Encore
16. "Atmosphere"
17. "Love Will Tear Us Apart"
New York City; 19 October 2012
1. "Elegia"
2. "Crystal"
3. "Ceremony"
4. "Age of Consent"
5. "Isolation"
6. "Here to Stay"
7. "Your Silence Face"
8. "Krafty"
9. "Close Range"
10. "Bizarre Love Triangle"
11. "5 8 6"
12. "True Faith"
13. "The Perfect Kiss"
14. "Blue Monday"
15. "Temptation"
  Encore
16. "Atmosphere"
17. "Love Will Tear Us Apart"
Chicago; 21 October 2012
1. "Elegia"
2. "Crystal"
3. "Regret"
4. "Ceremony"
5. "Age of Consent"
6. "Love Vigilantes"
7. "Here to Stay"
8. "Your Silence Face"
9. "Close Range"
10. "Bizarre Love Triangle"
11. "5 8 6"
12. "True Faith"
13. "The Perfect Kiss"
14. "Blue Monday"
15. "Temptation"
  Encore
16. "Heart and Soul"
17. "Atmosphere"
18. "Love Will Tear Us Apart"
Toronto; 23 October 2012
1. "Elegia"
2. "Crystal"
3. "Regret"
4. "Ceremony"
5. "Age of Consent"
6. "Isolation"
7. "Here to Stay"
8. "Your Silence Face"
9. "Waiting for the Sirens' Call"
10. "Bizarre Love Triangle"
11. "5 8 6"
12. "True Faith"
13. "The Perfect Kiss"
14. "Blue Monday"
15. "Temptation"
  Encore
16. "Transmission"
17. "Love Will Tear Us Apart"
Toronto; 24 October 2012
1. "Elegia"
2. "Crystal"
3. "Regret"
4. "Ceremony"
5. "Age of Consent"
6. "Love Vigilantes"
7. "Krafty"
8. "Your Silence Face"
9. "Close Range"
10. "Bizarre Love Triangle"
11. "5 8 6"
12. "True Faith"
13. "The Perfect Kiss"
14. "Blue Monday"
15. "Temptation"
  Encore
16. "Shadowplay"
17. "Transmission"
18. "Love Will Tear Us Apart"

== Tour dates ==
Date	City	Country	Venue
North America
5 October 2012	Oakland	United States	Fox Oakland Theatre
7 October 2012	Los Angeles	United States	Greek Theatre
10 October 2012	Broomfield	United States	1stBank Center
12 October 2012	Dallas	United States	Palladium Ballroom
14 October 2012^{[A]}	Mexico City	Mexico	Autódromo Hermanos Rodríguez
18 October 2012	New York City	United States	Roseland Ballroom
19 October 2012	New York City	United States	Roseland Ballroom
21 October 2012	Chicago	United States	Aragon Ballroom
23 October 2012	Toronto	Canada	Sony Centre for the Performing Arts
24 October 2012	Toronto	Canada	Sony Centre for the Performing Arts

Festivals and other miscellaneous performances
^{A} This concert was a part of the Corona Capital Festival.
