= Live at the London Troxy =

Live album by New Order
- Released: 21 December 2011
- Recorded: 10 December 2011, The Troxy, Tower Hamlets, London
- Genre: Post-punk, alternative dance, synthpop, alternative rock
- Length: 89:59
- Label: Abbey Road – Live Here Now Recordings

New Order live albums chronology
BBC Radio 1 Live In Concert (1992)	Live at the London Troxy (2011)	Live at Bestival 2012 (2013)

Professional ratings
Review scores
Source	Rating
COMA Music Magazine	(Favorable)

Live at the London Troxy is a live album by New Order, recorded on 10 December 2011 at The Troxy in London. The concert was released in both a 2-CD set and a 320 kbit/s MP3 download. The download was made available on 21 December 2011, while the 2-CD set shipped the first week of January 2012.

This release was the first since the band decided to reunite with its new lineup, featuring the return of keyboardist Gillian Gilbert, and Tom Chapman replacing former bassist Peter Hook. The sold-out show was their first performance in London in over five years, and the album includes the entire performance. During their 90-minute set, New Order performed songs spanning 25 years of hits, alongside songs not played live since the 1980s ("586", "Age of Consent", "Elegia", "1963"), culminating with a rendition of Joy Division's "Love Will Tear Us Apart".

== Track listing ==
All songs written by Bernard Sumner, Stephen Morris, Peter Hook and Gillian Gilbert, except where noted.

Disc one
No.	Title	Writer(s)	Length
1.	"Elegia"		2:22
2.	"Crystal"		6:34
3.	"Regret"	Bernard Sumner, Stephen Morris, Peter Hook, Gillian Gilbert, Stephen Hague	4:49
4.	"Ceremony"	Ian Curtis, Bernard Sumner, Stephen Morris, Peter Hook	5:06
5.	"Age of Consent"		6:00
6.	"Love Vigilantes"		4:43
7.	"Krafty"	Bernard Sumner, Stephen Morris, Peter Hook, Phil Cunningham	5:44
8.	"1963"		6:28
9.	"Bizarre Love Triangle"		5:16
10.	"True Faith"		7:28
11.	"586"		6:15
12.	"The Perfect Kiss"		7:06
13.	"Temptation"		9:38

Disc two
No.	Title	Writer(s)	Length
1.	"Blue Monday"		7:45
2.	"Love Will Tear Us Apart"	Ian Curtis, Bernard Sumner, Stephen Morris, Peter Hook	4:45
