= Live at Bestival 2012 =

Live album by New Order
- Released: 8 July 2013
- Recorded: September 2012; Robin Hill, Isle of Wight, England
- Genre: Post-punk, alternative dance, alternative rock, synthpop
- Length: 72:14
- Label: Sunday Best

New Order chronology
Lost Sirens (2013)	Live at Bestival 2012 (2013)	Music Complete (2015)

Professional ratings
Aggregate scores
Source	Rating
Metacritic	76/100
Review scores
Source	Rating
Pitchfork	6.4/10
Drowned in Sound	6/10

Live at Bestival 2012 is a live album by English band New Order, recorded in September 2012 at Bestival 2012, which was held at Robin Hill, Isle of Wight, England. It was released via Sunday Best on 8 July 2013.

All the profits raised from the album will be donated to Isle of Wight Youth Truth, which offers support services for young people on the Isle of Wight. The track listing features mostly a selection of greatest hits, such as "Bizarre Love Triangle" and "True Faith". It also includes three Joy Division songs: "Isolation", "Transmission" and "Love Will Tear Us Apart".

Like the previous live release, Live at the London Troxy, this album features Tom Chapman replacing former member Peter Hook on bass guitar.

== Track listing ==
All songs written by Bernard Sumner, Stephen Morris, Peter Hook and Gillian Gilbert, except where noted.

No.	Title	Writer(s)	Length
1.	"Elegia"		2:54
2.	"Regret"	Bernard Sumner, Stephen Morris, Peter Hook, Gillian Gilbert, Stephen Hague	4:05
3.	"Isolation"	Ian Curtis, Sumner, Morris, Hook	3:14
4.	"Krafty"	Sumner, Morris, Hook, Phil Cunningham	4:59
5.	"Here to Stay"		6:17
6.	"Bizarre Love Triangle"		4:50
7.	"586"		5:39
8.	"The Perfect Kiss"		6:32
9.	"True Faith"		6:59
10.	"Blue Monday"		7:08
11.	"Temptation"		10:07
12.	"Transmission"	Curtis, Sumner, Morris, Hook	4:04
13.	"Love Will Tear Us Apart"	Curtis, Sumner, Morris, Hook	5:26

== Charts ==
Chart (2013)	Peak position
Belgian Albums Chart (Wallonia)	125
UK Albums Chart	89
