= Total: From Joy Division to New Order =

Compilation album by Joy Division and New Order
- Released: 6 June 2011
- Recorded: 1978–2004
- Genre: Post-punk
- Length: 77:12
- Label: Rhino

Joy Division compilations chronology
The Best of Joy Division (2008)	Total: From Joy Division to New Order (2011)

New Order albums chronology
iTunes Originals – New Order (2007)	Total: From Joy Division to New Order (2011)

Total: From Joy Division to New Order is a compilation album of material from the British bands Joy Division and New Order. It was released in the United Kingdom on 6 June 2011 by Rhino Entertainment and is the first album to feature songs from both bands in one album. It features five Joy Division tracks, including "Love Will Tear Us Apart", and 13 New Order tracks, including a previously unreleased track, "Hellbent". A digital deluxe version also includes music videos. A double vinyl edition was released in 2018.

In October 2019, the album was certified Gold by British Phonographic Industry (BPI).

== Background ==
The record label were unhappy with calling the record a "Best Of", so after brainstorming with New Order, the title Total was eventually chosen by Bernard Sumner.

The album cover was created by Howard Wakefield who previously served as understudy to Peter Saville. Saville was involved in art direction and told The Guardian: "I realised this was a record that would be sold in supermarkets and advertised on television. So the cover has a 'pile it high, sell it cheap' aesthetic. As you open it out, it says Total, but folded up you just see the 'O's. It says, 'From Joy Division to New Order'. I couldn't bear the words 'Best of'. It's a long way from the independent record shop to Tesco, almost 33 years. At Factory, I had a freedom that was unprecedented in communications design. We lived out an ideal, without business calling the shots. It was a phenomenon."

The A&R for the release was handled by the band, Andrew Robinson (co-manager) and Gary Lancaster of Warner Music. In a bid to offer fans something new compared to previous compilations, the album included four never-before on CD versions of the bands' tracks. These tracks include the original 7″ version of "True Faith" and Shep Pettibone's 7″ remix of "Bizarre Love Triangle," though these were later included on the "corrected" 2016 reissue of Singles. Total also includes a unique 4:23 edit of "The Perfect Kiss" which is very similar to and the same length as the US 7″ single version, but which uses a different four bar section of instrumental music from the album version than the 7″ version has. All tracks were mastered from original source tapes by Frank Arkwright.

== Reception ==
Professional ratings
Review scores
Source	Rating
AllMusic	2/5 stars
The Irish Independent	Negative

John Meagher, who wrote for the "Day & Night" section of The Irish Independent, opined that "there's nothing here to attract existing fans of either bands. Instead, all Total does is to reinforce the idea that Joy Division/New Order was a hugely exciting source of music between 1978 and 1990 and New Order has been a pitiful shadow of their once-visionary selves ever since."

== Track listing ==
CD edition
No.	Title	Writer(s)	Album	Length
1.	"Transmission"	Ian Curtis, Peter Hook, Stephen Morris, Bernard Sumner	Non-album single (1979)	3:38
2.	"Love Will Tear Us Apart"	Curtis, Hook, Morris, Sumner	Non-album single (1980)	3:26
3.	"Isolation"	Curtis, Hook, Morris, Sumner	Closer (1980)	2:54
4.	"She's Lost Control" (12" Version)	Curtis, Hook, Morris, Sumner	"Atmosphere" single (1980)	4:46
5.	"Atmosphere"	Curtis, Hook, Morris, Sumner	Non-album single (1980)	4:10
6.	"Ceremony" (Version 1)	Curtis, Hook, Morris, Sumner	Non-album single (1981)	4:37
7.	"Temptation" (7" Version)	Gillian Gilbert, Hook, Morris, Sumner	Non-album single (1982)	5:24
8.	"Blue Monday"	Gilbert, Hook, Morris, Sumner	Non-album single (1983)	7:29
9.	"Thieves Like Us" (7″ Promo Edit)	Arthur Baker, Gilbert, Hook, Morris, Sumner	Non-album single (1984)	3:56
10.	"The Perfect Kiss" (QWEST/US 7″ Edit)	Gilbert, Hook, Morris, Sumner	Low-Life (1985)	4:26
11.	"Bizarre Love Triangle" (Shep Pettibone 7″ Remix Edit)	Gilbert, Hook, Morris, Sumner	Brotherhood (1986)	3:46
12.	"True Faith" (7″ Version)	Gilbert, Stephen Hague, Hook, Morris, Sumner	Substance (1987)	4:12
13.	"Fine Time" (7″ Version)	Gilbert, Hook, Morris, Sumner	Technique (1989)	3:10
14.	"World in Motion"	Keith Allen, Gilbert, Hook, Morris, Sumner	Non-album single (1990)	4:32
15.	"Regret"	Gilbert, Hague, Hook, Morris, Sumner	Republic (1993)	4:10
16.	"Crystal" (Radio Edit)	Gilbert, Hook, Morris, Sumner	Get Ready (2001)	4:20
17.	"Krafty" (Single Edit)	Phil Cunningham, Hook, Morris, Sumner	Waiting for the Sirens' Call (2005)	3:47
18.	"Hellbent"	Hook, Morris, Sumner	Previously unreleased (Note: Later released on Lost Sirens (2013))	4:29

- Tracks 1–5 performed by Joy Division.
- Tracks 6–18 performed by New Order.

Digital deluxe edition bonus videos
No.	Title	Length
1.	"Love Will Tear Us Apart"	3:39
2.	"Atmosphere"	4:33
3.	"Temptation"	7:01
4.	"Blue Monday '88"	4:07
5.	"The Perfect Kiss"	10:39
6.	"Bizarre Love Triangle"	3:52
7.	"True Faith"	4:21
8.	"World in Motion"	4:04
9.	"Fine Time"	3:23
10.	"Regret"	3:58
11.	"Crystal"	4:20
12.	"Krafty"	3:48

- Tracks 1 and 2 performed by Joy Division.
- Tracks 3–12 performed by New Order.

== Charts ==
Chart (2011)	Peak position
Irish Albums (IRMA)	77
Scottish Albums (Official Charts)	53
UK Albums (Official Charts)	51

Chart (2025)	Peak position
Greek Albums (IFPI)	31

== Certifications ==
Region	Certification	Certified units/sales
United Kingdom (BPI)	Gold	100,000^{‡}
^{‡} Sales+streaming figures based on certification alone.
