= Retro (New Order album) =

Box set by New Order
- Released: 9 December 2002
- Recorded: 1981–2002
- Genres: Rock, house, synth-pop
- Length: 359:06 (five-disc version)
- Label: London
- Producers: New Order, Martin Hannett, John Robie, Stephen Hague, Steven Osbourne

New Order chronology
International (2002)	Retro (2002)	Waiting for the Sirens' Call (2005)

Professional ratings
Review scores
Source	Rating
AllMusic	3/5 stars
BBC	not rated
Blender	1/5 stars
NME	7/10
Pitchfork	4.8/10
Rolling Stone	4/5 stars
Stylus	B−

Retro is a 2002 box set of music by the English rock band New Order. It comprises four themed CDs. In the UK, initial quantities came with a fifth disc which featured tracks with limited release numbers.

== History ==
The box set was released as a compromise. The band's manager, Rob Gretton, had originally envisioned a box set called Recycle, which would feature all the singles New Order had released, one single per CD, in a grand 20 CD box. However, London Records deemed this excessive, and the idea was shelved. New Order released Get Ready in 2001 and a year later Retro surfaced.

The CDs each have a particular theme: Pop, Fan, Club and Live. Each one was selected by a friend of the band.

The idea of the limited edition fifth bonus disc was hatched as a direct result of online protestation that the Recycle project had been abandoned. Fans of the band saw the Retro track listing as a disappointing cash-in exercise as it offered nothing rare or noteworthy, and no tracks that weren't already widely available on CD. Dissent voiced on the NewOrderOnline message board caught the eye of the band's management who negotiated with HMV to fund the limited run of 3000 discs that were included in initial copies of the box set sold exclusively by their UK stores.

== Track listing ==
All songs written by New Order, except where noted.

Disc one: Pop (Selected by Miranda Sawyer, journalist)
No.	Title	Writer(s)	Length
1.	"Fine Time" (from Technique)		4:42
2.	"Temptation" (from 12" single Fac63)		8:42
3.	"True Faith" (from Substance)	New Order, Stephen Hague	5:53
4.	"The Perfect Kiss" (from Low-Life)		4:49
5.	"Ceremony" (from 12" single Fac33)	Joy Division	4:24
6.	"Regret" (from Republic)	New Order, Stephen Hague	4:08
7.	"Crystal" (from Get Ready)		6:49
8.	"Bizarre Love Triangle" (from Brotherhood)		4:21
9.	"Confusion" (from 12" single Fac93)	New Order, Arthur Baker	8:13
10.	"Round & Round" (from Technique)		4:31
11.	"Blue Monday" (from 12" single Fac73)		7:28
12.	"Brutal" (from The Beach Motion Picture Soundtrack)		4:49
13.	"Slow Jam" (from Get Ready)		4:52
14.	"Everyone Everywhere" (from Republic)	New Order, Stephen Hague	4:25

Disc two: Fan (Selected by John McCready, music journalist)
No.	Title	Writer(s)	Length
1.	"Elegia" (from Low-Life)		4:55
2.	"In a Lonely Place" (from 12" single Fac33)	Joy Division	6:15
3.	"Procession" (from 7" single Fac63)		4:28
4.	"Your Silent Face" (from Power, Corruption & Lies)		5:59
5.	"Sunrise" (from Low-Life)		6:00
6.	"Let's Go" (from The Best of New Order (US))		3:53
7.	"Broken Promise" (from Brotherhood)		3:45
8.	"Dreams Never End" (from Movement)		3:12
9.	"Cries and Whispers" (from Everything's Gone Green; single FBNL 8)		3:25
10.	"All Day Long" (from Brotherhood)		5:10
11.	"Sooner Than You Think" (from Low-Life)		5:12
12.	"Leave Me Alone" (from Power, Corruption & Lies)		4:39
13.	"Lonesome Tonight" (from 12" single Fac103)		5:11
14.	"Every Little Counts" (from Brotherhood)		4:28
15.	"Run Wild" (from Get Ready)		3:56

Disc three: Club (Selected by Mike Pickering, DJ)
No.	Title	Writer(s)	Length
1.	"Confusion (Koma & Bones Vocal mix)" (with Bernard's new vocal)	New Order, Arthur Baker	6:01
2.	"Paradise (Robert Racic mix)" (from 12" single Fac183R)		6:40
3.	"Regret (Sabres Slow 'n' Low mix)" (from 12" single NUOX1)	New Order, Stephen Hague	6:42
4.	"Bizarre Love Triangle (Shep Pettibone Extended remix)" (from 12" single Fac163)		6:42
5.	"Shellshock (John Robie mix)" (from Substance)	New Order, John Robie	6:28
6.	"Fine Time (Steve 'Silk' Hurley mix)" (from 12" single Fac233R)		6:16
7.	"1963 ('95 Arthur Baker mix)" (from CD single NUCDP6)	New Order, Stephen Hague	5:04
8.	"Touched by the Hand of God (7" version)" (from 7" single Fac193)		3:42
9.	"Everything's Gone Green" (from 12" single FBNL8)		5:31
10.	"Blue Monday (Jam & Spoon Manuela mix)" (from CD single NUOCD7)		6:39
11.	"World in Motion (Subbuteo mix)" (Pickering/Parke mix, from Fac293R)	New Order, Keith Allen	5:08
12.	"Here to Stay (Extended instrumental)" (Chemical Brothers remix, from Here to Stay (AUS release))		5:55
13.	"Crystal (Lee Coombs mix)" (A shorter version of the Lee Coombs remix)		7:03

Disc four: Live (Selected by Bobby Gillespie, vocalist from Primal Scream)
No.	Title	Writer(s)	Length
1.	"Ceremony" (Studio 54, Barcelona, 7 July 1984)	Joy Division	4:49
2.	"Procession" (Polytechnic of Central London, 6 December 1985)		3:34
3.	"Everything's Gone Green" (Recreation Centre, Kingston-upon-Thames, Tolworth, London 12 March 1983)		5:09
4.	"In a Lonely Place" (Glastonbury Festival, 20 June 1981)	Joy Division	5:37
5.	"Age of Consent" (Spectrum Arena, Warrington, 1 March 1986)		5:02
6.	"Elegia" (Glastonbury Festival, 19 June 1987)		4:46
7.	"The Perfect Kiss" (Glastonbury Festival, 19 June 1987)		9:43
8.	"Fine Time" (claims to be from Hoffman Estates, Chicago, 30 June 1989 but is really Blossom Music Center, Cuyahoga Falls, OH 5 July 1989)		5:04
9.	"World" (Starplex Amphitheatre, Dallas, 21 July 1993)	New Order, Stephen Hague	4:46
10.	"Regret" (Reading Festival, 29 August 1993)	New Order, Stephen Hague	4:02
11.	"As It Is When It Was" (Reading Festival, 29 August 1993)		3:48
12.	"Intermission by Alan Wise" (Olympia, Paris, 12 November 2001)		1:20
13.	"Crystal" (Big Day Out, Gold Coast, 20 January 2002)		6:51
14.	"Turn My Way" (Olympia, Liverpool, 18 July 2001)		4:57
15.	"Temptation" (Academy, Brixton, 10 October 2001)		7:47

Disc five limited edition CD: Bonus
No.	Title	Writer(s)	Length
1.	"Temptation '98"		4:08
2.	"Transmission (Live)"	Joy Division	4:01
3.	"Such a Good Thing" (from CD single NUOCD12)		4:08
4.	"Theme from "Best & Marsh"" (from 12" single Fac263)		4:26
5.	"Let's G..." (extract from instrumental used on Salvation! motion picture soundtrack)		2:03
6.	"True Faith (Pink Noise Morel edit)"	New Order, Stephen Hague	4:29
7.	"Run Wild (Steve Osborne Original mix)"		4:13
8.	"The Perfect Kiss (Live take recorded at video shoot)"		9:56
9.	"Elegia (Full version)"		17:30

== Charts ==
Chart performance for Retro
Chart (2002–2003)	Peak position
UK Albums (Official Charts)	104
US Top Dance Albums (Billboard)	15
