= BBC Radio 1 Live in Concert (New Order album) =

- Original 1992 edition

Live album by New Order
- Released: 10 February 1992; 26 June 2000 (re-release)
- Recorded: 19 June 1987 at Glastonbury Festival, Pilton, Somerset, UK
- Genre: Post-punk, synthpop
- Label: Windsong International WIN LP 011 (1992); Fuel 2000 Records/Strange Fruit SFRSCD093 (re-release)
- Producer: Pete Ritzema

New Order chronology
The Peel Sessions (1990)	BBC Radio 1 Live in Concert (1992)	Republic (1993)

Professional ratings
Review scores
Source	Rating
Allmusic	3/5 stars

BBC Radio 1 Live in Concert is a live album by the English band New Order. The album is an edited recording of the band's headline performance at Glastonbury CND Festival '87. It was first released as a live album in 1992. The live album charted at number thirty-three on the UK Albums Chart and was certified as Silver (60,000 units sold) by the BPI. The live album received mixed reviews and was first released as an LP, CD and Cassette in February 1992. The live album was released in June 2000 with new artwork by The Peter Saville Studio with photography by Jon Wozencroft. The original sleeve was designed by Mental Block.

The live album replicates the original broadcast recording by omitting four songs from the performance. "Elegia", "Ceremony", "Sub-culture" and "Sunrise" were also performed. The actual set-list was as follows: "Elegia", "Touched by the Hand of God", "Temptation", "True Faith", "Your Silent Face", "Every Little Counts", "Ceremony", "Bizarre Love Triangle", "Sub-culture", "Sunrise", "The Perfect Kiss", "Age of Consent" and "Sister Ray". The recording of "Elegia" was later included on the live disc of New Order's 2002 boxset Retro.

The set included the first public appearance of the song "True Faith", which would be released as a single the following month and go on to become one of the group's biggest and most enduringly popular hits.

== Track listing ==
All tracks are written by Bernard Sumner, Stephen Morris, Peter Hook and Gillian Gilbert; except where indicated.

No.	Title	Writer(s)	Length
1.	"Touched by the Hand of God"		4:58
2.	"Temptation"		8:36
3.	"True Faith"	Sumner, Morris, Hook, Gilbert, Stephen Hague	5:46
4.	"Your Silent Face"		6:05
5.	"Every Little Counts" (incorrectly titled Every Second Counts on packaging)		4:20
6.	"Bizarre Love Triangle"		4:39
7.	"Perfect Kiss"		10:06
8.	"Age of Consent"		5:20
9.	"Sister Ray"	Lou Reed, John Cale, Sterling Morrison, Maureen Tucker	9:21

== Personnel ==
New Order

- Gillian Gilbert - Keyboards, Guitar
- Peter Hook - Bass, Electronic drums
- Stephen Morris - Drums, Keyboards
- Bernard Sumner - Vocals, Guitar

Additional personnel

- Pete Ritzema - Producer
- Mental Block - Design (1992 release)
- The Peter Saville Studio - Design (2000 release)
- Jon Wozencroft - Photography
- Paul Lester - Liner Notes (2000 release)

== Chart positions ==
Chart (1993)	Peak position
UK Albums Chart	33
