= International (New Order album) =

Greatest hits album by New Order
- Released: 29 October 2002
- Recorded: 1981–2002
- Length: 77:38
- Label: London
- Producer: Various

New Order chronology
Get Ready (2001)	International (2002)	Retro (2002)

Professional ratings
Review scores
Source	Rating
AllMusic	4/5 stars

International is a greatest hits album by the English rock band New Order, released on 29 October 2002 by London Records.

== Background ==
It was released solely in certain countries—the United Kingdom notably excluded, although imports were available. Available editions include those from France with a limited-edition bonus CD and from the United States with a limited edition bonus DVD.

As it came out in the same year as the 4/5 disc Retro compilation, many New Order fans did not purchase International, particularly fans in countries where it was never sold.

One new track, the single "Here to Stay" from the 24 Hour Party People soundtrack, was, however, included on International, which was not on Retro, providing a possible incentive to those fans waiting for Retro.

On the limited edition bonus CD from the French edition, "Round & Round" is erroneously indicated as the "Kevin Saunderson 12″ version" (from the Round & Remix 12-inch single); it is in fact the Stephen Hague version from the Round & Round 12-inch single. This naming error was repeated on the digital music services only 2005 compilation album Best Remixes, and has never been corrected.

As of April 2006, the album had sold 62,000 copies in the United States, according to Nielsen SoundScan.

== Track listing ==
No.	Title	Length
1.	"Ceremony" (12″ version with Gillian Gilbert)	4:25
2.	"Blue Monday" (12″ version)	7:26
3.	"Confusion" (1987 mix version)	4:43
4.	"Thieves Like Us" (12″ version)	6:39
5.	"The Perfect Kiss" (Album version)	4:51
6.	"Shellshock" (John Robie 1987 Edit)	6:31
7.	"Bizarre Love Triangle" (Shep Pettibone Extended dance mix)	6:44
8.	"True Faith" (12″ version)	5:52
9.	"Touched by the Hand of God" (original 12″ version)	7:05
10.	"Round & Round" (7″ version)	4:01
11.	"Regret" (Album version)	4:11
12.	"Crystal" (Album version)	6:52
13.	"60 Miles an Hour" (Album version)	4:36
14.	"Here to Stay" (radio edit)	3:59

French limited edition bonus CD
No.	Title	Length
1.	"Temptation" (1987 version)	7:01
2.	"Lonesome Tonight"	5:12
3.	"Fine Time" (Silk Hurley remix)	6:17
4.	"Round & Round" (Kevin Saunderson 12″ mix)	6:50
5.	"Let's Go"	3:56

US limited edition bonus DVD
No.	Title	Length
1.	"Blue Monday" (live from 5/11)	7:21
2.	"True Faith"	5:03
3.	"The Perfect Kiss"	5:43

== Charts ==
Weekly chart performance for International
Chart (2002–2003)	Peak position
Australian Albums (ARIA)	109
French Albums (SNEP)	99
US Top Dance Albums (Billboard)	17
