= 12″ × 12 New Order Vinyl Campaign =

Remix album by New Order
- Released: 27 February 2006
- Recorded: 1981–2006
- Genre: House; techno
- Label: New State Recordings; NSER007 – NSER019
- Producer: New Order; Jim Spencer; Steve Osborne; Arthur Baker; John Robie; Martin Hannett; Stuart Price; John Leckie; The Chemical Brothers; Stephen Hague

New Order chronology
Singles (2005)	12″ × 12 New Order Vinyl Campaign (2006)	iTunes Originals – New Order (2007)

12″ × 12 New Order Vinyl Campaign is the title of a series of 12-inch singles released by New Order in February 2006 through New State Recordings. The discs contain a mixture of both new and previously released remixes of past New Order songs. NSER017, which contains mixes of "Blue Monday", including the original 1983 version mislabelled as 'Original 88 Version', charted in the UK top 75.

== Track listing ==
=== (NSER007) ===
A. "Waiting for the Sirens' Call" (Planet Funk Remix) – 7:25
B. "Waiting for the Sirens' Call" (Asle Dub) – 9:19

- Chart position: UK #186

=== (NSER008) ===
A. "Someone Like You" (James Holden Heavy Dub) – 10:00
B. "Someone Like You" (Funk D'Void Remix) – 9:56

- Chart position: UK #192

=== (NSER009) ===
A. "Confusion" (Koma & Bones Remix) – 8:55
B. "Crystal" (Lee Coombs Remix) – 8:44

- Chart position: UK #163

=== (NSER010) ===
A. "Confusion" (Pump Panel Reconstruction) – 10:11
B1. "Everything's Gone Green" (Dave Clarke Remix) – 5:12
B2. "Waiting for the Sirens' Call" (Filterheadz Remix) – 7:18

- Chart position: UK #142

=== (NSER011) ===
A. "Jetstream" (Phela Vocal Remix) – 8:59
B. "Someone Like You" (Future Shock Vocal) – 8:04

- Chart position: UK #204

=== (NSER012) ===
A1. "Krafty" (Riton Remix) – 6:54
A2. "Jetstream" (Tom Neville Dub) – 6:37
B1. "Krafty" (The Glimmers Dub) – 5:53

- Chart position: UK #203

=== (NSER014) ===
A. "Here to Stay" (Thee Extended Glitz Mix) – 8:09
B. "Jetstream" (Jacques Lu Cont Dub) – 8:31

- Chart position: UK #184

=== (NSER015) ===
A1. "Bizarre Love Triangle" (Shep Pettibone Remix) – 6:43
A2. "Round & Round" (Kevin Saunderson Remix) – 7:11
B1. "True Faith" (Shep Pettibone Remix) – 9:02
B2. "Fine Time" (Steve 'Silk' Hurley Remix) – 9:18

=== (NSER016) ===
A1. "True Faith" (King Roc Remix) – 8:18
B1. "Regret" (Tocadisco Remix) – 6:05
B2. "Regret" (Tocadisco Dub) – 5:44

- Chart position: UK #109

=== (NSER017) ===
A. "Blue Monday" (Original 88 Version) – 7:28
B. "Blue Monday" (Hardfloor Remix) – 8:35

- Chart position: UK #73

=== (NSER018) ===
A1. "Bizarre Love Triangle" (Richard X Remix) – 7:04
A2. "Jetstream" (Arthur Baker Remix) – 7:00
B1. "Shellshock" (John Robie Remix) – 6:30
B2. "Thieves Like Us" (12" Extended Mix) – 6:52

=== (NSER019) ===
A1. "Subculture" (Dub Vulture Mix) – 7:59
B1. "State of the Nation" (Shame of the Nation Mix) – 8:02
B2. "I Told You So" (Stuart Price's Remix) – 5:25

- Chart position: UK #180
