= The Best of New Order =

Greatest hits album by New Order
- Released: 21 November 1994
- Length: 69:55
- Label: London
- Producers: New Order; Stephen Hague; Arthur Baker; John Robie; Martin Hannett

New Order chronology
Republic (1993)	The Best of New Order (1994)	The Rest of New Order (1995)

Singles from (the best of) New Order
- 1. "True Faith-94" Released: 31 October 1994; 2. "1963-95" Released: 9 January 1995

The Best of New Order (stylised as (the best of) NewOrder) is a greatest hits album by English band New Order. It was released in the United Kingdom on 21 November 1994 by London Records and, with a different track listing, in the United States on 14 March 1995 by Qwest Records and Warner Bros. Records. Like Republic, the band's most recent studio album at the time, the cover and liner notes stylise the group's name as one word (NewOrder) instead of the usual New Order.

== Background ==
The Best of New Order is the second compilation album released by the group and follows their first, the hugely successful Substance album by seven years. The group had taken a hiatus due to tensions and disputes during the recording and touring of their 1993 album, Republic. Republic had been the first album that the group had released on London Records, and with the group announcing little intention of working together in the near future, the label went ahead compiling The Best of New Order.

The compilation primarily consists of seven-inch mixes of the group's singles from 1985 onwards. New versions of "True Faith", "Bizarre Love Triangle", "1963" and "Round & Round" appear in alternative mixes. The collection also includes one non-single track, "Vanishing Point" (from the LP Technique), though the song was already popularised as the theme tune to the BBC series Making Out. Only "Thieves Like Us" (the oldest track included, from 1984) appears in the same form as on the earlier compilation, Substance. The liner notes (first on a New Order album) were provided by journalist Paul Morley.

The US version of the album omits three tracks ("The Perfect Kiss", "Shellshock" and "Thieves Like Us"). This was purportedly due to the band's American label, Qwest, not wishing for some of the singles already included on Substance to be duplicated on this compilation. Instead, one album track from each of New Order's first three albums is included ("Dreams Never End" from Movement, "Age of Consent" from Power, Corruption & Lies, and "Love Vigilantes" from Low-Life), as well as a previously unreleased vocal version of the track "Let's Go (Nothing for Me)" from the 1987 film soundtrack Salvation!.

The following year, a companion remix album titled The Rest of New Order was released, with similar cover art.

== Release and reception ==
Professional ratings
Review scores
Source	Rating
AllMusic	5/5 stars
The Encyclopedia of Popular Music	5/5 stars
Entertainment Weekly	B+
The Village Voice	A

The Best of New Order was released on CD, cassette, double LP, VHS and Laserdisc. Limited editions bundled together the cassette and CD in a box set. Video and Laserdisc versions included singles that do not appear on other versions, namely "Confusion", "State of the Nation" and "Spooky".

Critical reception was generally positive. Although AllMusic's William Ruhlmann felt the American version was not as good a compilation as Substance (1987), he viewed the album as an exceptional overview of New Order's 1980s and early 1990s music. In his review for The Village Voice of the US edition, Robert Christgau said that the album shows why he prefers Bernard Sumner's impassive quality over the despairing Ian Curtis:

Where 1987's Substance showcased [their] music's remixed, interwoven glory, this pushes [Sumner's] mild-mannered vocals as far front as they'll go. Turns out he has normal feelings about love and rejection and such, dislikes war and guns without getting preachy—just super-unassumingly super-catchy, as befits Britannia's ranking pop group. I mean, could Blur or Oasis write a World Cup anthem so rousing, danceable, and informative?

The album sold well in the Christmas market and peaked at number four on the UK Albums Chart, and was certified Platinum by the British Phonographic Industry (BPI). Internationally, the compilation reached number 23 in Canada, number 27 in New Zealand, number 30 in Australia, and number 78 on the US Billboard 200. As of May 2006, it had sold 428,000 copies in the United States.

"True Faith-94" and "1963" were released as singles to promote the compilation. "True Faith-94" was released in November 1994, and reached number nine in the UK and number 11 in Ireland. "1963" (dubbed "1963–95") was remixed by Arthur Baker in a guitar-driven arrangement and released the following January; it reached number 21 in the UK and number 29 in Ireland.

== Track listing ==
All tracks are written by New Order, except where noted.

General Release
No.	Title	Writer(s)	Album	Length
1.	"True Faith-94"	New Order, Stephen Hague	Previously unreleased (Note: Original version released on Substance (1987))	5:34
2.	"Bizarre Love Triangle-94"	New Order	Previously unreleased (Note: Original version released on Brotherhood (1986))	3:54
3.	"1963-94"	New Order, Stephen Hague	Previously unreleased (Note: Original version released as the B-side to "True Faith" (1987))	3:46
4.	"Regret" (7" version)	New Order, Stephen Hague	Republic (1993)	4:08
5.	"Fine Time" (7" edit)	New Order	Technique (1989)	3:08
6.	"The Perfect Kiss" (Album version)	New Order	Low-Life (1985)	4:49
7.	"Shellshock" (7" version)	New Order, John Robie	Pretty in Pink (1986)	4:23
8.	"Thieves Like Us" (12" version)	New Order, Arthur Baker	non-album single (1984)	6:36
9.	"Vanishing Point" (Album version)	New Order	Technique	5:14
10.	"Run" (Incorrectly credited on UK editions as "Run 2", but is the album version)	New Order, John Denver	Technique	4:29
11.	"Round & Round-94"	New Order	Previously unreleased (Note: Original version released on Technique)	4:00
12.	"World (The Price of Love)" (Radio edit)	New Order, Stephen Hague	Republic	3:38
13.	"Ruined in a Day" (Radio edit)	New Order, Stephen Hague	Republic	3:57
14.	"Touched by the Hand of God" (7" version)	New Order	Salvation! (1988)	3:42
15.	"Blue Monday-88" (7" version)	New Order	non-album single (1988) (Note: Original version released as a non-album single (1983))	4:07
16.	"World in Motion" (Single version)	New Order, Keith Allen	non-album single (1990)	4:30
Total length:				69:55

US version
No.	Title	Writer(s)	Album	Length
1.	"Let's Go (Nothing for Me)"	New Order, Arthur Baker	Salvation!	4:02
2.	"Dreams Never End"	New Order	Movement (1981)	3:11
3.	"Age of Consent"	New Order	Power, Corruption & Lies (1983)	5:13
4.	"Love Vigilantes"	New Order	Low-Life	4:18
5.	"True Faith-94"	New Order, Stephen Hague	Previously unreleased	4:27
6.	"Bizarre Love Triangle-94"	New Order	Previously unreleased	3:54
7.	"1963–95" (Actually the Arthur Baker Radio Remix)	New Order, Stephen Hague	Previously unreleased	4:02
8.	"Fine Time"	New Order	Technique	3:08
9.	"Vanishing Point"	New Order	Technique	5:14
10.	"Run"	New Order, John Denver	Technique	4:28
11.	"Round & Round-94"	New Order	Previously unreleased	4:00
12.	"Regret"	New Order, Stephen Hague	Republic	4:08
13.	"World (The Price of Love)"	New Order	Republic	3:38
14.	"Ruined in a Day"	New Order	Republic	4:22
15.	"Touched by the Hand of God"	New Order	Salvation!	3:41
16.	"Blue Monday-88"	New Order	non-album single	4:07
17.	"World in Motion"	New Order, Keith Allen	non-album single	4:29
Total length:				70:22

== Video release ==
1. "True Faith-94"
2. "Regret"
3. "Run"
4. "Bizarre Love Triangle"
5. "Fine Time"
6. "The Perfect Kiss"
7. "Shellshock"
8. "Confusion"
9. "Blue Monday-88"
10. "Round & Round-94"
11. "World"
12. "Ruined in a Day"
13. "State of the Nation"
14. "Touched by the Hand of God"
15. "World in Motion"
16. "Spooky"
17. "True Faith"
18. "Round & Round" ("Patti" version)

== Personnel ==
- New Order – Production (All tracks except "Dreams Never End")
- Stephen Hague – Production ("True Faith-94", "1963", "Regret", "Ruined in a Day", "World (Price of Love)", and "World in Motion")
- Martin Hannett – Production ("Dreams Never End")
- Arthur Baker – Production ("Let's Go (Nothing for Me)")
- Mike "Spike" Drake – Production ("True Faith-94", "Bizarre Love Triangle-94", "1963–94" and "Round & Round-94")
- John Robie – Production ("Shellshock")
- Peter Saville – Design Consultant
- Howard Wakefield – Design
- Thomas Manss & Company – Design
- Martin Orpen and Idea – Digital Imaging

== Charts ==
Chart performance for The Best of New Order
Chart (1994–1995)	Peak position
Australian Albums (ARIA)	30
Canada Top Albums/CDs (RPM)	23
European Albums (Music & Media)	25
New Zealand Albums (RMNZ)	27
Scottish Albums (Official Charts)	6
UK Albums (Official Charts)	4
US Billboard 200	78

2026 chart performance for The Best of New Order
Chart (2026)	Peak position
Croatian International Albums (HDU)	15
Hungarian Physical Albums (MAHASZ)	21
