= In Session =

In Session may refer to:

- In Session (Albert King and Stevie Ray Vaughan album), 1999
- In Session (Lisa Stansfield album), 1996
- In Session (New Order album), 2004
- Glen Campbell and Jimmy Webb: In Session, 2012
- In Session, a weekdaily news block at Tru TV which provides coverage of trials and legal news
