= In Session (New Order album) =

Compilation album by New Order
- Released: 14 April 2004
- Recorded: 24 September 1998 (1–5); 17 October 2001 (6–9); 2002 (10)
- Genre: Rock
- Length: 47:44
- Label: Strange Fruit - SFRSCD128
- Producer: Miti Adhikari

New Order chronology
Retro (2002)	In Session (2004)	Waiting for the Sirens' Call (2005)

Professional ratings
Review scores
Source	Rating
BBC Online	Positive
Pitchfork	8.3/10

In Session is a compilation album of two BBC Radio 1 sessions by the English band New Order, released in 2004. The first five tracks were recorded in 1998 for the John Peel radio show. These songs mark the group's third John Peel session. Tracks 6 to 9 were recorded for the BBC Radio 1 Evening Session in 2001. "Transmission" is a video recorded in 2002 for John Peel's 40th anniversary party.

The session tracks were produced by Miti Adhikari. The artwork was designed by the group's longtime collaborator Peter Saville with photography by Jon Wozencroft.

== Track listing ==
All tracks are written by Gillian Gilbert, Peter Hook, Stephen Morris and Bernard Sumner; except where indicated.

No.	Title	Writer(s)	Length
1.	"True Faith"	Gilbert, Hook, Morris, Sumner, Stephen Hague	5:35
2.	"Isolation"	Ian Curtis, Hook, Morris, Sumner	2:44
3.	"Touched"		4:39
4.	"Atmosphere"	Curtis, Hook, Morris, Sumner	4:30
5.	"Paradise"		4:08
6.	"Slow Jam"		5:22
7.	"Your Silent Face"		6:01
8.	"Close Range"		5:01
9.	"Rock the Shack"		5:24
10.	"Transmission" (video)	Curtis, Hook, Morris, Sumner	4:01

== Personnel ==
New Order

- Phil Cunningham - guitar and keyboards (6–9)
- Gillian Gilbert - keyboards (1–5)
- Peter Hook - bass
- Stephen Morris - drums
- Bernard Sumner - vocals, guitar

Additional personnel

- Dawn Zee - backing vocals (8)
- Bobby Gillespie - backing vocals (9)
- Miti Adhikari - producer
- George Thomas - engineer (1–5)
- Guy Worth - engineer (6–9)
- Miles Prowse - filming (10)
- Peter Saville Studio - design
- Jon Wozencroft - photography
