= 12×12 =

12x12 may refer to:

- 12×12=144, a common times tables size in the English-speaking world
- Twelve wheel drive (12x12), a vehicle configuration with 12 wheels, all of them drive wheels
- Twelve Steps and Twelve Traditions a book published by Alcoholics Anonymous World Services
- 12"x12 New Order Vinyl Campaign, a series of 12 12-inch single gramophone records
- 12x12 Original Remixes Talk Talk
- Barah x Barah, a 2024 Indian film
