= North American tour =

North American tour may refer to:

- Kylie Minogue's 2009 North American tour
- North American Tour 2012 (New Order), a concert tour by New Order
- North American Tour 2013, a concert tour by Kesha and Pitbull
