= The Rest of New Order =

Remix album by New Order
- Released: 21 August 1995
- Recorded: 1981–1995
- Length: 80:00
- Label: London
- Producers: New Order; Stephen Hague; Martin Hannett; Arthur Baker; John Robie

New Order chronology
The Best of New Order (1994)	The Rest of New Order (1995)	Get Ready (2001)

Singles from The Rest of New Order
- 1. "Blue Monday-95" Released: 24 July 1995

Professional ratings
Review scores
Source	Rating
AllMusic	3/5 stars
Muzik	3/5 stars

The Rest of New Order (stylised as (the rest of) NewOrder) is a remix album by English band New Order, released on 21 August 1995 by London Records.

== Commercial performance ==
The album reached number five on the UK Albums Chart and number 41 on the Swedish Albums Chart. To promote the album, "Blue Monday" was once again re-released, both its original 1983 version as well as several new remixes, packaged in different combinations across several simultaneously released singles all titled Blue Monday-95, as well on as a free bonus CD (also titled Blue Monday-95) which was included with a limited edition release of The Rest of New Order. The version included on the album and most prominently featured on the singles was the Hardfloor Mix; it reached number 17 in the United Kingdom, number 29 in Ireland, number 38 in Sweden and number 54 in Germany.

== Track listing ==
All tracks are written by New Order, except where noted.

Standard CD version
No.	Title	Writer(s)	Remixer(s)	Length
1.	"World" (Perfecto mix)	New Order; Stephen Hague	Paul Oakenfold; Steve Osborne	7:27
2.	"Blue Monday" (Hardfloor mix)		Hardfloor	8:35
3.	"True Faith" (Shep Pettibone remix)	New Order; Hague	Shep Pettibone	9:02
4.	"Confusion" (Pump Panel Reconstruction mix)	New Order; Arthur Baker	The Pump Panel	10:12
5.	"Touched by the Hand of God" (Biff & Memphis remix)		Biff Stannard; Matt Rowe	10:00
6.	"Bizarre Love Triangle" (Armand van Helden mix)		Armand van Helden	8:59
7.	"Ruined in a Day" (K-Klass remix)	New Order; Hague	K-Klass	6:13
8.	"Regret" (Fire Island remix)	New Order; Hague	Fire Island	7:07
9.	"Age of Consent" (Howie B remix)		Howie B	5:23
10.	"Spooky" (Magimix)	New Order; Hague	Fluke	6:58

Standard cassette version
No.	Title	Writer(s)	Remixer(s)	Length
1.	"World" (Perfecto mix)	New Order; Hague		7:27
2.	"Blue Monday" (Hardfloor mix)			8:35
3.	"True Faith" (Shep Pettibone remix)	New Order; Hague		9:02
4.	"Confusion" (Pump Panel Reconstruction mix)	New Order; Baker		10:12
5.	"Touched by the Hand of God" (Biff & Memphis remix)			10:00
6.	"Bizarre Love Triangle" (Armand van Helden mix)			8:59
7.	"Everything's Gone Green" (Dave Clarke remix)		Dave Clarke	5:31
8.	"Ruined in a Day" (K-Klass remix)	New Order; Hague		6:13
9.	"Regret" (Fire Island remix)	New Order; Hague		7:07
10.	"Temptation" (CJ Bolland remix)		C. J. Bolland	7:41
11.	"Age of Consent" (Howie B remix)			5:23

LP version
No.	Title	Length
1.	"Blue Monday" (Hardfloor mix)	8:35
2.	"Age of Consent" (Howie B remix)	5:23
3.	"Bizarre Love Triangle" (Armand van Helden mix)	8:59
4.	"Everything's Gone Green" (Dave Clarke remix)	5:31
5.	"Touched by the Hand of God" (Biff & Memphis remix)	10:00
6.	"Temptation" (CJ Bolland remix)	7:41

Limited edition bonus disc/cassette
No.	Title	Remixer(s)	Length
1.	"Blue Monday" (original 12″ mix (Note: Omits the first two bars of the original version.))		7:26
2.	"Blue Monday" (Hardfloor vocal mix (Note: Identical to the mix on the main album.))	Hardfloor	8:36
3.	"Blue Monday" (Andrea mix)	Jam & Spoon	8:27
4.	"Beach Buggy (Note: Incorrectly listed as "Blue Monday (88 version)".)"	Michael Johnson	6:51
5.	"Blue Monday" (Hawtin mix)	Richie Hawtin	8:02
6.	"Blue Monday" (Manuella mix)	Jam & Spoon	7:31
7.	"Blue Monday" (Starwash mix)	Starwash	5:39
8.	"Blue Monday" (Plutone mix)	Plutone	6:30

== Personnel ==
- New Order – production
- Stephen Hague – production ("World", "True Faith", "Ruined in a Day", "Regret", "Spooky")
- Arthur Baker – production ("Confusion")
- John Robie – production ("Confusion")
- Martin Hannett – production ("Everything's Gone Green")
- Peter Saville – art direction
- Howard Wakefield – design
- Martin Orpen and Idea – digital imaging
- Trevor Key – photography

== Charts ==
Chart performance for The Rest of New Order
Chart (1995)	Peak position
Australian Albums (ARIA)	114
European Albums (Music & Media)	41
Scottish Albums (Official Charts)	15
Swedish Albums (Sverigetopplistan)	41
UK Albums (Official Charts)	5

2026 chart performance for The Rest of New Order
Chart (2026)	Peak position
Croatian International Albums (HDU)	14
