= Miranda Sawyer =

British journalist (born 1967)

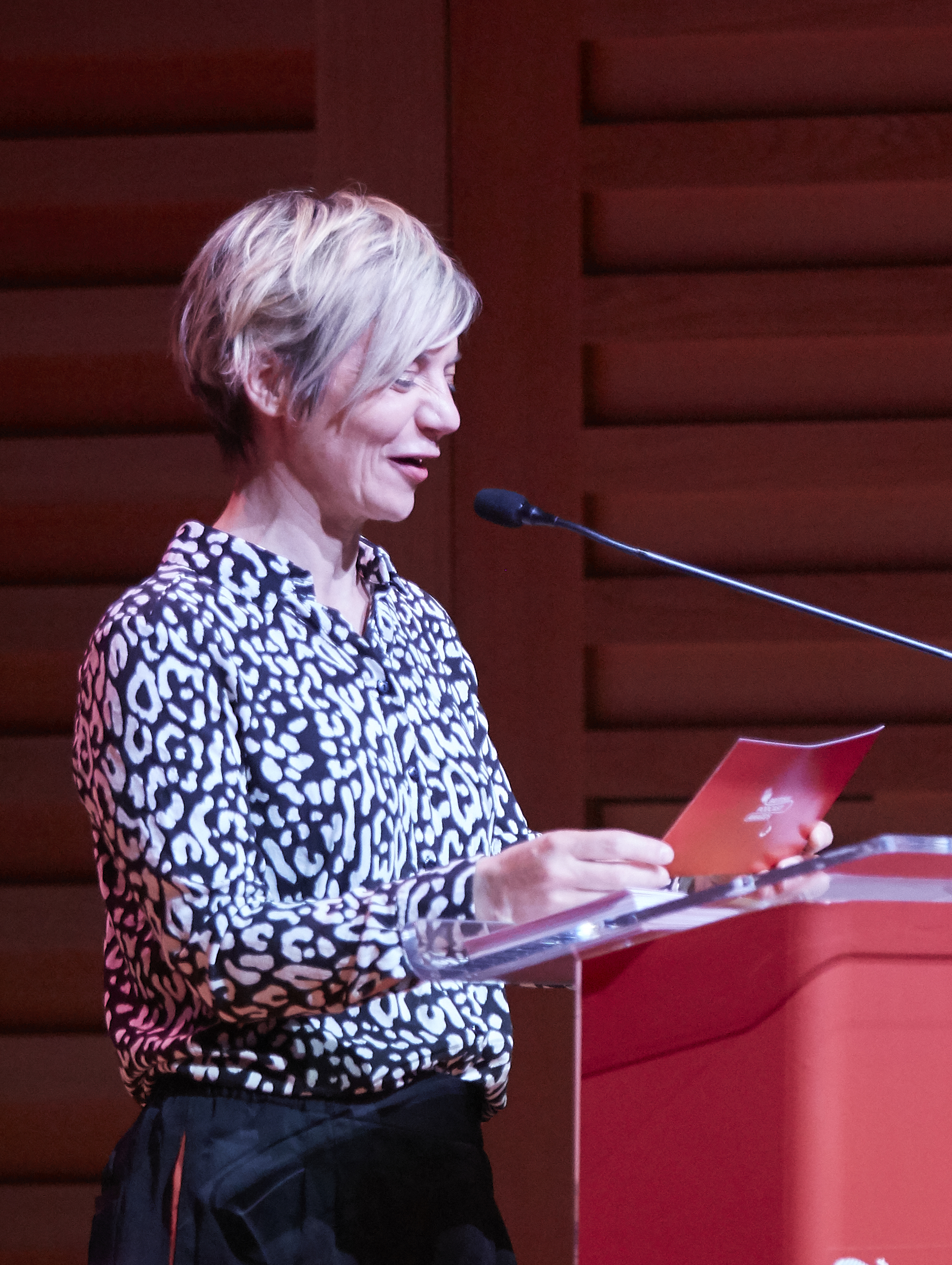
- Sawyer at the 2018 British Podcast Awards
- Born: Miranda Caroline Sawyer; 7 January 1967 (age 59); Bristol, England
- Education: Cheadle Hulme School; University of Oxford (BA)
- Occupation: Journalist
- Employers: Smash Hits; Select; Time Out; Daily Mirror; Mixmag; The Face; The Guardian
- Spouse: Michael Smiley (m. 2007)
- Children: 2
- Website: mirandasawyer.com

Miranda Caroline Sawyer (born 7 January 1967) is an English author, journalist and broadcaster.

== Education and early life ==
Sawyer was born in Bristol and grew up in Wilmslow, Cheshire, with her brother Toby, who is an actor. Sawyer was educated at Cheadle Hulme School, a private school in Stockport, and was awarded a Bachelor of Arts (BA) degree in Jurisprudence from the University of Oxford, where she was an undergraduate student of Pembroke College, Oxford.

== Career ==
Sawyer moved to London in 1988 to begin a career as a journalist with the magazine Smash Hits. In 1993, she became the youngest winner of the Periodical Publishers Association Magazine Writer of the Year award for her work on Select magazine. She wrote columns for Time Out (1993–96) and the Daily Mirror (2000–2003), and was a frequent contributor to Mixmag and The Face during the 1990s.

In 2002, Sawyer was one of the curators of New Order's box set Retro, compiling the Pop disc and contributing sleeve notes to the release.

As of August 2021, Sawyer is a feature writer for The Guardian and The Observer and serves as a radio critic. Her work has been published in GQ, Vogue and The Guardian and she is a regular arts critic in print, on television and on radio. She served as a member of the judging panel for the 2007 Turner Prize and the panel that awarded Liverpool its European Capital of Culture status in 2008.

In 2004, Sawyer wrote, researched and presented an hour-long documentary for Channel 4 about the age of consent; in 2003, she wrote an article for The Observer, entitled Sex is not just for grown-ups, in which she argued for the age of consent to be reduced to 12. In 2007, she presented a highly personal documentary for More4 on abortion rights in the US, A Matter of Life and Death, as part of its Travels with My Camera strand.

Sawyer interviewed Russell Brand for The Guardian in the aftermath of the Russell Brand Show prank calls row.

She has been an occasional guest on the UK arts programme Newsnight Review and The Culture Show on BBC Two, and also BBC Radio 2 and BBC Radio 6 Music's Radcliffe and Maconie Show. She also took part in a celebrity edition of BBC Two's afternoon quiz show The Weakest Link.

Her first book Park and Ride, a travel book on the Great British suburbs, was published by Little, Brown and Company in 1999. Her second book Out of Time on the midlife crisis was published by HarperCollins in 2016. Her third book Uncommon People on the history of Britpop was published by Hachette in 2024.

== Personal life ==
Sawyer married the Belfast-born comedian and actor Michael Smiley in 2007. The couple have two children. In 2014, she appeared in The Life of Rock with Brian Pern as herself.
