= The Peel Sessions (New Order album) =

Compilation album by New Order
- Released: 27 September 1986 (The Peel Sessions 1982); 5 December 1987 (The Peel Sessions 1981); September 1990 (Album); 13 November 2000 (Album re-issue)
- Recorded: 26 January 1981 (1–4), 1982 (5–8)
- Genre: Post-punk
- Length: 20:18 (The Peel Sessions 1982); 17:19 (The Peel Sessions 1981); 37:37 (Album)
- Label: Strange Fruit - SFRLP110

New Order chronology
Technique (1989)	The Peel Sessions (1986)	BBC Radio 1 Live in Concert (1992)

Professional ratings
Review scores
Source	Rating
Allmusic	4/5 stars

The Peel Sessions is the name of two extended plays and a subsequent compilation album released by the English band New Order.

== Overview ==
Peel Sessions (later re-released as The John Peel Sessions in 2000) was the 1990 album release of the sessions New Order recorded in January 1981 and June 1982 for Radio 1's John Peel Show. Each session had previously been released as four-track EPs in 1986 (The Peel Sessions 1982) and 1987 (The Peel Sessions 1981).

"Truth", "Senses", "I.C.B." and "Dreams Never End" (recorded 26 January 1981) would be later recorded with Martin Hannett and released on Movement. The production and arrangements differ notably from those on the album. New Order would later dismiss Movement due to Hannett's style. In common with the album, the lead vocals on "Dreams Never End" were by bassist Peter Hook.

The 1982 session caught the band still in search of a new musical direction. "We All Stand" and "5-8-6" appeared on the subsequent album Power, Corruption & Lies. The songs "Too Late" and "Turn the Heater On", the latter a Keith Hudson reggae cover, were only ever recorded for the Peel session, and neither were ever performed live. "Turn the Heater On" was known to be one of Ian Curtis's favourite songs‚ and it was for this reason that New Order recorded their version as a tribute to him. Ian's admiration of reggae artists, such as Keith Hudson and Toots and the Maytals, is mentioned by his wife Deborah Curtis in her book Touching From a Distance. These tracks were broadcast on 1 June 1982, though were presumably recorded in spring 1982.

New Order went on to record a third John Peel Session in November 1998, and a further session for BBC radio with the Evening Session in October 2001. These later sessions were collected together and released in 2004 by Strange Fruit records as In Session.

== Track listing ==
- All tracks written by New Order, except where noted.

Side one
No.	Title	Length
1.	"Truth"	4:21
2.	"Senses"	4:25
3.	"I.C.B."	5:19
4.	"Dreams Never End"	3:13

Side two
No.	Title	Writer(s)	Length
5.	"Turn the Heater On"	Keith Hudson	5:03
6.	"We All Stand"		5:26
7.	"Too Late"		3:39
8.	"5-8-6"		6:08

== Personnel ==
Personnel adapted from The Peel Sessions liner notes.

New Order

- Peter Hook – bass, vocals
- Bernard Sumner (credited as Bernard Dicken) – guitar, vocals
- Gillian Gilbert – guitar, synthesiser
- Stephen Morris – drums

Technical personnel

- Tony Wilson – production (tracks 1–4)
- New Order – production (tracks 5–8)

== Chart positions ==
The Peel Sessions 1982 (EP)

Chart (1986)	Peak position
UK Singles Chart	54
UK Independent Singles Chart	2

The Peel Sessions 1981 (EP)

Chart (1987)	Peak position
UK Singles Chart	95
UK Independent Singles Chart	5
