= Elegia (song) =

- 2012 reissue cover

Instrumental by New Order

from the album Low-Life
- Released: 13 May 1985
- Recorded: 1984
- Studio: Jam and Britannia Row Studios, London
- Genre: Electronica; ambient; post-rock
- Length: 4:56 (album version); 17:29 (full length version)
- Label: Factory; Slow to Speak (reissue)
- Songwriters: Peter Hook; Gillian Gilbert; Stephen Morris; Bernard Sumner
- Producer: New Order

Official audio
- "Elegia" (2015 Remaster) on YouTube

"Elegia" is an instrumental composed and performed by the English rock band New Order. It was released as the fifth track on their third studio album, Low-Life (1985). The track was written and produced by Gillian Gilbert, Peter Hook, Stephen Morris and Bernard Sumner.

"Elegia" was written as a tribute to Joy Division frontman Ian Curtis. The band had originally dissolved as a result of Curtis' suicide, after which the surviving members would later form New Order.

The song has appeared in several pieces of media, including Pretty in Pink, Stranger Things, Deadly Class, The Crown, and Boots.

== Background and recording ==
"Elegia" was originally written for a film commissioned by i-D magazine. The song was inspired by Ennio Morricone's For A Few Dollars More score. The film was never made, causing "Elegia" to be cut down for inclusion on Low-Life.

"Elegia" was recorded at CTS Studios in Wembley during a single 24-hour session, where it went under the working title "Ben and Justin". The song uses the E-mu Emulator II for several of its sounds, including its synth choir and strings.

== Full length version ==
The original recording of "Elegia" had a duration of 17:29, which was edited down to 4:56 for the album version on Low-Life. The full version was first featured on the 2002 5-CD box set Retro, which had become rare over time. It was also included on the 2008 Collector's Edition reissue of Low-Life. As a result, the song was reissued as a twelve-inch EP in 2012 through the record label Slow To Speak. This EP had two additional tracks: "5 8 6", as it was featured on the Peel Sessions compilation album, as well as the song "The Him", originally from New Order's debut studio album, Movement (1981); the latter track is also dedicated to Curtis. The full version of "Elegia" was once again featured on the Definitive Edition reissue of Low-Life in 2022.

== Track listing ==
Track listing adapted from the 2012 reissue.

| No. | Title | Length |
|---|---|---|
| 1. | "Elegia" (Full Length Version) | 17:29 |
| 2. | "5-8-6" (Peel Session) | 6:08 |
| 3. | "The Him" | 5:30 |
| Total length: | | 29:05 |

== Appearances in media ==
Since the release of Low-Life in 1985, "Elegia" has been used in the following media productions:

- The 1998 Academy Award-nominated short film More by Mark Osborne.
- The 1986 film Pretty in Pink.
- The CSI: Crime Scene Investigation episode "Compulsion".
- An American Masters documentary about writer Truman Capote, first aired in September 1987.
- The fifth episode of the first season of the Netflix series Stranger Things.
- Comedian Sam Hyde used it for the trailer to his web series "Kickstarter TV".
- "Rust" – a black-and-white music video by Nenko Genov.
- The E3 2015 trailer of the video game Metal Gear Solid V: The Phantom Pain.
- The first episode of the show "Deadly Class (TV series)".
- The Crown season 4 episode "The Heredity Principle".
- Boots season 1 episode "The Things We Carry".
