= Salvation! =

1987 film by Scott B and Beth B

- Theatrical release poster
- Directed by: Beth B
- Screenplay by: Beth B Tom Robinson
- Produced by: Beth B Michael H. Shamberg
- Starring: Stephen McHattie; Dominique Davalos; Exene Cervenka; Viggo Mortensen; Rockets Redglare
- Cinematography: Francis Kenny
- Edited by: Elizabeth Kling
- Music by: New Order a.o.
- Distributed by: Circle Films
- Release date: May 31, 1987 (New York City)
- Running time: 80 minutes
- Country: United States
- Language: English

Salvation! (also known as Salvation!: Have You Said Your Prayers Today?) is a 1987 American black comedy film directed by Beth B, and starring Stephen McHattie, Exene Cervenka and Viggo Mortensen. The film is a parody of televangelism, and was released right after the real-life Jim Bakker and Jimmy Swaggart scandals.

In the film, a televangelist in Staten Island has a one-night-stand with a woman during a rainstorm. He then finds himself accused of sexual assault by the woman's brother-in-law, and is pressured into entering a working relationship with his lover's sister. The televangelist finds himself increasingly dominated by his new business partner, and keeps giving in to her demands.

== Plot ==
Reverend Randall (Stephen McHattie) is a Staten Island-based televangelist who has been bilking his flock and secretly watches pornography while he is rehearsing his sermons in his stately home. Cervenka plays Rhonda Stample, a born again Christian who watches his programs and regularly sends him money, to the irritation of Rhonda's non-believer husband, Jerome (Viggo Mortensen).

Shortly after Jerome loses his factory job, his sister in-law Lenore (Dominique Davalos) comes to Rev. Randall's home in a rainstorm, claiming car trouble. He reluctantly lets her in, and the two take turns seducing and then retreating from each other, until they finally engage in violent sex. Jerome shows up later that evening, along with two boorish neighbors, and beat him for what they believe is an unwanted encounter with Lenore.

All of them contemplate the possibilities of blackmail against him with a sex scandal, but Randall manages to escape his home. That morning, he is picked up hitchhiking by Rhonda, who pitches him on the notion of bringing her into his ministry. In order to avert the intentions of her husband and sister, he agrees to her idea.

Later, Rhonda's addition to Randall's program has become a huge success, with Jerome, Lenore, and the neighbors all enjoying a higher standard of living. But Rhonda gets drunk with power, and makes increasing demands on Randall, first to boot all the other parties from their ministry, and then for a bigger share of their proceeds. Randall resists the latter option, but ultimately gives in. The film finishes with Rhonda performing a heavy-metal inspired song of faith, "Destroy All Evil", with imagery associated with tropes of the musical style.

== Soundtrack ==
The soundtrack album was released on Factory Benelux/Les Disques du Crépuscule (catalogue TWI-774) and Factory Australasia (catalogue FACT-182) in February 1988.

=== Track listing ===
Salvation! (Original Soundtrack)

Soundtrack album by various artists
- Released: 1988
- Genres: Alternative rock; post-punk; electronic
- Labels: Giant Records; Les Disques du Crépuscule; Factory Australasia
- Producer: Various

Singles from Salvation! (Original Soundtrack)
- 1. "Salvation!"/"You Can't Blackmail Jesus" Released: October 1987; 2. "Touched by the Hand of God" Released: 7 December 1987

Side A:

1. New Order: "Salvation Theme" - 2:14
2. Jumpin' Jesus (Arthur Baker and Stuart Kimball, vocals by Stephen McHattie): "You Can't Blackmail Jesus" - 4:26
3. Cabaret Voltaire: "Twanky Party" - 4:17
4. New Order: "Touched by the Hand of God" - 5:02
5. Dominique* (Dominique Davalos): "Play The Beat" - 3:24
6. The Hood: "Nightmare" - 1:54

Side B:

1. New Order: "Let's Go" - 3:44
2. The Hood: "Salvation! Have You Said Your Prayers Today" - 4:10
3. Arthur Baker: "Come On" - 2:45
4. New Order: "Sputnik" - 2:31
5. Cabaret Voltaire: "Jesus Saves" - 4:02
6. New Order: "Skullcrusher" - 2:52
7. Dominique*: "Destroy All Evil" - 3:33

=== Charts ===
Chart (1988)	Peak position
Australia (Kent Music Report)	86
