= 1963 (song) =

1987 song by New Order

Song by New Order
- A-side: "True Faith"
- Released: 20 July 1987
- Length: 5:32
- Label: Factory
- Songwriters: Bernard Sumner; Peter Hook; Stephen Morris; Gillian Gilbert; Stephen Hague
- Producers: Stephen Hague; New Order

"1963"
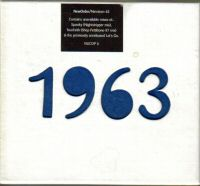

Single by New Order

from the album The Best of New Order
- Released: 9 January 1995
- Length: 5:05
- Label: London
- Songwriters: Bernard Sumner; Peter Hook; Stephen Morris; Gillian Gilbert; Stephen Hague
- Producers: Stephen Hague; New Order

New Order singles chronology
"True Faith-94" (1994)	"1963" (1995)	"Blue Monday-95" (1995)

Music video
- "1963" on YouTube

"1963" (sometimes stylized as "Nineteen63") is a track by English rock group New Order. It was originally released as a B-side to "True Faith" in 1987 and appeared on the Substance compilation of the same year. It was then released as a single in January 1995, in a radio mix by Arthur Baker.

"1963"'s B-sides are all remixes of the title track or songs previously released.

== Lyrics ==
In New Order Music 1981–89, the band's lyricist Bernard Sumner writes a tongue-in-cheek account of the song's lyrics that relate it to the 1963 assassination of John F. Kennedy. Sumner facetiously theorises that Kennedy arranged for Lee Harvey Oswald to shoot his wife so that "J.F. could do one with M. Monroe". Monroe commits suicide when Oswald hits the wrong target (in reality, Marilyn Monroe died in 1962, over a year before the assassination took place) and Oswald is later shot by his boss (implied to be Jack Ruby), for "doing such a bad job and causing his hit-man business to go bust."

The producer Stephen Hague has referred to the song as "the only song about domestic violence that you can dance to."

== Versions ==
The original 1987 version ended in a fade-out while repeating the last line of the outro, "I will always feel free". The "94 album mix", also included on the international edition of (The Best of) New Order as "1963-94", had all new orchestration and is similar in structure to the original version, except that the outro is removed and replaced with a repeat of the final bridge and chorus, faded out. The 1995 Arthur Baker remix restores the original outro, and, instead of fading out, has a cold ending after four repeats of the last line.

An alternate mix of "1963-94" appeared on the 2005 Singles compilation, while the 2016 re-release of Singles features the Arthur Baker remix.

== Music video ==
The video for the single's release, featuring the "95 Arthur Baker Radio remix", was directed by Gina Birch and produced by Michael H. Shamberg. It depicts British comic actress Jane Horrocks waking up in a box in the countryside and walking to the city. Jane's suitcase becomes bigger in each camera take, eventually growing to the size of the box she initially emerged from before she climbs inside.

== Track listings ==
All tracks are written by Gillian Gilbert, Stephen Hague, Peter Hook, Stephen Morris and Bernard Sumner; except where indicated.

CD #1: NUOCD6 (UK & Europe)
No.	Title	Length
1.	"1963" (95 Arthur Baker radio remix) (remixed by Arthur Baker)	4:04
2.	"1963" (94 album version)	3:47
3.	"1963" (Lionrock Full Throttle mix) (remixed by Justin Robertson)	7:50
4.	"1963" (Joe T. Vanelli dubby mix) (remixed by Joe T. Vanelli)	7:13

CD #2: NUCDP6 (UK & Europe) – limited edition
No.	Title	Writer(s)	Length
1.	"1963" (95 Arthur Baker remix)		5:05
2.	"Let's Go" (a new 'vocal' version of "Let's Go" produced in 1994 by Bernard Sumner and Arthur Baker)	Gilbert, Hook, Morris, Sumner	3:56
3.	"Spooky" (Nightstripper mix) (remixed by Tony Garcia and Peter Daou)		7:03
4.	"True Faith" (87 Shep Pettibone remix) (remixed by Shep Pettibone)		9:02

7": NUO 6 / cassette: NUOMC 6 (UK & Europe)
No.	Title	Length
1.	"1963" (95 Arthur Baker radio remix)	4:04
2.	"1963" (94 album version)	3:47

12": NUOX6 (UK & Europe)
No.	Title	Length
1.	"1963" (Joe T. Vanelli dubby mix)	7:13
2.	"1963" (Joe T. Vanelli light mix)	8:59
3.	"1963" (Lionrock Full Throttle mix)	7:50
4.	"1963" (Lionrock M6 Sunday Morning mix)	6:25

== Charts ==
Chart (1995)	Peak position
Ireland (IRMA)	29
UK Singles (OCC)	21
UK Dance (OCC)	20

== See also ==
- John F. Kennedy assassination conspiracy theories
