= Isolation (Joy Division song) =

1980 song by Joy Division

Song by Joy Division

from the album Closer
- Released: 18 July 1980
- Recorded: 18–30 March 1980
- Studio: Britannia Row (London)
- Genre: New wave; electronic rock
- Length: 2:52
- Label: Factory
- Songwriters: Bernard Sumner; Peter Hook; Stephen Morris; Ian Curtis
- Producers: Martin Hannett; Joy Division

"Isolation" is a song by the English rock band Joy Division. It appears on their second and final studio album Closer (1980). The song is based on an electronic drum beat by Stephen Morris, accompanied by a thin, trebly keyboard part by Bernard Sumner. Midway through the song, a rushing drum and hi-hat motif come in, propelling the song toward its dramatic end.

== Composition ==
"Isolation" is a new wave and synth-rock song, which "temporarily lifts the album's post-punk cloud." It contains elements of synth-pop and electronic music and lasts for a duration of two minutes and fifty-two seconds. According to the sheet music published at Musicnotes.com by Universal Music Publishing Group, the song is written in the time signature of common time, with a tempo of 148 beats per minute. "Isolation" is played in the key of C major, while Ian Curtis's vocal range spans one octave, from the low-note of B_{3} to the high-note of B_{4}. The song has a basic sequence of G–F–G in the verses, changes to B–A–G–F–G at the chorus and follows G–F–G–G–G during the coda as its chord progression.

Bassist Peter Hook said the ending came as the serendipitous result of Martin Hannett's efforts to rescue the original master tape from a botched edit by a junior sound engineer.

== Critical reception ==
AllMusic's Ned Raggett complimented "Isolation," writing, "the song structure and delivery is all Joy Division and as such makes the song an intriguing twist on a style and a highlight of the excellent Closer album."

== Personnel ==
- Ian Curtis – vocals
- Bernard Sumner – synthesizer
- Peter Hook – bass guitar
- Stephen Morris – electronic drums

== Cover versions ==
The song has been covered many times, including versions by:

- New Order played an electronic-based cover in a Peel Session in 1998, released on the compilation album In Session (2004).
- Northern Irish rock band Therapy? covered the song on their second studio album Troublegum (1994). This version also incorporates elements from "Atrocity Exhibition".
- In 1995, a cover version by the Smashing Pumpkins spin-off band Starchildren appeared on the tribute album A Means to an End: The Music of Joy Division.
- Industrial band Dessau released the Al Jourgensen produced 12" single in late 1988.
- 26 April 2020, Canadian rock band the Tea Party released a newly recorded cover to coincide with the COVID-19 pandemic and the isolation orders that much of the world is under to stop the spread of the virus.
- 18 May 2020, Mark Lanegan and Cold Cave released their cover of the song.

== Sources ==
- Curtis, Deborah. "Touching from a Distance: Ian Curtis and Joy Division". London: Faber & Faber, 2005. ISBN 978-0-5712-2481-4
- Hook, Peter. "Unknown Pleasures: Inside Joy Division". London: Simon & Schuster, 2012. ISBN 978-0-8572-0215-4
- Bernard, Sumner. "Chapter and Verse - New Order, Joy Division and Me". Corgi, 2015. ISBN 978-0-5521-7049-9
