= Age of Consent (song) =

Song by New Order

from the album Power, Corruption & Lies
- Released: May 2, 1983
- Recorded: March 1982
- Studio: Britannia Row, London
- Genre: New wave; dance-rock; jangle pop; post-punk
- Length: 5:15
- Label: Factory
- Songwriters: Bernard Sumner; Peter Hook; Stephen Morris; Gillian Gilbert
- Producer: New Order

Music video
- "Age of Consent" on YouTube

"Age of Consent" is a song by the English rock band New Order. It appears as the opening track on their second studio album, Power, Corruption & Lies (1983).

== Composition ==
Stephen Morris revealed during a 2020 Twitter listening party that his drum beats were based on the Martin Hannett version of Joy Division's "Love Will Tear Us Apart".

== Live performances ==
As of May 2024, the song has been played 287 times in concert by the band, making its live debut on August 30, 1982. It returned to live performances in 2011, following a 22-year absence from set lists, having last been played live in 1989.

== Personnel ==
- Bernard Sumner – vocals, guitars
- Peter Hook – 4- and 6-stringed bass
- Stephen Morris – drums, percussion
- Gillian Gilbert – synthesisers and programming
- New Order – production
- Michael Johnson – engineering
- Barry Sage and Mark Boyne – assistants

== Certifications ==
| Region | Certification | Certified units/sales |
|---|---|---|
| United Kingdom (BPI) | Silver | 200,000^{‡} |
^{‡} Sales+streaming figures based on certification alone.

== Cover versions ==
"Age of Consent" has been covered by numerous bands, including Arcade Fire, Geographer, The Essex Green, Buffalo Tom, and Built to Spill. Cayetana provided a cover of "Age of Consent" for the soundtrack to the 2018 film To All the Boys I've Loved Before. Geographer's cover appeared in the 2024 film Snack Shack.

== Remixes ==
A remix of the song by record producer Howie B was created for the 1995 compilation album The Rest of New Order.
