= Here to Stay (New Order song) =

Single by New Order

from the album 24 Hour Party People (Soundtrack)
- B-side: "Player in the League"
- Released: 15 April 2002
- Recorded: 2002
- Genre: Alternative dance
- Length: 4:58; 3:57 (single version)
- Label: London
- Songwriters: Bernard Sumner; Stephen Morris; Gillian Gilbert; Peter Hook
- Producers: The Chemical Brothers, New Order

New Order singles chronology
"Someone Like You" (2002)	"Here to Stay" (2002)	"Krafty" (2005)

"Here to Stay" is the twenty-eighth single by English band New Order and produced by the electronic music duo The Chemical Brothers. It was released as a single in 2002, and reached number 15 in the UK Singles Chart.

The track was originally slated for inclusion on Get Ready, but was dropped.

== Track listing ==
All tracks are written by New Order.

CD #1: NUOCD11 (UK & Europe)
No.	Title	Length
1.	"Here to Stay" (radio edit)	3:55
2.	"Here to Stay" (full-length vocal)	5:00
3.	"Player in the League"	5:35

CD #2: NUCDP11 (UK & Europe)
No.	Title	Length
1.	"Here to Stay" (radio edit)	3:55
2.	"Here to Stay" (Felix da Housecat - Thee Extended Glitz Mix)	8:08
3.	"Here to Stay" (The Scumfrog - Dub Mix)	8:01

CD: 0927 458992 (Australia)
No.	Title	Length
1.	"Here to Stay" (radio edit)	3:58
2.	"Here to Stay" (original edit)	5:00
3.	"Here to Stay" (Felix da Housecat - Thee Extended Glitz Mix)	8:08
4.	"Here to Stay" (The Scumfrog - Dub Mix)	8:04
5.	"Here to Stay" (extended instrumental) (Remixed by The Chemical Brothers)	5:57
6.	"Player in the League"	5:35

12": NUOX11 (UK & Europe)
No.	Title	Length
1.	"Here to Stay" (full-length vocal)	5:00
2.	"Crystal"	6:49
3.	"Here to Stay" (Felix da Housecat - Thee Extended Glitz Mix)	8:08
4.	"Here to Stay" (The Scumfrog - Dub Mix)	7:47

DVD: NUDVD9 (UK & Europe)
No.	Title	Length
1.	"Here to Stay" (Video)	3:55
2.	"Here to Stay" (radio edit) (Audio)	3:55
3.	"Here to Stay" (Felix da Housecat - Thee Extended Glitz Mix) (Audio)	8:08
4.	"24 Hour Party People" (4 × 30 second clips) (Video)	2:00

== Chart positions ==
Chart (2002)	Peak position
Australia ARIA Singles Chart	64
French SNEP Singles Chart	99
German Media Control Singles Chart	77
Irish Singles Chart	42
UK Singles Chart	15
