= Touched by the Hand of God =

1987 single by New Order

Single by New Order

from the album Salvation!
- Released: 7 December 1987
- Length: 5:02 (Original), 3:47 (7-inch), 7:02 (12-inch)
- Label: Factory
- Songwriters: Gillian Gilbert, Peter Hook, Stephen Morris, Bernard Sumner
- Producer: New Order

New Order singles chronology
"True Faith" (1987)	"Touched by the Hand of God" (1987)	"Blue Monday 1988" (1988)

Music video
- "Touched by the Hand of God" on YouTube

"Touched by the Hand of God" is a song by English band New Order, released as a single on 7 December 1987. The song was originally recorded for the soundtrack to the film Salvation! and the version released as a single was remixed by Arthur Baker. The B-side was a dub remix, titled "Touched by the Hand of Dub", and the release had the catalogue number FAC 193; its production is credited to New Order.

Although not a track taken from a studio album, "Touched by the Hand of God" appears on the 2008 collector's edition of New Order's album Brotherhood in its remix version, on the 1994 compilation The Best of New Order and in remixed form on 1995's The Rest of New Order. In the US, the song was released as the B-side to the group's following single "Blue Monday 1988", though it was billed as a double A-side on the Billboard Hot Dance Club Play and Maxi-Singles charts.

== Background ==
The song's title references the illegal hand of God goal scored by Argentine footballer Diego Maradona against England in the 1986 FIFA World Cup. In promotion, Factory Records produced 30 limited-edition footballs with the song name printed on it.

== Music video ==
The video that accompanied the song was directed by Kathryn Bigelow, and parodied glam metal groups of the same period, with the band miming to the music while wearing long wigs and leather clothing. The video also contains a love scene that is intercut with the performance shots, and stars Femi Gardiner and Bill Paxton. The concept was proposed by manager Rob Gretton, and was inspired by the band having seen the clichés of then-popular videos on MTV while touring America. Bassist Peter Hook said in a 2000 interview that one of the bands that served as inspiration for the spoof video was Mötley Crüe, whose song “Girls, Girls, Girls” played in heavy rotation on MTV at the time.

== Track listings ==
All tracks are written by Gillian Gilbert, Peter Hook, Stephen Morris and Bernard Sumner, except where indicated.

7-inch single: Fac193/7 (UK)
No.	Title	Length
1.	"Touched by the Hand of God"	3:47
2.	"Touched by the Hand of Dub"	4:11

12-inch single: Fac193 (UK)
No.	Title	Length
1.	"Touched by the Hand of God"	7:02
2.	"Touched by the Hand of Dub"	5:30

CD single: Facd193 (UK)
No.	Title	Writer(s)	Length
1.	"Touched by the Hand of God"		7:02
2.	"Confusion Dub 1987"	Arthur Baker, Gilbert, Hook, Morris, Sumner	5:23
3.	"Temptation" (actually the 1987 recording but incorrectly labelled as the original mix)		7:00

7-inch and cassette single: 7-27979, 4-27979 (US)
No.	Title	Length
1.	"Blue Monday 1988" (single mix)	4:10
2.	"Touched by the Hand of God" (single version)	3:41

12-inch single: 0-20869 (US)
No.	Title	Length
1.	"Blue Monday 1988" (12-inch mix)	7:09
2.	"Blue Monday 1988" (dub)	7:16
3.	"Touched by the Hand of God" (remix)	7:02
4.	"Touched by the Hand of God" (dub)	5:30

== Charts ==
=== Weekly charts ===
Weekly chart performance for "Touched by the Hand of God"
Chart (1987–1988)	Peak position
Australia (Australian Music Report)	15
Europe (European Hot 100 Singles)	68
Finland (Suomen virallinen lista)	22
Greece (IFPI)	3
Ireland (IRMA)	10
New Zealand (Recorded Music NZ)	5
Norway (VG-lista)	10
UK Singles (Official Charts)	20
UK Indie (MRIB)	1
US Dance Club Songs (Billboard) with "Blue Monday 1988"	1
US Dance Singles Sales (Billboard) with "Blue Monday 1988"	9
West Germany (GfK)	37

=== Year-end charts ===
Year-end chart performance for "Touched by the Hand of God"
Chart (1988)	Position
US Dance Club Songs (Billboard) with "Blue Monday 1988"	37
