= The Perfect Kiss =

1985 single by New Order

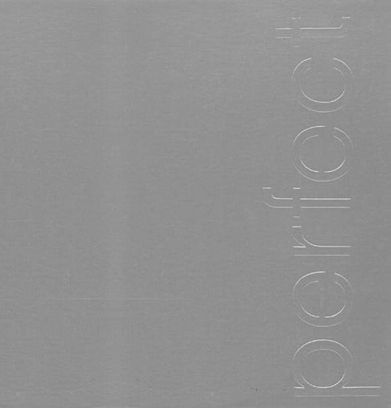

Single by New Order

from the album Low-Life
- B-side: "The Kiss of Death"; "Perfect Pit"
- Released: 13 May 1985
- Recorded: 1984
- Studio: Bernard Sumner's home; Britannia Row, Islington, London
- Genre: Disco; synth-pop; dance-rock
- Length: 4:48 (Album version); 8:46 (Full version)
- Label: Factory - FAC 123
- Songwriters: Gillian Gilbert; Peter Hook; Stephen Morris; Bernard Sumner
- Producer: New Order

New Order singles chronology
"Murder" (1984)	"The Perfect Kiss" (1985)	"Sub-culture" (1985)

"The Perfect Kiss" is the ninth single by the English rock band New Order. It was recorded at Britannia Row Studios in London and released on 13 May 1985 by Factory Records. It is the first New Order song to be released as a single while also included on a studio album (Low-Life). The vinyl version has Factory catalogue number FAC 123 and the video has the opposite number, FAC 321.

== Background ==
The song's themes include love ("We believe in a land of love") and death ("the perfect kiss is the kiss of death"). The overall meaning of the song is unclear to its writer today. In an interview with GQ magazine, New Order's singer and guitarist Bernard Sumner said "I haven't a clue what this is about." He agreed with the interviewer that his best known lyric is in the song: "Pretending not to see his gun / I said, 'Let's go out and have some fun'". The lyrics, he added, came about after the band was visiting a man's house in the United States who showed his guns under his bed before they went out for an enjoyable night. It had been quickly written, recorded and mixed without sleep before the band went on tour in Australia.

The song, while never officially remixed by the band's label, exists in many lengths, all edited from the 8:46 full-length version found on the 12-inch single. These include the 4:48 Low-life album version, the 3:51 UK 7-inch version, the 4:23 US 7-inch version, the 8:02 Substance CD/DAT version, the 4:23 Total version, and a 5:26 Canadian promotional version.

== Critical reception ==
John Leland of Spin wrote: "A dreamy, melancholy melody runs over the electronic and unfortunately guitar-less hooks. But the best part is the end, when they turn all the machines to max and mash the thing up."

=== Retrospective reviews ===
Writing for AllMusic, Mike DeGagne called it one of the band's "most dynamic tracks", praising how the song's "slightly stressed rhythmic undercurrent, crisp movement, and flawless dance club beat accompany Summer's vocals without diminishing them the least bit and New Order had yet another hit, forged in the same style as 1982's [sic] 'Blue Monday.'"

== Video ==
An 11-minute live version of the song, used as its official video, was filmed by Jonathan Demme in 1985, which Billboard in 2017 termed New Order's "most arresting visual ever." There also exists a 5:18 edit of the video found on the limited edition DVD included with some copies of the US release of International, as well as an alternate recording from the same session, the audio of which was released on the limited edition bonus CD included with some copies of the Retro box set.

== Track listing ==
All tracks are written by Gillian Gilbert, Peter Hook, Stephen Morris and Bernard Sumner.

12": FAC 123 (UK) / Qwest 9 20330-0 (US) / FACX 23 (CA)
No.	Title	Length
1.	"The Perfect Kiss"	8:46
2.	"The Kiss of Death"	7:02
3.	"Perfect Pit"	1:24

12" promo: PRO-A-2342 (US)
No.	Title	Length
1.	"The Perfect Kiss (Single Edit)"	4:23
2.	"The Perfect Kiss (Live Version From The Perfect Kiss Video)"	5:18

7": FAC 123 (UK)
No.	Title	Length
1.	"The Perfect Kiss"	3:51
2.	"The Kiss of Death"	3:01

7": 9 28968-7 (US) / FAC 23 (CA)
No.	Title	Length
1.	"The Perfect Kiss"	4:23
2.	"The Perfect Kiss (Instrumental)"	5:09

== Charts ==
=== Weekly charts ===
Weekly chart performance for "The Perfect Kiss"
Chart (1985)	Peak position
Australia (Kent Music Report)	85
Ireland (IRMA)	15
Netherlands (Dutch Top 40 Tipparade) with "The Kiss of Death"	2
New Zealand (Recorded Music NZ)	10
UK Singles (Official Charts)	46
UK Indie (MRIB)	1
US Dance Club Songs (Billboard)	5
US Dance Singles Sales (Billboard)	5

=== Year-end charts ===
Year-end chart performance for "The Perfect Kiss"
Chart (1985)	Position
US Dance Club Songs (Billboard)	47
US Dance Singles Sales (Billboard)	37
