= Krafty =

2005 single by New Order

Single by New Order

from the album Waiting for the Sirens' Call
- Released: 7 March 2005
- Length: 4:33 (album version); 3:47 (single edit)
- Label: London; Warner Bros.
- Songwriters: Bernard Sumner; Stephen Morris; Phil Cunningham; Peter Hook
- Producers: New Order; John Leckie

New Order singles chronology
| "Here to Stay" (2002) | "Krafty" (2005) | "Jetstream" (2005) |

"Krafty" is a song by English music group New Order, released as the first single from their eighth studio album, Waiting for the Sirens' Call (2005). It marked the first new release by New Order for Warner Bros. Records without London Records and was produced by John Leckie. As with most New Order releases, the artwork design is provided by Peter Saville.

== Track listings ==
All tracks are written by New Order.

CD 1: NUOCD13 (UK and Europe)
| No. | Title | Length |
|---|---|---|
| 1. | "Krafty" (single edit) | 3:50 |
| 2. | "Krafty" (album version) | 4:33 |

CD 2: NUCDP13 (UK and Europe)
| No. | Title | Length |
|---|---|---|
| 1. | "Krafty" (The Glimmers 12-inch extended mix) | 6:55 |
| 2. | "Krafty" (Phones Reality remix) (remixed by Paul Epworth) | 7:08 |
| 3. | "Krafty" (Andy Green remix) | 3:25 |
| 4. | "Krafty" (re-edit of album version) (mixed by Rich Costey) | 4:51 |
| 5. | "Krafty" (video) | 3:47 |

HDCD: 42800-2 (US)
| No. | Title | Length |
|---|---|---|
| 1. | "Krafty" (radio edit) | 3:47 |
| 2. | "Krafty" (Morel's Pink Noise vocal) (remixed by Richard Morel) | 7:52 |
| 3. | "Krafty" (DJ Dan vocal) | 8:18 |
| 4. | "Krafty" (Eric Kupper club mix) | 9:11 |
| 5. | "Krafty" (The Glimmers 12-inch extended mix) | 6:52 |
| 6. | "Krafty" (Phones Reality remix) (remixed by Paul Epworth) | 7:06 |
| 7. | "Krafty" (Riton Re-Rub Remix) | 6:54 |

12-inch: NUOX13 (UK and Europe)
| No. | Title | Length |
|---|---|---|
| 1. | "Krafty" (single edit) | 3:47 |
| 2. | "Krafty" (The Glimmers 12-inch extended mix) | 6:52 |
| 3. | "Krafty" (Phones Reality remix) (remixed by Paul Epworth) | 7:05 |
| 4. | "Krafty" (The Glimmers dub version) | 5:53 |

CD: 5046780312 (Australia)
| No. | Title | Length |
|---|---|---|
| 1. | "Krafty" (radio edit) |
| 2. | "Krafty" (The Glimmers 12-inch extended mix) |
| 3. | "Krafty" (Phones Reality remix) |
| 4. | "Krafty" (Andy Green remix) |
| 5. | "Krafty" (album version) |

== Charts ==
=== Weekly charts ===
| Chart (2005) | Peak position |
|---|---|
| Australia (ARIA) | 54 |
| Germany (GfK) | 65 |
| Ireland (IRMA) | 26 |
| Ireland Dance (IRMA) | 2 |
| Scotland Singles (OCC) | 9 |
| Spain (Promusicae) | 4 |
| Sweden (Sverigetopplistan) | 24 |
| UK Singles (OCC) | 8 |
| UK Dance (OCC) | 2 |
| US Dance Club Songs (Billboard) DJ Dan/E. Kupper/Morel mixes | 2 |
| US Dance Singles Sales (Billboard) | 4 |

=== Year-end charts ===
| Chart (2005) | Position |
|---|---|
| US Dance Club Play (Billboard) | 8 |

== Release history ==
| Region | Date | Format(s) | Label(s) | Ref. |
|---|---|---|---|---|
| Australia | 7 March 2005 | CD | London | |
| United Kingdom | 7 March 2005 | 12-inch vinyl; CD | London | |
| United States | 14 March 2005 | Hot adult contemporary; alternative radio | Warner Bros. | |
