= Crystal (New Order song) =

2001 single by New Order

Single by New Order

from the album Get Ready
- B-side: "Behind Closed Doors"
- Released: 11 July 2001
- Genre: Dance-rock; alternative rock; alternative dance
- Length: 6:51 (album version); 4:20 (single version)
- Label: London
- Songwriter: New Order
- Producer: Steve Osborne

New Order singles chronology
"Video 5 8 6" (1997)	"Crystal" (2001)	"60 Miles an Hour" (2001)

"Crystal" is a song by English rock band New Order. The song was released on 11 July 2001 as the first single from their seventh studio album, Get Ready (2001). "Crystal" entered the UK Singles Chart at number eight, attracting considerable attention and critical praise as the band's comeback single, their first original since 1993. The song also found success internationally, peaking at number three in Canada, number seven in Finland, and reaching the top 50 in Germany, Ireland, Italy, and Sweden. "Crystal" appears as the first track on the album in a version different from the single release, with an extended intro and coda.

== Release ==
Singer-guitarist Bernard Sumner originally gave the song to German record label Mastermind for Success, and it was recorded by label artist Corvin Dalek. However, DJ Pete Tong heard the song and declared it to be the best New Order single since "Blue Monday", leading Sumner to reconsider the gift and have New Order record and release it.

A version of the single was also released in Japan to promote the release of the New Order DVD 316, and has a different cover that resembles the 316 cover. B-sides for the single were 4 live audio tracks taken from the DVD. The single was B-sided by a variety of remixes, and an original song titled "Behind Closed Doors", which was produced by Arthur Baker. All versions feature extensive backing vocals from Dawn Zee, mostly wordless. Zee has continued to perform with New Order on all their successive studio albums.

After the song was released, a remix contest was held in which there were thousands of entries around the world.

== Critical reception ==
Joe Tangari of Pitchfork called the song as "possibly one of New Order's best singles". Drowned in Sound rated it a 9/10 and described it as "fantastic" and the "confident, strutting return of a band that knows that the music industry has missed it." Stereogum placed the song at number ten in the list of their top ten best New Order songs.

== Promotion ==
The main music video, set to the album version, was directed by Johan Renck, produced by Nicola Doring through London production company Jane Fuller Associates and cinematographed by Fredrik Callinggård. It does not feature New Order; instead, it depicts a younger band miming to New Order's music and words. At the end, a large number of people come on stage to pull them off-stage.

The DVD single contains an alternate music video, set to the "Special Circumstances Mix (Digweed & Muir Bedrock Radio Edit)" of the song. Directed and produced by Gina Birch and Simon Tyszko, the video depicts a motorcycle ride through city streets at night, viewed through two side-by-side shots filmed with sub miniature video cameras mounted in boots.

The cover art for the CD and DVD shows actress and model Nicolette Krebitz with her trousers below her knees.

== Legacy ==
The fictional band seen in the song's music video is named "The Killers". This would inspire the name of American rock band the Killers, who would also lift a number of elements of the set layout in the "Crystal" video for their own video "Somebody Told Me".

In 2005, at Scotland's T in the Park festival, New Order performed the song with the Killers' frontman, Brandon Flowers, singing the main vocals in a guest performance. In 2013, at a gig in Manchester, Bernard Sumner joined the Killers onstage to perform the song. Also in 2013, Brandon Flowers joined New Order in Bogotá, Colombia, to perform this song. When the Killers were on-stage, Sumner joined them to play "Shadowplay", a Joy Division song covered by the Killers. In March 2016, at The Chelsea at The Cosmopolitan in Las Vegas, New Order performed "Crystal" with Flowers singing the main vocals in a guest performance.

== Track listings ==
All tracks are written by Gillian Gilbert, Peter Hook, Stephen Morris and Bernard Sumner, except where indicated.

CD 1: NUOCD8 (UK & Europe)
No.	Title	Length
1.	"Crystal"	4:19
2.	"Behind Closed Doors"	5:24
3.	"Crystal" (Digweed & Muir 'Bedrock' mix edit) (remixed by John Digweed and Nick Muir)	10:06

CD 2: NUCDP8 (UK & Europe)
No.	Title	Length
1.	"Crystal" (Digweed & Muir 'Bedrock' radio edit) (remixed by John Digweed and Nick Muir)	4:16
2.	"Crystal" (Lee Coombs remix)	8:44
3.	"Crystal" (John Creamer & Stephane K main remix edit)	6:39

CD: WPCR-10985 (Japan)
No.	Title	Writer(s)	Length
1.	"Crystal"
2.	"True Faith" (live from the Reading Festival, 30 August 1998)	Gilbert, Stephen Hague, Hook, Morris, Sumner
3.	"Temptation" (live from the Reading Festival, 30 August 1998)
4.	"Atmosphere" (live from the Reading Festival, 30 August 1998)	Ian Curtis, Hook, Morris, Sumner
5.	"Isolation" (live from the Reading Festival, 30 August 1998)	Curtis, Hook, Morris, Sumner

CD: 9 42397-2 (US)
No.	Title	Length
1.	"Crystal" (radio edit)	4:19
2.	"Crystal" (Digweed & Muir Bedrock radio edit)	4:16
3.	"Crystal" (Digweed & Muir Bedrock mix)	12:52
4.	"Crystal" (Digweed & Muir Bedrock dub)	10:33
5.	"Crystal" (Lee Coombs remix)	8:44
6.	"Crystal" (Lee Coombs dub)	7:04
7.	"Crystal" (John Creamer & Stephane K main remix)	3:22
8.	"Crystal" (Creamer K main mix)	11:25
9.	"Behind Closed Doors"	5:24
Total length:		68:17

DVD: NUDVD8 (UK & Europe)
No.	Title	Writer(s)	Length
1.	"Crystal" (video directed by Johan Renck)
2.	"Behind Closed Doors" (audio)
3.	"Temptation" (video filmed for the 2002 Commonwealth Games – Manchester bid)
4.	"Isolation" (video, live from the Reading Festival, 30 August 1998)	Curtis, Hook, Morris, Sumner
5.	"True Faith" (video, live from the Reading Festival, 30 August 1998)	Gilbert, Hague, Hook, Morris, Sumner

- Numerous "Crystal" 12-inch records were released, with the Bedrock, Lee Coombs and John Creamer & Stephane K remixes each released on individual 12-inch singles.

== Charts ==
=== Weekly charts ===
Weekly chart performance for "Crystal"
Chart (2001)	Peak position
Australia (ARIA)	53
Belgium (Ultratip Bubbling Under Wallonia)	15
Canada (Nielsen SoundScan)	3
Europe (Eurochart Hot 100)	35
Finland (Suomen virallinen lista)	7
Germany (GfK)	39
Ireland (IRMA)	24
Ireland Dance (IRMA)	10
Italy (FIMI)	50
Scotland Singles (OCC)	8
Sweden (Sverigetopplistan)	30
Switzerland (Schweizer Hitparade)	83
UK Singles (OCC)	8
US Dance Club Songs (Billboard)	1
US Dance Singles Sales (Billboard)	3

=== Year-end charts ===
2001 year-end chart performance for "Crystal"
Chart (2001)	Position
Canada (Nielsen SoundScan)	65
US Dance Club Play (Billboard)	10

2002 year-end chart performance for "Crystal"
Chart (2002)	Position
Canada (Nielsen SoundScan)	160

== Release history ==
Release dates and formats for "Crystal"
Region	Date	Format(s)	Label(s)	Ref(s).
Japan	11 July 2001	CD	London	
United Kingdom	13 August 2001	CD; DVD	London	
Australia	20 August 2001	CD	London; Warner Music Australia	
United States	28 August 2001	Active rock; alternative radio	Reprise	
Japan	24 October 2001	DVD	London	
United States	5 November 2001	Hot adult contemporary radio	Reprise	
