= True Faith (song) =

1987 single by New Order

Single by New Order

from the album Substance 1987
- B-side: "1963"
- Released: 20 July 1987
- Genre: Synth-pop; alternative dance
- Length: 4:12 (7-inch and video edit); 5:53 (12-inch)
- Label: Factory
- Songwriters: Gillian Gilbert; Stephen Hague; Peter Hook; Stephen Morris; Bernard Sumner
- Producers: New Order; Stephen Hague

New Order singles chronology
"Bizarre Love Triangle" (1986)	"True Faith" (1987)	"Touched by the Hand of God" (1987)

Music video
- "True Faith" on YouTube

"True Faith-94"

Single by New Order

from the album The Best of New Order
- Released: 31 October 1994
- Recorded: 1987
- Length: 4:30 (US version); 5:35 (general release version)
- Label: London
- Producers: New Order; Stephen Hague

New Order singles chronology
"Spooky" (1993)	"True Faith-94" (1994)	"1963" (1995)

"True Faith" is a song by the English rock band New Order, co-written and co-produced by the band and Stephen Hague. It was the first New Order single since their debut "Ceremony" to be issued in the UK as two separate 12-inch singles. The second 12-inch single features two remixes by Shep Pettibone. The promotional video of the single with a sequence featuring two men slapping each other in turn, received media attention and was on heavy rotation on music TV channels, helping the band to reach a wider audience.

The single peaked at number 4 in the United Kingdom on its original release in 1987. In the United States, "True Faith" became New Order's first single to appear on the Billboard Hot 100, ultimately peaking at number 32. In 1994 a "True Faith" remix was released, and the song charted a second time in the UK at number 9. "True Faith" is one of New Order's most popular songs.

== Original releases ==
New Order wrote and recorded "True Faith" and "1963" during a 10-day studio session with producer Stephen Hague. The two songs were written as new material for New Order's first singles compilation album, Substance 1987. After the two songs were recorded, the band's US management decided that "True Faith" was the stronger track and would be released as the new single, with "1963" as the B-side ("1963" was remixed and issued as a single in its own right in 1995).

"That wasn't really a happy period in New Order's life," recalled Peter Hook. "Let's just say it was a bit of a battle for me to get on there at all, apart from in the sense of helping write the song. Musically, we were moving more towards straight dance and I was keen on keeping the New Order I'd known and loved. I eventually managed to get my bass on the original version. But, of course, the first thing any remixers do is take off my bass and put their own on. I sometimes feel like attaching a note saying, How about keeping the bass?"

While never appearing on an original album, it was included on most of the band's "best of" collections (Substance 1987, The Best of New Order, Retro, International, Singles and Total). The first public performance of the song took place at the 1987 Glastonbury Festival; this version appears on the group's BBC Radio 1 Live in Concert album.

The original 7-inch version of the song did not appear on any album until 2011's Total: From Joy Division to New Order.

== Composition ==
The song is composed in the key of D minor with an outro in G major.

As is the case for many New Order songs of this period, the words in the title do not appear anywhere in the lyrics.

The original lyrics included a verse that read "Now that we've grown up together/They're all taking drugs with me". Hague convinced Bernard Sumner to change the latter line to "They're afraid of what they see" because he was worried that otherwise it would not get played on the radio. When performing the song live, the band have usually used the original line.

During a live performance in 1993 in Reading, Sumner replaced the first lines of the second verse with the lyrics "When I was a very small boy, Michael Jackson played with me. Now that we've grown up together, he's playing with my willy." This was a topical reference to the allegations of sexual abuse against the singer.

== Technical details ==
"True Faith" was recorded at Advision Studio One, with production by New Order and Stephen Hague and was engineered by David Jacob. According to Hague, the studio featured "...a first generation SSL board and big old UREI Time Align monitors. "True Faith" was created using a wide range of electronic musical equipment. According to an interview in Sound on Sound by Richard Buskin, Hague notes that New Order provided a Yamaha QX 1, an Octave Voyetra 8 polyphonic synthesizer, a Yamaha DX 5 and an Akai S900 sampler, while he provided an E-mu Emulator II and an E-mu SP12.

== Critical reception ==
In 2013, Stereogum ranked "True Faith" number four on their list of the 10 greatest New Order songs, writing that "The drums do one thing: stomp. The synth bass rolls right along, locked in the same bouncing-ball pattern forever. There's hardly any flash on display: everything in service to everything else, all bowing to the simplicity of the song itself. Even Peter Hook, who shows up for his usual lead-bass acrobatics, is relatively restrained, in part due to the density of the mix. So it falls to the vocal to keep our attention — what we get is Bernard Sumner singing simply, plainly, effortlessly, somehow delivering some of the strongest lyrics of his career inside one of the band's very best songs".

In 2021, The Guardian ranked the song number one on their list of the 30 greatest New Order songs.

== Music video ==
The release of "True Faith" was accompanied by a surreal music video directed and choreographed by Philippe Decouflé, produced by Michael H. Shamberg. and was edited by Marc Eskenazi.

The opening sequence, showing two men slapping each other, is a reference to Marina Abramović and Ulay's video performance Light/Dark, shot in 1977. Costumed dancers then leap about, fight and slap each other in time to the music, while a person in dark green makeup emerges from an upside-down boxer's speed bag and hand signs the lyrics (in LSF). Other parts of the video were inspired by Bauhaus artist Oskar Schlemmer's Triadisches Ballett.

The video has often been voted amongst the best music videos of its year. Sky Television's channel The Amp, for instance, has it rated as the best video of 1987, Smash Hits magazine's readers rated it as the 3rd best video of 1987 and it won the British Video of the Year in 1988.

The overall tonality, themes and various elements from the video re-occurred in Decouflé's scenography and choreography for the inauguration ceremonies of the 1992 Winter Olympics in Albertville.

The video was slightly modified for the 1994 remix, featuring clips from other New Order videos inserted throughout to promote (the best of) NewOrder compilation. This was also edited by Marc Eskenazi. The clips that appear in the '94 remix video are taken from the music videos for Bizarre Love Triangle, Blue Monday 1988, Run 2, Regret, Fine Time, World In Motion, Touched By The Hand Of God, Round & Round, Spooky, World (Price Of Love) and The Perfect Kiss.

== Personnel ==
Credits sourced from Sound on Sound.

New Order

- Bernard Sumner – lead and backing vocals, Yamaha QX1 sequencer, Yamaha DX5 synthesiser, guitar
- Gillian Gilbert – Octave Voyetra-8 synthesiser
- Stephen Morris – Yamaha QX1 sequencer, Akai S900 sampler, hi-hat, cymbals
- Peter Hook – bass guitar

Additional musicians

- Stephen Hague – E-mu Emulator II, E-mu SP-12 programming

== Track listing ==
=== 1987 release ===
All tracks are written by Gillian Gilbert, Stephen Hague, Peter Hook, Stephen Morris and Bernard Sumner.

7-inch single: Factory FAC 183
No.	Title	Length
1.	"True Faith" (edit)	4:10
2.	"1963"	5:35

7-inch single: Qwest 7-28271 (US)
No.	Title	Length
1.	"True Faith" (The Morning Sun)	4:02
2.	"1963"	5:35

12-inch maxi: Factory Fac 183
No.	Title	Length
1.	"True Faith"	5:53
2.	"1963"	5:55

12-inch maxi: Factory Fac 183R
No.	Title	Length
1.	"True Faith" (remix)	8:59
2.	"1963"	5:32
3.	"True Faith" (True Dub)	10:41

12-inch maxi: Factory Fac 183R (Warner) (Australia)
No.	Title	Length
1.	"True Faith" (remix)	8:59
2.	"Paradise" (remix)	6:40
3.	"True Faith" (True Dub)	10:41

=== True Faith-94 release ===
All tracks are written by Gillian Gilbert, Stephen Hague, Peter Hook, Stephen Morris and Bernard Sumner.

7-inch: NUO5 / Cassette: NUOMC 5 (UK and Europe)
No.	Title	Length
1.	"True Faith-94" (radio edit)	4:28
2.	"True Faith-94" (Perfecto radio edit) (remixed by Paul Oakenfold and Steve Osborne)	4:05

12-inch: NUOX 5 (UK and Europe)
No.	Title	Length
1.	"True Faith-94" (Perfecto mix) (remixed by Paul Oakenfold and Steve Osborne)	6:23
2.	"True Faith-94" (Sexy disco dub) (remixed by Paul Oakenfold and Steve Osborne)	5:49
3.	"True Faith-94" (TWA Grim Up North mix) (remixed by TWA – P. Fryer, P. Dillon and N. Raphael)	6:11
4.	"True Faith-94" (The 94 remix)	5:34

CD: NUOCD 5 (UK and Europe)
No.	Title	Length
1.	"True Faith-94" (radio edit)	4:28
2.	"True Faith-94" (Perfecto radio edit) (remixed by Paul Oakenfold and Steve Osborne)	4:05
3.	"True Faith-94" (Perfecto mix) (remixed by Paul Oakenfold and Steve Osborne)	6:23
4.	"True Faith-94" (12-inch version)	5:34
5.	"True Faith-94" (TWA Grim Up North mix) (remixed by TWA – P. Fryer, P. Dillon and N. Raphael)	6:11

== Charts ==
=== Original version ===
==== Weekly charts ====
Chart (1987)	Peak position
Australia (Kent Music Report)	8
Belgium (Ultratop 50 Flanders)	33
Canada Top Singles (RPM)	53
Europe (European Hot 100 Singles)	17
Ireland (IRMA)	5
Italy Airplay (Music & Media)	2
Netherlands (Single Top 100)	59
New Zealand (Recorded Music NZ)	4
Switzerland (Schweizer Hitparade)	13
UK Singles (Official Charts)	4
UK Indie (OCC)	1
US Billboard Hot 100	32
US 12-inch Singles Sales (Billboard) Remix	10
US Dance Club Play (Billboard) Remix	3
US Cash Box Top 100	30
West Germany (GfK)	8

==== Year-end charts ====
Chart (1987)	Position
Australia (Australian Music Report)	51
New Zealand (RIANZ)	42
UK Singles (OCC)	60
West Germany (Media Control)	68

=== "True Faith-94" ===
==== Weekly charts ====
Chart (1994–1995)	Peak position
Australia (ARIA)	69
Europe (Eurochart Hot 100)	32
Europe (European Hit Radio)	38
Ireland (IRMA)	11
Scottish Singles Sales (Official Charts)	6
UK Singles (Official Charts)	9
UK Dance (Official Charts)	3
UK Airplay (Music Week)	6
UK Club Chart (Music Week)	19

==== Year-end charts ====
Chart (1994)	Position
UK Singles (OCC)	130

== Certifications ==
Region	Certification	Certified units/sales
United Kingdom (BPI)	Gold	400,000^{‡}
^{‡} Sales+streaming figures based on certification alone.

== Cover versions ==
=== George Michael version ===
"True Faith"

Single by George Michael
- B-side: "True Faith" (instrumental)
- Released: 13 March 2011
- Length: 4:18
- Label: Aegean; BBC
- Songwriters: Gillian Gilbert; Stephen Hague; Peter Hook; Stephen Morris; Bernard Sumner
- Producer: George Michael

George Michael singles chronology
"December Song (I Dreamed of Christmas)" (2008)	"True Faith" (2011)	"White Light" (2012)

Music video
- "True Faith" on YouTube

English singer-songwriter George Michael covered "True Faith" in 2011 in support of the charity fund Comic Relief. Throughout the song, Michael's vocals are electronically masked using a vocoder, which garnered mixed reactions. In response, he joked: "People like to make exceptions for me." Peaking at number 27 on the UK Singles Chart, the song made its television debut on BBC, as one of five music videos recorded for Red Nose Day 2011.

Chart (2011)	Peak position
Denmark (Tracklisten)	38
Netherlands (Single Top 100)	38
UK Singles (Official Charts)	27

=== Lotte Kestner / The Last of Us Part II version ===
The trailer for the 2020 action-adventure video game The Last of Us Part II featured the character Ellie performing an acoustic rendition of the song, which bore a striking resemblance to a 2011 cover by Lotte Kestner. When Kestner revealed that she had not been credited for her cover of the song being featured, the game's director Neil Druckmann apologized and blamed it on an oversight. The game's publisher Sony Interactive Entertainment looked into the matter, and Kestner was subsequently credited on promotional materials. The television adaptation of The Last of Us would eventually feature Kestner's version in the end credits to the episode "Please Hold to My Hand".

=== The Flux (Noah Sebastian) / Paradise City version ===
The song was performed by Noah Sebastian of Bad Omens under the fictional band the Flux. This version was recorded for both the TV series Paradise City and the soundtrack album of the same name released by Sumerian Records.

=== Anberlin version ===
American rock band Anberlin included a cover version of the song on the Deluxe edition of their 2008 album New Surrender.
