= Regret (New Order song) =

1993 single by New Order

Single by New Order

from the album Republic
- Released: 5 April 1993
- Genre: Alternative rock
- Length: 4:07
- Label: London
- Songwriters: Bernard Sumner; Peter Hook; Stephen Morris; Gillian Gilbert; Stephen Hague
- Producers: New Order; Stephen Hague

New Order singles chronology
"World in Motion" (1990)	"Regret" (1993)	"Ruined in a Day" (1993)

Official Video
- "Regret" on YouTube

"Regret" is a song by the British alternative rock band New Order. It was released on 5 April 1993 by London Records as the lead single from their sixth studio album, Republic (1993). Stephen Hague is credited as both the producer and as a co-writer. It was the band's first single released on CentreDate Co Ltd (through London Records) following the collapse of Factory Records.

The song was a critical and commercial success, reaching the top 10 in Canada, Ireland, Portugal and the United Kingdom. It peaked at number 28 on the US Billboard Hot 100, the group's highest placement on that chart, and reached number one on two other Billboard charts. Peter Care directed a music video for the song in Rome, Italy; the cost of the video shoot went over £200,000.

== Release ==
The single was released worldwide in a variety of formats. The B-side of the single differed in the various releases, but all were remixes of the A-side, including the "Fire Island Mix", and "Junior Dub" by Pete Heller and Terry Farley, and two mixes by The Sabres of Paradise.

== Critical reception ==
In 2010, Pitchfork included the song at number 34 on their "Top 200 Tracks of the 90s" list; staff writer Tom Ewing called it the band's "last truly great single". Ewing on his own Freaky Trigger site named it his 37th-favourite single of the 1990s. John Bush of AllMusic described it "as sublime a balance of obtuse lyrics, just barely emoted vocals, vague club leanings, and grooving synth melodics as their classic material." Bassist Peter Hook called it the "last good New Order song" in a 2013 interview.

== Chart performance ==
The song reached number four on the UK Singles Chart, the last time the band had a top five hit. "Regret" also peaked at number 28 on the US Billboard Hot 100, thus becoming the band's highest-charting single in the United States. The song also appeared on several other charts in the US, including two terms at number one on the Modern Rock Tracks chart (now the Alternative Songs chart). During its second term at number one on the Modern Rock Tracks chart, "Regret" also topped the Hot Dance Music/Club Play chart on the strength of its remixes. At the end of 1993, the song came in at number one on the Modern Rock Tracks' year-end chart. On Canada's RPM 100 Hit Tracks chart, the song debuted at number 80 on 15 May 1993 and climbed to its peak of number six on 3 July, staying there for two weeks and spending six weeks in the top 10. It also reached number five on the RPM Dance chart on 17 July.

== Live performances ==
In 1993 New Order filmed a live performance of the song for Top of the Pops in Venice Beach, California as part of an episode of the hit TV series Baywatch, featuring David Hasselhoff and various background actors and bikini-clad actresses dancing and playing on the beach. The band's performance was directed by music video and feature film director Thomas Mignone and was broadcast via satellite to the United Kingdom.

== Track listings ==
All tracks are written by Gillian Gilbert, Stephen Hague, Peter Hook, Stephen Morris and Bernard Sumner.

7-inch: NUO 1, cassette: NUOMC1 (UK and Europe)
No.	Title	Length
1.	"Regret" (7-inch version)	4:07
2.	"Regret" (The NewOrder mix)	5:10

12-inch: NUOX1 (UK and Europe)
No.	Title	Length
1.	"Regret" (Fire Island mix)	7:15
2.	"Regret" (Junior Dub mix)	7:44
3.	"Regret" (Sabres Slow 'n' Lo)	12:49
4.	"Regret" (Sabres Fast 'n' Throb)	12:11

Maxi-CD: NUOCD1 (Germany)
No.	Title	Length
1.	"Regret" (7-inch version)	4:07
2.	"Regret" (The NewOrder mix)	5:10
3.	"Regret" (The Fire Island mix)	7:15
4.	"Regret" (Junior Dub mix)	7:44

CD: 9 18586-2 (US)
No.	Title	Length
1.	"Regret" (album version)
2.	"Regret" (The NewOrder mix)

== Charts ==
=== Weekly charts ===
Chart (1993)	Peak position
Australia (ARIA)	26
Canada Retail Singles (The Record)	6
Canada Top Singles (RPM)	6
Canada Dance/Urban (RPM)	5
Europe (Eurochart Hot 100)	14
Europe (European Hit Radio)	2
Finland (Suomen virallinen lista)	11
Germany (GfK)	39
Ireland (IRMA)	5
Netherlands (Dutch Top 40 Tipparade)	8
New Zealand (Recorded Music NZ)	30
Portugal (AFP)	3
Sweden (Sverigetopplistan)	19
UK Singles (Official Charts)	4
UK Airplay (Music Week)	1
US Billboard Hot 100	28
US Alternative Airplay (Billboard)	1
US Dance Club Songs (Billboard)	1
US Dance Singles Sales (Billboard)	3
US Pop Airplay (Billboard)	7
US Cash Box Top 100	19

=== Year-end charts ===
Chart (1993)	Position
Canada Top Singles (RPM)	51
Canada Dance/Urban (RPM)	44
UK Singles (OCC)	88
UK Airplay (Music Week)	21
US Maxi-Singles Sales (Billboard)	30
US Modern Rock Tracks (Billboard)	1

== Release history ==
Region	Date	Format(s)	Label(s)	Ref.
United Kingdom	5 April 1993	7-inch vinyl; 12-inch vinyl; CD; cassette	London	
Australia	10 May 1993	CD; cassette	London; Polydor	
Japan	16 May 1993	CD	London	

== See also ==
- List of number-one dance singles of 1993 (U.S.)
- Number one modern rock hits of 1993
