= Stephen Morris (drummer) =

English musician (born 1957)

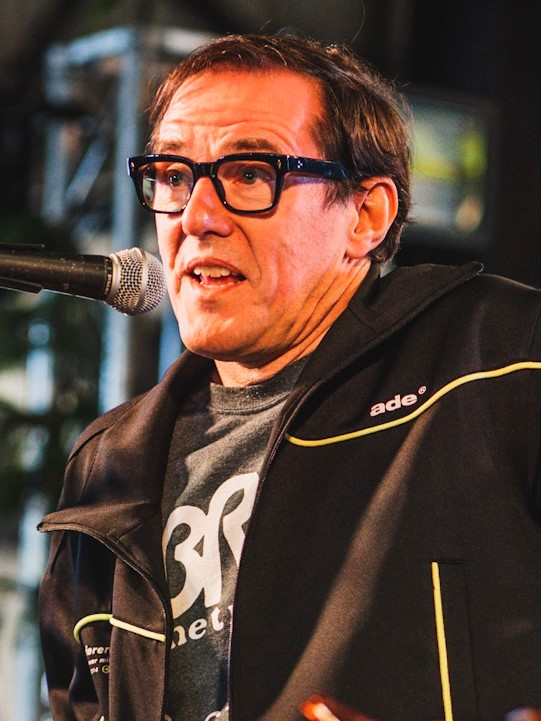
- Morris in 2019

Background information
- Born: Stephen Paul David Morris; 28 October 1957 (age 68); Macclesfield, Cheshire, England
- Genres: Post-punk; alternative rock; alternative dance; synth-pop; electronic; new wave
- Occupation: Musician
- Instruments: Drums; percussion; keyboards
- Years active: 1977–present
- Member of: New Order; The Other Two
- Formerly of: Joy Division
- Spouse: Gillian Gilbert (m. 1994)

Stephen Paul David Morris (born 28 October 1957) is an English musician who is the drummer and percussionist of the rock band New Order and, previously, Joy Division. He also wrote and performed in The Other Two, a band consisting of Morris and his girlfriend and later wife, Gillian Gilbert. Morris also participated in the New Order spin-off band Bad Lieutenant. He and frontman Bernard Sumner are the only two continuous members of New Order, and appeared on every one of the band’s albums. In 2026, Morris was inducted into the Rock and Roll Hall of Fame as a member of Joy Division/New Order after two previous nominations.

== Career ==
Stephen Paul David Morris was born on 28 October 1957, in Macclesfield, Cheshire. His father was a travelling salesman who also put on dances. His uncle was a musician. When Morris told his father he wanted to be a drummer, he replied: "Drummers, Stephen. I’ve never met a sane one yet... They all end up taking morphine and drinking absinthe, rotting their brains. You don’t want to end up like that, do you?" He attended the King's School, Macclesfield, as did Joy Division singer Ian Curtis. After Joy Division (then called Warsaw) tried three other drummers, they eventually recruited Morris, who responded to a wanted ad posted in a local music shop.

Morris is noted for his "machine-like" skills as a drummer, which he credits to krautrock influences, naming Klaus Dinger of Neu! as an important influence.

Drummers he also named as musical inspiration were Jaki Liebezeit of Can and Moe Tucker of the Velvet Underground because they "were the ones who kept it simple". He also cited John French as an influence. From 1977, he was influenced by the music of Siouxsie and the Banshees because their "drummer Kenny Morris played mostly toms"; "hearing the sessions they'd done on John Peel's show and reading gig write-ups", [...] inspired him.

During Joy Division recording sessions with Martin Hannett, Morris was asked to record his parts one drum at a time so that Hannett could have complete control over the production. He also took an early interest in drum machines, combining them with traditional drumming on many Joy Division and New Order releases. Although he is primarily a percussionist, Morris also plays keyboards and synthesizer.

Early on, Morris was a contender to become New Order's lead vocalist, and his vocals can be heard on some early live tracks. He also contributed musically to as-yet-unreleased demos by Quando Quango and produced a number of acts with Gilbert for Factory, such as the duo Red Turns To...., under New Order's Be Music production tag. He played drums for Echo & the Bunnymen on their rendition of the Doors' "Soul Kitchen", which they recorded at Amazon Studios in Liverpool in 1986.

During a break from New Order, Morris and Gilbert formed the side project The Other Two; together they have released two albums as well as various remixes and soundtrack work.

In 2007, Morris and Gilbert remixed two tracks for the Nine Inch Nails remix album Year Zero Remixed. In June 2009, during New Order's second break-up, band members Bernard Sumner and Phil Cunningham, along with Jake Evans, formed a new band called Bad Lieutenant. Morris recorded drums on several songs with the band, and joined their line-up for live gigs. Bad Lieutenant released their debut album Never Cry Another Tear in 2009 and toured from October 2009 to April 2010. They began work on a second album, but are presently on hiatus.

New Order reformed with a new line-up in September 2011, with Morris returning to playing with the band.

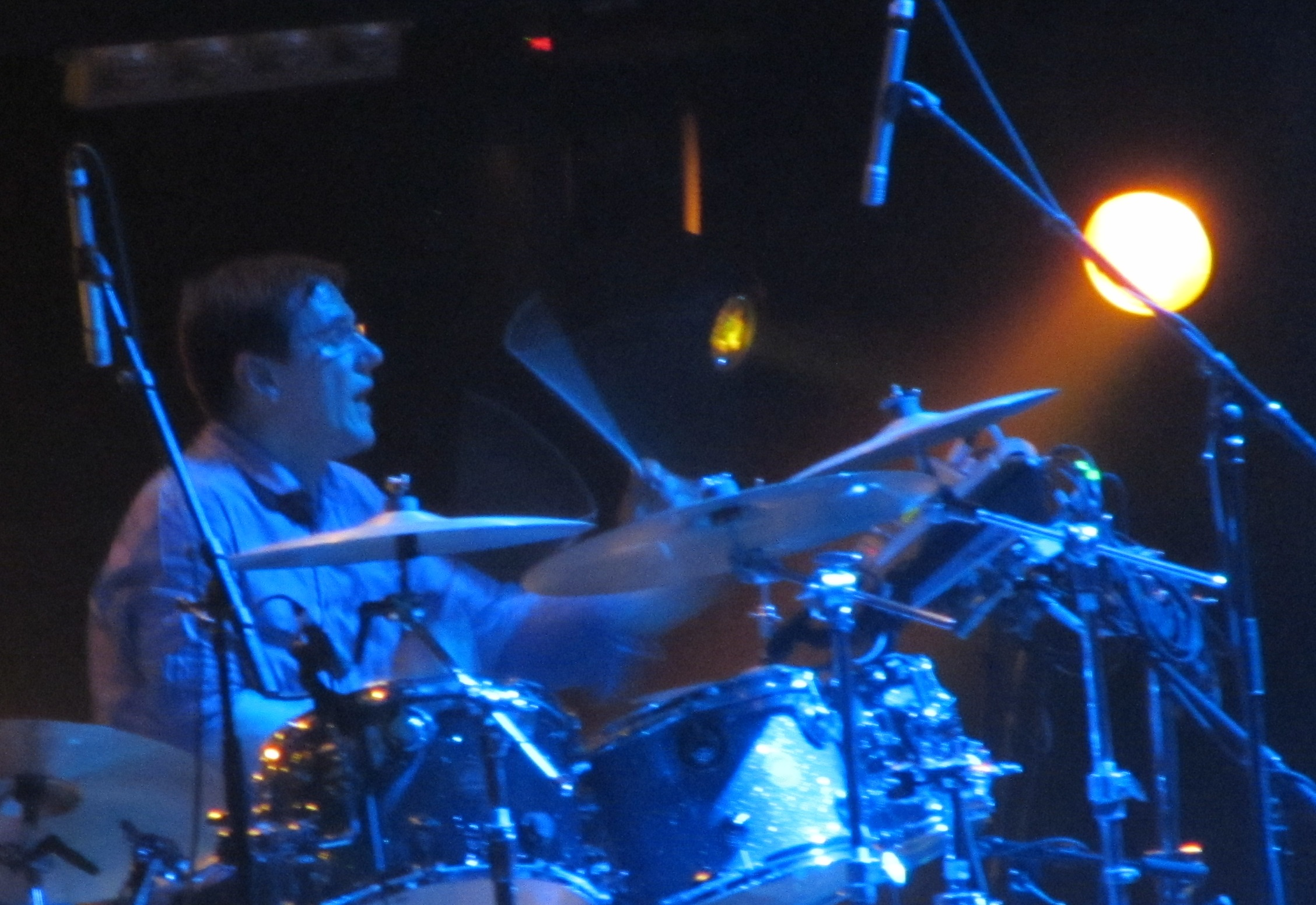
Morris performing with New Order at Mechanics Bay, Auckland, New Zealand, in 2012

In 2019, the book Record Play Pause, the first volume of his Confessions of a Post-Punk Percussionist, was published by Constable and later by Little, Brown and Company.

On 2020 the second volume, Fast Forward, was published by Little, Brown and Company. In 2021 Morris contributed to an interview reflecting on the previous 10 years of New Order

== Personal life ==
In 1979, Morris was questioned about the Yorkshire Ripper case. Joy Division's touring schedule happened to be similar to Peter Sutcliffe's movements which led to the police's suspicion. Following gigs in Halifax, Huddersfield, Leeds and Manchester, both Morris and bass player Peter Hook were questioned.

Morris married fellow New Order member Gillian Gilbert in 1994. The couple live in Rainow, Cheshire, and have two daughters.

He is a science fiction fan, particularly of the TV series Doctor Who. He has a full-sized Dalek replica in his rehearsal room, which Sumner has called "the sixth member" of New Order. He also owns several military vehicles including a Mark IV Ferret armoured reconnaissance vehicle and several tanks.

== Discography ==
=== With The Other Two ===
- The Other Two & You (1993)
- Super Highways (1999)
