= List of songs recorded by New Order =

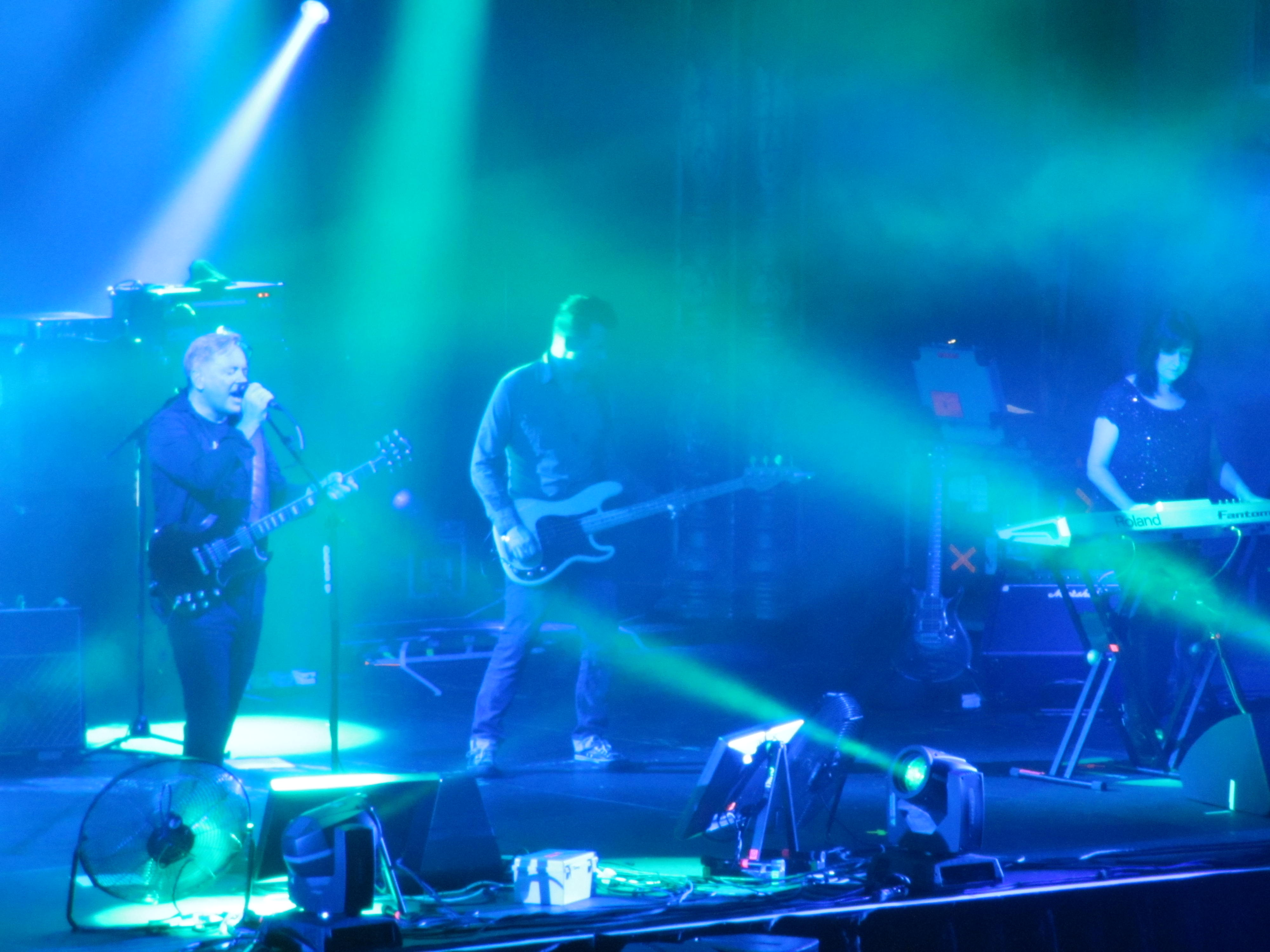
New Order performing in 2012

A list of songs recorded by English band New Order.

== List ==
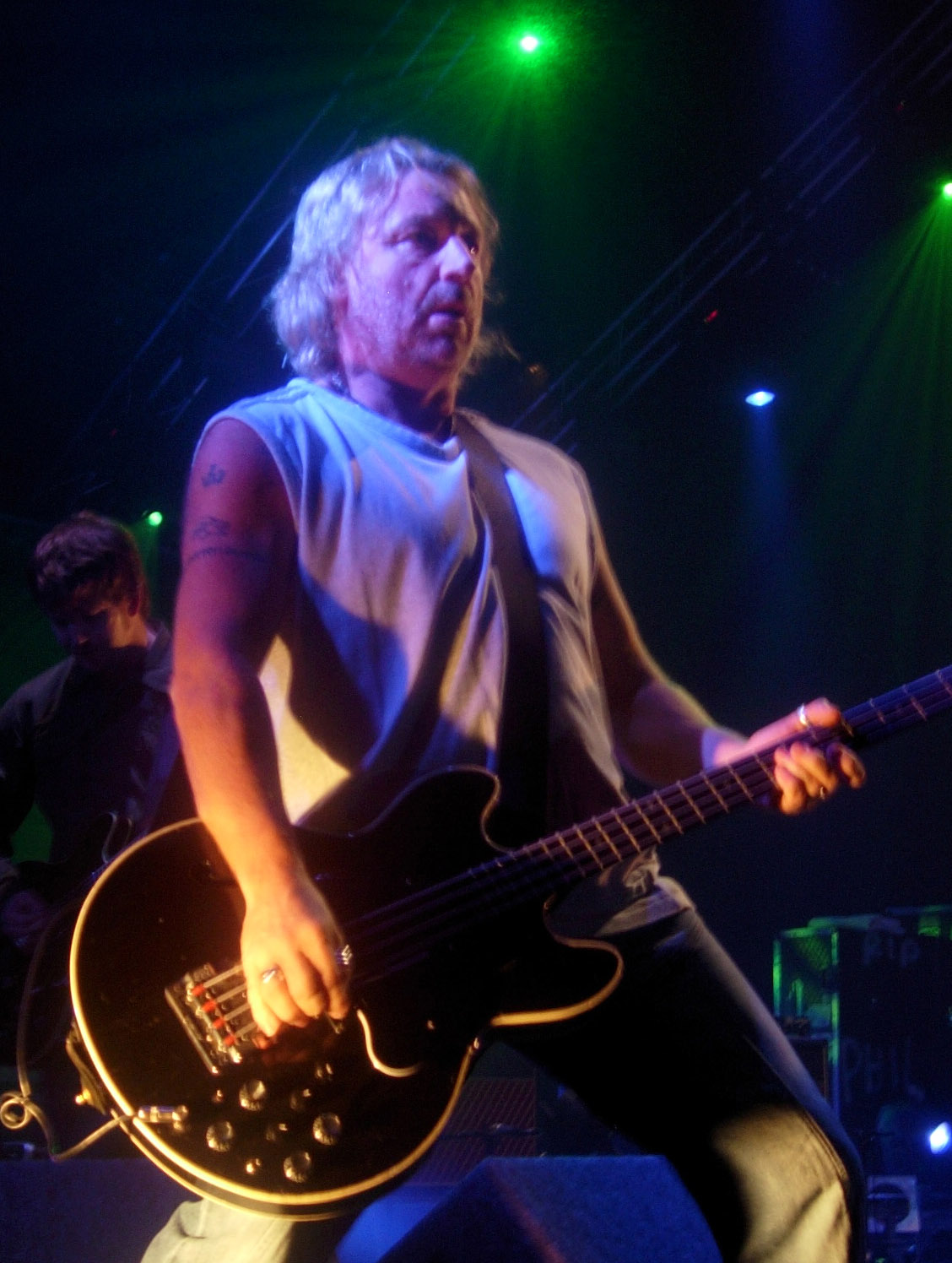
Co-founder Peter Hook was a member until his departure in 2007.

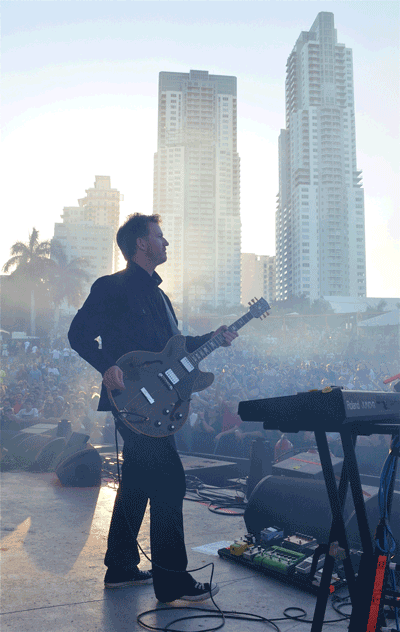
Phil Cunningham has been a member since late 2001.

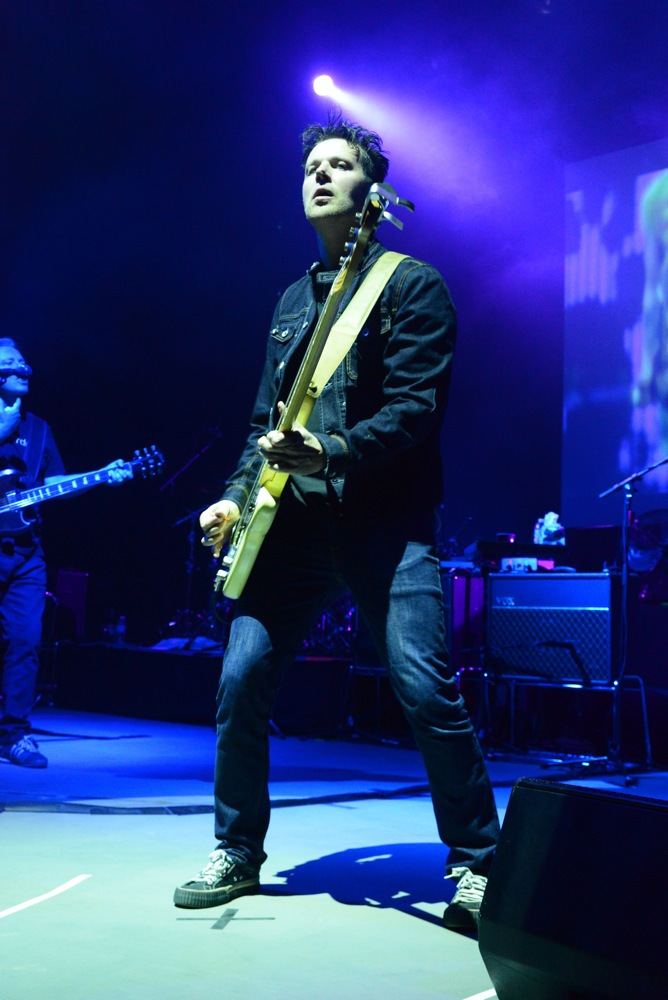
Tom Chapman joined New Order in 2011 as former member Peter Hook's replacement.

All members of New Order are Bernard Sumner, Peter Hook, Gillian Gilbert and Stephen Morris, except where noted.

Key
| ‡ | Indicates songs not solely written by New Order |

Name of song, writers, original release, and year of release.
| Song | Writers | Original release | Year | Ref(s) |
|---|---|---|---|---|
| "1963" | New Order; Stephen Hague ‡ | Non-album single B-side to "True Faith" | 1987 | |
| "5 8 6" | New Order | Power, Corruption & Lies | 1983 | |
| "60 Miles an Hour" | New Order | Get Ready | 2001 | |
| "Academic" | New Order (Note: Bernard Sumner, Stephen Morris, Gillian Gilbert, Phil Cunningham, and Tom Chapman.) | Music Complete | 2015 | |
| "Age of Consent" | New Order | Power, Corruption & Lies | 1983 | |
| "All Day Long" | New Order | Brotherhood | 1986 | |
| "All the Way" | New Order | Technique | 1989 | |
| "Angel Dust" | New Order | Brotherhood | 1986 | |
| "Are You Ready For This?" | New Order (Note: Bernard Sumner, Peter Hook, and Stephen Morris.) | Movement (Definitive Edition) | 2019 | |
| "As It Is When It Was" | New Order | Brotherhood | 1986 | |
| "Avalanche" | New Order; Stephen Hague ‡ | Republic | 1993 | |
| "The B-Side" | New Order; Keith Allen ‡ | Non-album single B-side to "World in Motion" (1990) | 1990 | |
| "The Beach" | New Order | Non-album single B-side to "Blue Monday" | 1983 | |
| "Be a Rebel" | New Order | Non-album single | 2020 | |
| "Behind Closed Doors" | New Order | Non-album single B-side to "Crystal" | 2001 | |
| "Best & Marsh" | New Order | Non-album single B-side to "Round & Round" | 1989 | |
| "Bizarre Love Triangle" | New Order | Brotherhood | 1986 | |
| "Blue Monday" (Note: "Blue Monday" was remixed and re-released by the band twice, once in 1988 as "Blue Monday 1988", and again in 1995 as "Blue Monday-95".) | New Order | Non-album single | 1983 | |
| "Broken Promise" | New Order | Brotherhood | 1986 | |
| "Brutal" | New Order | The Beach (soundtrack) | 2000 | |
| "Californian Grass" | New Order (Note: Bernard Sumner, Peter Hook, Stephen Morris, and Phil Cunningham.) | Lost Sirens | 2013 | |
| "Ceremony" | Joy Division (Note: Ian Curtis, Bernard Sumner, Peter Hook, and Stephen Morris.) ‡ | Non-album single | 1981 | |
| "Chemical" | New Order; Stephen Hague ‡ | Republic | 1993 | |
| "Chosen Time" | New Order | Movement | 1981 | |
| "Close Range" | New Order | Get Ready | 2001 | |
| "Confusion" | New Order; Arthur Baker ‡ | Non-album single | 1983 | |
| "Cries and Whispers" | New Order | Non-album single B-side to "Everything's Gone Green" | 1981 | |
| "Crystal" | New Order | Get Ready | 2001 | |
| "Denial" | New Order | Movement | 1981 | |
| "Don't Do It" | New Order | Non-album single B-side to "Fine Time" | 1988 | |
| "Doubts Even Here" | New Order | Movement | 1981 | |
| "Dracula's Castle" | New Order | Waiting for the Sirens' Call | 2005 | |
| "Dream Attack" | New Order | Technique | 1989 | |
| "Dreams Never End" | New Order | Movement | 1981 | |
| "Dub-vulture" | New Order | Non-album single B-side to "Sub-culture" | 1985 | |
| "Ecstasy" | New Order | Power, Corruption & Lies | 1983 | |
| "Elegia" | New Order | Low-Life | 1985 | |
| "Every Little Counts" | New Order | Brotherhood | 1986 | |
| "Everyone Everywhere" | New Order; Stephen Hague ‡ | Republic | 1993 | |
| "Everything's Gone Green" | New Order | Non-album single B-side to "Procession" (September 1981); A-side (December 1981) | 1981 | |
| "Evil Dust" | New Order | Brotherhood (2008 Collector's Edition bonus disc) | 2008 | |
| "Exit" | New Order | Control (soundtrack) | 2007 | |
| "Face Up" | New Order | Low-Life | 1985 | |
| "Fine Line" | New Order | Non-album single B-side to "Fine Time" | 1988 | |
| "Fine Time" | New Order | Technique | 1988 | |
| "The Game" | New Order | Music Complete | 2015 | |
| "Get Out" | New Order | Control (soundtrack) | 2007 | |
| "Guilt Is a Useless Emotion" | New Order | Waiting for the Sirens' Call | 2005 | |
| "Guilty Partner" | New Order | Technique | 1989 | |
| "Hellbent" | New Order | Lost Sirens | 2013 | |
| "Here to Stay" | New Order | 24 Hour Party People | 2002 | |
| "Hey Now What You Doing" | New Order | Waiting for the Sirens' Call | 2005 | |
| "The Him" | New Order | Movement | 1981 | |
| "Homage" | New Order | Movement (Definitive Edition) | 2019 | |
| "Hurt" | New Order | Non-album single B-side to "Temptation" | 1982 | |
| "Hypnosis" | New Order | Control (soundtrack) | 2007 | |
| "I Told You So" (Note: A version titled "Crazy World Mix" appeared on Lost Sirens.) | New Order | Waiting for the Sirens' Call | 2005 | |
| "I'll Stay with You" | New Order | Lost Sirens | 2013 | |
| "I've Got a Feeling" | New Order | Lost Sirens | 2013 | |
| "ICB" | New Order | Movement | 1981 | |
| "In a Lonely Place" | Joy Division ‡ | Non-album single B-side to "Ceremony" | 1981 | |
| "Jetstream" | New Order; Stuart Price; Ana Lynch ‡ | Waiting for the Sirens' Call | 2005 | |
| "Kiss of Death" | New Order | Non-album single B-side to "The Perfect Kiss" | 1985 | |
| "Krafty" | New Order | Waiting for the Sirens' Call | 2005 | |
| "Leave Me Alone" | New Order | Power, Corruption & Lies | 1983 | |
| "Let's Go" | New Order | Salvation!: Original Motion Picture Soundtrack | 1988 | |
| "Liar" | New Order; Stephen Hague ‡ | Republic | 1993 | |
| "Lonesome Tonight" | New Order; Arthur Baker ‡ | Non-album single B-side to "Thieves Like Us" | 1984 | |
| "Love Less" | New Order | Technique | 1989 | |
| "Love Vigilantes" | New Order | Low-Life | 1985 | |
| "Mesh" | New Order | Non-album single B-side to "Everything's Gone Green" | 1981 | |
| "Morning Night and Day" | New Order | Waiting for the Sirens' Call | 2005 | |
| "Mr. Disco" | New Order | Technique | 1989 | |
| "MTO" | New Order | Non-album single B-side to "Run 2" | 1989 | |
| "Murder" | New Order | Non-album single | 1984 | |
| "Nothing but a Fool" | New Order | Music Complete | 2015 | |
| "Ode to Joy" | New Order | Merry Xmas from the Haçienda and Factory Records | 1982 | |
| "Paradise" | New Order | Brotherhood | 1986 | |
| "People on the High Line" (featuring Elly Jackson) | New Order | Music Complete | 2015 | |
| "The Perfect Kiss" | New Order | Low-Life | 1985 | |
| "Perfect Pit" | New Order | Non-album single B-side to "The Perfect Kiss" | 1985 | |
| "The Peter Saville Show Soundtrack" | New Order | The Peter Saville Show Soundtrack | 2003 | |
| "Plastic" | New Order | Music Complete | 2015 | |
| "Player in the League" | New Order | Non-album single B-side to "Here to Stay" | 2002 | |
| "Primitive Notion" | New Order | Get Ready | 2001 | |
| "Procession" | New Order | Non-album single | 1981 | |
| "Recoil" | New Order | Lost Sirens | 2013 | |
| "Regret" | New Order; Stephen Hague ‡ | Republic | 1993 | |
| "Restless" | New Order | Music Complete | 2015 | |
| "Rocking Carol" | New Order | Merry Xmas from the Haçienda and Factory Records | 1982 | |
| "Rock the Shack" (featuring Bobby Gillespie) | New Order | Get Ready | 2001 | |
| "Round & Round" | New Order | Technique | 1989 | |
| "Ruined in a Day" | New Order; Stephen Hague ‡ | Republic | 1993 | |
| "Run" (Note: The single version of the song is titled "Run 2".) | New Order; John Denver ‡ | Technique | 1989 | |
| "Run Wild" | New Order | Get Ready | 2001 | |
| "Sabotage" | New Order | Non-album single B-side to "60 Miles an Hour" | 2001 | |
| "Salvation Theme" | New Order | Salvation!: Original Motion Picture Soundtrack | 1988 | |
| "Senses" | New Order | Movement | 1981 | |
| "Shake It Up" | New Order | Lost Sirens | 2013 | |
| "Shame of the Nation" | New Order | Non-album single B-side to "State of the Nation" | 1986 | |
| "Shellshock" | New Order; John Robie ‡ | Pretty in Pink (soundtrack) | 1986 | |
| "Singularity" | New Order; Tom Rowlands | Music Complete | 2015 | |
| "Skullcrusher" | New Order | Salvation!: Original Motion Picture Soundtrack | 1988 | |
| "Slow Jam" | New Order | Get Ready | 2001 | |
| "Someone Like You" | New Order | Get Ready | 2001 | |
| "Sooner Than You Think" | New Order | Low-Life | 1985 | |
| "Special" | New Order; Stephen Hague ‡ | Republic | 1993 | |
| "Spooky" | New Order; Stephen Hague ‡ | Republic | 1993 | |
| "Sputnik" | New Order | Salvation!: Original Motion Picture Soundtrack | 1988 | |
| "State of the Nation" | New Order | Non-album single | 1986 | |
| "Stray Dog" (featuring Iggy Pop) | New Order | Music Complete | 2015 | |
| "Sub-culture" | New Order | Low-Life | 1985 | |
| "Such a Good Thing" | New Order; Keith Allen ‡ | Non-album single B-side to "World in Motion..." (2002) | 2002 | |
| "Sugarcane" | New Order | Lost Sirens | 2013 | |
| "Sunrise" | New Order | Low-Life | 1985 | |
| "Superheated" (featuring Brandon Flowers) | New Order; Brandon Flowers ‡ | Music Complete | 2015 | |
| "Temptation" | New Order | Non-album single | 1982 | |
| "Thieves Like Us" | New Order; Arthur Baker ‡ | Non-album single | 1984 | |
| "This Time of Night" | New Order | Low-Life | 1985 | |
| "Times Change" | New Order; Stephen Hague ‡ | Republic | 1993 | |
| "Too Late" | New Order | The Peel Sessions | 1986 | |
| "Touched by the Hand of God" | New Order | Salvation!: Original Motion Picture Soundtrack | 1987 | |
| "True Faith" (Note: "True Faith" was remixed and re-released in 1994 as "True Faith-94".) | New Order; Stephen Hague ‡ | Non-album single | 1987 | |
| "Truth" | New Order | Movement | 1981 | |
| "Turn" | New Order | Waiting for the Sirens' Call | 2005 | |
| "Turn My Way" (featuring Billy Corgan) | New Order | Get Ready | 2001 | |
| "Turn the Heater On" | Keith Hudson ‡ | The Peel Sessions | 1986 | |
| "Tutti Frutti" (featuring Elly Jackson) | New Order | Music Complete | 2015 | |
| "Ultraviolence" | New Order | Power, Corruption & Lies | 1983 | |
| "Unlearn This Hatred" | New Order; Tom Rowlands ‡ | Music Complete | 2015 | |
| "Vanishing Point" | New Order | Technique | 1989 | |
| "Vicious Circle" | New Order | Non-album single B-side to "Ruined in a Day" (1993) | 1993 | |
| "Vicious Streak" | New Order | Get Ready | 2001 | |
| "Video 5 8 6" | New Order | Non-album single | 1997 | |
| "Vietnam" | Jimmy Cliff ‡ | Hope | 2003 | |
| "The Village" | New Order | Power, Corruption & Lies | 1983 | |
| "Waiting for the Sirens' Call" | New Order | Waiting for the Sirens' Call | 2005 | |
| "Way of Life" | New Order | Brotherhood | 1986 | |
| "We All Stand" | New Order | Power, Corruption & Lies | 1983 | |
| "Weirdo" | New Order | Brotherhood | 1986 | |
| "Who's Joe?" | New Order | Waiting for the Sirens' Call | 2005 | |
| "Working Overtime" | New Order | Waiting for the Sirens' Call | 2005 | |
| "World" (Note: The single version is titled "World (The Price of Love)".) | New Order; Stephen Hague ‡ | Republic | 1993 | |
| "World in Motion..." (Note: Band is credited as "Englandneworder") | New Order; Keith Allen ‡ | Non-album single | 1990 | |
| "Young Offender" | New Order; Stephen Hague ‡ | Republic | 1993 | |
| "Your Silent Face" | New Order | Power, Corruption & Lies | 1983 | |
