= Low-Life =

- UK vinyl and CD cover

Studio album by New Order
- Released: 13 May 1985
- Recorded: 1984
- Studios: Jam and Britannia Row, London
- Genres: Synth-pop; dance-pop; post-punk
- Length: 40:05
- Label: Factory
- Producer: New Order

New Order chronology
Power, Corruption & Lies (1983)	Low-Life (1985)	Brotherhood (1986)

Singles from Low-Life
- 1. "The Perfect Kiss" Released: 20 May 1985; 2. "Sub-culture" Released: 28 October 1985

Low-Life is the third studio album by English rock band New Order, released on 13 May 1985 by Factory Records. It is considered to be among the band's strongest work, displaying the moment they completed their transformation from post-punk to dance-rock. The album shows New Order's increased incorporation of synthesisers and samplers, while still preserving the rock elements of their earlier work. The original Factory CD issues of the album were mastered with pre-emphasis.

The songs on this album formed the basis of the band's live concert video Pumped Full of Drugs, filmed in Tokyo shortly before the album's release. The music video for "The Perfect Kiss" was directed by Jonathan Demme.

== Artwork ==
The album's artwork is the only New Order release to feature photographs of the band members on its cover; according to designer Peter Saville, the decision to do this was due to him growing tired of his previous "concept covers." To photograph the band, Saville took portraits of them with instant film, which he saw as more versatile than conventional 135 film, stating that "you could push it and do funny things with it. It was very graphic and very dynamic. The grain and the texture made everything look like a movie film." Saville further stated that the band were initially reluctant to depict themselves in the artwork; however, thanks in part to the rapid turnaround of instant film, they grew to enjoy the photoshoot after seeing the results. The CD version of the album comes packaged with drummer/keyboardist Stephen Morris on the front cover, while inside the case are four photographs and a semi-transparent piece of paper with the band's name, allowing consumers to choose which band member is seen through the sleeve.

== Singles and re-releases ==
On 20 May 1985, the full-length version of "The Perfect Kiss" was released as a single (an edited version of the song appears on the album). John Robie's remix of "Sub-culture" was also released as a 12″ single. Both of these extended versions eventually were included on 1987's Substance.

In 2008, the album was re-released in a Collector's Edition with a bonus disc, including the 17-minute complete version of "Elegia", which was only previously available on a limited edition disc of the 2002 box set Retro and, for the first time in digital format, the unedited 12″ mix of "The Perfect Kiss".

In 2023, the album was re-released as the Definitive Edition, featuring bonus CDs and DVDs with previously unreleased content.

On 5 December 2025, a Blu-ray audio edition of Low-Life featuring three mixes was released. The 2023 digital remaster, part of the Definitive box-set, a Dolby Atmos 5.1 surround sound stereo mix produced by Steven Wilson in 2024, alongside instrumental versions of the newly produced mixes.

== Reception ==
Professional ratings
Review scores
Source	Rating
AllMusic	4.5/5 stars
The A.V. Club	A−
Blender	5/5 stars
Entertainment Weekly	A−
Pitchfork	9.0/10
Q	5/5 stars
The Rolling Stone Album Guide	3.5/5 stars
Select	5/5
Uncut	5/5 stars
The Village Voice	B+

In a contemporary review of Low-Life for the Los Angeles Times, Richard Cromelin stated that New Order's "varied menu of soul-pop, techno-rock, delicate instrumental moods, and driving, clattering percussion offers adventure in texture at every turn", and that while the album does not contain "anything as transcendent" as "Love Will Tear Us Apart" by New Order's precursor Joy Division, "its confidence and imagination suggest that the possibility is still there." Robert Christgau of The Village Voice noted New Order's attempt to insert some "affect" into its music and wrote that the band "has its heart (or a reasonable facsimile thereof) in the right place, so one doesn't want to quibble." While panning "Love Vigilantes" as "an appallingly naive self-parody", Steve Sutherland of Melody Maker found that the remainder of the album "boasts the most articulate sound since The Cocteaus' Treasure, elevating depression to ecstasy." Giving it an 8 out of 10 rating, Smash Hits Neil Tennant found it to be New Order's best work: "the songs are much stronger than usual - not just doomy electronic workouts but memorable melodies with a sense of humour lurking in the words."

John Bush of AllMusic wrote that Low-Life was "in every way, the artistic equal" of New Order's previous album Power, Corruption & Lies, as well as "the point where the band's fusion of rock and electronics became seamless". The A.V. Club's Josh Modell similarly noted that the album "completely locked the disco influences into sync with New Order's pop leanings". David Quantick, writing in Uncut, felt that Low-Life was "the first New Order album that sounds like an album", with Bernard Sumner's "most human lyrics" complementing Gillian Gilbert and Stephen Morris' "pop axis" and Peter Hook's "breath-taking" bass performances. In 2000, Q magazine placed Low-Life at number 97 on its list of the "100 Greatest British Albums Ever". Low-Life was included in the book 1001 Albums You Must Hear Before You Die.

== Track listing ==
All tracks are written by Bernard Sumner, Peter Hook, Stephen Morris, Gillian Gilbert, except where noted.

Side one
No.	Title	Length
1.	"Love Vigilantes"	4:16
2.	"The Perfect Kiss"	4:51
3.	"This Time of Night"	4:45
4.	"Sunrise"	6:01

Side two
No.	Title	Length
1.	"Elegia"	4:56
2.	"Sooner Than You Think"	5:12
3.	"Sub-culture"	4:58
4.	"Face Up"	5:02
Total length:		40:05

2008 collector's edition bonus disc
No.	Title	Writer(s)	Length
1.	"The Perfect Kiss" (12″ version)		8:49
2.	"Sub-culture" (John Robie remix)		7:27
3.	"Shellshock" (Substance edit)	John Robie, Sumner, Hook, Morris, Gilbert	6:28
4.	"Shame of the Nation" (12″ version)	Robie, Sumner, Hook, Morris, Gilbert	7:55
5.	"Elegia" (Full Version)		17:29
6.	"Let's Go" (From the Salvation! soundtrack)		3:44
7.	"Salvation Theme" (From the Salvation! soundtrack)		2:18
8.	"Dub Vulture"		7:57
Total length:			62:08

=== 2023 Definitive Edition ===
Released on 27 January 2023, the Definitive Edition of Low-Life featured the original album on vinyl and a digitally mastered CD, mixed by Frank Arkwright. A second CD of unreleased material from the album recording sessions, two DVDs of live concerts and performances during 1985, and a book documenting the album production.

Remastered pressings of 12" singles "Sub-culture", "Shellshock", and two editions of "The Perfect Kiss" were also made available for purchase on the band's webstore.

Three promotional singles; "The Perfect Kiss (Writing Session Recording)", "Love Vigilantes (TV Pitch Instrumental Edit)", and "Skullcrusher (Demo)" were all published to digital music services preceding the boxsets release.

On 5 December 2025, Low-Life was reissued on CD featuring both the original album and the bonus disc found in the Definitive set, marking the first time any additional material from the Definitive series was available to purchase outside of the box set.

2023 definitive edition bonus disc
No.	Title	Length
1.	"Love Vigilantes" (TV Pitch Instrumental Edit)	6:14
2.	"The Perfect Kiss" (Writing Session Recording)	3:17
3.	"Untitled 1" (Writing Session Recording)	1:30
4.	"Sunrise" (Instrumental Rough Mix)	5:48
5.	"Elegia" (Full Length Version)	17:30
6.	"Sooner Than You Think" (Full Length Version)	6:24
7.	"Sub-Culture" (Album Session Instrumental)	6:07
8.	"Face Up" (Writing Session Recording)	3:34
9.	"Let's Go" (Album Session Instrumental)	4:14
10.	"Untitled 2" (Writing Session Recording)	5:53
11.	"Sunrise" (Writing Session Recording)	4:32
12.	"Love Vigilantes" (Writing Session Recording)	4:18
13.	"Sooner Than You Think" (Writing Session Recording)	3:04
14.	"Skullcrusher" (Demo)	5:37
Total length:		78:10

2023 Definitive Edition bonus DVD 1

Live at The Koseinenkin Hall, Tokyo, Japan, 1985
No.	Title	Writer(s)	Length
1.	"Confusion"	Arthur Baker, Sumner, Hook, Morris, Gilbert	8:04
2.	"Love Vigilantes"		4:32
3.	"We All Stand"		4:46
4.	"As It Is When It Was"		4:55
5.	"Sub-Culture"		4:58
6.	"Face Up"		5:30
7.	"Sunrise"		7:12
8.	"This Time of Night"		4:54
9.	"Blue Monday"		8:51

Live at The Rotterdam Arena, Netherlands, 1985
No.	Title	Writer(s)	Length
1.	"As It Is When It Was"		4:09
2.	"Everything's Gone Green"		3:58
3.	"Sub-Culture"		5:00
4.	"Ceremony"	Ian Curtis, Sumner, Hook, Morris	4:43
5.	"Let's Go"		4:21
6.	"This Time of Night"		5:58
7.	"The Village"		5:07
8.	"The Perfect Kiss"		9:29
9.	"Age of Consent"		4:59
10.	"Sunrise"		5:39
11.	"Temptation"		6:55
12.	"Face Up"		6:30

Live on Whistle Test for The Haçienda, 1985
No.	Title	Length
1.	"As It Is When It Was"	3:48
2.	"Sunrise"	5:18
3.	"Face Up"	5:19
Total length:		134:55

2023 Definitive Edition bonus DVD 2

Live at The Manhattan Club, Leuven, Belgium, 1985
No.	Title	Writer(s)	Length
1.	"Let's Go"		4:45
2.	"The Perfect Kiss"		9:13
3.	"Age of Consent"		5:00
4.	"State of the Nation"		6:29
5.	"As It Is When It Was"		3:50
6.	"The Village"		4:31
7.	"Sub-Culture"		5:14
8.	"Atmosphere"	Curtis, Sumner, Hook, Morris	4:42
9.	"Blue Monday"		8:03

Bonus Tracks (Live at The Manhattan Club, 1985)
No.	Title	Writer(s)	Length
1.	"Thieves Like Us"	Baker, Sumner, Hook, Morris, Gilbert	6:20
2.	"Temptation"		7:24
3.	"Confusion"	Baker, Sumner, Hook, Morris, Gilbert	5:39

Live at The International Centre, Toronto, Canada, 1985
No.	Title	Writer(s)	Length
1.	"Elegia"		6:39
2.	"Sub-Culture"		5:05
3.	"The Village"		4:20
4.	"Sunrise"		5:06
5.	"We All Stand"		4:14
6.	"As It Is When It Was"		3:53
7.	"Love Vigilantes"		5:06
8.	"5 8 6"		5:48
9.	"Age of Consent"		4:49
10.	"Temptation"		7:35
11.	"Ceremony"	Curtis, Sumner, Hook, Morris	5:51
12.	"The Perfect Kiss"		10:00

The Perfect Film (directed by Jonathan Demme)
No.	Title	Length
1.	"The Perfect Kiss"	10:36
Total length:		150:12

== Personnel ==
Credits adapted from the liner notes of Low-Life.

- New Order – production
- Michael Johnson – engineering
- Mark, Penny and Tim – tape operators
- Trevor Key – photography
- Peter Saville Associates – design

== Charts ==
1986 chart performance for Low-Life
Chart (1985)	Peak position
Australian Albums (Kent Music Report)	70
Canada Top Albums/CDs (RPM)	26
Dutch Albums (Album Top 100)	34
European Albums (Music & Media)	41
New Zealand Albums (RMNZ)	11
Swedish Albums (Sverigetopplistan)	20
UK Albums (Official Charts)	7
UK Independent Albums (MRIB)	1
US Billboard 200	94

2025 chart performance for Low-Life
Chart (2025)	Peak position
Hungarian Physical Albums (MAHASZ)	18

== Certifications ==
Certifications for Low-Life
Region	Certification	Certified units/sales
Canada (Music Canada)	Gold	50,000^{^}
United Kingdom (BPI)	Silver	60,000^{‡}
^{^} Shipments figures based on certification alone.^{‡} Sales+streaming figures based on certification alone.

== Release history ==
- UK LP – Factory Records (FACT 100)
- UK CD – Factory Records (FACD 100)
- UK cassette – Factory Records (FACT 100C)
- US LP – Qwest Records (25289-1)
- US cassette – Qwest Records (9 25289-4)
- UK CD (1993 re-release) – London Records (520 020-2)
