= Singles (New Order album) =

Compilation album by New Order
- Released: 3 October 2005
- Recorded: 1980–2005
- Length: 133:32
- Label: London
- Producers: Arthur Baker; The Chemical Brothers; Stephen Hague; Martin Hannett; Quincy Jones; John Leckie; New Order; John Potoker; Stuart Price; John Robie; Stephen Street

New Order chronology
Waiting for the Sirens' Call (2005)	Singles (2005)	iTunes Originals – New Order (2007)

Professional ratings
Review scores
Source	Rating
AllMusic	3.5/5 stars
NME	9/10
Pitchfork	8.3/10
Stylus Magazine	A

Singles is a compilation by English band New Order. It was released on 3 October 2005 by London Records. The two-disc compilation includes the band's singles released between 1981 and 2005. Unlike the CD version of earlier singles compilation Substance 1987, the B-sides are not included. While Substance 1987 aimed to showcase New Order's 12-inch singles, Singles instead features mostly seven-inch versions, some of which are rare and differ from the album versions.

The album includes three early singles that have never appeared on CD in their original form: "Ceremony", "Everything's Gone Green" and "Temptation". Additionally, an edit of the "Rough mix" of the song "Confusion" was created exclusively for this compilation. One song, "Turn", was released on this album in a new edited form, despite never having been a single.

An updated edition of Singles was released on 9 September 2016, which adds "I'll Stay with You" from the 2013 album Lost Sirens and replaces the versions of "1963", "Run 2", "Bizarre Love Triangle", "True Faith", "Spooky", "Confusion", and "The Perfect Kiss". The reissue was remastered by Frank Arkwright, and fixes the compression issues prevalent on the 2005 version.

== Track listing ==
- All songs written and produced by New Order, except where noted.
- All songs not otherwise indicated are album versions, including "Run 2" which is mislabelled.

Disc one
No.	Title	Writer(s)	Producer(s)	Length
1.	"Ceremony" (original version)	Joy Division	Martin Hannett	4:39
2.	"Procession"		Hannett	4:29
3.	"Everything's Gone Green" (7″ version)		Hannett	4:10
4.	"Temptation" (7″ version)			5:24
5.	"Blue Monday" (12″ version)			7:27
6.	"Confusion" (Rough Mix Edit)	New Order; Arthur Baker	Baker; New Order	4:56
7.	"Thieves Like Us" (7″ version)	New Order; Baker		3:57
8.	"The Perfect Kiss"			4:51
9.	"Sub-culture" (7″ version)			3:27
10.	"Shellshock" (7" version)	New Order; John Robie	Robie; New Order	4:24
11.	"State of the Nation" (7" version)			3:32
12.	"Bizarre Love Triangle"			4:22
13.	"True Faith" (12″ version)	New Order; Stephen Hague	Hague; New Order	5:54
14.	"1963" (alternate mix of "1963-94")	New Order; Hague	Hague; New Order	4:21
15.	"Touched by the Hand of God" (7" version)			3:44

Disc two
No.	Title	Writer(s)	Producer(s)	Length
1.	"Blue Monday 1988" (7″ version)		New Order; Quincy Jones^{[a]}; John Potoker^{[b]}	4:09
2.	"Fine Time" (7″ version)			3:10
3.	"Round & Round" (7″ version)			4:00
4.	"Run" (incorrectly credited as "Run 2")	New Order; John Denver		4:31
5.	"World in Motion" (single mix)	New Order; Keith Allen	Hague	4:32
6.	"Regret"	New Order; Hague	Hague; New Order	4:10
7.	"Ruined in a Day" (radio edit)		Hague; New Order	3:59
8.	"World (The Price of Love)" (radio edit)		Hague; New Order	3:40
9.	"Spooky" (radio edit)	New Order; Hague	Hague; New Order	3:45
10.	"Crystal" (radio edit)		Steve Osborne	4:21
11.	"60 Miles an Hour" (radio edit)		Osborne	3:50
12.	"Here to Stay" (radio edit)		The Chemical Brothers; New Order	3:57
13.	"Krafty" (single edit)		New Order; John Leckie	3:47
14.	"Jetstream" (radio edit)	New Order; Ana Lynch; Stuart Price	Price; New Order	3:44
15.	"Waiting for the Sirens' Call" (Rich Costey radio edit)		New Order; Jim Spencer	3:52
16.	"Turn" (edit)		New Order; Stephen Street	4:13

Disc two – US edition bonus track
No.	Title	Length
17.	"Temptation" (Secret Machines Remix)	4:37

Disc two – Japanese edition bonus tracks
No.	Title	Length
17.	"Everything's Gone Green" (Cicada Mix)	4:34
18.	"Bizarre Love Triangle" (Richard X Remix)	4:20

=== 2016 reissue ===
- All songs written and produced by New Order, except where noted.
- All songs not otherwise indicated are album versions.

Disc one
No.	Title	Writer(s)	Producer(s)	Length
1.	"Ceremony" (original version)	Joy Division	Hannett	4:39
2.	"Procession"		Hannett	4:29
3.	"Everything's Gone Green" (7″ version)		Hannett	4:10
4.	"Temptation" (7″ original version)			5:24
5.	"Blue Monday" (12″ version)			7:27
6.	"Confusion" (UK 7″ promo edit)	New Order; Baker	Baker; New Order	4:09
7.	"Thieves Like Us" (7″ edit)	New Order; Baker		3:57
8.	"The Perfect Kiss" (US 7″ edit)			4:25
9.	"Sub-culture" (7″ edit version)			3:27
10.	"Shellshock" (single version)	New Order; Robie	Robie; New Order	4:24
11.	"State of the Nation" (edit)			3:32
12.	"Bizarre Love Triangle" (7″ remix edit)		New Order; Shep Pettibone^{[b]}	3:43
13.	"True Faith" (7″ edit)	New Order; Hague	Hague; New Order	4:02
14.	"Touched by the Hand of God" (single version)			3:44
15.	"Blue Monday 1988" (7″ version)		New Order; Jones^{[a]}; Potoker^{[b]}	4:09

Disc two
No.	Title	Writer(s)	Producer(s)	Length
1.	"Fine Time" (7″ edit)			3:10
2.	"Round & Round" (7″ version)			4:00
3.	"Run 2" (7″ remix edit)	New Order; Denver	New Order; Scott Litt^{[b]}	3:38
4.	"World in Motion" (single version)	New Order; Allen	Hague	4:32
5.	"Regret"	New Order; Hague	Hague; New Order	4:10
6.	"Ruined in a Day" (radio edit)		Hague; New Order	3:59
7.	"World (The Price of Love)" (radio edit)		Hague; New Order	3:40
8.	"Spooky" (minimix)	New Order; Hague	Hague; New Order; Fluke^{[b]}	3:51
9.	"Nineteen63" (Arthur Baker radio remix)	New Order; Hague	Hague; New Order; Baker^{[b]}	4:03
10.	"Crystal" (radio edit)		Osborne	4:21
11.	"60 Miles an Hour" (radio edit)		Osborne	3:50
12.	"Here to Stay" (radio edit)		The Chemical Brothers; New Order	3:57
13.	"Krafty" (single edit)		New Order; Leckie	3:47
14.	"Jetstream" (radio edit)	New Order; Lynch; Price	Price; New Order	3:44
15.	"Waiting for the Sirens' Call" (Rich Costey radio edit)		New Order; Spencer	3:52
16.	"Turn" (Stephen Street edit)		New Order; Street	4:13
17.	"I'll Stay with You"		New Order; Spencer	4:22

Notes

- ^{^a} signifies a remix production supervisor
- ^{^b} signifies a remixer

== Charts ==
Chart performance for Singles
Chart (2005–2006)	Peak position
Australian Albums (ARIA)	117
Irish Albums (IRMA)	54
Japanese Albums (Oricon)	85
Scottish Albums (Official Charts)	15
UK Albums (Official Charts)	14
US Top Dance Albums (Billboard)	12
