= Brotherhood (New Order album) =

Studio album by New Order
- Released: 29 September 1986
- Recorded: 1986
- Studios: Jam (London); Windmill Lane (Dublin); Amazon (Liverpool)
- Genres: Post-punk; synth-pop
- Length: 37:07
- Label: Factory
- Producer: New Order

New Order chronology
| Low-Life (1985) | Brotherhood (1986) | Substance (1987) |

Singles from Brotherhood
- 1. "State of the Nation" Released: 15 September 1986; 2. "Bizarre Love Triangle" Released: 3 November 1986

Brotherhood is the fourth studio album by the English rock band New Order, released on 29 September 1986 by Factory Records. It contains a mixture of post-punk and electronic styles, roughly divided between the two sides. The album includes "Bizarre Love Triangle", the band's breakthrough single in the United States and Australia; it was the only track from the album released as a single and as a video (although "State of the Nation" was added to most CD editions).

The album sleeve, created by Peter Saville, is a photograph of a sheet of titanium–zinc alloy. Some early releases came in a metallic sleeve.

== Music ==
Brotherhood saw the band further exploring their mix of post-punk and electronic styles, with the track listing being conceptually divided into "disco and rock sides". Stephen Morris stated that the album "was kind of done in a schizophrenic mood that we were trying to do one side synthesizers and one side guitars", which he retrospectively stated "didn't quite work".

In a 1987 interview with Option, Morris commented that the "mad ending" to "Every Little Counts" – which sounds like a vinyl record needle skipping the groove – is similar to the ending of the Beatles' "A Day in the Life". Morris said: "What we should have done is make the tape version sound like the tape getting chewed up. The CD could have the sticking sound."

Influences of Richard Wagner's "Prelude" to Das Rheingold can be heard throughout the track "All Day Long." New Order have subsequently used the piece as a concert opener.

== Critical reception ==
Professional ratings
Review scores
| Source | Rating |
|---|---|
| AllMusic | 4/5 stars |
| The A.V. Club | A− |
| Blender | 5/5 stars |
| Entertainment Weekly | A− |
| Pitchfork | 9.5/10 |
| Q | 3/5 stars |
| The Rolling Stone Album Guide | 4/5 stars |
| Select | 3/5 |
| Uncut | 4/5 stars |
| The Village Voice | A |

Reviewing Brotherhood for the Los Angeles Times, Steve Hochman wrote that New Order "makes atmospheric grooves with more finesse than any contemporary computer-rocker." In his "Consumer Guide" column for The Village Voice, Robert Christgau selected the album as a "pick hit" and said: "The tempos are a touch less stately, the hooks a touch less subliminal. Bernard Albrecht's vocals have taken on so much affect they're humane. And the joke closer softens up a skeptic like me to the pure, physically exalting sensation of the music."

In a 1993 retrospective review, Q critic Stuart Maconie described Brotherhood as "often overlooked, nestling as it does between two superior studio albums", and ultimately "more for the initiated than the first-time buyer." John Bush of AllMusic was more favourable, writing that "for better and worse, this was a New Order with nothing more to prove – witness the tossed-off lyrics and giggles on 'Every Little Counts' – aside from continuing to make great music." David Quantick of Uncut noted "an increased tension between the frequent beauty of the music and the band's Northern self-consciousness" and concluded: "This was New Order becoming New Order and if anyone was entitled to not be Joy Division, they certainly were." The A.V. Club's Josh Modell called Brotherhood "an unsung great of the catalog that's dwarfed a bit by its massive single".

== Track listing ==
All tracks are written by Bernard Sumner, Peter Hook, Stephen Morris, Gillian Gilbert, except where noted.

Side one
| No. | Title | Length |
|---|---|---|
| 1. | "Paradise" | 3:50 |
| 2. | "Weirdo" | 3:52 |
| 3. | "As It Is When It Was" | 3:46 |
| 4. | "Broken Promise" | 3:47 |
| 5. | "Way of Life" | 4:06 |

Side two
| No. | Title | Length |
|---|---|---|
| 6. | "Bizarre Love Triangle" | 4:22 |
| 7. | "All Day Long" | 5:12 |
| 8. | "Angel Dust" | 3:44 |
| 9. | "Every Little Counts" | 4:28 |
| Total length: | | 37:07 |

CD edition bonus track
| No. | Title | Length |
|---|---|---|
| 10. | "State of the Nation" | 6:32 |
| Total length: | | 43:39 |

Notes

- Most CD copies, with the sole exception of Qwest Records' 1988 release, feature the 12" version of "State of the Nation" as a bonus track (although it is not listed as such). It is identical to the version found on Substance. It runs for 6:32, making the album's new total running time approximately 43:39.

2008 Collector's Edition bonus disc
| No. | Title | Writer(s) | Length |
|---|---|---|---|
| 1. | "Bizarre Love Triangle" (Shep Pettibone Remix) | | 6:44 |
| 2. | "1963" | Stephen Hague, Sumner, Hook, Morris, Gilbert | 5:32 |
| 3. | "True Faith" (Shep Pettibone Remix) | Hague, Sumner, Hook, Morris, Gilbert | 9:02 |
| 4. | "Touched by the Hand of God" | | 7:05 |
| 5. | "Blue Monday '88" | | 7:07 |
| 6. | "Evil Dust" | | 3:45 |
| 7. | "True Faith" (Eschreamer Dub) (incorrectly listed as "True Faith (True Dub)") | Hague, Sumner, Hook, Morris, Gilbert | 7:52 |
| 8. | "Blue Monday '88" (Dub) (incorrectly listed as "Beach Buggy") | | 7:18 |
| Total length: | | | 54:25 |

Notes

- "True Faith" (Eschreamer Dub) and "Blue Monday '88" (Dub) are only incorrectly listed on the disc itself. The booklet included with all five re-issued 2008 Collector's Edition New Order Factory Records studio albums correctly identifies them. (Note: The booklets to the 2008 UK reissues do not contain track listings for the second CDs.)

=== 2024 Definitive Edition ===
Announced on 4 September 2024, and released on 22 November 2024, Brotherhood was released as a part of the Definitive series. The box set featured a newly remastered LP and CD of the original album; an additional CD of demos, remixes, and rare tracks; two DVDs of live performances, broadcasts, and a documentary made by Stephen Morris. The box set also featured a book about the production of the album.

Alongside the release of the box-set, repressed 12" singles "Bizarre Love Triangle", "State of the Nation", and "Touched by the Hand of God" were issued.

Three songs featured on the bonus CD were added to streaming platforms before the release of the box set: "Blue Monday '88" (Michael Johnson 12" Mix), "Bizarre Love Triangle" (Stephen Hague 12" Remix), and "State of the Nation" (Japan Demo).

On 5 December 2025, Brotherhood was reissued on CD featuring both the original album and the bonus disc found in the Definitive set, marking the first time any additional material from the Definitive series was available to purchase outside of the box set. Additionally, a Blu-ray audio edition of Brotherhood was released, featuring Dolby Atmos and 5.1 surround sound mixes by Steven Wilson, the 2024 stereo remaster from the Definitive boxed set, and instrumental versions of the newly-produced mixes.

2024 Definitive Edition bonus disc
| No. | Title | Length |
|---|---|---|
| 1. | "Shellshock" (AOR Version) | 6:00 |
| 2. | "State of the Nation" (Japan Demo) | 7:07 |
| 3. | "Paradise" (Robert Racic Mix) | 6:40 |
| 4. | "As It Is When It Was" (Japan Demo) | 3:31 |
| 5. | "Broken Promise" (Instrumental) | 3:46 |
| 6. | "Bizarre Love Triangle" (Stephen Hague 12" Mix) | 5:47 |
| 7. | "All Day Long" (Instrumental) | 5:33 |
| 8. | "Evil Dust" | 3:42 |
| 9. | "Every Little Counts" (Full Length) | 5:17 |
| 10. | "Salvation Theme" | 2:14 |
| 11. | "Skullcrusher" (Full Length) | 3:56 |
| 12. | "Touched by the Hand of God" (Salvation Version) | 5:02 |
| 13. | "Let's Go" (Salvation Version) | 3:44 |
| 14. | "Sputnik" | 2:32 |
| 15. | "Blue Monday '88" (Michael Johnson 12" Mix) | 7:33 |
| Total length: | | 72:24 |

2024 Definitive Edition bonus DVD 1

Live at Brixton Academy, London, 1987
| No. | Title | Writer(s) | Length |
|---|---|---|---|
| 1. | "Bizarre Love Triangle" | | 4:24 |
| 2. | "The Perfect Kiss" | | 9:06 |
| 3. | "Ceremony" | Ian Curtis, Sumner, Hook, Morris | 4:23 |
| 4. | "Dreams Never End" | | 3:02 |
| 5. | "Love Vigilantes" | | 4:20 |
| 6. | "Confusion" | Arthur Baker, Sumner, Hook, Morris, Gilbert | 5:07 |
| 7. | "Age of Consent" | | 5:13 |
| 8. | "Temptation" | | 9:27 |

Academy VHS, 1987
| No. | Title | Length |
|---|---|---|
| 1. | "Interviews" | 6:19 |

Live on BBC NI, 1986
| No. | Title | Writer(s) | Length |
|---|---|---|---|
| 1. | "Ceremony" | Curtis, Sumner, Hook, Morris | 4:55 |
| 2. | "Love Will Tear Us Apart" | Curtis, Sumner, Hook, Morris | 3:33 |

Live on The Tube. 1986
| No. | Title | Length |
|---|---|---|
| 1. | "State of the Nation" | 6:51 |
| 2. | "Broken Promise" | 3:56 |

Live on Top of the Pops, 1987
| No. | Title | Writer(s) | Length |
|---|---|---|---|
| 1. | "True Faith" | Hague, Sumner, Hook, Morris, Gilbert | 4:04 |

Live on Les Enfants du Rock, 1987
| No. | Title | Length |
|---|---|---|
| 1. | "Paradise" | 4:00 |

Live on Rockline, 1987
| No. | Title | Length |
|---|---|---|
| 1. | "Bizarre Love Triangle" | 4:25 |

Live on The Roxy, 1987
| No. | Title | Writer(s) | Length |
|---|---|---|---|
| 1. | "True Faith" | Hague, Sumner, Hook, Morris, Gilbert | 3:46 |

Live on Japanese TV
| No. | Title | Length |
|---|---|---|
| 1. | "Bizarre Love Triangle" | 4:23 |

Japanese Studio Footage, Denon Studios, Tokyo, 1985
| No. | Title | Length |
|---|---|---|
| 1. | "Recording 'As It Is When It Was' & 'State of the Nation'" | 19:29 |
| Total length: | | 110:43 |

2024 Definitive Edition bonus DVD 2

Live at GMEX, Manchester, 1986
| No. | Title | Writer(s) | Length |
|---|---|---|---|
| 1. | "Elegia" | | 6:37 |
| 2. | "Shellshock" | John Robie, Sumner, Hook, Morris, Gilbert | 6:17 |
| 3. | "Paradise" | | 4:24 |
| 4. | "Bizarre Love Triangle" | | 4:43 |
| 5. | "Way of Life" | | 4:09 |
| 6. | "State of the Nation" | | 6:52 |
| 7. | "Face Up" | | 5:55 |
| 8. | "The Perfect Kiss" | | 9:28 |
| 9. | "Ceremony" (with Ian McCulloch) | Curtis, Sumner, Hook, Morris | 6:14 |
| 10. | "Temptation" | | 8:11 |

Live at Glastonbury Festival, 1987
| No. | Title | Writer(s) | Length |
|---|---|---|---|
| 1. | "True Faith" | Hague, Sumner, Hook, Morris, Gilbert | 5:47 |
| 2. | "Sister Ray" | Lou Reed, John Cale, Maureen Tucker, Sterling Morrison | 9:43 |

Live in San Giovanni, 1986
| No. | Title | Length |
|---|---|---|
| 1. | "Dreams Never End" | 3:17 |

Live at Pier 84, New York, 1987
| No. | Title | Writer(s) | Length |
|---|---|---|---|
| 1. | "All Day Long" | | 4:03 |
| 2. | "Angel Dust" | | 3:43 |
| 3. | "Shellshock" | Robie, Sumner, Hook, Morris, Gilbert | 6:14 |
| 4. | "Weirdo" | | 3:39 |

Live at La Mutualité, Paris, 1987
| No. | Title | Writer(s) | Length |
|---|---|---|---|
| 1. | "True Faith" | Hague, Sumner, Hook, Morris, Gilbert | 4:29 |

Live at GMEX, Manchester, 1988
| No. | Title | Length |
|---|---|---|
| 1. | "Touched By The Hand of God" | 5:58 |
| 2. | "Every Little Counts" | 4:08 |
| Total length: | | 113:51 |

== Personnel ==
Credits adapted from the liner notes of Brotherhood.

- New Order – production
- Michael Johnson – engineering
- Peter Saville Associates – design
- Trevor Key – photography

== Charts ==
1986 chart performance for Brotherhood
| Chart (1986) | Peak position |
|---|---|
| Australian Albums (Kent Music Report) | 15 |
| Canada Top Albums/CDs (RPM) | 69 |
| European Albums (Music & Media) | 50 |
| New Zealand Albums (RMNZ) | 22 |
| Swedish Albums (Sverigetopplistan) | 33 |
| UK Albums (Official Charts) | 9 |
| UK Independent Albums (MRIB) | 1 |
| US Billboard 200 | 117 |

2025-2026 chart performance for Brotherhood
| Chart (2025-2026) | Peak position |
|---|---|
| Croatian International Albums (HDU) | 14 |
| Hungarian Physical Albums (MAHASZ) | 16 |
| Hungarian Vinyl Albums (MAHASZ) | 7 |

== Release history ==
- UK LP – Factory Records (FACT 150)
- UK CD – Factory Records (FACD 150)
- UK Music cassette – Factory Records (FACT 150C)
- US LP – Qwest (25511–1)
- US cassette – Qwest (9 25511–4)
- Canada CD – Factory Records / PolyGram (830,527-2)
- UK CD (1993 re-release) – London Records (520,021-2)
