= Substance 1987 =

1987 compilation album by New Order

Substance
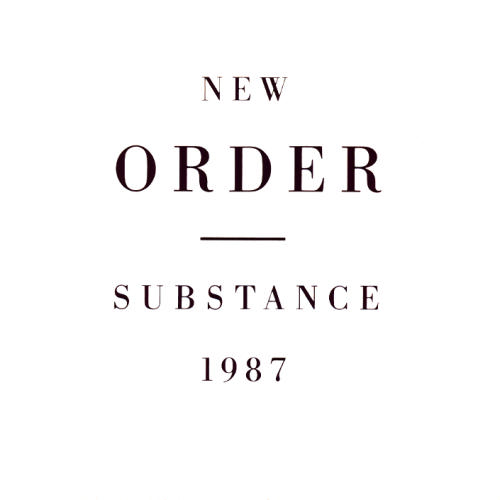

Compilation album by New Order
- Released: 17 August 1987
- Recorded: 1981–1987
- Genres: Dance-rock; alternative dance; post-punk; dance; pop
- Length: 74:44 (LP); 146:46 (CD and DAT); 183:45 (cassette)
- Label: Factory
- Producers: New Order; Martin Hannett; Arthur Baker; John Robie; Shep Pettibone; Stephen Hague

New Order chronology
Brotherhood (1986)	Substance (1987)	Technique (1989)

Singles from Substance
- 1. "True Faith" Released: 20 July 1987

Substance (also known as Substance 1987) is a compilation album by English alternative dance new wave band New Order. It was released in August 1987 by Factory Records. The album compiles all of the band's singles at that point in their 12-inch versions, along with their respective B-side tracks. The then-newly released non-album single "True Faith" is also featured, along with its B-side "1963" and new versions of "Temptation" and "Confusion".

Substance was released as a double LP (12 tracks), a double CD (24 tracks), a double cassette (24 or 28 tracks), a single cassette (12 tracks) in the U.S. and a digital audio tape (24 tracks). It sold over one million copies and became New Order's most popular and critically acclaimed album.

It is the companion to a similar singles compilation by New Order's predecessor band Joy Division, also entitled Substance.

The band's bassist Peter Hook claimed that the album was created because Factory Records' owner Tony Wilson bought a new Jaguar with a CD player built in and wanted all of New Order's hits on one CD.

== Songs ==
While Substance presents a sizeable collection of singles, there are many omissions and differences to be found from the original single releases:

- "Temptation" and "Confusion" were re-recorded in 1987 specifically for Substance and neither of the original versions appears.
- "Ceremony" is the version recorded after Gillian Gilbert joined the band. The original trio version – the first New Order recording following the dissolution of Joy Division – was initially released as a 7" single and reissued as a 12" two months later. The 7" version would not be re-released until the Singles collection in 2005 and the re-release of Movement in 2008.
- "The Perfect Kiss" (CD and DAT versions only), "Sub-culture", "Shellshock" and "Hurt" are all edited down from their original 12" recordings, the result of storage limitations of the CD, LP, and cassette formats.
- "Cries and Whispers" and "Mesh" are incorrectly labelled as one another, as was the case on the original sleeve for "Everything's Gone Green"; to add to the confusion, the iTunes Store release, based on the CD version, labels "Cries and Whispers" as "Mesh (Cries and Whispers)". This error was corrected for the digital release of the album on streaming services.
- "Sub-culture" is labelled as "Subculture", and "The Perfect Kiss" is labelled as "Perfect Kiss".

The standard tape version, due to the extra space befitting the format, also contains extra tracks in the form of "Dub-vulture", "Shellcock", and "Bizarre Dub Triangle", as well as the actual "Mesh" (mislabeled "Cries and Whispers", again identically to the "Everything's Gone Green" sleeve). Only on the limited edition cassette version does "True Dub" appear, as the last track on the second tape. This second tape, with a total play time of over 100 minutes, was exceptionally long for a commercial audio tape release at the time, which were generally no more than 80 minutes due to the increasing fragility of very thin magnetic tape. On all cassette versions, "Murder" is after "Thieves Like Us" on the first cassette, whereas on the CD/DAT versions it appears on the second half of the album.

== Release and reception ==
Professional ratings
Review scores
Source	Rating
AllMusic	5/5 stars
Blender	5/5 stars
Encyclopedia of Popular Music	4/5 stars
Los Angeles Times	3/4 stars
Q	4/5 stars
The Rolling Stone Album Guide	5/5 stars
Select	5/5
Spin Alternative Record Guide	10/10
Sputnikmusic	5/5
The Village Voice	A

Substance was released in August 1987 by Factory Records. According to Sputnikmusic, it showcased New Order's mix of post-punk and dance styles with 12-inch singles remixed for club play and became the band's "most popular, well known, highly rated [record] and arguably their most influential". In a contemporary review for The Village Voice, music critic Robert Christgau said that the album's vinyl edition showcases New Order's discipline and chemistry as a band whose musical style is improved upon by the 12-inch mixes: "Pure rhythm machine with an ironically mysterious overlay of schlocky melody to help it go down, this album is a case study in sensationalist art, and I say the world is better for it." Additionally, he called Substance "sublime" and "a revelation" in his column for Playboy. Christgau named it the eighth best album of 1987 in his list for the annual Pazz & Jop critics poll.

In 2003, Substance was ranked number 361 on Rolling Stone's list of the 500 greatest albums of all time. According to the magazine, it had sold over one million copies by that time. Rolling Stone ranked the album at 363 in the list's 2012 edition. In a retrospective review for AllMusic, Stephen Thomas Erlewine wrote that the album revealed the band's strength as songwriters with a few of the best pop songs from the 1980s represented by "Blue Monday", "Bizarre Love Triangle", "Temptation", and "True Faith". According to Erlewine, it has been argued that the 12-inch mixes on Substance "represent New Order's most groundbreaking and successful work, since they expanded the notion of what a rock & roll band, particularly an indie rock band, could do." Joe Gross wrote in The Rolling Stone Album Guide (2004) that the album is "pure pleasure" and serves as "a guidebook to 1980s pop", along with Prince's Purple Rain (1984) and Madonna's The Immaculate Collection (1990). Slant Magazine's Sal Cinquemani was less enthusiastic and said that the album is "undeniably a product of its time". In 2005, Will Hermes included Substance in his "definitive guide" to dance-rock for Spin magazine. In 2022, Classic Pop's Barry Page ranked it the fifth greatest compilation album of all time.

In November 2023, New Order re-released Substance in "digitally remastered" versions. In addition to double vinyl, double cd and double cassette formats, an expanded four CD version was also released, where CD three has alternate versions and extra b-sides, and CD four features an unreleased concert from 1987, where the band played the entire album in sequence.

== Track listing ==
=== LP version ===
All tracks are written by New Order (Peter Hook, Gillian Gilbert, Stephen Morris and Bernard Sumner), except where indicated.

Side one
No.	Title	Writer(s)	Length
1.	"Ceremony"	Joy Division	4:23
2.	"Everything's Gone Green"		5:30
3.	"Temptation (New Version)"		6:59
Total length:			16:52

Side two
No.	Title	Writer(s)	Length
4.	"Blue Monday"		7:29
5.	"Confusion (New Version)"	New Order, Arthur Baker	4:43
6.	"Thieves Like Us"	New Order, Arthur Baker	6:36
Total length:			18:48 (35:40)

Side three
No.	Title	Writer(s)	Length
7.	"The Perfect Kiss"		8:46
8.	"Sub-culture"		4:48
9.	"Shellshock"	New Order, John Robie	6:28
Total length:			20:02

Side four
No.	Title	Writer(s)	Length
10.	"State of the Nation"		6:32
11.	"Bizarre Love Triangle"		6:44
12.	"True Faith"	New Order, Stephen Hague	5:55
Total length:			19:02 (39:04) (74:44)

=== CD/DAT version ===
- Along with the vinyl edition's 12-inch singles compiled on disc one, the CD version included a second disc that collects the B-sides of those singles.

All tracks are written by New Order (Peter Hook, Gillian Gilbert, Stephen Morris and Bernard Sumner), except where indicated.

Disc one
No.	Title	Writer(s)	Length
1.	"Ceremony"	Joy Division	4:23
2.	"Everything's Gone Green"		5:30
3.	"Temptation"		6:59
4.	"Blue Monday"		7:29
5.	"Confusion"	New Order, Arthur Baker	4:43
6.	"Thieves Like Us"	New Order, Arthur Baker	6:36
7.	"The Perfect Kiss"		8:02
8.	"Sub-culture"		4:48
9.	"Shellshock"	New Order, John Robie	6:28
10.	"State of the Nation"		6:32
11.	"Bizarre Love Triangle"		6:44
12.	"True Faith"	New Order, Stephen Hague	5:55
Total length:			74:09

Disc two
No.	Title	Writer(s)	B-side to	Length
1.	"In a Lonely Place"	Joy Division	"Ceremony"	6:16
2.	"Procession"		(Note: "Procession" is included on the B-sides portion despite having originally been released as A-side. "Procession" is also unusual in the sense that it is the only song included on Substance to have never been released as part of a 12" single.)	4:27
3.	"Cries and Whispers" (incorrectly labeled as "Mesh")		"Everything's Gone Green"	3:25
4.	"Hurt"		"Temptation"	6:58
5.	"The Beach"		"Blue Monday"	7:19
6.	"Confusion Instrumental"	New Order, Arthur Baker	"Confusion"	7:38
7.	"Lonesome Tonight"		"Thieves Like Us"	5:11
8.	"Murder"		(Note: "Murder" is included on the B-sides portion despite having originally been released as A-side.)	3:55
9.	"Thieves Like Us" (instrumental)	New Order, Arthur Baker	"Murder"	6:57
10.	"The Kiss of Death"		"The Perfect Kiss"	7:02
11.	"Shame of the Nation"	New Order, John Robie	"State of the Nation"	7:54
12.	"1963"	New Order, Stephen Hague	"True Faith"	5:35
Total length:				72:37 (146:46)

=== Cassette version ===
All tracks are written by New Order (Peter Hook, Gillian Gilbert, Stephen Morris and Bernard Sumner), except where indicated.

Cassette one – Side one
No.	Title	Writer(s)	Length
1.	"Ceremony"	Joy Division	4:23
2.	"Everything's Gone Green"		5:30
3.	"Temptation"		6:59
4.	"Blue Monday"		7:29
5.	"Confusion"	New Order, Arthur Baker	4:43
6.	"Thieves Like Us"	New Order, Arthur Baker	6:36
7.	"Murder"		3:55
Total length:			39:35

Cassette one – Side two
No.	Title	Writer(s)	Length
8.	"The Perfect Kiss"		8:46
9.	"Sub-culture"		4:48
10.	"Shellshock"	New Order, John Robie	6:28
11.	"State of the Nation"		6:32
12.	"Bizarre Love Triangle"		6:44
13.	"True Faith"	New Order, Stephen Hague	5:55
Total length:			39:13 (78:48)

Cassette two – Side three
No.	Title	Writer(s)	B-side to	Length
1.	"In a Lonely Place"	Joy Division	"Ceremony"	6:16
2.	"Procession"			4:27
3.	"Mesh"		"Everything's Gone Green"	3:02
4.	"Cries and Whispers"		"Everything's Gone Green"	3:25
5.	"Hurt"		"Temptation"	6:58
6.	"The Beach"		"Blue Monday"	7:19
7.	"Confusion" (instrumental)	New Order, Arthur Baker	"Confusion"	7:38
8.	"Lonesome Tonight"		"Thieves Like Us"	5:11
9.	"Thieves Like Us" (instrumental)	New Order, Arthur Baker	"Murder"	6:57
Total length:				51:13

Cassette two – Side four
No.	Title	Writer(s)	B-side to	Length
10.	"The Kiss of Death"		"The Perfect Kiss"	7:02
11.	"Dub-vulture"		"Sub-culture"	7:57
12.	"Shellcock"	New Order, John Robie	"Shellshock"	7:35
13.	"Shame of the Nation"	New Order, Robie	"State of the Nation"	7:54
14.	"Bizarre Dub Triangle"		"Bizarre Love Triangle"	7:00
15.	"1963"	New Order, Stephen Hague	"True Faith"	5:35
16.	"True Dub"	New Order, Hague	"True Faith"	10:41
Total length:				53:44 (104:57) (183:45)

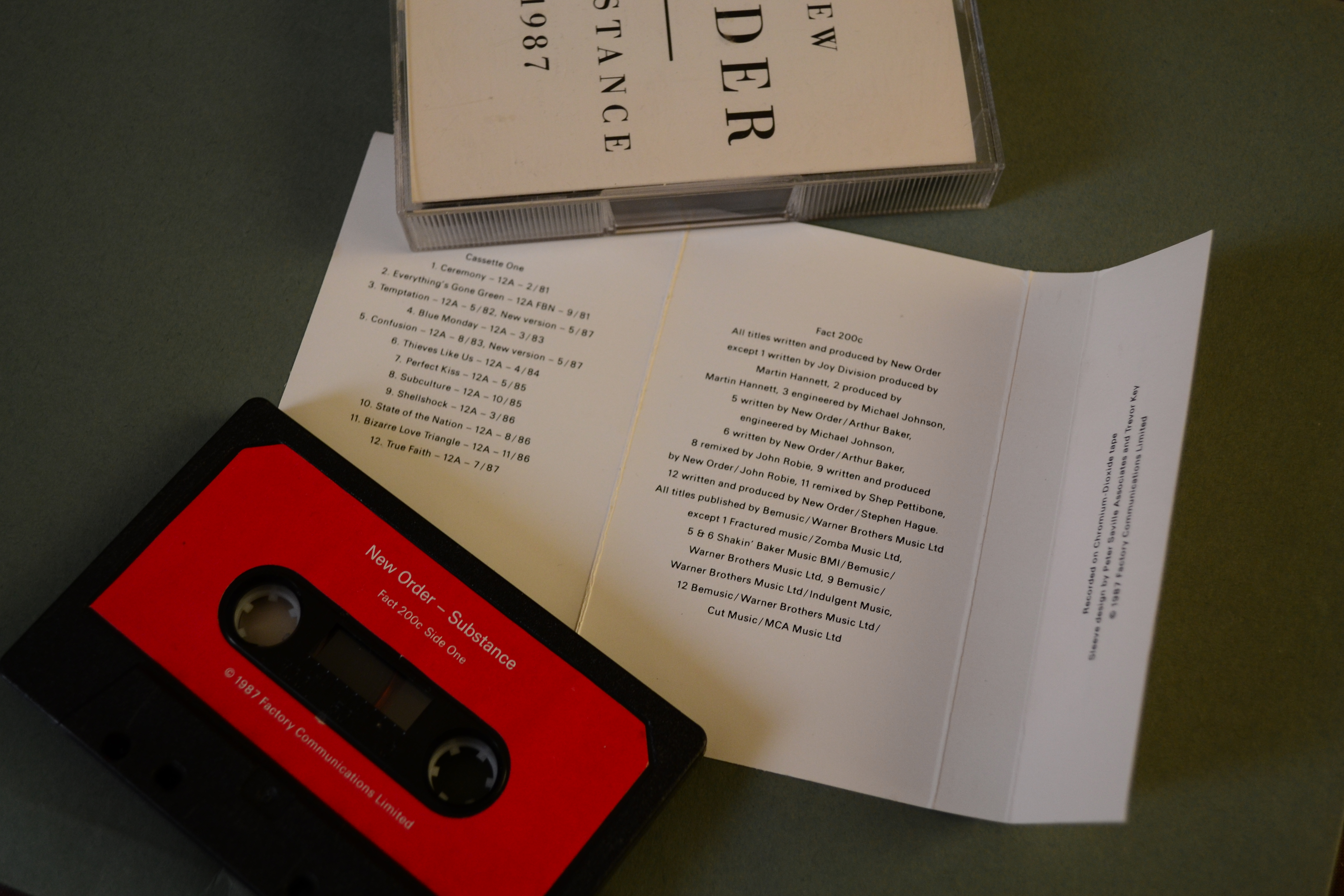
- New Order Substance 1987 Fact 200c Side One Inlay and Cassette
  Some releases only contain the first cassette, which compiles the single A-sides. These versions (including the USA Qwest Records release) do not include the song "Murder".
- Some releases
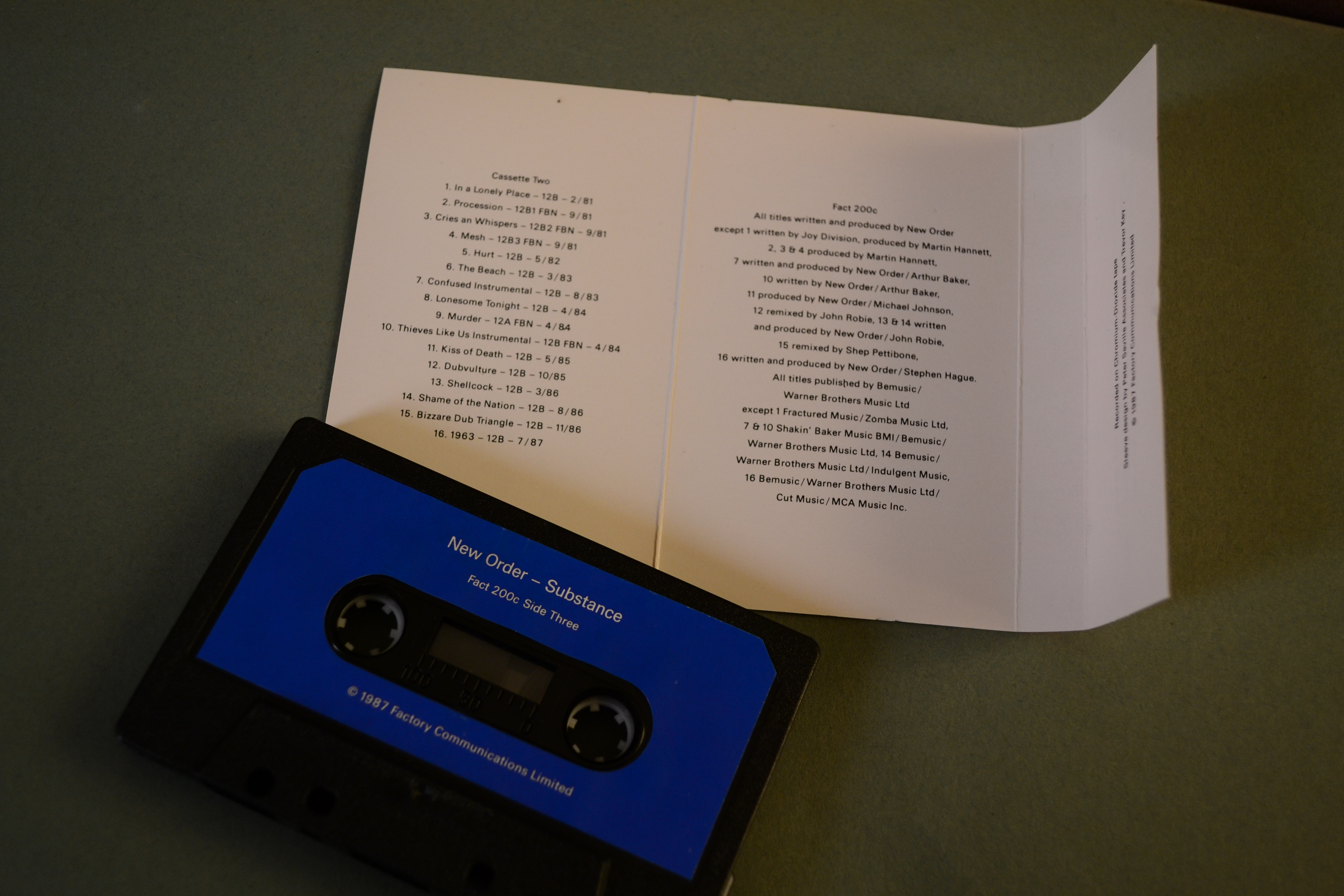
  New Order Substance 1987 Fact 200c Side Three Inlay and Cassette
  do contain the track "Murder" as Track 7 on the (red) tape (Fact 200c Side One / Side Two) but it is listed incorrectly on the inlay as Track 9 (between "Lonesome Tonight" and "Thieves Like Us Instrumental" on the B-sides tape, although it is not actually on the (blue) tape (Fact 200c Side Three / Side Four) . "Cries and Whispers" is also written as "Cries an Whispers" on the inside of the inlay, but spelled correctly on the panel visible when the Cassette is closed. This version concludes with the track "1963", not "True Dub".
- "Cries and Whispers" and "Mesh" are listed in the wrong order on the insert.

=== 2023 expanded reissue ===
The first two CDs are the same as the 1987 CDs, but remastered, except that "The Perfect Kiss" is now the unabridged 12-inch version (whereas "Sub-culture" and "Shellshock" remain the abridged 12-inch versions). According to the music streaming service Deezer, "Sub-culture", "Shellshock" and "Hurt" are labeled as "Substance Edit"; "Sub-culture" is also labeled as the "John Robie Remix". "Ceremony" is labeled as "Version 2" and "Bizarre Love Triangle" is labeled as the "Shep Pettibone Remix". Below track titles also taken from Deezer.

Disc three
No.	Title	Writer(s)	taken from	Length
1.	"Ceremony (Version 1)"	Joy Division	"Ceremony"	4:38
2.	"Mesh"		"Everything's Gone Green"	3:02
3.	"Temptation"		"Temptation"	8:51
4.	"Confusion"	New Order, Baker	"Confusion"	8:14
5.	"Perfect Pit"		"The Perfect Kiss"	1:24
6.	"Dub Vulture (John Robie Remix)"		"Sub-culture"	7:57
7.	"Shellcock"	New Order, Robie	"Shellshock"	7:35
8.	"Bizarre Dub Triangle (Shep Pettibone Remix)"		"Bizarre Love Triangle"	7:05
9.	"True Dub (Shep Pettibone Remix)"	New Order, Hague	"True Faith"	10:44
10.	"Confusion Dub '87"	New Order, Baker	"Touched by the Hand of God"	5:25
11.	"True Faith (Shep Pettibone Remix)"	New Order, Hague	"True Faith"	9:03
Total length:				73:58

Disc four: Live at Irvine Meadows California, September 12th, 1987
No.	Title	Writer(s)	Length
1.	"Ceremony"	Joy Division	5:19
2.	"Everything's Gone Green"		3:49
3.	"Temptation"		7:34
4.	"Blue Monday"		7:55
5.	"Confusion"	New Order, Baker	5:20
6.	"Thieves Like Us"		3:48
7.	"The Perfect Kiss"		8:35
8.	"Subculture"		5:03
9.	"Shellshock"	New Order, Robie	6:13
10.	"State of the Nation"		6:53
11.	"Bizarre Love Triangle"		4:34
12.	"True Faith"	New Order, Hague	5:13
Total length:			70:15

== Video release ==
Substance 1989

Video by New Order
- Released: 1989
- Recorded: 1983–1989
- Length: 40 minutes
- Labels: Virgin Music Video, Factory

New Order chronology
Academy (1989)	Substance 1989 (1989)	New Order Story (1993)

Professional ratings
Review scores
Source	Rating
AllMusic	5/5 stars

Substance 1989 is the video version of Substance that first appeared in 1989 on VHS; it was released on LaserDisc in Japan in 1991.

The cover is similar to the LP, except "1987" is replaced by "1989" (though the on-screen title is Substance 1983–88) and different background colours are used; the Factory/Qwest release has a grey background, the Japanese VHS release, blue and the LaserDisc, turquoise. The video includes linking sequences which are animated to the accompaniment of instrumental sections from "The Happy One", an otherwise unreleased track from the Technique sessions.

=== Video song listing ===
All tracks are written by New Order (Peter Hook, Gillian Gilbert, Stephen Morris and Bernard Sumner), except where noted.

Substance 1989 track listing
No.	Title	Writer(s)	Director	Length
1.	"Confusion"	New Order, Arthur Baker	Charles Sturridge	3:57
2.	"The Perfect Kiss"		Jonathan Demme	9:29
3.	"Shellshock"	New Order, John Robie	Rick Elgood	3:15
4.	"Bizarre Love Triangle"		Robert Longo	3:54
5.	"True Faith"	New Order, Stephen Hague	Philippe Decouflé	4:24
6.	"Touched by the Hand of God"		Kathryn Bigelow	4:19
7.	"Blue Monday 1988"		Robert Breer and William Wegman	4:07

== Charts ==
=== Weekly charts ===
1987–1988 weekly chart performance for Substance 1987
Chart (1987–1988)	Peak position
Australian Albums (Kent Music Report)	12
Canada Top Albums/CDs (RPM)	15
Dutch Albums (Album Top 100)	42
European Albums (Music & Media)	17
German Albums (Offizielle Top 100)	18
New Zealand Albums (RMNZ)	4
Swedish Albums (Sverigetopplistan)	49
Swiss Albums (Schweizer Hitparade)	10
UK Albums (Official Charts)	3
UK Independent Albums (MRIB)	1
US Billboard 200	36

2023 weekly chart performance for Substance 1987
Chart (2023)	Peak position
Austrian Albums (Ö3 Austria)	46
German Albums (Offizielle Top 100)	14
Hungarian Albums (MAHASZ)	18
Spanish Albums (Promusicae)	55

=== Year-end charts ===
1987 year-end chart performance for Substance 1987
Chart (1987)	Position
Australian Albums (Kent Music Report)	57
Canada Top Albums/CDs (RPM)	59
UK Albums (Gallup)	62

1988 year-end chart performance for Substance 1987
Chart (1988)	Position
Canada Top Albums/CDs (RPM)	95
US Billboard 200	81

== Certifications ==
Certifications for Substance 1987
Region	Certification	Certified units/sales
Brazil (Pro-Música Brasil)	Gold	100,000^{*}
Canada (Music Canada)	Platinum	100,000^{^}
United Kingdom (BPI)	Platinum	300,000^{^}
United States (RIAA)	Platinum	1,000,000^{^}
^{*} Sales figures based on certification alone.^{^} Shipments figures based on certification alone.
