= Power, Corruption & Lies =

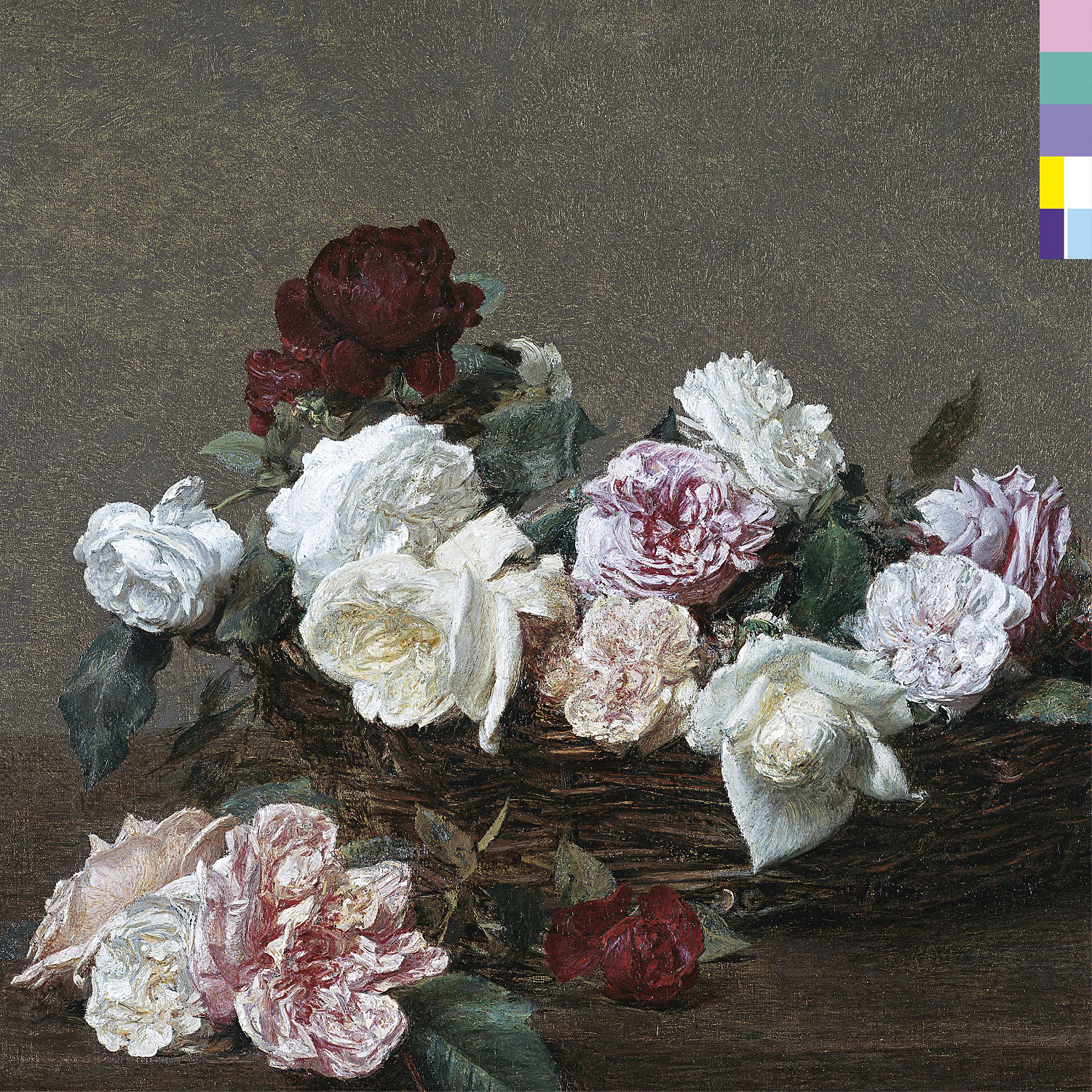

Studio album by New Order
- Released: 2 May 1983
- Studio: Britannia Row (Islington)
- Genres: Synth-pop; post-punk
- Length: 42:34
- Label: Factory
- Producer: New Order

New Order chronology
1981–1982 (1982)	Power, Corruption & Lies (1983)	Low-Life (1985)

Power, Corruption & Lies is the second studio album by the English rock band New Order, released on 2 May 1983 by Factory Records. The album features more electronic tracks than their debut studio album Movement (1981), with heavier use of synthesisers. The album was met with widespread acclaim, and has been included in music industry lists of the greatest albums of the 1980s and of all time. The cover artwork was by Peter Saville, and in 2010 it was one of ten classic album covers from British artists commemorated on a UK postage stamp issued by the Royal Mail.

== Music ==
Power, Corruption & Lies, an evolution from New Order's debut album, Movement (1981), combines the band's roots in post-punk with influences from electronic music into a sound described as synth-pop, electropop, new wave, synth-rock, dance-rock, post-punk and dance-punk. According to Matt Mitchell of Paste Magazine, "[the album] was, at the time, the heaviest the band had ever flirted with electronica." Mitchell further characterized the album's sound as "a gentle portrait of ambient, post-industrial tenderness." The track "5-8-6" has been called "a literal interpretation of early house music", while influences from Kraftwerk and Giorgio Moroder has also been noted. Additionally, the album's sounds have been categorised as synth-pop, and darker songs such as "We All Stand" and “Your Silent Face” are contrasted with brighter and more optimistic songs such as "The Village”. GQ India assessed: "By doing what Joy Division had not been able to do – playing in America, visiting New York clubs, getting a serious hit with 'Blue Monday' – the light began to seep in through the once cavernous darkness of the New Order sound. The sheer force of Power, Corruption and Lies comes from the intensity of this newfound light and euphoria charging through their music." The hit single "Blue Monday" was recorded in the same sessions and released separately as a non-album twelve-inch single, later appearing as an added track on some CD versions of the album.

== Artwork ==
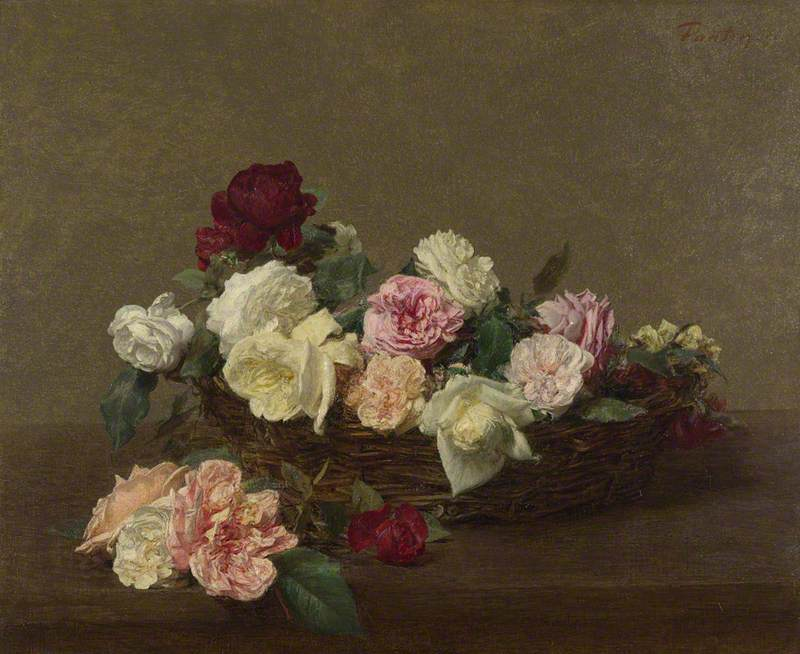
The painting A Basket of Roses by French artist Henri Fantin-Latour was reproduced for the album's cover art.

Peter Saville's design for the album had a colour-based code to represent the band's name and the title of the album, but they were not written on the original UK sleeve (they were present on some non-UK versions), although the catalogue number "FACT 75" does appear on the top-right corner. The decoder for the code was featured prominently on the back cover of the album and can also be seen on the "Blue Monday" and "Confusion" singles and for Section 25's third studio album From the Hip (1984).

The cover is a reproduction of the painting A Basket of Roses by French artist Henri Fantin-Latour, which is part of the National Gallery's permanent collection in London. Saville had originally planned to use a Renaissance portrait of a dark prince to tie in with the Machiavellian theme of the title, but could not find a suitable portrait. At the gallery Saville picked up a postcard with Fantin-Latour's painting, and his girlfriend mockingly asked him if he was going to use it for the cover. Saville then realised it was a great idea. Saville commented that the flowers "suggested the means by which power, corruption and lies infiltrate our lives. They're seductive." In 2014, the cover was itself added to the permanent collection of the Museum of Modern Art in New York.

The Fantin-Latour still-life depicted on the cover, an overtly romantic image, is in stark contrast with the typography based on the modular, colour-coded alphabet. Saville and Tony Wilson, the head of New Order's label Factory Records, also said that the owner of the painting (The National Heritage Trust) first refused the label access to it. Wilson then called up the gallery director to ask who actually owned the painting and was given the answer that the Trust belonged to the people of Britain, at some point. Wilson then replied, "I believe the people want it." The director then replied, "If you put it like that, Mr Wilson, I'm sure we can make an exception in this case."

The cover was among the ten chosen by the Royal Mail for a set of "Classic Album Cover" postage stamps issued in January 2010. Fashion designer Raf Simons used the album's cover art on one of his most coveted pieces from the Autumn/Winter 2003 "Closer" collection, ultimately producing four fishtail parkas in varying colours with various pieces of New Order/Joy Division artwork spread around the pieces. The street-fashion label Supreme included the album's floral motif as part of their Spring–Summer 2013 collection.

== Critical reception ==
Professional ratings
Review scores
Source	Rating
AllMusic	4.5/5 stars
The A.V. Club	A
Blender	4/5 stars
Entertainment Weekly	A
Pitchfork	9.6/10
Q	4/5 stars
Rolling Stone	4/5 stars
The Rolling Stone Album Guide	4.5/5 stars
Uncut	9/10
The Village Voice	B+

Power, Corruption & Lies was praised critically on its release, and is still well regarded. In a contemporary review for Rolling Stone magazine, Steve Pond felt that the band had finally separated themselves from their past Joy Division associations, calling the album a "remarkable declaration of independence" and a "quantum leap" over Movement. Robert Christgau of The Village Voice found it "relatively gentle and melodic in its ambient postindustrial polyrhythms, their nicest record ever", but also "pretty much like the others." The album placed at number 23 in The Village Voice's 1983 Pazz & Jop critics' poll. In a retrospective review, Josh Modell of The A.V. Club called Power, Corruption & Lies "the sound of a band coming out of the shadows, retaining some of the pop elements of older days, but also embracing happiness and a whole new world of sequencers," crediting the album's humanity as a part of its charm. John Bush of AllMusic stated that the album "cemented New Order's place as the most exciting dance-rock hybrid in music."

In 1989, Power, Corruption & Lies was ranked number 94 on Rolling Stone's list of the 100 greatest albums of the 1980s, with the magazine citing it as "a landmark album of danceable, post-punk music". Rolling Stone also placed the album at number 262 on the 2020 edition of its list of the 500 greatest albums of all time (it was not included on the original 2003 and 2012 lists). It was placed at number 28 on Pitchfork's list of the best albums of the 1980s, with William Bowers' accompanying write-up for the album citing it as "the peak of the New Order's stellar 80s output." Slant Magazine listed the album at number 23 on its list of the best albums of the 1980s and stated that it "marks the real beginning of New Order's career" and was "their first perfect pop record". In 2013, it was ranked at number 216 on NME's list of the 500 greatest albums of all time.

In 2016, Paste Magazine named the album as the eighth-best post-punk release of all time. Staff writer Ross Bonaime said: "Power, Corruption and Lies is filled with themes of loneliness, anger and loves lost; it’s easy to see how New Order has influenced everyone from The Smiths to M83. Curtis would have been proud."

GQ India wrote that the album "was a crucial release of British synth-pop, where acts like Pet Shop Boys and Depeche Mode showed that electronic innovation could walk hand in hand with songwriting every bit as sharp as anything from the 1960s, as well as taking its place at the cutting edge of style."

== Track listing ==
All tracks are written by Bernard Sumner, Peter Hook, Stephen Morris, Gillian Gilbert, except where indicated.

Side one
No.	Title	Length
1.	"Age of Consent"	5:15
2.	"We All Stand"	5:14
3.	"The Village"	4:37
4.	"5 8 6"	7:31

Side two
No.	Title	Length
1.	"Your Silent Face"	5:59
2.	"Ultraviolence"	4:52
3.	"Ecstasy"	4:25
4.	"Leave Me Alone"	4:41
Total length:		42:34

Qwest Records additional tracks
No.	Title	Length
5.	"Blue Monday"	7:29
10.	"The Beach"	7:18
Total length:		57:21

- "Blue Monday" only appears on certain cassette and CD versions of Power, Corruption & Lies.

2008 collector's edition bonus disc
No.	Title	Writer(s)	Length
1.	"Blue Monday"		7:32
2.	"The Beach"		7:22
3.	"Confusion"	Arthur Baker, Bernard Sumner, Peter Hook, Stephen Morris, Gillian Gilbert	8:15
4.	"Thieves Like Us"	Baker, Sumner, Hook, Morris, Gilbert	6:38
5.	"Lonesome Tonight"		5:13
6.	"Murder"		3:57
7.	"Thieves Like Us" (Instrumental)	Baker, Sumner, Hook, Morris, Gilbert	6:59
8.	"Confusion" (Instrumental)	Baker, Sumner, Hook, Morris, Gilbert	7:36
Total length:			53:32

=== 2020 Definitive Edition ===
Released on 2 October 2020, the second New Order album was a part of the Definitive series. The expanded box set featured both a newly remastered LP and CD of the original album, an additional CD of demos and unreleased recordings, two DVDs of live performances and television broadcasts, and a hardcover book detailing the history of the album.

Alongside the box set, the singles "Blue Monday", "Confusion", "Thieves Like Us" and "Murder" were reissued in a 12" format.

On 5 December 2025, Power, Corruption & Lies was reissued on CD, featuring both the original album and the bonus disc found in the Definitive set, marking the first time any additional material from the Definitive series was available to purchase outside of the box set.

2020 Definitive Edition bonus disc
No.	Title	Writer(s)	Length
1.	"Age of Consent" (Writing Session Recording)		4:40
2.	"The Village" (Writing Session Recording)		3:14
3.	"5 8 6" (Writing Session Recording)		3:24
4.	"Your Silent Face" (Writing Session Recording)		5:01
5.	"Ecstasy" (Writing Session Recording)		4:24
6.	"Leave Me Alone" (Writing Session Recording)		4:09
7.	"Turn The Heater On" (Peel Session)	Keith Hudson	5:02
8.	"We All Stand" (Peel Session)		5:24
9.	"Too Late" (Peel Session)		3:37
10.	"5 8 6" (Peel Session)		6:08
11.	"Too Late" (Instrumental Rough Mix; Peel Session Outtake, June 1982)		3:41
12.	"Thieves like Us" (New York Demo #1, 1983)	Arthur Baker, Sumner, Hook, Morris, Gilbert	6:41
13.	"Thieves like Us" (1983 Writing Session Recording)	Baker, Sumner, Hook, Morris, Gilbert	1:59
14.	"Murder" (Writing Session Recording)		3:40
15.	"Blue Monday" (Writing Session Recording)		2:09
16.	"Blue Monday" (1982 Writing Session Recording)		5:50
17.	"Blue Monday" (Instrumental Outtake; Album Session Recording, January 1983)		7:19
Total length:			76:22

Digital exclusive bonus track
No.	Title	Length
18.	"Video 5 8 6"	22:08
Total length:		98:30

2020 Definitive Edition bonus DVD 1

Live at The Haçienda, Manchester, 1982
No.	Title	Writer(s)	Length
1.	"In a Lonely Place"	Ian Curtis, Sumner, Hook, Morris	4:59
2.	"Ultraviolence"		3:37
3.	"Denial"		4:07
4.	"The Village"		4:19
5.	"We All Stand"		5:32
6.	"Senses"		4:07
7.	"Chosen Time"		3:20
8.	"5 8 6"		4:52
9.	"Temptation"		7:35
10.	"Everything's Gone Green"		5:21

Live at Rosehill Hotel, Kilkenny, Ireland 1983
No.	Title	Writer(s)	Length
1.	"We All Stand"		5:18
2.	"Leave Me Alone"		4:07
3.	"Denial"		4:49
4.	"The Village"		5:10
5.	"Temptation"		9:20
6.	"Confusion"	Baker, Sumner, Hook, Morris, Gilbert	6:11
7.	"Age of Consent"		6:25
8.	"Blue Monday"		4:26
9.	"Everything's Gone Green"		7:13
10.	"Ceremony"	Curtis, Sumner, Hook, Morris	5:02

TV Sessions
No.	Title	Writer(s)	Length
1.	"Blue Monday" (BBC Top of the Pops, London, 1983)		3:57
2.	"Confusion" (Countdown, 1983)	Baker, Sumner, Hook, Morris, Gilbert	5:01
3.	"Age of Consent" (Switch, 1983)		4:35
4.	"Blue Monday" (Switch, 1983)		5:23
5.	"Thieves Like Us" (BBC Top of the Pops, London, 1984)		3:25

Extras
No.	Title	Writer(s)	Length
1.	"Your Silent Face" (Live at The Haçienda, Manchester, 1983)		6:47
2.	"5 8 6" (Live at The Haçienda, Manchester, 1983)		6:25
3.	"We All Stand" (Live at Recreation Centre, Tolworth, 1983)		6:50
4.	"Leave Me Alone" (Live at Recreation Centre, Tolworth, 1983)		4:11
5.	"Love Will Tear Us Apart" (Live at Tower Ballroom, Birmingham, 1983)	Curtis, Sumner, Hook, Morris	3:39
6.	"Ultraviolence" (Live at First Avenue, Minneapolis, 1983)		5:38
7.	"The Village" (Live at Uni-Mensa, Dusseldorf, 1984)		5:01
8.	"Thieves Like Us" (Live at Alabama-Halle, Munich, 1984)	Baker, Sumner, Hook, Morris, Gilbert	6:37
9.	"Blue Monday" (Live at Alabama-Halle, Munich, 1984)		7:43
10.	"Lonesome Tonight" (Live at Metropol, Berlin, 1984)		5:30
11.	"Confusion" (Live at Metropol, Berlin, 1984)	Baker, Sumner, Hook, Morris, Gilbert	6:55
Total length:			193:27

2020 Definitive Edition bonus DVD 2

Live at The Haçienda, Manchester, 1983
No.	Title	Writer(s)	Length
1.	"Blue Monday"		8:40
2.	"Age of Consent"		5:03
3.	"Lonesome Tonight"		5:47
4.	"Your Silent Face"		8:06
5.	"Leave Me Alone"		4:42
6.	"5 8 6"		7:11
7.	"Denial"		5:28
8.	"Confusion"	Baker, Sumner, Hook, Morris, Gilbert	6:03
9.	"Temptation"		8:17
10.	"Thieves Like Us"	Baker, Sumner, Hook, Morris, Gilbert	14:49
11.	"In a Lonely Place"	Curtis, Sumner, Hook, Morris	5:20
12.	"Everything's Gone Green"		6:02
Total length:			85:28

== Personnel ==
New Order

- Bernard Sumner – vocals, guitars, melodica, synthesisers and programming
- Peter Hook – 4- and 6-stringed bass and electronic percussion
- Stephen Morris – drums, synthesisers and programming
- Gillian Gilbert – synthesisers, guitars and programming

Technical

- New Order – production
- Michael Johnson – engineering
- Barry Sage and Mark Boyne – assistants

== Release details ==
- UK LP – Factory Records (FACT 75)
- UK CD – Factory Records (FACD 75)
- UK cassette – Factory Records (FACT 75C)
- US LP – Factory Records/Rough Trade Records (FACTUS 12)
- US CD – Factory Records/Qwest Records (9 25308-2)
- UK CD (1993 re-release) – London Records (520,019-2)
- GR LP – Factory Records (VG50085)

After the release of Music Complete, the album was remastered and re-released for the US iTunes Store.

== Charts ==
=== Weekly charts ===
1983 chart performance for Power, Corruption & Lies
Chart (1983)	Peak position
Australian Albums (Kent Music Report)	38
Canada Top Albums/CDs (RPM)	66
Dutch Albums (Album Top 100)	14
German Albums (Offizielle Top 100)	18
New Zealand Albums (RMNZ)	3
Swedish Albums (Sverigetopplistan)	16
UK Albums (Official Charts)	4
UK Independent Albums (MRIB)	1

2020 chart performance for Power, Corruption & Lies
Chart (2020)	Peak position
Belgian Albums (Ultratop Wallonia)	136
Hungarian Albums (MAHASZ)	27

=== Year-end charts ===
Year-end chart performance for Power, Corruption & Lies
Chart (1983)	Position
New Zealand Albums (RMNZ)	33

== Certifications ==
Certifications for Power, Corruption & Lies
Region	Certification	Certified units/sales
United Kingdom (BPI)	Gold	100,000^{‡}
^{‡} Sales+streaming figures based on certification alone.

== See also ==
- List of 1980s albums considered the best
- List of songs recorded by New Order
- New Order discography
