= New Order Story =

1993 documentary film

New Order Story is a 1993 documentary about the English band New Order, featuring the majority of their music videos, as well as interviews with the band members, their manager Rob Gretton, producers, etc. It also features appearances from Pet Shop Boys' Neil Tennant, U2's Bono, Quincy Jones and Jon Savage. Written by Paul Morley, and directed by Kevin Hewitt, the film offers sometimes an eccentric setting (Sumner was interviewed while having his haircut done, Bono took the charge himself using his camcorder, the entire band and their friends also can be seen as guests of a fictional TV game show hosted by Keith Allen). Though it's not visible in the documentary, the band was filmed at the brink of their separation that would last for five years.

The documentary starts off with the Joy Division days through its vocalist Ian Curtis's suicide to the formation of New Order. An edited version of the documentary was first broadcast on the ITV network on the night of 29 August 1993, coinciding with New Order's headline performance at the Reading Festival. It was then released on VHS in October 1993, edited into a full (British) version and a shorter American version. In 2005, the film was released both in the UK and the US on DVD in its full version. It was also available as part of Item, a limited edition boxset available in the US (and in the UK only via HMV stores) that collected New Order Story and A Collection.

== Track listing ==
1. "Transmission" (Live September 1979) (Note: These tracks were performed by Joy Division.)
2. "Love Will Tear Us Apart" (Video 1980)
3. "Ceremony" (Live June 1981)
4. "Temptation" (Live April 1982)
5. "Blue Monday" (Live March 1983)
6. "Confusion" (Video 1983)
7. "The Perfect Kiss" (Video)
8. "Shellshock" (Video)
9. "Bizarre Love Triangle" (Video)
10. "True Faith" (Video)
11. "Touched by the Hand of God" (Video)
12. "Blue Monday '88" (Video)
13. "Fine Time" (Video)
14. "Round & Round" (Video)
15. "World in Motion" (Video)
16. "Regret" (Live April 1993)
17. "Everyone Everywhere" (Live July 1993)
18. "Temptation" (Live July 1993)
19. "Ruined in a Day" (Video 1993)
20. "World (The Price of Love)" (Video 1993)
21. "Atmosphere" (Video 1988)
