= Shellshock (song) =

Single by New Order

from the album Pretty in Pink (soundtrack)
- Released: 17 March 1986
- Recorded: 1985
- Length: 6:04 (Pretty in Pink original version); 4:24 (7-inch single edit); 9:41 (12-inch single remix); 6:28 (Substance 1987 edit of 12-inch remix)
- Label: Factory - FAC 143; A&M
- Songwriters: Gillian Gilbert; Peter Hook; Stephen Morris; John Robie; Bernard Sumner
- Producers: New Order; John Robie

New Order singles chronology
"Sub-culture" (1985)	"Shellshock" (1986)	"State of the Nation" (1986)

"Shellshock" is the eleventh single released by the English rock band New Order on 17 March 1986. The song originally appeared on the soundtrack to the movie Pretty in Pink one month prior to its single release. Production is credited to New Order and John Robie, and is loosely inspired by the 1983 Robie-produced R&B club hit, "One More Shot"—a studio project where Robie performed under the band name, C-Bank, and featuring vocals by Jenny Burton.

The single had differing B-sides; in the UK (catalogue number: FAC 143) the 7-inch came with the recycled "Thieves Like Us" instrumental, which also turned up in the movie Pretty in Pink (although not on the soundtrack), while the 12-inch had a dub mix titled "Shellcock". The US release had the also previously released instrumental version of "Thieves Like Us", which had appeared on the "Murder" 12-inch single on Factory Benelux.

"Shellshock" was an international hit, making the mainstream chart in the UK, Ireland, Australia and New Zealand.

The 12-inch boasts an extended remix of the song running nearly ten minutes, New Order's longest single not based on a track from one of their studio albums (discounting remixes of legacy songs) behind the 22.5-minute uncut release of "Video 5 8 6". For the release of the popular singles compilation Substance, the original Pretty in Pink soundtrack version was not used, as is widely believed, but an edited version of the 12-inch remix cut down to six-and-a-half minutes, omitting an entire verse of vocals. It is this version that appears most often on CD. The 9:41 single remix does not appear on any subsequent New Order compilations, however it surfaced on CD and digital download in 2011 on Volume 6 of the Blank & Jones Soeighties compilation series, titled "Extended Version".

In 2022 the full original 12" version, with a track length of 9:46, was finally released widely in digital format to streaming platforms as a single with the title "Shellshock (2022 Digital Master)".

== Artwork ==
The cover artwork on the 12-inch single is by English photographer Geoff Power, taken in Florence, Italy.

== Track listing ==
All tracks are written by Gillian Gilbert, Peter Hook, Stephen Morris, John Robie, Bernard Sumner; except where indicated.

7-inch: FAC 143 (UK)
No.	Title	Writer(s)	Length
1.	"Shellshock"		4:19
2.	"Thieves Like Us" (instrumental edit)	Arthur Baker, Gilbert, Hook, Morris, Sumner	3:55

12-inch: FAC 143 (UK)
No.	Title	Length
1.	"Shellshock"	9:41
2.	"Shellcock"	7:35

12-inch: A&M SP-12174 (US)
No.	Title	Writer(s)	Length
1.	"Shellshock"		9:41
2.	"Thieves Like Us" (instrumental version)	Baker, Gilbert, Hook, Morris, Sumner	6:39

== Chart positions ==
Chart (1986)	Peak position
Australia (Kent Music Report)	23
Ireland (IRMA)	18
New Zealand RIANZ Singles Chart	8
UK Singles Chart	28
UK Indie Singles	1
US Billboard Hot Dance Club Play	14
US Billboard Hot Dance Singles Sales	26
