= Planet Patrol (band) =

American electro group

- Origin: Boston, Massachusetts, U.S.
- Genres: Electro funk, freestyle, old school hip hop
- Years active: 1982–1984; 2006–present
- Label: Tommy Boy/Warner Bros. Records

Planet Patrol is an American electro group originating in the 1980s. The members were Arthur Baker, John Robie, and a quintet of vocalists led by Herbert J. Jackson (lead singer), Joseph Lites, Rodney Butler, Michael Anthony Jones, and Melvin B. Franklin (not to be confused with Melvin Franklin of The Temptations). The group only produced a single album, the self-titled Planet Patrol in 1983, which peaked at #64 on the Billboard R&B Albums chart.

The group's most popular song, "Play at Your Own Risk", was created from tracks that did not make the final version of Afrika Bambaataa's seminal "Planet Rock".

== Discography ==
=== Albums ===
Year	Album	Label	US R&B
1983	Planet Patrol	Tommy Boy/Warner Bros. Records	64

=== Singles ===
Year	Single	Peak chart positions		
Year	Single	US Dance	US R&B	UK
1982	"Play at Your Own Risk"	10	21	―
1983	"I Didn't Know I Loved You (Till I Saw You Rock and Roll)"	―	62	―
1983	"Cheap Thrills"	56	30	64
1984	"It Wouldn't Have Made Any Difference"	―	―	―
1984	"Danger Zone"	―	―	―
"—" denotes releases that did not chart or were not released in that territory.
