= Murder (song) =

Single by New Order
- B-side: "Thieves Like Us" (instrumental)
- Released: May 1984
- Recorded: Winter 1982
- Genre: Post-punk
- Length: 3:55
- Label: Factory Benelux - FBN 22
- Songwriters: Gillian Gilbert, Peter Hook, Stephen Morris, Bernard Sumner
- Producer: New Order

New Order singles chronology
"Thieves Like Us" (1984)	"Murder" (1984)	"The Perfect Kiss" (1985)

"Murder" is the eighth single by English rock band New Order. Released on the Belgian Factory Benelux label in 1984, it is an instrumental piece that contains samples of dialogue from the films 2001: A Space Odyssey and Caligula. It was recorded in winter 1982 during the sessions for the band's second album Power, Corruption & Lies.

The B-side is an instrumental version of the previous single by the group, "Thieves Like Us".

"Murder" was only released in Belgium as a single, but was available in the UK on import and made number 92. As such, it is the band's only release to miss the UK Top 75.

== Sleeve ==
The single's cover design by Peter Saville was based on a 'metaphysical' painting by Giorgio de Chirico. It forms a set with the cover art for "Thieves Like Us", taking place inside the previous singles building during night-time.

== Covers ==
The Charlatans covered the song as an exclusive download for their 2008 single "Oh! Vanity". The Charlatans' lead singer Tim Burgess is a notable fan of the band and has cited Power, Corruption & Lies as his favourite album.

It was also covered by K-X-P, whose cover was included on the Power, Corruption & Lies Covered CD (free with the February 2012 issue of Mojo magazine).

== Releases ==
As well as the original single, both tracks are available on the CD version of 1987's compilation, Substance, although neither track appears on the LP issue. "Murder" does not appear on Disc 1 of Substance, which otherwise contains versions of every New Order single A-side up to 1987. It instead appears on disc 2, which otherwise contains versions of every New Order B-side through 1987 (including "Thieves Like Us (Instrumental)"). The double cassette version of "Substance" (FACT200c) has "Murder" correctly located between "Thieves Like Us" and "The Perfect Kiss" on the A-sides cassette, but omits it from the track listing, instead incorrectly listing it as being on the B-sides cassette.

== Track listing ==
12: FBN 22 (Benelux)
No.	Title	Writer(s)	Length
1.	"Murder"	Gillian Gilbert, Peter Hook, Stephen Morris, Bernard Sumner	3:55
2.	"Thieves Like Us Instrumental"	Arthur Baker, Gilbert, Hook, Morris, Sumner	6:57

== Chart positions ==
Chart (1984)	Peak position
UK Singles Chart	92
UK Independent Singles Chart	2
