= Sub-culture (song) =

Single by New Order

from the album Low-Life
- B-side: "Dub-vulture"
- Released: 28 October 1985
- Genre: Hi-NRG; techno-pop
- Length: 4:58 (Album version); 7:26 (12" remix); 3:28 (7-inch version); 4:48 (Substance 1987 version)
- Label: Factory - FAC 133
- Songwriters: Gillian Gilbert; Peter Hook; Stephen Morris; Bernard Sumner
- Producer: New Order

New Order singles chronology
"The Perfect Kiss" (1985)	"Sub-culture" (1985)	"Shellshock" (1986)

"Sub-culture" is the tenth single by English rock band New Order. It was released as the second and final single from their third studio album, Low-Life (1985) on 28 October 1985 by Factory Records.

== Release ==
The single release, remixed by John Robie, is a drastic departure from the album version of the track. Robie's 12" and 7" single mixes feature more club-oriented, electronic instrumentation and prominent soulful female backing vocals.

The B-side is an instrumental remix titled "Dub-vulture". An alternate seven-inch edit of the Robie remix taken from the Benelux version of the "Sub-culture" single appears on the group's 1987 compilation, Substance. This version also appears on the US 12" alongside the longer mixes.

A collection of Razormaid remixes of the track were released in 1986, which include additional vocals by Deborah Iyall of Romeo Void.

== Artwork ==
"Sub-culture" has only a regular black sleeve. A long-standing rumour held that graphic designer Peter Saville reportedly deemed the mix of the song unworthy of his talents, with Saville's input present only in a P/S/A (Peter Saville Associates) credit for typography. However this rumour was debunked in 2017 when Saville stated, "I never had the authority to say that there shouldn't be a sleeve. No, all I can presume is that one was not asked for."

== Track listing ==
All tracks are written by Gillian Gilbert, Peter Hook, Stephen Morris and Bernard Sumner.

7": 7FAC 133 (UK)
No.	Title	Length
1.	"Sub-culture"	3:28
2.	"Dub-vulture"	3:38

7": 7FAC 133 (Benelux)
No.	Title	Length
1.	"Sub-culture" (Remix Edit)	4:57
2.	"Sub-culture" (Original Album Version)	4:58

12": FAC 133 (UK)
No.	Title	Length
1.	"Sub-culture"	7:26
2.	"Dub-vulture"	7:57

12": Qwest 0-20390 (US)
No.	Title	Length
1.	"Sub-culture" (Remix)	7:26
2.	"Subvulture"	7:57
3.	"Sub-culture" (Remix Edit)	4:57

=== UK 7" free with Record Mirror - RM2 ===
1. New Order: "Sub-culture" (exclusive remix) – 4:14
2. Raymonde: "Jennifer Wants" (exclusive track) – 2:02
3. Hipsway: "Bad Thing Longing" (preview from their forthcoming album) – 4:09
4. Adventures: "Walk Away Renee" (specially recorded for RM) – 3:11

== Chart positions ==
Chart (1985)	Peak position
New Zealand RIANZ Singles Chart	29
UK Singles Chart	63
UK Independent Singles Chart	1
US Billboard Hot Dance Club Play	35
US Billboard Hot Dance Singles Sales	18
