= Video 5 8 6 =

Single by New Order
- B-side: "As You Said"
- Released: 22 September 1997
- Recorded: 1982
- Genre: Electronic; experimental
- Length: 22:23
- Label: Touch
- Producer: New Order

New Order singles chronology
"Blue Monday-95" (1995)	"Video 5 8 6" (1997)	"Crystal" (2001)

Professional ratings
Review scores
Source	Rating
AllMusic	4/5 stars

"Video 5 8 6", originally titled "Prime 5 8 6", is an electronic instrumental piece written and produced by the British group New Order. The track was initially released in two sections in Touch Music's first cassette magazine, Feature Mist, in December 1982. Touch re-released the entire track as a CD single in 1997, making it New Order's twenty-fourth single.

Composed primarily by Bernard Sumner and Stephen Morris, "Prime 5 8 6"/"Video 5 8 6" was an early version of "5 8 6" (from Power, Corruption & Lies), which contained rhythm elements that would later surface on "Ultraviolence" and the 1983 hit "Blue Monday". After Factory Records' Tony Wilson asked New Order for twenty minutes of "pap", it was first played in public during the opening of The Haçienda on 21 May 1982.

On release in 1997 it reached #86 on the main British singles chart and #19 on the British indie chart. Bassist Peter Hook has said the key to the title "5 8 6" can be found in another of the group's songs, "Ecstasy"; 5, 8 then 6 is the song's bar structure.

A video was released for the song, "Primitive 586", on the FACT 56, IKON 3 VHS and BETA tape A Factory Video, the footage is mostly primitive 80s computer graphics.

== Legacy ==
Dave Simpson of The Guardian, including "Video 5 8 6" in a list of ten of New Order's best tracks, called it a "motorik electronic odyssey" and added: "Eventually released as a CD single in 1997, this combination of endlessly repetitive groove and electro bassline is as hypnotic as anything they recorded."

== Track listing ==
CD: TONE 7 (UK)
No.	Title	Length
1.	"Video 5-8-6" (Performed by New Order)	22:25
2.	"As You Said" (Performed by Joy Division - only included on 12" versions TONE 7.1)	2:01

== Chart positions ==
Chart (1997)	Peak position
UK Singles Chart	86
UK Indie Singles	19
