= Love Vigilantes =

Song by New Order

from the album Low-Life
- Released: 13 May 1985
- Recorded: 1984
- Studio: Jam and Britannia Row, London
- Genre: Indie pop; techno-country; college rock
- Length: 4:16
- Label: Factory
- Songwriters: Peter Hook; Gillian Gilbert; Stephen Morris; Bernard Sumner
- Producer: New Order

"Love Vigilantes" is a song by English rock band New Order. It first appeared as the opening track of their third studio album, Low-Life (1985). The song is a departure from New Order's usual style in many ways. Described by AllMusic as "at its core a campfire singalong", "Love Vigilantes" is decidedly pop and shows inspiration from American country and folk music. In a 2014 list compiled by The Guardian, "Love Vigilantes" was ranked ninth in a list of the ten best New Order songs.

== Lyrics ==
According to Bernard Sumner, "Love Vigilantes" is one of the few songs for which he started out wanting to tell a story, as opposed to his usual method, where he would first listen to a newly composed piece before writing lyrics to match the mood of the music. Having "decided to write a redneck song", Sumner's lyrics tell a rather "tongue-in-cheek" tale of a soldier returning home from Vietnam, only to find that his wife had received a telegram informing her that he had died. Sumner further relates that the ending is open to interpretation; either the soldier had actually died and returns as a ghost, or the telegram was sent mistakenly and he is quite alive. Either way, he finds her lying on the floor, having committed suicide with the telegram in her hand, an ending Sumner describes as "a very country tragedy".

The subject matter of "Love Vigilantes" has been compared to that of the 1969 reggae hit "Vietnam" by Jimmy Cliff. New Order would later cover the song in 2003 for War Child's Hope compilation album.

== Composition ==
The music of "Love Vigilantes" forgoes most of the electronics that otherwise define New Order's typical sound. After an opening of four hits on a snare drum, the music is built around multiple hooks, starting with the intro theme, which Spin magazine called "Beatlesque", played by Sumner on a melodica followed by his acoustic guitar riff which repeats throughout the song. Combined with a synthesized low end and Peter Hook's higher "twangy" bass, this new sound for New Order was "gorgeously lush" and "unlike anything that New Order has attempted before".

== Covers ==
- Oyster Band (1989)
- Poi Dog Pondering (1990)
- Love Seed Mama Jump (1994)
- Pato Fu (1998)
- Hideki Yoshimura (2001)
- Hungry Lucy (2001)
- Uns e Outros (2002)
- Vitamin String Quartet (2003)
- Digital (2004) ...Digital
- Sheriff Scabs (2005)
- Laura Cantrell and Ted Leo (2007)
- Dust Rhinos (2007)
- Laura Cantrell (2008)
- Iron & Wine (2009)
- Comet Gain (2010)
- Jimmy Oakes (2010)
- Duncan Sheik (2011)
- Little Brother & Sisters (2014)
- Depth & Current (2015)
- Tom Phillips (2015)
- Jackie Oates & Megan Henwood (2016)
- Eve St. Jones (2016)
- Superchunk (2017)
- Adam Zahl (2018)
- 8 Bit Arcade (2019)
- The Stencil Factory (2021)
- Voxtrot (2022)
- The Grindstone (2024)
