= Bizarre Love Triangle =

1986 song by New Order

Single by New Order

from the album Brotherhood
- Released: 3 November 1986
- Genre: Synth-pop; alternative dance; new wave; disco
- Length: 4:21 (album version); 3:43 (7-inch version); 6:43 (extended mix)
- Label: Factory
- Songwriters: Gillian Gilbert; Peter Hook; Stephen Morris; Bernard Sumner
- Producer: New Order

New Order singles chronology
"State of the Nation" (1986)	"Bizarre Love Triangle" (1986)	"True Faith" (1987)

Music video
- "Bizarre Love Triangle” on YouTube

"Bizarre Love Triangle" is a song by English rock band New Order, released as a single in November 1986 from their fourth studio album, Brotherhood (1986). The song reached No. 4 on the US Billboard Dance/Disco Club Play chart and No. 5 on the Australian Kent Music Report in March 1987. It failed to enter the top 40 of both the UK Singles Chart and the US Billboard Hot 100; however, a new mix included on The Best of New Order was released in 1994 and charted at No. 98 on the Hot 100. In 2003, the song was ranked No. 204 on Rolling Stone's "The 500 Greatest Songs of All Time."

== Releases ==
The 12-inch version, remixed by Shep Pettibone, also appears on the compilation Substance and a second remix by Stephen Hague features on their Best Of album. The original album version appears on the 2005 compilation Singles, the 7-inch version appears on the 2016 reissue of this compilation. New Order's live versions since 1998 are based on the Shep Pettibone remix.

The single mix has more electronics than the album version, with the Fairlight CMI music workstation used to provide sounds such as the orchestral hits, and to sequence the song. All instruments except vocals and Peter Hook's melodic bass were sequenced (the song also prominently features synthesised bass and synth choir parts).

== Reception ==
"Bizarre Love Triangle" has been critically acclaimed since its release. In a 30th anniversary retrospective citing the song as one of the greatest of all time, Billboard described it as a "synth-pop masterpiece" and "an incandescent jewel of mid-'80s computer love." NME praised the song as New Order's "finest pop moment" and credited its simplicity in comparison to previous singles such as "Blue Monday". In 2004, the song was ranked No. 204 in Rolling Stone's list of "The 500 Greatest Songs of All Time." In 2013, Stereogum ranked the song No. 2 on their list of the 10 greatest New Order songs, and in 2021, The Guardian ranked the song No. 7 on their list of the 30 greatest New Order songs.

== Music video ==
The music video, which was released in November 1986, was directed by American artists Robert Longo and Gretchen Bender. It mainly shows a man and a woman in business suits flying through the air as though propelled by trampolines; this is based directly on Longo's "Men in the Cities" series of lithographs. The video has a black and white cut-scene where Jodi Long and E. Max Frye are arguing about reincarnation, in which Long emphatically declares "I don't believe in reincarnation because I refuse to come back as a bug or as a rabbit!" Frye responds, "You know, you're a real 'up' person," before the song resumes.

== Track listings ==
All tracks are written by Gillian Gilbert, Peter Hook, Stephen Morris, Bernard Sumner.

7-inch: FAC 163 (UK)
No.	Title	Length
1.	"Bizarre Love Triangle" (Shep Pettibone Remix UK 7-inch edit)	3:43
2.	"Bizarre Dub Triangle"	3:23

7-inch: Qwest 7-28421 (US) and 7-inch: FAC-26 (Canada)
No.	Title	Length
1.	"Bizarre Love Triangle" (Shep Pettibone Remix US 7-inch edit)	3:36
2.	"Every Little Counts"	4:29

- Initial pressings (matrix FAC-26-A) were the UK 7-inch mix; later pressings (matrix FAC-26-A2) were the Canadian 7-inch mix

7-inch: FAC-163153 (Australia)
No.	Title	Length
1.	"Bizarre Love Triangle" (Shep Pettibone Remix US 7-inch edit)	3:36
2.	"State of the Nation"	3:27

12-inch: FAC 163 (UK)
No.	Title	Length
1.	"Bizarre Love Triangle" (Shep Pettibone extended remix)	6:44
2.	"Bizarre Dub Triangle"	7:02

12-inch: Qwest 0-20546 (US)
No.	Title	Length
1.	"Bizarre Love Triangle" (Shep Pettibone extended remix)	6:41
2.	"I Don't Care" (Actually "Bizarre Dub Triangle")	7:02
3.	"State of the Nation"	6:31
4.	"Bizarre Love Triangle" (Shep Pettibone Remix UK 7-inch edit)	3:43

- US editions mis-credit "Bizarre Dub Triangle" as "I Don't Care", reputedly due to a record company person contacting New Order's Manager Rob Gretton to ask what to name the mix as, Gretton is claimed to have said "I don't care"

CD: Qwest 9 20546-2 (US) – released in 1994
No.	Title	Length
1.	"Bizarre Love Triangle" (album version)	4:20
2.	"Bizarre Love Triangle" (extended dance mix)	6:44
3.	"I Don't Care" (actually "Bizarre Dub Triangle")	7:02
4.	"State of the Nation"	6:31
5.	"Bizarre Love Triangle" (single remix)	3:43

== Charts ==
=== Weekly charts ===
Chart (1986–1987)	Peak position
Australia (Kent Music Report)	5
Canada Top Singles (RPM)	51
Ireland (IRMA)	25
New Zealand (Recorded Music NZ)	19
UK Singles (Official Charts)	56
US Dance Club Songs (Billboard) remix—with "State of the Nation" (remix)	4
US Dance Singles Sales (Billboard) remix—with "State of the Nation" (remix)	8

Chart (1995)	Peak position
US Billboard Hot 100	98

=== Year-end charts ===
Chart (1987)	Position
Australia (Australian Music Report)	28

== Cover versions and remixes ==
- Australian band Frente! released an acoustic cover version of the song in 1994, re-imagining it as a folk ballad. Issued as part of the Lonely EP in their home country, the cover peaked at No. 7 on the ARIA Singles Chart and became a hit overseas, reaching No. 49 on the US Billboard Hot 100, No. 53 in Canada, and No. 76 in the United Kingdom. In Australia, it came in at No. 63 on the 1994 year-end chart and was certified gold for shipments of over 35,000.
