= State of the Nation (New Order song) =

Single by New Order

from the album Brotherhood (CD only)
- B-side: "Shame of the Nation"
- Released: 15 September 1986
- Recorded: 1986
- Length: 6:32 (12"), 3:27 (7")
- Label: Factory - FAC 153
- Songwriter(s): Gillian Gilbert, Peter Hook, Stephen Morris, Bernard Sumner
- Producer(s): New Order

New Order singles chronology
"Shellshock" (1986)	"State of the Nation" (1986)	"Bizarre Love Triangle" (1986)

"State of the Nation" is the twelfth single by English rock band New Order.

== Critical reception ==
Robin Smith of British music newspaper Record Mirror described it as a "colourless song, colourless tune, rather like the rest of their stuff."

== Track listing ==
All tracks are written by Gillian Gilbert, Peter Hook, Stephen Morris and Bernard Sumner; except where indicated.

7": FAC 153 (UK)
No.	Title	Writer(s)	Length
1.	"State of the Nation"		3:27
2.	"Shame of the Nation"	Gilbert, Hook, Morris, John Robie, Sumner	3:32

12": FAC 153 (UK)
No.	Title	Writer(s)	Length
1.	"State of the Nation"		6:32
2.	"Shame of the Nation"	Gilbert, Hook, Morris, Robie, Sumner	7:54

12": Qwest 0-20546 (US)
No.	Title	Length
1.	"Bizarre Love Triangle"	6:41
2.	"I Don't Care" (Actually "Bizarre Dub Triangle")	7:02
3.	"State of the Nation"	6:31
4.	"Bizarre Love Triangle"	3:43

== Chart positions ==
Chart (1986)	Peak position
New Zealand RIANZ Singles Chart	17
UK Singles Chart	30
UK Indie Singles	1
US Billboard Hot Dance Club Play ^{1}	4
US Billboard Hot Dance Singles Sales ^{1}	18

Notes:

- ^{1} - Charted together with "Bizarre Love Triangle".
