= Thieves Like Us (song) =

Single by New Order
- B-side: "Lonesome Tonight"
- Released: April 1984
- Recorded: January 1984
- Genre: Synth-pop; new wave
- Length: 6:36
- Label: Factory - FAC 103
- Songwriters: Arthur Baker; Gillian Gilbert; Peter Hook; Stephen Morris; Bernard Sumner
- Producer: New Order

New Order singles chronology
"Confusion" (1983)	"Thieves Like Us" (1984)	"Murder" (1984)

Audio
- "Thieves Like Us" on YouTube

"Thieves Like Us" is the seventh single by the English rock band New Order, released in April 1984 by Factory Records, catalogue number FAC 103. It is named after the 1974 film of the same name, directed by Robert Altman. Guitarist and lead singer Bernard Sumner stated during a TV interview in 1984 that the song's title was suggested by John Benitez (an associate of the song's co-writer, Arthur Baker).

The B-side is "Lonesome Tonight". Both tracks appear on the group's 1987 Substance compilation, and on the 2008 Collectors Edition of Power, Corruption & Lies, as well as the extended instrumental version of "Thieves Like Us" (originally the B-side to "Murder").

Like many of their releases, the record was produced by the band, although "Thieves Like Us" was co-written by Arthur Baker during the New York sessions for "Confusion".

The single's cover design by Peter Saville is based on a metaphysical painting by Giorgio de Chirico and the 19th century English board game The New and Fashionable Game of the Jew. It forms a set with their next single, "Murder".

An instrumental version of the song is featured in the 1986 movie Pretty in Pink.

== Reception ==
In a review for AllMusic, Ned Raggett wrote that the song introduced "a bit of sly, smooth seventies derived funk and soul to the New Order sound", praising its composition and production. He opined that Sumner's lyrics, which focus "on the power of love and connection", are "delivered with his slightly hangdog but yet strong style, a kind of blue-eyed soul for a later age."

In 2021, The Guardian ranked "Thieves Like Us" the third greatest New Order song, and the single's B-side, "Lonesome Tonight", the 17th.

== Track listing ==
All tracks are written by Arthur Baker, Gillian Gilbert, Peter Hook, Stephen Morris and Bernard Sumner; except where indicated.

12": FAC 103 (UK)
No.	Title	Writer(s)	Length
1.	"Thieves Like Us"		6:36
2.	"Lonesome Tonight"	Gilbert, Hook, Morris, Sumner	5:11

7": FAC 103 (UK Promo)
No.	Title	Writer(s)	Length
1.	"Thieves Like Us"		3:54
2.	"Lonesome Tonight"	Gilbert, Hook, Morris, Sumner	3:52

7": Tonpress S-534 (Poland)
No.	Title	Writer(s)	Length
1.	"Blue Monday"	Gilbert, Hook, Morris, Sumner	7:29
2.	"Thieves Like Us"		6:36

- Released in Poland under licence of Factory Records, 1985

== Chart positions ==
Chart (1984–1985)	Peak position
Australia (Kent Music Report)	84
Ireland (IRMA)	5
Netherlands (Dutch Top 40 Tipparade)	14
New Zealand (Recorded Music NZ)	14
UK Singles (OCC)	18
UK Indie	1
