= Confusion (New Order song) =

Single by New Order
- Released: August 1983
- Recorded: 1983
- Studio: Unique Recording Studios, New York City
- Genre: Alternative dance; electro
- Length: 8:12 (1983)
- Label: Factory – FAC 93; Streetwise
- Songwriters: Arthur Baker; Gillian Gilbert; Peter Hook; Stephen Morris; Bernard Sumner
- Producers: New Order; Arthur Baker; John Robie

New Order singles chronology
"Blue Monday" (1983)	"Confusion" (1983)	"Thieves Like Us" (1984)

"Confusion" is the sixth single by the English rock band New Order, originally released in August 1983 on Factory Records with the catalogue number FAC 93. (Note: The catalogue number given here is for the UK version.) The follow-up to their breakthrough hit "Blue Monday", it was produced and co-written by influential New York DJ Arthur Baker, charting at No. 1 on the UK Indie Chart, No. 12 on the UK Singles Chart and the top 10 in Ireland and New Zealand, as well as reaching No. 5 on Billboard's Dance Club Songs.

== Music video ==
The video for the single features live footage of the band in concert, intercut with images of nightlife in New York City, specifically at the "Fun House", and producer Arthur Baker and DJ John "Jellybean" Benitez at work.

The Instrumentale version was used as the theme song for the cult segment show Rockline, in the music show "Les Enfants du Rock" in France, in the 80's. The theme song was played over stylised images and footages of London and the postpunk scene of the early 80's.

== Other versions ==
An edit of the Rough Mix represents the single on the 2005 compilation Singles. A re-recorded "Confusion" as well as the original "Confusion Instrumental" appear on the group's 1987 Substance release. The track reappeared on the 1995 remix collection The Rest of New Order as an acid techno remix by Pump Panel, which was used in 1998 as part of the soundtrack for the film Blade. Samples from The Pump Panel remix are featured on the tracks "Operation Blade (Bass in the Place)" by Public Domain, "Play It Louder" by Randy Katana, and "Phatt Bass" by Warp Bros and Aquagen. The 2016 re-release of Singles includes the promo 7" edit of "Confusion".

== Critical reception ==
Considered a disappointing follow-up to "Blue Monday" upon its release, the song has retrospectively gained critical acclaim.

The Guardian placed the song 29th on their list of the 30 best New Order songs, with Alexis Peditris stating that its "improved with age", and that "its wholehearted, charmingly gauche embrace of electro illustrates the impact of New York’s nightlife on the band."

== Track listing ==
All tracks are written by Arthur Baker, Gillian Gilbert, Peter Hook, Stephen Morris and Bernard Sumner; except where indicated.

12": FAC 93 (UK)
No.	Title	Length
1.	"Confusion"	8:12
2.	"Confused Beats"	5:19
3.	"Confusion Instrumental"	7:38
4.	"Confusion" (Rough Mix)	8:04

12": QAL-249 (US) – Minimal Records 1990 release
No.	Title	Length
1.	"Confusion" (Alternative Mix)	5:30
2.	"Confusion" (Essential Mix)	5:10
3.	"Confusion" (Trip 1-Ambient Confusion)	3:40
4.	"Confusion" (a cappella)	1:17
5.	"Confusion" (Con-om-fus-ars-ion Mix)	7:05
6.	"Confusion" (Ooh-Wee Dub)	6:50

CD: FCD260 (UK) – ffrr 1995 release
No.	Title	Length
1.	"Confusion" (Pump Panel Reconstruction Mix)	10:11
2.	"Confusion" (Pump Panel Flotation Mix)	9:15

CD: WACKT002 (UK) – Whacked Records 2002 release
No.	Title	Length
1.	"Confusion" (Koma and Bones Edit)	3:45
2.	"Confusion" (Arthur Baker 2002 Edit)	3:09
3.	"Confusion" (Electroclash Edit)	3:40
4.	"Confusion" (Outputs Nu-Rocktro Edit)	3:41
5.	"Confusion" (Asto Dazed Edit)	4:22

12": CAT 806 EP (UK) – Acid House Mixes by 808 State (1988) – 2004 release
No.	Title	Writer(s)	Length
1.	"Blue Monday" (So Hot Mix)	Gilbert, Hook, Morris, Sumner	7:47
2.	"Confusion" (Acid House Mix)		5:54

- Released in 2004.

== Chart positions ==
Chart (1983)	Peak position
Australia ARIA Singles Chart	72
Irish Singles Chart	7
New Zealand RIANZ Singles Chart	7
UK Singles Chart	12
UK Indie Singles	1
US Billboard Dance/Disco Top 80	5
US Billboard Hot Black Singles	71
Chart (2002)	Peak position
UK Singles Chart ^{[A]}	64
UK Dance ^{[A]}	6

- [A] – Whacked Records re-release
