= John Robie =

American musician, producer and songwriter

- Origin: New York City, United States
- Occupations: Musician, record producer, audio engineer

John Robie is an American musician, producer and songwriter. He has produced and/or written for such artists as: Chaka Khan, New Order, UB40, Cabaret Voltaire, Soulsonic Force, Boy George, Planet Patrol, Laura Branigan, and Freeez, among others.

== Career ==
Robie launched his career as the co-writer and synthesizer "wizard" on Planet Rock by Soulsonic Force.

Robie subsequently went on to produce other hits for Soulsonic Force; Looking for the Perfect Beat and Renegades of Funk (later covered by Rage Against The Machine), and continued to pursue an experimental approach towards electronic music, which resulted in his help pioneering a completely new musical genre, Electro. "One More Shot", performed by C-Bank, and "Body Mechanic", performed by Quadrant 6, both written and produced by Robie, were among the first to define this art form. His songs have been sampled by such artists as City Girls, Lunchmoney Lewis, Snoop Dogg, Calvin Harris, Plump DJs, Jamie xx, LL Cool J, Black Eyed Peas, Limp Bizkit, and Tag Team.

He entered into the world of video/film production making his directorial debut with the short film, The Future Is Mine, which was released in the wake of George Floyd's murder.

== Reception ==
In 1984, Stephen Holden of The New York Times said of Robie and fellow producer Arthur Baker, that they "reinvented the modern dance record as an arcade-like interior soundscape with all kinds of echoes and rhythmic voices in intense push-pull crosscurrents. With their sharply edged synthesized textures, their machine-gun clatter of electronic percussion, and electronically altered vocals that suggested musicalized strobe-light afterimages, Baker and Robie created a sound that evoked the crossfire of urban pressures with the vividness of a horror movie."

Rick Rubin in Rolling Stone described Planet Rock by Soulsonic Force as "one of the most influential songs of everything, it changed the world".

== See also ==
- Afrika Bambaataa
- John Benitez
