= Arthur Baker (producer) =

American record producer and DJ (born 1955)

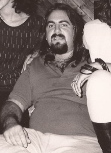
- Baker in 1984

Background information
- Born: April 22, 1955 (age 71); Boston, Massachusetts, U.S.
- Genres: Electro; post-disco; dance; freestyle; old-school hip-hop
- Occupations: Record producer; remixer; DJ
- Years active: 1982–1996, 2006–present
- Labels: A&M/PolyGram; Criminal; Streetwise

Arthur Baker (born April 22, 1955) is an American record producer and DJ best known for his work with hip-hop artists like Afrika Bambaataa and Planet Patrol, as well as British band New Order. He is also known for remixing the Jill Jones song "Mia Bocca" on the 12" single, taken from her self-titled debut album Jill Jones (1987), released on Prince's Paisley Park Records, as well as remixing the Pet Shop Boys song, "In the Night". His remix of the song was used as the main theme for the BBC TV programme The Clothes Show between 1986 and 1994. He also remixed the "Massive Jungle Mix" for Tina Turner's UK top 40 single "Whatever You Want" (co-written by himself, Taylor Dayne and Fred Zarr). Arthur Baker's songs are represented by Downtown Music Publishing.

== Biography ==
=== Early career ===
Arthur Baker was born in Boston, Massachusetts, on April 22, 1955, Baker first worked as a club DJ in Boston in the early-1970s, where he was known for playing crowd-pleasing soul and Philly soul. Nonetheless, he had little patience for DJing, saying in an interview: "[If] I didn't get a good reaction on a record, I'd just rip it off, break it up and throw it on the dancefloor."

Baker's production career started off with a few disco recording sessions in Boston. Legendary disco remixer Tom Moulton, who was signed to Casablanca at the time, was required to release an album of his own as part of the deal for working for the label. Tom's brother Jerry came across the sessions written and recorded by Baker, Tony Carbone, and Larry Wedgeworth and bought them in a deal from Baker. Moulton then remixed the tracks and released them as his 1979 album "T.J.M" Baker talked about the album in an interview with Red Bull Music Academy in 2012.

"Well, when I was in Boston, I went into a recording studio... Intermedia Studios ... the first Aerosmith album was recorded there. I took an engineering course there.... from there I kept on doing things.... I went to my family and I borrowed like a thousand dollars, from my grandmother, my father, just about anyone. Got money from them and I decided to make an album. Something like a Gamble & Huff album. It was like doing a full album with strings on every track. I mean it was crazy, and I probably spent like 15 grand. And then Tom Moulton's brother heard it and said "Oh we love the songs, we'll buy it from you but we're going to re-record everything." So this was the first time I got f***ed in the record business. Listen up for this one! So, basically he said: "Here's the money, you'll get publishing." Because you know, I'd written all the songs. And he said: "We just want the tapes, we're not going to use them but we just want them so we can listen to them better." So of course, I gave him the multitracks, and a year later it came out as T.J.M. He'd used everything I'd done, and he sort of remixed it or mixed it. So, I got a bit screwed on that one."

— Arthur Baker

Baker also released a single under the moniker "North End" on West End Records in 1979, "Kind of Life (Kind of Love)".

=== Remixer/producer ===
In 1981, Baker moved to New York, where he continued to DJ while pursuing a career as a producer. His first successful single was "Happy Days", which he released under the name North End on Emergency Records in 1981.

In the early 1980s, prior to digital recording equipment that would emerge a decade later, Baker and his contemporaries created remixes on analog tape. He worked closely with the Latin Rascals, which were influenced by the earlier work of Tom Moulton, John Morales (of Morales and Munzibai), and Walter Gibbons, the creator of the first commercially available twelve-inch single, a remix of Double Exposure's "Ten Percent". The Latin Rascals would eventually edit the work of every major United States dance-music producer active in the 1980s, but in the early days, the duo was part of Baker's circle.

Baker went on to work for hip-hop label Tommy Boy Records, where he produced Afrika Bambaataa and the Soul Sonic Force's "Planet Rock" single, which was a hit in the summer of 1982. The record combined elements from two Kraftwerk recordings, "Trans Europe Express" and "Numbers", which were interpolated by studio musicians, rather than sampled. Later that year, using unused tracks from "Planet Rock", he later produced Planet Patrol's "Play at Your Own Risk" single in 1982, another group with a hit album in 1983.

Also during 1982, he produced the single "Walking on Sunshine" by Rocker's Revenge featuring Donny Calvin which hit number one on the US Dance chart on September 18 that year.

In 1983, Baker found work doing dance remixes of pop and rock hits, first with Cyndi Lauper's "Girls Just Wanna Have Fun", and Bruce Springsteen's "Dancing in the Dark", "Cover Me", and "Born in the U.S.A." from his Born in the U.S.A. album. Also during 1983, Baker produced the track "I.O.U." by Freeez, which was one of the biggest dance hits of the year in the UK. In 1984, Baker contributed his "Breakers' Revenge" to the Beat Street score and movie soundtrack, which he also helped produce. He is the remixer and additional producer for songs for Hall and Oates ("Out of Touch", "Method of Modern Love", "Possession Obsession", "Dance On Your Knees") and Diana Ross ("Swept Away", co-written and co-produced by Daryl Hall). In 1985, he produced three songs on Jennifer Holliday's album Say You Love Me, the biggest hit being "No Frills Love", a song he co-wrote, co-produced, arranged and remixed. The remixes for Pet Shop Boys' "Suburbia" followed in 1986.

Following these successes, Baker came to the attention of Manchester alternative dance group New Order, who co-wrote "Confusion" with him (and Baker can be seen prominently in the music video of the former). The 12-inch single "Confusion" was a crossover hit on the US dance charts, and established a relationship between Baker and the band that has continued since.

Narrowly missing out on signing the Beastie Boys to his Streetwise Records label, Baker did manage to sign the group New Edition, which had success with its single "Candy Girl".

=== Further collaborations ===
In 1984, Baker worked with Hall & Oates as mix consultant on their album Big Bam Boom, and the result was a markedly urban and electronic sound for the duo. Baker co-wrote the opening instrumental, "Dance On Your Knees", with Daryl Hall. He also remixed that song and the album's other three chart hits: "Out Of Touch", "Method Of Modern Love", and "Possession Obsession". Baker also contributed three remixes to "Tease Me", the lead-off track on (Ohio Players and Parliament Funkadelic alum) Walter "Junie" Morrison's "Evacuate Your Seats" Techno-Freqs EP.

In 1985, Baker helped Bob Dylan complete his Empire Burlesque album as mixer and arranger, and with Little Steven Van Zandt organized and produced the anti-apartheid anthem "Sun City" by Artists United Against Apartheid. He was later honored by the United Nations Special Committee against Apartheid for "high valuable contribution to the international campaign for the elimination of apartheid and the establishment of a non-racial and democratic society in South Africa".

In the late 1980s and later into the 1990s, Baker worked with soul star Al Green, writing and producing the international hit "The Message is Love" and the anti-handgun song "Leave the Guns at Home". In 1989, he released the album Merge on A&M Records as Arthur Baker and the Backbeat Disciples, and remixed Neneh Cherry's debut single "Buffalo Stance". He was also the music supervisor of the films Fried Green Tomatoes and Listen Up – The Lives of Quincy Jones. In 1991, he released a second album under Arthur Baker and the Backbeat Disciples, Give in to the Rhythm.

=== 1990s–2000s ===
In the 1990s, following a break from production for some years, Baker moved to London, and established a chain of successful bars—The Elbow Rooms—across the city. He also owns the Tiny Robot restaurant and The Starland Social Club members bar in London, located in Notting Hill. He continues to work as a DJ and music producer and recently produced "Part-A" for the genre-busting London Electro Metal band Monsta.

The Arthur Baker remix of "Spaceman" by Babylon Zoo was used in the 1995 Levi's commercial "Planet".

In 2006, the financial services company Visa used a Baker-produced track from Afrika Bambaataa's "Looking for the Perfect Beat" as the backing music of a Visa Check Card commercial. In the ad, an animated worm drawn on the pages of a checkbook does the 1980s dance known as the Worm.

== Selected discography ==
=== Wally Jump Jr. & the Criminal Element ===
Year	Single	Peak positions				Album
Year	Single	US Dance	NED	BEL (FLA)	UK	Album
1986	"Jummp-Back"	16	—	—	83	Don't Push Your Luck
1986	"Ain't Gonna Pay One Red Cent"	—	—	—	—	Don't Push Your Luck
1986	"Turn Me Loose"	5	—	—	60	Don't Push Your Luck
1987	"Private Party"	39	—	—	57	Don't Push Your Luck
1987	"Tighten Up (I Just Can't Stop Dancin')"	23	13	11	24	Don't Push Your Luck
1988	"Sworn to Fun" (US only)	—	—	—	—	Don't Push Your Luck
1988	"Thieves" (UK only)	—	—	—	—	Don't Push Your Luck
"—" denotes releases that did not chart or were not released.

=== Criminal Element Orchestra ===
Year	Single	Peak positions		Album
Year	Single	US Dance	UK	Album
1987	"Put the Needle to the Record"	10	63	Locked Up
1989	"When the Funk Hits the Fan"	—	—	Locked Up
1990	"House Time, Anytime" (US only)	—	—	Locked Up
1990	"Everybody (Rap)" (feat. Wendell Williams) (Criminal Element Orchestra credited on UK releases only)	—	30	The Best of Criminal Element Orchestra
1990	"Could It Be I'm Falling in Love" (with Tkeylow) (US only)	—	—	The Best of Criminal Element Orchestra
1991	"What Is the Criminal Element? (La Da Dee La Da Daa)" (feat. Princessa) (US only)	—	—	The Best of Criminal Element Orchestra
1992	"ABC/OPP" (feat. Tim Bryant) (US only)	—	—	The Best of Criminal Element Orchestra
1996	"Go Around" (UK only)	—	89	Single only
"—" denotes releases that did not chart or were not released.

=== Arthur Baker & the Backbeat Disciples ===
Year	Single	Peak positions										Album
Year	Single	US	US R&B	US Dance	AUS	NZ	NED	BEL (FLA)	GER	AUT	UK	Album
1989	"It's Your Time" (feat. Shirley Lewis)	—	—	—	—	—	—	—	—	—	64	Merge
1989	"Talk It Over" (feat. John Warren)	—	—	—	153	—	—	—	—	—	—	Merge
1989	"The Message Is Love" (feat. Al Green)	—	84	39	46	10	12	9	6	4	38	Merge
1990	"Last Thing on My Mind" (feat. John Warren)	—	—	—	—	—	—	—	—	—	—	Merge
1991	"Let There Be Love"	—	—	14	—	—	—	—	—	—	—	Give In to the Rhythm
1991	"Leave the Guns at Home" (feat. Al Green)	—	69	—	—	—	—	—	—	—	—	Give In to the Rhythm
1991	"Kiss the Ground (You Walk On)" (feat. Adele Bertei)	—	—	47	—	—	—	—	—	—	—	Give In to the Rhythm
1992	"I O U" (feat. Nikeeta)	93	—	19	—	—	—	—	—	—	—	Give In to the Rhythm
"—" denotes releases that did not chart or were not released.

=== Other projects ===
Year	Single	Peak positions				Album
Year	Single	US Dance	NED	BEL (FLA)	UK	Album
1984	"Breaker's Revenge"	19	—	—	—	Beat Street OST
1984	"Who You Stealin' From" (by Guru) (US only)	—	—	—	—	Singles only
1986	"(I Want to Go To) Chicago" (by R.T. & the Rockmen Unlimited)	—	—	—	—	Singles only
1987	"Big Love" (by Fleetwood Mac)	7	—	—	—	Singles only
1987	"The Opera House" (by Jack E Makossa)	6	21	10	48	Singles only
1991	"Over & Over" (by Pleasure Pump)	—	—	—	—	Singles only
1991	"Why Can't We See" (by Blind Truth feat. Táta Vega & Toney Lee)	—	—	—	—	Singles only
1993	"Love Is the Key" (by Blind Truth feat. Táta Vega)	—	—	—	—	Singles only
1994	"Boombaata" (by Blind Truth)	—	—	—	—	Singles only
1996	"It's So Hard" (Angel Moraes re-presents Blind Truth)	—	—	—	—	Singles only
1996	"You're Mine" (Arthur Baker presents Blow Out Express) (UK only)	—	—	—	—	Singles only
1996	"Down the Pub" (Blowout Express presents Norman & Christopher) (UK only)	—	—	—	—	Singles only
1997	"Blowout Expressions" (by Arthur Baker presents Blowout Express) (UK only)	—	—	—	—	Singles only
1997	"Stop! Love Patrol" (by Baker/Robie Project)	—	—	—	—	Singles only
1998	"The Break '98"	—	—	—	—	Singles only
1999	"Breaker's Revenge '99" (UK only)	—	—	—	—	Singles only
2002	"Hold Your Head Up" (by Arthur Argent) (UK only)	—	—	—	—	Singles only
2003	"Real Fookin' Noise" (by Arthur Argent) (UK only)	—	—	—	—	Singles only
2003	"Return to New York" (feat. Princess Superstar) (UK only)	—	—	—	—	Singles only
2003	"1000 Years" (feat. Astrid Williamson) (US only)	22	—	—	—	Singles only
2004	"This Feelin'" (by AB/DC) (UK only)	—	—	—	—	Singles only
2006	"Glow" (feat. Tim Wheeler) (UK only)	—	—	—	82	Singles only
2009	"Tear Down the Walls" (feat. Nona Hendryx & Ladonna) (UK only)	—	—	—	—	
"—" denotes releases that did not chart or were not released.

== Books ==
- Baker, Arthur (May 22, 2025). Looking for the Perfect Beat: Remixing and Reshaping Hip-Hop, Rock (First hardcover ed.). London: Faber and Faber. ISBN 9780571387427. OCLC 1446794022.
