= A Collection (video) =

Video by New Order
- Released: 2005
- Label: Rhino/London

New Order chronology
New Order 511 (2002)	A Collection (2005)	Live in Glasgow (2008)

A Collection is a 2005 DVD by the English rock band New Order, featuring the majority of their music videos, as well as three alternate versions, two new videos for older songs, and a live performance. It is New Order's first DVD compilation, their previous video collections, (The Best Of) New Order and Substance, only having been released on VHS or Laserdisc. All regional variations of the DVD are nominally NTSC.

All videos on the DVD are shown in completion, including copyright statements, timing codes and the name/phone number of the companies who did telecine conversions or production of the videos. These elements are rarely, if ever shown on TV or included on DVD releases by other bands.

The DVD was released by Rhino Entertainment, New Order's North American distributors for Warner Music Vision, although all content is copyrighted to London Records, the band's label.

It was also available as part of Item, a limited edition boxed set that collected A Collection and the re-released New Order Story DVD.

== Track listing ==
Source: Discogs

No.	Title	Length
1.	"Confusion"
2.	"The Perfect Kiss"
3.	"Shellshock"
4.	"State of the Nation"
5.	"Bizarre Love Triangle"
6.	"True Faith"
7.	"Touched by the Hand of God"
8.	"Blue Monday '88"
9.	"Fine Time"
10.	"Round & Round"
11.	"Run"
12.	"World in Motion"
13.	"Regret"
14.	"Ruined in a Day"
15.	"World (The Price of Love)"
16.	"Spooky"
17.	"1963"
18.	"Crystal"
19.	"60 Miles an Hour"
20.	"Here to Stay"
21.	"Krafty"
22.	"Jetstream"
23.	"Waiting for the Sirens' Call"
24.	"Round & Round" (USA video)
25.	"Regret" (Top of the Pops performance featuring the cast of Baywatch)
26.	"Crystal" (alternate video by Gina Birch)
27.	"Ceremony" (2005 video)
28.	"Temptation" (Live 1981; from Taras Shevchenko video release)
29.	"Temptation" (2005 video)
