= New Order 511 =

Video by New Order
- Released: 9 December 2002
- Recorded: 9 June 2002
- Length: 89:14
- Label: Warner Music Vision (#0927 49366-2)

New Order chronology
New Order 316 (2001)	New Order 511 (2002)	A Collection (2005)

New Order 511 is a live DVD released by New Order, in 2002 by Warner Music Vision (#0927 49366-2). It features 16 tracks, recorded on 9 June 2002, at Finsbury Park, London. Five of the 16 tracks are Joy Division songs, and 11 of them are New Order songs, hence the title. Participating in the concert are Phil Cunningham, who provided guitar and keyboards, John Simm and backing vocalist Dawn Zee.

== Track listing ==
Source: Digital Fix

1. "Crystal"
2. "Transmission"
3. "Regret"
4. "Ceremony"
5. "60 Miles an Hour"
6. "Atmosphere"
7. "Brutal"
8. "Close Range"
9. "She's Lost Control"
10. "Bizarre Love Triangle"
11. "True Faith"
12. "Temptation"
13. "Love Will Tear Us Apart"
14. "Digital" (featuring John Simm)
15. "Blue Monday"
16. "Your Silent Face"

== DVD Features ==
- Earlier in the Day - pre-concert activity (3:12)
- NewOrder 9802 - interviews and concert footage (13:47)

=== NewOrder 9802 video clips ===
- "Turn My Way", Liverpool Olympia, 18.07.01
- "Confusion", Manchester Apollo, 16.07.98
- "Ceremony", London Alexandra Palace, 31.12.98
- "Heart and Soul", London Alexandra Palace, 31.12.98
- "In a Lonely Place", Manchester Apollo, 16.07.98

== Release ==
The video was released on 9 December 2002 for Region 2, and later released on 7 April 2003 for Region 4, and 21 August 2003 by Rhino Entertainment (R2 970915) for Region 1.
