= Tutti Frutti (New Order song) =

Single by New Order

from the album Music Complete
- Released: 11 December 2015
- Genre: Italo disco
- Length: 6:22
- Label: Mute
- Songwriters: Bernard Sumner; Stephen Morris; Gillian Gilbert; Phil Cunningham; Tom Chapman
- Producer: New Order

New Order singles chronology
"Plastic" (2015)	"Tutti Frutti" (2015)	"Singularity" (2016)

Music video
- "New Order - Tutti Frutti (Official Video)" on YouTube

"Tutti Frutti" is the thirty-fourth single by English band New Order from their tenth studio album, Music Complete (2015). The song was released on 11 December 2015 as the album's second single and features vocals by Elly Jackson of La Roux and spoken Italian phrases by Giacomo Cavagna.

== Release ==
The physical release was preceded by a digital single. The first download single comprised the extended 12” version of "Tutti Frutti" as well as a remix by Hot Chip.

The CD release included the single edit, an alternate 12” mix, and four remixes. A download version of this track listing was also made available through Mute and the band's official webstore. A free download of the Tom Rowlands remix was made available on the band's SoundCloud page on 30 December 2015.

"Tutti Frutti" was released on limited-edition yellow translucent 12-inch vinyl in the United Kingdom and Europe. The Japanese 12-inch single was released on 6 April 2016, and features an exclusive remix by Takkyu Ishino.

== Music video ==
The music video for "Tutti Frutti" was directed by Tom Haines and released in January 2016. Filmed in a Radiotelevizija Slovenija studio, the video stars Italian actor Ricky Tognazzi as a television show host who enjoys one last dance after being forced to retire from hosting.

== Track listings ==
12-inch single
No.	Title	Length
1.	"Tutti Frutti" (Extended 12” Mix)	7:27
2.	"Tutti Frutti" (Hot Chip Remix Vinyl Edit)	8:50

Japanese 12-inch single
No.	Title	Length
1.	"Tutti Frutti" (Extended 12” Mix)	7:27
2.	"Tutti Frutti" (Takkyu Ishino Remix)	7:54

CD single and six-track digital single
No.	Title	Length
1.	"Tutti Frutti" (Single version)	4:17
2.	"Tutti Frutti" (12” Extended Mix 2)	7:30
3.	"Tutti Frutti" (Hot Chip Remix)	11:43
4.	"Tutti Frutti" (Tom Trago's Crazy Days Remix)	10:31
5.	"Tutti Frutti" (Richy Ahmed Remix)	9:02
6.	"Tutti Frutti" (Hallo Halo Remix)	7:02

Two-track digital single
No.	Title	Length
1.	"Tutti Frutti" (Single version)	4:17
2.	"Tutti Frutti" (Hot Chip Remix)	11:43
