= Complete Music =

Remix album by New Order
- Released: 13 May 2016
- Length: 87:46
- Label: Mute
- Producers: New Order; Tom Rowlands; Stuart Price

New Order chronology
Music Complete (2015)	Complete Music (2016)

Complete Music is a remix album by English band New Order, released on 13 May 2016 by Mute Records. It is an alternative version of the band's tenth studio album, Music Complete (2015), featuring extended versions of all 11 tracks from the original album.

== Background ==
The cover features the same geometric design as Music Complete, with a modified colour palette. Two new exclusive mixes of "Nothing but a Fool" and "Superheated" are included, which are different from those on the eight-LP vinyl box set of Music Complete.

Of the release, Bernard Sumner explained:

"We've given [the music] to different mixers, and they've chopped it up and rearranged it and stripped it back, so it's like another take on the original album [...] Some of [the songs] are radically different, but rather than like a remixer who would write a new set of music, they used the music that we'd already incorporated in the songs, but warped it in a way that was very interesting."

== Track listing ==
No.	Title	Length
1.	"Restless" (Extended Mix)	9:29
2.	"Singularity" (Extended Mix)	7:33
3.	"Plastic" (Extended Mix)	9:06
4.	"Tutti Frutti" (Extended Mix)	8:05
5.	"People on the High Line" (Extended Mix)	7:51
6.	"Stray Dog" (Extended Mix)	6:31
7.	"Academic" (Extended Mix)	8:56
8.	"Nothing but a Fool" (Extended Mix 2)	9:09
9.	"Unlearn This Hatred" (Extended Mix)	5:25
10.	"The Game" (Extended Mix)	7:24
11.	"Superheated" (Extended Mix 2)	7:07
Total length:		87:46

== Charts ==
Weekly chart performance for Complete Music
Chart (2016)	Peak position
US Independent Albums (Billboard)	35
US Top Dance Albums (Billboard)	6
