= Live in Glasgow =

Live in Glasgow may refer to:

- Live in Glasgow (Paul Rodgers album)
- Live in Glasgow (Psychic TV album)
- Live in Glasgow (New Order DVD)
