= Sink or Swim (song) =

Single by Bad Lieutenant

from the album Never Cry Another Tear
- Released: 28 September 2009 (digital download, 7"); 22 February 2010 (remix bundle)
- Recorded: 2007–2009
- Genre: Alternative rock
- Length: 3:59
- Label: Triple Echo Records
- Songwriters: Bernard Sumner, Phil Cunningham, Jake Evans
- Producers: Bernard Sumner, Bad Lieutenant

Bad Lieutenant singles chronology
"Sink or Swim" (2009)	"Twist of Fate" (2010)

"Sink or Swim" is the debut release and first single by Bad Lieutenant. It appears as the first track on their debut album Never Cry Another Tear. It was released on 28 September 2009. The single was backed with the fellow album track "Dynamo". The single did not chart in the UK, though sales were likely impacted as both songs had already been released for free through the band's websites prior to the official release that September. In February 2010, to accompany the band's first UK tour, a digital remix bundle was released with remixes by Mark Reeder, James Bright and The Teenagers.

== Track listing ==
All tracks are written by Phil Cunningham, Jake Evans, Bernard Sumner.

7" Vinyl/Digital Download
No.	Title	Length
1.	"Sink or Swim (Single version)"	3:59
2.	"Dynamo"	4:23

Never Cry Another Tear Deluxe Edition bonus 7" vinyl
No.	Title	Length
1.	"Sink or Swim (Acoustic Mix)"
2.	"Higher Wider Deeper"	3:21

Digital Remix Bundle
No.	Title	Length
1.	"Sink or Swim"	4:11
2.	"Sink or Swim (Reeder's Rettungsring Remix)"	7:42
3.	"Sink or Swim (Reeder's Waterwing Remix)"	9:25
4.	"Sink or Swim (James Bright Remix)"	5:14
5.	"Dynamo (Teenagers Remix)"	3:41

Release History

- 7" Vinyl
- 7" Vinyl limited (bundled with deluxe versions of Never Cry Another Tear)
- Digital Download
- Digital Remix Bundle

== Personnel ==
Musicians

- Phil Cunningham - Guitar, Keyboards, Bass
- Jake Evans - Guitar, Backing Vocals, Keyboards, Bass
- Bernard Sumner - Vocals, Guitar, Keyboards, Bass
- Jack Mitchell - Drums ("Sink or Swim")
- Matt Evans - Drums ("Dynamo"), Backing Vocals

Technical

- Bernard Sumner and Bad Lieutenant - Production
- Chris Taylor - Additional Engineering ("Dynamo")
- Stephen Marsh - Additional Engineering ("Dynamo")
- Justin Richards - Additional Engineering ("Sink or Swim")
- Danny Davies - Mixing
- Frank Arkwright - Mastering
- Danny Davies - Recording
- Andrew Robinson and Jake Evans - Additional Recording
