= New Order 316 =

Video by New Order
- Released: April 2001
- Recorded: 18 November 1981 at the Ukrainian National Home (Taras Shevchenko) in New York City and 30 August 1998 at the Reading Festival in England
- Length: New York: 52:28, Reading: 54:49
- Label: London Records (90 Ltd 8573-84802-2)
- Producer: Geoff Foulkes, Richard Leyland

New Order chronology
New Order Story (1993)	New Order 316 (2001)	New Order 511 (2002)

New Order 316 is a live DVD released by New Order, in 2001 by Warner Music Vision and London Records. It consists of two concerts. The first took place on 18 November 1981 at the Ukrainian National Home (Taras Shevchenko) in the East Village of New York City, and features 9 tracks. The second took place at the Reading Festival on 30 August 1998, and features 11 tracks. The DVD title is derived from the combined set list of 3 Joy Division and 16 New Order tracks.

The 1981 recording was previously released by Factory Records as the VHS/Beta video tape Taras Shevchenko in 1983.

== Track listing ==
Source: New Order Discography

=== New York 81 ===
The video opens with scenes featuring a digitised version of the Taras Shevchenko self-portrait. The video artwork was done by graphic designer Peter Saville and produced by Michael Shamberg.

1. "Chosen Time" (Note: Although the track listing shows "I.C.B.", the song played was "Chosen Time".)
2. "Dreams Never End"
3. "Everything's Gone Green"
4. "Truth"
5. "Senses"
6. "Procession"
7. "Ceremony"
8. "Denial"
9. "Temptation"

Following the concert, the Taras Shevchenko video is shown again but without any background music.

Runtime: 52:28

=== Reading Festival 30 August 98 ===
1. "Regret"
2. "Touched by the Hand of God"
3. "Isolation"
4. "Atmosphere"
5. "Heart and Soul"
6. "Paradise"
7. "Bizarre Love Triangle"
8. "True Faith"
9. "Temptation"
10. "Blue Monday"
11. "World in Motion"

Runtime: 54:49

== DVD Features ==
- "and in conversation" – New Order Documentary (25:46) filmed 5 September 2000 with footage from the Reading Festival 98 and the Ampersand Club, Manchester on 27 March 2000. The video opens with a video clip of "Temptation" at the Reading Festival but redubbed with the music version of "Temptation 98".

== Release ==
The video was released on DVD in April 2001 for Region 2 by London Records (90 Ltd 8573-84802-2). It was released in 2001 for Japan and Brazil by Warner Music Vision and Warner Music Brazil, respectively. In 2003, the video was released by Rhino Records (R2 970194) for Region 1.
