= Restless (New Order song) =

Single by New Order

from the album Music Complete
- Released: July 28, 2015(digital download)
- Recorded: 2014–2015
- Genre: Electronic rock
- Length: 4:32 (single version); 5:28 (album version); 8:14 (12" extended mix)
- Label: Mute
- Songwriter: New Order
- Producer: New Order

New Order singles chronology
"Guilt Is a Useless Emotion" (2006)	"Restless" (2015)	"Plastic" (2015)

"Restless" is the thirty-second single by English rock band New Order, released on 28 July 2015 to promote their tenth album, Music Complete. This is the first single, as well as new material, New Order has released in a decade since 2005's single, "Waiting for the Sirens' Call", as well as the first single featuring Tom Chapman replacing former bassist and founding member Peter Hook. The song's concept revolves around greed and consumption.

The song has received generally favourable reviews. The overall composition, as well as its catchy tune and lyrics were praised.

== Background ==
This is the first single released since 2005, as well as the return of Gillian Gilbert and the introduction of Tom Chapman.

Music Complete was announced from 2 September 2014 through 22 June 2015 on Stereogum, Consequence of Sound, as well as other places, including the band's official website. They all hinted at a future release of an LP, as well as other future releases.

On 28 July, the single was released as a format of digital download. A physical CD and 12" vinyl with additional remixes were released later on 6 October.

== Reception ==
The song received generally favourable reviews. Its catchy tune, lyrics and originality were praised but critics were divided by its tightness and uptight production.

Billboard described it as "..tepid, restrained, and a little blasé", but went on to state that if so, "will be nestled firmly on the rock side of New Order's extensive catalogue." Rolling Stone described it as "triumphant", as well as its significance to their 1985 release of Low-Life.

== Music video ==
The official music video for the song was uploaded to their official Vevo and YouTube accounts on 18 August 2015.

=== Synopsis ===
The overall plot of the music video is as abstract as its visuals. While the music video goes on, found footage are shown periodically, with many women standing with T-shirts that have enscripted lyrics on them, as well as a partially naked women, intercut footage, kissing, and brief sessions of breaking through the fourth wall.

A group of people are standing at an ancient rock, which holds a mighty sword, a possible retelling of King Arthur. While the others don't get it out, a man does successfully, to the awe of others. At the same time, a teenager at a rave party is dubbed a king and crowned. The party then moves to the sewers, where the "king" has a grand feast with other visitors, where a teenage girl and boy presumably fall in love at first sight. At the same time somewhere else, a fight ensues, and a man saves a woman before they're knocked out. Back at the party, the "king" is enjoying his popularity by crowdsurfing through the fans, while the man who picked up the sword is held up as well. In the final moments of the film, the same man and another women are being transported to a castle by knights carrying a flag.

== Track listing ==
All tracks are written by New Order.

No.	Title	Length
1.	"Restless" (single version)	4:32
2.	"Restless" (extended 12" mix)	8:14
3.	"Restless" (Agoria Remix)	6:48
4.	"Restless" (xxxy Build Up Mix)	6:47
5.	"Restless" (RAC Mix)	6:44
6.	"Restless" (Andrew Weatherall Remix)	7:47
Total length:		40:51

== Charts ==
Chart (2015)	Peak position
Belgium (Ultratip Bubbling Under Wallonia)	39
