= Never Cry Another Tear =

Studio album by Bad Lieutenant
- Released: 12 October 2009
- Recorded: 2007–2009
- Genre: Alternative rock
- Length: 53:22
- Labels: Triple Echo Records, Original Signal
- Producers: Bad Lieutenant, Bernard Sumner

Never Cry Another Tear is the only studio album by Bad Lieutenant. It was released in the UK on 12 October 2009, and in the US on 10 November 2009. New Order member Bernard Sumner formed the group with Jake Evans and Phil Cunningham. The three guitarists wrote and performed the album together with a number of additional musicians. During recording sessions Blur bassist Alex James and New Order drummer Stephen Morris worked with the band on some of the tracks.

== Release ==
Never Cry Another Tear was released in several formats, namely: A Standard 12 track CD, Limited Edition Digipak CD with two bonus tracks, an iTunes Digital download with 3 bonus tracks and a Double-LP Vinyl. These versions were followed one week later on 19 October by Box set versions, namely: A Deluxe Boxset consisting of the CD with bonus tracks an LP without the bonus tracks plus a 7" vinyl single, 12" booklet and an artwork print. A further Super Deluxe Boxset was released which featured all of the deluxe contents with a T-shirt.

The album reached #70 in its first week on the UK Albums Chart. Sales were accounted from digital downloads and the regular CD version.

Never Cry Another Tear was promoted by two singles. "Sink or Swim" backed with "Dynamo" was the lead single, and was released on 28 September 2009. "Twist of Fate" was selected as the second single, it was backed with a remix of "Poisonous Intent", and was released on 22 March 2010. Neither single charted in the UK.

== Critical response ==
Professional ratings
Aggregate scores
Source	Rating
Metacritic	59/100
Review scores
Source	Rating
AllMusic	3.5/5 stars
The A.V. Club	(B)
BBC	(favourable)
Daily Music Guide	3.5/5 stars
Drowned in Sound	5/10 stars
The Guardian	3/5 stars
The Independent	3/5 stars
Pitchfork Media	(4.1/10)
PopMatters	6/10 stars
Positivexposure	5/5 stars
The Quietus	(favourable)

Never Cry Another Tear received a generally mixed response from critics. At Metacritic, which assigns a normalised score out of 100 to reviews from mainstream critics, the album received a score of 59, based on 11 reviews, indicating "mixed or average reviews". Many reviews focused on the departure of Peter Hook, John Bush writing for AllMusic guide writes: "Never Cry Another Tear accentuates the melodic guitar pop and straightforward lyricism of New Order's work in the 2000s. Although Hook is missed, the low end sounds quite good indeed in the capable hands of Chapman and [Alex] James". Though few reviews were negative outright, many were lukewarm about the group's less-electronic direction. Tom Ewing of Pitchfork Media described the album as "A specifically British strain of guitar rock, in fact, with the rhythm section sidelined and the guitars themselves often blending into a mid-range soup with keyboards and backing vocals".

== Track listing ==
All songs written and composed by Phil Cunningham, Jake Evans, Bernard Sumner except where noted.

No.	Title	Writer(s)	Length
1.	"Sink or Swim"		4:10
2.	"Twist of Fate"	Phil Cunningham, Jake Evans, Bernard Sumner, Matt Evans	4:10
3.	"Summer Days" (Initially titled "Summer Days on Holiday")		5:05
4.	"This is Home"		4:39
5.	"Running Out of Luck"	Phil Cunningham, Jake Evans, Bernard Sumner, Stephen Morris, Tom Chapman	5:02
6.	"Dynamo"		4:23
7.	"Poisonous Intent"		4:41
8.	"These Changes"		4:32
9.	"Walk on Silver Water"	Phil Cunningham, Jake Evans, Bernard Sumner, Alex James	4:59
10.	"Shine Like the Sun"	Phil Cunningham, Jake Evans, Bernard Sumner, Alex James	4:17
11.	"Runaway"	Phil Cunningham, Jake Evans, Bernard Sumner, Stephen Morris	4:17
12.	"Head into Tomorrow"		4:27

Bonus tracks
No.	Title	Writer(s)	Length
1.	"Falling Trees"	Phil Cunningham, Jake Evans, Bernard Sumner, Alex James, Carl Jackson	3:32
2.	"Split the Atom"	Phil Cunningham, Jake Evans, Bernard Sumner, Alex James, Carl Jackson	4:07
3.	"Higher Wider Deeper" (Japanese bonus track and Deluxe edition bonus 7")		3:21
4.	"How Long" (iTunes bonus track)		3:34
5.	"Sink Or Swim (Acoustic Mix)" (Deluxe edition bonus 7")

== Personnel ==
Bad Lieutenant

- Bernard Sumner – vocals, guitars, keyboards, bass, scaleta
- Jake Evans – vocals, guitars, keyboards, bass, harmonica
- Phil Cunningham – guitars, keyboards, bass

Guest musicians

- Matt Evans – backing vocals (1, 2, 4, 6, 7, 10, 11, 12, 13), drums (2, 6)
- Jack Mitchell – drums (1, 3, 4, 9, 10)
- Tom Chapman – bass (5)
- Stephen Morris – drums (5, 11), programming (7)
- Alex James – bass (9, 10, 13, 14)
- Carl Jackson – drums (13, 14)

== Versions ==
- Standard CD (12 tracks)
- Limited Edition Digipak (14 tracks)
- Deluxe Boxset (CD & LP, plus exclusive 7" vinyl single, 12" Bad Lieutenant booklet and artwork print)
- Super Deluxe Boxset (CD & LP, plus same contents as above along with an exclusive T-shirt)
- Digital Download – iTunes (15 tracks)
