= Lost Sirens =

Studio album by New Order
- Released: 11 January 2013
- Recorded: 2003–2004
- Studios: Real World (Box, England)
- Genre: Synth-pop
- Length: 38:21
- Label: Rhino
- Producers: Tore Johansson; New Order; Stuart Price; Mac Quayle; Jim Spencer; Stephen Street

New Order chronology
| Waiting for the Sirens' Call (2005) | Lost Sirens (2013) | Music Complete (2015) |

Lost Sirens is the ninth studio album by English rock band New Order. It was released on 11 January 2013 by Rhino Entertainment. The tracks featured on the album were recorded during the production of 2005's Waiting for the Sirens' Call.

It is the final album featuring bassist Peter Hook, who left the band in 2007 (six years before the album's release), the final album to feature the band as a quartet, and the only album by New Order produced from archival recordings. Lost Sirens drew mostly positive reviews, and it sold 4,678 copies in its first week in the United Kingdom.

== Release ==
Lost Sirens was originally scheduled for release in late 2012. In a Brazilian interview to promote the reunited band's appearance in São Paulo, Gilbert acknowledged issues with former member Hook, and stated there was "a lot going on behind the scenes on the copyright" delaying the album. The band announced in December 2012 that the album would be released on 14 January 2013. Prior to release, the album was streamed on the Rolling Stone official website from 11 January 2013.

== Critical reception ==
Professional ratings
Aggregate scores
| Source | Rating |
|---|---|
| Metacritic | 65/100 |
Review scores
| Source | Rating |
| AllMusic | 3.5/5 stars |
| The A.V. Club | C |
| Consequence of Sound | 3.5/5 stars |
| The Independent | 3/5 stars |
| Metro | 3/5 stars |
| MusicOMH | 3.5/5 stars |
| NME | 6/10 |
| Pitchfork | 6.8/10 |
| PopMatters | 7/10 |
| Rolling Stone | 3.5/5 stars |

Lost Sirens received generally positive reviews from music critics. At Metacritic, which assigns a normalised rating out of 100 to reviews from mainstream publications, the album received an average score of 65, based on 14 reviews.

The Independent's Andy Gill claimed that New Order's ninth outing "actually bests its parent album [Waiting for the Sirens' Call]". Gill particularly cited "I Told You So", "Sugarcane" and "Hellbent" as the album's better tracks. Metro stated the album "offers few classics but will still delight fans of the band with its feelgood sound".

== Track listing ==
All tracks are written by Bernard Sumner, Peter Hook, Stephen Morris and Phil Cunningham.

Lost Sirens track listing
| No. | Title | Length |
|---|---|---|
| 1. | "I'll Stay with You" | 4:22 |
| 2. | "Sugarcane" | 4:50 |
| 3. | "Recoil" | 5:09 |
| 4. | "Californian Grass" | 4:35 |
| 5. | "Hellbent" | 4:27 |
| 6. | "Shake It Up" | 5:23 |
| 7. | "I've Got a Feeling" | 4:29 |
| 8. | "I Told You So" (Crazy World Mix) | 5:06 |

== Personnel ==
Credits adapted from the liner notes of Lost Sirens.

- New Order – production
- Stephen Street – production, mixing (tracks 1, 4, 5, 7)
- Cenzo Townshend – mixing (tracks 1, 2, 4–7)
- Tore Johansson – production (track 2)
- Jim Spencer – production (track 3); mixing (tracks 3, 8)
- Mac Quayle – production (track 6)
- Stuart Price – production (track 8)
- Frank Arkwright – mastering
- Studio Parris Wakefield – art direction, design

== Charts ==
Chart performance for Lost Sirens
| Chart (2013) | Peak position |
|---|---|
| Australian Albums (ARIA) | 171 |
| Belgian Albums (Ultratop Flanders) | 192 |
| Belgian Albums (Ultratop Wallonia) | 155 |
| French Albums (SNEP) | 137 |
| German Albums (Offizielle Top 100) | 68 |
| Scottish Albums (Official Charts) | 27 |
| Swiss Albums (Schweizer Hitparade) | 74 |
| UK Albums (Official Charts) | 23 |

== Release history ==
Release history for Lost Sirens
| Region | Date | Label |
|---|---|---|
| Netherlands | 11 January 2013 | Warner |
| France | 14 January 2013 | Warner |
| United Kingdom | 14 January 2013 | Rhino |
| Australia | 18 January 2013 | Warner |
| Germany | 18 January 2013 | Warner |
| Italy | 29 January 2013 | Warner |
| Japan | 6 March 2013 | Warner |
