= Republic (album) =

Studio album by New Order
- Released: 3 May 1993
- Recorded: 1992
- Studios: Real World (Box, England); RAK (London, England)
- Genres: Alternative pop; dance-rock; dance-pop; synth-pop; Eurodance
- Length: 47:37
- Label: CentreDate Co Ltd/London
- Producers: Stephen Hague; New Order

New Order chronology
Technique (1989)	Republic (1993)	(the best of) New Order (1994)

Singles from Republic
- 1. "Regret" Released: 5 April 1993; 2. "Ruined in a Day" Released: 21 June 1993; 3. "World (The Price of Love)" Released: 23 August 1993; 4. "Spooky" Released: 6 December 1993

Professional ratings
Review scores
Source	Rating
AllMusic	4/5 stars
Blender	2/5 stars
Entertainment Weekly	B−
Los Angeles Times	2.5/4 stars
NME	8/10
Q	4/5 stars
Rolling Stone	4/5 stars
The Rolling Stone Album Guide	3/5 stars
Select	3/5
Vox	7/10

Republic (stylised as Republic©) is the sixth studio album by the English rock band New Order. It was first released on 3 May 1993 in the United Kingdom by CentreDate Co Ltd in association with London Records and on 11 May 1993 in the United States by Qwest and Warner Bros. Records. It was the band's first album following the demise of their former label Factory Records, and would be their last studio album for eight years until 2001's Get Ready.

Republic became New Order's second consecutive album to top the UK Albums Chart, and was nominated for the 1993 Mercury Music Prize. In the United States, it reached number 11 on the Billboard 200, the band's highest-peaking album on the chart to date. Its lead single "Regret" became New Order's last top-five entry on the UK singles chart. The band went on hiatus following a gig at the Reading Festival in promotion of the album in August 1993. Lead singer Bernard Sumner was known to dislike travelling to North America, and media reports suggested that the pressure of the long leg there contributed to the band's temporary demise, although they reunited in 1998.

== Background ==
According to bassist Peter Hook, the band were forced to make the album in order to save The Haçienda, a Manchester club partially owned by the band that was losing a great deal of money. The band were also told that if they did not produce another album, Factory Records would go bankrupt and the band members, who had guaranteed loans for Factory and the club, would be ruined financially.

At the same time, Hook and Bernard Sumner were "at that point in the relationship where you hate each others' stinking guts," and the band members were "all off our heads on various things," which made for a stressful working environment. While Sumner was recording with Johnny Marr as Electronic, Hook, Stephen Morris and Gillian Gilbert wrote a whole instrumental New Order album that would be shelved at the request of Sumner when he returned. Disputes over the music and publishing rights created further acrimony that caused the band to break up, though they reunited in 1998 and recorded two more studio albums before Hook departed for good.

Hook later revealed that touring to support an album he "didn't like at all" appalled him. They used a new 16-track record for the backing which allowed them to play multiple guitars on the tape. Hook retrospectively analyzed: "we were turning into the sort of group we used to hate ... we were basically miming".

== Artwork ==
As with previous New Order releases, Republic's artwork was designed by Peter Saville and no text other than credits appears within the sleeve. Saville, who had relocated to California, depicted different aspects of the state—people relaxing on the beach while houses burn (a reference to frequent wildfires or the 1992 Los Angeles riots) and vast natural landscapes contrasting with the skyline of Los Angeles. Most of the images were taken from stock photo libraries to achieve a commercial look, and were heavily retouched. Several of these images have been used elsewhere, such as direct-mail campaigns, catalogues and adverts for businesses. Another interpretation of the album's artwork alludes to the Fall of Rome.

== Track listing ==
All tracks are written by Gillian Gilbert, Peter Hook, Stephen Morris, Bernard Sumner and Stephen Hague.

No.	Title	Length
1.	"Regret"	4:08
2.	"World"	4:44
3.	"Ruined in a Day"	4:23
4.	"Spooky"	4:44
5.	"Everyone Everywhere"	4:25
6.	"Young Offender"	4:48
7.	"Liar"	4:22
8.	"Chemical"	4:11
9.	"Times Change"	3:53
10.	"Special"	4:51
11.	"Avalanche"	3:15
Total length:		47:37

Japanese edition bonus tracks
No.	Title	Length
12.	"Regret" (Sabres Slow 'n' Low Mix)	12:50
13.	"Regret" (Sabres Fast 'n' Throb Mix)	12:17
Total length:		72:47

== Personnel ==
=== New Order ===
Musician credits for New Order are not listed in the liner notes of the album's personnel. Below are the instruments that the group typically plays.

- Bernard Sumner – vocals, guitars, synthesisers and programming
- Peter Hook – bass guitar
- Stephen Morris – drums, synthesisers and programming
- Gillian Gilbert – synthesisers, guitars and programming; vocal on "Avalanche"

=== Production ===
The original liner notes list the album's personnel as follows:

- Gillian Gilbert, Peter Hook, Stephen Morris, Bernard Sumner and Stephen Hague – writer
- New Order and Stephen Hague – producer
- Pascal Gabriel – pre-production ("Regret" and "Young Offender")
- Simon Gogerly, Mike 'Spike' Drake, Owen Morris and Richard Chappell – engineer
- Ben Findlay – assistant engineer
- Sam Hardaker – assistant engineer
- Audrey Riley – cello, string arrangements
- David Rhodes – additional guitar
- Andy Duncan – additional programming
- Dee Lewis – backing vocals
- Recorded and mixed at Real World and RAK
- Peter Saville – art direction (designed at Pentagram)

== Charts ==
=== Weekly charts ===
Weekly chart performance for Republic
Chart (1993)	Peak position
Australian Albums (ARIA)	5
Canada Top Albums/CDs (RPM)	9
Dutch Albums (Album Top 100)	47
European Albums (Music & Media)	14
Finnish Albums (Suomen virallinen lista)	21
French Albums (IFOP)	39
German Albums (Offizielle Top 100)	54
Japanese Albums (Oricon)	52
New Zealand Albums (RMNZ)	24
Swedish Albums (Sverigetopplistan)	13
UK Albums (Official Charts)	1
US Billboard 200	11

=== Year-end charts ===
Year-end chart performance for Republic
Chart (1993)	Position
Canada Top Albums/CDs (RPM)	29
UK Albums (OCC)	47

== Certifications ==
Certifications for Republic
Region	Certification	Certified units/sales
Canada (Music Canada)	Gold	50,000^{^}
United Kingdom (BPI)	Gold	100,000^{^}
United States (RIAA)	Gold	382,000
^{^} Shipments figures based on certification alone.
