= Someone like You (New Order song) =

2001 single by New Order

"Someone Like You"

Single by New Order

from the album Get Ready
- Released: 6 December 2001
- Length: 5:42
- Label: London
- Songwriters: Bernard Sumner, Peter Hook, Stephen Morris, Gillian Gilbert
- Producers: Steve Osborne, New Order

New Order singles chronology
"60 Miles an Hour" (2001)	"Someone Like You" (2001)	"Here to Stay" (2002)

Alternative cover
- Cover of the other UK/European 12-inch vinyl single

"Someone Like You" is a single by New Order released in December 2001. It was remixed by Futureshock, Gabriel & Dresden, James Holden and Funk D'void. It was the twenty-seventh single released by the band.

== Track listing ==
All tracks are written by Gillian Gilbert, Peter Hook, Stephen Morris and Bernard Sumner.

2x12": NUOX10 (UK & Europe)
No.	Title	Length
1.	"Someone Like You" (Futureshock Vocal Remix)	8:04
2.	"Someone Like You" (Gabriel & Dresden 911 Vocal Mix)	11:13
3.	"Someone Like You" (Futureshock Stripdown Mix)	7:49
4.	"Someone Like You" (Gabriel & Dresden Voco-Tech Dub)	11:00

12": NUOXX10 (UK & Europe)
No.	Title	Length
1.	"Someone Like You" (James Holden Heavy Dub)	9:59
2.	"Someone Like You" (Funk D'void Remix)	9:57

2x12": PRO-A-100804 (US)
No.	Title	Length
1.	"Someone Like You" (Futureshock Vox Remix)	8:04
2.	"Someone Like You" (Funk D'void Remix)	9:56
3.	"Someone Like You" (Gabriel & Dresden 911 Vocal Mix)	11:13
4.	"Someone Like You" (James Holden Heavy Dub Edit)	6:43
5.	"Someone Like You" (Futureshock Strip Down Mix)	7:49
6.	"Someone Like You" (Gabriel & Dresden Voco-Tech Dub)	11:10

== Chart positions ==
Chart (2001)	Peak position
US Billboard Hot Dance Club Play	34
