= Bad Lieutenant (band) =

English rock band (2008–2011)

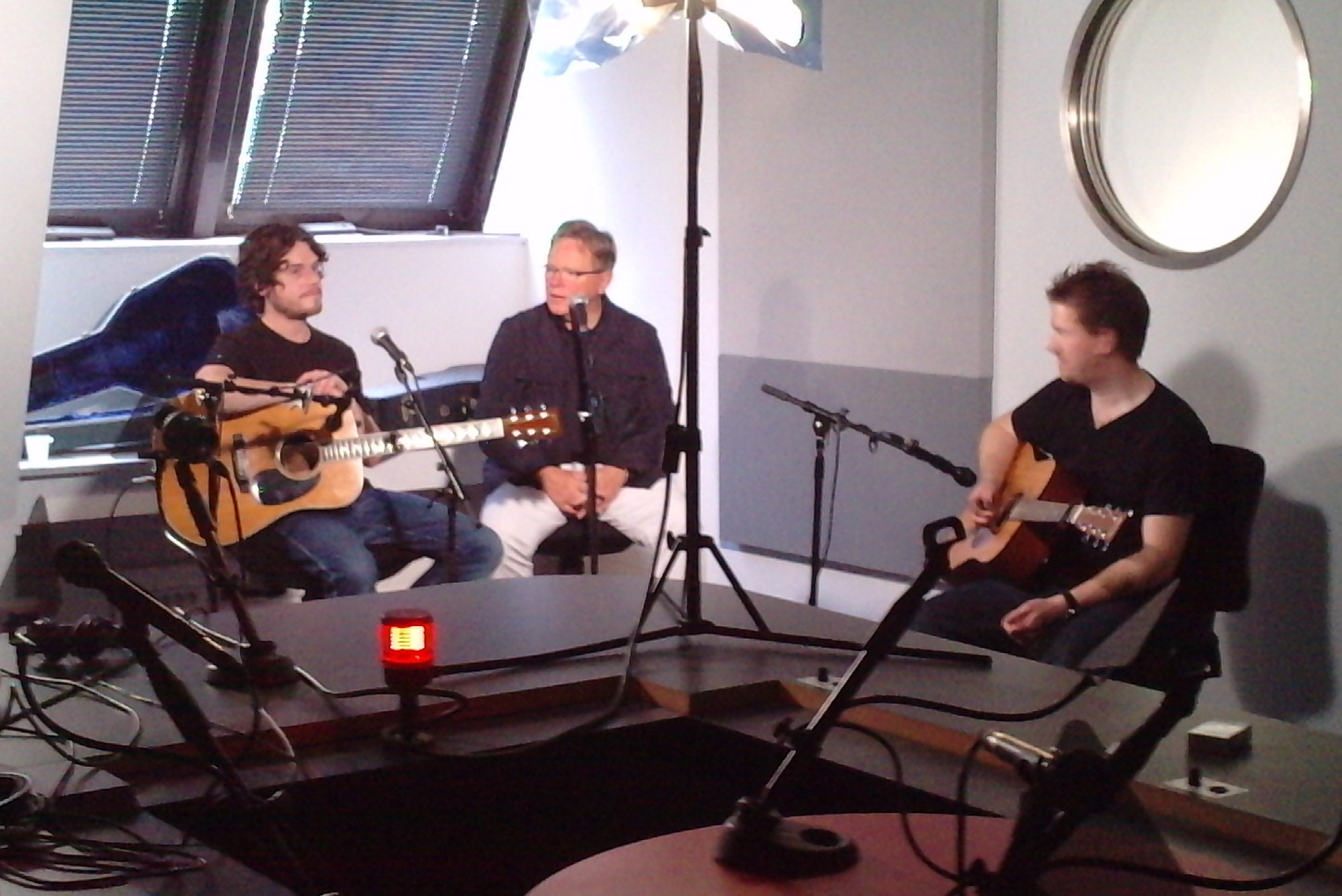
- Bad Lieutenant performing in 2009

Background information
- Genres: Alternative rock
- Years active: 2008–2011
- Labels: Triple Echo, Original Signal
- Past members: Bernard Sumner; Phil Cunningham; Jake Evans

Bad Lieutenant was an English alternative rock supergroup formed following the second breakup of New Order. The band consisted of then-former New Order members Bernard Sumner and Phil Cunningham as well as Rambo & Leroy's Jake Evans.

The name of the band is taken from the 1992 film Bad Lieutenant directed by Abel Ferrara, which a friend of Johnny Marr's was watching when Sumner visited Marr's house.

== History ==
=== Formation ===
In May 2007, New Order's Peter Hook was interviewed by British radio station XFM and asked if New Order was over. He announced that he and Bernard Sumner were no longer working together. After Hook's announcement, a spokesperson for the band denied the claims and said that with or without Hook, New Order would continue to make music. However, in 2008, Bernard Sumner announced that there were no plans for more New Order albums.

In 2008, Bad Lieutenant formed, including both Bernard Sumner and Phil Cunningham of New Order, as well as Rambo and Leroy's Jake Evans. Their debut album Never Cry Another Tear also features appearances by Stephen Morris of New Order (drums), Jack Mitchell (drums), Tom Chapman (bass) and Alex James of Blur (bass). In July 2009 an article in a local newspaper, Stephen Morris discussed his participation in the new band, following the demise of New Order: "I'm only on a few tracks, but it's great to be playing with them again." The live band included Morris on drums and Chapman on bass.

=== 2009–2011: Never Cry Another Tear ===
On 2 July 2009, Bernard Sumner confirmed that single "Sink or Swim" would be released on 28 September 2009 and would be the first off the album Never Cry Another Tear. The single was hosted for free on the band's website prior to its physical release; it was followed by a digital bundle release with remixes of the song by Berlin-based music producer Mark Reeder, as well as James Bright and The Teenagers.

The band set off on a tour of the UK throughout October and November 2009. The band scheduled and subsequently cancelled four U.S. tour dates. They then supported the Pet Shop Boys on the British leg of their Pandemonium Tour. An additional tour of the U.S. was scheduled for April 2010, but was cancelled due to the Icelandic volcano eruptions.

"Twist of Fate" was released as the second single on 22 March 2010, backed with a remix of "Poisonous Intent". It was followed by a digital bundle of remixes by Mark Reeder, AK47, Koishii & Hush, and James Bright. The group held a contest for fans to create the official video of the song.

The group spent the summer performing at a number of European music festivals. On 11 June 2010, the group supported Ian Brown in a special day-long concert at Platt Fields Park in Manchester. The band performed songs from their album as well as a number of New Order and Joy Division tracks.

The group contributed a cover of "In the Ghetto" for the charity album Key To Change in aid of Centrepoint; a charity that provides shelter and support for young homeless people in the UK.

On 17 February 2011, Jake Evans announced via the group's MySpace that the group were working on new material, although no dates were given for an album or single release at this time.

On 11 March 2011, the group announced that they would be headlining Friends of Mine Festival at Capesthorne Hall on Friday 20 May alongside The Charlatans, The Lightning Seeds, Buzzcocks, The Fall, The Cribs, The Farm, John Cooper Clarke, Mr Scruff and Goldblade.

The band are now on an indefinite hiatus since Sumner and Cunningham's return to New Order. Evans is currently working on new solo material and supported New Order on their tour in early 2012.

== Band members ==
- Bernard Sumner - lead and backing vocals, guitar, keyboards
- Phil Cunningham - guitar, keyboards
- Jake Evans - lead and backing vocals, guitar, keyboards

Touring members

- Stephen Morris - drums
- Tom Chapman - bass

== Discography ==
=== Studio album ===
Year	Album details	Peak chart positions	
Year	Album details	UK	FR
2009	Never Cry Another Tear: Released: 10 November 2009; Label: Original Signal; Formats: CD, digital download, 2x Vinyl, Boxset	70	89

=== Singles ===
Year	Title	Album
2009	"Sink or Swim"	Never Cry Another Tear
2010	"Sink or Swim Remix Bundle"	Never Cry Another Tear
2010	"Twist of Fate"	Never Cry Another Tear
2011	"Twist of Fate Remix Bundle"	Never Cry Another Tear
