= Tom Chapman =

Franco-British musician (born 1972)

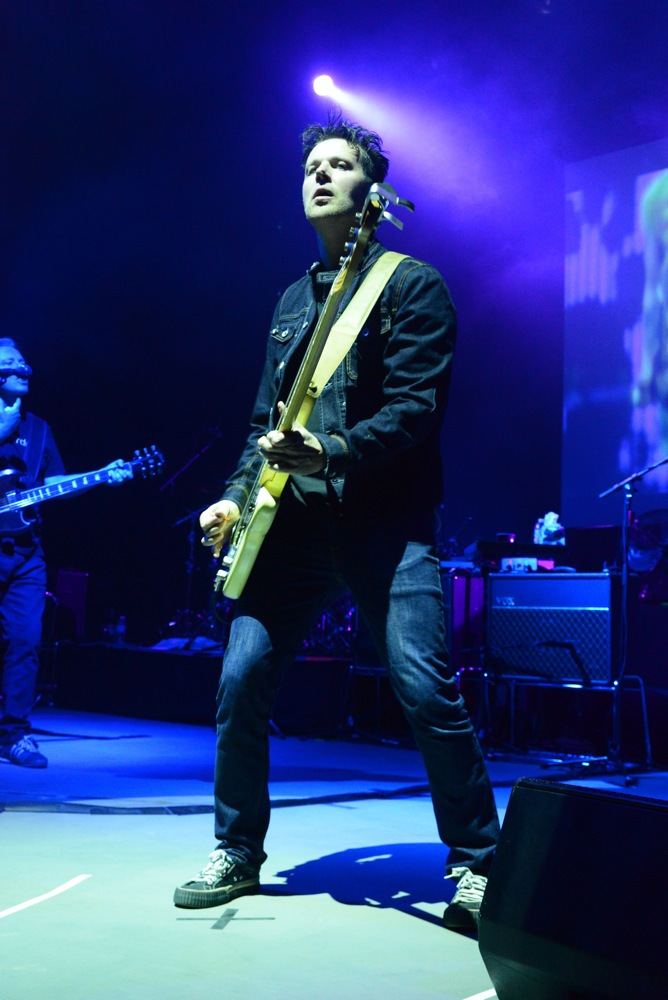
- Chapman in 2013

Background information
- Born: Thomas Louis Chapman; 15 May 1972 (age 54); Chevreuse, France
- Instruments: Bass; guitar; keyboards

Thomas Louis Chapman (born 15 May 1972) is a French-British musician, producer and songwriter, best known as being the bass guitarist of English rock band New Order. He is also one of the founding members of Anglo-American group ShadowParty and more recently in 2020, Sea Fever.

== Bad Lieutenant ==
Chapman joined English alternative rock band Bad Lieutenant, formed by Bernard Sumner during a break from New Order, in 2009 as bass player. The band also featured Phil Cunningham (guitars), Jake Evans (guitars and vocals), Alex James (bass), Jack Mitchell (drums), and Stephen Morris (drums).

In addition to performing on the debut Bad Lieutenant album Never Cry Another Tear, Chapman also played on tour with the band for their live shows across the UK and Europe during 2009 and 2010.

== New Order ==
In September 2011, New Order played two charity gigs at the Ancienne Belgique, Brussels on 17 October and at the Bataclan, Paris on 18 October, to benefit the group's long-standing collaborator Michael Shamberg. Chapman was invited by the remaining group members to replace former bassist Peter Hook for the two dates. Following these two concerts, the band received tour offers from across the world; and Chapman joined as they proceeded to tour extensively from 2011 to 2013.

After viewing footage of New Order playing on tour in Australia just after Chapman had joined, founding bassist Peter Hook claimed that, rather than playing live on stage, Chapman was actually miming along to bass parts Hook himself had written and recorded for the band. Hook described it as "the Milli Vanilli of bass." The band denied Hook's claims, saying that Chapman played live on stage—just as Hook had—while accompanying his own additional pre-recorded bass part.

In January 2014, New Order announced that they would perform live at the 24th Annual Tibet House US Benefit Concert on 11 March. The band revealed (via their official Facebook page) that the set would be performed by just three members of the band: Chapman, singer Bernard Sumner, and guitarist Phil Cunningham. The trio would return in 2017, with a show with Iggy Pop, and once again in February 2019 where they played alongside Lenny Kaye.

In 2013, the band commenced recording sessions on new material, including Chapman on co-writing duties. The product of these sessions was New Order's 10th album, Music Complete, which was released on 25 September 2015. The lineup has also had gigs since the release of the album, such as a concert in aid of the Teenage Cancer Trust at the Royal Albert Hall in London, 4 nights at the Vivid Festival, held at the Sydney Opera House, both in 2016, the MiF festival in Manchester in 2017, which saw the band perform with a 12 piece synthesizer orchestra, Alexandra Palace in 2018, headlining the BlueDot festival at Jodrell Bank in 2019 and a 4 night residency at the Jackie Gleason theatre at the Fillmore in Miami in January 2020.

The band return to live action in September 2021, when they played at the Piece Hall in Halifax. This was followed by a homecoming gig at Heaton Park in Manchester. In November, New Order performed at the MITS Award in London and also playing a headline show at The O2 Arena in London. In 2022, the band undertook the thirteen-show "Unity Tour" across North America, alongside electro-pop duo, Pet Shop Boys.

== Rubberbear ==
Since 2013, Chapman has also been working with Steve Trafford (ex The Fall) as a duo called Rubberbear. The band has released three EPs and have performed several live gigs throughout the UK including headlining the Bankswood Festival in August 2015. The music video for their debut single "Let's Move Somewhere Else" features the critically acclaimed actress Maxine Peake. In July 2014 the band announced they had signed a deal with Republic of Music, and their EP Other Side of the Fence was released on the label on 14 September 2014.

== ShadowParty ==
In 2014, Tom Chapman met Josh Hager, guitarist and keyboardist for Devo, in Boston, Massachusetts, and the foundations for a new group called ShadowParty were laid. Chapman's New Order bandmate, Phil Cunningham, and Hager's Devo bandmate, Jeff Friedl, joined to complete the lineup. Work began on the writing and recording of their eponymous debut album, which included collaborations from Manchester born singer, and former Primal Scream collaborator, Denise Johnson, Black Submarine and The Verve guitarist Nick McCabe, Jack Mitchell and Iwan Gronow, drummer and bass player for Johnny Marr. The Mute label released the album in July 2018. The band appeared at several festivals beforehand, the North By Northwich Festival, hosted by The Charlatans, The Great Escape Festival in Brighton and The Dot To Dot Festival in Manchester, Bristol and Nottingham. ShadowParty also featured at the Festival No.6 in Portmeirion, Wales, before they embarked on their debut headlining tour of the UK in September 2018. The band toured Italy in January 2019, and also supported The Slow Readers Club in March 2019 on their successful UK tour. In May 2019, the band headlined in Glasgow, as well as supporting A Certain Ratio in Manchester.

== Sea Fever (band) ==
Chapman become one of the founding members of Sea Fever in 2020, a collaboration between Iwan Gronow, best known as the bass player for Haven and Johnny Marr, Beth Cassidy of Section 25, Chapman's New Order bandmate, Phil Cunningham and drummer, Elliot Barlow. The band debuted their single, 'Crossed Wires' (a song featuring New Order drummer, Stephen Morris) in October 2020 and the song has also been featured on the Chris Hawkins BBC 6 Music morning radio show. Their debut album, 'Folding Lines', was released on 22 October 2021, and the band played a successful album release show at the Night & Day Cafe in Manchester on the same day. Further singles, 'De Facto', 'Under Duress', 'Folding Lines' and 'Afterthought' were also released in 2021. 2022 saw live performances by the band in Manchester and Hebden Bridge. There were also live festival appearances at Bluedot and Kendal Calling. The band will also be playing at Shiiine On Weekender Festival in November as well as headline gigs in Manchester, Cardiff and London.

== Discography ==
=== Tribeca ===
- What Are You Waiting 4 EP (2002)
- Better Than the Real Thing (featuring Jez Kerr) (2003)

=== Ithaca ===
- New Puppet Motion EP (2002)
- You Change Everything EP (2003)

=== Starless and Bibleblack ===
- Self Titled (2006)

=== Paul Heaton ===
- The Cross Eyed Rambler (2008)

=== Bad Lieutenant ===
- Never Cry Another Tear (2009)
- "In The Ghetto" (cover) (2010)

=== New Order ===
- Live at the London Troxy (2011)
- Live at Bestival 2012 (2012)
- Music Complete (2015)
- Complete Music (2016)
- NOMC15 (2017)
- Σ(No,12k,Lg,17Mif) New Order + Liam Gillick: So it goes.. (Live at MIF) (2019)
- Be A Rebel single (2020)

=== Rubberbear ===
- Let's Move Somewhere Else EP (2013)
- Elements EP (2014)
- Other Side of the Fence EP (2014)

=== Jake Evans ===
- Day One (2015)

=== ShadowParty ===
- ShadowParty (2018)
- After Party E.P (2018)
- The Town Hall Sessions E.P (2019)

=== Sea Fever ===
- Folding Lines (album) (2021)
- Crossed Wires (single) (2021)
- De Facto (single) (2021)
- Folding Lines (single) (2021)
- Under Duress (single) (2021)
- Afterthought (single) (2021)
- Beleaguered Land (single) (2022)
- Surface Sound (album) (2025)

== Instruments played ==
Chapman uses Fender Basses and a Music Man StingRay for live performances. Whilst recording with New Order in 2013 and 2014, Chapman used a Fender Precision Bass. He also plays keyboards and guitar. Chapman is also an endorsed artist for the Fender brand.
