= Phil Cunningham (rock musician) =

English guitarist (born 1974)

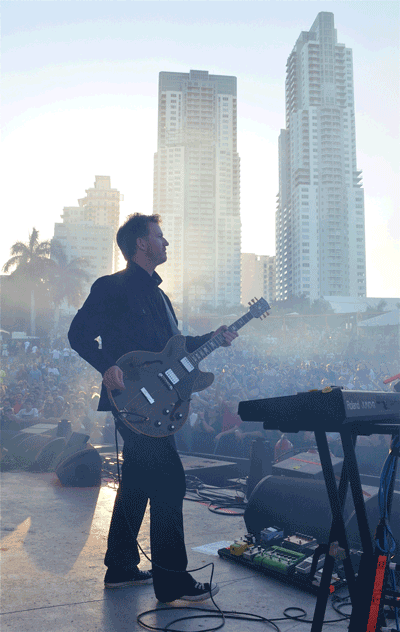
- Cunningham in Miami (March 2012)

Background information
- Born: Philip Cunningham; 7 December 1974 (age 51); Macclesfield, Cheshire, England
- Genres: Synthpop; alternative rock; new wave; electronic; britpop
- Instruments: Guitar; keyboards; synthesizers; drums

Philip Cunningham (born 7 December 1974) is an English guitarist who is a member of the bands Marion, New Order, Bad Lieutenant, ShadowParty and, more recently in 2020, Sea Fever.

== Early life and Marion ==
Cunningham was born in Macclesfield, England. He first gained prominence in the early 1990s as a founding member of the Britpop group Marion.

Cunningham formed Marion in Macclesfield in 1993 and played several small shows at venues in the local area. Marion found success with their debut album This World and Body, for which Cunningham has writing credit, peaking in the top 10 of the UK album charts. The band separated in 1999 after a major US tour for their second album The Program due to the lead singer's struggle with addiction.

In 2006 Marion reunited releasing the EP Live In The Studio Sessions and performing several live shows. The band disbanded again in 2008 due to issues with the lead singer's health.

Marion reunited again in 2011 with Jack Mitchell (formerly of Haven) replacing Murad Mousa on drums. The band released a recorded version of their comeback gig as the album Alive in Manchester in April 2012 and embarked on a UK tour.

== New Order ==
Cunningham first joined New Order in 2001 as a touring musician replacing Gillian Gilbert, who had stepped back from live commitments to care for her children, during the tour for the album Get Ready. During this period as a touring musician, New Order played shows in Europe, Japan and the United States.

Cunningham became a full member of New Order in the lead up to the 2005 album Waiting for the Sirens' Call where he made his recording and co-writing debut with the band. He has continued to co-write and record on all of New Order's releases including 2015's Music Complete, which featured the debut of new bassist Tom Chapman.

After New Order's hiatus, Cunningham continued to play live shows with the band appearing alongside the returning Gilbert in their 2011 reunion concert and Iggy Pop, Patti Smith and Philip Glass at the annual Tibet House Benefit Concert at Carnegie Hall in New York in 2014. On 18 July 2021, New Order celebrated Cunningham's 20th anniversary with the band.

== Bad Lieutenant ==
During New Order's hiatus, Cunningham joined Bernard Sumner, Stephen Morris and Alex James (of Blur) to form Bad Lieutenant helping to write the band's debut album Never Cry Another Tear. The band also featured former Marion members Jack Mitchell and Jake Evans.

== ShadowParty ==
In 2014, Cunningham formed ShadowParty alongside fellow New Order member Tom Chapman and Josh Hager and Jeff Friedl of Devo.

The band released their self-titled debut album ShadowParty in 2018 on the Mute Records label. The album featured several collaborations including Manchester singer, Denise Johnson, known for her work with Primal Scream, Nick McCabe, from The Verve and Black Submarine, former Marion and Haven drummer Jack Mitchell, former Haven bassist Iwan Gronow, American DJ Whitney Fierce and, English composer Joe Duddell.

Following the release of their debut album the band played several festivals including Festival No. 6 in Wales, North By Northwich, The Great Escape Festival in Brighton and the Dot To Dot Festival. The band toured the UK in September 2018 before touring Italy in January 2019.

The band also supported The Slow Readers Club on their 2019 UK tour and A Certain Ratio in Manchester in May 2019.

== Sea Fever ==
In 2020, Cunningham founded Sea Fever alongside Iwan Gronow, Beth Cassidy of Section 25, Tom Chapman and, Elliot Barlow.

The band debuted their single Crossed Wire, which featured New Order drummer Stephen Morris, in 2020. Their debut album, Folding Lines, was released on 22 October 2021 with the band playing an album release show at the Night & Day Cafe in Manchester on the same day. Further singles, "De Facto", "Under Duress", "Folding Lines" and "Afterthought" were also released in 2021.

The band played several festivals in 2021 including Bluedot, Kendal Calling and, Shiiine On Weekender Festival as well as number of live shows.

== Discography ==
=== With Marion ===
- This World and Body (1996)
- The Program (1998)
- Alive in Manchester (2012)

=== With New Order ===
- Waiting for the Sirens' Call (2005)
- Live at the London Troxy (2011)
- Live at Bestival 2012 (2013)
- Lost Sirens (2013)
- Music Complete (2015)
- Complete Music (2016)
- NOMC15 (2017)
- Σ(No,12k,Lg,17Mif) New Order + Liam Gillick: So It Goes.. (Live at MIF) (2019)
- "Be a Rebel" (single) (2020)

=== With Bad Lieutenant ===
- Never Cry Another Tear (2009)

=== With ShadowParty ===
- ShadowParty (2018)
- After Party E.P (2018)
- The Town Hall Sessions E.P (2019)

=== With Sea Fever ===
- Folding Lines (album) (2021)
- "Crossed Wires" (single) (2021)
- "De Facto" (single) (2021)
- "Folding Lines" (single) (2021)
- "Under Duress" (single) (2021)
- "Afterthought" (single) (2021)
- "Beleaguered Land" (single) (2022)
