= Music Complete =

Studio album by New Order
- Released: 25 September 2015
- Recorded: 2014–2015
- Studios: 80 Hertz, Manchester
- Genres: Dance-rock; electropop
- Length: 64:26
- Label: Mute
- Producers: New Order; Stuart Price; Tom Rowlands

New Order chronology
| Lost Sirens (2013) | Music Complete (2015) | Complete Music (2016) |

Singles from Music Complete
- 1. "Restless" Released: 29 July 2015; 2. "Tutti Frutti" Released: 19 October 2015; 3. "Singularity" Released: 18 March 2016; 4. "People on the High Line" Released: 29 July 2016

Music Complete is the tenth studio album by English rock band New Order. It was released on 25 September 2015 by Mute Records, their debut on the label. The album features guest vocals from Elly Jackson of La Roux, Iggy Pop, and Brandon Flowers of The Killers. This is the band's first album with new bassist Tom Chapman, replacing the original bassist Peter Hook, and the first time to featured as a five-piece band, as original keyboardist and guitarist Gillian Gilbert returned to the band and Phil Cunningham, who initially replaced Gilbert remained in the band. As of 2026, this is the band's most recent album.

== Background ==
Music Complete marks a return to a more electronic direction compared to New Order's previous two albums, which had been more guitar-based. This is the first album without former bassist Peter Hook, as well as the recorded debut of Tom Chapman and the return of Gillian Gilbert, who had taken leave from the band in 2001, but toured with them from 2011 onwards. Guest backing vocals are provided by Denise Johnson and Dawn Zee, who have performed with the band on their last three albums.

In March and July 2014, the band revealed their first new songs on tour at Lollapalooza Chile and in the United States: "Plastic" and "Singularity".

On 2 and 4 September 2014, Billboard, along with Stereogum and Consequence of Sound reported that New Order had signed on to Mute Records and that future releases were expected, at the time planned to be EPs which would then be "probably put together as an album." Billboard also announced Bernard Sumner's autobiography, Chapter and Verse, which was released on 24 September of the same year.

On 22 June, the official New Order site announced the release date and title of the album, Music Complete. The website also provided terms of distribution: CD, digital download, and limited edition clear vinyl, along with an exclusive 8-piece deluxe vinyl collection that includes the album plus extended versions of all 11 tracks on coloured vinyl.

On 22 June, 30 June, and 7 July, the official New Order YouTube channel uploaded three separate teasers that included snippets of music from the album.

On 29 July, "Restless" was released as the first single for the album. On 19 October, "Tutti Frutti" was released as the album's second single. A third single, "Singularity", was released 18 March 2016. "People on the High Line" was released as the fourth single on 29 July 2016, announced with a fan music video competition.

== Promotion ==
=== Packaging ===
The artwork for Music Complete was created by New Order's long-time art director and collaborator Peter Saville. The artwork features a montage of lines with the colours red, yellow, green and blue. Depending on the type of format, the colour schemes vary. For the CD, the pattern clockwise from top right is yellow, red, blue and green. The LPs are red, yellow, green and blue. Digital downloads are the regular format; blue, green, red and yellow. The deluxe edition's artwork is the same as the album, but all six coloured vinyl sleeves are different styles, and have no colour. The six coloured vinyl range from red to purple.

=== Release ===
Music Complete was released on 25 September in five different formats: CD, regular and limited-edition double-clear LP, digital download, and an 8-piece deluxe vinyl box set. All CD and LP orders come with MP3 and audio downloads of the album. The deluxe box set includes the clear double LP, along with extended versions of all 11 tracks on six different coloured vinyl (the 9 tracks of extended version later re-released as Complete Music in 2016). The box set was released on 6 November 2015. A limited edition re-release was issued for Love Record Stores day, 20 June 2020. The double vinyl LP was pressed in orange vinyl and issued in a gatefold sleeve. The release included a 12-page booklet.

== Reception ==
Professional ratings
Aggregate scores
| Source | Rating |
|---|---|
| AnyDecentMusic? | 7.6/10 |
| Metacritic | 76/100 |
Review scores
| Source | Rating |
| AllMusic | 3/5 stars |
| The A.V. Club | B |
| The Guardian | 4/5 stars |
| Mixmag | 8/10 |
| Mojo | 4/5 stars |
| The Observer | 4/5 stars |
| Pitchfork | 7.2/10 |
| Q | 4/5 stars |
| Rolling Stone | 3.5/5 stars |
| Uncut | 7/10 |

Music Complete received highly positive reviews from critics. On Metacritic, the album has a weighted average score of 76 out of 100 based on 21 reviews, which indicates "generally favorable reviews". Mixmag's S. Worthy described the record as "an album of outstanding pop, shuddering dance-rock and intricate electronic moods. Barry Walters of Rolling Stone wrote: "Just as Curtis' suicide inspired his bandmates to reinvent themselves as New Order in 1980, Hook's departure frees them to create their most varied and substantial work in decades." Michael Roffman of Consequence of Sound called Music Complete "the rare late era LP that blossoms with life, while also echoing the past", while Tim Jonze of The Guardian wrote that the album "feels like the freshest thing they've done in ages."

Pitchfork critic T. Cole Rachel called it their most refined album since Technique, and remarked that Music Complete sounds like "classic New Order" and that the album "certainly doesn’t do anything to diminish New Order’s formidable legacy, but it doesn’t necessarily expand upon it either." Stephen Dalton of Uncut felt that it "drags and trundles in places", but is "easily New Order's best album since Technique, and probably their most musically diverse ever." In a less favourable review, Tim Sendra of AllMusic called it "a watered-down and uninspired album by a band that lost the plot long ago and can now only capture an occasional glimmer of what made it so great in the first place." Concluding a less favourable 1 of 5 star review, Truck & Driver wrote: "...full of soggy, uninspired self-indulgent material that sounds like a mish-mash of 80s B-sides. Save your money."

=== Accolades ===
Accolades for Music Complete
| Publication | Accolade | Year | Rank |
|---|---|---|---|
| The Guardian | The Best Albums of 2015 | 2015 | 22 |
| NME | NME's Albums of the Year 2015 | 2015 | 48 |

== Track listing ==
All tracks are written by New Order, except where noted.

Music Complete track listing
| No. | Title | Writer(s) | Length |
|---|---|---|---|
| 1. | "Restless" | | 5:28 |
| 2. | "Singularity" | New Order; Tom Rowlands | 5:37 |
| 3. | "Plastic" | | 6:55 |
| 4. | "Tutti Frutti" (featuring Elly Jackson) | | 6:22 |
| 5. | "People on the High Line" (featuring Elly Jackson) | | 5:41 |
| 6. | "Stray Dog" (featuring Iggy Pop) | | 6:17 |
| 7. | "Academic" | | 5:54 |
| 8. | "Nothing but a Fool" | | 7:43 |
| 9. | "Unlearn This Hatred" | New Order; Rowlands | 4:19 |
| 10. | "The Game" | | 5:06 |
| 11. | "Superheated" (featuring Brandon Flowers) | New Order; Brandon Flowers | 5:04 |
| Total length: | | | 64:26 |

12-inch vinyl box set including digital download (Music Complete Extended Mixes)
| No. | Title | Writer(s) | Length |
|---|---|---|---|
| 1. | "Restless" (extended mix) | | 9:30 |
| 2. | "Singularity" (extended mix) | New Order; Rowlands | 7:34 |
| 3. | "Plastic" (extended mix) | | 9:07 |
| 4. | "Tutti Frutti" (extended mix; featuring Elly Jackson) | | 8:05 |
| 5. | "People on the High Line" (extended mix; featuring Elly Jackson) | | 7:52 |
| 6. | "Stray Dog" (extended mix; featuring Iggy Pop) | | 6:31 |
| 7. | "Academic" (extended mix) | | 8:57 |
| 8. | "Nothing but a Fool" (extended mix) | | 9:32 |
| 9. | "Unlearn This Hatred" (extended mix) | New Order; Rowlands | 5:26 |
| 10. | "The Game" (extended mix) | | 7:25 |
| 11. | "Superheated" (extended mix; featuring Brandon Flowers) | New Order; Flowers | 7:39 |
| Total length: | | | 87:38 |

== Tour ==
The band embarked on an initial tour in support of Music Complete from 4 November 2015 to 20 December 2015, with tour dates held across Europe and the UK plus stops at the Clockenflap festival in Hong Kong and the Day for Night Festival in the United States. Future tour plans include the 2016 Sónar Festival in Barcelona.

== Personnel ==
=== New Order ===
Musician credits for New Order are not listed in the liner notes of the album's personnel. Below are the instruments that the group typically plays.

- Bernard Sumner – vocals, guitar, keyboards, synthesisers
- Stephen Morris – drums and percussion, keyboards, synthesisers, drum programming
- Gillian Gilbert – keyboards, synthesisers
- Phil Cunningham – guitars, keyboards, synthesisers, electronic percussion
- Tom Chapman – bass, backing vocals, keyboards, synthesisers

=== Production ===
The liner notes list the album's personnel as follows:

- New Order – producer (tracks 1, 3–8, 10, 11)
- Daniel Miller – executive producer
- Tom Rowlands – producer (tracks 2, 9)
- Stuart Price – additional production (track 11)
- Danny Davies – engineering, pre-production
- Jim Spencer – additional engineering (Eve Studios, Stockport)
- Rafael Pereira – additional engineering (Elite Music studios, Miami)
- Robert Root – additional engineering (Battle Born studios, Las Vegas)
- Steve Dub – additional engineering (Rowlands Audio Research)
- Craig Silvey – mixing (Toast studios, London) (tracks 1, 2, 4–10)
- Eduardo de la Paz – mixing assistant (Toast studios, London) (tracks 1, 2, 4–10)
- Richard X and Pete Hofmann – mixing (track 3)
- Iggy Pop – vocals (track 6)
- Brandon Flowers – vocals, mixing (track 11)
- La Roux – vocals (tracks 4, 5), backing vocals (track 3)
- Dawn Zee – backing vocals (tracks 3, 8)
- Denise Johnson – backing vocals (tracks 3, 8)
- Giacomo Cavagna – Italian spoken vocal (track 4)

=== Strings ===
- Joe Duddell – string arrangements, conductor (Manchester Camerata Strings) (1, 4, 5, 8, 10)
- Katie Stillman – violin
- Paula Smart – violin
- Karen Mainwaring – violin
- Simmy Singh – violin
- Sophie Mather – violin
- Gemma Bass – violin
- Anthony Banks – violin
- Sian Goodwin – violin
- Rachel Jones – viola
- Jordan Bowron – viola
- Nathaniel Boyd – cello
- Barbara Grunthal – cello
- Daniel Storer – double bass
- Strings recorded at 80 Hertz Studios, The Sharp Project, Manchester
- George Atkins – engineer (strings)

=== Technical ===
- Frank Arkwright – mastering (Abbey Road Studios)
- Peter Saville – art direction
- Paul Hetherington – design

== Charts ==
Chart performance for Music Complete
| Chart (2015) | Peak position |
|---|---|
| Australian Albums (ARIA) | 20 |
| Austrian Albums (Ö3 Austria) | 26 |
| Belgian Albums (Ultratop Flanders) | 22 |
| Belgian Albums (Ultratop Wallonia) | 11 |
| Croatian Albums (HDU) | 36 |
| Czech Albums (ČNS IFPI) | 23 |
| Danish Albums (Hitlisten) | 26 |
| Dutch Albums (Album Top 100) | 10 |
| Finnish Albums (Suomen virallinen lista) | 39 |
| French Albums (SNEP) | 17 |
| German Albums (Offizielle Top 100) | 14 |
| Irish Albums (IRMA) | 6 |
| Irish Independent Albums (IRMA) | 2 |
| Italian Albums (FIMI) | 58 |
| Japanese Albums (Oricon) | 10 |
| New Zealand Albums (RMNZ) | 37 |
| Norwegian Albums (VG-lista) | 24 |
| Portuguese Albums (AFP) | 30 |
| Scottish Albums (Official Charts) | 2 |
| Spanish Albums (Promusicae) | 17 |
| Swedish Albums (Sverigetopplistan) | 14 |
| Swiss Albums (Schweizer Hitparade) | 19 |
| UK Albums (Official Charts) | 2 |
| UK Independent Albums (Official Charts) | 1 |
| US Billboard 200 | 34 |
| US Independent Albums (Billboard) | 5 |
| US Top Alternative Albums (Billboard) | 7 |
| US Top Rock Albums (Billboard) | 8 |

== Certifications ==
Certifications for Music Complete
| Region | Certification | Certified units/sales |
|---|---|---|
| United Kingdom (BPI) | Silver | 76,708 |
