= Plastic (New Order song) =

Promotional single by New Order

from the album Music Complete
- Released: 16 September 2015
- Genre: Dance-pop; electropop
- Length: 6:56
- Label: Mute
- Songwriter: New Order
- Producer: New Order

New Order singles chronology
"Restless" (2015)	"Plastic" (2015)	"Tutti Frutti" (2015)

"Plastic" is the thirty-third single by English rock band New Order. It was released digitally on 16 September 2015 as an advanced download from their tenth studio album, Music Complete. A physical release of the single or additional remixes have not been released. The song itself debuted as new material at the Chicago Aragon Ballroom on July 1, 2014. The song is the second released from the album, itself, and deals with a man who is in a struggling relationship with a woman. La Roux's Elly Jackson provides backing vocals. The song received critical acclaim, with many critics praising the song as their best song in decades.

== Music video ==
There is no official music video. However, there is an official audio on the band's YouTube account, uploaded on the same date as the song was released.

== Reception ==
The song received more praise than New Order's first single from Music Complete, "Restless". It has garnered critical acclaim, with some claiming that the song itself was their greatest hit in decades. Consequence of Sound stated that the song itself was "so addicting". Rolling Stone said that the single was "entrancing" and how it "communicated through New Order's distinctive style."

== Track listing ==
No.	Title	Length
1.	"Plastic" (featuring Elly Jackson)	6:56
