= Spooky (New Order song) =

1993 single by New Order

Single by New Order

from the album Republic
- Released: 6 December 1993
- Recorded: 1992
- Genre: Alternative dance
- Length: 4:43
- Label: CentreDate Co. Ltd/London
- Songwriters: Bernard Sumner; Peter Hook; Stephen Morris; Gillian Gilbert; Stephen Hague
- Producers: New Order; Stephen Hague

New Order singles chronology
"World (The Price of Love)" (1993)	"Spooky" (1993)	"True Faith-94" (1994)

"Spooky" is a song by English rock band New Order. It was released in December 1993 by CentreDate Co. Ltd/London as the fourth and final single from their sixth studio album, Republic (1993). The song would be their last single proper until 2001's "Crystal".

CD one featured remixes by Fluke, while CD two featured remixes by Paul van Dyk and Tony Garcia. Several different versions exist, notably the Singles (2005) album featured a different edit of "Spooky", which had not previously been available in the UK. The promo video used the Fluke version. The 2016 re-release of Singles, which corrected many of the errors featured on the 2005 release, includes the Fluke Minimix.

Apart from its appearance on the Singles album, "Spooky" is rarely included on New Order compilations; notably, it was not featured on 1994's best-of or the expansive Retro box set.

== Track listing ==
All tracks are written by Gillian Gilbert, Stephen Hague, Peter Hook, Stephen Morris and Bernard Sumner.

CD #1: NUOCD 4 / Cassette: NUOMC 4 (UK & Europe)
No.	Title	Length
1.	"Spooky" (Minimix) (Remixed by Fluke)	3:51
2.	"Spooky" (Magimix) (Remixed by Fluke)	6:56
3.	"Spooky" (Moulimix) (Remixed by Fluke)	5:49
4.	"Spooky" (album version)	4:44

CD #2: NUOCDP 4 (UK & Europe)
No.	Title	Length
1.	"Spooky" (Out of Order Mix) (Remixed by Paul van Dyk)	6:19
2.	"Spooky" (Stadium Mix) (Remixed by Tony Garcia)	6:31
3.	"Spooky" (New Order in Heaven) (Remixed by Paul van Dyk)	6:10
4.	"Spooky" (Boo! Dub Mix) (Remixed by Tony Garcia)	4:56
5.	"Spooky" (Stadium Instrumental) (Remixed by Tony Garcia)	6:32

12": NUOX 4 (UK & Europe)
No.	Title	Length
1.	"Spooky" (Magimix) (Remixed by Fluke)	6:56
2.	"Spooky" (Moulimix) (Remixed by Fluke)	5:49
3.	"Spooky" (album version)	4:44

CD: 9 41313-2 (US)
No.	Title	Length
1.	"Spooky" (radio edit)	3:45
2.	"Spooky" (Stadium Mix) (Remixed by Tony Garcia)	6:31
3.	"Spooky" (Magimix) (Remixed by Fluke)	6:57
4.	"Spooky" (Out of Order Mix) (Remixed by Paul Van Dyk)	4:56
5.	"Spooky" (Night Tripper Mix) (Remixed by Tony Garcia)	7:03
6.	"Spooky" (Moulimix) (Remixed by Fluke)	5:47
7.	"Spooky" (New Order in Heaven Mix) (Remixed by Paul Van Dyk)	6:11
8.	"Spooky" (Boo! Dub Mix) (Remixed by Tony Garcia)	4:56

== Chart positions ==
Chart (1993–94)	Peak position
UK Singles (OCC)	22
UK Airplay (Music Week)	33
US Hot Dance Music/Club Play (Billboard)	6
US Hot Dance Singles Sales (Billboard)	36
