= World (The Price of Love) =

1993 single by New Order

Single by New Order

from the album Republic
- Released: 23 August 1993
- Length: 3:38
- Label: London
- Songwriters: Bernard Sumner; Peter Hook; Stephen Morris; Gillian Gilbert
- Producers: New Order; Stephen Hague

New Order singles chronology
"Ruined in a Day" (1993)	"World (The Price of Love)" (1993)	"Spooky" (1993)

Music video
- "World (The Price of Love)" on YouTube

"World (The Price of Love)" is a song by English band New Order, released in August 1993 by London Records as the third single from their sixth studio album, Republic (1993). Simply listed as "World" on the album, the subtitle "The Price of Love" was added for the single release, as it is repeated during the chorus. A 7:34 dance remix of the track by Paul Oakenfold, called the "Perfecto mix", was included on many releases of the single and was used for an alternate edit of the video.

== Music video ==
The music video was originally shot in April 1993. It was used for both the original version and an edit of the Perfecto remix of the song. Directed by Baillie Walsh and shot in Cannes with only 4 long steadicam shots, the video features the camera slowly journeying from the pier of the beach club of the exclusive luxury Carlton Hotel into the hotel itself, lingering on the faces of hotel guests.

It features the band only fleetingly – Peter Hook sits at a table on the beach club restaurant, Bernard Sumner stands overlooking the sea, and Stephen Morris and Gillian Gilbert pose for a photograph outside the Carlton Hotel; the photographer on the esplanade striking the 'Elvis' pose is percussionist David Armstrong, who was a session musician on the 'Republic' album. This would be the last time the band would appear in a video until 2005's "Jetstream".

== Track listings ==
All tracks are written by Gillian Gilbert, Stephen Hague, Peter Hook, Stephen Morris and Bernard Sumner.

CD 1: NUOCD 3 (UK and Europe)
No.	Title	Length
1.	"World" (Perfecto edit) (remixed by Paul Oakenfold and Steve Osborne)	4:02
2.	"World" (radio edit)	3:39
3.	"World" (Perfecto mix) (remixed by Paul Oakenfold and Steve Osborne)	7:33
4.	"World" (Sexy Disco dub) (remixed by Paul Oakenfold and Steve Osborne)	5:56

CD 2: NUCDP 3 (UK and Europe)
No.	Title	Length
1.	"World" (Brothers in Rhythm mix) (remixed by Brothers in Rhythm)	8:03
2.	"World" (Brothers Dubstrumental) (remixed by Brothers in Rhythm)	5:39
3.	"World" (World in Action mix) (remixed by K-Klass)	5:51
4.	"World" (Pharmacy dub) (remixed by K-Klass)	7:06

7-inch single: 857240.7 (Europe); cassette: NUOMC 3 (UK and Europe)
No.	Title	Length
1.	"World" (radio edit)	3:39
2.	"World" (Perfecto edit) (remixed by Paul Oakenfold and Steve Osborne)	4:02

12-inch single: NUOX 3 (UK and Europe)
No.	Title	Length
1.	"World" (Perfecto mix) (remixed by Paul Oakenfold and Steve Osborne)	7:33
2.	"World" (Sexy Disco dub) (remixed by Paul Oakenfold and Steve Osborne)	5:56
3.	"World" (Brothers in Rhythm mix) (remixed by Brothers in Rhythm)	8:03
4.	"World" (World in Action mix) (remixed by K-Klass)	5:51

== Charts ==
=== Weekly charts ===
Chart (1993)	Peak position
Australia (ARIA)	87
Canada Top Singles (RPM)	49
Canada Dance/Urban (RPM)	7
Europe (Eurochart Hot 100)	45
Europe (European Hit Radio)	23
Germany (GfK)	77
Ireland (IRMA)	27
UK Singles (Official Charts)	13
UK Airplay (Music Week)	8
US Billboard Hot 100	92
US Alternative Airplay (Billboard)	5
US Dance Club Songs (Billboard)	1
US Dance Singles Sales (Billboard)	26

=== Year-end charts ===
Chart (1993)	Position
US Dance Club Play (Billboard)	39
