= Ruined in a Day =

1993 single by New Order

Single by New Order

from the album Republic
- B-side: "Vicious Circle"
- Released: 21 June 1993
- Length: 3:57
- Label: London
- Songwriter(s): Bernard Sumner; Peter Hook; Stephen Morris; Gillian Gilbert
- Producer(s): New Order; Stephen Hague

New Order singles chronology
"Regret" (1993)	"Ruined in a Day" (1993)	"World (The Price of Love)" (1993)

"Ruined in a Day" is a song by English rock group New Order. It was released on 21 June 1993 by London Records as the second single from their sixth studio album, Republic (1993). The song also appeared on the group's Best of compilation the following year and on the 2005 chronology Singles.

== Music video ==
The music video for the track depicts the band and their long-standing collaborator Keith Allen immersed in a game of charades for Hollywood Blockbusters, with a group of Buddhist monks. Allen also directed the film.

== Track listing ==
All tracks are written by Gillian Gilbert, Stephen Hague, Peter Hook, Stephen Morris and Bernard Sumner; except where indicated

CD No. 1: NUOCD 2 (UK and Europe)
No.	Title	Writer(s)	Length
1.	"Ruined in a Day" (radio edit)		3:58
2.	"Ruined in a Day" (Ambient Mix) (Remixed by Booga Bear)		5:44
3.	"Ruined in a Day" (Reunited in a Day Remix) (Remixed by K-Klass)		6:14
4.	"Vicious Circle" (Mike Haas Mix) (Remixed by Mike Haas)	Gilbert, Hook, Morris, Sumner	3:23

CD No. 2: NUOCDP 2 (UK and Europe) – The Limited Edition
No.	Title	Length
1.	"Ruined in a Day" (Sly and Robbie Radio Edit)	4:30
2.	"Ruined in a Day" (12-inch Bogle Mix)	4:30
3.	"Ruined in a Day" (Dance Hall Groove)	5:26
4.	"Ruined in a Day" (Rhythm Twins Dub)	4:30
5.	"Ruined in a Day" (live mix)	4:30

- All CD No. 2 tracks remixed by Sly and Robbie and Handel Tucker

12-inch: NUOX 2 (UK and Europe)
No.	Title	Length
1.	"Ruined in a Day" (12-inch Bogle Mix) (Remixed by Sly and Robbie and Handel Tucker)	4:30
2.	"Ruined in a Day" (live mix) (Remixed by Sly and Robbie and Handel Tucker)	4:30
3.	"World (The Price of Dub)" (Remixed by Brothers in Rhythm)	6:48
4.	"Ruined in a Day" (Reunited in a Day Remix) (Remixed by K-Klass)	6:14

Cassette: NUOMC 2 (UK and Europe)
No.	Title	Writer(s)	Length
1.	"Ruined in a Day" (radio edit)		3:58
2.	"Vicious Circle" (New Order Mix) (Remixed by Mike Haas)	Gilbert, Hook, Morris, Sumner	4:09
3.	"Ruined in a Day" (12-inch Bogle Mix) (Remixed by Sly and Robbie and Handel Tucker)		4:30
4.	"Ruined in a Day" (live mix) (Remixed by Sly and Robbie and Handel Tucker)		4:30

== Charts ==
Chart (1993–1994)	Peak position
Australia (ARIA)	182
Europe (Eurochart Hot 100)	38
UK Singles (OCC)	22
UK Airplay (Music Week)	12
US Alternative Airplay (Billboard)	30

== Release history ==
Region	Date	Format(s)	Label(s)	Ref.
United Kingdom	21 June 1993	12-inch vinyl; CD; cassette	London	
Australia	24 January 1994	CD; cassette	London; Polydor	
