= Original Signal Recordings =

Defunct American independent record label

- Founded: 2007
- Founder: Daniel Klaus, Lucas Mann
- Defunct: 2010
- Status: Defunct
- Distributor: Universal Motown Republic Group
- Country of origin: U.S.
- Location: New York City

Original Signal Recordings was an American independent record label based in New York City. Original Signal was owned and operated by Music Nation, distributed by Universal Motown Republic Group, and was a member of the American Association of Independent Music. Original Signal was founded in 2007 by CEO Daniel Klaus and President Lucas Mann. Mann was named to Billboard magazine's fourth annual "30 Under 30" Power Players list.

Original Signal participated in full-service record deals with Athlete, The Bronx, David Ford, Kill Hannah, Longwave, The Modern Society, The Sounds, Lane Turner, and Butch Walker. Original Signal acted as the distribution and marketing arm for Ingrid Michaelson and her Cabin 24 Records.

== Artists ==
- Athlete
- The Bronx
- David Ford
- Kill Hannah
- Bad Lieutenant
- Longwave
- Ingrid Michaelson
- The Modern Society
- The Sounds
- Lane Turner
- Blanche
- Butch Walker
- The Futurecast
- Lindsey Ray
- Vega4
