= Live in Glasgow (New Order video) =

Video by New Order
- Released: 2008
- Recorded: October 2006 at the O2 Academy Glasgow
- Length: 217 minutes
- Label: Warner Music Entertainment

New Order chronology
A Collection (2005)	Live in Glasgow (2008)

Live in Glasgow is a live DVD by English band New Order, which was released in 2008. It features 18 tracks, recorded in October 2006 at the O2 Academy Glasgow. A second disc is also included which features tracks recorded live from the early days called Rare and Unseen Footage.

Limited editions released by HMV (UK) included a bonus CD that compiles 12 songs from the Glasgow performance.

PopMatters rated it seven out of ten.

== Track listing ==
=== DVD one - Live in Glasgow ===
1. "Crystal"
2. "Turn"
3. "True Faith"
4. "Regret"
5. "Ceremony"
6. "Who's Joe"
7. "These Days"
8. "Krafty"
9. "Waiting for the Sirens' Call"
10. "Your Silent Face"
11. "Guilt Is a Useless Emotion"
12. "Bizarre Love Triangle"
13. "Temptation"
14. "The Perfect Kiss"
15. "Blue Monday"
16. "Transmission"
17. "Shadowplay"
18. "Love Will Tear Us Apart"

=== DVD two - Rare and Unseen Footage ===
Celebration 1981

1. "Ceremony"
2. "I.C.B."
3. "Chosen Time"

Glastonbury 1981

4. "Senses"
5. "Procession"
6. "The Him"

Rome 1982

7. "Ultraviolence"
8. "Hurt"

Cork 1983

9. "Leave Me Alone"
10. "Everything's Gone Green"

Rotterdam 1985

11. "Sunrise"
12. "As It Is When It Was"
13. "The Village"
14. "This Time of Night"

Toronto 1985

15. "We All Stand"
16. "Age of Consent"
17. "Temptation"

Shoreline 1989

18. "Dream Attack"
19. "1963"

Hyde Park Wireless 2005

20. "Run Wild"
21. "She's Lost Control"
