= Get Ready (New Order album) =

Studio album by New Order
- Released: 27 August 2001
- Recorded: 2000–2001
- Studio: Real World, Box, England; Sarm Hook End, London; Rockfield, Rockfield, Wales
- Genre: Alternative rock; electronic rock
- Length: 50:58
- Label: London (UK); Reprise (US)
- Producer: Steve Osborne; New Order; Flood; Bernard Sumner

New Order chronology
Republic (1993)	Get Ready (2001)	Waiting for the Sirens' Call (2005)

Singles from Get Ready
- 1. "Crystal" Released: 11 July 2001; 2. "60 Miles an Hour" Released: 19 November 2001; 3. "Someone Like You" Released: 6 December 2001

Get Ready is the seventh studio album by English rock band New Order. It was released on 27 August 2001 in the United Kingdom by London Records and on 16 October 2001 in the United States by Reprise Records. It was the band's first studio album in eight years, following 1993's Republic.

== Background ==
Peter Hook stated that the album's title "could mean anything or nothing. I thought it was just nice; New Order, Get Ready; 'cause we are, we're getting ready for the next phase of our musical lives both physically and mentally, so it's quite a simple thing but it's very pertinent."

The album was dedicated to Rob Gretton, the manager of Joy Division and New Order, who died in 1999.

== Reception ==
Professional ratings
Aggregate scores
Source	Rating
Metacritic	72/100
Review scores
Source	Rating
AllMusic	4/5 stars
Blender	3/5 stars
Entertainment Weekly	A−
The Guardian	4/5 stars
NME	8/10
Pitchfork	7.6/10
Q	4/5 stars
Rolling Stone	3.5/5 stars
The Rolling Stone Album Guide	3.5/5 stars
The Village Voice	A−

Get Ready received generally positive reviews from music critics. At Metacritic, which assigns a normalised rating out of 100 to reviews from mainstream publications, the album received an average score of 72, based on 24 reviews. David Browne of Entertainment Weekly opined that New Order have "never sounded stronger or more vigorous", calling Get Ready "a stunning and confident return to form". Robert Christgau of The Village Voice deemed it the band's best album "in 15 years", while AllMusic critic John Bush described the record as "their first work in 15 years that's focused on songwriting and performance rather than grafted dance techniques." In his review for Q, Andrew Harrison said that "New Order have made better records than this, but not many with such an emotional charge and the expansive noise to carry it off... [...] Get Ready is the sound of a great band breaking free of their past before your ears."

Village Voice writer Michaelangelo Matos criticised the compositions, saying, "Calling the album Get Ready feels as if they're psyching themselves up for the task at hand—like they're raring to go but aren't exactly certain where they're going, or even necessarily why they're doing it. The songs carry this out—it's them, not the sonics, that make this the second disappointing New Order album in a row." Mojo's David Peschek was unconvinced by the album, finding it to be "less a call to arms than the sound of an old man wheezing out of a creaky armchair."

By April 2006, Get Ready had sold 153,000 copies in the United States, according to Nielsen SoundScan.

=== Accolades ===
Q listed Get Ready as one of the best 50 albums of 2001. In The Village Voice's 2001 Pazz & Jop poll, Get Ready was voted by critics as the year's 22nd best album.

== Track listing ==
All tracks are written by New Order (Gillian Gilbert, Peter Hook, Stephen Morris and Bernard Sumner). All tracks are produced by Steve Osborne, except where noted.

Get Ready track listing
No.	Title	Producer(s)	Length
1.	"Crystal"		6:51
2.	"60 Miles an Hour"		4:34
3.	"Turn My Way" (featuring Billy Corgan)		5:05
4.	"Vicious Streak"		5:40
5.	"Primitive Notion"		5:43
6.	"Slow Jam"		4:53
7.	"Rock the Shack" (featuring Bobby Gillespie)	New Order; Flood^{[a]}	4:12
8.	"Someone Like You"		5:42
9.	"Close Range"		4:13
10.	"Run Wild"	Osborne; Bernard Sumner^{[a]}	3:57

Japanese edition bonus track
No.	Title	Producer(s)	Length
11.	"Behind Closed Doors"	Arthur Baker	5:27

Notes

- ^{^[a]} signifies an additional producer

== Personnel ==
=== Band members ===
- Bernard Sumner – vocals, guitars, keyboards, synths
- Peter Hook – bass
- Stephen Morris – drums, keyboards, synths
- Gillian Gilbert – keyboards, synths

=== Additional musicians ===
- Pete Davis – programming (tracks 1–6, 8–10)
- Simon Hale – string arrangements, conducting (track 10)
- Dawn Zee – backing vocals (tracks 1, 9, 10)
- Billy Corgan – special guest vocals (track 3)
- Bobby Gillespie – guest vocals (track 7)
- Andrew Innes – guitar (track 7)

=== Technical ===
- Steve Osborne – production (tracks 1–6, 8–10); mixing (tracks 2–6, 8, 10)
- New Order – production (track 7)
- Bruno Ellingham – engineering (tracks 1–6, 8–10); studio assistance at Rockfield
- Andrew Robinson – engineering (tracks 1–6, 8–10)
- Mark 'Spike' Stent – mixing (tracks 1, 9)
- Jan 'Stan' Kybert – engineering, Pro Tools (track 1); Pro Tools mix pre-production (track 9)
- Matt Fields – engineering assistance (track 1); Pro Tools mix pre-production assistance (track 9)
- David Treahearn – Pro Tools mix pre-production assistance (track 9)
- Adrian Bushby – mix engineering (tracks 2–6, 8, 10)
- Paul 'P-dub' Walton – mix engineering (track 9)
- Flood – additional production, mix (track 7)
- Rob Kirwan – engineering (tracks 7, 10)
- Owen Mulcahy – engineering assistance (track 7)
- Bernard Sumner – additional production, mix (track 10)
- Marco Migliari – studio assistance at Real World
- Tom Hannen – studio assistance at Sarm Hook End
- Tim Young – mastering at Metropolis Mastering

=== Artwork ===
- Peter Saville – cover art direction
- Jürgen Teller – photography
- Coco – thanks (cover model)
- Howard Wakefield – design
- Sam Roberts – design

== Charts ==
=== Weekly charts ===
Weekly chart performance for Get Ready
Chart (2001)	Peak position
Australian Albums (ARIA)	7
Austrian Albums (Ö3 Austria)	15
Belgian Albums (Ultratop Flanders)	45
Belgian Albums (Ultratop Wallonia)	15
Canadian Albums (Nielsen SoundScan)	23
Danish Albums (Hitlisten)	13
Dutch Albums (Album Top 100)	61
European Albums (Music & Media)	9
Finnish Albums (Suomen virallinen lista)	11
French Albums (SNEP)	21
German Albums (Offizielle Top 100)	7
Greek International Albums (IFPI)	8
Irish Albums (IRMA)	12
Italian Albums (FIMI)	37
Japanese Albums (Oricon)	26
New Zealand Albums (RMNZ)	17
Norwegian Albums (VG-lista)	17
Portuguese Albums (AFP)	20
Scottish Albums (OCC)	6
Swedish Albums (Sverigetopplistan)	11
Swiss Albums (Schweizer Hitparade)	24
UK Albums (OCC)	6
US Billboard 200	41
US Top Dance Albums (Billboard)	2

=== Year-end charts ===
2001 year-end chart performance for Get Ready
Chart (2001)	Position
US Top Dance/Electronic Albums (Billboard)	8

2002 year-end chart performance for Get Ready
Chart (2002)	Position
US Top Dance/Electronic Albums (Billboard)	25

== Certifications ==
Certifications for Get Ready
Region	Certification	Certified units/sales
Australia (ARIA)	Gold	35,000^{^}
France (SNEP)	Gold	100,000^{*}
United Kingdom (BPI)	Gold	100,000^{^}
^{*} Sales figures based on certification alone.^{^} Shipments figures based on certification alone.
