= The Slow Readers Club =

English rock band

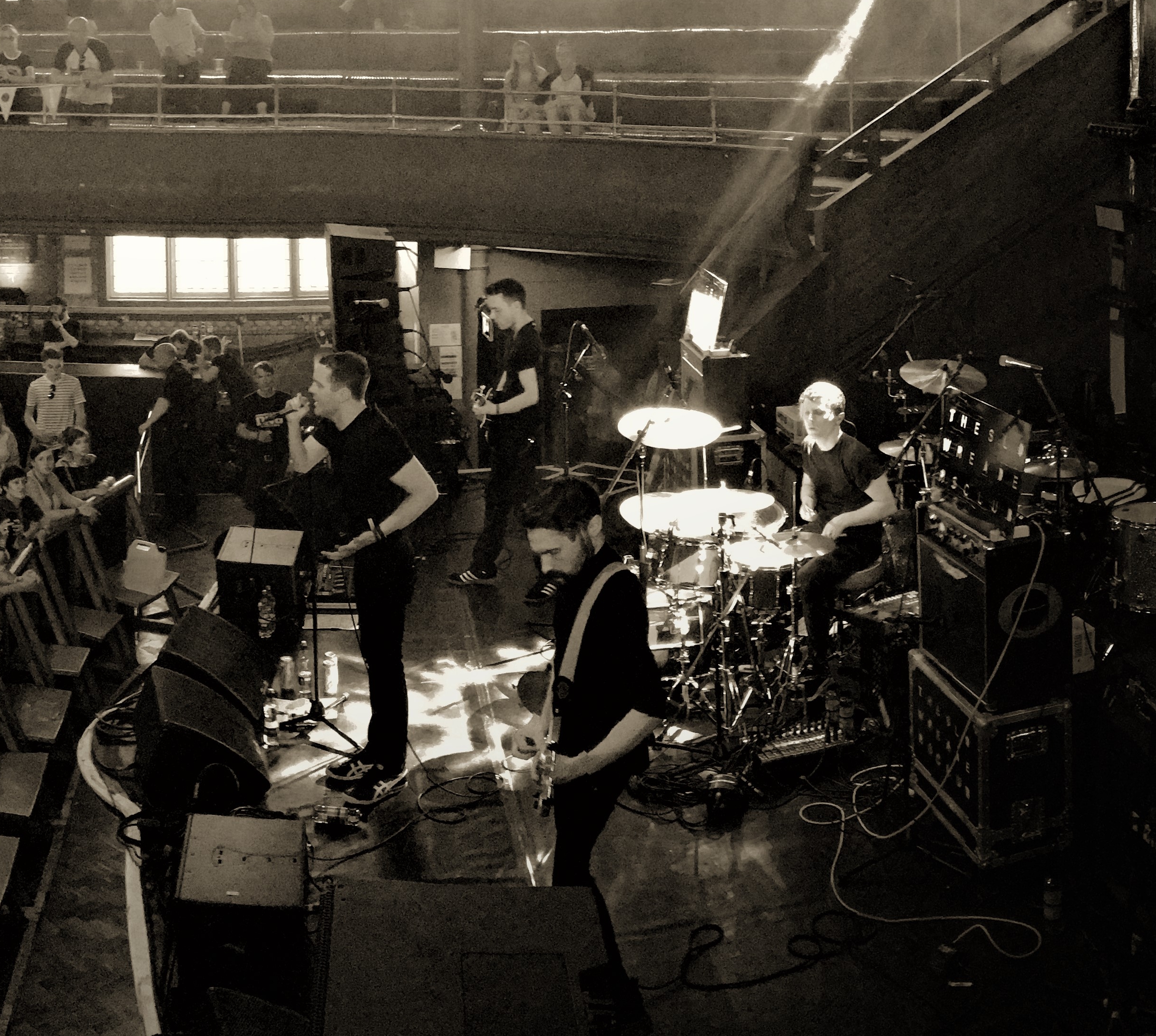
- The Slow Readers Club performing in 2017

Background information
- Origin: Manchester, England
- Genres: Indie pop; indie rock; alternative rock
- Years active: 2009–present
- Label: Modern Sky UK
- Members: Aaron Starkie; Kurtis Starkie; James Ryan; David Whitworth
- Website: theslowreadersclub.co.uk

The Slow Readers Club is an English rock band from Manchester. Their third studio album, Build a Tower, was a UK Top 20 hit album, reaching number 18. Their follow-up, The Joy of the Return, made it to the top 10, peaking at number 9 in March 2020.

== Omerta ==
The Slow Readers Club evolved from earlier band Omerta. They formed in 2003 and signed to Northern Ambition in 2005 when they released three singles, each of which sold out on the day of release and became collector's editions. Their double A-side debut Everything Is Frozen / Learn To Love The System was followed by One More Chance and their final single One More Minute. Despite strong career prospects with support from Steve Lamacq and others, the band dispersed around 2007 with no apparent prospect of further collaboration.

== The Slow Readers Club ==
Despite the disbanding of Omerta, James Ryan and Aaron Starkie continued to jam together and eventually formed The Slow Readers Club. The band released their self-titled debut album towards the end of 2011, featuring various former Omerta songs, but also three new singles "Feet On Fire", "Sirens" and "Block Out The Sun".

The band underwent a number of line up changes before settling on the current four-piece line-up of Aaron Starkie on vocals, Kurtis Starkie on guitar and backing vocals, James Ryan on bass and David Whitworth on drums, at which point their career progressed. In 2013, they released a one-off single "Forever In Your Debt", featuring a more radio-friendly sound. The B-side was "Days Like This Will Break Your Heart". Gradually, the band regained the old momentum that Omerta once had, as their live following around Manchester started to grow through a combination of word of mouth and support slots for such bands as Catfish and the Bottlemen. Various eventual tracks from their second album, Cavalcade, were introduced to the live set during this time.

Brothers Aaron and Kurtis both hail from the Wythenshawe area of South Manchester.

== Cavalcade ==
Prior to the release of Cavalcade in April 2015, the band released a series of singles - "Start Again", "Don't Mind" and "I Saw a Ghost" - that gained considerable airplay from such DJs as Steve Lamacq (who played and discussed the track "Don't Mind" on his BBC Radio 6 Music show Roundtable in September 2014) and Chris Hawkins on 6 Music as well as Hattie Pearson on XFM. They played XFM's First Friday club night at the Band on the Wall in Manchester and were filmed performing "I Saw a Ghost" acoustically in Manchester Central Library, months after they had become the first band to play the newly revamped library. The show was recorded for release as Live At The Library, a digital only album featuring songs from both albums to date.

The band were playing bigger Manchester shows and also playing gigs further afield such as in Italy and Ireland. By the time Cavalcade was released in April 2015, a Manchester Academy show had sold out three weeks in advance. This was to herald a summer of festival headline slots at Far Out Festival, Headlander and the Manchester Food And Drink Festival as well as well-received sets at the Isle Of Wight Festival, Sheffield's Tramlines festival and a set at Ramsbottom Festival, which saw queues of festival attendees for the tent in which they were playing. The band finished the year with a sold-out concert at Gorilla in Manchester as part of a successful national tour.

Cavalcade took first place in Manchester blog's Even The Stars' albums of the year 2015 poll. There was another sold-out Manchester show at St Philips Church followed by a bigger national tour and dates in Montpellier and Dublin, While writing songs for their third album, they performed at a sold-out David Bowie tribute event at Sound Control in Manchester where they performed an acoustic version of "Life on Mars" to the audience of Bowie fans.

Around this time that Jim Glennie of James tweeted a video of the Starkies performing an acoustic version of "I Saw a Ghost" in Manchester Central Library for video blog Matter Of Sound produced by Radio X's Hattie Pearson. Following on from this, The Slow Readers Club supported James on their Girl At The End Of The World tour in May 2016 personal invitation of Glennie and Saul Davies. The tour encompassed venues such as Bristol Colston Hall, Southend Cliffs Pavilion, London Kentish Town Forum and Brixton Academy, Llandudno Venue Cymru, Manchester Arena, Hull City Hall and Newcastle City Hall. One special night was at Bournemouth O2 Academy where the Starkies performed an acoustic set as Whitworth was absent to be at the birth of his children. The remaining band were joined on stage by Saul Davies who played violin on "Forever In Your Debt". Prior to the tour, the band made their first visit to Ireland and sold out The Workman's Club solely on the basis of word of mouth and the support of local radio station TXFM.

In the wake of the success of the tour, the band played at several major festivals, filling out a tent at Kendal Calling, playing two sets at Victorious Festival in Portsmouth as well as appearing at Yorfest, Tramlines in Sheffield and Castlepolooza in Ireland and finally headlining the second stage at Ramsbottom Festival.

Despite still being unsigned and maintaining day jobs, a show at Manchester's Ritz on 18 November 2016 sold out two months in advance. The show was streamed online live and featured seventeen songs from the first two albums plus two new songs "Lunatic" and "Through The Shadows" from the upcoming third album. The Manchester Evening News stated of the show "It would be wrong to call them Manchester's best kept secret, because any band who can sell out the Ritz is clearly not a secret. But alongside the likes of Cabbage and Blossoms, The Slow Readers Club are currently one of the most exciting sounds coming out of our fair city." Further gigs at the 500-capacity Whelan's venue in Dublin and the 600-capacity Hackney Oslo in London also sold out. The band played three further dates with James at Nottingham Royal Concert Hall, Sheffield Academy and Wolverhampton Wulfrun Hall in December.

== Build a Tower ==
Released in May 2018, Build a Tower is the band's third album. It stayed briefly in the Top 20 of the UK Albums Chart. The band went on tour to support the album. According to the Lancashire Post, The Slow Readers Club are the band you probably have never heard of, and yet they manage to sell out venues like The Apollo and the Ritz in Manchester.

== Discography ==
=== Studio albums ===
Title	Album details	Peak chart positions
Title	Album details	UK
The Slow Readers Club	Released: 5 December 2011; Label: Self-released; Format: CD, digital	—
Cavalcade	Released: 13 April 2015; Label: Self-released; Format: CD, vinyl, digital	—
Build a Tower	Released: 4 May 2018; Label: Modern Sky; Format: CD, vinyl (limited edition), cassette, digital	18
The Joy of the Return	Released: 20 March 2020; Label: Modern Sky; Format: Digital	9
91 Days In Isolation	Released: 23 October 2020; Label: SRC Records; Format: CD, digital, vinyl, cassette	33
Knowledge Freedom Power	Released: 24 February 2023; Label: Velveteen Records; Format: CD, digital, vinyl, cassette	29
Out of a Dream	Released: 21 March 2025; Label: Self-released; Format: CD, digital, vinyl, cassette	11

=== Live albums ===
Title	Album details
Live at Central Library	Released: 1 December 2014; Label: Self-released; Format: Digital
Live from Festival No.6	Released: 4 May 2018; Label: Modern Sky; Format: CD, vinyl, digital
Live at O2 Apollo Manchester	Released: 25 October 2019; Label: Modern Sky; Format: Double CD, double vinyl (both formats with DVD included), digital

=== EPs ===
Title	Details
For All Here to Observe	Released: 14 September 2018; Label: Modern Sky; Format: Digital
