= 60 Miles an Hour =

2001 single by New Order

Single by New Order

from the album Get Ready
- B-side: "Sabotage"
- Released: 19 November 2001
- Length: 4:34 (album version); 3:50 (single version)
- Label: London
- Songwriter: New Order
- Producers: Steve Osborne; David Kahne

New Order singles chronology
"Crystal" (2001)	"60 Miles an Hour" (2001)	"Someone Like You" (2002)

"60 Miles an Hour" is a song by English musical group New Order, released as the second single from their seventh studio album, Get Ready. Released on 19 November 2001, it entered the UK Singles Chart at number 29 and reached number 37 in Australia the following year.

== Track listings ==
All tracks are written by Gillian Gilbert, Peter Hook, Stephen Morris and Bernard Sumner except where indicated.

CD 1: NUOCD9 (UK and Europe)
No.	Title	Length
1.	"60 Miles an Hour" (radio edit)	3:50
2.	"Sabotage"	4:50
3.	"Someone Like You" (Funk D'Void remix)	9:56

CD 2: NUCDP9 (UK and Europe)
No.	Title	Length
1.	"60 Miles an Hour" (Supermen Lovers remix)	4:56
2.	"Someone Like You" (James Holden Heavy dub)	6:56
3.	"Someone Like You" (Futureshock vocal remix)	8:05

DVD: NUDVD9 (UK)
No.	Title	Length
1.	"60 Miles an Hour" (radio edit)	3:47
2.	"Sabotage"	4:47
3.	"60 Miles an Hour" (video)	3:59

CD: 0927434532 (Australia) – Tour EP
No.	Title	Writer(s)	Length
1.	"60 Miles an Hour" (radio edit)		3:50
2.	"60 Miles an Hour" (Supermen Lovers remix)		4:55
3.	"Someone Like You" (Futureshock vocal remix)		8:07
4.	"Sabotage"		4:50
5.	"True Faith" (Reading Festival 30/08/98)	Gilbert, Stephen Hague, Hook, Morris, Sumner	5:35
6.	"Temptation" (Reading Festival 30/08/98)		7:33

== Charts ==
Chart (2001–2002)	Peak position
Australia (ARIA)	37
Europe (Eurochart Hot 100)	98
Scotland Singles (OCC)	33
UK Singles (OCC)	29
