= New Order (band) =

English rock band

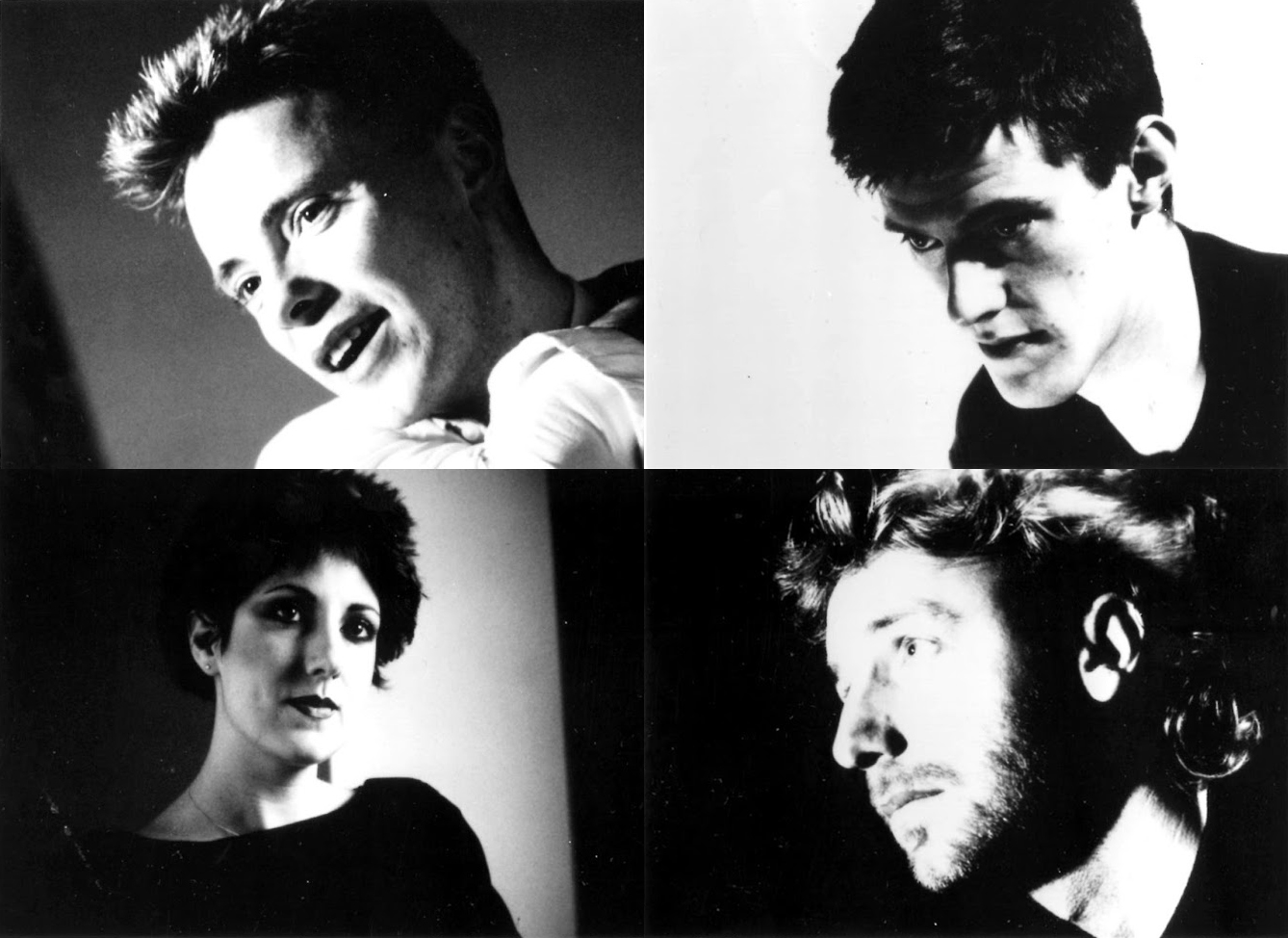
- Promotional images of New Order in 1985; clockwise from top left: Bernard Sumner, Stephen Morris, Peter Hook, Gillian Gilbert

Background information
- Origin: Salford, England
- Genres: Alternative dance; synth-pop; post-punk; alternative rock
- Years active: 1980–1993; 1998–2007; 2011–present
- Labels: Factory; London; Qwest; Warner Bros.; Reprise; Mute
- Spinoffs: See other projects: Electronic; Revenge; The Other Two; Monaco; Bad Lieutenant; Freebass; Peter Hook and the Light
- Spinoff of: Joy Division
- Members: Bernard Sumner; Stephen Morris; Gillian Gilbert; Phil Cunningham; Tom Chapman
- Past members: Peter Hook
- Website: neworder.com

New Order are an English rock band formed in Manchester in 1980 by vocalist, guitarist and keyboardist Bernard Sumner, bassist Peter Hook, and drummer Stephen Morris, with keyboardist Gillian Gilbert joining the band shortly after. Sumner, Hook and Morris were previously members of Joy Division, which had disbanded earlier in 1980 after the suicide of lead singer Ian Curtis. Their fusion of post-punk and electronic dance music made them one of the most acclaimed and influential bands of the 1980s, and pioneers of alternative dance. They became the flagship band for the Manchester-based independent record label Factory Records and its nightclub, The Haçienda. They worked in a long-term collaboration with graphic designer Peter Saville who worked on their album covers.

While the band's early years were initially overshadowed by Joy Division's post-punk legacy, their experience in the early 1980s New York club scene led them to incorporate dance rhythms and electronic instrumentation into their work. Their 1983 hit "Blue Monday" became the best-selling 12-inch single of all time and a popular club track. In the 1980s, they released several successful albums, such as Power, Corruption & Lies (1983), Technique (1989), and the singles compilation album Substance (1987). The band disbanded in 1993 to focus on their individual projects but reunited in 1998. Since then, New Order have gone through various hiatuses and changes in personnel, most notably the departure of Hook in 2007 due to personal disputes with the other members. In 2015, they released their tenth studio album, Music Complete. In 2026, both Joy Division and New Order were inducted as one act into the Rock and Roll Hall of Fame.

== History ==
=== Origins and formation: 1977–1980 ===
Between 1977 and 1980, Bernard Sumner, Stephen Morris, Peter Hook, and Ian Curtis were members of the post-punk band Joy Division, often featuring heavy production input from producer Martin Hannett. Curtis died by suicide on 18 May 1980, the day before Joy Division were scheduled to depart for their first North American tour, and before the release of the band's second studio album, Closer.

Before Curtis' death, the band had agreed to stop using the name Joy Division if any member died or left. Thus, when the three remaining members decided to continue without him, they chose to perform under a different name. During the summer of 1980, the remaining members recorded their first demos, including a track called "Haystack" with vocalist Kevin Hewick, whom Factory's co-founder Tony Wilson had suggested as the band's new frontman. On 29 July 1980, the as-yet unnamed trio debuted live at Manchester's Beach Club. Rob Gretton, the band's manager for over twenty years, is credited with finding the name New Order in an article in The Guardian titled "The New Order of Kampuchean Rebels". They also considered the name The Witch Doctors of Zimbabwe, before finally choosing New Order of Kampuchean Rebels, which was narrowed down to the name New Order despite its previous use for former Stooge Ron Asheton's band the New Order. The group emphasised that the name New Order, like Joy Division, was not intended to reference Nazism or fascism.

New Order embarked on a short US tour in early autumn 1980. In these shows, Sumner, Morris and Hook all sang lead vocals on different tracks. Sumner ultimately took the role of frontman even though he struggled to sing while playing guitar. During this tour, the band recorded two tracks written by Joy Division: "Ceremony" and "In a Lonely Place", which were released as New Order's debut single in January 1981.

The band wanted to complete the line-up with someone they knew well and whose musical skills and style were compatible with their own. Gretton suggested Morris's girlfriend Gillian Gilbert, and she was invited to join the band in early October 1980 as keyboardist and guitarist. She made her live debut with the band at the Squat in Manchester on 25 October 1980. As a quartet, New Order subsequently re-recorded "Ceremony", which was released as a twelve-inch single in September 1981.

=== Movement: 1981–1982 ===
New Order's first commercial release was the single "Ceremony", backed with "In a Lonely Place". These two songs were written in the weeks before Curtis took his own life. With the release of their debut album, Movement, in November 1981, New Order initially started on a similar route as their previous incarnation, performing dark, melodic songs, albeit with an increased use of synthesizers. The band viewed the period as a low point, as they were still reeling from Curtis's death. Hook commented that the only positive thing to come out of the Movement sessions was that producer Martin Hannett showed the band how to use a mixing board. This allowed the band to produce records by themselves from then on. More recently, Hook indicated a change of heart: "I think Movement gets a raw deal in general, really—for me, when you consider the circumstances in which it was written, it is a fantastic record."

New Order visited New York City again in 1981, where the band were introduced to post-disco, freestyle, and electro. To cheer themselves up, the band started listening to Italian disco while Morris taught himself drum programming. The singles that followed, "Everything's Gone Green" and "Temptation", saw a change in direction toward dance music and the departure of producer Martin Hannett, who walked off halfway through the mix of "Everything's Gone Green", leading the band to produce "Temptation" themselves.

The Haçienda, Factory Records' own nightclub (largely funded by New Order), opened in May 1982 in Manchester and was even issued a Factory catalogue number: FAC51. The opening of the UK's first-ever superclub was marked by a nearly 23-minute instrumental piece originally entitled "Prime 5 8 6", but released 15 years later as "Video 5 8 6". Composed primarily by Sumner and Morris, "Prime 5 8 6"/"Video 5 8 6" was an early version of "5 8 6" that contained rhythm elements that would later surface on "Blue Monday" and "Ultraviolence".

=== Power, Corruption & Lies: 1983–1984 ===
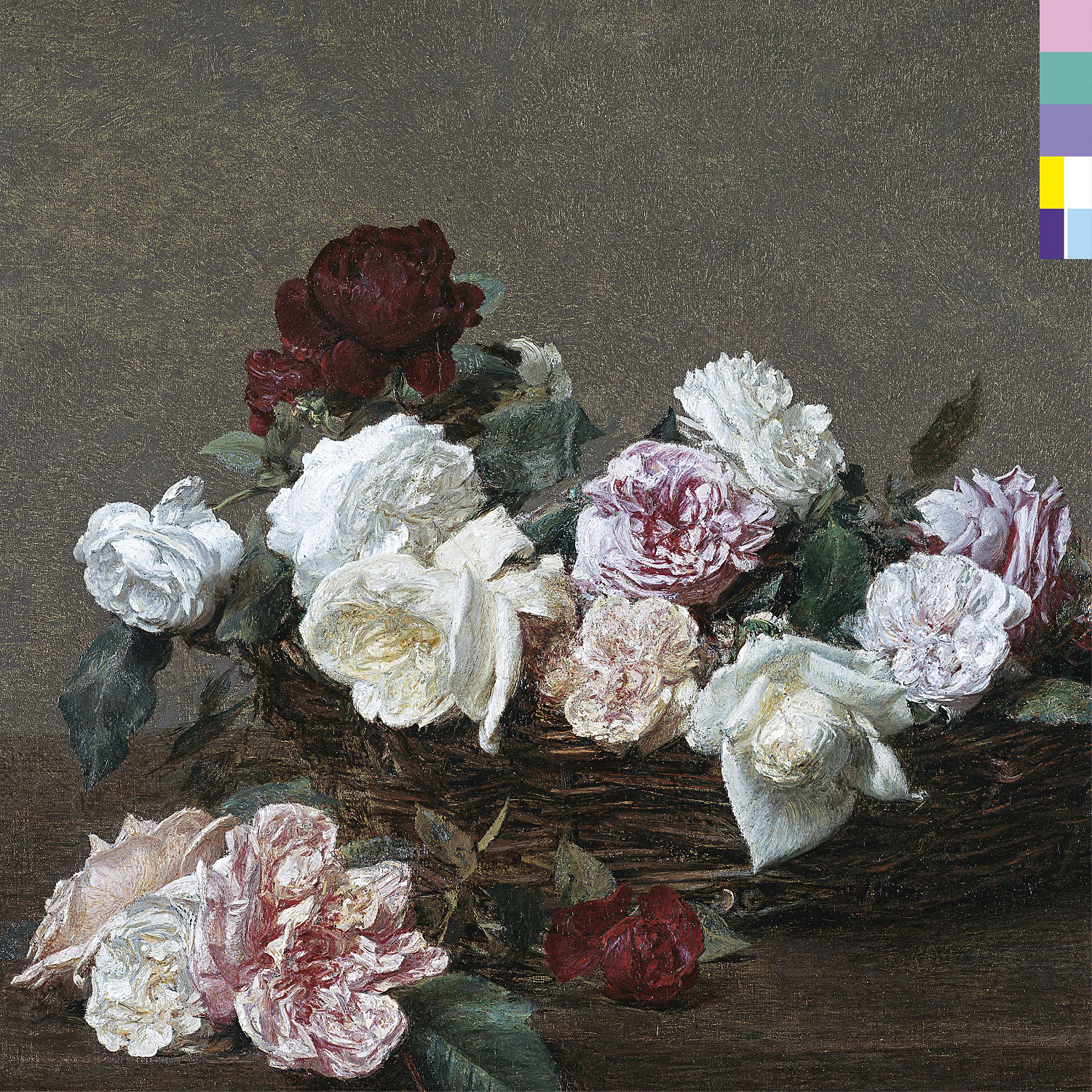
Front cover of Power, Corruption & Lies

"Blue Monday" (1983)
An excerpt from "Blue Monday" featuring the distinctive kick drum opening

New Order's second LP, Power, Corruption & Lies, was released in May 1983. This synth-pop album incorporated some of the post-punk style sound from their previous band, Joy Division, and their first album, Movement. The band had been hinting at the increased use of technology during the music-making process for a number of years then, including their work as Joy Division. Starting from what earlier singles had hinted, this was where the band found their footing, mixing early techno music with their earlier guitar-based sound and showing the strong influence of acts like Kraftwerk and Giorgio Moroder. Even further in this direction was the electronically sequenced, four-on-the-floor single "Blue Monday". Inspired by Klein + M.B.O.'s "Dirty Talk" and Sylvester's disco classic "You Make Me Feel (Mighty Real)", "Blue Monday" became the best-selling independent 12-inch single of all time in the UK; however, it was not on the track list of Power, Corruption & Lies. The song was included only on the cassette format in some countries, such as Australia and New Zealand, and on the original North American CD release of the album, alongside its B-side, "The Beach". "Blue Monday" was also included on the 2008 collector's edition of Power, Corruption & Lies.

The 1983 single "Confusion" firmly established the group as a dance music force, inspiring many musicians in subsequent years. In 1984 they followed the largely synthesized single "Thieves Like Us" with the heavy guitar-drum-bass rumble of "Murder", a not-too-distant cousin of "Ecstasy" from the Power, Corruption & Lies album.

=== Low-Life, Brotherhood, and Substance: 1985–1987 ===
Released in 1985, Low-Life refined and sometimes mixed the two styles, guitar-based and electronic, and included "The Perfect Kiss" – with a music video directed by Jonathan Demme – and "Sub-culture". In February 1986, the soundtrack album to Pretty in Pink featuring "Shellshock" was released on A&M Records. An instrumental version of "Thieves Like Us" and the instrumental "Elegia" appeared in the film but were not on the soundtrack album. Later that summer, New Order headlined a line-up that included the Smiths, the Fall, and A Certain Ratio during the Festival of the Tenth Summer at Manchester's G-Mex.

Brotherhood (1986) divided the two approaches onto separate album sides. The album notably featured "Bizarre Love Triangle" (a Top 20 hit in Australia and New Zealand) and "Angel Dust" (of which a remixed instrumental version is available on the UK "True Faith" CD video single, under the title "Evil Dust"), a track which marries a synth break beat with Low-Life-era guitar effects. While New Order toured North America with friends Echo & the Bunnymen, the summer of 1987 saw the release of the compilation Substance, which featured the new single "True Faith". Substance was an important album in collecting the group's 12-inch singles onto CD for the first time and featured new versions of "Temptation" and "Confusion"—referred to as "Temptation '87" and "Confusion '87". A second disc featured several of the B-sides from the singles on the first disc, as well as additional A-sides "Procession" and "Murder". The single, "True Faith", with its surreal video, became a hit on MTV and the band's first American top 40 hit. The single's B-side, "1963"—originally planned on being the A-side until the group's label convinced them to release "True Faith" instead—would later be released as a single in its own right several years later, with two new versions.

In December 1987, the band released a further single, "Touched by the Hand of God", with a Kathryn Bigelow-directed video parodying glam-metal. The song was one of four new tracks recorded for the American comedy film Salvation!, and reached number 20 on the UK Singles Chart and number 1 in the UK Independent Singles Chart. However, it would not appear on an album until the 1994 compilation The Best of New Order.

=== Technique, Republic and first break-up: 1988–1993 ===
By this time, the group was heavily influenced by the Balearic sounds of Ibiza, which were making their way into the Haçienda. Partly recorded at Mediterranean Sound studios on Ibiza, Technique was released in February 1989. The album entered the charts at number one in the UK and contained a mix of acid house influence (as on the opening track "Fine Time") and a more traditional rock sound (as on the single "Run 2"). The album is a blend of upbeat, accessible music coupled with blunt, poignant lyrics. During the summer of 1989, New Order supported Technique by touring with Public Image Ltd, Throwing Muses and the Sugarcubes across the United States and Canada in what the press dubbed the "Monsters of Alternative Rock" tour. Around this time, band members also began side projects, including Electronic (Sumner with Johnny Marr) and Revenge (Hook with Davyth Hicks). Morris and Gilbert began to work together on outside TV theme production work. In 1991, the band was sued by the publishing company of American singer John Denver, who claimed that the guitar break in "Run 2" was similar to his song "Leaving on a Jet Plane". The case was settled out of court, and the song has since been credited to both New Order and John Denver.

In 1990, New Order recorded the official song of the England national football team's 1990 World Cup campaign, "World in Motion", under the ad hoc band name EnglandNewOrder. The song, co-written by comedian Keith Allen, was the band's sole number one UK hit. The song was originally planned to be titled "E for England"; however the Football Association vetoed the title upon realizing that this was a reference to ecstasy, a drug heavily associated with the Hacienda. (Allen claimed that his original draft lyrics included "E is for England, England starts with E / We'll all be smiling when we're in Italy.") The song also featured chanting from members of the England team and Allen, and a guest rap from England player John Barnes. It was again produced by Stephen Hague, whom the band chose to produce their next album.

The band's next album, Republic, was shadowed by the collapse of their long-time label, Factory Records, in 1992. The label had been ailing due to financial difficulties and was forced to declare bankruptcy. New Order never had a formal contract with Factory Records; although unusual for a major group, this was Factory's standard practice until the mid-1980s. Because of this, the band, rather than Factory Records, legally owned all of their recordings. This has been cited by Wilson himself as the main reason why London Records' 1992 offer to buy the ailing label fell through. Following Factory's collapse, New Order signed with London Records, as did Morris and Gilbert separately for their side project, the Other Two. The Other Two's debut album was originally intended for release on Factory. Republic, released around the world in 1993, spawned the singles "Regret"—New Order's highest-charting single in the US—"Ruined in a Day", "World", and "Spooky".

Following the release and promotion of Republic, the band put New Order on hold while focusing on side projects, with the Other Two's debut album released in 1993. In 1994, a second singles collection was released, entitled The Best of New Order. It featured all of the band's singles since Substance as well as a few extra tracks: "Vanishing Point" (from 1989's Technique), "The Perfect Kiss", "Thieves Like Us", "Shellshock", and remixes of "True Faith", "Bizarre Love Triangle", "1963", and "Round & Round". The new versions of "True Faith" and "1963" (the latter as a more guitar-orientated version produced by Arthur Baker) were released as singles to promote the album. In the US, the track listing was altered to set it apart from Substance as well as the UK release of The Best of New Order, which had been available months prior. This collection was followed by a remix album, The Rest of New Order, featuring a selection of existing and newly commissioned mixes of classic New Order tracks. Some versions contained an extra disc or cassette composed entirely of remixes of "Blue Monday". "Blue Monday" was released as a single for a third time to promote the collection.

=== Reformation and Get Ready: 1998–2003 ===
The group reconvened in 1998 at the suggestion of Rob Gretton, nearly five years since they had last seen each other. Sumner said, "We decided before we agreed to doing any gig, to have a meeting, and if anyone had any grudges to bear, to iron them out." By the second meeting everyone agreed to continue playing, scheduling their reunion gig for the Phoenix Festival that same year. In addition to rarer songs, New Order also decided to begin playing Joy Division songs again. When the Phoenix Festival was cancelled due to low ticket sales, New Order instead played the last night of that year's Reading Festival.

Their 2001 album Get Ready largely departed from their more electronic style and focused on more guitar-orientated music. According to Sumner, "Get Ready was guitar-heavy simply because we felt that we'd left that instrument alone for a long time." Long-time fan Billy Corgan of the Smashing Pumpkins played guitar and sang backup on the track "Turn My Way", and in 2001 toured with the band on dates in the UK, US, and Japan for a short period of time. Phil Cunningham (formerly of Marion) joined the band in a live capacity, deputizing for Gilbert, who declined to tour in favour of caring for her and Morris' children. Primal Scream's Bobby Gillespie provided vocals on the track "Rock the Shack". Singles from the album included "Crystal", "60 Miles an Hour" and "Someone Like You".

In 2002 New Order released the single "Here to Stay", produced by the Chemical Brothers, which also featured on the soundtrack to the Michael Winterbottom film 24 Hour Party People. The film depicts the rise and fall of Factory Records and features portrayals of the band. Scenes from the film appear in the single's music video.

Also in 2002, Q featured New Order on their list of the "50 Bands to See Before You Die", although this was as part of a sub-list of "5 Bands That Could Go Either Way".

=== Waiting for the Sirens' Call, Singles and second break-up: 2004–2007 ===
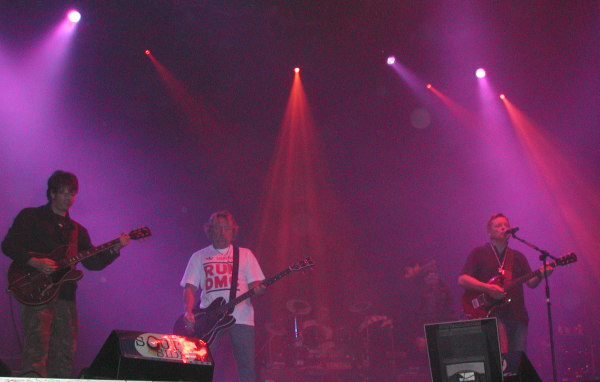
New Order performing in 2005

The band released a new album on 27 March 2005, titled Waiting for the Sirens' Call, which was their first with new member Phil Cunningham. Cunningham replaced Gilbert (now married to Morris) so she could look after their children. Singles from this album were "Krafty", "Jetstream" (which features guest vocals by Ana Matronic from Scissor Sisters), and the title track. At the 2005 NME Awards, New Order and Joy Division received the award for "Godlike Geniuses" (for lifetime achievement). Previous winners include Ozzy Osbourne, the Clash, and Happy Mondays. In 2006 the album track "Guilt Is a Useless Emotion" was nominated for a Grammy Award in the category of Best Dance Recording.

In the autumn of 2005, the group released another greatest hits compilation, in the form of Singles. The two-disc release was an updated version of the Substance collection and contained every single released from their 1981 debut all the way through to "Waiting for the Sirens' Call". However, unlike Substance, which focused almost exclusively on the 12-inch versions of the group's singles, Singles collected the 7-inch versions, many of which (like "Ceremony", "Temptation" and "Confusion") had never been released on CD. The album was accompanied by a two-disc DVD set, titled Item, that collected the extended UK version of the documentary NewOrderStory with a DVD of all New Order music videos as well as two newly commissioned videos for "Temptation '87" and "Ceremony".

The New Order: Live in Glasgow DVD was recorded at the Glasgow Academy in 2006 and features 18 tracks, including 4 Joy Division songs. Next to that, the release also contains a bonus disc of footage from the band's personal archive, including 1980s footage from Glastonbury (June 1981), Rome, Cork, Rotterdam and Toronto.

In 2006, the band played several one-off live dates as well as short tours in the UK, Brazil and Argentina. After their Buenos Aires show in November 2006, Hook suggested that the band should stop touring. In early May 2007, Hook was interviewed by British radio station XFM—originally to talk about his contribution to the debut album of Jane's Addiction singer Perry Farrell's new band, Satellite Party—and stated that "Me and Bernard aren't working together." Further complicating the news, NewOrderOnline, a website with support from New Order management, reported that according to "a source close to the band", "The news about the split is false... New Order still exists despite what [Hook] said ... Peter Hook can leave the band, but this doesn't mean the end of New Order." However, Sumner revealed in 2009 that he no longer wished to make music as New Order.

=== Reunion with new line-up, Lost Sirens and Music Complete: 2011–2016 ===
In September 2011, the band announced that they would perform for the first time since 2006 at the Ancienne Belgique, Brussels, on 17 October and at the Bataclan, Paris, on 18 October. The band's line-up included keyboardist Gilbert, who returned to the band after a ten-year break, and Bad Lieutenant bassist Tom Chapman in place of Peter Hook. They played subsequent shows in London and South America in December and released Live at the London Troxy, a live album from their performance on 10 December 2011 at The Troxy in London.

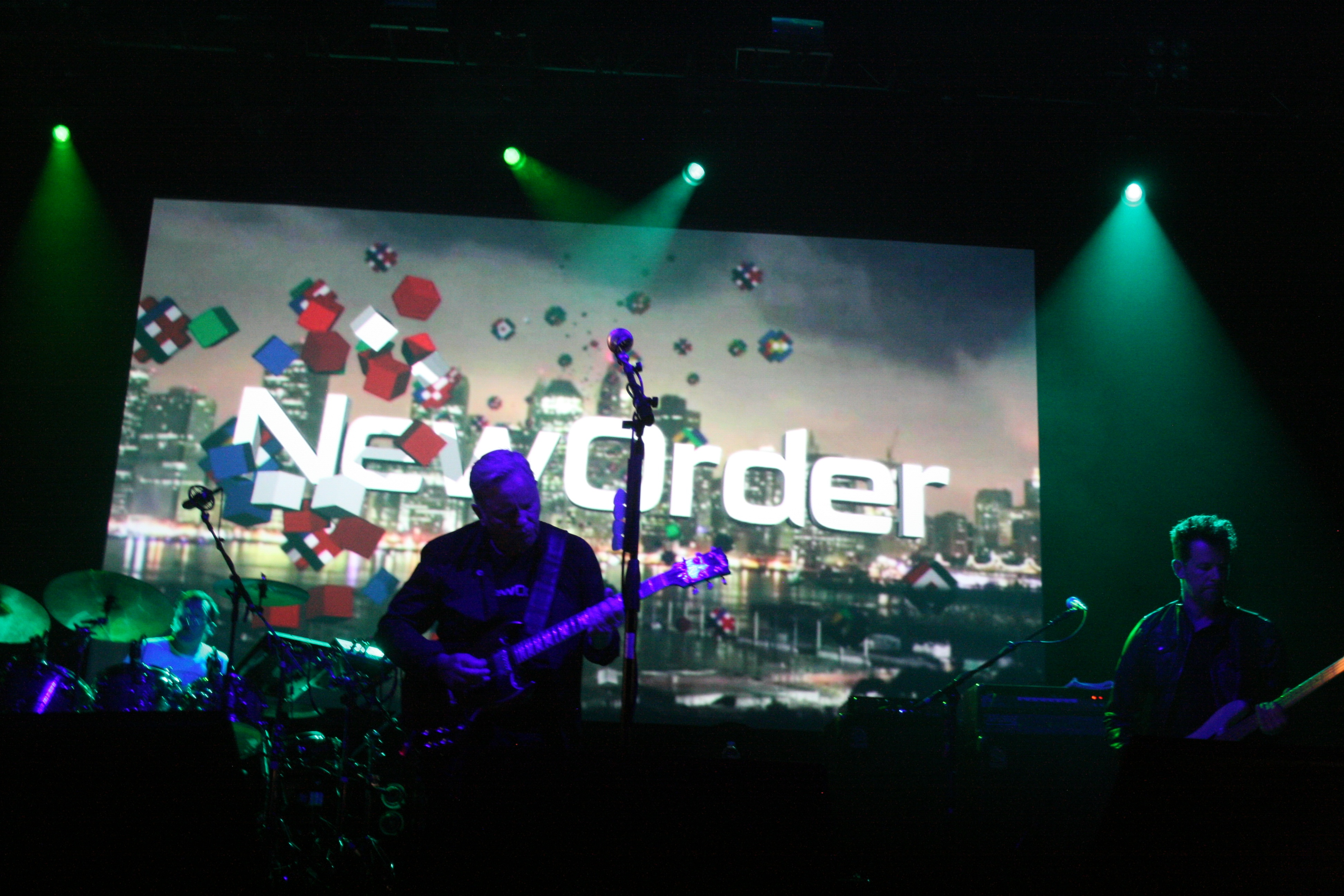
New Order performing in 2012

They continued to tour throughout 2012, including a short tour of New Zealand and Australia in February/March and several festival appearances in 2012. New Order performed at Hyde Park with Blur and the Specials to celebrate the closing of the 2012 Summer Olympics.

Lost Sirens was released in the United Kingdom in January 2013. Lost Sirens is an eight-track album of songs recorded during the sessions for Waiting for the Sirens' Call. The album was discussed by Gilbert in a Brazilian interview to promote the band's appearance in São Paulo. She acknowledged issues with Hook and stated there was "a lot going on behind the scenes on the copyright" delaying the release.

The band debuted their first new song since the Waiting for the Sirens' Call sessions, "Singularity", during Lollapalooza Chile in March 2014. In July, the group toured North America, where they debuted another song, "Plastic". On 2 September the band signed to Mute Records. The New Order back catalogue remains with Warner Music.

In September 2015, the band released a new album, Music Complete, their first without Peter Hook. The album was produced mostly by the band themselves, except "Singularity" and "Unlearn This Hatred", both produced by Tom Rowlands, while "Superheated" features additional production by Stuart Price.

In May 2016, New Order released a follow-up remix album, Complete Music, which consists of extended and reworked mixes of each track from Music Complete.

In November 2015, Hook sued Sumner, Morris and Gilbert. In an objection, it was revealed that Sumner, Morris and Gilbert had set up a new company behind Hook's back, which generated an income of £7.8 million in four years, while Hook received only a fraction of that sum. The three members argued they had treated Hook fairly and that his stake in the band's royalties was reasonable, despite the fact that in four years, Hook had only received "1.25 per cent of the band's royalties and other income from merchandising and performances". The judge ruled that there was "at least a reasonable prospect" of Hook proving that he was not getting a fair share of royalties and other income and rejected Sumner and Morris's lawyer's argument. The judge was willing to hear the case but urged the parties to come to an agreement rather than suffer legal costs of around £900,000. On 20 September 2017, the band announced that a full and final settlement had been reached in the dispute.

=== Touring and recent work: 2017–present ===
On 13 July 2017, New Order played a concert at Manchester International Festival with Liam Gillick. In July 2019 the performance was released as a live album titled Σ(No,12k,Lg,17Mif) New Order + Liam Gillick: So it goes.. (Live at MIF). The collaboration between Gillick and New Order was the subject of the documentary feature New Order: Decades, directed by Mike Christie and broadcast in the UK by Sky Arts and Showtime in the US.

The band toured the Americas in 2018 and Europe in 2019. In February 2020, New Order announced the Unity tour in North America, co-headlining with the Pet Shop Boys. These dates were ultimately postponed to 2022 because of the COVID-19 pandemic.

In September 2020, the band released the single, "Be a Rebel", their first new song in five years. A music video, directed by Spanish filmmakers NYSU, was released in December.

In May 2021, the band released Education Entertainment Recreation (Live at Alexandra Palace), a live album and concert film recorded during their 2018 show at the Alexandra Palace in London. The Unity tour with the Pet Shop Boys commenced on 17 September 2022 in Toronto and ran until 16 October in Vancouver.

From 2023 to 2025, New Order toured North America, Europe, Japan and Australia. The band headlined festivals including South by Southwest, Primavera Sound, Corona Capital, Kilby Block Party and Cruel World Festival. During the band's 25 February 2025 show in Osaka, they played "State of the Nation" live for the first time since 1987.

On 29 June 2026, Sumner announced that Morris and Gilbert would not be touring with the band for the foreseeable future for "personal health reasons". Earlier that week, Hook said in an interview that he heard the two had left the band.

== Other projects ==
In 1988, Sumner teamed up with former Smiths guitarist Johnny Marr to form the group Electronic; Sumner and Marr also enlisted the help of Neil Tennant and Chris Lowe of the Pet Shop Boys. Electronic regrouped in 1996 for Raise the Pressure, which also featured Karl Bartos (formerly of Kraftwerk). The project's third album, Twisted Tenderness, was released in 1999; after the album's release, the band dissolved.

In June 2009, Sumner formed a new band called Bad Lieutenant with Phil Cunningham (guitar) and Jake Evans (guitar and vocals). Their album Never Cry Another Tear was released on 5 October 2009. In addition to Cunningham and Evans, the album also features appearances by Stephen Morris (drums), Jack Mitchell (drums), Tom Chapman (bass) and Alex James (bass). The live band included Morris on drums and Chapman on bass.

Hook has been involved with several other projects. In the 1990s, Hook recorded with Killing Joke with a view to joining the band. However, original bassist Martin 'Youth' Glover instead returned to the band. In 1995, he toured with the Durutti Column. He has recorded one album with the band Revenge with Davyth Hicks and Chris Jones and two with Monaco (both as bassist, keyboardist and lead vocalist) with David Potts. Monaco scored a club and alternative radio hit with "What Do You Want From Me?" in 1997. Hook also formed a band called Freebass with fellow bass players Mani (the Stone Roses) and Andy Rourke (the Smiths) in addition to vocalist Gary Briggs. Freebass was active from 2007 to 2010. He also contributed to Perry Farrell's Satellite Party. Hook's current band, Peter Hook and the Light is touring and performing full albums from both Joy Division and New Order.

In 1990, Gilbert and Morris formed their own band, The Other Two. The Other Two released its first single, "Tasty Fish" in 1991 and released two albums, The Other Two & You in 1993 and Super Highways in 1999. They have also been involved in scoring television soundtracks, like Making Out. In 2007, Gilbert and Morris remixed two tracks for the Nine Inch Nails remixes album Year Zero Remixed.

=== BeMusic ===
"BeMusic" was a name the band used for their publishing company (the LP label for Movement says "B Music" in large letters, though using an italic ß for the letter B). All four members of the band used the name for production work for other artists' recordings between 1982 and 1985.

BeMusic was first credited when Peter Hook produced Stockholm Monsters in 1982. Other artists with producer or musician credit for "BeMusic" were 52nd Street, Section 25, Marcel King, Quando Quango, Paul Haig, Thick Pigeon, Nyam Nyam, and Life.

Their production work as BeMusic was collected on two LTM Recordings compilation CDs, Cool As Ice: The BeMusic Productions and Twice As Nice (which also included production work by Donald Johnson of A Certain Ratio and Arthur Baker).

== Influences and style ==
New Order is known to incorporate elements of both rock and dance music, as showcased by the songs "Temptation" (1982), "Blue Monday" (1983), and "True Faith" (1987). According to AllMusic, the band is considered "the first alternative dance" music group, having "fused icy, gloomy post-punk with Kraftwerk-style synth-pop". Critics have also described the band as synth-pop, post-punk, alternative rock, new wave, dance-rock, electronic rock, and electronica.

Early influences on New Order included the rock musicians Neil Young, David Bowie, and Iggy Pop. Founding member Hook stated that the band's transition from playing cold, dark post-punk to producing more synthesizer-driven music from 1982, was inspired by the German electronic group Kraftwerk, the Giorgio Moroder/Donna Summer collaboration "I Feel Love", and the US rock band Sparks (who had produced disco/electro-rock music with Moroder on their No. 1 in Heaven album). Frontman Sumner noted that his shift in songwriting style was also influenced by English electronic groups such as Cabaret Voltaire, the Human League, and OMD.

Drummer Stephen Morris used a combination of acoustic and electronic drums, while all members of the band were observed switching instruments during live performances. This is documented in Jonathan Demme's video for "The Perfect Kiss" and the concert videos Taras Shevchenko (recorded in New York, November 1981) and Pumped Full of Drugs (Tokyo, May 1985). During live shows, Sumner alternated between guitar, keyboards, melodica, cowbell, and, during performances of "Confusion", bass guitar. Gilbert switched between keyboards and guitar, Morris between drums and keyboards, and Hook between bass and electronic drums. In early performances, band members sometimes left the stage before the final song "Temptation" had concluded, allowing sequencers and drum machines to complete the track.

=== Cover artwork ===
Almost all New Order recordings have distinctive packaging, and Peter Saville was the art director. The group's record sleeves bucked the 1980s trend by rarely showing the band members (with the exception of the Low-Life album) or even providing basic information such as the band name or title of the release. Song names were often hidden within the shrink-wrapped package, either on the disc itself (such as the "Blue Monday" single), on an inconspicuous part of an inner sleeve ("The Perfect Kiss" single), or written in a cryptic colour code invented by Saville (Power, Corruption & Lies, "Blue Monday", "Confusion"). Saville said his intention was to sell the band as a "mass-produced secret" of sorts and that the minimalist style was enough to allow fans to identify the band's products without explicit labelling. He frequently sent the artwork straight to the printer, without review by either the band or the label. Their 1983 album, Power, Corruption & Lies, was one of ten classic album covers from British artists commemorated on a UK postage stamp issued by the Royal Mail.

== Legacy ==
The band have influenced techno, rock, and pop musicians including Moby, the Killers, and the xx. Numerous covers of their songs have been released, notably Orgy's cover of "Blue Monday", as well as several tribute albums.

Dramatised versions of New Order appear in two films, 24 Hour Party People (2002) and Control (2007). 24 Hour Party People, directed by Michael Winterbottom, depicts the rise and fall of Factory Records as seen through the eyes of founder Tony Wilson, played by Steve Coogan. The film includes portrayals of manager Rob Gretton and designer Peter Saville. The soundtrack features several New Order tracks, including "Here to Stay" and a cover of "New Dawn Fades" featuring Moby. Control, directed by Anton Corbijn, traces Ian Curtis' life from the founding of Joy Division until his suicide. While the members of New Order are portrayed in the film, New Order as such is only hinted at in the final scene. In addition to several tracks on the soundtrack, New Order contributed the original incidental music.

=== Reputation ===
Following in the path of Joy Division, New Order were also among the most successful artists on the Factory Records label, which was run by Granada television personality Tony Wilson. New Order partnered with Factory to finance the Manchester club The Haçienda. Speaking in 2009, fellow synth-pop musician Phil Oakey described New Order's slow-burn career as cult musicians as being unusually prolonged and effective: "If you want to make a lot of money out of pop, be number 3 a lot. Like New Order did."

== Awards and nominations ==
Year	Awards	Work	Category	Result
1983	NME Awards	Power, Corruption & Lies	Best Dressed Sleeve	Won
1983	NME Awards	"Blue Monday"	Best Single	Won
1983	NME Awards	Themselves	Best Group	Won
1988	Brit Awards	"True Faith"	Best British Video	Won
1988	Pollstar Concert Industry Awards	Themselves	Most Creative Stage Production	Nominated
1990	Pollstar Concert Industry Awards	Themselves	Most Creative Stage Production	Nominated
1991	Ivor Novello Awards	"World in Motion"	Best Selling A Side	Nominated
1993	Mercury Prize	Republic	Album of the Year	Nominated
1993	Billboard Music Awards	Themselves	Top Modern Rock Tracks Artist	Nominated
1993	Billboard Music Awards	"Regret"	Top Modern Rock Track	Won
1994	Brit Awards	"Regret"	British Single of the Year	Nominated
1994	Brit Awards	"Regret"	British Video of the Year	Nominated
1994	International Dance Music Awards	"Regret"	Best Alternative 12"	Won
1994	D&AD Awards	"World (The Price of Love)"	Pop Promo Video	Wood Pencil
1999	Q Awards	Themselves	Q Inspiration Award	Won
2000	ASCAP Pop Music Awards	"Blue Monday"	Most Performed Song	Won
2001	Q Awards	"Crystal"	Best Single	Nominated
2001	Žebřík Music Awards	Themselves	Best International Surprise	Nominated
2005	NME Awards	Themselves	Godlike Genius Award	Won
2006	Grammy Awards	"Guilt is a Useless Emotion"	Best Dance Recording	Nominated
2006	MTV VMAJ	"Krafty"	Best Dance Video	Nominated
2012	UK Festival Awards	Themselves	Headliner of the Year	Won
2012	Artrocker Awards	Themselves	Legend Award	Won
2015	Q Awards	Themselves	Q Outstanding Contribution To Music	Won
2015	Q Awards	"Restless"	Best Track	Nominated
2015	Best Art Vinyl	Music Complete	Best Art Vinyl	Nominated
2016	International Dance Music Awards	"Plastic"	Best Alternative/Rock Dance Track	Nominated
2016	RTHK International Pop Poll Awards	Themselves	Top Group/Band	Nominated
2019	Silver Clef Awards	Bernard Sumner	Outstanding Achievement Award	Won
2024	Rolling Stone UK Awards	Themselves	The Icon Award	Won

== Band members ==
=== Current ===
- Bernard Sumner – lead vocals, guitar, keyboards, programming, melodica (1980–1993, 1998–2007, 2011–present)
- Stephen Morris – drums, acoustic and electronic percussion, keyboards, programming (1980–1993, 1998–2007, 2011–present; not touring 2026–present)
- Gillian Gilbert – keyboards, guitar, programming, occasional vocals (1980–1993, 1998–2001, 2011–present; not touring 2026–present)
- Phil Cunningham – guitar, keyboards, electronic percussion, programming (2001–2007, 2011–present)
- Tom Chapman – bass, keyboards, programming, backing vocals (2011–present)

=== Former ===
- Peter Hook – bass, electronic percussion, backing and occasional lead vocals (1980–1993, 1998–2007)

=== Touring ===
- Billy Corgan – guitar, keyboards (summer, 2001)

== Discography ==
- Movement (1981)
- Power, Corruption & Lies (1983)
- Low-Life (1985)
- Brotherhood (1986)
- Technique (1989)
- Republic (1993)
- Get Ready (2001)
- Waiting for the Sirens' Call (2005)
- Lost Sirens (2013)
- Music Complete (2015)

== Sources ==
- Flowers, Claude (1995). New Order + Joy Division: Dreams Never End. London: Omnibus Press. ISBN 0-7119-4308-7.
- Johnson, Mark (1984). An Ideal For Living: An History Of Joy Division. London: Bobcat Books.
- Middles, Mick (1996). From Joy Division to New Order: The Factory Story. London: Virgin Books. ISBN 0-7535-0041-8.
- Reynolds, Simon (2005). Rip It Up and Start Again: Postpunk 1978–1984. Penguin. ISBN 0-14-303672-6.
