= Run 2 =

Single by New Order

from the album Technique
- B-side: "MTO"
- Released: 28 August 1989
- Recorded: 1988
- Studio: Mediterranean, Ibiza, and Real World, Box
- Genre: Proto-acid house
- Length: 4:29 (album version); 3:45 (remix)
- Label: Factory - (FAC 273)
- Songwriters: John Denver; Gillian Gilbert; Peter Hook; Stephen Morris; Bernard Sumner
- Producer: New Order

New Order singles chronology
"Round & Round" (1989)	"Run 2" (1989)	"World in Motion" (1990)

"Run 2" is the nineteenth single by English rock and alternative dance band New Order. It was released by Factory Records on 28 August 1989 as the third and final single from their fifth studio album, Technique (1989). The album version was listed as simply "Run".

== Overview ==
"Run 2" was remixed by Scott Litt from the version on Technique, hence the appendage of "2" to the title. The main difference is that the song has been made more radio-friendly by editing down most of the long instrumental run-out and appending it with a final repeat of the chorus. Litt's mix strips back much of the echo and layers of synthesizers, and in place centres the mix on Sumner's vocal and the bass guitar of Peter Hook. Despite the effort taken to produce a radio single, only 20,000 of the Factory 12" release were ever pressed. 500 7-inch records were also pressed, for promotional use. The single was only released in the UK.

"Run 2" is backed with the B-side titled "MTO". This song recycles the line "You've got love technique" from the group's previous hit single "Fine Time" (this is the only lyric in the track). An extended mix of "Run 2" with additional beats by Afrika Islam and an alternate 'minus' mix of "MTO" by Mike "Hitman" Wilson appear as B-sides on the 12" version of the single.

== Artwork ==
Peter Saville designed the cover of the single to parody the design of laundry powder packaging. The tiny print on the back of the sleeve says, "Cover by Peter Saville Associates after Bold."

== Lawsuit ==
In 1990, John Denver's publishing company, Cherry Hill Music, filed a lawsuit against Universal Music Publishing, alleging that the guitar break in "Run 2" too closely resembled Denver's "Leaving on a Jet Plane". Denver was allegedly unaware of the lawsuit while it took place. The case was settled out of court, with their agreement stating that New Order should never re-release "Run 2" in its original form. The song has since been credited to New Order and John Denver.

== Track listing ==
7": FAC 273-7 (UK)
No.	Title	Writer(s)	Length
1.	"Run 2" (Remixed by Scott Litt)	John Denver, Gillian Gilbert, Peter Hook, Stephen Morris and Bernard Sumner	3:45
2.	"MTO" (Remixed by Mike 'Hitman' Wilson)	Gilbert, Hook, Morris, Sumner	3:43

12": FAC 273-12 (UK)
No.	Title	Writer(s)	Length
1.	"Run 2" (Remixed by Scott Litt)	Denver, Gilbert, Hook, Morris, Sumner	3:45
2.	"Run 2" (extended version) (Remixed by Scott Litt)	Denver, Gilbert, Hook, Morris, Sumner	5:22
3.	"MTO" (Remixed by Mike 'Hitman' Wilson)	Gilbert, Hook, Morris, Sumner	3:43
4.	"MTO" (Minus Mix) (Remixed by Mike 'Hitman' Wilson)	Gilbert, Hook, Morris, Sumner	5:24

== Chart positions ==
Chart (1989)	Peak position
UK Singles Chart	49
UK Independent Singles Chart	1

== Video ==
The video was directed by the photographer / filmmaker Robert Frank and produced by Michael Shamberg. The band was filmed in Los Angeles, while the street scenes are in New York City featuring the British actor David Warrilow.
