= Technique (album) =

Studio album by New Order
- Released: 30 January 1989
- Recorded: 1988
- Studios: Mediterranean, Ibiza; Real World, Box
- Genres: Alternative rock; acid house; dance-rock; electronic dance
- Length: 39:32
- Label: Factory
- Producer: New Order

New Order chronology
Substance (1987)	Technique (1989)	Republic (1993)

Singles from Technique
- 1. "Fine Time" Released: 28 November 1988; 2. "Round and Round" Released: 27 February 1989; 3. "Run 2" Released: 28 August 1989

Technique is the fifth studio album by English rock band New Order. Released on 30 January 1989 by Factory Records, the album was partly recorded on the island of Ibiza, and incorporates Balearic beat and acid house influences into the group's dance-rock sound. The album was influenced by the then growing acid scene, and Sumner's experiences at Shoom in London.

Technique was the first New Order album to reach number one on the UK charts, and "Fine Time", the first single from the album, reached number 11. Remixed versions of "Round & Round" and "Run" were also released as singles.

== Background and recording ==
In the late 1980s, the band felt that they had to keep on playing with dance-electronic rhythms. Bernard Sumner reflected; "We were in this position of being known for this dance-electronic sound and it would have been daft to have just stopped doing it. That was the nature of the time. The way I saw it was we were still writing band music as well, so we'd reached a compromise." Peter Hook joked that the album was "an epic power struggle between the sequencers and me. I was resisting it valiantly, because I still wanted us to be a rock band."

Sumner wrote all of the lyrics. When recording on the island of Ibiza, the band was heavily influenced by the environment around them and became fascinated by Balearic club music. Gillian Gilbert recalled, "We had Mike (Johnson, engineer) with us, so there was always somebody doing something, but it was the beginning of us not being together in the studio when we were doing things. It was like, 'oh you do your drums today, and I'll do the vocals tonight...' The songs were sort of there but there were huge chunks missing. You'd leave blocks and say, 'will you fill that in? I'm off now.'" The band had chosen to record in Ibiza at Hook's urging after a series of records made in "dark and horrible" London studios. Stephen Morris described the sound of the Balearic beat clubs on the island they began to visit as "mad! They'd put an acid record on and then the next one would be a Queen one—it was schizophrenic, really. It'd be something really Spanish and then something really daft. It was a really odd mix but it all seemed to make sense when you were there. I don't know why that was. Maybe because we were all a bit out of our brains."

Following four months spent in Ibiza (with the album "20% complete", according to Sumner), the band shifted to Peter Gabriel's Real World Studios in Wiltshire to finish recording, which Sumner referred to as a "much more sober atmosphere".

== Release and promotion ==
To promote the album, music videos were produced for the three singles. An instrumental version of "Vanishing Point" was used at the time on the BBC series Making Out.

John Denver's publishing company later filed a lawsuit, alleging that the guitar break in "Run" too closely resembled Denver's "Leaving on a Jet Plane". The case was settled out of court.

== Music ==
For Hook, "Technique [is] not an Ibizan dance record. I think it catches a summer sound really brilliantly." Morris mentioned that the album had an "end of term, last day of school feel about it". According to Andrew Gaerig of Pitchfork: "Thirty-three at the time of its release, singer Bernard Sumner aims his always-dopey lyrics at a lackadaisical peace of mind, having dropped any pretense of being dangerous or sexy (two things he never was anyway)."

== Reception ==
Professional ratings
Review scores
Source	Rating
AllMusic	4.5/5 stars
The A.V. Club	B+
Blender	4/5 stars
Los Angeles Times	3/4 stars
NME	9/10
Pitchfork	9.2/10
Q	5/5 stars
Rolling Stone	3/5 stars
The Rolling Stone Album Guide	4.5/5 stars
The Village Voice	B+

Technique received generally positive reviews from music critics upon its release. Chris Roberts of Melody Maker hailed the album as "a rare and ravishing triumph", while John Tague of NME wrote that the band had "fashioned an LP of unflinching honesty, free from the masks of false identities of their past." The Village Voice's Robert Christgau called New Order a "lot franker and happier (hence smarter) than Depeche Mode" and felt that the band had "lightened up". Los Angeles Times critic Craig Lee wrote that "with the exception of 'Fine Time,' there may be little new ground broken here, but when it comes to the sound of a broken psyche, New Order never misses a beat." Ira Robbins, in his review for Rolling Stone, stated that Technique "delivers a solid blast of sonic presence with immaculate playing" and called it a "surprisingly inviting album from this generally reserved outfit".

Technique has since garnered critical acclaim in retrospective reviews. John Bush of AllMusic referred to the album as "another classic record" by New Order and stated that their "instincts for blending rock and contemporary dance resulted in another confident, superb LP." Spin magazine's 1995 Alternative Record Guide cited Technique as New Order's best album because it represented the perfect synthesis of the band's abilities as a punk-influenced rock band and as synthpop pioneers. David Quantick of Uncut called it a "powerfully contradictory album: not only is it an Ibiza record that's New Order's least techno-ey, but it's a chirpy, upbeat album with mature lyrics". The A.V. Club's Josh Modell referred to Technique as New Order's "last truly great album", as did BBC Music's Ian Wade, who added that the album showed "a New Order ready for the next decade, adding to their already superb reputation." Keith Gwillim of Stylus Magazine contended that New Order "may have made better records, but none of them defines them, sounds so quintessentially like what they were always reaching for, quite as well as Technique."

Tom Ewing of Pitchfork labelled Technique "magnificent" in 2008 and stated that the album "takes the easy interplay and full-band sound of Brotherhood and drenches it in good Ibiza vibes". However, he criticised the Collector's Edition bonus material as containing only "listless B-sides and instrumentals, and merely functional remixes".

Technique has been listed by several publications as one of the best albums of the 1980s and of all time. In 2006, Q magazine placed the album at number 21 on its list of the "40 Best Albums of the '80s". NME ranked the album at number 122 on its list of the 500 greatest albums of all time in 2013. The album is also included in Robert Dimery's book 1001 Albums You Must Hear Before You Die.

== Track listing ==
All tracks are written by New Order, except where indicated.

Side one
No.	Title	Length
1.	"Fine Time"	4:42
2.	"All the Way"	3:22
3.	"Love Less"	2:58
4.	"Round & Round"	4:29
5.	"Guilty Partner"	4:44

Side two
No.	Title	Length
1.	"Run" (John Denver, Sumner, Gilbert, Hook, Morris)	4:29
2.	"Mr. Disco"	4:20
3.	"Vanishing Point"	5:15
4.	"Dream Attack"	5:13
Total length:		39:32

2008 Collector's Edition bonus disc
No.	Title	Writer(s)	Length
1.	"Don't Do It"		4:34
2.	"Fine Line"		4:45
3.	"Round & Round" (12" Version)		6:52
4.	"Best & Marsh"		4:32
5.	"Run 2" (extended version)	New Order, John Denver	5:26
6.	"MTO" (Minus Mix)		5:27
7.	"Fine Time" (Silk Mix)		6:19
8.	"Vanishing Point" (Instrumental Making Out Mix)		5:12
9.	"World in Motion" (Carabinieri Mix)	New Order, Keith Allen	5:52
Total length:			48:53

== Personnel ==
New Order

- Bernard Sumner – vocals, guitars, melodica, synthesisers and programming
- Peter Hook – 4- and 6-stringed bass, electronic percussion
- Stephen Morris – drums, synthesisers and programming
- Gillian Gilbert – synthesisers, guitars and programming

Technical

- New Order – production
- Michael Johnson – engineer
- Richard Chappell – assistant engineer
- Aaron Denson – assistant engineer
- Richard Evans – assistant engineer
- Trevor Key – cover design
- Alan Meyerson – mixing
- Peter Saville – cover design

== Charts ==
=== Weekly charts ===
Weekly chart performance for Technique
Chart (1989)	Peak position
Australian Albums (ARIA)	25
Canada Top Albums/CDs (RPM)	21
Dutch Albums (Album Top 100)	57
European Albums (Music & Media)	7
Finnish Albums (Suomen virallinen lista)	29
German Albums (Offizielle Top 100)	25
Icelandic Albums (Tónlist)	3
New Zealand Albums (RMNZ)	11
Swedish Albums (Sverigetopplistan)	23
Swiss Albums (Schweizer Hitparade)	15
UK Albums (Official Charts)	1
UK Independent Albums (MRIB)	1
US Billboard 200	32

=== Year-end charts ===
Year-end chart performance for Technique
Chart (1989)	Position
Canada Top Albums/CDs (RPM)	83
UK Albums (Gallup)	89

== Certifications ==
Certifications for Technique
Region	Certification	Certified units/sales
Brazil (Pro-Música Brasil)	Gold	100,000^{*}
Canada (Music Canada)	Gold	50,000^{^}
United Kingdom (BPI)	Gold	100,000^{^}
United States (RIAA)	Gold	500,000^{^}
^{*} Sales figures based on certification alone.^{^} Shipments figures based on certification alone.

== Sources ==
- Hook, Peter (2009). The Hacienda: How Not to Run a Club. London: Simon & Schuster. ISBN 978-1-8473-9177-3.
