= 1981–1982 (EP) =

EP by New Order
- Released: November 1982
- Recorded: 1981–1982
- Genre: Post-punk
- Length: 29:49
- Label: Factory
- Producer: Martin Hannett; New Order

New Order chronology
| Movement (1981) | 1981–1982 (1982) | Power, Corruption & Lies (1983) |

1981–1982 (also often known by the catalog numbers "Factus 8" and "1981-Factus 8-1982") is a five-track extended play (EP) released by the English rock band New Order in November 1982 through Factory Records. It consists entirely of previously released singles, being the tracks "Procession", "Everything's Gone Green", and "Temptation", as well as two of their B-sides, "Mesh" and "Hurt". The EP was New Order's last release to contain production from Martin Hannett, who stopped working with the band during recording sessions for "Everything's Gone Green" due to creative disputes.

All tracks from 1981–1982 were featured on the 2008 Collector's Edition of New Order's first studio album, Movement (1981). The EP was officially reissued on Black Friday 2014 as part of a Record Store Day event.

== Overview ==
1981–1982 was put together for the American market as a compilation of three of New Order's early singles. It contains "Procession" (September 1981), plus the 12" versions of "Everything's Gone Green" (December 1981) and "Temptation" (May 1982), as well as their B-sides, "Mesh" and "Hurt", respectively. A second B-side to "Everything's Gone Green", "Cries and Whispers" is omitted, as is New Order's first single, "Ceremony" / "In a Lonely Place". Graphic designer Peter Saville designed the EP's sleeve and used a painting made by his then-girlfriend Martha Ladly.

1981–1982 also documents the band's break from producer Martin Hannett, who had produced Movement and both of Joy Division's studio albums. While Hannett produced "Everything's Gone Green", "Procession", and "Mesh", the remaining songs on the EP were produced by New Order. Bernard Sumner remarked: "Martin's last track was "Everything's Gone Green" – [in] fact he walked out halfway through the mix because Hooky and me asked him to turn the drums up".

== Critical reception ==
Professional ratings
Review scores
| Source | Rating |
|---|---|
| AllMusic | 3/5 stars |
| Robert Christgau | B+ |

The Village Voice critic Robert Christgau described the EP's version of "Temptation" as being "where Manchester's finest stop hearing ghosts and stake their claim to a danceable pop of unprecedented grimness and power," noting that it was "the first real song this sharp-cornered sound-and-groove band has ever come up with."

== Reissue of EP tracks ==
All of the tracks from 1981–1982 were eventually re-released on the bonus CD of the 2008 Collector's Edition of Movement, and other tracks from the same period. A remastered version of the EP was reissued as a 12" vinyl in 2014, as part of Record Store Day's 2014 Black Friday event.

== Track listing ==
All tracks are written by Gillian Gilbert, Peter Hook, Stephen Morris, and Bernard Sumner.

Side A
| No. | Title | Length |
|---|---|---|
| 1. | "Everything's Gone Green" | 5:30 |
| 2. | "Procession" | 4:27 |
| 3. | "Mesh" | 3:02 |

Side B
| No. | Title | Length |
|---|---|---|
| 1. | "Temptation" | 8:47 |
| 2. | "Hurt" | 8:03 |

Notes

- Track listing adapted from the 2014 remaster.
- A late-1980s Canadian issue of the EP on CD (catalog number: FEP 313) reverses the original side sequence, beginning with "Temptation" and ending with "Mesh".

== Personnel ==
New Order

- Bernard Sumner – vocals, guitars, melodica, synthesisers. programming
- Peter Hook – 4- and 6-stringed bass
- Gillian Gilbert – synthesizers, programming, guitars
- Stephen Morris – drums, synthesisers, programming

Technical

- Martin Hannett – production (tracks 1–3)
- Chris Nagle – engineering
- John and Flood – assistant engineering

== Charts ==
Chart performance for 1981–1982
| Chart (1983–1984) | Peak position |
|---|---|
| New Zealand Albums (RMNZ) | 4 |
| UK Independent Albums (MRIB) | 4 |
