= Waiting for the Sirens' Call (song) =

2005 single by New Order

Single by New Order

from the album Waiting for the Sirens' Call
- Released: 26 September 2005
- Genre: Alternative rock
- Length: 5:42 (album version); 3:52 (single version)
- Label: Warner
- Songwriters: Bernard Sumner, Peter Hook, Stephen Morris, Phil Cunningham
- Producers: New Order, Jim Spencer

New Order singles chronology
"Jetstream" (2005)	"Waiting for the Sirens' Call" (2005)	"Guilt Is a Useless Emotion" (2005)

"Waiting for the Sirens' Call" is a single released in 2005 by English band New Order. It was released by London Records on 26 September 2005, and was the third single from the album of the same title.

== Cover ==
The cover image is a 1954 Eliot Elisofon photo of a nude woman in Tahiti, French Polynesia, seated in a river and placing a flower in her hair.

== Track listings ==
All tracks are written by New Order.

7" #1: NUO15V1 (UK & Europe)
No.	Title	Length
1.	"Waiting for the Sirens' Call" (Rich Costey Radio Edit)	3:52
2.	"Temptation" (Secret Machines Remix)	4:37

7" #2: NUO15V2 (UK & Europe)
No.	Title	Length
1.	"Waiting for the Sirens' Call" (Band Mix)	3:53
2.	"Everything's Gone Green" (Cicada Remix)	4:33

7" #3: NUO15V3 (UK & Europe)
No.	Title	Length
1.	"Waiting for the Sirens' Call" (Jacknife Lee Remix Edit)	4:11
2.	"Bizarre Love Triangle" (Richard X Remix Edit)	4:19

CD: NUOCD15 (UK & Europe)
No.	Title	Length
1.	"Waiting for the Sirens' Call" (Rich Costey Remix)	5:39
2.	"Waiting for the Sirens' Call" (Jacknife Lee Remix)	6:10

CDR: Warner Bros. promo
No.	Title	Length
1.	"Bizarre Love Triangle" (Richard X Remix Full Length)	7:05
2.	"Everything's Gone Green" (Cicada Remix)	4:35
3.	"Everything's Gone Green" (Martin Buttrich Remix)	4:56
4.	"Temptation" (Secret Machines remix full length)	7:26
5.	"Waiting for the Sirens' Call" (Jacknife Lee Remix Edit)	4:11

- Includes exclusive mix by Martin Buttrich (Timo Maas' engineer) as well as exclusive full length cuts of two other mixes.

== Chart positions ==
Chart (2005)	Peak position
UK Singles Chart	21
