= Movement (New Order album) =

- Original vinyl cover

Studio album by New Order
- Released: 13 November 1981
- Recorded: 24 April–4 May 1981
- Studios: Strawberry, Stockport
- Genres: Post-punk; New Wave
- Length: 35:20
- Label: Factory
- Producer: Martin Hannett

New Order chronology
Movement (1981)	1981–1982 (1982)

Movement is the debut studio album by the English rock band New Order, released on 13 November 1981 by Factory Records. Recorded in the wake of Joy Division frontman Ian Curtis' suicide the previous year, the album is a continuation of the dark post-punk sound of Joy Division's material, increasing the use of synthesizers while still being predominantly rooted in rock. At the time of its release, the album was not particularly well received by critics or audiences, only peaking at number thirty on the UK Albums Chart; the band would gradually shift to a more electronic sound over the course of the next year.

In the decades since its release, retrospective critical reception has been very positive, with reviewers praising the album as a middle ground between the band's work as Joy Division and their subsequent alternative dance material. Slant Magazine placed the album at number 42 on its list of the "Best Albums of the 1980s", saying it "exists almost exactly in between Joy Division's post-punk sound and the synth-pop style that would come to define New Order and influence pop music for decades".

== Recording ==
After the suicide of Joy Division's singer Ian Curtis in May 1980, and the subsequent shock for those surrounding him, remaining members Bernard Sumner, Peter Hook, and Stephen Morris elected to carry on, albeit under a new name – New Order. With the exception of two songs, "Ceremony" (first played live at Joy Division's last gig, a little over two weeks before Curtis's death) and "In a Lonely Place" (unreleased, but demoed in the studio), all the material played would be new.

A couple of songs on Movement stem from the initial songwriting session the band undertook in the summer of 1980. "Dreams Never End" and "Truth" were both played at the initial New Order concerts (still played as a trio) in the US that September. At this point it was still undecided as to who should be vocalist. The interim solution was that all three members took turns at singing before finally deciding that Bernard Sumner should take the main vocalist's role with Peter Hook as back-up (though he sang lead on "Dreams Never End" and "Doubts Even Here"). The introduction in October 1980 of Gillian Gilbert, Stephen Morris's girlfriend, lightened the burden on Sumner who had to play guitar and keyboards and sing (something he found impossible to do simultaneously) and enabled the band to pursue a more electronic approach. Subsequently, the remainder of the songs that appeared on Movement were written and then recorded over a seven-month period "in two big bits, and a whole lot of little bits", according to Sumner, as well as "Mesh", "Cries and Whispers" (both early live staples and used as B-sides), "Procession" and "Everything's Gone Green", the latter forming a non-album single released as FAC53 in September 1981.

The producer of the album was once again Martin Hannett, who had worked with them as Joy Division; however, the rapport between producer and band had in the ensuing time eroded. Hannett was in a legal dispute with Factory Records and suffering from substance and alcohol abuse, and the band members—themselves still coming to terms with having to write and arrange songs without Curtis's ear and lyric-writing ability—found him uncooperative. It would be the last album that they worked on together, with Hannett walking out on the band during the production of "Everything's Gone Green".

== Sound ==
Musically, Movement is a transitional album. References to Ian Curtis appear on the song "ICB" (an initialism for 'Ian Curtis Buried', as confirmed by Peter Hook in a 2013 interview) Keith Gwyllim of Stylus Magazine described it: "Most of Movement is filled with droning post-punk dirges shot through with veins of electro-pop and primitive dub-sounding experiments. For all intents and purposes, an extension of the final recorded songs of Joy Division, such as "Isolation" and "Love Will Tear Us Apart".

In a questionnaire interview with the fanzine Artificial Life (No. 2, Nov. 1982), the band were asked if they were happy with the album to which they replied, "We were happy with the songs, not all happy with the production." Peter Hook later revealed, "We were confused musically ... Our songwriting wasn't coming together. I don't know how we pulled out of that one. I actually liked Movement, but I know why nobody else likes it. It was good for the first two-and-a-half minutes, then it dipped."

== Artwork ==
The album's cover was designed by Peter Saville and is based on a poster by the Italian Futurist Fortunato Depero.

The shape created by the top three lines is an 'F' (lying on its back), which refers to Factory Records/Factory Communications Limited and the bottom two lines create an 'L' (lying on its front), the Roman numeral 50, the original catalogue was FACT 50. The blue colour of the lines was chosen by the band; the first copies in the US had the same design in brown on an ivory background.

US vinyl (1981)

Canadian cassette (1981)

UK cassette (1986)

US CD, 1st pressing (1988)

== Reception and legacy ==
Professional ratings
Review scores
Source	Rating
AllMusic	3.5/5 stars
The A.V. Club	B−
Blender	5/5 stars
Entertainment Weekly	B
Pitchfork	9.3/10
Q	3/5 stars
The Rolling Stone Album Guide	3/5 stars
Select	3/5
Uncut	8/10
The Village Voice	B+

Released in November 1981—just weeks after the Joy Division retrospective/live double album Still—Movement was met with a tepid reception, with critics disappointed by what was perceived to be a lack of forward momentum after the "Ceremony" single. It is rumoured that the band considered either re-mixing or even entirely re-recording the album, but time and financial constraints prevented this. A new song called "Temptation" would provide the band with the necessary impetus and a new direction.

Retrospectively reviewed in the context of New Order's entire work, the album has been more positively received, with Uncut's Sharon O'Connell noting the "future-positive declaration" of the opener "Dreams Never End" and a "kind of confident, electronic pulsing" sound that would be further evident on the band's subsequent singles, and Pitchfork reviewer Tom Ewing calling it "their most coherent and underappreciated record". In 2025, Radio X included the album in its list of "The 25 best indie debut albums of the 1980s".

== Track listing ==
All tracks are written by Bernard Sumner, Peter Hook, Gillian Gilbert, and Stephen Morris, except where noted.

Movement track listing
No.	Title	Length
1.	"Dreams Never End"	3:13
2.	"Truth"	4:37
3.	"Senses"	4:45
4.	"Chosen Time"	4:07
5.	"ICB"	4:33
6.	"The Him"	5:29
7.	"Doubts Even Here"	4:16
8.	"Denial"	4:20
Total length:		35:20

2008 collector's edition bonus disc
No.	Title	Writer(s)	Length
1.	"Ceremony" (September 1981 version)	Ian Curtis, Bernard Sumner, Peter Hook, Stephen Morris (Joy Division)	4:23
2.	"Temptation" (7" version)		5:26
3.	"In a Lonely Place"	Curtis, Sumner, Hook, Morris	6:16
4.	"Everything's Gone Green"		5:30
5.	"Procession"		4:27
6.	"Mesh" (incorrectly labeled as "Cries and Whispers")		3:02
7.	"Hurt"		8:13
8.	"Cries and Whispers" (incorrectly labeled as "Mesh")		3:25
9.	"Ceremony" (January 1981 version)	Curtis, Sumner, Hook, Morris	4:39
10.	"Temptation" (12" version)		8:47
Total length:			54:08

=== 2019 Definitive Edition ===
A Definitive box set featuring a re-pressed vinyl LP and a digitally remastered CD of the original album was released on 5 April 2019. An additional CD of rare and unreleased demos from recording sessions for the album, including sessions recorded at Western Works Studios that were produced by Cabaret Voltaire and New Order, was included, as were a DVD of recorded live performances, and a hard-cover book reflecting on the making of the album.

Alongside the release of the set, repressings of 12" singles "Ceremony" (both January 1981 and September 1981 versions), "Everything's Gone Green", and "Temptation" were made available for individual purchase.

On 5 December 2025, Movement was reissued on CD featuring both the original album and the bonus disc found in the Definitive set, marking the first time any additional material from the Definitive series was available to purchase outside of the box set. Additionally, a Blu-ray audio edition of Movement featuring three mixes was released. The 2019 stereo remaster of the Definitive box set, a Dolby Atmos 5.1 surround sound stereo mix produced by Steven Wilson in 2024, alongside instrumental versions of the newly produced mixes.

2019 Definitive Edition bonus disc
No.	Title	Writer(s)	Length
1.	"Dreams Never End" (Western Works Demo)		3:40
2.	"Homage" (Western Works Demo)		4:13
3.	"Ceremony" (Western Works Demo)	Curtis, Sumner, Hook, Morris	4:38
4.	"Truth" (Western Works Demo)		5:26
5.	"Are You Ready for This?" (Western Works Demo)		2:49
6.	"The Him" (Cargo Demo)		4:53
7.	"Senses" (Cargo Demo)		4:10
8.	"Truth" (Cargo Demo)		4:38
9.	"Dreams Never End" (Cargo Demo)		3:23
10.	"Mesh" (Cargo Demo)		3:11
11.	"ICB" (Cargo Demo)		4:40
12.	"Procession" (Cargo Demo)		3:45
13.	"Cries and Whispers" (Cargo Demo)		2:49
14.	"Doubts Even Here" (Instrumental; Cargo Demo)		5:09
15.	"Ceremony" (1st Mix; Ceremony Sessions)	Curtis, Sumner, Hook, Morris	4:20
16.	"Temptation" (Alternative 7" Mix)		5:25
17.	"Procession" (Rehearsal Recording)		3:42
18.	"Chosen Time" (Rehearsal Recording)		4:40
Total length:			75:31

2019 Definitive Edition bonus DVD

Live at Hurrah's, NY, 1980
No.	Title	Writer(s)	Length
1.	"In a Lonely Place"	Curtis, Sumner, Hook, Morris	5:06
2.	"Procession"		3:38
3.	"Dreams Never End"		3:51
4.	"Mesh"		4:04
5.	"Truth"		5:50
6.	"Cries and Whispers"		3:27
7.	"Ceremony"	Curtis, Sumner, Hook, Morris	5:08

Live at the Peppermint Lounge, NY, 1981
No.	Title	Writer(s)	Length
1.	"In a Lonely Place"	Curtis, Sumner, Hook, Morris	5:56
2.	"Dreams Never End"		3:38
3.	"Chosen Time"		4:07
4.	"ICB"		5:12
5.	"Senses"		5:00
6.	"Denial"		5:07
7.	"Everything's Gone Green"		6:09
8.	"Hurt" (Instrumental)		5:27
9.	"Temptation"		10:22

Live at Granada Studios, Manchester, 1981
No.	Title	Length
1.	"Doubts Even Here"	4:10
2.	"The Him"	6:29
3.	"Procession"	4:08
4.	"Senses"	5:12
5.	"Denial"	6:34

Live at BBC Riverside, London, 1982
No.	Title	Writer(s)	Length
1.	"Temptation"		4:35
2.	"Chosen Time"		3:45
3.	"Procession"		4:04
4.	"Hurt" (Instrumental)		4:09
5.	"Senses"		4:23
6.	"Denial"		5:17
7.	"In a Lonely Place"	Curtis, Sumner, Hook, Morris	5:36

Extras
No.	Title	Writer(s)	Length
1.	"Ceremony" (Live at CoManCHE Student Union, Manchester, 1981)	Curtis, Sumner, Hook, Morris	4:34
2.	"In a Lonely Place" (Live at Masonic Temple, Toronto, 1981)	Curtis, Sumner, Hook, Morris	5:21
3.	"Temptation" (Live at Soul Kitchen, Newcastle, 1982)		7:20
4.	"Hurt" (Live at Le Palace, Paris, 1982)		6:50
5.	"Procession" (Live at Le Palace, Paris, 1982)		3:43
6.	"Chosen Time" (Live at Pennies, Norwich, 1982)		3:37
7.	"Truth" (Live at The Haçienda, Manchester, 1983)		4:22
8.	"ICB" (Live at First Avenue, Minneapolis, 1983)		5:10
Total length:			181:21

== Personnel ==
New Order

- Bernard Sumner – lead vocals, guitars, melodica, synthesisers and programming
- Peter Hook – 4- and 6-stringed bass, lead vocals ("Dreams Never End" and "Doubts Even Here") and backing vocals
- Gillian Gilbert – synthesisers and programming, guitars, spoken words ("Doubts Even Here")
- Stephen Morris – drums, synthesisers and programming

Technical

- Martin Hannett – production
- Chris Nagle – engineering
- John and Flood – assistants

== Release details ==
- UK 12" – Factory Records (FACT 50)
- UK cassette – Factory Records (FACT 50C)
- UK CD (1986 release) – Factory Records (FACD 50)
- US CD (1988 release) – Factory Records (FACTUS 50 CD)
- UK CD (1993 re-release) – London Records (520,018-2)

== Charts ==
Chart performance for Movement
Chart (1981–1982)	Peak position
New Zealand Albums (RMNZ)	8
UK Albums (Official Charts)	30
UK Independent Albums (MRIB)	1

2025 chart performance for Movement
Chart (2025)	Peak position
Hungarian Physical Albums (MAHASZ)	19

== See also ==
- New Order discography
