= World in Motion... =

1990 single by New Order

Single by New Order
- B-side: "The B-side" (1990); "Such a Good Thing" (2002)
- Released: 21 May 1990
- Studio: The Sol Mill (Berkshire, England)
- Genre: Synth-pop; dance
- Length: 4:30
- Label: Factory
- Songwriters: Keith Allen; Bernard Sumner; Peter Hook; Stephen Morris; Gillian Gilbert
- Producer: Stephen Hague

New Order singles chronology
"Run 2" (1989)	"World in Motion..." (1990)	"Regret" (1993)

"World in Motion..." is a song by English band New Order (performed with the England national football team, credited as ENGLANDneworder). The song is New Order's only number-one song on the UK Singles Chart. It was produced for the England national football team's 1990 FIFA World Cup campaign and features a guest rap by England footballer John Barnes and additional vocals by several members of the English team of 1990 and comedian Keith Allen, who co-wrote the lyrics.

Singer Bernard Sumner described the single to NME as "the last straw for Joy Division fans", noting how its upbeat sound had inverted their former band's famously gloomy image. The song was originally to be called "E for England", with lyrics that ran "E is for England, England starts with E / We'll all be smiling when we're in Italy", but the Football Association vetoed the title, realising that it sounded suspiciously like a reference to the drug ecstasy.

== Song ==
=== Origins ===
The Football Association's (FA) press officer at the time, David Bloomfield, who had been a fan of Joy Division, contacted Tony Wilson, the head of New Order's label Factory Records, with the suggestion that the band record a track for the forthcoming World Cup in Italy. Without any hesitation, Wilson agreed. Bloomfield had seen and heard England's previous World Cup tunes and thought them uniformly dull, with the possible exception of the 1970 single, "Back Home".

Bloomfield had been inspired by a track by Colourbox called "The Official Colourbox World Cup Theme", and he had noticed that the respected BBC Radio DJ John Peel occasionally played tracks by American football teams, deeming them good enough to play on his show without a hint of irony.

Watching television one night, Bloomfield found himself watching Best and Marsh, a concoction of football chat and action clips. When the credits ran at the end of the programme, he noticed that the theme music was provided by New Order. In a eureka-like moment, he knew in an instant that he needed to contact Wilson and get the ball rolling.

There was a minor standoff between the agent acting on behalf of the England squad and Wilson with Bloomfield acting to get the parties talking once more. The players were by no means all willing to get involved. They were of the view that World Cup records were all dire and many did not want to be associated with a band that few of them were familiar with.

== Recording ==
The recording session took place before the squad met up on the afternoon of 25 March 1990, prior to an international match at Wembley. The FA had requested members of the squad be involved in recording the song and six players turned up on the day; John Barnes, Peter Beardsley, Paul Gascoigne, Steve McMahon, Chris Waddle and Des Walker. On the day of the recording, the lyrics had yet to be finalised, with players, band members and others all collaborating on parts. There was a good mood in the studio as the players added their vocals to the backing track that New Order had put together. The FA placed no restrictions or indeed gave any guidance to New Order, although Bloomfield had warned that he did not want anything associated with hooliganism.

A plan to have each player take turns to sing a line of the rap verse was abandoned, and instead it was decided to audition each player to perform the rap in its entirety. John Barnes ended up being selected after Beardsley, Gascoigne, McMahon and Walker were all deemed unsuitable either due to their broad northern English accents or inability to keep the required rhythm. Waddle was not auditioned as Barnes was selected before he was trialled. As such, Barnes was the only player given a leading vocal on the song, the others being restricted to backing vocals.

The backing track for "World in Motion..." bore some similarities to the instrumental theme tune for the DEF II current affairs programme, Reportage, which had been written for the show by Stephen Morris and Gillian Gilbert of New Order. "World in Motion..." was produced by Stephen Hague, who had also produced one of the group's earlier hits, "True Faith". The single was released on 21 May 1990. It was New Order's last release on Factory Records.

The "They think it's all over" quotation, uttered by football commentator Kenneth Wolstenholme at the end of the 1966 World Cup Final, between England and West Germany, is utilised at the beginning and end of the track (though not the original; Wolstenholme re-recorded the phrase specially for the producers), and somewhat less known samples, such as "A beauty scored by Bobby Charlton" and "We Want Goals", are taken from Goal!, the official documentary film of the tournament of 1966; the voice is that of actor Nigel Patrick.

The squad with Allen shout "express yourself" in the verses and sing the refrain at the end; in the "Carabinieri mix" they are also heard providing backing vocals in the chorus.

=== John Barnes' rap ===
A rap is performed by England player John Barnes towards the end of the track. The song was not originally going to feature a rap; it was the brainchild of Keith Allen after he had been recruited to help inject some humour into the song in case of poor reception.

The rap verse has been described as the most memorable part of the original song. According to BBC News entertainment reporter Chris Leggett, Barnes's 1990 effort was the first time a footballer had managed a respectable performance in a World Cup song, all previous efforts having been marked by out-of-tune recordings and mimed performances on the likes of Top of the Pops. Writers such as Tom McGowan have claimed "even England fans who weren't alive in 1990" know the lyrics.

=== "The B-Side" ===
The single's B-side, an early version of the A-side, was titled "The B-Side", extending the football theme of the release. It was produced by former Swans member Roli Mosimann. Besides a different arrangement and some different lyrics, this version lacks the commentary samples and squad vocals, with Keith Allen's "naff football chants and JB impersonation" (as credited on the sleeve) in their place.

=== Remixes ===
Like "True Faith", "Fine Time" and "Round & Round" before it, the single was issued on two separate 12-inch singles, the first featuring the original mix of the song, the second containing reinterpretations by outside remixers. This would be the last New Order single released in this way until "Be a Rebel" in 2020/21. Remixers Andrew Weatherall and Terry Farley were supplied with an alternative chorus vocal, with the result that the chorus hook on their mixes runs "We've got the world in motion" rather than the original "Love's got the world in motion".

In 1996, LFO's Mark Bell remixed version of the song appeared on The Beautiful Game, which was released to tie in with Euro 96.

In 2010, one reworked version of the song was used in an advert for the Mars Bar. The A side features heavily in the film Butterfly Kiss; both the song itself is heard as well as the two main actresses singing versions of it.

=== Re-release ===
The single was re-released for the 2002 FIFA World Cup, this time with the track "Such a Good Thing" replacing "The B-Side". It failed to enter the UK Top 40. This version was planned to have David Beckham performing the rap, but the F.A. vetoed the idea. It was due to have been re-released again in remixed form for the 2006 FIFA World Cup, but despite a release date in the United Kingdom of 29 May 2006, a last-minute decision was taken to shelve this release and the remix has never surfaced. "Such a Good Thing" would be the final original New Order song to be released as a B-side, with all following singles simply including alternate mixes of the A-side and/or previously released tracks (typically in a remixed form).

=== Legacy ===
In 1998, New Order performed the song live for the first time at the Reading Festival with Allen. In the interim time Allen had written another England football song, the unofficial release "Vindaloo". Allen performed it with the band again at the Move Festival at the Old Trafford Cricket Ground in 2002, and in 2005 at Glastonbury.

John Barnes has occasionally revisited his rap during public appearances.

The song has often been compared to "Three Lions", with polls often conducted during England campaigns asking fans which song is better.

In July 2021, the song entered the UK Singles Chart again, charting at number 61 on the chart dated 9–15 July 2021.

== In popular media ==
The rap in the song was featured in a scene in series 2, episode 5 of the British sitcom Gavin & Stacey. In this scene, the character Neil "Smithy" Smith (James Corden) starts the rap when Gavin Shipman (Mathew Horne) opens the door to welcome Smithy to his home. Gavin then joins in the rap, followed by his father, Mick Shipman (Larry Lamb), and then his mother, Pam Shipman (Alison Steadman).

== Track listing ==
All tracks are written by Keith Allen, Gillian Gilbert, Peter Hook, Stephen Morris and Bernard Sumner; except where indicated.

12-inch 1: FAC 293 / 7-inch: FAC-7 293 / Cassette: FAC 293C (UK)
No.	Title	Length
1.	"World in Motion..."	4:30
2.	"World in Motion..." (The B-Side)	4:48

12-inch 2: FAC 293R (UK) / 12-inch: Qwest 9 21582-0 (US) / Cassette: 9 21582-4 (US)
No.	Title	Length
1.	"World in Motion..." (Subbuteo Mix) (Remixed by Graeme Park and Mike Pickering)	5:08
2.	"World in Motion..." (Subbuteo Dub) (Remixed by Graeme Park and Mike Pickering)	4:13
3.	"World in Motion..." (Carabinieri Mix) (Remixed by Andrew Weatherall and Terry Farley)	5:52
4.	"World in Motion..." (No Alla Violenza Mix) (Remixed by Andrew Weatherall and Terry Farley)	4:12

CD: FACD 293 (UK)
No.	Title	Length
1.	"World in Motion..."	4:30
2.	"World in Motion..." (The B-Side)	4:14
3.	"World in Motion..." (No Alla Violenza Mix) (Remixed by Andrew Weatherall and Terry Farley)	5:19
4.	"World in Motion..." (Subbuteo Mix) (Remixed by Graeme Park and Mike Pickering)	5:08

CD: Qwest 9 21582-2 (US)
No.	Title	Length
1.	"World in Motion..." (single mix)	4:30
2.	"World in Motion..." (The B-Side)	4:48
3.	"World in Motion..." (No Alla Violenza Mix) (Remixed by Andrew Weatherall and Terry Farley)	5:40
4.	"World in Motion..." (Subbuteo Mix) (Remixed by Graeme Park and Mike Pickering)	5:08

CD: Factory/MCA/Polygram 846 237-2 (Canada)
No.	Title	Length
1.	"World in Motion..."	4:32
2.	"World in Motion..." (No Alla Violenza Mix) (Remixed by Andrew Weatherall and Terry Farley)	5:41
3.	"World in Motion..." (Carabinieri Mix) (Remixed by Andrew Weatherall and Terry Farley)	5:56
4.	"World in Motion..." (Subbuteo Mix) (Remixed by Graeme Park and Mike Pickering)	5:10
5.	"World in Motion..." (Subbuteo Dub Mix) (Remixed by Graeme Park and Mike Pickering)	5:10
6.	"World in Motion..." (The B-Side)	4:49

Cassette: Factory/MCA/Polygram 846 237-4 (Canada)
No.	Title	Length
1.	"World in Motion..." (No Alla Violenza Mix) (Remixed by Andrew Weatherall and Terry Farley)	5:41
2.	"World in Motion..." (Carabinieri Mix) (Remixed by Andrew Weatherall and Terry Farley)	5:56
3.	"World in Motion..." (Subbuteo Mix) (Remixed by Graeme Park and Mike Pickering)	5:10
4.	"World in Motion..." (Subbuteo Dub Mix) (Remixed by Graeme Park and Mike Pickering)	5:10
5.	"World in Motion..." (The B-Side)	4:49

CD: NUOCD12 (UK) - 2002 release
No.	Title	Writer(s)	Length
1.	"World in Motion..."		4:30
2.	"Such a Good Thing" (Produced by New Order and Steve Osborne, BBC Radio 5 Live World Cup Theme)	New Order	4:10
3.	"World in Motion..." (No Alla Violenza Mix) (Remixed by Andrew Weatherall and Terry Farley)		4:12

== Charts ==
=== Weekly charts ===
1990 weekly chart performance for "World in Motion"
Chart (1990)	Peak position
Australia (ARIA)	21
Canada Dance/Urban (RPM)	3
Europe (Eurochart Hot 100 Singles)	2
Finland (Suomen virallinen lista)	4
Greece (IFPI)	3
Ireland (IRMA)	7
Luxembourg (Radio Luxembourg)	1
New Zealand (Recorded Music NZ)	8
Switzerland (Schweizer Hitparade)	27
UK Singles (Official Charts)	1
UK Indie (OCC)	1
US Alternative Airplay (Billboard)	5
US Dance Club Songs (Billboard)	10
US Dance Singles Sales (Billboard)	5
West Germany (GfK)	21

2002 weekly chart performance for "World in Motion"
Chart (2002)	Peak position
UK Singles (Official Charts)	43

2010 weekly chart performance for "World in Motion"
Chart (2010)	Peak position
UK Singles (Official Charts)	22

=== Year-end charts ===
Year-end chart performance for "World in Motion"
Chart (1990)	Position
Canada Dance/Urban (RPM)	37
Europe (Eurochart Hot 100 Singles)	52
UK Singles (Gallup)	9

== Certifications ==
Region	Certification	Certified units/sales
United Kingdom (BPI)	Gold	400,000^{^}
^{^} Shipments figures based on certification alone.
