= Round & Round (New Order song) =

Single by New Order

from the album Technique
- B-side: "Best & Marsh"
- Released: 27 February 1989
- Recorded: 1988
- Studio: Mediterranean Studios (Ibiza, Balearic Islands, Spain); Real World Studios (Box, Wiltshire, England)
- Genre: Synth-pop; dance-pop; disco; Detroit techno
- Length: 4:31 (LP version); 4:00 (7" version); 6:52 (12" version)
- Label: Factory (FAC 263)
- Songwriters: Gillian Gilbert; Peter Hook; Stephen Morris; Bernard Sumner
- Producers: New Order (All versions); Stephen Hague (7" version)

New Order singles chronology
"Fine Time" (1988)	"Round & Round" (1989)	"Run 2" (1989)

Music video
- "Round & Round" on YouTube

"Round & Round" is a song by the English band New Order from their fifth studio album Technique (1989). The song was written by band members Gillian Gilbert, Peter Hook, Stephen Morris and Bernard Sumner, and the album version was produced entirely by New Order. "Round & Round" was re-recorded for a single release, with Stephen Hague as co-producer.

Musically, it is one of the band's most dance-centred songs, with few guitar or bass lines. Like the majority of New Order songs, the song's title is not mentioned in its lyrics. "Round & Round" was selected as the second single from the album by Factory Records' Tony Wilson over the wishes of the band, who wanted to issue "Vanishing Point" instead.

== Background ==
The song is about New Order's then-souring relationship with Tony Wilson, the owner of Factory Records, which was the band's label at the time. On the documentary "New Order Story", Bernard Sumner discusses that he did not originally intend the song to be about Tony Wilson and the tension between Wilson and the group, but Sumner admits that growing tension between the two men ultimately was channelled into the song when it was being written.

== Release ==
=== Music video ===
The music video for "Round & Round" features a series of eight successive black-and-white head-and-shoulder shots of young, female models, casually sitting in front of a camera as it records them, with the women occasionally talking (though what they say is not heard in the video). Randomly intercut into the footage of the women are various colorized short clips of flowers or marbles.

During the filming of the various models, it was decided to film additional footage of one model (Patty Sylvia) for an alternative cut of the video that features only Sylvia and the brief one-second color intercuts. Veronica Webb is featured with a dreadlock hairstyle in the video. A very young Cynthia Bailey is also featured. Fabienne Terwinghe is the fourth model. Elaine Irwin is the last model shown.

=== Artwork ===
The artwork by Peter Saville mirrors the Technique album cover, but uses a different statue with a red or blue (depending on which version is owned) background. With the single following the New Order tradition of not including the title within the lyrics, the line "The picture you see is no portrait of me" was stickered on varying sleeves.

== Critical reception ==
Malu Halasa, reviewer of British music newspaper Record Mirror, found the track "flamboyant, eminently danceable" with sound of "traditional gem from the Joy Division / New Order period". In turn Simon Williams New Musical Express chided the song for lack of novelty. He wrote: "New Order haven't seriously affected my tender young hormones since "1963". And their latest evacuee from Technology unwittingly exacerbates this unsatisfying state of affairs, as the customary swathes of synths, rhythmic ribbons and bass bandages wrap themselves around a once-skeletal framework... I'm sure that it sounds great at le discotheque after 15 gallons of hyper-toxic, liver-sizzling Latvian lager, but what doesn't?".

== Official versions ==
The band recorded three versions:

- The album version (4:29), which appears on Technique, emphasizes drums and bass for a hard dance feel. It concludes with a cold ending in which the sequencers are run through phasers before then cutting out abruptly.
- The 7" version (4:00), co-produced by Stephen Hague, emphasizes the melody, synth pads, and vocals. It has a similar structure to the album version, but replaces the instrumental break with a repeat of the intro and fades out in conclusion. This is the version used in the music video. Bernard Sumner remarked in a radio interview with Terry Christian on Key 103 that he was not fond of the plethora of "Round & Round" remixes and named the 'Stephen Hague Radio-Remix' as his favourite.
- The 12" version (6:52) has a 2:45 intro sequence and stops cold before proceeding much as in the 7" version. It has a wash of synthesizers and a keyboard solo midway through the song. Also, the line "It makes me act like a child" repeats several times as the song ends. Instead of fading out like the 7" version, it ends in a manner closer to the original album version though less discordant.

These versions and other remixes were distributed on over twenty 7", 12", and CD single formats, many with exclusive artwork. "Round & Round" has also appeared in various forms on New Order compilations. In 1994, "Round & Round" was remixed once again by Stephen Hague with Mike 'Spike' Drake for the compilation (the best of) New Order. This version revised Hague's 1989 seven inch remix removing many of the echoed refrains.

== B-sides ==
The single's main B-side was an instrumental, "Best & Marsh", which was written as the theme for a Granada TV series of the same name, featuring footballers George Best and Rodney Marsh. The CD single also included an instrumental remix of "Vanishing Point", produced for the BBC drama series Making Out.

== Track listing and formats ==
All tracks are written by Gillian Gilbert, Peter Hook, Stephen Morris and Bernard Sumner.

7": FAC 263 (UK)
No.	Title	Length
1.	"Round & Round"	4:02
2.	"Best & Marsh"	3:34

12" #1: FAC 263 (UK)
No.	Title	Length
1.	"Round & Round"	6:52
2.	"Best & Marsh"	4:26

12" #2: FAC 263R (UK) - Round & Remix
No.	Title	Length
1.	"Round & Round" (Club Mix) (Remixed by Ben Grosse and Kevin Saunderson)	7:07
2.	"Round & Round" (Detroit Mix) (Remixed by Kevin Saunderson)	6:29

5" CD: FAC 263-12 (UK)
No.	Title	Length
1.	"Round & Round" (7" version)	4:02
2.	"Vanishing Point" (Instrumental Making Out Mix)	5:13
3.	"Round & Round" (12" version)	6:52
4.	"Best & Marsh"	3:34

3" CD: FACD 263R (UK) - Round & Remix
No.	Title	Length
1.	"Round & Round" (Club Mix) (Remixed by Ben Grosse and Kevin Saunderson)	7:07
2.	"Round & Round" (Remixed by Ben Grosse; not to be confused with "Round & Round" (12" version) 5" CD track 3 or 12" #1 track 1)	6:52
3.	"Round & Round" (Detroit Mix) (Remixed by Kevin Saunderson)	6:29

== Charts ==
=== Weekly charts ===
Chart (1989)	Peak position
Australia (ARIA)	67
Canada Top Singles (RPM)	81
Ireland (IRMA)	10
New Zealand (Recorded Music NZ)	13
UK Singles (Official Charts Company)	21
UK Independent Singles Chart	2
US Billboard Hot 100	64
US Alternative Songs (Billboard)	6
US Dance Club Songs (Billboard)	1
US Dance/Electronic Singles Sales (Billboard)	5
US Cashbox Top 100	54
