= The Other Two & You =

Studio album by the Other Two
- Released: 28 October 1993 (UK); 1 November 1994 (US)
- Recorded: 1991
- Studio: Higher Plane, Mayfair, and Real World
- Genre: Dance-pop
- Length: 42:47
- Label: CentreDate Co Ltd/London Records (Europe); Qwest/Reprise/Warner Bros. Records (US); 45140
- Producer: Gillian Gilbert, Stephen Morris, Stephen Hague

The Other Two chronology
The Other Two & You (1993)	Super Highways (1999)

Singles from The Other Two & You
- 1. "Tasty Fish" Released: 28 October 1991; 2. "Selfish" Released: November 1993; 3. "Innocence" Released: February 1995

The Other Two & You is the debut album by the Other Two, an electronic music group composed of Gillian Gilbert and Stephen Morris, better known as founders of the group New Order. It was recorded in 1991, but its official release was delayed until late 1993 due to the collapse of Factory Records. Early promo copies from Factory Records were released in 1992 and referred to as FACT-330. The album was re-released with additional remixes in January 2010 by LTM Recordings.

== Critical reception ==
Professional ratings
Review scores
Source	Rating
AllMusic	3.5/5 stars

The Guardian noted that "many of the 10 tracks could be mid-period New Order, with Gilbert's tremulous vocal substituting for Sumner's fragile tones."

== Track listing ==
- Written by Gillian Gilbert and Stephen Morris

Side one
No.	Title	Length
1.	"Tasty Fish"	3:47
2.	"The Greatest Thing"	3:39
3.	"Selfish"	4:09
4.	"Movin' On"	4:44
5.	"Ninth Configuration"	4:19

Side two
No.	Title	Length
6.	"Feel This Love"	4:26
7.	"Spirit Level"	3:51
8.	"Night Voice"	2:05
9.	"Innocence" (CD editions conclude with a minute of silence)	4:46
10.	"Loved It (The Other Track)" (only included on CD editions)	5:56

2010 bonus tracks
No.	Title	Length
11.	"Tasty Fish" (Pascal 12" mix)	5:16
12.	"Selfish" (That Pop mix)	5:29
13.	"The Greatest Thing" (Pascal mix)	3:31
14.	"Moving On" (Moby mix)	5:53
15.	"Tasty Fish" (Almond Slice mix)	4:26
16.	"Selfish" (Junior Style dub)	9:03

- Although "Loved It (The Other Track)" is not strictly a hidden track, it is separated from the preceding track by a silent pregap lasting a full minute.

== Personnel ==
- Gillian Gilbert - lead vocals, keyboards, guitar
- Stephen Morris - drums, percussion, keyboards
- Jeremy (Jez) Kerr – backing vocals and lyrics on "Tasty Fish"
- Andy Wroe – guitar on "Movin' On"
- John Jackson, Felix Kendall, Stuart James, Simon Gogerly, Yoyo, Noel Rafferty, Chris Potter, Richard Chappell – engineering
- Thomas Manss, Howard Wakefield @ Thomas Manss & Company – sleeve design
- Peter Saville – design consultant
- Neil Cooper, Craig McDean – photography

== Release history ==
Region	Date	Label	Format	Catalog
United Kingdom	November 1993	CentreDate Co Ltd/London	Compact disc	520028.2
United Kingdom	November 1993	CentreDate Co Ltd/London	Cassette	520028.4
United Kingdom	November 1993	CentreDate Co Ltd/London	LP	520028.1
United Kingdom	25 January 2010	LTM Recordings	Compact disc	LTMCD 2551
United States	November 1, 1994	Qwest Records	Compact disc	9 45140-2
United States	November 1, 1994	Qwest Records	Cassette	9 45140-4
