= Everything's Gone Green =

Single by New Order
- B-side: "Cries and Whispers"; "Mesh"
- Released: December 1981
- Genre: Post-punk; synth-pop; electronic
- Length: 5:33
- Label: Factory Benelux
- Songwriters: Gillian Gilbert; Peter Hook; Stephen Morris, Bernard Sumner
- Producer: Martin Hannett

New Order singles chronology
"Procession" (1981)	"Everything's Gone Green" (1981)	"Temptation" (1982)

Music video
- "Everything's Gone Green" on YouTube

"Everything's Gone Green" is the third single by the English rock band New Order, released in December 1981.

As usual per New Order and Joy Division's releases, the recording date and location of the music is not disclosed on the original sleeve. The single was originally released in Belgium on Factory Benelux and bears the catalogue number FBN8. The single was later released in New Zealand in 1982 and was made available in the UK through import copies.

The artwork was designed by Peter Saville with computer graphics on the cover designed by Stephen Morris and Gillian Gilbert.

== Recording and music ==
The song had already been released in an edited form, as a double A side with the song "Procession" in September 1981.

Two original songs, "Cries and Whispers" and "Mesh," are included as B-sides. Both have been commonly mistitled on New Order's releases, in part due to the titles not being part of the lyrics, a common trait of many New Order songs. On the original 1981 12" single, the track names of the B-sides are correctly identified on the label, but are printed in incorrect order on the sleeve; however, on some mid-80's reissues of the single, the tracks themselves are reversed, with "Mesh" playing first, thus matching the sleeve while being in conflict with the label. As a result, the songs were misidentified on subsequent releases: on both the printed material and the label, the titles are incorrectly swapped on the 1987 Substance compilation, as well as on the Everything's Gone Green 1990 CD single release, and the original 2008 two-disc "Collector's Edition" release of Movement. The 2002 CD box set Retro was the first release since the 1981-1982 compilation to use a correct title across its packaging, and in its liner notes, drummer Stephen Morris writes, "Cries and Whispers is a great revelation because everyone thinks it's called Mesh. But it isn't. It was mislabelled in 1987 and nobody ever noticed." Both the 2009 second release of the "Collector's Edition" of Movement (which corrected audio errors on the 2008 original) and the 2023 reissue of Substance use the correct titles, and for the 2019 12" single reissue of Everything's Gone Green, the sleeve art itself was altered to present the track names in the correct order, with "Cries and Whispers" listed before "Mesh."

Stephen Morris wrote the lyrics to "Cries and Whispers" and "Mesh", earning Morris the scorn of critic Julie Burchill ("Sixth form drivel"). The title "Cries and Whispers" is taken from the Ingmar Bergman film. Morris later wrote about the origin of the title for "Everything's Gone Green": "The song's title arrived spontaneously as we were programming the rhythm track at Pinky's. After a few hours of button stabbing, synth-chattering and drum bashing, I sat down on a rickety chair, rolled a joint and inhaled deeply. The weak sunlight was reflected off the glazing of the swimming baths opposite and diffused through the grease-smeared window of our room. Momentarily, the light seemed to me to take on a crystalline glow, giving the room an aquamarine haze. 'Everything's gone Green,' I observed. 'That's good, let's call it that then,' said Bernard, who hadn't noticed my Condor moment."

All three tracks were produced by Martin Hannett, the last that he would produce with Bernard Sumner, Peter Hook, and Stephen Morris. Hannett, who had previously produced Movement and both of Joy Division's studio albums, had a fractious relationship with the group, caused by his unorthodox techniques and the band's (especially Sumner's) desire to co-produce. Sumner remarked retrospectively that "Martin's last track was 'Everything's Gone Green' – fact he walked out halfway through the mix because Hooky and me asked him to turn the drums up."

== Availability ==
"Everything's Gone Green" and "Mesh" were rereleased the following year on the 1981–1982 EP, along with the tracks from the "Temptation" 12". The single was rereleased as a CD in 1990. All three tracks appeared on the cassette version of Substance in 1987 and were in remastered form on the 2008 collector's edition of the 1981 album Movement.

"Everything's Gone Green" appears on many of New Order's compilations; aside from Substance, the song appears in remixed form (by Dave Clarke) on 1995's The Rest of New Order, in both its original form and a live recording on 2002's Retro, in its 7" mix on 2005's Singles and in its 12" mix on the second disc of the 2008 collector's edition re-release of Movement.

The single was once again reissued in 2019 as promotion for the definitive edition reissue of Movement.

== Track listing ==
All tracks are written by Gillian Gilbert, Peter Hook, Stephen Morris and Bernard Sumner.

12": Factory Benelux FBN 8 (Benelux)
No.	Title	Length
1.	"Everything's Gone Green"	5:33
2.	"Cries and Whispers"	3:25
3.	"Mesh"	3:00
Total length:		11:58

== Charts ==
Chart (1981)	Peak position
New Zealand RIANZ Singles Chart	29
UK Independent Singles Chart	3
US Billboard Hot Dance Club Play	64
