= Waiting for the Sirens' Call =

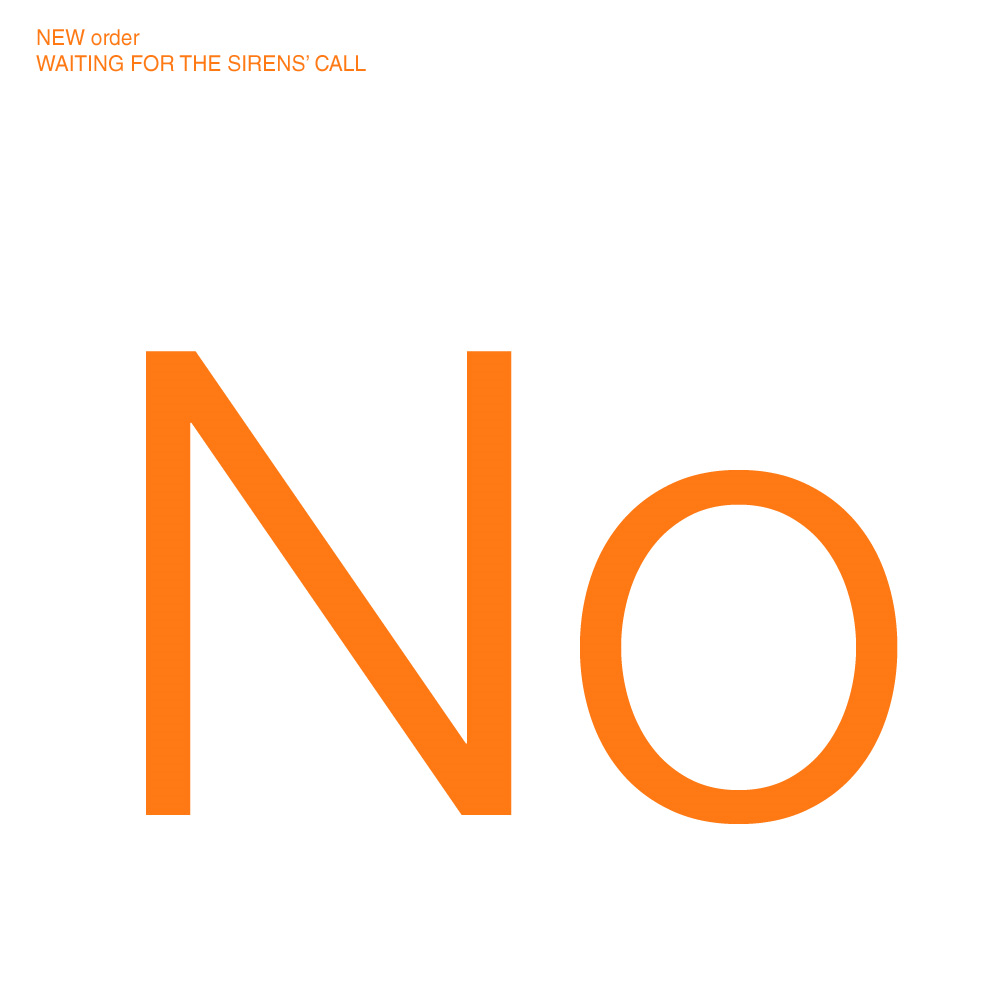

Studio album by New Order
- Released: 28 March 2005
- Recorded: 2003–2004
- Studio: Real World (Box, England); St Catherine's Court (Bath, England)
- Genre: Alternative rock; synth-pop
- Length: 57:07
- Label: London, Warner Bros.
- Producer: New Order; John Leckie; Stephen Street; Stuart Price

New Order chronology
Get Ready (2001)	Waiting for the Sirens' Call (2005)	Lost Sirens (2013)

Singles from Waiting for the Sirens' Call
- 1. "Krafty" Released: 7 March 2005; 2. "Jetstream" Released: 16 May 2005; 3. "Waiting for the Sirens' Call" Released: 19 September 2005; 4. "Guilt Is a Useless Emotion" Released: 16 November 2005 (promo launch and only in the US)

Waiting for the Sirens' Call is the eighth studio album by English rock band New Order, released on 28 March 2005 by London Records. The album was preceded by the single "Krafty". Two additional singles from the album were released: "Jetstream", which features vocals by Ana Matronic from Scissor Sisters, and the album's title track. This was the first studio album not to feature their the original lineup, as Gillian Gilbert had left the band in 2001 following the release of Get Ready.

== Reception ==
Professional ratings
Aggregate scores
Source	Rating
Metacritic	63/100
Review scores
Source	Rating
AllMusic	3/5 stars
Blender	3/5 stars
Entertainment Weekly	B+
The Guardian	3/5 stars
Mojo	2/5 stars
NME	6/10
Pitchfork	7.9/10
Q	2/5 stars
Rolling Stone	4/5 stars
Uncut	3/5 stars

According to Metacritic, the album received generally favourable reviews.

== Track listing ==
All tracks are written by New Order, except "Jetstream" written by New Order, Stuart Price and Ana Lynch.

Waiting for the Sirens' Call track listing
No.	Title	Length
1.	"Who's Joe?"	5:41
2.	"Hey Now What You Doing"	5:16
3.	"Waiting for the Sirens' Call"	5:42
4.	"Krafty"	4:33
5.	"I Told You So"	6:00
6.	"Morning Night and Day"	5:12
7.	"Dracula's Castle"	5:40
8.	"Jetstream"	5:23
9.	"Guilt Is a Useless Emotion"	5:39
10.	"Turn"	4:35
11.	"Working Overtime"	3:26

US edition bonus track

12. "Guilt Is a Useless Emotion" (Mac Quayle Vocal Mix) – 6:29

Japanese edition bonus tracks

12. "Krafty" (Japanese Version) – 4:33
13. "Krafty" (The Glimmers Twelve Inch Extended) – 6:55
14. "Krafty" (Phones Reality Remix) – 7:07

== Personnel ==
=== New Order ===
Musician credits for New Order are not listed in the liner notes of the album's personnel. Below are the instruments that the group typically plays.

- Bernard Sumner – vocals, guitars, synthesisers and programming
- Peter Hook – 4 and 6-stringed bass
- Stephen Morris – drums, synthesisers and programming
- Phil Cunningham – guitars, synthesisers and programming

=== Production ===
The original liner notes list the album's personnel as follows:

- New Order – producer, writer
- Jim Spencer – producer (1, 3, 5)
- Stephen Street – producer (2, 6, 10, 11), mixing (2, 6, 10, 11)
- Cenzo Townshend – mixing (2, 6, 10, 11), engineer (2, 6, 10, 11)
- Rich Costey – mixing (4)
- Dawn Zee – additional vocals (5, 9)
- John Leckie – producer (7), mixing (7)
- Stuart Price – producer (8, 9), writer (8)
- Ana Matronic – featuring (vocals) (8), writer (8)
- Beatrice Hatherley – additional vocals (9)
- Mac Quayle – keyboards, additional programming
- Bruno Ellingham – additional engineering
- Tom Stanley, Paul Grady, Claire Lewis, Marco Migliari, Rob Haggett, Phil Rose and Owen Skinner – assistant engineer
- Peter Saville – art direction, photography
- Anna Blessman – photography
- Howard Wakefield and Peter Saville Associates – design

== Charts ==
=== Weekly charts ===
Weekly chart performance for Waiting for the Sirens' Call
Chart (2005)	Peak position
Australian Albums (ARIA)	15
Austrian Albums (Ö3 Austria)	38
Belgian Albums (Ultratop Flanders)	32
Belgian Albums (Ultratop Wallonia)	21
Canadian Albums (Nielsen SoundScan)	29
Danish Albums (Hitlisten)	24
Dutch Albums (Album Top 100)	52
European Albums (Billboard)	6
Finnish Albums (Suomen virallinen lista)	34
French Albums (SNEP)	22
German Albums (Offizielle Top 100)	14
Irish Albums (IRMA)	19
Italian Albums (FIMI)	37
Japanese Albums (Oricon)	21
New Zealand Albums (RMNZ)	19
Norwegian Albums (VG-lista)	11
Scottish Albums (Official Charts)	5
Spanish Albums (Promusicae)	45
Swedish Albums (Sverigetopplistan)	7
Swiss Albums (Schweizer Hitparade)	44
UK Albums (Official Charts)	5
US Billboard 200	46
US Top Dance Albums (Billboard)	1

=== Year-end charts ===
Year-end chart performance for Waiting for the Sirens' Call
Chart (2005)	Position
US Top Dance/Electronic Albums (Billboard)	13

== Certifications and sales ==
Certifications and sales for Waiting for the Sirens' Call
Region	Certification	Certified units/sales
United Kingdom (BPI)	Silver	60,000^{*}
United States	—	84,000
^{*} Sales figures based on certification alone.
