= Doubts Even Here =

Song by New Order

from the album Movement
- Released: 13 November 1981
- Recorded: November 1981; Strawberry Studios; (Stockport, United Kingdom)
- Genre: Post-punk; gothic rock; dark wave; new wave
- Length: 4:16
- Label: Factory
- Songwriters: Bernard Sumner; Peter Hook; Stephen Morris; Gillian Gilbert
- Producer: Martin Hannett

"Doubts Even Here", originally called "Tiny Tim", is the seventh track of eight on New Order's debut album Movement, released on November 13, 1981. After the death of Joy Division singer Ian Curtis, the remaining members formed New Order with drummer Stephen Morris's girlfriend Gillian Gilbert joining five months later. This led to all three male members attempting vocals.

"Doubts Even Here" and "Dreams Never End" on Movement are sung by bassist Peter Hook with spoken contributions by Gillian Gilbert. The song starts off with an array of electronic percussion noises before slow synth and bass riffs enter, which eventually pick up speed later in the song. The lyrics were written by Stephen Morris. The song has not been performed live since a few performances in 1981.

== Versions ==
=== Official versions ===
- Album version – 4:16

=== Remixes ===
- "Doubts Even Here" (Razed Club Mix) (unofficial remix by Razed in a New Division of Agony) – 4:32
