= The Other Two (duo) =

English dance act

- Origin: Macclesfield, Cheshire, England
- Genres: Synth-pop, alternative dance
- Years active: 1990–present
- Labels: Factory; London; LTM; Qwest/Reprise/Warner Bros. (US)
- Spinoff of: New Order
- Members: Gillian Gilbert; Stephen Morris

The Other Two are an English dance band consisting of husband-and-wife Stephen Morris and Gillian Gilbert, who are both from New Order. The band name refers to the fact that the other New Order members, Bernard Sumner and Peter Hook, had already embarked on side projects by the time the first the Other Two record was released. Their debut single "Tasty Fish" was released in 1991 and peaked at No. 41 on the UK Singles Chart.

The Other Two have released two albums, The Other Two & You (1993) and Super Highways (1999).

== Albums ==
=== The Other Two & You ===
Initially conceived from the remnants of unused soundtrack work and various studio experiments, the Other Two began during a hiatus in New Order activity. They decided to feature a female vocalist, and in early stages Kim Wilde was recruited as a potential singer for the group. Ultimately however, Gilbert would take over on vocals, and performs on both Other Two albums.

Lead single "Tasty Fish" was released in 1991 to positive reviews. However, due to the collapse of Factory Records, The Other Two & You could not be released as initially planned. The release of New Order's Republic in the meantime meant that The Other Two & You was delayed until November 1993, finally being released on London Records. "Selfish" was chosen as a second single, and "Innocence" was also released as a club 12-inch in the US.

=== Super Highways ===
A follow-up album, Super Highways was released by London in March 1999. The album featured guest vocalist and co-writer Melanie Williams from dance act Sub Sub on selected tracks ("You Can Fly", "One Last Kiss", "Super Highways").

== Soundtracks ==
The Other Two have been involved in motion picture scoring; particularly TV soundtracks. Most notably they created a theme song for the TV series Common as Muck (the track "New Horizons" has elements of this theme tune), as well as the theme for America's Most Wanted. Other soundtrack work includes the series Cold Feet, Making Out and series two of Cracker. The Other Two also created music for the UK TV programme Reportage, although this was credited as New Order and would be adapted into their 1990 World Cup song "World in Motion."

== Other work ==
Morris and Gilbert reportedly considered assembling a third album around 2010 from other production work, although this did not materialise. The name was also used for Morris and Gilbert's 2014 remix of a Tim Burgess track. In 2022, the duo did a remix of a LoneLady track, "(There Is) No Logic".

== Discography ==
The Other Two discography
- Studio albums: 2
- Singles: 6

=== Albums ===
| Year | Album details | Chart positions |
| Year | Album details | US Heat. |
|---|---|---|
| 1993 | The Other Two & You: Released: November 1993; Label: London (UK), Qwest (US) | 40 |
| 1999 | Super Highways: Released: June 1999; Label: London | – |

=== Singles ===
| Year | Title | Chart positions | | | | Album |
| Year | Title | UK | AUS | US Club Play | US Modern Rock | Album |
|---|---|---|---|---|---|---|
| 1990 | "Loved It (The New Factory)" (limited non-commercial release) (as Steve and Gillian) | – | – | – | – | The Other Two & You |
| 1991 | "Tasty Fish" | 41 | 84 | – | – | The Other Two & You |
| 1993 | "Selfish" | 46 | – | 6 | 30 | The Other Two & You |
| 1995 | "Innocence" (released only in the US) | – | – | – | – | The Other Two & You |
| 1999 | "You Can Fly" (withdrawn shortly before release) | – | – | – | – | Super Highways |
| 1999 | "Super Highways" | – | – | – | – | Super Highways |
| 2011 | Anna + Peter Swing Project 1 (as Gillian + Stephen) | – | – | – | – | – |
