= Super Highways =

Studio album by The Other Two
- Released: June 14, 1999 (UK); July 28, 1999 (Japan)
- Recorded: Higher Plane and The Wool Hall; Mixed at Olympic and The Townhouse
- Genre: Dance-pop
- Length: 56:24
- Label: London Records (UK and Europe); East West Japan (Japan)
- Producer: Gillian Gilbert, Stephen Morris, Tim Oliver

The Other Two chronology
The Other Two & You (1993)	Super Highways (1999)

Singles from Super Highways
- 1. "You Can Fly" Released: February 22, 1999 (Withdrawn shortly before release); 2. "Super Highways" Released: June 7, 1999

Professional ratings
Review scores
Source	Rating
AllMusic	4/5 stars

Super Highways is the second album by New Order members Gillian Gilbert and Stephen Morris under the name the Other Two. It was released in 1999 six years after their début, and a year after New Order reformed. Four tracks were co-written by Melanie Williams, who also sang lead on two of them ("You Can Fly" and "One Last Kiss") and backing vocals on the title track. The album was re-released in January 2010 by LTM Recordings, and in 2020 by Factory Benelux.

== Track listing ==
- All songs written and composed by The Other Two, except where noted.

No.	Title	Writer(s)	Length
1.	"You Can Fly"	The Other Two, Melanie Williams	4:55
2.	"Super Highways"	The Other Two, Melanie Williams	5:06
3.	"The River"		4:18
4.	"One Last Kiss"	The Other Two, Melanie Williams	5:06
5.	"Voytek"		4:57
6.	"Unwanted"		4:27
7.	"New Horizons"	The Other Two, Melanie Williams	4:08
8.	"Cold Feet"		4:35
9.	"The Grave"		6:50
10.	"Hello"		3:50
11.	"Ripple"	The Other Two, Tim Oliver	3:51
12.	"Weird Woman"		4:25

Japanese and 2010 bonus tracks^{1}
No.	Title	Writer(s)	Length
13.	"Super Highways" (Andy Votel Mix)	The Other Two, Melanie Williams	5:39
14.	"You Can Fly" (Cevin Fisher Mix)	The Other Two, Melanie Williams	8:54
15.	"Tasty Fish" (K-Klass Mix)	The Other Two, Jeremy Kerr	6:47

^{1} "Tasty Fish" (K-Klass Mix) was not featured on the Japanese edition of the album.

== Personnel ==
- The Other Two (Gillian Gilbert, Stephen Morris) – production
- Tim Oliver – production (all tracks), bass, additional keyboards, additional programming (tracks 3, 12)
- Paddy Steer – bass (tracks 2, 5, 6, 10, 12)
- Mike Mooney – guitar (tracks 2, 3, 4, 8, 10)
- Melanie Williams – vocals (tracks 1, 2, 4)
- Lynton Naiff – strings (tracks 3, 12)
- Ash Howes – mixing (all tracks except 2)
- Hugo Nicolson – mixing (track 2)
- Peter Saville – art direction
- Howard Wakefield and Paul Hetherington – design

== Release history ==
Region	Date	Label	Format	Catalog
United Kingdom	14 June 1999	London Records	Compact Disc	556 081-2
Europe	June, 1999	London	Compact Disc	3984 27817 2
Japan	28 July 1999	London/East West Japan	Compact Disc	AMCE-7063
United Kingdom	25 January 2010	LTM Recordings	Compact Disc	LTMCD 2551
