= Wind Takes Flight =

Studio album by Julia Sinclair and Marijn Cinjee
- Released: 4 July 2025
- Recorded: 2023–2024; Utrecht, Netherlands; Monom Studios, Berlin, Germany; Stone Nest, London, UK
- Genre: vocal music; experimental music; ambient
- Length: 73:55
- Label: Nimbus Records
- Producer: Richard Thomas

Wind Takes Flight: Hildegard x Electronics is a 2025 album by English soprano soloist Julia Sinclair and Dutch electronic musician and composer Marijn Cinjee, released on Nimbus Records. It features the 12th century chants of composer Hildegard of Bingen backed by ambient electronica. The album's title comes from "O ignis spiritus Paracliti", a sequence or liturgical poem by Hildegard. It was commissioned by the Richard Thomas Foundation, with its music first premiering live at the Royal Concertgebouw in December 2024 as part of the Aural Spaces festival. The album was first released in July 2025.

== Background ==
Soprano soloist Julia Sinclair studied engineering at Jesus College, Cambridge, and sang in their choir under music director Mark Williams. Sinclair appears on several popular recordings released by Signum Records during her time at Cambridge including My Beloved's Voice (2014), Out of Darkness (2015), The Evening Hour (2016), and Byrd / Britten (2017).

Dutch electronic musician and composer Marijn Cinjee met Sinclair in 2023 and began collaborating with her in London. They improvised together around Hildegard's "O Ignis Spiritus Paracliti" for the first time in April of that year at Stone Nest. Positive feedback from the audience led to a commission by the Richard Thomas Foundation. Their experiment at Stone Nest would also become solidified as the title track of their album, "Wind takes flight".

From 2023 to 2024, they recorded tracks for an album in Utrecht, Berlin, and London. In Utrecht, the song "Spring" was recorded in a tunnel (an underground bunker) to take advantage of its unique acoustical properties. In Berlin, tracks were recorded at the Monom spatial sound recording studios at Funkhaus Berlin. "Wind takes flight", was recorded live on a 4DSOUND spatial audio system at Stone Nest. The album was produced by Richard Thomas and mastered by Raphaël Mouterde.

Cinjee and Sinclair gave their first live performance of the album in immersive 40.4 spatial audio surround sound, at the Royal Concertgebouw in December 2024 as part of 4DSOUND's Aural Spaces festival. The piece "Ekstasis", which draws from Hildegard's "O virtus Sapientie", was created for the Royal Concertgebouw appearance. Concurrently, they released their EP Constellation, which contained four tracks from Wind Takes Flight. An album release concert was held on 5 July 2025 at the Grand Junction at St Mary Magdalene church, as part of the Eternal July series.

== Description ==
The title of the album, Wind Takes Flight, comes from "O ignis spiritus Paracliti", a sequence or liturgical poem by Hildegard. In the modern era, the hym is known under a larger collected work titled Symphonia Armonie Celestium Revelationum, or the "Symphony of the Harmony of Celestial Revelations". Wind Takes Flight is derived from the line "O iter fortissimum, quod penetravit omnia...De te nubes fluunt, ether volat", which is translated as "O mighty course that runs within and through all...From you the clouds flow forth, the wind takes flight." The title also touches upon Hildegard's interest in birds and nature, which is explored in several tracks.

The music features just the voice of Sinclair and only electronic music based on archaic instruments created by Cinjee. The original LP release contains eight tracks, five of which are based on Hildegard's liturgical and monophonic songs in the plainsong tradition, with three additional songs inspired by her melodies and themes, most of which contain original work. The CD release contains 13 tracks, including previously released, original material. The digital release contains 14 tracks with "Scarpinx" as bonus material. Cinjee and Sinclair describe the album as a "love letter" to the music of Hildegard.

The cover artwork and design of both the LP and CD was created by graphic design duo Brett Wickens and Peter Saville.

== Reception ==
Professional ratings
Review scores
Source	Rating
AllMusic	3.5/5 stars

Tracks from the album were played on BBC Radio 3 on their Breakfast Show in May and on their Saturday Morning programme in July 2025. Music journalist Thomas H. Green of The Arts Desk described the album as a contemplative work, with an "ethereal cosmic-classical ambience". James Manheim of AllMusic described the album as innovative and "state-of-the-art modern Hildegard", and called the original compositions "distinctive".

== Track listing ==
1. "O viridissima virga" (4:55)
2. "O rubor sanguinis" (3:47)
3. "Ave generosa" (7:48)
4. "Ave Maria" (3:58)
5. "First Voice" (3:11)
6. "Spring" (5:50)
7. "Eleison" (3:10)
8. "Ekstasis" (5:22)
9. "Wind takes flight" (9:34)
10. "Nolsca (bird song)" (3:07)
11. "Constellation" (6:14)
12. "XILIX" (4:10)
13. "Era" (6:30)
14. "Scarpinx" (6:19)
