= Ana Matronic =

American singer (born 1974)

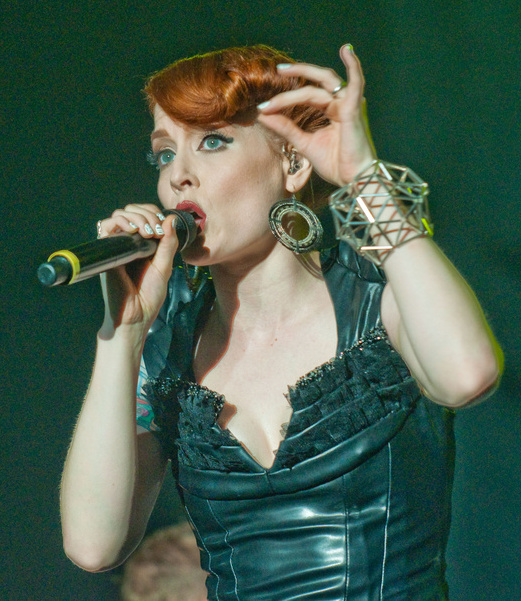
- Matronic performing with Scissor Sisters in 2010

Background information
- Born: Ana Lynch; August 14, 1974 (age 52); Portland, Oregon, U.S.
- Genres: Glam rock, alternative, pop
- Occupation: Singer
- Years active: 2000–present
- Spouse: Seth Kirby (m. 2010)

Ana Kirby (née Lynch; born August 14, 1974), known by her stage name Ana Matronic, is an American singer, best known as the co-lead singer for the pop rock band Scissor Sisters.

== Career ==
Matronic joined Scissor Sisters, founded by Jake Shears and Babydaddy, after they played their first live gig at club Knockoff on the Lower East Side of Manhattan.

She has stated that, in her eyes, the band is "about people displaying their fantasies on the outside, trying to break out of the everyday, and look like their dreams." In The Scissorhood, the fan community for Scissor Sisters, those fans who hold a special affinity for Ana are known as "nuns". Fans who are attracted to Ana, even if they might not usually be attracted to women, term themselves "Anasexual".

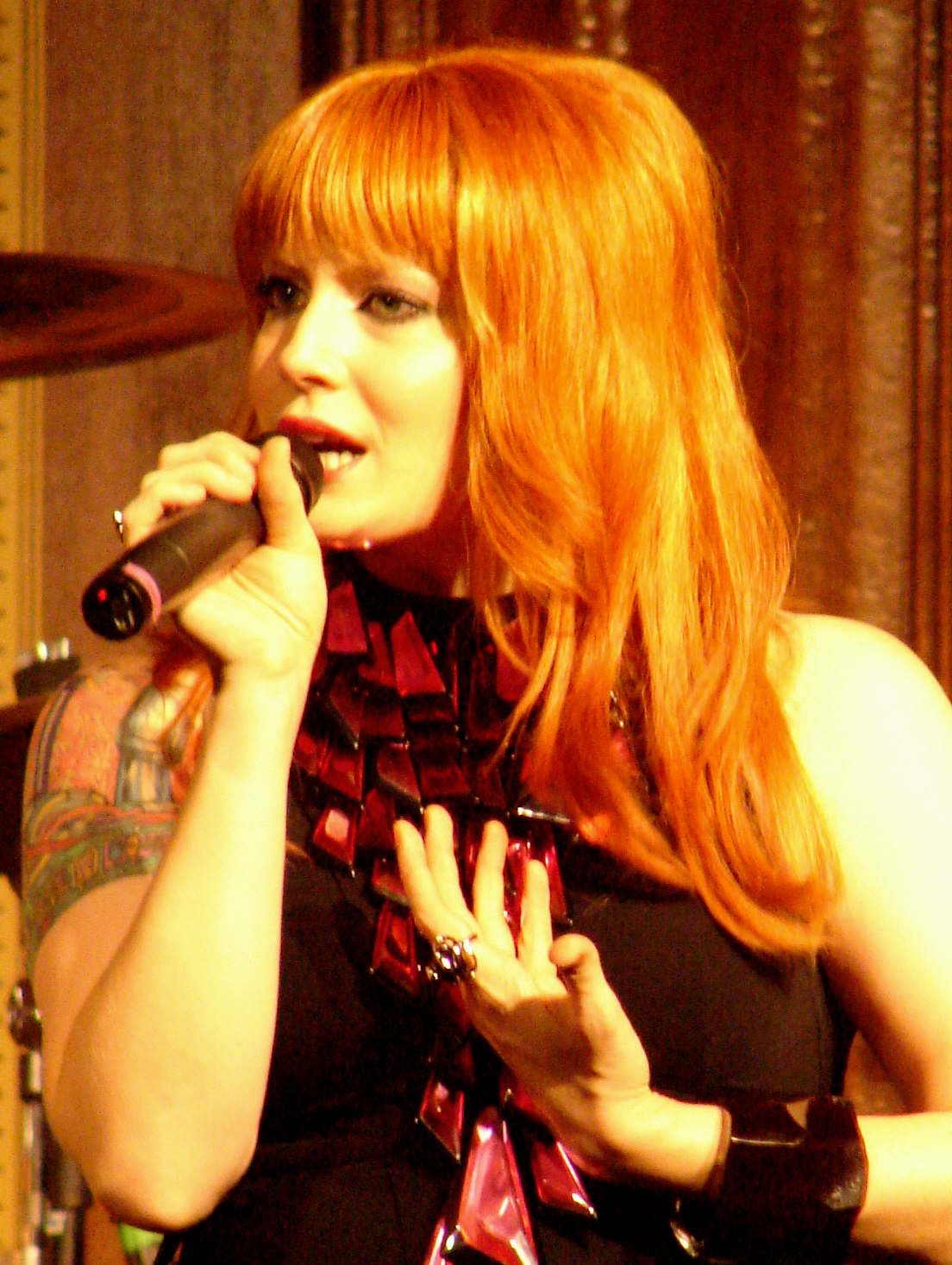
Matronic in 2005

In 2005, she was featured on the New Order single "Jetstream", taken from the band's album Waiting for the Sirens' Call. In 2009, Matronic performed on the glass harmonica at the New Museum in NYC in Auroville, a multimedia ritual tribute to an experimental community dedicated to the guru Sri Aurobindo. Ana appears as a guest vocalist on the Mark Ronson-produced track "Safe (In the Heat of the Moment)" from the December 21, 2010, release All You Need Is Now from the band Duran Duran.

In 2012, Matronic appeared as an advisor on The Voice UK, pairing up to assist Jessie J. The following year, she served as commentator of the BBC Three broadcast of the Eurovision Song Contest 2013 semi-finals in Malmö, Sweden, for the United Kingdom, replacing Sara Cox. Matronic returned in 2014 as radio commentator on Radio 2 Eurovision, a pop-up DAB station, for the second semi-final of the Eurovision Song Contest 2014 in Copenhagen, Denmark.

Matronic appeared on Strictly Come Dancing: It Takes Two on November 15, 2013, alongside Jason Donovan and Jodie Prenger.

She presented a weekly show on BBC Radio 2 from 00:00 to 02:00 on Sunday overnights. The show was titled Disco Devotion from April 2017, before changing its name to Dance Devotion. In 2022, she announced she would be leaving the station due to changes of the weekend schedule; the final edition of Dance Devotion aired on June 19. The final show contained 'anything with a repetitive beat', songs of which include Deep Inside by Hardrive, You Got The Love by Candi Staton, and Professional Widow by Tori Amos and Armand van Helden. From July 24–27, 2017, she covered for Jo Whiley and presented a special programme alongside Scott Mills on July 29 celebrating the 50th anniversary of the decriminalisation of male homosexual activity in England and Wales. She performed a live DJ set at Radio 2 Live in Hyde Park on September 10, 2018, and has hosted a New Year's Eve 2018 show for the channel. Matronic covers when BBC Radio 2 regular presenters are on holiday.

Her punning stage name is said to be due to "a deep and abiding love of robots".

In January 2019, she appeared on the BBC TV show Mastermind with The Bionic Woman as her specialist subject and Beyond Reflections (then known as Chrysalis) as her chosen charity.

The Scissor Sisters announced a reunion in October 2024, but Matronic chose not to take part. Shears told The Independent: "I think it just didn't line up. It's not something that she wanted to do at this moment in time. And I didn't want that to keep us from coming out and playing these songs."

Addressing her absence from the reunion tour, Matronic wrote on Instagram:

People familiar with my story and career arc will know that in the heart of this Showgirl lies a giant Nerd. In the past decade my Nerd self has taken the wheel and is now driving my career. I am currently finishing production on the first season of my history podcast Good Time Sallies, which has grown into several long-term research and writing projects. With contracts signed and schedules agreed on these commitments, the timing of a Scissor reunion does not allow me to join my former bandmates for this tour. I wish the band and our fans all the best… I will be there in spirit to kiki with you!

Matronic was featured in Disco: Soundtrack of a Revolution, a 2024 BBC and PBS co-production and three-part documentary about the rise of disco music in the 1970s.

== Book ==
In 2015, she penned a book titled Robot Universe: Legendary Automatons and Androids from the Ancient World to the Distant Future; published by Sterling New York.

== Personal life ==
Matronic described herself as having a "Cornish, Welsh, and Irish heritage". During a performance in Cardiff, Wales, Matronic "came out" as Welsh stating that "some people in England have told me I don't want to be telling people about it", adding "it's true. Generations back the Matronics originally came from Wales. There were just a few more 'w's and 'g's and 'l's in the name in the past." Matronic has a tattoo on her ankle of a Celtic knot to signify her roots, as well as a large tattoo on her right shoulder of bionic circuitry.

Matronic married her long-time boyfriend and fiancé Seth Kirby in April 2010 at New York City Hall after they had been together for seven years. She has had relationships with women, but stated in a 2013 interview with Diva she "[doesn't] like identifying as gay or straight or even bisexual."
