= Jetstream (song) =

2005 single by New Order

Single by New Order

from the album Waiting for the Sirens' Call
- Released: 16 May 2005
- Length: 5:23 (album version); 3:47 (radio edit)
- Label: London, Warner Bros.
- Songwriters: Bernard Sumner, Stephen Morris, Phil Cunningham, Peter Hook, S. Price, A. Lynch
- Producers: New Order, Stuart Price

New Order singles chronology
"Krafty" (2005)	"Jetstream" (2005)	"Waiting for the Sirens' Call" (2005)

Music video
- "Jetstream" on YouTube

"Jetstream" is a song by English band New Order. Released through Warner Bros. Records on 16 May 2005, it is the second single to be taken from their eighth studio album, Waiting for the Sirens' Call (2005). The song features Scissor Sisters member Ana Matronic on additional vocals. "Jetstream" charted at number 20 in the United Kingdom and number 30 in Ireland. The music video for the song is the first to feature the band since 1993's "World (The Price of Love)".

== Track listings ==
All tracks are written by New Order, S. Price and A. Lynch.

CD1: NUOCD14 (UK and Europe)
No.	Title	Length
1.	"Jetstream" (radio edit)	3:46
2.	"Jetstream" (Richard X remix edit)	3:36

CD2 (Enhanced): NUCDP14 (UK and Europe)
No.	Title	Length
1.	"Jetstream" (Jacques Lu Cont remix)	8:21
2.	"Jetstream" (Richard X remix)	7:39
3.	"Jetstream" (Tom Neville remix)	7:33
4.	"Jetstream" (Arthur Baker remix)	7:02
5.	"Jetstream" (original)	5:22
6.	"Jetstream" (video and U-MYX software)

12-inch single: NUOX14 (UK)
No.	Title	Length
1.	"Jetstream" (Jacques Lu Cont remix)	8:19
2.	"Jetstream" (radio edit)	3:42
3.	"Jetstream" (Richard X remix)	7:36
4.	"Jetstream" (Tom Neville remix)	7:30

CD: 5046787462 (Australia)
No.	Title	Length
1.	"Jetstream" (radio edit)
2.	"Jetstream" (Jacques Lu Cont remix)
3.	"Jetstream" (Richard X remix)
4.	"Jetstream" (Tom Neville remix)
5.	"Jetstream" (Arthur Baker remix)
6.	"Jetstream" (original)

== Charts ==
=== Weekly charts ===
Chart (2005)	Peak position
Australia (ARIA)	79
Germany (GfK)	86
Ireland (IRMA)	30
Scottish Singles Sales (Official Charts)	20
UK Singles (Official Charts)	20
UK Dance (Official Charts)	4
US Dance Club Songs (Billboard)	3
US Dance Singles Sales (Billboard)	7

=== Year-end charts ===
Chart (2005)	Position
US Dance Club Play (Billboard)	19
