= The Peter Saville Show Soundtrack =

Album by New Order

EP by New Order
- Released: 2003
- Genre: Ambient
- Length: 30:15
- Label: London
- Producer: New Order

New Order chronology
1981-1982 New Order (1982)	The Peter Saville Show Soundtrack (2003)

The Peter Saville Show Soundtrack is an EP released by British band New Order in 2003. It was produced to accompany a Peter Saville exhibition, The Peter Saville Show, which appeared at London's Design Museum in 2003, and from 23 January to 18 April 2004 at Urbis in Manchester.

Peter Saville was a partner in Factory Records and a graphic designer who designed many record sleeves for Joy Division and New Order throughout their careers at Factory Records. The exhibition included this artwork and other graphic design from Saville's ongoing career.

Although The Peter Saville Show Soundtrack is credited to New Order, only New Order members Stephen Morris, Peter Hook and Phil Cunningham were involved in producing the music - Bernard Sumner was not present for the recording. This was a CD-only release, limited to 3,000 copies. It was released by London Records with the catalogue number "SAVILLE1".

As is typical of many New Order releases, the sleeve of the CD has no printed information of its contents. The front cover shows Saville at his drawing board, whereas the back shows a screen print frame for the Peter Saville Show exhibition poster. The inner sleeve (made of a slightly lighter weight card) shows two photographs (one on front and one on back) of the exhibition artwork in preparation. The disc itself states that The Peter Saville Show Soundtrack was written and produced by New Order and mixed by Merv De Peyer. It also states that the design and photography was by the Graphic Thought Facility. The only indication of a catalogue number is shown on the reverse (shiny) side of the disc. Around the centre hole clearly reads 'DISCTRONICS' and 'SAVILLE 1 01'.

== Track listing ==
1. "The Peter Saville Show Soundtrack" - 30:13
