= Procession (New Order song) =

Single by New Order
- B-side: "Everything's Gone Green"
- Released: September 1981
- Recorded: 10–13 March 1981
- Studio: Strawberry Studios; Yellow Two Studios
- Genre: Post-punk
- Length: 4:27
- Label: Factory; FAC 53
- Songwriters: Gillian Gilbert, Peter Hook, Stephen Morris, Bernard Sumner
- Producer: Martin Hannett

New Order singles chronology
"Ceremony" (1981)	"Procession" (1981)	"Everything's Gone Green" (1981)

Music video
- "Procession" on YouTube

"Procession" is the second single by the British group New Order, released in September 1981 on 7" vinyl record. It is a double A side with "Everything's Gone Green". The single's Factory Records catalogue number is FAC 53. (Labelled as B Music)

== Background and recording ==
Along with "Everything's Gone Green", "Procession" was recorded during a three day studio session with Martin Hannett in Strawberry Studios and Yellow Two Studios. Bernard Sumner, at the request of Hannett, re-recorded his vocals at least forty-three times. In retrospect for his book Substance: Inside New Order, Peter Hook wrote: "'Procession' was a good song and Barney was doing a good vocal. The only problem in the studio that night was Martin." Hannett additionally requested the backing vocals from Gillian Gilbert; Hook was against it, but was outvoted by the rest of the band.

== Composition ==
Though all of New Order's songs are credited as group compositions, Hook has stated that the lyricist of "Procession" is Stephen Morris:

"Procession" was a complete contrast to "Ceremony": Steve had written the lyrics and the vocal hook, and it sounded very poppy and immediate. It also helped us find a great use for that Yamaha amp we'd bought in America that cost us a fortune in import duty. It had a reverb spring in it, and when you shook it, it made a great noise. So we shook it like hell, recorded it and featured it in the song.

== Availability ==
The song does not appear on any of New Order's studio albums; it does, however, appear on the EP 1981–1982, the CD, cassette, and Digital Audio Tape releases of the 1987 singles compilation Substance (where it is erroneously listed as a B-side), the 2005 compilation Singles, and the 2008 Collector's Edition of the band's debut album Movement.

== Artwork ==
Similar to the album cover for Movement, the artwork is taken from a "Dinamo Futurista" magazine cover done by Italian futurist designer Fortunato Depero. Notably, the UK release's sleeve came in nine versions, all with different colours: black, blue, aqua, yellow, red, brown, orange, green and purple. The second side of the single contains a shortened version of "Everything's Gone Green", the full-length version of which was later released as a 12" single on its own.

Although the original UK single does not indicate which is side A or B (the runoff matrix simply lists "SOFT" and "HARD" for each side), the French edition of the single actually has "Everything's Gone Green" labeled as the A-side track, and some Spanish and Portuguese pressings have reversed labels.

== Track listing ==
All tracks are written by Gillian Gilbert, Peter Hook, Stephen Morris and Bernard Sumner.

7": FAC 53 (UK)
No.	Title	Length
1.	"Procession"	4:25
2.	"Everything's Gone Green"	4:11
Total length:		8:36

== Chart positions ==
Chart (1981)	Peak position
UK Singles Chart	38
UK Independent Singles Chart	1
