= Fine Time =

1988 single by New Order

Single by New Order

from the album Technique
- B-side: "Don't Do It"
- Released: 28 November 1988
- Studio: Mediterranean (Ibiza, Spain); Real World (Box, Wiltshire, England)
- Genre: Acid house; dance-pop
- Length: 4:42 (album version); 3:10 (7-inch edit)
- Label: Factory
- Songwriters: Gillian Gilbert; Peter Hook; Stephen Morris; Bernard Sumner
- Producer: New Order

New Order singles chronology
"Blue Monday 1988" (1988)	"Fine Time" (1988)	"Round & Round" (1989)

Music video
- "Fine Time" on YouTube

"Fine Time" is a song by English rock band New Order, released as the first single from their fifth studio album, Technique (1989). The song was written and partially recorded in Ibiza; its title was inspired by an incident in which band member Stephen Morris's car was towed, and he had to remember to pay the fine. The single, released on 28 November 1988, received widespread praise during its release and retrospectively. It was also a commercial success, reaching No. 11 on the UK Singles Chart and peaking inside the top 10 in Finland, Ireland, and New Zealand, as well as on three US Billboard genre charts.

== Background ==
According to lead vocalist Bernard Sumner, the band first wrote "Fine Time" after a night at the Amnesia nightclub in Ibiza. Originally, Sumner wanted to record the vocals with an erotic inflection comparable to that of Donna Summer's, but after recording the first take, he realised that the results were far from expectations and sounded as if he were "stuck on the toilet with constipation". On the naming of the track, Stephen Morris said, "my car had been towed away and I had to remind myself to go and pay the fine. I just wrote 'Fine Time' on this piece of paper to remind myself to go get it and thought, that's a good title." The end of the track features a sheep bleating, which New Order claimed was a joke about fans of acid music "following the flock".

== Critical reception ==
Adam D of Fourculture magazine praised the song, calling its bassline "irresistible" and referring to it as a "monster" of a song, going on to say that none of New Order's following singles were as upbeat or cheeky as "Fine Time". Niner Times writer Aaron Febre said that the song, especially its low-pitched voice sample and the synthesiser, refurbished the band and gave them a fresh start. Reviewing Technique on AllMusic, John Bush called the track one of New Order's most outgoing songs. On the same site, speaking of the song, Ned Raggett said that the band "not only had paid attention to the acid-house/Ibiza explosion but used it for its own ends, capturing the frenetic energy that the musical eruption on British shores had unleashed with strength and style". He also noted Stephen Morris's "hyperactive" rhythms and Gillian Gilbert's "squirrelly" keyboard playing.

== Commercial performance ==
New Order's press team wanted to release "Vanishing Point" as the first single from Technique, but the band instead chose "Fine Time", and it was released on 28 November 1988. It debuted at No. 23 on the UK Singles Chart on 4 December 1988, climbing to its peak position of No. 11 two weeks afterwards and logging a total of eight weeks in the UK top 100. In Ireland, the single first appeared on the Irish Singles Chart on 8 December and peaked at No. 9. On the American Billboard charts, the record reached the top ten on three listings, rising to No. 3 on the Modern Rock Tracks chart in January, No. 2 on the Dance Club Play chart in February, and No. 3 on the 12-inch Singles Sales chart in March.

"Fine Time" also proved to be successful elsewhere during early 1989. In January, the song reached No. 20 in Spain while making its No. 8 debut in Finland. The following month, it topped off at No. 3 on the Finnish Singles Chart. It was a moderate hit on the Eurochart Hot 100, stalling at No. 52. On 5 February, the single debuted at No. 46 in Australia, taking four weeks to peak at No. 20 and spending nine issue in the Australian top 50. In neighbouring New Zealand, it debuted at its highest position on the New Zealand Singles Chart—No. 3—in March and remained on the chart for 11 more weeks before dropping off.

== Track listings ==
All tracks are written by Gillian Gilbert, Peter Hook, Stephen Morris and Bernard Sumner.

7-inch: Fac223-7 (UK)
No.	Title	Length
1.	"Fine Time"	3:08
2.	"Don't Do It"	4:30

12-inch 1: Fac223 (UK)
No.	Title	Length
1.	"Fine Time"	4:42
2.	"Don't Do It"	4:30
3.	"Fine Line"	4:43

12-inch 2: Fac223R (UK) – Fine Time (Remix)
No.	Title	Length
1.	"Fine Time" (Silk Mix) (Remixed by Steve "Silk" Hurley)	6:15
2.	"Fine Time" (Messed Around Mix) (Remixed by Steve "Silk" Hurley)	4:35

CD: Facd223 (UK)
No.	Title	Length
1.	"Fine Time" (7-inch edit)	3:08
2.	"Fine Time" (Silk Mix) (remixed by Steve "Silk" Hurley)	6:15
3.	"Fine Time" (Messed Around Mix) (remixed by Steve "Silk" Hurley))	4:35
4.	"Don't Do It"	4:30

== Charts ==
=== Weekly charts ===
Chart (1988–1989)	Peak position
Australia (ARIA)	20
Europe (Eurochart Hot 100)	52
Finland (Suomen virallinen lista)	3
Ireland (IRMA)	9
New Zealand (Recorded Music NZ)	3
Spain (AFYVE)	20
UK Singles (Official Charts)	11
UK Indie (OCC)	1
US Alternative Airplay (Billboard)	3
US Dance Club Songs (Billboard)	2
US Dance Singles Sales (Billboard)	3

=== Year-end charts ===
Chart (1989)	Position
US 12-inch Singles Sales (Billboard)	27
US Dance Club Play (Billboard)	4
US Modern Rock Tracks (Billboard)	26
