= Temptation (New Order song) =

- 12" cover sleeve

Single by New Order
- B-side: "Hurt"
- Released: 10 May 1982
- Recorded: 1981–1982
- Studio: Advision Studios, London
- Genre: New wave; post-punk
- Length: 5:21 (7"); 8:47 (12"); 7:00 (1987 version); 4:08 (1998 version)
- Label: Factory – FAC 63
- Songwriters: Gillian Gilbert; Peter Hook; Stephen Morris; Bernard Sumner
- Producer: New Order

New Order singles chronology
"Everything's Gone Green" (1981)	"Temptation" (1982)	"Blue Monday" (1983)

Music Video
- "Temptation" on YouTube

"Temptation" is a song by the English band New Order. It was released as their fourth overall single on 10 May 1982 through Factory Records, backed by the B-side "Hurt". The band began recording the song as an instrumental in 1981, with frontman Bernard Sumner developing its lyrics as improvisations during live shows. He and bassist Peter Hook later finished it during a 1982 studio session, handling the song's recording and refining parts originally conceived live. Marking a departure from the band's sound as part of Joy Division, "Temptation" features heavy influence from dance music and uplifting lyrics about the aftermath of a breakup.

Released as a stand-alone single, "Temptation" reached number 29 on the UK Singles Chart and topped the UK Independent Singles Chart. It received positive reviews from music critics upon release, and has since become acclaimed through retrospective reviews.

== Background and recording ==
New Order was formed in 1980 by the three remaining members of English band Joy Division after frontman Ian Curtis committed suicide, as they had agreed to stop using the name if any member left or died. They began recording demos during the summer of 1980, and made their debut as a live act in July. According to bassist Peter Hook, "Temptation" was originally recorded as an instrumental in 1981 due to there being no pre-written lyrics for it. The band began playing early versions with improvised lyrics at their live shows during September 1981, notably performing a 10-minute long rendition during a concert on 19 November 1981. When they first started playing the song, vocalist Bernard Sumner would come up with lyrics while drunk, with Hook noting that he originally sang "I've got a cock like the M[1]." New Order performed as a trio during this period, having yet to recruit keyboardist Gillian Gilbert, and there was uncertainty regarding if Sumner would be the band's permanent vocalist.

New Order went to Admission Studios in London in 1982 to finish "Temptation", where Sumner and Hook handled the recording and overdubbing. The keyboards and drum machines were recorded first, with acoustic instruments being layered over until the two were satisfied with the song structure and amount of melodies. Sumner recorded his final vocals while under the effects of "a mild dose of LSD", reusing the best lyrics from his improvised performances and further refining them. The song's "Ooh" vocals originated from a technique Sumner developed that he called "dah dee deeing", where he would "hum, whistle, and scat-sing" over the backing track to come up with melodies for vocal lines. While Sumner was recording, Hook and manager Rob Gretton shoved a snowball down his shirt, resulting in the "startled yelp" audible on the 12" version's intro. The B-side to the "Temptation" single, "Hurt" (originally titled "Cramp"), was finished in the same session and was the band's first song to be fully programmed with sequencers.

Unlike New Order's previous output, "Temptation" was self-produced by them, as their previous producer, Martin Hannett, stormed off while mixing the single "Everything's Gone Green" after being asked to make the drums louder. While producing it, the band used their previous experience working on "Everything's Gone Green" and the track "Truth" as a base to move forward; Hook later wrote in a note to engineer Peter Woolliscroft that the song was "our first attempt at producing all show & no go." Its production incorporated dance elements that later became prevalent in their sound, originally inspired by a trip they took New York City in 1981 that encouraged drummer Stephen Morris to teach himself drum programming.

== Composition ==
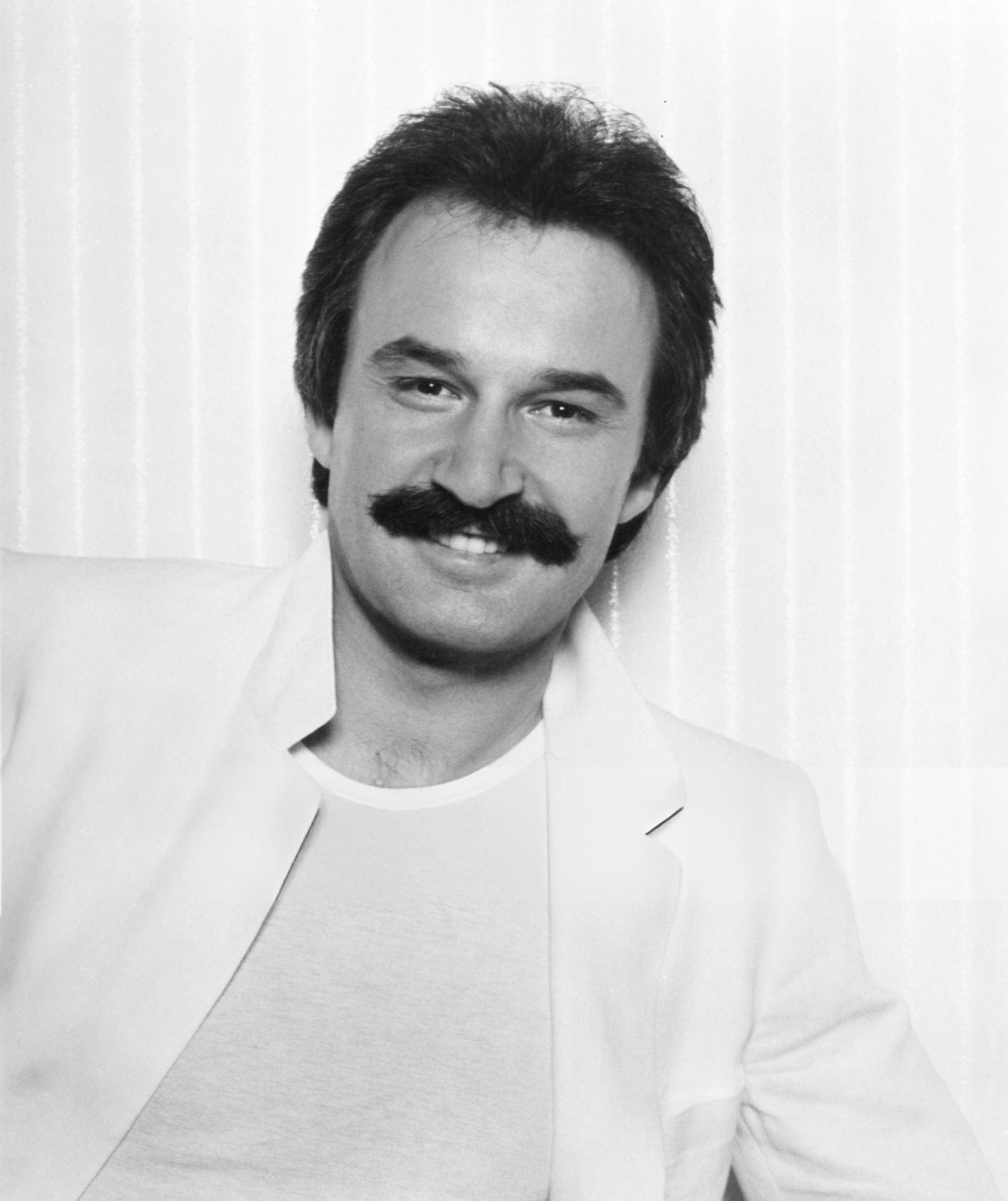
Giorgio Moroder (pictured in 1979) was an influence on New Order when creating "Temptation".

"Temptation" is noted for moving away from the sound of Joy Division, being comparatively more upbeat and optimistic to their previously bleak output. Hook later stated in his memoir Substance: Inside New Order that the band's love of Italian music producer Giorgio Moroder heavily influenced the song, particularly his solo album E=MC² (1979). AllMusic's Bill Janovitz noted Moroder's influence in Gilbert's keyboards, which he believes influenced Morris' drum rhythms to resemble those from "mid- to late-'70s disco and underground New York dance music."

"Temptation" opens with a fade-in where Sumner can be heard singing the song's phonetic hook. Hook plays a bassline throughout that emphasises being melodic rather than providing a bottom register, with synthesiser textures and varied drumming being provided by Gilbert and Morris, respectively. The lyrics, co-written by all members of New Order, detail an uplifting and triumphant feeling following a romantic breakup. Sumner sings the chant of "Up, down, turn around, please don’t let me hit the ground" with a fun delivery, while the song's coda (referred to by the band as the "eyes drop") is a singalong chorus about a lover's eye color, who Sumner finds distinct from anyone he has previously met.

== Release ==
"Temptation" was released as a single on 10 May 1982 through Factory Records, with "Hurt" being its B-side. The 7" version plays at 33⅓ rpm to accommodate its length of around five and a half minutes. Both versions bear the same catalogue number "FAC 63" despite these differences. The 12" versions of both "Temptation" and "Hurt" appear on New Order's compilation EP 1981–1982, released a few months after the single itself. Neither version mentioned the band's name on the sleeve; instead, the song title and catalogue number FAC 63 were embossed into the cover. Nearly twenty years after the single's release, Morris admitted to the band that he was unhappy with "Temptation" due to how the snare drum was panned to one side, which he previously kept a secret despite hating it.

== Critical reception ==
The Village Voice critic Robert Christgau described the original version of "Temptation" as being "where Manchester's finest stop hearing ghosts and stake their claim to a danceable pop of unprecedented grimness and power," noting it as "the first real song this sharp-cornered sound-and-groove band has ever come up with."

=== Retrospective reviews ===
In a list for The Guardian, Alexis Petridis named "Temptation" as New Order's second best song, writing that "the song itself – ramshackle but danceable, gleefully poppy, falsetto vocals – [was] evidence that New Order had hit on a new, distinct identity. You can understand why the band chose to re-record it more slickly in 1987, but the original’s cack-handed exuberance is part of its charm." In a retrospective review of every single featured on the compilation album Substance 1987, Steve Speller of Dig! praised the re-recorded version of "Temptation" as the group's "first truly great pop song." Rolling Stone's Rob Shefffield placed it twentieth on a list of the 200 best songs of the 1980s, opining that the song "sent [New Order] on their way to defining 1980s club sounds," also preferring the original 1982 recording over the group's "tinker[ed]" with versions from later years.

== Temptation '87 ==
A re-recorded version of the song (titled "Temptation '87 on the 2023 reissue) was created for the compilation album Substance 1987. The original recording of the song is available on the third CD of the 2023 expanded reissue.

== Music video ==
In 2006, the song was interpreted in a video titled The Temptation of Victoria by filmmaker Michael Shamberg, who had previously directed a number of music videos for New Order. The video features Victoria Bergsman of Swedish band The Concretes, who portrays a young woman in Paris who steals a vinyl copy of the song's original 12-inch release from a vintage record shop (the now defunct Bimbo Tower), along with a bouquet from a flower shop. She returns to her apartment and begins dancing to the record, causing the video to switch from black and white into color.

== Track listing ==
All tracks are written by Gillian Gilbert, Peter Hook, Stephen Morris and Bernard Sumner.

7": FAC 63 (UK)
No.	Title	Length
1.	"Temptation"	5:21
2.	"Hurt"	4:47

12": FAC 63 (UK)
No.	Title	Length
1.	"Temptation"	8:47
2.	"Hurt"	8:13

== Charts ==
Chart (1982)	Peak position
UK Singles Chart	29
UK Independent Singles Chart	1
US Billboard Hot Dance Club Play	68

== Personnel ==
Credits adapted from Apple Music.

- Bernard Sumner – synthesiser, guitar, vocals, programming, keyboards
- Peter Hook – bass guitar, programming, synthesiser, keyboards, production
- Gillian Gilbert – synthesiser, programming, guitar, keyboards
- Stephen Morris – drums, programming, synthesiser, keyboards
- Peter Woolliscroft – engineer
- Michael Johnson – engineer ("Temptation '87")

== Sources ==
- Reynolds, Simon (2005). Rip It Up and Start Again: Postpunk 1978–1984. Penguin. ISBN 0-14-303672-6.
- Flowers, Claude (1995). New Order + Joy Division: Dreams Never End. London: Omnibus Press. ISBN 0-7119-4308-7.
