= Peter Saville (graphic designer) =

British graphic designer (born 1955)

Peter Saville CBE RDI
- Saville at "I realize 2009", Turin
- Born: 9 October 1955 (age 71); Manchester, Lancashire, England
- Occupations: Art director; graphic designer
- Known for: Design of record and CD covers

Peter Andrew Saville (born 9 October 1955) is an English art director and graphic designer. He designed many record sleeves for Factory Records, which he co-founded in 1978 alongside Tony Wilson and Alan Erasmus.

== Early life ==
Peter Saville was born in Manchester, Lancashire, and attended St Ambrose College. He studied graphic design at Manchester Polytechnic from 1975 to 1978.

Saville became involved in the music scene after meeting Tony Wilson, the journalist and broadcaster. The meeting resulted in Wilson commissioning the first Factory poster (FAC 1). Saville was a partner in Factory Records along with Wilson, Martin Hannett, Rob Gretton and Alan Erasmus.

== Factory Records ==
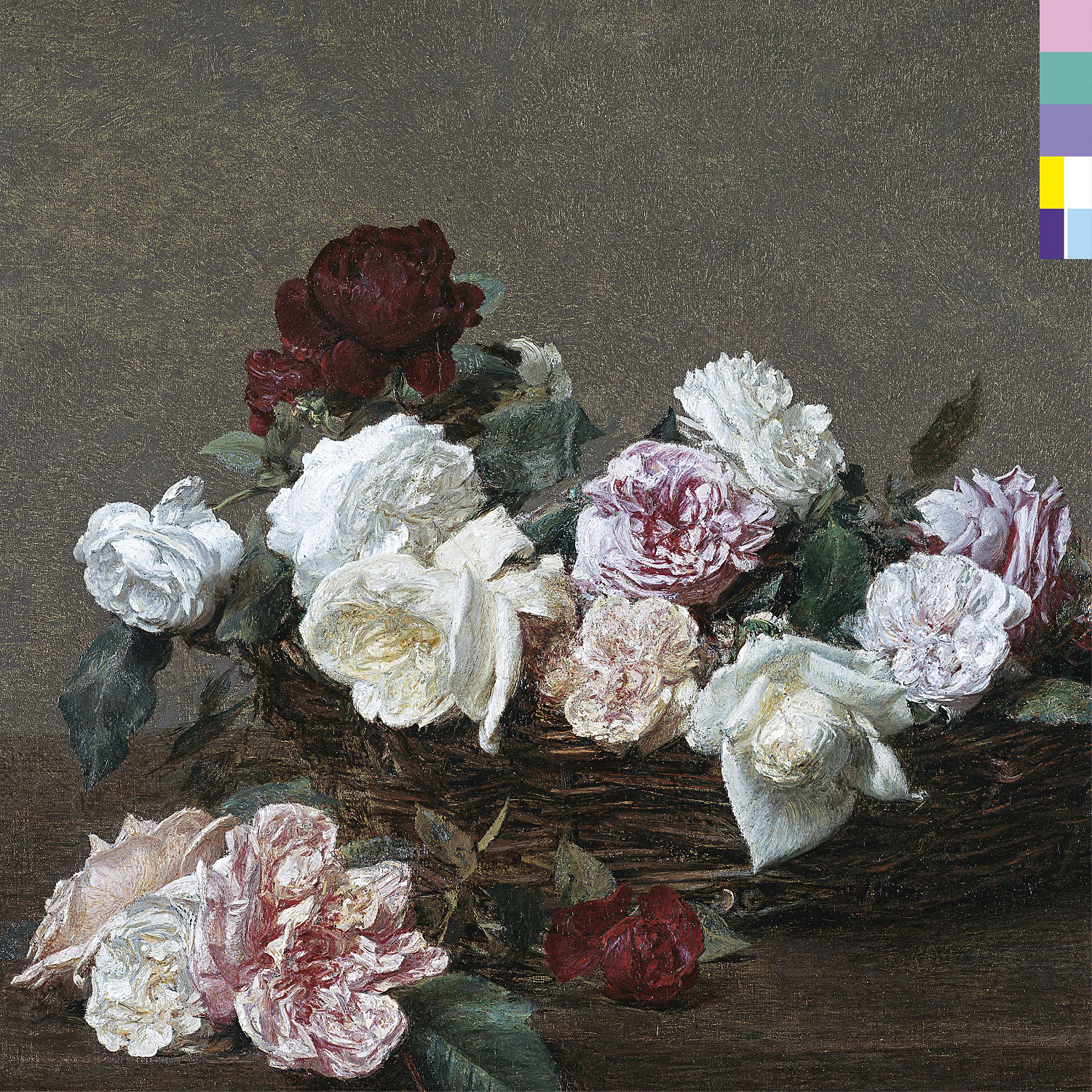
Saville's cover art for the 1983 New Order album Power, Corruption & Lies demonstrates his Factory-era affinity for re-appropriating and re-contextualizing preexisting artwork.

Peter Saville designed many record sleeves for Factory artists, most notably for Joy Division and New Order.

Influenced by fellow student Malcolm Garrett, who had begun designing for the Manchester punk group Buzzcocks, and by Herbert Spencer's Pioneers of Modern Typography, Saville was inspired by Jan Tschichold, chief propagandist for the New Typography. According to Saville: "Malcolm had a copy of Herbert Spencer's Pioneers of Modern Typography. The one chapter that he hadn't reinterpreted in his own work was the cool, disciplined 'New Typography' of Tschichold and its subtlety appealed to me. I found a parallel in it for the New Wave that was evolving out of Punk."

Saville collaborated with Ben Kelly on numerous projects during this period. Saville credited Kelly as a major influence on his work, saying "I thought I could just take things from Ben, like he was a reference book or something. He used to get really mad about it." Kelly and Saville won a Designers and Art Directors Award for the sleeve of Orchestral Manoeuvres in the Dark's 1980 self-titled first album.

Saville's album design for Joy Division's last album, Closer, released shortly after the suicide of Ian Curtis in May 1980, was controversial in its depiction of Christ's body entombed. However, the design pre-dated Curtis's death, which the magazine New Musical Express confirmed, since it had been displaying proofs of the artwork in its offices for several months.

Saville's output from this period included re-appropriation from the canon of art and design. Design critic Alice Twemlow wrote: "... in the 1980s ... he would directly and irreverently 'lift' an image from one genre—art history for example—and recontextualise it in another. A Fantin-Latour 'Roses' painting in combination with a colour-coded alphabet became the seminal album cover for New Order's Power, Corruption & Lies (1983), for example."

In the 2002 film 24 Hour Party People, which is based on Tony Wilson and the history of Factory Records, Saville is portrayed by actor Enzo Cilenti. His reputation for missing deadlines is comically highlighted in the film.

== Non-Factory work ==
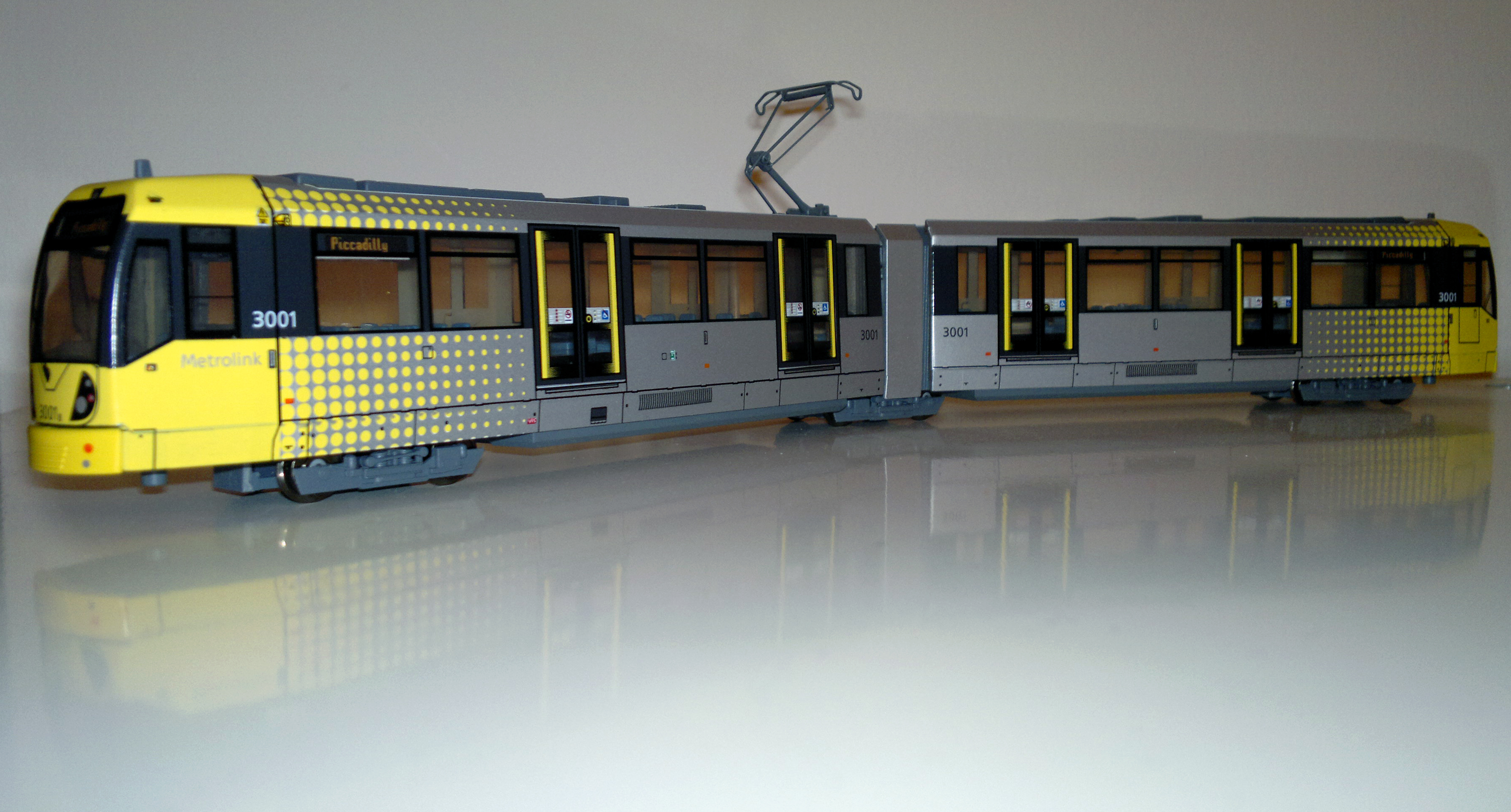
Model of Manchester Metrolink tram showing Saville's livery design (2008)

In 1979, Saville moved from Manchester to London and became art director of the Virgin offshoot Dindisc. He subsequently created a body of work that furthered his refined take on modernism, producing work for artists such as Roxy Music, Wham!, Orchestral Manoeuvres in the Dark, Ultravox and Peter Gabriel. During his time at Dindisc, he also designed the sleeve for Canadian band Martha and the Muffins’ album Metro Music. He was paid more to design Gabriel's 1986 album So than for any other record sleeve in his career; he received £20,000. Saville founded the design agency Peter Saville Associates (still designing primarily for musical artists and record labels), which included Brett Wickens, before he was invited to close his office in 1990 to join the partner-owned Pentagram. Saville collaborated with Transport for Greater Manchester in 2008 for the rebranding of the Metrolink tram system with a yellow and silver polka-dot scheme after a period of significant expansion had been undertaken on the network.

== Work after Factory Records ==
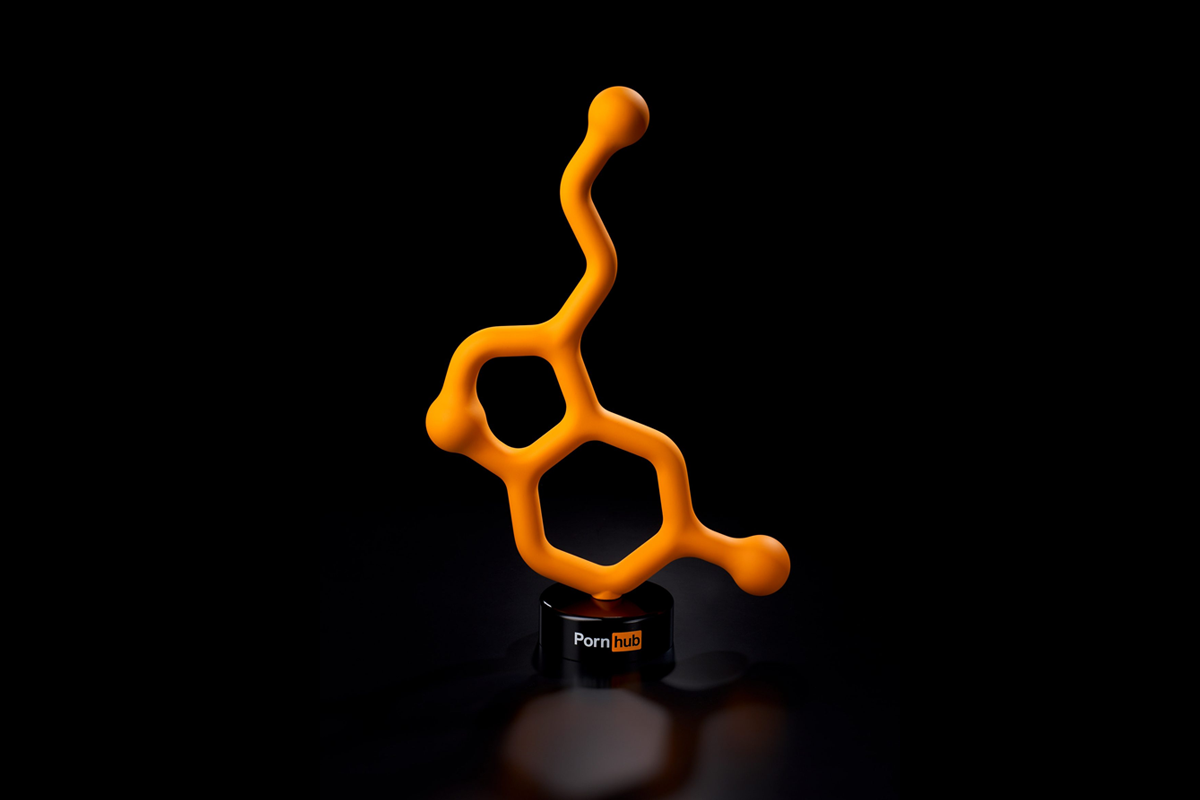
Pornhub Award trophy (2019)

In 1993 Saville left London and moved to Los Angeles, to join ad agency Frankfurt Balkind with Brett Wickens. Saville soon returned to London, however, where he asked designer Howard Wakefield to restart the design studio. For three years they worked from "The Apartment" in partnership with German advertising agency Meiré & Meiré. Saville's modernist apartment in Mayfair doubled as the London studio. (The same apartment is depicted in the record sleeve of Pulp's album This Is Hardcore.) The Apartment produced works for clients such as Mandarina Duck and Smart Car. In 1999 Saville moved to offices in Clerkenwell.

Saville grew in demand as a younger generation of people in advertising and fashion had grown up with his work for Factory Records. He reached a creative and a commercial peak with design consultancy clients such as Selfridges, EMI and Pringle. Other significant commissions came from the field of fashion. Saville's fashion clients have included Jil Sander, John Galliano, Yohji Yamamoto, Christian Dior, Stella McCartney and Calvin Klein Saville often worked in collaboration with longtime friend, fashion photographer Nick Knight. The two launched the art and fashion website SHOWstudio in November 2000. Belgian fashion designer Raf Simons was granted full access to the archives of Saville's vintage Factory projects and made a personal selection of Saville-designed works to integrate them into Raf Simons "Closer" Autumn/Winter 2003–2004 collection. Raf Simons Spring/Summer 2018 collection also features a selection of archival works by Saville.

In 2004 Saville became Creative Director of the City of Manchester, playing a strategic role in the regeneration and cultural renaissance of his home city, notably defining the ethos for the Manchester International Festival.

In 2010 Saville designed the England national football team home shirt.

Saville has three D&AD awards, is a Royal Designer for Industry and won the London Design Medal in 2013.

In 2012 Saville collaborated with Dovecot Studios, Edinburgh in celebration of their centenary to create a large scale tapestry of his work After, After Monarch of the Glen. This new tapestry commission is Dovecot Studios reappropriation of Peter Saville's appropriation of Sir Peter Blake's appropriation of Sir Edwin Landseer's 1851 painting Monarch of the Glen.

In 2018, Saville redesigned the logo for British luxury fashion house Burberry, as revealed by then creative director Riccardo Tisci.

In July 2019 Saville was featured in the BBC Radio 4 programme Only Artists in conversation with industrial designer Marek Reichman. Also in In 2019, he designed a trophy for the Pornhub Awards, which according to Dezeen is "based on the shape of sex hormones".

Saville was appointed Commander of the Order of the British Empire (CBE) in the 2020 New Year Honours for services to design.

Saville works with Jony Ive's studio LoveFrom.

== Exhibition, book and soundtrack ==
Saville's reclaimed status and contribution to graphic design were firmly established when London's Design Museum exhibited his body of work in 2003. The exhibition, The Peter Saville Show, was open from 23 May to 14 September 2003. A book published by Frieze, Designed by Peter Saville, accompanied the exhibition. The Peter Saville Show Soundtrack for the exhibition was performed and recorded by New Order, and was available to early visitors to the exhibition.

== Swing Project ==
Anna Blessmann and Peter Saville met in a gallery in Berlin in 2001 and soon began an artwork collaboration, works have been shown at Paul Stolper Gallery London, CRAC Alsace, Migros Museum Zurich, Whitechapel London and in various publications.

In 2010 they presented 'Swing Project 1' in the FRAC Champagne-Ardenne, Reims and in 2012 'Swing Project 2' at Galerie Neu, Berlin. In 2013 they participated in the Fiorucci Art Trust 'Volcano Extravaganza', Stromboli. In 2014 they exhibited 'Swing Project 3' at the Cabinet Gallery, London.

== Selected record and CD covers by Saville ==
- Joy Division – Unknown Pleasures, 1979
- Joy Division – "Transmission", 1979
- Joy Division – "Love Will Tear Us Apart", 1980
- Joy Division – Closer, 1980
- Martha and the Muffins – Metro Music, 1980
- The Monochrome Set – Strange Boutique, 1980
- Orchestral Manoeuvres in the Dark – Orchestral Manoeuvres in the Dark, (with interior designer Ben Kelly) February 1980
- Orchestral Manoeuvres in the Dark – Organisation, October 1980
- Roxy Music – Flesh and Blood, 1980
- David Byrne and Brian Eno – My Life in the Bush of Ghosts, 1981
- Joy Division – Still, 1981
- New Order – "Ceremony", 1981
- New Order – Movement, 1981
- Orchestral Manoeuvres in the Dark – Architecture & Morality, 1981
- Section 25 – Always Now, 1981
- Ultravox – Rage in Eden, 1981
- King Crimson – Discipline, 1981
- Roxy Music – Avalon, 1982
- New Order – "Temptation", 1982
- New Order – "Blue Monday", 1983
- New Order – Power, Corruption & Lies, 1983
- Orchestral Manoeuvres in the Dark – Dazzle Ships, 1983
- Orchestral Manoeuvres in the Dark – Junk Culture, 1984
- New Order – Low-Life, 1985
- Peter Gabriel – So, 1986
- Wham! – Music from the Edge of Heaven, 1986
- New Order – Brotherhood, 1986
- New Order – "Bizarre Love Triangle", 1986
- New Order – "True Faith", 1987
- New Order – Substance, 1987
- Joy Division – Substance, 1988
- New Order – Technique, 1989
- New Order – Republic, 1993
- Suede – Coming Up, 1996
- New Order – Video 5 8 6, 1997
- Pulp – This Is Hardcore, 1998
- Suede – Head Music, 1999
- Gay Dad – Leisure Noise, 1999
- The Other Two – Super Highways, 1999
- Pulp – We Love Life, 2001
- New Order – Get Ready, 2001
- New Order – Waiting for the Sirens' Call, 2005
- Brett Anderson – Brett Anderson, 2007
- Orchestral Manoeuvres in the Dark – History of Modern, 2010
- New Order – Music Complete, 2015
- Julia Sinclair and Marijn Cinjee – Wind Takes Flight, 2025

== See also ==
- Pioneers of Modern Typography
