= Gillian Gilbert =

English musician (born 1961)

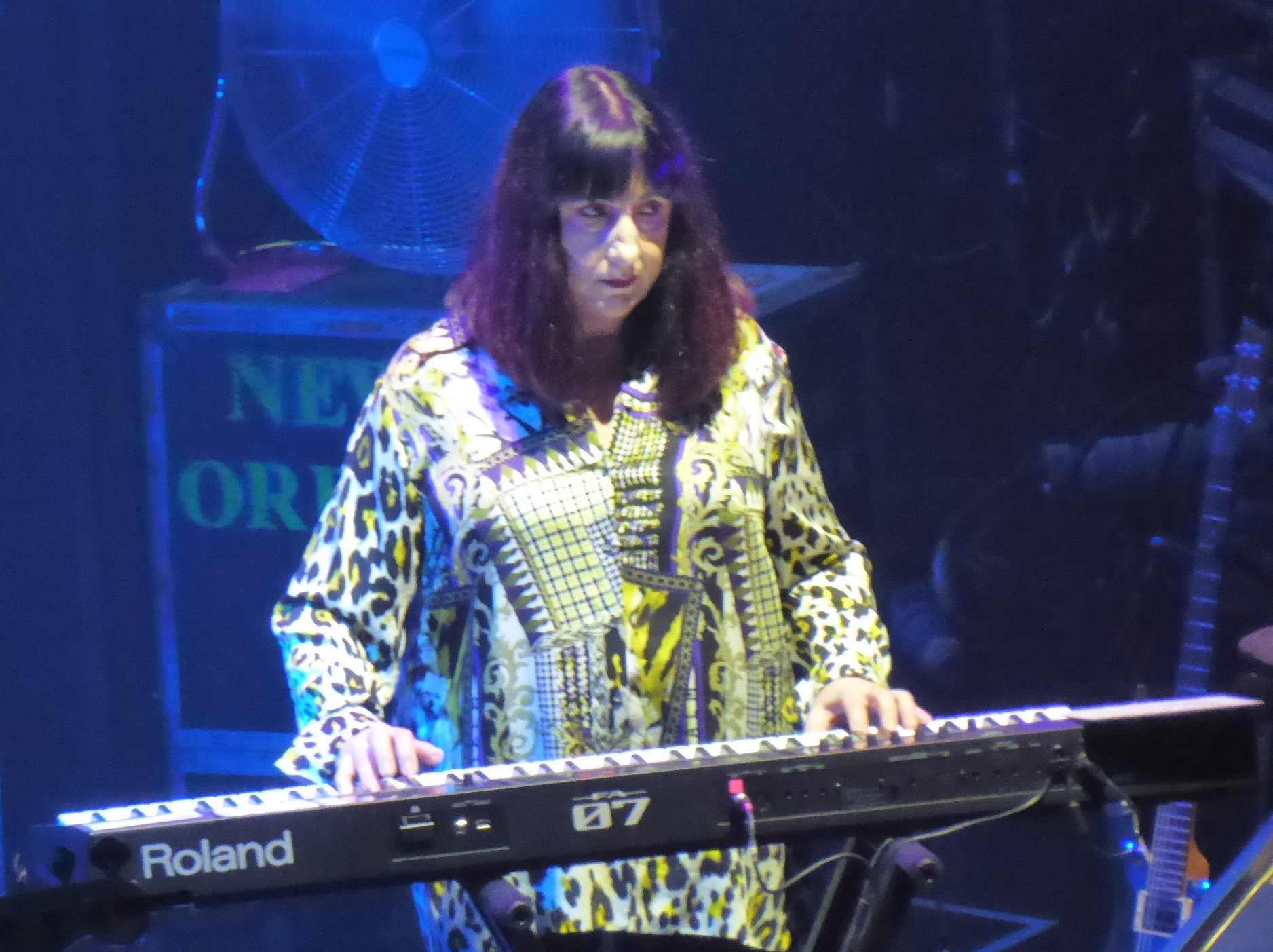
- Gilbert on stage with New Order in 2019

Background information
- Born: Gillian Lesley Gilbert; 27 January 1961 (age 65); Whalley Range, Manchester, England
- Genres: New wave; synth-pop; post-punk; alternative dance; alternative rock; electronic
- Occupations: Musician; singer
- Instruments: Keyboards; guitar; vocals
- Member of: New Order; The Other Two
- Spouse: Stephen Morris (m. 1994)

Gillian Lesley Gilbert (born 27 January 1961) is an English musician. She is the keyboardist and guitarist of the band New Order. In 2026, Gilbert was inducted into the Rock and Roll Hall of Fame as a member of New Order after two previous nominations.

== Early life ==
Gilbert's family moved from her birthplace, Manchester, to the nearby market town of Macclesfield when she was young. She disliked living in Cheshire as a teenager and had wanted to live in Manchester. In the late 1970s, seeing Siouxsie and the Banshees play live on UK television was a life changing experience for her. "Me dad always says to us, 'You changed as soon as you saw Siouxsie and the Banshees on television'... And I really liked Gaye Advert out of the Adverts, who played bass, and I thought, 'Oh, there's nobody playin' guitar' - you know, women in bands." Her uncle taught her how to play guitar.

Gilbert was then in a punk band with three girls, the Inadequates, who rehearsed at premises next to Joy Division. In a 1987 interview with Option, Gilbert reflected on the first time she became familiar with Joy Division: "We didn't have a car and us three needed a lift home. So we asked them, and they said, 'Alright, but you have to buy one of our singles.' So we did and got it home and played it on this horrible record player. We'd known Stephen before. We thought, 'My God, this sounds horrible.'" She would later begin dating and eventually marry Morris.

== Career ==
After Ian Curtis's death in May 1980, the three remaining members of Joy Division started a new band called New Order. Wishing to complete their line-up with someone they knew well and whose musical skill and style was compatible with their own, New Order invited Gilbert to join the band during the early part of October 1980, as keyboardist and guitarist. She had already played with Joy Division a number of times, filling in for both Curtis and Bernard Sumner playing guitar. New Order's manager Rob Gretton suggested she should join. Gilbert's first live performance with them occurred at The Squat in Manchester on 25 October 1980.

Gilbert's voice can be heard on several New Order tracks: the 1981 single "Procession"; the 1983 single "Confusion"; "Avalanche" from the album Republic on which she sang a single word, "faith"; and "Doubts Even Here" from their first album, Movement, on which she provided a spoken-word background vocal.

Fellow band members Sumner and Peter Hook had already produced music outside New Order, when Gilbert and Morris formed their own band, The Other Two. They released their first single "Tasty Fish" in 1991. The Other Two also recorded two albums: The Other Two & You, released in 1993, and Super Highways in 1999. Gilbert stopped touring with New Order in 1998 so that she could care for their children, one of whom suffers from neuromyelitis optica. Her husband had briefly offered to care for the children, but Gilbert reasoned that it would be easier for the band to replace her than her husband. Gilbert participated in the recording of 2001's Get Ready, after which she was replaced by Phil Cunningham in New Order's line-up.

In 2007, Gilbert and Morris remixed two tracks for the Nine Inch Nails remixes album Year Zero Remixed. That year, Gilbert was diagnosed with breast cancer, from which she recovered.

Gilbert re-joined New Order in 2011, after a 10-year absence from their albums. The band had initially reformed, after 4 years, to play two benefit gigs for Michael Schamberg, video-producer and long-time friend. Speaking in a 2021 interview, Gilbert explained; "It was up to me whether I wanted to carry on, really. It seemed quite pleasant at the time, so yeah, just went for it". Gilbert performed alongside Cunningham (who remained a member), expanding the group to a quintet. Gilbert is quoted as saying that she felt glad that she had done other things during her time away from the band. Speaking about recording new material, Gilbert explained; "I figured doing an EP might be OK, but Bernard wanted to do a whole record. That made me think about the bad old days, especially Get Ready, when I'd been glad to get out of it all. But the bad old relationships around Factory had gone, which had caused a lot of problems with a hierarchy becoming established within the band. Phil and Tom are very easy-going. It was a refreshing new start, where I felt that I could do anything – so I did. I came in to Music Complete with a lot of ideas, and it was a record where everyone's ideas were thrown in together."

Since 2011, New Order have performed across the world. Their album Music Complete was released in September 2015. Gilbert's vocals were featured on a Koishii & Hush remix album titled Lifetime; it was released on 3 February 2016, and featured four tracks remixed by artists such as Saltmarine, Lavigne, FM Attack and Re:Locate. In 2021 Gilbert contributed to a band interview reflecting on the previous 10 years of New Order.

== Personal life ==
Gilbert and Morris were engaged in 1993, and married the following year. The couple live in Rainow, outside Macclesfield, and have two daughters.

In June 2026, both Gilbert and Morris withdrew from touring with New Order for personal health reasons. After Morris told Rolling Stone in September of that year that he had a "pretty serious" health issue impacting his ability to participate in the band's activities, Gilbert clarified on 15 September 2026 that she was the one with the illness, having been undergoing treatment for cancer.

== Discography ==
=== With The Other Two ===
- The Other Two & You (1993)
- Super Highways (1999)
