= Go Station =

Go Station may refer to:

- The GoStation, an American rock band
- Any station in the GO Transit system, in the Greater Toronto and Hamilton Area, Ontario, Canada
