= The GoStation =

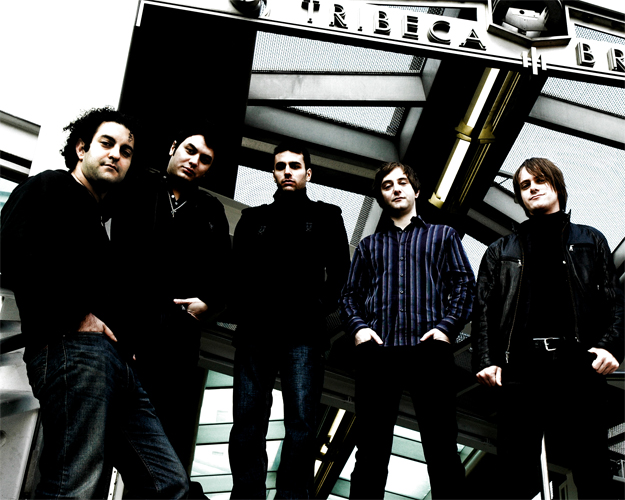

Background information
- Origin: New York City, New York, United States
- Years active: 2003-2009
- Label: Edge Delay
- Members: Doug Levy; Matt Friedlander; Nick Picozzi; Erik Nyquist; Vin Russoniello
- Past members: Joel Frost; Justin Aaronson; Alex Koch
- Website: thegostation.com

The GoStation was an American indie-rock band from New York City.

== History ==
=== Membership ===
Singer Doug Levy and guitarist Matt Friedlander met while the latter was a student at New York University. The two had similar tastes in music and favorite bands.

The two began writing songs together and joined with original drummer Joel Frost (whom Friedlander knew from a band they were previously in together, The Stamps). Bassist Nick Picozzi followed shortly after, along with original rhythm guitar player Alex Koch (who went on to front his own band, The Walkup). When Koch left, the band briefly continued as a quartet.

Frost left the band in late 2005, and the group brought in new drummer Justin Aaronson (formerly of Surefire) and Erik Nyquist on rhythm guitar. This is the lineup that recorded the band's debut album, Passion Before Function, released on Edge Delay records. In 2007, Justin Aaronson left the band, being replaced by drummer Vin Russoniello.

=== Performances and recordings ===
The GoStation began playing concerts in and around NYC in the summer of 2003. Their first show was at one of New York's most prestigious rock clubs at the time, The Knitting Factory. Their first release, Quiet Zone, was a 5-song EP released on July 2, 2005, on Edge Delay Records.

The band's debut album, Passion Before Function was released on September 25, 2007, in the U.S. through Edge Delay Records. It was also released in Japan on July 18, 2007, through Fabtone Records.

The last official release from the GoStation was a non-album single, "Berlin Rose," recorded with legendary producer Jack Douglas. The B-side was a studio version of the band's cover of "True Faith" by New Order, which also featured as a bonus track on the Japanese release of Passion Before Function.

In 2016, the GoStation released a series of demos for tracks for free that were originally slated to appear on their sophomore album. These include "Sooner or Later," "The Strangest Things," and "Carry Me Out."

== Discography ==
=== Studio albums ===
Passion Before Function (2007)

=== Extended plays ===
Quiet Zone EP (2005)

=== Digital singles ===
"Berlin Rose" / "True Faith" (2009)
