= List of songs recorded by Joy Division =

Songs recorded by Joy Division

Joy Division were an English post-punk band that consisted of singer Ian Curtis, guitarist and keyboardist Bernard Sumner, bassist Peter Hook and drummer Stephen Morris. From 1976 to 1980, the band recorded a total of 53 songs, all of which were credited to all four members of the group, with one exception, and almost all were produced by Martin Hannett. Although together for only four years, the band has influenced many artists and the post-punk movement of the late 1970s.

Originally known as Warsaw, Joy Division released their debut extended play, An Ideal for Living, in June 1978, which showcased the group's early punk roots. The song "At a Later Date" was released on the compilation Short Circuit: Live at the Electric Circus two weeks later. Their debut studio album, Unknown Pleasures, was released in June 1979. The album's production by Hannett is noted for its unusual methods, such as emphasising space and sound effects such as glass breaking. Its songs are described by AllMusic as "visceral, emotional, and theatrical." The album failed to gain commercial success until the release of their debut single "Transmission". However, Curtis's health began to decline as he suffered from depression and epilepsy. His condition never improved and on 18 May 1980, Curtis hanged himself in his kitchen. The posthumous single, "Love Will Tear Us Apart", was released a month later, while their final album, Closer, followed in July. Closer featured songs that were more choppy and "crumbled up" than its predecessor, and its sound is more "chaotic". Before Curtis' death, the band made an agreement that should any member leave for any reason, the group would disband. Because of this, Joy Division officially ceased later that year. Morris, Sumner and Hook subsequently teamed with Morris' then-girlfriend Gillian Gilbert and formed New Order. Their debut single, "Ceremony" and its B-side, "In a Lonely Place", were two of the final songs written by Joy Division before their dissolution.

In 1981, the first compilation album Still was released. The album contained previously unreleased songs and live recordings, including a recording of "Ceremony" and a live cover of the Velvet Underground song "Sister Ray". In 1988, the compilation album Substance saw the release of previous non-album singles "Love Will Tear Us Apart" and "Transmission", among other songs. Its release coincided with the release of New Order's singles compilation, also titled Substance, a year prior. In 1994, Joy Division released their planned debut album under the name "Warsaw". The album contained many previously unreleased songs and was recorded in 1977 when the band was still known as Warsaw. Later compilations released by the band include 1995's Permanent, 1997's box set Heart and Soul, 2008's The Best of Joy Division and 2011's Total: From Joy Division to New Order, which featured five Joy Division tracks and thirteen New Order tracks.

== Songs ==
All songs written by Ian Curtis, Bernard Sumner, Peter Hook and Stephen Morris, except where noted.
All songs produced by Martin Hannett, except An Ideal for Living, produced by Joy Division.

Key
†	Indicates single release

Name of song, original release, and year of release
Song	Original release	Year	Ref(s)
"As You Said" †	Non-album single B-side to "Komakino"	1980	
"At a Later Date" (live)	Short Circuit: Live at the Electric Circus	1978	
"Atmosphere" (Note: "Atmosphere" was released in 1980 in France under the title "Licht und Blindheit" on the Sordide Sentimental label.) †	Non-album single A-side to "She's Lost Control" (UK); B-side to "She's Lost Control" (US)	1980	
"Atrocity Exhibition"	Closer	1980	
"Auto-suggestion"	Earcom 2: Contradiction (EP)	1979	
"Candidate"	Unknown Pleasures	1979	
"Ceremony" (live)	Still	1981	
"Colony"	Closer	1980	
"Day of the Lords"	Unknown Pleasures	1979	
"Dead Souls"	Licht und Blindheit	1980	
"Decades"	Closer	1980	
"Digital"	A Factory Sample (EP)	1978	
"Disorder"	Unknown Pleasures	1979	
"The Drawback" (Note: Released under the name "Warsaw")	Warsaw	1994	
"The Eternal"	Closer	1980	
"Exercise One"	Still	1981	
"Failures"	An Ideal for Living (EP)	1977	
"From Safety to Where...?"	Earcom 2: Contradiction (EP)	1979	
"Glass"	A Factory Sample (EP)	1978	
"Gutz"	Warsaw	1994	
"Heart and Soul"	Closer	1980	
"I Remember Nothing"	Unknown Pleasures	1979	
"Ice Age"	Still	1981	
"In a Lonely Place (Detail)" (demo)	Heart and Soul	1997	
"Incubation" †	Non-album single B-side to "Komakino"	1980	
"Inside the Line"	Warsaw	1994	
"Insight"	Unknown Pleasures	1979	
"Interzone"	Unknown Pleasures	1979	
"Isolation"	Closer	1980	
"The Kill"	Still	1981	
"Komakino" †	Non-album single	1980	
"Leaders of Men"	An Ideal for Living (EP)	1977	
"(Living in the) Ice Age"	Still	1981	
"Love Will Tear Us Apart" †	Non-album single	1980	
"A Means to an End"	Closer	1980	
"New Dawn Fades"	Unknown Pleasures	1979	
"No Love Lost"	An Ideal for Living (EP)	1978	
"Novelty" †	Non-album single B-side to "Transmission"	1979	
"The Only Mistake"	Still	1981	
"Passover"	Closer	1980	
"Shadowplay"	Unknown Pleasures	1979	
"She's Lost Control (12" version)" †	Non album single A-side to "Atmosphere" (US); B-side to "Atmosphere" (UK)	1980	
"She's Lost Control"	Unknown Pleasures	1979	
"Sister Ray" (Note: Written by the Velvet Underground (John Cale, Sterling Morrison, Lou Reed and Maureen Tucker).) (live) (The Velvet Underground cover)	Still	1981	
"Something Must Break"	Still	1981	
"The Sound of Music"	Still	1981	
"These Days" †	Non-album single B-side to "Love Will Tear Us Apart"	1980	
"They Walked in Line"	Warsaw	1994	
"Transmission" †	Non-album single	1979	
"Twenty Four Hours"	Closer	1980	
"Walked in Line"	Still	1981	
"Warsaw"	An Ideal for Living (EP)	1977	
"Wilderness"	Unknown Pleasures	1979	
"You're No Good for Me"	Warsaw	1994	

== Bibliography ==
- Curtis, Deborah (1995). Touching from a Distance: Ian Curtis and Joy Division. London: Faber. ISBN 0-571-17445-0.

== See also ==
- Joy Division Singles Discography
- Joy Division discography
