= Heart and Soul (Joy Division album) =

Box set by Joy Division
- Released: December 1997
- Recorded: 14 December 1977 – 14 May 1980
- Genre: Post-punk
- Length: 308:02
- Label: London (UK); Rhino (US)
- Producer: Martin Hannett

Joy Division compilations chronology
Permanent (1995)	Heart and Soul (1997)	Preston 28 February 1980 (1999)

Professional ratings
Review scores
Source	Rating
AllMusic	4.5/5 stars

Heart and Soul is a box set by English rock band Joy Division containing nearly every track the band recorded between 1977 and 1980. The first two discs contain almost their entire studio output, including the albums Unknown Pleasures and Closer; it also features singles and compilation appearances. Discs three and four collect rare demos and live recordings, many of which were previously unreleased. All tracks are digitally remastered. It reached #70 in the UK.

== Track listing ==
All songs written by Ian Curtis, Bernard Sumner, Peter Hook and Stephen Morris.

Disc 1: Unknown Pleasures Plus (All tracks previously released)
No.	Title	Release	Length
1.	"Digital"	A Factory Sample	2:53
2.	"Glass"	A Factory Sample	3:56
3.	"Disorder"	Unknown Pleasures	3:31
4.	"Day of the Lords"	Unknown Pleasures	4:49
5.	"Candidate"	Unknown Pleasures	3:05
6.	"Insight"	Unknown Pleasures	4:28
7.	"New Dawn Fades"	Unknown Pleasures	4:48
8.	"She's Lost Control"	Unknown Pleasures	3:56
9.	"Shadowplay"	Unknown Pleasures	3:55
10.	"Wilderness"	Unknown Pleasures	2:38
11.	"Interzone"	Unknown Pleasures	2:16
12.	"I Remember Nothing"	Unknown Pleasures	5:56
13.	"Ice Age"	Still	2:25
14.	"Exercise One"	Still	3:08
15.	"Transmission"	Substance	3:37
16.	"Novelty"	Substance	4:01
17.	"The Kill"	Still	2:16
18.	"The Only Mistake"	Still	4:19
19.	"Something Must Break"	Still	2:53
20.	"Autosuggestion"	Earcom 2: Contradiction	6:10
21.	"From Safety to Where...?"	Earcom 2: Contradiction	2:27

Disc 2: Closer Plus (All tracks previously released)
No.	Title	Release	Length
1.	"She's Lost Control (12" version)"	Substance	4:57
2.	"Sound of Music"	Still	3:55
3.	"Atmosphere"	Substance	4:11
4.	"Dead Souls"	Substance	4:57
5.	"Komakino"	Substance	3:54
6.	"Incubation"	Substance	2:52
7.	"Atrocity Exhibition"	Closer	6:05
8.	"Isolation"	Closer	2:52
9.	"Passover"	Closer	4:46
10.	"Colony"	Closer	3:55
11.	"A Means to an End"	Closer	4:07
12.	"Heart and Soul"	Closer	5:51
13.	"Twenty Four Hours"	Closer	4:26
14.	"The Eternal"	Closer	6:07
15.	"Decades"	Closer	6:13
16.	"Love Will Tear Us Apart"	Substance	3:27
17.	"These Days"	Substance	3:26

Disc 3: Rarities
No.	Title	Release	Length
1.	"Warsaw"	An Ideal for Living	2:26
2.	"No Love Lost"	An Ideal for Living	3:42
3.	"Leaders of Men"	An Ideal for Living	2:34
4.	"Failures"	An Ideal for Living	3:44
5.	"The Drawback (Demo)"	Previously unreleased	1:46
6.	"Interzone (Demo)"	Previously unreleased	2:11
7.	"Shadowplay (Demo)"	Previously unreleased	4:10
8.	"Exercise One (Peel Session)"	The Peel Sessions	2:28
9.	"Insight (Demo)"	Previously unreleased	4:05
10.	"Glass (Demo)"	Previously unreleased	3:29
11.	"Transmission (Demo)"	Previously unreleased	3:51
12.	"Dead Souls (Outtake)"	Previously unreleased	4:55
13.	"Something Must Break (Rough Mix)"	Previously unreleased	2:53
14.	"Ice Age (Demo)"	Previously unreleased	2:36
15.	"Walked in Line (Rough Mix)"	Previously unreleased	2:46
16.	"These Days (Piccadilly Radio Session)"	Previously unreleased	3:27
17.	"Candidate (Piccadilly Radio Session)"	Previously unreleased	1:57
18.	"The Only Mistake (Piccadilly Radio Session)"	Previously unreleased	3:43
19.	"Chance (Atmosphere) (Piccadilly Radio Session)"	Previously unreleased	4:54
20.	"Love Will Tear Us Apart (Peel Session)"	The Peel Sessions	3:22
21.	"Colony (Peel Session)"	The Peel Sessions	4:03
22.	"As You Said"	Substance	2:01
23.	"Ceremony (Demo)"	Previously unreleased	4:57
24.	"In a Lonely Place (Detail) (Demo)"	Previously unreleased	2:26

Disc 4: Live (All tracks previously unreleased)
No.	Title	Recording source	Length
1.	"Dead Souls"	13 July 1979 at The Factory	4:17
2.	"The Only Mistake"	13 July 1979 at The Factory	4:04
3.	"Insight"	13 July 1979 at The Factory	3:48
4.	"Candidate"	13 July 1979 at The Factory	2:03
5.	"Wilderness"	13 July 1979 at The Factory	2:27
6.	"She's Lost Control"	13 July 1979 at The Factory	3:38
7.	"Disorder"	13 July 1979 at The Factory	3:12
8.	"Interzone"	13 July 1979 at The Factory	2:03
9.	"Atrocity Exhibition"	13 July 1979 at The Factory	5:52
10.	"Novelty"	13 July 1979 at The Factory	4:27
11.	"Autosuggestion"	2 August 1979 at Prince of Wales Conference Centre	4:05
12.	"I Remember Nothing"	2 Nov 1979 at Bournemouth Winter Gardens	5:53
13.	"Colony"	2 Nov 1979 at Bournemouth Winter Gardens	3:53
14.	"These Days"	2 Nov 1979 at Bournemouth Winter Gardens	3:38
15.	"Incubation"	29 February 1980 at Lyceum London	3:36
16.	"The Eternal"	29 February 1980 at Lyceum London	6:33
17.	"Heart and Soul"	29 February 1980 at Lyceum London	4:56
18.	"Isolation"	29 February 1980 at Lyceum London	3:09
19.	"She's Lost Control"	29 February 1980 at Lyceum London	5:30

== Missing tracks ==
The following recordings were not included on Heart and Soul:

- Five tracks of the very first demo session in July 1977 at Pennine Sound Studios, Oldham, when the band was still called Warsaw: "Inside the Line", "Gutz", "At a Later Date", "The Kill" and "You're No Good for Me". First released on the Warsaw album in 1994.
- Live track "At a Later Date" recorded in October 1977 at the Electric Circus, Manchester. First released on the Short Circuit EP in 1978.
- Eight more tracks from the unreleased RCA album sessions in May 1978 at Arrow Studios, Manchester: "Leaders of Men", "Walked in Line", "Failures", "Novelty", "No Love Lost", "Transmission", "Ice Age" and "Warsaw". First released on the Warsaw album in 1994.
- Three more tracks from the first Peel Session in January 1979: "Insight", "Transmission" and "She's Lost Control". First released on The Peel Sessions in 1986.
- Additional track "Digital" from the demo-session in March 1979 at Eden Studios, London. Remains unreleased.
- The re-mixed version of "Walked in Line" which was released on the Still album in 1981.
- Additional track "Atrocity Exhibition" from the Piccadilly Radio session in June 1979 at Pennine Sound Studios, Oldham. Remains unreleased.
- Two more tracks from the first session for the "Transmission" single at Central Sound Studios, Manchester, in July 1979: "Transmission" and "Novelty". The recordings of the same songs from a second session in the same month were released as the single. The two tracks from the first session remain unreleased.
- Two live tracks from a TV appearance on BBC2's Something Else in September 1979: "Transmission" and "She's Lost Control". First released on Joy Division The Complete BBC Recordings in 2000.
- Two more tracks from the second Peel Session in November 1979: "The Sound of Music" and "Twenty Four Hours". First released on The Peel Sessions in 1987.
- The B-side version of "Love Will Tear Us Apart", recorded in January 1980 at Pennine Sound Studios, Oldham. First released on the Love Will Tear Us Apart single in 1980.
- Live track "Sister Ray" a Velvet Underground cover, from a concert at the Moonlight Club, West Hampstead on 2 April 1980, released on Still in 1981.
- Eleven live tracks from Birmingham University, recorded 2 May 1980, first released on Still in 1981.
- The live tracks released on the live albums Preston 28 February 1980 in 1999 and Les Bains Douches 18 December 1979 in 2001.
- Live tracks "Shadowplay" and "Transmission", recorded 13 July 1979 at the Factory, Manchester. "Transmission" was first released on the CD format of the re-release of the "Atmosphere" single in 1988. "Shadowplay" was not released until the 2007 reissue of Unknown Pleasures which also contains "Transmission".
- Live tracks "Love Will Tear Us Apart" and "Glass", recorded at the Moonlight Club, West Hampstead, which appear on the test pressing of the bonus disc for the 2007 reissue of Unknown Pleasures, but not on the issued disc. The tracks are probably from the concert on 2 April 1980, at which the cover of "Sister Ray" which appears on Still was recorded.
- Twelve live tracks from the University of London, recorded 8 February 1980, not released until the 2007 reissue of Closer.
- Eight live tracks and six sound check tracks from the High Wycombe Town Hall (not to be confused with the High Hall at Birmingham University), not released until the 2007 reissue of Still.
- The full-length studio recording of "In a Lonely Place", not released until Record Store Day 2011 as part of a double B-side to a double A-side 12" vinyl reissue of the New Order version of "Ceremony".

== Release history ==
Country	Date
United Kingdom	8 December 1997
United States	28 August 2001
