= Permanent (Joy Division album) =

Compilation album by Joy Division
- Released: 19 June 1995
- Genre: Post-punk
- Length: 64:53
- Label: London
- Producer: Martin Hannett

Joy Division compilations chronology
Warsaw (1994)	Permanent (1995)	Heart and Soul (1997)

Permanent is a compilation album by English post-punk band Joy Division. It was released in the United Kingdom on 19 June 1995 by London Records and in the United States on 15 August 1995 by Qwest Records and Warner Bros. Records. The album charted for three weeks and peaked at number 16 on the UK Albums Chart.

== Songs ==
Permanent contains tracks from the band's two studio albums, Unknown Pleasures and Closer, as well as other tracks previously released on the compilations Substance and Still.

The album contained one new track and one track that was previously unavailable on LP. The new track was a new mix of "Love Will Tear Us Apart" titled "Permanent mix". This version of the song features guitar throughout, balancing the synths and bass. The track that was previously unavailable on LP was the "Pennine version" of "Love Will Tear Us Apart", which was originally released as one of the B-sides on the "Love Will Tear Us Apart" single and was used in place of the regular version. The "Pennine version" label had not yet come into use at the time of the album's release (it would not do so until the release of the expanded edition of Substance in 2015), and the track is not listed as being an alternate version at all. The liner notes (first on a Joy Division album) were provided by Jon Savage.

== Critical reception ==
Professional ratings
Review scores
Source	Rating
AllMusic	3/5 stars
Encyclopedia of Popular Music	4/5 stars
Entertainment Weekly	A−

Entertainment Weekly critic Josef Woodard deemed Permanent a "still-vital compilation" that showcases Joy Division's "cool, beyond-punk voltage beneath Curtis' murmurings." Robert Christgau from The Village Voice said although others revered Ian Curtis' despair, he himself preferred how the band was showcased on the compilation, finding it complementary to 1995's The Best of New Order. Stephen Thomas Erlewine was less enthusiastic in his review for AllMusic. He believed it was less useful than the 1988 compilation Substance and the studio albums it compiles tracks from, even though there is "a wealth of brilliant music".

== Track listing ==
All tracks written by Joy Division.

1. "Love Will Tear Us Apart (Pennine version)"^{1} – 3:11
2. "Transmission" – 3:34
3. "She's Lost Control" – 3:58
4. "Shadowplay" – 3:53
5. "Day of the Lords" – 4:45
6. "Isolation" – 2:53
7. "Passover" – 4:44
8. "Heart and Soul" – 5:48
9. "Twenty Four Hours" – 4:26
10. "These Days" – 3:27
11. "Novelty" – 4:00
12. "Dead Souls" – 4:53
13. "The Only Mistake" – 4:13
14. "Something Must Break" – 2:52
15. "Atmosphere" – 4:10
16. "Love Will Tear Us Apart (Permanent Mix)" – 3:37

^{1} Not listed as being alternate version at all

=== Notes ===
- Tracks 1 and 10 first released on the "Love Will Tear Us Apart" single in 1980.
- Tracks 2 and 11 first released on the "Transmission" single in 1979.
- Tracks 3 to 5 first released on the Unknown Pleasures album in 1979.
- Tracks 6 to 9 first released on the Closer album in 1980.
- Track 12 and 15 first released on the "Licht und Blindheit" single in 1980.
- Tracks 13 and 14 first released on the Still album in 1981.
- Track 16 previously unreleased.

== Personnel ==
- Martin Hannett – producer
- Joy Division – producer
- Don Gehman – additional production and remix: Track 16
  - Ian Curtis – vocals
  - Peter Hook – bass
  - Stephen Morris – drums
  - Bernard Sumner – guitar
- John Savage – liner notes

== Certifications ==
Region	Certification	Certified units/sales
United Kingdom (BPI)	Gold	100,000^{*}
^{*} Sales figures based on certification alone.
