= Warsaw (album) =

Compilation album by Warsaw (Joy Division)
- Released: 1980
- Recorded: 1977; 1978; 1980
- Genre: Punk rock
- Label: MPG
- Producer: Bob Auger; John Anderson; Joy Division

Joy Division compilations chronology
Warsaw (1980)	Still (1981)

Professional ratings
Review scores
Source	Rating
AllMusic	4/5 stars

Warsaw was the planned debut album by the English post-punk band Joy Division, while they were briefly associated with RCA Records. Recorded in May 1978, it comprised eleven tracks now known collectively as the "RCA Sessions". However, the band were disappointed with the label's post-production work and the deal fell through, the album being scrapped.

Four of the songs recorded during the RCA sessions had previously been recorded at the end of 1977, and it was these older recordings that the band would release the following month as their debut An Ideal for Living EP.

The RCA sessions circulated on bootleg releases for years, generally bearing the Warsaw title. They appear alongside "As You Said" from the 1980 "Komakino" single, as well as the band's first recorded music, the five "Warsaw Demo" tracks from 1977, which are noted on the sleeve as "bonus tracks".

== Track listing ==
All tracks written by Warsaw/Joy Division.

=== The RCA Sessions ===
1. "The Drawback" – 1:42 later released on Heart and Soul
2. "Leaders of Men" – 2:28
3. "Walked in Line" – 2:50
4. "Failures" – 2:22
5. "Novelty" – 3:36
6. "No Love Lost" – 4:34
7. "Transmission" – 4:20
8. "Living in the Ice Age" – 2:19
9. "Interzone" – 2:02 later released on Unknown Pleasures and Heart and Soul
10. "Warsaw" – 2:06
11. "Shadowplay" – 3:53 later released on Unknown Pleasures and Heart and Soul

=== From "Komakino" ===
12. "As You Said" – 2:01 originally released on the "Komakino" single

=== The Warsaw Demo ===
13. "Inside the Line" – 2:43
14. "Gutz" – 1:59
15. "At a Later Date" – 3:14
16. "The Kill" – 2:08
17. "You're No Good for Me" – 2:03

== Personnel ==
Personnel per Warsaw liner notes.

- Ian Curtis – vocals
- Bernard Sumner (credited as Bernard Albrecht) – guitar
- Peter Hook – bass
- Stephen Morris – drums
- Steve Brotherdale – drums on "The Warsaw Demo" tracks

== Notes ==
- Tracks 1–11 recorded at Arrow Studios, Manchester, 3–4 May 1978
- Track 12 recorded at Britannia Row Studios, Islington, London, March 1980
- Tracks 13–17 recorded at Pennine Sound Studios, Manchester, 18 July 1977
