= Atrocity Exhibition =

Atrocity Exhibition may refer to:

- The Atrocity Exhibition, the book by English author J. G. Ballard, published in 1970
- The Atrocity Exhibition... Exhibit A, the eighth studio album by American metal band Exodus, released in 2007

- "The Atrocity Exhibition", the title track from the album

- Atrocity Exhibition (album), the fourth studio album by American hip hop artist Danny Brown, released in 2016
- "Atrocity Exhibition" (song), the opening song of English rock band Joy Division's second and final studio album Closer, released in 1980
