= Ridgeline plot =

Data graphic

A ridgeline plot (also known as a joyplot (Note: The name Joyplot is derived from the use of a Ridgeline plot of the intensity of pulses from a pulsar on the front of Joy Division's album Unknown Pleasures.)) is a series of line plots that are combined by vertical stacking to allow the easy visualization of changes through space or time. The plots are often overlapped slightly to allow the changes to be more clearly contrasted.

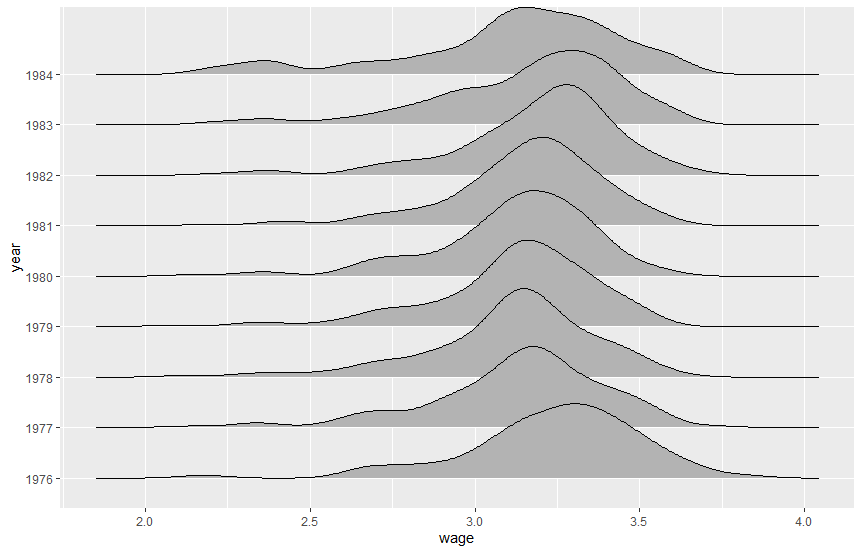
An example of a ridgeline plot showing the distributions of wages for a sample of firms over a series of years from a panel data set
