= Atrocity Exhibition (song) =

Song by Joy Division

Song by Joy Division

from the album Closer
- Released: 1980
- Recorded: 18–30 March 1980
- Studio: Britannia Row, London
- Genre: Post-punk; gothic rock
- Length: 6:07
- Label: Factory
- Songwriters: Ian Curtis; Peter Hook; Bernard Sumner; Stephen Morris
- Producers: Martin Hannett, Joy Division

"Atrocity Exhibition" is a song by the English post-punk band Joy Division. It is the opening track on their second and final album Closer. The song was produced by Martin Hannett and Joy Division. It was recorded at Pink Floyd's Britannia Row Studios in London.

The song title was inspired by the 1970 J. G. Ballard collection of "condensed novels" of the same name. Ned Raggett of AllMusic described it as "one of the least likely opening songs from any album—even if the core chorus from Ian Curtis is 'This is the way, step inside'".

== Writing and recording ==
The song was originally recorded at Pennine Studios for a Piccadilly Radio Session on 4 June 1979. It subsequently featured in live sets before being recorded for the Closer sessions. As with most other Joy Division songs, it was written by jamming in their practice room. Bassist Peter Hook and guitarist Bernard Sumner swapped instruments when writing and recording the track; according to Hook, they "were bored writing on our instruments so we just thought let's swap. Barney played bass and I played guitar. I was nowhere as proficient a guitarist as him, mind you, but I liked the way it sounds. Great riff, great bass too."

Hannett's production has been highly praised, with Pitchfork describing it as "sepulchral". However, as with their debut album Unknown Pleasures, both Hook and Sumner were unhappy with Hannett's work. Hook said that the track was mixed on one of his days off, and when he heard the final product was disappointed that the abrasiveness of his guitar part had been laden with effects and toned down. He wrote; "I was like, head in hands, 'Oh fucking hell, it's happening again. Unknown Pleasures number two ... Martin [Hannett] had fucking melted the guitar with his Marshall Time Waster. Made it sound like someone strangling a cat and, to my mind, absolutely killed the song. I was so annoyed with him and went in and gave him a piece of my mind but he just turned round and told me to fuck off".

== Influence ==
The track, especially Stephen Morris's tribal drum pattern, seems influenced by krautrock band Can. According to Raggett, "Morris's drumming has more than a little off-kilter pound and swing to things, while instead of the dramatic foregrounding of those beats he so often does, Martin Hannett pushes them a bit back in the mix, strong but a bit subordinate".

The Northern Irish alternative metal band Therapy? used many musical elements of the song on their cover of another Joy Division song, "Isolation".

The single inspired the name of Danny Brown's 2016 album Atrocity Exhibition. Brown stated that the name was taken from both Ballard's collection and the song.

== Sources ==
- Hook, Peter (2013). Unknown Pleasures. Inside Joy Division. London: Simon & Schuster. ISBN 978-1-4711-2980-3.
- Savage, Jon (2014). So This is Permanence: Joy Division Lyrics and Notebooks. Faber & Faber. ISBN 978-0-5713-0955-9.
- Sumner, Bernard (2014). Chapter and Verse - New Order, Joy Division and Me. New York City: Random House. ISBN 978-1-448-17132-3.
