= Ceremony (New Order song) =

1981 single

- Sleeve for first version of 12-inch single, by Peter Saville

Single by New Order
- B-side: "In a Lonely Place"
- Released: March 1981
- Genre: New wave; post-punk
- Length: 4:34 (original); 4:23 (re-recorded)
- Label: Factory
- Songwriters: Ian Curtis; Peter Hook; Stephen Morris; Bernard Sumner
- Producer: Martin Hannett

New Order singles chronology
"Ceremony" (1981)	"Procession" (1981)

Alternate cover
- Sleeve for the second version of the 12-inch single

"Ceremony"

Song by Joy Division

from the album Still
- Released: 8 October 1981
- Recorded: 2 May 1980
- Venue: High Hall, Birmingham University
- Genre: Gothic rock; post-punk
- Length: 3:51
- Label: Factory
- Songwriters: Bernard Sumner; Peter Hook; Stephen Morris; Ian Curtis
- Producer: Martin Hannett

"Ceremony" is a song written by Joy Division, and first released as New Order's debut single in 1981. The track and its B-side, "In a Lonely Place", were recorded as Joy Division before the death of their lead singer Ian Curtis. Both were re-recorded and carried over to Joy Division's re-formation as New Order.

New Order released the song as a single twice, firstly in March 1981 and secondly in October 1981 featuring new member Gillian Gilbert; the latter recording appeared on the 1987 compilation album Substance.

== History ==
=== Joy Division ===
"Ceremony" was one of the last Joy Division songs to be composed, with lyrics written by Ian Curtis. According to guitarist Bernard Sumner, the group wrote the song a few weeks before Curtis' death "to try and heal him through music" and keep him "involved in the band and involved in music and remind him of what ... a great future he had". Sumner concluded, "Unfortunately, it didn't work".

At the time, the group felt that the song represented a major step forward and had the potential to be a major hit. Sumner characterised the song as "a very uplifting track, filled with and enhanced by Ian's lyrics". Drummer Stephen Morris commented, "In my opinion, it had 'hit single' pressed through it like Blackpool rock. It was probably the only Joy Division song that I played repeatedly on cassette. I liked it that much. It was something uplifting and well...up [in mood]. It felt like the start of something new – or different, at least".

There are three recorded versions by Joy Division in existence. The first is a live version, available on the Still album, from their final concert at High Hall, University of Birmingham, on 2 May 1980. The second, available on the Heart and Soul four-disc box set, is from a studio session on 14 May 1980, four days before Curtis' suicide. It was the group's last recording. The third is a version recorded at the soundcheck on the afternoon of 2 May 1980 (along with "Decades") and is only available via bootleg. In all recordings, the vocals are only partially audible.

=== New Order ===
After the death of Ian Curtis, the remaining members of Joy Division regrouped as New Order. Their first release was a re-recording of "Ceremony" as a stand-alone single backed with "In a Lonely Place", with Sumner taking over lead vocals. Because Curtis had never transcribed the lyrics to "Ceremony" and his singing was muted to the point of near-inaudibility on all surviving recordings, Sumner attempted to isolate Curtis' vocals from the recordings with a graphic equalizer to approximate the lyrics.

==== New Order "Version 1" March 1981 ====
On 6 March 1981, the first single of New Order and the first version of the song "Ceremony" was released by Factory Records (catalogue number FAC 33). Initially released as a 7" single, it was reissued as a 12" two months later. Joy Division producer Martin Hannett produced the record and Peter Saville designed the sleeve artwork for both releases.

The 7" record was issued in a stamped gold-bronze sleeve. The 12" sleeve was a completely separate design: gold typography on a green background, although a hybrid green on copper design existed in 12" on an earlier Italian pressing.

==== New Order "Version 2" September 1981 ====
In September 1981, "Ceremony" was re-released. New member Gillian Gilbert played guitar on this new recording just after she joined the band. Martin Hannett again produced the record. The single was re-issued as a 12" only, with the same catalogue number as the prior issue. The original is approximately 4:34 minutes in length while the re-recording is 4:23. The re-recorded version was used on all subsequent compilations until Singles in 2005, when the original March '81 recording was released on CD for the first time. The B-side of the reissued single featured an alternate mix of "In a Lonely Place", substantially similar but identifiable by different placement of its "digital thunderclaps".

=== Re-issues ===
The single was re-issued again in April 2011 for Record Store Day in a white sleeve. This limited edition release (only 800 copies) plays at 33 rpm. It features the New Order recordings of "Ceremony" (the pre-Gillian Gilbert take) and the alternate mix of "In a Lonely Place" on one side, with the rare Joy Division recordings of the same tracks on the flip side.

In 2019, the single was re-issued in two editions: a "green sleeve" edition with contents identical to the original issue, and a "white and blue" sleeve edition with the September 1981 version of "Ceremony" (with Gillian Gilbert) on the A-side, but the original mix of "In a Lonely Place" on the B-side (unlike the September 1981 reissue with a similar cover, which featured the alternate mix).

== Track listing ==
All tracks are written by Ian Curtis, Peter Hook, Stephen Morris and Bernard Sumner.

7-inch: FAC 33 (UK)
No.	Title	Length
1.	"Ceremony" (March 1981 version)	4:34
2.	"In a Lonely Place" (original mix, edit)	4:35

12-inch: FAC 33 (UK)
No.	Title	Length
1.	"Ceremony" (March 1981 version)	4:34
2.	"In a Lonely Place" (original mix)	6:12

- Usually a green sleeve.

12-inch: FAC 33 (UK) – Second pressing
No.	Title	Length
1.	"Ceremony" (Sept. 1981 version)	4:22
2.	"In a Lonely Place" (alternate mix)	6:12

- Usually a cream and blue sleeve.

12-inch: FAC 33 (UK) – 2011 Record Store Day pressing
No.	Title	Length
1.	"Ceremony" (March 1981 version)	4:34
2.	"In a Lonely Place" (alternate mix)	6:12
3.	"Ceremony" (Joy Division version (from the 1997 Heart and Soul box set))	4:14
4.	"In a Lonely Place" (Joy Division version (previously unreleased))	5:30

- White sleeve

12-inch: FAC 33 (Europe) – 2019 pressing (green sleeve)
No.	Title	Length
1.	"Ceremony" (March 1981 version)	4:34
2.	"In a Lonely Place" (original mix)	6:12

12-inch: FAC 33 (Europe) – 2019 pressing (white and blue sleeve)
No.	Title	Length
1.	"Ceremony" (Sept. 1981 version)	4:22
2.	"In a Lonely Place" (original mix)	6:12

== Charts ==
Chart (1981)	Peak position
New Zealand RIANZ Singles Chart^{1}	7
UK Singles Chart	34
UK Independent Singles Chart	1
US Billboard Hot Dance Club Play	61

Notes:

- ^{1} – charted in 1983 and 1984.
