= Still (Joy Division album) =

Compilation album by Joy Division
- Released: 9 October 1981
- Recorded: October 1978 – May 1980
- Genre: Post-punk
- Length: 83:25
- Label: Factory – FACT40
- Producer: Martin Hannett

Joy Division compilations chronology
Still (1981)	Substance (1988)

Joy Division chronology
Closer (1980)	Still (1981)	The Peel Sessions (1986)

Still is a compilation album by English rock band Joy Division, consisting of previously released and unreleased studio material and a live recording of Joy Division's last concert, performed at Birmingham University. It was released on 9 October 1981 by Factory Records.

== Background ==
Still was released after the death of the band's frontman Ian Curtis. It consists of previously unused or unavailable studio material and live recordings. The album includes the only live performance by the group of the song "Ceremony", which later became a New Order single. The recording abruptly begins just before the song's first chorus. Like all surviving Joy Division recordings of "Ceremony", Curtis's vocals are barely audible; in this instance, however, the final chorus is unusually clear. Another song featured is a cover version of the Velvet Underground's "Sister Ray", recorded at the Moonlight Club in London on 2 April 1980.

== Release ==
Originally planned for release in August, Still was eventually released in October 1981. It reached No. 5 in the UK upon its release, and peaked at No. 3 in New Zealand in February 1982.

The CD version of the album was released in March 1990; it was the first edition to delete "Twenty Four Hours".

Still, along with Closer and Unknown Pleasures, was remastered and reissued on 17 September 2007. The remaster was packaged with a bonus disc of live recordings from the Town Hall, High Wycombe on 20 February 1980.

== Reception ==
Professional ratings
Review scores
Source	Rating
AllMusic	3/5 stars
BBC Music	(mixed)
Encyclopedia of Popular Music	3/5 stars
Pitchfork	8.4/10
Q	2/5 stars
Uncut	4/5 stars

Joshua Klein of Pitchfork called the album "a ragged, enigmatic coda; an uneven odds-and-ends collection of lost tracks that fills in some gaps in Joy Division's history and legacy". In 2013, BBC Music called it "a partly frustrating compilation...aimed at quickly curtailing the bootleg industry that always follows the death of a young icon".

== Track listing ==
All tracks are written by Joy Division (Ian Curtis, Peter Hook, Stephen Morris and Bernard Sumner), except "Sister Ray", written by John Cale, Sterling Morrison, Lou Reed and Maureen Tucker.

Side A
No.	Title	Length
1.	"Exercise One" (recorded in April 1979 at Strawberry Studios, Stockport during sessions for Unknown Pleasures)	3:06
2.	"Ice Age" (recorded in October–November 1979 at Cargo Studios, Rochdale during sessions for the "Licht und Blindheit" single)	2:24
3.	"The Sound of Music" (recorded in January 1980 at Pennine Sound Studios, Oldham during sessions for the "Love Will Tear Us Apart" single)	3:55
4.	"Glass" (recorded in October 1978 at Cargo Studios, Rochdale; originally released on A Factory Sample)	3:56
5.	"The Only Mistake" (recorded in April 1979 at Strawberry Studios, Stockport during sessions for Unknown Pleasures)	4:17

Side B
No.	Title	Length
6.	"Walked in Line" (recorded in April 1979 at Strawberry Studios, Stockport during sessions for Unknown Pleasures)	2:47
7.	"The Kill" (recorded in April 1979 at Strawberry Studios, Stockport during sessions for Unknown Pleasures)	2:15
8.	"Something Must Break" (recorded in July 1979 at Strawberry Studios, Stockport during sessions for the "Transmission" single)	2:48
9.	"Dead Souls" (recorded in October–November 1979 at Cargo Studios, Rochdale. Originally released as the b-side of the "Licht und Blindheit" single)	4:53
10.	"Sister Ray" (The Velvet Underground cover; recorded live at the Moonlight Club, London on 2 April 1980)	7:36

Side C
No.	Title	Length
11.	"Ceremony" (recorded live at High Hall, Birmingham University on 2 May 1980)	3:50
12.	"Shadowplay" (recorded live at High Hall, Birmingham University on 2 May 1980)	3:57
13.	"Means to an End" (recorded live at High Hall, Birmingham University on 2 May 1980)	4:01
14.	"Passover" (recorded live at High Hall, Birmingham University on 2 May 1980)	5:10
15.	"New Dawn Fades" (recorded live at High Hall, Birmingham University on 2 May 1980)	4:01
16.	"Twenty Four Hours" (recorded live at High Hall, Birmingham University on 2 May 1980; extra track on original vinyl and cassette versions only)	4:26

Side D
No.	Title	Length
17.	"Transmission" (recorded live at High Hall, Birmingham University on 2 May 1980)	3:40
18.	"Disorder" (recorded live at High Hall, Birmingham University on 2 May 1980)	3:24
19.	"Isolation" (recorded live at High Hall, Birmingham University on 2 May 1980)	3:05
20.	"Decades" (recorded live at High Hall, Birmingham University on 2 May 1980)	5:47
21.	"Digital" (recorded live at High Hall, Birmingham University on 2 May 1980)	3:52

2007 CD remaster bonus disc (live at High Wycombe Town Hall, 20 February 1980)
No.	Title	Length
1.	"The Sound of Music" (recorded live at High Wycombe Town Hall on 20 February 1980)	4:19
2.	"A Means to an End" (recorded live at High Wycombe Town Hall on 20 February 1980)	3:57
3.	"Colony" (recorded live at High Wycombe Town Hall on 20 February 1980)	4:06
4.	"Twenty Four Hours" (recorded live at High Wycombe Town Hall on 20 February 1980)	4:20
5.	"Isolation" (recorded live at High Wycombe Town Hall on 20 February 1980)	2:49
6.	"Love Will Tear Us Apart" (recorded live at High Wycombe Town Hall on 20 February 1980)	3:14
7.	"Disorder" (recorded live at High Wycombe Town Hall on 20 February 1980)	3:13
8.	"Atrocity Exhibition" (recorded live at High Wycombe Town Hall on 20 February 1980)	5:58
9.	"Isolation" (soundcheck: recorded live at High Wycombe Town Hall on 20 February 1980)	3:00
10.	"The Eternal" (soundcheck: recorded live at High Wycombe Town Hall on 20 February 1980)	3:36
11.	"Ice Age" (soundcheck: recorded live at High Wycombe Town Hall on 20 February 1980)	3:16
12.	"Disorder" (soundcheck: recorded live at High Wycombe Town Hall on 20 February 1980)	3:14
13.	"The Sound of Music" (soundcheck: recorded live at High Wycombe Town Hall on 20 February 1980)	4:05
14.	"A Means to an End" (soundcheck: recorded live at High Wycombe Town Hall on 20 February 1980)	3:45
Total length:		53:12

== Personnel ==
Technical

- Martin Hannett – production
- Chris Nagle – engineering
- Grafica Industria – sleeve artwork

== Charts ==
Chart performance for Still
Chart (2022)	Peak position
German Albums (Offizielle Top 100)	56

== Certifications ==
Certifications for Still 2007 reissue
Region	Certification	Certified units/sales
United Kingdom (BPI)	Gold	100,000^{‡}
^{‡} Sales+streaming figures based on certification alone.
