= Joy Division =

English rock band (1976–1980)

- Joy Division, c. 1979. Left to right: Stephen Morris, Ian Curtis, Bernard Sumner, Peter Hook

Background information
- Also known as: Stiff Kittens (1977); Warsaw (1977–1978)
- Origin: Salford, England
- Genres: Post-punk; gothic rock; new wave
- Works: Joy Division discography
- Years active: 1976–1980
- Labels: Factory; Enigma; Virgin; Anonymous; Fast Product; Sordide Sentimental
- Spinoffs: New Order
- Past members: Ian Curtis; Bernard Sumner; Peter Hook; Stephen Morris; (see Band members section for others)
- Website: joydivisionofficial.com
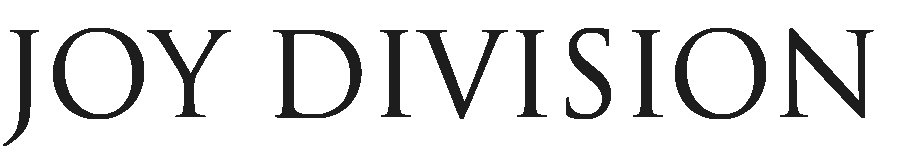

Joy Division were an English rock band formed in Salford in 1976. The group consisted of vocalist, guitarist and lyricist Ian Curtis, guitarist and keyboardist Bernard Sumner, bassist Peter Hook, and drummer Stephen Morris.

Sumner and Hook formed the band after attending a June 1976 Sex Pistols concert. Their self-released 1978 debut EP An Ideal for Living drew the attention of the Manchester television personality Tony Wilson, who signed them to his independent label Factory Records. While Joy Division's early recordings were heavily influenced by punk rock, they soon developed a sparse yet atmospheric sound and style that made them one of the pioneering groups of the post-punk genre. Their debut album Unknown Pleasures, recorded with producer Martin Hannett, was released in 1979.

Curtis struggled with personal problems, including a failing marriage, depression, and epilepsy. As the band's popularity grew, Curtis's health condition made it increasingly difficult for him to perform; he occasionally experienced seizures on stage. He died by suicide on the eve of what would have been the band's first North American tour in May 1980, aged 23. Joy Division's second and final album, Closer, was released two months later; it and the single "Love Will Tear Us Apart" became their highest-charting releases.

Between July and October 1980, the remaining members, with the addition of keyboardist and guitarist Gillian Gilbert, regrouped under the name New Order. They were successful throughout the next decade, blending post-punk with electronic and dance music influences. Joy Division would remain a prominent influence on subsequent generations of alternative acts, particularly within the gothic rock genre. In 2026, both Joy Division and New Order were inducted as one act into the Rock and Roll Hall of Fame.

== History ==
=== Formation ===
On 4 June 1976, childhood friends Bernard Sumner and Peter Hook separately attended a Sex Pistols show at the Manchester Lesser Free Trade Hall. Afterwards, both felt inspired by the Pistols' performance. Sumner said that he felt the Pistols had "destroyed the myth of being a pop star, of a musician being some kind of god that you had to worship". The following day Hook borrowed £35 from his mother to buy a bass guitar. They formed a band with Terry Mason, who had also attended the gig; Sumner bought a guitar, and Mason a drum kit. After their schoolfriend Martin Gresty declined an invitation to join as vocalist after getting a job at a factory, the band placed an advertisement for a vocalist in the Manchester Virgin Records shop. Ian Curtis, who knew them from earlier gigs, responded and was hired without audition. Sumner said that he "knew he was all right to get on with and that's what we based the whole group on. If we liked someone, they were in."

Buzzcocks manager Richard Boon and frontman Pete Shelley have both been credited with suggesting the band name "Stiff Kittens", but the band settled on "Warsaw" shortly before their first gig, a reference to David Bowie's song "Warszawa". Warsaw debuted on 29 May 1977 at the Electric Circus, supporting the Buzzcocks, Penetration and John Cooper Clarke. Tony Tabac played drums that night after joining the band two days earlier. Reviews in the NME by Paul Morley and in Sounds by Ian Wood brought them immediate national exposure. Mason became the band's manager and Tabac was replaced on drums in June 1977 by Steve Brotherdale, who also played in the punk band the Panik. Brotherdale tried to get Curtis to leave the band and join the Panik, and even had Curtis audition. On 18 July 1977, Warsaw recorded five demo tracks at Pennine Sound Studios, Oldham. Uneasy with Brotherdale's aggressive personality, the band fired him soon after the sessions. Driving home from the studio, they pulled over and asked Brotherdale to check on a flat tyre; when he got out of the car, they drove off.

In August 1977, Warsaw placed an advertisement in a music shop window seeking a replacement drummer. Stephen Morris, who had attended the same school as Curtis, was the sole respondent. Deborah Curtis, Ian's wife, stated that Morris "fitted perfectly" with the band, and that with his addition Warsaw became a "complete 'family'". To avoid confusion with the London punk band Warsaw Pakt, the band renamed themselves Joy Division in early 1978, borrowing the name from the sexual slavery wing of a Nazi concentration camp mentioned in the 1953 novel House of Dolls. On 14 December, the group recorded their debut EP, An Ideal for Living, at Pennine Sound Studio and played their final gig as Warsaw on New Year's Eve at the Swinging Apple in Liverpool. Billed as Warsaw to ensure an audience, the band played their first gig as Joy Division on 25 January 1978 at Pip's Disco in Manchester.

=== Early releases ===
Joy Division were approached by RCA Records to record a cover of Nolan "N.F." Porter's "Keep on Keepin' On" at a Manchester recording studio. The band spent late March and April 1978 writing and rehearsing material. During the Stiff/Chiswick Challenge concert at Manchester's Rafters club on 14 April, they caught the attention of TV music presenter Tony Wilson and manager Rob Gretton. Curtis berated Wilson for not putting the group on his Granada Television show So It Goes; Wilson responded that Joy Division would be the next band he would showcase on TV. Gretton, the venue's resident DJ, was so impressed by the band's performance that he convinced them to take him on as their manager. Gretton, whose "dogged determination" was later credited for much of the band's public success, contributed the business skills to provide Joy Division with a better foundation for creativity. Joy Division spent the first week of May 1978 recording at Manchester's Arrow Studios. The band were unhappy with the Grapevine Records head John Anderson's insistence on adding synthesiser into the mix to soften the sound, and asked to be dropped from the contract with RCA.

Joy Division made their recorded debut in June 1978 when the band self-released An Ideal for Living, and two weeks later their track "At a Later Date" was featured on the compilation album Short Circuit: Live at the Electric Circus (which had been recorded live in October 1977). In the Melody Maker review, Chris Brazier said that it "has the familiar rough-hewn nature of home-produced records, but they're no mere drone-vendors—there are a lot of good ideas here, and they could be a very interesting band by now, seven months on". The packaging of An Ideal for Living—which featured a drawing of a Hitler Youth member on the cover—coupled with the nature of the band's name fuelled speculation about their political affiliations. While Hook and Sumner later said they were intrigued by fascism at the time, Morris believed that the group's dalliance with Nazi imagery came from a desire to keep memories of the sacrifices of their parents and grandparents during World War II alive. He argued that accusations of neo-Nazi sympathies merely provoked the band "to keep on doing it, because that's the kind of people we are".

On 20 September 1978, Joy Division made their television debut performing "Shadowplay" on So It Goes, with an introduction by Wilson. In October, Joy Division contributed two tracks recorded with producer Martin Hannett to the compilation double-7" EP A Factory Sample, the first release by Tony Wilson's record label, Factory Records. In the NME review of the EP, Paul Morley praised the band as "the missing link" between Elvis Presley and Siouxsie and the Banshees. Joy Division joined Factory's roster, after buying themselves out of the RCA deal. Gretton was made a label partner to represent the interests of the band. On 27 December, during the drive home from a gig at the Hope and Anchor in London, Curtis had his first recognised severe epileptic seizure and was hospitalised. Meanwhile, Joy Division's career progressed, and Curtis appeared on the 13 January 1979 cover of NME. That month the band recorded their session for BBC Radio 1 DJ John Peel. According to Deborah Curtis, "Sandwiched in between these two important landmarks was the realisation that Ian's illness was something we would have to learn to accommodate".

=== Unknown Pleasures and breakthrough ===
Joy Division's debut album, Unknown Pleasures, was recorded at Strawberry Studios, Stockport, in April 1979. Producer Martin Hannett significantly altered their live sound, a fact that greatly displeased the band at the time; however, in 2006, Hook said that in retrospect Hannett had done a good job and "created the Joy Division sound". The album cover was designed by Peter Saville, who went on to provide artwork for future Joy Division and New Order releases. Unknown Pleasures was released in June and sold through its initial pressing of 10,000 copies. Wilson said the success turned the indie label into a true business and a "revolutionary force" that operated outside of the major record label system. Reviewing the album for Melody Maker, writer Jon Savage described the album as an "opaque manifesto" and declared it "one of the best, white, English, debut LPs of the year".

Joy Division performed on Granada TV again on 20 July 1979, and made their only nationwide TV appearance on 15 September on BBC2's Something Else. They supported the Buzzcocks in a 24-venue UK tour that began that October, which allowed the band to quit their regular jobs. The non-album single "Transmission" was released in November. Joy Division's burgeoning success drew a devoted following who were stereotyped as "intense young men dressed in grey overcoats".

=== Closer and Curtis's health problems ===
Joy Division toured Europe in January 1980. Although the schedule was demanding, Curtis experienced only two grand mal seizures, both in the final two months of the tour. That March, the band recorded their second album, Closer, with Hannett at London's Britannia Row Studios. That month they released the "Licht und Blindheit" single, with "Atmosphere" as the A-side and "Dead Souls" as the B-side, on the French independent label Sordide Sentimental.

A lack of sleep and long hours destabilised Curtis's epilepsy, and his seizures became almost uncontrollable. He often had seizures during performances, which some audience members believed were part of the performance. The seizures left him feeling ashamed and depressed, and the band became increasingly worried about Curtis's condition. On 7 April 1980, Curtis attempted suicide by overdosing on his anti-seizure medication, phenobarbitone. The following evening, Joy Division were scheduled to play a gig at the Derby Hall in Bury. Curtis was too ill to perform, so at Gretton's insistence the band played a combined set with Alan Hempsall of Crispy Ambulance and Simon Topping of A Certain Ratio singing on the first few songs. When Topping came back towards the end of the set, some audience members threw bottles at the stage. Curtis's ill health led to the cancellation of several other gigs that April. Joy Division's final live performance was held at the University of Birmingham's High Hall on 2 May and included their only performance of "Ceremony", one of the last songs written by Curtis.

Basically, we want to play and enjoy what we like playing. I think that when we stop doing that, I think, well, that will be time to pack it in. That will be the end.

— Ian Curtis, Radio Lancashire interview, 1979.

Hannett's production has been widely praised. However, as with Unknown Pleasures, both Hook and Sumner were unhappy with the production. Hook said that when he heard the final mix of "Atrocity Exhibition" he was disappointed that the abrasiveness had been toned down. He wrote: "I was like, head in hands, 'Oh fucking hell, it's happening again ... Martin had fucking melted the guitar with his Marshall Time Waster. Made it sound like someone strangling a cat and, to my mind, absolutely killed the song. I was so annoyed with him and went in and gave him a piece of my mind but he just turned round and told me to fuck off."

=== Curtis's suicide and aftermath ===
Joy Division were scheduled to commence their first US/Canada tour in May 1980. Curtis had expressed enthusiasm about the tour, but his relationship with his wife, Deborah, was under strain; Deborah was excluded from the band's inner circle and objected to Curtis being close to Belgian journalist and music promoter Annik Honoré, whom he met on tour in Europe in 1979. He was also anxious about how American audiences would react to his epilepsy.

The evening before the band were due to depart for America, Curtis returned to his Macclesfield home to talk to Deborah. He asked her to drop an impending divorce suit, and asked her to leave him alone in the house until he caught a train to Manchester the following morning. Early on 18 May 1980, having spent the night watching the Werner Herzog film Stroszek and listening to Iggy Pop's 1977 album The Idiot, Curtis hanged himself in his kitchen. Deborah discovered his body later that day when she returned.

The suicide shocked the band and their management. In 2005, Wilson said: "I think all of us made the mistake of not thinking his suicide was going to happen ... We all completely underestimated the danger. We didn't take it seriously. That's how stupid we were." Music critic Simon Reynolds said Curtis's suicide "made for instant myth". Jon Savage's obituary said that "now no one will remember what his work with Joy Division was like when he was alive; it will be perceived as tragic rather than courageous". In June 1980, Joy Division's single "Love Will Tear Us Apart" was released, which hit number thirteen on the UK Singles Chart. In July 1980, Closer was released, and peaked at number six on the UK Albums Chart. NME reviewer Charles Shaar Murray wrote, "Closer is as magnificent a memorial (for 'Joy Division' as much as for Ian Curtis) as any post-Presley popular musician could have."

Morris said that even without Curtis's death, it is unlikely that Joy Division would have endured. The members had made a pact long before Curtis's death that, should any member leave, the remaining members would change the band name. The band re-formed as New Order, with Sumner on vocals; they later recruited Morris's girlfriend Gillian Gilbert as keyboardist and second guitarist. Gilbert had befriended the band and played guitar at a Joy Division performance when Curtis had been unable to play.

New Order's debut single, "Ceremony" (1981), was formed from the last two songs written with Curtis. New Order struggled in their early years to escape the shadow of Joy Division, but went on to achieve far greater commercial success with a different, more upbeat and dance-oriented sound.

Various Joy Division outtakes and live material have been released. Still, featuring live tracks and rare recordings, was issued in 1981. Factory issued the Substance compilation in 1988, including several out-of-print singles. Permanent was released in 1995 by London Records, which had acquired the Joy Division catalogue after Factory's 1992 bankruptcy. The comprehensive box set Heart and Soul was released in 1997.

== Musical style ==
=== Sound ===
Disorder
A sample of the song Disorder from their album Unknown Pleasures

Joy Division took time to develop their style and quickly evolved from their punk roots. Their sound during their early inception as Warsaw was described as fairly generic and "undistinguished punk-inflected hard-rock". Critic Simon Reynolds observed how the band's originality only "really became apparent as the songs got slower", and their music took on a "sparse" quality. According to Reynolds, "Hook's bass carried the melody, Bernard Sumner's guitar left gaps rather than filling up the group's sound with dense riffage and Steve Morris's drums seemed to circle the rim of a crater." According to music critic Jon Savage, "Joy Division were not punk but they were directly inspired by its energy". In 1994 Sumner said the band's characteristic sound "came out naturally: I'm more rhythm and chords, and Hooky was melody. He used to play high lead bass because I liked my guitar to sound distorted, and the amplifier I had would only work when it was at full volume. When Hooky played low, he couldn't hear himself. Steve has his own style which is different to other drummers. To me, a drummer in the band is the clock, but Steve wouldn't be the clock, because he's passive: he would follow the rhythm of the band, which gave us our own edge." By Closer, Curtis had adopted a low baritone voice, drawing comparisons to Jim Morrison of the Doors (one of Curtis's favourite bands).

Sumner largely acted as the band's director, a role he continued in New Order. While Sumner was the group's primary guitarist, Curtis played the instrument on a few recorded songs and during a few shows. Curtis hated playing guitar, but the band insisted he do so. Sumner said, "He played in quite a bizarre way and that to us was interesting, because no one else would play like Ian". During the recording sessions for Closer, Sumner began using self-built synthesisers and Hook used a six-string bass for more melody.

Producer Martin Hannett "dedicated himself to capturing and intensifying Joy Division's eerie spatiality". Hannett believed punk rock was sonically conservative because of its refusal to use studio technology to create sonic space. The producer instead aimed to create a more expansive sound on the group's records. Hannett said, "[Joy Division] were a gift to a producer, because they didn't have a clue. They didn't argue". Hannett demanded clean and clear "sound separation" not only for individual instruments, but even for individual pieces of Morris's drumkit. Morris recalled, "Typically on tracks he considered to be potential singles, he'd get me to play each drum on its own to avoid any bleed-through of sound". Music journalist Richard Cook noted that Hannett's role was "crucial". There are "devices of distance" in his production and "the sound is an illusion of physicality".

=== Lyrics ===
Curtis was the band's sole lyricist. He typically composed his lyrics in a notebook, independently of the eventual music to evolve. The music itself was largely written by Sumner and Hook as the group jammed during rehearsals. Curtis's imagery and word choice often referenced "coldness, pressure, darkness, crisis, failure, collapse, loss of control". In 1979, NME journalist Paul Rambali wrote, "The themes of Joy Division's music are sorrowful, painful and sometimes deeply sad." Music journalist Jon Savage wrote that "Curtis's great lyrical achievement was to capture the underlying reality of a society in turmoil, and to make it both universal and personal," while noting that "the lyrics reflected, in mood and approach, his interest in romantic and science-fiction literature." Critic Robert Palmer wrote that William S. Burroughs and J. G. Ballard were "obvious influences" to Curtis, and Morris also remembered the singer reading T. S. Eliot. Deborah Curtis also remembered Curtis reading works by writers such as Fyodor Dostoevsky, Friedrich Nietzsche, Jean-Paul Sartre, Franz Kafka, and Hermann Hesse.

Curtis was unwilling to explain the meaning behind his lyrics and Joy Division releases were absent of any lyric sheets. He told the fanzine Printed Noise, "We haven't got a message really; the lyrics are open to interpretation. They're multidimensional. You can read into them what you like." The other Joy Division members have said that at the time, they paid little attention to the contents of Curtis's lyrics. In a 1987 interview with Option, Morris said that they "just thought the songs were sort of sympathetic and more uplifting than depressing. But everyone's got their own opinion." Deborah Curtis recalled that only with the release of Closer did many who were close to the singer realise "[h]is intentions and feelings were all there within the lyrics". The surviving members regret not seeing the warning signs in Curtis's lyrics. Morris said that "it was only after Ian died that we sat down and listened to the lyrics ... you'd find yourself thinking, 'Oh my God, I missed this one'. Because I'd look at Ian's lyrics and think how clever he was putting himself in the position of someone else. I never believed he was writing about himself. Looking back, how could I have been so bleedin' stupid? Of course he was writing about himself. But I didn't go in and grab him and ask, 'What's up?' I have to live with that".

=== Live performances ===
I saw three attacks, and it was always two-thirds of the way through a set ... it came to a point where in the last year, you'd watch the group and suddenly you'd feel Ian may be dancing great and suddenly really great. Hooky and Barney would be looking nervously at the stage and you could see what was going through their minds ... for something was happening within a set, doing what he did, that actually took him to that point, that actually overcame the drugs and made him have the attack.

— Tony Wilson, reflecting upon Ian Curtis's seizures while performing live with Joy Division.

In contrast to the relatively polished sound of their studio recordings, Joy Division typically played loudly and aggressively during live performances. The band were especially unhappy with Hannett's mix of Unknown Pleasures, which reduced the abrasiveness of their live sound for a more cerebral and ghostly sound. According to Sumner "the music was loud and heavy, and we felt that Martin had toned it down, especially with the guitars".

The group did not typically interact with the audience during concerts. According to Paul Morley, "During a Joy Division set, outside of the songs, you'll be lucky to hear more than two or three words. Hello and goodbye. No introductions, no promotion." Curtis would often perform what became known as his "'dead fly' dance", as if imitating a seizure; his arms would "start flying in [a] semicircular, hypnotic curve". Simon Reynolds noted that Curtis's dancing style was reminiscent of an epileptic seizure, and that he was dancing in the manner for some months before he was diagnosed with epilepsy.

Curtis' diagnosis made live performances difficult for the band. Sumner later reflected in 2007, "We didn't have flashing lights, but sometimes a particular drum beat would do something to him. He'd go off in a trance for a bit, then he'd lose it and have an epileptic fit. We'd have to stop the show and carry him off to the dressing room where he'd cry his eyes out because this appalling thing had just happened to him."

=== Influences ===
Sumner wrote that Curtis was inspired by artists such as the Doors, Iggy Pop, David Bowie, Kraftwerk, the Velvet Underground and Neu!. Hook has also related that Curtis was particularly influenced by Iggy Pop's chaotic stage persona. The group were inspired by Kraftwerk's "marriage between humans and machines", and the inventiveness of their electronic music. Joy Division played Trans-Europe Express through the PA before they went on stage, "to get a momentum". Bowie's "Berlin Trilogy" elaborated with Brian Eno, influenced them; the "cold austerity" of the synthesisers on the B-sides of "Heroes" and Low albums, was a "music looking at the future". Morris cited the "unique style" of Velvet Underground's Maureen Tucker and the motorik drum beats, from Neu! and Can. Morris also credited Siouxsie and the Banshees because their "first drummer Kenny Morris played mostly toms" and "the sound of cymbals was forbidden". Hook said that "Siouxsie and the Banshees were one of our big influences ... The way the guitarist and the drummer played was a really unusual way of playing". Hook drew inspiration from the style of bassist Jean-Jacques Burnel and his early material with the Stranglers; he also credited Carol Kaye and her musical basslines on early 1970s work of the Temptations. Sumner mentioned "the raw, nasty, unpolished edge" in the guitars of the Rolling Stones, the simple riff of "Vicious" on Lou Reed's Transformer, and Neil Young. His musical horizon went up a notch with Jimi Hendrix, he realised "it wasn't about little catchy tunes ... it was what you could do sonically with a guitar."

== Legacy ==
Despite their short career, Joy Division have exerted a wide-reaching influence and achieved widespread critical acclaim. John Bush of AllMusic argues that Joy Division "became the first band in the post-punk movement by ... emphasizing not anger and energy but mood and expression, pointing ahead to the rise of melancholy alternative music in the '80s." Distinguished as "Joy Division/New Order", the group has been nominated three times for the Rock and Roll Hall of Fame (2023, 2025, and 2026), and was inducted in 2026.

The band's dark and gloomy sound, which Martin Hannett described in 1979 as "dancing music with Gothic overtones", presaged in part the gothic rock genre. While the term "gothic" originally described a "doomy atmosphere" in music of the late 1970s, the term was soon applied to specific bands like Bauhaus that followed in the wake of Joy Division and Siouxsie and the Banshees. Standard musical fixtures of early gothic rock bands included "high-pitched post-Joy Division basslines usurp[ing] the melodic role" and "vocals that were either near operatic and Teutonic or deep, droning alloys of Jim Morrison and Ian Curtis."

Joy Division have been dramatised in two biopics. 24 Hour Party People (2002) is a fictionalised account of Factory Records in which members of the band appear as supporting characters — Ian Curtis portrayed by Sean Harris, Bernard Sumner by John Simm, and Peter Hook by Ralf Little. Tony Wilson said of the film, "It's all true, it's all not true. It's not a fucking documentary", and that he favoured the "myth" over the truth. The 2007 film Control, directed by Anton Corbijn, is a biography of Ian Curtis (portrayed by Sam Riley) that uses Deborah Curtis's biography of her late husband, Touching from a Distance (1995), as its basis. Control had its international premiere on the opening night of Director's Fortnight at the 2007 Cannes Film Festival, where it was critically well received. That year Grant Gee directed the band documentary Joy Division.

Joy Division have influenced many bands, including their contemporaries U2, the Cure and Orchestral Manoeuvres in the Dark. Others include Tears for Fears, Soundgarden, the Proclaimers, Mogwai, Hüsker Dü, Future Islands, and Girls Against Boys. Rapper Danny Brown named his album Atrocity Exhibition after the Joy Division song, whose title was partially inspired by the 1970 J. G. Ballard collection of condensed novels of the same name. In 2005 both New Order and Joy Division were inducted into the UK Music Hall of Fame.

== Band members ==
Principal lineup

- Bernard Sumner – guitar, keyboards, synthesiser (1976–1980); bass (1979–1980)
- Peter Hook – bass, backing and occasional lead vocals (1976–1980); guitar (1979–1980)
- Ian Curtis – lead vocals, melodica (1976–1980; his death); guitar (1979–1980)
- Stephen Morris – drums, percussion (1977–1980)

Early members

- Terry Mason – drums (1976–1977)
- Tony Tabac – drums (1977)
- Steve Brotherdale – drums (1977)

Guest musician

- Gillian Gilbert – guitar (1979–1980)

== Discography ==
- Unknown Pleasures (1979)
- Closer (1980)
