= Unknown Pleasures =

Studio album by Joy Division
- Released: 15 June 1979
- Recorded: 1–17 April 1979
- Studios: Strawberry (Stockport, UK)
- Genres: Post-punk; gothic rock; new wave; punk rock
- Length: 39:24
- Label: Factory
- Producer: Martin Hannett

Joy Division chronology
An Ideal for Living (1978)	Unknown Pleasures (1979)	Closer (1980)

Unknown Pleasures is the debut studio album by the English rock band Joy Division. It was released in June 1979 through Factory Records. The album was recorded and mixed over three successive weekends at Stockport's Strawberry Studios in April 1979, with producer Martin Hannett contributing a number of unconventional recording techniques to the group's sound. The cover artwork was designed by artist Peter Saville, using a data plot of signals from a radio pulsar. It is the only Joy Division album released during lead singer Ian Curtis's lifetime.

Factory Records did not release any singles from Unknown Pleasures. In January 1980 the album placed at No. 2 on the first publication of the Indie Albums Chart. It reached No. 71 on the Albums Chart when reissued in July 1980 just after the release of the subsequent album Closer, eventually reaching No. 5 in 2019 upon a later reissue. It has since received sustained critical acclaim as an influential post-punk album, and has been named as one of the best albums of all time by publications such as NME, AllMusic, Select, Rolling Stone, and Spin.

== Background ==
Joy Division formed in Salford in 1976 during the first wave of punk rock. Bernard Sumner and Peter Hook had separately attended a Sex Pistols show at the Manchester Lesser Free Trade Hall on 4 June 1976 and both embraced that band's simplicity, speed and aggression. On 20 July 1976, Ian Curtis attended the band's second performance at the Lesser Free Trade Hall. Forming a band with their friend Terry Mason on drums, Sumner on guitar and Hook on bass, they advertised for a singer. Curtis, whom Sumner and Hook already knew, applied and, without having to audition, was taken on. After a number of changes of drummer, Stephen Morris joined the band—at that time called Warsaw—in August 1977. To avoid confusion with the London punk band Warsaw Pakt, they renamed themselves Joy Division in late 1977.

After signing a recording contract with RCA Records in early 1978, Joy Division recorded some demos; however, they were unhappy with the way their music was mixed and asked to be released from their contract. The band's first release was the self-produced extended play (EP), An Ideal for Living, which was released in June 1978. They made their television debut on Tony Wilson's local news show Granada Reports in September 1978. According to Hook, the band received a £70,000 offer from Genetic Records in London. However, the band's manager, Rob Gretton, approached Wilson about releasing an album on his Factory Records label. Wilson explained that Gretton had calculated that given Factory's 50/50 split of profits, the band could make as much money with the indie label as it could by signing to a major. Wilson added that one of Gretton's main reasons for approaching Factory was so "he wouldn't have to get on a train to London every week and 'talk to nuggets'. No one could use the word 'cockney' with as much contempt as Rob". Gretton estimated that the album would cost £8,000 to produce; however, Wilson said in 2006 that the up-front cost ended at £18,000 (equivalent to £88,600 in 2025).

== Recording ==
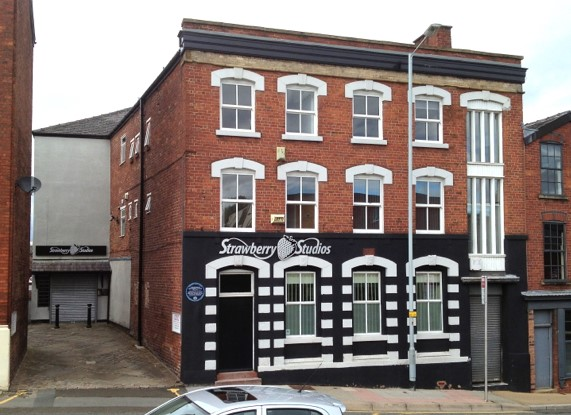
Strawberry Studios, where the album was recorded and mixed over three weekends, pictured in 2013

Unknown Pleasures was recorded at Strawberry Studios in Stockport over three weekends between 1 and 17 April 1979, with Martin Hannett producing. Hannett, who believed that punk rock was sonically conservative because of its refusal to use studio technology to create sonic space, used a number of unusual production techniques and sound effects on the album, including several AMS 15-80s digital delays, the Marshall Time Modulator, tape echo and bounce, as well as the sound of a bottle smashing, someone eating crisps, backwards guitar and the sound of the Strawberry Studios lift with a Leslie speaker "whirring inside". He also used the sound of a basement toilet. Hannett recorded Curtis's vocals for "Insight" down a telephone line so he could achieve the "requisite distance". Hannett later said: "[Joy Division] were a gift to a producer, because they didn't have a clue. They didn't argue". Referring to the recording sessions, Hook remembered: "Sumner started using a kit-built Powertran Transcendent 2000 synthesiser, most notably on 'I Remember Nothing', where it vied with the sound of Rob Gretton smashing bottles with Steve and his Walther replica pistol." During the recording, Morris invested in a Syndrum because he thought he saw one on the cover of Can's 1971 album Tago Mago.

AllMusic wrote that Hannett's production on Unknown Pleasures was "as much a hallmark as the music itself", describing it as "emphasizing space in the most revelatory way since the dawn of dub". Describing Hannett's production techniques, Hook said: "[He] didn't think straight, he thought sideways. He confused you and made you do something you didn't expect." Hook went on to say: "Derek Bramwood of Strawberry Studios said that you can take a group that have got on brilliantly for 20 years, put them in a studio with Martin and within five minutes, they'll be trying to slash each other's throats." However, Hook went on to say that Hannett was only as good as the material he had to work with: "We gave him great songs, and like a top chef, he added some salt and pepper and some herbs and served up the dish. But he needed our ingredients." The band members' opinions differed on the "spacious, atmospheric sound" of the album, which did not reflect their more aggressive live sound. Sumner said: "The music was loud and heavy, and we felt that Martin had toned it down, especially with the guitars. The production inflicted this dark, doomy mood over the album: we'd drawn this picture in black and white, and Martin had coloured it in for us. We resented it ..." Hook said: "I couldn't hide my disappointment then, it sounded like Pink Floyd."

Morris disagreed, saying: "I was happy with Unknown Pleasures. My theory on things at the time was that the two things—listening to a record and going to a gig—were quite different. You don't want to hear a record when you go to a gig: you want something with a bit of energy." Curtis was also happy with the production of the album and was impressed with Hannett's work. Hook conceded in 2006: "It definitely didn't turn out sounding the way I wanted it ... But now I can see that Martin did a good job on it ... There's no two ways about it, Martin Hannett created the Joy Division sound." Hook also noted that he was able to hear Curtis's lyrics and Sumner's guitar parts for the first time on the record, because during gigs the band played too loudly.

== Music ==
Disorder
A sample of the song Disorder, one of the tracks on the album

Journalists have noted the "dry vocal delivery" of lead singer Ian Curtis on Unknown Pleasures. Bernard Sumner's guitar work has been characterised as "atmospheric, yet always distorted and punchy". Peter Hook played bass using a pick. Stephen Morris' drumming has been characterised as "a dancier take on gloom-rock rhythm".

== Artwork and packaging ==
Peter Saville, who had previously designed posters for Manchester's Factory club in 1978, designed the cover of the album. Sumner or Morris, depending on the account, chose the image used on the cover, which is based on an image of radio waves from pulsar CP 1919, from The Cambridge Encyclopaedia of Astronomy. Saville reversed the image from black-on-white to white-on-black, against the band's stated preference for the original. "I was afraid it might look a little cheap. I was convinced that it was just sexier in black" since it represented a signal from space. He printed it on textured card for the original version of the album.

It is not a Fourier analysis as sometimes stated; rather, it is an image of the intensity of successive radio pulses, as stated in the Cambridge Encyclopaedia. In simple terms, the image is a ridgeline plot of the radio emissions given out by a pulsar, a "rotating neutron star". Originally named CP 1919, the pulsar was discovered in November 1967 by student Jocelyn Bell Burnell and her supervisor Antony Hewish at Cambridge University. As the star turns, it emits electromagnetic radiation in a beam like a lighthouse, which can be picked up by radio telescopes. Each line on the image is an individual pulse. They are not exactly the same each time as the long distance the beam travels introduces interference.

The image was originally created by radio astronomer Harold Craft at the Arecibo Observatory for his 1970 doctoral dissertation as a way to visualise smaller pulses within larger ones, which might help explain what had been causing the pulses. He was unaware for years that the image was associated with the album cover until a friend told him; afterwards he bought a copy because he felt he should have one as the creator of the image.

Susie Goldring, reviewing the album for BBC Online said: "The duochrome Peter Saville cover of this first Joy Division album speaks volumes. Its white on black lines reflect a pulse of power, a surge of bass, and raw angst. If the cover doesn't draw you in, the music will."

=== Iconic status ===
The cover image became strongly associated with the band's fans at goth gatherings later in the 1980s, after Joy Division's surviving members had become New Order. In the 21st century, it started to become an iconic image outside Joy Division fandom. Raf Simons collaborated with Saville on a 2003 clothing line that used the plot; three years later Supreme followed suit. The cover of Vince Staples' 2015 album Summertime '06 is based on the Unknown Pleasures image.

In 2012, the Disney corporation used the cover image for a t-shirt with Mickey Mouse, which was taken as a joke but not meant as one. Saville explains the image's adaptability as a result of it being "cool, in all of the meanings, from cool to cold".

=== Inner sleeve ===
The inner sleeve features a black-and-white photograph of a door with a hand near the handle. It was some years later before Saville discovered that the photograph was Hand Through a Doorway, a well-known picture by Ralph Gibson.

== Release ==
Unknown Pleasures was initially printed in a run of 10,000 copies, with 5,000 copies being sold within the first two weeks of release, and a further 10,000 copies being sold over the following six months. Initially, sales of Unknown Pleasures were slow until the release of the non-album single, "Transmission", and unsold copies occupied the Factory Records office in the flat of label co-founder Alan Erasmus.

Following the release of "Transmission", Unknown Pleasures sold out of its initial pressing, with this prompting further pressings. Unknown Pleasures created approximately £50,000 in profit, to be shared between Factory Records and the band; however, Tony Wilson spent most of these profits on Factory projects. By the conclusion of a critically acclaimed promotional tour supporting Buzzcocks in November 1979, Unknown Pleasures had neared 15,000 copies sold.

Unknown Pleasures failed to chart on the UK Albums Chart. However, following Curtis's suicide in May 1980 and the release of their second album, Closer, in July, it was reissued and reached No. 71 at the end of that August. It fared better on the UK Indie Chart, placing at No. 2 on the first chart to be published in January 1980 and going on to top the chart following its reissue, spending 136 weeks on the chart in total. The 40th-anniversary reissue of the album charted at number 5 in the UK Albums Chart when it was released in 2019, making Unknown Pleasures Joy Division's highest-charting album.

In 2007, remastered versions of both Unknown Pleasures and the posthumous studio album Closer—plus the 1981 compilation album Still—were re-released, with the remastered version of Unknown Pleasures including a bonus disc of a live recording of the band playing at The Factory in Manchester on 13 July 1979. The album was also re-released on 180-gram vinyl with the original track listing in 2007, with this version also being available in a limited edition box set with Closer and Still. The album was reissued again on limited edition 180g ruby red coloured vinyl with an alternative white sleeve, released on 7 May 2019, to coincide with the album's 40th anniversary.

== Critical reception ==
=== Initial response ===
Professional ratings
Review scores
Source	Rating
Record Mirror	4/5 stars
Smash Hits	8/10
Sounds	5/5 stars

Melody Maker called Unknown Pleasures an "opaque manifesto" and musically described it as "Gary Glitter meets the Velvet Underground". Reviewer Jon Savage declared "[leaving] the twentieth century is difficult; most people prefer to go back and nostalgise, Oh boy. Joy Division at least set a course in the present with contrails for the future—perhaps you can't ask for much more. Indeed, Unknown Pleasures may very well be one of the best, white, English, debut LPs of the year." Max Bell of NME qualified the record as "extraordinary", writing that "without trying to baffle or overreach itself, this outfit step into a labyrinth that is rarely explored with any smidgeon of real conviction". He compared it favourably to the work of Strange Days-era Doors and "German experimentalists" such as Can and Neu!. In Rolling Stone, music journalist Mikal Gilmore described the album as having "a doleful, deep-toned sound that often suggested an elaborate version of the Velvet Underground or an orderly Public Image Ltd". By August of that year the album's stature as a favourite of critics for the year was established. Robert Palmer placed the album at fourth place in his best of 1980 list for The New York Times, proclaiming the album as an "exceptional debut" and that the album "remains the group's masterpiece" and that it was "some of the most driven, desperate rock-and-roll ever recorded".

Other writers were less enthusiastic. Red Starr, writing for Smash Hits, gave the album a generally positive review, describing it as a "bleak nightmare soundtrack". Starr described the lyrics as "mysterious" and "doomy" which were "amidst intense music of urgent guitar, eerie effects and driving rhythms". However, Starr tempered his review by saying not to "expect too much" as the album was "still pretty raw". Writing about Factory for Melody Maker in September 1979, Mary Harron was less impressed: "I found at least half of [Unknown Pleasures] to be turgid and monotonous, and the vocals heavy and melodramatic—Jim Morrison without flair." She went on to say the lyrics and the atmosphere of the album "seemed to hearken back to the late Sixties" and the songs were "a series of disconnected images".

=== Legacy ===
Retrospective professional ratings
Review scores
Source	Rating
AllMusic	5/5 stars
Christgau's Record Guide	A−
The Encyclopedia of Popular Music	5/5 stars
NME	10/10
Pitchfork	10/10
Q	5/5 stars
The Rolling Stone Album Guide	5/5 stars
Select	5/5 stars
Spin Alternative Record Guide	9/10
Uncut	5/5 stars

Retrospective critical writing on the album has been virtually unanimous in its praise. In 1994, Jon Savage described the music as "a definitive Northern Gothic statement: guilt-ridden, romantic, claustrophobic". Analysing Curtis's work, music journalist Richard Cook remarked in 1983: "sex has disappeared from these unknown pleasures; it is an aftermath of passion where everything's (perhaps) lost". Stuart Maconie of Select deemed Unknown Pleasures "music without a past or a future but with the muscularity of all great rock" and "one of the greatest first albums ever".

Ned Raggett, reviewing the album for AllMusic, described Unknown Pleasures as "All visceral, all emotional, all theatrical, all perfect—one of the best albums ever." Robert Christgau said that it was Curtis's "passionate gravity that makes the clumsy, disquieting music so convincing". Colin Larkin called the music "distinctive and disturbing" in his Encyclopedia of Popular Music (2011), while highlighting "She's Lost Control", where Curtis was "at his most manically arresting". In relation to the remastered re-released album in 2007, the British music magazine NME described the album as "simply one of the best records ever made, and is still powerful enough to floor you 28 years on".

In 2000, it was voted number 249 in Colin Larkin's All Time Top 1000 Albums. The album was also included in the book 1001 Albums You Must Hear Before You Die.

Peter Hook & the Light have played the Unknown Pleasures album in its entirety on several of their concert tours, and have recorded and released live albums of some of their gigs. Hook also named one of his books Unknown Pleasures: Inside Joy Division in 2012.

In 2016, Paste Magazine named the album as the fifth-best post-punk album of all time. Staff writer Tyler Kane wrote: "There might not have been a better band to usher in the '80s than Joy Division, a forward-thinking group of English rockers whose sum was more than its individual parts. [...] It's hard to think of another debut in the decade that took as many chances and was as self-assured as Unknown Pleasures."

In 2018, the album was adapted into an anthology of short stories, We Were Strangers, with each song being reinterpreted by a different writer.

=== Accolades ===
Publication	Country	Accolade	Year	Rank
NME	UK	All Times Top 100 Albums	1985	10
NME	UK	All Times Top 100 Albums	1993	43
NME	UK	The Greatest Albums of The '70s	1993	4
NME	UK	Top 100 Albums of All Time	2003	41
NME	UK	The 100 Greatest British Albums Ever	2006	44
NME	UK	The 500 Greatest Albums of All Time	2013	40
Mojo	UK	Top 50 Punk Albums	2003	26
Pitchfork	US	Top 100 Albums of the 1970s	2004	9
Q	UK	The 50 Best Albums of the 70s	1998	4
Q	UK	100 Greatest British Albums	2002	19
Q	UK	Top 20 Albums from 1970 to 1979	2004	9
Rolling Stone	US	50 Coolest Records	2002	24
Rolling Stone	US	100 Best Debut Albums of All Time	2013	20
Rolling Stone	US	The 500 Greatest Albums of All Time	2020	211
Spin	US	50 Most Essential Punk Records	2001	11
Spin	US	Fifteen Most Influential Albums	2003	8

(*) designates unordered lists.

== Track listing ==
All tracks are written by Ian Curtis, Peter Hook, Stephen Morris and Bernard Sumner.

Side one (Outside)
No.	Title	Length
1.	"Disorder"	3:36
2.	"Day of the Lords"	4:48
3.	"Candidate"	3:05
4.	"Insight"	4:30
5.	"New Dawn Fades"	4:48
Total length:		20:47

Side two (Inside)
No.	Title	Length
6.	"She's Lost Control"	3:56
7.	"Shadowplay"	3:54
8.	"Wilderness"	2:38
9.	"Interzone"	2:16
10.	"I Remember Nothing"	5:53
Total length:		18:37 39:24

2007 CD remaster bonus disc (live at the Factory, Manchester, 13 July 1979)
No.	Title	Length
1.	"Dead Souls"	4:25
2.	"The Only Mistake"	4:12
3.	"Insight"	3:52
4.	"Candidate"	2:08
5.	"Wilderness"	2:32
6.	"She's Lost Control"	3:47
7.	"Shadowplay"	3:35
8.	"Disorder"	3:29
9.	"Interzone"	2:05
10.	"Atrocity Exhibition"	6:14
11.	"Novelty"	4:28
12.	"Transmission"	3:50
Total length:		44:37

== Personnel ==
Credits adapted from AllMusic:

Joy Division

- Ian Curtis – vocals
- Bernard Sumner – guitar, keyboards
- Peter Hook – bass guitar, lead vocals on 'Interzone'
- Stephen Morris – drums, percussion

Production

- Martin Hannett – producer, sound effects, synthesisers
- Chris Nagle – engineer
- Peter Saville – design
- Chris Mathan – design

== Charts ==
=== Weekly charts ===
Chart (1980–1981)	Peak position
New Zealand Albums (RMNZ)	1
UK Albums (Official Charts)	71

Chart (2019)	Peak position
Austrian Albums (Ö3 Austria)	23
Belgian Albums (Ultratop Flanders)	65
Belgian Albums (Ultratop Wallonia)	194
German Albums (Offizielle Top 100)	20
Hungarian Albums (MAHASZ)	26
Italian Albums (FIMI)	34
Portuguese Albums (AFP)	11
Spanish Albums (PROMUSICAE)	18
Swiss Albums (Schweizer Hitparade)	98
UK Albums (Official Charts)	5

=== Year-end charts ===
Chart (1981)	Position
New Zealand Albums (RMNZ)	35

== Certifications ==
Region	Certification	Certified units/sales
Italy (FIMI)	Gold	25,000^{‡}
New Zealand (RMNZ)	Gold	7,500^{^}
United Kingdom (BPI)	Platinum	300,000^{‡}
^{^} Shipments figures based on certification alone.^{‡} Sales+streaming figures based on certification alone.

== Sources ==
- Curtis, Deborah (1995). Touching from a Distance. Ian Curtis and Joy Division. London: Faber and Faber. ISBN 0-57117445-0.
- Gimarc, George (2005). Punk Diary. The Ultimate Trainspotter's Guide to Underground Rock 1970–1982. Milwaukee, Wisconsin: Backbeat Books. ISBN 978-0-879-30848-3.
- Hook, Peter (2013) [2012]. Unknown Pleasures. Inside Joy Division. London: Simon & Schuster. ISBN 978-1-471-12980-3.
- Ott, Chris (2004). Unknown Pleasures (33⅓ series ed.). New York City: Bloomsbury Publishing USA. ISBN 978-1-441-13555-1.
- Palmer, Robert (25 December 1980). "New York Times Best Records of 1980". The Columbia Record. p. 99 – via Newspapers.com.
- Reynolds, Simon (2009) [2005]. Rip it Up and Start Again. Postpunk 1978–1984. London: Faber & Faber. ISBN 978-0-571-25227-5.
- Sumner, Bernard (2014). Chapter and Verse – New Order, Joy Division and Me. London: Bantam Press. ISBN 978-1-448-17132-3.
