= Closer (Joy Division album) =

Studio album by Joy Division
- Released: 18 July 1980
- Recorded: 18–30 March 1980
- Studio: Britannia Row (Islington)
- Genres: Post-punk; gothic rock; new wave; dark wave
- Length: 44:16
- Label: Factory
- Producer: Martin Hannett

Joy Division chronology
Unknown Pleasures (1979)	Closer (1980)	Still (1981)

Closer (Note: Pronounced /ˈkloʊsər/, as in "closer to the centre".) is the second and final studio album by the English rock band Joy Division, released on 18 July 1980 by Factory Records. Produced by Martin Hannett, it was recorded two months before and released two months after the suicide of the band's lead singer and lyricist Ian Curtis. The album reached No. 6 on the UK Albums Chart and peaked at No. 3 in New Zealand in September 1981. Closer was also named NME Album of the Year. It was remastered and re-released in 2007.

Today, Closer is widely recognized as a seminal release of the post-punk era. Following the release of the non-album single "Love Will Tear Us Apart" in June 1980, the remaining members re-formed as New Order.

== Composition and recording ==
The songs on Closer were mostly written or structured during jam sessions in the band's practice room. The songs were drawn from two distinct periods. The earlier guitar-driven compositions were written during the latter half of 1979: "Atrocity Exhibition", "Passover", "Colony", "A Means to an End" and "Twenty Four Hours". All were played live during that year, with some being recorded for various radio sessions. The album's other songs were written in early 1980, and included more prominent use of synthesisers: "Isolation", "Heart and Soul", "The Eternal" and "Decades". "Atrocity Exhibition" features a Synare drum synth put through a fuzz pedal.

"While we were working on Closer, Ian said to me that doing this album felt very strange, because he felt that all his words were writing themselves. He also said that he had this terrible claustrophobic feeling that he was in a whirlpool and being pulled down, drowning."

— Bernard Sumner, recollecting on Ian Curtis's mindset during the recording sessions for Closer. October 2007.

The fiction of J. G. Ballard was a significant influence on the lyrics, especially The Atrocity Exhibition – a collection of "condensed novels" published in 1970 – which shares its title with the opening track.

Closer was recorded between 18 and 30 March 1980 at Britannia Row Studios in Islington, London. It was produced by Martin Hannett. His production has been highly praised, with Pitchfork describing it as "sepulchral". However, as with their debut album, both Sumner and bassist Peter Hook were unhappy with Hannett's work. Hook later complained that the track "Atrocity Exhibition" was mixed on one of his days off, and when he heard the final product he was disappointed that the abrasiveness of his guitar part had been laden with effects and toned down. He wrote; "I was like, head in hands, oh fucking hell, it's happening again. Unknown Pleasures number two ... Martin [Hannett] had melted the guitar with his Marshall Time Waster. Made it sound like somebody strangling a cat, and to my mind, absolutely killed the song. I was so annoyed with him and went in and gave him a piece of my mind but he just turned around and told me to fuck off."

== Release ==
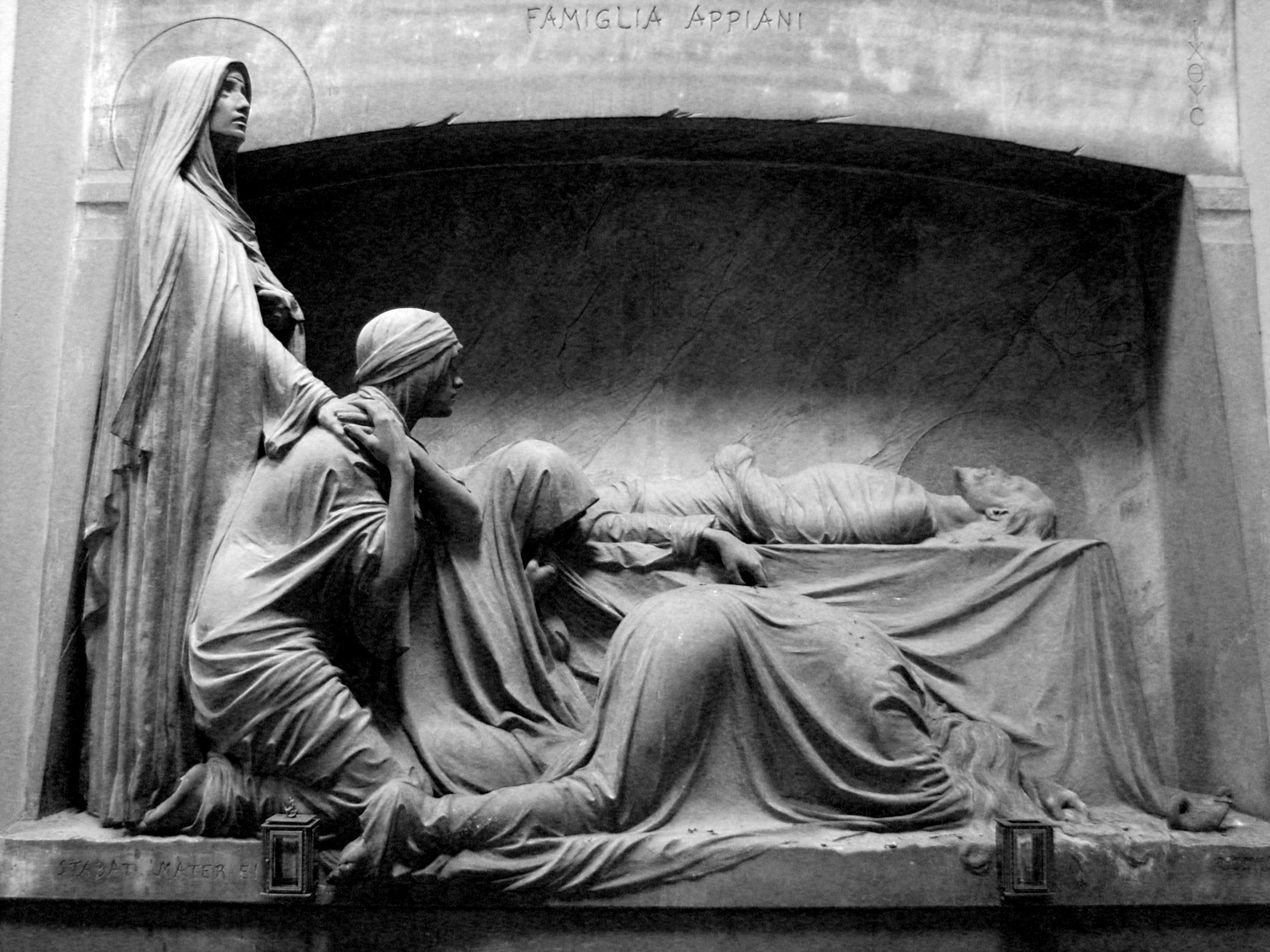
The Appiani family tomb, as seen in the Monumental Cemetery of Staglieno, Italy. It was sculpted by Demetrio Paernio in 1910. A photograph of this tomb adorns the cover of Closer.

The album cover was designed by Martyn Atkins and Peter Saville, with a photograph of the Appiani family tomb in Genoa's Monumental Cemetery of Staglieno adorning much of the sleeve. The photograph was taken by Bernard Pierre Wolff in 1978. In a 2007 documentary on the band, designer Saville commented that he, upon learning of singer Ian Curtis's suicide, expressed immediate concern over the album's design as it depicted a funeral theme, remarking "we've got a tomb on the cover of the album!" (Note: The decision to have this photograph adorn the front cover of Closer had been agreed to by all four members of the band; the sleeve itself was designed prior to Curtis's suicide.)

Closer was released on 18 July 1980 by Factory Records, as a vinyl LP. The album reached No. 6 on the UK Albums Chart. It also peaked at No. 3 in New Zealand in September 1981. Closer was also named NME Album of the Year. The album, along with Unknown Pleasures and Still, was remastered and re-released in 2007. As with Unknown Pleasures and Still, the remaster was packaged with a bonus live disc, recorded at the University of London Union.

Factory Records boss Tony Wilson was pleased with the final album; he predicted that it would be a commercial success. Sumner recalled him saying at the time, "You know, Bernard, this time next year you'll be lounging by a swimming pool in LA with a cocktail in your hand." Sumner was less optimistic and "just thought it was the most utterly ridiculous thing anyone had ever said to me."

== Critical reception ==
Retrospective professional ratings
Review scores
Source	Rating
AllMusic	5/5 stars
Christgau's Record Guide	A−
Encyclopedia of Popular Music	5/5 stars
NME	10/10
Pitchfork	10/10
Q	5/5 stars
The Rolling Stone Album Guide	5/5 stars
Select	5/5 stars
Spin Alternative Record Guide	10/10
Uncut	5/5 stars

Closer was released to immediate and widespread critical acclaim. Sounds critic Dave McCullough wrote that it contained "dark strokes of gothic rock". He described the album as "breathtaking rock music, a peak of current peaks, a sharing of something that's in [...] others at this time, but at the same time defining those black notions and leaving them unmatched." Writing for Smash Hits, Alastair Macaulay described the album as an "exercise in dark controlled passion" and wrote that its music "stands up on its own as the band's epitaph". Writing for Melody Maker, Paolo Hewitt described the album as "probably some of the most irresistible dance music we'll hear this year [and] a far cry for sure from the almost suffocating claustrophobic world of the debut album," adding that "the best (and most subversive?) rock music has always dealt head-on with emotions and thought rather than clichéd, standardised stances; that's what makes Closer and Joy Division so important."

At the end of 1980, Closer was voted the 22nd best record of the year in the Pazz & Jop, an annual poll of American critics published by The Village Voice. Robert Christgau, the poll's supervisor, deemed the album an improvement over Unknown Pleasures in a retrospective review: "Curtis's torment is less oppressive here because it's less dominant—the dark, roiling, off-center rhythms have a life of their own. And if last time the dancier material had hooks, this time even the dirges have something closely resembling tunes." Rolling Stone's Mikal Gilmore, in a 1981 profile of the band's work, wrote: "The music turns leaden, gray and steady because it means to fulfill a vision of a world where suffering is unremitting and nothingness is quiescent."

In a book titled 1001 Albums You Must Hear Before You Die, published in 2005, Closer is defined as a "quantum leap" in terms of progression when compared to the band's debut album. According to Colin Larkin, Closer has since been "deservedly regarded by many critics as the most brilliant rock album of the 80s"; Larkin himself found the record flawless, writing in his Encyclopedia of Popular Music (2011) that it showed Joy Division at their creative peak and "maturity in every area" of their music. In his review of the 2007 reissue of the album, Pitchfork critic Joshua Klein described the album as "even more austere, more claustrophobic, more inventive, more beautiful and more haunting than its predecessor", calling it "Joy Division's start-to-finish masterpiece; a flawless encapsulation of everything the group sought to achieve."

== Legacy ==
Closer has been highly acclaimed, and is often cited as Joy Division's finest work, being considered by music critics such as Mark Fisher to be "the crown jewel of post-punk" and receiving praise from artists such as George Michael. The album was voted number 1 in the 1980 Albums of the Year poll conducted by music magazine NME, and would be listed as number 157 in Rolling Stone's 2003 list of the 500 Greatest Albums of All Time, maintaining the rank in the 2012 revision, and dropping to number 309 in the 2020 edition.

By 1982, Closer had sold over 250,000 copies worldwide, with the posthumous single "Love Will Tear Us Apart" having also sold over 160,000 copies. In 1995 Closer was ranked one of the top 100 alternative albums ever to be released by Spin magazine (placing at number 69). In 2002, the American online magazine Pitchfork listed Closer as the 10th best album to be released in the 1980s.

The album placed at number 72 on NME's list of the 100 greatest British albums ever to be released. In addition, Q magazine placed Closer at number 8 in a list compiled of the 40 greatest albums to be released in the 1980s. In 2012, Slant Magazine listed the album at number 7 upon their compiled list of the best albums of the 1980s. In 2020, Rolling Stone included Closer in their "80 Greatest albums of 1980" list.

== Track listing ==
All tracks are written by Ian Curtis, Peter Hook, Stephen Morris and Bernard Sumner.

Side one
No.	Title	Length
1.	"Atrocity Exhibition"	6:06
2.	"Isolation"	2:53
3.	"Passover"	4:46
4.	"Colony"	3:55
5.	"A Means to an End"	4:07

Side two
No.	Title	Length
6.	"Heart and Soul"	5:51
7.	"Twenty Four Hours"	4:26
8.	"The Eternal"	6:07
9.	"Decades"	6:10
Total length:		44:16

Note: the original vinyl disc only contained a small etching on the disk marking the A and B sides.

2007 CD remaster bonus disc (live at the University of London Union, 8 February 1980)
No.	Title	Length
1.	"Dead Souls"	4:59
2.	"Glass"	3:42
3.	"A Means to an End"	4:01
4.	"Twenty Four Hours"	4:06
5.	"Passover"	4:54
6.	"Insight"	4:01
7.	"Colony"	4:04
8.	"These Days"	4:17
9.	"Love Will Tear Us Apart"	3:14
10.	"Isolation"	4:42
11.	"The Eternal"	6:30
12.	"Digital"	3:14
Total length:		51:44

== Personnel ==
Joy Division

- Ian Curtis – vocals, guitar (track 6), melodica (track 9)
- Bernard Sumner – guitar (all except tracks 1, 2 and 6), bass guitar (track 1), synthesisers (tracks 2, 6, 8, and 9)
- Peter Hook – bass guitar (all except track 1), guitar (track 1), six-string bass guitar (tracks 3, 6, and 8)
- Stephen Morris – drums (all except tracks 2 and 8), electronic drums (tracks 2, 4, 8, 9), percussion (all except track 2)

Production

- Martin Hannett – production, engineering
- Michael Johnson – engineering assistance
- Jon Caffery – engineering

== Charts ==
Chart performance for Closer
Chart (1980–1981)	Peak position
New Zealand Albums (RMNZ)	3
UK Albums (Official Charts)	6

Chart (2017–2020)	Peak position
Austrian Albums (Ö3 Austria)	68
Belgian Albums (Ultratop Flanders)	124
Belgian Albums (Ultratop Wallonia)	27
German Albums (Offizielle Top 100)	13
Hungarian Albums (MAHASZ)	13
Irish Albums (Official Charts)	31
Italian Albums (FIMI)	31
Polish Albums (ZPAV)	23
Portuguese Albums (AFP)	43
Scottish Albums (Official Charts)	4
Spanish Albums (PROMUSICAE)	39
Swiss Albums (Schweizer Hitparade)	23

== Certifications ==
Region	Certification	Certified units/sales
United Kingdom (BPI)	Gold	100,000^{*}
^{*} Sales figures based on certification alone.

== See also ==
- List of works published posthumously

== Sources ==
- Hook, Peter (2013) [2012]. Unknown Pleasures. Inside Joy Division. London: Simon & Schuster. ISBN 978-1-471-12980-3. Archived from the original on 12 June 2021.
- Sumner, Bernard (2014). Chapter and Verse - New Order, Joy Division and Me. London: Bantam Press. ISBN 978-1-448-17132-3. Archived from the original on 12 June 2021.
