= Transmission (song) =

1979 song by Joy Division

- 7" cover

Single by Joy Division
- B-side: "Novelty"
- Released: 7 October 1979
- Recorded: 28 July – 4 August 1979
- Genre: Post-punk; neo-psychedelia; punk rock; art rock
- Length: 3:36
- Label: Factory
- Songwriters: Ian Curtis; Peter Hook; Stephen Morris; Bernard Sumner
- Producer: Martin Hannett

Joy Division singles chronology
"Transmission" (1979)	"Licht und Blindheit" (1980)

Alternative cover
- 12" cover

Music video
- "Transmission" on YouTube

"Transmission" is a song by the English post-punk band Joy Division. Originally recorded in 1978 for the band's aborted self-titled album, it was later re-recorded the following year at a faster tempo and released by record label Factory as the band's debut single.

== Release ==
"Transmission" was released on 7" vinyl on 7 October 1979 by record label Factory. It was re-released as a 12" single with a different sleeve on 20 February 1981. The single charted twice in New Zealand, debuting at number 2 in September 1981 and re-appearing again at number 24 in July 1984.

The song was performed once by the band on television, for the BBC Something Else programme. Twenty seconds of the song is shown in the movie Control (2007), directed by Anton Corbijn, a film based on the biography of Ian's wife, Deborah Curtis's Touching from a Distance.

== Reception ==
Greil Marcus has a chapter on this song in his book The History of Rock 'n' Roll in Ten Songs. According to Marcus, "'Transmission' is not an argument. It's a dramatization of the realization that the act of listening to the radio is a suicidal gesture. It will kill your mind. It will rob your soul." Marcus also quotes the band's bassist Peter Hook about the importance of this song: "We were doing a soundcheck at the Mayflower, in May, and we played 'Transmission': people had been moving around, and they all stopped to listen. I realized that was our first great song." (Note: In 2018, Peter Hook would recollect that on the first occasion the band had played "Transmission" at a gig, the entire audience at the venue ceased "literally what they were doing to listen and to turn round and watch us".)

== Legacy ==
In May 2007, NME magazine placed "Transmission" at number 20 in its list of the 50 "Greatest Indie Anthems Ever", one place below "Love Will Tear Us Apart". In 2016, Pitchfork placed "Transmission" at number 10 in its list of "The 200 Best Songs of the 1970s".

== Cover versions ==
"Transmission" has been covered by: Low (on its EP Transmission); Bauhaus (as well as by frontman Peter Murphy on his solo tours); Innerpartysystem; The Weather Station; Girl in a Coma; and Hot Chip on the 2009 War Child charity album Heroes. It was played by The Smashing Pumpkins on their Adore Tour in 1998, with performances of the song usually lasting from 15 to 25 minutes. It was also covered by the cast of the biopic Control, on the film's soundtrack. In 2009, the song was covered by Russian post-punk group Последние танки в Париже as "Радиоволна", in 2012 by Italian black metal band Forgotten Tomb, by Nomeansno, and by BadBadNotGood with the song "Mass Appeal" on their debut album, BBNG.

== Track listing ==
Both tracks written by Joy Division.

7"/12"

1. "Transmission" – 3:36
2. "Novelty" – 3:59

== Sources ==
- Hewitt, Ben (15 July 2015). "Joy Division: 10 of the Best". The Guardian.
- Hook, Peter (2013). Unknown Pleasures. Inside Joy Division. London: Simon & Schuster. ISBN 978-1-4711-2980-3.
- Morris, Stephen (2019). Record Play Pause: Confessions of a Post-Punk Percussionist: the Joy Division Years: Volume I. Constable. ISBN 978-1-4721-2620-7.
- Ott, Chris (2004). Unknown Pleasures (33⅓ series ed.). New York City: Bloomsbury Publishing USA. ISBN 978-1-441-13555-1.
- Savage, Jon (2014). So This is Permanence: Joy Division Lyrics and Notebooks. Faber & Faber. ISBN 978-0-5713-0955-9.
- Savage, Jon (21 July 1979). "Joy Division: Unknown Pleasures". Melody Maker.
- Zagorski-Thomas, Simon (2019). The Art of Record Production: Creative Practice in the Studio. Routledge. ISBN 978-1-1382-0516-1.
