= Bernard Sumner =

English musician (born 1956)

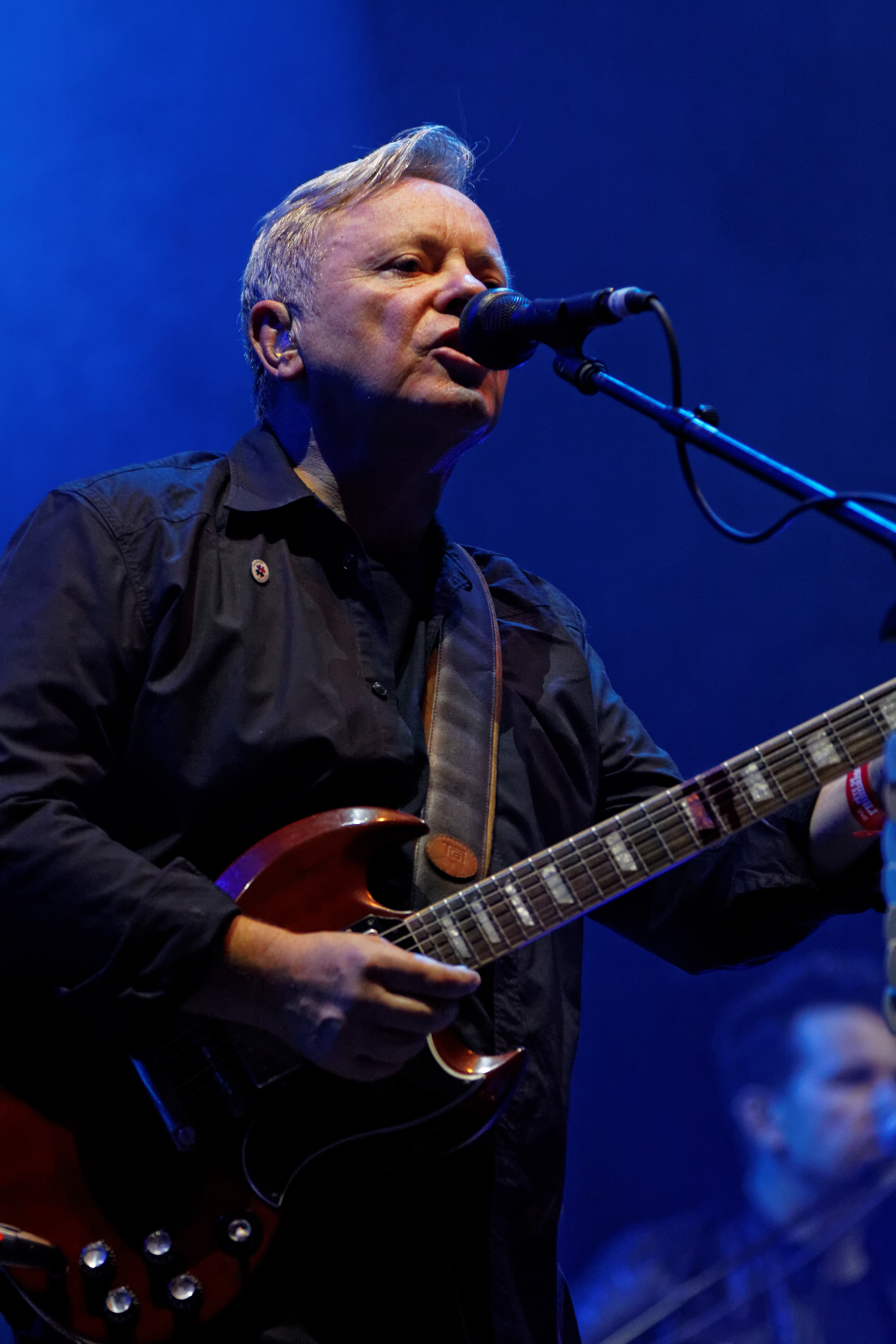
- Sumner performing with New Order in September 2012

Background information
- Also known as: Bernard Albrecht; Bernard Dicken; Barney
- Born: 4 January 1956 (age 70); Manchester, England
- Genres: Rock; post-punk; new wave; synth-pop; electronica
- Occupations: Singer; songwriter; musician; record producer
- Instruments: Vocals; guitar; keyboards; synthesiser; melodica
- Years active: 1973–present
- Labels: Factory; London; Warner Bros.; Parlophone; Mute; Triple Echo
- Member of: New Order
- Formerly of: Joy Division; Electronic; Bad Lieutenant

Bernard Sumner (born 4 January 1956) is an English musician. He is a founding member of the bands Joy Division, New Order, Electronic, and Bad Lieutenant. Sumner was an early force in several areas, including the post-punk, synth-pop, and techno music scenes, as well as their various related genres, and was an early influence on the Manchester music scene that presaged the Madchester movement of the late 1980s centred on Factory Records and The Haçienda club in Manchester. He and drummer Stephen Morris are the only two continuous members of New Order, who have also appeared on all the band's albums.

He began his career playing guitar and keyboards for Joy Division. Following lead singer Ian Curtis's death, the remaining members of Joy Division formed New Order with Sumner taking on lead vocal duties. His complex electronic compositions became less guitar-driven and more focused on electronic keyboards, synthesisers, and programming throughout the 1980s and 1990s. He formed Electronic with Johnny Marr in the late 1980s as a creative outlet outside of New Order, which continued after New Order went on hiatus in 1993. New Order became active again from 1998 through 2006, after which he returned to a more traditional rock context with the band Bad Lieutenant. He continues to record and perform with the latest iteration of New Order, who reformed in 2011.

In 2026, Sumner was inducted into the Rock and Roll Hall of Fame as a member of Joy Division/New Order after two previous nominations.

== Early life and education ==
Bernard Sumner was born on 4 January 1956 in Crumpsall Hospital (now North Manchester General Hospital) in Manchester, England. He has also used the surnames Dicken (similar to his stepfather's name Dickin) and Albrecht. He lived at his grandparents’ house with his mother, who had cerebral palsy.

Sumner was educated at Salford Grammar School, before joining Cosgrove Hall Productions as a paint and trace artist for cartoon animations for television.

== Career ==
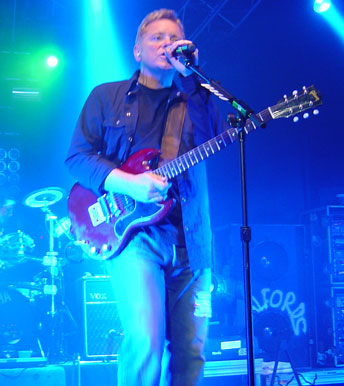
Sumner with New Order in NYC, 2005

Through his long career, Sumner has played music in many overlapping genres, including rock, synth-pop electronica, post-punk, and new wave.

=== Joy Division ===
Sumner was a founding member of Joy Division, formed at Salford in 1976. He and childhood friend Peter Hook both attended the fabled Sex Pistols concert at Manchester's Free Trade Hall on 4 June 1976 and whose music inspired them to perform together. Joy Division was widely considered one of the most influential bands of the era. Sumner was lead guitarist (his main guitars were a Gibson SG and a custom Shergold Masquerader), as well as playing electronic keyboards and made his first vocal appearance on record singing the chorus of "Walked in Line" on the Warsaw album. In May 1980, after the suicide of its lead singer, Ian Curtis, Joy Division disbanded. Sumner said he didn't want to see the body of Curtis because, "I wanted to remember him as he was when he was alive."

=== New Order ===
Sumner and remaining band members Peter Hook and Stephen Morris started a new band named New Order, joined by keyboardist Gillian Gilbert in October 1980. Though Hook, Morris, and Gilbert also contributed vocals on some early tracks, Sumner emerged as the band's permanent singer and lyricist, alongside playing guitar and keyboards.

Through a series of splits and reformations, the band has released ten studio albums. Sumner and Morris are the only members to be part of every lineup.

=== Electronic ===
In 1989, Sumner joined up with former Smiths guitarist Johnny Marr to form Electronic. The Pet Shop Boys' Neil Tennant collaborated on two tracks on their debut eponymous album, providing vocals. Sumner was their singer, guitarist, keyboardist and lyricist. Electronic released two other albums until a quiet disband in 2001 for Sumner to focus his efforts on New Order. Sumner occasionally appears to sing Electronic songs at Marr's concerts.

=== Bad Lieutenant ===
Bad Lieutenant included fellow New Order member Phil Cunningham and Jake Evans of Rambo & Leroy. Stephen Morris of New Order and Blur bassist Alex James also performed on the band's debut album. Sumner provided vocals, guitar and lyrics. Bad Lieutenant disbanded after New Order reformed in 2011.

=== Other projects ===
In 1981, Pauline Murray and The Invisible Girls released their last single "Searching for Heaven", which included a guitar solo by Sumner, although he was not credited in the sleeves of its 7" and 10" edition at the time. In 1983, Sumner co-produced, with Donald Johnson, the single "The Great Divide"/"Love in a Strange Place" by the band Foreign Press. Foreign Press (aka Emergency) had had a long history with Sumner through both Joy Division and New Order.

In 1990, he worked with former Factory Records label mates A Certain Ratio, remixing their song "Won't Stop Loving You". He has also recorded tracks with fellow Mancunians 808 State and Sub Sub. Sumner appeared as guest singer and guitarist (alongside Primal Scream's Bobby Gillespie) on The Chemical Brothers' 1999 album Surrender, on the track "Out of Control"; and in a 2005 Chemical Brothers show at the Brixton Academy, Sumner appeared live onstage as a special guest on this track. He has also lent vocals and guitar to a track ("Miracle Cure") on German trance outfit Blank & Jones 2008 release, "The Logic of Pleasure", and appeared on the Primal Scream track "Shoot Speed Kill Light" from their 2000 album XTRMNTR.

He has produced several remixes for tracks such as Technotronic's "Rockin' Over the Beat" (which was featured in the Teenage Mutant Ninja Turtles III soundtrack). He served as a record producer and/or songwriter for other Factory Records acts, including Happy Mondays, Shark Vegas, Abecedarians, 52nd Street and Section 25.

== Personal life ==
Sumner married Sue Barlow on 28 October 1978 but they later divorced. He has since remarried and has four children.

== In film ==
Sumner was portrayed by John Simm in the 2002 film 24 Hour Party People and James Anthony Pearson in the 2007 film Control.

== Discography ==
=== Joy Division ===
- Unknown Pleasures (1979)
- Closer (1980)

=== New Order ===
- Movement (1981)
- Power, Corruption & Lies (1983)
- Low-Life (1985)
- Brotherhood (1986)
- Technique (1989)
- Republic (1993)
- Get Ready (2001)
- Waiting for the Sirens' Call (2005)
- Lost Sirens (2013)
- Music Complete (2015)

=== Electronic ===
- Electronic (1991)
- Raise the Pressure (1996)
- Twisted Tenderness (1999)

=== Bad Lieutenant ===
- Never Cry Another Tear (2009)

=== Collaborations ===
- Section 25 – "Sakura" (keyboards, 1982)
- 52nd Street – "Look into My Eyes" (synthesizer, production, 1982)
- Section 25 – "Back To Wonder" / "Beating Heart" (production, 1983)
- Quando Quango – "Love Tempo" (production, 1983)
- The Durutti Column – "I Get Along Without You Very Well" / "Prayer" (production, 1983)
- A Certain Ratio – "I Need Someone Tonite" (synthesizer, 1983)
- 52nd Street – "Cool As Ice" / "Twice As Nice" (synthesizer, production, 1983)
- Paul Haig – "The Only Truth" (guitar, production, 1984)
- Marcel King – "Reach For Love" / "Keep On Dancing" (synthesizer, production, 1984)
- Quando Quango – "2 From Quando" (production, 1984)
- Section 25 – From The Hip (composer (Note: Composer on the tracks "The Process" and "Inspiration".), production, 1984)
- Section 25 – "Looking From A Hilltop (Restructure)" (synthesizer, production, 1984)
- Section 25 – "Crazy Wisdom" (production, 1985)
- Shark Vegas – "You Hurt Me" (guitar, production, 1985)
- Paul Haig – "Love and War" (guitar, 1986)
- Section 25 – "Bad News Week" (production, 1987)
- A Certain Ratio – "Good Together" (backing vocals, 1989)
- Technotronic - "Rockin' Over the Beat" (synthesizer, production, 1989)
- The Beat Club – "Security (Remix)" (vocals, production, 1990)
- Banderas – "This Is Your Life" (backing vocals, guitar, 1991)
- 808 State – "Spanish Heart" (vocals, 1991)
- Sub Sub – "This Time I'm Not Wrong" (vocals, guitar, 1997)
- The Chemical Brothers – "Out of Control" (vocals, guitar, 1999)
- Primal Scream – "Shoot Speed Kill Light" (guitar, 2000)
- Gwen Stefani – "The Real Thing" (backing vocals, 2004)
- Blank & Jones – "Miracle Cure" (vocals, guitar, 2008)

== Bibliography ==
- Curtis, Deborah (1995). Touching from a Distance: Ian Curtis and Joy Division. London: Faber. ISBN 0-5711-7445-0.
- Bernard Sumner: Confusion – Joy Division, Electronic and New Order Versus the World, David Nolan, 2007
- Chapter and Verse – New Order, Joy Division and Me, Bernard Sumner, 2014
