= Joy Division discography =

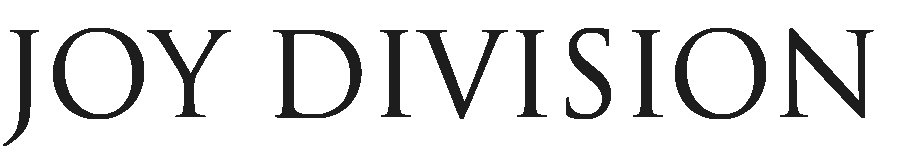
- Studio albums: 2
- Extended plays: 3
- Live albums: 5
- Compilation albums: 12
- Singles: 5
- Video albums: 2

The discography of English post-punk band Joy Division consists of two studio albums, five live albums, twelve compilation albums, three extended plays, and five singles.

Independent Joy Division was formed in 1976 by Bernard Sumner and Peter Hook after they attended a June 1976 Sex Pistols concert. The first official release as Joy Division was an extended play, An Ideal for Living (1978). After releasing four singles, they released their debut studio album, Unknown Pleasures (1979). It entered the national charts of New Zealand, United Kingdom, Austria, Belgium, Germany, Hungary, Italy, Portugal, Spain and Switzerland, and was certified silver by Federazione Industria Musicale Italiana, Recorded Music NZ, and British Phonographic Industry.

On 18 May 1980, the eve of the band's first North American tour, Curtis was found dead in his home. The band's second and final album, Closer (1980), was released two months later to critical acclaim, charting in New Zealand, United Kingdom, Austria, Belgium, German, Ireland, Italia, Poland, Portugal, Scotland Spain and Switzerland. The band re-formed as New Order, with Sumner on vocals; they later recruited Gillian Gilbert as keyboardist and second guitarist.

== Albums ==
=== Studio albums ===
List of studio albums, with selected details, chart positions and certifications
| Title | Details | Peak chart positions | | | | | Certifications |
| Title | Details | UK | UK Indie | AUS | GER | NZ | Certifications |
|---|---|---|---|---|---|---|---|
| Unknown Pleasures | Released: 15 June 1979; Label: Factory; Formats: CD, LP, cassette | 5 | 1 | 82 | 20 | 1 | BPI: Platinum |
| Closer | Released: 18 July 1980; Label: Factory; Formats: CD, LP, cassette | 6 | 1 | 23 | 13 | 3 | BPI: Gold |

=== Live albums ===
List of live albums, with selected details
| Title | Details |
|---|---|
| Preston 28 February 1980 | Released: 22 June 1999; Label: NMC; Formats: CD, LP |
| Les Bains Douches 18 December 1979 | Released: April 2001; Label: NMC; Formats: CD, LP |
| Fractured Box | Released: August 2001; Label: NMC; Format: 2-CD set |
| Re-fractured Box | Released: January 2004; Label: NMC; Format: 3-CD set |
| Eternal: Live | Released: September 2026; Label: Warner; Format: 14 CD and 2 DVD box set |

=== Compilation albums ===
List of compilation albums, with selected chart positions and certifications
| Title | Details | Peak chart positions | | | | | | | | | Certifications |
| Title | Details | UK | UK Indie | AUS | BEL (FL) | CAN | NLD | NZ | SWE | US | Certifications |
|---|---|---|---|---|---|---|---|---|---|---|---|
| Still | Released: 9 October 1981; Label: Factory; Formats: CD, 2xLP, cassette | 5 | 1 | 73 | — | — | — | 3 | 33 | — | BPI: Gold |
| Substance | Released: 11 July 1988; Label: Factory; Formats: CD, LP, cassette, DAT | 7 | 1 | 53 | — | 88 | 25 | 15 | — | 146 | BPI: Gold |
| The Peel Sessions | Released: September 1990; Label: Strange Fruit; Formats: CD, LP | 96 | — | — | — | — | — | — | — | — | |
| Permanent | Released: 19 June 1995; Label: London; Formats: CD, 2xLP, cassette | 16 | — | — | — | — | — | — | — | — | BPI: Gold |
| Heart and Soul | Released: December 1997; Label: London; Format: 4-CD set | 70 | — | — | — | — | — | — | — | — | |
| The Complete BBC Recordings | Released: August 2000; Label: Strange Fruit; Format: CD | 188 | — | — | — | — | — | — | — | — | |
| The Best of Joy Division | Released: 24 March 2008; Labels: London, Rhino; Format: 2-CD set | 63 | — | 97 | 45 | — | 100 | — | — | — | BPI: Gold |
| +− Singles 1978–80 | Released: 6 December 2010; Labels: London, Rhino; Format: 10× 7", 10× 7" + 2× CD, digital download | — | — | — | — | — | — | — | — | — | |
| Total: From Joy Division to New Order | Released: 6 June 2011; Labels: WEA UK, Rhino; Format: CD | 51 | — | — | — | — | — | — | — | — | BPI: Gold |
"—" denotes a recording that did not chart or was not released in that territory.

== Extended plays ==
List of extended plays, with selected chart positions
| Title | Details | Peak chart positions | |
| Title | Details | UK | UK Indie |
|---|---|---|---|
| An Ideal for Living | Released: 3 June 1978; Label: Enigma; Formats: 7", LP | — | — |
| The Peel Sessions | Released: November 1986; Label: Strange Fruit; Format: LP | 96 | 4 |
| The Peel Sessions | Released: September 1987; Label: Strange Fruit; Format: LP | 98 | 3 |
"—" denotes a recording that did not chart or was not released in that territory.

== Singles ==
List of singles, with selected chart positions and album name
| Title | Year | Peak chart positions | | | | | Certifications | Album |
| Title | Year | UK | UK Indie | IRE | NZ (Note: All singles charted in 1981) | US Dance | Certifications | Album |
|---|---|---|---|---|---|---|---|---|
| "Transmission" | 1979 | — | 4 | — | 2 | — | | Non-album singles |
| "Licht und blindheit" (Note: "Licht und Blindheit" was released only in France as a limited edition single.) | 1980 | — | — | — | — | — | | Non-album singles |
| "Love Will Tear Us Apart" | 1980 | 13 | 1 | 19 (Note: "Love Will Tear Us Apart" did not originally chart on the Irish Singles Chart, however it did reach 19 when re-released in 1983.) | 1 | 42 | BPI: 2× Platinum; RMNZ: Platinum | Non-album singles |
| "Komakino" (Note: "Komakino" was released as a limited edition single, given away free in select record shops.) | 1980 | — | — | — | — | — | | Non-album singles |
| "Atmosphere" / "She's Lost Control" (Note: "Atmosphere" was released as a single with "She's Lost Control" as the b-side worldwide. However "She's Lost Control" was released as a single with "Atmosphere" as the b-side in the US.) | 1980 | 34 (Note: "Atmosphere" did not originally chart on the UK Singles Chart, however it did reach 34 when re-released in 1988 to promote Substance.) | 1 | 27 (Note: "Atmosphere" did not originally chart on the Irish Singles Chart, however it did reach 27 when re-released in 1988 to promote Substance.) | 1 | — | | Non-album singles |
"—" denotes a recording that did not chart or was not released in that territory.

== Other certified songs ==
List of songs, with selected certifications and album name
| Title | Year | Certifications | Album |
|---|---|---|---|
| "Disorder" | 1979 | BPI: Silver; RMNZ: Gold | Unknown Pleasures |

== Video albums ==
List of video albums, showing details and certifications
| Title | Details | Certifications |
|---|---|---|
| Here Are the Young Men | Released: August 1982; Label: Factory; Format: VHS | |
| Their Own Story in Their Own Words | Released: 2007; Label: Universal; Format: DVD | BPI: Gold |

== Other appearances ==
List of other appearances, with year released, album name and comments
| Song(s) | Year | Album | Comments |
|---|---|---|---|
| "At a Later Date" | 1978 | Short Circuit: Live at the Electric Circus | Live version from an Electric Circus, Manchester concert in 1977. |
| "Digital" | 1978 | A Factory Sample | Later released on Substance. |
| "Glass" | 1978 | A Factory Sample | Later released on Substance. |
| "Auto-Suggestion" | 1979 | Earcom 2: Contradiction | Later released on Substance. |
| "From Safety to Where...?" | 1979 | Earcom 2: Contradiction | Later released on Substance. |
| "Shadowplay" | 2017 | Silhouettes and Statues: A Gothic Revolution 1978–1986 | |

== See also ==
- List of songs recorded by Joy Division
