= The Best of Joy Division =

Greatest hits album by Joy Division
- Released: 24 March 2008
- Recorded: 1978–1980
- Length: 55:13
- Label: London (UK); Rhino (U.S.)
- Producer: Martin Hannett

Joy Division compilations chronology
Martin Hannett's Personal Mixes (2007)	The Best of Joy Division (2008)	Total: From Joy Division to New Order (2011)

Professional ratings
Review scores
Source	Rating
AllMusic	4/5 stars
musicOMH	4/5 stars
Pitchfork	6.0/10
PopMatters	5/10 stars

The Best of Joy Division is a compilation album of material from the British post-punk band Joy Division. It was released 24 March 2008 and the UK version includes The Complete BBC Recordings as a bonus disc. The US release is a single disc. The Best of Joy Division reached #97 in April 2008 in Australia; this marks the band's second appearance on the ARIA Charts, after Substance reached #53 in 1988.

== Track listing ==
All tracks are written by Joy Division.

No.	Title	Original release	Length
1.	"Digital"	A Factory Sample (1979)	2:51
2.	"Disorder"	Unknown Pleasures (1979)	3:27
3.	"Shadowplay"	Unknown Pleasures	3:50
4.	"New Dawn Fades"	Unknown Pleasures	4:44
5.	"Transmission"	"Transmission" (1979)	3:36
6.	"Atmosphere"	"Atmosphere" (1980)	4:10
7.	"Dead Souls"	"Licht und Blindheit" (1980)	4:56
8.	"She's Lost Control" (12" single version)	"She's Lost Control" (1980)	4:46
9.	"Love Will Tear Us Apart"	"Love Will Tear Us Apart" (1980)	3:27
10.	"These Days"	"Love Will Tear Us Apart"	3:25
11.	"Twenty Four Hours"	Closer (1980)	4:26
12.	"Heart and Soul"	Closer	5:51
13.	"Incubation"	"Komakino" (1980)	2:52
14.	"Isolation"	Closer	2:53

Bonus CD – The Complete BBC Recordings

1. "Exercise One" (Peel Session) – 2:32
2. "Insight" (Peel Session) – 3:53
3. "She's Lost Control" (Peel Session) – 4:11
4. "Transmission" (Peel Session) – 3:58
5. "Love Will Tear Us Apart" (Peel Session) – 3:25
6. "Twenty Four Hours" (Peel Session) – 4:10
7. "Colony" (Peel Session) – 4:05
8. "Sound of Music" (Peel Session) – 4:27
9. "Transmission" (live) – 3:18
10. "She's Lost Control" (live) – 3:44
11. "Ian Curtis & Stephen Morris interviewed by Richard Skinner" – 3:32

Notes

- Tracks 1 to 4 first released on The Peel Sessions EP in 1986.
- Tracks 5 to 8 first released on The Peel Sessions EP in 1987.
- Tracks 9 to 11 first released on the Joy Division The Complete BBC Recordings album in 2000.

== Charts ==
Chart (2008)	Peak position
Australian Albums (ARIA)	97

== Certifications ==
Region	Certification	Certified units/sales
United Kingdom (BPI)	Gold	100,000^{^}
^{^} Shipments figures based on certification alone.
