= Fast Product =

Independent record label

Fast Product was an independent record label established in Edinburgh by Bob Last, his partner, Hilary Morrison and Tim Pearce in December 1977. Its first release was the first single by the Mekons, on 20 January 1978.

== History ==
The label issued the first records by a number of early and influential post-punk bands from Northern England, including the original Human League, Gang of Four and the Mekons. Fast Product also released the first singles by the Scottish punk bands Scars and The Flowers. The label also released compilations of various new bands called 'ear comics' or Earcom. Many of the label's releases were also produced by Bob Last with Morrison producing photographs and visuals for the record sleeves.

Fast Product's releases challenged pop music conventions (hence the label's early monikers: "difficult fun" and "mutant pop"), and through its releases and marketing invoked a DIY punk spirit and generally socialist political outlook. Often packaging records with a caustic yet subtle sideswipe at consumerism (for example, the image of a wall of gold discs on the cover of the Mekons' second single), Fast Product attempted to show that all aspects of the record business, from musicianship to design to distribution, could be taken out of the hands of the major labels.

Lloyd Cole also name-checked Fast Product in his song Women's Studies, from the 2013 album Standards.

Later, the pair also established the Pop Aural label, releasing singles by such acts as The Flowers, Boots For Dancing and The Fire Engines.

The label was profiled in depth in the 2015 documentary film Big Gold Dream.

The story of Fast Product was extensively covered in the 2022 book Hungry Beat written by Douglas MacIntyre and Grant McPhee with Neil Cooper, published by White Rabbit Books

Bob Last has joked that Factory Records is "Fast 13" - the label's final release - saying "I just never told them they had a catalogue number."

== Discography ==
The source for the information below is the website vinylnet.co.uk.

=== Singles ===
- FAST 1 The Mekons - "Never Been In A Riot" / "32 Weeks" / "Heart & Soul" 7-inch (1978)
- FAST 2 2.3 - "Where To Now?" / "All Time Low" 7-inch (1978)
- FAST 4 The Human League - "Being Boiled" / "Circus Of Death" 7-inch (June 1978)
- FAST 5 Gang of Four - "Damaged Goods" / "Love Like Anthrax" / "Armalite Rifle" 7-inch (December 1978)
- FAST 7 The Mekons - "Where Were You?" / "I'll Have To Dance Then (On My Own)" 7-inch (November 1978)
- FAST 8 Scars - "Adult/ery" / "Horrorshow" 7-inch (1979)
- FAST 9a Earcom One (The Prats, The Flowers, Blank Students, Graph, Simon Bloomfield and Tim Pearce) 12-inch
- FAST 9b Earcom Two (Joy Division, Thursdays & Basczax) 12-inch
- FAST 9c Earcom Three (DAF, Noh Mercy, Middle Class, Stupid Babies, From Chorley) double 7-inch (1979)
- FAST 10 The Human League - "The Dignity of Labour" 12-inch (some with flexi-disc) (1979)
- FAST 12 Dead Kennedys - "California über alles" / "Man with the Dogs" 7-inch

=== Albums ===
- FAST 11 The First Year Plan - Compilation of single releases, licensed to EMI, so also has catalogue number EMC 3312)
- Mutant Pop - US reissue of early Fast Product and Pop Aural singles by the Mekons, the Gang of Four, the Human League, The Flowers, 2.3 and Scars (PVC/JEM Records 1980)

=== Miscellaneous ===
- FAST 3 Fast Product The Quality Of Life No.1 (zine issued March 1978)
- FAST 6 Fast Product The Quality Of Life No.2 (zine issued April 1979)
- Virgin VS300 The Mekons - "Work All Week" / "Unknown Wrecks" 7-inch (1979) - FAST Logo on label, 'Produced for Fast Product' credit
- Fast Product America FPA 002 Fire Engines - "Aufgeladen Und Bereit Fur Action Und Spass" LP (1981)

== Pop:Aural Discography ==
The source for the information below is the website discogs.com

=== Singles ===
- POP001 The Flowers - "Confessions" / "(Life) After Dark" 7-inch (1979)
- POP002 Boots For Dancing - "Boots For Dancing" 12-inch (1980)
- POP003 The Flowers - "Ballad Of Miss Demeanour" 7-inch (1980)
- POP004 Drinking Electricity - "Shaking All Over" / "China" 7-inch (1980)
- POP005 Drinking Electricity - "Shake Some Action" 7-inch (1980)
- POP006 Boots For Dancing - "The Rain Song" / "Hesitate" 7-inch (1980)
- POP007 Restricted Code - "First Night On" / "From The Top" 7-inch (1980)
- POP008 Drinking Electricity - "Cruising Missiles" / "Shaking All Over (dub) 7-inch (1980)
- POP009 Restricted Code - "Love To Meet You" 7-inch (1980)
- POP010 Fire Engines - "CandySkin" / "Meat Whiplash" 7-inch (1981)
- POP011 Marching Girls - "1" 7-inch (1981)
- POP012 Jo Callis / S.H.A.K.E. Project- "Woah Yeah!" 7-inch EP (1981)
- POP013 Fire Engines - "Big Gold Dream" 7-inch (1981)

=== Albums (on the Accessory label) ===
- ACC001 Fire Engines - "Lubricate Your Livingroom" LP (1981)
- ACC002 Frank Hannaway and Michael Barclay - "At Home" Mini LP (1981)

== See also ==
- List of independent UK record labels
