= The Complete BBC Recordings (Joy Division album) =

Joy Division The Complete BBC Recordings

Compilation album by Joy Division
- Released: October 2000
- Recorded: January–November 1979
- Genre: Post-punk
- Label: Strange Fruit
- Producer: Bob Sargeant, Tony Wilson

Joy Division chronology
Preston 28 February 1980 (1999)	Joy Division The Complete BBC Recordings (2000)	Les Bains Douches 18 December 1979 (2001)

Professional ratings
Review scores
Source	Rating
AllMusic	4/5 stars
Select	5/5 stars

Joy Division The Complete BBC Recordings is a collection of the two Peel Sessions recorded by Joy Division, two songs from the BBC Television programme Something Else and a live interview. It was released in 2000. The album was re-released as "Before and After – The BBC Sessions" in 2004, the Joy Division tracks included were the same, but it also contained a New Order album. The entire track listing of the album was later released as the second disc in the UK edition of The Best of Joy Division in 2008.

== Reception ==
Select gave the album a five out of five rating. Select praised songs that were not included into Joy Division's studio albums such as "Exercise One" and "Sound of Music", referring to them as "about as profound as pop music can be".

== Track listing ==
All tracks written by Joy Division.

LP (SFRSLP094) and CD (SFRSCD094)

1. "Exercise One" – 2:32
2. "Insight" – 3:53
3. "She's Lost Control" – 4:11
4. "Transmission" – 3:58
5. "Love Will Tear Us Apart" – 3:25
6. "Twenty Four Hours" – 4:10
7. "Colony" – 4:05
8. "Sound of Music" – 4:27
9. "Transmission" – 3:18
10. "She's Lost Control" – 3:44
11. "Ian Curtis & Stephen Morris interviewed by Richard Skinner" – 3:32

== Notes ==
- Tracks 1 to 4 recorded 31 January 1979 at the BBC Studios, Maida Vale, London; first released on The Peel Sessions EP in 1986.
- Tracks 5 to 8 recorded 26 November 1979 at the BBC Studios, Maida Vale, London; first released on The Peel Sessions EP in 1987.
- Tracks 9 to 10 recorded live for Something Else 1 September 1979; previously unreleased.
- Track 11 recorded for Radio One in 1979; previously unreleased.
