= Dead Souls (song) =

Song by Joy Division

Single by Joy Division
- A-side: "Atmosphere"
- B-side: "Dead Souls"
- Released: 1980
- Recorded: 1979
- Genre: Post-punk; gothic rock
- Length: 4:53
- Label: Sordide Sentimental
- Songwriters: Bernard Sumner; Peter Hook; Stephen Morris; Ian Curtis
- Producer: Martin Hannett

Joy Division singles chronology
"Transmission" (1980)	"Dead Souls" (1980)	"Komakino" (1980)

"Dead Souls" is a song by the English post-punk band Joy Division. Co-written by band members Ian Curtis (vocals and lyrics), Peter Hook (bass guitar), Bernard Sumner (lead guitar) and Stephen Morris (drums). Centred on a circular bassline by Hook that had a significant influence on 1980s gothic rock, the song was named by Curtis after Nikolai Gogol's 1842 novel Dead Souls. The song contains a lengthy intro designed as the opening for live gigs. The track was recorded in late 1979 during the same sessions as "Atmosphere".

After lead singer Ian Curtis's suicide and Joy Division's disbandment, "Dead Souls" appeared on compilations such as 1981's Still. It has become one of the band's most critically-acclaimed songs, with many music writers ranking it among the band's greatest work. The industrial rock band Nine Inch Nails covered the song for the 1994 film The Crow and have since performed the song intermittently live.

== Background and recording ==
"Dead Souls" was named after the 1842 Nikolai Gogol novel of the same name. The song's lengthy instrumental intro was used to provide lead singer Ian Curtis an opportunity to size up the band's live audiences with his characteristic dancing. Bassist Peter Hook recalled, "He'd never danced in rehearsals. He just started doing it when we were playing. We used to do a long build-up in 'Dead Souls' because he felt it was a great way of sizing up the audience and building up tension. He was onstage from the start, doing the dance, freaking people out".

"Dead Souls" was recorded during a three-day session in October 1979 with producer Martin Hannett, which also produced "Atmosphere" and a version of one of the band's early songs, "Ice Age". Unlike on other recordings with Hannett, the band recorded the tracks for these songs while all in the same room, as opposed to earlier sessions where drummer Stephen Morris was instructed to play one drum at a time.

Morris contended that "Dead Souls" and "Atmosphere" were "the most accomplished and sophisticated" recordings the band had completed to that point. Meanwhile, guitarist Bernard Sumner commented that he "loved" the feel of the song.

== Release ==
"Dead Souls" was originally released in March 1980 by the label Sordide Sentimental as a France-only 7" single under the title "Licht und Blindheit" (German for "Light and Blindness"). It was limited to 1578 copies and featured "Atmosphere" as the A-side and "Dead Souls" as the B-side. John Peel played "Atmosphere" for the first time on his show on 11 March 1980 and "Dead Souls" the following night. Neither song appeared on a studio album or on a UK single prior to Curtis' death. Bassist Peter Hook reflected, "In a way, that was part of the lightness of Joy Division, was that we weren't precious about the music—we were giving tracks away. ... We gave 'Dead Souls' away. It was like, 'Yeah? Really?' 'Don't worry about it we'll just write another one.'"

Following the death of lead singer Ian Curtis in May 1980, "Atmosphere" was released as a 12" single, but "Dead Souls" was replaced with "She's Lost Control" as the B-side. "Dead Souls" would ultimately see wider release on the band's posthumous 1981 compilation album Still, as well as on future compilations like 1988's Substance and 1997's Heart and Soul. "Dead Souls" also appears on the soundtrack for the Ian Curtis biopic Control.

== Critical reception ==
Many music writers have since recognised "Dead Souls" as among Joy Division's best songs. Stereogum ranked it as the greatest Joy Division song, writing, "Given the band had already established an inclination for creating songs both fragile and strangely powerful in their despondency, 'Dead Souls' remains a singular track even now, with Curtis imploring his unnamed audience with the opening line, 'Someone take these dreams away,' with a chilling authenticity." The Guardian also included it in their top ten list of Joy Division songs, writing, "This is Curtis's musical seance with the spirits of yore, a dreadful, hypnotic spell that freezes your limbs and can't be shaken off."

Dig! concurred, ranking it as the band's eighth greatest song and commenting, "With hindsight, it seems almost perverse that Joy Division originally released it on the limited-edition, French-only Licht und Blindheit EP, though Factory later confirmed Dead Souls' status as one of the best Joy Division songs when they reclaimed it for Still."

== Track listings ==
Both songs were written and composed by Joy Division (Ian Curtis, Peter Hook, Stephen Morris and Bernard Sumner).

"Licht und Blindheit" (7")

Side A
No.	Title	Length
1.	"Atmosphere"	4:10

Side B
No.	Title	Length
1.	"Dead Souls"	4:53

== Nine Inch Nails version ==
"Dead Souls"

Song by Nine Inch Nails

from the album The Crow: Original Motion Picture Soundtrack
- Released: 1994
- Recorded: 1994
- Studio: Le Pig; Los Angeles
- Genre: Industrial rock; gothic rock
- Length: 4:52
- Label: Atlantic
- Producer: Trent Reznor

Industrial rock band Nine Inch Nails covered "Dead Souls" for The Crow in 1994. This version would appear on the film's soundtrack, The Crow: Original Motion Picture Soundtrack. According to Joy Division's Peter Hook, the band's successor band New Order was originally asked to contribute a version of "Love Will Tear Us Apart" to the film's soundtrack as an homage to Joy Division. When this did not manifest, however, New Order gave their approval for Nine Inch Nails to cover "Dead Souls" for the film. Nine Inch Nails' version was the first song the band recorded at the Sharon Tate home, where the band would go on to work on their 1994 album The Downward Spiral.

The band's cover became a cult favorite and the song would appear intermittently in the band's live setlist, including in a medley with "Help Me I Am in Hell" during the band's performance at Woodstock '94.

Hook was complimentary of the cover, stating, "I like the band a lot, but they did the song very faithfully. It's a real complimentary interpretation of 'Dead Souls.' A lot of the time when I hear it, I think it's us. That's a great compliment from Trent [Reznor]."
