= Substance (Joy Division album) =

Compilation album by Joy Division
- Released: 11 July 1988
- Recorded: December 1977 – March 1980
- Genre: Post-punk; punk rock; gothic rock
- Length: 37:52 (LP); 62:29 (CD)
- Label: Factory
- Producer: Martin Hannett; Joy Division

Joy Division compilations chronology
Still (1981)	Substance (1988)	The Peel Sessions (1990)

Alternative cover
- CD cover art

Singles from Substance
- 1. "Atmosphere" Released: 6 June 1988

Professional ratings
Review scores
Source	Rating
AllMusic	5/5 stars
Robert Christgau	B+
Uncut	8/10

Substance is a singles compilation album by the English rock band Joy Division. It was released on 11 July 1988 by Factory Records. It is the companion to a similar singles compilation by their subsequent band New Order, also titled Substance. It peaked at number 7 on the UK Albums Chart and 146 on the Billboard 200, the band's only chart appearance in the United States. It also reached number 15 in New Zealand and number 53 in Australia in August 1988.

== Content ==
Substance compiles the four singles released by the band that did not appear on albums — "Transmission", "Komakino", "Love Will Tear Us Apart", and "Atmosphere" — as well as most of their B-sides. It also collects tracks released on various EPs, namely the band's first release, An Ideal for Living, and two samplers issued by Factory Records, A Factory Sample and Earcom 2: Contradiction.

Two of the album's tracks, "Glass" and "Dead Souls", were previously included on the 1981 compilation Still. Additionally, the single "Atmosphere" had been originally issued in France as "Licht und Blindheit" with "Dead Souls" on the B-side; following Ian Curtis's suicide, it was reissued as a posthumous B-side of the "She's Lost Control" 12-inch single. The vinyl version omits the single "Komakino" and does not include the complete titles from the EPs, due to the lower storage capacity of a vinyl record.

Later CD pressings issued by London Records contain a previously unreleased mix of "She's Lost Control" that is slightly different from the original single release. More guitar is mixed within the song, the synthesiser melody is shortened and starts at a later point, and the ending of the song is extended by 15 seconds and does not fade out.

Substance was digitally remastered in 2015, containing not only the alternative mix of "She's Lost Control", but also two additional tracks: "As You Said" (the second B-side of "Komakino") and the initial take of "Love Will Tear Us Apart" (originally released on the B-side of the original single), dubbed the "Pennine Version" after the studio it was recorded at.

== Cover ==
The cover features the title of the album in green spelled with characters from Wim Crouwel's New Alphabet typeface below Joy Division's name and the years of recording in a smaller white typeface. The letters used in the title actually spell "Subst1mce", rather than "Substance". Brett Wickens, who worked on this cover whilst a partner at Saville Associates, claims this was for aesthetic reasons.

== Track listing ==
=== LP (Factory FACT 250) ===
All tracks are written by Joy Division.

Side one
No.	Title	Original release	Length
1.	"Warsaw"	An Ideal for Living	2:25
2.	"Leaders of Men"	An Ideal for Living	2:35
3.	"Digital"	A Factory Sample	2:50
4.	"Autosuggestion"	Earcom 2: Contradiction	6:08
5.	"Transmission"	"Transmission" (FAC 13)	3:36

Side two
No.	Title	Original release	Length
1.	"She's Lost Control"	"Atmosphere" (FACUS 2)	4:45 (4:59 on later pressings)
2.	"Incubation"	"Komakino" (FAC 28)	2:52
3.	"Dead Souls"	Licht und Blindheit	4:56
4.	"Atmosphere"	"Atmosphere" (FACUS 2)	4:10
5.	"Love Will Tear Us Apart"	"Love Will Tear Us Apart" (FAC 23)	3:25

=== CD (Factory FACD 250) and cassette (Factory FACT 250C) ===
Same tracks as LP plus the following bonus tracks, titled Appendix:

No.	Title	Original release	Length
11.	"No Love Lost"	An Ideal for Living	3:43
12.	"Failures"	An Ideal for Living	3:44
13.	"Glass"	A Factory Sample	3:53
14.	"From Safety to Where...?"	Earcom 2: Contradiction	2:27
15.	"Novelty"	"Transmission" (FAC 13)	4:00
16.	"Komakino"	"Komakino" (FAC 28)	3:52
17.	"These Days"	"Love Will Tear Us Apart" (FAC 23)	3:24

=== 2015 remastered edition bonus tracks ===
No.	Title	Original release	Length
17.	"As You Said"	"Komakino" (FAC 28)	2:00
18.	"These Days"	"Love Will Tear Us Apart" (FAC 23)	3:24
19.	"Love Will Tear Us Apart" (Pennine version)	"Love Will Tear Us Apart" (FAC 23)	3:15

== Personnel ==
- Ian Curtis – vocals
- Bernard Sumner – guitar, synthesiser, organ on "Atmosphere"
- Peter Hook – bass
- Stephen Morris – drums

== Certifications ==
Region	Certification	Certified units/sales
United Kingdom (BPI)	Gold	100,000^{^}
^{^} Shipments figures based on certification alone.
