= The Flowers (Scottish band) =

Scottish post-punk band

- Origin: Scotland
- Genres: Post-punk
- Years active: 1978–1980
- Past members: Hl-Ray (Hilary Morrison); Andy Copland; Fraser Sutherland; Simon Best; Russell Burn; Dave Carson

The Flowers (sometimes credited as Flowers), active from 1978–1980, were a post-punk band from Scotland, part of the Edinburgh scene which spawned bands such as Scars, Josef K and The Fire Engines. They are known for their feminist lyrics and "astringent" music. The band, and the musical scene of which they were a part, are profiled in the 2015 film Big Gold Dream.

== Biography ==
The Flowers formed in 1978, when local band The Dirty Reds split into two offshoot bands, The Dirty Reds Two and the group which would become The Flowers. This latter group included Dave Carson (later of Boots for Dancing) on bass, Andy Copland on guitar, and drummer Russell Burn (later of The Fire Engines and Win). Carson invited Hilary Morrison to join as vocalist.

Morrison was also the co-founder of two influential independent record labels, Fast Product and Pop:Aural, with then-partner Bob Last. The Flowers' music would be released on both of these labels.

Within a year, founding members Carson and Burn had left. By the time of their first recording in 1979, the band had settled into the following lineup:

- Hilary Morrison (credited as “HL Ray”) – vocals
- Andy Copland – guitar
- Fraser Sutherland – bass
- Simon Best – drums

The band played regularly throughout the UK, often opening for Human League and The Mekons, and also touring with The Beat and OMD. The Flowers played the 1980 Futurama Festival in Leeds, which was headlined by Siouxsie and the Banshees and Gary Glitter.

=== Post-Breakup ===
Hilary Morrison went on to sing with several other bands in the Edinburgh post-punk scene, including Fire Engines and Restricted Code. In 1981, after the breakup of Fire Engines, she and Davy Henderson formed Heartbeats, whose song "Spook Sex" was included on the NME compilation Racket Packet in 1983. Later, Morrison worked in theatre, and eventually became a community educator working with charities.

== Recordings ==
The Flowers never released a full-length album, but between 1979 and 1980, eleven songs were recorded (including two different versions of two songs, “After Dark” and “Tear Along”), seven of which saw a formal release.

The band made their recorded debut in May 1979, when their songs “Criminal Waste” and “After Dark” were included on the first Earcom compilation, Earcom 1, on Fast Product. John Peel played "Criminal Waste" on his 24 May show, and a member of the band called in to point out that what was apparently "surface noise" on the recording was actually an overdub of rain. "After Dark" has been described as a "revelatory" song which "dissect[s] the rituals of the disco" from a female perspective.

On 28 August 1979, The Flowers recorded a session for John Peel's show on BBC Radio 1. Their four tracks were “Living Doll,” “Tunnels,” “The Deep End Dance,” and “Tear Along”. This session was broadcast on 12 September 1979. Although it never saw a physical release, the broadcast can be readily found online.

In December 1980, their single Confessions / (Life) After Dark was released on Pop:Aural. “(Life) After Dark” is a different version of “After Dark,” which had previously appeared on the first Earcom compilation. These tracks were later included on Mutant Pop 78/79, a compilation of Fast Product and Pop:Aural songs released in North America. Other bands on this compilation included The Human League, Gang of Four, Scars, and The Mekons.

Their second release on Pop:Aural, the Ballad of Miss Demeanour EP, was recorded in 1979 and 1980 and released on May 23, 1980. It consisted of three songs: “Ballad of Miss Demeanour,” “Food,” and “Tear Along.” This would be the band’s final release.

None of the group’s full releases has been officially reissued on CD or in any digital format, although several of their songs have been included in compilations: "Confessions" appears on the Big Gold Dreams documentary tie-in CD box set, from Cherry Red Records; "After Dark" was included on the limited-run A Reference of Female-Fronted Punk Rock: 1977–89 CD set; and "Ballad of Miss Demeanour" was included on Cherry Red Records' Make More Noise! Women In Independent Music UK 1977-1987 compilation.

== Discography ==
The below discography includes all releases issued during the life of the band. It does not include reissues of the group's songs on later compilations.

Date of Release	Title	Label
7"
Dec. 1979	Confessions / Life After Dark: Confessions, (Life) After Dark	Pop:Aural
1980	Ballad of Miss Demeanour (EP): Ballad of Miss Demeanour, Food, Tear Along	Pop:Aural
Compilations
1979	Earcom 1: After Dark, Criminal Waste	Fast Product
1980	Mutant Pop 78/79: After Dark, Confessions	Fast Product
