= Warsaw (song) =

Song by Joy Division

from the EP An Ideal for Living
- Released: 3 June 1978
- Recorded: 14 December 1977
- Studio: Pennine Sound
- Genre: Punk rock
- Length: 2:25
- Label: Enigma; Anonymous
- Songwriters: Bernard Sumner; Peter Hook; Stephen Morris; Ian Curtis
- Producer: Joy Division

"Warsaw" is the opening song on the EP An Ideal for Living, written and performed by the British band Joy Division. It was slated for release on the planned debut album which was scrapped, although bootlegged under the name Warsaw. The song references Rudolf Hess, Hitler's Deputy Führer, who flew to Great Britain in 1941 in an attempt to negotiate a peace between Germany and the UK.

== Composition ==
The song starts with the mock-countoff "3 5 0 1 2 5 Go!"; "31G-350125" was Hess's prisoner of war serial number when he was captured after flying to Eaglesham, Scotland during World War II. The chorus is a simple repetition of "31G", the first three characters of his serial number with "31" signifying the European theatre of war and "G" German, the nationality of the prisoner.

== Other versions ==
The song is available on a number of compilations, including Substance. At a performance of the song "At a Later Date" at the Electric Circus in Manchester, Guitarist Bernard Sumner shouts "You all forgot Rudolf Hess" before the song begins.

"Warsaw" is featured in the video game Tony Hawk's Underground 2.

The band Seaweed covered the song on their 1999 album Actions and Indications.
