= Preston 28 February 1980 =

Live album by Joy Division
- Released: May 1999
- Recorded: 28 February 1980 at The Warehouse, Preston, Lancashire, England
- Genre: Post-punk
- Length: 49:22
- Label: NMC Music
- Producer: Beccy Ryan

Joy Division chronology
Heart and Soul (1997)	Preston 28 February 1980 (1999)	The Complete BBC Recordings (2000)

Preston 28 February 1980 is a live album by English post-punk band Joy Division featuring a performance on 28 February 1980 at The Warehouse, Preston. The album was released on 24 May 1999 in the UK by record label NMC Music and in the US on 13 July 1999.

== Content ==
The image on the cover is a scrambled photo of the venue.

== Release ==
Preston 28 February 1980 was released on 24 May 1999 in the UK by record label NMC Music and 13 July 1999 in the US. It was also released in a "boxed set", packaged with the Les Bains Douches album.

== Reception ==
Professional ratings
Review scores
Source	Rating
AllMusic	4/5 stars

CMJ Music Monthly called it "an exceptionally intense gig that goes much further toward demonstrating the importance of the short-lived band". Pitchfork described the recording as "bafflingly low-quality"; further, the gig has supposedly been described by members of the band as "the worst fucking show we ever did".

== Track listing ==
All tracks are written by Joy Division (Ian Curtis, Peter Hook, Stephen Morris and Bernard Sumner).

No.	Title	Length
1.	"Incubation"	3:06
2.	"Wilderness"	3:02
3.	"Twenty Four Hours"	4:39
4.	"The Eternal"	8:39
5.	"Heart and Soul"	4:46
6.	"Shadowplay"	3:50
7.	"Transmission"	3:23
8.	"Disorder"	3:23
9.	"Warsaw"	2:48
10.	"Colony"	4:16
11.	"Interzone"	2:28
12.	"She's Lost Control"	5:02
