= Michael Barclay =

Michael Barclay may refer to:

- Michael Barclay de Tolly (1761–1818), German-Russian military commander
- Michael Barclay, character in Adventure in Diamonds
- Mike Barclay, musician in Boots for Dancing

== See also ==
- Michael Berkeley (born 1948), English composer
