= The Flaming Mussolinis =

- Origin: Teesside, England
- Genres: Alternative rock, indie rock, pop rock
- Years active: 1984–1988
- Labels: Portrait, Epic
- Past members: Alan Savage; Kit Haigh; Jeff Fogarty; Doug Maloney; Craig McClune

The Flaming Mussolinis were a 1980s pop/rock band from Teesside who released two albums, and had a minor UK hit with "My Cleopatra".

== History ==
The band formed in 1984 in Middlesbrough, United Kingdom, although various members had been in local Teesside (North-east England) bands since the late 1970s. The most notable of these bands was Basczax. They signed to CBS in-house label Portrait Records in 1985 and were tipped for big things. The band released five singles: "Swallow Glass", "My Cleopatra" (a minor UK hit at #79), "Masuka Dan", "Girl on a Train" and "Different Kind of Love". They also released two albums: Watching the Film (1986) and Charmed Life (1987). The band's song "Angels Fall Down" was a finalist in the World Popular Song Festival in 1986.

Critical coverage was mixed. Billboard touted them in 1986 as "a band with something new to say", and Fanfare described Watching the Film as "good noise of the post-'87 boomlet: laid back, languid, and cleaner than most",

The band split up in 1988. Alan Savage later became a school teacher, while McClune found commercial success as a member of David Gray’s backing band.

== Members ==
- Alan Savage - vocals/guitar
- Kit Haigh - guitar
- Jeff Fogarty - saxophone and keyboards
- Doug Maloney - bass guitar, keyboard programming, backing vocals
- Craig McClune - drums

== Discography ==
=== Albums ===
- Watching the Film (1986), Portrait
- Charmed Life (1987), Epic

=== Singles ===
- "Swallow Glass" (1985), Portrait
- "My Cleopatra" (1985), Portrait - UK No. 79
- "Masuka Dan" (1986), Portrait
- "Different Kind of Love" (1987), Epic
- "Girl on a Train" (1987), Epic
