= The Warehouse (Preston, Lancashire) =

Nightclub and music venue in England

- Location in Preston city centre
- Former names: Raiders
- Location: Preston, Lancashire, England
- Coordinates: 53.7584°N 2.6953°W
- Capacity: 650
- Type: Night club
- Events: Heavy metal, hard rock, indie rock, alternative, pop

Construction
- Opened: 1972

Website
- www.warehousenightclub.co.uk

The Warehouse is an alternative nightclub and music venue in Preston, Lancashire, England. It opened in 1972 and has also been known as Raiders.

== History ==
It was originally named The Warehouse, then Raiders, and then back to The Warehouse in 1988 when the current owners took over. Joy Division recorded their live album Preston Warehouse there 12 weeks before Ian Curtis' death.

Popularity of the club led to expansion; with the middle floor opening in 1990 and a third floor in 1993 bringing the capacity to its current approximate of around 650.

== Music ==
Today The Warehouse now serves as an alternative Nightclub compromising of three different ‘Levels’ with one on each storey. The music played differs on each night it is open. On the top (third) floor the DJs only play less mainstream music genres, such as Heavy metal, pop punk, hard rock and emo mixed with ‘Warey Anthems’. On the second floor the music played is more mainstream than the level below which is described as ‘Dance and Urban’. It is this floor that is most similar to a conventional nightclub and therefore does not attract any particular social group, but appeals to a wide audience of people who regularly go nightclubbing. On the ground floor, specifically indie music is played including pop acts such as Sam Fender and Blur.
