= Actions and Indications =

Studio album by Seaweed
- Released: 1999
- Genre: Punk rock
- Label: Merge

Seaweed chronology
Spanaway (1995)	Actions and Indications (1999)

Actions and Indications is the final album by the American punk rock band Seaweed, released in 1999. It was the band's first album in four years, a period in which they also took a break from performing. Seaweed broke up shortly after putting out the album.

The album was reissued in 2015.

== Production ==
Actions and Indications was recorded at the band's home studio. Alan Cage, of Quicksand, played drums on the album. "Warsaw" is a cover of the Joy Division song.

== Critical reception ==
Professional ratings
Review scores
Source	Rating
AllMusic	2/5 stars
Exclaim!	7/10
Melody Maker	3.5/5 stars

The Stranger determined that "the power that shifts and surges underneath what seem at first to be gentle melodies makes Actions and Indications a handy cure for pop/punk-induced malaise." The Dallas Morning News called the album "prime stuff: crunchy, invigorating and ever so lively."

The Fort Worth Star-Telegram wrote: "You could say [Seaweed's] latest effort and debut for well-respected indie Merge is more of the same punk/slightly metal stuff that so many others do, but what a sad way to characterize a band that not only helped etch Seattle's music scene but also is still a pertinent part." The Houston Press thought that "the urgency and anger come across in the crisp tempo, but by keeping the guitars in perfect time and not letting them get sloppy, the members seem like wounded veterans, not like whiny punks bitching about 'the man'."

AllMusic deemed the album "all proper punk roots with too much guitar and fearsome early-'80s vocalizing."

== Track listing ==
1. "Antilyrical" - 2:42
2. "Thru the Window" - 3:05
3. "Hard Times" - 3:38
4. "Steadfast Shrine" - 1:56
5. "Red Tape Parade" - 2:19
6. "What Are We Taking?" - 3:51
7. "Warsaw" - 2:08
8. "Against the Sky" - 4:03
9. "In the Middle" - 3:10
10. "Let Go" - 3:08
11. "Stay Down" - 4:02
