= Scott MacLeay =

Canadian photographer (1950)

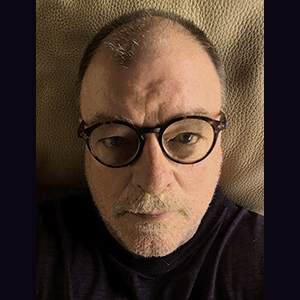
- Scott MacLeay
- Born: March 25, 1950 (age 76); Thunder Bay, Ontario, Canada
- Known for: Photographer, musical composer and new media artist
- Spouse: Barreto Costa MacLeay
- Website: www.scottmacleay.com

Scott MacLeay (born March 25, 1950) is a Canadian photographer, composer and new media artist. His images, like his music, often deal with juxtapositions of fragmented elements in multilayered environments. He began his career in Vancouver, British Columbia, Canada, in the later 1970s, moving to Paris in 1979. In 2010 he moved to Florianópolis, Brazil.

== Education ==
Scott MacLeay earned an Honours B.A. degree with a major in economics from Queen's University, Kingston, Ontario in 1972 and a Master of Science degree in economic theory specializing in development economics from the London School of Economics and Political Science in 1974. He left his doctoral studies at the University of British Columbia in Vancouver, British Columbia, Canada, in 1975 to pursue a career in photography.

== Work ==
He gained notoriety in the early 1980s for his color series Attitudes incorporating detail-free, graphic figures in flat two-dimensional fields, first exhibited in 1980 at the Space Gallery of Pete Turner, Ernst Haas, Jay Maisel in New York. In 1981 he began collaborating with the Fresson family for the printing of his work. The luminosity of the pigment-based, Fresson charcoal process was ideally suited to the texture-free, color palette he was exploring. In 1982 his work was included in the Life Library of Photography in the volume dedicated to the Art of Photography.

His work has been exhibited widely in Europe, N. and S. America and Japan and was represented by the Galérie Ufficio dell'Arte / Créatis in Paris and the Marcuse Pfeifer Gallery in New York where he exhibited both quadrichrome and dichromatic work during the 1980s. He participated in both solo and group exhibitions for the Biennale Mois de la Photo de la Ville de Paris in 1980, 1982 and 1988. His photographs are in included in private and museum collections worldwide.

In 1980, he founded the Photography Department at the American Center for Artists in Paris becoming Director of its Center for Media Art and Photography in 1985 following in the footsteps of founder Don Foresta and Anne-Marie Stein.

In 1982 he began composing experimental music for contemporary dance for American and French choreographers including Robert Kovich, Ruth Barnes, Marc Vincent and Jean-Marc Matos in collaboration with French choreographer François Raffinot. Musical composition became his principal activity by the end of the 1980s and in 1988, he formed Private Circus with vocalist Christel Desjardin, an informally structured musical research group, that made two CDs on the French independent label Sordide Sentimental: the contemporary cabaret opera Les Petities Foules / Small Crowds (SSCD004, 1990) and a compilation of music created for contemporary dance La Moitié de L'Histoire (SSFP99, 1994).

In 2010 he settled in Florianópolis, Brazil where in addition to returning to photography and new media work, he also curates exhibitions of young Brazilian new media artists and writes on conceptual approaches to photography. He has directed workshops / portfolio critiques at various events such as Floripa na Foto (2011 and 2013) and the Festival de Fotografia de Tiradentes (2013/2015/2018/2019/2020) as well as at institutions such as the SESC Santana and SESC 24 de Maio, São Paulo (2014/2017/2018). His book of essays on photography Pensar, Sentir, Ver: Percepção e Processo em Fotografia (Thinking, Feeling, Seeing: Perception and process in Photography) was published in 2015.

Since 2017, Macleay's work has been increasingly dedicated to exploring interactive, non-linear storytelling, employing photography, video and audio. The first phase of his transmedia project Encounters in the Right and Left Hemispheres was completed in December 2019: an interactive book of the same named published in February 2020. The second phase, an interactive web platform, was completed and available for online exploration in January 2021: https://encounters-right-left-hemispheres.online

In 2018, his cultural action company CREATIVE PROCESS, founded in 2011, began publishing books in the field of new media. To date, five books have been published including two devoted to MacLeay's work: Quadrichromie 1978–1988 (2018) and Encounters in the Right and Left Hemispheres (2020).

== Honors / awards / official selections ==
- Canada Council Doctoral Fellowship 1974/75
- New York Art Directors Club Award (1982) for the photographic work featured in the Stephen DeGange article « Cool Conceits, » Camera Arts (March/April 1981)
- Rockefeller Foundation Artist in Residence at the American Center in Paris for the project « Fragments Cycles Sons » : multi-media photographic exhibition for the 1982 Biennale Mois de la Photo de la Ville de Paris
- 10th Tokyo Video Festival : Special Merit Award for the excellence in musical composition for the videodance « Josette Einstein » (co-production : Centre Georges Pompidou, Daikiri, AAA, American Center, Blizz'Art)
- Video “(S)he (Plural)”(2016):

- Official Selection, Summer 2017 Hong Kong Arthouse Film Festival (June, 2017)

- Official Selection, 2017 Experimental Forum Festival in Los Angeles (screening: November 18, 2017)

- Award Winner, 2017 Canada Shorts: Canadian and International Short Film Festival, New Brunswick, Canada - November 2017

- Video Polyptych “Isolation Row (Naked Confusion Disguised as a Friend)” (2021):

- Award winner, 7th Art Independent International Film Festival, Vanchiyoor, India (November 2021)

- Award winner, Canada Shorts: Canadian and International Short Film Festival, New Brunswick, Canada (December 2021)

- Official Selection, Berlin International Art Film Festival, Berlin, Germany (November 2021)

- Semi-finalist, Tokyo Shorts Festival, Tokyo, Japan (February 2022)

- Finalist, Santa Barbara Shorts Festival, Santa Barbara, California, US (May 2022)

- Semi-finalist, Paris International Short Festival, Paris, France, (May 2022)

- Semi-finalist, New Short Filmmakers Festival, Austin, Texas, US (June 2022)

- Semi-finalist Rio de Janeiro World Film Festival, Rio de Janeiro, Brazil (July 2022)

- Video “Chance Encounter N°11” from the project “Encounters in the Right and Left Hemispheres” (2020):

- Official Selection, Stockholm City Film Festival, Stockholm, Sweden (June 2022)

- Official Selection, Miami Indie Film Awards, Miami, US (July 2022)

- Official Selection, LA Indies Film Festival, Los Angeles, US (July 2022)

- Semi-finalist, Tokyo Shorts Festival, Tokyo, Japan (August 2022)

- Video “Relativity: The Journey Inside” (2021):

- Award winner, Paris Film Awards, Paris, France (July 2022)

- Honorable Mention, London Movie Awards, London, England (August 2022)

- Semi-finalist, San Francisco Arthouse Short Festival, San Francisco, US (July 2022)

- Award winner, Hong Kong Indie Film Festival (August 2022)

- Semi-finalist, Munich Short Film Awards, Munich, Germany (August 2022)

- Official Selection, Florence Film Awards, Florence, Italy (August 2022)

- Official Selection, Toronto Indie Shorts Festival, Toronto, Canada (August 2022)

- Semi-finalist, Vancouver Movie Awards, Vancouver, Canada (September 2022)

- Nominated, Art Film Spirit Awards, Toronto, Canada (September 2022)

- Official Selection, Top Indie film Awards, Tokyo, Japan (January 2023)

- Semi-finalist, Prague Underground Film Festival, Czech Republic, (November 2022)

- Official Selection, Top Indie Film Awards, Tokyo, Japan (January 2023)

- Official Selection / Nominee, Berlin International Art Film Festival, Berlin, Germany (April 2023)

- Official Selection / Nominee, LA Indies Film Festival, Los Angeles, US (April 2023)

- Video “Waves of Informed Delusion”(2022):

- Award winner, London Indie Short Festival (September 2022)

- Special Mention, 01 NFT | New Media | Experimental | Digital Arts Film Festival, United Kingdom (March 2023)

- Honorable Mention, Experimental Forum Festival 2023, Los Angeles, US (April 2023)

- Video “Déjà Vu On The Ledge” (2022)

- Nominated, Berlin International Art Film Festival, Berlin, Germany (October 2022)

- Official Selection, Boston Independent Film Awards, Boston, US (October 2022)

- Award winner, Florence Film Awards, Florence, Italy (November 2022)

- Semi-finalist, Munich Short Film Awards, Munich, Germany (December 2022)

- Semi-finalist, 2023 ARFF Berlin International Awards, Berlin, Germany (December 2022)

- Semi-finalist, Rotterdam Independent Film Festival, Rotterdam, Holland (November 2022)

- Semi-finalist, Dublin Movie Awards, Dublin, Ireland (February 2023)

- Award winner, Best Experimental Film, London Movie Awards, London, England (March 2023)

== Selected Photography / New Media Exhibitions ==
- Galerie Royale : group exhibition, Vancouver, B.C. Canada (1976)
- Queen Elizabeth Theatre : group exhibition, Vancouver, B.C. Canada (1976)
- Photographer’s Studio : solo exhibition, Vancouver, B.C. Canada (1979)
- Snug Harbour Cultural Center : solo exhibition, Staten Island, New York (1980)
- The Space Gallery : solo exhibition Attitudes, New York (1980)
- Galérie Ufficio dell'Arte / Créatis: group exhibition Avant-Garde, Paris (1980)
- Gallery 3, Newhouse Center for Contemporary Art: solo exhibition, New York (1981)
- Mido Gallery : solo exhibition, Vancouver (1981)
- Deja Vu Gallery : solo exhibition, Toronto (1981)
- Equivalents Gallery : solo exhibition, Seattle (1982)
- AO Gallery : solo Exhibition, Tokyo (1982)
- American Center for Artists : solo exhibition Fragments Cycles Sons, Mois de la Photo, Paris (1982)
- La Maison de la Danse: solo exhibition, Lyon, France (1982)
- Port Washington Library: solo exhibition, Port Washington, New York (1983)
- Marcuse Pfeifer Gallery : solo exhibition Fragments, New York (1983)
- Marcuse Pfeiifer Gallery : group show, New York (1983)
- Gallery 1, University of Arkansas : solo exhibition, Little Rock (1983)
- Maine Photographic Workshops, group exhibition, Rockport (1983)
- Turman Gallery : group exhibition Figurative Contexts, Indiana State University (1983)
- Galérie Créatis : group exhibition, Paris (1983)
- de:Münchner Stadtmuseum, group exhibition, Munich (1984)
- Mido Gallery : solo exhibition, Vancouver (1984)
- Gallery Ton Peek : solo exhibition, Utrecht, The Netherlands (1984)
- American Center Gallery : group exhibition, Paris, France (1984)
- Contemporary Arts Center, New Orleans : group exhibition A Unity of Visions, New Orleans, US (1985)
- French Cultural Center: group exhibition, New York, US (1985)
- Marcuse Pfeifer Gallery : solo exhibition Primates 1s, 2s 3s, New York (1985)
- Amsterdam National Contemporary Art Fair : group exhibition, Amsterdam, the Netherlands (1985)
- Frankfurter Kunstverein: group exhibition, Frankfurt, Germany (1985)
- Museum des 20 (since 2011, 21er Haus): group exhibition, Vienna, Austria (1985)
- Museum für Kunst und Gewerbe: group exhibition, Hambourg, Germany (1985)
- Musée d'Art Moderne de la Ville de Paris: group exhibition Splendeurs et Misères du Corps, Paris (1988)
- Le Parvis, solo exhibition, Tarbes (1988)
- Museum für Kunst und Geschiche in Freiburg : group exhibition Glanz und Elend des Körpers, Freiburg (1989)
- Fundação Cultural Badesc : solo exhibition Cores Corpos e Coros, Florianópolis (2011)
- Museum of Fine Arts, Houston: group exhibition of Permanent Collection (2012)
- Museu de Arte de Santa Catarina: group exhibition Fotografia(s) Contemporânea Brasileira, Florianópolis (2013)
- Galeria Lindolf Bell, CIC : group exhibition Interferências: Scott MacLeay e Convidados, Florianópolis (2014)
- Artigo Rio Feira de Arte Contemporânea: Márcia Zoé Ramos I Escritório de Arte, Rio de Janeiro (2014)
- Galeria Boiteux : Scott MacLeay, New Work. Florianópolis, Brazil (2016)
- Galeria Pedra : group exhibition 3x3=1, Scott MacLeay / Lauro Andrade / Marco Giacomelli, Florianópolis, Brazil (2019)
- Galeria Maria Cláudia Alencar, solo exhibition R. Scott MacLeay: 40 anos de Provocação, Festival de Fotografia de Tiradentes, Tiradentes, Brazil (2020) - Exhibition cancelled 1 week prior to public opening due to Covid restrictions
- Le Parvis : group exhibition of permanent collection of Le Parvis Tarbes-Pau, Pau, France (2021)
- Online interactive project Encounters in the Right and Left Hemispheres, performance-based project by Scott MacLeay, with Tássya Karasiak and Scott MacLeay: https://encounters-right-left-hemispheres.online - Florianópolis, Brazil (2021)

== Selected musical compositions / sound designs ==
- Musical creation for Solo Version d’un Ballet…, choreography : Robert Kovich. Soirée Solos, Centre Georges Pompidou, (1983) – compositional collaboration with François Raffinot
- Musical creation for Long Distance, choreography : Ruth Barnes, Nadège MacLeay. American Center for Artists, Paris (1984) – compositional collaboration with François Raffinot
- Musical creation for Cité 1 (Eveil & Transport en Commun), choreography : Jean-Marc Matos. Biennale de Danse du Val-de-Marne (1985) – compositional collaboration with François Raffinot
- Musical creation for Wavelength, choreography : Nadège and Scott MacLeay, American Center, Paris, France – compositional collaboration with François Raffinot (1984)
- Musical creation Risky Business for Queeny commissioned by American soprano Amy Lavietes for the Festival de Musique of Île-de-France, Paris, France (1984)
- Musical creation for Josette Einstein (videodance), video artist : Jean-Bernard Pouchous / choreography : Jean-Marc Matos. Production : Centre Georges Pompidou, American Center, Daikiri, Blizz'Art, K-Danse. Paris (1986)
- Musical creation for La Pièce Voisine, choreography: Jeanette Dumeix et Marc Vincent. Théâtre 14, Paris (1987) – compositional collaboration with François Raffinot
- Musical theme for Video Création (générique Canal+), video artist : fr:Hervé Nisic. Production : Ex Nihilo, Paris (1988)
- Musical creation for 13 modules of Vidéopérette (live vidéo performance and vidéo art programme), video artist : fr:Michel Jaffrennou. Production : La Grande Halle-La Villette, Ex Nihilo, Canal+, Centre Georges Pompidou, Ex Machina, CDN productions, Duran, UMT, Mikros Image, Pandore, Pipa design, Ministry of Culture (France) (Direction du théâtre et Délégation aux arts plastiques), CNC nouvelles technologies. (1989)
- Musical Creation for Tour de France en 360° (first European 360° special format film for the Futuroscope, Poitiers), Director: Marc Sator. Production: Bakelite, Paris (1990)
- Musical creation for Longueur(s) d’onde (Le Prologue/Navigation/Le Feu), choreography : Nadège MacLeay. l'Espace Jacques Prévert, d'Aulnay sous Bois / Théatre Chatillon (1990)
- Music and lyrics for the CD Small Crowds (Les Petites Foules), contemporary cabaret opera interpreted by Private Circus. Label : Sordide Sentimental SSCD0004, Rouen (1990)
- Musical creation and sound designing for Antirouille (pilot for a TV programme on contemporary architecture and design): Direction: fr:Michel Jaffrennou and Odile Fillion. Production : Ex Nihilo, Centre Georges Pompidou, UMT (1990)
- Musical creation « Windy » for Futae, choreography : Nadège MacLeay. Dix-Huit Théâtre, Paris (1992)
- Musical creation for Le Grand Manège de la Forêt (installation video), Video artist: fr:Michel Jaffrennou for the Cité des Sciences et de l'Industrie – La Villette. Production: Ex Nihilo. Paris (1992)
- Musical creation for 2 Minutes d’Arret, choreography : Nadège MacLeay. Lantaren Venster Theater, Rotterdam (1992)
- Musical creation for White Water (Solo pour L / Tales of White Water), choreography : Nadège MacLeay. Le Regard du Cygne, Paris (1992/93)
- Musical creation and sound design for Dissimulation (fiction), video artist : fr:Hervé Nisic. Production: INA – La Sept ARTE (1993)
- CD Compilation of musical creations for contemporary dance La Moitié de l’Histore : creation pour la danse contemporaine, interpreted by Private Circus : Label : Sordide Sentimental SSFP99. Rouen (1994)
- Musical creation for Passage Oublié (Portées Disparues /Procession-Suspension), choreography : Nadège MacLeay. Festival 13, Theatre Dunois, Paris (1994)
- Musical creation for L’Europe en Multicoque (360° special format film for the Futuroscope, Poitiers) Director: Jean-Michel Destand. Production : Les Productions du Futuroscope. Paris/Poitiers (1995)
- Concepteur sonore & Mixage de Pierre et Le Loup de Sergueï Prokofiev, film de Michel Jaffrennou. Production : Capa Productions, Canal+. Paris (1995)
- Musical creation Siegfried for C’est Ça le Paradis ?, choreography : Nadège MacLeay. Rencontres Chorégraphiques Internationales de Seine-Saint-Denis, Maison du théâtre et de la Danse, Épinay-sur-Seine (1996)
- Musical creation Fenêtre(s) choreography : Nadège MacLeay., Vivat d'Armentières (1997) / Maison du Théâtre et de la Danse, Bruay la Buissière (1998)
- Music and lyrics of a series of contemporary works Numb (including I am Blind, But I Can See Saigon / Flat (E) / Suite: Am, Was Not, Might Be,...). Florianópolis (2014-2015).
- Musical creation for Metamorphosis IV, new media exhibition of Marco Giacomelli. Instituto Juarez Machado, Joinville, Brasil (2016)
- Musical creation for Escuridão Iluminada, new media exhibition of Lauro Andrade. Instituto Juarez Machado, Joinville, Brasil (2019/2020)
- Musical creation / sound designing for the transmedia project (interactive book / Web site / installation) Encounters in the Right and Left Hemispheres of Scott MacLeay, Creative Process, Florianópolis, Brasil (2020).
- Music and lyrics for the streaming album Celtic Days / Latin Nights, alternative American / country-rock music created in the 90s by Private Circus. Label: Creative Process (UPC: 672985909656), Florianópolis, Brazil (2021)
- Music and lyrics for the streaming album Locked Doors, Open Windows, a collection of alternative music created by Private Circus from 1990-2020. Label: Creative Process (UPC: 672985976788), Florianópolis, Brazil (2021)
- Musical soundtrack creation for Entre as linhas (Between The Lines) - multichannel video performance piece of Ruchita. Florianópolis, Brasil (2021)
- Musical creation and audio production for the 13 videos of Where I rest (Onde Repouso), new media e-book of Ruchita. Florianópolis, Brasil (2023)

== Curatorial work ==
- Photographic exhibitions for the Dept. of Photography of the American Center for Artists in Paris at the Arles Festival (1981–1986).
- Interferences – Scott MacLeay and guests: Gallery Lindolf Bell, CIC, Florianópolis (2014)
- Perspectiva(s): group show of young Brazilian new media artists at the Helena Fretta Galeria de Arte, Florianópolis, Brazil (2014)
- Hotel Esplêndido: Lura Fonseca at the Museu Inimá de Paula, Belo Horizonte, Brazil and MuMA, Curitiba, Brazil (2015)
- Definindo Tempo: Marco Giacomelli at the Helena Fretta Galeria de Arte, Florianópolis, Brazil (2015)
- Ondas de Luz: Marco Giacomelli for the Curitiba Biennial at MuMA, Curitiba, Brazil (2015)
- Sobre Aguas: Marco Giacomelli at the Museum of Image and Sound (MIS) in Florianópolis, Brazil (2016)
- Metamorphosis IV: Marco Giacomelli at the Instituto Internacional Juarez in Joinville, Brazil (2016)
- Artistic Coordinator and Curator of the Contemporary Art Prize of the Alliance Française for the State of Santa Catarina, Brazil (2016/2017)
- Transborda: Juliana Stringhini at the Instituto Internacional Juarez in Joinville, Brazil (2017)
- Transborda: Juliana Stringhini at the MESC (Museu de Escola Catarinense) in Florianópolis, Brazil (2018)
- Introspecções: Juliana Stringhini at the Galeria Pedra in Florianópolis, Brazil (2019)
- 3 x 3 = 1: Scott MacLeay / Lauro Andrade / Marco Giacomelli at the Galeria Pedra in Florianópolis, Brazil (2019)
- Escuridão Iluminada: Lauro Andrade at the Instituto Internacional Juarez in Joinville, Brazil (2019/2020)
- Somos Grãos: Ruchita at the Galeria de Arte da Villa Francioni, São Joaquim, Santa Catarina, Brazil (2021)
- Invisíveis: Gilma Mello at the Instituto Internacional Juarez in Joinville, Brazil (2022)
- Face à Impermanência: Ruchita at the Instituto Internacional Juarez in Joinville, Brazil (2023)

== Teaching work ==
- Professor of Photography: Focal Point, Vancouver BC (1977)
- Professor of Photography: Continuing Education Department, Langara College, Vancouver BC (1978–1979)
- Founder and Professor of Photography: Photography Department, American Center, Paris, France (1980–1987)
- Director (production, event programming and pedagogical program development in photography, video art an electronic music): Center for Media Art and Photography, American Center, Paris, France (1985–1987)
- Founder and Professor of Photography: MMAP (Music, Media Art, Photography), Paris, France (1987–1998)
- Professor of New Media Art / Photography: The Creative Process, Florianópolis, Brazil (2011–present)
- Professor of New Media Art / Photography: In Search of Imperfection - Plataforma Humanis, São Paulo, Brazil (2021)
- Professor of New Media Art / Photography: NucleoFac, Escola de Fotografia, Arte e Cultura, Belo Horizonte, Minas, Gerais, Brazil (2021)
- Professor of New Media Art / Photography: Advanced workshops on conceptual themes in portraiture, abstraction, interactive story-telling and digital media fields in various national institutions and festivals in Brazil including:

- Floripa na Foto (2011, 2013): Photographic Festival in Florianópolis, Brazil

- Foto Em Pauta – Festival de Fotografia de Tiradentes (2013, 2015, 2018, 2019, 2020): Photographic Festival in Tiradentes, Brazil

- Workshops BH (2012, 2013, 2019, 2020): Private Photographic workshops organized in Belo Horizonte, Brazil

- ICP – International Center of Photography (2012): Transmedia Workshop “Different Worlds in the Same Place” in collaboration with Professor Jeanne Hilary, ICP, New York, US

- BC Foto Festival (2014): Photographic Festival in Balneario Camboriú, Brazil

- Casa da Ladeira (2013, 2017, 2018): Photographic Association, Rio de Janeiro, Brazil

- SESC Santana (2014, 2017): Visual Arts Department, SESC, São Paulo, Brazil

- SESC 24 de Maio (2018): Visual Arts Department, SESC, São Paulo, Brazil

== Publishing activities ==
- MacLeay, R. Scott. Quadrichromie 1978–1988. Florianópolis, Brazil: Creative Process (2018)
- Marco Giacomelli. Metamorphosis 2013–2017. Florianópolis, Brazil: Creative Process (2018)
- Lauro Andrade. Viva A Vida. Florianópolis, Brazil: Creative Process (2018)
- MacLeay, R. Scott. Encounters in the Right and Left Hemispheres. Florianópolis, Brazil: Creative Process (2020)
- Lauro Andrade. EU (IN)DISCRETO. Florianópolis, Brazil: Creative Process (2020)

== Selected writings / photobooks ==
- G.D. Truc : The Man, the Book, Robert Scott MacLeay (Florianópolis, Brazil 2011)
- 19 articles/ 2 interviews on the art of photography for the bi-monthly Photo Magazine. Editora Photos, Balneário Camboriú, Brazil (year 7, N° 40 - year 9, N° 59)
- Pensar, Sentir, Ver : Percepção e Processo em Fotografia. Editora Photos, Balneário Camboriú, Brazil (2015)
- Quadrichromie 1978–1988. Creative Process, Florianópolis, Brazil (2018)
- Encounters in the Right and Left Hemispheres. Creative Process, Florianópolis, Brazil (2018)
- Thoughts On … the daily musings of an economist turned artist, Creative Process, Florianópolis, Brazil (2022)
- Futility as Rebirth, Creative Process Florianópolis, Brazil (2022)

== Audiovisual consulting and cultural project feasibility ==
=== Audiovisual project evaluation / market feasibility studies for regional development projects ===
- Project in Valmy for the SMPAC: Syndicat Mixte de l'Argonne Champenoise, (2000)
- Project in Colombey-les-Deux-Eglises for the Conseil Régional Champagne Ardenne (2001/2002)
- Project in Chateauvillain for the Conseil Général de la Haute Marne (2002)
- Project in Aix en Othe for the SMPO (Syndicat Mixte du Pays d'Othe (2003))

=== Audiovisual consulting on special format cinema and video installations ===
- Collaboration with Tao Ho (Tao Ho Design Architects, Hong Kong) and Patrick Besenval (XLargo France) for the concept plan for the Ocean Park Redevelopment Project (2000)
- Audiovisual consulting to Tao Ho Design Architects (Hong Kong) on project conception for tourist promotion installations for the cities of Hong Kong (Kowloon and North Point) (1999) and Guilin, China (2001).
