= Spanaway (album) =

Studio album by Seaweed
- Released: 1995
- Label: Hollywood
- Producers: Adam Kasper, Seaweed

Seaweed chronology
Go Your Own Way EP (1993)	Spanaway (1995)	Actions and Indications (1999)

Singles from Spanaway
- 1. "Start With" Released: July 31, 1995

Spanaway is an album by the American band Seaweed. It was released in 1995 on Hollywood Records. The album is named for the Washington community.

The first single was "Start With", which peaked at No. 38 on Billboard's Modern Rock Tracks chart. Seaweed supported the album with a North American tour, which included playing the 1995 Warped Tour. Spanaway was a commercial disappointment.

== Production ==
The album was produced primarily by Adam Kasper; it was mixed by Andy Wallace. Barrett Martin and Matt Cameron played drums on some tracks. Seaweed wrote the songs over a period of two years. "Magic Mountainman" is about singer Aaron Stauffer's farm near Franklin D. Roosevelt Lake; "Not Saying Anything" is about domestic discontent.

== Critical reception ==
Professional ratings
Review scores
Source	Rating
AllMusic	3/5 stars

Trouser Press noted that "increases in budget and studio time enable Seaweed to deliver its best work, an inspired major-label detour." The Austin Chronicle deemed it "a raw, in your-face, post-punk record." The Philadelphia Inquirer called Spanaway "sugar-charged anthem rock."

CMJ New Music Monthly noted that Seaweed "is at its best when slathering anthemic vocals, sharp hooks and meatgrinder guitars on top of a blistering 4/4" and praised their sound as "punk rock that's honest, that's fairly intelligent, and that packs a wollop." The Record determined that "the overall effect ... is still one of numbing, hyperclenched assault, with the group's chief virtue being mere moshability." The Sun-Sentinel concluded that Spanaway "follows the loud-fast rule of the new melodic punk genre with stinging guitars and maximum volume."

== Track listing ==
1. "Free Drug Zone" - 3:37
2. "Crush Us All" - 3:58
3. "Start With" - 4:02
4. "Common Mistake" - 2:47
5. "Magic Mountainman" - 3:46
6. "Saturday Nitrous" - 3:11
7. "Undeniable Hate" - 3:34
8. "Defender" - 2:40
9. "Assistant (to the manager)" - 3:35
10. "Punchy (the clown)" - 0:54
11. "Not Saying Anything" - 4:05
12. "Last Humans" - 3:22
13. "Peppy's Bingo" - 1:07
