= Martin Hannett's Personal Mixes =

Compilation album by Joy Division
- Released: June 2007
- Recorded: 1978–1980
- Genre: Post-punk
- Label: Interstate
- Producer: Martin Hannett

Joy Division compilations chronology
Les Bains Douches 18 December 1979 (2001)	Martin Hannett's Personal Mixes (2007)	The Best of Joy Division (2008)

Professional ratings
Review scores
Source	Rating
AllMusic	1.5/5 stars
Record Collector	3/5 stars

Martin Hannett's Personal Mixes is a compilation album by the British post-punk band Joy Division. It consists of studio snippets and alternative mixes of Joy Division made by Martin Hannett, their producer. The tapes of these sessions by Hannett were passed to Peter Hook who considered the outtakes and alternative versions to be an important part of Joy Division's recorded history.

== Track listing ==
CD (Interstate 10797) and double LP (Ozit)

1. "Synth Tone" – 0:16
2. "Hannett's Lift Recording 1" – 1:47
3. "Keyboard Doodles" – 4:20
4. "Lift Recording 2" – 2:36
5. "Number False Start 1" – 0:48
6. "Curtis, Hannett, Gretton Interplay, Chit Chat and Cup Smashing" – 1:13
7. "Hannett Speaks" – 0:34
8. "Number False Start 2" – 0:06
9. "From Safety to Where" – 2:28
10. "Autosuggestion" – 6:09
11. "Heart and Soul" – 5:51
12. "N4 Europop" – 6:10
13. "24 Hours" – 4:28
14. "Passover" – 4:46
15. "N4" – 6:08
16. "N4 (Vers. 2)" – 6:07
17. "The Eternal" – 6:20
18. "The Eternal (Vers. 2)" – 6:14
