= Basczax =

British post-punk band

- Origin: Teesside, England
- Genres: Post-punk
- Years active: 1978–1980, 2010
- Labels: Pipeline, Animated Tapes
- Past members: Alan Savage; Jeff Fogarty; Mick Todd; Nogel Trenchard; Cog; John Hodgson; Alan Cornforth

Basczax were a British post-punk band formed in Redcar in August 1978.

== History ==
The band was formed by Mick Todd, who recorded a demo of "Karleearn Photography", which convinced Jeff Fogarty (saxophone) and Alan Savage (guitar, vocals) to join. The line-up was completed for early performances by Nigel Trenchard (keyboards) and Cog (drums), but these were soon replaced by former Blitzkrieg Bop members John Hodgson (keyboards) and Alan Cornforth (drums).

Starting out as an anti-punk, almost anti-music noise band, they supported Gang of Four, amongst others in the early days. Basczax's first released material appeared on Fast Product's Earcom 2 mini-LP in 1979, alongside Joy Division. The band also released a 7" single on the Pipeline label: "Madison Fallout"/"Auto Mekanik Destruktor" (1979), which reached #48 on the UK Independent Chart.

Basczax toured with Orchestral Manoeuvres in the Dark (OMD), and appeared on the Check It Out TV show in 1980, performing "Ego Therapy". This lineup split in September 1980, with Hodgson and Cornforth going on to form "Makaton Chat" with ex-Deja Vu members Anthony Lindo, Graham Lipthorpe and Martin Alderdyce. John Hodgson now records under the name Fast Cakes, who released an album in August 2007 entitled LIVEYOUNGDIEFAST, a second album in September 2012 entitled CALL OFF THE DOGS and a third in 2014 entitled LIFESTORY. The three remaining members regrouped and continued. Eventually, after many lineup changes, the band mutated into Jank Mamba, and then The Flaming Mussolinis, who released two albums in the mid-1980s for Portrait Records (CBS).

Savage went on to form a band called Zoom, then another called Disraeli Gears, and released a solo CD in the 1990s on Darlington-based "Northern Sky".

A compilation of tracks recorded by Basczax between 1979 and 1980 entitled The Best Of was released (initially download only) in 2009 on Spectra Records.

In February 2010, four members from the 1979-80 line-up (Alan Savage, Jeff Fogarty, John Hodgson & Mick Todd) started recording together once again, with the view to releasing the first new Basczax material for almost 30 years. An album, entitled This Machine Rocks was released (download only) on 1 September 2010.

== Discography ==
=== Albums ===
- Terminal Madness (1979), Animated Tapes
- Earcom 2: Contradiction (1979), Fast Product – with Thursdays and Joy Division
- This Machine Rocks (2010), Morbius

Compilations

- The Best of Basczax (2009), Spectra

=== Singles ===
- "Madison Fallout" (1979), Pipeline
