= Weak (album) =

Studio album by Seaweed
- Released: 1992
- Studio: Bear Creek
- Genre: Punk, grunge
- Label: Sub Pop
- Producer: Jack Endino

Seaweed chronology
Despised (1991)	Weak (1992)	Four (1993)

Weak is an album by the American band Seaweed, released in 1992 on Sub Pop Records. At the time of the album's release, Seaweed was the youngest band on the Sub Pop roster.

"Recall" was a hit on college radio. Weak is singer Aaron Stauffer's least favorite Seaweed album.

== Production ==
The album was produced by Jack Endino. The band shared in the songwriting, which was often a contentious endeavor. The demos were recorded in guitar player Clint Werner's home studio. The album cover was shot at the Capitol Theater, in Olympia, Washington.

== Critical reception ==
Professional ratings
Review scores
Source	Rating
AllMusic	4/5 stars

The Chicago Tribune called the album "a tuneful tidal wave of loud sound" and "fairly strong (and somewhat bratty) stuff." The Tampa Tribune noted "a brash, punky whirlwind of sound, and lyrics that come from both Stauffer's personal traumas and a young man's angst about the social and political concerns." Trouser Press wrote that "[Wade] Neal and Werner boost the guitars, tangling awesome heaviness into chiming rhythmic work." Spin praised the "growling, fast-paced Gibson SG-ish guitar."

In 1996, the Fort Worth Star-Telegram deemed Weak the band's "guttural masterpiece." AllMusic concluded: "Combining the bottom-heavy throb that would epitomize the Northwest in the wake of Nirvana (Nevermind was released just months before the recording of this album) with a punchy, melodic power punk sound, Seaweed is Tacoma's answer to Superchunk." In 2022, Far Out included Weak on its list of 15 "essential" grunge albums.

== Track listing ==
1. "Recall" - 2:47
2. "The Way It Ends" - 2:46
3. "Baggage" - 3:08
4. "Stagger" - 3:20
5. "Taxing" - 4:36
6. "New Tools" - 2:59
7. "Bill" - 2:43
8. "Clean Slate" - 2:38
9. "Shut Up!" - 2:41
10. "Squint" - 2:25
