= Strange Fruit Records =

UK record label

- Founded: 1986
- Founder: Clive Selwood; John Peel
- Country of origin: United Kingdom
- Official website: www.strange-fruit-music.co.uk Archived 2004-12-08

Strange Fruit Records was an independent record label in the United Kingdom.

The label, established by Clive Selwood and John Peel in 1986, was the primary distributor of BBC recordings, including Peel Sessions.

The name came from the song written by Abel Meeropol and famously performed by Billie Holiday, itself a reference to racially motivated lynchings. The label had the aim of generating sufficient revenue from recordings of 'big name' artists to allow the release of recordings by lesser-known artists. The label's first release was New Order's 1982 Peel Session, in July 1987, and was followed by sessions from some of the biggest names from the punk rock and post punk eras. Recordings from as far back as the 1960s were also released by the likes of Jimi Hendrix and Bonzo Dog Doo-Dah Band. As well as individual sessions, the label also released albums compiling several sessions by the same artist. Strange Fruit was sufficiently successful that it spawned subsidiary labels including Nighttracks (sessions from radio One's Evening Show), Raw Fruit Records (concert recordings from the Reading Festival), and Band of Joy (BBC session recordings from the 1960s and 1970s). In 1994, Peel's BBC colleague Andy Kershaw started another subsidiary label, Strange Roots, which released session recordings by world music and roots artists from his radio show.

Strange Fruit closed in 2004. It was part of the Zomba Group of companies and was shut down when the label merged with BMG. The last release the label put together was an album of New Order's complete Peel Sessions, fitting as the first release that came out was an EP of New Order's first Peel session. Six months later John Peel died.

Clive Selwood died in June 2020.

== Strange Fruit Records catalogue (Peel Sessions, BBC) ==
Individual artists

- SFPS001 New Order
- SFPS002 The Damned
- SFPS003 The Screaming Blue Messiahs
- SFPS004 Stiff Little Fingers
- SFPS005 Sudden Sway
- SFPS006 The Wild Swans
- SFPS007 Madness
- SFPS008 Gang of Four
- SFPS009 The Wedding Present
- SFPS010 Twa Toots
- SFPS011 The Ruts
- SFPS012 Siouxsie and the Banshees
- SFPS013 Joy Division
- SFPS014 The Primevals
- SFPS015 June Tabor
- SFPS016 The Undertones
- SFPS017 Xmal Deutschland
- SFPS018 The Specials
- SFPS019 Stump
- SFPS020 The Birthday Party
- SFPS021 The Slits
- SFPS022 Spizz Oil
- SFPS023 The June Brides
- SFPS024 Culture
- SFPS025 The Prefects
- SFPS026 Yeah Yeah Noh
- SFPS027 Billy Bragg
- SFPS028 The Fall
- SFPS029 Girls at Our Best!
- SFPS030 The Redskins
- SFPS031 T.Rex
- SFPS032 Tubeway Army
- SFPS033 Joy Division
- SFPS034 The Adverts
- SFPS035 The Mighty Wah
- SFPS036 The Triffids
- SFPS037 Robert Wyatt
- SFPS038 That Petrol Emotion
- SFPS039 New Order
- SFPS040 The Damned
- SFPS041 Wire
- SFPS042 Electro Hippies
- SFPS043 Syd Barrett
- SFPS044 Buzzcocks
- SFPS045 Cud
- SFPS046 The Very Things
- SFPS047 Ultravox
- SFPS048 Extreme Noise Terror
- SFPS049 Napalm Death
- SFPS050 The Cure
- SFPS051 The Bonzo Dog Band
- SFPS052 The Nightingales
- SFPS053 Intense Degree
- SFPS054 Stupids
- SFPS055 The Smiths
- SFPS056 Bolt Thrower
- SFPS057 Half Man Half Biscuit
- SFPS058 The Birthday Party
- SFPS059 Lindisfarne
- SFPS060 Echo & the Bunnymen
- SFPS061 Family
- SFPS062 The Room
- SFPS063 Eton Crop
- SFPS064 Nico
- SFPS065 The Jimi Hendrix Experience
- SFPS066 Siouxsie and the Banshees
- SFPS067 Amayenge
- SFPS068 Ivor Cutler
- SFPS069 Unseen Terror
- SFPS070 The Four Brothers
- SFPS071 A Guy Called Gerald
- SFPS072 Inspiral Carpets
- SFPS073 Carcass
- SFPS074 The Go-Betweens
- SFPS075 The Associates
- SFPS076 Colorblind James Experience
- SFPS080 The Jam
- SFPS081 Teenage Fanclub

=== Compilations ===
- SFRLP100 The Sampler
- SFRLP101 Hardcore Holocaust
- SFRCD119 Too Pure (Th' Faith Healers, Stereolab, PJ Harvey)
- SFRLP200 21 Years Of Alternative Radio 1
- SFRLP111 Joy Division

=== Other albums ===
- SFRSCD016 or SFRSCD079 - Tom Paxton, Live In Concert (recorded in London, England in 1971 and 1972, released 1998)
- SFRSCD035 - Melanie, On Air [taken from November 75 concert, with added sessions from 1969 & 1989)
- SFRSCD036 - Joe Cocker and The Grease Band, On Air [taken from Top Gear 13 October 68; Symonds 14 October 68; DLT 21 September 69; and Top Gear 11 October 69) Released 1997
- SFRSCD037 - The Delgados, BBC Sessions (1997)
- SFRSCD077 - A House, Live In Concert
- SFRSCD082 - Inspiral Carpets, Radio 1 Sessions (1999)
- SFPSCD090 - Uzeda Recorded 8 May 1994 Maida Vale Studios BBC
- SFRSCD094 - Joy Division, The Complete BBC Recordings (2000)
- SFNT015 - Icicle Works "Radio 1 Sessions - The Evening Show" - Four track 12" EP, recorded 1982, released 1988.
- SFRCD114 - The Chameleons "John Peel Sessions" (1990)
- SFRCD201 - Soft Machine "The Peel Sessions" - All tracks recorded for BBC Top Gear.

A bootleg of the White Power rock band Skrewdriver's Peel Session exists, in very bad quality and with a cover in the style of the Strange Fruit Peel Session releases. It however is not a Strange Fruit release.

== See also ==
- Dandelion Records, a record label previously established by John Peel which operated from 1969 to 1973
- List of record labels
- List of independent UK record labels
- Category:Peel Sessions recordings
