= Earcom 2: Contradiction =

EP by Various artists

EP by Various artists
- Released: October 5, 1979
- Recorded: April 1979, Strawberry Studios, Stockport (Joy Division); June 1979, Barclay Towers, Edinburgh (Thursdays); June 1979, Cargo Studios, Rochdale (Basczax)
- Genre: Punk rock; Post-punk
- Label: Fast Product

Joy Division singles and EPs chronology
"Transmission" (1979)	Earcom 2: Contradiction (1979)	"Licht und Blindheit" (1980)

Earcom 2: Contradiction is a compilation EP released on October 5, 1979 through the Fast Product label. Six tracks in length, the EP is split into two songs by three post-punk bands, being Thursdays, Basczax, and Joy Division.

== Track listing ==
12" vinyl (Fast Product FAST9B)

Side 1

1. Thursdays: "Perfection" (2:55)
2. Basczax: "Celluloid Love" (3:24)
3. Basczax: "Karleearn Photography" (6:17)

Side 2

1. Joy Division: "Autosuggestion" (6:06)
2. Joy Division: "From Safety to Where...?" (2:29)
3. Thursdays: "(Sittin' On) The Dock of the Bay" (3:48)
