= Seaweed (band) =

American rock band

- Origin: Tacoma, Washington, United States
- Genres: Emo, punk rock, alternative rock, grunge, post-hardcore
- Years active: 1989–1999; 2007–2014
- Labels: Sub Pop; Hollywood; Merge; Tupelo
- Members: Aaron Stauffer; Clint Werner; Wade Neal; John Atkins; Bob Bulgrien; Alan Cage; Jesse Fox

Seaweed was an American alternative rock band from Tacoma, Washington, who were active throughout the 1990s. Their style of music was a combination of different rock subgenres, including post-hardcore and punk rock. They were signed to various notable record labels, such as Sub Pop Records, Merge Records, and Hollywood Records. The band released six albums between 1989 and 1999, followed by a hiatus that lasted until 2007. They then disbanded a second time in 2014.

== History ==
=== Seaweed and Despised (1989–1991) ===
The band started out in 1989, consisting of vocalist Aaron Stauffer, guitarist Clint Werner, guitarist Wade Neal, bassist John Atkins, and drummer Bob Bulgrien. All five members were still attending high school at the time, and most of them were already active in other local bands. Their early influences included a wide variety of bands, such as Soundgarden, Dag Nasty, Minor Threat, Black Flag, Hüsker Dü, Soul Asylum, Iron Maiden, the Beatles, Misfits, 7 Seconds, Melvins, Screaming Trees, Beat Happening, and Nirvana.

Their first major tour was alongside the band Superchunk. Throughout 1989 and 1990, the band would release various one-off singles. Later on in 1990, a smaller label known as Tupelo (known for releases by the bands Jawbreaker, Nirvana, and The Melvins) approached the band to release their first album. Instead, the band compiled their previous singles, and recorded one new song, to release Seaweed. As stated in later interviews and the name of the band's 1993 album, Seaweed was considered to be the band's first major release.

In 1990, Seaweed signed to the thriving Seattle label Sub Pop. The label wanted a single but the band wanted a full-length album. They met halfway, and released the EP Despised. Six songs were brand new tracks, recorded with producer Jack Endino. The remaining four tracks were slightly remixed from their previous release, Seaweed; thus, angering their former label Tupelo. On foreign editions of the album, the aforementioned four tracks were not included. A music video was created for "One Out of Four" off of Despised, which was the band's first music video of their career.

=== Weak and Four (1992–1994) ===
The band continued their relationship with Sub Pop, releasing their third major release (and first actual full-length album) in 1992, titled Weak. Again produced by Endino, the band supported the album with a summer U.S. tour, followed by a condensed European tour with the band Pavement, stretching 69 shows over 71 days. Also in 1992, the band made an in-studio appearance on the radio program hosted by John Peel. After the exhausting touring schedule, the band went home to record their follow-up album.

After impressing Sub Pop with their self-production work on a single titled "Measure", the label allowed the band to self-produce their 1993 effort Four (the title referred to the album as the band's fourth major release). Sub Pop promoted the album more heavily than their past albums, releasing more versions of this album and having their songs featured on more compilations. Around this time, Seaweed toured with the bands Bad Religion and Green Day, a tour that Green Day bassist Mike Dirnt joked as "The BadGreenWeed Tour". Four contained the single "Kid Candy", which was most prominently featured in a season four episode of the TV show Beavis and Butt-head. "Losing Skin" was also released as a single from this album, and would be more prominently featured on the soundtrack for the video game NHL 2K7 13 years later. Seaweed also got another shot at exposure, as their cover of Fleetwood Mac's hit song "Go Your Own Way" was featured in the 1994 film Clerks and its soundtrack (the song was initially released as a standalone single one year earlier however).

=== Spanaway and Actions and Indications (1995–1999) ===
After fulfilling their contract to Sub Pop, Seaweed signed a contract with the major record label Hollywood Records. Their 1995 album Spanaway became the band's major label debut, and their most successful to date. The single "Start With" became Seaweed's only appearance on a Billboard chart, peaking at No. 38 on the Alternative Songs chart in 1995. "Free Drug Zone" and "Magic Mountainman" also got released as promotional singles. In the summer of that year, Seaweed was notable as being a part of the lineup for the first ever Vans Warped Tour; however, unlike many of the other bands, they would not make any more appearances after that year. They also opened for Screaming Trees throughout 1996. Despite the label's initial large financial advance and marketing promises, the album did not sell well as expected. It took the band over a year to be released from their contract.

Afterwards, the band experienced their first lineup change as drummer Bulgrien left the band. He was replaced by Quicksand drummer Alan Cage. The band then decided on the label Merge Records as their next home. The label was putting out albums by Seaweed's friends such as Superchunk and Neutral Milk Hotel, and so the transition was seamless. The band's final album, Actions and Indications, came out in early 1999; however, the exposure from their previous two albums had diminished, and the band was exhausted from touring. After playing an anniversary show for Merge Records in the summer of 1999, Seaweed disbanded.

=== Reunion (2007–2014) ===
In 2007, Seaweed reunited to play sporadic shows, including Sub Pop's 20th anniversary show in 2008. The reunited lineup included new member Jesse Fox on drums. The band had mentioned a new album was being recorded, titled Small Engine Repair. The album never came to fruition, as the band did not have a creative drive, and also did not want to extensively tour. A few songs from the sessions were later released in 2011, as the "Service Deck"/"The Weight" single. A third song was later released in the summer of 2014, "Rusty Ranch", on a compilation titled MAWP Comp Volume 1. Seaweed played various shows and festivals from 2007 to 2014, but no full tour. Their last show was in May 2014. Frontman Stauffer later worked as a nurse in Northern California and said in an interview that "It’s hard to play a show because it hurts me physically. I only have one show in me. I can't do two."

Since Seaweed's albums spanned different labels, the only release to see a reissue to date is 1999's Actions and Indications, which also included three unreleased bonus tracks as a download.

== Band members ==
- Aaron Stauffer – vocals (1989–1999, 2007–2014)
- Clint Werner – guitar (1989–1999, 2007–2014)
- Wade Neal – guitar (1989–1999, 2007–2014)
- John Atkins – bass (1989–1999, 2007–2014)
- Bob Bulgrien – drums (1989–1996)
- Alan Cage – drums (1996–1999)
- Jesse Fox – drums (2007–2014)

== Discography ==
=== Albums ===
- Seaweed (EP) (1990, Leopard Gecko/Tupelo)
- Despised (EP) (1991, Sub Pop)
- Weak (1992, Sub Pop)
- Four (1993, Sub Pop)
- Spanaway (1995, Hollywood Records)
- Actions and Indications (1999, Merge Records)

=== Singles ===
- Seaweed 7" (1989, Leopard Gecko)
  1. "Inside"
  2. "Stargirl"
  3. "Re-think"
  4. "Love Gut"
- Just a Smirk 7" (1990, Leopard Gecko)
  1. "Just a Smirk"
  2. "Installing"
- Seaweed/Superchunk/Geek" (1990, Leopard Gecko)
  1. "Patchwork"
- Deertrap 7" (1991, K Records)
  1. "Deertrap"
  2. "Carousel"
- Bill 7" (1992, Subpop)
  1. "Bill"
  2. "Pumpkin (Wwax)"
- Bill 12"/CD (1992, Subpop)
  1. "Bill"
  2. "Pumpkin (Wwax)"
  3. "Squint: The Killerest Expression"
- Measure 7" (1992, Subpop)
  1. "Measure"
  2. "Turnout"
- Measure 12"/CD (1992, Subpop)
  1. "Measure"
  2. "Turnout"
  3. "Taxing" (demo version)
- Go Your Own Way CD (1993, Subpop)
  1. "Go Your Own Way"
  2. "Losing Skin" (remix)
  3. "Card Tricks"
  4. "She Cracked"
- Go Your Own Way 7"/CD (1993, Subpop)
  1. "Go Your Own Way"
  2. "Losing Skin" (remix)
  3. "She Cracked"
- Kid Candy PROMO CD (1993, Subpop)
  1. "Kid Candy" (radio edit)
  2. "Sing Through Me"
  3. "Shephard's Pie"
- Start With PROMO CD (1995, Hollywood)
  1. "Start With"
- Free Drug Zone 7" (1996, Hollywood)
  1. "Free Drug Zone"
  2. "Losing Skin" (live)
- Free Drug Zone CD (1996, Hollywood)
  1. "Free Drug Zone"
  2. "Losing Skin" (live)
  3. "Baggage" (live)
- Magic Mountainman PROMO CD (1996, Hollywood)
  1. "Magic Mountain"
- Service Deck/The Weight 7" (2011, No Idea Records)
  1. "Service Deck"
  2. "The Weight"

=== Music videos ===
- One Out of Four (1991)
- Bill (1992)
- Squint (1992)
- Measure (1993)
- Losing Skin (1993)
- Kid Candy (1993)
- Start With (1995)

=== Compilation appearances ===
- The Estrus Lunch Bucket (Estrus, 1990)
  - "Bewitched"
- Three's A Company (Simple Machines/Merge Records/Leopard Gecko, 1990)
  - "Patchwork"
- The Estrus Half-Rack (Estrus, 1991)
  - "Foggy Eyes"
- International Pop Underground Convention (K Records, 1991)
  - "Bill"
- Fortune Cookie Prize (Simple Machines, 1992)
  - "Foggy Eyes"
- Revolution Come 'n' Gone (Subpop, 1992)
  - "Baggage"
- International Hip Swing (K Records, 1993)
  - "Deer Trap"
- Alternative Route '94 (Cargo Records, 1994)
  - "Losing Skin"
- Jabberjaw No. 4 (Mammoth Records, 1994)
  - "My Letters"
- Jabberjaw No. 5 Good To The Last Drop (Mammoth Records, 1994)
  - "My Letters"
- John Peel Sub Pop Sessions (Sub Pop, 1994)
  - "Sit in Glass"
  - "She Cracked"
- Music From the Motion Picture Clerks (Sony, 1994)
  - "Go Your Own Way"
- West X North-South (Vagrant Records, 1995)
  - "Sing Through Me"
- Oh, Merge (Merge Records, 1999)
  - "Brand New Order"
- Nowcore! The Punk Rock Evolution (K-tel, 1999)
  - "Start With"
- Patchwork Compilation (Mere Exposure Records, 2002)
  - "Days Missed Dearly"
- Old Enough to Know Better (Merge Records, 2004)
  - "Thru the Window"
- Sleepless in Seattle: The Birth of Grunge (Livewire Recordings, 2005)
  - "Losing Skin"
- SP20: Casual Nostalgia Fest (Sub Pop, 2010)
  - "Baggage"
- MAWP Comp Volume 1 (MAWP Tacoma, 2014)
  - "Rusty Ranch"
- Merge Records Fall Sampler 2015 (Merge Records, 2015)
  - "Antilyrical"
