= The Prats =

Edinburgh punk rock band

- Origin: Edinburgh, Scotland, United Kingdom
- Genres: Punk rock; post-punk
- Years active: 1977–1981
- Labels: Fast Product; Rough Trade; One Little Indian
- Past members: Paul McLaughlin; David Maguire; Greg Maguire; Tom Robinson; Jeff Maguire; Elspeth McLeod
- Website: theprats.co.uk

The Prats were an Edinburgh-based punk rock group, active from 1977 to 1981. Their track "General Davis" was featured in the opening credits of Jonathan Demme's 2004 film, The Manchurian Candidate.

== History ==
The group was founded in 1977 at St. Augustine's Roman Catholic Comprehensive by Paul McLaughlin, David Maguire, Greg Maguire, and Tom Robinson, whose ages at the time ranged from 12 to 15. While their instruments were basic, including a cardboard drum kit, they were able to quickly produce a demo tape which they sent to a local indie label Fast Product, who also produced the Human League. Inspired by The Slits and Mekons, the Prats debuted with three tracks on the Fast EP Earcom 1.

In 1979, the band recorded a session for John Peel's BBC Radio 1 show. Peel also offered his fee from a DJing appearance in Edinburgh to finance a single release by the band. A series of singles then followed, including "General Davis" and "Die Todten Reyten Schnell," which was released on a German indie label.

A number of line-up changes saw Elspeth McLeod joining to provide additional guitar (including on the single "General Davis") and Jeff Maguire taking over bass duties from Tom Robinson.

In 1980, the EP "The 1990s Pop" was released on Rough Trade. This record contained four tracks: "Disco Pope", "Nothing", "TV Set", and "Nobody Noticed". "Disco Pope" received significant airplay under John Peel and was re-released in 2003 on Rough Trade Shops' compilation CD Post Punk Volume 1.

The end of school in 1981 meant the end of the Prats. Paul McLaughlin was quoted as saying "Bands are like marriages between four people. You just stop getting on with each other."

McLaughlin, now living in Chelmsford, has released one solo single, "Party Girl". He has since then given up on music and is currently a trade union official with the National Education Union; Dave, Greg, Tom and Elspeth all live in the Edinburgh area. Bass guitarist Jeff Maguire died from stage 4 cancer in July 2020. One of his last days was spent with his friends singing "Disco Pope".

== The Manchurian Candidate soundtrack ==
With the appearance of the song "General Davis" on the soundtrack of Jonathan Demme's 2004 remake of The Manchurian Candidate, starring Denzel Washington and Meryl Streep, there has been a resurgence of interest in the Prats, resulting in the release of a compilation CD, Now That's What I Call Prats Music released by One Little Indian in 2005.

== Discography ==
=== Singles and EPs ===
- 1990s Pop EP (1980), Rough Trade – UK Indie No. 31
- "Die Todten Reyten Schnell" (1980), DADA
- "General Davis" (1981), Rough Trade

=== Albums ===
- Now That's What I Call Prats Music (2005), One Little Indian

=== Compilation appearances ===
- Earcom 1 (1979), Fast Product: "Bored", "Prats 2", "Inverness"
