= An Ideal for Living =

EP by Joy Division
- Released: 3 June 1978
- Recorded: 14 December 1977
- Studio: Pennine, Oldham, England
- Genre: Punk rock
- Length: 12:26
- Label: Enigma; Anonymous
- Producer: Joy Division

Joy Division chronology
An Ideal for Living (1978)	Unknown Pleasures (1979)

Alternative cover
- 12-inch cover

An Ideal for Living is the first record by the English rock band Joy Division. The EP was released on 3 June 1978 through the band's own label, Enigma, shortly after the group changed their name from Warsaw. The recording took place in Oldham in December 1977. The original 7-inch record cover features a blond Hitler Youth member beating a drum.

== Background ==
All songs were recorded at Pennine Sound Studios in Oldham on 14 December 1977. The recording sessions were self-financed by the group, on a budget of £400 (equivalent to £2,350 in 2025). The release reflects the band's early punk influences, as opposed to the post-punk style they later developed. In an interview with Uncut magazine in 2001, drummer Stephen Morris stated that when making the EP, the band requested the engineer make the drums sound like "Speed of Life", the opening track on David Bowie's 1977 album Low. "Strangely enough he couldn't". Low featured a unique drum sound that became widely imitated following its release, although producer Tony Visconti refused to explain how he made it for many years.

=== Record cover ===
The cover has a black-and-white picture of a blond Hitler Youth member beating a drum, which was drawn by guitarist Bernard Sumner (called "Bernard Albrecht" on the poster sleeve) and the words "Joy! Division" printed in a blackletter font. The cover design, coupled with the nature of the band's name, fueled controversy over whether the band had Nazi sympathies. The foldout of the EP contains pasted cutouts of both the band and the Warsaw Ghetto boy, with a lyrical excerpt from 'Leaders of Men'. In 1978, the EP was re-released on 12-inch vinyl; the original cover was replaced by artwork featuring scaffolding designed by cartoonist and illustrator Steve McGarry.

== Release and critical reception ==
A 7-inch version of An Ideal for Living was released in June 1978 on the band's own Enigma label, which was sold out by September and was subsequently followed by a 12-inch version on 10 October on the band's own Anonymous Records label.

All four tracks were re-released on the 1988 singles compilation Substance. A remastered version of the EP was reissued by Rhino Entertainment to coincide with Record Store Day 2014.

=== Legacy ===
Professional ratings
Review scores
Source	Rating
AllMusic	3/5 stars
Melody Maker	(favourable)

In a retrospective review, David Cleary of AllMusic wrote that "[the] sound quality and production values on this release are extremely primitive", while describing the release as "a mildly interesting, if not great EP". He also noted that with the re-release of "Warsaw" and "Leaders of Men" on the rarities album Substance (the other two were originally only included on CD and cassette versions of the album), the need for diehard Joy Division fans to obtain this EP had notably decreased.

Trouser Press described the EP as "skillful but rather unexceptional" and noted the strong influence of Bowie's music on the band.

The EP's title subsequently inspired Manic Street Preachers' single "A Design for Life".

== Track listing ==
All tracks are written by Joy Division.

No.	Title	Length
1.	"Warsaw"	2:26
2.	"No Love Lost"	3:42
3.	"Leaders of Men"	2:34
4.	"Failures"	3:44
Total length:		12:26

== Personnel ==
- Bernard Sumner (credited as Bernard Albrecht) – guitar
- Ian Curtis – vocals
- Stephen Morris – drums
- Peter Hook – bass

== Release history ==
Vinyl	Date	Label
7-inch	3 June 1978	Enigma Records
12-inch	10 October 1978	Anonymous Records
