= 45 obrtaja: Priče o pesmama =

2007 book by Dejan Cukić

- Author: Dejan Cukić
- Language: Serbian
- Published: 2007 (Laguna)
- Publication place: Serbia
- Media type: Print
- Pages: 438 pages
- ISBN: 978-86-7436-733-9
- OCLC: 440167669

45 obrtaja: Priče o pesmama (Serbian Cyrillic: 45 обртаја: Приче о песмама, trans. 45 Revolutions: Stories about Songs) is a book by Serbian rock musician, journalist and writer Dejan Cukić. It was published in 2007 and compiled mostly from his articles previously published in Politikin Zabavnik magazine. The book features biographies of forty-five music artists, as well as the history of popular music through stories about forty-five songs.

== Synopsis ==
The book title refers to the speed (45 revolutions per minute) of a vinyl single. Although the book, consistent with the title, has forty-five chapters, it deals with forty-six songs, the epilogue being an analysis of Don McLean's "American Pie" lyrics. The Rolling Stones are the only artists represented with two songs ("(I Can't Get No) Satisfaction" and "Sympathy for the Devil"), while the chapter on "Walk This Way" features biographies of both Aerosmith and Run-DMC The Chapter "Shine On You Crazy Diamond" deals with the history of the band Pink Floyd, with a special accent on one of its former band members, Syd Barrett. The chapter on "Dancing in the Street" performed by Martha and the Vandellas also focuses on the history of Motown Records, the chapter on "Woodstock", originally performed by Crosby, Stills, Nash & Young, focuses mostly on the career of the song author Joni Mitchell, as well as on the event itself and the chapter on "Tiny Dancer" performed by Elton John also focuses on the career of movie director Cameron Crowe and his movie Almost Famous, in which the song is featured.

Every chapter features a Serbian language translation of the song lyrics, except the chapter on "Walk This Way" which features an apology by the writer who states he can not translate the song lyrics (possibly because of the slang or the sexual innuendo featured in the lyrics). The book also features several autobiographical moments from Cukić's career as a member of Tilt, Bulevar, Bajaga i Instruktori, as well as from his solo career.
