= Atmosphere (Joy Division song) =

Song by Joy Division

"Licht und Blindheit"

Single by Joy Division
- A-side: "Atmosphere"
- B-side: "Dead Souls"
- Released: 18 March 1980
- Genre: Gothic rock art rock
- Length: 4:09
- Label: Sordide Sentimental
- Songwriters: Bernard Sumner; Peter Hook; Stephen Morris; Ian Curtis
- Producer: Martin Hannett

Joy Division singles chronology
"Transmission" (1979)	"Licht und Blindheit" (1980)	"Komakino" (1980)

"Atmosphere"
- 1980 UK release

Single by Joy Division
- B-side: "She's Lost Control"
- Released: September 1980
- Length: 4:05
- Label: Factory
- Songwriters: Bernard Sumner; Peter Hook; Stephen Morris; Ian Curtis
- Producer: Martin Hannett

Joy Division singles chronology
"Love Will Tear Us Apart" (1980)	"Atmosphere" (1980)

1988 release

Music video
- "Atmosphere" on YouTube

"Atmosphere" is a song by the English post-punk band Joy Division. It was originally released in March 1980 by the Sordide Sentimental label as the "Licht und Blindheit" (German for "Light and Blindness") package, a France-only limited-edition single featuring the track "Dead Souls" as the B-side. Following Ian Curtis's death in May 1980, it was re-released as a 12" single by Factory Records in September with "She's Lost Control" as the B-side.

The single was re-released in 1988 to coincide with the release of the compilation album Substance, and a music video was produced for the song.

== Recording ==
Joy Division had written an early version of "Atmosphere" titled "Chance", which was recorded for a Manchester radio session in June 1979. They later recorded the final version of "Atmosphere" in October 1979 with Martin Hannett at Cargo Studios in Rochdale. The keyboards used in the song were a "Woolworth's Winfield brown Bakelite plastic reed organ," and a Solina String Ensemble. Both of which were performed by Bernard Sumner. According to drummer Stephen Morris, the shimmering sound present in the song was achieved by striking "a tambourine balanced on a pair of scissors" and then manipulating the sound with a variety of effects, including delay.

== Release ==
The song was originally released on 18 March 1980 by the label Sordide Sentimental as a France-only 7" single under the title "Licht und Blindheit" (German for "Light and Blindness"). It was limited to 1578 copies and featured the track "Dead Souls" as the B-side. John Peel played "Atmosphere" for the first time on his show on 11 March 1980 and "Dead Souls" the following night.

Following the death of lead vocalist Ian Curtis in May 1980, "Atmosphere" was released as a 12" single along with "She's Lost Control". "Atmosphere" was the A-side for the UK release but the B-side for the US release. "She's Lost Control" is an alternative version of the one that appears on the band's debut studio album Unknown Pleasures (1979). The single peaked at number 1 in New Zealand in August 1981, and it would later re-chart there in July 1984 (number 17) and when it was reissued in August 1988 (number 5). "Atmosphere" also reached the top of the UK Indie Chart in October 1980, hit the number 2 spot of that same chart in July 1988,, and hit number 34 in the UK Singles Chart during June 1988. The single was re-released in 1988 to coincide with the release of the compilation album Substance.

== Music video ==
A music video was released for the song with the single's re-release in 1988. It contains characters wearing black-hooded cloaks and white burial shrouds carrying around large pictures of the band. It was directed by Anton Corbijn (responsible for much of the early Joy Division photography, and who later directed the Ian Curtis 2007 biopic Control).

== Critical reception ==
Ned Raggett of AllMusic wrote, "Atmosphere" is another one of those prime Joy Division songs, like "Transmission" or "Love Will Tear Us Apart", where Martin Hannett's production becomes so essential to the end result that it couldn't have been heard otherwise", noting that, in regard to Ian Curtis's mental state and subsequent death, "there's a feeling of a requiem here, an awesome musical farewell."

In 2009, NME voted the song number 1 in its list "The 20 Greatest Goth Tracks".

== Legacy ==
"Atmosphere" featured in the film 24 Hour Party People (2002) just after Ian Curtis's suicide is portrayed. The song is also used at the end of the Ian Curtis biopic Control. It was played at Tony Wilson's funeral. OMD frontman Andy McCluskey named "Atmosphere" as the track he would like to be played at his own funeral, adding, "That song is the definition of melancholic beauty. I never, ever get tired of hearing it."

Joy Division's bassist, Peter Hook, has said he regards the song as one of the band's greatest.

== Track listings ==
All songs written and composed by Joy Division (Ian Curtis, Peter Hook, Stephen Morris and Bernard Sumner).

"Licht und Blindheit" (7")

Side A
No.	Title	Length
1.	"Atmosphere"	4:10

Side B
No.	Title	Length
1.	"Dead Souls"	4:53

"Atmosphere" (12")

Side A
No.	Title	Length
1.	"Atmosphere"	4:10

Side B
No.	Title	Length
1.	"She's Lost Control"	4:45

1988 re-release
7"

Side A
No.	Title	Length
1.	"Atmosphere"	4:10

Side B
No.	Title	Length
1.	"The Only Mistake"	4:19

12"

Side A
No.	Title	Length
1.	"Atmosphere"	4:10

Side B
No.	Title	Length
1.	"The Only Mistake"	4:19
2.	"Sound of Music"	3:55

CD

No.	Title	Length
1.	"Atmosphere"	4:10
2.	"Transmission (Live)"	3:37
3.	"Love Will Tear Us Apart"	3:27

== Chart positions ==
Chart (1981)	Peak position
New Zealand (Recorded Music NZ)	1

Chart (1984)	Peak position
New Zealand (Recorded Music NZ)	17

Chart (1988)	Peak position
New Zealand (Recorded Music NZ)	5
UK Singles Chart	34

== See also ==
- Joy Division discography
