= Les Bains Douches 18 December 1979 =

Live album by Joy Division
- Released: April 2001
- Recorded: 18 December 1979 – 18 January 1980
- Genre: Post-punk
- Length: 65:27
- Label: NMC

Joy Division chronology
The Complete BBC Recordings (2000)	Les Bains Douches 18 December 1979 (2001)	Martin Hannett's Personal Mixes (2007)

Professional ratings
Review scores
Source	Rating
AllMusic	4.5/5 stars

Les Bains Douches 18 December 1979 is a live album by English post-punk band Joy Division; it was partly recorded on 18 December 1979 at Le Bains Douches in Paris. It was released in 2001 by record label NMC. Additional tracks are drawn from two other concerts.

== Content ==
=== Album artwork ===
The artwork was done by Peter Saville. The CD booklet contained a reprint of the original poster for the show.

== Reception ==
Pitchfork, commenting on Joy Division's live output, wrote: "Les Bains Douches, by itself, is flawless; of the available recordings there are none better".

== Track listing ==
All tracks written by Joy Division (Ian Curtis, Peter Hook, Stephen Morris and Bernard Sumner).

1. "Disorder" – 3:21
2. "Love Will Tear Us Apart" – 3:17
3. "Insight" – 3:25
4. "Shadowplay" – 3:46
5. "Transmission" – 3:19
6. "Day of the Lords" – 4:39
7. "Twenty Four Hours" – 4:12
8. "These Days" – 3:42
9. "A Means to an End" – 4:17
10. "Passover" – 2:18
11. "New Dawn Fades" – 4:40
12. "Atrocity Exhibition" – 6:56
13. "Digital" – 3:39
14. "Dead Souls" – 4:46
15. "Autosuggestion" – 4:13
16. "Atmosphere" – 4:47

Note: Tracks 1–9 recorded at Les Bains Douches, Paris, 18 December 1979; tracks 10–12 recorded at Paradiso, Amsterdam, The Netherlands, 11 January 1980; and tracks 13–16 recorded at Effenaar, Eindhoven, The Netherlands, 18 January 1980.
