= Sordide Sentimental =

French record label

Sordide Sentimental is a French record label, founded in 1978 by Jean-Pierre Turmel and Yves Von Bontee, notable for its releases of early works by Joy Division, Throbbing Gristle, Psychic TV and others.

== Artists ==
- Monte Cazazza
- Davie Allan & The Arrows
- Durutti Column
- Grrzzz
- Joy Division
- Krackhouse
- Martyn Bates (Eyeless in Gaza)
- Psychic TV
- Rosa Crux
- The Red Crayola
- Savage Republic
- Steeple Remove
- Throbbing Gristle
- Problemist
- Tuxedomoon
- Private Circus (Scott MacLeay)
- The Bizarros
