= The Peel Sessions (Joy Division) =

Album by Joy Division recorded in 1979

The Joy Division Peel sessions are a series of sessions recorded by English post-punk band Joy Division for John Peel's radio show on BBC Radio 1 between January and November 1979.

== Releases ==
=== The Peel Sessions EP (1986) ===
The Peel Sessions

EP by Joy Division
- Released: November 1986
- Recorded: 31 January 1979
- Label: Strange Fruit
- Producer: Bob Sargeant

Joy Division chronology
Still (1981)	The Peel Sessions (1986)	The Peel Sessions (1987)

Professional ratings
Review scores
Source	Rating
AllMusic	3/5 stars

The first EP, The Peel Sessions, was released in 1986 by record label Strange Fruit. It features recordings made for John Peel's show broadcast on 14 February 1979, and was recorded at the BBC Studios in Maida Vale, London, England on 31 January 1979. None of the songs had been released prior to the broadcast. The version of "Transmission" is one of the few recordings available where both Curtis and Sumner play guitar at the same time.

The EP spent 13 weeks on the UK Indie Chart, peaking at number 4.

==== Track listing ====
All tracks are written by Joy Division.

Side A
No.	Title	Length
1.	"Exercise One"	2:30
2.	"Insight"	3:55

Side B
No.	Title	Length
1.	"She's Lost Control"	4:10
2.	"Transmission"	3:55

=== The Peel Sessions EP (1987) ===
The Peel Sessions

EP by Joy Division
- Released: September 1987
- Recorded: 26 November 1979
- Label: Strange Fruit
- Producer: Tony Wilson

Joy Division chronology
The Peel Sessions (1986)	The Peel Sessions (1987)	Substance (1988)

Professional ratings
Review scores
Source	Rating
AllMusic	3/5 stars

The second EP, also titled The Peel Sessions, was released in 1987 by Strange Fruit. It features the recordings made for John Peel's show broadcast on 10 December 1979; it was recorded at the BBC Studios in Maida Vale, London, England on 26 November 1979. None of the songs had been released prior to the broadcast.

The EP spent 17 weeks on the UK Indie Chart, peaking at number 3.

==== Track listing ====
All tracks are written by Joy Division.

Side A
No.	Title	Length
1.	"Love Will Tear Us Apart"	3:20
2.	"24 Hours"	4:05

Side B
No.	Title	Length
1.	"Colony"	4:08
2.	"Sound of Music"	4:20

=== Peel Sessions compilation (1990) ===
Peel Sessions

Compilation album by Joy Division
- Released: September 1990
- Recorded: 31 January & 26 November 1979
- Length: 30:15
- Label: Strange Fruit
- Producer: John Peel; Joy Division

Joy Division chronology
Substance (1988)	Peel Sessions (1990)	Warsaw (1994)

Professional ratings
Review scores
Source	Rating
AllMusic	3/5 stars

A compilation of both EPs, Peel Sessions, was released in 1990 by Strange Fruit.

The US cover does not have the famous "Tube" photo by Anton Corbijn. There is also a French release which has a different cover.

==== Track listing ====
All tracks are written by Joy Division.

No.	Title	Length
1.	"Exercise One"	2:30
2.	"Insight"	3:55
3.	"She's Lost Control"	4:10
4.	"Transmission"	3:55
5.	"Love Will Tear Us Apart"	3:20
6.	"24 Hours"	4:05
7.	"Colony"	4:00
8.	"Sound of Music"	4:20

=== Personnel ===
Personnel adapted from The Peel Sessions liner notes.

Joy Division

- Peter Hook – bass, vocals, guitar
- Ian Curtis – vocals, guitar
- Bernard Sumner (credited as Bernard Dicken) – guitar, synthesiser, bass
- Stephen Morris – drums

Technical personnel

- Bob Sargeant – production
- Bob Jones – engineering
