= Love Will Tear Us Apart =

1980 single by Joy Division

- 7-inch cover

Single by Joy Division
- B-side: "These Days"
- Released: June 1980
- Recorded: March 1980
- Studio: Strawberry (Stockport, England)
- Genre: Post-punk; new wave
- Length: 3:18
- Label: Factory
- Songwriters: Ian Curtis; Peter Hook; Stephen Morris; Bernard Sumner
- Producers: Martin Hannett; Joy Division

Joy Division British singles and EPs singles chronology
"Komakino" (1980)	"Love Will Tear Us Apart" (1980)	"Atmosphere" (1980)

Alternative cover
- 12-inch cover

Music video
- "Love Will Tear Us Apart" on YouTube

"Love Will Tear Us Apart" is a song by the English rock band Joy Division, released in June 1980 as a non-album single. Its lyrics were inspired by lead singer Ian Curtis' marital problems and struggles with epilepsy. The single was released one month after Curtis' suicide.

"Love Will Tear Us Apart" reached number one in New Zealand and was certified double platinum in the United Kingdom, selling and streaming over 1,200,000 units. The song has an ongoing legacy as a defining song of the era. In 2002, NME named "Love Will Tear Us Apart" as the greatest single of all time, while Rolling Stone named it one of the 500 greatest songs ever in 2004, 2010, and 2021.

== Background ==
"Love Will Tear Us Apart" was written about Ian Curtis' troubled relationship with his wife, Deborah Woodruff, whom he married in August 1975. Additionally, it deals with his own struggles with epilepsy, which he was diagnosed with in 1979, and the overwhelming stress of holding down a day job and his growing career as a singer.

At a Joy Division gig in October 1979, Curtis met Belgian journalist and music promoter Annik Honoré and the two began a relationship; this caused further distress between Curtis and Woodruff.

Speaking about her relationship with Curtis in a 2010 interview with Belgian magazine supplement Focus, Honoré said:

It was a completely pure and platonic relationship, very childish, very chaste... I did not have a sexual relationship with Ian. He was on medication, which rendered it a nonphysical relationship. I am so fed up that people question my word or his. People can say whatever they want, but I am the only person to have his letters... One of his letters says that the relationship with his wife Deborah had already finished prior to us meeting each other.

According to drummer Stephen Morris:

When we were doing "Love Will Tear Us Apart" there were two records we were into: Frank Sinatra's Greatest Hits and "Number One Song in Heaven" by Sparks. That was the beginning of getting interested in Giorgio Moroder. Especially "I Feel Love". There was another one, ["I Lost My Heart to a Starship Trooper"]: I remember going in a transit van to King's Lynn with Ian and hearing it and saying, "It would be good to do one like this, wouldn't it?"

The title to the song can read like an ironic response to "Love Will Keep Us Together", a song whose version by Captain & Tennille was a hit in 1975. According to record producer Warren Huart, its intro was influenced directly by the Neu! song "Hero".

== Recording ==
Joy Division first recorded "Love Will Tear Us Apart" at Pennine Studios, Oldham, on 8 January 1980, along with the B-side, "These Days". This version was similar to the version the band played live. However, singer Ian Curtis and producer Martin Hannett disliked the results and the band reconvened in March at Strawberry Studios, Stockport (where the Neil Sedaka song "Love Will Keep Us Together" had been recorded in 1973), to re-record it. Each instrument was recorded separately. As Morris recalled:

Martin Hannett played one of his mind games when we were recording it – it sounds like he was a tyrant, but he wasn't, he was nice. We had this one battle where it was nearly midnight and I said, "Is it all right if I go home, Martin – it's been a long day?" And he said [whispers], "OK ... you go home". So I went back to the flat. Just got to sleep and the phone rings. "Martin wants you to come back and do the snare drum". At four in the morning! I said, "What's wrong with the snare drum!?" So every time I hear "Love Will Tear Us Apart", I grit my teeth and remember myself shouting down the phone, "YOU BASTARD!" ... I can feel the anger in it even now. It's a great song and it's a great production, but I do get anguished every time I hear it.

Though guitarist Bernard Sumner played guitar on the song, the band convinced Curtis to play Sumner's part live. According to Sumner, "We showed [Ian] how to play D and we wrote a song. I wonder if that's why we wrote 'Love Will Tear Us Apart', you could drone a D through it. I think he played it live because I was playing keyboards." The guitar heard on the recording was a 12-string Eko.

Curtis' singing style on the later version of the song is an imitation of Frank Sinatra, after Factory Records owner Tony Wilson had given him a record of the singer to use as a model. As Hannett felt this was a special song, he kept remixing it, even as many as 15 times.

While Joy Division were recording, U2 were in the studio to see Hannett about producing their single "11 O'Clock Tick Tock". U2 singer Bono said of the encounter:

Talking to Ian Curtis is ... or was a strange experience because he's very warm ... he talked — it was like two people inside of him — he talked very light, and he talked very well-mannered, and very polite. But when he got behind the microphone he really surged forth; there was another energy. It seemed like he was just two people and, you know, "Love Will Tear Us Apart", it was like [when] that record was released ... it was like, as if, there were the personalities, separate; there they were, torn apart.

== Releases ==
It was first recorded for a John Peel session in November 1979, then re-recorded in January and March 1980. It is the latter version that appears on the 1988 Substance album. The January 1980 version, which has become known as the "Pennine version", originally appeared as one of the single's B-sides.

"Love Will Tear Us Apart" became Joy Division's first chart hit, reaching number 13 in the UK Singles Chart. The following month, the single topped the UK Indie Chart. The song also peaked at number 42 on the Billboard disco chart in October 1980. "Love Will Tear Us Apart" also reached number 1 in New Zealand in June 1981.

The single was re-released in 1983 and reached number 19 on the UK charts and number 3 in New Zealand during March 1984. In 1985, the 7-inch single was released in Poland by Tonpress in different sleeve under licence from Factory and sold over 20,000 copies. In November 1988, it made one more Top 40 appearance in New Zealand, peaking at number 39.

== Cover photo ==
According to Curtis's wife Deborah, to create the single cover photo, which was made by Trevor Key, the song title was etched upon a sheet of metal; this was aged with acid and exposed to the weather to create the appearance of a stone slab. For the 12-inch version of the single, a photograph of a grieving angel on the Ribaudo family tomb in Genoa's Monumental Cemetery of Staglieno (sculpted by Onorato Toso c. 1910) was used. The photograph was taken by Bernard Pierre Wolff in 1978.

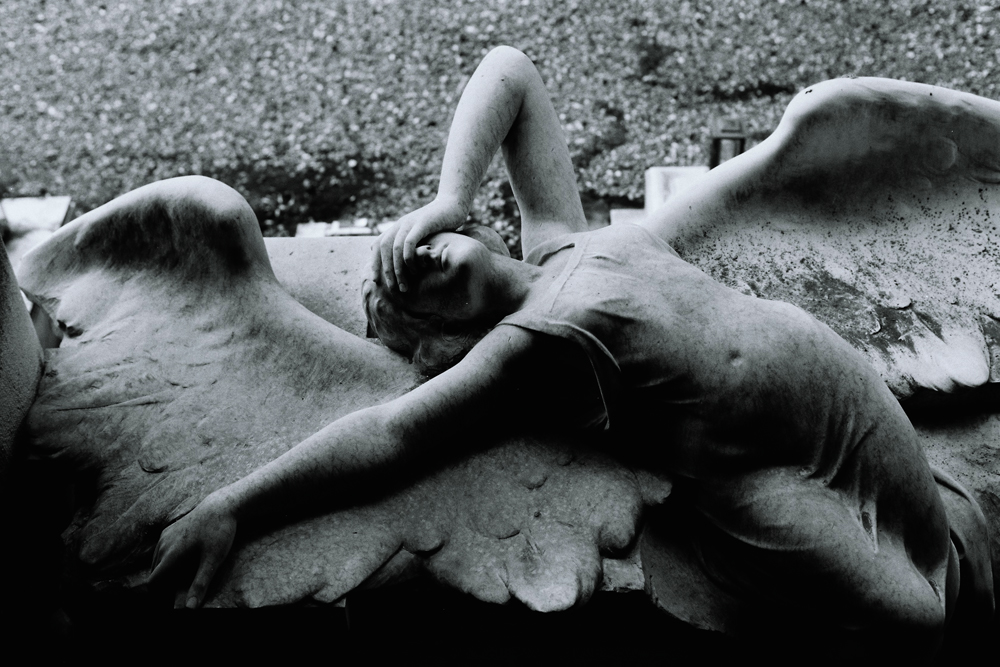
The Ribaudo tomb

The single Love Will...

== Music video ==
The video was shot by the band themselves on 25 April 1980 as they rehearsed the song at T. J. Davidson's studio, in Knott Mill, Manchester city centre, where the band had previously rehearsed during the early days of their career. At the start of the video, the door that opens and closes is carved with Ian Curtis' name; this was reportedly the beginning of an abusive message (the rest later erased) carved into the door.

Due to poor production, the video's colour is "browned out" at some points. Also, as the track recorded during the recording of the video was poor, it was replaced with the single-edit recording of the song by the band's record company in Australia, leading to problems with the synchronisation of music and video. This edited version of the music video would later become the official version due to the improvement of sound quality. The audio issue would be fixed in the 1995 remaster.

This was the only promotional video the band ever produced, as Curtis committed suicide three weeks after the video was recorded.

== Legacy ==
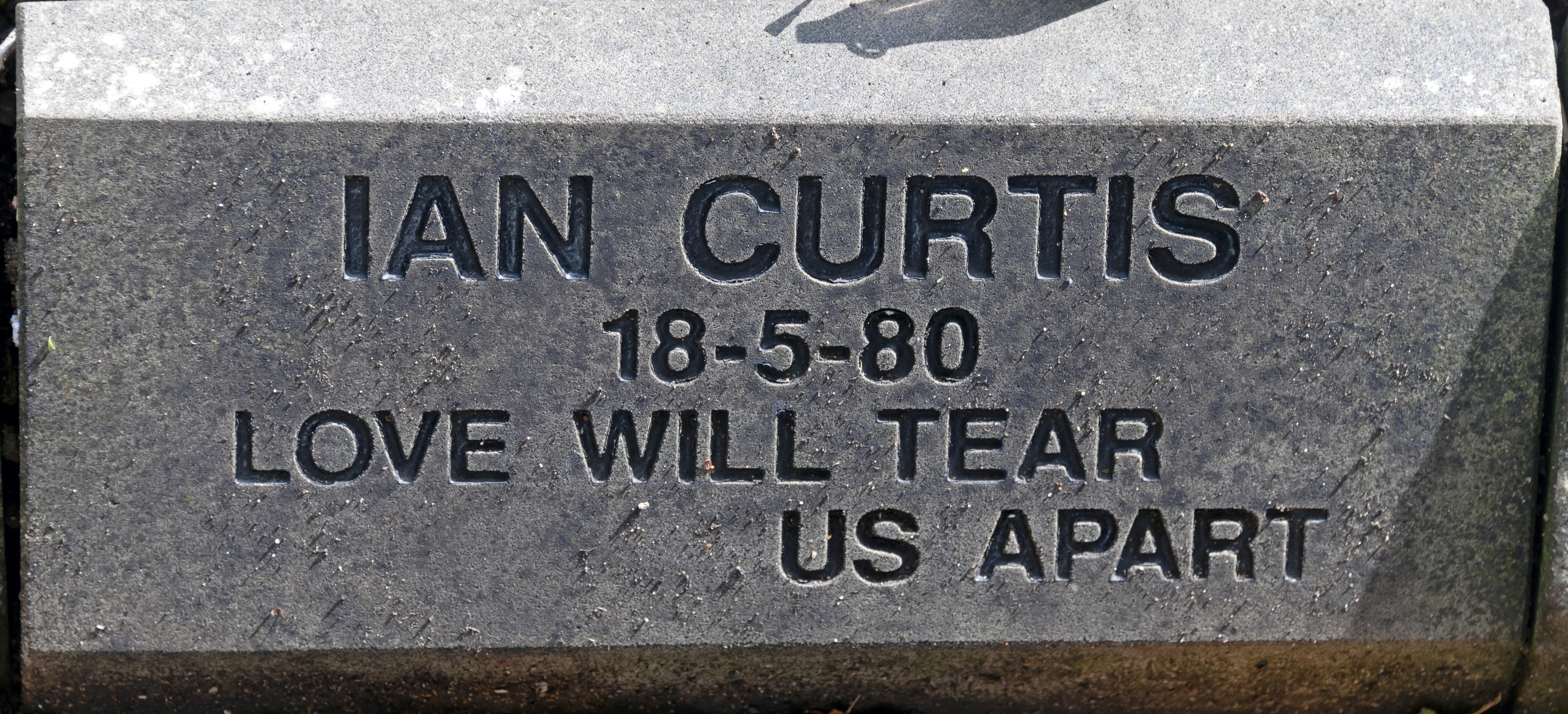
Ian Curtis's grave marker at Macclesfield Cemetery

The song was named NME Single of the Year in 1980, and was listed as the best single of all time by NME in 2002.

In May 2007, NME placed it at number 19 in its list of the 50 Greatest Indie Anthems Ever, one place ahead of another Joy Division song, "Transmission". The song is also listed as being one of the 5 best indie songs of all time in the "All Time Indie Top 50".

In 2004, the song was listed by Rolling Stone magazine at number 179 in its list of the "500 Greatest Songs of All Time". In 2011, the song was listed at number 181. In the 2021 update of the list, it had risen to 41.

The song reached number 1 in the inaugural Triple J Hottest 100 music poll of 1989 and again in 1990. When being interviewed for New Order Story, Neil Tennant of the Pet Shop Boys stated that "Love Will Tear Us Apart" was his favourite pop song of all time. At Christmas 2011, listeners of Dublin's Phantom FM voted "Love Will Tear Us Apart" as their favourite song of all time. Furthermore, in 2012, in celebration of the NME's 60th anniversary, a list of the 100 Greatest Songs of NME's Lifetime was compiled, and the list was topped by "Love Will Tear Us Apart". Serbian rock musician, journalist and writer Dejan Cukić wrote about "Love Will Tear Us Apart" as one of the 45 songs that changed history of popular music in his 2007 book 45 obrtaja: Priče o pesmama. In 2015, the online magazine Pitchfork ranked "Love Will Tear Us Apart" seventh on its list of the "200 best songs of the 1980s".

Following Curtis's suicide, his wife Deborah had the phrase "Love Will Tear Us Apart" inscribed on his memorial stone at Macclesfield Cemetery. The current grave marker was laid in 2008 to replace a similarly inscribed one stolen earlier that year.

In June 2013, Mighty Box Games released Will Love Tear Us Apart?, a browser-based video game that adapts every verse of the song into a level.

== Influence ==
The song made a strong impression on songwriter and former Graduate frontman Roland Orzabal; it also inspired him to write more introspective and personal songs that would appear on Tears for Fears' 1983 debut album The Hurting.

== Track listing ==
Side A
No.	Title	Length
1.	"Love Will Tear Us Apart"	3:18

Side B
No.	Title	Length
1.	"These Days"	3:21
2.	"Love Will Tear Us Apart (Pennine version) (Note: Not listed on original 7-inch single and not listed as being alternate version where it was; the "Pennine version" label did not come into use until years later.)"	3:06

1995 cassette edition
No.	Title	Length
1.	"Love Will Tear Us Apart" (radio version)	3:38
2.	"Love Will Tear Us Apart" (original version)	3:25

1995 12-inch edition
No.	Title	Length
1.	"Love Will Tear Us Apart" (original version)	3:25
2.	"Love Will Tear Us Apart" (radio version)	3:38
3.	"Love Will Tear Us Apart" (Arthur Baker remix)	4:12
4.	"Atmosphere" (original Hannett 12-inch)	4:08

1995 CD 1 edition
No.	Title	Length
1.	"Love Will Tear Us Apart" (radio version)	3:38
2.	"Love Will Tear Us Apart" (original version)	3:25
3.	"These Days"	3:25
4.	"Transmission" (live)	3:44

1995 CD 2 edition
No.	Title	Length
1.	"Love Will Tear Us Apart" (original version)	3:18
2.	"Love Will Tear Us Apart '95" (radio version)	3:38
3.	"Atmosphere"	4:08

- Track 1 recorded at Strawberry Studios, Stockport, early March 1980.
- Tracks 2 and 3 recorded at Pennine Sound Studios, Oldham, 8 January 1980.
- In her biography Touching from a Distance, Deborah Curtis explains that the reason for the two versions of the song, one on each side, was a result of Curtis's slightly different singing in each one; one vocal take was allegedly done when other band members told Curtis to sing "like Frank Sinatra".
- Like other Joy Division releases, including Transmission and An Ideal For Living, the 7-inch and 12-inch versions share the same tracks, but have different sleeves.

== Charts ==
=== Weekly charts ===
1980–1981 chart performance for "Love Will Tear Us Apart"
Chart (1980–1981)	Peak position
Australia (Kent Music Report)	26
New Zealand (Recorded Music NZ)	1
UK Singles (Official Charts)	13
UK Indie Chart	1
US Billboard Disco Top 100	42

1983–1984 chart performance for "Love Will Tear Us Apart"
Chart (1983–1984)	Peak position
Ireland (IRMA)	19
New Zealand (Recorded Music NZ)	3
UK Singles (Official Charts)	19

1988 chart performance for "Love Will Tear Us Apart"
Chart (1988)	Peak position
New Zealand (Recorded Music NZ)	39

1995 chart performance for "Love Will Tear Us Apart"
Chart (1995)	Peak position
UK Singles (Official Charts)	19

2007 chart performance for "Love Will Tear Us Apart"
Chart (2007)	Peak position
UK Singles (Official Charts)	46

=== Year-end charts ===
1981 year-end chart performance for "Love Will Tear Us Apart"
Chart (1981)	Position
New Zealand (RIANZ)	19

1984 year-end chart performance for "Love Will Tear Us Apart"
Chart (1984)	Position
New Zealand (RIANZ)	48

== Certifications ==
Sale certifications for "Love Will Tear Us Apart"
Region	Certification	Certified units/sales
Italy (FIMI)	Gold	25,000^{‡}
Spain (Promusicae)	Gold	30,000^{‡}
United Kingdom (BPI)	2× Platinum	1,200,000^{‡}
^{‡} Sales+streaming figures based on certification alone.

== Cover versions ==
Love Will Tear Us Apart

EP by Swans
- Released: 1988
- Length: 16:56
- Label: Product Inc.
- Producer: Michael Gira

Swans chronology
Children of God (1987)	Love Will Tear Us Apart (1988)	Feel Good Now (1988)

Throughout the 1980s, multiple artists covered "Love Will Tear Us Apart". Chuzpe recorded a cover version that peaked at number eight in Austria in 1981. Paul Young's 1984 cover of the song, from his debut studio album No Parlez, reached number nine in both the Belgium and Netherlands, and number 40 in Germany. The New York band Swans' fourth EP Love Will Tear Us Apart was named after their cover of the song, and was placed alongside two semi-acoustic versions of songs from their 1987 LP Children of God. The EP reached number 85 on the UK Singles Chart and number two on the UK Indie Chart. In May 2005, ambient dance duo Honeyroot reached number 70 on the UK Singles Chart in May 2005 with their cover.

In 2002, on his album Do You Know Squarepusher, artist Squarepusher covered the track, which was released on electronic independent label Warp Records.

In 2004 the band Fall Out Boy included an acoustic cover of this song on their EP My Heart Will Always Be the B-Side to My Tongue.

In 2011 the British acid-house blues band Alabama 3 made a cover of the song for their album There Will Be Peace in the Valley... When We Get the Keys to the Mansion on the Hill.

U2 have often included the song in their live set; it has also been frequently performed live by the Irish band Inhaler.

In 2020 New Zealand progressive metal band City of Souls released their cover of "Love Will Tear Us Apart" (stylized as L|W|T|U|A) on their debut album, SYNÆSTHESIA.

In 2021, English producer and member of the electronic band Faithless, Rollo Armstrong (under the alias R Plus), released a cover version of "Love Will Tear Us Apart", featuring vocals from Amelia Fox.

On 24 December 2023, Noel Gallagher's High Flying Birds released a demo version of their cover of the track.

In November 2024, PJ Harvey released a cover of the song for the Apple TV+ series Bad Sisters.

== See also ==
- Joy Division discography
- List of number-one singles from the 1980s (New Zealand)
