= Komakino =

Song by Joy Division

Single by Joy Division
- B-side: "Incubation"; "As You Said"
- Released: 20 June 1980
- Recorded: 18–30 March 1980 at Britannia Row Studios, London, England
- Genre: Post-punk
- Length: 3:40
- Label: Factory
- Songwriter(s): Ian Curtis; Peter Hook; Stephen Morris; Bernard Sumner
- Producer(s): Martin Hannett

Joy Division singles chronology
"Licht und Blindheit" (1980)	"Komakino" (1980)	"Love Will Tear Us Apart" (1980)

"Komakino" is a June 1980 single by the English post-punk band Joy Division. Like "Dead Souls" and "Transmission", the song was written between their first album Unknown Pleasures (1979) and second, final album Closer (1980).

== Release ==
"Komakino" was released by Factory Records as a 7 in (180 mm) flexi disc given away in select record shops. 50,000 copies were distributed in total, with the first 25,000 released on 20 June 1980, and an additional 25,000 on 14 November 1980. The single's B-sides, "Incubation" and "As You Said", are both instrumentals. The single was intended to be a free extra bundled with copies of Closer, but record stores would sell them separately. Reflecting on this, bassist Peter Hook stated: "The idea was, you’d buy Closer and get the flexi disc free, but the record stores didn’t like that. So they decided to sell the flexi discs. People bought the album, but the stores would still charge customers 50p extra or whatever for the flexi, the rotten devils."

"Komakino" and "Incubation" appear on the 1988 compilation Substance; "As You Said" was later added in its 2015 expanded reissue. The latter was also featured on the B-side of New Order's Video 586 single. The three tracks are collected on the 4-CD 1997 compilation Heart and Soul.

== Track listing ==
All tracks are written by Joy Division (Ian Curtis, Peter Hook, Stephen Morris and Bernard Sumner).

Side A
No.	Title	Length
1.	"Komakino"	3:40

Side B
No.	Title	Length
1.	"Incubation"	2:50
2.	"As You Said"	1:55
