= Boots for Dancing =

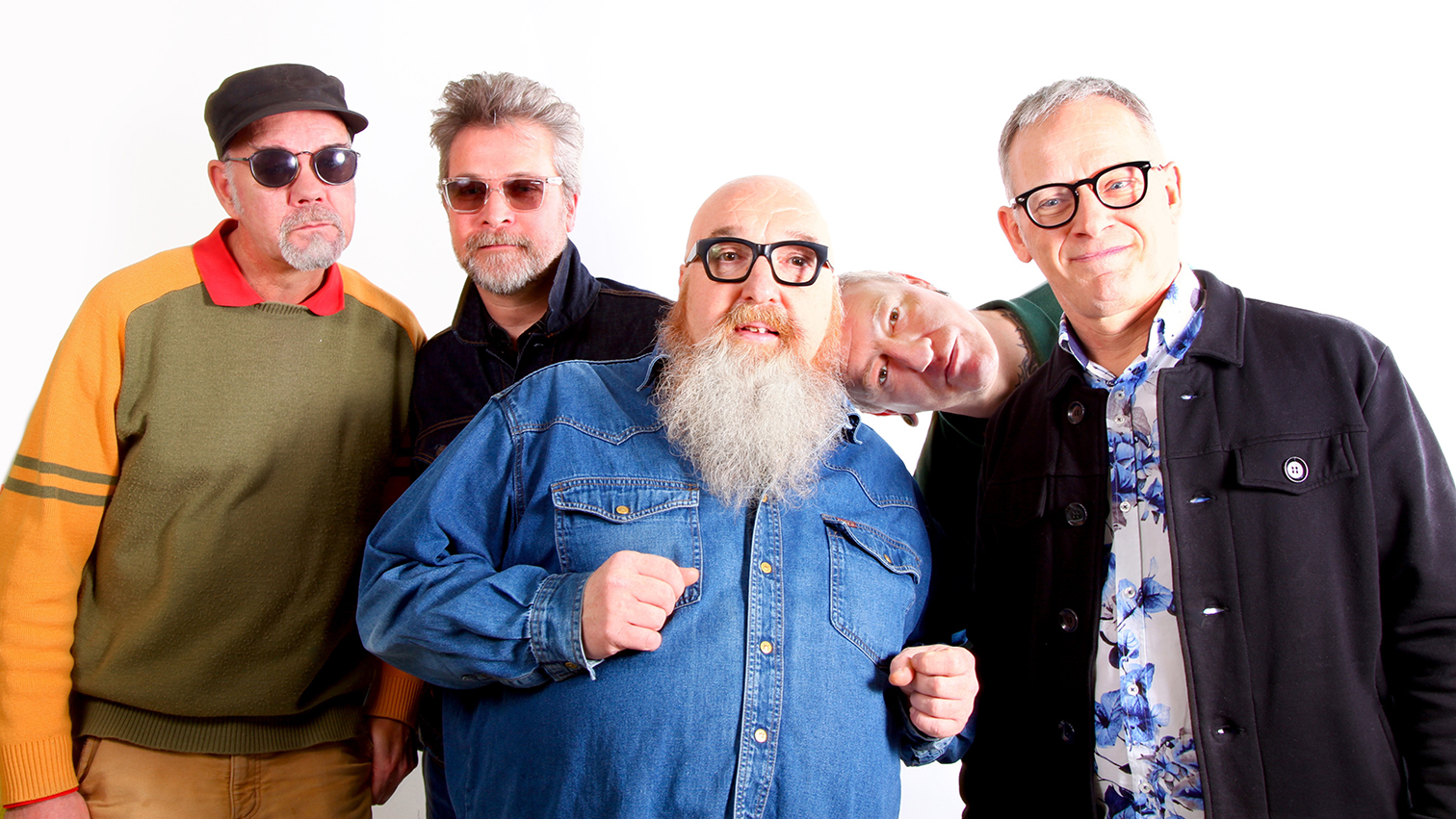
- The band in 2017

Background information
- Origin: Edinburgh, Scotland
- Genres: Post-punk
- Years active: 1979–1982, 2015-
- Labels: Pop Aural, Re-Pop-X
- Members: Dancin' Dave Carson, Michael Barclay, Russell Burn, Colin J. Whitson, Gavin Fraser
- Past members: Dave Carson, Graeme High, Dougie Barrie, Stuart Wright, Angel Paterson, Jamo Stewart, Dickie Fusco, Mike Barclay, Jo Callis, Simon Templar (Bloomfield), Ronnie Torrance
- Website: www.facebook.com/bootsfordancing/

Boots for Dancing are a post-punk band from Edinburgh, Scotland, active between 1979 and 1982. They reformed in 2015.

== History ==
The band was formed in late 1979 by Dave Carson (vocals), Graeme High (guitar), Dougie Barrie (bass), and Stuart Wright (drums). Showing influences from the likes of Gang of Four and The Pop Group, they signed to the Pop Aural label for their eponymous debut single, receiving airplay from John Peel. In the next two years, the band had more line-up changes than releases, first with ex-Shake and Rezillos drummer Angel Paterson replacing Wright, to be replaced himself by Jamo Stewart and Dickie Fusco. Former Thursdays guitarist Mike Barclay then replaced High, who joined Delta 5. The band also added ex-Shake/Rezillos guitarist Jo Callis for second single "Rain Song", issued in March 1981. Callis then left to join The Human League, with no further line-up changes before third single "Ooh Bop Sh'Bam" was released in early 1982. Barrie then departed, his replacement being ex-Flowers/Shake/Rezillos bassist Simon Templar (b. Bloomfield), and ex-Josef K drummer Ronnie Torrance replaced the departing Fusco and Stewart (the latter forming The Syndicate). The band split up later in 1982.

Between line-up changes, the band recorded two sessions for John Peel's BBC radio show, in 1980 and 1981. In 2015 they reformed and released The Undisco Kidds, an album of recordings from the 1980s.

== Discography ==
- "Shadows in Stone" and "Ooh Bob Sahbam" on 12" Album "Scottish Kultchur" (1979) Pinnacle
- "Boots for Dancing/Parachute/Guitars & Girl Trouble" 12" EP (1980) Pop Aural (UK Indie No. 42)
- "Rain Song" 7" (1981) Pop Aural
- "Ooh Bop Sh'Bam" 7" (1982) Re-Pop-X
- Undisco Kidds (2015) Athens of the North (AOTN LP 05)
