= She's Lost Control =

Song by Joy Division

Song by Joy Division

from the album Unknown Pleasures
- Released: 15 June 1979
- Recorded: 1–17 April 1979
- Studio: Strawberry, Stockport
- Genre: Post-punk; mutant disco
- Length: 3:57
- Label: Factory
- Songwriters: Bernard Sumner; Peter Hook; Stephen Morris; Ian Curtis
- Producers: Martin Hannett, Joy Division

"She's Lost Control"

Single by Joy Division
- B-side: "Atmosphere"
- Released: August 1980 (US)
- Recorded: March 1980
- Length: 4:56
- Label: Factory
- Songwriter: Joy Division
- Producer: Martin Hannett

Joy Division singles and EPs singles chronology
| "Komakino" (1980) | "Atmosphere" / "She's Lost Control" (1980) | "'The Peel Sessions'" (1986) |

"She's Lost Control" is a song by the English rock band Joy Division. Released on their 1979 debut album, Unknown Pleasures, "She's Lost Control" was first performed live by the band in June 1978 and draws primary lyrical inspiration from a young woman experiencing a violent epileptic seizure.

Two separate recordings of the song have been released: the version appearing on the band's debut album, and an extended, more electronic version released in 1980 as a 12" single. This 12" single version contains an additional verse not present on the initial version of the song, and was recorded in March 1980 at Strawberry Studios, Stockport, making this song one of the band's last studio recordings prior to the May 1980 suicide of their lead singer, Ian Curtis. On the US release of the 12" single, "She's Lost Control" appeared as the A-side (with "Atmosphere" as the B-side), as opposed the UK version, where the song appeared as the B-side to "Atmosphere".

== Lyrics ==
Curtis primarily drew the lyrical inspiration for "She's Lost Control" from a young woman with whom he had become acquainted through his employment as an Assistant Disablement Resettlement Officer at a Macclesfield occupational rehabilitation centre between 1978 and 1979. The woman had epilepsy and had been desperate to find employment, yet she suffered seizures whenever she came to the exchange, which would greatly disturb Curtis, who himself suffered from epilepsy. At one stage, this young woman ceased attending her appointments at the occupational rehabilitation centre. Initially, Curtis assumed she had found a job, but he would later discover she had died of an epileptic seizure. (Note: Curtis would later inform his wife he had been informed this woman had choked to death in her sleep as a result of an epileptic seizure. Consequently, one of Ian Curtis' greatest fears was dying in his sleep as a result of an epileptic seizure. Due to this fear, he and his wife would establish a ritual whereby, upon evenings following a Joy Division gig in which Curtis did not experience an epileptic seizure, Ian would either sit in a chair and wait for an epileptic seizure to occur in his wife's presence, or lie in bed with his wife as both listened in silence, to await a change in his breathing rhythm (which would signal an impending seizure), in order that his wife could help him, before he would sleep.)

The woman's unexpected death and Curtis' subsequent awareness and experiences of the stigma endured by individuals suffering from neurological impairments formed the lyrical inspiration for the song.

The hand-written lyrics were included in the new British Pop Archive, housed in Manchester's John Rylands Library, in 2022.

== Composition ==
The composition of "She's Lost Control" centres upon Peter Hook's bassline, played high up on the neck, and a mechanistic drum beat played by Stephen Morris. For the song's recording, each drum was recorded completely separately, as producer Martin Hannett obsessively pursued clean drum sounds with no "bleed through" (when one drum's sound is added to the signal of another drum unintentionally) on songs he considered potential singles.

Live, this song would be played at a faster pace than that upon the album, and much more aggressively, with Curtis often shouting the lyrics before the bridge sections. The Synare used upon live performances of this song would often be more abrasive and louder in the mix than was used in the studio recordings. On later live recordings, Curtis would play a keyboard line during the coda, one of only a few songs on which he would play an instrument.

== Music video ==
An official music video was directed by Lorraine Nicholson and produced by Company 3.

== Live versions ==
A number of live versions of the song appear on re-issues of the band's albums. In addition, the 2008 compilation release, The Best of Joy Division, includes the Peel session the band had recorded of this song in January 1979.

== Cover versions ==
Many indie bands and artists have since covered "She's Lost Control". These artists include Girls Against Boys, Siobhan Fahey, Grace Jones and Spoek Mathambo. The bass riff for "She's Lost Control" was also sampled in 1993 by the Manchester electronic music group 808 State for their single "Contrique".

== In popular culture ==
A very loose cover version of the song, recorded by the Greek minimal wave band Alive She Died, featured prominently in a 2016 advertising campaign for the cruise/resort collection of the Italian fashion house, Gucci.

The 2002 film 24 Hour Party People includes a scene dramatizing the recording of the song, and suggests that Morris recorded the drum beat on the roof of the studio, as well as continuing to play the beat long after the other band members had left the studio.

The name of the song is referenced in the title of the 2007 Ian Curtis biopic Control, which includes the incident which inspired the song, and also the actual recording of the song. This later scene depicts drummer Stephen Morris using an aerosol can sprayed into a microphone as percussion.

== Track listing ==
Side A
| No. | Title | Length |
|---|---|---|
| 1. | "She's Lost Control" | 4:45 |

Side B
| No. | Title | Length |
|---|---|---|
| 1. | "Atmosphere" | 4:10 |
