= Section 25 discography =

- Studio albums: 9
- EPs: 2
- Live albums: 5
- Compilation albums: 4
- Singles: 11
- Video albums: 2
- Box sets: 1
- Remix albums: 1

This is the discography of English post-punk and electronic band Section 25.

== Albums ==
=== Studio albums ===
| Title | Album details | Peak chart positions |
| Title | Album details | UK Indie |
|---|---|---|
| Always Now | Released: September 1981; Label: Factory; Formats: LP | 13 |
| The Key of Dreams | Released: May 1982; Label: Factory Benelux; Formats: LP | — |
| From the Hip | Released: March 1984; Label: Factory; Formats: LP, MC | 7 |
| Love & Hate | Released: March 1988; Label: Factory; Formats: LP | — |
| Part-Primitiv | Released: May 2007; Label: LTM; Formats: CD | — |
| Nature + Degree | Released: June 2009; Label: LTM; Formats: CD | — |
| Retrofit | Released: 27 September 2010; Label: LTM; Formats: CD, digital download | — |
| Dark Light | Released: 25 February 2013; Label: Factory Benelux; Formats: CD, digital download | — |
| Elektra | Released: 10 July 2018; Label: Klanggalerie; Formats: CD, digital download | — |
"—" denotes releases that did not chart or were not released in that territory.

=== Live albums ===
| Title | Album details |
|---|---|
| Live in America & Europe 1982 | Released: 1998; Label: LTM; Formats: CD |
| From the Hip – In the Flesh – Live in America 1985 | Released: October 2001; Label: LTM; Formats: CD |
| SXXV:XXX | Released: 2008; Label: Self-released; Formats: CD+digital download |
| Alfresco | Released: 18 April 2016; Label: Factory Benelux; Formats: LP+CD |
| Duette – Live in Vienna | Released: 17 April 2020; Label: Klanggalerie; Formats: CD, digital download |

=== Remix albums ===
| Title | Album details |
|---|---|
| Eigengrau | Released: 2 July 2013; Label: Klanggalerie; Formats: CD, digital download |

=== Compilation albums ===
| Title | Album details |
|---|---|
| Illuminous Illuminae | Released: 1982; Label: Relevant Music; Formats: MC; Limited release; collection of demo, live and other material |
| Deus Ex Machina – Archive Recordings 1983–1985 | Released: 1998; Label: LTM; Formats: CD; Limited release |
| Dirty Disco (Best Of) | Released: February 2008; Label: LTM; Formats: CD |
| Jams from the Bardo | Released: 8 July 2021; Label: Klanggalerie; Formats: CD, digital download |

=== Box sets ===
| Title | Album details |
|---|---|
| Always Now | Released: August 2019; Label: Factory Benelux; Formats: 5xLP |

=== Video albums ===
| Title | Album details |
|---|---|
| So Far – An Audiovisual History 1980–85 | Released: 14 February 2005; Label: LTM; Formats: DVD |
| Communicants | Released: 1 May 2007; Label: LTM; Formats: DVD |

== EPs ==
| Title | Album details |
|---|---|
| Section 25 / Stereograph | Released: 31 October 2012; Label: Phaneron; Formats: 12"; US-only limited release; split EP with Stereograph |
| Invicta Max | Released: 28 June 2013; Label: Minimal Maximal; Formats: 10"; Belgium-only limited release |

== Singles ==
| Title | Year | Peak chart positions |
| Title | Year | UK Indie |
|---|---|---|
| "Girls Don't Count" | 1980 | 28 |
| "Charnel Ground" (Belgium-only release) | 1980 | 33 |
| "Je veux ton amour" (Belgium-only release) | 1981 | — |
| "The Beast" | 1982 | — |
| "Back to Wonder" | 1983 | — |
| "Looking from a Hilltop" | 1984 | 31 |
| "Crazy Wisdom" (Belgium-only release) | 1985 | 23 |
| "Bad News Week" | 1987 | 35 |
| "My Outrage" | 2013 | — |
| "Reflection" | 2014 | — |
| "Mirror" | 2015 | — |
"—" denotes releases that did not chart or were not released in that territory.
