= Live (Mahogany Rush album) =

Live album by Mahogany Rush
- Released: March 1978
- Recorded: late 1977
- Venue: Southern United States
- Genre: Hard rock
- Length: 45:38; Expanded Edition: 60:40
- Label: CBS
- Producer: Frank Marino

Mahogany Rush chronology
Live (1978)	Double Live (1988)

Professional ratings
Review scores
Source	Rating
AllMusic	4/5 stars

Live is the first live album by Canadian hard rock band Mahogany Rush, originally released by Columbia Records in March 1978.

The album was originally released on the LP format. Later reissues of the album on the compact disc format have been expanded with bonus tracks.

== Track listing ==
All songs by Frank Marino, except where noted.

Side A

1. "Introduction" – 0:28
2. "The Answer" (from Mahogany Rush IV) – 5:01
3. "Dragonfly" (from Mahogany Rush IV) – 5:27
4. "I'm A King Bee" (Slim Harpo) - 5:57
5. "(Excerpt from 'Back Door Man')" (Willie Dixon) – 2:56
6. "A New Rock & Roll" (from Child of the Novelty) – 4:19

Side B

1. "Johnny B. Goode" (Chuck Berry) - 5:16
2. "Talkin' 'Bout a Feelin'" (from Child of the Novelty) - 3:58
3. "(Excerpt from 'Who Do Ya Love')" (Bo Diddley) - 1:32
4. "Electric Reflections of War" - 3:04
5. "The World Anthem" (from World Anthem) - 3:39
6. "Purple Haze" (Jimi Hendrix) - 4:01

Bonus tracks on Expanded Edition Bonus tracks are recorded at California Jam II.

1. "I'm A King Bee" (Slim Harpo) - 6:43
2. "Johnny B. Goode" (Chuck Berry) - 8:19

== Charts ==
Chart (1978)	Peak position
CAN RPM	67
US Billboard Top LPs & Tape	129

== Personnel ==
- Frank Marino - guitar, vocals
- Paul Harwood - bass guitar
- Jimmy Ayoub - drums and percussion
- "R2D2" - "backup"
