= Retrofit (disambiguation) =

To retrofit is to add new technology or features to older systems.

Retrofit may also refer to:

- Retrofit (album), a 2010 album by Section 25
- Retrofit, a 2004 album by Daryl Stuermer
- Retrofit (company), a weight loss company
- Retrofit Films, a production company
