= From the Hip =

From the Hip may refer to:

- From the Hip (Section 25 album), 1984
- "From the Hip" (song), a 1988 song by Lloyd Cole and the Commotions
- From the Hip (Frank Marino album), 1990
- From the Hip (film), a 1987 comedy film directed by Bob Clark
