= Eye of the Storm (Mahogany Rush album) =

Studio album by Frank Marino & Mahogany Rush
- Released: August 1, 2000
- Genre: Hard rock
- Length: 72:16
- Label: Griffin Records
- Producer: Frank Marino

Frank Marino & Mahogany Rush chronology
Dragonfly - The best of Frank Marino & Mahogany Rush (1997)	Eye of the Storm (2000)	Real Live! (2004)

Professional ratings
Review scores
Source	Rating
Allmusic	4/5 stars
Winnipeg Sun	3 stars

Eye of the Storm is a studio album by Frank Marino & Mahogany Rush. It was released on August 1, 2000, under Griffin Records.

It was the first release of new material by the group in ten years, and Marino had worked on the material for eight years. Marino said "Eye of the Storm is just like Maxoom, except that now I know what I'm doing."

== Track listing ==
All songs by Frank Marino.

1. "Storm Warning..." - 2:51
2. "Eye of the Storm" - 9:54
3. "He's Calling" - 10:21
4. "Learned My Lesson Well" - 5:46
5. "Heat of the Moment" - 11:21
6. "Window to the World" - 7:56
7. "Since You Came into My Life" - 5:31
8. "Avalon" - 7:47
9. "Ordinary Man" - 10:49

== Personnel ==
- Frank Marino – guitars, vocals, keyboards, timpani
- Mick Layne – rhythm guitar
- Peter Dowse – bass
- Dave Goode – drums, percussion

Additional personnel

- Billy Szawlowski, Frank Marino – engineers
