= Mona (I Need You Baby) =

Song written by Ellas McDaniel (Bo Diddley)

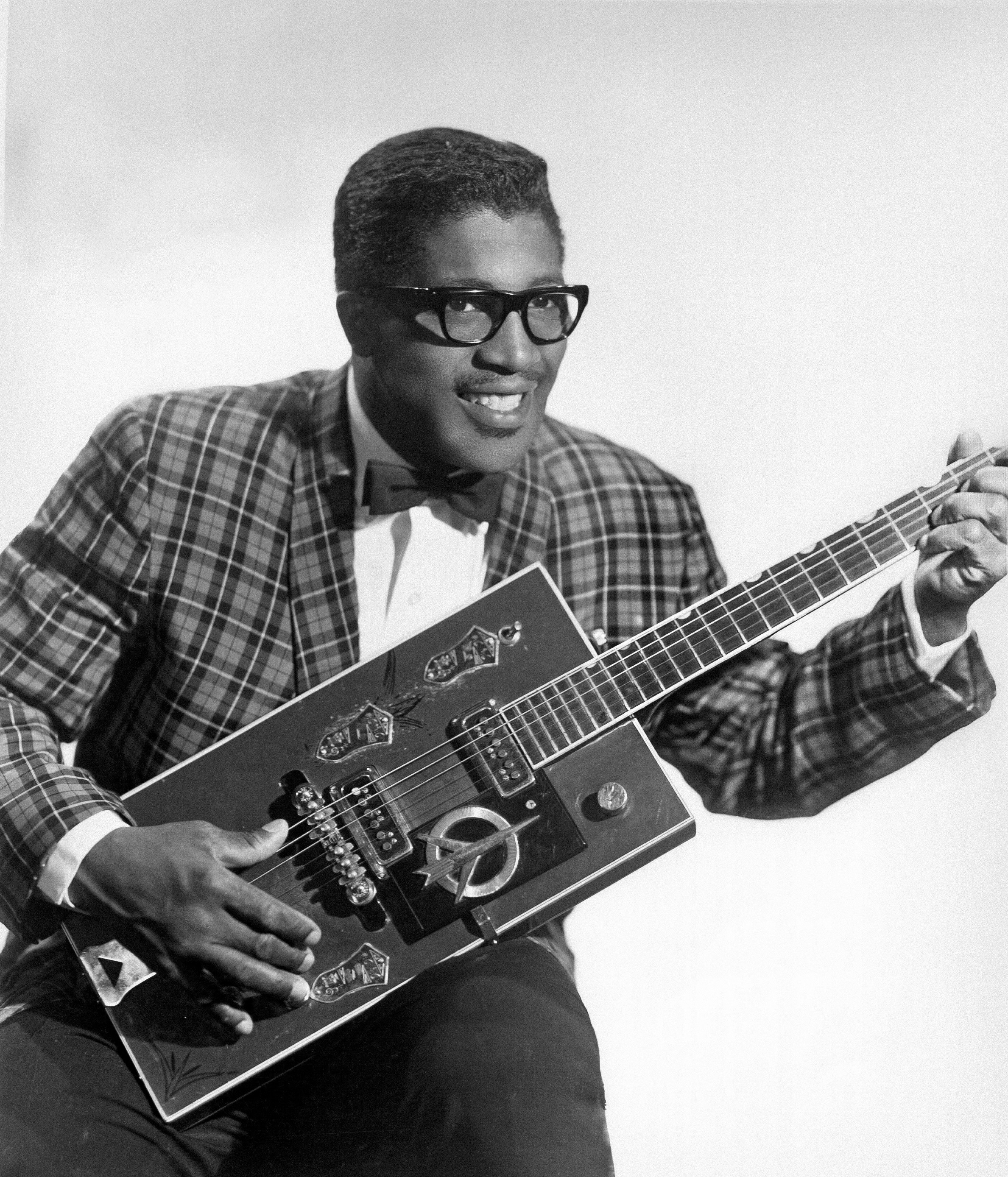
Bo Diddley, 1957

"Mona (I Need You Baby)" is a song written by Ellas McDaniel (Bo Diddley) that appeared as the B-side to his 1957 single "Hey! Bo Diddley". According to Diddley's obituary in The New York Times, "Mona" was a song of praise he wrote for a 45-year-old exotic dancer who worked at the Flame Show Bar in Detroit. The song also became the template for the Crickets's "Not Fade Away".

== Craig McLachlan & Check 1–2 version ==
"Mona"

Single by Craig McLachlan & Check 1–2

from the album Craig McLachlan & Check 1-2
- B-side: "I Don't Mind"
- Released: April 30, 1990
- Length: 3:40
- Label: CBS
- Songwriter: Ellas McDaniel
- Producer: Garth Porter

Craig McLachlan & Check 1–2 singles chronology
| "Rock the Rock" (1989) | "Mona" (1990) | "Amanda" (1990) |

In April 1990, Australian actor and musician Craig McLachlan released a version with his band, Check 1–2, as the second single from their 1990 debut album, Craig McLachlan & Check 1-2. It was a commercial success, peaking at No. 3 in Australia and No. 2 in the United Kingdom. In Australia, it was the highest-selling single by a native artist in 1990. At the ARIA Music Awards of 1991 it won ARIA Award for Highest-Selling Single.

=== Track listing ===
| No. | Title | Writer(s) | Length |
|---|---|---|---|
| 1. | "Mona" (7-inch version) | Ellas McDaniel | 3:40 |
| 2. | "Mona" (extended remix) | Ellas McDaniel | 6:52 |
| 3. | "I Don't Mind" | Craig McLachlan | 3:19 |

=== Charts ===
==== Weekly charts ====
| Chart (1990) | Peak position |
|---|---|
| Australia (ARIA) | 3 |
| Austria (Ö3 Austria Top 40) | 14 |
| Belgium (Ultratop 50 Flanders) | 8 |
| Europe (Eurochart Hot 100) | 3 |
| Germany (GfK) | 44 |
| Ireland (IRMA) | 5 |
| Netherlands (Dutch Top 40) | 21 |
| Netherlands (Single Top 100) | 26 |
| New Zealand (Recorded Music NZ) | 16 |
| UK Singles (Official Charts) | 2 |

==== Year-end charts ====
| Chart (1990) | Position |
|---|---|
| Australia (ARIA) | 15 |
| Belgium (Ultratop) | 65 |
| Europe (Eurochart Hot 100) | 86 |
| New Zealand (RIANZ) | 35 |
| UK Singles (OCC) | 22 |

=== Certifications ===
| Region | Certification | Certified units/sales |
|---|---|---|
| Australia (ARIA) | Platinum | 70,000^{^} |
^{^} Shipments figures based on certification alone.

== Other cover versions ==
- The Rolling Stones for their debut album in 1964 in the UK and on the US album The Rolling Stones, Now! in 1965.
- T. C. Atlantic with a regional hit single in 1966.
- The Troggs on their 1967 album Trogglodynamite.
- Quicksilver Messenger Service for their second album, 1969's Happy Trails. It was ranked number 88 on the 100 Greatest Guitar Songs of All Time by Rolling Stone.
- Yugoslav band Mladi recorded a cover version in the 1960s, but it remained unreleased until 2005, when it appeared on the box set Kad je rock bio mlad – Priče sa istočne strane (1956-1970) (When Rock Was Young – East Side Stories (1956-1970)), featuring songs by the pioneering Yugoslav rock acts.
- Grateful Dead performed the song twice – first with Bo Diddley on 25 March 1972 (released on Dick's Picks Volume 30) and then again on 27 October 1991 with guests Gary Duncan and Carlos Santana.
- The Roosters on their 1980 self-titled debut album.
- Frank Marino and Mahogany Rush covered "Mona" on their 1980 album What’s Next.
- Bruce Springsteen often interpolated "Mona" as an introduction to his "She's the One" on the Born to Run tours and Darkness Tour in the 1970s.
- Bo Diddley performed "Mona" with Tom Petty and the Heartbreakers on March 28, 1999, at the Fillmore West.
