= World Anthem =

Studio album by Mahogany Rush
- Released: 18 March 1977
- Recorded: December 1976 – February 1977
- Studio: Studio Tempo, Montreal
- Length: 45:22
- Label: Columbia
- Producer: Frank Marino

Mahogany Rush chronology
Mahogany Rush IV (1976)	World Anthem (1977)	Live (1978)

Professional ratings
Review scores
Source	Rating
Allmusic	2.5/5 stars

World Anthem is the fifth studio album by Canadian rock band Mahogany Rush, led by Frank Marino. It was released in 1977 on Columbia Records.

Covers of 3 of the songs on World Anthem, "In My Ways" (George Lynch), "The World Anthem" (James Byrd), and "Try For Freedom" (Ronnie Montrose), appear on the 2005 Secondhand Smoke - A Tribute to Frank Marino album. "World Anthem" is also covered by Japanese visual kei band X Japan in their second album "Blue Blood".

== Track listing ==
All songs written by Frank Marino.

1. "Requiem for a Sinner" - 6:01
2. "Hey Little Lover" - 4:51
3. "Broken Heart Blues" - 4:55
4. "In My Ways" - 6:13
5. "The World Anthem" - 3:09
6. "Look at Me" - 4:07
7. "Lady" - 4:38
8. "Try for Freedom" - 11:28

== Personnel ==
- Frank Marino - guitars, vocals, synthesizer, percussion, timpani
- Paul Harwood - bass guitars
- Jimmy Ayoub - drums and percussion
- Phil Bech - synthesizer solo on "Lady"

== Charts ==
Country	Date	Peak position
US	1977	184
