= Part-Primitiv =

Part Primitiv

Studio album by Section 25
- Released: June 2007
- Recorded: Preston and Poulton-le-Fylde, UK
- Genre: Alternative rock techno synthpop
- Length: 48:32
- Label: LTM
- Producer: Section 25

Section 25 chronology
Love & Hate (1988)	Part Primitiv (2007)

Professional ratings
Review scores
Source	Rating
Allmusic	4/5 stars
Brainwashed	not rated
Cerysmatic Factory	not rated

Part-Primitiv is a studio album by Section 25. It was released in June 2007 at West Orange studios in Preston. The two tracks featuring Jenny Ross, "Dream" and "Better Make Your Mind Up", were reworked versions of demos which had been recorded in the Temple of Din - a small home studio in Poulton-le-Fylde.

== Track listing ==
All songs written by Section 25.

1. "Winterland I" – 3:54
2. "Can't Let Go" – 5:06
3. "Poppy Fields" – 4:06
4. "She's So Pretty" – 3:39
5. "Dream" – 4:14
6. "Powerbase" – 4:17
7. "Roma" – 3:20
8. "Better Make Your Mind Up" – 4:04
9. "Gene" – 3:09
10. "Cry" – 3:12
11. "Ludus Cantus" – 2:17
12. "Nick" – 3:06
13. "Winterland II" – 4:08

== Personnel ==
Section 25

- Larry Cassidy - vocals, guitar
- Vin Cassidy - drums, electronics
- Jenny Ross - vocals
- Ian Butterworth - guitar, electronics
- Roger Wikeley - bass guitar, electronics, harmonica

Technical

- Alan Gregson - engineer, additional production
