= What's Next =

What's Next(?) may refer to:

- "What's Next", the official name for the Disney advertising slogan "I'm going to Disney World!"
- "What's Next" (Drake song)
- "What's Next" (Leaders of the New School song)
- "What's Next?" (Off! song)
- "What's Next?" (Godsmack song)
- "What's Next", song by Filter from the album Anthems for the Damned, 2008
- What's Next (album), a 1980 album by Frank Marino & Mahogany Rush
