= Strange Universe (album) =

Studio album by Mahogany Rush
- Released: 1975
- Recorded: Tempo Studios, Montreal, Quebec, Canada, 1975
- Genre: Hard rock; heavy metal; progressive rock; psychedelic rock; jazz rock
- Length: 42:34
- Label: Nine Records / 20th Century Fox Records
- Producer: Frank Marino

Mahogany Rush chronology
Child of the Novelty (1974)	Strange Universe (1975)	Mahogany Rush IV (1976)

Professional ratings
Review scores
Source	Rating
allmusic	4/5 stars

Strange Universe is the third studio album by Canadian rock band Mahogany Rush, led by Frank Marino. It was released in 1975.

== Track listing ==
All songs by Frank Marino.

1. "Tales of the Spanish Warrior" - 4:57
2. "The King Who Stole (...the Universe)" - 3:57
3. "Satisfy Your Soul" - 3:17
4. "Land of 1000 Nights" - 4:44
5. "Moonlight Lady" - 4:08
6. "Dancing Lady" - 3:11
7. "Once Again" - 3:34
8. "Tryin' Anyway" - 3:45
9. "Dear Music" - 4:19
10. "Strange Universe" - 6:58

== Personnel ==
- Frank Marino – guitars, vocals, drums on "Dear Music", synthesizer on "Strange Universe"
- Paul Harwood - bass guitars
- Jimmy Ayoub - drums and percussion

== Charts ==
Country	Date	Peak position
US	1975	84
