= The Zeta Project =

American animated television series

- Genre: Dramedy; Science fiction; Action; Cyberpunk; Superhero
- Created by: Robert Goodman
- Based on: Batman Beyond by: Paul Dini; Bruce Timm; Alan Burnett
- Voices of: Diedrich Bader; Julie Nathanson; Kurtwood Smith; Dominique Jennings; Eli Marienthal; Scott Marquette; Michael Rosenbaum; Lauren Tom
- Composers: Michael McCuistion; Lolita Ritmanis; Kristopher Carter
- Country of origin: United States
- Original language: English
- No. of seasons: 2
- No. of episodes: 26

Production
- Executive producers: Jean MacCurdy; Sander Schwartz (season 2)
- Producers: Robert Goodman; Liz Holzman
- Editors: Rob DeSales (season 1); Mark McNally (season 2)
- Running time: 21 minutes
- Production companies: Warner Bros. Television Animation; Warner Bros. Family Entertainment

Original release
- Network: Kids' WB
- Release: January 27, 2001 – August 10, 2002

Related
- Batman Beyond; DC Animated Universe television series

The Zeta Project is an American animated science fiction television series produced by Warner Bros. Television Animation, which originally aired on Kids' WB between January 27, 2001, and August 10, 2002. It is the sixth series of the DC Animated Universe, and a Batman Beyond spin-off series. The series was created by Robert Goodman.

The story's main character, Infiltration Unit Zeta, is a humanoid robot (synthoid) designed to carry out covert assassinations on behalf of the National Security Agency. When Zeta discovers that one of his targets is innocent, he experiences an existential crisis about goodness and the value of life; following this epiphany, Zeta finds he can no longer kill. He refuses to continue working as an infiltration unit and abandons his mission, going rogue. As he tries to find his creator, Dr. Selig, Zeta is pursued by a team of NSA agents led by Agent Bennet and aided by a 15-year-old runaway, Rosalie "Ro" Rowan.

The series was cancelled after two seasons and 26 episodes.

== Overview ==
The Zeta Project is inspired by Frankenstein, Blade Runner, and The Fugitive, and follows Zeta and Ro as they attempt to prove he is non-violent, while the NSA agents pursuing him presume the terrorists he was investigating before going rogue have reprogrammed him for an unknown purpose. To prove his innocence, Zeta and Ro search for his creator, the elusive Dr. Selig.

A spin-off of Batman Beyond, Goodman initially pitched the series with plans to be darker than the original show. However, when the pitch went to Kids' WB, the network wanted shows that would skew to a younger demographic, and The Zeta Project was ultimately picked up with the thought process "It's a robot, and it's a teenage girl. How much fun can that be?". The series staff promised that most of the locations Zeta would encounter would not be as dark, gothic, and oppressive as Batman Beyond's Gotham City. As a result of this and other constraints, Goodman's original vision for the show's messages on dark government, misuse of technology, and various social and political issues became more difficult to execute.

Despite the lighter tone adopted by the final product, Kids' WB felt The Zeta Project was too dark throughout its run and almost canceled it entirely following the September 11th attacks due to its plotlines involving terrorism and commentary on the NSA. The series continued for one more season before Goodman left, believing that network demands were pushing the series away from his vision.

== Characters ==
=== Infiltration Unit Zeta ===
Zeta is a synthoid who was originally designed to gather information and kill select targets for the NSA. However, after realizing that one of his targets was actually innocent, he refused to kill anymore and went on the run. Ever since, Zeta's creators have been pursuing him, convinced that he was reprogrammed by terrorists. Zeta hopes that his creator, Dr. Selig, can prove his innocence, and so is searching for him. He meets Rosalie after saving her from a street gang, and in return she helps him escape from the agents pursuing him. Though Zeta no longer possesses most weapons he was originally equipped with, his arms are equipped with saw blades and cutting lasers; he also possesses various non-lethal tools, such as welding lasers, a computer interface, and an unlimited credit card. He has a high-endurance metal frame and the ability to project a hologram around himself and alter his voice. Additionally, he is faster than a human, can perceive wavelengths outside human perception, and is self-repairing to a limited degree.

=== Rosalie "Ro" Rowan ===
Rosalie Rowan is a 15-year-old girl who grew up in foster care in Hillsburg with Sheriff Morgan and his family before being assigned to a state-run home on Gaines Street. The only thing she knows about her family is vague memories of an older brother, who she was separated from years ago by the foster care system. She ran away from the state system at fifteen years old and joined a gang to have a home. But when she refused to take part in robbing a bank to prove herself to the leader, she left the gang. As she and Zeta search for his creator, Ro embarks on her own journey as she searches for a "family" to belong to. She serves as Zeta's guide to "passing" among humans, and teaches him lessons about being human. Additionally, she is a source of comedy in the series, contrasting with Zeta's stoic nature. She is visually inspired by Pris from Blade Runner.

=== Special Agent James Bennet ===
Agent Bennet is the leader of the NSA team sent to capture Zeta and bring him back alive, believing him to be working with the terrorist organization Brother's Day. Despite his supposed professionalism, he is shown disobeying orders when it suits him and abusing his authority. Despite overhearing a conversation between Dr. Selig and Zeta, in which Selig admits he implanted a chip inside Zeta that gave him a conscience, it is unknown if he is willing to cease being his enemy. Bennet is inspired by Lt. Philip Gerard from The Fugitive.

=== Dr. Eli Selig ===
Eli Selig is Zeta's creator, who knows his abilities and limitations better than anyone else. Since building Zeta, he has moved on to a secretive government project and become reclusive, only appearing where and when his work demands.

=== Agent Orin West and Marcia Lee ===
Formerly Scout Unit Four, partner NSA Agent Orin West and Marcia Lee fail to capture Zeta at the Wood Valley Maryland hoverbus station and are assigned to work for Agent Bennet as punishment, dedicating themselves to capturing Zeta.

West is clumsy and overeager, while Lee is more controlled and by-the-book and keeps him in check. Lee has her doubts about Zeta's guilt and is willing to believe he might be peaceful, which sometimes putting her at odds with Bennet. Lee eventually leaves Bennet's team and is replaced by Agent Rush.

West shares a last name with and resembles Wally West, who is also voiced by Rosenbaum. However, showrunner Bob Goodman has stated this was coincidental.

=== Bucky Buenaventura ===
Bucky Buenaventura is a 12-year-old boy and child prodigy, who was emancipated by his parents and lives in the Sorben Institute, an academic think tank. He is skilled at hacking and loves hacking into high-security corporate computers and exposing government secrets to show that he is capable of it. Bucky travels around freely and shows interest in Zeta and Ro as he keeps an eye on them.

=== Infiltration Unit 7 ===
IU7 is the next generation of Infiltration Unit after Zeta, which Agent Bennet unleashes to capture its predecessor. Like him, it is a synthoid with mimicry skills and wields a large arsenal of weapons, but its metal frame is larger, powerful, and heavily armed. Because of the single-mindedness of IU7's programming, Zeta and Ro usually find ways to outsmart it.

== Voice cast ==
=== Protagonists ===
Voice actor	Role
Diedrich Bader	Zeta
Julie Nathanson	Rosalie "Ro" Rowan
Eli Marienthal	Kid Zee

=== Supporting cast ===
Voice actor	Role
Lauren Tom	Agent Marcia Lee
Ulysses Cuadra	Bucky Buenaventura (Season 1)
Blayn Barbosa	Bucky Buenaventura (Season 2)
Grey DeLisle	Andrea Donoso
George Segal	Eli Selig (Season 1)
Hal Linden	Eli Selig (Season 2)
Lukas Haas	Casey MacCurdy
Will Friedle	Terry McGinnis/Batman
Kevin Conroy	Bruce Wayne

=== Antagonists ===
Voice actor	Role
Kurtwood Smith	Agent James Bennet
Michael Rosenbaum	Agent West
Erika Alexander	Agent Rush (Season 1)
Dominique Jennings	Agent Rush (Season 2)
Keith Szarabajka	Rodin Krick (Season 1)
Richard Moll	Rodin Krick (Season 2)
Robert Costanzo	Titus Sweete
Stuart Pankin	Donald Tannor
Jim Wise	Dr. Byrne
John Rhys-Davies	Edgar Mandragora / The Albino
Kate Jackson	Bombshell
Phil LaMarr	Schiz

== Episodes ==
=== Series overview ===
Season	Episodes	Originally released	
Season	Episodes	First released	Last released
1	12	January 27, 2001	August 11, 2001
2	14	March 23, 2002	August 10, 2002

=== Season 1 (2001) ===
No. overall	No. in season	Title	Directed by	Written by	Original release date	Prod. code
1	1	"The Accomplice"	Curt Geda	Robert Goodman	January 27, 2001	TZP–001
Zeta is on the run from the NSA. He saves the life of a 15-year-old runaway, Ro Rowan, who helps him escape and agrees to help him in exchange for money. Ro persuades Zeta, whom she dubs "Zee", to search for his creators, since they would be able to prove his innocence. Zeta convinces Ro to distract the clumsy Agent West while he breaks into the NSA van to download information on his creators. Ro does not succeed in distracting West for long, so, against her inclinations, she rescues Zeta and decides to stay with him and help him find his creators.
2	2	"His Maker's Name"	Tim Maltby	Story by : Hilary J. Bader; Teleplay by : Hilary J. Bader & Robert Goodman	February 3, 2001	TZP–002
Zeta and Ro look for one of Zeta's creators, Dr. Arroyo, who now works at a Space Lab. They do not find him, but they escape from the NSA in a van of Spacies, futuristic hippies who protest the commercialization of space. Ro goes with the Spacies to a protest at the Space Lab, when she sees Dr. Arroyo. She convinces Dr. Arroyo, who believes Zeta wants to kill him, to meet Zeta. When Zeta goes to meet Arroyo, he finds that he has walked into a trap set by Agent Bennet. Zeta saves Arroyo's life when the trap malfunctions, and the scientist helps Zeta to escape. Arroyo tells Zeta that the man that he wants to find is Dr. Selig.
3	3	"Remote Control"	Curt Geda	Ralph Soll	February 10, 2001	TZP–004
Zeta and Ro go looking for Dr. Selig at a science convention. They find that Dr. Selig is not there, and meet Bucky Buenaventura, a 12-year-old genius who has invented a universal remote control. Bucky, upon finding out that Zeta is a synthoid, uses the remote control to control him and play pranks at the science convention. When Bucky finds out that Tannor copied his control and tried to pass it off as his own, he attempts to use Zeta and enact revenge. Ro arrives and uses the copied inductance controller to stop Zeta from hurting Tannor. Zeta destroys Bucky's remote, and warns him not to use it again.
4	4	"Change of Heart"	Bob Doucette	Kevin Hopps	February 17, 2001	TZP–003
Zeta and Ro track Dr. Selig to a museum, where they meet a woman and her daughter, Cora Walker. Zeta rescues Cora from a fusion reactor after the NSA agents arrive. Ro and Zeta escape from the NSA just in time, and Zeta catches a glimpse of Dr. Selig. Ro admits that she sometimes wonders about her parents, whom she has never met.
5	5	"The Next Gen"	Tim Maltby	Story by : Hilary J. Bader; Teleplay by : Rich Fogel	February 24, 2001	TZP–005
Zeta is searching the Internet at the cybercafe Groundwire, when he accidentally intercepts a mission for another Infiltration Unit. Zeta decides that he must stop Infiltration Unit 7 from killing its target, the arms dealer Roland DeFlores. At the airport, Zeta and Ro meet Bucky Buenaventura, who wants to take control of IU7, an improved model of Zeta. Zeta fights IU7, and, with the help of Ro and Bucky, defeats it. Ro, Bucky, and Zeta return to the United States. Bucky admits that he likes Ro and Zeta, and wants to help them. IU7 begins to repair itself. Its memory is damaged, but it remembers fighting Zeta, so it chooses him as its next target.
6	6	"West Bound"	Bob Doucette	Story by : Stacey Liss Goodman & Robert Goodman; Teleplay by : Wendell Morris & Tom Sheppard	March 10, 2001	TZP–006
Zeta and Ro flee the NSA on a train, but Agent West manages to board with them. Zeta's hologram projector malfunctions, causing him to take on the appearance of anyone that he has just seen. This makes it easy for Agent West to find him as the NSA closes in. Zeta and Ro escape, but are separated. However, they quickly find each other again, and Ro says that they are beginning to think alike.
7	7	"Hicksburg"	Curt Geda	Paul Diamond	March 31, 2001	TZP–007
Ro decides to visit her old foster family, the Morgans, in hope of finding information on her biological family. Ro uses Zeta's unlimited cred card to purchase expensive gifts, telling Zeta that she wants to impress them. When Ro's foster sister Tiffy opens the door, Zeta transforms into the vid star Adam Heat and kisses Tiffy, in an unwanted attempt to help Ro. Tiffy convinces Zeta to help her by playing the part of Romeo in Tiffy's Shakespeare audition. The stage's scenery projector malfunctions and causes Zeta to lose his hologram. Ro's foster father, the sheriff, goes after Zeta, but when Zeta saves the theater from destruction, decides to let him go. Tiffy gives a picture to Ro that she admits she stole, and tells Ro that it is a picture of her brother.
8	8	"Shadows"	Tim Maltby	Rich Fogel	April 7, 2001	TZP–008
Infiltration Unit 7 resumes its search for Zeta and tracks him to a shopping mall in Gotham City, where Ro is trying to teach him about fun through video games. IU7 adopts a hologram to look like Zeta, and approaches Ro to learn his whereabouts. Ro realizes that IU7 is a fake, but cannot stop him from attacking the real Zeta. In the ensuing fight, the mall is destroyed, but Zeta manages to prevent anyone being hurt, except for Ro. Zeta brings Ro to the hospital, where he is told that she will be all right, but he still feels guilty and begins to question if whether or not Ro should continue to remain by his side. Batman sees the destruction of the mall and believes Zeta to be responsible. He tracks Zeta to the hospital, where Zeta is saying goodbye to an unconscious Ro. Batman believes that Zeta intends to kill her, and breaks in to stop him. He tries to destroy Zeta, but is stopped by a newly awakened Ro, revealing the truth. Batman does not believe Zeta is innocent, until IU7 breaks in. Batman helps Zeta to fight IU7, and IU7 is destroyed by a magnetic wave. Batman apologizes, and Zeta tells Ro that he does not want her with him because it is too dangerous. Ro refuses to leave, and tells Zeta that she is having fun.
9	9	"Crime Waves"	Bob Doucette	Story by : Kevin Hopps; Teleplay by : Kevin Hopps & Rich Fogel	April 14, 2001	TZP–009
Zeta and Ro are enjoying a day at the beach, when they come upon a boy being harassed by bikers. Zeta saves him, and they find out that he is Wade Pennington, the son of a wealthy robotics manufacturer. Wade invites Ro and Zeta for lunch at his compound, along with his bodyguard, Sven. Ro is angry to see that Wade is very spoiled, rude, and abuses his robots. She and Zeta leave. However, later it is found that Wade has been kidnapped, and Ro and Zeta have been framed. They investigate, and find out that Sven kidnapped Wade to collect the ransom money from Wade's father. Zeta and Ro go to Sven's boat to stop him, and Sven says that he will kill Wade, Ro, and Zeta and turn the two of them in for the reward money. Zeta reveals that he is a robot to a shocked Wade. The three of them stop Sven, and Wade learns to respect his robots more.
10	10	"Taffy Time"	Tim Maltby	Joseph Kuhr	May 5, 2001	TZP–010
Zeta and Ro are fleeing Agents West and Lee, and are led into the Koala Candy Factory by a mysterious stranger. The stranger turns out to be Rodin Krick, a bounty hunter who wants to turn Zeta in for the reward money. Zeta escapes from Krick and gets Ro out of the factory before Krick activates a force field that traps Zeta inside. Agent Lee had also entered the factory. Krick finds her, and takes her hostage, threatening to kill her if Zeta does not reveal himself. Zeta helps Lee escape, and Ro finds a way back into the factory. Zeta and Ro defeat Krick, injuring his face. Agent Lee is reluctantly going to arrest Zeta, but West manages to get himself handcuffed to the railing, and Lee gratefully uses the excuse to let Zeta go. Lee begins to realize that Zeta is innocent.
11	11	"Kid Genius"	Bob Doucette	Paul Diamond	August 11, 2001	TZP–012
Ro and Zeta are driving a motorcycle along the magway, when they are interrupted by a tornado warning. Bucky then takes remote control of the motorcycle and brings them to his house in the suburbs. He wants Zeta's help in finding his parents, who were kidnapped by Dr. Tannor. Zeta agrees, and they go with Bucky to the clinic where Tannor now works. Bucky's parents are working on a machine designed to rejuvenate patients, but it has malfunctioned, turning them and several patients into children. Tannor knocks Zeta out and tells Bucky that if he fixes the machine, he will give Zeta and the Buenaventuras back. Bucky grudgingly begins to fix the machine, but he cannot make it work. Tannor tries to destroy Zeta, but Zeta escapes and finds Ro and Bucky. The machine malfunctions and threatens to destroy the compound. Zeta, Ro, Bucky, and the children all escape, as Zeta downloads the machine's schematics to return the transformed people to normal.
12	12	"Ro's Reunion"	Tim Maltby	Story by : Katy Cooper & Ned Teitelbaum; Teleplay by : Katy Cooper & Ned Teitelbaum and Rich Fogel & Kevin Hopps	November 24, 2001 (Note: in Canada)	TZP–011
Ro wants to meet her brother, and is practicing talking to him with Zeta in a hologram to match his picture. Ro finds out about a TV show that helps kids find their family members, and Zeta insists that she go on it. However, Ro realizes that once she is on the show, Bennet will be able to find her and she will never be able to see Zeta again. Zeta insists that she try to find her brother anyway, and so they separate. Later, Zeta sees a girl who had been on the show earlier complaining that the woman she met was an actress and not her real mother. Zeta discovers that the show does not really find lost family members, but instead makes money by turning runaways back to the state. Zeta goes to save Ro. When Ro meets her 'brother,' she realizes that although he looks like her, he looks nothing like the picture she has. Zeta exposes the show to be a fake, and the producer, who did not know what was going on, vows to change it. Zeta and Ro escape, and Ro tells Zeta that he is the only family that she needs. Note: For unknown reasons, this episode did not air in the United States.

=== Season 2 (2002) ===
No. overall	No. in season	Title	Directed by	Written by	Original release date	Prod. code
13	1	"Absolute Zero"	Curt Geda	Robert Goodman & Kevin Hopps	March 23, 2002	TZP–013
Zeta finds out that Dr. Selig is meeting at Cryobin, a cryogenics lab, with scientist Dr. Wilhelm. Zeta pretends to be Wilhelm by imitating his retinal patterns, but a confrontation ensues when the real Wilhelm shows up. Selig's guards shoot at Zeta, but they miss and destroy the computer in the cryogenics room. The room is evacuated, and no one notices that Selig has been trapped in a cryogenic freeze unit. Zeta controls the freeze unit to keep Selig's temperature stable until help can arrive, but Agent Bennet, realizing Zeta is in Cryobin, decides to defy orders to go after him. Zeta is monitoring the temperature, but an explosion makes him pull away out of concern for Ro. Ro is all right, but the explosion has further damaged the cryogenic unit. Zeta has to take Selig out and use his internal heating to keep his condition stable. He ultimately saves Selig but does not get a chance to talk to him. Bennet is stopped by his superiors, and Agent Lee reveals that she tipped them off. Lee believes Zeta is innocent, so she resigns from Bennet's team. Zeta and Ro escape.
14	2	"Wired"	Curt Geda	Robert Goodman	March 30, 2002	TZP–014
15	3	"Wired"	Liz Holzman	Robert Goodman	April 6, 2002	TZP–015
Part 1: The NSA is catching up to Zeta and Ro. Bucky is trying to communicate with them when his transmission is interrupted. Ro and Zeta are rescued by three hackers, Meg, Plug, and Buss. They all seem to be fans of Zeta, and Buss has an obsessive crush on Ro. Meg and Plug convince Zeta to allow them to take him apart and see how he works, and in exchange they will help him find Dr. Selig. Ro is reluctantly taken to Buss's house. Bucky manages to message Ro, warning her that Meg and Plug want to use Zeta for parts. Ro escapes to save Zeta, and Zeta repairs himself while Ro drives one of the hackers' motorcycles. The motorcycle runs out of power, the NSA captures Zeta, but Ro is saved by Buss. She is informed that the NSA plans to erase Zeta's memory. Part 2: Following from the previous episode, Zeta has been captured by the NSA and taken for reprogramming. Ro tries to find him and tracks him to a government warehouse, where she calls Bucky. He refuses to help out of fear that he is being tracked, so she breaks in herself. Inside, Bennet and the other agents discover a module in Zeta's head that was not on his schematics. They erase Zeta's memories as he struggles to hold on to what he can. Then, they attempt to alter the module. Zeta sees them as hostile targets and breaks free, beginning to destroy the warehouse. Bennet asks Ro to reveal Zeta's position, but she refuses, defending him over the intercom. Zeta hears her speak and is able to access his saved memories. Zeta and Ro escape. Zeta expresses concern over the module in his head and the fact that he has no idea what it does, but it caused him to behave violently. Ro consoles him, telling him that "Everyone has good and bad inside them", and that it makes him more human.
16	4	"Resume Mission"	Rob Davies	Story by : Ralph Soll and Liz Holzman; Teleplay by : Ralph Soll	April 13, 2002	TZP–019
An 11-year-old boy, Jason Foley, is given spare parts from his father to work on. He puts a computer chip from these parts in his computer. The computer is taken over by Infiltration Unit 7, which begins to order parts to repair itself. Zeta is scanning for a shoulder part that he needs on the net when he discovers orders being placed to rebuild IU7. Deciding that Jace Foley must be in danger, he and Ro go to stop IU7. IU7 is still determined to damage Zeta, but must also acquire all of the parts necessary to rebuild itself. When Zeta comes, the two synthoids fight and IU7 seemingly manages to kill Zeta. He goes to recover a final part he needs, taking Jace hostage. Zeta repairs himself, and he and Ro go to the warehouse where Jace was taken. Zeta removes IU7's CPU chip, and the synthoid is shut down. NSA agents come to clean up, led by Agent Lee. Zeta gives Lee IU7's CPU chip, and she lets Zeta and Ro go.
17	5	"Hunt in the Hub"	T. J. House	Story by : Paul Diamond; Teleplay by : Paul Diamond & Robert Goodman	April 20, 2002	TZP–016
Zeta and Ro track Dr. Boyle, an associate of Dr. Selig, to the Hub, a business/commercial center and center of air traffic. However, Boyle has set a trap and attaches a chip to Zeta which will not allow him to use his cred card. This causes him to be deemed a vagrant and pursued by security guards. Boyle says that he will remove the chip if Zeta and Ro steal parts for his new project, to which they agree. Zeta steals several parts, but after several close calls, he and Ro come up with a plan to stop him. They allow several NSA agents to see Ro seemingly giving parts to Boyle, and Zeta in a hologram accepting them and confessing everything. Zeta and Ro get Boyle to remove the chip, and then the agents chase after Boyle. Zeta and Ro escape on a hyperplane and Rush and West follow, only to be locked in second class while the fugitives are in first class.
18	6	"Ro's Gift"	Rob Davies	Story by : Hilary J. Bader & Joseph Kuhr; Teleplay by : Joseph Kuhr	April 27, 2002	TZP–017
While disguised as Ro, Zeta disables a malfunctioning robot. The Brain Trust (from the Batman Beyond episode "Mind Games") witness this, believe Ro to have superpowers, and kidnap her to recruit her into their group. The Brain Trust plans to set off a radio tower to release radioactive waves onto the town, intending to awaken powers in children. However, Zeta, Ro, and the other kidnapped children manage to stop them. Afterwards, the town's sheriff lets Zeta and Ro go free out of gratitude.
19	7	"Lost and Found"	Curt Geda & T. J. House	Randy Rogel	May 11, 2002	TZP–020
While running from Krick, who is now out to destroy Zeta rather than turn him in, Zeta stops functioning. Ro gets him to an abandoned circus, then calls Bucky, who comes over to help repair him. In the meanwhile, Zeta's last mission before going rogue is revealed. He infiltrated the household of suspected terrorist Eugene Dolan, but learned that he was innocent, leading to him going rogue. Later, Dolan discovers that Zeta is impersonating him, but Zeta decides not to terminate him. After working on him, Bucky says Zeta's mind is completely scrambled, and there may be nothing he can do. Then Ro explains what it was like for her at the girls' home and what happened on the day she ran out. Krick eventually catches up with them and, at the last moment, Zeta recovers and disables him. Krick is then arrested.
20	8	"Eye of the Storm"	Tim Maltby	Story by : Ralph Soll; Teleplay by : Christopher Simmons	May 18, 2002	TZP–024
In Kansas, Zeta and Ro meet two brothers who have designed a hover pod to disperse tornadoes. The younger brother, Carl, is overshadowed by his older brother Dex, who does the piloting, and goes off to stop a massive tornado alone in an attempt to prove himself. However, he injures his arm and is unable to properly pilot the aircraft, so Zeta enters the tornado himself to rescue him and help stop the storm. Dex learns to respect Carl more and acknowledge his scientific prowess.
21	9	"Quality Time"	Tim Maltby	Story by : Kevin Hopps & Ralph Soll; Teleplay by : Robert Goodman	July 13, 2002	TZP–018
Bennet becomes overly dedicated to his work and ignores his son, James Bennet Jr., but agrees to take him to the Burnett Marine Research Center, located near a coral reef. Zeta and Ro are also at the reef looking for Selig, with Ro going on a submarine trip with James. However, they collide with the reef's artificial support system and are left grounded on the seafloor with the submarine slowly flooding. Zeta and Bennet are forced into an uneasy alliance to rescue them. After rescuing James, Bennet decides to take time off work to spend more time with him.
22	10	"On the Wire"	Curt Geda	Joseph Kuhr	July 20, 2002	TZP–021
Agents West and Rush chase Zeta and Ro to a comic book convention. After they escape, Bucky helps reunite Ro with her long-lost brother, Casey McCurdy, a reporter. His boss, Pat Jensen, recognizes Ro as Zeta's accomplice and coerces him into helping capture the two in exchange for a promotion. However, Casey has second thoughts and helps them escape. Casey is fired, but vows to keep in touch and help improve Zeta's reputation.
23	11	"Cabin Pressure"	Rob Davies & Olaf Miller	Lyle Weldon	July 27, 2002	TZP–022
The NSA capture Bucky after identifying him and his connection to Zeta and Ro, but he manages to send a distress signal to the two. While Zeta and Ro are infiltrating the NSA's plane to rescue Bucky, Bennet and Rush corner them and temporarily control Zeta with Bucky's remote before West blasts him out of the plane, leaving him clinging to its sides. However, Ro and Bucky manage to get to the escape pods and rescue Zeta. Bucky is left unable to return to the Sorben Institute and becomes a fugitive. However, he thanks Zeta and Ro and modifies Zeta to make him immune to further mind control.
24	12	"The River Rising"	Curt Geda	Story by : Paul Diamond; Teleplay by : Joseph Kuhr	August 3, 2002	TZP–025
During a chase through the forest, Zeta and Ro land in a "No-Tech" village, a group of people whose way of living is similar to that of Amish people, though more vehement in their disdain for technology. The NSA's vehicle is also damaged in the chase, leaving them stranded in the forest as Bennet tries to obtain a warrant to search the village. After discovering Zeta's identity, the No-Techs try to kill him, but he escapes as a dam breaks and the village floods, prompting a mass evacuation. The agents are forced to retreat after their vehicle is damaged and buried in mud. Zeta and Ro assist in rebuilding the village before leaving.
25	13	"The Hologram Man"	Rob Davies	Robert Goodman & Joseph Kuhr	August 10, 2002	TZP–026
Zeta and Ro enter a top-secret NSA debriefing building and encounter Marcus Edmund, who previously helped build Zeta's hologram emitters and was forced into assisting Brother's Day. Ro and Zeta pose as one of Sweete's lackeys and Edmund, respectively, and meet with Selig in the Gnosis, a laboratory where Zeta was created and Selig works. He reveals that he created the mysterious module in Zeta to function as a conscience, which Bennet overhears. Sweete destroys the Gnosis, forcing an emergency evacuation as Zeta and Ro escape and Selig and his synthoid assistant Andrea Donoso are presumed dead. Unbeknownst to anyone, Donoso emerges from the sea near the wreckage of his craft.
26	14	"The Wrong Morph"	Curt Geda	David Benullo	November 23, 2002	TZP–023
Zeta and Ro are infiltrating a youth center run by Dr. Myrell, who previously helped create synthoids before dedicating himself to helping disabled children using special devices. While doing so, they encounter a thief stealing Myrell's devices, but are unable to stop him. Because Zeta disguised himself as Kevin, one of the children at the center, he inadvertently gets him arrested for suspected involvement in the theft. After investigating, Zeta learns that the thief is Blake, a customer of Myrell who resorted to crime to earn funds for him, and is able to stop him. Note: For unknown reasons, this episode did not air in the United States.

== Broadcast history ==
United States

- Kids' WB (2001–2002)

Canada

- YTV (2001–2008)
- Teletoon (2004–2009)

United Kingdom

- Cartoon Network (2001–2008)
- Boomerang (2008)
- Sky1 (2001–2002)

Australia

- Cartoon Network (2001–2008)
- Nine Network (2001–2003)

France

- Cartoon Network (2001–2003)

Brazil

- Cartoon Network (2001–2007)
- SBT (2003–2015; 2021–present)
- Tooncast (2021–present)

Chile

- Chilevisión (2010–2018)
- Boomerang (2007–2009)
- Canal 13 (2005–2013)

Venezuela

- Venevisión (2005–2008)
- Boomerang (2007–2009)

Latin America

- Boomerang (2007–2009)
- Cartoon Network (2001–2007)
- Tooncast (2021–present)

Middle East

- MBC 3 (2007–2010)

New Zealand

- TVNZ 2 (2003–2009)

Russia

- STS (2002–2003)

Mexico

- Canal 5 (2008–2010)
- Las Estrellas (2004–2006)

Republic of Ireland

- RTÉ Two (2001–2002)

== Cancellation and future ==
Following the September 11th attacks, Kids' WB considered canceling The Zeta Project, but Bob Goodman convinced them he could keep the show running without even mentioning terrorists. However, Kids' WB demanded that if the series were to be picked up for a third season, this season needed to end on a cliffhanger that appeared to kill Zeta's creator, Dr. Selig. Eventually, Kids' WB told Goodman that the finale would be the end of Zeta's search for Selig, and that a third season would reveal that Ro was also a robot, and follow a Scooby-Doo-esque adventure of the week formula. Tired of network demands getting in the way of his vision, Goodman ultimately quit the show. Interviews were held to replace him as showrunner, but enthusiasm for the series lowered following his exit.

In December 2004, John Schneider revealed he was working on a filmed version of the series with series creator Bob Goodman. Goodman later expanded, saying Warner Bros. Television Studios was interested in adapting the series in an hour long format. As producers, Schneider and Goodman developed a live-action series that took liberties with the Zeta concept to fit the sensibilities of the network at the time, which included lessening similarities to The Fugitive, since the recent reboot underperformed expectations. The series would have featured Ro working in the FBI's cyber crimes unit, with Zeta having replaced her partner in the pilot. The series would have had them solving cases week to week while hunting down Zeta's creator and Ro's family.

Over the years, Bob Goodman has stated a desire to finish the series' story, in either comic form or long-form straight-to-DVD format. Over the years, he has hinted at many plot points for unproduced seasons, including:

- The hand seen in the cliffhanger being revealed to belong to Andrea Donoso, Selig's synthoid assistant and bodyguard,
- Selig having a new plan with important work for Zeta,
- Ro's search for her family, focusing on her mother,
- Plans for an Infiltration Unit 8,
- An episode referencing the fan theory that Agent West was a descendant of Wally West by temporarily giving him super-speed.

== Legacy ==
=== Influence ===
Despite the show's relative obscurity, The Zeta Project has made its way into many other DC projects. Early synthoids resembling Zeta's original design, dubbed Z-8s, appear in Justice League and Justice League Unlimited. In 2013, Zeta appeared in Batman Beyond Unlimited #16 as part of the new Terrific Trio, alongside Plastic Man and Batman Beyond villain Earth Mover. The seventh and eighth seasons of Arrow featured a 2040s set future where a company named Galaxy One unleashed robot soldiers named Zeta. The AI in 2022's Batman Unburied podcast was named Zeta, after The Zeta Project. In 2025, the series Batman/Static: Beyond featured a fleet of "Zeta Cops" modeled after Zeta's original design.

=== Accolades ===
Year	Award	Category	Nominee(s)	Result	Ref.
2001	Annie Awards	Outstanding Individual Achievement for Music Score in an Animated Television Production	Kristopher Carter, Michael McCuistion, Lolita Ritmanis, Shirley Walker	Nominated	
2001	Annie Awards	Outstanding Individual Achievement for Storyboarding in an Animated Television Production	Adam Van Wyk	Nominated	
2001	Women's Image Network Awards	Best Daytime Series		Won	
2001	Women's Image Network Awards	Best Actress in a Daytime Series	Julie Nathanson as Rosalie "Ro" Rowan	Won	
2002	Daytime Emmy Awards	Outstanding Achievement in Music Direction and Composition	Kristopher Carter, Michael McCuistion, Lolita Ritmanis, Shirley Walker	Nominated	
2002	Women's Image Network Awards	Best Actress in an Animated Series	Julie Nathanson as Rosalie "Ro" Rowan	Won	
2002	Women's Image Network Awards	Best Actor in an Animated Series	Diedrich Bader as Zeta	Won	
2002	Women's Image Network Awards	Best Actor in an Animated Series	Paul Amendt as "Plug"	Nominated	
2003	Annie Awards	Production Design In An Animated Television Production	Rosalina Tchouchev	Nominated	
2003	Daytime Emmy Awards	Outstanding Achievement in Music Direction and Composition	Kristopher Carter, Michael McCuistion, Lolita Ritmanis	Nominated	

== Music ==
As with other DCAU shows before it, The Zeta Project was scored by Lolita Ritmanis, Michael McCuistion, Kristopher Carter, and supervising composer Shirley Walker. Working concurrently with the final season of Batman Beyond, for Zeta's first season, the Walker team worked to compose original music for each episode that blended the sound of a live orchestra composed of musicians hired from American Federation of Musicians Local 47, with more contemporary electronic elements the team recorded in their own studio.

According to McCuistion, "Each episode was a different take, musically, and there were some threads of course, but I remember several of them having different musical environments, and that was really interesting creatively. [...] it certainly didn't share any of the flavor of Batman Beyond in terms of music, I don't think. It was very futuristic and very fun, but yeah, it didn't have that sort of gritty, underworld cultural thing going on."

The Zeta Project was the final series the Dynamic Music Partners (Ritmanis, McCuistion, Carter) had a live orchestra on, and played a hand in the Dynamic Music Partners being hired to score Treyarch's Spider-Man.

=== Emmy For Your Consideration CD Track Listing ===
Disc One (Total Time 18:21)
- Main Title 1:01
- Making Contact 2:36
- His Maker's Name 1:05
- Ro & Zee Meet Again 1:09
- Desperate Escape 1:31
- Bucky's Parent Woes 1:26
- Zeta Escapes 1:35
- Sorben Institute 0:51
- Hide and Seek 1:09
- West Gets Closer 1:42
- Perryville 0:24
- System Down 1:18
- Kid Genius? 0:49
- Nice Guy 0:57
- Sweet Revenge 0:56

== Home video ==
First announced at Warner Home Video's annual Home Theater Forum chat in September 2008, WHV (via DC Comics and Warner Bros. Family Entertainment) released the first season of The Zeta Project as a 2-DVD set for Region 1 on March 17, 2009. The bonus material for the set was handled by Retrofit Films, who reached out to fans of the series to help field interview questions for the cast and crew. While the released disc featured a 16-minute documentary featurette, titled "The Making of Zeta", about the show's origin with commentary from the voice cast and production staff, the original press release stated the set would include a since unreleased 15–20 minute featurette titled "Finding Freedom", a roundtable discussion, in which the cast speculates on various theories of where the series would have gone while producer/show runner Robert Goodman and his team give the fans the definitive answers.

The second season was initially reported to be on the way as early as December 2008. The following month, series creator Bob Goodman teased that bonus features for the season 2 set were filmed at the same time of the season 1 features, and later expanded that the season was slated to release in mid-2009 with a panel discussion featurette with Julie Nathanson, Liz Holzman, Joe Kuhr and himself that covered behind-the-scenes anecdotes. However, sales for season one did not meet Warner Home Video's expectations, resulting in the cancellation of the Season 2 release.

Alongside a re-printing of Season 1, Season 2 was finally announced for release by Warner Archive in February 2017 and arrived March 14, 2017. Attempts to locate the originally planned bonus features were unsuccessful, and they remain lost. To promote the release, Warner Archive held the "Warner Archive Collection's Kids' WB Flashback" panel at WonderCon Anaheim, featuring Diedrich Bader, Julie Nathanson, and Bob Goodman, as well as Phil LaMarr, who was representing WAC's recent Static Shock DVD releases.

As of July 2025, this series and Static Shock are the only two DCAU shows not available to stream on HBO Max, although the latter was on the service from 2021 to January 2025.

DVD name	# of episodes	Release date	Additional information
The Zeta Project: Season One	12	March 17, 2009, March 14, 2017 (re-release)	Episodes 1–12; "The Making of Zeta" Featurette; "Zeta" Batman Beyond episode; "Countdown" Batman Beyond episode; Batman: The Brave and the Bold trailer; Saturday Morning Cartoons trailer; Wonder Woman trailer; The Real Adventures of Johnny Quest trailer; Ben 10: Alien Force trailer; English and French subtitles; Warner Archive re-release is missing the cardboard slipcase from the original, and is made on demand
The Zeta Project: Season Two	14	March 14, 2017	Episodes 13–26; MOD release; available exclusively from Warner's online store and Amazon.com; No subtitles

== Video game ==
Zeta Quest 3D was launched May 24, 2001. Advertised as a unique multi-environment, multi-level "walk-through" online video game, Zeta Quest 3D, let players assume the identity of Zeta, staying one step ahead of the NSA, while trying to clear his name. The game was built for the short lived CyberWorld QBORGs Browser System. According to Bob Goodman, he and Joe Kuhr contributed to vetting the writing process of the game. Not much is known about the plot, but many of the games original files are archived online and include a room named "IU8 Lab", suggesting the existence of an Infiltration Unit 8, as well as sprites of doctors seen in the episode "Absolute Zero".

== See also ==
- Batman Beyond
