= Real Live! =

Live album by Mahogany Rush
- Released: November 9, 2004
- Recorded: Live in Montreal, Canada on September 8, 2001
- Venue: Club Soda
- Genre: Rock
- Length: 157:07
- Label: Justin Time Records; SPV/Steamhammer
- Producer: Frank Marino

Mahogany Rush chronology
Eye of the Storm (2001)	Real Live! (2004)

Professional ratings
Review scores
Source	Rating
Allmusic	4/5 stars
Classic Rock	4/5 stars

Real Live! is a double live album by Frank Marino & Mahogany Rush released on 9 November 2004 by Justin Time Records. The tracks from the first CD were re-released on 24 October 2020 as a limited edition (1,000 copies) double vinyl LP as part of Record Store Day.

== Track listing ==
=== Disc 1 ===
1. "Voodoo Chile" - 10:02
2. "Something's Comin' Our Way (Excerpt)" - 2:38
3. "He's Calling" - 14:39
4. "Red House" - 12:11
5. "Guitar Prelude to a Hero" - 2:22
6. "Stories of a Hero" - 9:51
7. "Poppy" - 17:24
8. "She's Not There" - 1:42
9. "Crossroads" - 3:53
10. "She's Not There (Return)" - 0:41
11. "Poppy (Return)" - 2:31

=== Disc 2 ===
1. "Let There Be" - 3:11
2. "Strange Universe" - 3:23
3. "Ode to Creation" - 10:07
4. "Strange Universe" - 3:07
5. "Rock and Roll Hall of Fame" - 2:50
6. "Ain't Dead Yet (excerpt)" - 1:34
7. "Slippin' and Slidin" - 1:19
8. "Back to the Hall" - 2:50
9. "Two and Four (Just Joshin')" - 6:35
10. "Avalon" - 7:30
11. "Rumble 'n' Roll (For Pete's Sake)" - 1:43
12. "Jazzed for a Moment" - 1:54
13. "Tales of the Unexpected" - 4:16
14. "Return to Avalon" - 2:15
15. "Rattle of Sabres" - 1:19
16. "Electric Reflections of War" - 4:49
17. "Aftermath" - 1:07
18. "The World Anthem" - 2:12
19. "A Prayer for Peace" - 2:22
20. "Somewhere over the Rainbow" - 2:19
21. "Try for Freedom" - 12:31

== Personnel ==
- Frank Marino - lead guitar, vocals, engineer, mixing
- Mick Layne - guitar
- Peter Dowse - bass
- Josh Trager - drums
