= Mahogany Rush IV =

Studio album by Mahogany Rush
- Released: 1976
- Recorded: 1976
- Studio: Tempo Studios (Montreal)
- Length: 43:44
- Label: Columbia
- Producer: Frank Marino

Mahogany Rush chronology
Strange Universe (1975)	Mahogany Rush IV (1976)	World Anthem (1977)

Professional ratings
Review scores
Source	Rating
Allmusic	1.5/5 stars

Mahogany Rush IV is the fourth studio album by Canadian Rock music band Mahogany Rush, led by Frank Marino. It was released in 1976 on Columbia Records.

Covers of 3 of the songs on Mahogany Rush IV, "The Answer" (Randy Hansen), "It's Begun to Rain" (Audley Freed), and "Dragonfly" (Karl Cochran), appear on the 2005 Secondhand Smoke - A Tribute to Frank Marino album.

== Track listing ==
All songs written by Frank Marino.

1. "I'm Going Away" - 4:06
2. "Man at the Back Door" - 3:42
3. "The Answer" - 4:33
4. "Jive Baby" - 3:24
5. "It's Begun to Rain" - 6:25
6. "Dragonfly" - 5:07
7. "Little Sexy Annie" - 3:23
8. "Moonwalk" - 5:47
9. "IV... (The Emperor)" - 7:17

== Personnel ==
- Frank Marino - acoustic and electric guitars, synth bass on "I'm Going Away", Mellotron on "I'm Going Away", "It's Begun to Rain" and "IV... (The Emperor)", all vocals
- Paul Harwood - bass guitars
- Jimmy Ayoub - drums and percussion

== Charts ==
Country	Date	Peak position
US	1976	175
