= Child of the Novelty =

Studio album by Mahogany Rush
- Released: 1974
- Recorded: Tempo Studios, Montreal, Quebec, Canada, 1974
- Length: 38:44
- Label: Nine Records / 20th Century Fox Records
- Producer: Frank Marino

Mahogany Rush chronology
Maxoom (1972)	Child of the Novelty (1974)	Strange Universe (1975)

Professional ratings
Review scores
Source	Rating
allmusic	3/5 stars

Child of the Novelty is the second studio album by Canadian rock band Mahogany Rush, led by Frank Marino. It was released in 1974.

== Track listing ==
All songs by Frank Marino.

1. "Look Outside" - 3:33
2. "Thru the Milky Way" - 3:53
3. "Talkin' 'bout a Feelin'" - 3:03
4. "Child of the Novelty" - 4:07
5. "Makin' My Wave" - 4:39
6. "A New Rock and Roll" - 3:08
7. "Changing" - 3:14
8. "Plastic Man" - 3:13
9. "Guitwar" - 3:45
10. "Chains of (S)pace" - 5:59

== Personnel ==
- Frank Marino - guitar, vocals
- Paul Harwood - bass guitar
- Jimmy Ayoub - drums and percussion

== Charts ==
Country	Date	Peak position
CAN	1974	83
US	1974	74
