= Maxoom =

Studio album by Mahogany Rush
- Released: October 31, 1972 (Canada); 1973 (United States)
- Recorded: early 1972
- Studio: Little Coyote Studios, Quebec City, Canada
- Length: 35:21
- Label: Kot'ai Records (Canada); Nine Records / 20th Century Fox Records (USA)
- Producer: Frank Marino

Mahogany Rush chronology
Maxoom (1972)	Child of the Novelty (1974)

Professional ratings
Review scores
Source	Rating
Allmusic	2.5/5 stars

Maxoom is the debut studio album by Canadian rock band Mahogany Rush, released in October 1972 in Canada and in 1973 in the United States. The group's frontman Frank Marino is credited as the writer of all songs and the album's producer. The songs "Buddy" and "All in Your Mind" were previously released as a single in May 1972.

The album's front cover includes part of the central panel from Hans Memling's painting The Last Judgment. The phrase "Dedicated to Jimi Hendrix" is printed on the back cover.

The album reached #76 on the Canadian charts.

== Track listing ==
All songs written by Frank Marino. Lengths according to the Nine Records vinyl label.

No.	Title	Length
1.	"Maxoom"	2:59
2.	"Buddy"	3:40
3.	"Magic Man"	2:35
4.	"Funky Woman"	3:13
5.	"Madness"	4:50
6.	"All In Your Mind"	3:10
7.	"Blues"	7:06
8.	"Boardwalk Lady"	2:38
9.	"Back On Home"	3:18
10.	"The New Beginning"	1:52
Total length:		35:21

== Personnel ==
All information as per the original vinyl back cover.

Mahogany Rush

- Frank Marino - Guitar, Vocals
- Paul Harwood - Fender Bass
- James Ayoub - Drums, Percussion

Guest Musicians

- Phil Bech - Piano on "Blues"
- Johnny McDiarmid - Organ on "The New Beginning"

Production

- Frank Marino - Production, Arrangement
- Hubert Liesker - Recording Engineering
- Yvon Caron - Mastering Engineering
- Robert Nickford - Executive Production

Artwork

- Bob Lemm - Album Design
- Thomas Reti - Photography
- Robert Lips - Photography
- Hans Memling - Painting "The Last Judgment"
