= Rock the Rock =

Single by Craig McLachlan & Check 1–2

from the album Craig McLachlan & Check 1-2
- B-side: "Hot"
- Released: 27 November 1989
- Recorded: Platinum Studio, Melbourne
- Genre: Pop
- Length: 3:47
- Label: CBS
- Songwriters: Craig McLachlan, Garth Porter
- Producer: Garth Porter

Craig McLachlan & Check 1–2 singles chronology
"Rock the Rock" (1989)	"Mona" (1990)

"Rock the Rock" is the debut single from Australian actor/musician Craig McLachlan and band Check 1–2, from their eponymous debut album Craig McLachlan & Check 1-2. The track was released the week following McLachlan's departure as Henry on the Australian drama series, Neighbours.

The single peaked at No. 36 in Australia.

== Track listings ==
7"

1. "Rock the Rock" - 3:47
2. "Hot" - 3:01

12" (maxi)

1. "Rock the Rock" (12" version) - 6:45
2. "Rock the Rock" (7" version) - 3:47
3. "Hot" - 3:01

== Charts ==
Chart (1990)	Peak position
Australian ARIA Singles Chart	36
