= Amanda (Craig McLachlan song) =

Single by Craig McLachlan & Check 1–2

from the album Craig McLachlan & Check 1-2
- B-side: "Need Your Love"
- Released: July 1990
- Recorded: The Village Green
- Genre: Pop, SynthPop
- Length: 3:23
- Label: CBS
- Songwriter: Craig McLachlan
- Producer: Garth Porter

Craig McLachlan & Check 1–2 singles chronology
"Mona" (1990)	"Amanda" (1990)	"I Almost Felt Like Crying" (1990)

"Amanda"' is a song recorded by Australian actor/musician Craig McLachlan and band 'Check 1–2'. It was their third single from the album, Craig McLachlan & Check 1-2. It was a commercial success peaking at No. 24 in Australia and No. 19 in the UK. The “Amanda” in the song’s lyrics is rumoured to be McLachlan’s fiancée at the time, Rachel Friend, whose middle name is Amanda.

== Track listing ==
No.	Title	Writer(s)	Length
1.	"Amanda"	Craig McLachlan	3:23
2.	"Need Your Love"		3:21
3.	"Baby Loves Funky"		4:01

== Charts ==
Chart (1990)	Peak position
Australian ARIA Singles Chart	24
New Zealand Singles Chart	16
UK Singles Chart	16

== Credits ==
- Backing vocals – John Hinde, Lindsay Field, Lisa Edwards, Nikki Nicholls
- Bass – Mark Beckhouse
- Drums – Mark Meyer
- Keyboards – Garth Porter, Chong Lim
- Percussion – John Clark
