= Craig McLachlan =

Australian actor and singer (born 1965)

- Born: Craig Dougall McLachlan; 1 September 1965 (age 61); Long Jetty, New South Wales, Australia
- Occupations: Actor; singer; musician; composer; agent
- Years active: 1981–2018
- Known for: Neighbours as Henry Ramsay; Home and Away as Grant Mitchell; The Doctor Blake Mysteries as Dr. Lucien Blake
- Awards: Gold Logie; 4 x Silver Logie for Best Actor
- Musical career
- Genre: Pop
- Instruments: Vocals, guitar
- Label: CBS Records
- Formerly of: ChecK 1-2

Craig Dougall McLachlan (born 1 September 1965) is an Australian Gold Logie winning actor, musician, singer and composer. He has been involved in film, television, the music industry and music theatre for over 30 years. He is best known for appearing in the soap operas Neighbours and Home and Away and the BBC One spy drama Bugs. He has portrayed the title character in The Doctor Blake Mysteries, for which he was nominated for the Logie Award for Most Popular Actor; he has previously won the award in this category three times.

== Career ==
=== Television ===
McLachlan was born at Long Jetty, a suburb of the NSW Central Coast but moved to Sydney when he was around 16 to pursue an acting career. He secured a guest role on the evening TV soap opera The Young Doctors, as well as several television commercials. However, he soon moved back home and spent two years working as a labourer and gym instructor. After returning to Sydney, he secured a brief guest role as a student in two episodes of the Seven Network TV series Sons and Daughters.

In 1987, he was cast in Neighbours broadcast by Network Ten, in the regular role of Henry Ramsay, brother of Kylie Minogue's character Charlene. After winning the Gold Logie Award for Most Popular Personality on Australian Television (1990) and Silver Logie, he left Neighbours in 1989, but was soon contracted to Seven Network's Home and Away, playing schoolteacher and lifeguard Grant Mitchell.

=== Music ===
A singer, guitarist and songwriter, McLachlan enjoyed international success in a concurrent pop music career. He had hits in Australia and the UK with a remake of the Bo Diddley song "Mona (I Need You Baby)" and with self-penned songs "Amanda", "One Reason Why" and "On My Own". He toured the UK and Europe with his band Check 1–2. At the ARIA Music Awards of 1991, "Mona", won Highest Selling Single for Craig McLachlan & Check 1–2. In the following year, his single "On My Own" was one of several works by Simon Hussey, who won Producer of the Year.

=== Musicals ===
In 1993, McLachlan starred as Danny Zuko in the West End revival of the musical Grease alongside Deborah Gibson and Sonia Evans. In his stage musical career he starred as Frank-N-Furter in The Rocky Horror Show, Caractacus Pott in Chitty Chitty Bang Bang, Bob Wallace in White Christmas and Billy Flynn in Chicago.

=== 1990s–present ===
Throughout the first decade of the 21st century, McLachlan appeared in around 20 film and television projects, including the American movie Superfire, the television film Heroes' Mountain as Stuart Diver, and Blackjack with Colin Friels. In 2004, he played Michael Chamberlain in Through My Eyes, an account of the Lindy Chamberlain story, and began work in the recurring role of Kane Morgan in McLeod's Daughters. He played Jeff Kennard in the Australian film Hating Alison Ashley, worked alongside Benjamin Bratt and James Franco in The Great Raid, and starred with John Jarratt in Savages Crossing.

McLachlan appeared regularly in the Network Seven TV series Packed to the Rafters as ageing rocker Steve Wilson and was cast in the fourth season of Rescue: Special Ops as Hayden Bradley. He played the role of Steve, the handsome gay gardener, in the award-winning production At Home with Julia and appeared in the ABC comedy Lowdown.

In 2011, British group Rizzle Kicks sampled McLachlan's version of "Mona" for their single "Mama Do the Hump".

McLachlan returned to Australia in 2012 to work on a new TV series, The Doctor Blake Mysteries, a period crime drama set in Ballarat in 1959. He plays the titular role of Dr Lucien Blake, a medical practitioner with a knack for solving murders and annoying the police. The first two seasons originally screened on ABC Television.

In 2013, McLachlan was again cast as Frank-N-Furter in a revival of The Rocky Horror Show touring Australia in 2014. In December 2014, McLachlan revealed that he was unable to return to Neighbours for the show's 30th anniversary celebrations owing to scheduling conflicts and his involvement in The Doctor Blake Mysteries. However, McLachlan agreed to take part in the documentary special Neighbours 30th: The Stars Reunite, which aired in Australia and the UK in March 2015.

In 2016, McLachlan appeared in the sci-fi thriller Restoration, playing Andrew Majury.

== Sexual harassment allegations ==
On 8 January 2018, a joint investigation by Fairfax Media and the Australian Broadcasting Corporation (ABC) reported that McLachlan had been accused of sexual harassment by several actresses during his performing career. Three actresses from the 2014 Australian production of The Rocky Horror Show – Christie Whelan Browne, Erika Heynatz and Angela Scundi – made allegations against McLachlan. He responded,

frankly, they seem to be simple inventions, perhaps made for financial reasons, perhaps to gain notoriety. In either event, they are to the best of my knowledge utterly and entirely false.

McLachlan subsequently left the 2018 production of The Rocky Horror Show. Victoria Police announced they were investigating complaints from two of the women.

McLachlan filed defamation suits against the ABC and Fairfax Media in February 2018; he also named Whelan Browne in a defamation suit. Producers of The Doctor Blake Mysteries announced that production would be temporarily suspended pending the outcome of investigations. The production company, December Media, "cleared the actor of any misconduct" during the show's run. In April, it was announced McLachlan would not be returning to the series.

McLachlan's defamation case was due to be heard in the Supreme Court of New South Wales from 4 February 2019; however, the suit was postponed pending the outcome of the related criminal proceedings. On 11 January 2019, Victoria Police charged him with one count of common assault, eight counts of indecent assault and one count of attempted indecent assault. At a hearing in April 2019 it came to light that one of the indecent assault charges had been dropped and that the case would be determined by a magistrate alone. In November 2019, a contested hearing of the charges began, with Stuart Littlemore as defence lawyer.

The magistrate described McLachlan's evidence as contrived and his emotions as "not seeming genuine", also characterising the women who gave evidence as "brave and honest witnesses". The magistrate also said that McLachlan likely touched the women while they were performing, but that she [the magistrate] was not persuaded beyond a reasonable doubt he knew they were not consenting. During the course of the trial, McLachlan's lawyers argued:

there was an overtly sexualised atmosphere among all cast members during the show that included crude physical pranks, hugs and kisses instead of saying hello and goodbye, actors sitting on each other's laps, a constant stream of dirty jokes and insincere remarks about their admiration and love for each other.

The hearing ended on 15 December 2020 with McLachlan acquitted on all charges, and McLachlan subsequently received $500,000 in costs from Victoria Police to pay his legal fees.

In May 2021, Seven News' Spotlight program claimed that the ABC had "manipulated" McLachlan's accusers when it interviewed the women in 2018. The program showed ABC journalists (off camera) appearing to coach the accusers by offering specific words and phrases for them to say in their interview, such as "predatory" and "power imbalance". The ABC rejected those claims. McLachlan filed a defamation suit against the ABC and Nine newspapers over media reports of the 2014 Rocky Horror Show tour allegations for which he had been tried and acquitted. On 15 May 2021, fresh allegations were made about the actor's behaviour, including from Jeanne Downs, a former UK television star who accused the actor of groping her live while a guest on her popular children's show in 1990. McLachlan applied to discontinue the defamation suit ten days into the trial, on the same day the defence was set to begin calling witnesses, upon learning his acquittal in the criminal matter would be withheld from the jury.

== Personal life ==
McLachlan's partner is opera conductor Vanessa Scammell, whom he met in 2009. He has a child from his relationship with British actress and voice artist Charlotte Avery. McLachlan was briefly married to Karen Williams (fl. 1986), with whom he had attended the same secondary school. Subsequently, he was married to Neighbours actress Rachel Friend (1993–1994).

== Discography ==
=== Studio albums ===
List of studio albums, with selected chart positions and certifications
Title	Album details	Peak chart positions				Certification
Title	Album details	AUS	NLD	NZ	UK	Certification
Craig McLachlan & Check 1-2	Released: June 1990; Label: Epic	4	88	49	10	ARIA: Gold
Hands Free	Released: March 1992; Label: Epic	104	—	—	—	
Craig McLachlan & the Culprits	Released: October 28, 1996; Label: Roadrunner	—	—	—	—	

=== Musical albums ===
List of musical albums, with selected chart positions
Title	Album details	Peak chart positions
Title	Album details	UK
Grease (Original London Stage Cast Soundtrack)	Released: 1993; Label: Epic	20
The Rocky Horror Show (Australian Cast Recording)	Released: 1995; Label: TriStar Music	—

=== Singles ===
List of singles, with selected chart positions and certifications
Year	Single	Peak chart positions							Certification	Album
Year	Single	AUS	BEL	GER	IRE	NLD	NZ	UK	Certification	Album
1989	"Rock the Rock" (as Craig McLachlan & Check 1–2)	36	—	—	—	—	—	—		Craig McLachlan & Check 1–2
1990	"Mona" (as Craig McLachlan & Check 1–2)	3	8	44	5	26	16	2	ARIA: Platinum	Craig McLachlan & Check 1–2
1990	"Amanda" (as Craig McLachlan & Check 1–2)	24	—	—	16	—	22	19		Craig McLachlan & Check 1–2
1990	"I Almost Felt Like Crying" (as Craig McLachlan & Check 1–2)	103	—	—	—	—	—	50		Craig McLachlan & Check 1–2
1991	"On My Own"	23	—	—	—	—	—	59		Hands Free
1992	"One Reason Why"	57	—	—	—	—	—	29		Hands Free
1992	"I Hear You Knocking"	90	—	—	—	—	—	—		Hands Free
1992	"Time Warp" (with Australian cast)	—	—	—	—	—	—	—		The Rocky Horror Show Cast Recording
1993	"You're the One That I Want" (duet with Deborah Gibson)	—	—	—	24	—	—	13		Grease Cast Recording
1993	"Grease"	—	—	—	—	—	—	44		Grease Cast Recording
1995	"Everyday" (as Craig McLachlan & the Culprits)	—	—	—	—	—	—	65		Craig McLachlan & the Culprits
1995	"If We Were Angels" (as Craig McLachlan & the Culprits)	—	—	—	—	—	—	—		Craig McLachlan & the Culprits
1996	"Hear the World Cry" (as Craig McLachlan & the Culprits)	—	—	—	—	—	—	92		Craig McLachlan & the Culprits

=== Videos ===
- Craig McLachlan & Check 1–2: The Video (featured an interview and the video clips for "Mona", "Amanda", "Rock the Rock" and "I Almost Felt Like Crying") (1990)

== Filmography ==
=== Film ===
Year	Title	Role	Notes
1991	Heroes II: The Return	Lt. Walter Carey	TV film
1992	Mad Bomber in Love	The Whip	Feature film
1992	Absent Without Leave	James Edwards	Feature film
1996	Catherine the Great	Sergei Saltykov	TV film
2001	Let's Get Skase	Eric Carney	Feature film
2001	Cubbyhouse	Bill	Feature film
2001	Abschied in den Tod	Det. Const. Steve McNamara	TV film
2001	My Husband, My Killer	Warren Elkins	TV film
2002	Heroes' Mountain	Stuart Diver	TV film
2002	Superfire	Jack Skidder	TV film
2005	BlackJack: Ace Point Game	Michael Hasler	TV film
2005	Hating Alison Ashley	Jeff Kennard	Feature film
2005	The Great Raid	Lt. Riley	Feature film
2009	Amar a morir	Nick	Feature film
2011	Savages Crossing	Mory	Feature film
2012	The Last Match	Val	Short film
2016	Restoration	Andrew Majury	TV film

=== Television ===
Year	Title	Role	Notes
1986–1987	Sons and Daughters	Student	Guest role
1987–1989	Neighbours	Henry Ramsay	Main cast
1990–1991	Home and Away	Grant Mitchell	Main cast
1995–1997	Bugs	Ed	Main cast
1999	Tribe	Ralph Leyton	TV miniseries
2001–2002	Always Greener	Greg Graham	Recurring role
2004	Through My Eyes	Michael Chamberlain	TV miniseries
2004	McLeod's Daughters	Kane Morgan	Recurring role
2005	Supernova	Alistair Foster	Episode: "Unity"
2008	City Homicide	Leon Grasby	Episode: "Golden"
2008–2012	Packed to the Rafters	Steve Wilson	Recurring role
2009	The Cut	Dutch Holland	Episode: "A Falcon's Tail"
2010–2012	Lowdown	Ben Hollander	Episodes: "Wasp in Translation", "Ben Behaving Badly"
2011	Rescue: Special Ops	Hayden Bradley	Recurring role
2011	At Home with Julia	Steve	TV miniseries
2011	NCIS: Los Angeles	Clifford Bosworth	Episode: "Lone Wolf"
2013	Redfern Now	Jack	Episode: "Consequences"
2013–2014	House Husbands	Damo	Recurring role
2013–2017	The Doctor Blake Mysteries	Dr. Lucien Blake	Main cast
2016	Deep Water	Kyle "Hammers" Hampton	TV miniseries
2016	The Wrong Girl	Eric	Main cast

== Awards and nominations ==
Year	Association	Category	Work	Result	Ref
1991	ARIA Awards	Highest Selling Single	"Mona"	Won	
2014	Helpmann Awards	Best Male Actor in a Musical	Richard O'Brien's The Rocky Horror Show	Won	
1989	Logie Awards	Most Popular Actor	Neighbours	Won	
1990	Logie Awards	Most Popular Actor	Neighbours	Won	
1990	Logie Awards	Most Popular Personality on Australian Television	Neighbours	Won	
1991	Logie Awards	Most Popular Actor	Home and Away	Won	
2014	Logie Awards	Most Outstanding Actor	The Doctor Blake Mysteries	Nominated	
2015	Logie Awards	Most Popular Actor	The Doctor Blake Mysteries	Nominated	
2016	Logie Awards	Most Popular Actor	The Doctor Blake Mysteries	Nominated	
