= Craig McLachlan & Check 1-2 =

1990 album

Craig McLachlan & Check 1–2

Studio album by Craig McLachlan & Check 1–2
- Released: 11 June 1990
- Recorded: 1989–1990
- Genre: Soft rock; pop
- Label: CBS; Epic
- Producer: Garth Porter

Singles from Craig McLachlan & Check 1–2
- 1. "Rock the Rock" Released: 27 November 1989; 2. "Mona" Released: April 1990; 3. "Amanda" Released: July 1990; 4. "I Almost Felt Like Crying" Released: October 1990

Craig McLachlan & Check 1–2 is the debut album by Australian actor/musician Craig McLachlan as part of the three-piece band Craig McLachlan and Check 1-2.

== Background ==
From 1987–1989, McLachlan had played Henry Ramsay on Neighbours before joining the cast of Home and Away in February 1990 where he played Grant Mitchell.

In March, McLachlan won the Gold Logie at the Logie Awards of 1990. Concurrently, McLachlan was recording his debut album with his band, 'Check 1–2' and it was released during the height of his television exposure. The album was released in June 1990 and it produced four singles, including "Mona", which peaked at No. 2 in the UK and No. 3 in Australia.

== Track listing ==
No.	Title	Writer(s)	Length
1.	"Mona"	Ellas McDaniel	3:41
2.	"Rock the Rock"	Craig McLachlan; Garth Porter	3:47
3.	"I Almost Felt Like Crying"	McLachlan; Porter	3:35
4.	"Amanda"	McLachlan	3:25
5.	"What Is Love"	Porter	3:42
6.	"Jump into the Fire"	McLachlan; Porter	3:50
7.	"Bigger Than Texas"	McLachlan; Porter	3:13
8.	"Can't Take It Any Longer"	McLachlan; Rachel Friend	3:39
9.	"I Don't Mind"	McLachlan	3:28
10.	"Hot"	McLachlan; Porter	3:01
11.	"Go"	McLachlan	3:41
12.	"It's Been Good"	McLachlan; Porter	4:16

== Personnel ==
Adapted from the album's liner notes.

=== Musicians ===
- Craig McLachlan – vocals, guitar
- Mark Beckhouse – bass
- John Clark – percussion
- Mark Meyer – drums
- Garth Porter – keyboards
- Chong Lim – additional keyboards
- Roger McLachlan – fretless bass on "Go" and "Can't Take It Any Longer"
- David Williams – toms on "Mona"
- John Hinde, Lindsay Field, Nikki Nicholls, Lisa Edwards – backing vocals

=== Production ===
- Produced by Garth Porter
- Engineered by Chris Corr
- Additional engineers: David Price, Greg Henderson, Ted Howard
- Assistant engineers: Ian Hayes, Brendan Morley, Adrian Webb
- Mixed by Greg Henderson and Garth Porter, except "Bigger Than Texas" mixed by Ted Howard and Garth Porter
- Recorded at Platinum, Melbourne

== Charts ==
Craig McLachlan and Check 1–2 debuted at No. 5 in Australia on the week commencing 17 June 1990 and rose to No. 4 the following week. It remained in the top 50 for 13 weeks.

Chart (1990)	Peak position
Australian ARIA Albums Chart	4
Dutch Album Charts MegaCharts	88
New Zealand Albums Chart	49
UK Albums Chart	10

== Certification ==
Region	Certification	Certified units/sales
Australia (ARIA)	Gold	35,000^{^}
^{^} Shipments figures based on certification alone.

== The Video ==
Craig McLachlan & Check 1–2: The Video

Video by Craig McLachlan
- Released: 1990
- Label: CMV Enterprises

In 1990, a video was released which included the film clips to the four singles, as well as interviews with McLachlan and rare performances.

1. "Mona"
2. "Amanda"
3. "Rock the Rock"
4. "I Almost Felt Like Crying"
