= Juggernaut (Frank Marino album) =

Studio album by Frank Marino / Mahogany Rush
- Released: 1982
- Recorded: 1982
- Studios: Tempo Studios and Son Soleil, Montreal, Quebec, Canada
- Genres: Psychedelia; hard rock; blues rock
- Length: 44:27
- Label: Columbia
- Producer: Frank Marino

Frank Marino chronology
The Power of Rock 'n' Roll (1981)	Juggernaut (1982)	Full Circle (1986)

Professional ratings
Review scores
Source	Rating
Allmusic	3.5/5 stars

Juggernaut is the second solo studio album by Canadian rock guitarist Frank Marino, released in 1982. The original Mahogany Rush drummer Jimmy Ayoub was replaced by Timm Biery for this album.

A remastered version of Juggernaut and Marino's previous album The Power of Rock 'n' Roll was released on August 6, 2012, under the moniker Frank Marino & Mahogany Rush.

== Track listing ==
All songs by Frank Marino.

1. "Strange Dreams" - 5:05
2. "Midnight Highway" - 3:44
3. "Stories of a Hero" - 8:01
4. "Free" - 5:18
5. "Maybe It's Time - 6:06
6. "Ditch Queen" - 6:38
7. "For Your Love" - 4:36
8. "Juggernaut" - 4:59

== Personnel ==
- Frank Marino - lead guitar, keyboards, lead vocals
- Vince Marino - rhythm guitar
- Paul Harwood - bass
- Timm Biery - drums

== Charts ==
In Canada, the album peaked at #89. The album charted in the Billboard 200 chart, and peaked at 185. Strange Dreams charted at #9 on the Hot Mainstream Rock Tracks chart.
