= What's Next (album) =

Studio album by Mahogany Rush
- Released: 1980
- Recorded: 1979–1980
- Studio: Tempo Studios, Montreal, Quebec
- Length: 42:44
- Label: Columbia
- Producer: Frank Marino

Mahogany Rush chronology
Tales of the Unexpected (1979)	What's Next (1980)	The Power of Rock 'n' Roll (1981)

Professional ratings
Review scores
Source	Rating
Allmusic	2/5 stars
Record Mirror	3.5/5 stars

What's Next is an album by Frank Marino & Mahogany Rush, released in 1980, under Columbia Records. A bootleg CD edition of this album exists, taken from a vinyl source with additional live tracks recorded in Salinas, California, during the Juggernaut tour of 1983.

== Track listing ==
All songs by Frank Marino, except "Roadhouse Blues" written by Jim Morrison, Robby Krieger, Ray Manzarek, John Densmore; "Mona" written by Bo Diddley; "Rock Me Baby" written by B.B. King.

1. "You Got Livin" - 4:37
2. "Finish Line" - 4:08
3. "Rock Me Baby" - 4:48
4. "Something's Comin' Our Way" - 6:42
5. "Roadhouse Blues" - 5:25
6. "Loved by You" - 8:38
7. "Rock 'n' Roll Hall of Fame" - 4:03
8. "Mona" - 4:23

=== Bootleg CD edition live bonus tracks ===
1. "Midnight Highway" - 4:00
2. "Maybe It's Time" - 6:01
3. "Juggernaut" - 4:07
4. "Something's Coming Our Way" - 4:55
5. "Strange Dreams" - 6:32

== Personnel ==
- Frank Marino - lead guitar, lead vocals
- Paul Harwood - bass guitar
- Jimmy Ayoub - drums and percussion
- Vince Marino - rhythm guitar

== Charts ==
Country	Date	Peak position
CAN	1980	70
US	1980	88
