= Retrofit (album) =

Studio album by Section 25
- Released: 2010
- Genre: Techno, alternative dance, electronic, post-punk
- Label: LTM Recordings

Section 25 chronology
Nature + Degree (2009)	Retrofit (2010)	Dark Light (2013)

Professional ratings
Review scores
Source	Rating
AllMusic	4/5 stars
Uncut	3/5 stars

Retrofit is an album by Blackpool post-punk/electro band Section 25 and released by LTM Recordings on 14 September 2010.

== Overview ==
The album contains nine re-recordings of tracks spanning their entire history, as well as a new song entitled "Über Hymn" and a remix of "Looking From A Hilltop" by Stephen Morris. The project was initially started prior to founder and bassist Larry Cassidy's death in 2010 and contains vocal excerpts from his last studio sessions at West Orange Studios (from July 2009 onwards), as well as daughter Bethany Cassidy on new vocals.

== Track listing ==
1. "The Process" (5.31)
2. "Looking From A Hilltop" (6.05)
3. "Beating Heart" (4.24)
4. "Desert" (5.16)
5. "Über Hymn" (3.55)
6. "Garageland" (4.55)
7. "Dirty Disco" (5.34)
8. "Girls Don't Count" (5.27)
9. "New Horizon" (6.02)
10. "Wretch" (4.15)
11. "Another Hilltop" (remixed by Stephen Morris) (9.18)

== Personnel ==
- Larry Cassidy – vocals
- Bethany Cassidy – vocals
- Vincent Cassidy – drums, percussion, vocals
- Stuart Hill – bass, programming, backing vocals
- Steven Stringer – guitar, programming, sequencing
