= The Key of Dreams =

Studio album by Section 25
- Released: May 1982
- Genre: Post-punk
- Label: Factory
- Producer: Section 25

Section 25 chronology
Always Now (1981)	The Key of Dreams (1982)	From the Hip (1984)

Professional ratings
Review scores
Source	Rating
AllMusic	2.5/5 stars
Trouser Press	ambiguous

The Key of Dreams is the second studio album by the English post-punk band Section 25, released in May 1982 by Factory Benelux. It was reissued in 1991 with extra tracks by LTM Recordings.

== Critical reception ==
Andy Kellman for AllMusic described it as "influenced by dub, Krautrock, and '60s psychedelia (and, yes, probably Joy Division as well)" and "sunken in a glum, mid-tempo pit of dejection." Steve Grant and Ira Robbins in Trouser Press describe it as "nine examinations of paranoia and anxiety, using lurking glissandi, curious touches of Doorsish piano and Oriental philosophy."

== Track listing ==
All tracks composed by Section 25

Side 1

1. "Always Now" 1:50
2. "Visitation" 3:22
3. "Regions" 3:55
4. "The Wheel" 4:07
5. "No Abiding Place" 5:25
6. "Once Before" 2:48

Side 2

1. "There Was a Time" 5:26
2. "Wretch" 1:55
3. "Sutra" 15:00

Bonus tracks

1. "The Beast" 8:04
2. "Sakura" 3:46 produced by Be Music (New Order)
3. "Je Veux Ton Amour" 5:16 produced by Martin Hannett
4. "Sakura" (Matrix Mix) 5:23 produced by Be Music (New Order)
5. "Hold Me" 5:45
