= Retrofit (company) =

American weight loss company

- Type: Private
- Industry: Weight Loss, Weight Management, and Nutrition
- Founded: Chicago, Illinois, 2011
- Headquarters: Chicago, Illinois
- Key people: Jeff Hyman; Founder & CEO
- Number of employees: 80
- Website: www.retrofitme.com

Retrofit is a weight loss company for business professionals based in Chicago, Illinois. It is known for its use of technology to help people with weight loss and track their progress. Technologies used include Skype (for clients to speak with program advisers and wellness experts), Wi-Fi scales, and Fitbit. Wellness experts include a registered dietitian, exercise physiologist, and behavior coach to cover the core subject matter areas of nutrition, fitness, and behavior change.

Retrofit uses the measure of percent of body weight lost at the end of one year as their primary metric and claims a greater than 90% rate of weight loss for their active client base.

== History ==
Retrofit was founded by Jeff Hyman in 2011. The initial idea for the company came from his personal experience with weight gain. He founded the company after consulting with dietitians, nutritionists, therapists, and doctors over a two-year period following his experience at a weight loss resort.

== Growth ==
In the first two years of operation, the company tripled its workforce and secured clients such as Accretive Health, Dolby Laboratories, Salesforce.com, and former players of the NFLPA. The company has also raised $10.7 million in capital from investors such as J. B. Pritzker, Larry Levy, and Draper Fisher Jurvetson.

The company ran a nationwide contest in 2013 in which they gave away $300,000 in services. Salt Lake City-based company VISTA Staffing Solutions was the recipient of the services after their content essay was chosen from those who entered. They were also named one of the 50 Hottest Health And Fitness Apps by TechCrunch in 2012.

== Program ==
The program offered by the company is personalized for each individual and is also offered as part of weight loss programs for certain corporations. It is said to be focused on professionals who are too busy to take time off work to attend weight loss clinics or resorts.

Each client is partnered with individuals to help them with their progress, including a dietitian, exercise physiologist, a program manager, and a behavior coach. Interaction between clients and the professionals is done online through services such as Skype. The progress of each client is monitored electronically through Fitbit and a scale enabled through Wi-Fi.
