= Mahogany Rush =

Canadian rock band

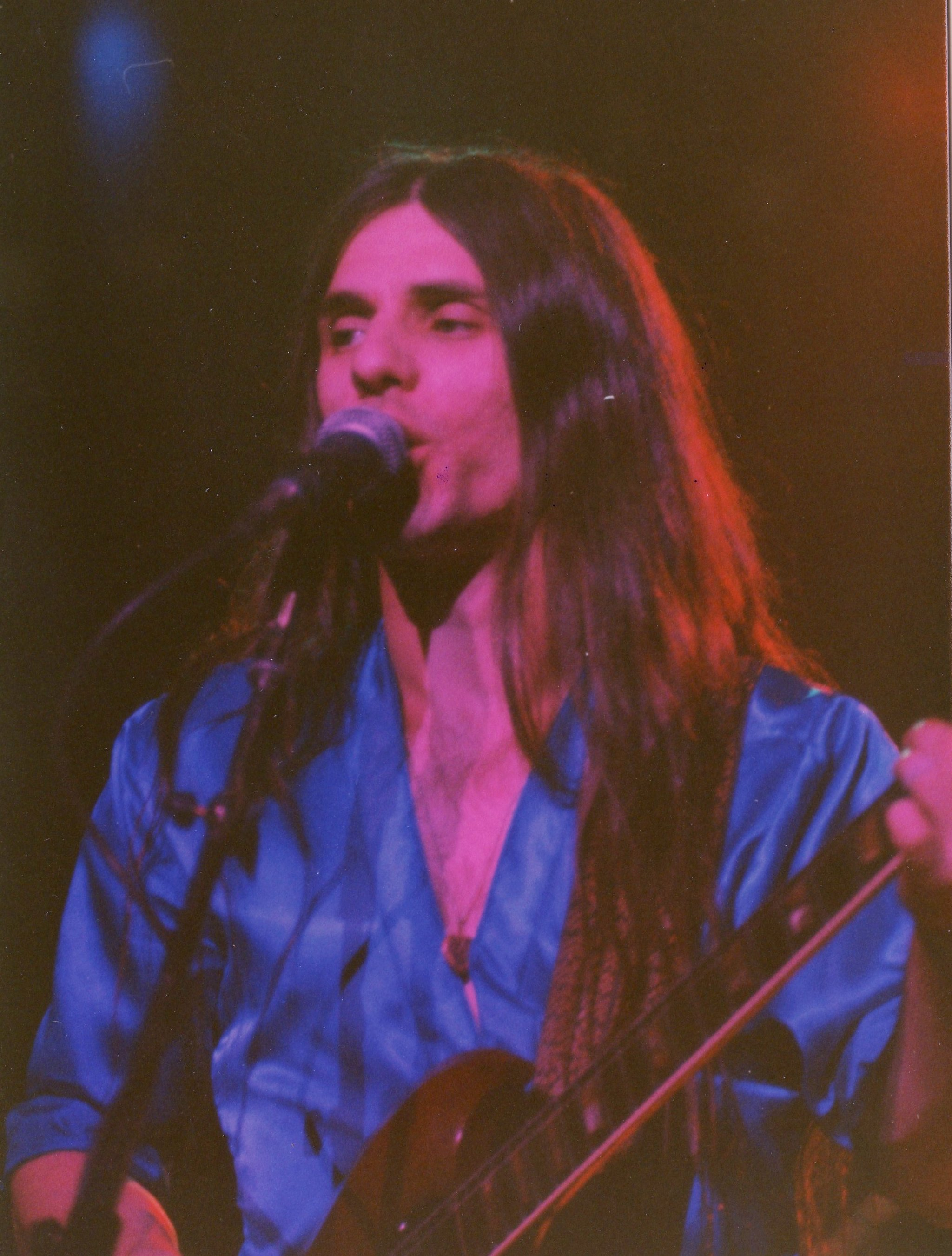
- Scene from a performance in 1983

Background information
- Also known as: Frank Marino & Mahogany Rush (1980–2021)
- Origin: Montreal, Quebec, Canada
- Genres: Heavy metal; hard rock; acid rock; blues rock; psychedelic rock
- Years active: 1969–2021
- Labels: Nine Records, 20th Century Fox Records, Columbia Records, Just a Minute Records
- Members: Frank Marino; Dave Goode; Mick Layne; Avi Ludmer; Mark Weber
- Past members: Paul Harwood; Jimmy Ayoub; Phil Bech; Johnny McDiarmid; Vince Marino; Timm Biery; Claudio Daniel Pesavento; Peter Dowse; Josh Trager
- Website: www.mahoganyrush.com

Mahogany Rush was a Canadian rock band led by guitarist Frank Marino. Formed in Montreal, Quebec in 1969, the band had its peak of popularity in the mid-1970s, playing venues as large as California Jam II.

The band is perhaps best known for Marino's soaring lead guitar which bears a strong resemblance to the playing of Jimi Hendrix. Long-term members of the band have included bassist Paul Harwood and drummer Jimmy Ayoub, and in the later days, Frank's brother Vince on guitar; Frank Marino is the sole continuous member of the band. Starting in the late 1970s, the group recorded and toured as Frank Marino & Mahogany Rush.

== Musical style ==
Marino has described the band's sound as "The Grateful Dead meets jazz".

== Beginnings ==
In an effort to gain press attention, the original record company created a fictional story that Frank Marino, prior to starting the band, had spent time in a mental institution after taking LSD and was visited by Jimi Hendrix in a vision.

Over time, the band migrated to a larger and more financially supported record company and achieved its greatest radio hit success with the song "Strange Dreams". The single "A New Rock & Roll" reached No. 70 on the Canadian charts. It also reached No. 88 on the Cash Box Top 100 chart.

== Band members ==
Final line-up

- Frank Marino – vocals, guitars, keyboards (1969–2021)
- Mick Layne – guitars (2000–2021)
- Avi Ludmer – violin, guitars (2004–2021)
- Dave Goode – drums (1992–2001, 2005–2021)
- Mark Weber – bass (2008–2021)

Former

- Paul Harwood – bass (1969–1986)
- Jimmy Ayoub – drums, percussion (1970–1982; died 2023)
- Phil Bech – piano (1969–1974)
- Johnny McDiarmid – keyboards (1970–1974)
- Vince Marino – guitars (1980–2000)
- Timm Biery – drums (1982–1991)
- Claudio Daniel Pesavento – keyboards (1982–1989)
- Josh Trager – drums (2001–2005)
- Peter Dowse – bass (1986–2008)

== Discography ==
Studio albums

- 1972 Maxoom (CAN No. 76) (US No. 159)
- 1974 Child of the Novelty (CAN No. 83) (US No. 74)
- 1975 Strange Universe (US No. 84)
- 1976 Mahogany Rush IV (US No. 175)
- 1977 World Anthem (US No. 184)
- 1979 Tales of the Unexpected (CAN No. 57) (US No. 129)
- 1980 What's Next (CAN No. 70) (US No. 88)
- 1981 The Power of Rock 'n' Roll (Note: Originally released as Frank Marino solo albums and later re-released under the moniker Frank Marino & Mahogany Rush.)
- 1982 Juggernaut (CAN No. 89) (US No. 185)
- 1986 Full Circle
- 1990 From the Hip
- 2000 Eye of the Storm

Others

- 1978 Live (CAN No. 67) (US No. 129)
- 1988 Double Live
- 1995 Child of the Novelty / Maxoom / Strange Universe
- 1996 Dragonfly – The best of Frank Marino & Mahogany Rush
- 2004 Real Live! (double album)
- 2005 Full Circle (remaster)
- 2005 From the Hip (remaster)
- 2008 Mahogany Rush IV / World Anthem (remaster)
- 2009 Mahogany Rush Live / Tales of the Unexpected / What's Next (remaster)
- 2012 The Power of Rock and Roll / Juggernaut (remaster)
