= Section 25 (band) =

English post-punk and electronic band

- Origin: Poulton-le-Fylde, England
- Genres: Post-punk; dance; electronic; alternative rock
- Years active: 1977–1988; 2001–present
- Labels: Factory; LTM; Factory Benelux
- Members: Vincent Cassidy; Stephen Stringer
- Past members: Larry Cassidy; Ian Butterworth; Angela Carpenter; Stuart Hill; Jenny Ross; Lee Shallcross; Paul Wiggin; Roger Wikeley; Bethany Cassidy; Joanna Cassidy; Michael Cassidy
- Website: section25.com

Section 25 are an English post-punk and electronic band, best known for the 1984 single "Looking from a Hilltop", associated with Manchester record label Factory Records.

== History ==
=== Early recordings 1977–1982 (Always Now to Key of Dreams) ===
Section 25 formed in Poulton-le-Fylde near Blackpool, Lancashire, in November 1977. Initially the band was a duo, consisting of brothers Larry Cassidy (bass, vocals) and Vincent Cassidy (drums). In June 1978 they made their live debut with Phil Denton on guitar; he was replaced in November by Paul Wiggin. June 1979 saw the Cassidy brothers promote a charity gig in aid of International Year of the Child at Blackpool Imperial Hotel, featuring Section 25 and other local bands as well as Joy Division and Orchestral Manoeuvres in the Dark. As a result, Section 25 were invited to play at the Russell Club in Manchester, and joined Factory Records.

Their debut 7″, "Girls Don't Count", was released in July 1980 on Factory Records, produced by Ian Curtis and Rob Gretton. All Section 25 releases would be released through either Factory Records (until the demise of that label), or sister imprint Factory Benelux. Their debut LP, Always Now, appeared in 1981 and was produced by Martin Hannett at Britannia Row studio. The pochette sleeve was among the most expensive and elaborate in the label's history (designed by Peter Saville) utilising an exclusive 'marble' effect design printed on the inner jacket and a fold-out cover that resembled a match-book similar to the cover used by Cabaret Voltaire for their 2x45 album.

The three-piece group played many gigs in Britain and Northern Europe between 1979 and 1981, both as a headline act and with other Factory Records artists, such as Joy Division, A Certain Ratio, Blurt, The Durutti Column, Crispy Ambulance and New Order. The group also released a self-produced second album, The Key of Dreams. However, the original line-up split in September 1981 shortly after Paul Wiggin declined to fly to a concert in Helsinki supporting New Order, swallowing up most of their fee as allowed by travelling overland. With a North American tour already planned, his fear of flying made his departure inevitable. Factory label boss Tony Wilson then tried and failed to recruit then-unknown guitarist Johnny Marr as a replacement.

Abandoning much of the existing live set, the Cassidy brothers prepared for an upcoming European tour with backing tapes and an extra percussionist John Grice. Following a warm-up date in London, the group visited Belgium, Holland and Germany in January 1982 in tandem with Factory labelmates Crispy Ambulance. The band then undertook their first North American tour, albeit restricted to the East Coast.

=== 1983–2006 (From The Hip to Love & Hate) ===
Joined by percussionist Lee Shallcross, Section 25 gradually evolved with a more electronic-dance direction, a process which culminated in the album From the Hip and remix single "Looking From A Hilltop", both released in 1984 and produced by Bernard Sumner of New Order. This second version of the band also featured the Cassidy brothers' sister Angela Flowers (vocals, keyboards) and Larry Cassidy's wife Jenny Ross (vocals, keyboards). The five-piece completed a lengthy second tour of North America in January 1985, where the single "Looking From A Hilltop" achieved a measure of club success.

Later in 1985 the single "Crazy Wisdom" emerged on Factory Benelux as a 12", but the group again splintered, leaving husband-and-wife team Larry Cassidy and Jenny Ross to complete a fourth album, Love & Hate, finally released by Factory in 1988. Bad News Week was also released as a 12" single, remixed by Bernard Sumner. Section 25 then fell silent for more than a decade, although their entire back catalogue was reissued on CD on LTM as well as an archive DVD, So Far. There have also been several live and rarity CDs released by the same label.

In 2001 the band regrouped and started composing new material. It was originally expected that this would form the basis for a new album, but these plans were derailed when Jenny Ross, after a long fight with cancer, died on 20 November 2004 at age 42. The LTM DVD So Far, an audio-visual history of the band released in January 2005, was dedicated to her memory.

=== 2006–2009 (Part-Primitiv to Nature and Degree) ===
Now with Ian Butterworth (formerly of fellow Factory act Tunnelvision) on guitar and Roger Wikeley on bass and keyboards, the Cassidy brothers performed their first live show in nearly two decades at their hometown Poulton-Le-Fylde in May 2006 followed by dates in Blackpool, Paris, Brussels, Leicester, London and Athens.

A new studio album by the quartet, Part-Primitiv, was released by LTM in April 2007, together with Communicants, a DVD assembled from live performances in 2006. Larry and Vin Cassidy also featured in the 2006 Factory documentary film Shadowplayers, and a BBC television documentary on the label. The group performed at the Plan K venue in Brussels in December 2007 as part of the Factory Night (Once Again) event, being joined onstage by Peter Hook of New Order for a cover of "Temptation". It was then proposed that Hook and Section 25 play further shows together, performing a mixture of Section 25, Joy Division and New Order songs.

Roger Wikeley left Section 25 in 2008 and was replaced by Stephen Stringer. In November this revised line-up played with Peter Hook in Paris, Brussels, Oss in the southern Netherlands and Krefeld in North Rhine-Westphalia, Germany. Ian Butterworth parted company with the Section 25 at the end of the year. Stephen Stringer moved on to guitar and Section 25's sound engineer and programmer Stuart Hill moved on to bass guitar. Both were no strangers to Larry and Vin, who had helped them record demos in 1983 and 1985.

The band released a new album in 2009 called Nature + Degree through LTM Recordings. Several tracks featured vocals by Bethany Cassidy, daughter of Larry and Jenny, who joined the group as co-vocalist and keyboards player. Section 25 appeared at the "Factory Night (And Then Again)" event at Plan K on 12 December 2009, with Beth and Larry sharing vocals. The group also returned to the States for festival dates in Los Angeles and San Francisco.

On 27 February 2010, it was announced that founding member, singer, and bass player for the group, Larry Cassidy, had died at the age of 56. His cause of death was later described as "heart failure brought on by a blood clot".

=== 2010–present (Retrofit to Elektra) ===
Prior to Larry Cassidy's death, the band had completed work on a new album, Retrofit, which was released on 14 September 2010. The album features electro reworkings and updates of previously issued Section 25 tracks, as well as one new song "Über Hymn". The album closes with a new version of Looking From A Hilltop, produced and arranged by Stephen Morris of New Order.

Limited copies came with an extra CD of a 16-minute recording of Larry Cassidy reading selected lyrics of Joy Division's Ian Curtis. This was recorded in January 2010 and would be Larry's last visit to a recording studio.

The band opted to continue to perform with their current line up. Section 25 played the FAC251 club in Manchester on 20 November 2010, and in 2011 issued their first new release without Larry Cassidy, a download-only EP titled "Invicta" EP, via Hacienda Records. June 2012 saw a deluxe vinyl reissue of From the Hip (Fact 90), issued as a special edition on Factory Records with 'remixed' artwork by Peter Saville, as well as a split coloured-vinyl 12" with Stereograph featuring two dub versions of "Colour Movement Sex and Violence" and "Inner Drive".

Saville also provided the cover image and title for their eighth studio album, Dark Light, issued on the Factory Benelux imprint in February 2013. "My Outrage" was also released as a 7″ single. Also released during the same period were the 10" single "Invicta Max" (an expansion of the 2011 EP of the same name) and the official remix album "Eigengrau", featuring numerous remixes of earlier Section 25 recordings by Zoviet France, Absolute Body Control, Portion Control and Renaldo and the Loaf among others.

In May 2014, the group issued an expanded 30th anniversary CD edition of From the Hip via Factory Benelux, with a bonus disc featuring original demos as well as a BBC radio session from 1984 plus a new recording of "Reflection". Both Bernard Sumner and Jon Savage contributed liner notes. The new version of "Reflection" (subtitled 'Young Image') was also issued as a limited edition orange vinyl 7" single to mark Record Store Day in April 2014. On Record Store Day the band performed in Manchester with Factory peers Crispy Ambulance and Minny Pops. A review of the show in The Guardian described Section 25 as "a revelation" and "the best new/old band in Britain."

In April 2015, Section 25 released "Mirror", another limited edition 7″ single for Record Store Day, with guest vocals by Simon Topping, formerly of A Certain Ratio. The song dated from 1980 but had never before been recorded in the studio. Both the song and the packaging complemented a new CD edition of Always Now, re-mastered and featuring a bonus disc with their 1981 John Peel radio session as well as a complete live concert from 1980. The packaging replicated the original wraparound cover designed by Peter Saville.

In 2016, the group released a new live album, Alfresco, as a vinyl and CD package to mark Record Store Day in April and played a short series of live dates to coincide with its release. That same year the track "Hit" from their 1981 album Always Now was sampled by Kanye West on a new song, "FML", featured on his seventh studio album, The Life of Pablo.

In December 2017, the band announced on their Facebook page that they were working on a new album, and June 2018 saw the release of the eleven-track Elektra, recorded at West Orange Studios during the early part of the same year. The album featured appearances by original guitarist Paul Wiggin and newest family member Michael Cassidy on bass. One of the tracks, "FML", is an acoustic cover of the Kanye West track that sampled the band's "Hit".

== Discography ==
- 1981: Always Now
- 1982: The Key of Dreams
- 1984: From the Hip
- 1988: Love & Hate
- 2007: Part-Primitiv
- 2009: Nature + Degree
- 2010: Retrofit
- 2013: Dark Light
- 2018: Elektra
- 2020: Duette
- 2021: Jams from the Bardo
- 2022: Hymns from the Bardo
- 2024: Move On
