= From the Hip (Section 25 album) =

- LTM CD reissue sleeve

Studio album by Section 25
- Released: March 1984
- Recorded: 1983
- Studio: Rockfield Studios, Monmouthshire
- Genre: Synth-pop, alternative dance; electronic; post-punk
- Length: 38:08
- Label: Factory
- Producer: Bernard Sumner

Section 25 chronology
The Key of Dreams (1982)	From the Hip (1984)	Love & Hate (1988)

Singles from From the Hip
- 1. "Looking from a Hilltop" Released: June 1984

Professional ratings
Review scores
Source	Rating
AllMusic	3/5 stars

From the Hip is the third studio album by the English post-punk and electronic band Section 25, released in March 1984 by Factory Records. Following on from their previous studio albums, Always Now (1981) and The Key of Dreams (1982), it marked a major departure in terms of sound and scope. Abandoning their harsh original post-punk sound the band embarked upon a new journey into the realms of electronic and dance music, with the help of Bernard Sumner of New Order who co-produced the album at Rockfield Studios in Monmouthshire, Wales.

The album features subtle yet warm and atmospheric electronic tracks, such as "The Process" and "Inspiration", as well as the electro-style "Looking from a Hilltop" and the lighter synth-pop of "Reflection". "Looking from a Hilltop" was remixed by Bernard Sumner and Donald Johnson of A Certain Ratio for single release, with the lengthy "Megamix" version becoming an underground club hit, later sampled by both electronic dance music artists Orbital and the Shamen, and also described as "legendary" by Pitchfork. It was also the first track on Factory Records dance retrospective FAC. Dance.

The album was marketed by Factory Records in ten regions worldwide and very nearly resulted in a major label deal with Warner Brothers.

== Artwork ==
The artwork by Peter Saville and Trevor Key for the album featured a colour-based code that was present on a set of climbing poles on the album's sleeve. The band name and/or album title are spelled out using the same colour code that Saville used on New Order's releases from the same period, including Power, Corruption & Lies, "Blue Monday" and "Confusion".

== Reissues ==
LTM Recordings reissued the album on CD in 1998 with a number of bonus tracks. One of the bonus tracks (the 12" remix of "Beating Heart") contains an early example of the Roland TB-303 producing an acid house style bassline several years before its popularity in club music. A double vinyl edition appeared in 2012 under the Factory Records imprint, with artwork enhanced by Peter Saville. In May 2014 an expanded 30th anniversary 2xCD edition was issued by Factory Benelux, with a bonus disc featuring original demos as well as a BBC radio session from 1984 plus a new recording of Reflection. Both Bernard Sumner and Jon Savage contributed liner notes. The new version of Reflection (subtitled 'Younger Image') was also issued as a limited edition orange vinyl 7" single to mark Record Store Day in April 2014.

== Track listing ==
=== UK Factory release ===
1. "The Process" – 5:24
2. "Looking from a Hilltop" – 4:23
3. "Reflection" – 4:44
4. "Prepare to Live" – 3:38
5. "Program for Light" – 4:00
6. "Desert" – 3:28
7. "Beneath the Blade" – 4:16
8. "Inspiration" – 8:15

=== 1998 LTM reissue ===
1. "The Process" – 5:24
2. "Looking from a Hilltop" – 4:23
3. "Reflection" – 4:44
4. "Prepare to Live" – 3:38
5. "Program for Light" – 4:00
6. "Desert" – 3:28
7. "Beneath the Blade" – 4:16
8. "Inspiration" – 8:15
9. "Looking from a Hilltop" (Restructure) – 4:38
10. "Looking from a Hilltop" (Megamix) – 8:08
11. "Dirty Disco II" – 5:28
12. "Dirty Disco II" (Pre-Mix) – 4:03
13. "Beating Heart" (12 Inch Remix) – 5:05
14. "Back to Wonder" (12 Inch Version) – 3:20
15. "Beating Heart" (12 Inch Version) – 5:10

"Dirty Disco II" is a harsh electronic reworking of "Dirty Disco" from the band's debut album, Always Now.

=== 2014 Factory Benelux release ===
Disc 1

same tracks as 1998 LTM release

Disc 2

1. "Looking From a Hilltop" (1984 BBC session)
2. "Reflection" (1984 BBC session)
3. "Warhead" (1984 BBC session)
4. "The Process" (1983 demo)
5. "Looking from a Hilltop" (1983 demo)
6. "Prepare to Live" (1983 demo)
7. "Reflection" (1983 demo)
8. "Desert" (1983 demo)
9. "Program for Light" (1984 vocal mix)
10. "Another Hilltop" (Stephen Morris Remix)
11. "Reflection" (Young Image)
