= From the Hip (Frank Marino album) =

Studio album by Frank Marino / Mahogany Rush
- Released: 1990
- Studios: Starbase Studio, Montreal, Quebec, Canada
- Genres: Hard rock; blues rock; jazz fusion
- Length: 48:21
- Label: Par Excellence Music
- Producer: Frank Marino

Frank Marino chronology
Full Circle (1986)	From the Hip (1990)	Dragonfly - The Best of Frank Marino & Mahogany Rush (1997)

Professional ratings
Review scores
Source	Rating
Allmusic	3/5 stars

From the Hip is an album by Frank Marino released in 1990, under Par Excellence Music. The album shows Marino's usual style of guitar-driven hard rock, including elements of funk and blues, and an 11-minute jazz fusion/arena rock instrumental: "Rise Above".

The album was reissued in CD in 1993 by the German label SPV and in 2005 by Just a Minute! Records under the moniker Frank Marino & Mahogany Rush.

== Track listing ==
All music is composed by Frank Marino.

No.	Title	Length
1.	"Babylon Revisited"	5:23
2.	"I'm Ready"	3:37
3.	"How Long"	3:59
4.	"Rise Above"	11:37
5.	"Mine All Mine"	4:15
6.	"Ride My Own Wave"	5:55
7.	"The Stand"	6:34
8.	"The Wall Came Down"	6:57

Remastered 2005 CD issue bonus track

No.	Title	Length
9.	"Hingston Nights"	16:53

== Personnel ==
- Frank Marino - guitar, vocals, arranger
- Vince Marino - rhythm guitar
- Peter Dowse - bass, cover art
- Timm Biery - drums
- Claudio Pesavento - keyboards

Additional personnel

- Alan Jordan - vocals (background)
- Rob Howell - rhythm guitar on track 6
- Rob Heaney - engineer
