= Retrofit Films =

US film production company

- Industry: Entertainment
- Founded: 2004
- Founder: Chris Hanada; Tanner Kling
- Headquarters: Los Angeles, CA
- Products: Web series Branded entertainment
- Website: retrofitfilms.com

Retrofit Films is a production company located in Los Angeles, California, that develops and produces digital media and entertainment.

== History ==
Retrofit Films was founded by Chris Hanada and Tanner Kling in 2004. Starting in 2006, the company began creating companion Web series for television shows. After graduating from Loyola Marymount University’s film school, Hanada and Kling began their careers working at Tom Cruise and Paula Wagner’s C/W Productions on films such as Mission: Impossible 2 and Vanilla Sky, where they contributed to script and story development, research, production and promotion. Hanada and Kling are members of the Producers Guild of America.

== Overview ==
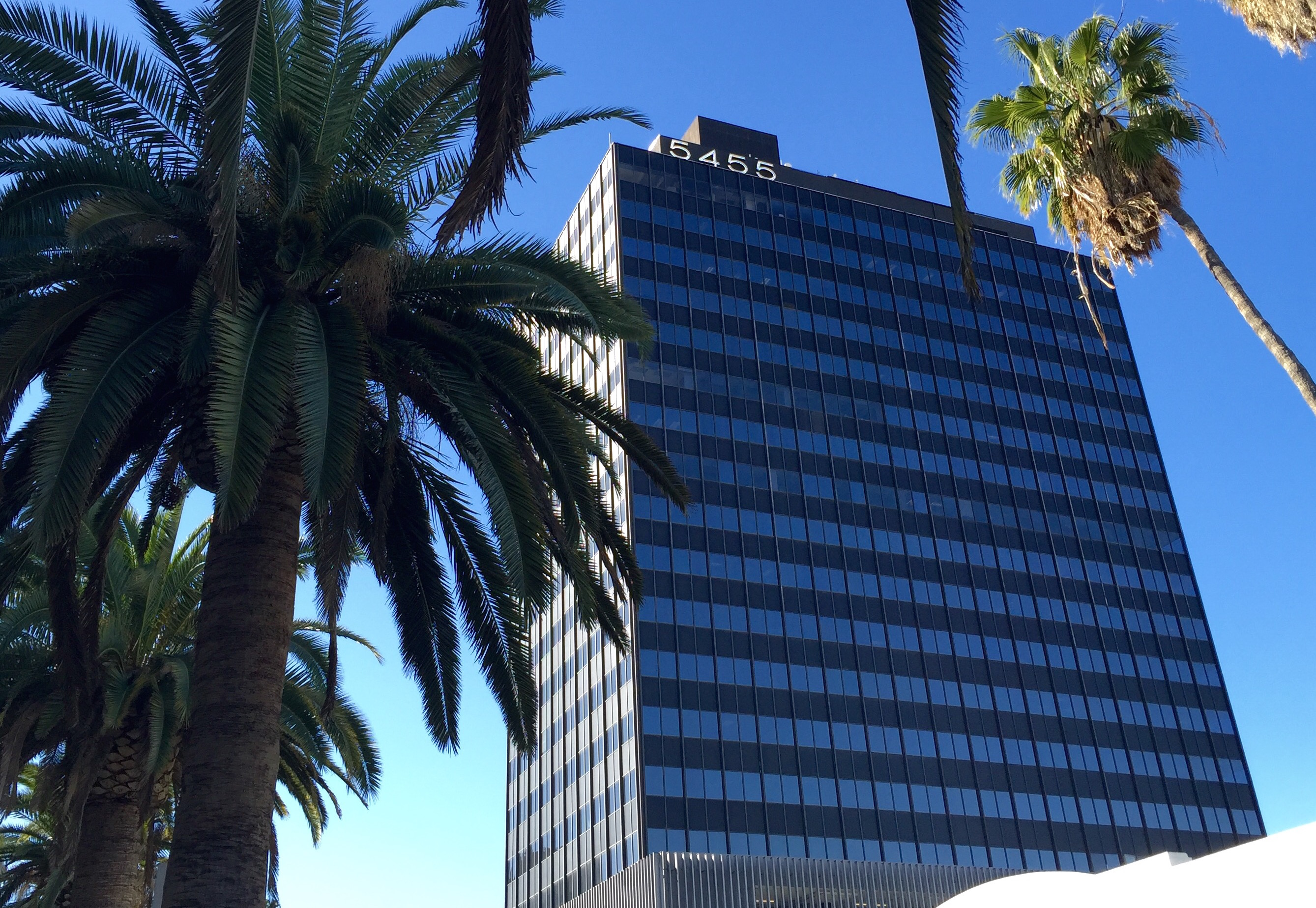
Retrofit Films headquarters in LA

=== Television and new media ===
Retrofit Films produces new media projects for television networks, movie studios and advertising brands, including animated and live-action web series, DVD featurettes, mobisodes and gameisodes.

The company created three Web series for NBC's Heroes, entitled Going Postal, The Recruit and Nowhere Man, featuring characters from the series. The Recruit was nominated for two 2009 Webby Awards. They also created Kara & The Chronicles of Krypton, an animated Web series for The CW Network's's Smallville; the 4-episode companion Web series A Darker Truth for The CW's Vampire Diaries; a Web series for Gossip Girl entitled Gossip Girl: Real New York Stories Revealed; and a companion Web series for NBC's My Own Worst Enemy called Conspiracy Theory. Other projects include a 13-part series of 3-minute "appisodes" for the iPhone, iPad and iPod Touch for the INHouse app for Fox's House in 2010, and 10 on-air/Web Sprint New Media Episodes in 2009 for Heroes entitled Slow Burn. In 2012, Retrofit worked with Marvel on Marvel Mash-Up, a series of interstitials taking footage from classic Marvel animated series and re-editing them in a humorous way. They originally aired on Disney XD and online. In 2015, Retrofit produced the 6-chapter Web series Dark Matters, a prequel to the television miniseries Heroes Reborn, with all six chapters directed by Kling. In 2016, the company executive produced This Isn't Working, a five-part short-form digital series starring Lisa Schwartz, and in 2017 executive produced The Off Season, a five-part short-form digital series starring Robert Belushi and Erica Rhodes, both for ABC.

The company's client list includes NBCUniversal, Sprint, Mindshare, Ogilvy & Mather, Edelman, The CW, ABC, Warner Bros., Marvel, DreamWorks and AOL.

=== Publishing division ===
In 2015, Retrofit Films launched a science fiction publishing division, Retrofit Publishing, which was renamed Axiomatic Publishing in 2016. In 2015, Retrofit Publishing put out First Fleet, a collection of serialized novellas by Stephen Case; and The Rewind Files, playwright Claire Willett's debut novel.

== Awards ==
- The Recruit
  - Winner of Two People's Voice Webby Awards: People's Voice, Online Film & Video, Best Series, 2009; People's Voice, Online Film & Video, Best Individual Episode, 2009
  - Winner of Silver Telly Award: Online Video, 2009
- Conspiracy Theory
  - Winner of Bronze Telly Award: Online Entertainment, 2009
- Nurse Jeffrey: Bitch Tapes
  - Nominee, Golden Reel Award: Best Sound Editing – Computer Episodic Entertainment, 2011
- Insidious: Spectral Sightings
  - Nominee, Golden Reel Award: Best Sound Editing – Computer Episodic Entertainment, 2014
- Heroes Reborn: Dark Matters – "Chapter Two: Phoebe"
  - Winner, Writers Guild Award: Adapted Short Form New Media, 2016
- Agents of S.H.I.E.L.D.: Academy
  - Nominee, Producers Guild of America Award for Outstanding Digital Series, 2016

== Notable Projects ==
Year	Title	Role	Notes
2008	Going Postal	Producer	Original Web series for Heroes (NBC)
2008	The Recruit	Producer	Original Web series for Heroes; winner of two 2009 Webby Awards; winner of 2009 Silver Telly Award
2008	Conspiracy Theory	Producer, director	Original Web series for My Own Worst Enemy (NBC)
2008	Kara & The Chronicles of Krypton	Producer, director, writers	Original Web series for Smallville (The CW)
2008	Smallville Season 7 DVD	Producer	
2008	Heroes Season 2 DVD	Producer	Select featurettes
2009	Slow Burn	Director	Broadcast and Web-branded series for Sprint and Heroes
2009	The Vampire Diaries: A Darker Truth	Producer, director	Original Web series for Vampire Diaries (The CW)
2009	Dove Go Fresh Presents Gossip Girl: Real NYC Stories Revealed	Producer	Broadcast and Web-branded series for Unilever and The CW
2009	Nowhere Man	Producer, director	Original Web series for Heroes
2009	Smallville Season 8 DVD	Producer	
2010	Nurse Jeffrey	Producer	13 iOS appisodes for House (Fox)
2010	Vampire Diaries Season 1 DVD	Producer	
2010	Smallville Season 9 DVD	Producer	
2010	Michael Jackson: The Experience Live!	Producer	Live-streamed webcast for Xbox Kinect game Michael Jackson: The Experience
2012	Marvel Mash-Up	Producer	Series of interstitials re-editing Marvel animated series
2012	Nikita: Codebreaker	Producer	10-part interactive game series for Nikita (The CW)
2013	Insidious: Spectral Sightings	Producer, writer	Three-part digital prequel to Insidious to promote Insidious: Chapter 2
2014	The Flash: Chasing Lightning	Producer	Digital series on The CW website for The Flash
2014	Fandango FrontRunners	Producer	Digital series about Academy Award nominees for Fandango.com, hosted by Dave Karger
2014	Think Inside the Box	Producer	Digital promotion for The Boxtrolls and Amazon.com
2015	Heroes Reborn: Dark Matters	Producer	Six-chapter Web series for Heroes Reborn miniseries
2016	This Isn't Working	Executive producer	Five-part short-form digital series for ABC
2016	Agents of S.H.I.E.L.D.: Academy	Producer	Five-part digital series for ABC
2017	The Off Season	Executive producer	Five-part short-form digital series for ABC
