= Larry Cassidy =

English singer and bassist

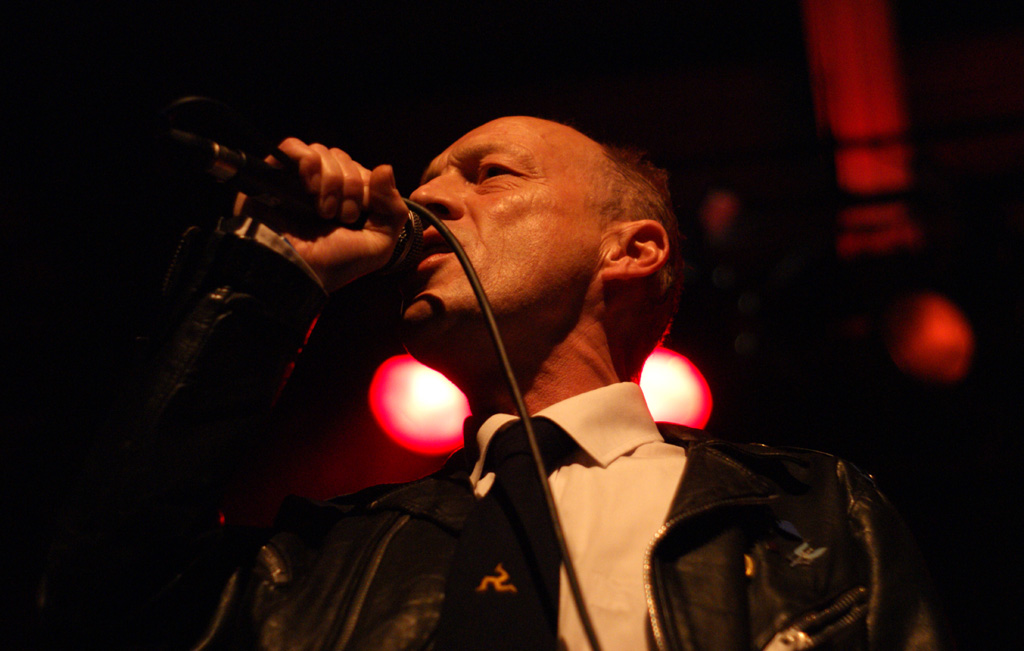
- Larry Cassidy in 2008

Background information
- Born: Lawrence John Cassidy; 18 April 1953; Blackpool, Lancashire, England
- Died: 27 February 2010 (aged 56)
- Instruments: Vocals; guitars; bass guitar

Lawrence John Cassidy (18 April 1953 – 27 February 2010) was an English musician, best known for being the singer and bassist of post-punk and electronic band Section 25.

Born in Blackpool, Lancashire, England, into the family which owned Casdon Toys, Cassidy decided against joining the company, and instead studied law and then sculpture in London. Having earned a first class degree in sculpture in 1977, and inspired by punk, psychedelia and krautrock, he returned to Blackpool and formed the band Section 25, along with his younger brother Vin on drums and Paul Wiggin on guitar. The band joined Factory Records in 1979 and Ian Curtis and Rob Gretton, Joy Division's singer and manager, respectively, produced their first single. Later producers included Martin Hannett, and Bernard Sumner of New Order.

He married Jenny Ross, who subsequently joined Section 25 in 1983, becoming his co-vocalist in the group. She died in 2004, just as the band were attempting a cautious reunion. Steered by Larry and Vin, Section 25 returned to live performance and recording in 2006, and three years later added Larry and Jenny's daughter, Bethany, whose voice recalls that of Jenny. However, Larry Cassidy died of a blood clot on 27 February 2010, at the age of 56.
