= Always Now =

Studio album by Section 25
- Released: September 1981
- Recorded: February 1981
- Studio: Britannia Row Studios, London, England
- Genre: Post-punk
- Label: Factory
- Producer: Martin Hannett; Ian Curtis

Section 25 chronology
Always Now (1981)	The Key of Dreams (1982)

Always Now is the debut studio album by Section 25. It was released in September 1981 through iconic Manchester record label Factory with the catalogue number FACT 45. The album was produced by Martin Hannett, best known for producing both of Joy Division's studio albums. Joy Division front man Ian Curtis has been credited as co-producing the record in parts before his death in May 1980. Recording took place in February 1981 at Britannia Row Studios in Islington, London, owned by Pink Floyd.

== Recording ==
"We recorded and mixed in ten days," recalled singer and bassist Larry Cassidy. "We went in with about six or seven finished numbers, while others were more improvised. C.P. was made up on the spot. I was playing a cheap bass in an expensive studio." The group were then a trio composed of Larry, younger sibling Vin Cassidy on drums, and guitarist Paul Wiggin. Musically the album combined austere post-punk rhythms with abstract and/or abrasive guitar textures, together with elements of Can, krautrock and psychedelia.

While recording the album, Section 25 supported New Order at London nightclub Heaven on 9 February 1981. Hannett mixed the live sound for both bands, using quadraphonic equipment rented from Britannia Row.

== Release and packaging ==
The album was packaged in a lavish sleeve devised by Factory design director Peter Saville (credited as Grafica Industria). "I did get a fascinating brief from Larry," Saville told author James Nice in Factory history Shadowplayers. "I seem to remember he wanted something quite European, but psychedelic – and with some Oriental influences. After that, I was on my own." The exterior sleeve featured black Berthold type on a yellow background, printed on heavy card die-cut to form a pochette envelope, and sealed with a small red I Ching sticker. The psychedelic element was concealed within, the lining and separate inner sleeve featuring a rich marbled pattern in dark blue, yellow and red supplied by specialist French paper company Keller-Dorian. Some copies of FACT 45 also included a home-made poster, printed cheaply by the group and featuring lyrics and photos.

A version of Dirty Disco with French lyrics was released as a single on Factory Benelux. The short, improvised instrumental C.P. was a musical collaboration (‘collective project’) between the band and Hannett. Two tracks recorded and finished at Britannia Row (Human Puppets and One True Path), were not included on the original vinyl album.

The album was reissued on CD in 1991 through LTM Recordings with several bonus tracks. An expanded double CD edition on Factory Benelux in 2015 re-mastered from the original analogue tapes, and added a bonus disc featuring their 1981 John Peel radio session as well as a complete live concert from 1980. The packaging replicated the original wraparound cover designed by Saville.

== Reception ==
Professional ratings
Review scores
Source	Rating
AllMusic	3/5 stars
BBC	mixed
Record Mirror	2/5 stars

The first edition of Always Now went on to sell 5,000 copies and entered the indie Top Ten, although the cost and complexity of the packaging made it problematic to license abroad and earned the band only 1000 pounds in royalties.

On release in September 1981 the album was reviewed in scathing terms by NME, who drew comparisons with Factory labelmates Joy Division. Dutch magazine Vinyl also expressed reservations, observing that early Section 25 "always had something paper-thin about it - a sound, or rather an absence of sound, giving the impression that the slightest breeze would blow it away." However, in 2006 Q described Always Now as "one of the best albums Britain's second city has unleashed", while avant garde magazine The Wire also praised "the wind-dried skeins of their blasted guitar harmonics and skimped electronics."

=== Legacy ===
In February 2016, album track "Hit" was sampled by Kanye West on a song, "FML", featured on his seventh studio album, The Life of Pablo. English dance rock band Friendly Fires took their name from the opening track.

== Track listing ==
All tracks are written by Section 25.

Side A
No.	Title	Length
1.	"Friendly Fires"	3:13
2.	"Dirty Disco"	5:20
3.	"C.P."	2:24
4.	"Loose Talk (Costs Lives)"	2:47
5.	"Inside Out"	2:57
6.	"Melt Close"	2:55
Total length:		19:36

Side B
No.	Title	Length
1.	"Hit"	2:59
2.	"Babies in the Bardo"	5:25
3.	"Be Brave"	4:39
4.	"New Horizon"	6:02
Total length:		19:05

=== LTM reissue extra tracks ===
LTMCD-2308, 1991

- "Haunted" (3:17)
- "Charnel Ground" (3:55)
- "Knew Noise" (4:30)
- "Up to You" (4:00)
- "Girls Don't Count" (4:16)
- "Oyo Achel Ada" (4:21)
- "After Image" (2:50)
- "Red Voice" (1:49)

=== Factory Benelux 2015 reissue ===
Disc one

same tracks as LTM reissue

Disc two

1. "One True Path" (Peel Session)
2. "Babies in the Bardo" (Peel Session)
3. "Hit" (Peel Session)
4. "Je Veux Ton Amour" (7")
5. "Loose Talk (Costs Lives)" (live)
6. "Human Puppets" (live)
7. "Knew Noise" (live)
8. "Friendly Fires" (live)
9. "Girls Don't Count" (live)
10. "New Horizon" (live)
11. "Haunted" (live)
12. "You're On Your Own" (live)
13. "Floating" (demo)
14. "Friendly Fires" (outtake)
15. "One True Path" (outtake)

== Personnel ==
- Martin Hannett – production
- John Caffery – engineering
