= Frank Marino =

Canadian guitarist

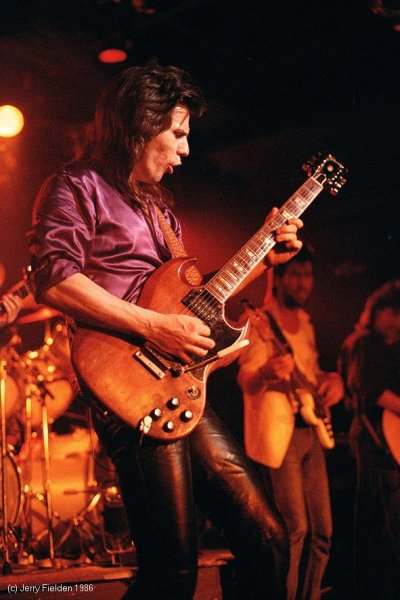

Background information
- Born: Francesco Antonio Marino; November 20, 1954 (age 71); Montreal, Quebec, Canada
- Genres: Hard rock; psychedelic rock; blues rock; heavy metal
- Occupations: Musician, songwriter
- Instruments: Guitar, vocals
- Years active: 1970–2021
- Website: mahoganyrush.com

Francesco Antonio Marino (born November 20, 1954) is a Canadian guitarist and singer, best known as the leader of Canadian hard rock band Mahogany Rush. Often compared to Jimi Hendrix, he is described as one of the most underrated guitarists of the 1970s and 1980s.

== Biography and career ==
After playing drums since he was five, Marino started playing guitar around age 13 or 14. An often-repeated myth is that he was visited by an apparition of Jimi Hendrix after a bad LSD trip – a myth Marino has always disavowed, and continues to do so on his personal website. His playing, however, is inspired by Hendrix (on the Gibson website he is described as "carrying Jimi's psychedelic torch"), and Marino is notable for often performing cover versions of Hendrix classics such as "Purple Haze" and "All Along The Watchtower". He has been criticized by some as a Hendrix clone. Marino himself claims that he did not consciously set out to imitate Hendrix: "The whole style just came naturally. I didn't choose it; it chose me."

Mahogany Rush were moderately popular in the 1970s. Their records charted in Billboard, and they toured extensively, performing with well-known bands, including Aerosmith and Ted Nugent, and played at California Jam II in 1978. Toward the end of the 1970s, the band began to be billed as "Frank Marino and Mahogany Rush." Not much later, Mahogany Rush split up and in the early 1980s Marino released two solo albums on CBS. The band reformed and continued to perform throughout the 1980s and 1990s. In 1990, Marino opened his own audio recording studio, Starbase Studio, in the Notre-Dame-de-Grace district of Montreal, Quebec, Canada.

Marino reformed a band in 2000, "I always knew we had fans, I just didn't know I'd find half a million of them on the Web," he said in an interview with Guitar Player in 2005. He released Eye of the Storm, and went on tour again, playing more improvisational shows. After having not played live for a decade, Frank scheduled a tour for 2020 that was postponed due to the pandemic. He rescheduled the tour for 2021, before announcing his retirement on June 30, 2021, due to an undisclosed medical condition. He was also involved in blues recordings with other artists, playing on tribute albums to Albert King and Stevie Ray Vaughan.

In 2021, he announced his retirement from music. In October 2025, he stated in an interview that his nerve damage had recovered sufficiently to allow performing again, though when and how was left up in the air. On August 7, 2026 he played his first concert in 16 years, a free outdoor show in Montreal as part of ItalfestMTL.

== Technique and equipment ==
Besides Jimi Hendrix, Marino acknowledged the influence of John Cipollina (of Quicksilver Messenger Service fame), Robby Krieger, Duane Allman, Johnny Winter, and Carlos Santana. His playing style is a combination of blues, heavy rock and, to an extent, jazz fusion techniques. One of his notable tricks is playing (live) a lick as if it were played backwards, with the help of only a volume pedal and a delay. His style has influenced many guitar players, including Zakk Wylde, Joe Bonamassa, Eric Gales, Vinnie Moore, and Paul Gilbert. His tone is recognized by, for instance, Guitar Player, which called him a "full-spectrum guitar god," alongside Jeff Beck, Eddie Van Halen, and The Edge.

Marino is a devoted Gibson SG player and uses them with the original PAF pickups, as well as two with DiMarzio humbuckers. He also has an SG with single-coil DiMarzio pickups. He is noted for complicated setups; according to Guitar Player, he has "an entire pedalboard ... assigned to hold the expression pedals that control the parameters of the effects on another pedalboard." In the past, he has built his own amplifiers to achieve the right sound; he also uses Fender Twins. He currently uses a preamp which he built himself, reminiscent of a Fender, and any available power amp, through a 2" x 15" Fane cabinet.

== Personal life ==
Of Italian and Syrian background, Marino is a practicing member of the Syriac Orthodox Church.

Marino is uncle to Danny Marino, lead guitarist of Canadian metal band the Agonist.

== Discography ==
=== Solo ===
- 1981: The Power of Rock 'n' Roll (Note: Originally released as Frank Marino solo albums and later re-released under the moniker Frank Marino & Mahogany Rush.)
- 1982: Juggernaut
- 1986: Full Circle
- 1990: From the Hip
- 1999: Guitar Heroes Vol 4 – Frank Marino Stories of a Hero

=== Other recordings and collections ===
- April Wine - The Whole World's Goin' Crazy (1976)
- Nanette Workman (album recorded but never released) (1976)
- California Jam II (6 CD set) (1978)
- Billy Workman:same (1979)
- V X N (pronounced Vixen ) (1985)
- Metal Giants (various artists) (1988)
- Guitar Speak II (1990)
- Hats off to Stevie Ray (various artists) (1993)
- Fit for A. King (various artists) (1993)
- Bryan Lee: Live at the Old Absinthe House Bar Friday Night (1997)
- Bryan Lee: Live at the Old Absinthe House Bar Saturday Night (1998)
- Best of the Guitar Slingers (various artists) (2002)
- Live and Loud (various artists) (2002)
- Rock Thunder (various artists) (2002)
- Bryan Lee: Bryan Lee's Greatest Hits (2003)
- Rockin' 70s (various artists) (2004)
- Montreal Jubilation Gospel Choir & the Jubilation Big Band – I'll Take You There (track 9) (2005)
- Revolution – A Rock and Roll Tribute to The Beatles (various artists) (2005)
- Doc Rock presents Classic Rock Weekend (various artists) (2006)
- Vargas Blues Band – Flamenco Blues Experience (track 2) (2008)
- Nos stars chantent le blues à Montréal – track 5. Who do you love? – Jonas (avec Frank Marino) (2010)
- Just Gettin' Started – track 4. Wild Horses – Nanette Workman (2012)

=== Tribute ===
- Secondhand Smoke: A Tribute to Frank Marino (tracks by George Lynch, Ronnie Montrose, James Byrd, Randy Hansen, Audley Freed, Jennifer Batten, Karl Cochran, Jeff Cloud, Rick Ray and John Norum) (2005)
