= Matt Greenhalgh =

English screenwriter

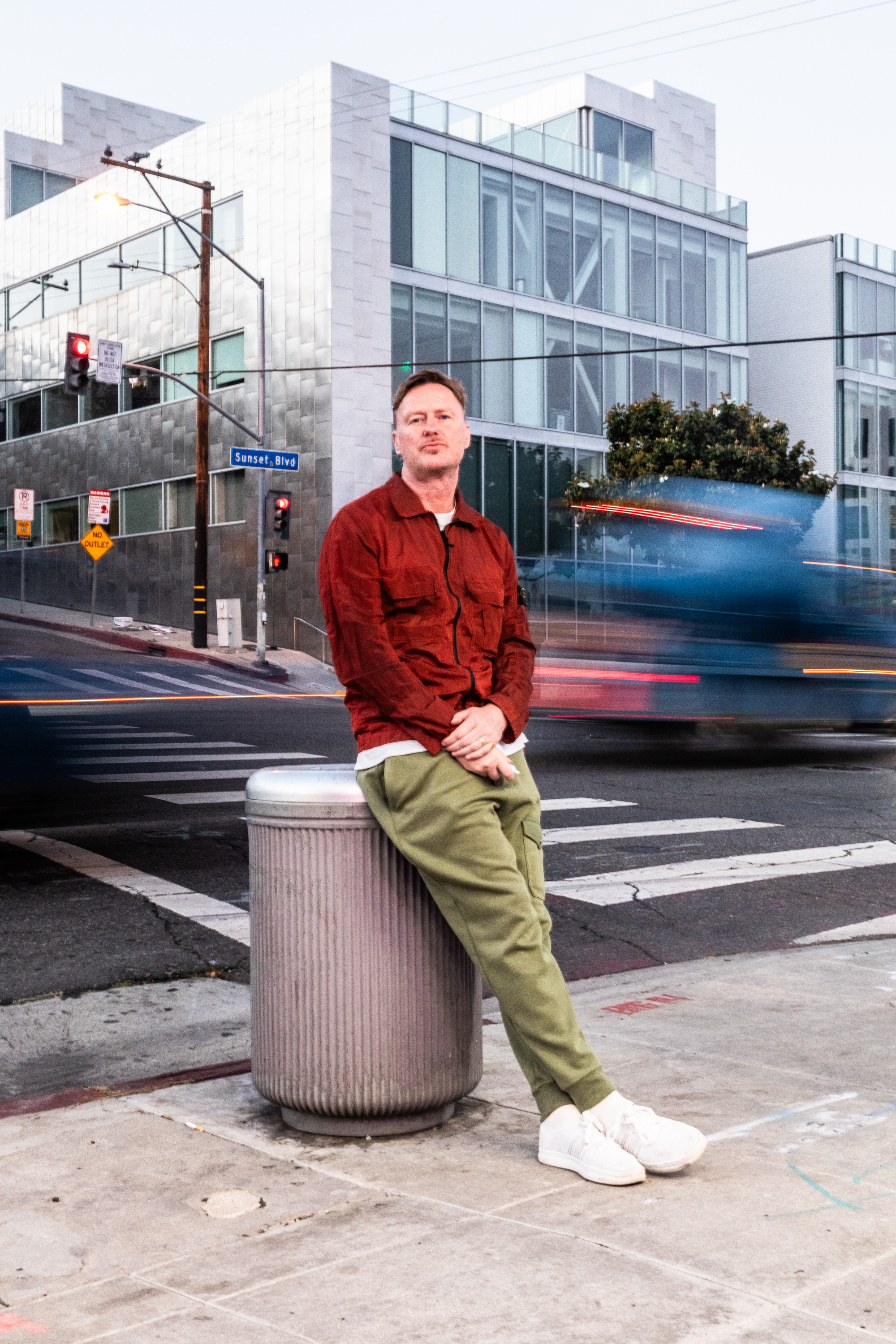
- Born: Salford, Greater Manchester, England
- Occupation: Screenwriter
- Years active: 1999–present
- Spouse: Nicola Shindler
- Children: 3
- Website: mattgreenhalgh.co.uk

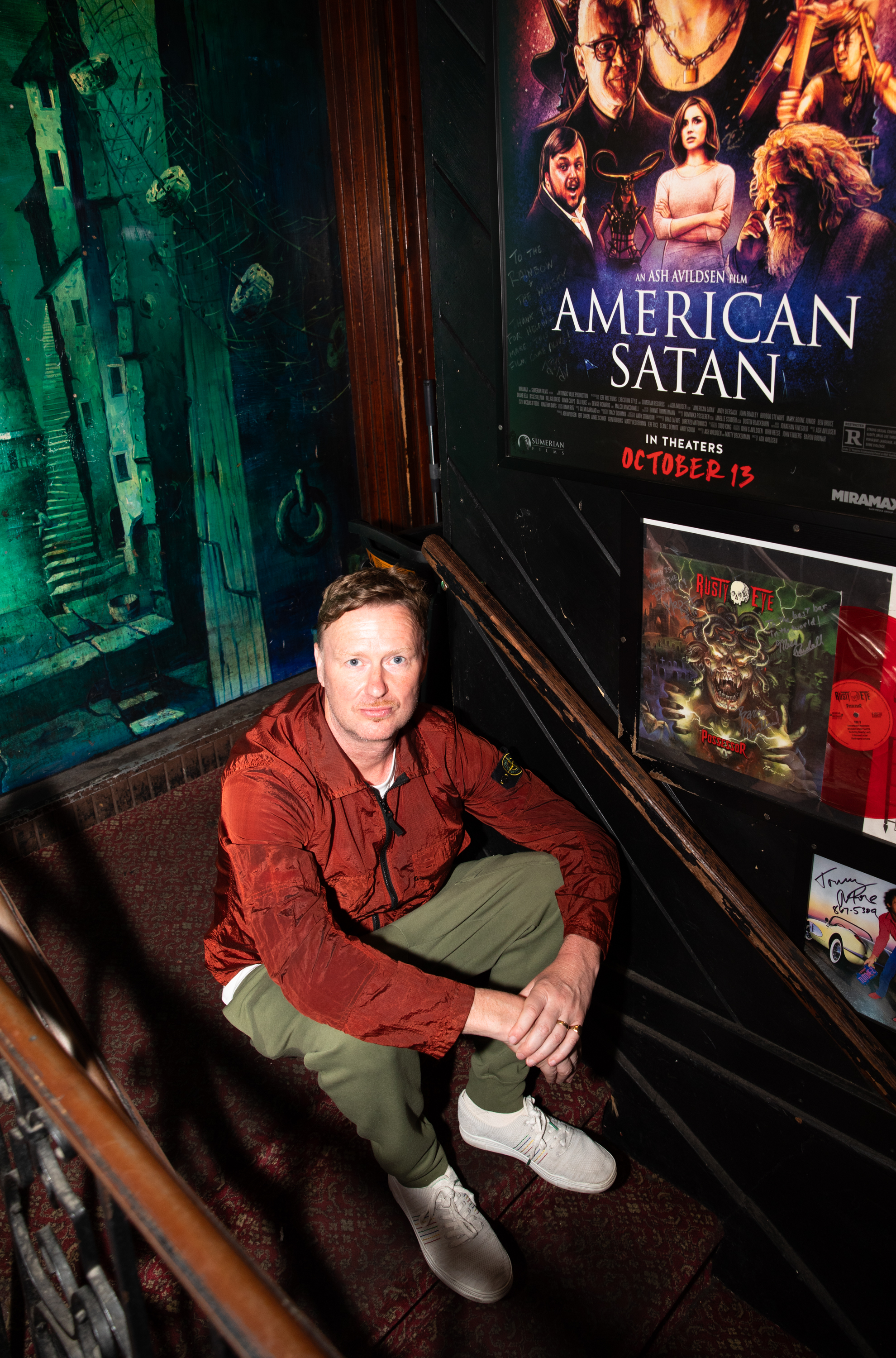

Matthew Greenhalgh is an English screenwriter from Manchester. He is best known for writing the screenplays of several biopic films, including Control (2007), Nowhere Boy (2009), Film Stars Don't Die in Liverpool (2017), and Back to Black (2024). He has received five BAFTA nominations, winning once for Most Promising Newcomer for Control—which also earned him an Evening Standard British Film Award for Best Screenplay.

== Early life and education ==
Greenhalgh was born in Salford in the Greater Manchester area of England, to Philip Greenhalgh and Rita Greenhalgh (née Roberts). He grew up in Prestwich in North Manchester.

Greenhalgh graduated from St Bede's College, Manchester and Loreto College, Manchester. He attended Warrington Collegiate Institute with a focus in media studies. He graduated from the University of Chester where he studied print media.

== Career ==
Greenhalgh started out writing nightclub reviews for the Manchester magazine, City Life.

Greenhalgh got his start working in television on the Channel 4 TV series Hollyoaks and Brookside as a runner. From 1999 to 2000, he worked as an assistant director on the British TV show, Queer as Folk. He was first assistant director on the 2000 TV show, Fat Friends, and on 2001's Clocking Off.

In 2002, Greenhalgh wrote for the BBC TV series, Clocking Off. In 2003, he wrote one of the 90 minute episodes of the last series of the ITV series, Cold Feet. He worked as a writer and director on series 1 and 2 of the BBC3 series, the Mancunian Burn It, and then as a writer and director on the Channel 4 series, Legless.

Greenhalgh's film writing debut was a biopic of Joy Division frontman Ian Curtis, the 2007 film Control, which was directed by Anton Corbijn. He was awarded the Carl Foreman BAFTA award at the 61st British Academy Film Awards, and was nominated for Best Screenplay at the British Independent Film Award for his work on the film. Control was adapted from the book, Touching From a Distance, written by Ian Curtis' wife, Deborah Curtis.

Greenhalgh wrote the 2009 film Nowhere Boy, about a young John Lennon, which was directed by Sam Taylor Wood and starred Aaron Johnson. The film was nominated for a BAFTA and a BIFA for Best Screenplay.

In 2010, Greenhalgh wrote and directed the short film, Acid Burn, which starred Agyness Deyn and Matthew Beard. In 2011, he directed the script for the short film, Supermarket Girl, which starred Matthew Beard and Nichola Burley.

He wrote the screenplay for the 2013's The Look of Love, a film about the famous British pornographer Paul Raymond, directed by Michael Winterbottom and starring Steve Coogan and Anna Friel which premiered in Sundance Film Festival 2013 and Berlin Film Festival 2013.

Greenhalgh wrote the 2017 Paul McGuigan film, Film Stars Don't Die in Liverpool, starring Annette Bening, Jamie Bell and Julie Walters. He was nominated for BAFTA Award for Best Adapted Screenplay.

In July 2022, it was announced that the feature film Back to Black, based on the life and career of late singer Amy Winehouse had been scripted by Greenhalgh, with Sam Taylor-Johnson directing the movie. It was released in 2024, starring Marisa Abela, Jack O'Connell, and Eddie Marsan.

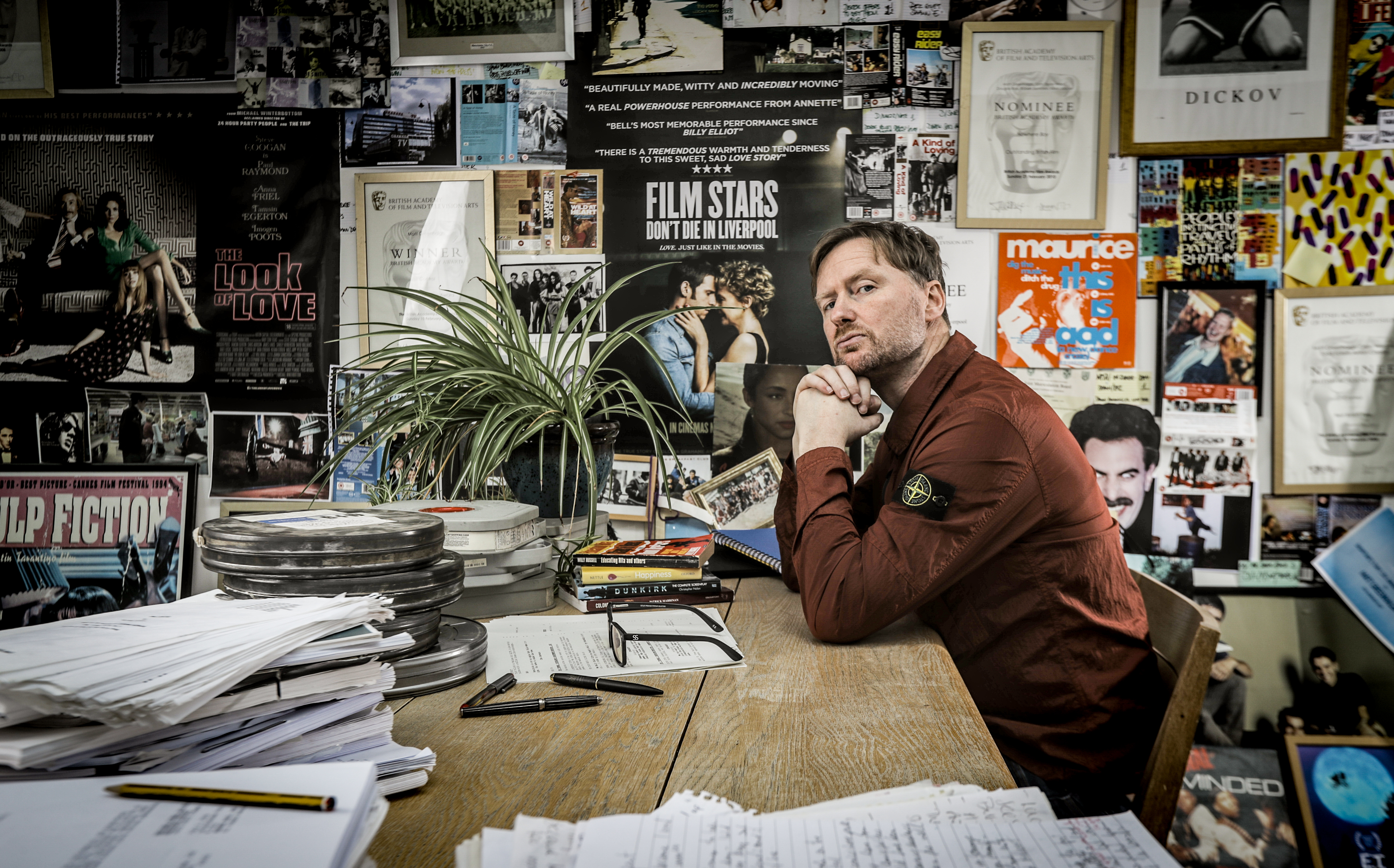

== Personal life ==
Greenhalgh is married to British television producer Nicola Shindler, with whom he has two daughters and a son.

== Awards ==
- 2003: BAFTA TV Award, Best New Writer (nomination) for Clocking Off
- 2007: British Independent Film Award, Best Screenplay (nomination) for Control
- 2007: Chicago International Film Festival, Silver Hugo Award, Best Screenplay for Control
- 2008: BAFTA Awards, Carl Foreman Award for the Most Promising Newcomer for Control
- 2008: BAFTA Awards, Alexander Korda Award for Best British Film (nomination) for Control – with Orian Williams, Todd Eckert, Anton Corbijn
- 2008: Evening Standard British Film Awards, Best Screenplay for Control
- 2008: London Critics Circle Film Awards, ALFS Award, British Breakthrough – Filmmaking for Control
- 2009: British Independent Film Award, Best Screenplay (nomination) for Nowhere Boy
- 2010: BAFTA Awards, Alexander Korda Award for Best British Film (nomination) for Nowhere Boy with Kevin Loader, Douglas Rae, Robert Bernstein, Sam Taylor-Johnson
- 2018: BAFTA Film Award, Best Screenplay (Adapted) (nomination) for Film Stars Don't Die in Liverpool

== Filmography ==
- 1999-2000: Queer as Folk (TV Series) – Third Assistant Director (8 episodes); First Assistant Director (2 episodes)
- 2000: Fat Friends (TV Series) – First Assistant Director (3 episodes)
- 2001: Clocking Off (TV Series) – First Assistant Director (1 episode); Written by (1 episode)
- 2003: Cold Feet (TV Series) – Written by (1 episode)
- 2003: Burn It (TV Series) – Written by (15 episodes)
- 2005: Legless (TV Movie) – Writer, Director
- 2007: Control – Screenplay
- 2009: Nowhere Boy – Screenplay
- 2010: Acid Burn (Short) – Writer, Director
- 2011: Supermarket Girl (Short) – Director
- 2012: Move On – Writer
- 2013: The Look of Love – Written by
- 2017: Film Stars Don't Die in Liverpool – Screenplay
- 2022: Floodlights — Screenplay
- 2024: Back to Black — Screenplay

== Selected works and publications ==
- Greenhalgh, Matt (5 October 2007). "Putting the pieces of Ian Curtis back together". The Guardian.
- Greenhalgh, Matt. Nowhere Boy (Shooting script). New York: The Weinstein Company. OCLC 801279263.
