= 61st British Academy Film Awards =

2008 film award ceremony

- Date: 10 February 2008
- Site: Royal Opera House, Covent Garden, London
- Hosted by: Jonathan Ross

Highlights
- Best Film: Atonement
- Best British Film: This Is England
- Best Actor: Daniel Day-Lewis; There Will Be Blood
- Best Actress: Marion Cotillard; La Vie en Rose (La Môme)
- Most awards: La Vie en Rose (La Môme) (4)
- Most nominations: Atonement (14)

The 61st British Academy Film Awards, more commonly known as the BAFTAs, took place on 10 February 2008 at the Royal Albert Hall in London, honouring the best national and foreign films of 2007. Presented by the British Academy of Film and Television Arts, accolades were handed out for the best feature-length film and documentaries of any nationality that were screened at British cinemas in 2007.

The nominees were announced on 16 January 2008 by Naomie Harris and Kelly Reilly. Atonement won Best Film, while Coen brothers, Joel and Ethan, won Best Director for No Country for Old Men, which also went on to win Best Cinematography and Best Supporting Actor for Javier Bardem. Daniel Day-Lewis won Best Actor for There Will Be Blood, Marion Cotillard won Best Actress for La Vie en Rose (La Môme), and Tilda Swinton won Best Supporting Actress for Michael Clayton. This Is England, directed by Shane Meadows, was voted Outstanding British Film of 2007.

Jonathan Ross hosted the ceremony for the second consecutive year.

== Winners and nominees ==
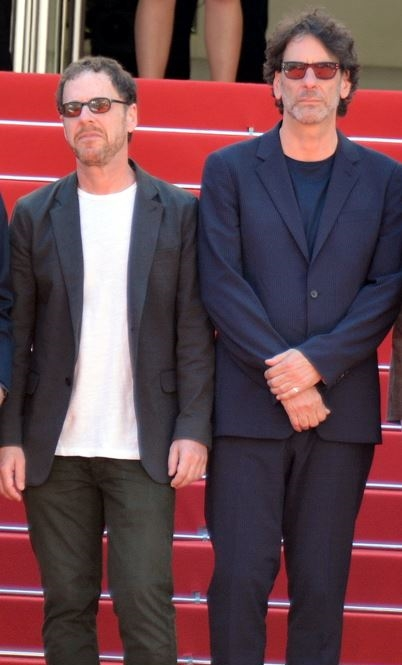
Coen brothers, Best Director winners

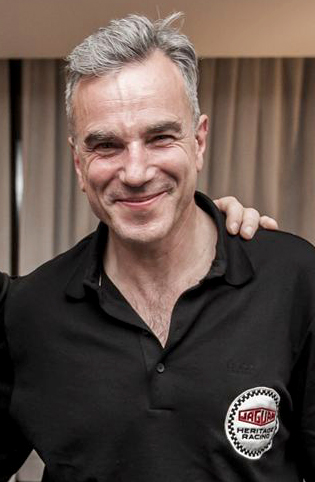
Daniel Day-Lewis, Best Actor winner

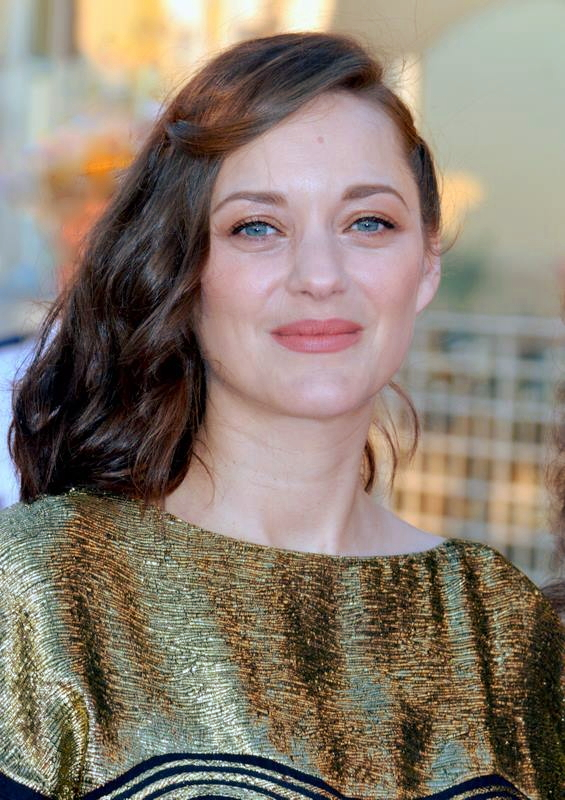
Marion Cotillard, Best Actress winner

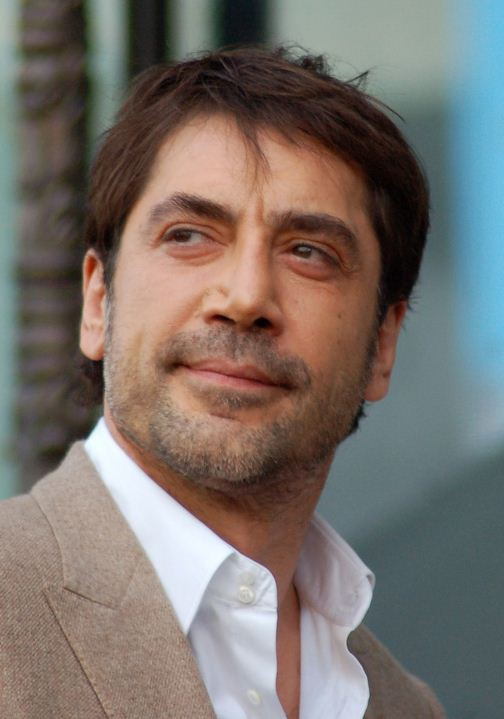
Javier Bardem, Best Supporting Actor winner

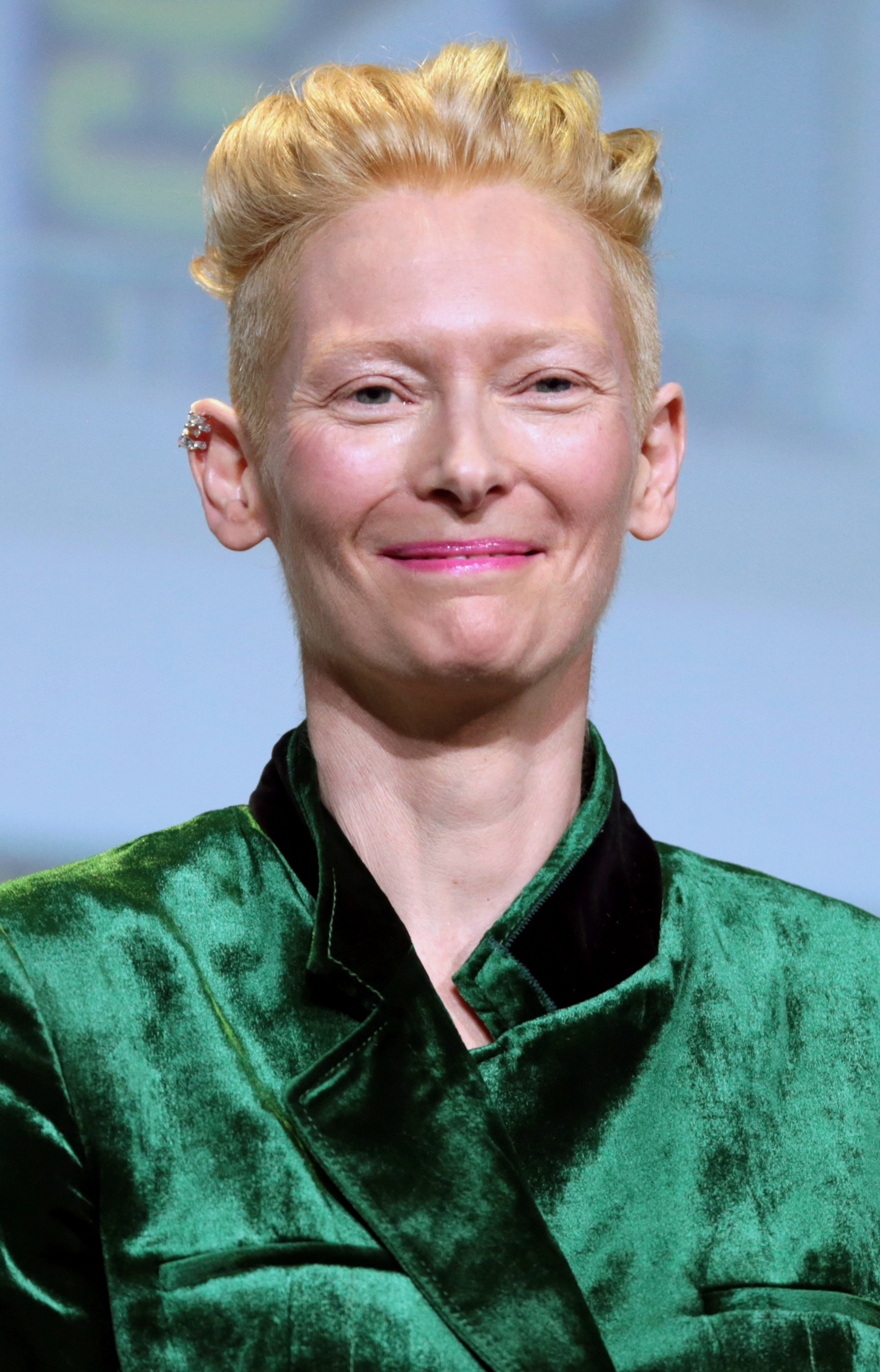
Tilda Swinton, Best Supporting Actress winner

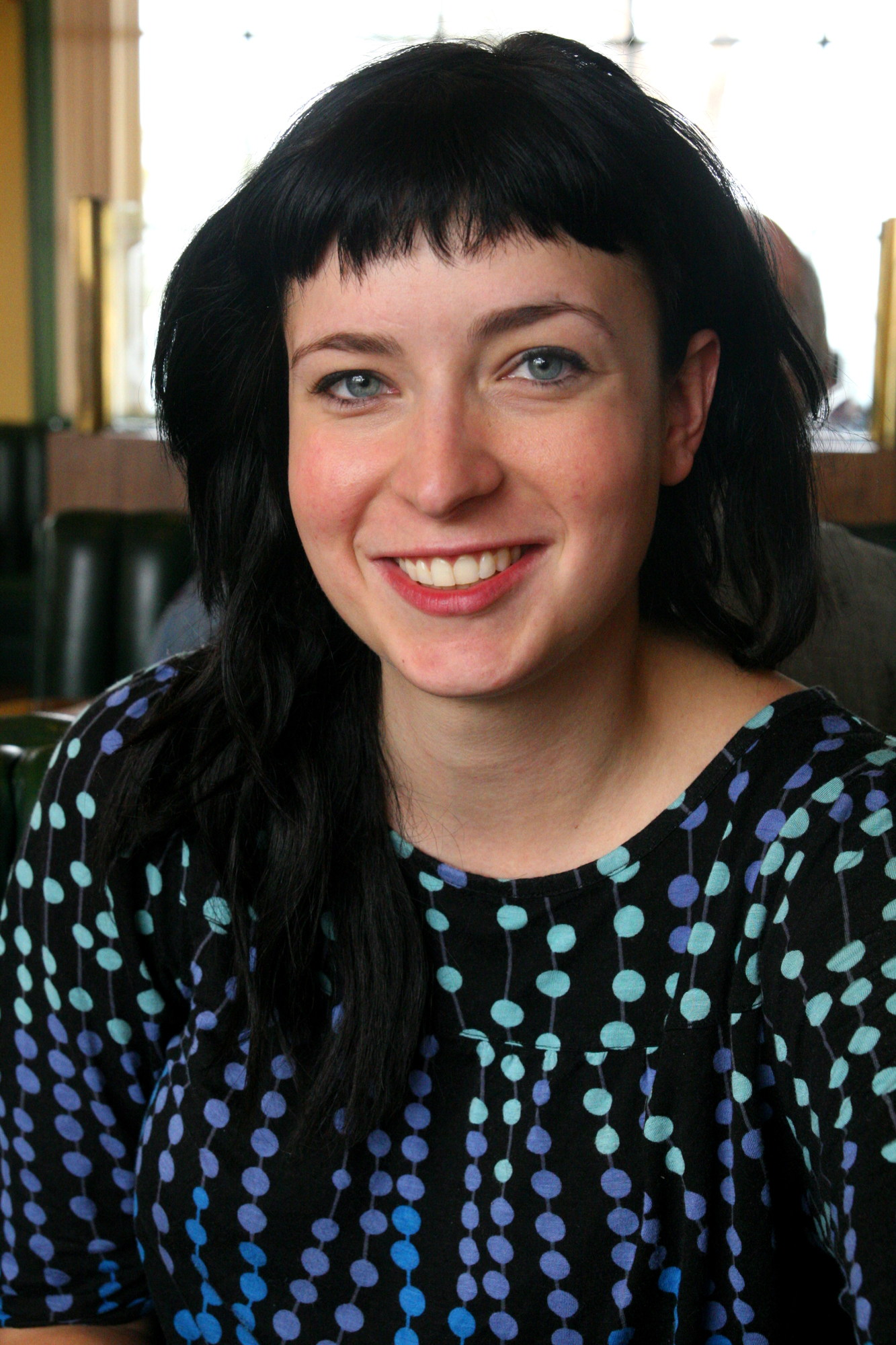
Diablo Cody, Best Original Screenplay winner

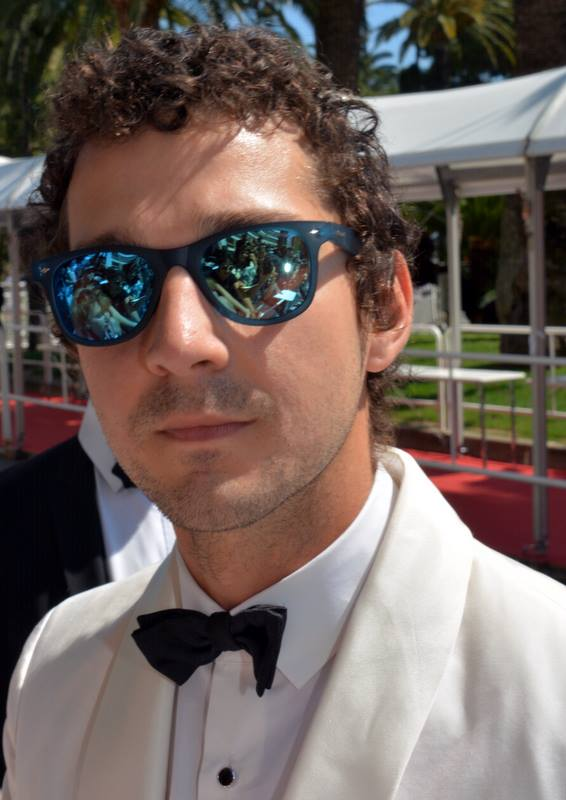
Shia LaBeouf, Orange Rising Star Award winner

=== BAFTA Fellowship ===
- **Anthony Hopkins**

=== Outstanding British Contribution to Cinema ===
- **Barry Wilkinson**

=== Awards ===
Winners are listed first and highlighted in boldface.

**Best Film**: **Atonement – Tim Bevan, Eric Fellner and Paul Webster**; American Gangster – Brian Grazer and Ridley Scott; The Lives of Others – Quirin Begg and Max Wiedemann; No Country for Old Men – Scott Rudin, Joel Coen and Ethan Coen; There Will Be Blood – JoAnne Sellar, Paul Thomas Anderson and Daniel Lupi	**Best Direction**: **Joel Coen and Ethan Coen – No Country for Old Men**; Paul Thomas Anderson – There Will Be Blood; Paul Greengrass – The Bourne Ultimatum; Florian Henckel von Donnersmarck – The Lives of Others; Joe Wright – Atonement
**Best Actor in a Leading Role**: **Daniel Day-Lewis – There Will Be Blood as Daniel Plainview**; George Clooney – Michael Clayton as Michael Raymond Clayton; James McAvoy – Atonement as Robbie Turner; Viggo Mortensen – Eastern Promises as Nikolai Luzhin; Ulrich Mühe – The Lives of Others as Hauptmann Gerd Wiesler	**Best Actress in a Leading Role**: **Marion Cotillard – La Vie en Rose as Édith Piaf**; Cate Blanchett – Elizabeth: The Golden Age as Elizabeth I; Julie Christie – Away from Her as Fiona; Keira Knightley – Atonement as Cecilia Tallis; Elliot Page – Juno as Juno MacGuff
**Best Actor in a Supporting Role**: **Javier Bardem – No Country for Old Men as Anton Chigurh**; Paul Dano – There Will Be Blood as Paul Sunday / Eli Sunday; Philip Seymour Hoffman – Charlie Wilson's War as Gust Avrakotos; Tommy Lee Jones – No Country for Old Men as Ed Tom Bell; Tom Wilkinson – Michael Clayton as Arthur Edens	**Best Actress in a Supporting Role**: **Tilda Swinton – Michael Clayton as Karen Crowder**; Cate Blanchett – I'm Not There as Jude Quinn; Kelly Macdonald – No Country for Old Men as Carla Jean Moss; Samantha Morton – Control as Deborah Curtis; Saoirse Ronan – Atonement as Briony Tallis
**Best Original Screenplay**: **Juno – Diablo Cody**; American Gangster – Steven Zaillian; The Lives of Others – Florian Henckel von Donnersmarck; Michael Clayton – Tony Gilroy; This Is England – Shane Meadows	**Best Adapted Screenplay**: **The Diving Bell and the Butterfly – Ronald Harwood**; Atonement – Christopher Hampton; The Kite Runner – David Benioff; No Country for Old Men – Joel Coen and Ethan Coen; There Will Be Blood – Paul Thomas Anderson
**Best Cinematography**: **No Country for Old Men – Roger Deakins**; American Gangster – Harris Savides; Atonement – Seamus McGarvey; The Bourne Ultimatum – Oliver Wood; There Will Be Blood – Robert Elswit	**Best Costume Design**: **La Vie en Rose – Marit Allen**; Atonement – Jacqueline Durran; Elizabeth: The Golden Age – Alexandra Byrne; Lust, Caution – Pan Lai; Sweeney Todd: The Demon Barber of Fleet Street – Colleen Atwood
**Best Editing**: **The Bourne Ultimatum – Christopher Rouse**; American Gangster – Pietro Scalia; Atonement – Paul Tothill; Michael Clayton – John Gilroy; No Country for Old Men – Joel Coen and Ethan Coen	**Best Makeup and Hair**: **La Vie en Rose – Jan Archibald and Didier Lavergne**; Atonement – Ivana Primorac; Elizabeth: The Golden Age – Jenny Shircore; Hairspray – Judi Cooper-Sealy and Jordan Samuel; Sweeney Todd: The Demon Barber of Fleet Street – Ivana Primorac and Peter Owen
**Best Original Music**: **La Vie en Rose – Christopher Gunning**; American Gangster – Marc Streitenfeld; Atonement – Dario Marianelli; The Kite Runner – Alberto Iglesias; There Will Be Blood – Jonny Greenwood	**Best Production Design**: **Atonement – Sarah Greenwood and Katie Spencer**; Elizabeth: The Golden Age – Guy Hendrix Dyas and Richard Roberts; Harry Potter and the Order of the Phoenix – Stuart Craig and Stephenie McMillan; La Vie en Rose – Olivier Raoux and Stanislas Reydellet; There Will Be Blood – Jack Fisk and Jim Erickson
**Best Sound**: **The Bourne Ultimatum – Kirk Francis, Scott Millan, David Parker, Karen Baker Landers and Per Hallberg**; Atonement – Danny Hambrook, Paul Hamblin, Catherine Hodgson and Becki Ponting; La Vie en Rose – Laurent Zeilig, Pascal Villard, Jean-Paul Hurier and Marc Doisne; No Country for Old Men – Peter Kurland, Skip Lievsay, Craig Berkey and Greg Orloff; There Will Be Blood – Christopher Scarabosio, Matthew Wood, John Pritchett, Michael Semanick and Tom Johnson	**Best Special Visual Effects**: **The Golden Compass – Michael Fink, Bill Westenhofer, Ben Morris and Trevor Wood**; The Bourne Ultimatum – Peter Chiang, Charlie Noble, Mattias Lindahl and Joss Williams; Harry Potter and the Order of the Phoenix – Tim Burke, John Richardson, Emma Norton and Chris Shaw; Pirates of the Caribbean: At World's End – John Knoll, Charles Gibson, Hal Hickel and John Frazier; Spider-Man 3 – Scott Stokdyk, Peter Nofz, John Frazier and Spencer Cook
**Outstanding British Film**: **This Is England – Mark Herbert and Shane Meadows**; Atonement – Tim Bevan, Eric Fellner, Paul Webster, Joe Wright and Christopher Hampton; The Bourne Ultimatum – Frank Marshall, Patrick Crowley, Paul L. Sandberg, Paul Greengrass, Tony Gilroy, Scott Z. Burns and George Nolfi; Control – Orian Williams, Todd Eckert, Anton Corbijn and Matt Greenhalgh; Eastern Promises – Paul Webster, Robert Lantos, David Cronenberg and Steven Knight	**Outstanding Debut by a British Writer, Director or Producer**: **Control – Matt Greenhalgh (Writer)**; Brick Lane – Sarah Gavron (Director); The Killing of John Lennon – Andrew Piddington (Writer/Director); Scott Walker: 30 Century Man – Mia Bays (Producer); Taking Liberties – Chris Atkins (Writer/Director)
**Best Short Animation**: **The Pearce Sisters – Jo Allen and Luis Cook**; The Crumblegiant – Pearse Moore and John McCloskey; Head Over Heels – Osbert Parker, Fiona Pitkin and Ian Gouldstone	**Best Short Film**: **Dog Altogether – Diarmid Scrimshaw and Paddy Considine**; Hesitation – Julien Berlan, Michelle Eastwood and Virginia Gilbert; The One and Only Herb McGwyer Plays Wallis Island – Charlie Henderson, James Griffiths, Tim Key and Tom Basden; Soft – Jane Hooks and Simon Ellis; The Stronger – Dan McCulloch, Lia Williams and Frank McGuinness
**Best Animated Film**: **Ratatouille – Brad Bird**; Shrek the Third – Chris Miller; The Simpsons Movie – David Silverman	**Best Film Not in the English Language**: **The Lives of Others – Quirin Begg, Max Wiedemann and Florian Henckel von Donnersmarck**; The Diving Bell and the Butterfly – Kathleen Kennedy, Jon Kilik and Julian Schnabel; The Kite Runner – William Horberg, Walter F. Parkes, Rebecca Yeldham and Marc Forster; La Vie en Rose – Alain Goldman and Olivier Dahan; Lust, Caution – William Kong, James Schamus and Ang Lee
**Rising Star Award**: **Shia LaBeouf**; Sienna Miller; Elliot Page; Sam Riley; Tang Wei

== Statistics ==
Films that received multiple nominations
Nominations	Film
14	Atonement
9	No Country for Old Men
9	There Will Be Blood
7	La Vie en Rose
6	The Bourne Ultimatum
5	American Gangster
5	The Lives of Others
5	Michael Clayton
4	Elizabeth: The Golden Age
3	Control
3	The Kite Runner
2	The Diving Bell and the Butterfly
2	Eastern Promises
2	Harry Potter and the Order of the Phoenix
2	Juno
2	Lust, Caution
2	Sweeney Todd: The Demon Barber of Fleet Street
2	This Is England

Films that received multiple awards
Awards	Film
4	La Vie en Rose
3	No Country for Old Men
2	Atonement
2	The Bourne Ultimatum

== In Memoriam ==
- Lois Maxwell
- Alex Phillips
- Betty Hutton
- Freddie Francis
- Calvin Lockhart
- Brad Renfro
- Charles Lane
- Laszlo Kovacs
- Fernando Fernan-Gomez
- Jean-Pierre Cassel
- Gordon Scott
- Mali Finn
- Michel Serrault
- Michelangelo Antonioni
- Victoria Hopper
- Christopher Greenbury
- Russell Lloyd
- Jane Wyman
- Brian Eatwell
- Frank Capra Jr.
- Alex Thomson
- Peter Handford
- Marcel Marceau
- Marit Allen
- Deborah Kerr
- Richard Franklin
- Ulrich Mühe
- Golda Offenheim
- Ingmar Bergman
- Peter Zinner
- Peter Ellenshaw
- Heath Ledger

== See also ==
- 80th Academy Awards
- 33rd César Awards
- 13th Critics' Choice Awards
- 60th Directors Guild of America Awards
- 21st European Film Awards
- 65th Golden Globe Awards
- 28th Golden Raspberry Awards
- 22nd Goya Awards
- 23rd Independent Spirit Awards
- 13th Lumière Awards
- 19th Producers Guild of America Awards
- 12th Satellite Awards
- 34th Saturn Awards
- 14th Screen Actors Guild Awards
- 60th Writers Guild of America Awards
