= List of accolades received by Atonement (film) =

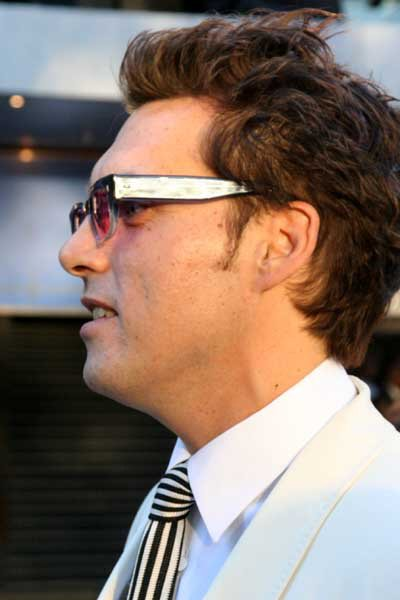
- Director Joe Wright at the UK premiere of Atonement
Awards and nominations
Award	Won	Nominated
Academy Award	1	7
Alliance of Women Film Journalists	2	6
American Society of Cinematographers	0	1
Art Directors Guild	0	1
British Academy Film Awards	2	14
British Society of Cinematographers	0	1
British Society of Cinematographers	0	1
Broadcast Film Critics Association	0	5
Chicago Film Critics Association	0	3
Cinema Brazil Grand Prize	0	1
Costume Designers Guild	0	1
Dallas-Fort Worth Film Critics Association	0	2
Empire Awards	3	6
European Film Awards	0	3
Evening Standard British Film Awards	1	5
Film Critics Circle of Australia	0	1
Golden Globe Award	2	7
Golden Tomato Awards	1	1
Golden Trailer Awards	1	2
Houston Film Critics Society	1	4
International Film Music Critics Association	3	4
Irish Film & Television Awards	2	5
Ivor Novello Awards	1	1
London Film Critics' Circle	2	8
Motion Picture Sound Editors	0	1
Nastro d'Argento	0	1
National Board of Review	0	1
Online Film Critics Society	0	5
Pyongyang International Film Festival	1	1
Rembrandt Award	1	1
Richard Attenborough Film Awards	4	4
San Diego Film Critics Society	1	1
Satellite Awards	1	5
St. Louis Gateway Film Critics Association	0	5
Teen Choice Awards	1	1
USC Scripter Award	0	1
Vancouver Film Critics Circle	1	4
Venice International Film Festival	1	2
Women Film Critics Circle	1	1
World Soundtrack Academy	1	2
Young Artist Award	0	1
- Total number of wins and nominations
Totals	35	122
- References

Atonement is a 2007 British romantic World War II film directed by Joe Wright. Christopher Hampton adapted the screenplay from the eponymous novel by Ian McEwan. The film focuses on fictional lovers Cecilia (Keira Knightley) and Robbie (James McAvoy), whose lives are ruined when Cecilia's younger sister, Briony (Saoirse Ronan), falsely accuses Robbie of a serious crime. The film opened the 64th Venice International Film Festival on 29 August 2007 and competed for the Golden Lion. The following month it screened at the Vancouver International Film Festival and the Toronto International Film Festival. Atonement was released in the United Kingdom by Universal Studios on 7 September 2007. It was then released in the United States by Focus Features on 7 December 2007. The film earned over £84 million in its combined total gross at the box office.

Atonement earned many awards and nominations in categories ranging from recognition of the film itself to Hampton's screenplay and the cast's acting performances, particularly those of Keira Knightley, James McAvoy and Saoirse Ronan. The film received seven Academy Award nominations and came away with one award for Best Original Score. The Alliance of Women Film Journalists awarded Atonement two accolades from six nominations, while the American Society of Cinematographers and the Art Directors Guild gave the film one nomination apiece. Atonement gathered fourteen nominations at the 61st British Academy Film Awards, the most of any film that year, but ultimately came away with two awards. Cinematographer Seamus McGarvey received a nomination for his work from the British Society of Cinematographers and costume designer, Jacqueline Durran, earned a nomination from the Costume Designers Guild. Atonement won three accolades out of five nominations at the 13th Empire Awards.

The film also received five nominations from the Evening Standard British Film Awards, including Best Actress nominations for both Knightley and Romola Garai (who played Briony aged 18). McGarvey, Durran and Sarah Greenwood were awarded the Best Technical Achievement accolade. At the 65th Golden Globe Awards, Atonement was named Best Drama Motion Picture, while Dario Marianelli won the Golden Globe Award for Best Original Score. The composer would go on to win five more awards for the score, as well as the Film Music Composition of the Year accolade from the International Film Music Critics Association. Intralink Film garnered two nominations from the Golden Trailer Awards and won the Best Romance Trailer category. Ronan won five awards for her performance including Best Actress in a Supporting Role at the 5th Irish Film & Television Awards and Best Young Actress from the Women Film Critics Circle. Atonement earned eight nominations from the London Film Critics' Circle; McAvoy and Vanessa Redgrave (who portrayed an elderly Briony) won the British Actor of the Year and British Supporting Actress of the Year awards respectively. Knightley won Best International Actress at the 2007 Rembrandt Awards and was given the Choice Movie Drama Actress accolade from the Teen Choice Awards. Hampton earned a total of thirteen nominations for the screenplay.

== Awards and nominations ==
Award	Date of ceremony	Category	Recipients	Result
Academy Awards	24 February 2008	Best Picture	Tim Bevan, Eric Fellner, Paul Webster	Nominated
Academy Awards	24 February 2008	Best Supporting Actress	Saoirse Ronan	Nominated
Academy Awards	24 February 2008	Best Adapted Screenplay	Christopher Hampton	Nominated
Academy Awards	24 February 2008	Best Art Direction	Sarah Greenwood and Katie Spencer	Nominated
Academy Awards	24 February 2008	Best Cinematography	Seamus McGarvey	Nominated
Academy Awards	24 February 2008	Best Costume Design	Jacqueline Durran	Nominated
Academy Awards	24 February 2008	Best Original Score	Dario Marianelli	Won
Alliance of Women Film Journalists	21 December 2007	Best Adapted Screenplay	Atonement	Nominated
Alliance of Women Film Journalists	21 December 2007	Best Depiction of Nudity or Sexuality	Keira Knightley	Nominated
Alliance of Women Film Journalists	21 December 2007	Best Editing	Atonement	Nominated
Alliance of Women Film Journalists	21 December 2007	Best Film	Atonement	Nominated
Alliance of Women Film Journalists	21 December 2007	Best Newcomer	Saoirse Ronan	Won
Alliance of Women Film Journalists	21 December 2007	Best Seduction	Keira Knightley and James McAvoy	Won
American Society of Cinematographers	26 January 2008	Outstanding Achievement in Theatrical Releases	Seamus McGarvey	Nominated
Art Directors Guild	18 February 2008	Excellence in Production Design for a Period Film	Sarah Greenwood	Nominated
British Academy Film Awards	10 February 2008	Best Actor	James McAvoy	Nominated
British Academy Film Awards	10 February 2008	Best Actress	Keira Knightley	Nominated
British Academy Film Awards	10 February 2008	Best Adapted Screenplay	Christopher Hampton	Nominated
British Academy Film Awards	10 February 2008	Best British Film	Atonement	Nominated
British Academy Film Awards	10 February 2008	Best Cinematography	Seamus McGarvey	Nominated
British Academy Film Awards	10 February 2008	Best Costume Design	Jacqueline Durran	Nominated
British Academy Film Awards	10 February 2008	Best Director	Joe Wright	Nominated
British Academy Film Awards	10 February 2008	Best Editing	Paul Tothill	Nominated
British Academy Film Awards	10 February 2008	Best Film	Atonement	Won
British Academy Film Awards	10 February 2008	Best Makeup and Hair	Ivana Primorac	Nominated
British Academy Film Awards	10 February 2008	Best Music	Dario Marianelli	Nominated
British Academy Film Awards	10 February 2008	Best Production Design	Sarah Greenwood and Katie Spencer	Won
British Academy Film Awards	10 February 2008	Best Sound	Danny Hambrook, Paul Hamblin, Catherine Hodgson, Becki Ponting	Nominated
British Academy Film Awards	10 February 2008	Best Supporting Actress	Saoirse Ronan	Nominated
British Society of Cinematographers	7 December 2007	Best Cinematography	Seamus McGarvey	Nominated
Broadcast Film Critics Association	7 January 2008	Best Composer	Dario Marianelli	Nominated
Broadcast Film Critics Association	7 January 2008	Best Director	Joe Wright	Nominated
Broadcast Film Critics Association	7 January 2008	Best Film	Atonement	Nominated
Broadcast Film Critics Association	7 January 2008	Best Supporting Actress	Vanessa Redgrave	Nominated
Broadcast Film Critics Association	7 January 2008	Best Young Actress	Saoirse Ronan	Nominated
Chicago Film Critics Association	13 December 2007	Best Adapted Screenplay	Christopher Hampton	Nominated
Chicago Film Critics Association	13 December 2007	Best Cinematography	Seamus McGarvey	Nominated
Chicago Film Critics Association	13 December 2007	Best Original Score	Dario Marianelli	Nominated
Cinema Brazil Grand Prize	14 April 2009	Best Foreign Feature Film	Atonement	Nominated
Costume Designers Guild	19 February 2008	Excellence in Costume Design for Period Film	Jacqueline Durran	Nominated
Dallas-Fort Worth Film Critics Association	17 December 2007	Best Picture	Atonement	Nominated
Dallas-Fort Worth Film Critics Association	17 December 2007	Best Supporting Actress	Saoirse Ronan	Nominated
Empire Awards	9 March 2008	Best Actor	James McAvoy	Won
Empire Awards	9 March 2008	Best Actress	Keira Knightley	Won
Empire Awards	9 March 2008	Best British Film	Atonement	Won
Empire Awards	9 March 2008	Best Director	Joe Wright	Nominated
Empire Awards	9 March 2008	Best Newcomer	Saoirse Ronan	Nominated
Empire Awards	9 March 2008	Best Soundtrack	Atonement	Nominated
European Film Awards	6 December 2008	Best Actor	James McAvoy	Nominated
European Film Awards	6 December 2008	Best Composer	Dario Marianelli	Nominated
European Film Awards	6 December 2008	Best Film	Atonement	Nominated
Evening Standard British Film Awards	3 February 2008	Best Actor	James McAvoy	Nominated
Evening Standard British Film Awards	3 February 2008	Best Actress	Romola Garai	Nominated
Evening Standard British Film Awards	3 February 2008	Best Actress	Keira Knightley	Nominated
Evening Standard British Film Awards	3 February 2008	Best Screenplay	Christopher Hampton	Nominated
Evening Standard British Film Awards	3 February 2008	Best Technical Achievement	Seamus McGarvey, Sarah Greenwood, Jacqueline Durran	Won
Film Critics Circle of Australia	1 February 2008	Best Foreign Film in the English Language	Atonement	Nominated
Golden Globe Awards	13 January 2008	Best Actor in a Drama Motion Picture	James McAvoy	Nominated
Golden Globe Awards	13 January 2008	Best Actress in a Drama Motion Picture	Keira Knightley	Nominated
Golden Globe Awards	13 January 2008	Best Director	Joe Wright	Nominated
Golden Globe Awards	13 January 2008	Best Drama Motion Picture	Atonement	Won
Golden Globe Awards	13 January 2008	Best Original Score	Dario Marianelli	Won
Golden Globe Awards	13 January 2008	Best Screenplay	Christopher Hampton	Nominated
Golden Globe Awards	13 January 2008	Best Supporting Actress	Saoirse Ronan	Nominated
Golden Tomato Awards	21 January 2008	Best Romance	Atonement	Won
Golden Trailer Awards	8 May 2008	Best Romance	Atonement – Intralink Film	Won
Golden Trailer Awards	8 May 2008	Best Romance TV Spot	Atonement "Love Story" – Intralink Film	Nominated
Houston Film Critics Society	3 January 2008	Best Cinematography	Seamus McGarvey	Nominated
Houston Film Critics Society	3 January 2008	Best Original Score	Dario Marianelli	Won
Houston Film Critics Society	3 January 2008	Best Picture	Atonement	Nominated
Houston Film Critics Society	3 January 2008	Best Screenplay	Christopher Hampton	Nominated
International Film Music Critics Association	15 February 2008	Best Original Score for a Drama Film	Atonement – Dario Marianelli	Won
International Film Music Critics Association	15 February 2008	Film Composer of the Year	Dario Marianelli	Nominated
International Film Music Critics Association	15 February 2008	Film Music Composition of the Year	"Elegy for Dunkirk" – Dario Marianelli	Won
International Film Music Critics Association	15 February 2008	Film Score of the Year	Atonement – Dario Marianelli	Won
Irish Film & Television Awards	17 February 2008	Best Actress in a Supporting Role	Saoirse Ronan	Won
Irish Film & Television Awards	17 February 2008	Best Director of Photography	Seamus McGarvey	Won
Irish Film & Television Awards	17 February 2008	Best International Actor	James McAvoy	Nominated
Irish Film & Television Awards	17 February 2008	Best International Actress	Keira Knightley	Nominated
Irish Film & Television Awards	17 February 2008	Best International Film	Atonement	Nominated
Ivor Novello Awards	22 May 2008	Best Original Film Score	Dario Marianelli	Won
London Film Critics' Circle	8 February 2008	British Actor of the Year	James McAvoy	Won
London Film Critics' Circle	8 February 2008	British Actress of the Year	Keira Knightley	Nominated
London Film Critics' Circle	8 February 2008	British Breakthrough	Saoirse Ronan	Nominated
London Film Critics' Circle	8 February 2008	British Director of the Year	Joe Wright	Nominated
London Film Critics' Circle	8 February 2008	British Film of the Year	Atonement	Nominated
London Film Critics' Circle	8 February 2008	British Supporting Actress of the Year	Vanessa Redgrave	Won
London Film Critics' Circle	8 February 2008	British Supporting Actress of the Year	Saoirse Ronan	Nominated
London Film Critics' Circle	8 February 2008	Screenwriter of the Year	Christopher Hampton	Nominated
Motion Picture Sound Editors	23 February 2008	Best Sound Editing in a Foreign Feature Film	Atonement	Nominated
Nastro d'Argento	14 June 2008	Best European Film Director	Joe Wright	Nominated
National Board of Review	5 December 2007	Top Ten Films	Atonement	Won
Online Film Critics Society	8 January 2008	Best Adapted Screenplay	Christopher Hampton	Nominated
Online Film Critics Society	8 January 2008	Best Editing	Paul Tothill	Nominated
Online Film Critics Society	8 January 2008	Best Original Score	Dario Marianelli	Nominated
Online Film Critics Society	8 January 2008	Best Picture	Atonement	Nominated
Online Film Critics Society	8 January 2008	Best Supporting Actress	Saoirse Ronan	Nominated
Pyongyang International Film Festival	26 September 2008	Shooting and Fine Arts Award	Atonement	Won
Rembrandt Award	10 March 2008	Best International Actress	Keira Knightley	Won
Richard Attenborough Film Awards	30 January 2008	Best Actor	James McAvoy	Won
Richard Attenborough Film Awards	30 January 2008	Best Film-maker	Joe Wright	Won
Richard Attenborough Film Awards	30 January 2008	Best Screenwriter	Christopher Hampton	Won
Richard Attenborough Film Awards	30 January 2008	Film of the Year	Atonement	Won
San Diego Film Critics Society	18 December 2007	Best Editing	Paul Tothill	Won
Satellite Awards	16 December 2007	Best Actress in a Drama Motion Picture	Keira Knightley	Nominated
Satellite Awards	16 December 2007	Best Adapted Screenplay	Christopher Hampton	Won
Satellite Awards	16 December 2007	Best Costume Design	Jacqueline Durran	Nominated
Satellite Awards	16 December 2007	Best Original Score	Dario Marianelli	Nominated
Satellite Awards	16 December 2007	Best Supporting Actress	Saoirse Ronan	Nominated
St. Louis Gateway Film Critics Association	24 December 2007	Best Cinematography	Seamus McGarvey	Nominated
St. Louis Gateway Film Critics Association	24 December 2007	Best Picture	Atonement	Nominated
St. Louis Gateway Film Critics Association	24 December 2007	Best Score	Dario Marianelli	Nominated
St. Louis Gateway Film Critics Association	24 December 2007	Best Screenplay	Ian McEwan and Christopher Hampton	Nominated
St. Louis Gateway Film Critics Association	24 December 2007	Best Supporting Actress	Saoirse Ronan	Nominated
Teen Choice Awards	26 August 2007	Choice Movie Drama Actress	Keira Knightley	Won
USC Scripter Awards	2 February 2008	Best Screenplay	Ian McEwan and Christopher Hampton	Nominated
Venice International Film Festival	8 September 2007	Golden Lion	Atonement	Nominated
Venice International Film Festival	8 September 2007	Prize of the Forum for Cinema and Literature	Joe Wright	Won
Women Film Critics Circle	13 December 2007	Best Young Actress	Saoirse Ronan	Won
World Soundtrack Awards	18 October 2008	Best Original Score of the Year	Atonement – Dario Marianelli	Won
World Soundtrack Awards	18 October 2008	Soundtrack Composer of the Year	Dario Marianelli	Nominated
Young Artist Awards	30 March 2008	Best Performance by a Leading Young Actress	Saoirse Ronan	Nominated
