= Control (2007 film) =

2007 film by Anton Corbijn

- Theatrical release poster
- Directed by: Anton Corbijn
- Screenplay by: Matt Greenhalgh
- Based on: Touching from a Distance by Deborah Curtis
- Produced by: Anton Corbijn; Todd Eckert; Orian Williams; Iain Canning; Peter Heslop; Tony Wilson; Deborah Curtis
- Starring: Samantha Morton; Sam Riley; Alexandra Maria Lara
- Cinematography: Martin Ruhe
- Edited by: Andrew Hulme
- Music by: New Order
- Distributed by: Momentum Pictures (United Kingdom); The Weinstein Company (United States)
- Release date: 26 September 2007
- Running time: 122 minutes
- Countries: United Kingdom; United States
- Language: English
- Budget: $6.4 million
- Box office: $8.9 million

Control is a 2007 biographical film about the life of Ian Curtis, singer of the late-1970s English rock band Joy Division. It is the first feature film directed by Anton Corbijn, who had worked with Joy Division as a photographer. The screenplay by Matt Greenhalgh was based on the biography Touching from a Distance by Curtis's widow Deborah, who served as a co-producer on the film. Tony Wilson, who released Joy Division's records through his Factory Records label, also served as a co-producer. Curtis' bandmates Bernard Sumner, Peter Hook, and Stephen Morris provided incidental music for the soundtrack via their post-Joy Division incarnation New Order. Control was filmed partly on location in Nottingham, Manchester, and Macclesfield, including areas where Curtis lived, and was shot in colour and then printed to black-and-white. Its title comes from the Joy Division song "She's Lost Control", and alludes to the fact that much of the plot deals with the notion that Curtis tried to remain in control of his own life, and yet had no control over his epilepsy and pharmaceutical side effects.

Samantha Morton and Sam Riley star as Deborah and Ian Curtis, and the film portrays the events of the couple's lives from 1973 to 1980, focusing on their marriage, the formation and career of Joy Division, Ian's struggle with epilepsy, his extramarital affair with Belgian journalist Annik Honoré, and culminates with Ian's suicide in May 1980. Alexandra Maria Lara plays Honoré, while James Anthony Pearson, Joe Anderson, and Harry Treadaway play Sumner, Hook, and Morris, respectively. The film also features Toby Kebbell as band manager Rob Gretton and Craig Parkinson as Tony Wilson.

Control premiered at the Cannes Film Festival on 17 May 2007 where it won several awards including the Director's Fortnight, the CICAE Art & Essai prize for best film, the Regards Jeunes Prize for best first/second directed feature film, and the Europa Cinemas Label prize for best European film in the sidebar. It also received a special mention for the Caméra d'Or prize for best debut feature film. It went on to win five British Independent Film Awards including Best Film, Best Director for Corbijn, Most Promising Newcomer for Riley, and Best Supporting Actor for Kebbell. It was named Best Film at the 2007 Evening Standard British Film Awards, and Greenhalgh was given the Carl Foreman award for outstanding achievement in his first feature film at the 61st British Academy Film Awards.

== Plot ==
In 1975, Ian Curtis and Debbie Woodruff marry in their home town of Macclesfield, south of Manchester, England, at ages 19 and 18 respectively. Ian retreats from domestic life, preferring to write poetry in solitude. On 4 June 1976 they attend a Sex Pistols concert with Bernard Sumner, Peter Hook, and Terry Mason, who are starting a band. Mesmerized by the concert, Ian volunteers to be their singer. They name themselves Warsaw, and Terry moves into a managerial role with the addition of drummer Stephen Morris. The band debuts on 19 May 1977 and soon rename themselves Joy Division. At year's end, Ian and Debbie finance the group's first EP, An Ideal for Living.

During his job as an employment agent, Ian witnesses his client Corinne Lewis suffering an epileptic seizure. Unsatisfied with the brief mention Joy Division receives from television host Tony Wilson, Ian demands that he put the band on his programme. In April 1978 Joy Division plays a battle of bands, impressing Tony and Rob Gretton, who becomes their new manager. They perform "Transmission" on Tony's programme and sign to his Factory Records label; Tony signs the contract using his blood.

In December 1978 Ian suffers a seizure on the way back from the band's first London gig. He is diagnosed with epilepsy and prescribed medications that leave him drowsy and moody. Learning that Corinne has died of a seizure, he writes "She's Lost Control" about her. He begins to neglect Debbie, who gives birth to their daughter Natalie in April 1979. Ian quits his job to go on tour, leaving Debbie to work and care for the baby.

Ian admits to Belgian journalist Annik Honoré that he is miserable at home and considers his marriage a mistake. The two begin having an affair during Joy Division's January 1980 European tour. On returning home, Ian tells Debbie he is unsure if he still loves her. During the rehearsing of "Love Will Tear Us Apart", Rob informs the band that they will be departing 19 May for a tour of the United States. Debbie finds evidence of Ian's infidelity and confronts him. He promises that the affair is over but continues to see Annik during the recording of Closer in Islington.

Ian suffers a seizure mid-performance and is comforted by Annik, who admits she is falling in love with him. He attempts suicide by overdosing on phenobarbital but doctors save his life. He continues to perform but is exhausted by the strain and overwhelmed by the audience's expectations. At a performance at Bury's Derby Hall the stress proves too much and he is only briefly able to go onstage. The audience riots when Alan Hempstall of Crispy Ambulance steps in to cover for Ian and the gig is ruined. Ian tells Tony that he believes everyone hates him and that it is all his fault. When Debbie learns that Ian is still seeing Annik, she demands a divorce. Bernard attempts to use hypnotherapy on Ian, who then goes to stay with his parents. He writes to Annik admitting his fear that his epilepsy will eventually kill him and confesses that he loves her.

On 17 May 1980, two nights before Joy Division is due to depart for America, Ian returns home and begs Debbie not to divorce him. When she refuses, he angrily orders her out of the house. After drinking alone and writing Debbie a letter, he has another seizure. Regaining consciousness the following morning, he hangs himself from the Sheila Maid in the kitchen. Debbie discovers his body and staggers into the street, crying for help. The news of Ian's death leaves the remaining Joy Division members stunned, while Tony consoles Annik. As Ian's body is cremated, the group gather in a café with Gillian Gilbert, foreshadowing the future of the band.

== Cast ==
- Samantha Morton as Deborah Curtis, wife of Ian Curtis. The film is based on Deborah's memoir on the experience with Ian Curtis and Joy Division. Though Morton dislikes biopics, she said Control was different in that she is a fan of Joy Division, and likes Deborah's book as well as Corbijn's photography.
- Sam Riley as Ian Curtis, the singer of Joy Division. Riley was relatively unknown before the film, and the director initially considered Cillian Murphy for the role, but later changed his mind because he viewed Murphy as "a little shorter than Ian". Jude Law was also considered, but the director wanted an unknown actor instead.
- Alexandra Maria Lara as Annik Honoré, a journalist from Belgium who has an affair with Ian Curtis after interviewing the band.
- Joe Anderson as Peter Hook, the bass player of Joy Division.
- Toby Kebbell as Rob Gretton, the manager of the band, succeeding Terry Mason.
- Craig Parkinson as Tony Wilson, the owner of Factory Records, the company that distributes Joy Division's recordings.
- James Anthony Pearson as Bernard Sumner, the guitarist and keyboardist of Joy Division.
- Harry Treadaway as Stephen Morris, the drummer and percussionist of Joy Division.

In addition: Ben Naylor appears as Factory Records co-founder Martin Hannett; performance poet John Cooper Clarke appears as himself, performing his poem "Evidently Chickentown" in a re-creation of a 1970s concert; Lotti Closs plays Gillian Gilbert, Stephen Morris' girlfriend, and future member of New Order; Richard Bremmer and Mary Jo Randle appear as Ian's father and Deborah's mother, respectively; and Matthew McNulty plays Nick, Ian's friend and Debbie's boyfriend prior to Ian.

== Production ==
Corbijn had been a devout Joy Division fan since the band's early days in the late 1970s. After moving to England, he befriended the band and shot several pictures for NME, which boosted his career as a photographer. Some of his pictures taken are featured in the film. He also directed the music video for the 1988 rerelease of "Atmosphere". He said that the film overlapped with his own life in some ways. "I had moved to England to be close to that music at the time, and I was very into Joy Division. I worked with them, took pictures of them that became synonymous with their music, and I was forever linked. Then eight years after [Ian Curtis'] death, I did the video for "Atmosphere." So in other people's eyes I was always connected with them."

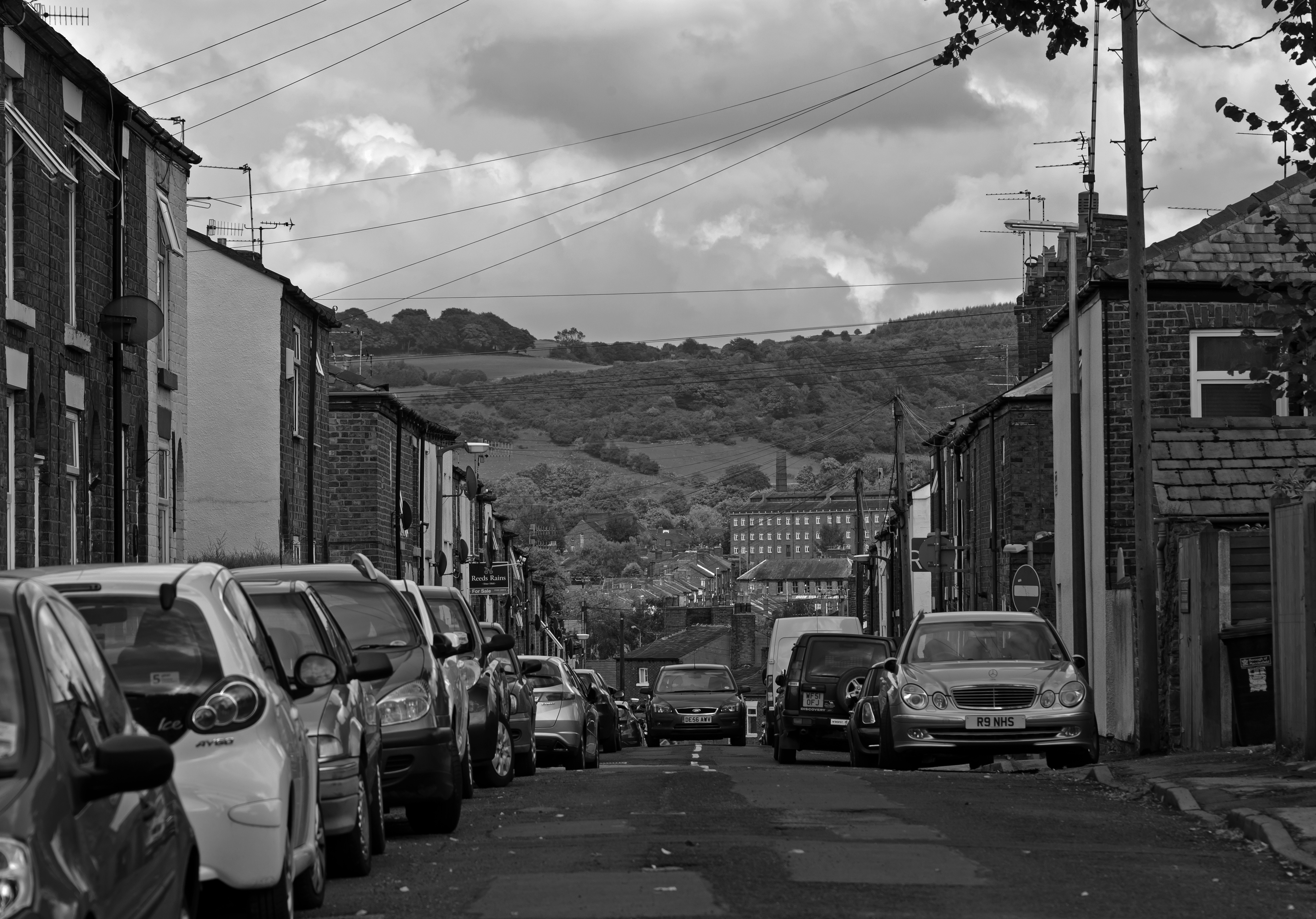
Barton Street in Macclesfield, 2014, shot in colour and processed in black and white as Corbijn did, similar to a scene in the film

Control is Corbijn's debut as a film director, and he paid half of the €4.5 million budget out of his own pocket. The film was shot on colour stock and printed to black and white to "reflect the atmosphere of Joy Division and the mood of the era". Todd Eckert and Orian Williams are the producers. Deborah Curtis, Ian Curtis' widow, is a co-producer, along with music mogul Tony Wilson, who died months before the film's release. It was Wilson who gave Joy Division their TV break on the local magazine programme Granada Reports, and he also founded Factory Records, which released most of Joy Division's work.

After the script for the film was finished in May 2005, the film was shot at the former Carlton studios in Nottingham, and on location in Nottingham, Manchester and Macclesfield, England, as well as other European venues. Filming began on 3 July 2006 and lasted for seven weeks. Filming in and around Barton Street (where Curtis lived and died), Macclesfield took place on 11 and 12 July 2006. EM Media, the Regional Screen Agency for the East Midlands, invested £250,000 of European Regional Development Funds into the production of Control and supported the film throughout the shoot.

Ian Curtis' daughter, Natalie, was in the crowd as an extra for the Derby Hall gig.

The final scene of the film is shot in the exact position where Ian Curtis's memorial stone is located in Macclesfield with the camera panning out to reveal the crematorium which can be seen directly from his memorial.

== Release ==
The Weinstein Company secured the rights to release the film in North America after its success at Cannes. The DVD was released in the UK on 11 February 2008, followed by the Australian DVD on 12 March 2008, and the North American DVD on 3 June 2008.

=== Box office ===
The film grossed $8.9 million worldwide.

== Reception ==
Peter Bradshaw, the chief film reviewer for The Guardian, described Control as "the best film of the year: a tender, bleakly funny and superbly acted biopic of Curtis". Prominent American film critic Roger Ebert gave the film a three and a half stars rating, out of four, and wrote that "The extraordinary achievement of Control is that it works simultaneously as a musical biopic and the story of a life."

Review aggregator website Rotten Tomatoes reports an 88% approval rating with an average rating of 7.5/10 based on 119 reviews. The website's consensus reads, "Control is a work of art, thanks to its evocative black and white cinematography and sensational performances from Sam Riley and Samantha Morton. Even those not familiar with Joy Division can still appreciate the beauty of the film." Metacritic reports the film as having an average score of 78 out of 100, based on 27 reviews, claiming the film had "generally favourable reviews".

However, some reviewers were less positive. Ray Bennett from Reuters described Control to be a "disappointment" and said the film "features lots of music from that time and has decent performances, but it fails to make the case for its fallen star".

=== Reaction from band members ===
Peter Hook and Stephen Morris, two of the founding members of Joy Division, generally praised the film. Morris disputed its accuracy, saying "[n]one of it's true really", but acknowledged the need to bend facts because "the truth is too boring." Hook criticised the preview audience's reaction, saying how at the end of the film "it really hurt and everybody started clapping. It would've been nice to have a dignified silence". Hook also remarked that "Control is a hell of a lot more accurate than 24 Hour Party People. You can tell that Anton knew us, and he knew us well and he took the original script, which was very English and quite subtly he made it deeper and have a broader appeal so that it would not just make sense to an English audience but to an international audience". After viewing the film at Cannes, Hook said he "knew it was a great film and that it would be very well received because, even though it's two hours long, only two people went to the toilet the whole time. In fact, one of them was [Sumner]. The other one was a 70-year-old woman".

== Soundtrack ==
Music From The Motion Picture Control

Soundtrack album
- Released: 30 October 2007
- Genres: Post-punk, punk rock, glam rock
- Labels: Warner Bros., Rhino

Professional ratings
Review scores
Source	Rating
Allmusic	4/5 stars

The Killers cover the 1979 Joy Division song "Shadowplay" on the soundtrack. However, all live Joy Division performances in the film are performed by the actors. The actors contribute a cover of an original Joy Division song ("Transmission") to the soundtrack. Incidental tracks by 1970s artists including David Bowie, Kraftwerk and Buzzcocks are the original recordings. New Order provided the original incidental music for the soundtrack.

=== Track listing ===
No.	Title	Writer(s)	Performer	Length
1.	"Exit"	Bernard Sumner, Peter Hook, Stephen Morris	New Order	1:14
2.	"What Goes On" (from The Velvet Underground, 1969)	Lou Reed	The Velvet Underground	5:07
3.	"Shadowplay" (originally performed by Joy Division)	Ian Curtis, Hook, Morris, Sumner	The Killers	4:11
4.	"Boredom" (live; from Live at the Roxy Club April '77, 1989)	Howard Devoto, Pete Shelley	Buzzcocks	3:07
5.	"Dead Souls" (from "Atmosphere", 1980)	Curtis, Hook, Morris, Sumner	Joy Division	4:51
6.	"She Was Naked" (1970 single)	Robert Jan Stips	Supersister	3:53
7.	"Sister Midnight" (from The Idiot, 1977)	Iggy Pop, David Bowie, Carlos Alomar	Iggy Pop	4:18
8.	"Love Will Tear Us Apart" (1980 single)	Curtis, Hook, Morris, Sumner	Joy Division	3:26
9.	"Hypnosis"	Sumner, Hook, Morris	New Order	1:35
10.	"Drive-In Saturday" (from Aladdin Sane, 1973)	Bowie	David Bowie	4:31
11.	"Evidently Chickentown" (live)	John Cooper Clarke	John Cooper Clarke	0:31
12.	"2HB" (from Roxy Music, 1972)	Bryan Ferry	Roxy Music	4:29
13.	"Transmission" (originally performed by Joy Division)	Curtis, Hook, Morris, Sumner	Joe Anderson, James Anthony Pearson, Sam Riley, and Harry Treadaway	3:02
14.	"Autobahn" (from Autobahn, 1974)	Ralf Hütter, Florian Schneider, Emil Schult	Kraftwerk	11:23
15.	"Atmosphere" (1980 single)	Curtis, Hook, Morris, Sumner	Joy Division	4:33
16.	"Warszawa" (from Low, 1977)	Bowie, Brian Eno	David Bowie	6:21
17.	"Get Out"	Sumner, Hook, Morris	New Order	2:42
