= Angry Kid =

British TV and YouTube series by Aardman Animations

- Logo from the first and second series; the logo is green in the third and fourth series
- Genre: Adult animation; Black comedy; Surreal humour
- Created by: Darren Walsh
- Written by: Darren Walsh; Mike Booth; Mike Cooper; Keiron Self; Clayton Saunders
- Directed by: Darren Walsh
- Starring: Darren Walsh; David Holt; Mike Cooper; Beth Chalmers; Kevin Eldon; Jo Allen; Kieran Argo; Mindell Bowen; Doug Wort; Richard Webber
- Theme music composer: Will Hodge
- Opening theme: "Angry Kid"
- Ending theme: "Angry Kid"
- Composers: Stuart Gordon; The Insects; Will Hodge
- Country of origin: United Kingdom
- Original language: English
- No. of series: 4
- No. of episodes: 70

Production
- Executive producers: Peter Lord (S1-2); David Sproxton (S1-2); Liz Keynes (S1)
- Producers: Michael Rose (S1); Jo Allen (S1); Jacky Chrisp (S2); Julie Lockhart (S2); Russell McLean (S3-4)
- Cinematography: Mark Chamberlain
- Running time: 1-22 minutes
- Production companies: Aardman Animations; Mr Morris Productions

Original release
- Network: Channel 4 (1998–2002); BBC Three (2003–2006); YouTube (2007–2019)
- Release: 5 December 1998 – 8 November 2019

Related
- Rex the Runt

Angry Kid is a British adult animated comedy television and web series created, directed, written, and designed by Darren Walsh and produced by Aardman Animations for Series 1 and 2 and by Mr Morris Productions for Series 3 and 4.

Unlike most Aardman productions, Angry Kid was not created using clay animation but a combination of pixilation (using actors in a form of stop motion puppetry) with masks for facial expressions. Series 3 onwards uses CGI for Angry Kid's head, along with live action. The series also aired in the United States on MTV.

Series 1 and 2 have been released on DVD by Pathé and 2Entertain respectively. All the Angry Kid animations from before the third series were on Atom.com before the site was absorbed into Comedy Central. A compilation DVD called Aardman's Dark Side was also released, and it contains several Series 2 episodes and an exclusive episode. The vast majority of Angry Kid has since been released on YouTube.

After an 8-year hiatus, Series 3 was launched on 3 July 2015 with the episode 'Interview'. Series 4 launched 4 years later in September 2019.

Unlike the first two series, Series 3 and 4 were exclusively released on the official Angry Kid YouTube page, with new episodes appearing every three weeks.

The fourth series concluded on 8 November 2019, and the channel did not upload again until 2025 when they started uploading compilations.

== Cast ==
Angry Kid

- Darren Walsh as Angry Kid, the title character and antihero. He is a redheaded boy who has a foul mouth and a terrible attitude. He does not care who he steps on or what trouble he causes as long as it gets him what he needs or wants. Angry Kid is almost always seen wearing a dark blue parka jacket with a furry hood (even over his pyjamas). He is known by police officers as "the little ginger git on the bike". He is also known as "Stanners" and the description for the pilot refers to him as "Charlie". Angry Kid lives with his parents and his younger sister in the TV series but in the special episode "Who Do I Think I Am?", his mother abandons the family, though by Series 3, she has reconnected with Angry Kid and is now in a relationship with a man named Stephen. He also has a bull Terrier named Scoffchops, who regularly attacks him.
- David Holt as Dad, Angry Kid's unseen father. He has an obsession for country and western music which he often plays in the car. He hits Angry Kid with his newspaper when everytime the latter says or does something stupid or annoying. In Who Do You Think You Are?, when he shows Angry Kid some home videos, his full body (apart from his face) is shown. He also plays the Teacher, who only appears in the setting of Angry Kid and Speccy's classroom. According to Who Do I Think I Am, the teacher is a male who happens to have a feminine-sounding voice, much to Angry Kid's confusion So far, he has only been in two episodes, both of which are specials: Darkside and Who do I Think I Am?
- David Holt / Beth Chalmers as Lil' Sis, Angry Kid's younger sister. Her brother torments and teases her, to which she sometimes retaliates. Despite being smaller and younger than Angry Kid, she is much smarter. She seldom speaks, but she has a speaking part in the episode "Horror," in which she is possessed by an evil spirit. She also speaks in the Who Do I Think I Am? special, the Aardman's Dark Side exclusive episode and in Series 4.
- David Holt / Kevin Eldon as Speccy, Angry Kid's nerdy "best friend" that is allergic to nuts (as revealed in "Swollen"). Speccy is often picked on by Angry Kid, who is cruel to him. In Who Do I Think I Am?, it is revealed that Speccy's real name is Myles.

Other voice actors include Mike Cooper and Jo Allen.

== Episodes ==
=== Production ===
Series 1 and 2 were produced by Aardman Animations. Series 3 and 4 were distributed by Aardman Animations and produced by Mr Morris Productions.

Series	Episodes	Originally released	
Series	Episodes	First released	Last released
1	25	5 December 1998	2000
2	25	2001	2002
3	11	3 July 2015	4 March 2016
4	9	10 September 2019	8 November 2019
Specials		24 December 2004	3 March 2016

=== Series 1 (1998–2000) ===
Angry Kids Series 1
No. overall	No. in season	Title
1	1	"Car Sick"
2	2	"Bored"
3	3	"Goalie"
4	4	"Blood Juice"
5	5	"Road Hog"
6	6	"Stinky"
7	7	"Headlights"
8	8	"Cotton Bud"
9	9	"Sex Education"
10	10	"Bone"
11	11	"Captain Thunderpants"
12	12	"Swearing"
13	13	"Queen's Speech"
14	14	"Hard Face"
15	15	"Chips"
16	16	"Superhero"
17	17	"Love Bite"
18	18	"Buzz Off"
19	19	"Backwards Writing"
20	20	"Hoax Call"
21	21	"Wee Wee"
22	22	"Speed"
23	23	"Sneeze"
24	24	"Horror"
25	25	"Kidnap"

=== Series 2 (2001–02) ===
Angry Kids Series 2
No. overall	No. in season	Title
26	1	"Wanker"
27	2	"Catapult"
28	3	"I Spy"
29	4	"Sex Call"
30	5	"Strange Trip"
31	6	"Card Trick"
32	7	"Philosophical"
33	8	"Puerile"
34	9	"Curious"
35	10	"Russian Roulette"
36	11	"Tourettes"
37	12	"Piss"
38	13	"Swollen"
39	14	"Bad News"
40	15	"Cake"
41	16	"Chemistry"
42	17	"Dustbin"
43	18	"Dolly"
44	19	"Sofa Attack"
45	20	"Snail"
46	21	"Jackanory (Note: Replaced in modern releases with a revised edition that adjusts the timing of certain scenes and dubs over a particular line to remove the use of the now-homophobic term "Bender")"
47	22	"Marathon Man"
48	23	"Road Safety"
49	24	"Birdie"
50	25	"What Are You Like?"

=== Series 3 (2015–16) ===
Angry Kids Series 3
No. overall	No. in season	Title
51	1	"Fish Factzz"
52	2	"Boyhood"
53	3	"Interview"
54	4	"Workout"
55	5	"Stephen"
56	6	"Mind Control"
57	7	"Bumfluff"
58	8	"Puberty"
59	9	"Emo"
60	10	"Vaccination"
61	11	"How To: Make a Donald Trump Xmas Decoration"

=== Series 4 (2019) ===
Angry Kids Series 4
No. overall	No. in season	Title
62	1	"Callout"
63	2	"Lil' Sis"
64	3	"Perfect Body"
65	4	"Mars"
66	5	"Offstep"
67	6	"Careers Advice"
68	7	"Politics"
69	8	"Fartburger"
70	9	"Sponsored Silence"

=== Specials ===
Angry Kids Specials
No. overall	No. in season	Title
1	1	"Who Do I Think I Am?"
A 23-minute special, broadcast on BBC Three at 7:30 pm on Christmas Eve, 2004. The plot focuses on Angry Kid, who is given the task to write a 10-page essay for his teacher on who he really thinks he is. Despite their efforts, his dad and his friend Speccy are of no help, and neither is a website he finds online, but later he gets the aid of Lil' Sis, who wants all of his possessions in return for writing the essay, to which he reluctantly agrees. The special ends with Angry Kid reading out the essay written by his sister about who he really is before being punished by having an intense workout session in the school gymnasium under the supervision of an evil gym teacher.
2	2	"Handbags"
Angry Kid raps, with the Flaming Choppers, in a music video called "Handbags," telling the story of how the kids (which, oddly, look exactly like him) playing football also use handbags. The song was released as a single on 29 May 2006 by Musicalities Ltd.: No. / Title / Writer(s) / Length; 1. / "Handbags (Roody Bum Mix)" (full version) / Darren Walsh and Rowlands / 2:49; 2. / "Handbags (Radio Edit)" (Version in the music video) / Darren Walsh and Rowlands / 2:04; 3. / "Handbags (Instrumental)" / Darren Walsh and Rowlands / 2:47; 4. / "Handbags (Karaoke Mix)" / Darren Walsh and Rowlands / 2:46
3	3	"Gridlock"
Angry Kid and the other characters sing in a music video called "Gridlock," telling the story of how the kids were stuck in a traffic jam and everyone was fighting with each other. It was part of Aardman's Live Earth series.
4	4	"Angry Kid's Dark Side"
A straight-to-DVD episode featured on Aardman's Dark Side DVD. Angry Kid is running in the forest, where he finds a bandaged-up version of himself as a girl. Angry Kid soon realizes that it is just a nightmare, and the imagery used here is also a reference to a scene from the 1981 horror cult classic film: An American Werewolf in London. Lil' Sis comes into his bedroom to ask if he is all right, and asks if he can play with her, but then she splits in two before him, which turns out to be yet another nightmare in reference to The Shining. He wakes up again to find Speccy is at the foot of his bed, talking about maths and triangles. Angry Kid calls his nightmare nonsense, and Speccy dryly retorts that the real nightmare is when he wakes up. Angry Kid then realises that he is at school wearing a dress. Angry Kid is promptly told off by his teacher before Speccy keeps saying, "There's no place like home" 3 times (a reference to The Wizard of Oz). Angry Kid then hits Speccy with a shoe, and the nightmares end.
5	5	"Merry Christmas Stocking Song"
Angry Kid sings an acoustic Christmas song called Merry Christmas Stocking Song. The video comes to Angry Kid is celebrating the side of a Christmas tree with an average of Santa Claus and he wanted to know what you got for Christmas. And he was given a leg. The video was recorded in 2004 and can be seen on YouTube. At the end of the video says: Happy Christmas from Angry Kid.
6	6	"My Vloggy"
A three part special released over December 2015. In My Exclusive Movie Review No.1, Angry Kid reviews what he claims is the Star Wars: The Force Awakens. In How To: Make a Donald Trump Xmas Decoration, Angry Kid shows how to make the figure out of a potato and shredded wheat. In My Christmas Vloggy, Angry Kid shows the presents he received including Marmite toothpaste and dog excrement in a box.
7	7	"Call Out!"
Angry Kid asks the audience if there is something they would like him to comment on.

== See also ==
- Rex the Runt - another Aardman adult animated series starring Richard Goleszowski.
