= Jo Allen (animation producer) =

English animation producer

- Born: England
- Occupation: Animation producer
- Years active: 1990s–present

Jo Allen is an English animation producer. She is known for producing The Pearce Sisters (2007) and voicing Lil' Sis in Angry Kid (1999).

== Awards and nominations ==
She won a BAFTA Award for Best Short Animation for The Pearce Sisters (2007).

== Filmography ==
Television
Year	Title	Role	Notes
1999	Angry Kid	Lil' Sis	Voice

== As a producer ==
Producer
Year	Title	Role	Notes
2007	The Pearce Sisters		Short
