= Burn It (TV series) =

- Genre: Drama
- Written by: Matt Greenhalgh
- Directed by: John Duthie; Adam Rowley
- Starring: Chris Coghill; Kieran O'Brien; William Ash; Lisa Faulkner; Mel B Chelsee Healey; Marsha Thomason; Iain McKee
- Country of origin: United Kingdom
- Original language: English
- No. of series: 2
- No. of episodes: 21

Production
- Production locations: Manchester, Greater Manchester, England, United Kingdom
- Running time: 29 minutes
- Production company: Red Production Company

Original release
- Network: BBC Three
- Release: 9 February – 10 November 2003

Burn It is a drama series following the lives of six friends approaching their thirties. It was written by Matt Greenhalgh.

== Plot ==
The series followed Carl, Andy and Jon as three self-proclaimed Generation X-ers going through life without any real responsibilities to worry them. However, whilst this was understandable in the Madchester era of the late 1980s, is it acceptable now as they approach thirty? When does the party end? The responsibilities of potential fatherhood are weighing down on each in a different way: Carl's girlfriend is desperate for commitment, Jon is torturing himself over the daughter he gave up for adoption when he was 17, and Andy discovers that it is he who may be soon enjoying the pleasures of being a parent. This sets off a series of events, leading each to explore their new challenges and grow past their Gen X labels. Jon slowly builds a relationship with both his daughter and her mother (Tina). While, Andy's relationship with Emma experiences its ups and downs, with an unfortunate ending. Carl attempts to settle both his financial and personal life to that of an adult.

In Season 2, Carl and Emma are in love, although Carl is reluctant to broadcast the fact. Forced to do so has negative effects on his friendships. Jon begins a downward spiral that ends with a second suicide attempt forcing him to grow up and become a parent. Andy returns and havoc for Carl and Emma soon ensue. By the end of the series each character has found their place in the world.

== Production ==
Burn It was written by Matt Greenhalgh and produced by Red Production Company, an organisation most notable for its many cutting-edge, northern dramas such as Clocking Off, Conviction , New Street Law and Linda Green. To a soundtrack of North West England bands and musicians, including New Order, The Stone Roses and The Charlatans to name but a few, the show displayed a lazy world of drinking, drug consumption, and casual sex. However, the show was careful to show the consequences of such lifestyle choices and searingly touched on suicide, unwanted pregnancies, apathy and disillusionment. According to Red Production Company a DVD release is not possible due to difficulty in clearing copyrights for music used.

== Broadcast ==
Burn It was first shown on the free-to-air British digital channel BBC Three, and then repeated some months later on the terrestrial channel BBC Two. There were two series of Burn It: series one consisted of ten approximately 30-minute episodes and ran from 9 February 2003 to 8 April 2003; the second series spanned eleven episodes and ran from 8 September 2003 to 10 November 2003.

== Cast ==
=== Main ===
- Chris Coghill as Carl Redmond: A 29-year-old self employed builder who asks himself about his choices in life. After finishing a 7-year relationship, he tries to find new dates, but falls in love with Emma.
- Kieran O'Brien as Andy Grimshaw: A postman who lives an unstable life of ups and downs with Emma. He decides to marry Emma, but does not know that she slept with his friend Carl.
- William Ash as Jon Marr: A guy tortured by the memory of leaving his newborn daughter for adoption with his ex-girlfriend 14 years earlier. He meets the girl's adoptive family and has the chance to do the right things this time.
- Lisa Faulkner as Emma Wainwright: Andy's girlfriend, who is tired of his irresponsible and unstable attitude. After sleeping with her friend Carl, she is confronted by Andy with a request for marriage and has to choose between telling the truth or burying it forever.
- Mel B as Claire McAdams: Emma's humorous and sarcastic best friend and Jon's love interest.
- Chelsee Healey as Katie Marshall: Tina and Jon's daughter, who hates the father for the past.
- Marsha Thomason as Tina Marshall: Katie's mother. At first, she hates Jon's appearance after 14 years, but decides to give him a chance as a father.
- Iain McKee as Paul Marshall: Carl, Jon and Andy's humorous but naive friend, who is incapable of keeping a job for more than extremely short periods of time.

=== Recurring ===
- Tony Nyland as Jack the pub landlord.
- Jessica Harris as Kelly: The 18-year-old daughter of one of a Carl's clients, with whom he has a relationship.
- Tracie Bennett as Bev
- Ursula Holden Gill as Helen

== Episode ==
Series One

Episode One

The responsibilities of potential fatherhood are weighing down on each in a different way: Carl's girlfriend is desperate for commitment and so announces she is pregnant to Carl in order to ensure he does not split up with her. However, he then finds out she is on her period and thus not pregnant and leaves her for lying to him. Jon is torturing himself over the daughter he gave up for adoption when he was 17, whilst Emma sets him up on a blind date with her friend Claire. Andy, having ribbed Carl about becoming a parent, discovers that it is he who may be soon enjoying the pleasures of being a parent.

Whilst on a job, Carl meets Kelly, the 18-year-old daughter of one of his clients.

Episode Two

Jon takes drastic action when he finds out that his parents are divorcing and that he has no right to have contact with his daughter. Meanwhile, Andy is uncertain about girlfriend Emma's decision to abort their baby, and Carl having fun with 18-year-old Kelly, the daughter of one of his clients.

Episode Three

Carl pledges to help Jon find his daughter, but the first step is to find Tina. Emma demands a change of lifestyle after Andy is attacked on his round.

Episode Four

Jon's sudden appearance in Tina's life has opened up a can of worms. Andy's lack of ambition is starting to irritate Emma. Carl also has a problem - it's his 30th birthday and only Andy wants to go out.

Episode Five

Jon is loving his new role as a dad, but it is not all plain sailing. A restless Carl feels Australia beckoning. Emma finds her loyalties put to the test.

Episode Six

Andy and Emma's break-up leads to a one-night stand for Emma, and unprecedented feelings of jealousy and remorse for Andy.

Episode Seven

Jon faces some angry attempts at blackmail from his new-found daughter, who is still stung by the belief that she was abandoned. Andy and Emma throw an engagement party. Carl deals with his growing feelings for Emma by getting drunk.

Episode Eight

Carl is feeling tortured with guilt. Jon is brooding over Tina. Emma has made a drastic decision, but a phone call throws everything into turmoil.

Episode Nine

Jon tells the truth about the adoption and more. Andy asks the boys to throw him a stag night. Carl shirks the duties of Carl's stag night. An emergency cuts the night short.

Episode Ten

After the death of his mum, Emma vows to make Andy happy. Tina has news for Jon. Is Carl breaking up the lads' friendship for good?

== Award Nominations ==
2003 Royal Television Society North West Awards, Best Cable Programme
2003 Royal Television Society North West Awards, Best Performance In A Network Drama, Chris Coghill
