= Atonement (2007 film) =

2007 film by Joe Wright

- Theatrical release poster
- Directed by: Joe Wright
- Screenplay by: Christopher Hampton
- Based on: Atonement by Ian McEwan
- Produced by: Tim Bevan; Eric Fellner; Paul Webster
- Starring: James McAvoy; Keira Knightley; Saoirse Ronan; Romola Garai; Vanessa Redgrave
- Cinematography: Seamus McGarvey
- Edited by: Paul Tothill
- Music by: Dario Marianelli
- Production companies: Relativity Media; StudioCanal; Working Title Films
- Distributed by: StudioCanal (France); Universal Pictures (international); Focus Features (United States)
- Release dates: 29 August 2007 (Venice); 7 September 2007 (United Kingdom); 14 December 2007 (United States); 9 January 2008 (France)
- Running time: 123 minutes
- Countries: United Kingdom; United States; France
- Language: English
- Budget: $30 million
- Box office: $131 million

Atonement is a 2007 romantic war tragedy film directed by Joe Wright and starring James McAvoy, Keira Knightley, Saoirse Ronan, Romola Garai, and Vanessa Redgrave. It is based on the 2001 novel by Ian McEwan. The film chronicles a crime and its consequences over six decades, beginning in the 1930s. It was produced for StudioCanal and filmed in England. Distributed in most of the world by Universal Studios, it was released theatrically in the United Kingdom on 7 September 2007 and in North America exactly three months later on 7 December 2007.

Atonement opened both the 2007 Vancouver International Film Festival and the 64th Venice International Film Festival. Wright, at age 35, was the youngest director ever to open the Venice event. The film was a commercial success and earned a worldwide gross of approximately $129 million against a budget of $30 million. Critics praised its acting, Wright's direction, Hampton's screenplay, Marianelli's score, emotional depth, the cinematography, editing, visuals, and the film's incorporation of historic events.

Among numerous accolades, Atonement won Best Original Score at the 80th Academy Awards and was nominated in six other categories including Best Picture, Best Supporting Actress (for Ronan), Best Adapted Screenplay. It also garnered fourteen nominations at the 61st British Academy Film Awards, winning both Best Film and Production Design; and won the Golden Globe Award for Best Motion Picture – Drama.

== Plot ==
In 1935 England, 13-year-old Briony Tallis, the youngest daughter of the wealthy Tallis family, spies on her older sister, Cecilia, and the housekeeper's son, Robbie Turner, from a window. Cecilia and Robbie argue by the garden fountain, during which Robbie accidentally breaks a vase. Cecilia removes her dress and climbs into the fountain to retrieve one of the broken pieces. Briony, infatuated with Robbie, observes from nearby and misinterprets the relationship between them.

Robbie writes Cecilia a note in apology. In one draft, he graphically describes his attraction to her, and unintentionally places this draft in the envelope, which he has Briony deliver to Cecilia. She reads it before giving it to her sister and is shocked by the content. Later, Briony describes the note to her 15-year-old cousin Lola, evacuated to their estate with her brothers, who calls Robbie a "sex maniac". Meanwhile, Paul Marshall, a visiting friend of Briony and Cecilia's older brother Leon, introduces himself to their visiting cousins, including Lola.

Before dinner, Robbie apologises to Cecilia for the obscene letter, but she confesses her love for him. They secretly have sex in the library, which Briony witnesses, causing her to mistakenly think her sister is being raped. During dinner, Lola's twin brothers go missing, and the household organises search parties around the grounds. In the dark, Briony comes across Lola being raped by a man who flees. Despite not seeing him clearly, Briony insists it was Robbie; a confused and traumatised Lola does not dissent. After locating the twins, Robbie is arrested for the rape despite Cecilia's pleas of his innocence. Lola and Briony's testimony, along with her turning over the explicit letter, convinces everyone but Cecilia of his guilt.

Four years later, during the Second World War, Robbie is drafted from prison. Joining the army, he fights in the Battle of France. Separated from his unit, Robbie makes his way on foot to Dunkirk, thinking back to six months earlier when he met Cecilia, now a nurse. Gravely ill from an infected wound and experiencing hallucinations, he awaits evacuation.

In 1940, a now 18-year-old Briony joins Cecilia's old nursing unit at St Thomas' Hospital in London rather than go to the University of Cambridge. She writes to her sister, but Cecilia cannot forgive her for causing Robbie's arrest and conviction. Learning that Paul Marshall is about to marry Lola, Briony attends the wedding, and realises it was he – and not Robbie – who raped Lola. Briony visits Cecilia that June to ask forgiveness and suggests correcting her testimony, but Cecilia scornfully says she would be an "unreliable witness". Briony is surprised to find Robbie staying with her sister while on leave, and apologises for her deceit, but Robbie is enraged that she has not accepted responsibility for her actions. Cecilia calms him down, and he instructs Briony how to get his conviction overturned. Briony agrees. When Cecilia suggests that she implicate a former worker on the Tallis estate instead, Briony objects, but is reminded that Lola is now married and cannot testify against her husband.

Decades later, Briony, an elderly and successful novelist, gives an interview about Atonement. The autobiographical novel, her latest, will be her last book, as she is dying from vascular dementia. She reveals that the portion of the book where Robbie and Cecilia are living together and Briony begs their forgiveness is fictitious. In reality, she was never able to atone for her mistake, and Cecilia and Robbie never reunited; Robbie died of septicaemia from his infected wound at Dunkirk on 1 June 1940, and Cecilia—whom Briony had not actually connected with—drowned four months later during an underground flood in the Balham tube station bombing during the Blitz. She wrote her novel with its happy ending to give the two, in fiction, the happiness they never had on her account. The last scene shows an imagined Cecilia and Robbie together in the house by the sea, which they once intended to visit when they were reunited.

== Cast ==
- James McAvoy as Robbie Turner, the son of the Tallis family housekeeper with a Cambridge education courtesy of his mother's employer.
- Keira Knightley as Cecilia Tallis, the elder of the two Tallis sisters.
- Saoirse Ronan as Briony Tallis, aged 13, the younger Tallis sister and an aspiring novelist.
  - Romola Garai as Briony, aged 18, now a nurse-in-training.
  - Vanessa Redgrave as older Briony, now a successful novelist.
- Brenda Blethyn as Grace Turner, Robbie's mother and the Tallis family housekeeper.
- Juno Temple as Lola Quincey, the visiting 15-year-old cousin of the Tallis siblings.
- Benedict Cumberbatch as Paul Marshall, Leon Tallis's visiting friend.
- Patrick Kennedy as Leon Tallis, the eldest of the Tallis siblings.
- Harriet Walter as Emily Tallis, the matriarch of the family.
- Peter Wight as Police Inspector.
- Daniel Mays as Tommy Nettle, one of Robbie's brothers-in-arms.
- Nonso Anozie as Frank Mace, another fellow soldier.
- Gina McKee as Sister Drummond.
- Jérémie Renier as Luc Cornet, a fatally wounded French soldier whom the 18-year-old Briony comforts on his deathbed.
- Michelle Duncan as Fiona Maguire, Briony's nursing friend at St Thomas' Hospital.
- Alfie Allen as Danny Hardman, a worker on the Tallis estate.

In addition, film director and playwright Anthony Minghella briefly appears as the television interviewer in the final scene. Minghella died six months after the film was released, aged 54, following cancer surgery.

== Production ==
=== Pre-production ===
Director Joe Wright asked executive producers, Debra Hayward, Liza Chasin, and co-producer Jane Frazer to collaborate a second time, after working on Pride and Prejudice in 2005. He also sought out production designer Sarah Greenwood, editor Paul Tothill, costume designer Jacqueline Durran, and composer Dario Marianelli, for the film—all of whom previously worked together with Wright. In an interview, Wright states, "It's important for me to work with the same people. It makes me feel safe, and we kind of understand each other." The screenplay was adapted from Ian McEwan's 2001 novel by Christopher Hampton.

After reading McEwan's book, screenwriter Christopher Hampton, who had previously undertaken many adaptations, was inspired to adapt it into a script for a feature film. When Wright took over the project as director, he decided he wanted a different approach, and Hampton re-wrote much of his original script to Wright's suggestion. The first draft – written with the director Richard Eyre in mind – took what Hampton called a more "conventional, literary approach", with a linear structure, and a voiceover and the epilogue of the older Briony being woven in throughout the entire film instead of only at the end. Wright felt that the original approach owed more to contemporary filmmaking than historical filmmaking, while the second script was closer to the book.

To re-create the World War II setting, producers hired a historian to work with the department heads. Background research included the examination of paintings, photographs, and films, and the study of archives. The war scenes, as well as many others scenes, were filmed on location. Set decorator Katie Spencer and production designer Sarah Greenwood both examined archives from Country Life to find suitable locations for the interior and exterior scenes. Seamus McGarvey, the cinematographer, worked closely with Wright on the aesthetics of the visualisation, using a range of techniques and camera movements.

=== Casting ===
Casting the film was a lengthy process for Wright, particularly choosing the right actors for his protagonists. Having previously worked with Keira Knightley on Pride & Prejudice (2005), he expressed his admiration for her, stating, "I think she's a really extraordinary actress". Referencing her character's unlikeability, Wright commented on Knightley's bravery in tackling this type of role without any fear of how the audience will receive this characterisation, stating "It's a character that's not always likeable and I think so many young actors these days are terrified of being disliked at any given moment in case the audience doesn't come and pay their box-office money to see them again. Keira is not afraid of that. She puts her craft first." As opposed to casting McAvoy, "Knightley was in almost the opposite position—that of a sexy, beautiful movie star who, despite having worked steadily since she was seven, was widely underestimated as an actress." In preparation for her role, Knightley watched films from the 1930s and 1940s, such as Brief Encounter and In Which We Serve, to study the "naturalism" of the performance that Wright wanted in Atonement.

James McAvoy, despite turning down previous offers to work with Wright, nonetheless remained the director's first choice. Wright was immediately impressed after first seeing McAvoy in a performance at the Hampstead Theatre, commenting that "he was just stunning. You could certainly see the seeds of what he'd eventually achieve...He's a damn good actor, which is the main reason I cast him." Producers met several actors for the role of Robbie, but McAvoy was the only one who was offered the part. He fitted Wright's bid for someone who "had the acting ability to take the audience with him on his personal and physical journey." McAvoy describes Robbie as one of the most difficult characters he has ever played, "because he's very straight-ahead." Further describing his casting process, Wright commented how "there is something undeniably charming about McAvoy". One of the most important qualities that particularly resonated with Wright was "McAvoy's own working-class roots," which McAvoy noted was something that Wright was very much interested in. Once Wright put both Knightley and McAvoy together, their "palpable sexual chemistry" immediately became apparent. The biggest risk Wright took in casting McAvoy was that "The real question was whether the five-foot-seven, slightly built, ghostly pale Scotsman had what it takes to be a true screen idol."

Casting the role of Briony Tallis also proved challenging, yet once Wright discovered Saoirse Ronan her involvement enabled Wright to finally commence filming. On the casting process for the role of Briony, Wright commented how "We met many, many kids for that role. Then we were sent this tape of this little girl speaking in this perfect 1920s English accent. Immediately, she had this kind of intensity, dynamism, and willfulness." After inviting Ronan to come to London to read for the part, Wright was not only surprised by her Irish accent, but immediately recognised her unique acting ability. Upon casting Ronan, Wright revealed how completing this final casting decision enabled "the film to be what it became" and considered her participation in the film "lucky."

Abbie Cornish was pegged for the role of 18-year-old Briony, but had to back out due to scheduling conflicts with Elizabeth: The Golden Age. Romola Garai was cast instead, and was obliged to adapt her performance's physicality to fit the appearance that had already been decided upon for Ronan and Redgrave. Garai spent much time with Ronan and watched footage of her to approximate the way the younger actress moved. Vanessa Redgrave became everyone's ideal to play the elderly Briony and was the first approached (although she was not cast until Ronan had been found), and committed herself to the role after just one meeting with Wright. Redgrave, Ronan, and Garai worked together with a voice coach to keep the character's timbre in a familiar range throughout the film.

=== Filming ===
Produced by StudioCanal, Atonement was filmed in Great Britain during the summer of 2006.

Due to restrictions in the filming schedule, the production only had two full days to film all the war scenes set on Dunkirk beach and lacked the budget to fund the 1000+ extras needed to shoot these scenes. Joe Wright and cinematographer Seamus McGarvey were forced to reduce the shooting to a 5 1/2-minute-long take following James McAvoy's character as he moved a quarter of a mile along the beach.

The first of the two days, and part of the second day, were dedicated to blocking and rehearsing the sequence until the sun was in the correct position in the afternoon ready to shoot. The shot took three complete takes, the fourth being abandoned mid-flow due to the lighting becoming too bad for shooting. They ended up using the third take. The sequence was accomplished by Steadicam operator Peter Robertson moving between using a tracking vehicle, to being on foot, to using a rickshaw via a ramp, and then back to on foot.

The film includes a short clip from Le Quai des brumes, a 1938 film by Marcel Carné.

=== Locations ===
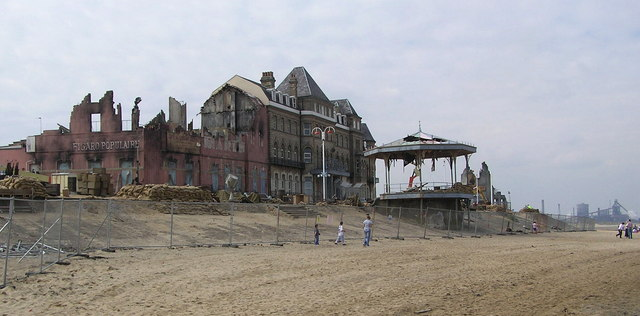
Original film set, August 2006; Redcar's beach was the site of the Dunkirk beach sequence and stood in for Bray-Dunes

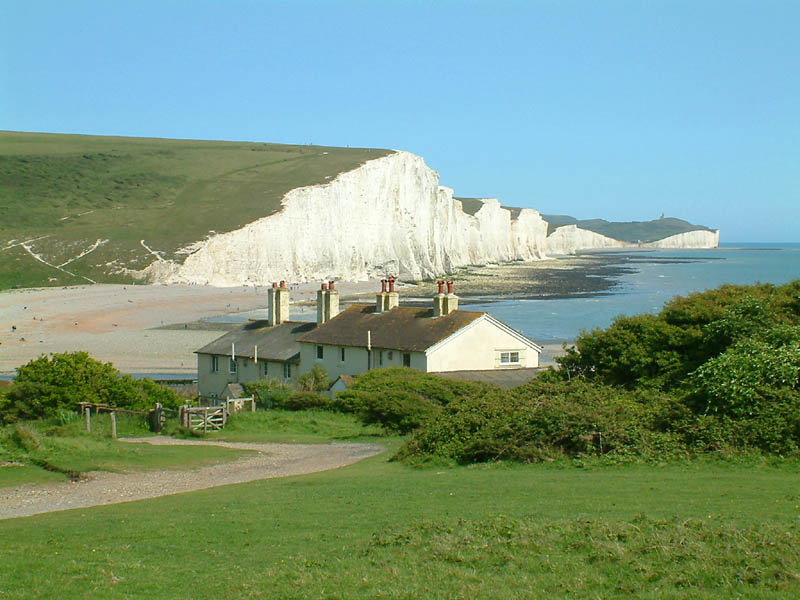
Seven Sisters cliffs and the coastguard cottages, South Downs National Park

Shooting locations for Atonement were primarily:

- Stokesay Court, Onibury, Shropshire.
- The seafront in Redcar. This work included an acclaimed five-minute tracking shot of the seafront as a war-torn Dunkirk and a scene in the local cinema on the promenade.
- The Grimsby ice factory on Grimsby Docks, both the interior and exterior of the building, were locations used for the Dunkirk street scenes.
- Streatham Hill, London, which stood in for neighbouring Balham, Cecilia's new home after breaking up with her family.

Additional locations used in London were Great Scotland Yard and Bethnal Green Town Hall, the latter being used for a 1939 tea-house scene, as well as the church of St John's, Smith Square, Westminster for Lola's wedding. Re-enactment of the 1940 Balham station disaster took place in the former Piccadilly line station of Aldwych, which has been closed since the 1990s.

The war scenes in the French countryside were filmed in Coates, Cambridgeshire and Gedney Drove End, Lincolnshire; Walpole St Andrew and Denver, Norfolk; and in Manea and Pymoor, Cambridgeshire.

Much of the St Thomas's Hospital ward interior scenes were filmed at Park Place, Berkshire and the exterior scenes were filmed at University College London.

All the exteriors and interiors of the Tallis family home were filmed at Stokesay Court, which was selected from an old Country Life edition to tie in with the period and pool fountain of the novel. This mansion was built in 1889, commissioned by the glove manufacturer John Derby Allcroft. It remains an undivided private home.

The third portion of Atonement was entirely filmed at the BBC Television Centre in London. The beach with cliffs first shown on the postcard and later seen towards the end of the film was Cuckmere Haven Seven Sisters, Sussex, which is 14 miles (22 km) from Roedean School, which Cecilia was said to have attended.

=== Music ===
The soundtrack was composed by Dario Marianelli and played by the English Chamber Orchestra with pianist Jean-Yves Thibaudet and cellist Caroline Dale. This was the second collaboration between Marianelli and Wright after Pride and Prejudice in 2005. Marianelli won an Oscar and a Golden Globe for best film music. The music was nominated for other awards including the BAFTAs. The sound of a manual typewriter is also prominent on the soundtrack, as are songs sung by soldiers (such as "Dear Lord and Father of Mankind" by a choir in a pagoda at the beach). The love duet from Act 1 of La bohème, "Miss You" sung by Flanagan and Allen, and Clair de Lune (played by Gordon Fergus-Thompson) also feature.

== Release ==
=== Theatrical ===
Atonement opened at the 2007 Venice International Film Festival, making Wright—at the age of 35—the youngest director ever to be so honoured. The film also opened at the 2007 Vancouver International Film Festival. Atonement was released in the United Kingdom and Ireland on 7 September 2007, and in North America on 7 December 2007, along with a worldwide theatrical distribution which was managed by Universal Pictures, with minor releases through other divisions on 7 September 2007.

=== Home media ===
Atonement was released on DVD in the United States on 3 January 2008, which was followed by a release in Blu-ray edition on 13 March 2012. In the UK, the film was released on DVD on 4 February 2008, on Amazon (in the UK), and on Blu-ray on 27 May 2008.

== Reception ==
=== Box office ===
Atonement grossed $784,145 in the US on its opening weekend (7–9 December 2007). The estimated budget for the film was $30,000,000. The film's cumulative total gross revenue is $129,266,061 (worldwide, 1 February 2009) as part of which it is $50,927,067 in the US.

=== Critical response ===
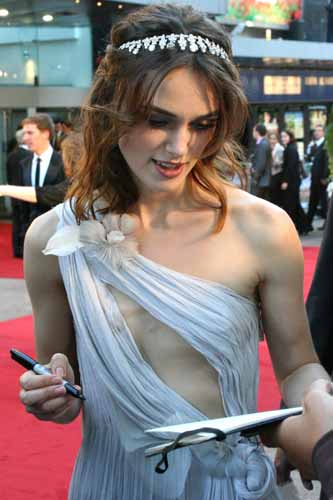
Keira Knightley at the premiere of Atonement in Leicester Square, London

The review site Rotten Tomatoes records that 83% of 217 critics gave Atonement positive reviews. The consensus reads, "Atonement features strong performances, brilliant cinematography, and a unique score. Featuring deft performances from James McAvoy and Keira Knightley, it's a successful adaptation of Ian McEwan's novel." On Metacritic the film holds an average score of 85 out of 100 based on 36 reviews, indicating "universal acclaim".

In the UK, the film was listed as number three on Empire's Top 25 Films of 2007. The American critic Roger Ebert gave it a four-star review, dubbing it "one of the year's best films, a certain best picture nominee". In the film review television programme, At the Movies with Ebert & Roeper, Richard Roeper gave the film a "thumbs up", adding that Knightley gave "one of her best performances". As for the film, he commented that "Atonement has hints of greatness but it falls just short of Oscar contention." The film was praised by critics, with its casting solidifying Knightley as a leading star in British period dramas while igniting McAvoy's career in leading roles. It also catapulted the trajectory of a young Saoirse Ronan.

The Daily Telegraph's David Gritten describes how "Critics who have seen Atonement have reacted with breathless superlatives, and its showing at Venice and [its] subsequent release will almost certainly catapult Wright into the ranks of world-class film directors." The film received many positive reviews for its adherence to McEwan's novel, with Variety reporting that the film "preserves much of the tome's metaphysical depth and all of its emotional power", and commenting that "Atonement is immensely faithful to McEwan's novel." Author Ian McEwan also worked as an executive producer on the film.

Not all reviews were as favourable. Although The Atlantic's Christopher Orr praises Knightley's performance as "strong" and McAvoy as "likeable and magnetic", he concludes by saying "Atonement is a film out of balance, nimble enough in its first-half but oddly scattered and ungainly once it leaves the grounds of the Tallis estate", and remains "a workmanlike yet vaguely disappointing adaptation of a masterful novel". The New York Times's A. O. Scott comes to a similar conclusion, saying "Mr. McAvoy and Ms. Knightley sigh and swoon credibly enough, but they are stymied by the inertia of the filmmaking, and by the film's failure to find a strong connection between the fates of the characters and the ideas and historical events that swirl around them."

On a more positive note, The New York Observer's Rex Reed considers Atonement his favourite film of the year deeming it "everything a true lover of literature and movies could possibly hope for", and singling out McAvoy stating "the film's star in an honest, heart-rending performance of strength and integrity that overcomes the romantic slush it might have been", and praising Ronan as a "staggeringly assured youngster", while being underwhelmed by a "serenely bland Keira Knightley". Adding to the film's authentic adaptation, David Gritten once again notes how "If Atonement feels like a triumph, it's a totally British one." McAvoy is singled out: "His performance as Robbie Turner, the son of a housekeeper at a country estate, raised with ambitions but appallingly wronged, holds the movie together."

=== Top ten lists ===
The film appeared on many film critics' top ten lists for 2007.

Rank	Critic	Publication
1st	Kenneth Turan	Los Angeles Times
1st	Lou Lumenick	New York Post
2nd	Peter Travers	Rolling Stone
3rd	—N/a	Empire
4th	Ann Hornaday	The Washington Post
4th	Joe Morgenstern	The Wall Street Journal
4th	Richard Corliss	Time
4th	Roger Ebert	Chicago Sun-Times
4th	Tasha Robinson	The A.V. Club
7th	Nathan Rabin	The A.V. Club
8th	James Berardinelli	ReelViews
8th	Keith Phipps	The A.V. Club
8th	Stephen Holden	The New York Times
9th	Marjorie Baumgarten	The Austin Chronicle
10th	Michael Sragow	The Baltimore Sun
10th	Noel Murray	The A.V. Club

=== Accolades ===
Atonement received numerous awards and nominations, including seven Golden Globe nominations—more than any other film nominated at the 65th Golden Globe Awards—and winning two Golden Globes, including Best Motion Picture – Drama. The film also received 14 BAFTA nominations for the 61st British Academy Film Awards including Best Film, Best British Film, and Best Director, seven Academy Award nominations, including Best Picture, and the Evening Standard British Film Award for technical achievement in cinematography, and awards for production design and costume design, earned by Seamus McGarvey, Sarah Greenwood and Jacqueline Durran, respectively. Atonement ranks 442nd on Empire magazine's 2008 list of the 500 greatest movies of all time. In 2025, it was one of the films voted for the "Readers' Choice" edition of The New York Times' list of "The 100 Best Movies of the 21st Century", finishing at number 201.

Atonement has been named among the Top 10 Films of 2007 by the Austin Film Critics Association, the Dallas-Fort Worth Film Critics Association, New York Film Critics Online and the Southeastern Film Critics Association.

=== Cultural impact ===
The green dress Cecilia wears during the love scene in the library garnered considerable interest. At the ten-year anniversary of the film's American premiere, the film's costume designer Jacqueline Durran called it "unforgettable".

=== Historical inaccuracies ===
The film shows an Avro Lancaster bomber flying overhead in 1935, an aircraft which did not have its first flight until 1941.

During the scene in 1935 in which Robbie writes and discards letters for Cecilia, he keeps playing a record of the love duet from Act 1 of La bohème, with Victoria de los Ángeles and Jussi Björling singing, which was not recorded until 1956.

In the scene on the Dunkirk beach, Robbie is told that the Lancastria has been sunk, an event that actually happened two weeks after the Dunkirk evacuations.

The song "White Cliffs of Dover" was not penned until 1941.

A detail reported as a historical inaccuracy is the date of the Balham tube station disaster. It happened before midnight on 14 October 1940. Old Briony mentions 15 October as the date, which would have been the day the news of the deadly flooding broke.

Many details in the long sequences set at Dunkirk, especially the Ferris wheel by the beach with soldiers going round on the wheel, and the events in the beachside cinema, are hallucinations in the mind of the man dying from his infected wounds. Historically the beaches used during the Dunkirk evacuation were empty sand dunes (the place-name means church in the dune) near the bombed jetty.

== See also ==
- Green dress of Keira Knightley
