= Darren Walsh (director) =

British animation director

- Born: 26 March 1969 (age 57); Frimley, Surrey, England
- Occupations: Director; writer; actor
- Years active: 1990s–present
- Notable work: Angry Kid

Darren Walsh (born 26 March 1969) is a British director, writer, animator and voice artist. He uses stop-frame animation, live-action, and CG in his work. He lives in London and is represented by production company Passion Pictures, having worked previously independently and for Aardman Animations.

== Career ==
Walsh trained in animation at West Surrey College of Art and Design (now the University for the Creative Arts), where his graduation film "Oozat" (1993), using pixelation and mask animation, was broadcast on Channel 4 and won awards at the Cork International Film Festival and the Hiroshima Animation Festival.

In 1994, Walsh directed a short film called "The Biz", which is currently partially found.

He devised, directed, and voiced the four series of Angry Kid animated short films, which were commissioned by the BBC, produced at Aardman Animations, and won awards including Best Animated Short at the World Comedy Short Film Festival, Toronto in February 2003. In 2001 and 2002, Walsh directed two adverts for Tennent's lager, which won the British Animation Awards in 2002. Walsh devised and directed Who Do I Think I Am? and also directed commercials, title sequences, and broadcast idents for BBC Television and Channel 4 before moving to London and joining Passion Pictures in 2003.

At Passion Pictures Walsh directed campaigns for Sony Bravia "Play-Doh" (with Frank Budgen at Gorgeous Enterprises), Compare the Market, Peperami, Specsavers, BBC iPlayer, Duracell and National Express Trains.

Walsh's animation direction on Sony Bravia "Play-Doh", where hundreds of plasticine rabbits take over Manhattan, won Best Animation at the 2007 D&AD Awards. The comparethemarket.com campaign, featuring the Russian meerkat character, Aleksandr Orlov, won a silver and three gold awards at the 2010 British Television Advertising Awards. The Orlov character was designed by Walsh and he has directed all of the TV advertisements for the campaign.

In 2008, he directed the film trailer "Flying Penguins" for An April Fools' Day Prank on the BBC. It was filmed to promote the BBC iPlayer.

In total, his commercials have picked up over 50 industry and animation awards since 2006.

In 2011, Walsh animated the clockwork mouse for Hugo, which was nominated for 11 Oscars, and he was also awarded an honorary MA from University of the Creative Arts, Farnham.

In 2011, Walsh was awarded an honorary degree from the University for the Creative Arts.

His most recent work includes being Animation Director on the first part of His Dark Materials, the adaptation of Philip Pullman's trilogy for TV.

== Personal life ==
Walsh lives in Bray, Ireland and has two children.
