= Plum Vera Wang dress of Keira Knightley =

- Designer: Vera Wang
- Year: 2006
- Type: Plum evening gown with fishtail skirt
- Material: Taffeta

British actor Keira Knightley wore a plum Vera Wang evening gown to the 78th Academy Awards on March 5, 2006. The full-length taffeta dress had a single shoulder strap and fishtail skirt. It was accessorised with a Bulgari necklace.

In a subsequent poll by British retail chain Debenhams published in The Daily Telegraph, the dress was voted the 6th greatest red carpet gown of all time. Cosmopolitan magazine also cited it as one of the Best Oscar dresses of all time, saying Knightley looked: "super-graceful in this eggplant taffeta gown custom-made by Vera Wang."

== See also ==
- List of individual dresses
- Green dress of Keira Knightley
