= Green dress of Keira Knightley =

Dress featured in the 2007 film Atonement

- Designer: Jacqueline Durran
- Year: 2007
- Type: Backless green dress
- Material: Silk

Keira Knightley wore a green dress in the 2007 romantic war drama film Atonement. The garment was created by costume designer Jacqueline Durran with director Joe Wright, and is worn during the opening act's climactic scene. The dress, combining period and modern elements, was praised by media publications upon Atonement's release, and is regarded as a standout in film fashion.

== Background and design ==
Atonement (2007), a film adaptation of Ian McEwan's novel, centres around the impact of World War II on one woman's life and journey. Costume designer Jacqueline Durran was asked by Wright to make a memorable dress suitable for a pivotal scene within the film. Wright had opined that the final piece should be green and full-skirted with movement at the hem. He also advised Durran that it should highlight the scene's setting of the hottest day of the year". Durran reviewed fashion books from the 1920s and 30s, including the designs of Coco Chanel, picking elements that would suit Knightley's figure. She designed the piece in 2006, in a fine fabric to be "light and unstructured". The silk was bought in white and dyed into a composite green, picked by Wright from Durran's selection of three pigments. Durran modernized certain period trends, including a bare back and shoulders, to reflect more contemporary styling of "unadorned, bold-coloured gowns".

The dress is an emerald-green, lush, low-cut gown with a flapper drop back and thin straps alongside a drape wrapped around the upper-hip, a central slit, and a Grecian, full-skirted silhouette. As Durran herself stated, the dress could not be considered fully authentic since it contains elements of London fashion not often seen co-existing in a single piece. These include details like “the backlessness and the fullness of the skirt”.

In Atonement, Knightley portrays Cecilia, a woman of high standing who falls in love with Robbie, the housekeeper's son, portrayed by James McAvoy. The dress is worn by Cecilia during the climax of the first part of the film, where Cecilia and Robbie make love in the library, and was noted to fit into the character's aristocratic style. Throughout the film, fashion traces the character's journey from "silken-gowned debutante to a sullied-cotton disgraced woman". The dress was noted to fit into Wright's "visual template" under the quickening pace from the side-shot of Cecilia lighting cigarettes in the garden, before her bare skin exposed through the dress captures Robbie's attention, evolving into a scene in the library. The sequence's shots largely include full-length lighting and framing of the dress, which Durran noted "[sold the piece] to its best advantage". The dress's colouring was consistent with a green motif within the film, found the setting of the manorial house and the English countryside.

== Reception and legacy ==
Following the film's release, the green dress received widespread press attention and acclaim. As a result of her work in the film, Durran was nominated for the Academy Award for Best Costume Design in 2007. That same year, a Sky Cinema/InStyle poll voted the dress as "greatest film costume ever"; a decade after its release, it was "still regarded as one of the all-time greats". Replicas of the dress have sold for substantial amounts of money, with one retailing for over $30,000. Versions of the dress made for filming were later sold for tens of thousands of dollars, with proceeds going to charity. The dress's shade of green was a rarity among popular film costumes. British Vogue listed the ensemble as one of the most unforgettable green dresses in film.

Vogue Paris stated the outfit became a "cult hit" that made an affordable deviation from period fashion. David Canfield of Entertainment Weekly wrote that the "unforgettable" piece had "a mystique around it — fitting for a movie steeped in the summer haze of memory, and shrouded in delectable ambiguity". Writing for The Guardian, Emanuele Lugli described the buzz surrounding the costume as "entirely justified", stating that it "exudes poise, mystery, and menace" and "controls the screen in a way few other outfits have done". Refinery29 dubbed Knightley's look "a gleaming example of eccentric English style that remains cool as a cucumber-sandwich throughout". Moira Macdonald from the Seattle Times labelled the dress "one of the most beautiful movie costumes of recent decades" with "a slippery, almost watery gown that seems to float over its wearer". Stylist framed the dress as an audience highlight, praising its "slinky, bold, and elegant" design.

When asked for an opinion on the dress’s “surprise” success, Durran attributed its significance to a "perfect storm" of Wright's filming, Knightley's performance, and Seamus McGarvey’s cinematography. By keeping Knightley well lit and in full frame, the audience could feel the full effect of the dress’s glamorous allure. Despite the overwhelming enthusiasm for the green dress, Wright prefers Briony’s cream organza frock (as worn in the movie by Saoirse Ronan).

Designer Nensi Dojaka, known for her "tailored lingerie" aesthetic, was inspired to create a similar gown for model Alexa Chung. However the recreation is a far cry from the original, opting for visible straps and bold cut-outs in lieu of the 1930s inspired bias cut. Dojaka did not reveal how she managed to get the satin fabric a particular shade of green.

== See also ==
- List of individual dresses
- Plum Vera Wang dress of Keira Knightley
