= Deborah Curtis =

British writer and widow of Ian Curtis (born 1956)

- Born: Deborah Woodruff; 13 December 1956 (age 69); Liverpool
- Occupation: Writer
- Spouse: Ian Curtis (m. 1975; died 1980)

Deborah Curtis (née Woodruff; born 13 December 1956) is a British writer who is the widow of Joy Division singer Ian Curtis, who died by suicide in 1980.

She met Ian Curtis at school. They married on 23 August 1975, at St Thomas' Church in Macclesfield. In 1995, she wrote Touching from a Distance, a detailed biographical novel about the life of Ian Curtis, from his teenage years until his untimely death.

Deborah Curtis is co-producer of the film adaptation of this novel, Control, directed by Anton Corbijn and released in 2007. In this film, she is played by Samantha Morton.

== Bibliography ==
- Touching from a Distance (1995)
