= Touching from a Distance =

1995 biography by Deborah Curtis

Touching From a Distance
- First edition
- Author: Deborah Curtis
- Language: English
- Genre: Biography
- Publisher: Faber and Faber
- Publication date: 1995
- Publication place: United Kingdom
- Media type: Print (Paperback)
- Pages: 208 pp
- ISBN: 0-57117445-0

Touching from a Distance is a biography written by Deborah Curtis. It details her life and marriage with Ian Curtis, lead singer of the 1970s British post-punk band Joy Division. In the book, Deborah Curtis speaks of Ian's infidelity, their troubled marriage, Ian's volatile and sometimes troubled personality, and his health problems (which included epileptic seizures and depression) that likely led to his suicide in 1980, on the eve of Joy Division's first United States tour. The foreword was written by the music journalist Jon Savage.

The title is a reference to a line in one of Joy Division's most popular songs, "Transmission". The appendix contains four sections: Discography, Lyrics, Unseen Lyrics, and Gig List. The Unseen Lyrics section contains songs that either were not recorded or finished.

== Adaptation ==
The book has been used as a reference for Anton Corbijn's film Control (2007), for which Deborah Curtis was a co-producer. The role of Deborah was played by Samantha Morton.
