= Orian Williams =

American producer

Alfred Orian Williams
- Born: November 11, 1965 (age 61); Jackson, Mississippi, US
- Occupation: Producer
- Years active: 2000–present

Alfred Orian Williams (born 11 November 1965) is an American film producer. Williams is best known for the Willem Dafoe/John Malkovich film Shadow of the Vampire, as well as the BIFA-winning Control, an Ian Curtis biopic which also received multiple Cannes and BAFTA awards.

== Partial filmography ==
Year	Film	Credit
2000	Shadow of the Vampire	Associate Producer
2005	Tennis, Anyone...?	Producer
2007	Control	Producer
2008	One Fast Move or I'm Gone: Kerouac's Big Sur	Co-producer
2013	Big Sur	Producer
2013	Taken by Storm: The Art of Storm Thorgerson and Hipgnosis	Producer
2014	Warren	Producer
2014	Asthma	Co-producer
2014	Me	Producer
2016	My Father Die	Producer
2017	The Last Movie Star	Executive Producer
2017	England Is Mine	Producer
2018	Curtiz	Executive Producer
2019	Yellow Rose	Producer
2020	Dreamkatcher	Producer
2020	Wonderwell	Producer
2022	Roving Woman	Executive Producer
2023	Sam & Kate	Producer
