= The Pearce Sisters =

- Directed by: Luis Cook
- Story by: Luis Cook (adaptation)
- Based on: the short story by Kirkham Jackson
- Produced by: Jo Allen
- Edited by: Dan Williamson
- Production company: Aardman Animations
- Release date: 11 June 2007 (Annecy Film Festival)
- Running time: 9 min 16 sec
- Country: United Kingdom
- Language: English

The Pearce Sisters is a 2007 short film created by Aardman Animations.

== Plot ==
Two peculiar sisters live in a house on a windy beach. Their livelihood revolves around fishing, butchering their catch and then smoking it. One day, the big sister sees a man drowning out to sea. They save him from the waves, and shave and dress him while he's unconscious. He wakes up terrified and runs away naked. Later, they find his body on the sand. His face has been disfigured. The sisters butcher and smoke his corpse, like they do with the fish, and add him to a tea party scene they have populated with other dead and smoked bodies.

== Cast ==
- Len Gray
- Dan Williamson

== Critical reception ==
Sundance Film Festival review- Cook used computers and hand-drawn animation to tell a somber story in contrast to the cheerful, claymation style of animation that Aardman Animations is known for. He wanted very minimal music and no dialogue to complement the story's austerity. Sound was added in advance of animation, serving as a foundation for the editing. The computer generated animated faces for expressionless characters. After then, the animation was printed out. Each frame's 2D features and emotions were manually sketched in a rough, scratchy way, scanned back into the computer, and then utilized as an overlay for the 3D animation. Generally, colors appeared to have been bleached by the sea.

IMDb review- "Nasty....just nasty...and not in a good way" 5/10 stars

IMDb review- "Grotesque and macabre but somewhat endearing" 8/10 stars

== Awards and nominations ==
This is a list of awards and nominations of The Pearce Sisters.

Year	Nominee / work	Award	Result
2007	Luis Cook (Tied with Juan Pablo Zaramella for Lapsus)	ANIMA - Córdoba International Animation Festival Best Animation award for Animated Stories	Won
2007	Luis Cook	Annecy International Animated Film Festival Special Jury Award for Short Films	Won
2007	Luis Cook	Annecy International Animated Film Festival The Annecy Cristal award	Nominated
2007	Luis Cook	Europe Cartoon Forum Cartoon d'Or	Won
2007	Luis Cook	Cinanima Grand Prize	Won
2007	Luis Cook	Krok International Animated Films Festival Grand Prix	Won
2007	Luis Cook	Sitges - Catalan International Film Festival award for Best Animated Short Film	Won
2007	Luis Cook	Tallinn Black Nights Film Festival Animated Dreams Special Mention	Won
2008	Jo Allen and Luis Cook	BAFTA Film Award for Best Short Animation	Won
2008	Luis Cook	Clermont-Ferrand International Short Film Festival award for Best Animation	Won
2008	Luis Cook (Prix UIP Tampere)	European Film Awards Best Short Film Award	Nominated
2008	Luis Cook	Tampere International Short Film Festival Prix UIP Tampere (European Short Film)	Won
2008	Luis Cook	Grand Prix at World Festival of Animated Film Animafest Zagreb	Won
