= Commencement (album) =

Studio album by Deadsy
- Released: May 14, 2002
- Recorded: 1996–2001
- Studio: Nordic Estates, B.C.; Westlake Audio; N.R.G; The Enterprise; Scream; Josh's Garage; Cher's house; A&M; Dreamland
- Genre: Electronic rock; gothic rock; new wave; nu metal
- Length: 68:20
- Label: DreamWorks; Elementree
- Producer: Josh Abraham; Elijah Blue; Jay Baumgardner

Deadsy chronology
Deadsy (1997)	Commencement (2002)	Phantasmagore (2006)

Singles from Commencement
- 1. "The Key to Gramercy Park" Released: April 9, 2002; 2. "Brand New Love" Released: October 2002

Commencement is the second studio album by American rock band Deadsy, released on May 14, 2002. Initially suspended upon distribution changes at Sire, it was officially released through DreamWorks under the Elementree sublabel. It includes the single "The Key to Gramercy Park" which had a music video. Featuring guest musicians and industry figures such as Jonathan Davis, it was a commercial disappointment, selling 100,000 copies by 2006.

== Background ==
Intended as an improved edition of Deadsy's first album, Commencement was originally anticipated for a fall 1999 release under Sire Records. The nearly completed record was left in limbo when Sire's distribution deal with Warner Bros. dissolved. Deadsy was soon dropped from the label and given the option of releasing their album underdeveloped or taking the songs elsewhere. During this time, Carlton Bost was added on Ztar and guitar, and "Creature" Ashburn Miller replaced "The Beast" Craig Riker on bass in January 2002. With the support of Korn's Jonathan Davis, the group signed to Elementree two months after their dismissal from Sire. They would soon begin re-recording and retooling some of the tracks for its official release with co-producers Jay Baumgardner and Josh Abraham. Tracks dating back to Deadsy's 1996 effort were included, and entirely new songs were recorded, such as the lead single, "The Key to Gramercy Park". A promotional music video for "She Likes Big Words" was edited from a December 8, 2000 concert, and released in February 2001. MTV reported in July 2001 that Davis had recorded vocals for the aforementioned track at A&M Studios. This would be his second collaboration with the group.

Vocalist Elijah Blue described the situation regarding the delay of Commencement in 2002:

"There were a lot of delicate situations going on politically when we were at Sire/Warner Brothers—basically, Deadsy was something so outside of what was going on in music, that they weren't about to take a chance. I think ultimately they just didn't believe in it and wouldn't release it. I mean they signed someone they didn't believe in and were just so busy trying to figure out what the next band that was going to last for two seconds was."

== Music ==
Blue has cited Gary Numan, Type O Negative, and Black Sabbath as the album's influences. While containing obvious electronic elements of the '80s, such as shrill synthesizer melodies and generously reverberated percussion, the album also features deep, purring guitar distortion and clean, goth-like vocals. Commencement features two cover songs: "Brand New Love" written by Lou Barlow of the band Sebadoh and "Tom Sawyer" by Rush. It also boasts guest appearances by Jonathan Davis (Korn), Troy Van Leeuwen (Failure, A Perfect Circle, Queens of the Stone Age), Jay Gordon (Orgy), and John Taylor (Duran Duran).

Blue noted that the long delay "ultimately, for longevity's sake, worked in our favor" and allowed the songs to develop in re-recording. The material on Commencement received praise from Wayne Static of Static-X who compared it to a combination of Type O Negative and Orgy and described the sound as "very melodic, lush, beautiful—yet brutally heavy at the same time." Regarding its electronic-heavy nature, Blue would later describe the album as "more synthetic" compared to Deadsy's 2006 follow-up.

== Artwork ==
Commencement's album art was designed and directed by Josh Gabbard. Its cover is a simple illustration of the Hyde Mansion at Allman and Hawkey's alma mater, the Hyde School in Bath, Maine. The mansion is shown behind a fountain of skulls, based on the school's Sunken Garden, which is depicted in stark, relatively flat colors. The backside features all five band members standing over a world map, simply illustrated with blank white eyes and their signature color schemes. The disc itself and the liner notes feature a white chain link pattern used throughout the promotion of Commencement. Each member is represented in the liner notes by a signature color (red, blue, yellow, green, and gray), stage name, and graphic.

=== Variations ===
There are five known variations. The most popular depicts blue water and a grey podium with a blue bone symbol. The second is nearly identical to the first, except the symbol is white. The third, labeled "advance copy" under the title, features red water, a blue podium and a grey bone. The fourth (for digital copies) has white water, a grey podium and a white bone. The fifth (Japanese version) is like the first and second, but with brighter blue water.

== Touring and promotion ==
Deadsy opened for Static-X, Stone Temple Pilots, Staind, and Linkin Park on the Family Values Tour in the fall of 2001. The band also opened for Static-X on a few dates of their own tour. During this time, Deadsy's Elijah Blue contributed vocals to "What's Going On (Reality Check Mix)" a collaborative reworking led by Fred Durst. In May, Deadsy performed with Papa Roach and the following month joined Puddle of Mudd for the US leg of Korn's Untouchables Tour. Late in the summer, keyboardist Dr. Nner allegedly broke both wrists but continued touring. The band played with Taproot and Dredg in August.

"The Key to Gramercy Park" was originally released alongside "Mansion World" as a double A-sided single in late 2001. It was then re-released in anticipation of Commencement and to coincide with its music video. The video was directed by Fred Durst of Limp Bizkit at Hayvenhurst Studios in Van Nuys, California and debuted on April 31, 2002. Durst, who became a fan after hearing Deadsy's earlier material, praised the band's willingness to shoot extensively in a cloud of CO_{2}: "I laid down in it for 10 seconds and my throat dried up and I was feeling nauseous. These guys have been in it for three hours... This is their first video and they are seriously taking a beating." The haunting video has each member associated with a specific color and graphic. Frontman Elijah Blue noted that it "has sort of a remedial context to its visuals. It kind of explains a little bit about the band." Blue also described the song as "kind of the Trojan horse of the record... We feel like this is simply a good rock jam. It's very impressionistic. It's very powerful and simply in your face." The song did not manage to chart.

A cover of Sebadoh's "Brand New Love" would serve as a follow-up single in October 2002. It, too, had a music video released in November which contained concert footage with brief cameos of numerous tour mates. Like its predecessor, "Brand New Love" would not land on the charts. Deadsy had reportedly wanted to release "Winners" or "Mansion World" as a third single, but this did not occur.

A live performance of "Tom Sawyer" was included on the Family Values Tour 2001 compilation released in May 2002. A remix of the track "Mansion World" by trance music group Deepsky was included on their 2002 album In Silico, titled "The Mansion World (Deepsky's Trippin' in Unknown Territory Mix)."

== Reception ==
=== Critical response ===
Professional ratings
Aggregate scores
Source	Rating
Metacritic	56/100
Review scores
Source	Rating
AllMusic	3/5 stars
Alternative Press	4.5/5 stars
Blender	2/5 stars
Entertainment Weekly	D
Rolling Stone	3/5 stars

Commencement received mixed reviews. Metacritic gives it 56/100 based on five critics. Rolling Stone offered a mediocre response and sarcastically compared the band to a "hilariously high-concept prank." Entertainment Weekly's Jim Farber lamented, "If only they didn't sound like a dying Flock of Seagulls. The fivesome's cheesy '80s new-wave music may explain why it took seven years for a label to release their debut. But at this point, Deadsy sound D.O.A."

One stand-out review of acclamation came from Alternative Press which noted "Deadsy's mix of electronics, death-metal distortion and lugubrious vocals offers something magnificently alien, yet familiar." AllMusic's Robert L. Doerschuk gave a somewhat positive review but emphasized the band's retro influences, stating, "A guest shot by Korn vocalist Jonathan Davis on "The Key to Gramercy Park" reminds listeners of the band's currency, but it's easy to mistake Commencement for an '80s artifact."

In 2018, Commencement was ranked number 21 on Business Insider's list of "37 albums that music critics really hate, but normal people love".

=== Commercial performance ===
Deadsy's association with Korn and Fred Durst and critical tour slots gained them mainstream exposure and significant press attention. Supported by the nu metal flagships, their moment in the spotlight was fleeting. Neither single charted and Commencement did not meet sales expectations. SoundScan reports that it sold 70,000 copies by November 2002. It sold over 100,000 copies by 2006.

== Track listing ==
Commencement track listing
No.	Title	Length
1.	"The Key to Gramercy Park" (featuring Jonathan Davis)	3:12
2.	"Winners"	4:22
3.	"Brand New Love" (featuring Richie Birkenhead)	4:34
4.	"Mansion World" (featuring Troy Van Leeuwen)	5:02
5.	"Lake Waramaug"	4:23
6.	"The Elements"	5:21
7.	"Flowing Glower" (featuring Jay Gordon)	4:58
8.	"Future Years" (featuring Jay Gordon)	5:26
9.	"She Likes Big Words" (featuring John Taylor and Troy Van Leeuwen)	3:59
10.	"Cruella" (featuring Jay Gordon)	5:54
11.	"Seagulls (The Macroprosopus)" (featuring Jay Gordon)	5:56
12.	"Le Cirque En Rose (Obsolescence)"	4:55
13.	"Tom Sawyer"	4:52
14.	"Commencement"	5:16

== Personnel ==
=== Deadsy ===
- Phillips Exeter Blue I – vocals, guitar, bass guitar on "Lake Waramaug" and "The Elements", programming, synthesizers
- Dr. Nner – synthesizers, programming
- Alec Püre – drums and percussion
- Creature – bass guitar (credit only)
- Carlton Megalodon – Ztar on "The Key To Gramercy Park", "Winners", "Brand New Love", "Mansion World", "She Likes Big Words", "Tom Sawyer"

=== Additional personnel ===
- Craig Riker – additional bass guitar
- Jonathan Davis – additional vocals on "The Key to Gramercy Park"
- Jay Gordon – additional vocals on "Seagulls" and bass on "Flowing Glower", "Future Years", and "Cruella"
- John Taylor – additional bass on "She Likes Big Words"
- Troy Van Leeuwen – additional lead guitar on "She Likes Big Words" and "Mansion World"
- Ritchie Birkenhead – additional vocals on "Brand New Love"
- Sunny Levine – additional break beats on "The Key to Gramercy Park"
- Jed Whedon – additional piano on "Winners"
- Chris Vrenna – additional programming
- Jay Baumgardner – producer, mixing
- Josh Gabbard – design/art direction

== Charts ==
Chart performance for Commencement
Chart (2002)	Peak position
US Billboard 200	100
