= Richie Birkenhead =

American singer-songwriter

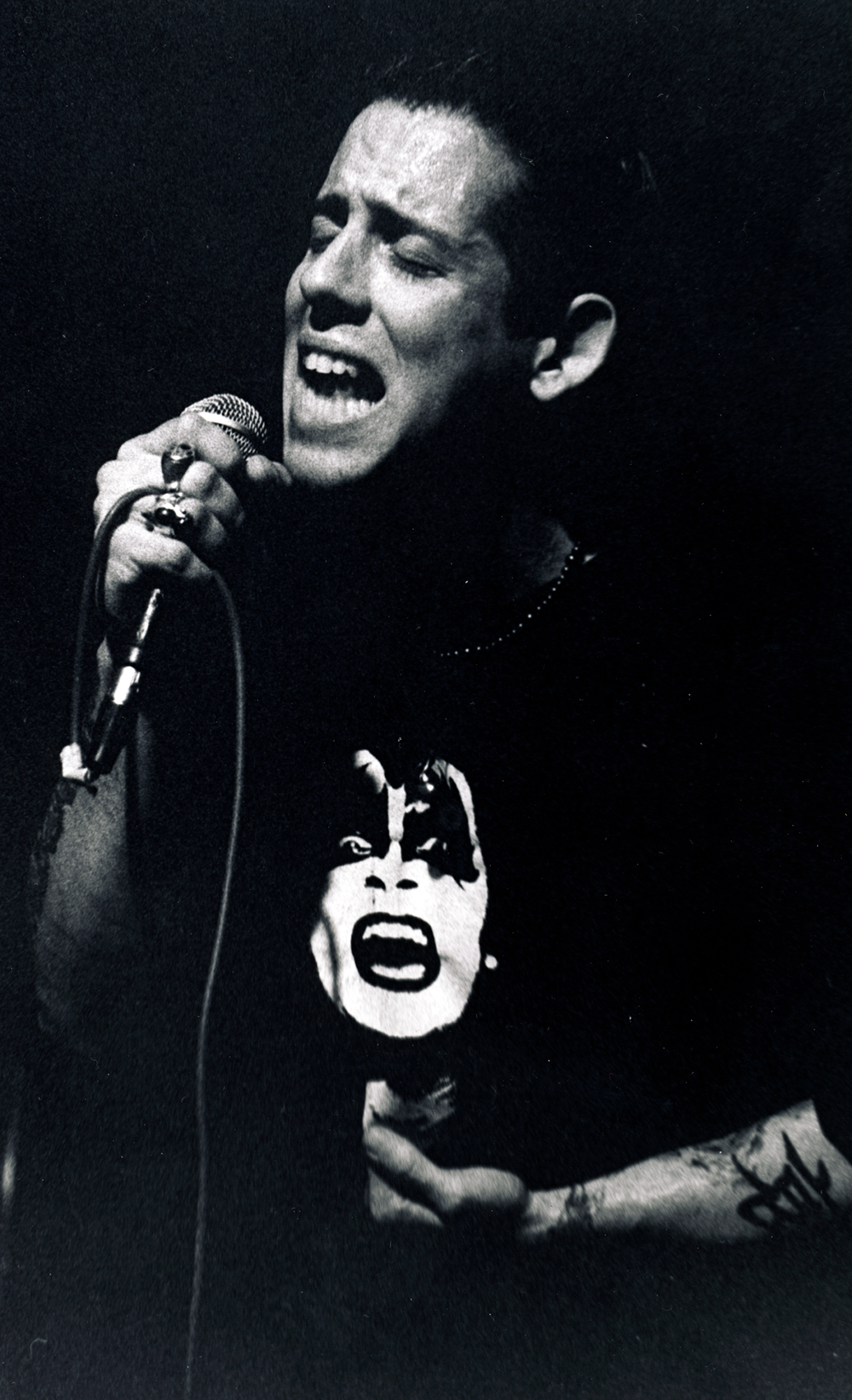
- Richie Birkenhead performing with Into Another in Los Angeles, 1995

Background information
- Born: Richard James Birkenhead; August 23, 1965 (age 60)
- Genres: Rock, post-hardcore, hardcore, punk, dark ambient, alternative rock, Alternative Metal, Experimental rock
- Occupations: Musician, songwriter, producer, Creative Director
- Instruments: Vocals, guitar, piano
- Years active: 1986–present
- Labels: New Beginning Records, Caroline Records, Revelation Records, Hollywood Records
- Website: intoanother.com

Richie Birkenhead (born Richard James Birkenhead; August 23, 1965) is an American rock musician and creative director. He was a singer, songwriter and guitarist of late '80s New York hardcore bands Underdog and Youth of Today, and went on in the 1990s to become vocalist for the American rock band, Into Another.

== Early life ==
In his early teens, while living on the Upper West Side of Manhattan and attending the McBurney School, Birkenhead started a neo-rockabilly band, the Bel-Airs, with members of Buzz and the Flyers and Tav Falco's Panther Burns. Birkenhead was the Bel-Airs' guitarist, songwriter and occasional vocalist. Although they never officially released any recorded material, the band played regularly in many New York venus, including Mudd Club, Peppermint Lounge, Danceteria, The Ritz and CBGB and opened for The Cramps, The Gun Club, The Rockats and Carl Perkins.

== Music career ==
During the mid-to-late '80s, Birkenhead fronted the hardcore bands Numskuls (1983–1985) and Underdog (1985–1989). In 1986 he joined the straight edge hardcore band Youth of Today on guitar. He spent time touring with the band, as well as recording the band's first full-length offering, 1986's Break Down the Walls.

Birkenhead, along with Youth of Today drummer, Drew Thomas, left the band in 1990 to form the band, Into Another, with guitarist Peter Moses and bassist Tony Bono. Into Another released its first self-titled full-length album in 1990 on Revelation Records, followed by two EPs and another full-length before signing with Hollywood Records in 1995. During the band's stint on Hollywood Records, Into Another released "Seemless" in 1996, in which Birkenhead and the band entered the Billboard 200 for the first time with the song "T.A.I.L.", peaking at number 39 on the mainstream rock chart.

Conflict between Birkenhead and Hollywood Records, as well as internal tensions led to the dissolution of Into Another after 1997, leaving an unreleased full-length album entitled "Soul Control".

During the next 15 years, Birkenhead appeared only occasionally at solo acoustic shows.

In June 2012, as part of the Revelation Records 25th Anniversary shows, Into Another was reformed, and, with Richie Birkenhead, Drew Thomas, Peter Moses, Brian Balchack and Reid Black, Into Another made its first appearance in over 15 years. The band has continued to perform, and Richie Birkenhead is again fully active with Into Another and creating new music.

== Discography ==
=== with into Another ===
Title	Release date	Label
self-titled	1990	Revelation Records
Creepy Eepy (EP)	1992	Revelation Records
Poison Fingers (EP)	1994	Revelation Records
Ignaurus	1994	Revelation Records
T.A.I.L. (EP)	1995	Hollywood Records
Seemless	1995	Hollywood Records
Soul Control (Unreleased)	1996	Hollywood Records
Omens (EP)	2015	Ghost Ship Records

=== with Youth of Today ===
Title	Release date	Label
Break Down the Walls	1987	Revelation Records
New York City Hardcore – Together (Compilation)	1987	Revelation Records

=== with Underdog ===
Title	Release date	Label
self-titled	1986	New Beginning Records
The Vanishing Point	1989	Caroline Records
Demos	1993	Revelation Records

=== Collaboration with other artists ===
- Shift – Spacesuit (1995) (as Producer)
- Deadsy – Commencement (1999) (vocals on "Brand New Love")

== Personal life ==
Richie Birkenhead is the son of lyricist Susan Birkenhead. He married Samantha Kluge, style editor of Glamour magazine and daughter of late media mogul John Kluge, in 2000. The marriage ended in divorce in 2002. In 2006, Birkenhead married art dealer Jamie Harman. The couple have two children.

Birkenhead is vegan.
