= Carlton Bost =

American musician (born 1975)

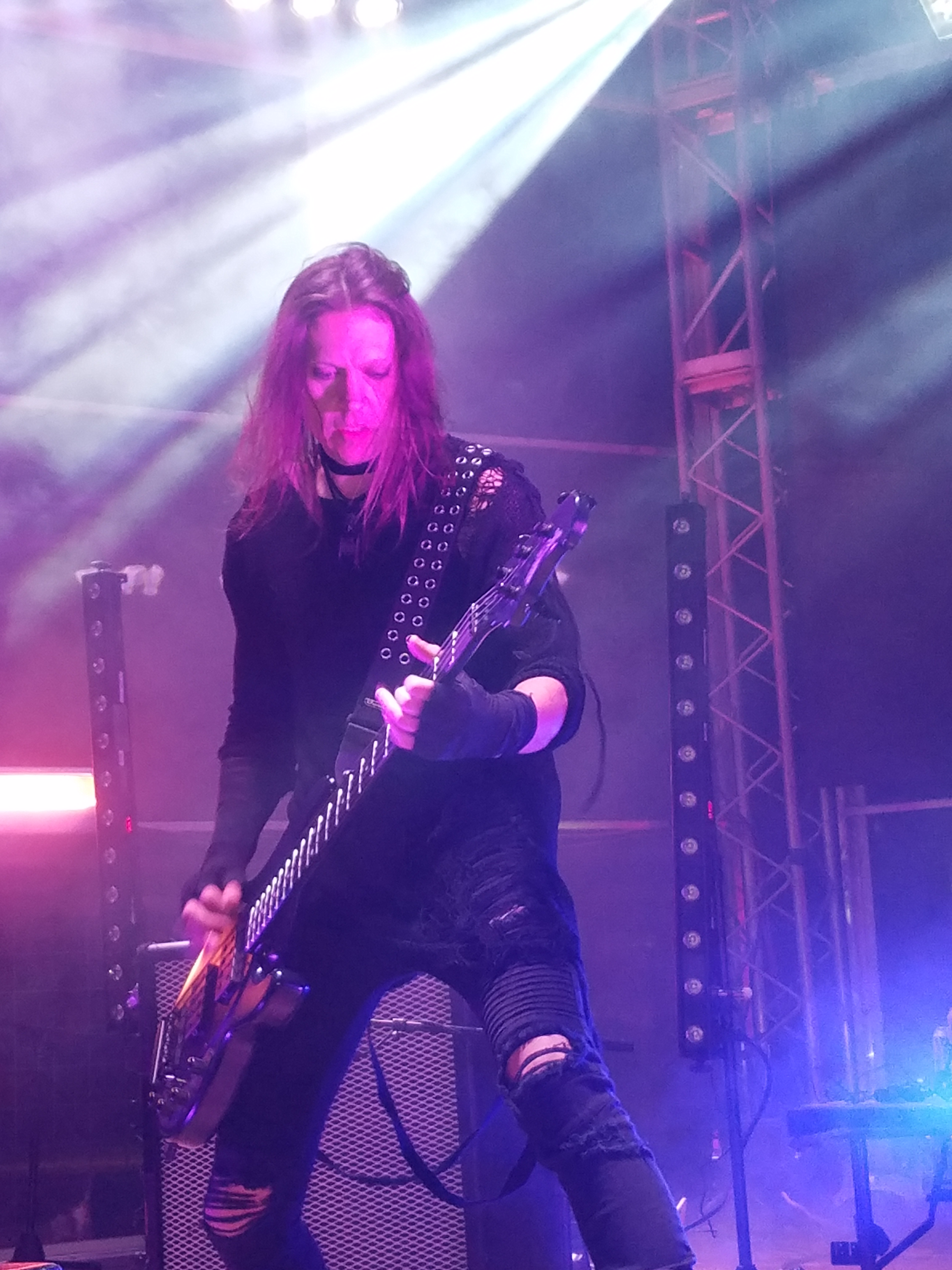
- Bost performing with Stabbing Westward in 2018

Background information
- Born: Carlton James Bost; April 8, 1975 (age 51); Charlotte, North Carolina, U.S.
- Genres: Industrial rock; electronic rock; gothic rock; new wave
- Occupation: Musician
- Instruments: Guitar; ztar; bass
- Years active: 1997–present
- Labels: Metropolis; Elementree Records; DreamWorks; EMI; Immortal; Louder; D1; Majestic
- Member of: Orgy; Deadsy; Berlin; Stabbing Westward
- Formerly of: Lunarclick
- Website: carltonbost.com

Carlton James Bost (born April 8, 1975), also known by the stage name Carlton Megalodon, is an American musician. He is the guitar player for the bands Orgy, Deadsy and Berlin, as well as the bass player for Stabbing Westward. Previously, he was the guitar player for Lunarclick. He has his own solo project, Shades of Scar, under which name he released The Hollow Season in 2010.

== Career ==
Born and raised in Charlotte, North Carolina, Bost relocated to Los Angeles upon graduating from Appalachian State University with a degree in Music Industry Studies in 1997 to pursue a career in music.

After working in recording studios for two years, he joined Elijah Blue Allman's band, Deadsy on Ztar and guitars and toured with the band as Carlton Megalodon over the next several years. The band's style is a synthesis of glam, goth and synth-rock, also categorized as "Undercore". Deadsy had been initially set to release their first full-length album, Commencement, on what was Sire Records, which became Elektra Records. Due to the poor timing of the label change up, the band began looking for a new label in 1999. Bost joined the band, after which they were signed to Jonathan Davis' Elementree Records, and Deadsy was asked to join the Family Values Tour in 2001. Commencement was released in May 2002.

By 2004, Deadsy had begun work on their follow-up album. That same year, Bost met Terri Nunn and joined the new wave band Berlin on guitars. He collaborated and co-produced with Nunn much of her new material.

Deadsy's Phantasmagore was released in 2006 on Immortal Records. The band was asked back to the Family Values Tour that summer, sharing the stage with Korn and Deftones. After Family Values came to an end, Deadsy went on tour with Deftones again that fall.

In February 2007, Deadsy went on hiatus while the band's members worked on other creative projects. Bost joined the industrial rock band The Dreaming – Christopher Hall from Stabbing Westward's newest project – full-time. From 2007 to 2011, Bost spent most of his time on The Dreaming as the band released two studio albums – Etched in Blood in 2008 and Puppet in 2011 – and toured in support of each. He released The Hollow Season under his solo project, Shades of Scar, at the end of August in 2010.

In 2011, Bost began playing guitar in the new Orgy line-up, headed by original frontman and band founder Jay Gordon. Orgy went out on the Bad Blood Tour in early 2012 and again in 2013 for the Wide Awake and Dead Tour. After two years spent mostly on the road, they returned to the studio to record their first collection of new material in eleven years which culminated in the release of the EP, Talk Sick in 2015, extensive touring in the US, Canada and South America in support of the EP, as well as plans for yet another future release in the works.

In February 2015, The Dreaming released Rise Again, which they'd been working on since 2013 through Metropolis Records and touring began in support soon after.

In April 2016, Stabbing Westward announced a 30th anniversary reunion show in their native town of Chicago as part of the Cold Waves Festival in late September 2016. The reunion was successful They embarked on a series of shows in the summer of 2017 and were one of the headlining acts at 2017's ColdWaves VI in Chicago and ColdWaves L.A. with the lineup of Chris Hall on vocals, Walter Flakus on keyboards, Mark Eliopolus on guitar, Bost on bass and Johnny Haro on drums. He has been in the studio and on tour with both Orgy and Berlin in 2017 and 2018 as well. In November 2018, Deadsy reformed and played a show at the San Quentin State Prison alongside Queens of the Stone Age. Deadsy's fourth album, Subterfugue, was also announced.

== Background and influences ==
In addition to playing guitar and bass, Bost is also a producer with a degree in audio production from the Los Angeles Recording School. He is endorsed by Schecter Guitars, Seymour Duncan and Mesa Boogie.

== Discography ==
=== Deadsy ===
- Commencement (2002)
- Phantasmagore (2006)
- Subterfugue (TBA)

=== The Dreaming ===
- Club Re-Mixes (2007)
- Etched in Blood (2008)
- Puppet (2011)
- Rise Again (2015)

=== Berlin ===
- 4Play (2005)
- Animal (2013)

=== Orgy ===
- Talk Sick (2015)

=== Shades of Scar ===
- The Hollow Season (2010)
