= Higher Ground (film) =

- Theatrical release poster
- Directed by: Vera Farmiga
- Screenplay by: Carolyn S. Briggs; Tim Metcalfe
- Based on: This Dark World by Carolyn S. Briggs
- Produced by: Claude Dal Farra; Renn Hawkey; Carly Hugo; Matt Parker; Jon Rubinstein
- Starring: Vera Farmiga; Joshua Leonard; Norbert Leo Butz; Dagmara Domińczyk; John Hawkes; Bill Irwin; Ebon Moss-Bachrach; Donna Murphy
- Cinematography: Michael McDonough
- Edited by: Colleen Sharp
- Music by: Alec Puro
- Production companies: The Group Entertainment; Ruminant Films
- Distributed by: Sony Pictures Classics
- Release dates: January 23, 2011 (Sundance); August 26, 2011 (United States)
- Running time: 114 minutes
- Country: United States
- Language: English
- Budget: $1.8 million
- Box office: $842,693

Higher Ground is a 2011 American drama film directed by Vera Farmiga in her directorial debut. The film is an adaptation of the 2002 memoir This Dark World: A Memoir of Salvation Found and Lost by Carolyn S. Briggs, who co-wrote the screenplay. The film follows Corinne Walker (Farmiga) and her vacillating relationship with Christianity. The cast also includes Joshua Leonard, John Hawkes, Donna Murphy, Norbert Leo Butz, and Bill Irwin.

The film had its world premiere at the Sundance Film Festival on January 23, 2011, where it was nominated for the Grand Jury Prize. It screened at the Los Angeles Film Festival on June 25, 2011, and received a limited release in the United States on August 26, 2011, by Sony Pictures Classics.

== Plot ==
In the early Sixties, Corinne Walker is a girl who is skeptical about God. After her brother is stillborn, her parents' marriage disintegrates over the course of several years. As a teenager, she meets Ethan Miller, a budding musician in local rock band The Renegades. The two marry after Corinne gets pregnant and have a daughter, Abigail. While touring with Ethan's band, their bus crashes into a river. Ethan rushes to save Abby, and Corinne pleads with God to save the child. Abby is pulled out of the bus before it sinks into the water, and Ethan believes that God wanted them to live. Ethan and Corinne grow more fond of Jesus, eventually giving themselves over to a radical New Testament church.

As adults, Corinne and Ethan live with their children—Abigail and Lilly—amid a community of self-described "Jesus freaks". Corinne's daily life consists of hours of Bible study and alternative family practices. The husbands are told by Pastor Bill that they should pay more attention to their wives' sexual needs after a fellow husband's indiscretions caused his wife to leave with their children. Corinne's closest friend Annika also warns her about keeping the marriage alive by trying new things, such as drawing their husbands' penises.

One day, Corinne's younger sister, Wendy, shows up on her doorstep after ending yet another bad relationship, and moves in with them. Their father comes over for dinner, and says that children are the most important things in life. He takes responsibility over how losing their baby brother caused him to wreck his marriage. Later, Ethan finds Lilly playing with some cocaine she found in Wendy's suitcase. He and Corinne flush the drugs down the toilet, and Wendy storms off.

As time passes, Corinne gets pregnant again. During a group meeting, Corinne tries to express her thoughts on what they can and cannot see. She gets shut down by Pastor Bill and his wife, because in their doctrine, women are forbidden to preach and cannot teach men. On another occasion, the pastor's wife admonishes Corinne about wearing dresses that could catch the attention of other male members of their community.

Corinne has a boy they name Gabe. Annika is diagnosed with a brain tumor. The community prays for her, and she survives a risky surgery, but suffers brain damage that leaves unable to walk or speak. Corinne becomes devastated and questions her faith: she stops attending services, and grows distant from Ethan. During a fight over Gabe's abilities, Ethan loses control and attempts to strangle Corinne. They try to see a couples therapist, Dr. Dick Adams, but his zealotry does not help them reconcile. Corinne leaves Ethan.

She starts exploring non-religious culture, and during one of her visits at the library, befriends an Irish mailman, Liam Donovan, a poetry enthusiast. Over several more casual encounters, they flirt. Liam lends Corinne some books and reads poems to her. During Gabe's seventh birthday party, Corinne's family pushes her to reconcile with Ethan, but she refuses to kiss him. Corinne's mother, who has remarried, is shown accepting her ex-husband's apologies for ruining their marriage, and his renewed affection.

Corinne is conflicted about returning to the church that her children still attend. She enters once while the building is empty, but a dog at the door catches her attention, and she finds herself outside, surrounded by dogs. Later, she sees Liam reading to children at the library, in the company of a woman who seems to be his girlfriend. Corinne attends a service to see Ethan and the children sing. She grabs the microphone and gives a speech in front of the pastor and the entire community, talking about her life experience with faith, her doubts, and what it means to stand on "higher ground".

== Cast ==
- Vera Farmiga as Corinne Walker
  - Taissa Farmiga as Teenage Corinne Walker
  - McKenzie Turner as Young Corinne Walker
- Joshua Leonard as Ethan Miller
  - Boyd Holbrook as Teenage Ethan Miller
- Dagmara Domińczyk as Annika
- Norbert Leo Butz as Pastor Bill
- John Hawkes as C.W. Walker
- Bill Irwin as Pastor Bud
- Ebon Moss-Bachrach as Luke
- Donna Murphy as Kathleen Walker
- Nina Arianda as Wendy Walker
  - Kaitlyn Rae King as Teenage Wendy Walker
  - Taylor Schwencke as Young Wendy Walker
- Michael Chernus as Ned
- Sean Mahon as Liam Donovan
- Jack Gilpin as Dr. Dick Adams
- Molly Hawkey as Molly

== Production ==
=== Development ===
In April 2010, it was announced that Vera Farmiga would make her directorial debut with the film. Higher Ground is loosely based on the memoir This Dark World by author Carolyn S. Briggs, who co-wrote the screenplay with Tim Metcalfe. The film was produced by Carly Hugo, Renn Hawkey, Jon Rubinstein, and Claude Dal Farra, and executive produced by Matt Parker, Lauren Munsch, Brice Dal Farra, and Jonathan Burkhart. Hawkey also served as the film's musical director. Hawkey's friend and Deadsy bandmate Alec Puro composed the music. Farmiga's cousin Adriana Farmiga served as the film's artist.

=== Casting ===
In June 2010, it was reported that Farmiga would also be starring in the film, and that she would be joined in the cast by Joshua Leonard, Norbert Leo Butz, John Hawkes, Dagmara Domińczyk, Bill Irwin, and Donna Murphy. Farmiga persuaded her younger sister Taissa Farmiga to portray Teenage Corinne Walker by offering her a Toyota Tacoma pickup truck in exchange. Farmiga stated that she asked Taissa to play the younger version of her character because of the genetic and physical similarities, and the relationship she had with her nephew Fynn, who played baby Abigail.

=== Filming ===
Principal photography for the film began in June 2010 in the Hudson Valley region, lasting approximately one month. Filming locations included the city of Kingston, the village of Ellenville, and the hamlets of Kerhonkson and Stone Ridge, New York. The film also shot scenes at Rondout Valley High School in Accord, New York.

== Distribution ==
=== Release ===
The film had its world premiere on January 23, 2011, at the Sundance Film Festival. Shortly after, Sony Pictures Classics acquired North American, Australian and New Zealand distribution rights to the film; the company later bought all rights for France, the United Kingdom, Ireland, Germany, Austria, the Benelux, Scandinavia, Italy, Portugal, Spain, South Africa, Eastern Europe, Latin America and Asia as well. It went on to screen at the Tribeca Film Festival, and the Los Angeles Film Festival. The film was given a limited release in the United States opening in three theaters on August 26, 2011. Due to Hurricane Irene, two of the three theaters were closed on Saturday and Sunday on its opening weekend.

It was released in New Zealand on March 1, 2012.

=== Home media ===
The film was released on Blu-ray and DVD on January 10, 2012. The film had its television premiere in Germany and Japan on January 7, 2013, and May 1, 2013, respectively.

== Reception ==
=== Box office ===
Higher Ground made $21,495 in its opening weekend. The film was shown in three theaters in the U.S. for a per theater average of $7,165. The film's widest release was in 81 theaters. It made a further $821,198 combined from U.S. and Canadian box office receipts, for a total international gross of $844,330.

=== Critical response ===
On review aggregator website Rotten Tomatoes, the film holds an approval rating of 81% based on 91 reviews, with a weighted average of 7.04/10. The critical consensus reads, "With Higher Ground, star and debuting director Vera Farmiga takes viewers on a challenging spiritual journey whose missteps are easily overcome by its many rich rewards." On Metacritic the film has a weighted average score of 74 out of 100, based on 34 critics, indicating "generally favorable" reviews.

A. O. Scott of The New York Times also gave a positive review, writing, "There is something remarkable – you might even say miraculous – about the way Higher Ground makes its gentle, thoughtful way across the burned-over terrain of the American culture wars. The film, directed with disarming grace and sharp intelligence by Vera Farmiga (who also stars in it), is about the conflict between skepticism and religious faith, but it does not treat that battle as an either/or, winner-take-all proposition. Movies about belief and believers frequently succumb to woozy piety or brittle contempt, but Higher Ground belongs, along with Robert Duvall's The Apostle and Michael Tolkin's under appreciated Rapture among the elect." Roger Ebert gave the film a positive review, awarding it 3.5 stars out of 4, writing, "Vera Farmiga's Higher Ground is the life story of a woman who grows into, and out of, Christianity. It values her at every stage of that process. It never says she is making the right or wrong decision, only that what she does seems necessary at the time she does it. In a world where believers and agnostics are polarized and hold simplified ideas about each other, it takes a step back and sees faith as a series of choices that should be freely made." David Edelstein of Vulture wrote, "Actress Vera Farmiga's directing debut, the religious drama Higher Ground, is amazingly graceful. The movie centers on Corinne (played by Farmiga), who joins and, a decade later, breaks away from a fundamentalist religious order, but the tone isn't irreverent, exactly. The movie is flushed with hope, wonder, heartbreak. In the memoir on which it's based, This Dark World, Carolyn S. Briggs (who co-wrote the screenplay with Tim Metcalfe) rejects God but can't stop longing for Him. And Farmiga frames the film version as a kind of love story, beginning with Corinne opening her eyes underwater, at the moment of her baptism, seeing men smiling down like heaven's welcoming committee. She doesn't ever want to come up for air."

=== Accolades ===
| Year | Award | Category | Recipient(s) | Result |
|---|---|---|---|---|
| 2011 | Alliance of Women Film Journalists | Best Woman Director | Vera Farmiga | Nominated |
| 2011 | Gotham Awards | Breakthrough Director | Vera Farmiga | Nominated |
| 2011 | Satellite Awards | Best Actress – Motion Picture | Vera Farmiga | Nominated |
| 2011 | Sundance Film Festival | Grand Jury Prize – Dramatic | Vera Farmiga | Nominated |
| 2012 | Artios Awards | Outstanding Achievement in Casting – Low Budget Feature | Kerry Barden, Paul Schnee | Nominated |
| 2012 | Central Ohio Film Critics Association | Best Overlooked Film | Higher Ground | Nominated |
