= Phantasmagore =

Studio album by Deadsy
- Released: August 22, 2006 (re-released and remastered November 2, 2020)
- Recorded: 2003–2006
- Studio: Korn Studios; Henson Recording; The War Room Studio; Los Angeles, California
- Genre: Gothic rock; electronic rock
- Length: 42:39
- Label: Immortal; Elementree
- Producer: Elijah Blue; Carlton Bost; Brian Humphrey

Deadsy chronology
Commencement (2002)	Phantasmagore (2006)	Subterfugue (TBA)

Professional ratings
Review scores
Source	Rating
AllMusic	3.5/5 stars
Ultimate Guitar	8.3/10

Phantasmagore is the third studio album from the rock band Deadsy. It was released on August 22, 2006, through Immortal Records. It was the band's last album before their hiatus in 2007 and reformation in 2017.

== Background ==
Deadsy first announced Phantasmagore in June 2003, and was tentatively slated for a release in late 2003/ early 2004 through their label, DreamWorks Records. This announcement was then followed a month later by the release of a snippet of a demo version of "Better than You Know". However, following the sale and merger of the label into Interscope, Deadsy and DreamWorks amicably parted ways in 2004, citing the changes in personnel at the label, though the band maintained they would still be working with Johnathan Davis' imprint label, Elementree Records. Davis also helped the band get signed to Immortal Records, whom Korn had been originally signed with.

== Release and promotion ==
The band released a music video for "Babes in Abyss" on their website in May 2005.

In July 2006, the album's final release date and tracklist were revealed.

A video shoot for the original choice for first single, "Book of Black Dreams", was planned for June at the Sedlec Ossuary in Prague, but had to be rescheduled, and was later cancelled.

To promote the record, Deadsy participated in the 2006 Family Values Tour. An acoustic version of "Carrying Over" was recorded on tour and featured on the Family Values 2006 album. They also made an appearance at Lollapalooza 2006. Between October and November, the band toured with Deftones as their opening act.

== Commercial performance ==
The album debuted at #176 on the Billboard 200 chart, selling 4,500 copies in its first week. Five weeks after its release, the album had sold 10,000 copies.

== Track listing ==
All tracks are written by Deadsy, except "Paint It Black", written by Mick Jagger and Keith Richards.

Original Release
No.	Title	Length
1.	"Razor Love"	3:02
2.	"Carrying Over"	3:50
3.	"Babes in Abyss"	3:15
4.	"Paint It Black" (The Rolling Stones cover)	3:19
5.	"Better than You Know"	5:37
6.	"Book of Black Dreams"	3:32
7.	"Asura"	3:24
8.	"The Last Story Ever"	3:33
9.	"Phantasmagore"	5:04
10.	"Time (I Am the Great Destroyer of Worlds)"	3:08
11.	"Health & Theory"	4:55

Remaster (2020)
No.	Title	Length
12.	"Friends (Bonus Track)"	3:54

Sample credits

- "Phantasmagore" contains elements from Tangerine Dream's "No Future (Get Off the Babysitter)", featured on the Risky Business original soundtrack.
- "Time" contains elements of Led Zeppelin's "Immigrant Song".

== Unreleased material ==
There are several tracks which were recorded but did not make it onto the album. A demo of one of these tracks, "Colossus", was given to MySpace members who participated in a promotional effort. The following tracks have been mentioned by the band in various interviews, yet did not appear on the album:

- "Do You Want It All?"
- "Comforter Cave"
- "Heaven & Earth"
- "Acacia"
- "Strength of Mind"
- "Dreamcrusher"

"Friends" was released as a single exclusively on iTunes, but was later included in the remastered version. The track "My Only Friend" (known as "Lady Day" on German release) appeared on the soundtrack for the movie Winter Passing and was recorded along with the Phantasmagore tracks. It is a cover, originally written and recorded by The Magnetic Fields. The track "Strength Of Mind” along with the band's cover of "Avalon" was leaked by Justin Perfect.

== Personnel ==
Adapted from liner notes.

Deadsy

- Phillips Exeter Blue I: vocals, guitar, bass and synthesizers
- Dr. Nner: synthesizer
- Alec Püre: drums
- Creature: bass
- Carlton Megalodon: Z-tar

Additional personnel

- Marty O'Brien: bass on "Carrying Over", "Phantasmagore" and "Friends"
- Les Hall: piano on "Health & Theory"
- Marty Alan: sitar on "Paint It Black"

== Charts ==
Chart (2006)	Peak position
US Billboard 200	176
US Top Independent Albums (Billboard)	17
