= Mall (film) =

2014 American film by Joseph Hahn

- Theatrical release poster
- Directed by: Joe Hahn
- Screenplay by: Sam Bisbee; Vincent D'Onofrio; Joe Vinciguerra
- Based on: Mall by Eric Bogosian
- Produced by: Vincent D'Onofrio; Joe Hahn; Sam Maydew
- Starring: Vincent D'Onofrio; Gina Gershon; Cameron Monaghan; James Frecheville; John Hensley; Sianoa Smit-McPhee; Stephen Taylor
- Cinematography: Richard Henkels
- Edited by: Igor Kovalik
- Music by: Alec Puro; Chester Bennington; Dave Farrell; Joe Hahn; Mike Shinoda
- Production companies: Silver Lining Entertainment; 5 Minutes Productions; Good Smile Company; Dwango Co., Ltd
- Distributed by: Paragon Pictures
- Release dates: June 18, 2014 (France); October 17, 2014 (United States)
- Running time: 88 minutes
- Country: United States
- Language: English

Mall is a 2014 American independent thriller film based on a novel of the same name written by Eric Bogosian and directed by Linkin Park turntablist Joe Hahn, with Vincent D'Onofrio starring and serving as executive producer. Peter Stormare, Gina Gershon, Mimi Rogers, Brian Rodriguez and Cameron Monaghan also star in the film. The film was produced by Hahn, Vincent D'Onofrio, and Sam Maydew. The film is Hahn's full-length directorial debut and his second directed film after The Seed, which was a 10-minute short. The film revolves around the lives of five disaffected suburbanites as they come together at a shopping mall. The film was released on June 18, 2014, in France, on July 16 in Sweden, and on October 17 in North America to mixed reviews from critics.

== Plot ==
Mal, an addict, shoots his mother, sets their trailer on fire, and heads to the mall. At the same time, a cop urges philosophical college student Jeff to stop loitering on private property. Jeff and his friend Adelle also go to the mall, as Jeff tells her about his belief that modern society has become soulless and a shallow facsimile of itself. Jeff describes several of the people that they see at the mall and narratives what he imagines their back story to be: Donna, a bored housewife who obsesses over her attractiveness; Barry, a salesman who hates his business but stays in it because he understands it; Michael, a security guard who, after immigrating, becomes a widower and lives only for his job; and Danny, a married businessman who engages in casual sex.

Jeff and Adelle meet up with Beckett and Shel, and Beckett shares ecstasy with Jeff. Beckett attempts to talk Jeff out of his crush on Adelle, to no avail. When Danny is arrested (by the same cop who hassled Jeff) for peeping on Donna who forgets to lock the fitting room door while she changes clothes, Beckett and Shel leave to gawk at the scene. Alone with Adelle, Jeff confesses to her that he has fallen in love with her, but she calls him unexciting and wanders off. Mal arrives at the mall and kills Barry, who is his father, and several cops. Hurt, Jeff stumbles in a drug-addled daze through the mall, not aware of the crowds that have begun to flee. Mal leaves the mall, kills the cops who arrested Danny, and heads to the forest. Michael grabs a spare rifle from Mal's car and follows him.

Beckett, Shel, and Adelle arrive in the parking lot, where they find Danny still handcuffed. As they discuss what to do with him, he begs them to free him so that he can go home. After Beckett and Shel leave to vandalize the mall, Adelle points out that she can do anything she wants to Danny. She moves him to his own car, binds him in place with a seat belt, tightens his handcuffs, and molests him while forcing him to repeat, "I'm a pervert." She leaves once he passes out. Meanwhile, Jeff meets Donna in a bar, and after he tells her that she does not look old enough to have kids, she invites him to a motel room, where they have sex. Unconcerned with what has happened at the mall, Donna merely asks for details so that she can craft a believable cover story.

Jeff wanders back to the mall, where he discovers Beckett and Shell taking pictures of Danny with their cell phones. Jeff chases them away and offers to take Danny to a hospital. Danny requests that he be brought back to his home. When Danny asks Jeff if he knows Adelle based on her description, Jeff says that she is not a friend. Satisfied, Danny approaches his house, still handcuffed. As Jeff walks off, he encounters Mal, who ended up wounded after a shootout with Michael. Mal and Jeff talk briefly, and Mal requests that Jeff kill him. Jeff refuses and calls him a coward who is willing to die but not to live. As Jeff runs off, the cops gather for an assault on Mal's location. As Donna returns to her boring life, Jeff quotes Steppenwolf, saying that one day he will learn to laugh. The film ends as he laughs.

== Cast ==
The casting for the film was done by Angela Demo and Barbara J. McCarthy.

- Vincent D'Onofrio as Danny
- Gina Gershon as Donna
- Cameron Monaghan as Jeff
- James Frecheville as Mal
- John Hensley as Lenny
- Reid Ewing as Beckett
- India Menuez as Adelle
- Sianoa Smit-McPhee as Shel
- Stephen Taylor as Gus
- B. K. Cannon as a sales girl
- Michael Patrick McGill as Ed
- Ron Yuan as a cop who hassles Jeff and arrests Danny
- Dean Cudworth as Gary
- Peter Stormare as Barry
- Gbenga Akinnagbe as Michel

Kimberly Kane and Juelz Ventura appear in cameos as pornographic actresses.

== Production ==
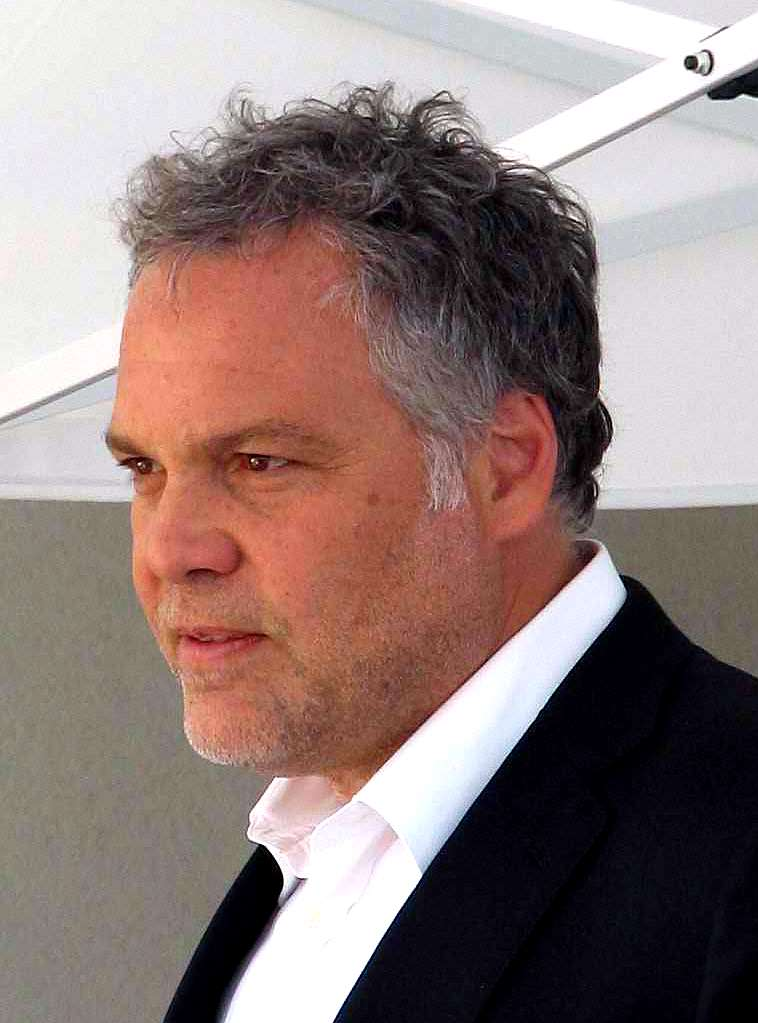
D'Onofrio wrote, produced and starred in the film

The production of the film was handled by various producers. But it was mainly handled by Vincent D'Onofrio. Whereas the others were Erika Hampson and Sam Maydew. The executive producers included Shaked Berenson and Patrick Ewald.

The film was directed by Joe Hahn of American rock band Linkin Park. Other band members, including Chester Bennington, assisted in scoring the film's soundtrack.

== Filming ==
Principal photography took place in the Eastern part of Los Angeles. More information about the location of the set was kept as a secret. A bit of information was given to Linkin Park Underground members who lived in Los Angeles by giving them a chance to meet Joe Hahn. Shooting began in April 2012.

In the tweet-out sessions, Hahn answered a question that, "The movie was shot a year ago, and we're finishing the album right now." In another question, Hahn said that "the movie is coming along well. We finished it, and we are getting ready to put it out, and hopefully you would see it soon." Hahn stated about the comparison between directing a video and a film:

It's different to make a film and a video, because you have a lot more time. And you're dealing with a larger production, and you're dealing with dialogue and people interacting. Whereas videos can be more in expressions to cool images where you could make some stories. It's almost like, sometimes when I approach videos, it's like I'm creating a commercial for a movie that I want to make, but we can only shoot so much of it. And for movies, it's really what the script tells you to do. When you see a scene, you can figure out how it should look, and we really use the story and the script as a road map to do what I want to do.

— Joe Hahn

In another interview with Forbes, Hahn again explains the difference as:

"I think there are a lot of parallels and a lot of differences," says Hahn. "[With videos], you want to capture the essence of the music and help people recognize whoever is making the music. With movies … you have to have a pretty rock-solid script. If the script is strong, you can really play around with ideas and allow people to be really creative, as long as they're within the guidelines of what you, the director, are expecting."

— Joe Hahn

== Promotion ==
A trailer was released in the promotion of the film, which was also leaked on the internet at the end of May. But in support of that the film had few teasers which were launched on the Facebook page of the film. All the teasers were available on July 25, 2014. Another list of sneak peeks was released via Facebook and YouTube on October 14.

Another trailer of the film was officially released on the Facebook page of the band, which is a couple of minutes long.

An Art exhibition inspired by the film named as Beast Astray was put up on September 25, 2014, at Known Gallery, Los Angeles, for the promotion of the film. The exhibition was put up by the sponsorship and support of Machine Shop, Red Bull, Good Smile company, and various others.

== Music ==
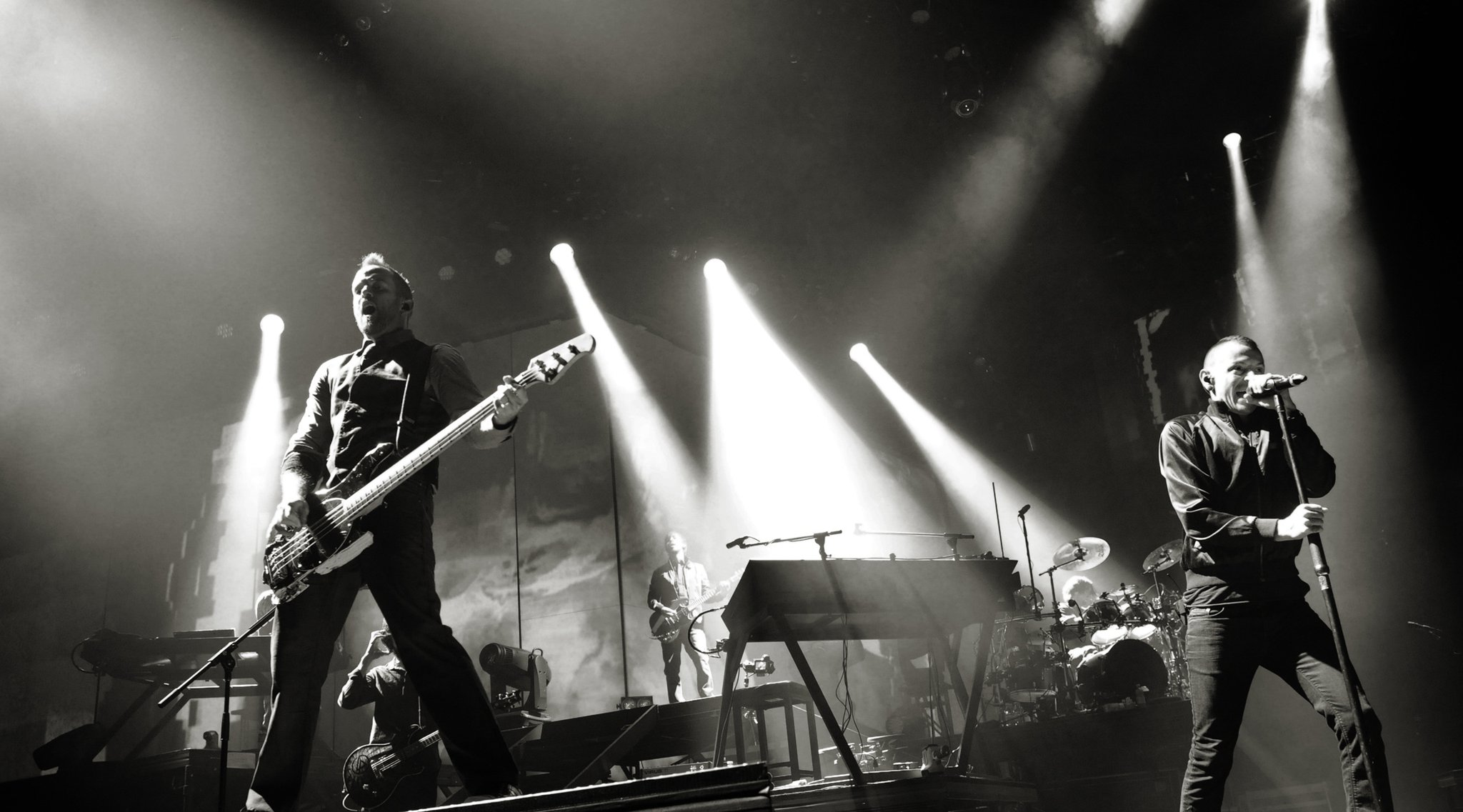
Linkin Park collaborated with Alec Puro for the score

The music for the film was composed by Deadsy drummer Alec Puro and Linkin Park members Chester Bennington, Dave Farrell, Joe Hahn and Mike Shinoda. The soundtrack for The Seed, the first installment by Hahn featured three songs. One of them was "There They Go" by Fort Minor (originally from his studio debut album, The Rising Tied) played during the credits, and the other two were untitled and were played during the fight scenes. This would be the sixth soundtrack and the second score by the band, after their soundtracks for the hit music series of the 2007 hit film, Transformers. The previous soundtrack by the band was the 2011 film Transformers: Dark of the Moon. The first score by the band was a collaboration with Steve Jablonsky for the 2009 film Transformers: Revenge of the Fallen. The soundtrack for the film was released under the Warner Bros. and Machine Shop record labels on December 12, 2014.

In a tweet-out session, Joe answered the question about the score: "The movie is done! The score is finished! And we are putting it out to distributors and see who's going to put it out. So it's going to come soon." A song named as "It Goes Through", which Shinoda provides lead vocals on, as he also did for "The Last Line" and "Devil's Drop", for the 2-minute trailer that was released on May 28, 2014, in promotion for Mall, was featured in the movie trailer, which could be the first single from the soundtrack of the film. The official trailer to Mall was launched via Linkin Park's official Facebook page on August 9, 2014.

== Release ==
In October 2013, Joe Hahn had developed a few toys for Transformers G1, and there in an interview, he said that the film would be released in 2014. The film made an exclusive screening at Zachary Levi and The Nerd Machine's 5th annual Nerd HQ event on July 24, 2014, at Petco Park in San Diego immediately after the band's performance at the MTVU Fandom Awards, as well as performing their second hit single "Until It's Gone" from The Hunting Party. Mall had its theatrical premiere in Los Angeles on October 14, 2014, and had a limited released on October 17, 2014. It was released in Canada on October 24 and debuted on iTunes on October 31. It was released on video on demand in November 2014.

== Reception ==
Zach Hollwedel of Under the Radar rated it 4/10 stars and called it "an angry letter to consumerist America with little redemptive value". A review in Forbes was much more positive and concluded, "You can watch Mall as a basic low-budget horror-thriller about people making their way through a mass shooting event, and you'll be satisfied enough. But the real pleasures come from considering the deeper layers, and from the oldschool nods to grindhouse sensibilities and psychedelic theater."
