= King (pop band) =

Rodolfo. Cabrer

KING
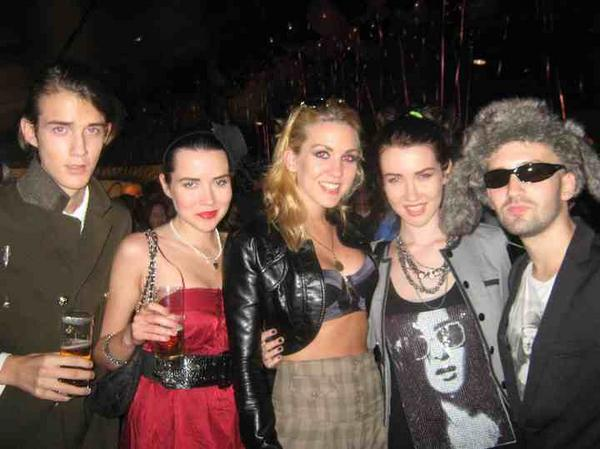
- Lucius, Queenie, Jazzy, Ruby, and Trillion (left to right) at Nobu Matsuhisa in Malibu, Los Angeles

Background information
- Origin: Mayfair, London
- Genres: Pop, dance-pop, pop rap
- Years active: 1997–present
- Labels: EMI
- Members: Trillion; Queenie; Jemima; Lucius
- Past members: Jazzy; Ruby

King (stylised KING) are an English pop/hip hop quartet, started in 1997. The band consisted originally of five siblings, Trillion, Queenie, Jazzy, Ruby, and Lucius. In November 2013, Jazzy and Ruby left the quintet to form their own band Blonde Electra and their younger sister Jemima joined the group.

== History ==
The three eldest siblings were born in India and the two younger ones in Ukraine. All were home-schooled by their father, Michael Jaffray King (British) and mother, Irmgard King (German). They were raised in over 30 countries throughout the world. Due to being born in different countries and having parents from two countries, all siblings have dual citizenship. They are fluent in four languages.

They have two younger sisters, Jemima and Michelle King, who currently reside in Cologne, Germany with their parents.

Marieangela "Queenie" King married, on 1 December 2013, musician and artist Elijah Blue Allman, the son of Cher and Gregg Allman and frontman of Deadsy.

== Music ==
Their music and performance is characterised by electronic raps, big melodic choruses and unique fashion styles.

== Early life ==
They began their professional singing careers in 1997 and quickly moved on to do TV and radio shows in several countries around the world. In 1998, Word Records/Warner Music Group (US) approached the group and offered them a $4 million recording contract which was, however, rejected by both parents as they felt the siblings were too young to take on the music business at that time.

== The band ==
In 2007, they formed their own band called King Family, and started writing/producing their own songs. They were soon signed to EMI Capitol Records in Germany.

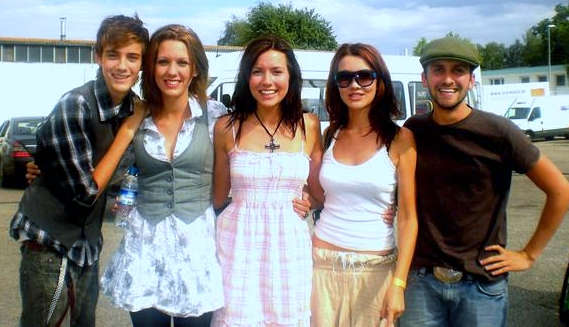
Lucius, Jazzy, Queenie, Ruby and Trillion in Hanover 2008 (photo by JasminG)

In January 2008, their debut single "Carry Me Home" was released and made it into the German Single Charts. Only three months later, the album of the same name, as well as the second single "Perfect Day" appeared, which also reached a position in the charts. A tour throughout Germany, TV appearances and numerous public performances followed.

In June 2009, the siblings parted ways with EMI. They renamed their band to 'KING' and moved to the US to pursue their musical careers. This move was supported by the American music manager Doc McGhee (long time manager of Kiss. The band has written with songwriters and producers with the likes of Grammy Award winner Glen Ballard, Bonnie McKee, Mitch Allan, Jon Ingoldsby and Justin Trugman.

They have homes in Hollywood, California and in Mayfair, London. The siblings are currently recording their 2nd studio album and working on television projects.

In December 2013, KING released the music video "B.O.M.B.", directed by Nicholaus Goossen.

== Members ==
- Trillion (born 2 March 1985 as Michael Phillip King in Pune, India)
- Queenie (born 16 July 1987 as Marieangela King in Bombay, India)
- David Lucius King (born 3 February 1995 in Perechyn, Ukraine)
- Jemima (born 17 April)

== Former members ==
- Jazzy (born 19 February 1990 as Jasmina King in Bombay, India)
- Ruby (born 7 May 1992 as Natalia King in Uzhhorod, Ukraine)

== Discography ==
=== Albums ===
| Year | Title | Chart positions | | |
| Year | Title | DE | AT | CH |
|---|---|---|---|---|
| 2008 | Carry Me Home | – | – | – |

=== Singles ===
| Year | Title | Chart positions | | | Album |
| Year | Title | DE | AT | CH | Album |
|---|---|---|---|---|---|
| 2008 | "Carry Me Home"; VÖ: 25. January 2008 | 70 | – | – | Carry Me Home |
| 2008 | "Perfect Day"; VÖ: 4. April 2008 | 68 | – | – | Carry Me Home |
