= Deadsy (album) =

Studio album by Deadsy
- Released: February 25, 1997 (scheduled)
- Recorded: 1996
- Studio: NRG Recording Studios (North Hollywood, California); Westlake Recording Studios (West Hollywood, California); Dreamland Recording Studios (Hurley, New York); Nordic Estates (Whistler, British Columbia)
- Genre: Electronic rock; gothic rock
- Length: 42:54
- Label: Sire; WitcHouse
- Producer: Josh Abraham; Elijah Blue

Deadsy chronology
Deadsy (1997)	Commencement (2002)

Singles from Deadsy
- 1. "The Elements" Released: January 1997

Professional ratings
Review scores
Source	Rating
AllMusic	3/5 stars

Deadsy is the debut studio album by American rock band Deadsy. It was scheduled for release on February 25, 1997, by Sire Records. Several promotional compact discs and compact cassettes of the album, as well as a CD-single for "The Elements", were sent out to members of the press and radio stations, but the release was pulled less than a month before its release date by distributor Elektra Entertainment Group. Sire Records eventually secured a new distribution deal through Warner Music Group but it was again shelved; the release ultimately evolved into Commencement in 1998.

== Background, recording and promotion ==
New Yorker Brian Sirgutz discovered Deadsy in early 1996, and signed the band to a production deal through his imprint, WitcHouse, and to his management company, Eerie. Sirgutz then made contact with Risa Morley, an A&R representative at Sire Records, who in turn passed Deadsy on to her boss, Seymour Stein; Stein was responsible for signing Deadsy to Sire Records, backed by a new distribution and financing deal secured through Elektra Entertainment Group.

The band's eponymous debut album, Deadsy, was recorded with producer Josh Abraham at several different recording studios throughout 1996, including NRG Recording Studios in North Hollywood, California; Westlake Recording Studios in West Hollywood, California; Dreamland Recording Studios in Hurley, New York; and Nordic Estates in Whistler, British Columbia. The bass guitar duties on Deadsy were divided between founding band member Elijah Blue Allman, and his friend Jay Gordon, who later quit Deadsy to form his own band, Orgy. Deadsy was mastered by Howie Weinberg at Masterdisk in Peekskill, New York.

Deadsy's original content varies greatly from the selection of songs that later appeared on Commencement. Only five of the nine songs from Deadsy appear on Commencement: "Lake Waramaug," "The Elements," "Flowing Glower," "Future Years," and "Cruella." These were heavily re-mixed and partly re-recorded for their eventual use on Commencement.

The four remaining songs ("From Beyond", "This Goodnight", "Anti-Pop", and "Sleepy Hollow") were never released elsewhere. "Anti-Pop" is a Kommunity FK cover, which originally appeared on the band's 1983 album The Vision and the Voice, while "Sleepy Hollow" features a guest appearance by KoЯn vocalist, Jonathan Davis. Another song recorded during the album sessions, but that was left out, was "Replicas"; a Gary Numan cover which originally appeared on Tubeway Army's 1979 album Replicas. The cover song was exclusively released by Beggars Banquet Records on the Gary Numan Various Artists tribute album Random, on June 10, 1997.

With Deadsy scheduled for worldwide release on February 25, 1997, Sire Records started pushing "The Elements" to college radio stations as the lead CD single in January 1997. This was paired with several variations of advanced and promotional copies of the full-length album, sent to radio stations and members of the press, between December 1996 and February 1997. By early February 1997, however, Elektra Entertainment Group began doubting the potential of the release and decided to quietly shelve it. Deadsy then attempted to part ways with Elektra Entertainment Group, but Sire Records remained hopeful and continued to shop the record around to other major distributors through the WEA grapevine. Warner Music Group eventually agreed to distribute Deadsy in early 1998, but by this time, Deadsy had recorded additional material and revamped their self-titled debut into Commencement. The track listing for Commencement only changed slightly when originally scheduled for release on May 5, 1998; but it would change drastically over the years, as it was repeatedly delayed (first to October 26, 1999, then to October 2000, then to summer 2001) and dropped by record labels and distributors, until it was finally released on May 14, 2002.

== Track listing ==
Songwriting credits are adapted from the album's liner notes.

No.	Title	Lyrics	Music	Length
1.	"Lake Waramaug"	Allman	Allman	4:32
2.	"The Elements"	Allman	Allman	5:21
3.	"Flowing Glower"	Allman; Richman	Allman	4:58
4.	"Future Years"	Allman	Allman	5:26
5.	"From Beyond"	Allman	Allman; Hawkey; Puro	3:29
6.	"Anti-Pop"	Mata	Mata	3:35
7.	"Cruella"	Allman	Allman	5:54
8.	"This Goodnight"	Allman; Miller	Allman	4:59
9.	"Sleepy Hollow"	Allman; Davis	Allman	4:51
Total length:				42:54

== Personnel ==
Credits are adapted from the album's liner notes.

Deadsy

- Elijah Blue – vocals, guitar, bass on "Lake Waramaug", "The Elements", "From Beyond", "Anti-Pop", and "This Goodnight", synthesizers
- Renn Hawkey – synthesizers
- Alec Puro – drums, percussion

Additional musicians

- Jay Gordon – bass guitar on "Flowing Glower", "Future Years", "Cruella" and "Sleepy Hollow".
- Jonathan Davis – vocals on "Sleepy Hollow"

Production and design

- Elijah Blue – production
- Josh Abraham – production and engineering at NRG Recording Studios in North Hollywood and Westlake Recording Studios in West Hollywood, California
- Jason Roberts – mixing at NRG Recording Studios in North Hollywood, California
- Chad Fridirici – mixing and engineering at Westlake Recording Studios in West Hollywood, California
- John Ewing Jr. – assistant mixing at NRG Recording Studios in North Hollywood, California
- Sue Kappa – assistant mixing at Dreamland Recording Studios in Hurley, New York
- Anthony "Fu" Valcic – engineering at Nordic Estates, Whistler, British Columbia
- Howie Weinberg – mastering at Masterdisk in Peekskill, New York
- Doug Bizzaro – photography
- Deadsy – art direction
- Adam Hawkey – design
- Renn Hawkey – design
- Mary Iggy Frey – design
- Risa Morley – A&R at Sire Records
- Seymour Stein – A&R at Sire Records
- Brian M. Sirgutz – management at Eerie, executive producer for WitcHouse
- Lisa Sweet – business management for RZO
- Seth Lichtenstein – legal at Hansen, Jacobson, Teller & Hoberman
