= Renn Hawkey =

American musician and music producer

- Born: Renn McDonnell Hawkey; March 29, 1974 (age 52); New York City, U.S.
- Other name: Dr. Nner
- Occupations: Musician; songwriter; music producer; tv producer; film producer; real estate business
- Years active: 1995–present
- Height: 1.90 m (6 ft 3 in)
- Spouse: Vera Farmiga (m. 2008)
- Children: 2
- Relatives: Molly Hawkey (sister)
- Musical career
- Genres: Gothic rock; alternative rock; electronic rock
- Instruments: Synthesizer; keyboards; guitar; piano; vocals
- Member of: The Yagas
- Formerly of: Deadsy

Renn McDonnell Hawkey (born March 29, 1974) is an American musician, songwriter, music producer, and occasional actor. He played the synthesizer for the rock band Deadsy. He performed on their unreleased self-titled debut album (1996) and subsequent releases Commencement (2002) and Phantasmagore (2006).

In 2011, Hawkey served as musical director and producer on his wife Vera Farmiga's directorial debut film Higher Ground, and in 2017, he executive produced the documentary film Unspoken. In 2015, he had a recurring role as Paul Koretsky in the A&E series The Returned.

Since 2024, he has been a member of the rock band The Yagas, alongside his wife. He also produced their debut album Midnight Minuet (2025).

== Early life ==
Hawkey was born in New York City, and grew up in Ossining, New York. He is the third of five children born to Penelope "Penny" (née Sharp), an advertising executive who wrote the Coca-Cola commercial "Hey Kid, Catch!", and William Stevenson "Bill" Hawkey, who also worked in advertising. His parents now own and operate Sundial Farm, a plant nursery in Ossining. Hawkey has four full siblings: Adam, a film compositor and colorist, Robin, a chiropractor, Timothy, a marketing managing director, and Molly, an actress and comedian. He also has two paternal half-siblings from his father's first marriage: William, a headmaster of The Pennington School, and Elisabeth, a corporate chef.

Hawkey attended the Hyde School in Maine, where he met future bandmate Elijah Blue Allman, and subsequently spent a semester studying at Sarah Lawrence College. During his childhood, he played the piano and cello.

== Career ==
=== Music ===
Hawkey was the third member to join Deadsy after frontman Elijah Blue Allman sent him a Juno-106 synth and a demo tape made by Allman and drummer Alec Puro. The band's style was a fusion of glam, goth and synth-rock. Each member of the band represented a color and "entity", with Hawkey's being yellow and science and medicine, respectively. The members also had their own unique appearance; Hawkey would dress in medical scrubs. In 1999, Deadsy received attention from labels and notable musicians, with their first gig at The Viper Room attracting members of Limp Bizkit, Orgy, Sugar Ray, and Thirty Seconds to Mars.

The band's debut studio album, Commencement, was released on May 14, 2002, after signing to Jonathan Davis' Elementree Records, a division of DreamWorks Records. In addition to playing the synthesizer on Commencement, Hawkey also programmed and played guitar on a number of the tracks. The band subsequently released their first music video, for the song "The Key to Gramercy Park", with Davis providing guest vocals on the track and Fred Durst directing. That same year, Deadsy was invited by Korn to join the Family Values Tour, along with Puddle of Mudd, Stone Temple Pilots, and Linkin Park.

In 2002, Hawkey also worked with Thirty Seconds to Mars on their self-titled debut album, playing the synthesizer on the song "Capricorn (A Brand New Name)". Deadsy left DreamWorks in 2004, citing its sale to Interscope Records as one of the reasons. In 2006, Deadsy was asked to again join Korn and co-headliners Deftones on the Family Values Tour 2006. The band released their second studio album, Phantasmagore, on August 22, 2006, through Immortal Records. This album would ultimately mark Hawkey's final appearance as part of Deadsy. The band went on hiatus in April 2007, after which Hawkey began a career in carpentry.

In November 2018, Deadsy reformed and played a show at the San Quentin State Prison alongside Queens of the Stone Age. Hawkey announced his departure in 2023. Since 2024, he has been a member of the alternative and gothic rock band The Yagas, alongside his wife Vera Farmiga.

=== Film ===
Prior to being a film producer, Hawkey had a cameo role as a musician in the musical comedy film The Singing Detective (2003). As a film producer, Hawkey has worked on the drama film Higher Ground (2011), directed by Farmiga, in which he was also an uncredited and unnamed extra and served as the music director. In 2015, he appeared in the first, seventh, and eighth episodes of the Carlton Cuse-produced A&E supernatural drama series The Returned in the supporting role of Paul Koretsky, a father grieving the death of his son in a fatal bus crash. He served as an executive producer on the documentary film Unspoken (2017).

== Personal life ==
In 2004, Hawkey began dating actress Vera Farmiga after being introduced by mutual friend Allen Hughes on the set of Touching Evil. The couple married in a private ceremony on September 13, 2008, when Farmiga was five months pregnant with their son, Fynn McDonnell Hawkey, who was born on January 13, 2009, in Rhinebeck, New York. Farmiga gave birth to a daughter, Gytta Lubov Hawkey, on November 4, 2010. The family splits their time between homes in New York City and Vancouver.

== Discography ==
As member of Deadsy:

- Deadsy (unreleased; scheduled for 1997)
- Commencement (2002)
- Phantasmagore (2006)

As member of The Yagas:

- Midnight Minuet (2025)

== Filmography ==
Year	Title	Functioned as		Role	Type	Notes
Year	Title	Producer	Actor	Role	Type	Notes
2003	The Singing Detective		Yes	Dark's Bass Player	Film	
2011	Higher Ground	Yes		—N/a	Film	Also music director
2015	The Returned		Yes	Paul Koretsky	TV series	3 episodes
2017	Unspoken	Executive		—N/a	Documentary	
