= Korn Kovers =

Unreleased album by Korn

Studio album by Korn
- Released: Unreleased
- Recorded: Various years

Korn Kovers is an unreleased cover album project by American nu metal band Korn.

In August 2016, during an interview with Billboard on their 12th studio record The Serenity of Suffering, Jonathan Davis, Fieldy and Ray Luzier mentioned that they are in the process of working on the record, but did not mention any information on songs or a possible release date. Fieldy has since left the band.

== Recording and production ==
In an interview, vocalist Jonathan Davis stated that there are no explicit details for when the album will be released, and that it is just something the band would be working on during their spare time. Despite the silence that ensued following the album's failure to meet its unspecified April 2005 release date, Davis confirmed in an interview on July 18, 2007, that the band still intended to complete the project. In November 2008, on his official site, Jonathan Davis stated that they still plan on releasing the album. In a 2010 interview with Fieldy, he stated that he hopes on releasing it soon, after the band does some more covers. Songs may still be released in the future through other means.

== Track listing ==
=== Confirmed titles ===
The track listing has undergone various revisions throughout development since early reports from October 2004. However, the following listing includes those that were originally revealed when Korn Kovers was announced. Korn has gone on to restate their desire to cover the same tracks on multiple occasions. "Fight the Power" was originally recorded exclusively for Korn Kovers, but has since appeared on the XXX: State of the Union soundtrack in 2005. "Love My Way" received airplay in 2005, which led to an MP3 rip of the song surfacing on the Internet shortly after. It has been mentioned that P. Exeter Blue I of American rock band Deadsy provided backing vocals on the track. In regards to "God of Emptiness", on July 19, 2007, Blabbermouth.net reported that there is currently no confirmation regarding whether Korn's version of the track, which was recorded during sessions of their fourth studio album Issues, will appear on Korn Kovers.

Title	Original performer	Featured guest(s)	Source
"Diary of a Madman"	Ozzy Osbourne		
"Erotic City"	Prince		
"Fight the Power"	Public Enemy	Xzibit	
"Head Like a Hole"	Nine Inch Nails	Chester Bennington	
"Love My Way"	The Psychedelic Furs	P. Exeter Blue I	
"Paranoid"	Black Sabbath		
"Shout at the Devil"	Mötley Crüe		
"We Care a Lot"	Faith No More		

=== Possible inclusions ===
Title	Original performer	Featured guest(s)	Source
"God of Emptiness"	Morbid Angel		
"Lookout Weekend"	Debbie Deb		

== Personnel ==
- Jonathan Davis – vocals
- James "Munky" Shaffer – guitars
- Brian "Head" Welch – guitars
- Reginald "Fieldy" Arvizu – bass
- Roberto "Ra" Diaz – bass
- Ray Luzier – drums
- David Silveria – drums
- Xzibit – guest vocals
- Chester Bennington – guest vocals
- P. Exeter Blue I – guest vocals
