= Elijah Blue Allman =

American musician (born 1976)

- Born: Elijah Sky Blue Allman; July 10, 1976 (age 50); Los Angeles, California, U.S.
- Occupations: Musician; singer
- Years active: 1989–present
- Spouse: Marieangela King (m. 2013; sep. 2025)
- Children: 1
- Parents: Gregg Allman (father); Cher (mother)
- Relatives: Chaz Bono (half-brother); Layla Allman (half-sister); Devon Allman (half-brother); Michael Allman (half-brother); Georgia Holt (grandmother)
- Musical career
- Also known as: P. Exeter Blue
- Genres: Gothic rock; electronic rock; gothic metal; industrial rock
- Instruments: Guitar; vocals
- Member of: Deadsy; Elijah Blue and the Trapezoids

Elijah Sky Blue Allman (born July 10, 1976), known professionally as P. Exeter Blue I (Phillips Exeter Blue), is an American musician known for leading the group Deadsy.

He is the son of singer-actress Cher and singer-songwriter Gregg Allman. He is the half-brother of Chaz Bono, Delilah Allman, Michael Allman, Layla Allman, and Devon Allman.

== Career ==
Allman is the singer and guitarist for the rock band Deadsy which, prior to its hiatus in April 2007, consisted of Alec Püre on drums, Dr. Nner on synthesizer, Carlton Megalodon on Ztar, and Jens Funke on bass. The band's style is a synthesis of glam, goth and synth-rock, and was also categorized as "Undercore". Deadsy released two albums: 2002's Commencement, and Phantasmagore, which came out on August 22, 2006. Many of the themes used by Allman in Deadsy have been heavily influenced by the 1955 film This Island Earth.

He was given his first guitar by Kiss bassist Gene Simmons, and at age 13, went on tour as a guitarist with Cher; he appears as a guitarist in the music video for her song "If I Could Turn Back Time". In 1994, he auditioned for the spot of guitarist for Nine Inch Nails, but ended up losing the spot to Robin Finck.

He has worked with Thirty Seconds to Mars for the band's self-titled debut album. and has also provided guest vocals on a variety of songs for other bands including Orgy, Coal Chamber and Sugar Ray.

As of 2026, Allman's musical career was effectively defunct, as it had ceased drawing any meaningful income; his sole source of money by then was a trust fund established by his late father Gregg.

== Personal life ==
Allman attended the Hyde School in Bath, Maine, graduating in 1994.

Allman has dated Bijou Phillips, Heather Graham, Kate Hudson, and Paris Hilton.

Through his mother Cher, Allman is of Armenian, Irish, English, German, Dutch and French descent.

On December 1, 2013, he married Marieangela King, "Queenie", an English singer, of the band King and sister of Jazzy and Ruby King from the British pop duo Blonde Electra. The couple broke up on April 20, 2020, and Allman filed for divorce the following year. The divorce has been dismissed and the couple remain together.

In 2014, Allman admitted that he began taking drugs at age 11 and battled heroin addiction for years, but claimed that he had been sober since 2008.

In 2023, Allman's wife, Marieangela King, alleged in a court filing that, on his mother's orders, Allman had been kidnapped from a hotel room where they had been trying to "work out their marriage" on their anniversary in November 2022. King said that she did not know where he was and had no way to contact him.

In 2023, Allman's mother, Cher, filed for a conservatorship over Allman due to his ongoing substance abuse issues. Prior to the hearing on January 5, 2024, Allman withdrew his divorce filing and retained attorneys to contest the conservatorship. He attended the hearing with his attorneys and successfully argued to postpone the hearing due to Cher's attorneys’ failure to provide proper notice. Cher's motion for the temporary conservatorship was denied on January 30, 2024. She filed a second request for conservatorship in April 2026.

On Saturday, June 14, 2025, Allman was taken to a hospital in Joshua Tree, California after suffering a drug overdose.

== Legal issues ==
On Friday, February 27, 2026, Allman was arrested and charged with two counts of trespassing, simple assault, and disorderly conduct. The incident took place at St. Paul's School, a co-educational boarding school in Concord, New Hampshire. On Sunday, March 1, 2026, Allman was arrested for the second time in three days after breaking into a residential home in Windham, New Hampshire, and was charged with burglary, two counts of criminal mischief and breach of bail. During his arraignment for the second arrest at Salem District Court on March 2, 2026, Allman was ordered to remain held in preventive detention, and he was incarcerated at the Rockingham House of Corrections in Brentwood, New Hampshire. He was transferred to New Hampshire State Hospital in Concord, New Hampshire, where he currently remains. His next court hearing is scheduled for September in Salem, New Hampshire.

== Discography ==
With Deadsy

- Demo (1995)
- Deadsy (1996)
- Commencement (1999, unreleased version)
- Commencement (2002)
- Phantasmagore (2006)
- Subterfugue (TBA)

With Elijah Blue and the Trapezoids

Since starting Elijah Blue and the Trapezoids, Allman released a few demos on his Myspace, but no news of an album had surfaced since 2008.

- "Haunted" (4:00)
- "White Knuckle Angel Face" (3:40)
- "Long Way Down" (3:21)

As featured musician

- Orgy – Candyass (1998, additional vocals and keyboards on "Revival")
- with Cher – "Crimson & Clover" (1999)
- Sugar Ray – 14:59 (1999, additional vocals on "Personal Space Invader")
- Coal Chamber – Chamber Music (1999, additional vocals and keyboards on "Shock the Monkey", additional vocals on "My Mercy")
- Orgy – Vapor Transmission (2000, additional vocals on "The Spectrum")
- "What's Going On" (2001, additional vocals on "What's Going On (Fred Durst's Reality Check Mix)")
- The Family Values Tour 2001 (2001, appears live on the Static-X song "Push It")
- Thirty Seconds to Mars – 30 Seconds to Mars (2002, plays guitar and bass on "Welcome to the Universe")
- Korn – Korn Kovers (2005, additional vocals on "Love My Way")
- Mickey Avalon – Loaded (2012, additional vocals on "Mickey's Girl", recorded in 2009)
