= Josh Abraham =

American record producer

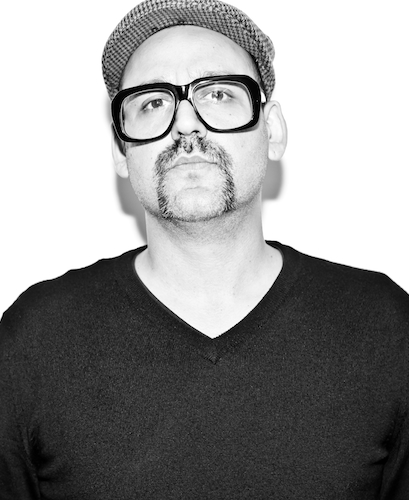
- Abraham in 2011

Background information
- Born: January 12, 1973 (age 53); Los Angeles, California, U.S.
- Genres: Pop; rock
- Occupations: Music executive; record producer; songwriter
- Years active: 1995–present
- Website: pulserecordings.com

Josh Abraham (born January 12, 1973) is an American record producer, songwriter, and music executive. He has worked with artists including P!nk, Thirty Seconds to Mars, Kelly Clarkson, Shakira, Weezer, Linkin Park, Velvet Revolver, Carly Rae Jepsen, Adam Lambert, Alkaline Trio, and Slayer.

His career began in the recording studio in the mid-1990s, as a self-taught musician, producer, mixer, and engineer. The first album he produced for a major label was Deadsy's self-titled debut album in 1997. As a client of The Firm, Inc. he became A&R and Staff Producer, leading to a similar role at Virgin Records where he teamed up with the likes of Thirty Seconds to Mars and Courtney Love.

== Pulse Recording ==
In 2004, Abraham formed Pulse Recording, after purchasing the property which operated as Soundcastle Recording Studios for more than 25 years. Designed in 1967 by influential mid-century modern architect Carl Maston, the Pulse Recording headquarters consists of two redwood block and glass buildings on a one-acre lot, housing two recording studios and an office space. The building has received the prestigious American Institute of Architects award for quality of construction and design. Notable artists that have recorded on the property since its inception include: U2, Madonna, Paul McCartney, Beach Boys, Bruce Springsteen, Tupac Shakur, Billy Joel, Beastie Boys, Red Hot Chili Peppers, Dr. Dre, Herbie Hancock, and Mary J. Blige.

He went on to create Pulse Management and Songs of Pulse, both operating under the Pulse Recording umbrella with partner Scott Cutler. Since 2010, the company's client roster has co-written Katy Perry's "Teenage Dream", "California Gurls", "Last Friday Night (T.G.I.F.)" and "Part of Me", Taio Cruz's "Dynamite" Phillip Phillips' "Home" and Neon Trees' "Animal" and "Everybody Talks". Pulse Recording now operates two Recording studios, one based at its headquarters in Los Angeles, and one based in Burbank, California. In 2012, the company established a partnership with Creative Nation, the Nashville-based music management and publishing company owned by songwriter Luke Laird and his wife Beth Laird.

== Select songwriting discography ==
| Year | Artist | Album | Song | Co-written with |
|---|---|---|---|---|
| 2015 | Justin Bieber | Purpose (Deluxe) | "Been You" | Justin Bieber, Jason Boyd, Brandon Green, Oliver Goldstein, Saul Alexander Castillo Vasquez |
| 2015 | Justin Bieber | Purpose (Deluxe) | "Get Used To It" | Justin Bieber, Jason Boyd, Brandon Green, Josh Gudwin, Saul Alexander Castillo Vasquez, Ely Weisfield |
| 2015 | Flo Rida | My House (EP) | "Here It Is" featuring Chris Brown | Tramar Dillard, Alexander Izquierdo, Justin Franks, Oliver Goldstein, Teemu Brunila, Thomas Troelsen, Dillard |
| 2013 | Ciara | Ciara | "Overdose" | Ciara, Oliver Goldstein, Ali Tamposi, Olivia Waithe |
| 2012 | Carly Rae Jepsen | Kiss | "Turn Me Up" | Carly Rae Jepsen, Oliver Goldstein, Bonnie McKee, Kevin Maher |
| 2012 | Kelly Clarkson | Non-album single | "Get Up (A Cowboys Anthem)" | Kelly Clarkson, Oliver Goldstein, Ryan Williams |
| 2012 | Adam Lambert | Trespassing | "Cuckoo" | Adam Lambert, Oliver Goldstein, Bonnie McKee, Anne Preven |
| 2012 | Adam Lambert | Trespassing | "Naked Love" | Benjamin Levin, Ammar Malik, Oliver Goldstein, Dan Omelio |
| 2012 | Adam Lambert | Trespassing | "Chokehold" | Adam Lambert, Oliver Goldstein, Bonnie McKee |
| 2012 | Adam Lambert | Trespassing | "Nirvana" | Adam Lambert, Oliver Goldstein, Stephen Wrabel |
| 2011 | Kelly Clarkson | Stronger | "You Love Me" | Kelly Clarkson, Oliver Goldstein |
| 2011 | Kelly Clarkson | Stronger | ""Hello" (Kelly Clarkson song)" | Kelly Clarkson, Bonnie McKee, Oliver Goldstein |
| 2011 | Kelly Clarkson | Stronger | "Alone" | Oliver Goldstein, Bonnie McKee, Ryan Williams |
| 2011 | Kelly Clarkson | Stronger | "You Can't Win" | Kelly Clarkson, Oliver Goldstein, Felix Bloxsom |
| 2011 | Black Veil Brides | Set The World on Fire | "New Religion" | Andy Biersack, Jacob Pitts, Ashley Purdy |
| 2011 | Black Veil Brides | Set The World on Fire | "Set The World on Fire" | Andy Biersack, Jacob Pitts, Ashley Purdy |
| 2011 | Black Veil Brides | Set The World on Fire | "Fallen Angels" | Andy Biersack, Jeremy Furguson, Ashley Purdy |
| 2011 | Black Veil Brides | Set The World on Fire | "Ritual" | Anne Preven, Andy Biersack, Jacob Pitts, Ashley Purdy |
| 2010 | Fefe Dobson | Joy | "Thanks For Nothing" | Fefe Dobson, Bonnie McKee |
| 2010 | Fefe Dobson | Joy | "Let's Go (Turn It Up)" | Fefe Dobson, Bonnie McKee, Oliver Goldstein |
| 2010 | Travie McCoy | Lazarus | "After Midnight" | Travie McCoy, Evan Bogart, Oliver Goldstein |
| 2009 | Uncle Kracker | Happy Hour | "Livin' The Dream" | Matthew Shafer, Oliver Goldstein, David Coverdale, Bernie Marsden |
| 2009 | Sugar Ray | Music for Cougars | "Closer" | Mark McGrath, Oliver Goldstein |

== Select production discography ==
| Year | Artist | Album | Details |
|---|---|---|---|
| 2015 | Justin Bieber | Purpose (Deluxe) | Producer, Songwriter |
| 2015 | Flo Rida | My House (EP) | Producer |
| 2014 | Lea Michele | Louder | Producer |
| 2013 | Ciara | Ciara | Producer |
| 2013 | Bonnie McKee | American Girl | Producer |
| 2012 | Adam Lambert | Trespassing | Producer |
| 2012 | Carly Rae Jepsen | Kiss | Producer |
| 2011 | Kelly Clarkson | Stronger | Producer |
| 2011 | Black Veil Brides | Set The World on Fire | Producer |
| 2010 | Shakira | Sale el Sol | Producer |
| 2010 | Fefe Dobson | Joy | Producer |
| 2010 | Travie McCoy | Lazarus | Producer, Musician |
| 2010 | Automatic Loveletter | Truth Or Dare | Producer |
| 2009 | Sugar Ray | Music for Cougars | Producer |
| 2009 | Elliott Yamin | Fight For Love | Producer |
| 2008 | From First To Last | From First To Last | Producer |
| 2008 | Alkaline Trio | Agony and Irony | Producer |
| 2008 | Filter | Anthems for the Damned | Producer, Musician |
| 2008 | Rev Theory | Light It Up | Producer |
| 2007 | Elliott Yamin | Elliott Yamin | Producer, Musician |
| 2006 | P!nk | I'm Not Dead | Producer, Engineer |
| 2006 | Slayer | Christ Illusion | Producer, Mixing |
| 2006 | The Panic Channel | (ONe) | Producer |
| 2006 | Atreyu | A Death-Grip on Yesterday | Producer |
| 2006 | The Summer Obsession | This Is Where You Belong | Producer |
| 2006 | Men, Women & Children | Men, Women & Children | Producer |
| 2005 | Weezer | Make Believe | Mixing |
| 2005 | Thirty Seconds to Mars | A Beautiful Lie | Producer |
| 2005 | Egypt Central | Egypt Central | Producer |
| 2005 | Unwritten Law | Here's to the Mourning | Producer |
| 2005 | 10 Years | The Autumn Effect | Producer |
| 2004 | Velvet Revolver | Contraband | Producer |
| 2004 | Courtney Love | America's Sweetheart | Producer |
2003
| 2003 | InMe | White Butterfly | Producer, Mixer |
| 2003 | Staind | 14 Shades of Grey | Producer, Mixing, Programming, Keyboards, String Arrangements |
| 2003 | Michelle Branch | Hotel Paper | Producer, Mixing, Programming, Keyboards |
| 2003 | Static-X | Shadow Zone | Producer |
| 2003 | Ima Robot | Ima Robot | Producer, Mixing |
| 2003 | Campfire Girls | Tell Them Hi | Producer, Mixing |
| 2002 | Linkin Park | Reanimation | Producer |
| 2002 | Unwritten Law | Elva | Producer, Mixing |
| 2002 | Shihad | Pacifier | Producer, A&R |
| 2001 | Staind | Break the Cycle | Producer, Engineer, Programming |
| 2001 | Dope | Life | Producer, Engineer |
| 2001 | theStart | Shakedown! | Producer |
| 2000 | Limp Bizkit | Chocolate Starfish and the Hot Dog Flavored Water | Producer |
| 2000 | Orgy | Vapor Transmission | Producer, Engineer, Programming, Musician |
| 1999 | Crazy Town | The Gift of Game | Producer, Mixing, Engineer, Programming |
| 1999 | Coal Chamber | Chamber Music | Producer, Programming, Musician |
| 1999 | Danzig | 6:66 Satan's Child | Engineer |
| 1999 | Deadsy | Commencement | Producer, Mixing, Engineer, Programming |
| 1998 | Orgy | Candyass | Producer, Engineer, Programming, Musician |

== Awards and nominations ==
Latin Grammy Awards

- 2011 – Album of the Year ("Sale el Sol") (Nominated)
