= Into Another (band) =

American rock band

- Into Another in 1995

Background information
- Origin: New York City, U.S.
- Genres: Post-hardcore; alternative metal; alternative rock; grunge
- Years active: 1990–1996; 2012–present
- Labels: Revelation; Hollywood
- Members: Richie Birkenhead; Drew Thomas; Peter Moses; Brian Balchack; Reid Black
- Past members: Tony Bono
- Website: intoanother.com

Into Another is an American rock band formed in 1990 in New York City. The original lineup consisted of vocalist Richie Birkenhead (formerly of Underdog and Youth of Today), drummer Drew Thomas (formerly of Bold), bassist Tony Bono (formerly of Whiplash) and guitarist Peter Moses. Into Another performed their first show at New York's Pyramid Club, supporting White Zombie. Their song "T.A.I.L." hit No. 39 on the U.S. Billboard Mainstream Rock Tracks chart in 1996. The band broke up later that year due to intra-band tensions and a deteriorated relationship with Hollywood Records. Bassist Tony Bono died in May 2002.

In 2012, Into Another reunited for the Revelation Records 25th Anniversary shows at The Glasshouse in Pomona, California. Original members Birkenhead, Moses Thomas were joined by guitarist Brian Balchack (Ignite) and bassist Reid Black (Innaway).

== Discography ==
=== Albums ===
- Into Another (1991, Revelation Records)
- Ignaurus (1994, Revelation Records)
- Seemless (1995, Hollywood Records)
- Soul Control (Unreleased, Hollywood Records)

=== Other ===
- Creepy Eepy EP (1992, Revelation Records)
- "Poison Fingers" single (1995, Revelation Records)
- "T.A.I.L." single (1996, Hollywood Records)
- Omens EP (2015, Ghost Ship Records)
