= Blonde Electra =

British pop duo

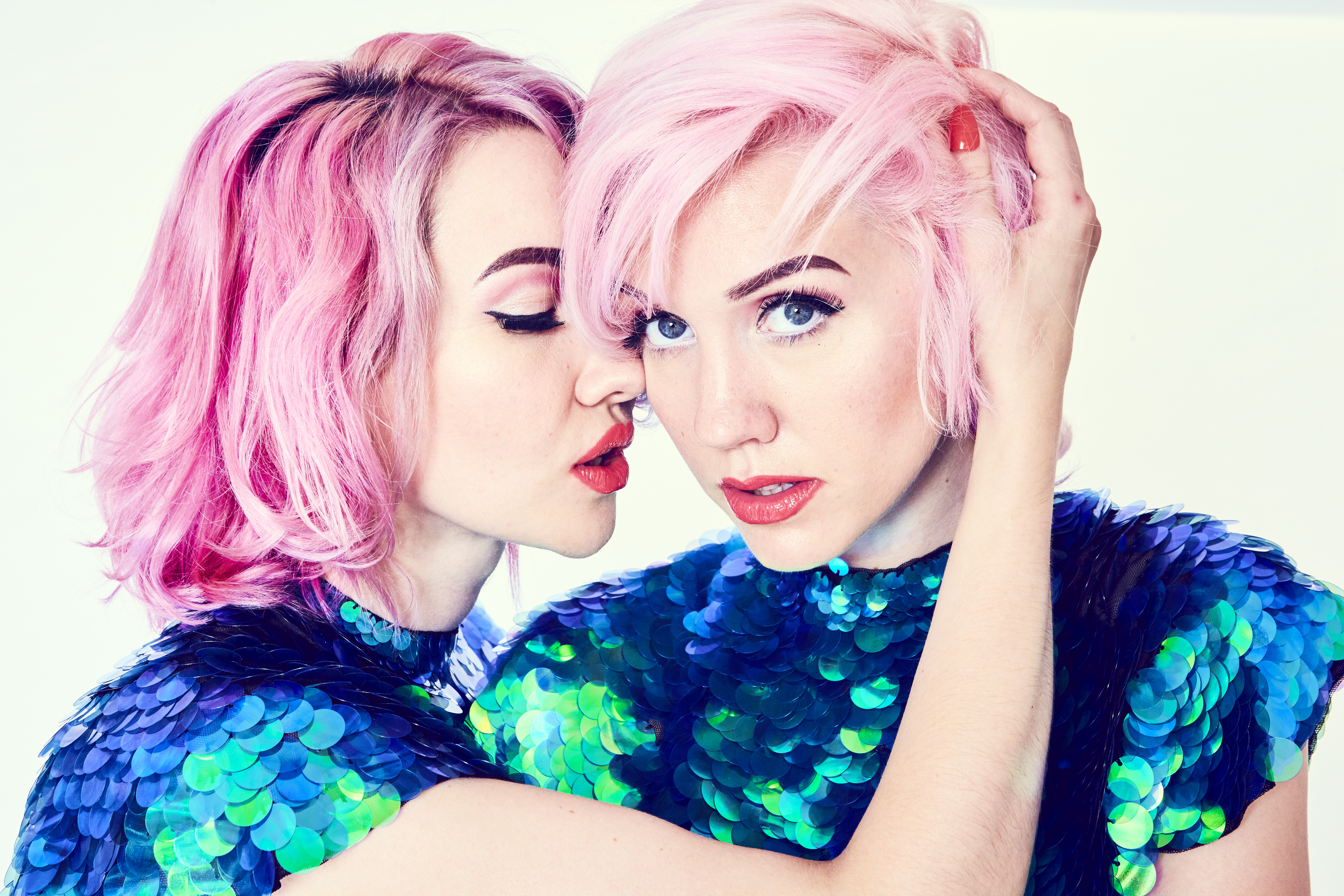
- Ruby and Jazzy King in 2017

Background information
- Origin: London, England
- Genres: Electropop, hip hop
- Years active: 2013–present
- Members: Jazzy King; Ruby King

Blonde Electra (formerly Blonde Electric) are a British pop duo consisting of British-German sisters Jasmina "Jazzy" King (born 19 February 1990) and Natalia "Ruby" King (born 7 May 1992). They formed the group in 2013 in Düsseldorf, Germany, after leaving their previous band King.

The two sisters have been making music from an early age and have worked as songwriters in Europe and the United States. They are best known for their performances in the eleventh series of The X Factor UK in the 'Group' category, mentored by Louis Walsh. The duo reached the finals and took part in the first live show. They have lived in London since 2014.

On 6 February 2017 they registered the private limited UK company 'Toy Machine Limited' at Companies House, with both sisters listed as the directors. The company has been dissolved in 2020.

== Early life ==
The parents of the two sisters, British-born Michael Jaffray King and his German wife Irmgard (also known as Joanna), left India in 1991 and travelled with their children as Christian missionaries in a caravan through Europe and the United States. They moved about 80 times and lived mostly under poor circumstances, especially during their nine-year stay in Ukraine, which they described as living in a ghetto without running water or a shower. All children were home-schooled and grew up under their father's strict rules without being allowed toys or to watch TV or listen to popular music.

== Musical career ==
=== King Family ===
Jazzy and Ruby King started to sing on the streets at an age of one or two at their father's instigation. He later formed with his five oldest children the Christian band The King Family and they toured through the world performing religious music as street musicians, in clubs, churches, schools and prisons and on TV shows. In 1998 they were offered a $4 million record deal by Word Records/Warner Music Group (US) which was refused by their father because of the young age of the children.

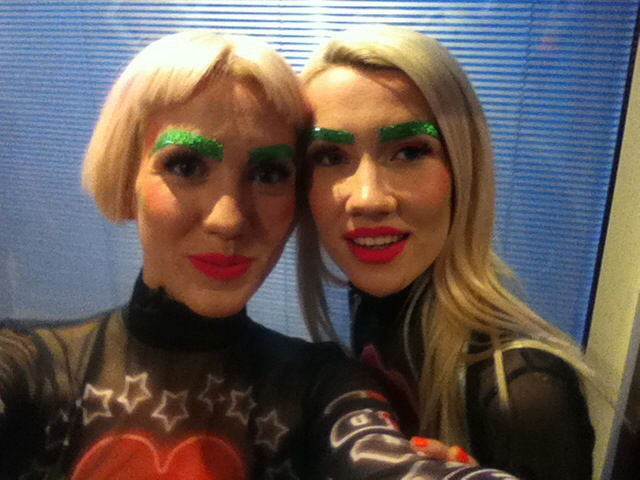
Blonde Electra singers Jazzy and Ruby King in their stage outfits at the first Live Show of X Factor UK, 11 October 2014

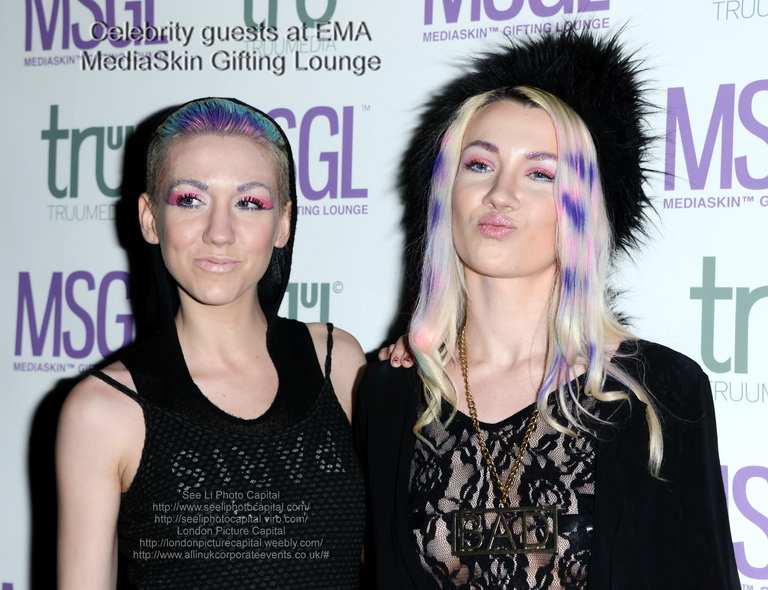
Jazzy and Ruby King at the EMA MediaSkin Gifting Lounge in London, 6 November 2014

When Jazzy and Ruby King turned 15 and 13, now living in Slovakia, they left their family to stay on their own and to sing in a night club, after their oldest brother Michael had already quit the band in 2003. The five siblings reunited in 2006 and started outside their father's control the band King Family, supported by the German producer Dieter Falk. They were soon given a record deal by EMI and published two singles and one album. In 2009 the band was invited to Nashville, Tennessee by Doc McGhee (the manager of Kiss and Bon Jovi) and the siblings decided to emigrate to the United States. They parted ways with EMI and renamed their band to King. They moved from a camping ground in Cologne to Los Angeles in June 2009. At the end of 2013, King released the music video "B.O.M.B.", directed by Nicholaus Goossen, in which Jazzy and Ruby King featured.

=== The X Factor ===
After differences with their siblings Jazzy and Ruby King left the band King and started their own group called Blonde Electric. They were based in Düsseldorf, Germany, at that time and decided to move to England and audition for The X Factor after they heard that Simon Cowell had been back on the judging panel. They were earning their living with nannying and waitressing jobs and increased their initial combined assets of about only £150 to over £10,000 in only a few months.

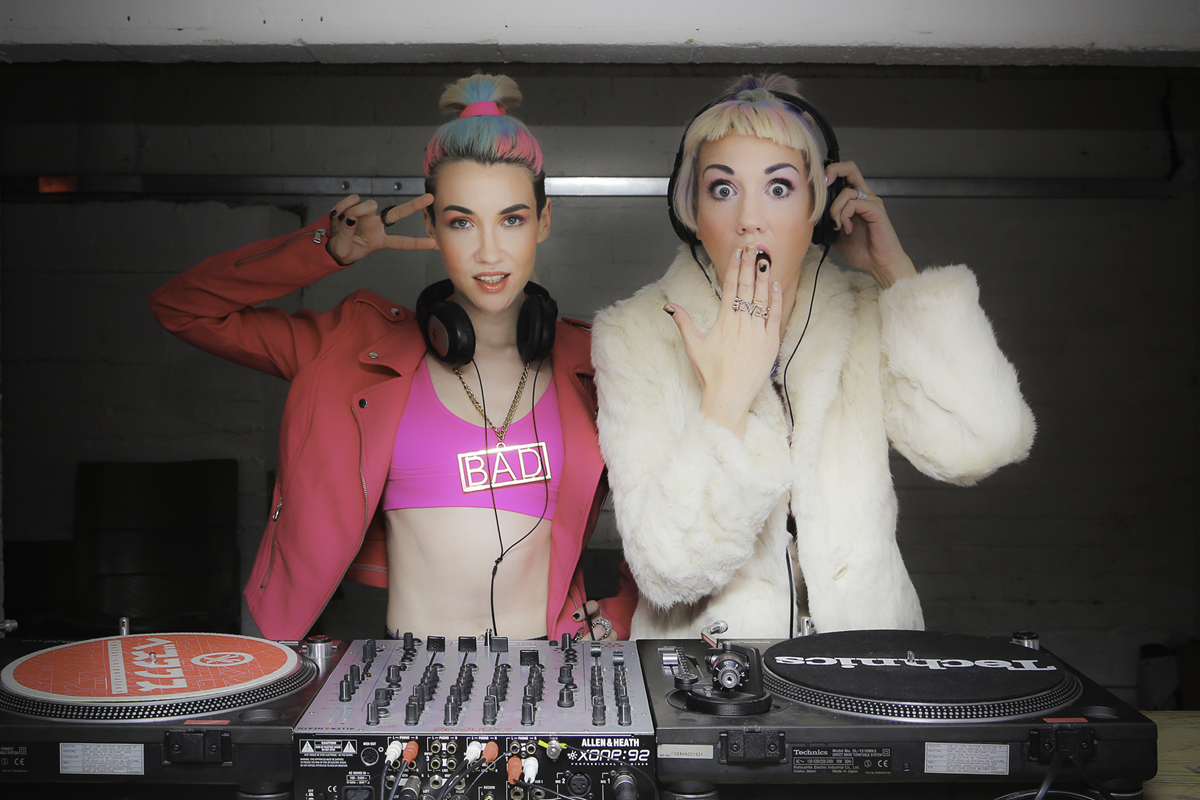
Blonde Electra in 2014

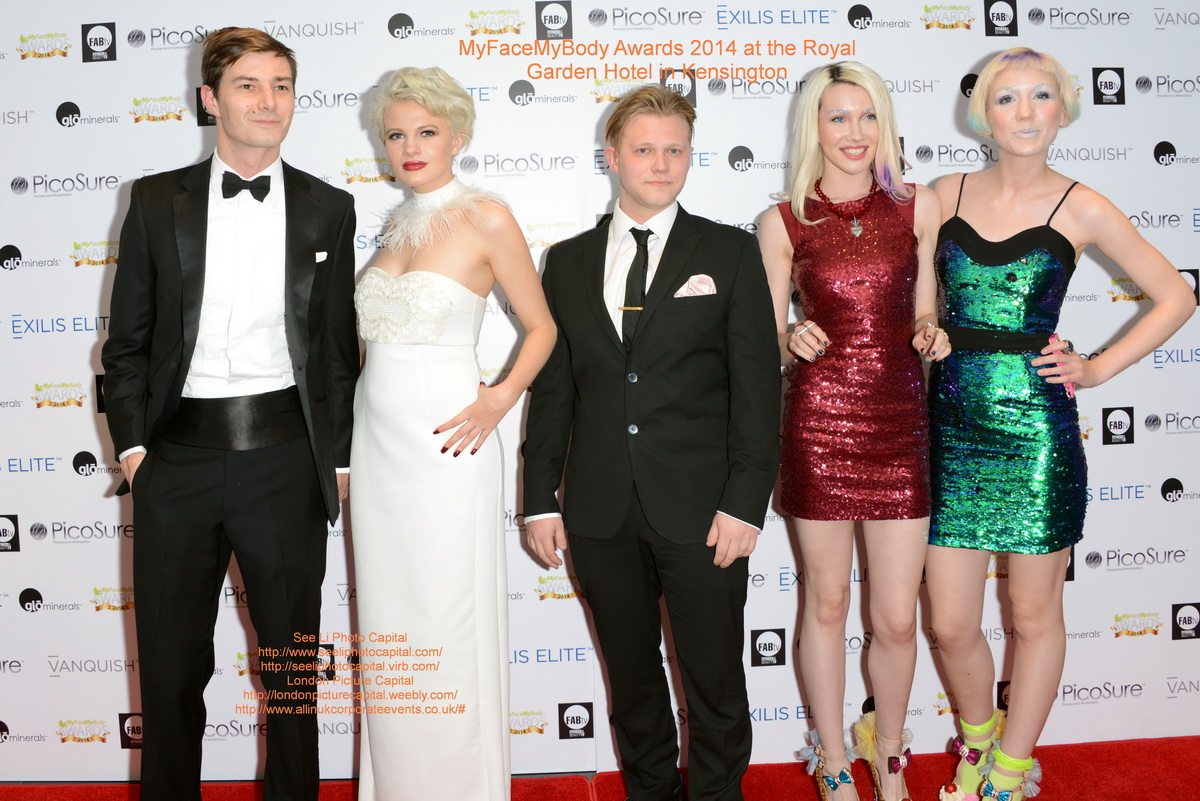
Ruby and Jazzy King (far right) at the MyFaceMyBody Awards 2014

Blonde Electra were the first auditionees to be shown in the 2014 series. They performed the song "Do It like a Dude"by Jessie J and were accepted to go on with three 'yes' votes from Cowell, Louis Walsh and Mel B and one 'no' vote from Cheryl. At the bootcamp the group sang "I Love Rock and Roll" by Joan Jett and at the judges' houses, which took place in Bermuda, they performed "Gold Digger" by Kanye West. Walsh, their mentor, selected them as the first act to perform in the live shows, after which Jazzy King told the show host that they needed to succeed because they did not have "a plan B" and they "don't function in the outside world, this is all we can do.".

During their time on The X Factor, the group decided to change their name from Blonde Electric to Blonde Electra shortly before the live shows because the old name was too descriptive. According to Jazzy King the new name should "represent who we are and what we stand for. When we think of Blonde Electra, we imagine a strong, independent woman that doesn't take no for an answer".

Although the duo did not advance to the second week, the choreography (with X Factor creative director Brian Friedman) and fashion style of their live performance stood out. Head stylist Gemma Sheppard, responsible for the outfits, called them the most fearless with fashion, willing to push boundaries and having a vision. At The X Factor finals, the two sisters aroused controversial attention when they kissed each other on stage during their performance of the opening number with the other contestants.

==== Performances during the show ====
The X Factor performances and results (2014)
Episode	Theme	Song	Result
First audition	Free choice	Do It like a Dude - Jessie J	Through to bootcamp
Bootcamp	Free choice	I Love Rock and Roll - Joan Jett	Through to judges' houses
Judges' houses	Free choice	Gold Digger - Kanye West	Through to live shows
Live show 1	Number ones	Kids in America - Kim Wilde	Eliminated (16th)

== Family connections ==
While participating in The X Factor, the sisters revealed in interviews that they are related to then Chancellor George Osborne, whose father is a cousin of their father. Their paternal grandmother Helen Queenie Horn married Rodney Stewart King, the son of Lt. Col. Stewart William King, an officer in the British Indian Army. Her sister Mary Horn married as her second husband Sir George Francis Osborne, the grandfather of George Osborne.

Their sister Marieangela King married on 1 December 2013 the musician and artist Elijah Blue Allman, the son of singer and actress Cher.

== Filmography ==
Year	Title	Type	Role	Notes
2009	Goodbye Deutschland! Die Auswanderer	German TV series	Themselves (as part of the band King Family)	Participant
2012, 2014	The X Factor	TV	Themselves (as part of group Blonde Electra)	Contestant

== Discography ==
=== Singles ===
Year	Title	Peak chart positions		Album	Certification
Year	Title	UK	IRE	Album	Certification
2017	"Radio"	—	—	Pop Tart	
2017	"Let's Touch"	—	—	Pop Tart	
"—" denotes single that did not chart or was not released.
