= Alec Puro =

American musician (born 1975)

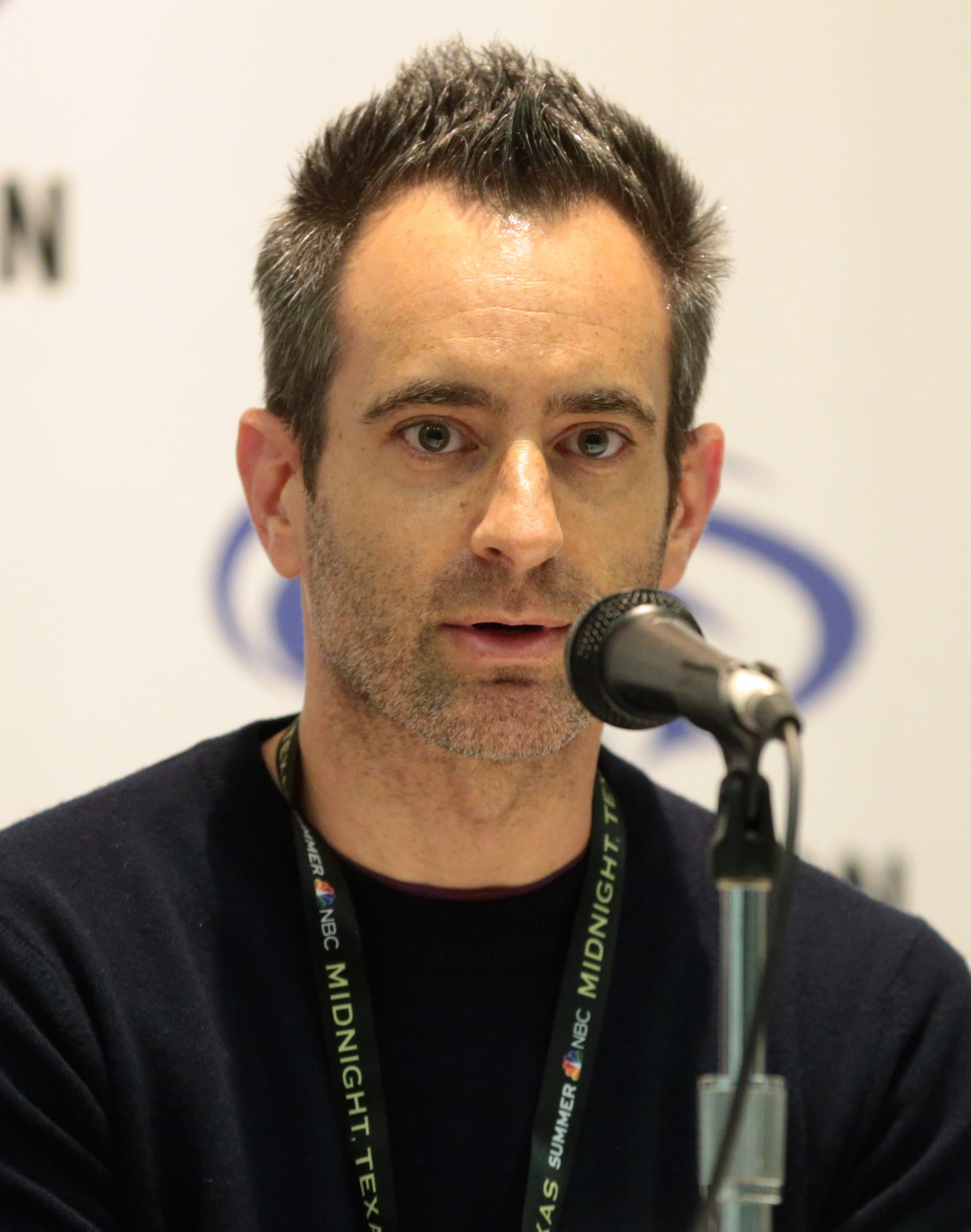
- Puro in 2017
- Born: April 25, 1975 (age 51); Santa Monica, California, U.S.
- Occupations: Musician; songwriter; composer
- Years active: 1995–present
- Spouse: Marla Sokoloff (m. 2009)
- Children: 3
- Musical career
- Instruments: Drums; keyboards; piano

Alec Puro (born April 25, 1975), also known as Alec Püre, is an American drummer, songwriter and composer. As well as being the drummer for Deadsy, Puro has composed music for numerous television shows and films.

== Career ==
Puro is best known for scoring the drama series The Fosters and Black Summer, as well as several films including The Art of Getting By (2011), starring Freddie Highmore, and Higher Ground (2011), directed by Vera Farmiga. A veteran of the indie film world, he composed the music for the comedy All Nighter (2017), starring Emile Hirsch and J.K. Simmons, and A Happening of Monumental Proportions (2017), Judy Greer's directorial debut.

In 1996, Puro formed the rock band Deadsy with longtime friend Elijah Blue Allman and Renn Hawkey. The band's style is a synthesis of glam, goth and synth-rock with science fiction. After their first album was released, the band embarked upon several world tours, opening for bands such as Linkin Park and Stone Temple Pilots. During his time with Deadsy, Puro also began composing music for various films and television shows. Since 2007, Puro's film work has been a regular fixture at some of the world's most integral film festivals, from SXSW to Cannes to the Tribeca Film Festival.

Puro founded Gramoscope Music in 2006. Some projects they have created music for include the new theme for Real Time with Bill Maher, American Horror Story, So You Think You Can Dance, Running Wild with Bear Grylls, Wicked Tuna, Glee, and Burn Notice.

== Personal life ==
Puro has been married to actress Marla Sokoloff since 2009. Puro and Sokoloff have three daughters.

== Filmography ==
=== Film ===
Year	Title	Notes
2022	Blade of the 47 Ronin	Composer
2022	Rosé All Day	Composer
2021	The Gateway	Composer
2020	DieHard Is Back	Composer
2020	Home But Not Alone	Composer
2018	Pimp	Composer
2018	Eyes of Faith	Composer
2017	All Nighter	Composer
2017	A Happening of Monumental Proportions	Composer
2016	Lost in the Pacific	Composer
2016	Pandemic	Composer
2015	Ashby	Composer
2014	Mall	Composer
2014	The Scribbler	Composer
2014	Mantervention	Composer
2014	Murder 101	Composer
2012	Kill 'Em All	Composer
2012	Dog Eat Dog	Composer
2012	What to Expect When You're Expecting	Additional music
2012	The First Time	Composer
2011	Like Water	Composer
2011	The Chateau Meroux	Composer
2011	A Warrior's Heart	Composer
2011	Kevin	Composer
2011	Higher Ground	Composer and Arranger
2011	The Art of Getting By	Composer
2011	Joint Body	Composer
2011	Tupac Shakur: Thug Angel 2	Additional music
2011	We Are the Hartmans	Composer
2010	Starting at the Finish Line: The Coach Buehler Story	Composer
2013	Growth	Opening titles theme
2010	The Street Stops Here	Composer
2009	The Carter	Composer
2009	Q: The Man	Composer
2009	Concrete Jungle	Composer
2008	The Coverup	Composer
2008	Kill the Day	Composer
2007	Living with Lew	Composer
2007	The Good Night	Composer
2006	Analog Days	Composer
2006	Rising Son: The Legend of Skateboarder Christian Hosoi	Composer
2001	Turbulence 3: Heavy Metal	Writer, "Razor Electric"
1995	An Eviction Notice	Composer

=== Television ===
Year	Title	Notes
2022	Wicked Tuna: Outer Banks Showdown	Composer
2021	The Crew	Music by
2020-2022	The Mighty Ones	Composer
2019-2021	Black Summer	Composer
2018	The Gymkhana Files	Composer
2018	Cult and Extreme Belief	Composer
2018	Staties (ABC)	Composer
2017	Real Time with Bill Maher	Arranger and producer, main titles theme
2016–2017	Sweet/Vicious	Composer
2017	Leah Remini: Scientology and the Aftermath	Additional Music
2013–2016	The Fosters	Composer
2016	American Horror Story	Additional music
2012–2021	Wicked Tuna	Main titles theme / Music by
2016	Botched by Nature	Main titles theme / Music by
2016	Botched: Post-Op	Main titles theme / Music by
2014–2021	Botched	Main titles theme / Music by
2014–2021	Wicked Tuna: North vs. South	Main titles theme / Music by
2015	Airplane Repo	Main titles theme / Music by
2015	So You Think You Can Dance	Additional music
2015	Knock Knock Live	Main titles theme / Music by
2015	Somebody's Gotta Do It	Music by
2013–2015	My Cat from Hell	Main titles theme
2014	Manhattan Love Story	Composer
2014	Wahlburgers	Additional music
2014	Running Wild with Bear Grylls	Composer
2014	Every Street United	Main titles theme / Music by
2014	Static	Main titles theme / Music by
2012–2014	Reluctantly Healthy	Main titles theme / Music by
2013	My Big Fat Revenge	Main titles theme / Music by
2013	Forever Young	Music by
2013	The Americans	Performer, "Mississippi Queen"
2012	Code 9	Main titles theme / Music by
2012	Shake It Up	Additional music
2012	Brand X with Russell Brand	Main titles theme
2010–2012	Glee	Additional music
2012	¡Q'Viva!: The Chosen	Main titles theme / Music by
2009–2012	Jersey Shore	Additional music
2009–2011	Burn Notice	Additional music
2010	The Millionaire Matchmaker	Additional music
2010	The Fairy Jobmother	Main titles theme / Music by
2010	What's Eating You	Music by
2010	If I Can Dream	Main titles theme / Music by
2010	Terriers	Additional music
2010	Dad Camp	Music by
2010	The OCD Project	Music by
2009	Jonas	Composer Select episodes
2008	Raising the Bar	Composer Pilot episode
2008	Imaginary Bitches	Composer
2007–2008	Rob & Big	Additional music
2007	Life of Ryan	Additional music
2007	Victoria Beckham: Coming to America	Music by
2007	Bam's Unholy Union	Additional music
1995–2007	Road Rules	Additional music
2005	Parco P.I.	Music by
2005	Minding the Store	Music by
2005	Over There	Original Songs
2005	Super Agent	Music by
2004	High School Reunion	Additional music
2003	Real World/Road Rules Challenge	Additional music
2002–2003	Robbery Homicide Division	Additional music
2001	Dismissed	Main titles theme / Music by
1992	Real World	Additional music

=== Video games ===
Year	Title	Notes
2021	WWE 2K22	Additional Music
2020	NBA 2K21	Additional music
2019	NBA 2K20	Additional music
2018	NBA 2K19	Additional music
2017	NBA 2K18	Additional music
2016	NBA 2K17	Additional music
2015	NBA 2K16	Additional music
2014	NBA 2K15	Additional music
2001	ATV Offroad Fury	Additional music
