= Seemless (Into Another album) =

Studio album by Into Another
- Released: September 12, 1995
- Recorded: London Bridge Studios, Seattle, WA; Shelter Island Studios and Sorcerer Sound, NY
- Genre: Post-hardcore
- Label: Hollywood Records
- Producer: Rick Parashar

Into Another chronology
Ignaurus (1994)	Seemless (1995)

Seemless is Into Another's third full-length album, released on September 12, 1995 on Hollywood Records.

== Background and recording ==
The band recorded the album at Seattle's London Bridge Studios in Seattle, WA, with producer Rick Parashar who Richie Birkenhead described as "the most down to earth, unpretentious, coolest guy in the world." The band spent three weeks recording the album. In an interview, Birkenhead said, "There are a few layers, like on some songs we have an acoustic guitars, or on "Regarding Earthlings" there is a tamboura way back in the mix. Also on the song "May I", I play a Wurlitzer."

== Release and reception ==
Professional ratings
Review scores
Source	Rating
AllMusic	3/5 stars
Kerrang!	4/5 stars

The opening track on the album, "Mutate Me," was released as a music video, directed by Fred Stuhr. The second single, "T.A.I.L." was also released as a video, directed by Noah Bogen. The track fared well on radio, climbing to #39 on the Billboard Single chart in 1996.

Ultimately the album failed to make an impact on the charts, with the band blaming the label for "terrible distribution and promotion." The album is currently unavailable in the iTunes Music Store, which Birkenhead blames on Hollywood Records, saying the label "deliberately shelved and deleted stuff from catalogs." As of February 2, 2024, the album is now available on Spotify, Apple Music, YouTube Music, and more.

== Track listing ==
No.	Title	Length
1.	"Mutate Me"	3:21
2.	"Locksmiths & Lawyers"	2:51
3.	"T.A.I.L."	4:22
4.	"Getting Nowhere"	3:48
5.	"Seemless"	2:46
6.	"Actual Size"	4:05
7.	"For a Wounded Wren"	4:07
8.	"After Birth"	3:20
9.	"Regarding Earthlings"	4:05
10.	"May I"	3:31
11.	"The Way Down"	4:47
12.	"Anne Dreud's Last Entry (2024 reissue bonus track)"	3:16
13.	"Allthewayrider (2024 reissue bonus track)"	3:17
Total length:		47:36

== Personnel ==
Into Another

- Richie Birkenhead - vocals, Wurlitzer organ
- Peter Moses – guitars
- Tony Bono – bass
- Drew Thomas – drums, congas

Additional musicians

- Victor Axelrod - Hammond B3 organ

Production and recording

- Rick Parashar - Engineer, Mixing, Producer
- John Plum - Engineer
- Ray Martin - Engineer
- Greg Griffith - Assistant Engineer
- George Marino - Mastering
- Geoff Ott - Assistant Engineer
