= Parco P.I. =

Television series

Parco P.I. is a reality television program that aired on Court TV for two seasons and 26 episodes. The series is about the cases of New York City-based private investigator Vincent "Vinny" Parco, his daughter Dani Parco, his twin sons Chris Parco and Vincent Parco Jr. and a number of the female investigators who work for the firm. Parco was already well-known for being hired to use attractive women who would tempt husbands whose wives suspected them of infidelity.

Its first episode aired on August 28, 2005, and the final episode was aired on November 25, 2006. Once Time-Warner moved forward with purchasing the remaining 50% of Court TV, owned by Liberty Media Corp. in 2006, the reality show was cancelled. This was due in part to the revamping of the network, and their plan of moving away from 'reality' shows to focus on more unscripted content. This also prompted the network's name change from Court TV to TruTV as well as the roll out of their new slogan; "Not Reality. Actuality". In 2012, the New York Daily News called the series 'a failed reality show'. In 2025, in a now-viral video, an intoxicated woman berates an Uber driver while suggesting that she works for his firm.

== Advertising ==
The show gained considerable attention before its second-season premiere for its viral marketing using billboards that posed as a letter from a wife named "Emily" to her unfaithful husband "Steven". In the letter, "Emily" reveals that she knows about Steven's infidelity and implies that she will file for divorce from him. This gained the attention of blogs and mainstream media, which questioned the billboards' legitimacy and speculated as to what the billboards were really about. In spite of the ruse, the ploy to gain notoriety for the show's 2nd season was a success. The campaign as a whole was covered by over 200 news sources on-air, online and in print. Within just a few days Emily's "14 Days of Wrath" blog had received over a million hits and she was getting requests for media appearances at a national level.

== See also ==
- Court TV
- TruTV
- Private investigator
- Reality television
- Viral marketing
