= Analog Days =

- Directed by: Mike Ott
- Written by: Mike Ott
- Produced by: Jenifer Shahin
- Starring: Chad Cunningham; Ivy Khan; Granger Green; Tinnes, Brett
- Cinematography: Jason Joel Harris; Jay Keitel
- Edited by: Lan Farnham
- Music by: Derek Fudesco
- Release date: June 24, 2006
- Running time: 90 minutes
- Country: United States
- Language: English

Analog Days is a 2006 film directed and written by Mike Ott. It premiered at the 2006 Los Angeles Film Festival. It was also invited to screen at the Cinequest Film Festival in San Jose, California, The Viennale Film Festival in Vienna, Austria and Film Pop Film Festival in Montreal, Quebec, Canada, in October 2006.

== Plot ==
The film is coming-of-age story, following a group of young people in Newhall, California.

== Cast ==
- Chad Cunningham - Lloyd
- Ivy Khan - Tammy
- Granger Green - Molly
- Brett L. Tinnes - Jordan
- Rhyan Johnsen - Fenster
- Shaughn Buccholz - Derek
- Jonathon Burbridge - Lawler
- Nathan Rodriguez - Peter
- Jackie Buscarino - Melanie
- Tyler Nelson - Dameco
- Charles Pasternak - Charles
- David Nordstrom - Troy
- Jon Brotherton - Butler
- Ryan Dillion - Alex
