= Michael Allman =

American musician (born 1966)

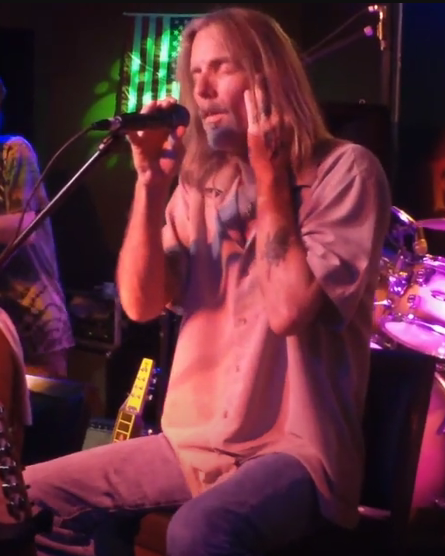
- Allman performing in 2012

Background information
- Born: Michael Hendrick; July 3, 1966 (age 59); Daytona Beach, Florida
- Genres: Southern rock
- Instrument: Vocals
- Member of: Michael Allman Band

Michael Sean Allman (born Michael Hendrick; 3 July 1966) is an American musician and leader of the southern rock Michael Allman Band.

== Early life ==
Allman was born to Mary Lynn Sutton and musician Gregg Allman on 3 July 1966 in Daytona Beach, Florida. He was given the surname Hendrick after his first stepfather, who his mother divorced when Allman was young. He believed he was the son of his second stepfather, Daniel Green. Green died in an airplane crash when Allman was six, which is when he learned the identity of his birth father. Gregg Allman was not aware of his son until Michael turned 12.

Allman attended a military academy at the age of 15, and after his mother was diagnosed with cancer, moved in with his father at the age of 17. He subsequently became involved in the music scene.

== Career ==
In the 1990s, Michael began an early incarnation of the Michael Allman Band. He became frustrated at his lack of success, believing his father's influence would quickly further his career. After dissolving the band, Allman worked as bartender, a sound technician, and a DJ.

In 2002, Allman was diagnosed with testicular cancer. He underwent a successful surgery to remove it. He gained a renewed interest in writing and recording music, and subsequently reformed the Michael Allman Band. He released his first album, Hard Labor Creek, in 2010, and performed a tour with a six-piece band. He released his second album, Blues Travels Fast, in 2020. He planned a tour to support the album, but it was cancelled due to the COVID-19 pandemic. He then opened a music store in New Port Richey, Florida. He plans to release his third album, Creature of Habit.

While on tour, Allman primarily plays music composed by his father's Allman Brothers Band, while also performing original material.
