= Forever Young (American TV series) =

American reality television series

- Genre: Reality
- Country of origin: United States
- Original language: English
- No. of seasons: 1
- No. of episodes: 6

Production
- Executive producers: Ashton Kutcher; J.D. Roth; Jason Goldberg; Todd A. Nelson
- Running time: 20 to 23 minutes (excluding commercials)
- Production companies: 3 Ball Productions; Katalyst Films

Original release
- Network: TV Land
- Release: April 3 – May 1, 2013

Forever Young is an American reality television series that premiered on TV Land on April 3, 2013, from Ashton Kutcher and Jason Goldberg's Katalyst (Punk'd, True Beauty), and 3 Ball Productions headed by executive producers J. D. Roth and Todd A. Nelson (The Biggest Loser, MasterChef).

== Premise ==
This reality series puts ten people in a house, where they live together with cameras capturing their every move. The twist is that the housemates are split into two groups – juniors and seniors – based on their age. The juniors are all under the age of 30 and the seniors are over 70. They are assigned various tasks meant to help them overcome the generation gap and form bonds. Through the challenges, which include teaching the seniors how to play beer pong and showing the juniors how to use a paper map, the groups hope to surmount their differences and become friends.

== Episodes ==
No.	Title	Original release date	U.S. viewers (millions)
1	"Bridging the Gap"	April 3, 2013	0.70
2	"The Hunt"	April 3, 2013	0.73
3	"Food Fight"	April 10, 2013	0.77
4	"Date Night"	April 17, 2013	0.66
5	"Party in Palm Springs"	April 24, 2013	0.59
6	"What Happens in Vegas"	May 1, 2013	0.52
