= Hyde School (Maine) =

Location
- 616 High Street; Bath, Maine 04530; United States; 43.904945°N 69.822927°W

Information
- Type: Private, college-preparatory boarding school
- Motto: Be The Best Possible You
- Religious affiliation: Nonsectarian
- Established: 1966; 60 years ago
- Founder: Joe Gauld
- NCES School ID: 00563551
- Head of School and President: Laura Gauld
- Teaching staff: 15.9 (on an FTE basis)
- Grades: 9–12; PG
- Gender: Co-educational
- Enrollment: 137 (2025–2026)
- Student to teacher ratio: 7.4
- Hours in school day: 6.6
- Campus size: 145 acres (59 ha)
- Campus type: Rural
- Colors: Blue and gold
- Athletics conference: New England Preparatory School Athletic Council
- Mascot: Wolfpack
- Tuition: Boarding tuition $68,300 Non-boarding tuition $31,500
- Website: www.hyde.edu

Hyde School is a private, co-educational, college-preparatory boarding school for grades 9–12 and postgraduate in Bath, Maine, United States. It was founded in 1966 by Joseph W. Gauld who wanted to "set up a school devoted to developing self-confidence and self-discipline."

== History ==
Hyde was founded in 1966 by Joe Gauld, who had previously worked for 13 years in public and private schools. Concerned by "sentimentalist attitude[s]" about child-raising, he discerned that "society is blind to the reality that teens need to face and overcome difficult challenges if they are to become confident, productive, fulfilled adults." He was inspired to create a curriculum focused on "development of character and a deeper sense of purpose" than just achieving good grades, going to a good college, and having a good job. He first took this vision to Berwick Academy when he was appointed headmaster there. Gauld recounts how conflicts with the trustees about his educational innovations led to his resignation, although one reporter writes that he was dismissed.

Gauld went on to establish the Hyde School at Elmhurst (commonly known as the Hyde Mansion), formerly the estate of "John Sedgewick Hyde, the son of Bath Iron Works (BIW) founder Thomas W. Hyde". Loans from friends and family, as well as "donations from the three heirs of the Hyde family", funded its purchase. The site included the Hyde Mansion with its indoor swimming pool, an educational wing built by the interim owners, the Pine Tree Society for Crippled Children and Adults, and 145 acres of land. The school is named after the Hyde family, the original owners.

Opened as a school for boys, Hyde went co-ed in 1971. Initial expansion plans began in the 1970s, with the school considering sites in the Midwest. In the 1990s, the school was also considering a "satellite school" on the West Coast, since a quarter of the student body at the time was from California. When a site became available in Woodstock, Connecticut in 1996, a second campus, known as Hyde-Woodstock, was opened on the campus of the former Annhurst College. In 1996, Hyde also purchased "a 700-acre tract of western maine woodland" in Eustis, ME, that is used as its wilderness campus.

Hyde has had some impact in the public school sector. Hyde ran a charter school in Washington, D.C. from 1999 to 2011. It currently has a K-12 charter school in the Bronx (Hyde Leadership Charter High School) and a K-8 charter school in Brooklyn (Hyde Leadership Charter School).

By 2016, like other boarding schools, both the Bath and Woodstock campuses were facing declining enrollment. It was announced in January 2017 that the 127-acre Woodstock campus would be closed and sold to nearby Woodstock Academy for $14.25 million (USD). The consolidation of the two campuses moved Woodstock students and many faculty to Bath, allowed for an expansion of the curriculum and student financial aid, as well as leading to plans to renovate some of the facilities.

In July 2025, a former student filed a lawsuit in federal court against the school claiming that it subjected her and hundreds of other students to forced manual labor and emotional abuse. In response, the chair of the school’s board of governors, Dana McCavity, said the lawsuit’s claims “grossly mischaracterize Hyde’s policies and practices over time or are patently false.” Parents of students and some former students have also spoken out in defense of the school. The school's alumni association published a statement in the Portland Press Herald, which hundreds of former students, parents and faculty signed, which said that the way the school had been depicted in recent interviews and on social media did not reflect “the school, the philosophy, or the people.”

== Educational model ==
=== Mission ===
The mission of Hyde is to build character and "reach students that nobody has been able to reach before" due to behavioral problems. Due to this, the school focuses on character education, leadership development, and developing student potential. In an interview in 1975, Joseph Gauld told a reporter that "he prefers not to see students academic transcripts before he starts school at Hyde. Instead, the school conducts extensive interviews with both the students and parents 'to see how they look at life and what the student wants to do at Hyde." In another interview in 1996, Gauld reiterated that transcripts were not examined until after a student's admission: "Grades are used as a placement tool, not an admissions tool." The current admissions page for the school does ask for transcripts, however.

=== Student body ===
A 1994 government report listed Hyde as one of the schools that "acknowledge that youths' problem behaviors are often related to family problems and disfunction" and asserted that "[m]ost of Hyde's students have a history of family problems." The "[p]rimary reasons for referral are rebelliousness, lack of respect for authority, and poor performance in school." The report clarified that "one study estimated that about 10 percent of the students have been in drug rehabilitation programs."

=== Curriculum ===
As part of the character-building curriculum, all students are required to participate in academics, performing arts, athletics, and community service. As a recent article describes, Hyde believes that "character, attitude and effort are factors that contribute to academic excellence and personal fulfilment. Hence, their character-based programming is incorporated in their regular curriculum spurring students to work on their leadership skills, public speaking confidence, and building meaningful relationships."

Hyde's students evaluate themselves against the school's five principles of Courage, Integrity, Leadership, Curiosity, and Concern. Regular visits from parents are required; they also participate in regional groups away from campus. Honors and Advanced Placement courses are offered, though graduation is based on personal development more than academics, with individual degrees being determined by community assessment.

Hyde also runs a leadership program in July for students ages 13–18. The program takes place on campus in Bath, Maine and on the school's Black Wilderness Preserve in Eustis, Maine.

=== Discipline in the Early Years of the School ===
Articles from the 1980s and 90s reported that strict behavioral rules were enacted and enforced by administrators and the community at Hyde. At that time, students could stop classes and call "concern meetings" to challenge peers they felt were underprepared. Reports of past disciplinary procedures have included slapping and public paddling, a student being "dunked" in a duck pond, a student being instructed to engage in a boxing match with a teacher, performing labor on school grounds and surrounding farms, living in isolation, digging a pit as a metaphorical grave, and receiving a masculine haircut.

In 2010, the Woodstock campus experimented with banning the use of technology on Tuesdays, in an attempt to increase face-to-face communication.

== Publications ==
- Gauld Joseph W. Character First: The Hyde School Difference, The Hyde School Foundation, 1993.
- Gauld, Malcolm & Laura Gauld. The Biggest Job We'll Ever Have: The Hyde School Program for Character-Based Education and Parenting, Scribner, 2003.
- Gauld, Malcolm. College Success Guaranteed: 5 Rules to Make It Happen, R&L Education, 2011.
- Gauld, Joseph W. What Kids Want and Need From Parents: How to Bond with and Mentor Children, Argo-Navis, 2012.
- Gauld, Joseph W. Hyde: Preparation for Life, The Hyde Foundation, 2012.
