= Deadsy =

American rock band

- Deadsy circa 2002

Background information
- Also known as: DÆDSY
- Origin: Los Angeles, California, U.S.
- Genres: Gothic rock; electronic rock; gothic metal; industrial rock
- Years active: 1995–2007; 2017–2024
- Labels: Sire; Warner Bros.; WitcHouse; Elementree; DreamWorks; Immortal; Tran Kilo
- Spinoffs: Orgy
- Members: Elijah Blue Allman; Alec Puro; Carlton Bost; Craig Riker
- Past members: Jens Funke; Ashburn Miller; Renn Hawkey; Jay Gordon
- Website: www.deadsy.tv
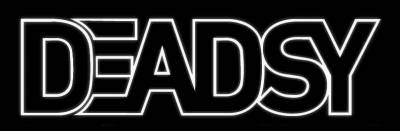

Deadsy is an American rock band from Los Angeles. Formed by Elijah Blue Allman in 1995, the band is characterized by analog keyboard and guitar synthesizers, Allman's baritone vocals, theatrical image and retro 1980s gothic rock style. Their fanbase is referred to as the Legion.

The band was initially signed to Sire Records, but their self-titled debut album for the label was shelved shortly before its 1997 release. After attempting to re-work the album, the label dropped them in 1999. After signing to Jonathan Davis' Elementree Records and finally releasing the album, now known as Commencement, in 2002, Deadsy toured across the United States, most notably performing on the Family Values Tour. After the release of Phantasmagore on Immortal Records/Elementree in 2006, the band went on hiatus in 2007. In 2020, it was reported the band had plans for a 2021 release of its third album titled Subterfugue, ahead of its re-release of Phantasmagore. The album has not yet been released. However, on February 8, 2024, the band would release their first single in 18 years, titled "(study for a portrait of) Napoleon in Rags".

== History ==
=== Early years and formation (1995–1996) ===
Deadsy formed in the summer of 1995, when Elijah Blue Allman (son of Cher and Gregg Allman) started recording a handful of demos (including "Flowing Glower", "Dear" and a cover of Pavement's "Texas Never Whispers") with Alec Puro on drums and producer Josh Abraham. He later sent a Juno 106 keyboard to his longtime friend from prep school Renn Hawkey (Dr. Nner) as an invitation to join the band. The three members evolved their sound in the studio and sought out a record deal out of, among other things, "adolescent necessity".

=== Sire Records (1996–1999) ===
While Deadsy shopped for its first record deal, Seymour Stein, President of Sire/Elektra Records, signed the band. Because they had no bass player at the time, Jay Gordon (of Orgy) was asked to play bass for their short self-titled album. After the album was recorded and released for promotion, the band temporarily relocated to New York City. Deadsy performed an impromptu showcase at Coney Island in 1997. Deadsy's self-titled album was slated for a release in the Spring of 1997, but due to Sire Records separating from Elektra Records, Seymour Stein halted plans for the release, and the band continued recording with Abraham. They also contributed the song "Replicas" to the Gary Numan tribute album Random on Beggars Banquet Records. London Records absorbed Sire Records and folded the label, leaving Deadsy at Warner Bros. They gave the band the option to leave with full ownership of their master recordings.

In 1998, Craig Riker joined as the bassist full-time and the band would continue writing and recording songs (including "Commencement", "She Likes Big Words" and "Seagulls") for the album which would now be titled Commencement.

=== Commencement (1999–2003) ===
In April 2000, Deadsy signed to Elementree Records, a label owned by longtime supporter Jonathan Davis of Korn, and by June 2000 the band secured the album's widespread distribution through DreamWorks Records. Later that year they would recruit Carlton Bost on Z-tar. In January of 2002, a few months before Commencement's release Ashburn Miller would replace Craig Riker on bass. With help from friend and Limp Bizkit frontman Fred Durst, they filmed a music video for "The Key To Gramercy Park". After multiple delays, Commencement was released on May 14, 2002, and the album debuted at number 100 of the Billboard 200 chart. A second video was filmed for their second single, a cover of Sebadoh's "Brand New Love". They were invited to perform on the 2001 Family Values Tour, and the band toured throughout 2002 with bands including Korn and Mindless Self Indulgence. The band recorded additional songs for the album with Jay Baumgardner and Josh Abraham (including a cover of Rush's "Tom Sawyer", "Winners" and the lead single "The Key to Gramercy Park").

=== Phantasmagore (2003–2007) ===
After DreamWorks Records was merged into Interscope in late 2003, Deadsy moved on from DreamWorks Records and signed with Immortal Records in 2006. Phantasmagore was released on August 22, 2006, and featured the 5 band members on the album cover in black and white. The album debuted on the Billboard 200 chart and Deadsy was asked back to appear on the Family Values Tour in 2006. Deadsy co-headlined a nationwide tour with the Deftones and also appeared at Lollapalooza that year. In January 2007, Deadsy parted ways with bassist Ashburn Miller, and added Jens Funke to their tour line up.

=== Hiatus (2007–2017) ===
In February 2007, a short statement from Allman confirmed that the band was taking a hiatus. Carlton Bost then joined The Dreaming full-time. On April 16, 2007, a MySpace bulletin was posted with a statement by Alec Puro, who wrote, "As you all know we are going to be taking a short break from Deadsy so Elijah can make a solo record and I can continue scoring projects I wasn't able to do from the road". In early 2008, Elijah Blue and the Trapezoids was revealed as the name of Allman's solo project, though as of 2016, the project has yet to release anything more than three demos on its MySpace page. He also was reported as following a career in visual art.

In February 2010, Allman claimed, "Deadsy is sleeping at the moment". Ashburn Miller and Carlton Bost joined Orgy's new line-up in September 2012.

=== Reformation (2018–2024) ===
On November 16, 2018, Deadsy (Allman, Hawkey, Puro and Bost) played a semi-acoustic show alongside Queens of the Stone Age at San Quentin State Prison. This marked the band's first appearance since 2006.

On July 14, 2020, Deadsy (now stylized as DÆDSY) announced on social media that their forthcoming album titled Subterfugue, was to be released in early 2021. They also announced that Phantasmagore would be remastered and returning to digital platforms and receiving a vinyl release. Craig Riker rejoined the band on bass, and Phantasmagore was re-released on Deadsy's own Tran Kilo label on November 2. The album was expected to receive a vinyl release, which never materialized after three years of pre-orders and waiting. In April 2023, Hawkey announced on Instagram that he was no longer a member of Deadsy. On January 9, 2024, Allman apologized to Deadsy's fanbase for the Phantasmagore vinyl reissue and took sole responsibility for the delays, saying that he had "dishonored you all, and dishonored myself by my inaction and silence". On February 1, 2024, Deadsy's official Instagram page posted an announcement for their first release since 2006. A single titled "(study for a portrait of) Napolean In Rags", which was released February 8, on Spotify. Q said that the song title may be a reference to the Bob Dylan song "Like a Rolling Stone".

=== Second hiatus (2024–present) ===
Elijah Allman was arrested in February and March 2026 in New Hampshire in two separate incidents. He was charged with misdemeanor trespassing and disturbing the peace at incident at St Paul's School on February 27. On March 1, he was arrested for felony charges of breaking and entering and burglary in Windham, New Hampshire.

== Style and influences ==
New Noise Magazine described Deadsy as being part of a short-lived movement in rock music which the magazine called "Undercore", a synthesis of glam, goth and synth-rock with science fiction. Deadsy has been categorized as gothic rock, electronic rock, gothic metal, industrial rock, nu metal, art rock, doom metal and new wave.

Metro defined Deadsy by an "authentic retro sound" that features analog keyboard synthesizer playing described as "dramatic", as well as "bristling synth guitars." The Dallas Observer said that the band "turns early-'80s synth-pop into a gory prep-school horror show". AllMusic described Deadsy as "bringing the flair of prog rock to the crushing grind of '90s metal and industrial". The band's music incorporates "metallic glam doom and even heavy prog". Elijah Blue Allman sings in a baritone vocal style that has been described as "seductive" and "full of strength and sexy masculinity". Deadsy was influenced by Bauhaus, Roxy Music, Gary Numan, Type O Negative and David Bowie, as well non-musical influences: "NES-era futurism, B-movie pulp (This Island Earth), and aristocratic gloom".

The band was once described as a "monied prep school secret society crossed with [a] teenage fascist group." Each band member represents one element or "entity" that drives human society. Each entity is also represented by their own color and unique appearance. Blue represented International Klein Blue and academia, Puro represented green and leisure, Hawkey represented yellow and science and medicine, Bost represented grey and war, and Riker represented red and horror. The band members also carry a white plastic chain accessory. Blue and Hawkey, former students at Maine's Hyde School, stated being "fascinated by Skull and Bones and other secret societies and all that stuff that people are very curious about that create an air of mystique". Blue continued by saying: "I often call this band 'a perversion of privilege'." The band's lyrics derive "symbolism and metaphor from the pages of literature and history, with repeated references to Urantia".

== Members ==
=== Current members ===
- Elijah Blue Allman – lead vocals, rhythm guitar, programming, (1995–2007, 2017–2024) bass (1995–1996)
- Alec Puro – drums, programming (1995–2007, 2017–2024)
- Carlton Bost – lead guitar, Z-Tar (1999–2007, 2017–2024)
- Craig Riker – bass (1998–2002, 2020–2024)

=== Former members ===
- Andy Trench – bass (1997)
- Jay Gordon – bass (1997)
- Ashburn Miller – bass (2002–2007)
- Jens Funke – bass (2007)
- Renn Hawkey – keyboards (1995–2007, 2017–2023)

Timeline

== Discography ==
=== Studio albums ===
List of studio albums, with selected chart positions
Title	Album details	Peak chart positions	
Title	Album details	US	US Ind.
Deadsy	Unreleased; Label: Sire, WitcHouse; Formats: CD	—	—
Commencement	Released: May 14, 2002; Label: Elementree, DreamWorks; Formats: CD	100	—
Phantasmagore	Released: August 22, 2006; Label: Elementree, Immortal; Formats: CD, LP	176	17
Subterfugue	Released: TBA; Label: Tran Kilo; Formats: TBA	TBA	
"—" denotes a recording that did not chart or was not released in that territory.

=== Singles ===
List of singles, showing year released and album name
Title	Year	Album
"The Elements"	1997	Deadsy
"The Key to Gramercy Park" / "Mansion World"^{[A]}	2001	Commencement
"Brand New Love"	2002	Commencement
"Friends"	2006	Non-album single
"(study for a portrait of) Napolean In Rags"	2024	Subterfugue

=== Music videos ===
List of music videos, showing year released and director
Title	Year	Director(s)
"She Likes Big Words"	2001	—N/a
"The Key to Gramercy Park"	2002	Fred Durst
"Brand New Love"	2002	Deadsy Legions
"Babes in Abyss"	2005	—N/a
"Razor Love"	2006	—N/a

== Notes ==
- A For its original 2001 release in the United States, "The Key to Gramercy Park" was released as a double A-side single with "Mansion World". "The Key to Gramercy Park" was re-released in 2002.
