= Industrial rock sales and awards =

This is a page containing all available sales and awards from industrial rock and industrial metal artists.

This list is far from complete. Many countries were excluded from it because their Industry Associations lacked a searchable, online database. Belgium, Iceland and Mexico are some of them. Some European countries who do have it (Greece, Hungary and Spain) were excluded anyway, because their databases showed no relevant sales pertaining industrial rock and metal groups. Latin American countries with online databases (Argentina and Brazil) were excluded over the same principle.

== Certifications ==
- Austria: 10,000 for gold - 20,000 for platinum (LPs); 15,000 for gold - 30,000 for platinum (Single).
- Australia: 35,000 for gold - 70,000 for platinum.
- Canada: 50,000 for gold - 100,000 for platinum.
- Denmark: 15,000 for gold - 30,000 for platinum.
- Finland: 15,000 for gold - 30,000 for platinum.
- France:
  - Before June 2006: 100,000 for gold - 300,000 for platinum.
  - As of June 2006: 75,000 for gold - 200,000 for platinum.
- Germany:
  - Before October 27, 2005: 250,000 for gold - 500,000 for platinum.
  - As of October 27, 2005: 100,000 for gold - 200,000 for platinum (LPs); 150,000 for gold - 300,000 for platinum (Single).
    - Music sales in Germany plummeted 40% from 2001 to 2005, which is probably the cause for the change in the country's certification system.
- Netherlands: 35,000 for gold - 70,000 for platinum.
- New Zealand: 7,500 for gold - 15,000 for platinum.
- Norway: 15,000 for gold - 30,000 for platinum.
- Poland: 10,000 for gold - 20,000 for platinum.
- Sweden: 20,000 for gold - 40,000 for platinum.
- Switzerland:
  - Until 2000: 25,000 for gold - 50,000 for platinum.
  - From 2001 to 2005: 20,000 for gold - 40,000 for platinum.
  - Since 2006: 15,000 for gold - 30,000 for platinum.
- United Kingdom: 60,000 for silver - 100,000 for gold - 300,000 for platinum.
- United States of America: 500,000 for gold - 1 million for platinum.

== Australia ==
=== Australia ===
Below are the accreditations for the Australian Recording Industry Association, from 1992 onwards:

- Marilyn Manson: Antichrist Superstar (1996): gold.
- Marilyn Manson: Mechanical Animals (1998): gold.
- Marilyn Manson: The Golden Age of Grotesque (2003): gold.
- Marilyn Manson: Lest We Forget: The Best Of (2004): gold.
- Ministry: Psalm 69 (1992): gold.

=== New Zealand ===
These are the certifications given by the Recording Industry Association of New Zealand from January 10, 1999, onwards:

- Marilyn Manson: Antichrist Superstar (1996): platinum.
- Marilyn Manson: Mechanical Animals (1998): platinum.

==== Note ====
The following records landed on New Zealand's Top 50 chart but apparently failed to receive certifications:

- Filter: Title of Record (1999).
- Marilyn Manson: The Last Tour on Earth (1999).
- Marilyn Manson: Holy Wood (2000).
- Marilyn Manson: The Golden Age of Grotesque (2003).
- Marilyn Manson: Lest We Forget (2004).
- Marilyn Manson: Eat Me, Drink Me (2007).
- Nine Inch Nails: The Fragile (1999).
- Nine Inch Nails: With Teeth (2005).
- Nine Inch Nails: Year Zero (2007).
- Rammstein: Sehnsucht (1997).
- Rammstein: Live Aus Berlin (1999).
- Rammstein: Mutter (2001).
- Rammstein: Reise, Reise (2004).
- Rammstein: Rosenrot (2005).
- Rob Zombie: Hellbilly Deluxe (1998).
- Stabbing Westward: Stabbing Westward (2001).

== Europe ==
=== Austria ===
These are the awards given by IFPI Austria:

- Marilyn Manson: Tainted Love single (2001): gold.
- Marilyn Manson: The Golden Age of Grotesque (2003): gold.
- Oomph!: Augen Auf! single (2004): gold.
- Rammstein: Sehnsucht (1997): platinum.
- Rammstein: Mutter (2001): gold.
- Rammstein: Reise, Reise (2004): platinum.

=== Denmark ===
Below are the IFPI Danmark awards given from 2004 to 2006:

- Rammstein: Live Aus Berlin (1999): gold.
- Rammstein: Mutter (2001): gold.
- Rammstein: Reise, Reise (2004): gold.
- Rammstein: Rosenrot (2005): gold.

=== Finland ===
==== EMMA Trophies ====
The EMMA-GAALA Awards are the Finnish equivalent to the Grammy Awards. Rammstein won an Emma trophy for "Best International Artist" in 2005.

==== IFPI Finland ====
This is IFPI Finland's awards from 2003 to 2007:

- Rammstein: Mutter (2001): gold.
- Rammstein: Reise, Reise (2004): gold.
- Rammstein: Rosenrot (2005): gold.

=== France ===
Here are the SNEP certifications, from 1994 onwards:

- Marilyn Manson: The Golden Age of Grotesque (2003): gold.
- Marilyn Manson: Lest We Forget (2004): gold.

=== Germany ===
==== ECHO Awards ====
The ECHO Deutscher Musikpreis is Germany's traditional music industry award. Here are some Echo awards and nominations for NDH artists:

- Rammstein receive, on March 5, 1998, an Echo Award for their video "Engel", winner in the "Best Video" category.
- On April 3, 1999, Rammstein receive the Echo Award for "Most Successful German Artist Internationally".
- Rammstein accept the "New Rock / Metal / Alternative" Echo Award on March 7, 2002.
- September 10, 2004: For the song cycle "Mein Herz brennt" by Torsten Rasch (based on lyrics and music from Rammstein), the Dresden Symphony Orchestra is to receive the "ECHO Klassik" in the category "Best debut recording".
- 2005 was Rammstein's Echo year; the group received two awards. One was for the "New Rock / Metal / Alternative" category and the other was for the "Best National Live Act" category.
- March 12, 2006: Rammstein won another ECHO Award and the category was “Best Rock / Alternative”.
- Oomph! were nominated for 2007's "Best Rock / Alternative" category (they didn't win).

==== Die Deutschen Phonoverbände ====
Here are the available sales from the IFPI Germany database:

- Marilyn Manson: The Golden Age of Grotesque (2003): gold.
- Marilyn Manson: Lest We Forget (2004): gold.
- Oomph!: Augen Auf! single (2004): gold.
- Rammstein: Herzeleid (1995): platinum.
- Rammstein: Engel single (1997): gold.
- Rammstein: Sehnsucht (1997): platinum.
- Rammstein: Live Aus Berlin (1999): gold.
- Rammstein: Mutter (2001): 2× platinum.
- Rammstein: Reise, Reise (2004): platinum.
- Rammstein: Völkerball (2007): 3× gold.

=== Netherlands ===
==== NVPI ====
Here are the certifications given by the Nederlandse Vereniging van Producenten en Importeurs van beeld- en geluidsdragers:

- Rammstein: Sehnsucht (1997): platinum.
- Rammstein: Mutter (2001): gold.

==== The Edison Award ====
The Edison Award is the Netherlands' premiere music award.

- Rammstein's Reise, Reise (2004) won the "Alternative" category in the 2005's Edison Awards.
- Rammstein's Rosenrot (2005) won the "Alternative" category in the 2006's Edison Awards.

=== Norway ===
==== IFPI Norsk ====
Here are the trophies from IFPI Norsk, from 1993 onwards:

- Rammstein: Mutter (2001): gold.

==== Spellemann ====
The Spellemannsprisen is the Norwegian equivalent to the Grammy Awards. The Kovenant won an award in the "Hardrock" category for Nexus Polaris (1998). Their third album, Animatronics (1999), won for the same category in the following year.

=== Poland ===
Here are the awards of the Polish Society of the Phonographic Industry:

- Rammstein: Mutter (2001): platinum.
- Rammstein: Rosenrot (2005): gold.

=== Sweden ===
==== Grammis ====
The Grammis are the Swedish version of the Grammys. Misery Loves Company won the "HÅRDROCK" award for their 1997 album, Not Like Them.

==== IFPI Svenska Gruppen ====
Here are the certifications given by IFPI Sweden:

- Marilyn Manson: "The Beautiful People" (1996): gold.
- Marilyn Manson: Mechanical Animals (1998): gold.
- Marilyn Manson: "The Dope Show" (1998): gold.
- Rammstein: Mutter (2001): gold.

=== Switzerland ===
Here are the certifications available from the Swisscharts.com:

- Marilyn Manson: Holy Wood (2000): gold.
- Marilyn Manson: The Golden Age of Grotesque (2003): gold.
- Rammstein: Sehnsucht (1997): 2× platinum.
- Rammstein: Live Aus Berlin (1999): gold.
- Rammstein: Mutter (2001): platinum.
- Rammstein: Reise, Reise (2004): platinum.
- Rammstein: Rosenrot (2005): platinum.
- Rammstein: Völkerball (2006): gold.

=== United Kingdom ===
==== BPI ====
Here are the certifications given by the British Phonographic Industry:

- Killing Joke: Night Time (1985): silver.
- Fear Factory: Demanufacture (1995): silver.
- Marilyn Manson: Portrait of an American Family (1994): silver.
- Marilyn Manson: Smells Like Children (1995): gold.
- Marilyn Manson: Antichrist Superstar (1996): gold.
- Marilyn Manson: Mechanical Animals (1998): gold.
- Marilyn Manson: The Last Tour on Earth (1999): silver.
- Marilyn Manson: Holy Wood (2000): gold.
- Marilyn Manson: "Tainted Love" (2002): silver.
- Marilyn Manson: The Golden Age of Grotesque (2003): gold.
- Marilyn Manson: Lest We Forget (2004): gold.
- Nine Inch Nails: Pretty Hate Machine (1989): silver.
- Nine Inch Nails: Fixed EP (1992): platinum.
- Nine Inch Nails: The Downward Spiral (1994): gold.
- Nine Inch Nails: Further Down the Spiral (1995): gold.
- Nine Inch Nails: The Fragile (1999): silver.
- Nine Inch Nails: With Teeth (2005): gold.
- Rammstein: Sehnsucht (1997): silver.
- Rammstein: Mutter (2001): gold.
- Rammstein: Reise, Reise (2004): gold.
- Rammstein: Rosenrot (2005): silver.
- White Zombie: Astro-Creep: 2000 – Songs of Love, Destruction and Other Synthetic Delusions of the Electric Head (2005): gold.

== North America ==
=== Canada ===
==== CRIA ====
Below are the online search results available from the Canadian Recording Industry Association database:

- Filter: Title of Record (1999): gold.
- Marilyn Manson: Smells Like Children (1995): platinum.
- Marilyn Manson: Antichrist Superstar (1996): 2× platinum.
- Marilyn Manson: Mechanical Animals (1998): platinum.
- Marilyn Manson: Holy Wood (2000): gold.
- Nine Inch Nails: Broken EP (1992): platinum.
- Nine Inch Nails: The Downward Spiral (1994): 3× platinum.
- Nine Inch Nails: The Fragile (1999): 2× platinum.
- Nine Inch Nails: With Teeth (2005): platinum.
- Ministry: Psalm 69 (1992): gold.
- Orgy: Candyass (1998): gold.
- Rammstein: Sehnsucht (1997): platinum.
- Rob Zombie: Hellbilly Deluxe (1998): 2× platinum.
- Rob Zombie: American Made Music to Strip By (1999): gold.
- Rob Zombie: The Sinister Urge (2001): gold.
- Rob Zombie: Past, Present & Future (2003): gold.
- Skinny Puppy: Remission (1984): gold.
- Skinny Puppy: Bites (1985): gold.
- White Zombie: La Sexorcisto: Devil Music, Vol. 1 (1992): gold.
- White Zombie: Astro Creep: 2000 (1995): platinum.
- White Zombie: Supersexy Swingin' Sounds (1996): gold.

=== United States ===
==== Nielsen Soundscans ====
Here's some Nielsen Soundscan figures for Industrial rock artists in the United States. Most of these sales figures aren't up-to-date. The Soundscans of Ministry's discography and the latest by NIN, Rammstein and Marilyn Manson were taken this year. In contrast, the Soundscan sale numbers from Broken are almost 14 years old.

- 2wo: Voyeurs (1998): 47,469.
- Dope: Felons & Revolutionaries (1999): 216,149.
- Dope: Life (2001): around 73 thousand.
- Dope: Group Therapy (2003): 37,749.
- Fear Factory: Soul of a New Machine (1992): 91,888.
- Fear Factory: Demanufacture (1995): 240,229.
- Fear Factory: Obsolete (1998): 406,247.
- Fear Factory: Digimortal (2001): 156,264.
- Fear Factory: Archetype (2004): 96,509.
- Filter: Short Bus (1995): 622,000.
- Filter: Title of Record (1999): 827,000.
- Filter: The Amalgamut (2002): more than 90,000.
- God Lives Underwater: Empty (1995): 93,708.
- God Lives Underwater: LitS-CSA (1998): 80,182.
- Gravity Kills: Gravity Kills (1996): 103,000+
- KMFDM: Angst (1993): 100,000+
- KMFDM: Nihil (1995): 120,000+
- KMFDM: Xtort (1996): 200,000+
- KMFDM: Attak (2002): 20,000
- KMFDM: WWIII: 20,000
- Marilyn Manson: Portrait of an American Family (1994): 541,286.
- Marilyn Manson: Lunchbox EP (1995): 177,675.
- Marilyn Manson: Smells Like Children (1995): 1,134,615.
- Marilyn Manson: Antichrist Superstar (1996): 1,661,827.
- Marilyn Manson: Mechanical Animals (1998): 1,237,008.
- Marilyn Manson: The Last Tour on Earth (1999): 315,901.
- Marilyn Manson: Holy Wood (2000): 446,756.
- Marilyn Manson: The Golden Age of Grotesque (2003): 385,572.
- Marilyn Manson: Lest We Forget (2004): 418,753.
- Marilyn Manson: Eat Me, Drink Me (2007): 214,594.
- Ministry: The Land of Rape and Honey (1988): 323,370.
- Ministry: The Mind is a Terrible Thing to Taste (1989): 487,474.
- Ministry: In Case You Didn't Feel Like Showing Up (1990): 196,225.
- Ministry: Jesus Built My Hotrod (1991): 148,894.
- Ministry: Psalm 69 (1992): 961,952.
- Ministry: The Fall (1995): 30,196.
- Ministry: Filth Pig (1996): 236,557.
- Ministry: Dark Side of the Spoon (1999): 79,459.
- Ministry: Greatest Fits (2001): 89,283.
- Ministry: Animositisomina (2003): 46,319.
- Ministry: Houses of the Molé (2004): 45,419.
- Ministry: Rio Grande Blood (2006): 34,346.
- Ministry: The Last Sucker (2007): 5,140.
- Mortiis: The Grudge (2004): 418.
- Mushroomhead: Mushroomhead (1995): 47,804
- Mushroomhead: XX (2001): 161,700
- Mushroomhead: Savior Sorrow (2006): over 80,000
- Nine Inch Nails: Pretty Hate Machine (1989): around 3 million.
- Nine Inch Nails: Broken EP (1992): around 645 thousand.
- Nine Inch Nails: The Fragile (1999): around 875 thousand.
- Nine Inch Nails: Things Falling Apart (2000): around 186 thousand.
- Nine Inch Nails: With Teeth (2005): 939,416.
- Nine Inch Nails: Year Zero (2007): 426,531.
- Orgy: Candyass (1998): 1,163,898.
- Orgy: Vapor Transmission (2000): 319,759.
- Orgy: Punk Statik Paranoia (2004): 5,353.
- Pitchshifter: www.pitchshifter.com (1998): 60,152.
- Pitchshifter: Deviant (2000): 33,353.
- Rammstein: Sehnsucht (1997): 797,352.
- Rammstein: Mutter (2001): around 162 thousand.
- Rammstein: Reise, Reise (2004): 26,721.
- Rammstein: Rosenrot (2005): 30,189.
- Rammstein: Völkerball (2007): 4,579.
- Rob Zombie: Hellbilly Deluxe (1998): 2,609,972.
- Rob Zombie: American Made Music To Strip By (1999): 234,631.
- Rob Zombie: The Sinister Urge (2001): 744,859.
- Rob Zombie: Past, Present & Future (2003): around 1,28 million.
- Rob Zombie: Educated Horses (2006): 352,891
- Sister Machine Gun: Burn (1995): 14,919.
- Stabbing Westward: Wither Blister Burn & Peel (1996): more than 717 thousand.
- Stabbing Westward: Stabbing Westward (2001): 84,533.
- Spineshank: Strictly Diesel (1998): 66,889.
- Spineshank: Height of Callousness (2000): 146,568.
- Static-X: Wisconsin Death Trip (1999): around 962 thousand.
- Static-X: Machine (2001): around 557 thousand.
- Static-X: Shadow Zone (2003): around 302 thousand.
- Static-X: Start A War (2005): around 210 thousand.
- Static-X: Cannibal (2007): around 122 thousand.
- The Union Underground: An Education In Rebellion (2000): 371,220.
- The Union Underground: One Nation Underground... Live EP (2002): 7,598.

==== RIAA ====
The following list includes all the Recording Industry Association of America certifications for industrial rock artists:

- Fear Factory: Obsolete (1998): gold.
- Filter: Short Bus (1995): platinum.
- Filter: Title of Record (1999): platinum.
- Marilyn Manson: Portrait of an American Family (1994): gold.
- Marilyn Manson: Smells Like Children (1995): platinum.
- Marilyn Manson: Antichrist Superstar (1996): platinum.
- Marilyn Manson: Mechanical Animals (1998): platinum.
- Marilyn Manson: Holy Wood (2000): gold.
- Marilyn Manson: Lest We Forget (2004): gold.
- Ministry: Land of Rape and Honey (1988): gold.
- Ministry: The Mind is a Terrible Thing to Taste (1989): gold.
- Ministry: Psalm 69 (1992): platinum.
- Nine Inch Nails: Pretty Hate Machine (1989): 3× platinum.
- Nine Inch Nails: Broken EP (1992): platinum.
- Nine Inch Nails: The Downward Spiral (1994): 4× platinum.
- Nine Inch Nails: Further Down the Spiral (1995): gold.
- Nine Inch Nails: The Fragile (1999): 2× platinum.
- Nine Inch Nails: With Teeth (2005): gold.
- Orgy: Candyass (1998): platinum.
- Orgy: Vapor Transmission (2000): gold.
- Rammstein: Sehnsucht (1997): platinum.
- Rob Zombie: Hellbilly Deluxe (1998): 3× platinum.
- Rob Zombie: The Sinister Urge (2001): platinum.
- Rob Zombie: Past, Present & Future (2003): platinum.
- Stabbing Westward: Wither Blister Burn & Peel (1996): gold.
- Stabbing Westward: Darkest Days (1998): gold.
- Static-X: Wisconsin Death Trip (1999): platinum.
- Static-X: Machine (2001): gold.
- White Zombie: La Sexorcisto: Devil Music, Vol. 1 (1992): 2× platinum.
- White Zombie: Astro Creep: 2000 (1995): 2× platinum.
- White Zombie: Supersexy Swingin' Sounds (1996): gold.

==== The Grammys ====
===== Nominees =====
All the Grammy nominees below were indicated for Best Metal / Hard Rock Performance:

- Ministry: Psalm 69 (1992): "N.W.O".
- Nine Inch Nails: Broken EP (1992): "Wish".
- Nine Inch Nails: Woodstock '94 soundtrack (1994): "Happiness In Slavery".
- Rob Zombie & Alice Cooper: Songs in the Key of X (1996): "Hands of Death (Burn Baby Burn)".
- White Zombie: Supersexy Swingin' Sounds (1996): "I'm Your Boogie Man".
- Nine Inch Nails: Lost Highway (1997): "The Perfect Drug".
- Rammstein: Sehnsucht (1997): "Du Hast".
- Marilyn Manson: Mechanical Animals (1998): "The Dope Show".
- Rob Zombie: Hellbilly Deluxe (1998): "Superbeast".
- Marilyn Manson: The Last Tour on Earth (1999): "Astonishing Panorama of the Endtimes".
- Ministry: Dark Side of the Spoon (1999): "Bad Blood".
- Nine Inch Nails: The Fragile (1999): "Starfuckers, Inc".
- Rob Zombie: The Sinister Urge (2001): "Never Gonna Stop (The Red, Red Kroovy)".
- Marilyn Manson: The Golden Age of Grotesque (2003): "mOBSCENE".
- Spineshank: Self-Destructive Pattern (2003): "Smothered".
- Rammstein: Reise, Reise (2004): "Mein Teil".
- Ministry: Rantology (2005): "The Great Satan".
- Nine Inch Nails: With Teeth (2005): "The Hand that Feeds".
- Nine Inch Nails: With Teeth (2005): "Every Day Is Exactly the Same".
- Ministry: Rio Grande Blood (2006): "Lies Lies Lies".

===== Winners =====
- Nine Inch Nails: Broken EP (1992): "Wish".
- Nine Inch Nails: Woodstock '94 soundtrack (1994): "Happiness In Slavery".

==== MTV Music Video Awards ====
===== Nominees =====
- Nine Inch Nails: Broken EP (1992): "Wish".
- Nine Inch Nails: The Downward Spiral (1994): "Closer".
- White Zombie: Astro-Creep: 2000 (1995): "More Human Than Human".
- Marilyn Manson: Smells Like Children (1995): "Sweet Dreams".
- Marilyn Manson: Antichrist Superstar (1996): "The Beautiful People".
- Nine Inch Nails: Lost Highway soundtrack (1997): "The Perfect Drug".
- David Bowie & Trent Reznor: Earthling (1997): "I'm Afraid of Americans".
- Marilyn Manson: Mechanical Animals (1998): "The Dope Show".
- Nine Inch Nails: The Fragile (1999): "Into the Void".

===== Winners =====
- White Zombie: Astro-Creep: 2000 (1995): "More Human Than Human".
- Marilyn Manson: Mechanical Animals (1998): "The Dope Show".

==== American Music Awards ====
- Nine Inch Nails were nominated twice (1995 and 1996) for the "Favorite Alternative Artist" award.

== Other certifications ==
These below are the sales figures and certifications gathered from sources other than the official Music Industry Associations sites and Nielsen Soundscans.

- Burton C. Bell said that Fear Factory earned two gold records in Australia, but he doesn't specify which two were certified. On Raymond Herrera's LinkedIn profile, though, it is revealed that these awards went to the Demanufacture (1995) and Obsolete (1998) records.
- In a 2003 interview, Sascha Konietzko told The Culture Shock site that KMFDM's Soundscan sales rounded up to about 2 million units sold in the US.
- Other sources point out that Oomph's Augen Auf! is actually a platinum certified single in Germany and its parent album, Wahrheit oder Pflicht (2004), has already reached the gold status.
- Prick's self-titled debut (1995) sold about 66,000 units and its follow-up, The Wreckard (2002), sold over 3 thousand copies.
- Rammstein received a gold award in Belgium for 2001's Mutter. They also received a platinum award for Rosenrot (2005) in the Czech Republic.
- Though mysteriously absent from Germany's IFPI database, Rammstein's Rosenrot went platinum one month after its release. By the end of the year, the said record went 2× platinum.
- Rammstein received a Word Sales Award in December 2005 for selling over 10 million copies around the globe. Their current sales number worldwide has surpassed the 14 million mark.
- Rob Zombie has sold more than 15 million records worldwide, according to Roadrunner's news site.
- The RIAA's internet database might not be entirely accurate. Other sources point out that White Zombie's Astro Creep: 2000 has gone 3× platinum and Rob's American Made Music to Strip By has already reached gold status.
- According to Soundscan numbers, NIN's With Teeth should have been certified platinum, while Marilyn Manson Antichrist Superstar should be certified 2× Platinum; Lest We Forget: The Best Of should be certified Platinum and The Golden Age of Grotesque should be certified gold.

== Totals ==
=== Bestselling Groups (IFPI) ===
Sales based on IFPI-certificated albums only (no Soundscan):

- Nine Inch Nails: 11,2 million.
- Marilyn Manson: 7,04 million.
- Rammstein: 5,57 million.
- Rob Zombie: 5,3 million.
- White Zombie: 2,65 million.
- Ministry: ~2,09 million.
- Filter: 2,05 million.
- Orgy: 1,55 million.
- Static-X: 1,5 million.
- Stabbing Westward: 1 million.
- Fear Factory: 0,63 million.
- Oomph!: ~0,42 million.
- Skinny Puppy: 0,1 million.
- Killing Joke: 0,06 million.

=== Certifications ===
This is a list of all IFPI-certificated bands featured in this page, arranged by number of awards:

- Rammstein: 17 platinum, 22 gold.
- Nine Inch Nails: 18 platinum, 3 gold, 3 silver.
- Marilyn Manson: 9 platinum, 24 gold, 3 silver.
- Rob Zombie: 7 platinum, 3 gold.
- White Zombie: 3 platinum, 2 gold.
- Ministry: 1 platinum, 4 gold.
- Filter: 2 platinum, 1 gold.
- Orgy: 1 platinum, 2 gold.
- Oomph!: 1 platinum, 2 gold.
- Fear Factory: 3 gold, 1 silver.
- Static-X: 1 platinum, 1 gold.
- Stabbing Westward: 2 gold.
- Skinny Puppy: 2 gold.
- Killing Joke: 1 silver.

=== Bestselling Countries ===
The following list is composed by IFPI certificated albums only (no Soundscan):

- United States of America: 32,5 million sold.
- Germany: 4,25 - 4,95 million.
- Canada: 2 million sold.
- United Kingdom: 1,76 million sold.
- Switzerland: 305 thousand sold.
- Australia: 245 thousand sold.
- France: 200 thousand sold.
- Netherlands: 105 thousand sold.
- Austria: 90 thousand.
- Sweden: 80 thousand sold.
- Denmark: 60 thousand sold.
- Finland: 45 thousand sold.
- Poland: 30 thousand sold.
- New Zealand: 30 thousand sold.
