= Sehnsucht (disambiguation) =

Sehnsucht is a German noun approximately translated as "longing", "yearning", or "craving".

Sehnsucht may also refer to:

== Film ==
- Sehnsucht (1921 film) or Desire, a lost film by F. W. Murnau
- Sehnsucht (2006 film), a German film by Valeska Grisebach, for which she was named Best Female Director at the Copenhagen International Film Festival
- Sehnsucht 202, 1932 German musical comedy film

== Music ==
- "Sehnsucht" (Jimmy Makulis song), 1961
- Sehnsucht (Lacrimosa album), 2009
- Sehnsucht (Rammstein album), or the title song, 1997
- Sehnsucht (Schiller album), or the title song, 2008
- "Sehnsucht" (Strauss), 1896
- "Sehnsucht", a song by Ellen Allien from Berlinette
- "Sehnsucht", a song by Einstürzende Neubauten from Kollaps
- Sehnsucht (band), a band featuring former Mayhem frontman Sven Erik Kristiansen
