= Jay Gordon (singer) =

American singer (born 1967)

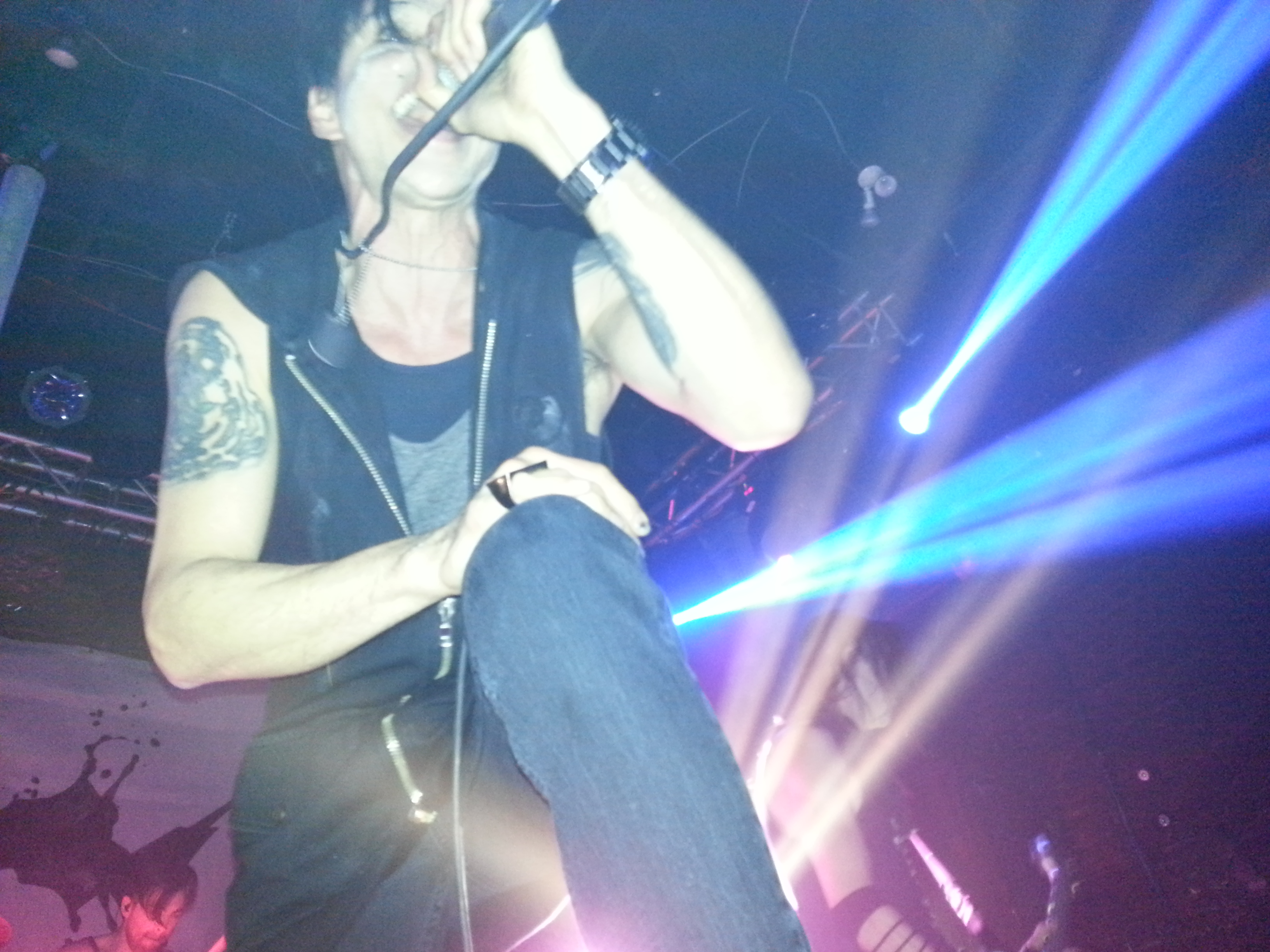
- Gordon performing in 2015

Background information
- Also known as: Killowatt
- Born: January 30, 1967 (age 59)
- Genres: Industrial rock; electronic rock; nu metal; dubstep
- Occupation: Singer
- Years active: 1984–present
- Member of: Orgy
- Formerly of: Deadsy; The Wondergirls
- Website: orgymusic.com

Jay Gordon (born January 30, 1967) is an American singer. He is best known as the lead singer of the rock band Orgy, which he co-founded in 1997.

== Career ==
=== 1997–2000 ===
Jay started his career in music by producing Coal Chamber's self-titled debut as well as playing Bass for the synth rock band Deadsy. After leaving Deadsy he would go on to co-found Orgy, who were categorized as "death-pop" by the band. Orgy's first release, 1998's Candyass, would prove to be a huge success and earned a platinum certification in sales, which was primarily fueled by the popularity of their cover of New Order's "Blue Monday", as well as that of their first single, "Stitches". The band would release singles of both during this period, which would contain numerous remixes of the songs, some of which were created by Gordon himself, a trend which would continue to occur throughout all of Orgy's subsequent single releases.

September 1998, Jay and Orgy bandmate Amir Derakh would collaborate alongside Misfits and former Samhain singer Glenn Danzig on his solo record 6:66 Satan's Child which was released in January the following year.

Around 1999, Jay along with his bandmate from Orgy Ryan Shuck would start a shortly lived alt rock super group with Scott Weiland of Stone Temple Pilots called "The Wondergirls".

In 2000, Orgy released their second full-length album.

=== 2000–present ===
The period following the release of Vapor Transmission proved to be a tumultuous period for the band. Orgy left Elementree and Reprise Records. Drummer Bobby Hewitt left the band in order to join his brother Fab Fernandez in the group Snake River Conspiracy, although he would eventually return. It would be four years between the release of Vapor Transmission and Orgy's third album, 2004's Punk Statik Paranoia.

In 2002, Gordon performed the song "Slept So Long" for the Queen of the Damned soundtrack, due to contractual limitations which restricted composer Jonathan Davis from performing the vocals to his composed songs as they appeared upon the actual soundtrack (although Davis did, in fact, perform all musical tracks within the movie itself). Gordon has also appeared with his band Orgy on other soundtracks such as Zoolander, which featured the previously unreleased song "Faces".

Gordon remixed "Points of Authority", a song by Linkin Park from their album Hybrid Theory, for the latter's remix album Reanimation. This was entitled "Pts.OF.Athrty", which was released as the first and only single of Reanimation, and has achieved moderate success at the Billboard charts.

In 2003, Jay Gordon and his father, Lou, would start their own independent record label, D1 Music that would go onto release mostly Orgy records and a few rap albums.

In 2004, he voiced several characters for the video game Vampire: The Masquerade – Bloodlines.

In October 2010, members of Orgy collectively brought accusations against Gordon of having "fired the band". In response, Gordon released a public statement denying the claims. Orgy released a new single titled "Wide Awake and Dead" on March 18, 2014, and shot a video for "Wide Awake and Dead" on April 22. Orgy released the first of two EPs in 2015, titled Talk Sick, and an unnamed EP that was released in 2016.

== Discography ==
Orgy

- Candyass
- Vapor Transmission
- Punk Statik Paranoia
- Talk Sick (EP)

Deadsy

- Deadsy (1997)
- Commencement

Coal Chamber

- Coal Chamber
- Chamber Music

Danzig

- 6:66 Satan's Child
