= Stitches (Orgy song) =

Single by Orgy

from the album Candyass
- Released: April 30, 1998; November 23, 1999 (re-release)
- Genre: Industrial rock; nu metal
- Length: 3:13 (album version)
- Label: Warner Bros.; Reprise; Elementree
- Songwriters: Amir Derakh; Jay Gordon; Bobby Hewitt; Ryan Shuck
- Producers: Josh Abraham; Orgy

Orgy singles chronology
"Stitches" (1998)	"Blue Monday" (1998)

"Stitches" is a song by Orgy, released as the band's first single in 1998, and then re-released the following year due to the popularity of their cover of "Blue Monday". It was released on November 23, 1999, as an enhanced compact disc, along with a music video in low quality, medium quality, and high quality in QuickTime format.

During the early live performances, the band would prepend the song with a minute-long intro; the purpose of it was to inform Gordon of the key of the song, as the song starts out with solo vocals.

In 2017, Annie Zaleski of Spin named it the tenth best nu metal track of all time.

== Track listing ==
"Stitches / Dissention" maxi single

No.	Title	Length
1.	"Stitches" (Hardknox Mix)	4:57
2.	"Stitches" (P.Q.M.'s Cracker Beat Radio Pass)	3:46
3.	"Stitches" (DJ Dan Mix)	8:28
4.	"Stitches" (P.Q.M.'s Amped Up Dub) (with vocals)	8:18
5.	"Stitches" (P.Q.M.'s Cracker Beat Pass)	4:26
6.	"Stitches" (Smack My Stitch Up Extended Mix)	5:19
7.	"Dissention" (Remix)	3:42

CD promo single

No.	Title	Length
1.	"Stitches" (Radio Edit)	3:21
2.	"Stitches" (Call-Out Research Hook #1)	0:21
3.	"Stitches" (Call-Out Research Hook #2)	0:17

"Stitches / Blue Monday" promo single

No.	Title	Length
1.	"Stitches" (Radio Edit)	3:21
2.	"Stitches" (Hardknox Mix)	4:57
3.	"Stitches" (P.Q.M.'s Cracker Beat Radio Pass)	3:45
4.	"Stitches" (DJ Dan Mix)	8:28
5.	"Stitches" (P.Q.M.'s Amped Up Dub) (with vocals)	8:18
6.	"Stitches" (P.Q.M.'s Cracker Beat Pass)	4:25
7.	"Stitches" (Smack My Stitch Up Extended Mix)	5:19
8.	"Blue Monday" (P.Q.M.'s Deephead Pass)	7:45

12" single

Side A
No.	Title	Length
1.	"Stitches" (DJ Dan Mix)	8:31
2.	"Stitches" (Hardknox Mix)	4:56

Side B
No.	Title	Length
1.	"Stitches" (P.Q.M.'s Amped Up Dub)	8:18
2.	"Stitches" (P.Q.M.'s Cracker Beat Pass)	4:25

12" promo single

Side A
No.	Title	Length
1.	"Stitches" (DJ Dan Mix)	8:31

Side B
No.	Title	Length
1.	"Stitches" (Hardknox Mix)	4:56

== Charts ==
Chart (1999)	Peak position
US Active Rock (Billboard)	28
US Alternative Airplay (Billboard)	18
US Mainstream Rock (Billboard)	38

== Personnel ==
- Jay Gordon – vocals, programming, synthesizers
- Ryan Shuck – guitar
- Amir Derakh – guitar
- Paige Haley – bass
- Bobby Hewitt – drums
