= Longing =

Longing may refer to:

== Music ==
- Longing (Bell Witch album) (2012)
- Longing (Dusty Springfield album), an unreleased 1974 album
- Longing (Pete Murray album) (2025)
- "Longing" (song), a 1994 song by X Japan
- "Longing", a song by Gackt from Dirge of Cerberus: Final Fantasy VII Original Soundtrack
- "Longing", a song by Galneryus from Angel of Salvation
- "Longing", a song by Helloween from Chameleon
- "The Longing", a song by Imelda May from Life Love Flesh Blood
- "Longing", a composition for viola and piano by Alfred Moffat
- "Longing", a composition for piano by Josef Suk

== Other uses ==
- Longing (emotion) or desire
- Cape Longing, a headland in Antarctica
- Longing (play), a 2013 play by William Boyd
- The Longing, a 2020 video game
- The Longing (film), a 2002 film
- Longing (2006 film), a German film
- The Longing (2007 film), a documentary film
- Longing (2017 film), an Israeli film
- Longing (2024 film), an American comedy-drama

== See also ==
- Long (disambiguation)
- Sehnsucht (disambiguation)
