= Blue Monday (New Order song) =

1983 single by New Order

- Original die-cut sleeve

Single by New Order
- B-side: "The Beach" (12-inch version); "Thieves Like Us" (7-inch version)
- Released: 7 March 1983
- Recorded: 1982
- Studio: Britannia Row, Islington, UK
- Genre: Synth-pop; Eurodisco; alternative dance; hi-NRG; dance-pop
- Length: 7:29 (12-inch version); 4:09 (7-inch version)
- Label: Factory (12-inch version); Tonpress (7-inch version)
- Songwriters: Gillian Gilbert; Peter Hook; Stephen Morris; Bernard Sumner
- Producer: New Order

New Order singles chronology
"Temptation" (1982)	"Blue Monday" (1983)	"Confusion" (1983)

Lyric video
- "Blue Monday" on YouTube

"Blue Monday" is a song by the English rock band New Order. It was released as a 12-inch single on 7 March 1983 through Factory Records. It appears on certain cassette and CD versions of New Order's second studio album, Power, Corruption & Lies (1983). The track was written and produced by Gillian Gilbert, Peter Hook, Stephen Morris and Bernard Sumner.

"Blue Monday" is a Eurodisco, synth-pop and alternative dance song that drew inspirations from many works of other artists. The 12-inch single was backed with a primarily instrumental version of the song entitled "The Beach" on the B-side. The single's unique packaging was designed by Peter Saville and Brett Wickens. It features a die-cut sleeve designed to resemble a 5 1/4-inch floppy disk. The cover features no words, but instead has code, invented by Saville, in the form of coloured blocks that contains the artist, song and label information.

The original single made the top 10 in many countries. It reached number nine on the UK singles chart and spent 38 weeks in the top 75. It spent 186 weeks on the UK Independent Singles Chart, effectively selling for four years until the release of the Substance 1987 compilation on which it featured. The UK Indie Chart run was second only to "Love Will Tear Us Apart" by Joy Division, which clocked 195 weeks (their runs overlapped). In New Zealand, it peaked at number 2 and spent 74 weeks (spread across three calendar years) in the top 50. The 1988 remix reached number 3 on the British chart and number 4 on the Australian chart, and it topped the dance chart in the United States.

"Blue Monday" is the best-selling 12-inch single in history. In the United Kingdom, it has sold 1.16 million copies in all formats, including the 1988 and 1995 re-releases. Sales of the original 1983 12-inch release account for the bulk of the total, at over 700,000 copies. It was remixed by the band twice, in 1988 and 1995. The 1988 remix reached number 1 in New Zealand and the top 10 in other countries. The song has been covered by bands including Orgy, Flunk, 808 State, the Enemy and Health. In 2021 and 2022, Rolling Stone included it at numbers 235 and 18 in its lists of the "500 Greatest Songs of All Time" and "200 Greatest Dance Songs of All Time".

== Background and writing ==
New Order was formed in 1980 by the former members of Joy Division, which split after the death of their singer, Ian Curtis. They later recruited Gillian Gilbert as keyboardist and second guitarist, and began to explore new musical technology such as synthesisers.

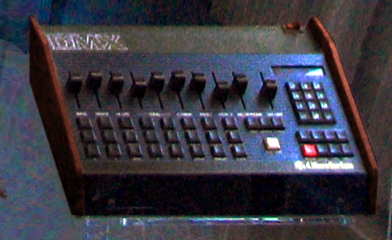
An Oberheim DMX drum machine was used to create the rhythm and synchronise the sequences.

New Order wrote "Blue Monday" in their rehearsal room in Cheetham Hill, Manchester.

The synth bassline was performed on a Moog Source and sequenced on a sequencer built by the singer, Bernard Sumner. An Oberheim DMX drum machine was used for rhythm. The kick drum was recorded playing through a studio monitor to capture the room's natural reverb. New Order bought an early sampler, the Emulator 1, and sampled choir sounds from Kraftwerk's "Uranium". The band learned how to use the sampler by recording their flatulence and sneezes.

New Order worked before the advent of MIDI, and so enlisted the engineer Martin Usher to design a circuit to synchronise the synthesisers and drum machine. The sequence was programmed using binary code. Gilbert wrote the sequence out by hand on a long roll of paper, and accidentally added an extra rest, throwing the sequence slightly out of time; the band liked the effect and kept it in the song. New Order also reused some elements from their 1982 composition "Video 5 8 6".

The bassist, Peter Hook, cited Kraftwerk, Giorgio Moroder and Sparks as influences, and said the song was "stolen" from the Donna Summer song "Our Love". Sumner cited Kraftwerk along with Cabaret Voltaire, the Human League and OMD, and said that parts were taken from "Dirty Talk" by Klein + MBO and "You Make Me Feel (Mighty Real)" by Sylvester.

== Composition ==
"Blue Monday"
A 30-second sample of the song, displaying its upbeat electronic drums and synth bass line as well as Bernard Sumner's deadpan vocals.

"Blue Monday" was described as New Order "getting into Euro disco" by drummer Stephen Morris, and labelled a "synth-pop classic" cementing the band's transition from post-punk to alternative dance by critics. Barney Hoskyns of Spin highlighted the song as an example of the hi-NRG style of club music, and the 2004 edition of The Rolling Stone Album Guide called it "the ultimate in flawlessly programmed, LSD-driven, push-button dance-pop".

The song begins with a semiquaver kick drum, followed by a sequenced melody. "Blue Monday" does not feature a standard verse-chorus structure. After a lengthy introduction, the first and second verses are contiguous and are separated from the third verse only by a brief series of sound effects. A short breakdown follows the third verse, which leads to an extended outro.

"Blue Monday" was described by the BBC Radio 2 "Sold on Song" feature as "a crucial link between Seventies disco and the dance/house boom that took off at the end of the Eighties." Synth-pop had been a major force in British popular music for several years, but "Blue Monday", with encouragement by the band's manager Rob Gretton, was a dance record that also exhibited influences from the New York club scene.

== Packaging ==
The 1983 edition artwork is designed to resemble a 5 1/4 inch floppy disk. The sleeve does not display either the group name or song title in plain English anywhere; the only text on the sleeve is "FAC SEVENTY THREE" on the spine. Instead the legend "FAC 73 BLUE MONDAY AND THE BEACH NEW ORDER" is represented in code by a series of coloured blocks. The key enabling this to be deciphered was printed on the back sleeve of the album, Power, Corruption & Lies. "Blue Monday" and Power, Corruption & Lies are two of four Factory releases from this time period to employ the colour code, the others being "Confusion" by New Order and From the Hip by Section 25.

The single's original sleeve, created by Factory designer Peter Saville and Brett Wickens, was die-cut with a silver inner sleeve. It cost so much to produce that Factory Records actually lost money on each copy sold. Matthew Robertson's Factory Records: The Complete Graphic Album notes that "[d]ue to the use of die-cutting and specified colours, the production cost of this sleeve was so high that the single sold at a loss." Tony Wilson noted that it lost 5p per sleeve "due to our strange accounting system"; Saville noted that nobody expected "Blue Monday" to be a commercially successful record at all, so nobody expected the cost to be an issue." In Shadowplayers: The Rise and Fall of Factory Records, Saville states "I am so bored with this story. We didn't even know how many of these expensive covers were ever made anyway."

Robertson also noted that "later reissues had subtle changes to limit the cost" (the diecut areas being replaced with printed silver ink). Saville commented in 2013 that the printers "banged out a cheaper version. I don't know how many thousands were sold [the original] way, or whether Factory were charged the full price for something they didn't get, which would be very Factory." Peter Saville Associates charged Factory £538.20 for the sleeve design. The artwork was so late that Saville sent it straight to the printer, unreviewed by either the band or the label. The 1988 and 1995 versions were packaged in conventional sleeves.

== Music videos ==
A music video for a shortened version of the original was created in 1983, featuring military clips with false colour, simple computer-generated graphics such as colour blocks and geometric lines, digitised video of band members at very low resolution and framerate, a brief amount of footage taken from the 1977 film Close Encounters of the Third Kind, and a short appearance of the 1982 video game Zaxxon. The colour blocks were created using Peter Saville's colour-coded alphabet.

The music video for "Blue Monday '88" appears on the Substance video collection (released as a companion to the album of the same name). The video features sketches by photographer William Wegman and his Weimaraner dog named Fay Ray doing balancing acts intercut with hand-drawn animation by Robert Breer. The band members are shown standing around doing various tasks, such as walking a wooden plank over a floor that is painted blue, holding wire-mesh constructed art and milk crates over their faces, being hit by tennis balls, and standing still while they flip through various flip books (tying into the hand-drawn animation sequences).

In September 2012, New Order headlined a festival at Portmeirion in North Wales and festival organisers recruited the support of the local Brythoniaid Male Voice Choir to produce a cover version and accompanying video.

== Legacy and influence ==
In the decades since its release, "Blue Monday" has been commonly cited as one of the greatest songs of all time. In 2015, LA Weekly ranked it number 12 in their list of "The 20 Best Dance Music Tracks in History". In 2020, Slant Magazine ranked it number 27 in their list of "The 100 Best Dance Songs of All Time". In 2022, "Blue Monday" was included in the list "The story of NME in 70 (mostly) seminal songs", at number 21. Mark Beaumont wrote that with this song, "Britain's formative alternative dance culture found its way" in the mainstream and "stayed there until the acid house explosion obliterated clubland". In 2021 and 2022, Rolling Stone included it at numbers 235 and 18 in its lists of the "500 Greatest Songs of All Time" and "200 Greatest Dance Songs of All Time". In 2025, Billboard magazine ranked it number 15 in their "The 100 Best Dance Songs of All Time".

Following its release, "Blue Monday" influenced hi-NRG-producer Bobby Orlando, the Detroit techno scene and the synth-pop duo Pet Shop Boys. In 2002, Kylie Minogue performed a mashup of "Blue Monday" and her hit single "Can't Get You Out of My Head" entitled "Can't Get Blue Monday Out of My Head" at the Brit Awards. In 2007, "Blue Monday" was interpolated for the main riff of Rihanna's song "Shut Up and Drive", with the four members of New Order receiving a co-writing credit for the song.

== Releases ==
"Blue Monday 1988"

Single by New Order
- B-side: "Beach Buggy"
- Released: 25 April 1988
- Recorded: 1982
- Length: 4:57 (7-inch); 7:10 (12-inch)
- Label: Factory
- Songwriters: Gillian Gilbert; Peter Hook; Stephen Morris; Bernard Sumner
- Producers: New Order; Quincy Jones

New Order singles chronology
"Touched by the Hand of God" (1987)	"Blue Monday 1988" (1988)	"Fine Time" (1988)

Music video
- "Blue Monday 88" on YouTube

"Blue Monday-95"
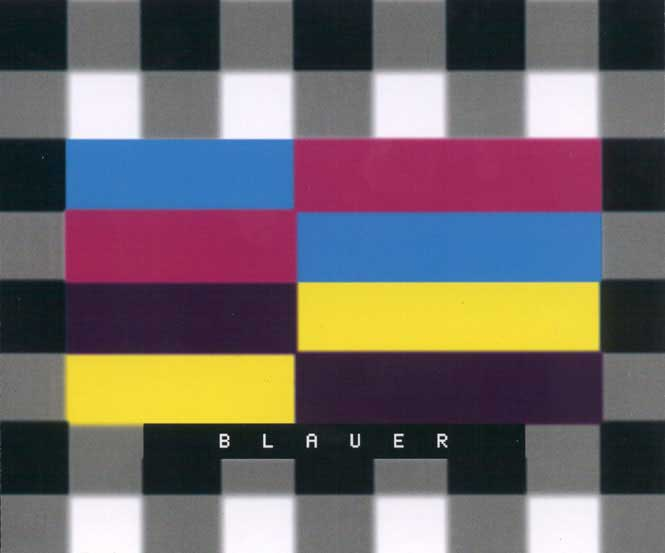

Single by New Order

from the album The Rest of New Order
- Released: 24 July 1995
- Length: 8:35
- Label: London
- Songwriters: Gillian Gilbert; Peter Hook; Stephen Morris; Bernard Sumner
- Producer: New Order

New Order singles chronology
"1963" (1995)	"Blue Monday-95" (1995)	"Video 5 8 6" (1997)

"Blue Monday" has been a hit several times in the UK. In 1983, it charted twice, initially reaching number 12 on the UK singles chart, then re-entering the chart later in the year and climbing to number 9, helped by the fact that neither side of the single (the B-side "The Beach" was an instrumental re-working of "Blue Monday", whose lyrics include the line "I thought I told you to leave me when I walked down to the beach") was featured on the UK version of the group's subsequent album, Power, Corruption & Lies. Despite selling well it was not eligible for an official gold disc because Factory Records was not a member of the British Phonographic Industry association. According to the Official Charts Company, its total sales stand at 1.16 million in the United Kingdom alone, and "Blue Monday" came 69th in the all-time UK best-selling singles chart published in November 2012. As of March 2023 total consumed units across all formats have reached 2 million units sold in United Kingdom.

New Order appeared on the BBC's Top of the Pops, on 31 March 1983, to promote the song. New Order insisted on performing "Blue Monday" live. The performance was dogged by technical problems, and was unrepresentative of the recording. In the words of Morris, "Blue Monday was never the easiest song to perform, anyway, and everything went wrong. The synthesisers went awry. It sounded awful."

In 1985, "Blue Monday" and "Thieves Like Us" were released in Poland as a 7-inch single in a different sleeve by Tonpress under license from Factory Records and sold over 50,000 copies and reached number 5 on the year-end single chart.

=== Alternative versions ===
In 1988, "Blue Monday" was remixed by Quincy Jones and John Potoker as "Blue Monday 1988". Jones was the owner of Qwest Records, New Order's record label in the United States. The single reached number 3 on the British chart, number 4 on the Australian chart, and topped the dance chart in the United States.

A 1995 reissue, with a mix by Hardfloor as the lead track, also made the UK top 20. The song has sold 1.21 million copies in the UK as of October 2015.

=== Compilations ===
The single was not originally on Power, Corruption & Lies, but was included on the Gap Records Australia/New Zealand cassette version (though listed only on the cassette itself, not on the card), and the 1983 Qwest Records US CD version.

In 2008, Collector's Editions of all New Order's 1980s albums were released, with remastered versions of the original 12-inch "Blue Monday" and its B-side "The Beach" appearing on the Collector's Edition of Power, Corruption & Lies. Meanwhile, two versions of "Blue Monday '88" appear on the Collector's Edition of 1986's Brotherhood.

- 1987: Substance 1987 – Original 12-inch version, "The Beach"
- 1989: Substance 1989 – 1988 7-inch version (music video)
- 1994: The Best of New Order – 1988 7-inch version
- 1995: The Rest of New Order – Hardfloor Mix [note: some versions come with a disc of "Blue Monday" remixes]
- 2002: International – Original 12-inch version
- 2002: Retro – Original 12-inch version and Jam and Spoon Manuela Mix
- 2005: Singles – Original 12-inch version [note: this version omits the opening seconds] and 1988 7-inch version
- 2011: Total - Original 12-inch version
- 2016: Singles (2016 re-release) - Original 12-inch version and 1988 7-inch version
- 2023: Substance 1987 (2023 Expanded Edition) – Original 12-inch version, "The Beach", Live version
- 2026: (The Best & The Rest of) New Order – 1988 7-inch version, Hardfloor Mix, Hardfloor Dub, Hawtin Mix, Hawtin Mix 2

Compilation appearances include

- 1996 The Best...Album in the World...Ever! - New edited version of 12-inch mix (runs at 6:45 length)
- 2001 Mixmag B!g Tunes - Original 12-inch version
- 2002 Electric Dreams - Original 12-inch version
- 2008 Anthems II 1991-2009 - 1988 7-inch mix (mixed into "Chime" by Orbital)
- 2011 Arkives - Plastikman Remix
- 2021 NOW Yearbook 1983 - Original 12-inch version

== Track listing ==
All tracks are written by Gillian Gilbert, Peter Hook, Stephen Morris and Bernard Sumner.

"Blue Monday" 12-inch: FAC73 (UK) (1983)
No.	Title	Length
1.	"Blue Monday"	7:29
2.	"The Beach"	7:19

"Blue Monday 1988" 7-inch: FAC73-7 (UK)
No.	Title	Length
1.	"Blue Monday 1988"	4:09
2.	"Beach Buggy"	4:18

Blue Monday 1988

12-inch: FAC73R (UK)
No.	Title	Length
1.	"Blue Monday 1988"	7:09
2.	"Beach Buggy"	6:52

Blue Monday-95

7-inch: NUO 7 (UK)
No.	Title	Length
1.	"Blue Monday-95 (Hardfloor Radio Edit)"	4:16
2.	"Blue Monday (Original Radio Edit)" (actually "Blue Monday 1988 (7-inch)")	4:09

== Personnel ==
Personnel adapted from Song Exploder and Sound on Sound.

New Order

- Bernard Sumner – vocals, Moog Source, programming, vocoder
- Peter Hook – 6-string bass
- Stephen Morris – keyboards, programming
- Gillian Gilbert – keyboards, programming

Technical

- New Order – production
- Michael Johnson – engineering
- Barry Sage and Mark Boyne – assistants

== Charts ==
=== Weekly charts ===
==== "Blue Monday" ====
Chart (1983–1985)	Peak position
Australia (Kent Music Report)	13
Austria (Ö3 Austria Top 40)	4
Belgium (Ultratop 50 Flanders)	7
Belgium (VRT Top 30 Flanders)	7
France (SNEP)	38
Ireland (IRMA)	4
Netherlands (Dutch Top 40); With "The Beach"	3
New Zealand (Recorded Music NZ)	2
Switzerland (Schweizer Hitparade)	10
UK Singles (OCC)	9
UK Indie (OCC)	1
US Hot Dance Club Play (Billboard)	5
West Germany (Official German Charts)	2

==== "Blue Monday 1988" ====
Chart (1988)	Peak position
Australia (ARIA)	4
Belgium (Ultratop 50 Flanders)	14
Belgium (VRT Top 30 Flanders)	6
Europe (Eurochart Hot 100)	6
Finland (Suomen virallinen lista)	11
Ireland (IRMA)	2
Netherlands (Dutch Top 40)	5
Netherlands (Single Top 100)	4
New Zealand (RIANZ)	1
Switzerland (Schweizer Hitparade)	9
UK Singles (OCC)	3
UK Indie (OCC)	1
US Billboard Hot 100	68
US Cash Box Top 100	75
US Hot Dance Club Play (Billboard) with "Touched by the Hand of God"	1
US Hot Dance Music/Maxi-Singles Sales (Billboard) with "Touched by the Hand of God"	9
West Germany (GfK)	3

==== "Blue Monday-95" ====
Chart (1995)	Peak position
Australia (ARIA)	109
Finland (Suomen virallinen lista)	9
Germany (GfK)	54
Ireland (IRMA)	29
Sweden (Sverigetopplistan)	38
UK Singles (Official Charts)	17
UK Dance (Official Charts)	7

=== Year-end charts ===
==== "Blue Monday" ====
Chart (1983)	Position
Australia (Kent Music Report)	53
Belgium (Ultratop)	23
New Zealand (RIANZ)	1
Netherlands (Dutch Top 40)	28
UK Singles (OCC)	18
West Germany (Media Control)	12

Chart (1984)	Position
New Zealand (RIANZ)	11

==== "Blue Monday 1988" ====
Chart (1988)	Position
Australia (ARIA)	50
Europe (Eurochart Hot 100)	63
Netherlands (Dutch Top 40)	78
Netherlands (Single Top 100)	74
New Zealand (RIANZ)	11
UK Singles (OCC)	57
West Germany (Media Control)	41

== Certifications ==
Region	Certification	Certified units/sales
Canada (Music Canada)	Gold	50,000^{^}
Italy (FIMI)	Gold	50,000^{‡}
New Zealand (RMNZ)	2× Platinum	60,000^{‡}
Spain (Promusicae)	Gold	30,000^{‡}
United Kingdom (BPI) Sales since 2008	3× Platinum	1,800,000^{‡}
^{^} Shipments figures based on certification alone.^{‡} Sales+streaming figures based on certification alone.

== Cover versions ==
=== Orgy versions ===
"Blue Monday"

Single by Orgy

from the album Candyass
- Released: 14 December 1998
- Genre: Industrial rock; alternative metal; nu metal
- Length: 4:25
- Label: Warner Bros.; Reprise; Elementree
- Songwriters: Gillian Gilbert; Peter Hook; Stephen Morris; Bernard Sumner
- Producers: Josh Abraham; Orgy

Orgy singles chronology
"Stitches" (1998)	"Blue Monday" (1998)	"Eva" (2001)

"Blue Monday / Stitches"

Single by Orgy
- Released: 9 February 1999
- Genre: Industrial rock; alternative metal; nu metal
- Length: 48:04
- Label: Warner Bros.; Reprise; Elementree
- Songwriters: Gillian Gilbert; Peter Hook; Stephen Morris; Bernard Sumner
- Producers: Josh Abraham; Orgy

"Blue Monday" was covered by American industrial rock band Orgy as the seventh track on their debut studio album, Candyass. The song was released as the album's second single on 14 December 1998. The band reworked it into a shorter industrial rock, alternative metal and nu metal song, with heavy guitar riffs, electronic beats, and dark, moody vocals from lead singer Jay Gordon.

"Blue Monday" is the only Orgy song to appear on the Billboard Hot 100, reaching No. 56; but also peaking at No. 1 on the Dance Singles Sales and No. 5 on the Canadian Singles Charts. The song remains a fan favorite and is considered one of the band's signature tracks.

==== Background ====
In an interview with Billboard guitarist Amir Derakh said that upon working on the song they "wanted to do the original 'Blue Monday' justice" and had expected more criticism. He went on to say that they felt lucky to have covered it and that they felt it could have been something that they had written. The fact that their first major hit was a cover of the 1980s electronic dance song did not bother the band.

Their first official single of "Blue Monday" had various versions of the song. Upon its success, the band decided to include their previous single "Stitches" on the second release. With the label's support, this was an enhanced CD, featuring the song's music video, and released on 9 February 1999, which was in QuickTime format. "Blue Monday" has been made into several dance remixes, some which were produced to appeal to the underground dance club scene, and was even advertised under "Club Mix" 2000, a popular dance compilation series.

The music video for "Blue Monday" also appeared on several music television stations, and the song was also released on vinyl.

==== Release ====
"Blue Monday" charted internationally, some of which included CMJ's "Commercial Alternative Cuts" and Billboard's Alternative, Pop, and Dance song charts as well as others. The song appeared on modern rock radio stations, and was a hit on MTV; it appeared on MTV's alternative music programs 120 Minutes and TRL, in which it debuted at number eight on 22 February 1999. It also appeared in Time and Newsweek in 2000 as featured song clips. The song was perceived as the band's gateway to success, allowing them to tour in Ozzfest. and in the Family Values Tour and led to the rerelease of the song "Stitches".

The song appeared in Spin magazine's "Hits of the Year" for 1999. "Blue Monday" is also said to have helped pave the way for the cyberpunk trend, as best exemplified in the popularity of the 1999 science fiction film The Matrix, which appeared soon afterwards. In an interview of Joel Gallen in Los Angeles magazine, the music supervisors were discussing the use of Orgy's "Blue Monday" for a football scene in the film Not Another Teen Movie (2001), among others. Stating that the song "had energy", they eventually selected it for the movie, and it appeared in the soundtrack as well.

==== Critical reception ====
Professional ratings
Review scores
Source	Rating
AllMusic	2.5/5 stars
AllMusic (Blue Monday / Stitches)	2.5/5 stars

Orgy's "Blue Monday" has been called the "aggro-fied-for-the-1990s" version of New Order's song, and it is considered to be part of a resurgence of new wave covers by hard rock bands, along with Dope's cover of Dead or Alive's "You Spin Me Round (Like a Record)". Many critics attribute the success of the album Candyass to "Blue Monday", and some anticipated that Orgy would become a one-hit wonder, believing that it would be difficult for the band to follow up with another hit song.

Many critics believed it to be their best song. While the New Order song is viewed positively by the author of the comic book series Blue Monday, Chynna Clugston, in an interview she expresses dislike for the misconception that she borrowed the title for her book from Orgy's cover version rather than the original. In a January 2000 Spin interview, Buckcherry's vocalist Josh Todd and guitarist Keith Nelson did not speak highly of the song, likening its sound to a Nine Inch Nails rip-off and calling the sound "mechanical".

==== Track listing ====
Blue Monday (single)
No.	Title	Mix	Length
1.	"Blue Monday"	Radio Edit	3:48
2.	"Blue Monday"	Album Version	4:26
3.	"Blue Monday"	Club 69	8:45
4.	"Blue Monday"	Club 69 Dub	8:14
5.	"Blue Monday"	Optical Vocal	6:33

Information on Blue Monday (single).

Blue Monday/Stitches
No.	Title	Mix	Length
1.	"Blue Monday"	Single	4:29
2.	"Blue Monday"	Optical Vocal	6:40
3.	"Stitches"	Green Velvet	6:13
4.	"Blue Monday"	Club 69	8:43
5.	"Blue Monday"	Club 69 Dub	8:13
6.	"Blue Monday"	Optical Instrumental	6:41
7.	"Blue Monday"	DJ Dan Remix	9:32

Information on "Blue Monday" and "Stitches".

==== Weekly charts ====
Chart (1998–1999)	Peak position
Australia (ARIA)	36
Canadian Singles Chart	5
CMJ Commercial Alternative Charts	4
Germany (GfK)	83
New Zealand (Recorded Music NZ)	30
US Billboard Hot 100	56
US Billboard Hot 100 Singles Sales	30
US Billboard Hot Dance Club Play	2
US Billboard Hot Dance Music/Maxi-Singles Sales	1
US Alternative Airplay (Billboard)	4
US Mainstream Rock Airplay (Billboard)	18
US Billboard Top 40 Mainstream	32

==== Year-end charts ====
Chart (2001)	Position
Canada (Nielsen SoundScan)	176

=== Flunk version ===
"Blue Monday"

Single by Flunk

from the album Blue Monday
- Released: 8 April 2002 (Norway); 3 June 2002 (UK and various)
- Genre: Electronic
- Label: Beatservice; BS053 (CD)
- Songwriters: Gillian Gilbert; Peter Hook; Stephen Morris; Bernard Sumner

Flunk singles chronology
"2002" (Miss World)	"Blue Monday" (2002)	"On My Balcony" (2004)

Flunk covered the song and released it as a single in 2002. In this version, Flunk slows down "Blue Monday", making it a popular hit for Flunk, based in part on the song's wide recognition. The lyrics become the focus for this version rather than the danceable beat (which was emphasized in the original version). The single received generally positive reviews by electronic music critics, but Mallory O'Donnell of Stylus Magazine commented that Flunk "only showed the paucity of melody" of the original New Order song. The song was subsequently remixed, with at least 7 remixes along with the original version available. The original release was on the 2002 EP titled Blue Monday.

==== Appearances ====
- Walking Tall (2004)
- Nancy Drew (2007)
- Wonder Woman 1984 (2020)

==== 2002 EP track listing ====
1. "Blue Monday"
2. "Eight Days a Freak"
3. "Blue Monday" (Howard Maple Mess Up Mix)

== Sources ==
- Bessman, Jim (23 September 2000). "Orgy Expands on Elemtree's 'Vapor'". Billboard. Vol. 112, no. 39. Nielsen Business Media, Inc. p. 138. ISSN 0006-2510.
- "Billboard". Billboard. Vol. 112, no. 10. Nielsen Business Media, Inc. 4 March 2000. p. 132. ISSN 0006-2510.
- Brusca, Donny (2006). BPM List 2006: Main Edition. Lulu.com. p. 700. ISBN 978-1-84728-860-8.
- Clover, Joshua (November 2000). "Jukebox Culture". Spin. Vol. 16, no. 11. p. 224. ISSN 0886-3032.
- "Commercial Alternative Cuts". CMJ New Music Report. Vol. 57, no. 604. 8 February 1999. p. 60. ISSN 0890-0795.
- Hadden, Briton; et al. (2000). "Time". Time. Vol. 155. ISSN 0040-781X. OCLC 1767509.
- Hay, Carla (6 February 1999). "Elemtree's Orgy Hits with '80s cover". Billboard. Vol. 111, no. 6. Nielsen Business Media, Inc. p. 84. ISSN 0006-2510.
- Jackman, Ian (2000). TRL: The Ultimate Fan Guide. Simon and Schuster. p. 144. ISBN 0-7434-1850-6.
- Kenneally, Tim (March 1999). "Just can't get enough: Orgy are, like, totally awesome 80's". Spin. Vol. 15, no. 3. p. 164. ISSN 0886-3032.
- Kenneally, Tim (January 2000). "Buckcherry's Jukebox Jury". Spin. Vol. 16, no. 1. p. 144. ISSN 0886-3032.
- Melton, Mary (December 2001). "Burden of Spoof". Los Angeles. Vol. 46, no. 12. Emmis Communications. p. 192. ISSN 1522-9149.
- Richardson (November 2000). "Orgy". CMJ New Music Monthly. No. 87. p. 112. ISSN 1074-6978.
- Shirley, Ian (2005). Can Rock & Roll Save the World?: An Illustrated History of Music and Comics. SAF Publishing Ltd. p. 256. ISBN 0-946719-80-2.
- Strousse, Jean; et al. (2000). "Newsweek". Newsweek. Vol. 135, no. 10–17. ISSN 0028-9604. OCLC 1760328.
- Udo, Tommy (2002). Brave Nu World. Sanctuary. p. 255. ISBN 978-1-86074-415-0.
- Whitburn, Joel (2003). Joel Whitburn's Rock Tracks: Mainstream Rock 1981–2002: Modern Rock, 1988–2002: Bonus Section! Classic Rock Tracks, 1964–1980. Record Research. p. 335. ISBN 0-89820-153-5.
