= Vapor Transmission =

Studio album by Orgy
- Released: October 10, 2000
- Studios: N.R.G. Studios and Scream Studios, Los Angeles, California
- Genres: Electronic rock; industrial rock; nu metal
- Length: 53:57
- Labels: Elementree; Reprise
- Producers: Orgy; David Kahne; Josh Abraham

Orgy chronology
Candyass (1998)	Vapor Transmission (2000)	Punk Statik Paranoia (2004)

Singles from Vaper Transmission
- 1. "Eva" Released: 2001

Professional ratings
Aggregate scores
Source	Rating
Metacritic	60/100
Review scores
Source	Rating
AllMusic	4/5 stars
Alternative Press	5/5 stars
Billboard	(positive)
Entertainment Weekly	B−
Kerrang!	2/5 stars
Metal Hammer	4/10
NME	4/10
Rolling Stone	3/5 stars
Spin	6/10
The Village Voice	C

Vapor Transmission is the second album by American rock band Orgy. It was released on October 10, 2000.

The first 1000 pressings (as well as the Japanese release) of the album included a bonus track known as "The Spectrum", which starts at the 6 minute mark of the last track "Where's Gerrold". Some packages of this album included an enhanced CD that contained a demo version of the song "Stitches," a remix, and a video for the single "Fiction (Dreams in Digital)". The aforementioned single received significant radio play upon release, reaching number 6 on the Hot Modern Rock Tracks chart. A second single, "Opticon", had more moderate success, and was featured on the soundtrack to the 2001 horror film Valentine. According to vocalist Jay Gordon, the song contains a drum sample from "The Stroke" by Billy Squier. "Suckerface" and "Eva" were also released as promotional singles.

Vapor Transmission largely continues the style heard on Candyass. However, while the electronic effects remain prominent, heavily distorted guitars are slightly de-emphasized with a strong focus on melody.

== Track listing ==
No.	Title	Length
1.	"Vapor Transmission (Intro)"	2:16
2.	"Suckerface"	3:26
3.	"The Odyssey"	2:57
4.	"Opticon"	2:57
5.	"Fiction (Dreams in Digital)"	3:24
6.	"Eva"	4:59
7.	"107"	4:16
8.	"Dramatica"	3:34
9.	"Eyes-Radio-Lies"	4:02
10.	"Saving Faces"	4:07
11.	"Re-Creation"	3:34
12.	"Chasing Sirens"	4:02
13.	"Where's Gerrold"	4:13
Total length:		47:35

Early pressing version
No.	Title	Length
13.	"Where's Gerrold" (Contains "The Spectrum" as a hidden track at 6:11)	10:33
Total length:		53:57

- "The Spectrum" was later featured on the compilation album MTV: The Return of the Rock, Vol. 2.
- "The Spectrum" was later re-released as a standalone single on streaming and digital download services.
- Another song recorded during these sessions was "Sonic", among other demos.

== Personnel ==
Band

- Jay Gordon - lead vocals, engineering
- Ryan Shuck - guitars, backing vocals
- Amir Derakh - keyboards, backing vocals, engineering
- Paige Haley - bass, backing vocals
- Bobby Hewitt - drums, backing vocals

Additional musicians

- Torry Shaun - additional vocals on "Where's Gerrold"
- Melanie Cockrum - spoken vocals on "Vapor Transmission (Intro)"
- Josh Abraham - additional guitar, additional programming and keyboards on "Fiction (Dreams In Digital)", background vocals, production, engineering
- Chris Hager - additional guitar on "Where's Gerrold"
- Jimbo Barker - additional guitar on "Chasing Sirens"
- Troy Van Leeuwen - additional guitar on "Fiction (Dreams In Digital)" and "Re-Creation"
- Anthony Valcic - additional programming and keyboards on "Fiction (Dreams In Digital)", additional programming on "Saving Faces", engineering
- Kenny Pierce - additional drums on "The Odyssey"
- Toddy Allen - additional drums on "The Odyssey" and "Chasing Sirens"
- Judd Kalish - additional programming on "Dramatica"
- Elijah Blue Allman - additional vocals and production on "The Spectrum"
- Wylie Biechler (uncredited) - additional vocals and production on "The Spectrum"

== Charts ==
Chart (2000)	Peak position
US Billboard 200	16

== Certifications ==
Region	Certification	Certified units/sales
United States (RIAA)	Gold	500,000^{^}
^{^} Shipments figures based on certification alone.
