= Stahlmusik =

Studio album by Einstürzende Neubauten
- Released: October 1980
- Recorded: 1 June 1980 ("in a highway driveway")
- Length: 38:53
- Label: Eisengrau
- Producer: Einstürzende Neubauten

Einstürzende Neubauten chronology
Stahlmusik (1980)	Kollaps (1981)

Stahlmusik is the debut album of the German Industrial band Einstürzende Neubauten. One of the earliest and rarest Neubauten albums, Stahlmusik was recorded live-to-tape in a pillar of the Stadtautobahn Bridge in West Berlin on June 1, 1980, and was released on cassette in October via Blixa Bargeld's "Eisengrau" shop, where the earliest incarnations of the band would often rehearse. Musically, the sound of the album is more conventional than the band's next album, Kollaps, mainly because percussionist N.U. Unruh had not yet abandoned his drum-kit for the miscellaneous scrap metal of later releases; The songs are more akin to the material on the double 7" set Kalte Sterne, released prior to Kollaps but nearly a year after Stahlmusik; in particular, Schwarz.

A version of "Für den Untergang" from these sessions appeared as "Stahlversion" on the B-side of the Für den Untergang 7", and was later reissued on Strategies Against Architecture 80-83.

== Track listing ==
1. "Energie" – 6:19
2. "Eisenmolekül" – 3:20
3. "Alphabet" – 4:46
4. "Tier" – 5:21
5. "Schönheit der Geschwindigkeit" – 2:16
6. "Arbeit" – 1:12
7. "Kein Bestandteil Sein" – 9:25
8. "Kristallines Eisen" – 0:51
9. "Gut (mit dem Kopf an die Wand)" – 5:22

== Personnel ==
Einstürzende Neubauten

- Blixa Bargeld – guitar, vocals, noises
- N.U. Unruh – percussion, noises, vocals on "Alphabet"
