= Punk Statik Paranoia =

Studio album by Orgy
- Released: February 24, 2004
- Recorded: 2003–2004
- Genres: Industrial metal; nu metal
- Length: 36:56
- Label: D1 Music
- Producer: Orgy

Orgy chronology
Vapor Transmission (2000)	Punk Statik Paranoia (2004)	Talk Sick (2015)

Singles from Punk Statik Paranoia
- 1. "Vague" Released: October 12, 2004

Professional ratings
Review scores
Source	Rating
AllMusic	2/5 stars
Ultimate Guitar	6.7/10

Punk Statik Paranoia is the third album by rock band Orgy. It was released on February 24, 2004, their first independent recording.

The album's style is a departure from the electronic rock sound that was present in Candyass and Vapor Transmission, leaning more into industrial music.

There are four different versions of the album, the final release in 2004 and an advance version used for promotion dated to 2003, each of which have an explicit and clean variant. The advance versions are missing some elements that were added before the final release. All versions feature the same track list.

== Sales and chart performance ==
Punk Statik Paranoia debuted at #11 on the Billboard Independent Albums chart. The album sold 5,353 copies during its first week of release.

== Track listing ==
No.	Title	Length
1.	"Beautiful Disgrace"	4:13
2.	"Vague"	4:52
3.	"Ashamed"	4:03
4.	"Make Up Your Mind"	4:00
5.	"Leave Me Out"	3:53
6.	"The Obvious"	4:12
7.	"Inside My Head"	4:16
8.	"Pure"	3:47
9.	"Can't Take This"	4:15
Total length:		36:56

== Personnel ==
Band

- Jay Gordon - lead vocals, additional guitar, bass, drums, keys, programming
- Amir Derakh - lead guitar, synth, programming, arrangements
- Ryan Shuck - rhythm guitar, backing vocals, programming
- Paige Haley - bass, backing vocals, additional guitars
- Bobby Hewitt - drums, programming

Additional Musicians

- John Magness - drums, programming, synth
- Wylie Biechler - guitars, vocals, programming
- Troy Van Leeuwen - guitar (track 6)
- Rik Gordon - vocals (tracks 4, 9)
- Chris "Shred" Landrum - background vocals (track 2)
- Mike Hegedus - background vocals (track 2)

Production

- Doug Trantow - engineering, mixing
- Jay Gordon - engineering, mixing
- Amir Derakh - engineering, mixing, Pro Tools file arrangements
- Jeromy "Air Jer" Holding - engineering
- Brandon "Brando" Belski - engineering
- Chris Rakestraw - engineering
- Jim Goodwin - engineering, mixing
- Jermeal Hicks - engineering
- Tom Baker - mastering
