= Orgy (band) =

American rock band

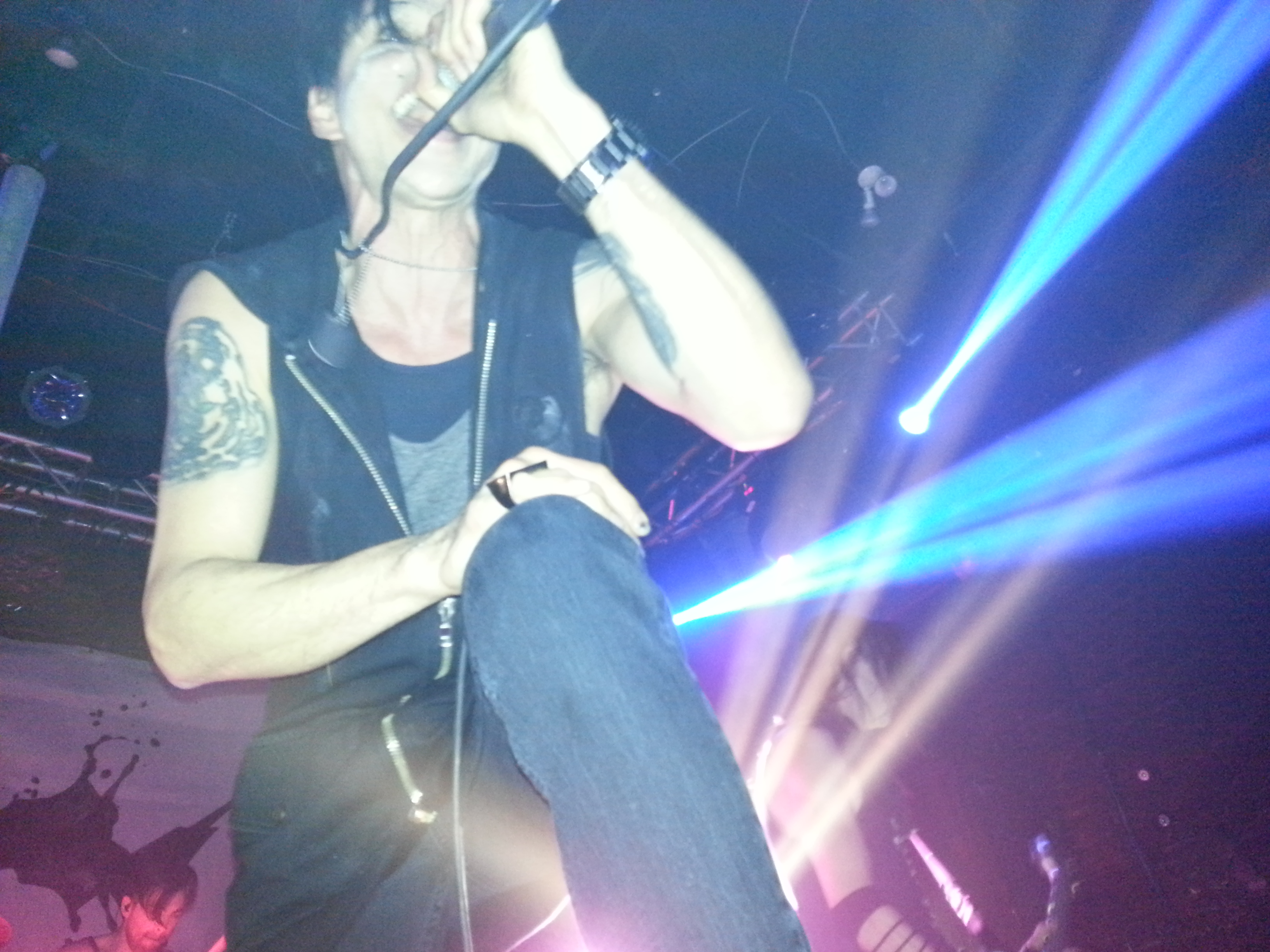
- Orgy performing in 2015

Background information
- Origin: Los Angeles, California, U.S.
- Genres: Electronic rock; gothic rock; industrial rock; nu metal
- Years active: 1997–2005, 2010–present
- Labels: Elementree; Reprise; D1
- Spinoffs: Julien-K; Dead by Sunrise
- Spinoff of: Deadsy
- Members: Jay Gordon; Nic Speck; Carlton Bost; Tommy Rockoff; Ilia Yordanov
- Past members: Ryan Shuck; Amir Derakh; Paige Haley; Bobby Hewitt; Jamie Miller; Ashburn Miller; Bobby Amaro; Creighton Emrick; Ty Oliver; Márton Veress
- Website: orgymusic.com

Orgy is an American rock band formed in 1997, from Los Angeles, California. The band is best known for their cover version of the New Order song "Blue Monday", and their original song "Stitches", both from their 1998 album Candyass. In 2000, they released their second album, Vapor Transmission, with "Fiction (Dreams in Digital)", "Opticon", and "Eva" as singles.

== History ==
=== Early years (1997) ===
Orgy was formed in 1997 by vocalist Jay Gordon and guitarists Amir Derakh and Ryan Shuck. Bassist Paige Haley and drummer Bobby Hewitt soon completed the line-up. Derakh had previously gained some fame in the 1980s metal band Rough Cutt, and Hewitt was a former member of Electric Love Hogs. Gordon played bass in Deadsy due to the lack of a bass player, on their unreleased self-titled album, splitting roles with his friend and the lead singer, Elijah Blue Allman. He then left Deadsy, to form Orgy. The band's name was meant to be a reference to the eclectic mix of genres the band was producing, rather than the sexual act directly; according to Shifty Shellshock, the inspiration came from a 1-800 telephone number on TV. Gordon and Derakh were also experienced producers, having produced Coal Chamber's self-titled album.

In 1997, Jonathan Davis, who performed with Shuck in Sexart, signed Orgy as the first act on Korn's label, Elementree Records, which at the time had distribution with Reprise Records.

=== Candyass and Vapor Transmission (1998–2001) ===
In 1998, Orgy released their debut album, Candyass, the name inspired by a drag queen they had met. The album sold almost two million copies and produced two singles: a cover of the New Order song "Blue Monday", and "Stitches". Both charted on Total Request Live. The song "Revival" featured Jonathan Davis.

Orgy made their live debut at EdgeFest, an annual radio show in Tulsa, Oklahoma, in 1998. They also appeared on the Family Values Tour with Korn, Limp Bizkit, Ice Cube, Incubus, and Rammstein. They were featured on the live compilation album of the tour, released in 1999. Other tours with Love and Rockets and Sugar Ray followed.

Their second album, the science fiction-themed Vapor Transmission, was released in 2000, with "Fiction (Dreams in Digital)" and "Opticon" as singles.

=== Side work and Punk Statik Paranoia (2001–2005) ===
In 2001, Orgy released the song "Faces" for the soundtrack of the film Zoolander. The band was a musical guest in the television series Charmed, performing "Opticon" in the episode "Sin Francisco".

In 2003, a snippet of their song "Ashamed" was featured in the movie Freaky Friday. The band's guitarist, Amir Derakh, had a cameo in the film as well. He also helped coach Jamie Lee Curtis for her guitar scene in the film.

In late 2003, guitarists Shuck and Derakh formed a side project, Julien-K, as an outlet for electronic material they had come up with during the writing process for Orgy. Jay Gordon also remixed the Linkin Park track "Points of Authority" for their album Reanimation, where it was renamed "Pts.of.Athrty".

After touring in support of Vapor Transmission, Orgy began working on a new album and a live DVD in mid to late 2002, but both of these were pushed back to mid 2003. Eventually, the band left Reprise Records and Elementree, taking the band's already recorded material with them. Explaining the split from the label in an interview to PopGurls.com:

"We just couldn't get it together with them to get the record going and they weren't dropping us. So we finally managed to get let out of our contract and got the stuff that we had already recorded." -Amir Derakh

Jay Gordon and his father, Lou, would start their own independent record label, D1 Music, and the label finally released the band's third album, Punk Statik Paranoia, in February 2004. In August of the following year, a live DVD, Trans Global Spectacle, was released.

Following touring in support of Punk Statik Paranoia, the band went on hiatus in late 2005.

=== Hiatus (2005–2012) ===
When asked for an Orgy update in late July 2008, Shuck informed fans that Orgy's return is still underway but their priority is getting the much delayed Julien-K album released. During a video interview at the NAMM Show in 2009, Derakh mentioned a 2010 Orgy reunion.

Shuck and Derakh released their first album as Julien-K, titled Death to Analog, in March 2009. In the same year, they also released an album with Chester Bennington of Linkin Park under the name Dead by Sunrise.

On October 25, 2010, Ryan Shuck and Amir Derakh stated on the Julien-K blog: "As of Oct. 26th we will no longer be part of Orgy. Jay will continue making music without the original members."

On October 30, 2010, Jay Gordon released a statement via his official Facebook profile stating that he still owns the Orgy name and wants to continue forth creating new material for the band. Gordon wrote that all previous members of the band were too busy with numerous side projects to continue with the original band. "Everyone has been so busy with their different projects I figured this was the only way for me to continue on with the name. I started this band, and I don't want to let it fall to the wayside completely."

On November 7, 2011, Blabbermouth.net published a news story detailing the bitter feud between Gordon and guitarists Shuck and Derakh, that had spiraled out of control after Gordon revealed his plans to assemble a band of musicians and begin touring under the name Orgy.

=== Return with new lineup (2012–present) ===
On February 3, 2012, it was announced that Orgy would embark on a five-week run titled the Bad Blood Tour. Gordon was the only original member of Orgy appearing on this tour.

On August 4, 2012, Orgy linked to a 30-second demo of a new song, "Grime of the Century", via their Twitter and Facebook page. The song "Grime of the Century" was later made available on iTunes and the new Orgy website.

In 2013, Orgy embarked on the Wide Awake and Dead Tour with Vampires Everywhere! and Davey Suicide.

Orgy launched a crowdfunding campaign in August 2013 via Indiegogo.com with a $100,000 goal. Two months later, at the conclusion of the campaign, the band had only raised $8,739, falling 92% short of their goal.

On February 23, 2014, the band announced through their official website that the new single "Wide Awake and Dead" will be available through iTunes and Amazon on March 18, 2014. The "Wide Awake and Dead" video was filmed on April 22.

In 2015, they released their first collection of new music in 11 years, an EP titled Talk Sick. Originally, it was to be followed with another EP titled Entropy, but Gordon later told Westword Magazine the band would instead release it as a full-length album, that has yet to materialize.

The band performed at the 2023 edition of the Sick New World festival; their appearance drew criticism as the band appeared to heavily use playback instead of a live performance.

In 2026, Orgy embarked on the 21 date Freaks on Parade tour across North America, in support of The Hu, and co-headliners Marilyn Manson, and Rob Zombie.

== Musical style ==
Orgy described their music as "death pop", though critics and journalists categorized the band's music as electronic rock, gothic rock, industrial rock, alternative metal, industrial metal, hard rock and glam metal. While sometimes described as nu metal, this was contested by New Noise Magazine and Vice, who said that Orgy was not a nu metal band. New Noise Magazine placed the band as being part of a short lived movement in rock music which the magazine called "Undercore", a synthesis of glam, goth and synth-rock with science fiction. Vice said that the band's "goth/freak" aesthetic would be better categorized as "nu wave" rather than nu metal. NME wrote, "if many of their contemporaries sound like metal bands with a fetish for the new romantics, Orgy are more like a new romantic band who’ve decided to make themselves more marketable and turned up the guitars".

== Band members ==
Current members

- Jay Gordon – lead vocals (1997–2005, 2010–present)
- Nic Speck – bass, backing vocals (2010–present)
- Carlton Bost – lead guitar, backing vocals (2011–present)
- Tommy "the Villain" Rockoff – drums (2023–present)
- Ilia Yordanov – rhythm guitar, backing vocals (2018–2024; 2025–present)

Former members

- Ryan Shuck – rhythm guitar, backing vocals (1997–2005, 2010)
- Amir Derakh – lead guitar, keyboards (1997–2005, 2010)
- Bobby Hewitt – drums (1997–2005)
- Paige Haley – bass (1997–2005)
- Ashburn Miller – rhythm guitar, keyboards (2011–2013)
- Jamie Miller – drums (2010–2013)
- Bobby Amaro – drums (2013–2019)
- Creighton Emrick – rhythm guitar (2013–2022)
- Márton Veress – drums (2019–2023)
- Ty Oliver – rhythm guitar, backing vocals (2024–2025)

Former touring musicians

- Raanen Bozzio – drums (2018)
- Ryan Browne – drums (2018)

== Related projects ==
- Julien-K – an electronic rock group founded by Derakh and Shuck in 2003. Their album Death to Analog was released on March 10, 2009.
- Dead by Sunrise – a band founded by Linkin Park's Chester Bennington, Amir Derakh, and Ryan Shuck
- Hellflower – a band founded by a longtime friend and Director of Activities Church, including Haley
- The Wondergirls – a band founded by Jay Gordon, and Ryan Shuck alongside Stone Temple Pilots frontman Scott Weiland.
- kill-o-watt – Gordon's dubstep side project
- Lunarclick – a band formed by Carlton Bost
- Ashesdead – a band formed by Ashburn Miller
- Sexart – a band formed by Ryan Shuck and Korn frontman Jonathan Davis
- Machine Gun Orchestra – Side project formed by Jay Gordon and Mike Cox from Coal Chamber.
- Sins of A Divine Mother – a band founded by Wylie Biechler and John Magness who worked with Orgy on their 2004 record Punk Statik Paranoia

== Discography ==
=== Studio albums ===
List of studio albums, with selected chart positions and certifications
Title	Details	Peak chart positions			Sales	Certifications
Title	Details	US	US Heat.	US Ind.	Sales	Certifications
Candyass	Released: August 18, 1998; Label: Elementree, Reprise; Formats: CD, CS, digital download	32	1	—	US: 1,163,898+	RIAA: Platinum; MC: Gold
Vapor Transmission	Released: October 10, 2000; Label: Elementree, Reprise; Formats: CD, CS, digital download	16	—	—	US: 319,759+	RIAA: Gold
Punk Statik Paranoia	Released: February 24, 2004; Label: D1 Music; Formats: CD, digital download	—	—	11	US: 150,000+	
"—" denotes a recording that did not chart or was not released in that territory.

=== EPs ===
List of EPs
Title	Details
Talk Sick	Released: March 23, 2015; Label: D1 Music; Formats: CD, vinyl, digital download

=== Singles ===
List of singles, with selected chart positions, showing year released and album name
Title	Year	Peak chart positions								Album
Title	Year	US	US Alt.	US Dance	US Main. Rock	AUS	CAN	GER	NZ	Album
"Stitches"	1998	—	18	—	38	—	—	—	—	Candyass
"Blue Monday"	1998	56	4	2	18	36	5	83	30	Candyass
"Eva"	2001	—	—	—	—	—	—	—	—	Vapor Transmission
"Faces"	2001	—	—	—	—	—	—	—	—	Zoolander soundtrack
"Vague"	2004	—	—	—	—	—	—	—	—	Punk Statik Paranoia
"Grime of the Century"	2012	—	—	—	—	—	—	—	—	Non-album single
"Wide Awake and Dead"	2014	—	—	—	—	—	—	—	—	Talk Sick
"Army to Your Party" (featuring Crichy Crich)	2018	—	—	—	—	—	—	—	—	Non-album single
"Spells"	2020	—	—	—	—	—	—	—	—	Talk Sick
"Karma Kastles"	2021	—	—	—	—	—	—	—	—	Non-album single
"Shady AF" (featuring Rexi XO)	2022	—	—	—	—	—	—	—	—	Non-album single
"Empty"	2023	—	—	—	—	—	—	—	—	Non-album single
"Ghost" (featuring Joey Scream)	2023	—	—	—	—	—	—	—	—	Non-album single
"Nails" (with Nathan James)	2025	—	—	—	—	—	—	—	—	Non-album single
"—" denotes a recording that did not chart or was not released in that territory.

=== Promotional singles ===
List of promotional singles, with selected chart positions, showing year released and album name
Title	Year	Peak chart positions								Album
Title	Year	US	US Alt.	US Dance	US Main. Rock	AUS	CAN	GER	NZ	Album
"Fiction (Dreams in Digital)"	2000	—	6	—	38	—	—	—	—	Vapor Transmission
"Opticon"	2000	—^{[A]}	26	25	—	—	—	—	—	Vapor Transmission
"Suckerface"	2000	—	—	—	—	—	—	—		Vapor Transmission
"The Obvious"	2003	—	—	—	—	—	—	—	—	Punk Statik Paranoia
"Pure"	2005	—	—	—	—	—	—	—	—	Punk Statik Paranoia
"—" denotes a recording that did not chart or was not released in that territory.

=== Music videos ===
Year	Song	Director
1998	"Blue Monday"	Gregory Dark
1999	"Stitches"	Rocky Morton
2000	"Fiction (Dreams in Digital)"	Nic Mathieu
2001	"Opticon"	
2004	"Vague"	
2012	"Grime of the Century"	
2014	"Wide Awake and Dead"	BenMarc
2020	"Spells"	Mykyta Samusiev

== Notes ==
- A "Opticon" did not enter the Billboard Hot 100, but peaked at number 56 on the Hot Singles Sales chart.
