= Sehnsucht (Strauss) =

- Lied by Richard Strauss
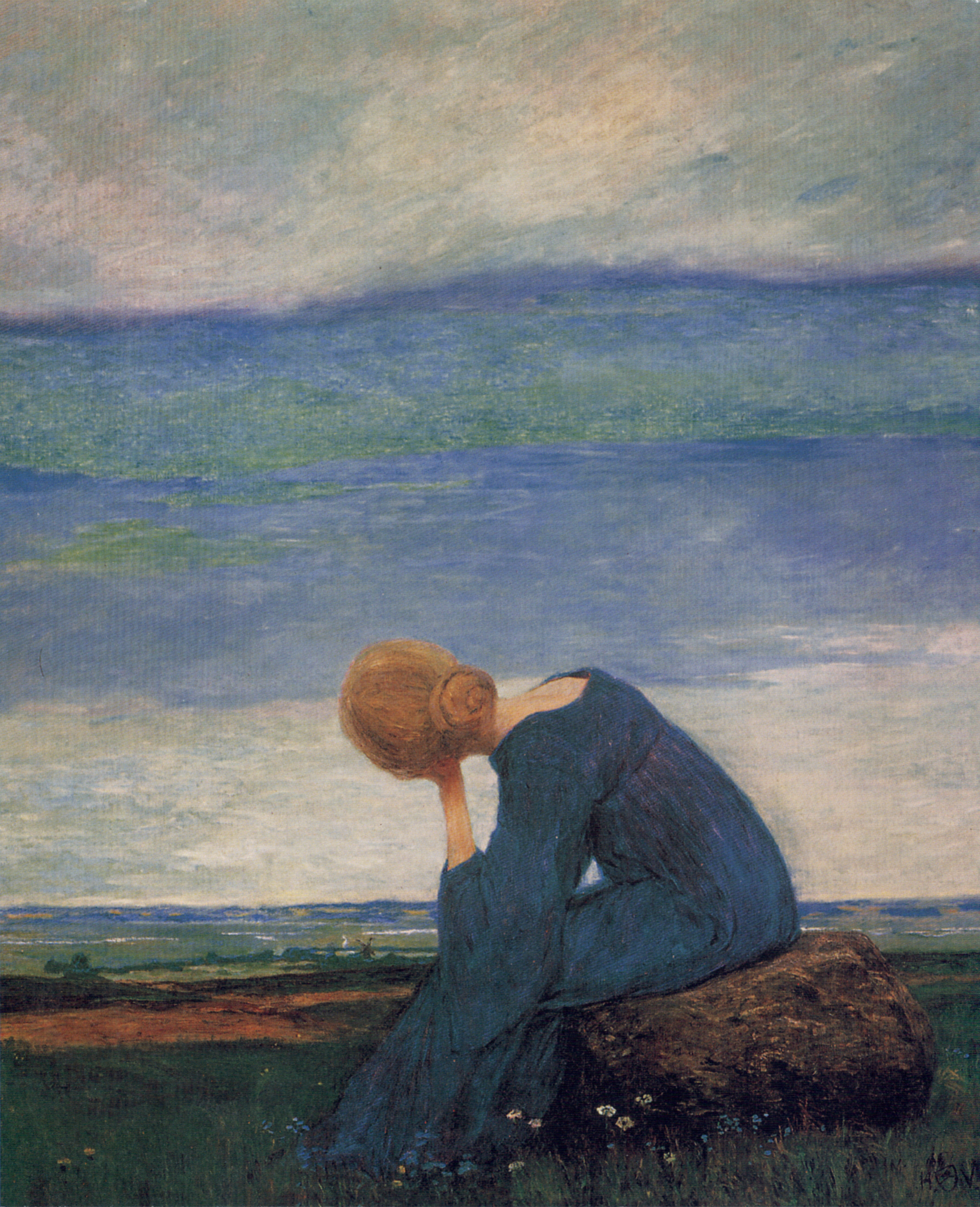
- Sehnsucht by Heinrich Vogeler (1900)
- English: "Longing"
- Catalogue: TrV 174/II
- Opus: 32/2
- Text: Poem by Detlev von Liliencron
- Language: German
- Composed: 24 January 1896
- Dedication: Pauline de Ahna
- Scoring: Voice and piano

"Sehnsucht" ("Longing" or "Yearning") is an art song for voice and piano composed by Richard Strauss in 1896, setting a poem of the same title by the German poet Detlev von Liliencron (1844–1909). It is the second song in his collection Five songs for voice and piano, Op. 32, TrV 174.

== Composition history ==
Liliencron was twenty years older than Strauss, his father an impecunious Baron and his mother an American general's daughter, who for much of his life was in the Prussian army including active service in two wars. He was an influence on poets such as Otto Bierbaum and Rainer Maria Rilke and also the composer Hugo Wolf. Strauss was to set four songs by him, "Sehnsucht" being the first. It was composed over 2 days in January 1896 and was published in a set of five songs. Jefferson writes that "The lied is notable for the basic two-bar phrase in the piano part - really, a notable stroke, this - and of course the marvellously successful suspension, so unexpected, yet so right". Norman Del Mar wrote that:

Sehnsucht is remarkable for its complete change of mood midway in the poem and this, with its implicit musical possibilities, clearly fascinated Strauss. The lonely wanderer on the barren heath becomes obsessed with thoughts of his beloved to the point of seeing her hallucinatory image, cold in manner at first, but touched by his repeated declarations of love, ultimately with laughing, shining eyes. Strauss paints the bleak scene with an extended series of arpeggiando discords which resolve with increasingly Tristanesque poignancy. At long last, the yearning of the song's title evokes the actual image of the beloved... There is a passionate climax amidst the last repetitions of the words Ich liebe dich (I love you). But towards the end, the desolation returns, giving the impression of a lover reawakening to an unwelcome awareness of his surroundings. In the last two bars, however, he has a last fleeting vision of his beloved.

The song was premiered at Munich on 9 November 1896, along with the four other Opus 32 songs, with Strauss accompanying Raoul Walter, a lyric tenor who was resident at the Munich Royal Opera. Strauss recorded the song in 1943 for a radio broadcast from Vienna, with himself on piano with tenor Anton Dermota.

The poem has been set by several other composers, the best known being a version by Pfitzner in 1900.

== Lyrics ==
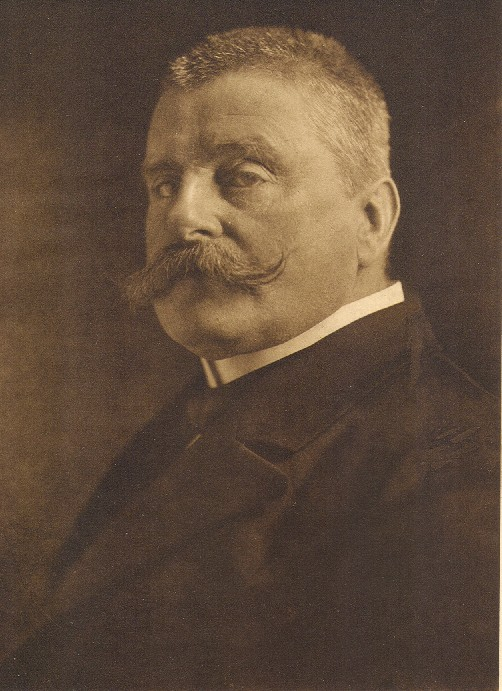
Lilienkron (1905), author of lyrics

The poem comes from Liliencron's 1890 collection Der Haidegänger (English The Heath Walker)

Sehnsucht

Ich ging den Weg entlang, der einsam lag,
Den stets allein ich gehe jeden Tag.
Die Heide schweigt, das Feld ist menschenleer;
Der Wind nur weht im Knickbusch um mich her.

Weit liegt vor mir die Straße ausgedehnt;
Es hat mein Herz nur dich, nur dich ersehnt.
Und kämest Du, ein Wunder wär's für mich,
Ich neigte mich vor dir: ich liebe dich.

Und im Begegnen, nur ein einzger Blick,
Des ganzen Lebens wär er mein Geschick.
Und richtest du dein Auge kalt auf mich,
Ich trotze Mädchen dir: ich liebe dich.

Doch wenn dein schönes Auge grüßt und lacht,
Wie eine Sonne mir in schwerer Nacht,
Ich zöge rasch dein süßes Herz an mich
Und flüstre leise dir: ich liebe dich.

Longing

I went along the lonely road,
I walk it every day, and always alone.
The heath keeps silence, the fields are deserted;
only the wind moves in the hedge before me.

The road stretches far ahead of me;
my heart has longed only for you, only you.
If you came, it would be a miracle to me,
I would bow down before you: I love you.

At a chance meeting, if you were to cast just one look
My entire life's destiny would be in that moment.
If you should look coldly upon me,
I would resist, my maiden, saying: I love you!

But if your beautiful eyes greet and laugh,
like a sun to me in heavy night,
I'd quickly draw your sweet heart to me
and softly whisper: I love you.
