= Kollaps =

Studio album by Einstürzende Neubauten
- Released: 5 October 1981
- Recorded: 1981
- Genre: Industrial, experimental
- Length: 38:58
- Label: ZickZack
- Producer: Einstürzende Neubauten

Einstürzende Neubauten chronology
Stahlmusik (1980)	Kollaps (1981)	Zeichnungen des Patienten O. T. (1983)

Kollaps is the first official LP by Einstürzende Neubauten, released in 1981 on German label ZickZack as #ZZ 65. The songs are a mixture of rough punk tunes as well as industrial noises obtained from self-made music machines, electronics, and found objects such as metal plates. The album was reissued in 2002 with Stahldubversions, originally released in 1982. Blixa Bargeld, N.U. Unruh and F.M. Einheit appear on the album. "Jet'M" is a cover of the Serge Gainsbourg song "Je t'aime... moi non plus". Track 15 of many CD versions of the album is a live recording of "Negativ Nein" from 26 June 1987 at the Tempodrom in Berlin.

== Reception ==
Professional ratings
Review scores
Source	Rating
AllMusic	4/5 stars
Spin Alternative Record Guide	9/10

Trouser Press described Kollaps as "one of the most shocking visions ever committed to vinyl." The album is included in the book 1001 Albums You Must Hear Before You Die.

== Track listing ==
1. "Tanz Debil" (Debility Dance) – 3:19
2. "Steh auf Berlin" (Wake Up Berlin) – 3:45
3. "Negativ Nein" (Negative No) – 2:24
4. "U-Haft-Muzak" (Detention Muzak) – 3:47
5. "Draußen ist Feindlich" (Outside is Hostile) – 0:47
6. "Schmerzen Hören (Hören mit Schmerzen)" (Hearing Pain (Listen with Pain)) – 2:32
7. "Jet'm" (Serge Gainsbourg) – 1:24 (appended to many versions)
8. "Kollaps" (Collapse) – 8:03
9. "Sehnsucht" (Desire) – 1:21
10. "Vorm Krieg" (Before the War) – 0:20
11. "Hirnsäge" (Brainsaw) – 1:55
12. "Abstieg & Zerfall" (Descent & Decay) – 4:28
13. "Helga" – 0:11
14. "Schieß Euch Ins Blut" (Shoot Yourself in the Blood) – 3:06 (appended to many CD versions)
15. "Negativ Nein" (live) – 4:37 (appended to many CD versions)
16. "Rohrbombe" (Pipe Bomb) – 1:02 (from Stahldubversions, appended to the 2002 re-release)
17. "Futuristischer Dub" (Futuristic Dub) – 1:03 (from Stahldubversions, appended to the 2002 re-release)
18. "Sado-Masodub" (Sadomasochistic Dub) – 3:11 (from Stahldubversions, appended to the 2002 re-release)
19. "Liebesdub" (Love Dub) – 1:29 (from Stahldubversions, appended to the 2002 re-release)
20. "Spionagedub" (Espionage Dub) – 2:12 (from Stahldubversions, appended to the 2002 re-release)
21. "Mikrobendub" (Microbes Dub) – 1:46 (from Stahldubversions, appended to the 2002 re-release)
22. "Gastarbeiterdub" (Guest Worker Dub) – 2:47 (from Stahldubversions, appended to the 2002 re-release)
23. "Rivieradub" – 2:46 (from Stahldubversions, appended to the 2002 re-release)
24. "Lünebest" – 1:58 (from Stahldubversions, appended to the 2002 re-release)

== Personnel ==
Einstürzende Neubauten

- Blixa Bargeld – lead vocals, guitars, noises
- N.U. Unruh – percussion, vocals
- F.M. Einheit – percussion, vocals
