= Sehnsucht =

German noun for an emotion of longing

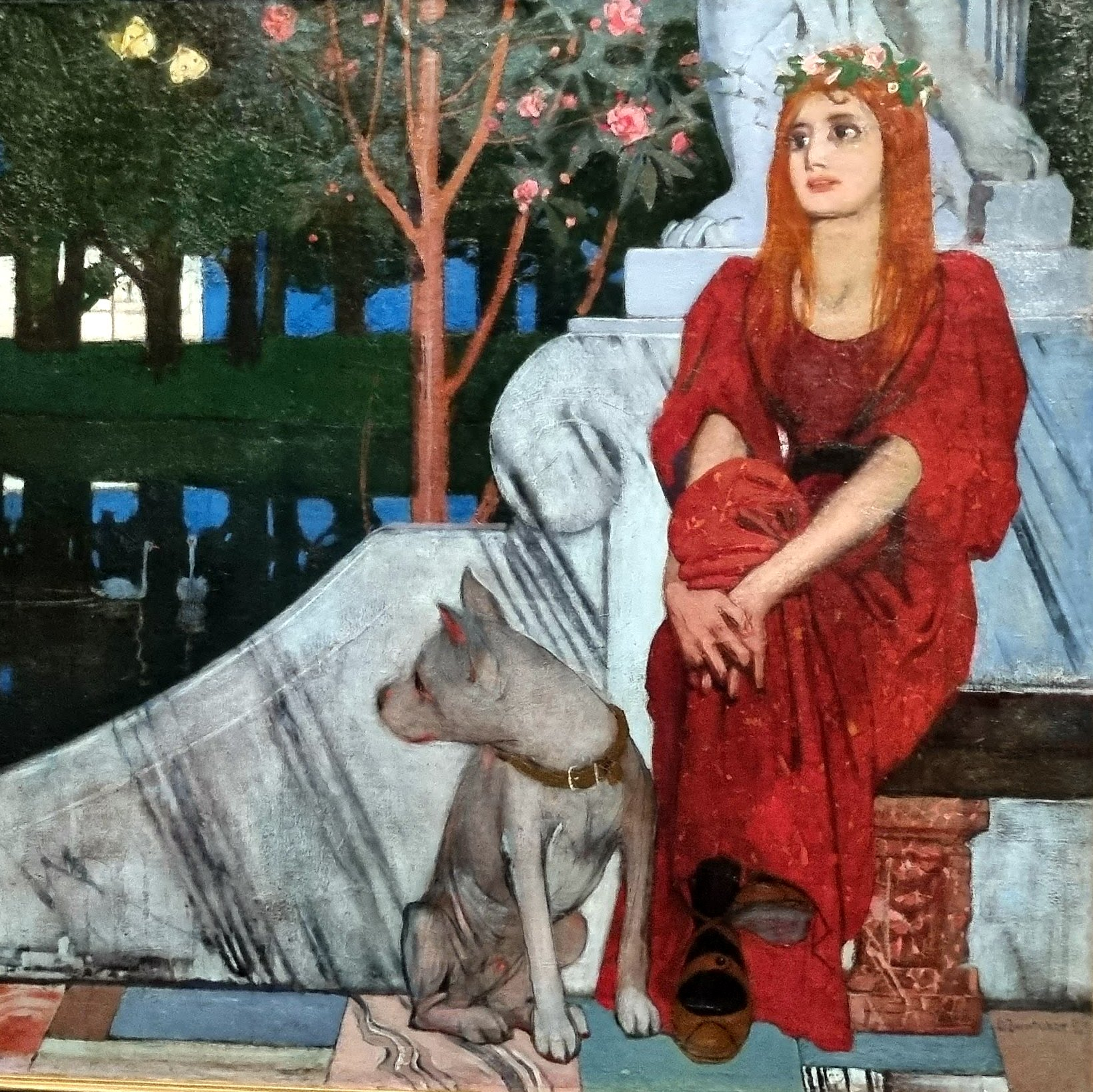
Sehnsucht by Oskar Zwintscher, c. 1900

Sehnsucht (German pronunciation: [ˈzeːnˌzʊxt]) is a German noun translated as "longing", "desire", "yearning", or "craving". Some psychologists use the word to represent thoughts and feelings about all facets of life that are unfinished or imperfect, paired with a yearning for ideal alternative experiences.

== Etymology and language change ==
A suffering reference of the word Sehnsucht in Middle High German usage is associated with "Siechtum" in the German dictionary as follows: Weakening the disease reference, the word later denoted the high "degree of a violent and often painful longing for something, especially when one has no hope of attaining what is desired, or when attainment is uncertain, still distant."

The word "Sehnsucht" is used as a Germanism in some other languages. Because of its vagueness, analogous terms cannot easily be cited. Portuguese has the similar but not identical term saudade.

== Sehnsucht in mythology ==
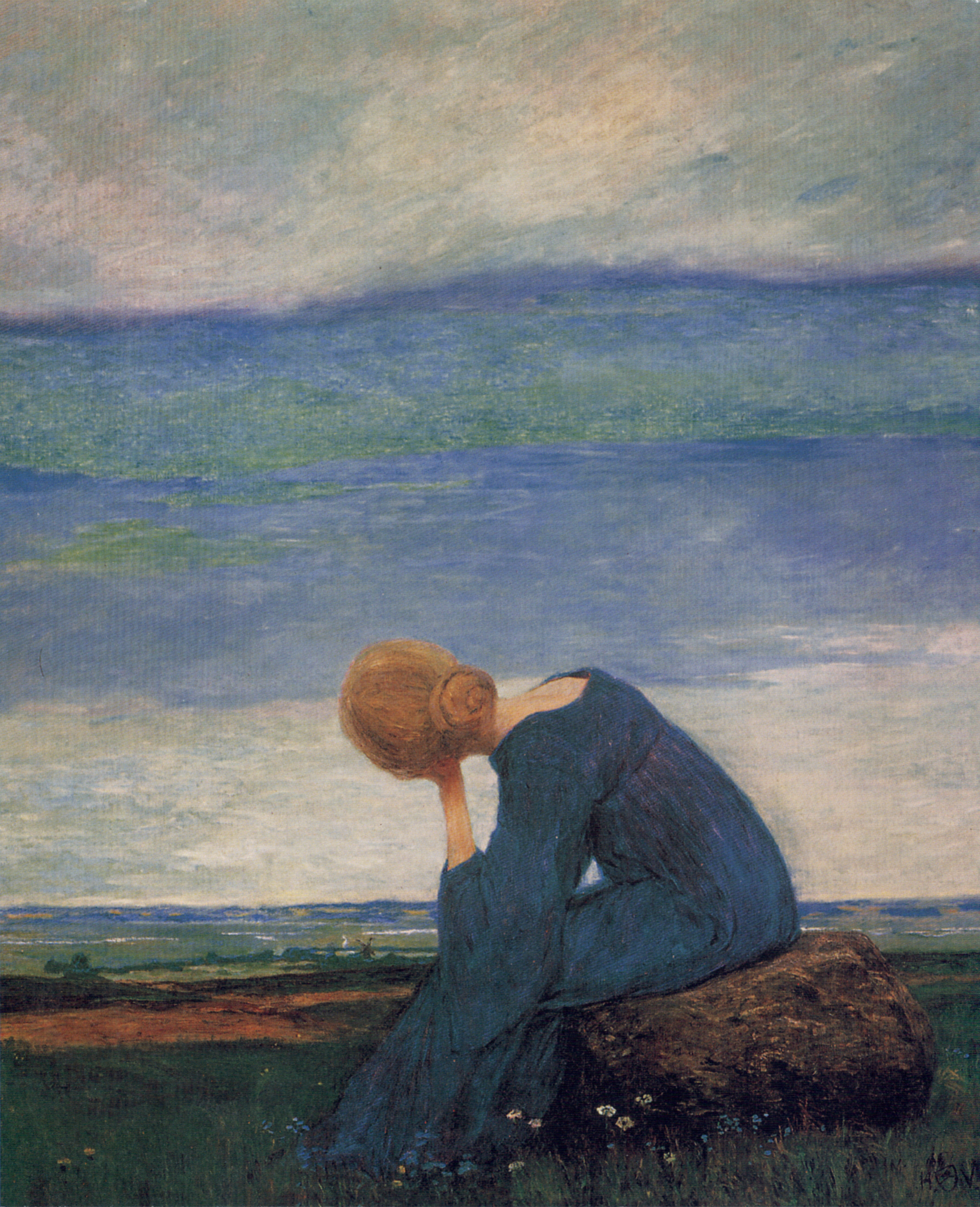
Sehnsucht (Dreaming) by Heinrich Vogeler about 1900

In Greek mythology, the Erotes are the gods of loving Sehnsucht, found with Eros in the company of Aphrodite.

A common mythical explanation of the feeling of Sehnsucht is offered by Plato in his dialogue Symposium though the speech of Aristophanes, who presents a comic and unusual myth about spherical two-headed men. The myth was invented by Plato himself, but likely utilized mythical motifs which predate his work. Aristophanes, the famous comic playwright, gives a speech about Eros. According to the myth, humans originally had spherical bodies as well as four hands and feet and two heads. In their great arrogance, they tried to storm the sky and dwell amongst the gods. For this, Zeus punished them by cutting each of them in half, cleaving them into people with two arms, two legs, and just a single head. These halves are the people of today. However, these divinely divided humans suffer from their incompleteness; each one is looking for the lost other half from which they were split. The longing for the former wholeness is expressed erotic desire, which aims at union back into a two headed, four armed, and four legged state. The state of longing for the completeness of one's lost half, caused by the primordial division of the human beings by Zeus, can be characterized as Sehnsucht.

== In psychology ==
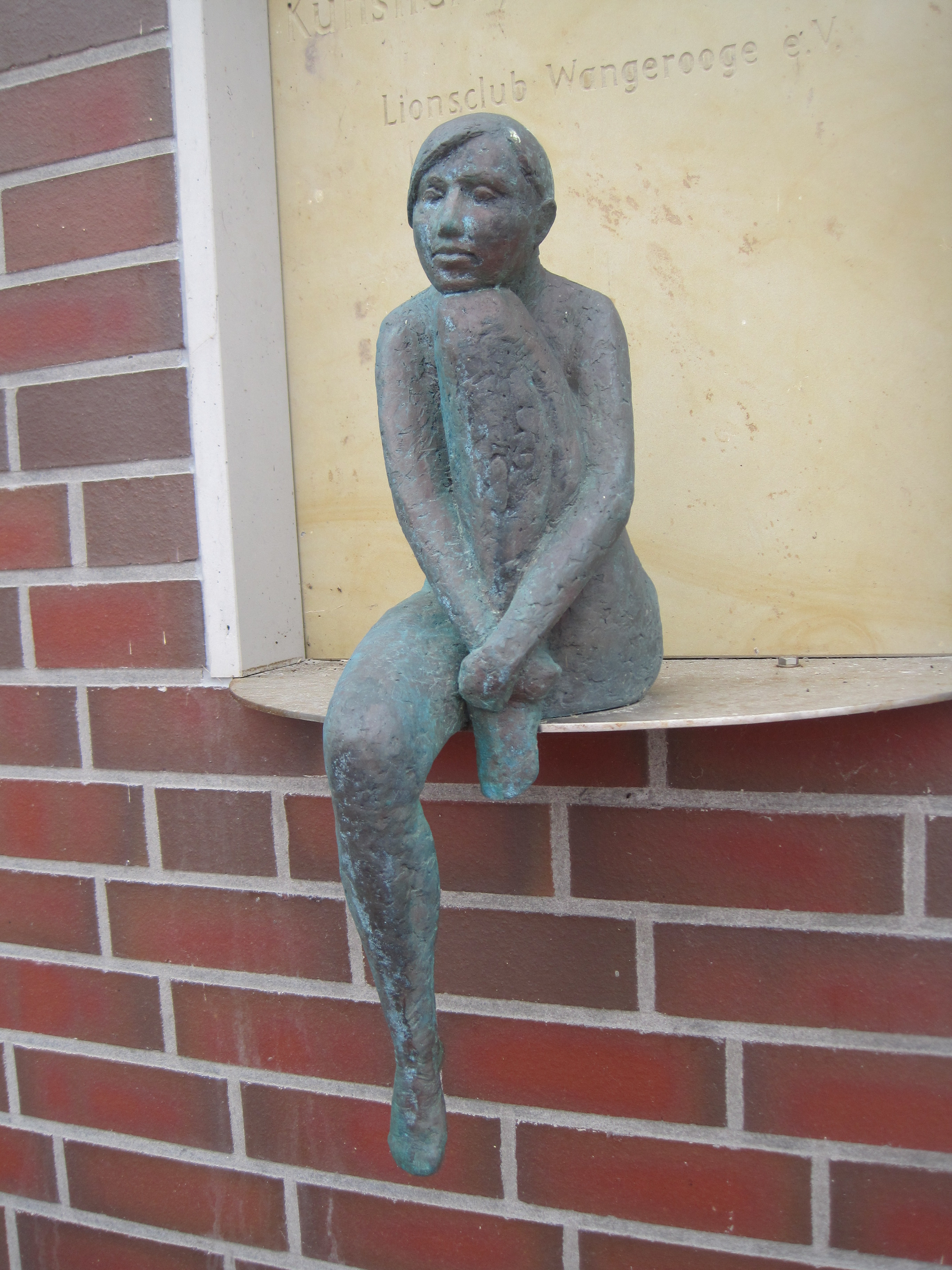
Sehnsucht, sculpture by Susanne Kraißer

Psychologists have worked to capture the essence of Sehnsucht by identifying its six core characteristics:

1. utopian conceptions of ideal development;
2. sense of incompleteness and imperfection of life;
3. conjoint time focus on the past, present, and future;
4. ambivalent (bittersweet) emotions;
5. reflection and evaluation of one's life; and
6. symbolic richness.

In a cross-cultural study conducted to determine whether the German concept of Sehnsucht could be generalized to the United States, four samples of American and German participants “rated their 2 most important life longings and completed measures of subjective well-being and health.” German and American participants did not differ in their ability to identify life longings or the intensity of their Sehnsucht. However, German participants associated it more with unattainable, utopian states while Americans reported the concept as not as important to everyday life.

Some researchers posit that Sehnsucht has a developmental function that involves life management. By imagining overarching and possibly unachievable goals, individuals may be able to create direction in their life by developing more tangible goals, or “stepping stones” that will aid them on their path toward their ideal self. "[Sehnsucht has] important developmental functions, including giving directionality for life planning and helping to cope with loss and important, yet unattainable wishes by pursuing them in one's imagination." It can also operate as a self-regulatory mechanism.

However, in a study that attempted to discover whether Sehnsucht played an active role in one's ability to influence their own development, psychologists asked 81 participants to report “their most important personal goals and life longings, and [evaluate] these with respect to their cognitive, emotional, and action-related characteristics.” Results showed that goals were perceived as more closely linked to everyday actions, and as such more controllable. Sehnsucht, on the other hand, was reported as more related to the past and future, and therefore more emotionally and developmentally ambiguous.

Also, in a study conducted in 2009, 168 middle-aged childless women were asked to rate their wish for children according to intensity and attainability. If the women rated their wish as intense and long-standing, their wish was considered a life-longing. If they rated their wish as intense and attainable, it was simply a goal. “The pursuit of the wish for children as a life longing was positively related to well-being only when participants had high control over the experience of this life longing and when other self-regulation strategies (goal adjustment) failed.”

== In popular culture ==
"Sehnsucht" is a poem by Friedrich Schiller that inspired composers like Franz Schubert and Siegfried Wagner. Goethe's "Nur wer die Sehnsucht kennt" was set to music by multiple composers, including Ludwig van Beethoven.

Longing, specifically longing for some unknown joy, is a central idea in many of the books by C. S. Lewis, such as his autobiography Surprised by Joy (1955).

Richard Strauss composed a setting of Detlev von Liliencron's poem "Sehnsucht" in 1896 (Opus 32, number 2).

Sehnsucht appears in the title of two songs by Einstürzende Neubauten, Sehnsucht (1981), from Kollaps, and Sehnsucht - Zitternd (1985), from Halber Mensch.

Sehnsucht (1997) is the title of the second album, and title track of that album, by the German metal band Rammstein.

Sehnsucht (2005) is the title of a piano composition by Jack Gibbons, featured on his album Fantaisie.

Sehnsucht (2009) is the title of an album by the German gothic metal band Lacrimosa.

In 2011, the film director Badran Roy Badran treated the concept of Sehnsucht in his feature film A Play Entitled Sehnsucht.

== See also ==
- Dukkha
- Ephemerality
- Frustration
- Hiraeth
- Mono no aware
- Peak experience
- Romanticism
- Saudade
- Tortured artist
- Wabi-sabi
- Weltschmerz
