= Candyass =

Studio album by Orgy
- Released: August 18, 1998
- Studios: Donner Pass Cabin, Truckee, California; N.R.G. Studios, North Hollywood, California; Josh's Garage, Hollywood, California; Westlake Audio, West Hollywood, California
- Genres: Electronic rock; industrial rock; nu metal
- Length: 48:10
- Labels: Warner Bros.; Reprise; Elementree
- Producers: Josh Abraham; Orgy

Orgy chronology
| Candyass (1998) | Vapor Transmission (2000) |

Singles from Candyass
- 1. "Stitches" Released: April 30, 1998; 2. "Blue Monday" Released: December 14, 1998

Candyass is the debut studio album by American rock band Orgy, released on August 18, 1998 by Warner Bros, Reprise and Elementree.

== Production ==
The album was named after a drag queen the band had met with Alexis Arquette. The album makes heavy use of the Korg Triton.

== Reception ==
Professional ratings
Review scores
| Source | Rating |
|---|---|
| AllMusic | 3/5 stars |
| Robert Christgau | (dud) |
| Pitchfork | 5.9/10 |

Candyass is the most successful Orgy album, and peaked at No. 32 on the US Billboard 200. Many critics attribute the success of the album to its second single, "Blue Monday", a cover of New Order's song of the same name. The lead single, "Stitches", was also successful on rock and alternative charts. The album was certified Platinum by the RIAA on July 22, 1999, and certified Gold by Music Canada.

The Baltimore Sun wrote: "Whether through the ominous crunch of 'Social Enemies' or the frenzied thrum of 'Fiend', Orgy knows how to use its artfully distorted sound to stunning effect, evoking a world of anomie and unease with each verse and chorus."

In 2021, the staff of Revolver included the album in their list of the "20 Essential Nu-Metal Albums".

== Track listing ==
All tracks are written by Orgy (Jay Gordon, Amir Derakh, Bobby Hewitt, and Ryan Shuck), except where noted.

| No. | Title | Writer(s) | Length |
|---|---|---|---|
| 1. | "Social Enemies" | Orgy, Josh Abraham, Troy Van Leeuwen | 4:04 |
| 2. | "Stitches" | | 3:19 |
| 3. | "Dissention" | Orgy, Paige Haley | 3:31 |
| 4. | "Platinum" | | 3:43 |
| 5. | "Fetisha" | | 4:02 |
| 6. | "Fiend" | | 4:29 |
| 7. | "Blue Monday" (New Order cover) | Bernard Sumner, Gillian Gilbert, Peter Hook, Stephen Morris | 4:28 |
| 8. | "Gender" | | 4:28 |
| 9. | "All the Same" | Orgy, Haley | 4:06 |
| 10. | "Pantomime" | Orgy, Haley | 4:29 |
| 11. | "Revival" | Orgy, Jonathan Davis | 4:11 |
| 12. | "Dizzy" | | 3:21 |
| Total length: | | | 48:10 |

== Personnel ==
Orgy

- Jay Gordon – vocals, programming, additional synthesizers
- Amir Derakh – lead guitar, additional engineering
- Ryan Shuck – rhythm guitar
- Paige Haley – bass
- Bobby Hewitt – drums

Additional

- Chad Fridirici – engineering, mixing on "Gender", pro-tool editing
- Josh Abraham – production, additional engineering, programming, additional synthesizers
- Dave Ogilvie – mixing
- David Kahne – mixing on "Stiches", "Fetisha"
- Jay Baumgardner – mixing on "Pantomime"
- Tom Baker – mastering
- Brian Virtue – assistant engineer
- Cope Till – assistant engineer
- Doug Trantow – assistant engineer
- Anthony Valcic – programming
- Jonathan Davis – additional vocals on "Revival"
- Elijah Blue Allman – additional vocals on "Revival", additional synthesizers
- Troy Van Leeuwen – additional guitars on "Social Enemies" and "Dissention"
- Steve Gerdes – art direction, design
- Joseph Cultice – photography

== Charts ==
=== Weekly charts ===
| Chart (1998–99) | Peak position |
|---|---|
| US Billboard 200 | 32 |
| US Heatseekers Albums (Billboard) | 1 |

=== Year-end charts ===
| Chart (1999) | Position |
|---|---|
| US Billboard 200 | 97 |

== Certifications ==
| Region | Certification | Certified units/sales |
|---|---|---|
| Canada (Music Canada) | Gold | 50,000^{^} |
| United States (RIAA) | Platinum | 1,000,000^{^} |
^{^} Shipments figures based on certification alone.
