= Industrial rock =

Music genre

- Stylistic origins: Industrial; rock; post-punk; experimental rock; post-industrial; noise rock; post-hardcore; noise
- Cultural origins: Late 1970s to early 1980s; United States, United Kingdom, Germany

Fusion genres
- Industrial metal

Regional scenes
- Germany

Other topics
- Industrial dance; synth-punk; EBM; electro-industrial; gothic rock; industrial techno; industrial hip-hop

Industrial rock is a fusion genre that fuses industrial music and rock music. Originally emerging in the late 1970s to early 1980s pioneered by artists such as American bands Chrome, Swans and Big Black, England's Killing Joke, and Canadian outfit Skinny Puppy, the movement was further proliferated in the late 1980s by Wax Trax! Records in the US city of Chicago, with artists such as Front 242, Front Line Assembly, KMFDM, and Sister Machine Gun.

Subsequently, the movement would lead to the emergence of genre fusions and subgenres electro-industrial, industrial metal, martial industrial, industrial hip-hop, industrial dance and industrial techno. By the 1990s, broader industrial music genres were made accessible to mainstream audiences through the popularity of acts such as Nine Inch Nails, Ministry, Rammstein and Marilyn Manson, all of whom released platinum-selling records.

== Characteristics ==
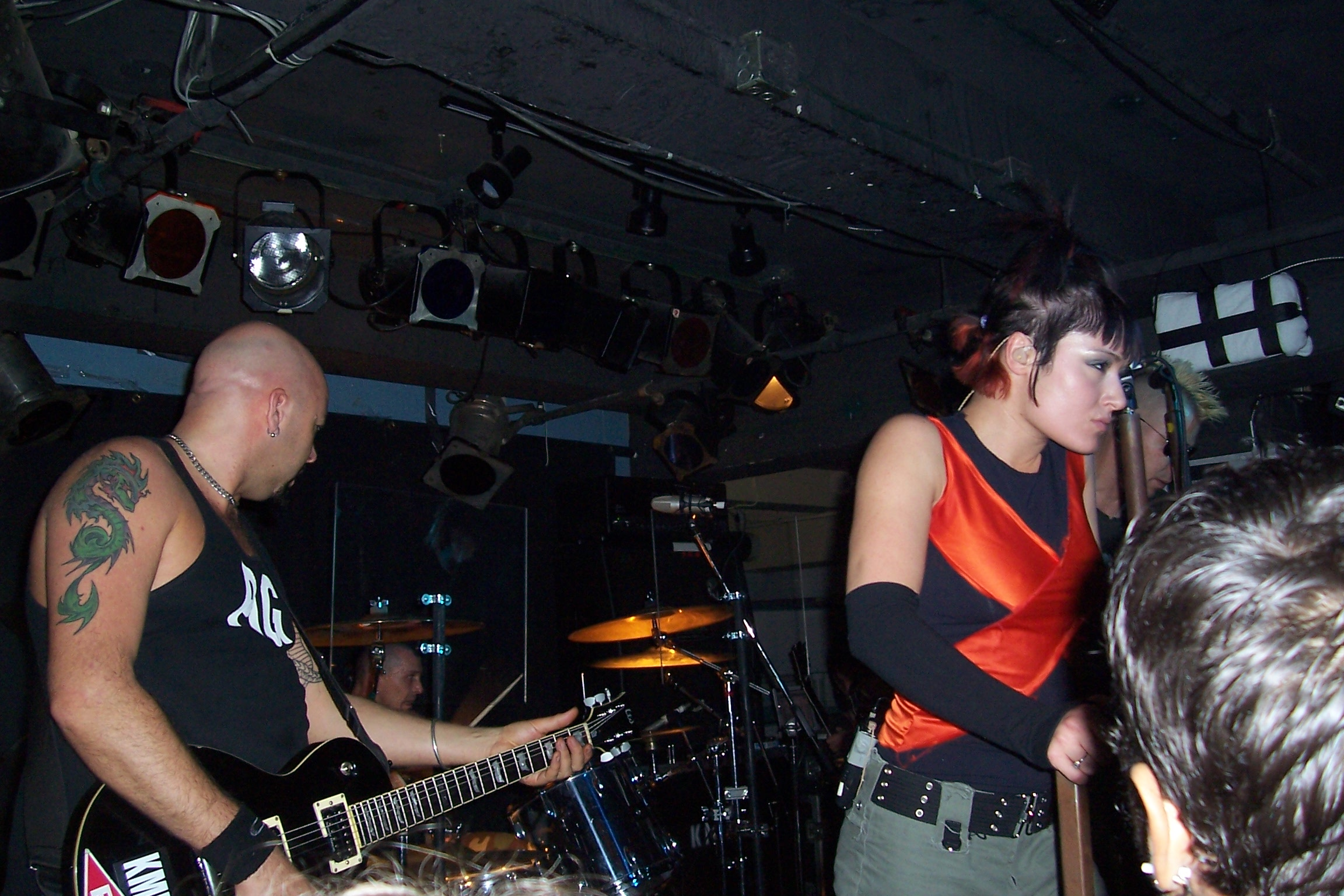
Industrial rock band KMFDM

Industrial rock is defined by the merging of rock music with influences lifted from industrial music, electronic, and avant-garde music. Industrial rock bands are characterized by harsh, abrasive sounds, blending distorted, aggressive guitar riffs with electronic textures and experimental production techniques. Exemplified by artists who signed to industrial focused independent record label Wax Trax! Records, while some industrial rock artists later overlapped with industrial metal.

== History ==
=== Forerunners ===
Cromagnon's 1969 record Orgasm has been credited with foreshadowing the industrial rock sound, with AllMusic describing it as sounding "like it could be a Ministry [...] recording from 1989". Pitchfork labelled the opening track "Caledonia" as a "pre-industrial stomp".

During the 1970s, industrial music emerged through the early works of Throbbing Gristle, Cabaret Voltaire, NON, SPK and Z'EV. Alongside, New York City band Suicide, formed in 1970, by Alan Vega and Martin Rev, whose 1977 debut album has been credited with providing "the blueprints for [...] industrial rock". Furthermore, Iggy Pop who released his debut solo album The Idiot, produced by David Bowie, in 1977, was later retroactively recognized as a forerunner to industrial rock, particularly on the closing track, "Mass Production', which contains numerous "proto-industrial noises" created using tape loops, which Hugo Wilcken described as "early industrial electronica." It later influenced the work of Trent Reznor of Nine Inch Nails. Other influences on industrial rock include Einstürzende Neubauten, Alien Sex Fiend, and Come.

=== 1970s–1980s: Origins ===
By the late 1970s, post-punk bands began incorporating elements of industrial music into rock music. Music critics retroactively credit the San Francisco band Chrome with sparking the "beginning of industrial rock." Killing Joke described by music journalist Simon Reynolds as "a post-punk version of heavy metal" emerged as an influential band in the development of industrial rock music, their album Night Time (1985) saw mainstream success and influenced Trent Reznor of Nine Inch Nails. Subsequently, New York City band Swans emerged and drew influence from the local no wave scene, most notably Glenn Branca's Theoretical Girls "You Got Me", as well as punk rock, noise music (particularly Whitehouse) and the original industrial groups. Chris Connelly said the musical project Foetus was "the instigator when it comes to the marriage of machinery to hardcore punk."

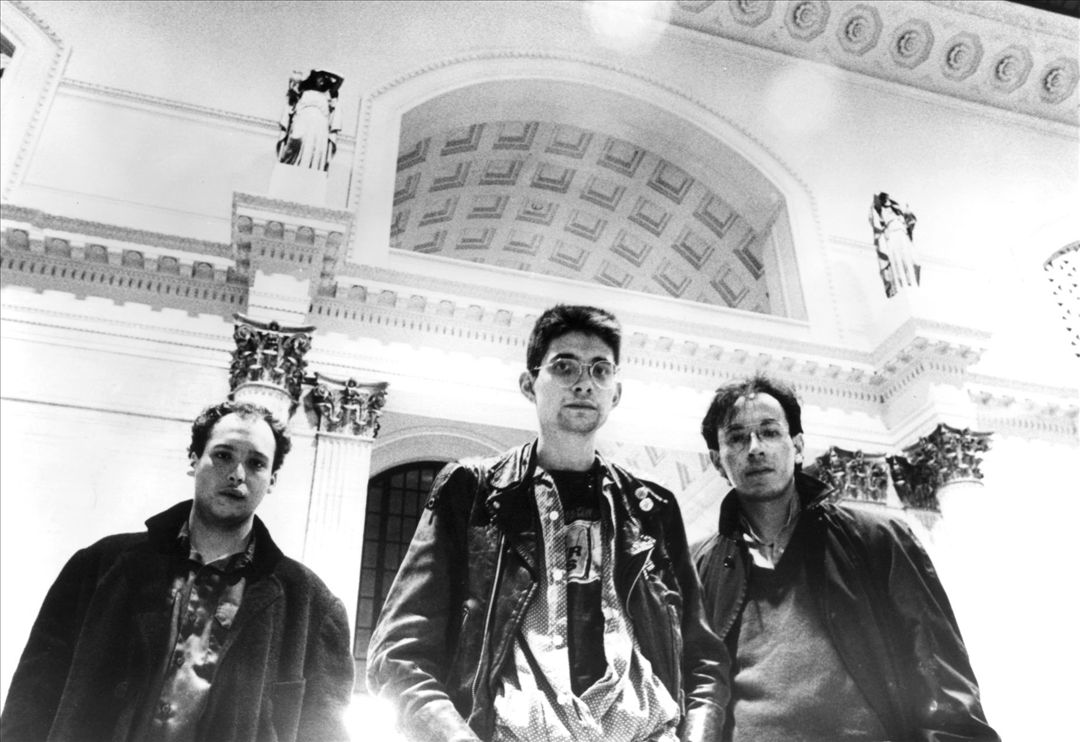
Big Black at Chicago's Union Station in 1986; left to right: Riley, Albini, and Durango

During the early 1980s, Steve Albini's band Big Black blended post-hardcore and noise rock with industrial music. The Swiss trio The Young Gods, who deliberately eschewed electric guitars in favor of a sampler, also took inspiration from both hardcore and industrial. In 1986, Canadian band Skinny Puppy released the album Mind: The Perpetual Intercourse, with its lead single, "Dig It", seeing frequent airplay on MTV. The song was a major influence on Nine Inch Nails founder Trent Reznor, who used it as inspiration when writing his first song, "Down in It".

By the late 1980s, Chicago's Wax Trax! Records became a central hub for the genre, further popularizing it across the United States. The label was started by Jim Nash and Dannie Flesher. The label went on to distribute some of the most prominent names in industrial throughout the late 1980s and 1990s – Front 242, Front Line Assembly, KMFDM, and Sister Machine Gun. In 1988, Ministry, released their album The Land of Rape and Honey, which drew from hardcore punk and thrash metal, while retaining electronic elements and samples. Ministry frontman Al Jourgensen was also involved in multiple industrial rock side projects that were signed to Wax Trax!, including Revolting Cocks, 1000 Homo DJs and Pailhead. Drawing heavy influences from New York's no wave scene, Cop Shoot Cop replaced lead guitars with bass.

=== Mainstream popularity (1990s) ===
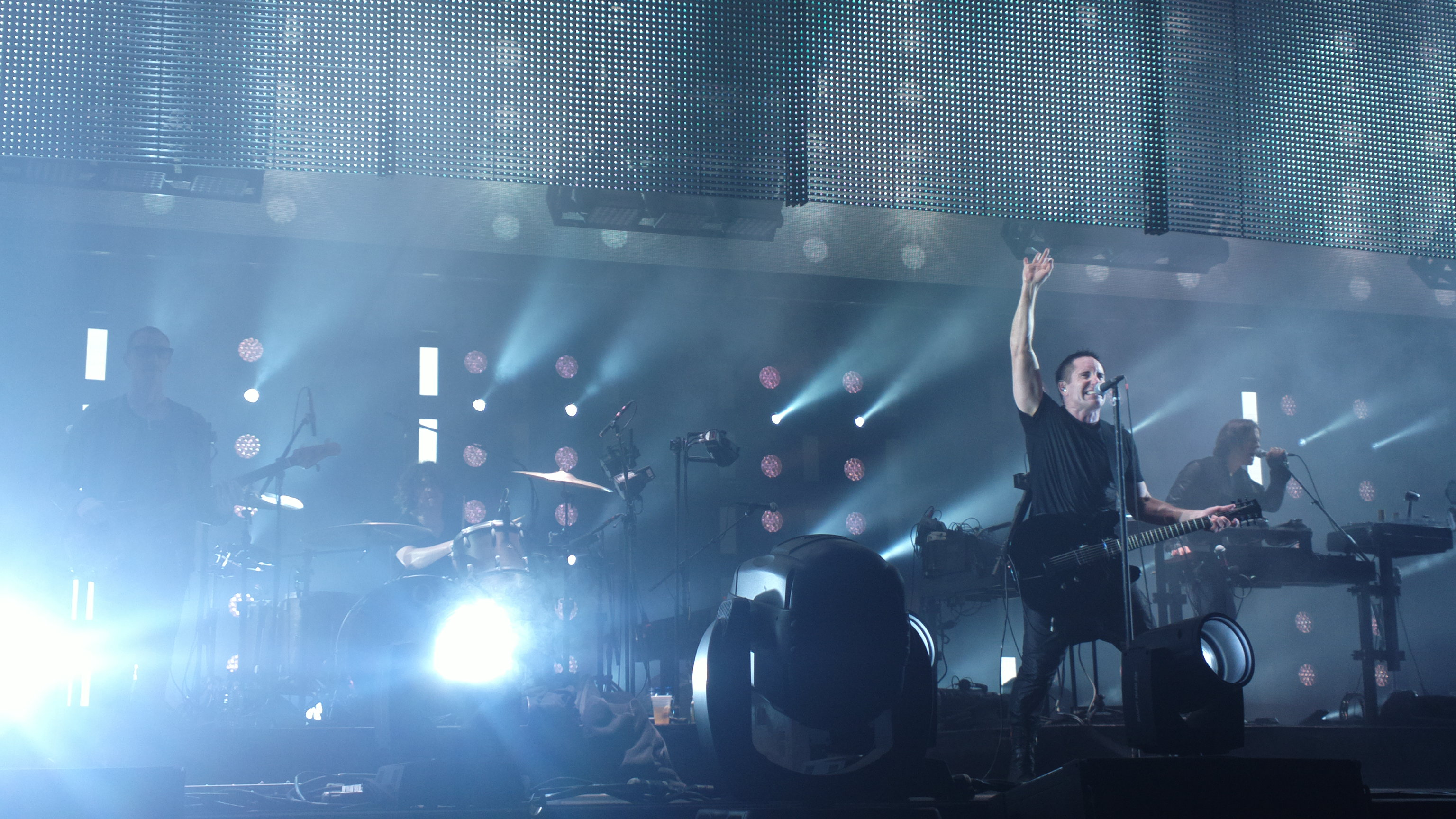
Industrial rock band Nine Inch Nails

In the 1990s, industrial rock broke into the mainstream with artists and bands such as Nine Inch Nails, Orgy, Rob Zombie, White Zombie, and Marilyn Manson. In December 1992, Nine Inch Nails' EP Broken was certified platinum by the Recording Industry Association of America (RIAA). Nine Inch Nails gained further popularity with the release of their 1994 album The Downward Spiral, which was certified 4× platinum by the RIAA in 1998. The band's 1999 album The Fragile was certified 2× platinum in January 2000. With the success of Nine Inch Nails, the band's debut album Pretty Hate Machine was certified 3× platinum by the RIAA. In the 1990s, four Nine Inch Nails songs went on the Billboard Hot 100. Several industrial rock and industrial metal artists such as KMFDM, Fear Factory, Gravity Kills and Sister Machine Gun appeared on the 1995 Mortal Kombat: Original Motion Picture Soundtrack, which was certified platinum by the RIAA in January 1996.

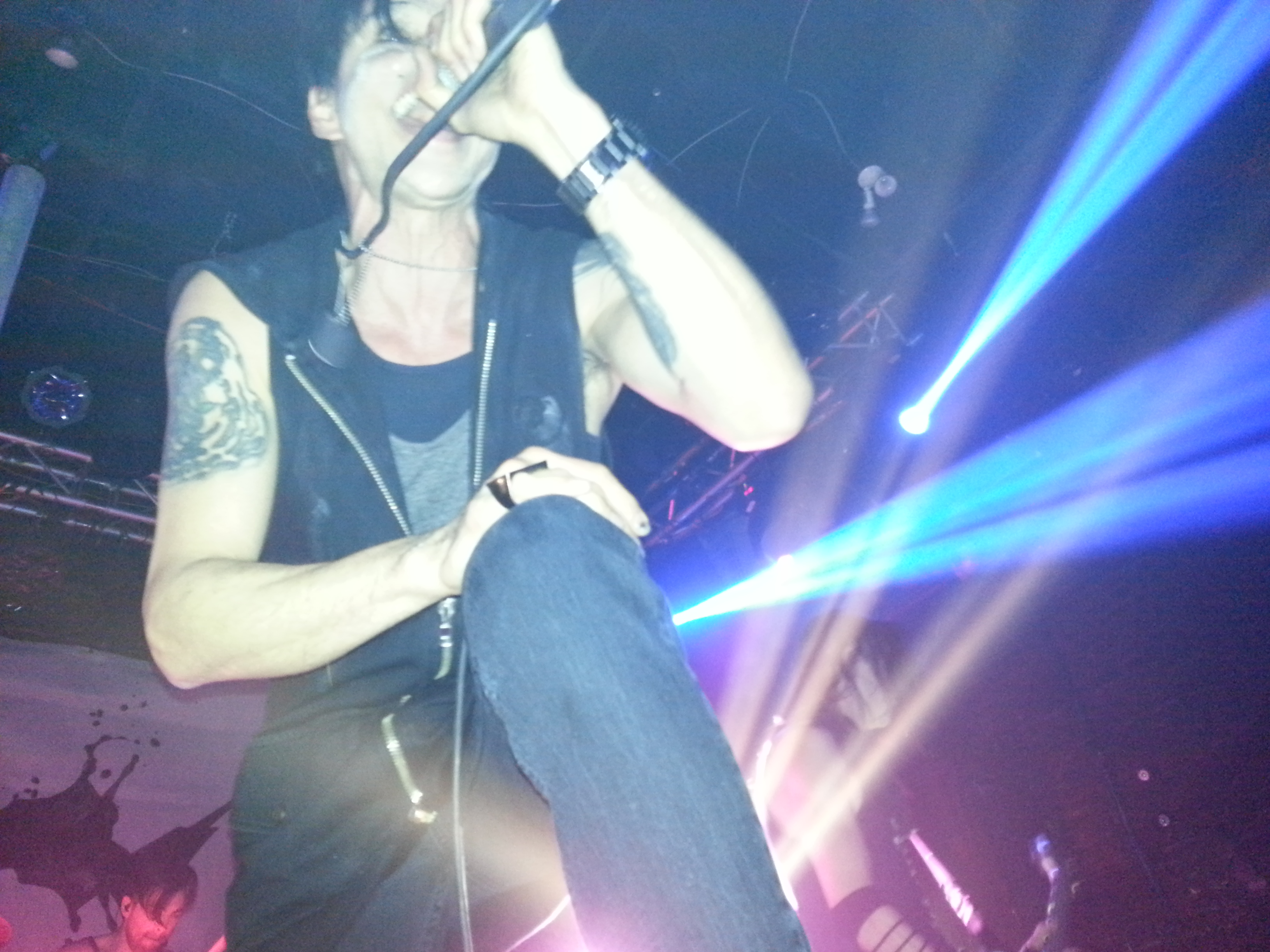
Industrial rock band Orgy performing in 2015

Marilyn Manson released their album Antichrist Superstar in 1996, which was certified platinum by the RIAA two months after its release date. In the United States, Antichrist Superstar sold at least 1,900,000 units. Marilyn Manson's EP Smells Like Children was certified platinum in May 1998. The band's third album Mechanical Animals went to number 1, dethroning Lauryn Hill's solo debut The Miseducation of Lauryn Hill and selling 223,000 copies in its first week in stores. It was certified platinum by the RIAA in February 1999 and sold at least 1,409,000 copies in the United States. Orgy also experienced mainstream success during the 1990s. The band's 1998 album Candyass was certified platinum by the RIAA in July 1999. Orgy's cover of New Order's song "Blue Monday" went to number 56 on the Billboard Hot 100 and number 2 on the Dance Club Songs chart. White Zombie experimented with industrial metal on its 1995 album Astro-Creep: 2000, which was certified 2× platinum by the RIAA in March 1996. White Zombie's vocalist Rob Zombie began creating pure industrial metal albums in his solo career. Rob Zombie's 1998 solo debut studio album Hellbilly Deluxe was certified 3× platinum by the RIAA less than two years after its release date. In November 1999, Powerman 5000's album Tonight the Stars Revolt! was certified platinum by the RIAA. The album sold at least 1,316,172 units in the United States. A large Industrial metal scene also emerged in Europe in the 20th century. The Industrial Metal band that manages to appeal to the largest audiences worldwide is Rammstein. Other names have also proven successful in the European scene, including Pain, Deathstars, Dagoba, Eisbrecher, Gothminister and Godflesh.

== Labels ==
- Wax Trax! Records
- Nothing Records

== See also ==
- Industrial rock musical groups
- Industrial rock sales and awards
- List of industrial music bands
