= Julien-K discography =

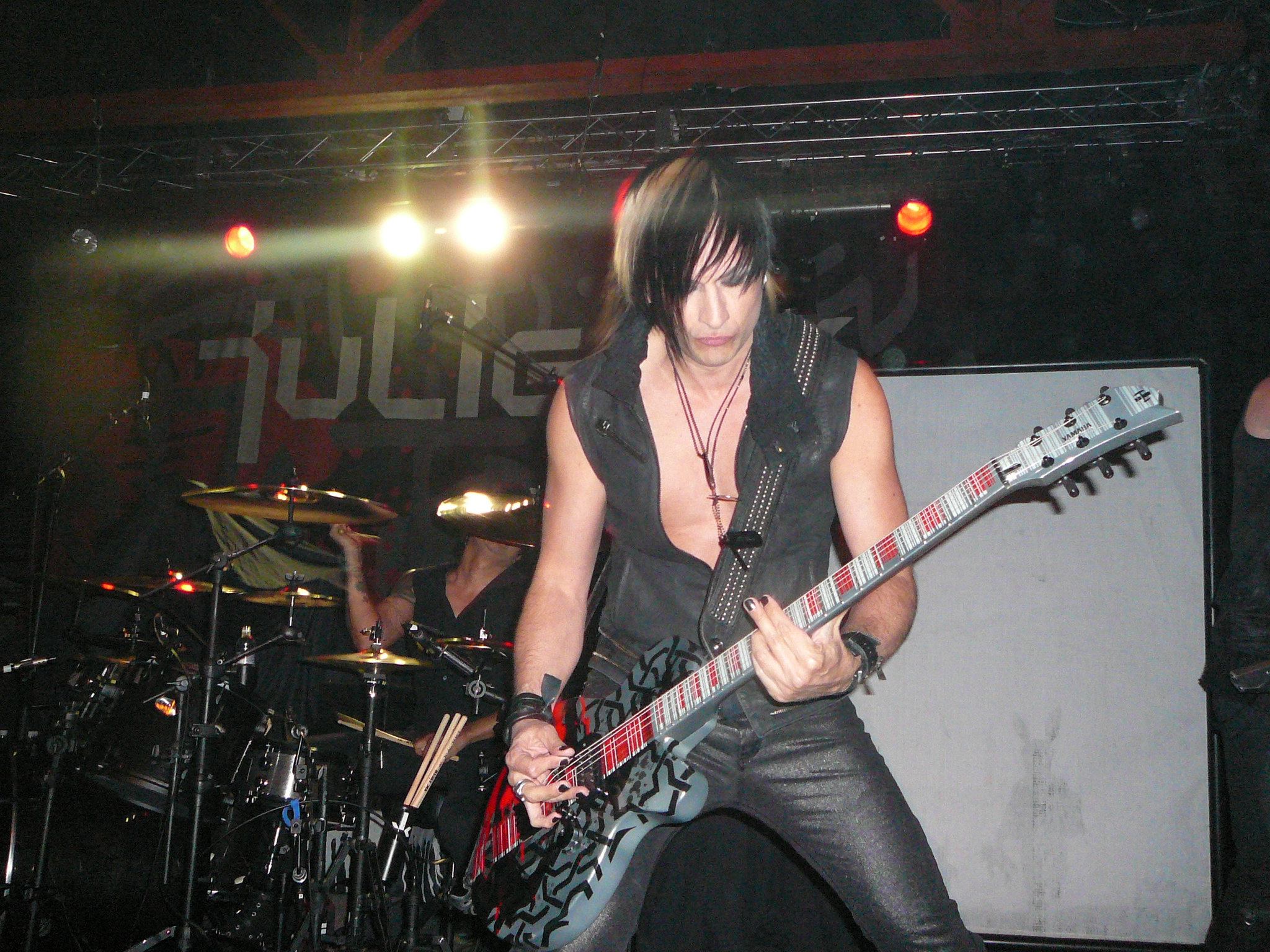
- Julien-K performing live on-stage in 2008
- Studio albums: 5
- Extended plays: 5
- Soundtrack albums: 5
- Compilation albums: 1
- Singles: 10
- Video albums: 1
- Music videos: 5
- Remix albums: 2

The discography for electronic rock music group Julien-K.

== Albums ==
=== Studio albums ===
Title	Album details	Peak chart positions	
Title	Album details	US Dance	US Heat
Death to Analog	Released: March 10, 2009 (US) March 5, 2010 (Europe); Label: Metropolis Records	10	37
We're Here with You	Released: January 23, 2012; Label: Tiefdruck-Musik	—	—
California Noir: Chapter One - Analog Beaches & Digital Cities	Released: March 31, 2015; Label: Julien-K Inc.	—	—
California Noir: Chapter Two - Nightlife in Neon	Released: August 9, 2016; Label: Julien-K Inc.	—	—
Harmonic Disruptor	Released April 17, 2020; Julien-K Inc.	—	—

=== Remix albums ===
Title	Album details
Death to Digital	Released: March 10, 2009 (worldwide); Label: Julien-K Inc.
Death to Digital X	Released: April 27, 2010 (worldwide/digital); Label: Tiefdruck-Musik/Level 7

=== Extended plays ===
EP details	Track listing
Kick the Bass Promo EP: Released: 2008; Length: 30:50; Label: self-released	1. "Kick the Bass"; 2. "Technical Difficulties"; 3. "Maestro"; 4. "Kick the Bass" (Virgin Tears & Fu - Kick the Freebase Remix); 5. "Technical Difficulties" (iPunk Remix); 6. "Maestro" (Brandon Belsky Remix)
Death to Digital X - Instrumental EP: Released: 2010; Length: Label: Tiefdruck-Musik	1. "Technical Difficulties" (Photek Remix) - Instrumental; 2. "Disease" (Franz & Shape Remix) - Instrumental; 3. "Technical Difficulties" (iPunk Remix) - Instrumental; 4. "Dreamland" (Dave the Hustler - In Hustlers Dreams Remix) - Instrumental; 5. "Systeme De Sexe" (iPunk Remix) - Instrumental; 6. "Technical Difficulties" (Bryan Black Remix) - Instrumental
Circuit Freq Records - Xtras V.1: Released: September 2, 2010; Length: Label: Tiefdruck-Musik	1. "Futura" (Xtended Dub Mix); 2. "Kick the Bass" (La Dolce Vita remix)
Casa Del Tigor Sessions: Released: February 22, 2011; Length: 23:27; Label: Tiefdruck-Musik	1. "Whore"; 2. "CCTV"; 3. "Make It Sting"; 4. "Just How Far"; 5. "Flashback"
We're Here with You Remix EP: Released: March 13, 2011; Length: 37:09; Label: Circuit Freq Records	1. "Flashpoint Riot (Neon Stereo Remix)"; 2. "Breakfast in Berlin (Sharooz Remix)"; 3. "Nights of Future Past (Vandal Remix)"; 4. "We're Here with You (Black Asteroid Remix)"; 5. "Surrounded by Cowards (Benjamin Vial Remix)"; 6. "Cruel Daze of Summer (Z-Listers Remix)"

==== Compilation albums ====
Title	Album details
Time Capsule: A Future Retrospective	Released: February 19, 2018 (Indiegogo-exclusive); Label: Julien-K Inc.

=== Singles ===
Year	Song	US Dance	Album
2008	"Look at U"	—	Death to Analog
2008	"Maestro"	—	Death to Analog
2009	"Someday Soon"	—	Death to Analog
2009	"Kick the Bass"	24	Death to Analog
2009	"Spiral"	—	Death to Analog
2010	"Dreamland"	—	Death to Analog
2012	"Breakfast in Berlin"	—	We're Here with You
2012	"Cruel Daze of Summer"	—	We're Here with You
2014	"California Noir"	—	California Noir: Analog Beaches & Digital Cities
2016	"Mannequin Eyes"	—	California Noir: Nightlife in Neon

=== Released demos ===
- "Look at U (2004 Demo)" (released on Initium Eyewear International Opticult compilation CD in 2004)
- "Kick the Bass (2005 Demo)" (released as a pre-order bonus MP3 for Death to Analog from Metropolis Records)
- "Everyone Knows (Demo)" (announced as exclusive free download release for members of the official Julien-K street team, Systeme De Street)

=== Other songs ===
- "Fail with Grace" (Sam Vandal featuring Ryan Shuck)
- "Superdiscount (Jagz Kooner Remix)" (Virgin Tears vs. Julien-K)
- "Crash" (Grey Saints vs. Julien-K)

=== Street Team exclusives ===
- "Kick the Bass" (Virgin Tears & Fu Kick the Freebase Remix)
- "Systeme de Sexe" (Live in Moline, Illinois) DVD

=== Other remixes ===
- "Flashback" (iPunk Remix) - free download
- "Killing Fields" (Brandon Belsky Remix) - free download
- "Someday Soon" (Motor Remix V1) - free download

=== Remixes for others ===
- "Flashback" by Motor (Julien-K Acid Test Remix) - iTunes bonus track on Motor's Unhuman album
- "Sleep When I'm Dead" by The Cure (Gerard Way & Julien-K Remix) – Released on Hypnagogic States EP
- "Neighborhood" by (Dirty Heads vs. Julien-K)- Clip on their official website
- "Strength of the World" by Avenged Sevenfold (Julien-K Remix) - Clip on their official website
- "What Do They Know?" (Mindless Self Indulgence vs. Julien-K & Chester Bennington) - Hot Topic exclusive CD, re-released via Metropolis Records
- "What Do They Know?" (Mindless Self Indulgence Vs. Julien-K & Chester Bennington - Instrumental DJ Dub) - free download from Julien-K.com

== Soundtracks ==
=== Video games ===
- Triple Threat: Sonic Heroes Vocal Trax – "This Machine"
- Lost and Found: Shadow the Hedgehog Vocal Trax – "Waking Up"
- Transformers: Revenge of the Fallen (Complete video game score)
- True Colors: The Best of Sonic the Hedgehog Part 2 – "Waking Up" and "This Machine"

=== Film ===
- Underworld: Evolution – "Morning After" (Chester Bennington ft. Julien-K)
- Transformers – "Technical Difficulties"
- Matt's Chance (Complete original motion picture soundtrack)

== Video albums ==
Year	Title
2007	Systeme de Sexe (Live in Moline, Illinois) (Bobby Hewitt Edit) (Street Team Exclusive): Release: 2007; Label: self-released; Format: DVD

== Music videos ==
Year	Song	Director(s)	Notes
2007	"Death to Analog" (Projekt Rev) (live)	Julien-K	Live footage from 2007 Projekt Revolution tour.
2007	"Look at U" (Live)	Julien-K	Live footage from Moline, Illinois, 2007.
2007	"Systeme de Sexe" (Bobby Hewitt Edit) (live)	Bobby Hewitt	Also released on DVD exclusively for Street Team members.
2009	"Kick the Bass" (explicit version)	Ryan Rickett	Debuted via PlayBoy.com.
2009	"Kick the Bass" (censored version)	Ryan Rickett	Released with initial US Death to Analog CD pre-order.
2012	"Breakfast in Berlin"	Katya Tsyganova	
2012	"Flashpoint Riot"	Katya Tsyganova	
2012	"We're Here with You"	Vicente Cordero	
2012	"Cruel Daze of Summer"	Vicente/Fernando Cordero	
2013	"Nights of Future Past"	Katya Tsyganova	
2014	"California Noir"	Vincente/Fernando Cordero, Ryan Shuck, Amir Derakh	
2016	"Mannequin Eyes"	Amir Derakh, Ryan Shuck, Bobby Hewitt	
2021	"Lies Like Fire"	Oscar Gutierrez	The Anix Version
