= Time Capsule: A Future Retrospective =

Box set by Julien-K
- Released: February 19, 2018
- Recorded: 2003–2017
- Genre: Electronic rock; alternative rock; industrial rock; post-punk; synthrock; acoustic rock
- Label: Julien-K Inc.
- Producer: Julien-K

Julien-K chronology
California Noir - Chapter Two: Nightlife in Neon (2016)	Time Capsule: A Future Retrospective (2018)	Harmonic Disruptor (2020)

Time Capsule: A Future Retrospective is a box set by American electronic rock band Julien-K. It is a four-disc collection of previously rare or unreleased material, including b-sides, demos, rough mixes, remixes, and live recordings.

== Background ==
The 64-track four-disc set was first announced in May 2017 via Facebook. As with the band's previous two albums an Indiegogo campaign was launched in order to finance the project, and as with previous campaigns their $15,000 goal was reached within a day, ultimately finishing the campaign with $50,520.

== Track listing ==
=== Disc One: Unreleased Songs & Studio B-Sides ===
No.	Title	Length
1.	"Killer Instinct" (2005)	3:16
2.	"The Antisocialites" (2013)	3:34
3.	"Broken Pieces" (2014)	4:03
4.	"Little Damnation" (2007)	3:11
5.	"Wastelander" (2013)	4:51
6.	"Darkest Days of My Bitter Youth" (2013)	4:29
7.	"Walking With the Dead in My Arms" (2011)	5:26
8.	"The Hunting" (2011)	4:25
9.	"Wind Screams Love" (2012)	3:48
10.	"All of My Life" (2005)	3:40
11.	"Killing Fields" (2006 Death to Analog B-Side)	5:18
12.	"Dreamland" (2005 Death to Analog B-Side) (previously released as a single in Europe)	4:07
13.	"Cruel Daze of Summer" (2012) (The House of Rock Live Sessions)	6:24
14.	"Nights of Future Past" (2012) (The House of Rock Live Sessions)	5:26
15.	"We're Here With You" (2012) (The House of Rock Live Sessions)	4:58
Total length:		1:06:40

=== Disc Two: Demos ===
No.	Title	Length
1.	"Alibi" (2003 Demo)	3:50
2.	"Kick the Bass" (2004 Demo)	4:31
3.	"Someday Soon" (2004 Demo)	4:11
4.	"Everyone Knows" (2004 Demo) (previously released as an exclusive free download for members of the band's street team)	4:04
5.	"Look At U" (2004 Demo) (previously released on Initium Eyewear International Opticult compilation CD)	3:42
6.	"Maestro" (2004 Snippet)	2:03
7.	"Technical Difficulties" (2004 Demo)	4:33
8.	"Shaking" (2004 Demo)	4:15
9.	"Cowboys & Runaways" (2005 Demo)	4:00
10.	"Spiral" (2005 Demo)	4:20
11.	"Walking" (2007 "Little Damnation" Demo)	2:41
12.	"Cruel Daze of Summer" (2010 Demo w/Pre-Chorus)	7:17
13.	"Hyper Chase" (2011 "Flashpoint Riot" Demo)	5:05
14.	"California Dreams" (2013 "California Noir" Demo)	3:57
15.	"All This From the Sky" (2013 "Strange Invisible" Demo)	3:31
16.	"Rainbows" (2013 "Strange Invisible" Early Jam)	2:28
Total length:		1:04:20

=== Disc Three: Live & Acoustic ===
No.	Title	Length
1.	"Death to Analog" (Live in Casper, Wyoming) (2007)	5:29
2.	"Look At U" (Live in Casper, Wyoming) (2007)	3:53
3.	"Kick the Bass" (Live in Casper, Wyoming) (2007)	3:58
4.	"Systeme de Sexe" (Live in Casper, Wyoming) (2007)	5:33
5.	"Spiral" (Live in Casper, Wyoming) (2007)	3:57
6.	"Technical Difficulties" (Live in Casper, Wyoming) (2007)	5:27
7.	"Cruel Daze of Summer" (The Rock Shop Live Sessions) (2012)	6:25
8.	"Colorcast" (The Rock Shop Live Sessions) (2012)	4:40
9.	"Surrounded By Cowards" (The Rock Shop Live Sessions) (2012)	4:31
10.	"Palm Springs Reset" (featuring Chester Bennington) (Stars of the Season Acoustic Benefit Show) (2011)	5:13
11.	"I'll Try Not to Destroy You" (featuring Chester Bennington) (Stars of the Season Acoustic Benefit Show) (2011)	5:05
12.	"California Noir" (Gypsy Den Acoustic Show) (2015)	3:32
13.	"She's the Pretender" (Gypsy Den Acoustic Show) (2015)	3:53
14.	"Cast Into the Sea" (Gypsy Den Acoustic Show) (2015)	3:32
15.	"Strange Invisible" (Gypsy Den Acoustic Show Rehearsal) (2016)	3:22
16.	"Eviscerate" (Gypsy Den Acoustic Show Rehearsal) (2016)	4:52
17.	"Framework" (Gypsy Den Acoustic Show Rehearsal) (2016)	3:34
Total length:		1:17:19

=== Disc Four: Rough Mixes, Remixes & Live ===
No.	Title	Length
1.	"Kick the Bass" (2005 Electro Rough Mix)	4:01
2.	"Someday Soon" (2005 Rough Mix)	4:14
3.	"Technical Difficulties" (2005 Rough Mix)	4:38
4.	"Dreamland" (2005 Rough Mix)	4:02
5.	"Maestro" (2005 Rough Mix)	3:29
6.	"Stranded" (2005 Rough Mix)	4:05
7.	"Cruel Daze of Summer" (2012 Rough Mix)	6:24
8.	"California Noir" (2017 Zeskullz VIP Remix)	4:12
9.	"Killing Fields" (2009 Brandon Belsky Remix) (previously released as a free download)	6:33
10.	"Dreamland" (2010 Gorstein Remix) (previously released on Dreamland single)	3:48
11.	"Kick the Bass" (2014 Razorwerk Remix)	5:02
12.	"Maestro" (2007 Brandon Belsky Remix) (previously released on Death to Digital X)	7:00
13.	"Someday Soon" (2011 Live Remix Version) (previously released on SDS Sessions V.1)	3:14
14.	"Maestro" (2011 Live Remix Version) (previously released on SDS Sessions V.1)	5:10
15.	"Fail With Grace" (2011 JK Live Version) (previously released on SDS Sessions V.1)	5:29
16.	"Dregs of the World" (2011 JK Live Version) (previously released on SDS Sessions V.1)	4:52
Total length:		1:16:04

Transformers: Revenge of the Fallen Score (2009) – Indiegogo backers exclusive bonus disc
No.	Title	Length
1.	"Mx_Mil_Escort_A_Intro"	0:30
2.	"Mx_Mil_Escort_A_P1"	1:22
3.	"Mx_Mil_Escort_A_Outro1"	0:14
4.	"Mx_Mil_Escort_A_P2"	1:22
5.	"Mx_Mil_Escort_A_Outro2"	0:16
6.	"Mx_Mil_Escort_A_P3"	1:22
7.	"Mx_Mil_Escort_A_Outro3"	0:15
8.	"Mx_Mil_Escort_A_Outro_Lose"	0:14
9.	"Mx_Mil_Escort_A_Outro_Medium"	0:15
10.	"Mx_Mil_Escort_A_Win"	0:18
11.	"Mx_Decepticon_Theme"	3:18
12.	"Mx_Kidnap_D_P1"	1:36
13.	"Mx_Destroy_D"	3:03
14.	"Mx_Escort2_A_Ambient_Loop"	1:28
15.	"Death to Analog" (Revenge of the Fallen Instrumental Edit #1)	1:24
16.	"Death to Analog" (Revenge of the Fallen Instrumental Edit #2)	1:34
17.	"Maestro" (Brandon Belsky Instrumental Remix)	7:02
18.	"Technical Difficulties" (Photek Instrumental Remix)	6:34
Total length:		32:01

== Personnel ==
Julien-K

- Ryan Shuck – vocals, guitar
- Amir Derakh – guitar, bass guitar, synthesizer, G-Synth, programming
- Anthony 'Fu' Valcic – programming, synthesizer, bass guitar

Additional musicians

- James Kinney - organ on track 1 (disc one); programming, synthesizer on tracks 1, 8 (disc one), track 6 (disc four); keys on track 6 (disc four)
- Brandon Belsky - programming, bass on track 4 (disc one), track 11 (disc two); keys, backing vocals on tracks 1–6 (disc three)
- Eric Stoffel - programming, synthesizer on track 9 (disc one), tracks 14–16 (disc two), tracks 15–17 (disc three)
- Eli James - drums on tracks 13–15 (disc one), tracks 7–9 (disc three)
- Brian Spangenburg - fretless bass on track 1 (disc two)
- Jamey Koch - EFX guitar on track 10 (disc two)
- The Z-Listers - programming, synthesizer on track 12 (disc two), track 7 (disc four)
- Guy Hatfield - synthesizer on track 13 (disc two)
- Elias Rodriguez - drums on tracks 1–6 (disc three), tracks 13–16 (disc four); percussion on tracks 12–14 (disc three)
- Chester Bennington - additional vocals on tracks 10–11 (disc three)
- Amber Snead - additional vocals on tracks 12–17 (disc three)
- Maestro Rhythm King - beatbox on tracks 12–14 (disc three)
- Ricardo 'Ricky' Restrepo - v-drums on tracks 15–17 (disc three)
