= California Noir: Analog Beaches & Digital Cities =

California Noir - Chapter One: Analog Beaches & Digital Cities

Studio album by Julien-K
- Released: March 27, 2015
- Recorded: 2015
- Genre: Electronic rock; alternative rock; industrial rock; post-punk
- Label: Julien-K Inc.
- Producer: Julien-K

Julien-K chronology
We're Here with You (2012)	California Noir - Chapter One: Analog Beaches & Digital Cities (2015)	California Noir - Chapter Two: Nightlife in Neon (2016)

Singles from California Noir - Chapter One: Analog Beaches & Digital Cities
- 1. "California Noir" Released: July 8, 2014

California Noir - Chapter One: Analog Beaches & Digital Cities is the third studio album by American electronic rock band Julien-K. It is the first album without former drummer Elias Andra. During the recording process he was replaced by Eli James who he also replaced in Dead By Sunrise, the alternative rock side project of Linkin Park frontman Chester Bennington. Furthermore, this album is the first chapter of the concept album California Noir. The second chapter, Nightlife in Neon, was released on August 5, 2016.

== Background ==
The album was first announced in January 2015 via Facebook. This announcement came along with an Indiegogo campaign in order to finance the album. It started on January 26, 2015, and aimed for a goal of $10,000; however, when the campaign ended 30 days later more than $28,000 had been collected. The initial goal of $10,000 was reached within 10 hours.

== Track listing ==
No.	Title	Length
1.	"Analog Beaches & Digital Cities"	2:03
2.	"Strange Invisible"	3:22
3.	"Photo Voltaire"	3:59
4.	"California Noir"	3:51
5.	"Black Market Machines"	4:13
6.	"Deep Beat Overground"	3:49
7.	"Cast Into the Sea"	3:29
8.	"She's the Pretender"	3:57
9.	"No You Can't"	2:57
10.	"Eviscerate"	4:57

== Personnel ==
Julien-K

- Ryan Shuck – lead vocals, rhythm guitar
- Amir Derakh – lead guitar, bass guitar, synthesizer, percussion
- Anthony 'Fu' Valcic – programming, samples, bass guitar

Additional musicians

- Eric Stoffel – programming, synthesizer on tracks 2, 4
- Craig 'Craigypants' Williams – programming, synthesizer on track 8
- Caitlyn Youngblood – background vocals on track 2
- Len Hotrum – background vocals on track 7
- Amber Snead – female choir on track 10
- Eli James – drums, percussion on tracks 4, 5, 6, 7
- Frank Zummo – drums, percussion on track 4
- Ricardo Restrepo – drums, percussion on track 4
- Elias Malin – drums, percussion on track 9
