= California Noir: Nightlife in Neon =

California Noir – Chapter Two: Nightlife in Neon

Studio album by Julien-K
- Released: August 5, 2016
- Recorded: 2016
- Genre: Electronic rock; alternative rock; industrial rock; post-punk
- Length: 49:28
- Label: Julien-K Inc.
- Producer: Julien-K

Julien-K chronology
California Noir – Chapter One: Analog Beaches & Digital Cities (2015)	California Noir – Chapter Two: Nightlife in Neon (2016)	Time Capsule: A Future Retrospective (2018)

Singles from California Noir – Chapter Two: Nightlife in Neon
- 1. "Mannequin Eyes" Released: February 16, 2016

California Noir – Chapter Two: Nightlife in Neon is the fourth studio album by American electronic rock band Julien-K. It is the second chapter of the concept album California Noir. The first chapter, Analog Beaches & Digital Cities, was released in 2015.

== Background ==
The two-part concept album was first announced in January 2015 via Facebook. An Indiegogo campaign was launched to finance the album. It started on May 3, 2016, and aimed for a goal of $10,000, which it reached within two hours; when the campaign ended 30 days later more than $43,000 had been collected.

== Track listing ==
No.	Title	Length
1.	"Signals in the Void"	2:52
2.	"Spectromeda"	4:11
3.	"Dossier"	4:45
4.	"Sunset Life"	6:11
5.	"Mannequin Eyes"	3:40
6.	"Corrections"	4:42
7.	"Solar"	4:05
8.	"Institution"	4:24
9.	"Dark Cadence"	5:01
10.	"Framework"	3:20
11.	"Temple"	4:12
12.	"Nightlife in Neon"	2:05

== Personnel ==
Julien-K

- Ryan Shuck – vocals, rhythm guitar
- Amir Derakh – lead guitar, bass, synthesizers, G-synth, programming
- Anthony 'Fu' Valcic – programming, synthesizers, bass

Production

- Amir Derakh – mixing, producer
- Brandon Belsky – additional engineering
- Eric Stoffel – additional engineering
- Nathaniel Peck – additional engineering
