= Harmonic Disruptor =

Studio album by Julien-K
- Released: April 17, 2020
- Recorded: 2018–2019
- Genre: Electronic rock; industrial metal
- Length: 34:07
- Label: Julien-K Inc.
- Producer: Amir Derakh

Julien-K chronology
Time Capsule: A Future Retrospective (2018)	Harmonic Disruptor (2020)

Singles from Harmonic Disruptor
- 1. "Harmonic Disruptor" Released: January 24, 2020; 2. "Shut Down Your Soul" Released: February 28, 2020; 3. "Stronger Without You" Released: March 20, 2020

Harmonic Disruptor is the fifth studio album by American electronic rock band Julien-K, released on April 17, 2020.

== Background ==
The album was first announced in June 2018 via Facebook. Like the band's previous four releases, an Indiegogo campaign was launched in order to finance the album. It started on June 12, 2018, and aimed for a goal of $10,000; when the campaign ended on July 12 more than $47,000 had been collected.

The album's first single, "Harmonic Disruptor", was released on January 24, 2020 along with its lyric video. On February 14 a music video for "Shut Down Your Soul" was released (while the digital single was published two weeks after), while the third single "Stronger Without You" was premiered on March 20.

== Track listing ==
Harmonic Disruptor track listing
No.	Title	Writer(s)	Length
1.	"Harmonic Disruptor"	Amir Derakh; Anthony Valcic; Ryan Shuck	5:16
2.	"Cross"	Shuck; Derakh; Bidkar Grijalva; Alex Gonzales; Valcic	3:14
3.	"Stronger Without You"	Eric Stoffel; Shuck; Derakh; Valcic	4:15
4.	"Lies Like Fire"	Derakh; Shuck; Valcic; Gonzales	3:52
5.	"Shut Down Your Soul"	Derakh; Shuck; Valcic	3:16
6.	"As the Sirens Call"	Derakh; Shuck; Valcic	4:26
7.	"Burn the System"	Shuck; Derakh; Grijalva; Gonzales; Valcic	4:24
8.	"Undo Everything"	Derakh; Valcic; Shuck; Grijalva; Kevin Preston; Brett Carruthers	5:20

== Personnel ==
Julien-K

- Ryan Shuck – vocals, guitar, bass, synths
- Amir Derakh – guitar, bass, programming, synths, production, mixing, recording
- Anthony "Fu" Valcic – programming, synths, recording
- Alex Gonzales – additional vocals on "Cross" and "Burn the System", additional backing vocals on "Stronger Without You", additional drum programming on "Lies Like Fire" and "Burn the System"
- Bidi Cobra – additional programming on "Cross" and "Burn the System", additional noises on "Cross"

Additional musicians

- Mike Marsh – vinyl and digital mastering
- Eric Stoffel – initial programming, additional guitars and backing vocals on "Stronger Without You"
- Galen Wailing – additional noises on "As the Sirens Call"
- Kevin Preston – additional synths on "Undo Everything"
- Brett Carruthers – additional synths on "Undo Everything"

== See also ==
- List of 2020 albums
