= Sound bite =

Short audio clip extracted from a recording

A sound bite or soundbite is a short clip of speech or music extracted from a longer piece of audio, often used to promote or exemplify the full-length piece. In the context of journalism, a sound bite is characterized by a short phrase or sentence that captures the essence of what the speaker was trying to say, and is used to summarize information and entice the reader or viewer. The term was coined by the U.S. media in the 1970s. Since then, various politicians have increasingly employed sound bites to summarize their positions.

Due to its brevity, the sound bite often overshadows the broader context in which it was spoken, and can be misleading or inaccurate. The insertion of sound bites into news broadcasts or documentaries is open to manipulation, leading to conflict over journalistic ethics.

== History ==
In the 1960s and 1970s, pressure from advertisers on the American television industry to create entertaining news material made sound bites central to political coverage. Politicians began to use PR techniques to craft self-images and slogans that would resonate with the television-viewing audience and ensure their victory in campaigns. The term "sound bite" was coined in the late 1970s, several years before the presidency of Ronald Reagan, who was famous for short, memorable phrases like, "Mr. Gorbachev, tear down this wall!" in reference to the Berlin Wall.

During the 1988 United States presidential election, candidate Michael Dukakis highlighted the prominent role of sound bites and spin doctors in political campaigns by running a commercial that mocked contender George H. W. Bush's handlers' frustration over the gaffes of his vice presidential running-mate Dan Quayle.

== Journalism ==
In journalism, sound bites are used to summarize the position of the speaker, as well as to increase the interest of the reader or viewer in the piece. In both print and broadcast journalism, sound bites are conventionally juxtaposed and interspersed with commentary from the journalist to create a news story. A balanced news report is expected to contain sound bites representing both sides of the debate. This technique, however, can lead to biased reporting when a sound bite is selected for sensationalism, or is used to promote the point of view of one individual or group over another.

== Impact ==
In his book The Sound Bite Society, Jeffrey Scheuer argues that the sound bite was the product of television's increased power over all forms of communication, and that the resulting trend toward short, catchy snippets of information had a significant negative impact on American political discourse. In contrast, Peggy Noonan feels that sound bites have acquired a negative connotation but are not inherently negative, and that what we now think of as great historical sound bites—such as "The only thing we have to fear is fear itself", the most famous phrase in Franklin D. Roosevelt's first Inaugural Address—were examples of eloquent speakers unselfconsciously and "simply trying in words to capture the essence of the thought they wished to communicate."

The increased use of sound bites in news media has been criticized, and has led to discussions on journalistic and media ethics. According to the Code of Ethics of the Society of Professional Journalists, journalists should "make certain that headlines, news teases and promotional material, photos, video, audio, graphics, sound bites and quotations do not misrepresent. They should not oversimplify or highlight incidents out of context."

Despite this criticism, sound bites are widely employed by businesses, trade groups, labor unions and politicians. Senator Jim DeMint readily admitted this when he said, "There’s a reason why most politicians talk in sanitized sound bites: Once you get out of that, you’re opening yourself up to get attacked."

== Examples ==
- Ash heap of history
- Axis of evil
- Ever closer union
- Evil Empire speech
- Make America Great Again
- Manifest destiny
- Peace for our time
- Read my lips: no new taxes
- Shock and awe
- War on terror
- Weapons of mass destruction

== See also ==
- Buzzword
- Catchphrase
- Concision (media studies)
- Gotcha journalism
- Media clip
- Platitude
- Sheeple
- Slogan
- Sounds to Sample
- Spin (public relations)
