= Sample Magic =

British audio production company

- Launch date: 2006
- Website: www.samplemagic.com

Sample Magic is a pro-audio company with offices in London and Los Angeles.

They produce, publish and sell royalty-free musical elements, synthesizer presets, plugins and MIDI content via their online music store and third party distributors such as Beatport. The company works closely with major DAW and software developers including Ableton, Apple, Steinberg and Native Instruments.

The output and consistency of their products led M Magazine to label them “the world’s leading provider of pro-audio loops and samples to music producers across a range of genres” with a “reputation for providing bespoke samples to cater to the needs of a wide variety of music producers” according to Resident Advisor.

Sample Magic have also developed the Magic AB and Stacker plugins, receiving endorsements from a diverse range of music producers including Dave Pensado, Above & Beyond and Bobby Owsinski

In 2016 they announced SM Sounds, the company's new distribution portal aimed at retailing products from the world's leading sound design companies.

== History ==
Sample Magic was founded in 2006 by DJ/producer Sharooz Raoofi. The company was established to retail products designed specifically for electronic music producers across a range of genres.

Their reputation quickly grew following their award for Remix Magazine Technology's Best Sample Collection for 2007.

In 2010 Raoofi sold the Sounds to Sample store to the SFX owned electronic music retailer Beatport. That site was subsequently retired and now trades as Beatport Sounds.

In 2011 Sample Magic founded and funded a number of ventures including Attack Magazine and the London Electronic Music Event.

Since 2014 the company have retailed bespoke packs on leading audio software site Ableton.

Sample Magic has also provided sounds, patches and consultation services to a number of hardware synthesizer manufacturers including Korg, Akai Professional and Arturia.

== Samples ==
Their royalty-free sample products are encoded in a variety of formats, including 24-bit Wav, Rex2 loops, Apple Loops, Ableton Rack format, Kontakt, EXS24 and Reason ReFill formats.

== Publishing ==
In 2010, Sample Magic opened its publishing arm with the release of The Secrets of House Music Production, featuring interviews with leading producers such as Wolfgang Gartner and Way Out West. It received the MusicTech Choice Award and a rating of 9/10.

In 2011 Sample Magic released its second book, The Producer’s Manual, written by Sound On Sound Editor-in-Chief Paul White. The book focuses on traditional approaches to studio recording and production and details pro techniques, practical photos, illustrations and step-by-step walkthroughs. It too received critical praise.

Sample Magic published its third book in 2013, Classic Tracks, by New York Times best-selling author Richard Buskin. It details the true stories behind 68 seminal pop recordings from the likes of The Beatles, Nirvana, The xx, The Who and Justice.

== Courses ==
In 2012 Sample Magic began a series of summer music production courses in London, in collaboration with Alchemea audio college. The courses are taught by Sample Magic lecturers and industry professionals including mix engineers, mastering engineers and record label representatives.

== Plugins ==
Sample Magic entered the pro audio plugin market in 2012 with the release of Magic AB, a utility reference plugin allowing music producers to instantly switch between the project they're working on and up to nine user-loaded reference tracks.

Magic AB received many positive reviews, described as “ingenious” by Sound On Sound Magazine, “a simple idea that works perfectly” by Attack Magazine and "A plug-in that everyone could benefit from” by Music Tech Magazine.

In 2016 Sample Magic released Stacker, a drum layering utility aimed at the creation of unique drum sounds.

The product won Computer Music magazine's Innovation Award and was list as one of Music Radar's Drum Plugins of the Year.
