= The Anix =

Los Angeles-based electronic rock project

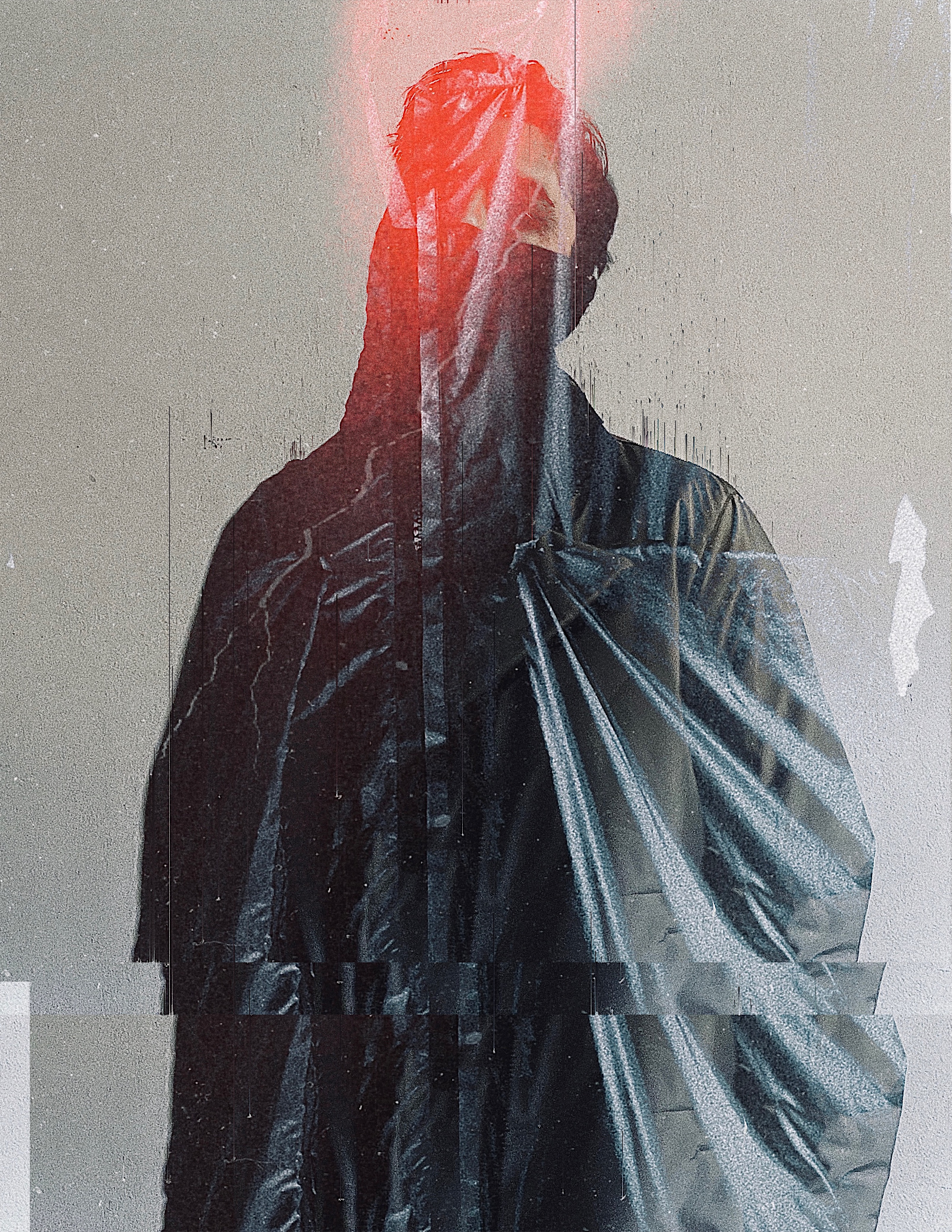
- Brandon Smith seen in his studio in 2020

Background information
- Origin: Los Angeles, California, U.S.
- Genres: Electronic rock; new wave; synth-rock; alternative rock; electronica
- Years active: 2001–present
- Labels: One Iron Records; Chamberlain Records; Cleopatra Records; FiXT (current)
- Members: Brandon Smith
- Past members: Oscar Gutierrez; Bryan Lareau; Chris Yarber; Nik Lawhorn; Logan Smith; Greg Nabours; Chris Dinger; Nikolas Musolino
- Website: https://theanix.com

The Anix is a former American rock band and currently a solo electronic project run by Los Angeles-based music producer Brandon Smith who was originally the band's frontman.

== History ==
=== Formation and release of "An Illusion of Time" and "Play.Dance.Repeat" (2001–2007) ===
The Anix was formed in 2001 by Brandon Smith, Bryan Lareau and Oscar Gutierrez. The band made various albums along the first two years of their existence (A Division of You, Digital Rock etc.) but they didn't receive much recognition. The band released their debut album, titled "An Illusion of Time" in 2004. The band's first label released album was "Play, Dance, Repeat" released in April 2005. The band then underwent multiple lineup changes before entering the studio in 2006 to record their next album.

=== Gaining recognition with "Demolition City" and release of "Sleepwalker" and "Ephemeral" (2008–2017) ===
The Anix's first critically acclaimed album was "Demolition City". The album was released in 2008 under Chamberlain records. A review was published about the album on Billboard Magazine's vol.120 no.22 issue. It praised the band's style of using 80's music as an inspiration.

The band played live shows in Illinois and Chicago with artist's Cromwell, Comasoft. In 2009 the band first played in overseas. Along with Apoptygma Berzerk, the band played various live shows in Germany.

The band then signed with Cleopatra Records and released their next album - "Sleepwalker". Released in 2011, the album received praise in the gaming community. The song "Warning Signs" was included in the soundtrack of Mass Effect: Paragon Lost. Smith said that the band is often inspired by film adaptations of graphic novels, like The Dark Knight and Sin City. They embarked on a North American tour with Cromwell in 2012. The band additionally played a few shows in 2013 and 2015.

The band's next album "Ephemeral" was released in 2017. The album contained elements from techno and dance music; a first for the band. Unlike after the release of its predecessor, the band didn't promote the album by going on tour.

=== Turning into a solo project and subsequent releases (2018–present) ===
Logotype of The Anix (2018-2022)

After the release of "Ephemeral" the band turned into a solo project with Brandon remaining the sole band member. He signed with electronic music label FiXT and released his debut single "Fight the Future". His sixth album, titled "Shadow_Movement", was released on 18 October 2018.

After releasing various singles Brandon released his seventh studio album "Hologram" on 10 October 2019. He released his eighth studio album, "Graphite", on 26 June 2020.

The Revenge LP, with 15 tracks, was released January 14, 2022. It includes guest appearances by Julien K, InHuman, and Amir Derakh (Julien K, Rough Cutt).

On July 15, 2022, Demolition City was remastered and released. The album contains all the previous songs (including "The Lowdown of a Fool", which was released under the name "Double Zero") and previously unreleased demos and songs.

On June 2, 2023, The Anix released its tenth studio album "Nightvision". On February 22, 2024, The Anix released a new single called CRAWL featuring Amir Derakh of Julien-K as a part of his upcoming tenth studio album "Voltage". On April 15 and May 28, "Gravity" and "Shadow" were released as the second and third single of The Anix's upcoming album.

== Members ==
Current members

- Brandon Smith – vocals, guitar, keyboards, bass, programming (2001–present)

Former members

- Oscar Gutierrez – drums (2001–2005)
- Bryan Lareau – guitar, bass, backing vocals (2001–2006)
- Chris Yarber – bass, synthesizer, backing vocals (2004–2008)
- Nik Lawhorn – guitar (2004–2008)
- Logan Smith – drums (studio and live: 2005–2018, live only: 2022, 2025)
- Greg Nabours – synthesizer, backing vocals (2008–2011)
- Chris Dinger – guitar, backing vocals (studio and live: 2009–2018, live only: 2022)
- Nikolas Musolino – guitar (2013–2017)

== Discography ==
=== Studio albums ===
Title	Album details
An Illusion of Time	Released: May 12, 2004; Label: Self-released; Formats: LP, CD, digital download, streaming
Play, Dance, Repeat	Released: April 15, 2005; Label: Universal Records; Format: LP, CD, digital download, streaming
Demolition City	Released: January 1, 2008; Label: Chamberlain Records; Format: LP, CD, digital download, streaming
Sleepwalker	Released: August 30, 2011; Label: Cleopatra Records; Format: LP, CD, digital download, streaming
Ephemeral	Released: March 31, 2017; Label: Cleopatra Records; Format: LP, CD, digital download, streaming
Shadow_Movement	Released: October 19, 2018; Label: FiXT; Format: LP, CD, digital download, streaming
Hologram	Released: October 11, 2019; Label: FiXT; Format: LP, CD, digital download, streaming
Graphite	Released: June 26, 2020; Label: FiXT; Format: LP, CD, digital download, streaming
Revenge	Released: January 14, 2022; Label: FiXT; Format: LP, CD, digital download, streaming
Demolition City 2022 Remaster	Released: July 15, 2022; Label: FiXT; Format: LP, CD, digital download, streaming
Nightvision	Released: June 2, 2023; Label: FiXT; Format: LP, CD, digital download, streaming
Voltage	Released: November 22, 2024; Label: FiXT; Format: LP, CD, digital download, streaming

=== Remix albums ===
1. Change (Remixes) (2003)
2. Dangerous (Remixes) (2005)

=== Compilation albums ===
1. Rare And Unreleased (2009)
2. Glass (Deconstructed) (2012)
3. Black Space (Deconstructed) (2019)
4. Night Of (2025)

=== Others ===
Title	Album details
A Division of You	Released: 2001
Digital Rock	Released: 2002
Double Zero	Released: 2003
Order / Disorder	Released: 2019

=== Singles ===
Song title	Release date	Album
"Take My Future"	2011	Sleepwalker
"Cry Little Sister" (Gerald McMahon cover)	2011	Sleepwalker
"Burn" (feat. Apoptygma Berzerk) (The Cure cover)	2011	Sleepwalker
"Glass"	2011	Sleepwalker
"Sideways"	March 10, 2017	Ephemeral
"Mask"	March 31, 2017	Ephemeral
"This Machine"	May 25, 2018	Shadow_Movement
"Come Back Down"	June 28, 2018	Shadow_Movement
"Fight the Future"	August 1, 2018	Shadow_Movement
"Incomplete"	August 18, 2018	Shadow_Movement
"Interchanger"	September 5, 2018	Shadow_Movement
"Black Space"	January 29, 2019	Shadow_Movement
"Techunter"	February 7, 2019	Hologram
"Chrome"	April 15, 2019	Hologram
"Everlasting Love"	May 9, 2019	Hologram
"Talking In My Sleep" (feat. Emmanuella)	June 7, 2019	Hologram
"Disappear"	July 11, 2019	Hologram
"If This World Is With You"	January 15, 2020	Graphite
"Still Standing"	February 28, 2020	Graphite
"Give It Up"	March 25, 2020	Graphite
"Parasite" (feat. GXG)	April 17, 2020	Graphite
"Hideaway"	May 8, 2020	Graphite
"Die With You"	June 3, 2020	Graphite
"Unveil"	November 8, 2020	Revenge
"Want U Like I Do"	January 29, 2021	Revenge
"My Eyes"	March 4, 2021	Revenge
"DSPTCH"	March 25, 2021	Revenge
"Your Lies Are Like Fire" (with Julien-K)	May 10, 2021	Revenge
"Follow"	June 25, 2021	Revenge
"Don't Let the Outside Win"	August 6, 2021	Revenge
"Antilife" (with Julien-K feat. Amir Derakh)	September 22, 2021	Revenge
"Quicksand" (with Inhuman)	November 12, 2021	Revenge
"Pretend" (with Intrelock)	December 3, 2021	Revenge
"Below"	December 10, 2021	Revenge
"Army of Me" (Björk cover)	April 1, 2022	Nightvision
"Spit You Out" (solo or with Daedric)	August 26, 2022	Nightvision
"See Nothing"	October 28, 2022	Nightvision
"Just Like You"	November 17, 2022	Nightvision
"Frozen Waves"	December 9, 2022	Nightvision
"Bleach"	February 3, 2023	Nightvision
"Cut Me"	April 14, 2023	Nightvision
"Missile"	May 4, 2023	Nightvision
"Tethered"	May 26, 2023	Nightvision
"Crawl" (feat. Julien-K)	February 22, 2024	Voltage
"Gravity"	April 15, 2024	Voltage
"Shadow"	May 28, 2024	Voltage
"Panic"	June 18, 2024	Voltage
"X-Ray"	July 18, 2024	Voltage
"Sinking Alone"	August 20, 2024	Voltage
"Locked Door"	September 30, 2024	Voltage
"Go"	October 17, 2024	Voltage
"Disarm"	November 5, 2024	Voltage
"Don't Count My Ashes"	April 6, 2026	TBA
"If You Feel Nothing"	September 30, 2026	TBA

=== As featured artist ===
- Pers Mantrum - Loading 99
- Fury Weekend - Illumination
- We Are Pigs - Brazen
- Julien-K - Desperation Day
- Nouveau Arcade feat. Cordélia - Apart
- HU3M3N - T3MPT3D
- Intrelock - Reminisce
- Fury Weekend - Delirious
- Void Chapter - Our Time Is Now
- Main-De-Gloire - Come Alive
- High Society - Harm

=== Covers ===
- Hey Man, Nice Shot by Filter
- Change (In the House of Flies) by Deftones
- Precious (Depeche Mode song) by Depeche Mode
- Burn by The Cure
- Cry Little Sister by Gerard McMahon feat. Apoptygma Berzerk
- Celestica by Crystal Castles
- New Year's Day by U2
- In The Air Tonight by Phil Collins
- Eye by The Smashing Pumpkins
- Army of Me by Björk
- Don't Stop by Innerpartysystem
- Digital Bath by Deftones

=== Music videos ===
Year	Song	Director(s)
2005	"Held Apart"	Monte Carlos
2005	"This Game"	Monte Carlos
2009	"Half the World Away"	Kurt Nishimura
2010	"Enemy Eyes"	Brandon Smith
2011	"Glass"	Chris Do
2012	"Glass" (Deconstructed)	Chris Do
2013	"Resident One"	Brandon Smith
2017	"Mask"	Ruslan Pelykh
2018	"This Machine"	Brandon Smith
2019	"Black Space"	Ruslan Pelykh
2020	"Die With You"	Brandon Smith
2021	"Your Lies Are Like Fire" (with Julien-K)	Oscar Gutierrez
2022	"Spit You Out"	Oscar Gutierrez
2023	"Bleach"	Oscar Gutierrez
2023	"Missile"	Oscar Gutierrez
2024	"Crawl" (feat. Julien-K)	Brandon Smith and Julien-K
2026	"Don't Count My Ashes"	Brandon Smith
