= Gotcha journalism =

Form of journalism

"Gotcha journalism" is a pejorative term used by media critics to describe interviewing methods that appear designed to entrap interviewees into making statements that are damaging or discreditable to their cause, character, integrity, or reputation. The term is rooted in an assertion that the interviewer may be supporting a hidden agenda, and aims to make film or sound recordings of the interviewee which may be selectively edited, compiled, and broadcast or published in order to intentionally show the subject in an unfavorable light. The term derives from the word "gotcha", a contracted form of "got you", and emerged in political journalism during the 1980s and 1990s.

== Techniques ==
Gotcha journalism can be used to get a subject with something genuinely discreditable to hide to reveal wrongdoing; there can be a fine line between robust and gotcha journalism. Some methods claimed to be gotcha journalism by those involved include moving away from the agreed upon topic of the interview and switching to an embarrassing subject that was agreed to be out-of-bounds and leading the interviewee to discuss it and commit to a certain answer, then, confronting them with prepared material designed to contradict or discredit that position.

Gotcha journalism is often designed to keep the interviewee on the defensive by, for example, being required to explain some of their own statements taken out of context thus effectively preventing the interviewee from clearly presenting their position. The intent of gotcha journalism is always premeditated and used to defame or discredit the interviewees by portraying them as self-contradictory, malevolent, unqualified or immoral.

Gotcha journalism is used as an excuse to evade a question to which the interviewee does not know the answer, where their lack of knowledge would make them appear foolish or uninformed, or a subject where their intellectual position contradicts their past statements. A 2020 poll by YouGov in the United Kingdom found that the public were frustrated with "repetitive gotcha" political questions being asked during press briefings about the COVID-19 pandemic.

== See also ==
- Concision (media studies)
- Gonzo journalism
- Investigative journalism
- Sound bite
