= SDS Sessions V.1 =

Live album by Julien-K
- Released: December 16, 2011
- Genre: Alternative rock; electronic rock; industrial rock
- Length: 18:34
- Label: Julien-K Inc.
- Producer: Julien-K

Julien-K chronology
Death to Analog (2009)	SDS Sessions V.1 (2011)	We're Here with You (2012)

SDS Sessions V.1 is the first live EP from American rock band Julien-K, recorded on August 9, 2011 at the Clouds Hill Studio in Hamburg, Germany. A limited number of vinyl copies and an early digital release was provided exclusively to members of the band's fan-club Systeme de Street.

The EP was included in its entirety as the 4 last tracks of the 4th CD on the box set Time Capsule: A Future Retrospective, released in 2018.

Someday Soon and Maestro are live renditions of Headcleanr and Koma & Bones remixes, respectively, from their remix album Death to Digital. Dregs Of The World was later remixed by Julien-K themselves and included on the deluxe edition of their album, We're Here With You, in 2012.

== Track listing ==
All tracks are written by Julien-K

No.	Title	Length
1.	"Someday Soon (Live Remix Version)"	3:14
2.	"Maestro (Live Remix Version)"	5:06
3.	"Fail With Grace (JK Live Version)"	5:27
4.	"Dregs Of The World (JK Live Version)"	4:49
Total length:		18:34
