= We're Here with You =

2012 studio album by Julien-K

Studio album by Julien-K
- Released: January 23, 2012
- Genre: Electronic rock; alternative rock; industrial rock; synth-pop
- Length: 49:31
- Label: Julien-K Inc.
- Producer: Julien-K

Julien-K chronology
SDS Sessions V.1 (2011)	We're Here with You (2012)	We're Here With You Remix EP (2012)

Deluxe Edition

Singles from We're Here with You
- 1. "Breakfast in Berlin" Released: December 30, 2011; 2. "We're Here With You" Released: March 1, 2012; 3. "Cruel Daze of Summer" Released: August 7, 2012; 4. "Nights of Future Past" Released: January 8, 2013

We're Here with You is the second studio album by the American electronic rock band Julien-K, which was released on January 23, 2012. The album was written by members Ryan Shuck and Amir Derakh, and produced by Julien-K. A deluxe edition is available for digital download on iTunes.

== Background ==
Julien-K collaborated with several friends in the writing and production of the album. Collaborations included on the record for the remix EP are Z-Listers, Motor, Sharooz, DJ Hyper, Benjamin Vial, and Sam Vandal.

== Promotion ==
To promote the album, a song that was originally recorded for inclusion on We're Here With You but was later removed from the final track listing, "The Hunting" (mixed by Jay Baumgardner), was released for free to fans who participated in a virtual game called The Hunt.

To complete the second part of The Hunt, fans were required to get "The Hunting" scrobbled by 1,000 listeners, and 10,000 scrobbles total on Last.fm, which then unlocked another unreleased non-album track "Everyone Knows". Derakh revealed that this was the first-ever Julien-K track, and the released demo remained unchanged from its first being recorded in 2004.

== Track listing ==
All tracks are written by Ryan Shuck and Amir Derakh.

No.	Title	Length
1.	"We're Here with You"	4:58
2.	"Surrounded by Cowards"	4:27
3.	"Cruel Daze of Summer"	6:23
4.	"Breakfast in Berlin"	4:15
5.	"Palm Springs Reset"	5:03
6.	"Colorcast"	4:44
7.	"Close Continuance"	4:43
8.	"Nights of Future Past"	5:25
9.	"Flashpoint Riot"	4:36
10.	"I'll Try Not to Destroy You"	5:00

iTunes Deluxe Edition bonus tracks
No.	Title	Length
11.	"Dregs of the World" (WHWY Mix)	4:48
12.	"Whore" (Julian Kaye Version)	5:01
13.	"1000 Years of Destruction"	4:59
14.	"Colorcast" (Decode Radio Remix)	5:46
15.	"Breakfast in Berlin" (La-Ex Remix)	4:46
16.	"Palm Springs Reset" (Battle Tapes Remix)	4:32
17.	"I'll Try Not to Destroy You" (Fourms Remix)	5:08
18.	"Nights of Future Past" (Polar Moon Remix)	5:40
19.	"We're Here With You" (Craig Williams Remix)	5:16
20.	"Breakfast in Berlin" (The Handclap Situation Remix)	7:07
21.	"Breakfast In Berlin" (Music Video)	4:16
22.	"Flashpoint Riot" (Music Video)	4:36
23.	"We're Here With You" (Music Video)	4:58
24.	"Cruel Daze of Summer" (Music Video)	6:42

=== Related tracks ===
No.	Title	Length
11.	"The Hunting (Jay Baumgardner Mix)" (Released via the virtual game The Hunt.)	4:27
12.	"Everyone Knows (2004 Demo)" (Released via the virtual game The Hunt.)	4:07

== We're Here With You Remix EP ==
We're Here with You Remix EP

Remix album by Julien-K
- Released: March 13, 2012
- Genre: Electronic rock; electro house; breaks; techno
- Length: 37:09
- Label: Circuit Freq Records
- Producer: Julien-K

Julien-K chronology
We're Here With You (2012)	We're Here with You Remix EP (2012)	California Noir - Chapter One: Analog Beaches & Digital Cities (2015)

No.	Title	Length
1.	"Flashpoint Riot (Neon Stereo Remix)"	5:29
2.	"Breakfast in Berlin (Sharooz Remix)"	5:26
3.	"Nights of Future Past (Vandal Remix)"	7:17
4.	"We're Here with You (Black Asteroid Remix)"	5:09
5.	"Surrounded by Cowards (Benjamin Vial Remix)"	6:42
6.	"Cruel Daze of Summer (Z-Listers Remix)""	7:10
