= Concision (media studies) =

Broadcast media censorship using time limit as rationale

In media studies, concision is a form of broadcast media censorship by limiting debate and discussion of important topics on the rationale of time allotment.

Media critics such as Noam Chomsky contend that this practice, especially on commercial broadcasts with advertising, encourages broadcasters to exclude people and ideas that they judge cannot conform to the time limits of a particular program. This leads to a limited number of "the usual suspects" who will say expected ideas that will not require extensive explanation such as mainstream political ones.

The beauty of concision, you know, saying a couple of sentences between two commercials, the beauty of that is you can only repeat conventional thoughts. Suppose I go on Nightline, whatever it is, two minutes, and I say Gaddafi is a terrorist, Khomeini is a murderer etcetera etcetera... I don't need any evidence, everyone just nods. On the other hand, suppose you're saying something that isn't just regurgitating conventional pieties, suppose you say something that's the least bit unexpected or controversial, people will quite reasonably expect to know what you mean. If you said that you'd better have a reason, better have some evidence. You can't give evidence if you're stuck with concision. That's the genius of this structural constraint.

Furthermore, introducing controversial or unexpected statements that do not conform to those conventional ideas are discouraged as time inefficient because the person will be required to explain and support them in detail. Since this can often take considerable time in itself and digress from the primary discussion topic of the broadcast, this is discouraged. Alternatively, the explanation could be subject to extensive editing for time which could lead to an inadequate presentation of the subject's thoughts.

== Illustration ==
This media control idea is illustrated in the film documentary, Manufacturing Consent: Noam Chomsky and the Media, where journalist Jeff Greenfield explains why a person like Chomsky may be excluded from being interviewed on air because he takes too long to warm up. The film then follows up with Chomsky himself explaining the concept while the film gives examples of controversial statements he has made in the past that would require extensive explanation in an interview.

The 1999 feature film The Insider has a dramatization of the media concept where journalist Mike Wallace goes public on a news show about the censoring of a controversial story on 60 Minutes. When Wallace sees his interview broadcast, he is furious that his testimony is limited to a curt statement that does not adequately explain his position and the only excuse from the producers he receives is that it had to be cut for time.

== See also ==
- Gotcha journalism
- Sound bite
