= Eli James =

American musician and fashion designer

eli james
- Born: Elijah Harvey James Rehaume; November 18, 1982 (age 43); Seattle, Washington
- Genres: (Electronic, Rock)
- Occupations: Musician, Producer, fashion designer
- Instruments: Drums, Producer
- Years active: 2006–present
- Website: www.ghostcircusapparel.com

Eli James is an American fashion designer and founder of the lifestyle clothing brand Ghost Circus Apparel. Previously, he was the drummer for Tim Sköld's industrial solo project, SKOLD; the electronic rock/indietronica/dance project Julien-K; and Dead By Sunrise, the alternative rock side project of Linkin Park frontman Chester Bennington. James also performs as a solo artist as The Eli James Experience and with fellow drummer Elias Andra in their joint project E.L.I.

== Early life ==
Eli James was born in Seattle, Washington, and spent his childhood in various locations throughout the Pacific Northwest. His father, Izzy Rehaume, a bass player for the metal band Rottweiller, raised James and his brothers alone, leading to frequent stays with extended family and shared resources during their upbringing. From a young age, James was exposed to the music industry through his father's band practices, instilling in him a passion for music that he later pursued as a career.

By the age of seven, James demonstrated a strong inclination for performance. Alongside his brothers, he staged acrobatics shows for friends in their backyard, continuing these performances until he received his first drum kit at age 12. Throughout his education—from elementary through high school—James participated in a variety of performance arts, including marching band, jazz band, choir, and drama. He also engaged in multiple sports such as football, soccer, and wrestling, but an injury during a football game eventually led him to reconsider his career aspirations.

In 2000, James relocated to Los Angeles, where he acted in commercials and films for four years. He has been credited with 250 stage performances, seven films, and a television show appearance. His commitment to music was solidified in 2005 after participating in the Tsunami Disaster Relief efforts, which highlighted the impact of goodwill through music. His decision was further reinforced during the International Music Convention in 2006 in Barbados, an event attended by notable figures such as David Campbell, Justin Meldal-Johnsen, and Juliette Simms.

== Music career ==
At this time, Eli put himself in a position to travel all over the U.S. and Canada to write music. After a few years of traveling and creating his studio he had the opportunity to work with producer John Ryan (Styx, Santana, Lynyrd Skynyrd, Doobie Brothers, Seal, etc.).

By 2008, Eli was living in downtown LA in an artist loft with his brothers, Joseph and Patrick, and friends Davan and Sonny Moore. It was during this time Patrick, aka DJ Magi, taught Sonny the DJ skills he would go on to use as Skrillex. As Sonny began to play more and more gigs and eventually book a tour as a DJ act, Eli decided to go on tour with him to drum tech for drummer, Sean Friday, however illness kept him from doing so. While he was recovering, he realized he needed to focus on making his own music again and once better, he hit the ground running full speed in that direction.

In May 2008 Eli ran into a close friend, Jason Spallino, aka Zuzu Gold, at a local LA show where Sonny Moore, Dead Sara and Endless Hallway were performing (The Knitting Factory). This is where Jason and Eli spoke about drumming for Little Red Radio.

After Eli joined Little Red Radio – whose members included Jason Bradly Shaffer (keys/programming), Jason Spallino (lead vocals) and Lara Meghan Anderson (lead vocals) – the band was on a non-stop ride towards success getting "Local Track of the Day" on LA's Indie 103.1 FM within 6 months and performing with bands such as Black Eyed Peas, LMFAO, The Pussycat Dolls, Mickey Avalon, Neon Trees, Kelis, Skrillex, Steel Panther, Spazmatics, Policics (Japan), Ebony Bones (UK) and many others. During this time Eli James began working with lighting designer, Adam Williams. Adam and Eli worked hand in hand continually pushing the envelope with Little Red Radio's level of live entertainment. With the energy and music of the band, plus the light sequences that Adam helped Eli develop, there was no other show in LA quite like it. Little Red Radio played many packed out venues such as The Key Club, On The Rox, The Roxy, The Viper Room, House of Blues, Silverlake Lounge, The Satellite, The Echo, The Echoplex, Club Avalon, Steve Aoki's Dim Mak, countless warehouse parties and club nights. Creative differences amongst its members proved to be too much for the band's survival, so Eli left the band in April 2011.

In doing so, and with Adam Williams' help, The eli james Experience! was born. Playing a packed house at his first show in Los Angeles (Club Bardot) lead to Eli immediately going on 4 solo tours nationwide. He wrapped his 3rd tour headlining The Viper Room at The Sunset Strip Music Festival (SSMF) 2011 where he and good friend/sponsor, Scott Dowers (Hairroxx), met DJ Ashba. After Scott Dowers and DJ Ashba caught a few of Eli's live shows they both later decided to join AWP and help support/sponsor "The eli james Experience!" with their companies, Hairroxx and Ashba Swag. After Eli finished his 4th tour doing double duty as The eli james Experience! and drumming for (UK's) Viva City, he was referred through friends to replace Elias Andra drumming for the bands Julien-K and Dead By Sunrise. Instead of going with just one drummer, it was decided to have two, Eli and Frank Zummo of Street Drum Corps. At that time, Eli was also drumming for a few of LA's local bands including The Dark and Vera Mesmer, Nadja Peulen's (Coal Chamber) latest endeavor, plus making appearances in music videos for Julien-K's "We're Here With You" and September Mourning's "Before The Fall".

Eli's first show with Julien-K was at The Roxy Theatre, August 2012, direct support for Filter. Eli then drummed for Julien-K's 2012 European Tour which then lead to Julien-K jumping on MSI's European tour as their direct support. During this tour Eli got offered to drum for Deuce's USA tour which began in December 2012. After coming home from the Julien-K tour, Eli released his first EP "Fashion and a Toy" November 16, 2012. Then it was right back out on the road, drumming for Deuce and doing a remix for his single, "America". On March 29, 2012, the single "Unforgettable", with singer/rapper Av Does It was released on which Eli did all of the production. He then produced, wrote and sang on his own first single, "Heart Attack!", which was released July 19, 2013. In August, Eli drummed with Julien-K for The V-Rox Festival co-headlining with Mumiy Troll in Vladivostok, Russia.

As soon as Eli returned from Russia, he went out on his 5th US tour as The eli james Experience!, playing clubs of all shapes and sizes after a very successful Kickstarter campaign which helped fund it. During this tour he met up with good friend, Bones Elias, which led to the creation of E.L.I. (Egotistical Loud Instruments). It fell into place and they played their first show at The Roxy Theatre December 6, 2013 to help support Toys For Tots. After this 5th run, Eli decided to take The eli james Experience! worldwide, traveling to Australia at the end of December 2013 and spent the first 2 weeks of 2014 touring Down Under. Once back from tour, the pre-production for the "Heart Attack!" music video went into full effect.

In 2014 Eli celebrated EJE's 3-year anniversary mark/welcome home show in collaboration with brother/illusionist Joseph Réohm at The Federal Bar in North Hollywood. After a brief stint filling in as Wayne Static's drummer for a couple of months, which included a performance on BiteSizeNetwork's online metal show, and with the "Heart Attack!" music video in post-production, Eli went back into the studio with Julien-K on their 3rd album.

== Fashion career ==
Eli started making his own clothing for photo shoots and stage performances while in his various bands in order to create his own unique look as an artist. His musician friends began to take notice and request their own versions of his clothing, so in early 2015 he launched GhostCircus Apparel with the idea to create unique and one-of-a-kind specialty garments for performers in the music/entertainment industry.

He has made clothing for Tim Skold (Marilyn Manson/KMFDM), Frank Zummo (SUM 41/Krewella), Josh Dunn from 21 Pilots, Adrian Young from No Doubt/Dream Car, Adam Ross (Demi Lovato), Ryan Shuck and Amir Derakh from Julien-K and Dead By Sunrise, Bryce Soderberg from Lifehouse and Komox, Robbie Angelucci (Dee Snider/Twisted Sister), Jahan and Yasmine Yousaf from Krewella, magician Joseph Réohm, Kevin "Thrasher", Robert Ortiz and Craig Mabbitt from Escape The Fate, Tara Conner (Miss USA, 2006) and many more.

After achieving such a positive response to his designs and rapid success with GhostCircus, he expanded the brand to include his own eponymous clothing line, Eli James clothing, in 2017 and launched GhostCircus Merch where he helps other clothing brands grow their companies and brand visions in every step of the garment making process - cut and sew, bleaching and dyeing, in-house embroidery, and wholesale ventures.
