= Death to Analog =

2009 album by Julien-K

Studio album by Julien-K
- Released: March 10, 2009
- Genre: Electronic rock; dance-rock; alternative dance
- Length: 59:27 (Original Release); 63:34 (Worldwide Release); 75:50 (European Release)
- Label: Metropolis Records US, Tiefdruck-Musik EU
- Producer: Julien-K; Tim Palmer; Chester Bennington

Julien-K chronology
Death to Analog (2009)	Death to Digital (2011)

Singles from Death to Analog
- 1. "Kick the Bass" Released: February 17, 2009; 2. "Dreamland" Released: August 27, 2010

Professional ratings
Review scores
Source	Rating
InYourSpeakers	(Positive)
Rock on Request	(favorable)

Death to Analog is the debut studio album by the American rock band Julien-K. The album initially had a limited release in the US on March 10, 2009, before a digital worldwide release on October 20. The European Digi-Pak version, containing three more songs, was released on March 5, 2010.

The album was originally set to be released on February 17, 2009, to coincide with the switchover from analog to digital television broadcasting in the US. However, the album's release date was ultimately delayed to March 10.

== Release ==
On January 7, 2009, Ryan Shuck confirmed the album's release date on the band's MySpace page and said that the release would be handled by Metropolis Records. The track list was also confirmed on the Metropolis Records website, along with the following press release:

"Julien-K is the brainchild of two of the founding members of the platinum selling group Orgy: Amir Derakh and Ryan Shuck. Fusing the elements of dark electronic club music with styles of modern rock & pop, Julien-K are at the forefront of the electronic music scene. Joined by drummer Elias Andra and studio collaborator and cohort Brandon Belsky on keyboards & vocals, Julien-K push the boundaries of what traditional electronic music is supposed to be with explosive live performances that are larger than life. Executive Produced by Chester Bennington of Linkin Park, their debut album Death to Analog provides a sweeping landscape of musical influences and themes that pull the listener into their world on a first listen; A world where technology is fused with artistic expression in a way that has not been attempted before."

The album was mixed by the producer/engineer Tim Palmer, who has worked with The Cure, Dead or Alive, Gene Loves Jezebel, HIM and U2.

After the initial limited release on March 10, 2009, the album was released on vinyl on April 7.

=== Singles ===
On January 23, 2009, Julien-K's Myspace page announced that, on February 17, 2009, their first single "Kick the Bass" (with "Dreamland" as a B-side) would be released digitally, coinciding with the planned end of analog television in North America. The explicit video has a sexual theme, including references to bondage and has a cannibalistic twist to it. The video was offered in two versions for different tastes, a clean version as well as an explicit one, with the clean version being released at a later date.

As a teaser, the explicit version of the video was released exclusively on February 10 on Playboy Online which also had a cameo appearance by Linkin Park's lead vocalist, Chester Bennington, his wife Talinda, and Julien-K's Director of Activities Church. The site also offered a three-day trial to coincide with the release, though verification of age (18+) was needed.

"Dreamland" was released as the second single from the album on August 27, 2010.

== Track listing ==
All tracks are written by Julien-K.

No.	Title	Length
1.	"Death to Analog"	5:15
2.	"Someday Soon"	4:12
3.	"Kick the Bass"	3:42
4.	"Technical Difficulties"	4:20
5.	"Systeme de Sexe"	5:26
6.	"Maestro"	3:30
7.	"Forever"	4:29
8.	"Spiral"	3:22
9.	"Nvr Say Nvr" (Romeo Void cover)	4:01
10.	"Dystopian Girl"	5:01
11.	"Look at U"	3:47
12.	"Stranded"	3:57
13.	"Disease"	3:56
14.	"Futura (DTA Mix)"	4:29
Total length:		59:27

European edition bonus tracks
No.	Title	Length
15.	"Dreamland"	4:07
16.	"Killing Fields"	5:16
17.	"Maestro" (Brandon Belsky Remix)	7:00
Total length:		75:50

Worldwide digital release bonus digital downloads
No.	Title	Length
16.	"Maestro" (Brandon Belsky Remix)	7:00
17.	"Kick the Bass" (Virgin Tears and Fu Remix)	6:37
18.	"Technical Difficulties" (iPunk Remix)	5:42
19.	"Disease" (Chris Holmes Ashtar Command Remix)	5:39
20.	"Technical Difficulties" (Bryan Black Remix)	6:37
21.	"Technical Difficulties" (Bryan Black Synth Attak Remix)	5:56

- All tracks are available on purchase of worldwide release of the album.

Vinyl edition bonus tracks
No.	Title	Length
15.	"Spiral" (Paul Oakenfold Remix)	6:36
16.	"Kick the Bass" (She Wants Revenge Remix)	4:56

=== Death to Digital ===
Death to Digital

Remix album by Julien-K
- Released: March 10, 2009 (worldwide)
- Genre: Alternative rock; electronic rock; industrial rock
- Length: 59:34
- Label: Julien-K Inc.
- Producer: Julien-K

Julien-K chronology
Death to Analog (2009)	Death to Digital (2009)	Death to Digital X (2010)

All tracks are written by Julien-K.

No.	Title	Length
1.	"Someday Soon (Headcleanr Remix)"	3:10
2.	"Maestro (Koma + Bones Remix)"	6:33
3.	"Spiral (Paul Oakenfold Remix)"	6:32
4.	"Kick the Bass (She Wants Revenge Remix)"	4:57
5.	"Disease (Franz & Shape Remix)"	5:06
6.	"Stranded (Jagz Kooner Remix)"	4:59
7.	"Forever (Bon Harris Remix)"	6:25
8.	"Systeme de Sexe (Combichrist Remix)"	6:17
9.	"Death to Analog (Mike Shinoda Remix)"	4:06
10.	"Look At U (Deadmau5 Remix)"	4:59
11.	"Technical Difficulties (Photek Remix)"	6:34

=== Death to Digital X ===
Death to Digital X

Remix album by Julien-K
- Released: April 27, 2010 (worldwide/digital)
- Genre: Alternative rock; electronic rock; industrial rock
- Length: 96:59
- Label: Level 7
- Producer: Julien-K

Julien-K chronology
Death to Digital (2009)	Death to Digital X (2010)	SDS Sessions V.1 (2011)

All tracks are written by Julien-K.

No.	Title	Length
1.	"Someday Soon (Headcleanr Remix)"	3:08
2.	"Stranded (Jagz Kooner Remix)"	4:58
3.	"Disease (Franz & Shape Remix)"	5:07
4.	"Forever (Bon harris Remix)"	6:23
5.	"Kick the Bass (She Wants Revenge Remix)"	4:55
6.	"Systeme de Sexe (Combichrist Remix)"	6:21
7.	"Death to Analog (Mike Shinoda Remix)"	4:05
8.	"Technical Difficulties (Photek Remix)"	6:34
9.	"Dreamland (Dave the Hustler - In Hustler's Dreams Remix)"	6:10
10.	"Technical Difficulties (iPunk Remix)"	5:41
11.	"Death to Analog (Tim Palmer's Xtended Dub)"	6:31
12.	"Someday Soon (Fu's Dirty Edit)"	6:50
13.	"Systeme de Sexe (iPunk Remix)"	4:51
14.	"Technical Difficulties (Bryan Black Remix)"	6:15
15.	"Maestro (Brandon Belsky Remix)"	6:59
16.	"Technical Difficulties (Bryan Black Synth Attak)"	5:56
17.	"Disease (Chris Holmes Remix)"	5:38
