= Julien-K =

American electronic rock band

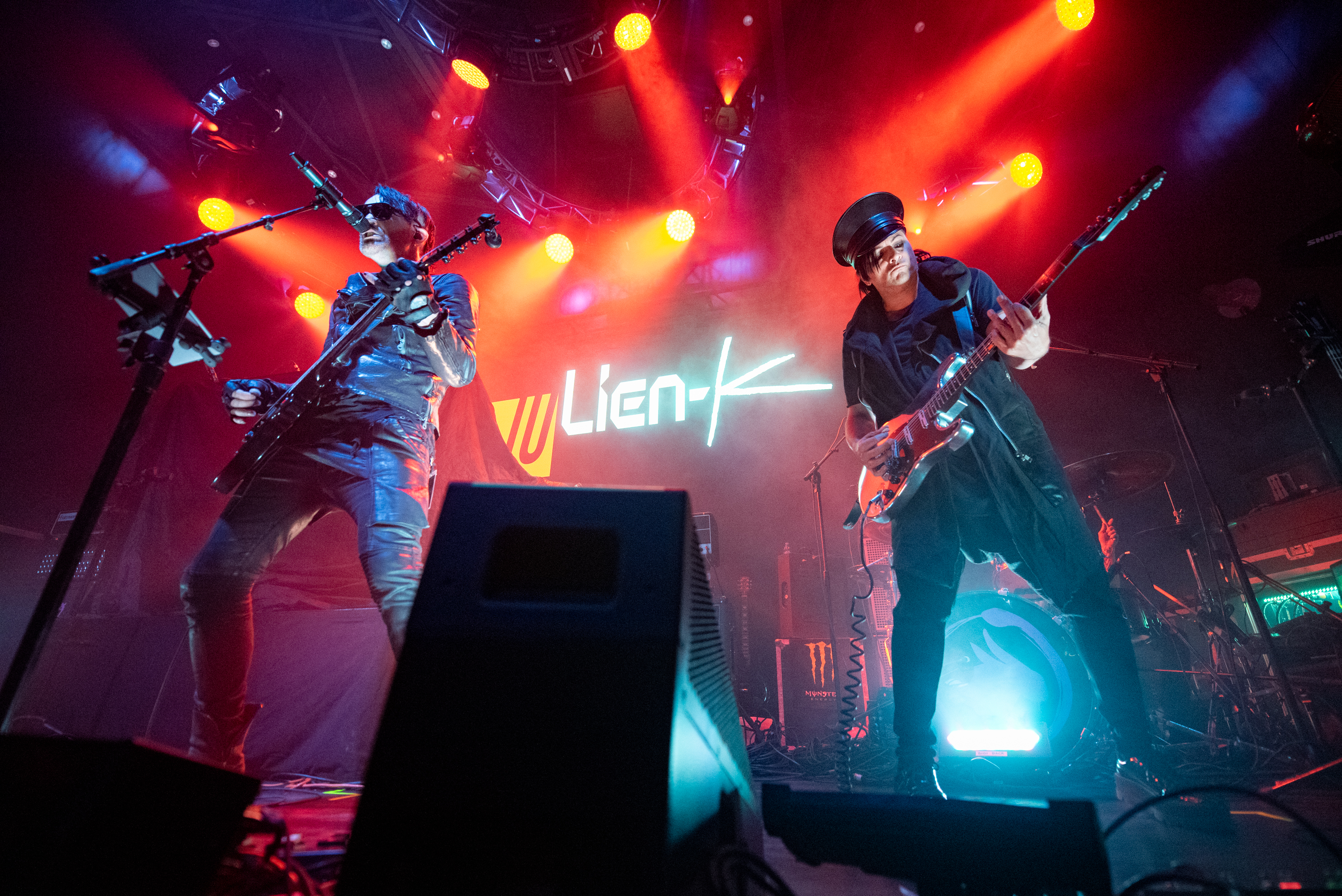
- Julien-K performing in Nashville, Tennessee in 2018

Background information
- Origin: Long Beach, California, U.S.
- Genres: Electronic rock; industrial rock; indietronica; industrial metal
- Years active: 2003–present
- Labels: Metropolis; Level 7; Circuit Freq
- Members: Ryan Shuck; Amir Derakh; Galen Waling
- Past members: Brandon Belsky; Bobby Hewitt; Bidi Cobra; Elias 'Bones' Rodriguez; Anthony 'Fu' Valcic
- Website: julienk.store

Julien-K is an American electronic rock band based in Long Beach, California, that began as a side project for electronic music created by Amir Derakh and Ryan Shuck from Orgy, alongside Anthony 'Fu' Valcic.

The band's name comes from the movie American Gigolo, where Richard Gere's character was named Julian Kaye.

== History ==
After the release of Orgy's third album, Punk Statik Paranoia, internal conflicts within the band caused Shuck and Derakh to find themselves writing songs that lead vocalist Jay Gordon had no interest in working on. The pair opted to continue writing and recording material, with Shuck stepping in on vocals, before deciding to launch their own side project with the addition of drummer Elias 'Bones' Rodriguez and keyboardist Brandon Belsky.

Julien-K's webpage was launched in the summer of 2003 with initial demo versions of songs "Look at You", "Kick the Bass", "Someday Soon", "Everyone Knows", and "Technical Difficulties", the latter of which was later featured both in the film and on the soundtrack from Michael Bay's 2007 Transformers. They also lent musical contributions to the soundtracks several video games, including Sonic Heroes ("This Machine"), Shadow the Hedgehog ("Waking Up"), and the musical score for the 2009 Transformers: Revenge of the Fallen video game.

Their debut album, Death to Analog, which was mixed by Tim Palmer, was released on March 10, 2009, in the US, and later on March 5, 2010, in Europe. The album was initially planned to be released on February 17, 2009, the date the United States switched from analog to digital television.

We're Here with You, the band's second album, was released on January 23, 2012.

Julien-K's third album, California Noir was released in two 'chapters' as a double album, with Chapter One – Analog Beaches & Digital Cities – in March 2015 and Chapter Two – Nightlife in Neon – in August 2016. The band started Indiegogo campaigns to support the funding of each, each with goal of collecting $10,000, which were both reached in just one day with the final totals surpassing $28,000 for Chapter One and $43,000 for Chapter Two.

In May 2017 the band announced Time Capsule: A Future Retrospective, a four-disc 64-track set of previously unreleased material, and again launched an Indiegogo campaign to fund it, reaching almost $12,000 of the $15,000 goal in less than two hours, once again meeting their goal within a day, and ultimately finishing the campaign with $50,520. In the summer of the same year, Julien-K toured as direct support for the band PIG, which consists of former members of the pioneering industrial rock outfit KMFDM. They were also joined by electro-rock band Ghostfeeder.

On July 18, 2018, they announced their fifth album, Harmonic Disruptor via another Indiegogo campaign. The album's concept is a homage to the style that Julien-K were known for when they first started out as a group, during the Death to Analog era, with a much darker and heavier industrial metal sound. It was eventually released on April 17, 2020.

On March 4, 2024, they announced "DRK|MODE" via another Indiegogo campaign. They surpassed their $10,000 goal, selling over $25,000 of merchandise by the end of day 1. By the end of the campaign, they had reached a total of $41,834. DRK|MODE was eventually released in October 2025.

On August 4, 2025, Julien K announced a new live online Simulcast concert recording named "Ritual - Live From The Void", with plans to record the show as a new live album CD, and fans could sign up by donating to the new project on their website. Within the first day they quickly exceeded the $10,000 donations goal. The concert took place on Viemo on the 29th of August, and was released on CD a month later.

== Collaborations ==
Julien-K collaborated with the late Chester Bennington, former Linkin Park lead vocalist, to perform the song "Let Down" for the ReAct Now: Music & Relief televised concert.

The Julien-K production team of Derakh, Shuck and Valcic also worked with Chester Bennington to perform an exclusive version of the song "Morning After" for the Underworld: Evolution soundtrack and for the remix album of the band Mindless Self Indulgence's "What Do They Know?". The track was released as a bonus remix on Another Mindless Rip Off, with a completely "Instrumental DJ Dub" version being released for free download on their official website.

Julien-K has also collaborated on Chester Bennington's solo project, the band called Dead by Sunrise. Dead by Sunrise has since released their debut album Out of Ashes on October 13, 2009. The band was on hiatus ever since. With Bennington's passing in 2017, its fate is currently unknown.

Both bands are the same. The one where Chester sings and writes is Dead by Sunrise, but when I sing, and Amir and I are the primary writers, it becomes Julien-K and it's more electro... Julien-K and Dead by Sunrise are basically a creative collective, we're sort of a Warhol-style factory in that sense; Dead by Sunrise is Chester's Julien-K if that makes any sense.

During Projekt Revolution 2007, Bennington replaced lead singer Ryan Shuck for the Chicago date of the tour while Shuck attended his brother's wedding.

Julien-K, mostly Amir, collaborated with Brandon Smith of The Anix for three singles, "ANTILIFE", "Your Lies Are Like Fire" and a live acoustic cover of "Where Is My Mind?" by Pixies, all of which appeared on The Anix's studio album REVENGE in 2022. They would continue to collaborate over the next few years, releasing the singles "DESPERATION DAY" shortly after the album, and "CRAWL" in 2024.

== Touring ==
In 2007, prior to the release of their debut album, Julien-K was on the main stage for Linkin Park's Projekt Revolution tour and one of the opening bands for Evanescence's North American "The Open Door" tour, and followed it up in 2008 opening for Mindless Self Indulgence, with supporting bands Fake Shark – Real Zombie!, London After Midnight, The Birthday Massacre and Combichrist.

In July 2010 the band announced their first European tour, scheduled for August and September, playing in Germany, Netherlands, France and England.

Julien-K appeared as the musical guest at the fourth annual Summer of Sonic fan convention in London on June 25, 2011, as part of their second European tour.

Following the release of We're Here with You, the band embarked on their third European tour, supporting Mindless Self Indulgence in fall 2012.

In 2024 they did back to back tours supporting metal band Powerman 5000.

== Band members ==
Current members

- Ryan Shuck – vocals, rhythm guitar, keyboards (2003–present)
- Amir Derakh – lead guitar, samples, keyboards, synthesizers, bass (2003–present)
- Galen Waling – drums (2016–2018, 2021–present)

Session and live members

- Brandon Belsky – keyboards, bass, backing vocals (2003–2010, 2013)
- Bobby Hewitt – drums (2016)
- Alex Gonzales – drums (2018–2019)
- Paige Haley – bass (2020)
- Elias 'Bones' Rodriguez – live drums, backing vocals (2003–2010, 2020)
- Bidi Cobra – keyboards, bass, backing vocals (2017–2021)
- Anthony 'Fu' Valcic – bass, keyboards, programming, samples (2010–present)

== JK DJS ==
Aside from the band, Amir Derakh and Brandon Belsky used to DJ under the moniker of JK DJS. They did their first DJ performance together December 31, 2007, at a hotel resort in Del Mar (San Diego), California. Since then they have played numerous shows and have released some of their DJ sets as free downloads from their MySpace. However, since Brandon is no longer a part of Julien-K, it can be assumed that the project has been discontinued.

=== Released DJ sets ===
- Fuck Me I'm Famous (2008)
- Deviant Din (2008)
- Electric Summer (2008)

=== JK DJ's edits ===
- Cities In Dust (JK DJS Edit)
- Spiral (Felix Cartal Remix) (JK DJS Edit)

== Discography ==
- Death to Analog (2009)
- SDS Sessions V.1 (2011)
- We're Here with You (2012)
- California Noir – Chapter One: Analog Beaches & Digital Cities (2015)
- California Noir – Chapter Two: Nightlife in Neon (2016)
- Harmonic Disruptor (2020)
- DRK/MODE (2025)

== Music videos ==
Year	Title	Album
2009	"Kick the Bass"	Death to Analog
2011	"Fail with Grace"	SDS Sessions V.1
2012	"Breakfast in Berlin"	We're Here with You
2012	"Flashpoint Riot"	We're Here with You
2012	"We're Here with You"	We're Here with You
2012	"Cruel Daze of Summer"	We're Here with You
2013	"Nights of Future Past"	We're Here with You
2014	"No You Can't"	California Noir: Analog Beaches & Digital Cities
2014	"California Noir"	California Noir: Analog Beaches & Digital Cities
2015	"Futura (DTA Mix)"	Death to Analog
2016	"Mannequin Eyes"	California Noir: Nightlife in Neon
2020	"Shut Down Your Soul"	Harmonic Disruptor
2021	"Your Lies Are Like Fire" (with The Anix)	
2023	"Your Tears Mean Nothing"	DRK/MODE
2024	"All That Glitters"	DRK/MODE
