= ReAct Now: Music & Relief =

2005 Hurricane Katrina benefit concert

ReAct Now: Music & Relief was a four-and-a-half-hour-long benefit concert which aired on September 10, 2005. MTV, VH1, CMT, MTV2, MTVU, VH1 Classic and The N broadcast the concert for Hurricane Katrina relief efforts via the American Red Cross, the Salvation Army, and America's Second Harvest (which has been changed to Feeding America in 2008).

== Performers and setlists in order ==
- Alicia Keys – "You'll Never Walk Alone" (New York City)
- Kid Rock & Lynyrd Skynyrd – "Sweet Home Alabama" (Nashville)
- Kelly Clarkson – "Shelter" (Los Angeles)
- Jon Stewart in New York City
- Green Day – "Wake Me Up When September Ends" (Foxborough)
- The Rolling Stones – "Waiting on a Friend" (Milwaukee)
- John Mayer Trio – "Gravity" (Los Angeles)
- David Banner – "Cadillacs on 22" (New York City)
- Rob Thomas – "Time After Time" (New York City)
- Buckwheat Zydeco – "I'm Gonna Love You Anyway" (Nashville)
- Coldplay – "Fix You" (New York City)
- Big & Rich – "I Pray For You" (Chicago)
- Trent Reznor – "Non-Entity", "Hurt" (Los Angeles)
- Jon Stewart in New York City
- Sheryl Crow – "Good Is Good" (New York City)
- Bon Jovi – "Someday I'll Be Saturday Night" (Chicago)
- George Lopez in Los Angeles
- U2 – "Love and Peace or Else" (Toronto)
- Common – "It's Your World" (Los Angeles)
- Beck – "Everybody's Got to Learn Sometime" (Los Angeles)
- The Neville Brothers – "Brother" (Nashville)
- Dashboard Confessional – "Ghost of a Good Thing" (New York City)
- Pearl Jam – "Given to Fly" (Saskatoon)
- Jewel – "Life Uncommon" (Los Angeles)
- 3 Doors Down – "Here by Me" (Charleston)
- Neil Young & Emmylou Harris – "This Old Guitar" (Nashville)
- Kanye West – "Touch the Sky" (Los Angeles)
- Kurt Loder in New York City
- Elton John – "Porch Swing in Tupelo" (Toronto)
- John Corbett in Nashville
- Marc Broussard – "Home" (Nashville)
- Melissa Etheridge – "Four Days" (Los Angeles)
- Mötley Crüe & Chester Bennington – "Home Sweet Home" (Nashville)
- Dennis Quaid in Los Angeles
- Brian Wilson – "Walking Down the Path of Life" / "Love and Mercy" (Los Angeles)
- Alan Jackson – "Rainy Day in June" (New York City)
- Maroon 5 – "Don't Let Me Down" (Los Angeles)
- Staind – "Right Here" (Charleston)
- David Banner in New York City
- Goo Goo Dolls – "Give a Little Bit" (Los Angeles)
- John Mellencamp – "Walk Tall" (Morrison, Colorado)
- Sugarland – "Stand Back Up" (Nashville)
- Chris Rock in New York City
- Red Hot Chili Peppers – "Under the Bridge" (Los Angeles)
- The Game – "Dreams" (Los Angeles)
- Paul McCartney – "Fine Line" (Miami)
- Chris Thomas King – "What Would Jesus Do" (Nashville)
- Dave Matthews Band – "American Baby" (Bonner Springs, Kansas)
- Hank Williams Jr – "Backwater Blues" (Nashville)
- Good Charlotte – "We Believe" (Los Angeles)
- Audioslave – "Doesn't Remind Me" (Los Angeles)
- Dead by Sunrise – "Let Down" (Nashville)
- Fiona Apple – "Extraordinary Machine" (Los Angeles)
- Alan Toussaint – "With You in Mind" (New York City)
- The Radiators – "Last Getaway" (Los Angeles)
- Dennis Quaid in Los Angeles
- Neil Young and the Fisk Jubilee Singers – "Walking to New Orleans" (Nashville)

== Simple Plan appearance cancellation ==
Canadian pop-punk band Simple Plan cancel their appearance at the concert after its lead singer Pierre Bouvier was hit by a bottle while performing their song "Welcome to My Life" at the Ovation Music Festival in Stratford, Ontario and was taken to a nearby hospital shortly after, where he received an closed number of stitches.
