= Sounds to Sample =

Sounds to Sample is a UK-based website that sells copyright free audio samples and loops for use in music production. It was launched in 2007 (18 years ago) by Sharooz Raoofi and David Felton, initially as a digital download portal for the Sample Magic libraries, and expanded to include developers such as Sony, Zero G and Best Service. In addition to its retail function, the site contains a number of articles on sound production and technical interviews with electronic music artists such as Chris Lake, Dave Audé, Dean Coleman and Wolfgang Gartner.

Products can be purchased in WAV, Apple Loops Utility or REX2 format, either as an exact copy of their physical format or as a cut down 'sample pack' offering only selected portions of content. Titles can be auditioned using a dedicated pop-up sound player and purchased using PayPal or conventional credit cards via the Worldpay system. Once a user account has been established, there is a facility to download free samples from the site's bestselling titles. As of January 2009 the site had 30,000 registered users and served over 10,000 transactions.
