= Sharooz =

British DJ

Sharooz Raoofi is an electronic music artist, producer and entrepreneur. His work has appeared on a variety of record labels such as Modular and Fool's Gold. Raoofi is the founder of ventures Sample Magic, Audiaire, Attack Magazine and the Principle Pleasure recording studio in Los Angeles.

He has remixed a range of artists including Moby, Robyn and Craig David.

Sharooz has featured in numerous studio based articles, including Future Music magazine's cover, FACT Magazine's In The Studio and T-Mobile's Electronic Beats video series. Under various guises he has written works for motion pictures including the Palme d'Or nominated Rust and Bone and the Netflix series Baby. Sharooz has worked as a sound designer on Roland's TR8-S drum machine, System-8 synthesiser, Steinberg's Cubase software, Korg's Minilogue synthesiser, Microsampler, Gadget iPad app, Electribe and Kronos workstation, programming patches and loops.

Raoofi was a co-founder of the Sounds to Sample website, which was acquired by US based music download company Beatport.

In October 2017, Raoofi performed live for Red Bull Music Academy working on an improvised composition with several vintage synthesisers for a live Facebook stream.

In October 2018, Billboard announced that New York based VC funded startup Splice had purchased Raoofi's Sample Magic venture for an undisclosed sum.

In February 2019, the software synthesiser Zone, developed by Raoofi under the Audiaire brand was awarded Music Tech magazine's Choice Award.

In July 2020, Variety reported that a publishing company founded by Raoofi had been acquired by music company BMG.
