= Ryan Shuck =

American musician

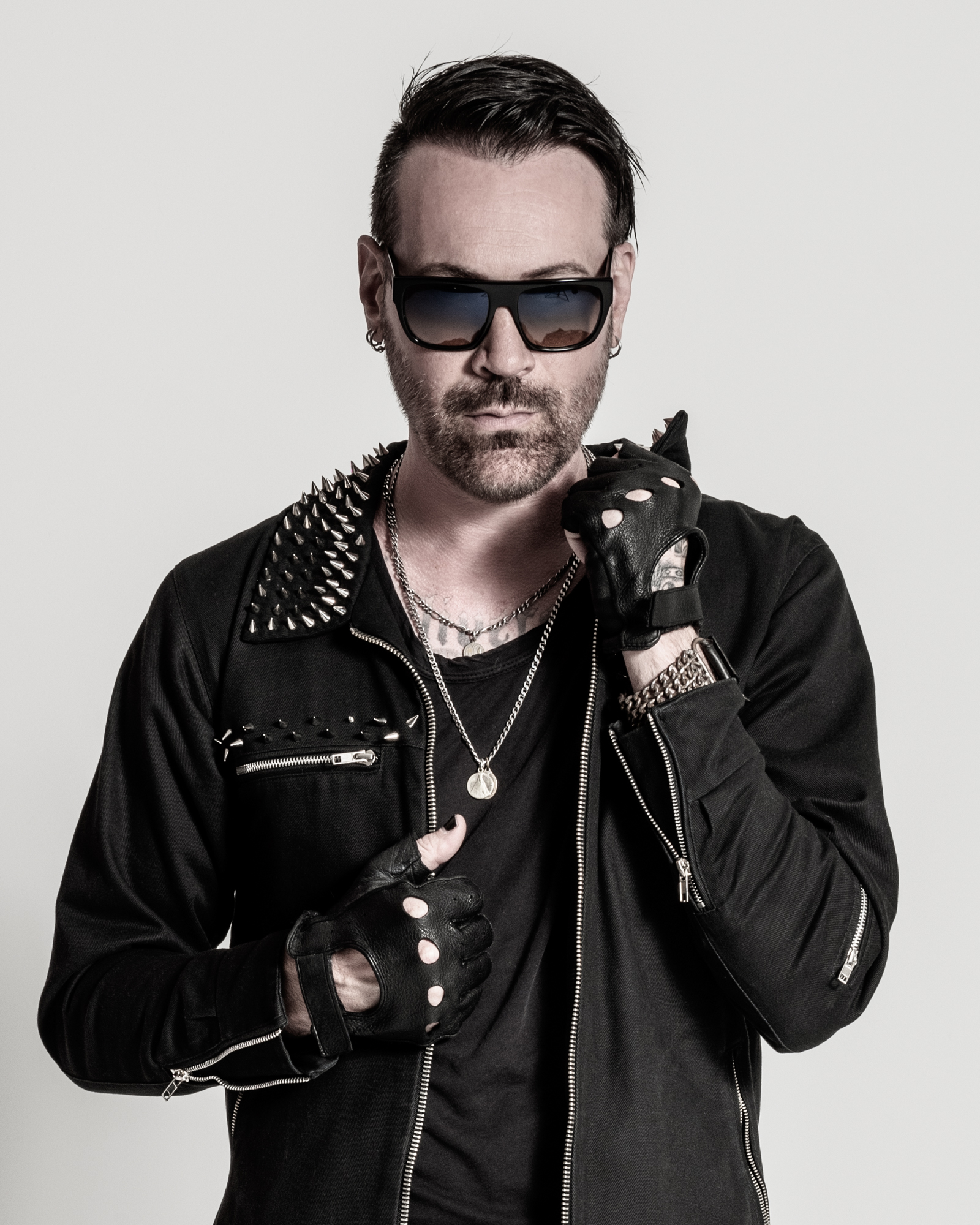
- Shuck in 2019

Background information
- Genres: Electronic rock; alternative rock
- Occupations: Musician; singer; songwriter; entrepreneur
- Instruments: Vocals; synthesizer; guitar
- Years active: 1989–present
- Member of: Julien-K
- Formerly of: Orgy; Dead by Sunrise; Adema; Sexart
- Website: www.julienk.com

Ryan Shuck is an American musician and co-founder of electronic rock bands Orgy and Julien-K. He was the guitarist and backing vocalist of Dead by Sunrise, the alternative rock side project of Linkin Park frontman Chester Bennington. He was also the lead singer of the rock band Adema from 2019 to 2024. Initially in the late 1980s and early 1990s, Shuck played in the Bakersfield-based rock band Sexart alongside future Korn lead singer Jonathan Davis and future Adema bassist Dave DeRoo.

Shuck owns four restaurants in Orange County, California and a recording studio in Long Beach, California.

== Early life ==
From Shuck's earliest years, he had been an artist. As a child, Shuck painted with his grandmother, and then sold his paintings at local art shows where people bought the painting thinking they had been painted by an experienced adult artist.

At an age of 16, Shuck finally discovered music for himself when he first picked up the guitar. He soon moved on to experimenting with keyboards and other electronic instruments and learning that he could sing, while simultaneously listening to strange combinations of music from the likes of Depeche Mode, Metallica, The Cure, Slayer, Run DMC, and Kraftwerk. These odd combinations of music would influence Shuck for years to come. Shuck had stated in later interviews that he always thought they went together beautifully and didn't understand why there were so many lines dividing styles of music.

In order to combine his love for music, design and fashion, Shuck left his hometown Taft at the age of 18 in order to move to Bakersfield and enroll at a Cosmetology school to become a Barber.

== Music career ==
=== Early musical projects ===
After relocating to Bakersfield for his studies, Shuck made a new friend, Jonathan Davis. They both shared their love of fashion, heavy music, and electronic/dance music, so they formed the alternative metal band Sexart, along with Ray "Chaka" Solis on guitar, David DeRoo (Adema) on bass, and Dennis Shinn on drums. On the only released Sexart song, "Inside," they were joined by Ty Elam (Videodrone) on vocals.

Davis left the band in 1993 to join Korn and had major success with songs that were also originally co-written by Shuck ("Blind", "Daddy"). Shuck also eventually left and went on to form the band Orgy.

=== The Orgy era ===
Shuck found his first major mainstream success as a founding member of the Los Angeles band Orgy. The band, which also consisted of the other two founders Jay Gordon (vocals) and Amir Derakh (guitar, g-synth) and also Paige Haley (bass) and Bobby Hewitt (drums), was eventually signed by Korn to their Warner Bros. Records imprint, Elementree Records. Orgy's style was categorized as "Undercore", a synthesis of glam, goth and synth-rock with science fiction. Orgy, who had been lovingly described by some magazines as "The Cure on cocaine," went on to sell over three million records, receive platinum awards, and hit top positions in the Billboard charts, giving Shuck a taste of real music industry success and massive MTV and radio exposure.

They were also featured on several soundtracks for popular movies, such as Not Another Teen Movie, Charlie's Angels, Scream III, and Zoolander.

During the work on the band's third album Punk Statik Paranoia, Shuck and his long-time partner and close friend Amir Derakh began to realize that they clashed with singer Jay Gordon regarding the future direction of the band. While Shuck and Derakh wanted Orgy to pursue a more experimental electro-pop and dance path, Gordon wanted the band to be heavier with more rock influence. That is when Shuck and Derakh began the "Julien-K experiment".

=== Julien-K ===
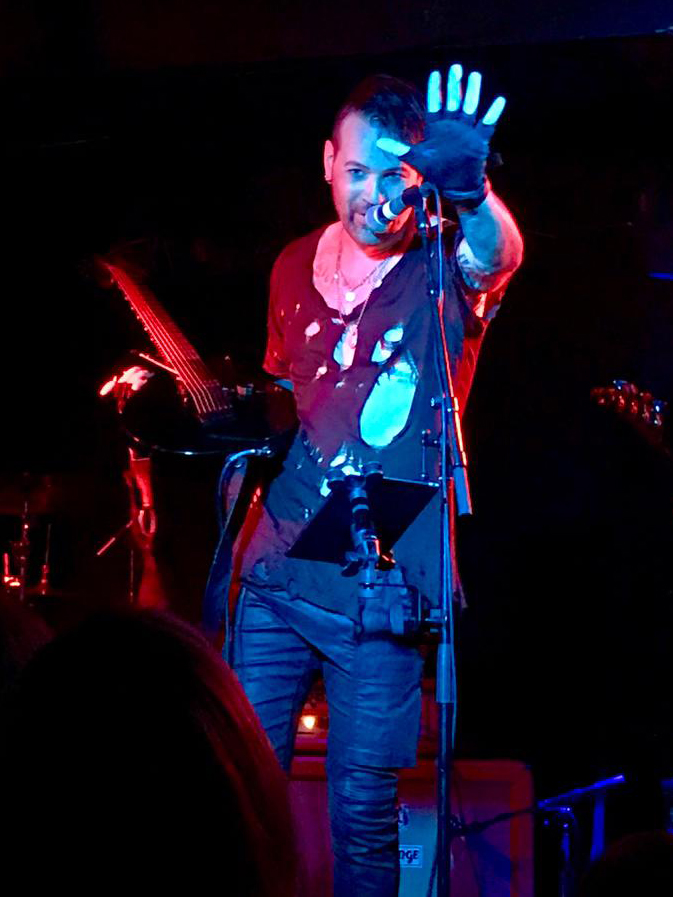
Shuck with Julien-K in 2018

With Julien-K, Shuck finally found the outlet to do the music that he always wanted to do – "passionate electronic music." So far, the band (which, besides Shuck, nowadays consists of Amir Derakh on guitar, Anthony Valcic on synths and bass, and Frank Zummo on drums) has released six albums – Death To Analog (released on March 10, 2009, via Metropolis Records and executive produced by Linkin Park's Chester Bennington) and We're Here With You (released on January 23, 2012, via Julien-K INC). Death To Analog made it to the top 10 of the Billboard Dance/Electronic album charts and We're Here With You hit #4 in the US iTunes charts – both in the first week of release.

In the early days of the band, Julien-K also recorded two tracks for the video games Sonic Heroes and Shadow the Hedgehog (Video Game): "This Machine" and "Waking Up", respectively. Their song "Technical Difficulties" was also featured on the official soundtrack of the movie Transformers, and they were featured on the Underworld: Evolution soundtrack with a remix for the song "Morning After," on which they collaborated with Chester Bennington from Linkin Park. Besides, they were responsible for the whole film score of the video game Transformers: Revenge of the Fallen and to date their songs were remixed by several well-known DJs such as deadmau5, Benjamin Vial, Bryan Black of Motor, and Z-Listers.

In 2012, Julien-K did the score for the comedy movie Matt's Chance (directed by Nicholas Gyeney). Their compositions recently won the award for "Best Score" at the Bloody Hero International Film Festival.

Up until now, the band has also been touring all over the United States and Europe with big names such as Linkin Park, My Chemical Romance, HIM, Evanescence, Papa Roach, The Sounds, and Filter. They started touring in 2007 before even having an album out and with no press kit and no media push.

=== Dead by Sunrise ===
Apart from their own musical endeavors, Shuck and the other band members of Julien-K had also been working alongside Linkin Park co-frontman Chester Bennington on his solo project Dead by Sunrise, which he had been working on since 2005. Their debut album Out of Ashes was released on October 13, 2009, and hit the top 30 in the Billboard 200 album charts and the top 10 in the Billboard Modern Rock charts.

Several tours and performances around the globe followed the release – the highlight having been an appearance at the Summer Sonic Festival in Japan and in an interview in 2012 it was revealed that there are plans to continue the project in the near future.

=== Other musical appearances ===
Besides playing in his actual bands, Shuck also contributed guitar parts to the all-star project The Wondergirls which featured Stone Temple Pilots frontman Scott Weiland, Mark McGrath of Sugar Ray, Ian Astbury of The Cult, Shannon Leto of Thirty Seconds to Mars, Doug Ardito of Puddle of Mudd, Ken Andrews of Failure, Martyn LeNoble of Porno for Pyros, and Troy Van Leeuwen of Queens of the Stone Age.

He was also a member of the fun project of Chester Bennington called Bucket Of Weenies which only had a handful live performances, e.g. at the Club Tattoo Anniversary Party in 2005 and 2006.

Shuck also played guitar on the Hypno-Submissive Remix for the Coal Chamber song "Sway" and in the song "Kerosene" by nu metal band Drown.

Besides, he contributed guest vocals to a remix of Mindless Self Indulgence's song "What Do They Know?", to some songs by Amir Derakh's tech house project Circuit Freq, to Vandal's song "Fail With Grace", to an EP of electronic project Virgin Tears, and to some songs of the newcomer act Decode Radio whose debut EP The Death Rattle (released via Circuit Freq Records) he also produced in his own studio.

On October 27, 2017, he performed One Step Closer with Jonathan Davis at Linkin Park and Friends – Celebrate Life in Honor of Chester Bennington.

=== Adema ===
In 2019, Ryan joined nu-metal band Adema as their lead singer.

On February 27, 2024, Adema announced they have parted ways with Ryan to “continue on indefinitely as a four-piece”.

=== Endorsements ===
Ever since his playing in Orgy, Shuck has been endorsed by Yamaha Guitars and helped create his own signature 7-string guitar model called AES RS-7.

With Julien-K, he is currently endorsed by Orange Amps and König & Meyer microphone and keyboard stands. In the past, Julien-K collaborated with designer Jeffrey Sebelia (known as the winner of the third season of the reality show Project Runway) and his Cosa Nostra clothing line in order to create individual outfits.

== Musical style and influence ==
Shuck's first musical influences were heavy metal bands such as Metallica and Slayer, until he discovered electronic music at an age of 14 or 15 when he first saw music videos from the new wave genre at a dance club in San Luis Obispo. This key experience really changed his life and made him turn away from heavy metal to more electronic music. With his first project Sexart, Shuck also had a great impact on the development of the genre nowadays known as "nu metal". The band also laid the foundation for several successful musical careers.

Being a member of Orgy, Shuck was able to define a completely new genre called "death-pop" while playing a very synth-oriented sound that one had never heard before, by means of using instruments and effects that had never been used in music before.

Shuck's current project Julien-K also has a high focus on visual aspects, fashion, design, and presenting a certain lifestyle. The band always tries to include its sense for aesthetics into their music and into an extraordinary stage setting that makes them stand out from their contemporaries.

== Non-musical activities ==
=== Acting ===
In 2001, Shuck had a small role as the character Pride in the horror movie The Forsaken.

As a member of Orgy, he also played himself during the episode "Sin Francisco" of the popular fantasy series Charmed wherein the band performed their song "Opticon" live.

=== Modeling ===
In the Orgy days, Shuck did some modeling for Calvin Klein Jeans.

Afterwards, he also modeled for the clothing lines Howe and Ve'cel.

=== Business activities ===
Apart from his musical endeavors, Shuck is an entrepreneur who currently owns four restaurants in Orange County, CA – The Gypsy Den in Costa Mesa, Santa Ana, and Anaheim, and the Lola Gaspar in Santa Ana. The Gypsy Den chain has been getting rave reviews by renowned local magazines such as OC Weekly and was recently awarded with the "Certificate of Appreciation" by the Children's Bureau for its generous contributions. Shuck is currently in the process of opening two new restaurant concepts in Costa Mesa (PBLC TRDE) and Long Beach (Daily Communal).

Shuck also owns a recording studio in Long Beach where he not only produces material for his own musical projects but also for artists such as Decode Radio and Battle Tapes. He is also heavily involved in the business activities of the band's own company called Julien-K INC. and in the business side of Derakh's and Valcic's independent record label Circuit Freq Records.

At the beginning of the 21st century, Shuck was involved in the setup of the technology and media company Level 7 LLC, alongside Broadcom co-founder Henry Nicholas. Legal issues prevented the release of Julien-K's debut album Death to Analog through Level 7. Before that, Shuck had also successfully launched his own fashion line called Replicant Clothing, alongside Head (Korn), with strong support by artists such as Chester Bennington and Stephen Carpenter (Deftones). This experience also led Shuck to have a great impact on the creation of Chester Bennington's clothing line Ve'cel in 2006.
