= Dead by Sunrise =

American rock band

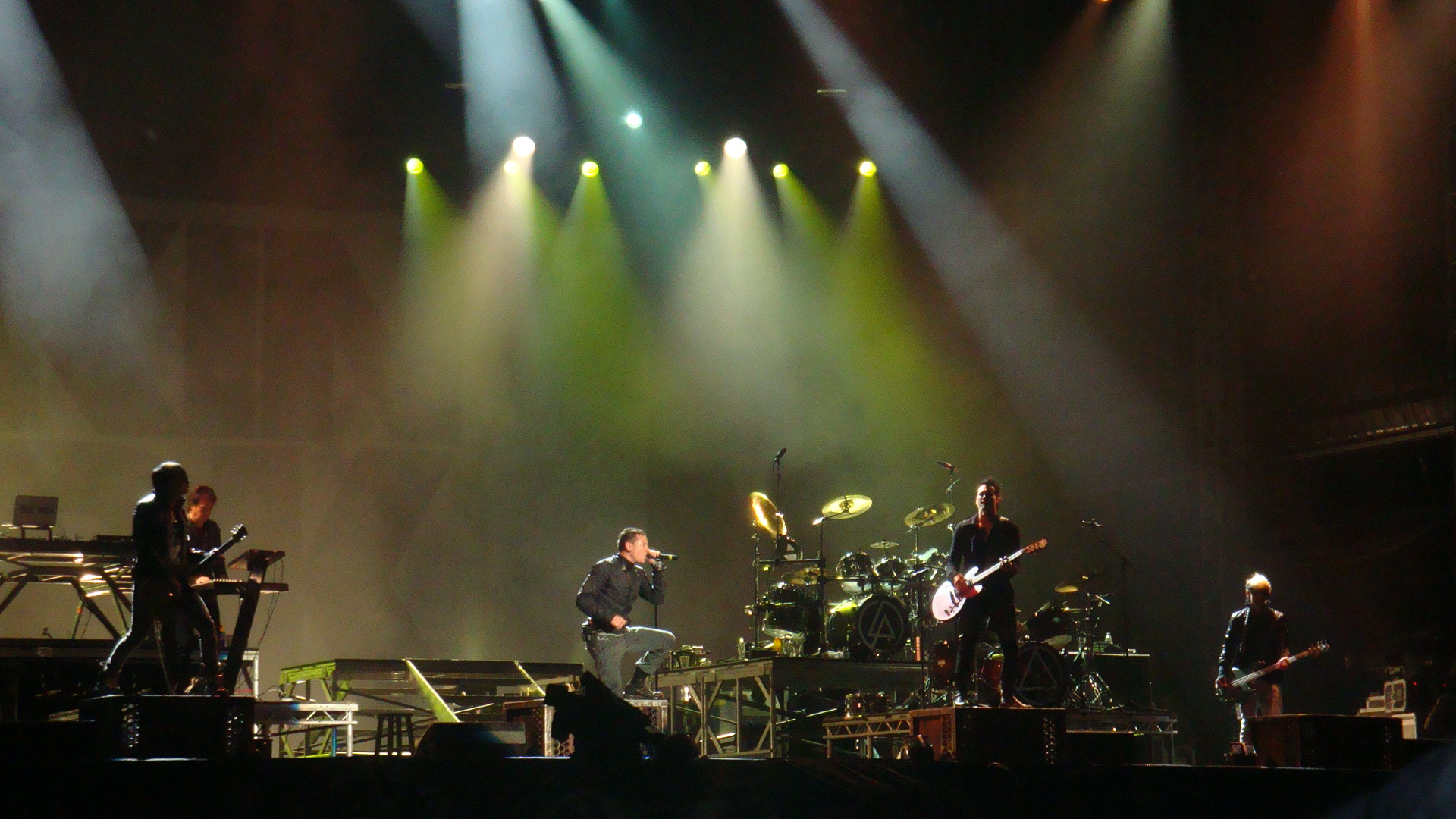
- Dead by Sunrise performing at Sonisphere Festival UK as part of the Linkin Park encore in 2009

Background information
- Origin: Los Angeles, California, U.S.
- Genres: Alternative rock; electronic rock; alternative metal
- Years active: 2005–2012; 2017
- Label: Warner Bros.
- Spinoff of: Linkin Park; Julien-K; Orgy; Street Drum Corps
- Past members: Chester Bennington; Amir Derakh; Ryan Shuck; Elias Andra; Brandon Belsky; Anthony Valcic; Frank Zummo

Dead by Sunrise (formerly known as Snow White Tan) was an American rock supergroup formed in Los Angeles, California in 2005 by vocalist Chester Bennington. The band also consisted of Amir Derakh, Ryan Shuck, Brandon Belsky, Elias Andra, and Anthony "Fu" Valcic from Julien-K and Orgy. Dead by Sunrise's debut studio album, Out of Ashes, was released worldwide on October 13, 2009.

== History ==
=== Out of Ashes (2005–2009) ===
Dead By Sunrise formed in 2005 during Linkin Park's break after the Meteora album cycle ended in September of 2004. According to Bennington, "I came up with a few songs that felt and sounded really good, but I knew they weren't right stylistically for Linkin Park. They were darker and moodier than anything I'd come up with for the band. So I decided to work on them on my own rather than turn them over and have them transformed into Linkin Park tracks." However, the foundation for Dead By Sunrise was laid much earlier, when future bandmate Shuck met Bennington during the recording of Linkin Park's first album Hybrid Theory. In an interview, Shuck states that "I always used to go to his house and hear him play acoustic guitar. And I always thought to myself, 'Oh my God, these are such good songs.'" Bennington performed Morning After, for example, acoustically at a few Linkin Park shows in 2001. According to Bennington's wife at the time, Bennington would always play Morning After and Jane Says, another song that Chester performed acoustically at Linkin Park shows in 2001, during house parties.

The band's name, which was previously "Snow White Tan", reflects the time during the album's recording because according to Bennington, he never saw the sun and that he felt like a vampire due to his lifestyle at the time. The band ended up changing the name to Dead By Sunrise. In an interview, Bennington stated that:

I came up with the band name because in the beginnings of making this album, I was partying ... we'll call it partying. It wasn't much fun, but we partied a lot. And there was a lot of times where I was kind of in a really self-destructive place, and sometimes it felt like you weren't sure if you were going to make it to the next day. The name kind of evolved from that lifestyle, and the title of the record, Out of Ashes, is kind of coming out of that self-destructive path I was on, and rising from the ashes, so to speak.

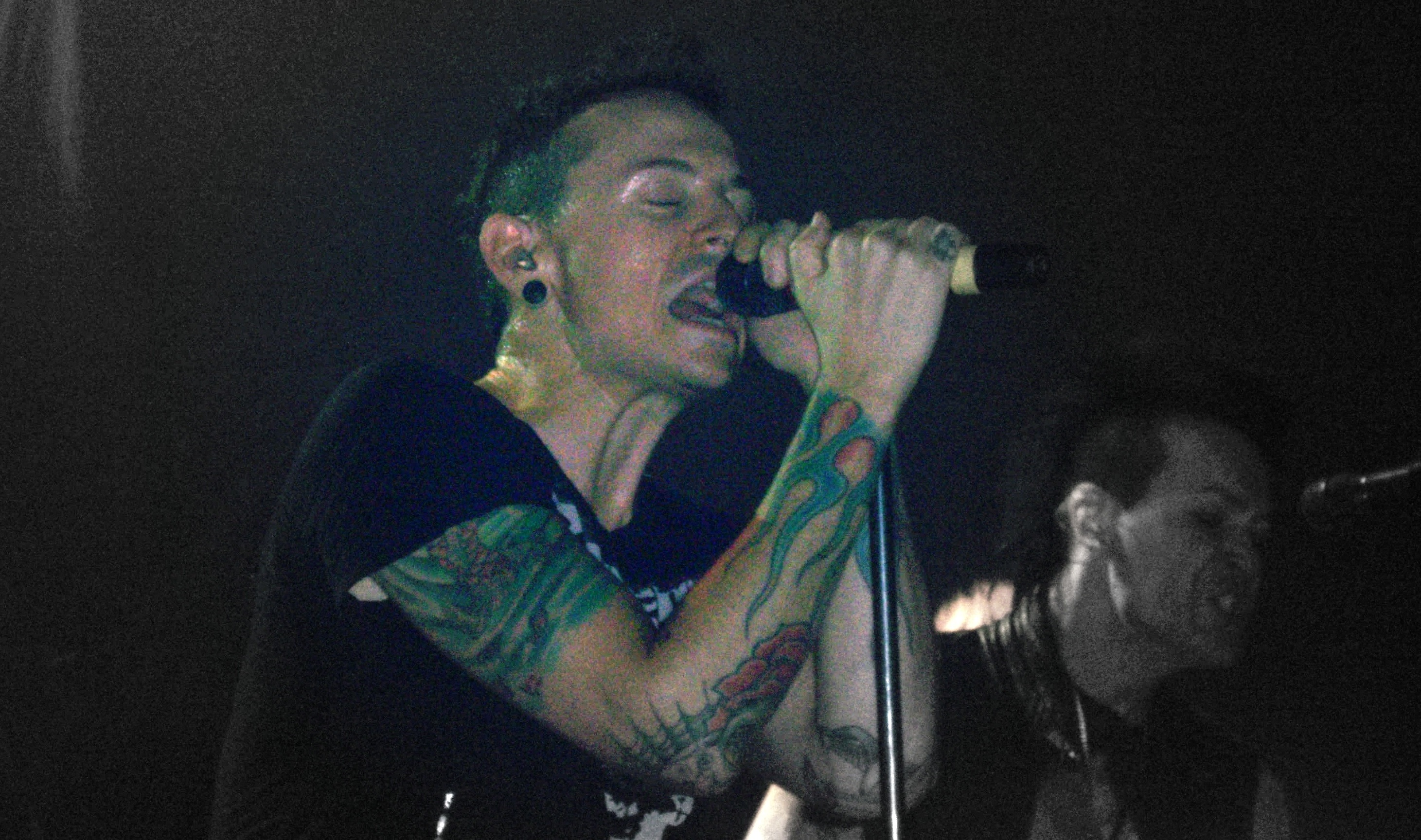
Dead by Sunrise performing in 2009

On September 10th, 2005, Snow White Tan performed Let Down acoustically on national television for ReAct Now, a benefit concert series for Hurricane Katrina relief. The band also planned on performing at the Taste The Music Festival in Arizona in November of 2005 and were going to perform 3 songs acoustically, however the band ended up cancelling their performance. Amir Derakh said at the time that it wasn't their choice to cancel. The album was finished by December of 2005, but Bennington decided not to release it at that time because he was starting to work on what would become Minutes To Midnight with Linkin Park. That process ended up taking all of 2006 and some of 2007 to write the album, and then release and tour for the album, which took place in 2007-2008. On May 10, 2008, Dead by Sunrise performed three songs ("Walking in Circles", "Morning After", and "My Suffering") at the 13th anniversary party for Club Tattoo in Tempe, Arizona. Bennington also performed Morning After with his cover band entitled Bucket Of Weenies in many shows throughout 2005 and 2006. This was the first time that Bennington had "officially" performed the song under a new name—Dead by Sunrise. In addition, this band toured with Linkin Park in Europe, Japan, and America. In an interview with MTV, Bennington stated that "we're actually going to be jumping in the middle of Linkin Park's set, playing a few songs, then jumping out and letting LP finish out the set." During their debut European tour the band took time out to send a message to the German Armed Forces.

Recording of the band's debut album began in October of 2008 after the album cycle for Linkin Park's Minutes To Midnight was finished The band wrote a couple of new songs during this time, Inside Of Me, Condemned and also re-wrote already existing songs Fire and My Suffering. It's unknown if more songs were written during this time period or if the band changed any other existing songs By late December of 2008, the album was done and ready to be recorded. Recording took place starting in January 2009. Working simultaneously on his solo album and Linkin Park's next record, Bennington recorded Out of Ashes with producer Howard Benson and bandmates from Julien-K. Bennington wrote most of the songs on an acoustic guitar before working with his band to reshape the track into hard rock, a ballad, or even removing all rock influence and creating a synth-driven track. Linkin Park bandmate Mike Shinoda confirmed that Out of Ashes is "much more of a rock album [than Linkin Park's albums]." Also of note, Bennington participated in all aspects of creating the record, including programming and production. Out of Ashes was described as grunge, pop rock, and punk rock by critics.

Videos were filmed for "Crawl Back In" (September 8, 2009) and "Let Down" with the songs serving as the album's first two singles. "Crawl Back In" reached the 11th spot on the Mainstream Rock chart.

=== Later career, hiatus, and death of Chester Bennington (2010–2018) ===
In a 2009 interview with Billboard, Bennington said that "This isn't a one-time thing for us. Every five years or so I could imagine there'd be a Dead By Sunrise record." Despite this, in 2010, he stated there was a small chance a new album may be created. The frontman also noted that because of Linkin Park's new direction "it becomes very difficult to choose where the songs that he writes will go."

Brandon Belsky left the band during the summer of 2010. He had left Julien-K at that time because of creative differences. On April 20, 2011, during a Love and Death concert played at an event by The Whosoevers, Elias Andra announced that in December 2010, he had left the band. Later that year the band replaced Andra Eli James briefly, and then with Frank Zummo from Street Drum Corps. The band had been inactive since this time.

On November 4, 2011, Bennington's wife, Talinda, revealed that Dead by Sunrise will perform at the 2011 Stars of the Season Gala event, which focused on raising donations for pediatric rehabilitation. The performance ended up being an acoustic show consisting of Chester, Ryan, Amir and Fu and was the final show that the band ever performed together.

On July 20, 2017, lead vocalist Chester Bennington died by suicide in his home in California. The band made an official statement on their Facebook page on July 29. Band members Ryan Shuck and Amir Derakh along with Grey Daze member Mace Beyers were united to perform a tribute for Bennington in an acoustic concert on September 2 in Las Vegas.

They later took part in Linkin Park's memorial concert for Chester Bennington on October 27, 2017. They performed "One Step Closer" alongside Korn vocalist Jonathan Davis.

In September 2018, Julien-K performed the One More Light 2 memorial in Milan, Italy to honor Chester Bennington with a massive number of Italian fans. They performed as Julien-K and ended the set as Dead By Sunrise along with Italian guest singers.

In 2024, Dead By Sunrise released a deluxe edition of Out Of Ashes on vinyl and later digitally. This deluxe edition contained the acoustic show that the band performed in Las Vegas, NV on July 4th, 2009. In a 2024 interview with Linkin Park fansite Linkin Park Live, Ryan and Amir stated that they would someday be releasing demos and early versions of songs.

== Members ==
- Chester Bennington – lead vocals (2005–2012; died 2017)
- Amir Derakh – lead guitar (2005–2012; 2017)
- Ryan Shuck – rhythm guitar, backing vocals (2005–2012; 2017)
- Elias Andra – drums, percussion (2009–2011)
- Brandon Belsky – bass (2009–2012)
- Anthony "Fu" Valcic – keyboards, synthesizers (2009–2012)
- Frank Zummo – drums (2012)

== Discography ==
=== Albums ===
==== Studio albums ====
List of studio albums, with selected chart positions
Title	Album details	Peak chart positions									
Title	Album details	US	US Alt.	US Rock	AUT	FRA	GER	JPN	NLD	SWI	UK
Out of Ashes	Released: October 13, 2009; Label: Warner Bros.; Formats: CD, digital download	29	9	5	11	109	5	16	82	18	74

=== Singles ===
List of singles, with selected chart positions, showing year released and album name
Title	Year	Peak chart positions						Album
Title	Year	US Adult	US Alt.	US Main. Rock	US Rock	GER	JPN Hot	Album
"Crawl Back In"	2009	—	23	11	22	66	—	Out of Ashes
"Let Down"	2009	—	—	—	—	—	—	Out of Ashes
"Fire"	2009	—	—	—	—	—	47	Out of Ashes
"—" denotes a recording that did not chart or was not released in that territory.

==== Promotional singles ====
List of charted songs, showing year they have charted and album name
Title	Year	Peak chart positions		Album
Title	Year	US Adult	US Main. Rock	Album
"My Suffering"	2009	—	—	Out of Ashes
"Inside of Me"	2010	—	40	Out of Ashes
"Too Late"	2010	39	—	Out of Ashes

=== Music videos ===
List of music videos, showing year released and director
Title	Year	Director(s)
"Crawl Back In"	2009	P. R. Brown
"Let Down" (Live)	2009	—N/a
"Let Down"	2009	P. R. Brown
"Fire"	2010	—N/a
