= Amir Derakh =

American musician and record producer

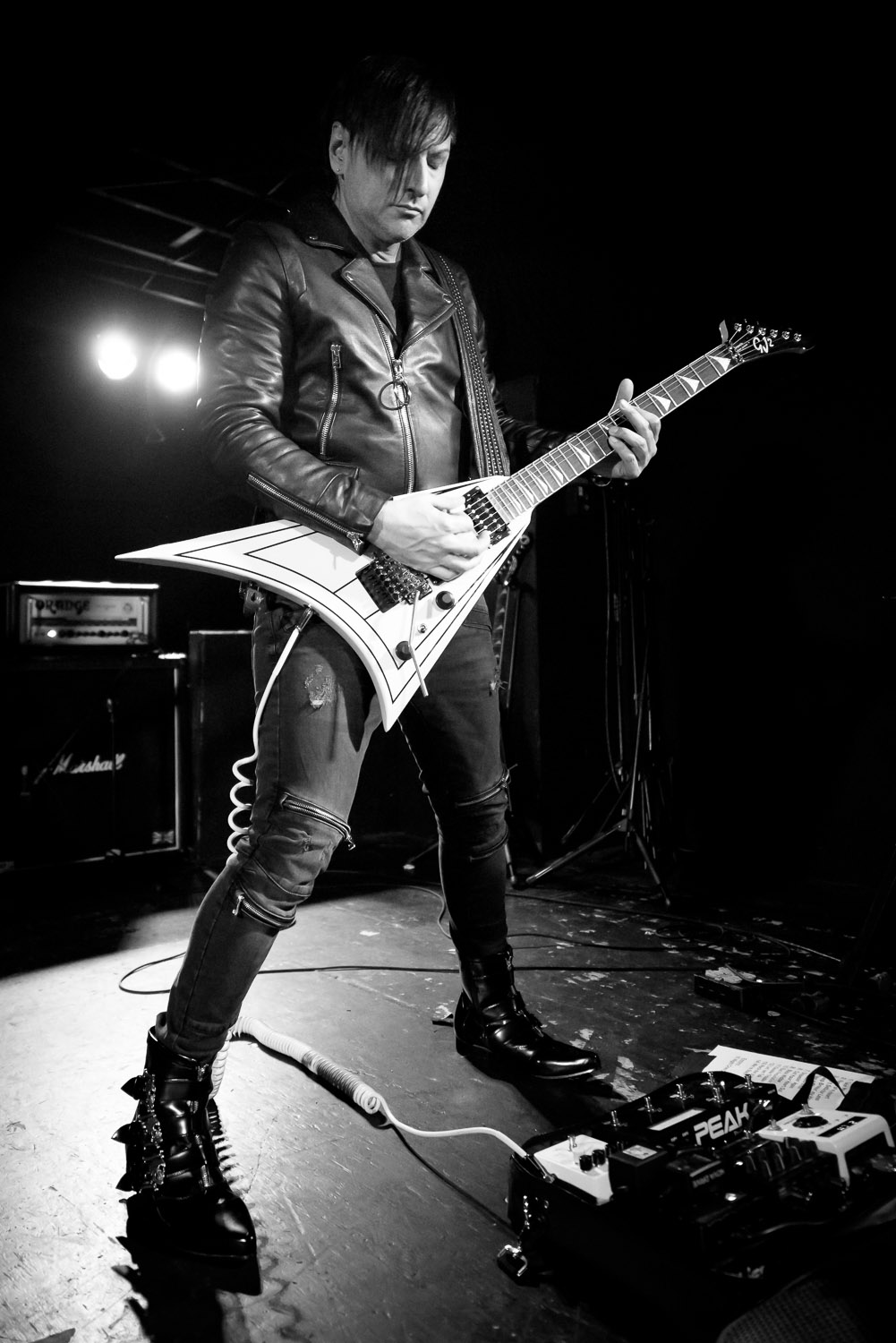
- Derakh performing in 2017

Background information
- Born: Amir Davidson
- Genres: Alternative rock; electronic rock; industrial metal; indietronica; noise; darkwave; dance; nu metal; heavy metal; industrial; gothic rock; electronica; dark pop; post-punk; glam metal
- Occupations: Musician; producer
- Instruments: Guitar; synthesizer; programming
- Years active: 1980–present

Amir Davidson, professionally known as Amir Derakh, is an American musician and record producer. He is the guitarist and the synthesizer player for the band Julien-K, and was the guitarist for the band Dead by Sunrise. He was the g-synth player in the rock band Orgy, and has also played guitar in the bands Rough Cutt and Jailhouse.

== Career ==
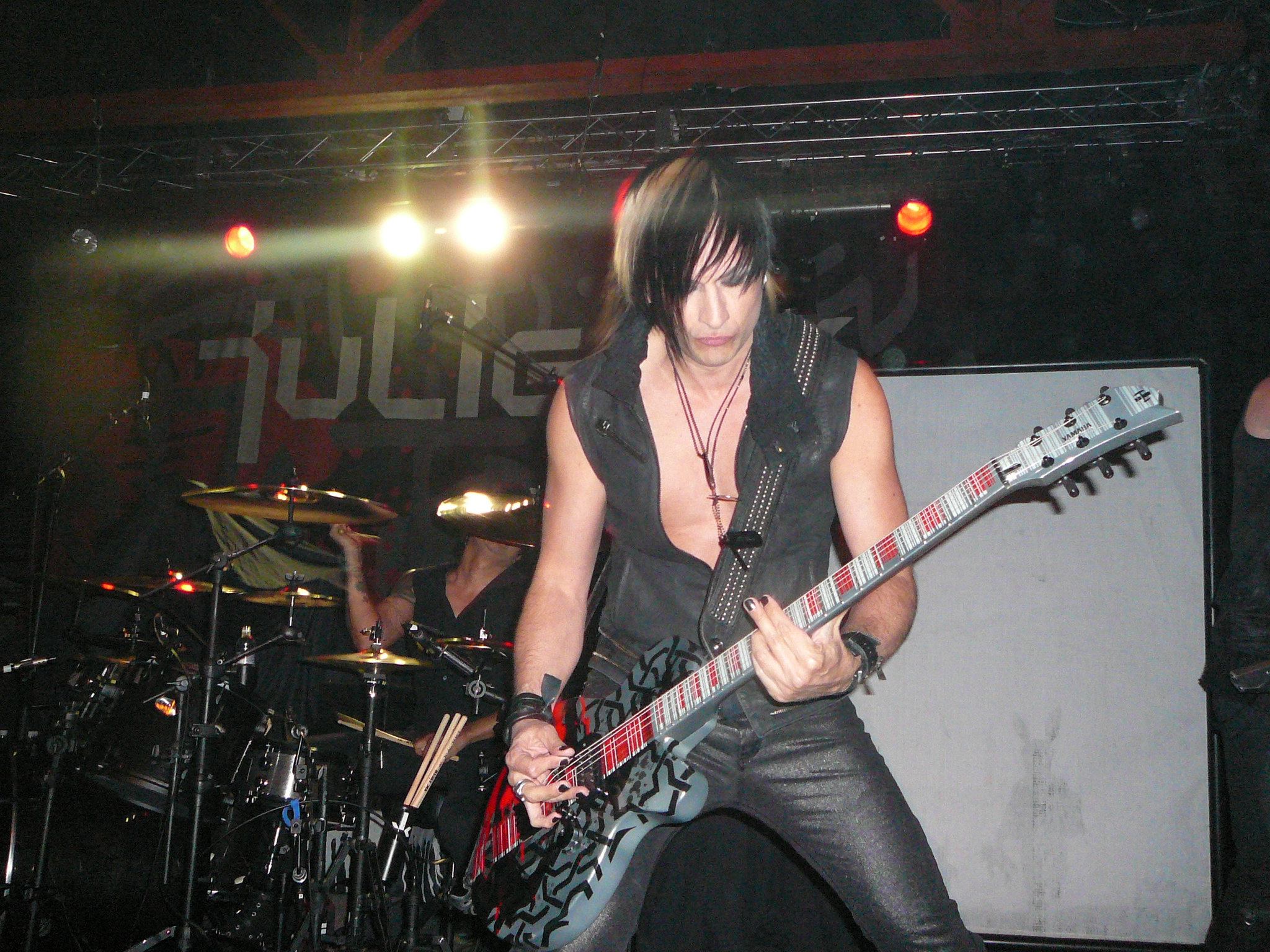
Derakh with Julien-K in 2008

After graduating in 1981 from Mission Bay High School in San Diego, California, Derakh played lead guitar for local bands Armed & Ready and Emerald. He moved to Los Angeles to replace Craig Goldy in Rough Cutt. He made a guest appearance on Crazy Town's album The Gift of Game. Julien-K released a remix of Linkin Park lead singer Chester Bennington's solo song "Morning After" which appeared exclusively on the soundtrack for the 2006 film Underworld: Evolution. Derakh describes the sound of Julien-K as Depeche Mode meets Nine Inch Nails.

Derakh performed backing for Bennington when he performed the song "Let Down" during 2005's ReAct Now: Music & Relief televised concert. He also made an appearance in the 2003 version of the film Freaky Friday, also serving as the film's guitar consultant and has worked with many other popular bands, including Coal Chamber, Spineshank, Danzig, Eels, Red Tape, Mumiy Troll and Estados Alterados.

Derakh owns two restaurants in Orange County, California, 2145 & Lola Gaspar, and a recording and mixing studio in Long Beach, California.

== Personal life ==
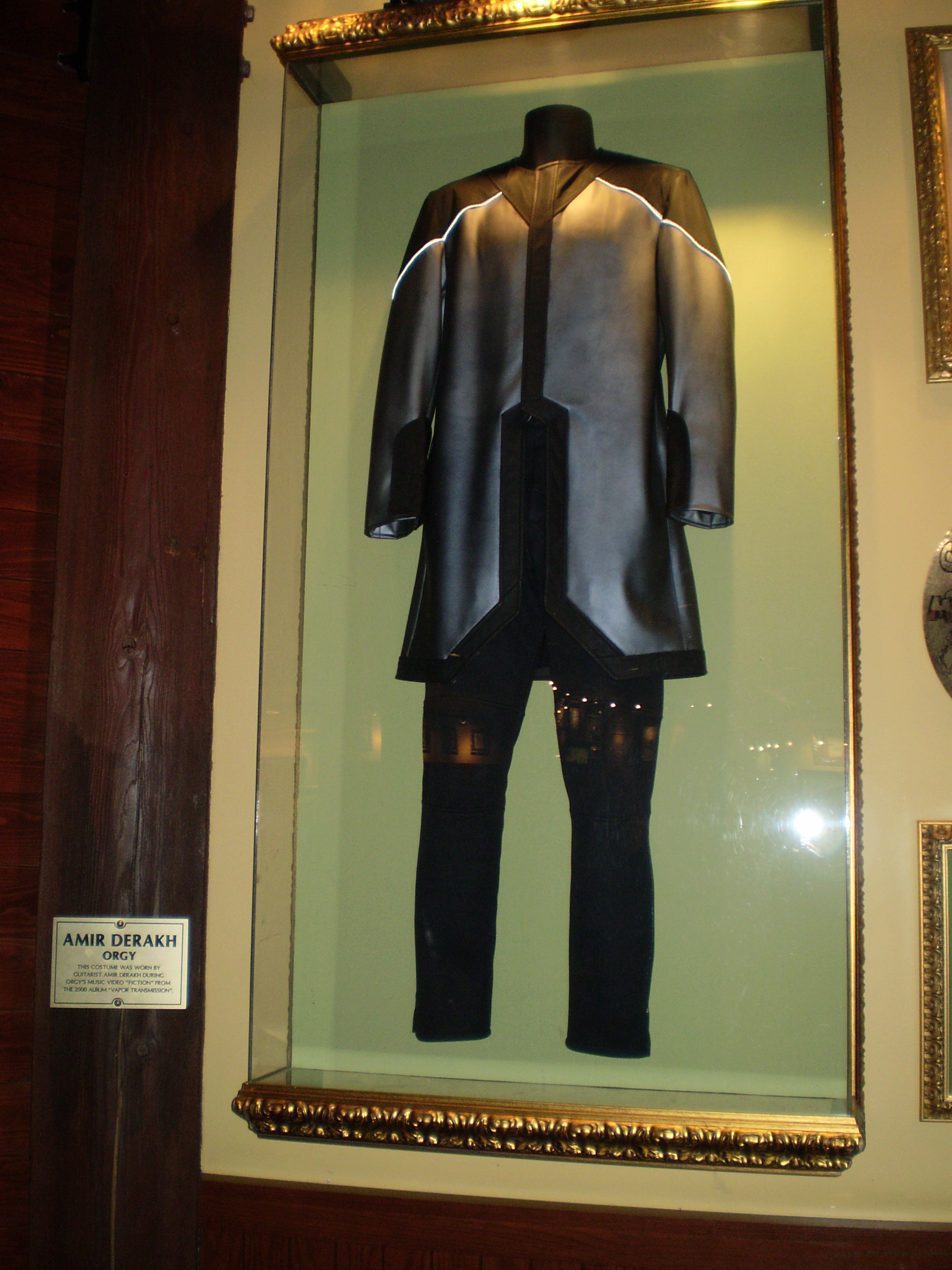
Amir Derakh's "Fiction" video outfit at the Hard Rock Cafe in San Francisco, California

Derakh is of Iranian, Irish, Austrian, Hungarian and Czechoslovak ancestry. He attended UCLA and earned his certificate in producing/engineering.

According to Metal Sludge, his stage name is a phonetic play on the phrase "I'm here to rock", with the spelling of the last name as a tribute to his Iranian heritage.

Derakh has a son named Michael Melody-Davidson.

== Discography ==
- "Slaves to Humanity" – Battleground, "Behind My Back", "Riot Addict", "I Love It" – producer/engineer/mixer – 2020
- "The Intemperate Sons" – Running Man, "Believe", "Wading in the Gray", "Going Crazy", "Remission" – mixer – 2020
- "Ghostfeeder" – Invited to the Murder – mixer – 2020
- "Hospital Lies" – Ultraviolet – mixer – 2020
- Julien-K – Harmonic Disruptor – producer/engineer/mixer – 2019
- "By An Ion" – Shadow Knife, "Faces" – mixer – 2019
- "Ghostfeeder" – Star Beast – mixer/addl. production – 2018
- "Estados Alterados" – Lumisphera – producer/engineer/mixer – 2018
- Julien-K – Time Capsule – A Future Retrospective – producer/engineer/mixer – 2018
- "Grey Saints" – Steam Catcher", "Crash – producer / engineer / mixer – 2017
- "Lovelesslust" – Fashion – producer/engineer/mixer – 2017
- Julien-K – California Noir, Chapter Two – Nightlife In Neon – producer/engineer/mixer – 2016
- "Fourwaycross" – Discipline – mixer – 2016
- Beta Test – Movie Score/Soundtrack – 2016
- "Lovelesslust" – The Car Crash That Ended Her Life Came as No Surprise – mixer – 2016
- Mumiy Troll – Malibu Alibi – co-producer/engineer/mixer – various tracks – 2016
- Julien-K – California Noir, Chapter One – Analog Beaches & Digital Cities – producer/engineer/mixer – 2015
- Mumiy Troll – Pirate Copies – co-producer/engineer/mixer – various tracks – 2015 - #1 Russian Album
- "The Crying Spell" – Never Again – mixer – 2015
- "Matt's Chance" – Movie Score/Soundtrack – 2014
- Mumiy Troll – SOS Matrosu – co-producer/engineer/mixer/remixer – various tracks – 2013 - #1 Russian Album
- Julien-K – We're Here With You – producer/engineer – 2012
- Sonic Generations Original Soundtrack: Blue Blur – Soundtrack – producer/engineer/mixer for Circuit Freq – Sega – 2011
- True Colors: The Best of Sonic the Hedgehog Part 2 – Soundtrack – producer/engineer/mixer for Julien-K – Sega – 2009
- Dead by Sunrise – Out of Ashes – pre-production and engineering – Warner Bros. - 2009
- Transformers: Revenge of the Fallen (video game) – producer/engineer/mixer for Julien-K score – Activision – 2009
- Julien-K – Death to Analog – producer/engineer/mixer – 2009
- Transformers – soundtrack – producer/engineer for Julien-K – Warner Bros. - 2007
- Underworld: Evolution – soundtrack – producer/engineer/mixer for Chester Bennington vs. Julien-K – Sony – 2007
- Shadow the Hedgehog – soundtrack – producer/engineer/mixer for Julien-K – Sega – 2005
- Orgy – Punk Statik Paranoia – co-producer/engineer/mixer – D1 – 2004
- Red Tape – Radioactivist – producer/mixer – roadrunner – 2004
- Sonic Heroes – Soundtrack – producer/engineer/mixer for Julien-K – Sega – 2004
- Freaky Friday – Soundtrack – producer/engineer for Halo Friendlies – Hollywood – 2003 – Gold
- Coal Chamber- Giving the Devil His Due – engineer/mixer – Roadrunner -2003
- Coal Chamber – Dark Days – pre-production & song arrangements – Roadrunner – 2002
- Valentine – pre-production & engineering – Warner Bros. - 2001
- Zoolander – Soundtrack – co-producer/engineer/mixer for Orgy – Hollywood – 2001
- Spineshank – The Height of Callousness – pre-production & song arrangements – Roadrunner – 2000 – Grammy Award Nominated
- Scream 3 – Soundtrack – remixer for Orgy – Wind-Up – 2000 – Gold
- Orgy – Vapor Transmission – co-producer/engineer – Reprise – 2000 – Gold
- Danzig – Satan's Child – mixer – E-Magine – 1999
- Coal Chamber – Chamber Music – mixer – Roadrunner – 1999
- Spineshank – Strictly Diesel – producer/engineer/mixer – Roadrunner – 1998
- Orgy – Candyass – co-producer/engineer – Reprise – 1998 – Platinum
- Strangeland – soundtrack – mixer for Coal Chamber – TVT – 1998
- Bride of Chucky – soundtrack – mixer for Coal Chamber – CMC – 1998
- Rod Stewart tribute album – Forever Mod – Portrait of a Storyteller – producer/engineer/mixer/arranger – DeRock – 1997
- Coal Chamber – Coal Chamber – engineer/mixer – Roadrunner – 1997 – Gold
- Eels – Beautiful Freak – engineer – DreamWorks – 1996 – Gold – Grammy Award Nominated
