= Vera Farmiga on screen and stage =

American actress

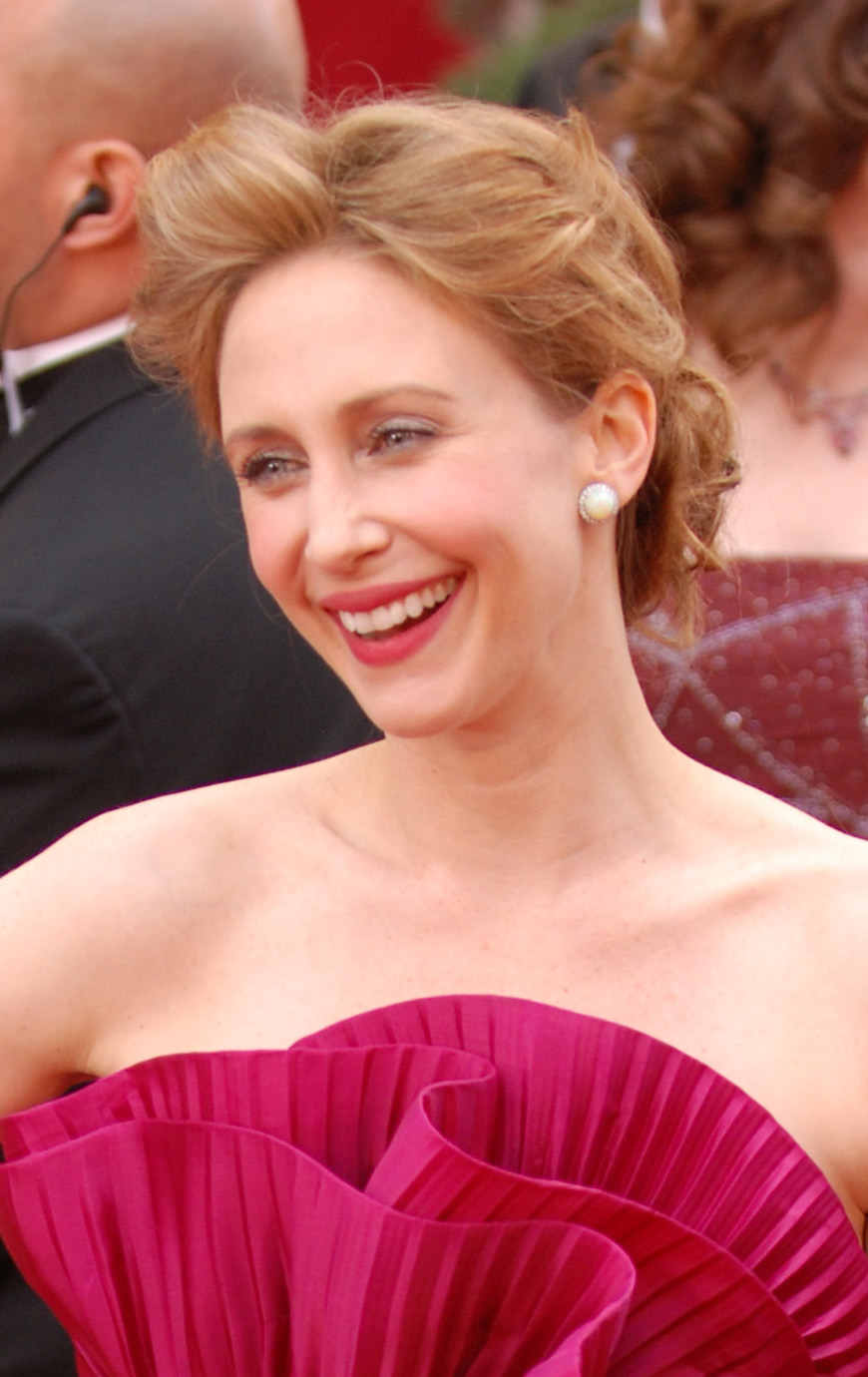
Farmiga at the 82nd Academy Awards on March 7, 2010

Vera Farmiga is an American actress. She began her career on stage as an understudy in Ronald Harwood's 1996 play Taking Sides on Broadway. The following year, she starred in the Off-Broadway play Second-Hand Smoke (1997) by Mac Wellman. Farmiga made her film debut in the drama-thriller Return to Paradise (1998). She then had supporting roles in the romantic drama film Autumn in New York (2000), the crime drama film The Opportunists (2000), and the action thriller film 15 Minutes (2001). Farmiga's breakthrough role came in 2004, when she was cast in the drama film Down to the Bone. For her performance, she won the Sundance Film Festival Special Jury Prize for Acting and was nominated for the Independent Spirit Award for Best Female Lead. She then starred in the political thriller The Manchurian Candidate (2004) and the crime thriller Running Scared (2006).

Farmiga's role in The Departed (2006), which won the Academy Award for Best Picture, brought her to worldwide prominence. She subsequently had a lead role in the romantic drama Never Forever (2007). In 2008, Farmiga starred in the historical drama The Boy in the Striped Pyjamas, for which she won the British Independent Film Award for Best Actress. That same year, she appeared in the political drama Nothing But the Truth, for which she was nominated for the Critics' Choice Movie Award for Best Supporting Actress. She then starred in the psychological thriller Orphan (2009), and gained critical acclaim for her role in the comedy-drama Up in the Air (2009), for which she was nominated for the Academy Award for Best Supporting Actress.

In 2011, Farmiga made her directorial debut with the drama Higher Ground, for which she was nominated for the Gotham Award for Best Breakthrough Director and the Satellite Award for Best Actress – Motion Picture. Also in 2011, she starred in the science fiction film Source Code. The following year, she appeared in the action thriller Safe House (2012) and the comedy-drama Goats (2012). In 2014, she starred in the drama The Judge. Two years later, she co-starred in the satirical comedy Special Correspondents (2016). In 2018, she appeared in the action thriller The Commuter and the biographical drama The Front Runner. The following year, Farmiga starred in the science fiction thriller Captive State and the monster blockbuster Godzilla: King of the Monsters. In 2021, she starred as Livia Soprano in the crime drama film The Many Saints of Newark.

In 2013, Farmiga starred as Lorraine Warren in the critically acclaimed horror film The Conjuring, for which she was nominated for the MTV Movie Award for Best Scared-As-Shit Performance; she has reprised her role multiple times in the franchise, including in The Conjuring 2 (2016), Annabelle Comes Home (2019), and The Conjuring: The Devil Made Me Do It (2021).

From 2013 to 2017, she starred in the A&E drama-thriller series Bates Motel as Norma Louise Bates. Her performance in the role earned her the 2013 Saturn Award for Best Actress on Television, and nominations for the Primetime Emmy Award for Outstanding Lead Actress in a Drama Series (2013), the Critics' Choice Television Award for Best Actress in a Drama Series (2013–2015), and the TCA Award for Individual Achievement in Drama (2013). She also served as a producer on the series. In 2019, Farmiga starred in the miniseries When They See Us. For her performance, she received a nomination for the Primetime Emmy Award for Outstanding Supporting Actress in a Limited Series or Movie. Farmiga also portrayed Eleanor Bishop in the Marvel Cinematic Universe superhero miniseries Hawkeye (2021) and Dr. Anna Pou in the medical drama miniseries Five Days at Memorial (2022).

== Film ==
Key
†	Denotes films that have not yet been released

Year	Title	Role	Director	Notes	Ref
1998	Return to Paradise	Kerrie	Joseph Ruben		
2000	The Opportunists	Miriam Kelly	Myles Connell		
2000	Autumn in New York	Lisa Tyler	Joan Chen		
2001	15 Minutes	Daphne Handlova	John Herzfeld		
2001	Dust	Amy	Milcho Manchevski		
2002	Love in the Time of Money	Greta	Peter Mattei		
2002	Dummy	Lorena Fanchetti	Greg Pritikin		
2004	Down to the Bone	Irene Morrison	Debra Granik		
2004	Mind the Gap	Allison Lee	Eric Schaeffer		
2004	The Manchurian Candidate	Jocelyne Jordan	Jonathan Demme		
2005	Neverwas	Eleanna	Joshua Michael Stern		
2006	Running Scared	Teresa Gazelle	Wayne Kramer		
2006	Breaking and Entering	Oana	Anthony Minghella		
2006	The Hard Easy	Dr. Charlie Brooks	Ari Ryan		
2006	The Departed	Dr. Madolyn Madden	Martin Scorsese		
2007	Never Forever	Sophie Lee	Gina Kim	Korean film	
2007	Joshua	Abby Cairn	George Ratliff		
2008	Quid Pro Quo	Fiona Ankany	Carlos Brooks		
2008	In Transit	Dr. Natalia	Tom Roberts		
2008	Nothing But the Truth	Erica Van Doren	Rod Lurie		
2008	The Boy in the Striped Pyjamas	Elsa Hoess	Mark Herman		
2009	Orphan	Kate Coleman	Jaume Collet-Serra		
2009	The Vintner's Luck	Aurora de Valday	Niki Caro		
2009	Up in the Air	Alex Goran	Jason Reitman		
2010	Henry's Crime	Julie Ivanova	Malcolm Venville		
2011	Higher Ground	Corinne Walker	Herself	Directorial debut	
2011	Source Code	Colleen Goodwin	Duncan Jones		
2012	Goats	Wendy Whitman	Christopher Neil		
2012	Safe House	Catherine Linklater	Daniel Espinosa		
2013	At Middleton	Edith Martin	Adam Rodgers		
2013	The Conjuring	Lorraine Warren	James Wan		
2013	Closer to the Moon	Alice Bercovich	Nae Caranfil		
2014	The Judge	Samantha Powell	David Dobkin		
2016	Special Correspondents	Eleanor Finch	Ricky Gervais		
2016	The Conjuring 2	Lorraine Warren	James Wan		
2016	Burn Your Maps	Alise Firth	Jordan Roberts		
2016	The Escape	Dr. Nora Phillips	Neill Blomkamp	Short film	
2017	Unspoken	—N/a	Emma Zurcher-Long, Geneva Peschka, & Julia Ngeow	Documentary; Executive producer	
2018	The Commuter	Joanna	Jaume Collet-Serra		
2018	Boundaries	Laura Jaconi	Shana Feste		
2018	The Front Runner	Oletha "Lee" Hart	Jason Reitman		
2018	Skin	Shareen Krager	Guy Nattiv		
2019	Captive State	Jane Doe	Rupert Wyatt		
2019	Godzilla: King of the Monsters	Dr. Emma Russell	Michael Dougherty		
2019	Annabelle Comes Home	Lorraine Warren	Gary Dauberman		
2021	The Conjuring: The Devil Made Me Do It	Lorraine Warren	Michael Chaves		
2021	The Many Saints of Newark	Livia Soprano	Alan Taylor		
2023	The Nun II	Lorraine Warren	Michael Chaves	Cameo	
2023	Origin	Kate Medina	Ava DuVernay		
2023	Ezra	Grace	Tony Goldwyn		
2025	The Conjuring: Last Rites	Lorraine Warren	Michael Chaves		
2026	The Leader	Bonnie Nettles	Michael Gallagher	Also executive producer	
TBA	Weekend Warriors †	TBA	Stephen Chbosky	Post-production	
TBA	Billion Dollar Spy †	Natasha Tolkachev	Amma Asante	Post-production	

== Television ==
Year	Title	Role	Notes	Ref
1997	Roar	Catlin	13 episodes	
1997	Rose Hill	Emily Elliot	Television film	
1998	Law & Order	Lindsay Carson	Episode: "Expert"	
2001	Snow White: The Fairest of Them All	Queen Josephine	Television film	
2001–2002	UC: Undercover	Alex Cross	13 episodes	
2004	Iron Jawed Angels	Ruza Wenclawska	Television film	
2004	Touching Evil	Detective Susan Branca	12 episodes	
2013–2017	Bates Motel	Norma Louise Bates	50 episodes; Also producer/executive producer; 40 episodes	
2018	Philip K. Dick's Electric Dreams	The Candidate	Episode: "Kill All Others"	
2019	When They See Us	Elizabeth Lederer	2 episodes	
2021	Halston	Adele	Episode: "The Sweet Smell of Success"	
2021	Hawkeye	Eleanor Bishop	6 episodes	
2022	Five Days at Memorial	Dr. Anna Pou	8 episodes	
2025	Boots	Barbara Cope	8 episodes	
TBA	Gossamer †	TBA	Voice; upcoming animated series	

== Stage ==
Year	Title	Role	Location	Notes	Ref
1996	The Tempest	Princess Miranda	American Conservatory Theater		
1996	Good	Anne Hartman	The Barrow Group, Off-Broadway		
1996	Taking Sides	Emmi Straube	Brooks Atkinson Theatre, Broadway	Understudy	
1997	Second-Hand Smoke	Linda	Primary Stages, Off-Broadway		
2002	Under the Blue Sky	Helen	Williamstown Theatre Festival		

== See also ==
- List of awards and nominations received by Vera Farmiga
