= Gina Kim =

Gina Kim may refer to:

- Gina Kim (filmmaker)
- Gina Kim (golfer)
