= George Huang (director) =

American filmmaker

- Born: George Jay Huang; December 1, 1966 (age 59); California, United States
- Education: University of California, Berkeley (BA); University of Southern California (MFA)
- Occupations: Director; producer; screenwriter; educator
- Years active: 1992–present
- Notable work: Swimming with Sharks
- Relatives: Grace Hawthorne (sister)

George Jay Huang is an American film director, writer, producer, and educator. He is best known for writing and directing the 1994 film Swimming with Sharks. In addition to working on his own films, he also contributes work to other independent filmmakers, including Robert Rodríguez.

== Early life and education ==
The son of Taiwanese immigrants, George Huang grew up with an avid love of motion pictures. After high school, he originally enrolled at the University of California, Berkeley, to pursue a degree in business, but during this time he interned at Lucasfilm. After undergrad, he enrolled in a producing program at the University of Southern California.

== Career ==
After graduating from USC, Huang began working from the bottom-up as an executive assistant at Columbia Pictures. In 1992, Columbia acquired the distribution rights to the film El Mariachi by Robert Rodríguez. As the film was being prepared for release, Rodriguez struck up a friendship with the young studio assistant with whom he shared a love of film. Rodriguez, a native and resident of San Antonio, Texas, stayed at Huang's apartment in Los Angeles.

Rodriguez – known for his money-saving and high-quality filmmaking techniques – was amazed by Huang's blasé attitude toward the way his superiors spent millions and millions on the production of a single motion picture. Huang, believing his own original stories would never be told, shared some story ideas with Rodriguez, who promptly told his new friend and roommate that he needed to immediately quit his job and make his own films. Huang was understandably reluctant to this idea, but in January 1993, he resigned from his post at Columbia.

Huang next began writing, and seeking financing for, a script loosely based on his experiences at Columbia. Released in 1994, Huang's debut film, Swimming with Sharks, is a satire of Hollywood politics from the point of view of a studio underling.

Since then, Huang has gone on to do a lot of behind-the-scenes work with directorial turns on several short-lived television series, such as Significant Others, Live Through This, and The Invisible Man. He also directed the independent films Trojan War (starring Jennifer Love Hewitt) and How to Make a Monster (which has become a cult favourite, starring Clea DuVall as the only leading role).

Huang shot Elijah Wood's audition tape that landed him the role of Frodo Baggins in The Lord of the Rings film trilogy.

In 2006, Dimension Films acquired the rights to comic book series Madman, and planned to have a film directed by Huang and produced by Rodriguez and Elizabeth Avellán. Series creator Mike Allred was set to write the screenplay along with Huang. The project ultimately didn't pan out, however, with Allred announcing he had reverted the rights to a Madman film in 2015.

Huang wrote the screenplay for Final Recipe, a 2013 South Korean-Chinese-Thai co-production starring Michelle Yeoh and directed by Gina Kim.

== Filmography ==
=== Film ===
| Year | Title | Director | Writer | Notes |
|---|---|---|---|---|
| 1994 | Swimming with Sharks | Yes | Yes | Also dialogue editor and sound effects editor |
| 1997 | Trojan War | Yes | No | |
| 2001 | How to Make a Monster | Yes | Yes | |
| 2011 | Into the Night | No | Yes | |
| 2013 | Final Recipe | No | Yes | |
| 2016 | Hard Target 2 | No | Yes | |
| 2024 | Weekend in Taipei | Yes | Yes | |

Producer

- S.W.A.T. (2003)

Creative consultant

- Spy Kids 3-D: Game Over (2003)
- Machete (2010)

Co-producer

- Spy Kids: All the Time in the World (2011)
- 22 Willowbrook (2018) (Short film)

=== Television ===
| Year | Title | Director | Writer | Notes |
|---|---|---|---|---|
| 1998 | Significant Others | Yes | No | Episode "My Left Kidney" |
| 2000 | Live Through This | Yes | Yes | |
| 2000 | The Invisible Man | Yes | No | Episode "Germ Theory" |
| 2007 | American Heiress | Yes | No | 27 episodes |
| 2010 | Law & Order: Special Victims Unit | No | Yes | Episode "Gray" |

Creative consultant

- Asian Excellence Awards (2006)

Commercial writer

- Nike: The Black Mamba|Nike: The Black Mamba (2011)
