= Vera Farmiga =

American actress and singer (born 1973)

- Farmiga in 2026
- Born: Vera Ann Farmiga; August 6, 1973 (age 53); Clifton, New Jersey, U.S.
- Education: Syracuse University
- Occupations: Actress; Singer
- Years active: 1996–present (actress); 2024–present (musician)
- Works: Full list
- Spouses: Sebastian Roché (m. 1997; div. 2004) Renn Hawkey (m. 2008)
- Children: 2
- Relatives: Taissa Farmiga (sister); Adriana Farmiga (cousin)
- Awards: Full list
- Musical career
- Genres: Gothic metal; alternative metal; gothic rock; alternative rock
- Instrument: Vocals
- Member of: The Yagas

Vera Ann Farmiga (/fɑːrˈmiːɡə/ far-MEE-gə; born August 6, 1973) is an American actress and singer. She began her professional acting career on stage in the original Broadway production of Taking Sides (1996). After expanding to television and film, her breakthrough came with her starring role as a drug addict in the drama Down to the Bone (2004). She then had roles in the political thriller The Manchurian Candidate (2004), the crime drama The Departed (2006), and the historical drama The Boy in the Striped Pyjamas (2008). She was also established as a scream queen for her performances in the horror films Joshua (2007) and Orphan (2009).

For her performance in the comedy-drama Up in the Air (2009), Farmiga was nominated for an Academy Award and other accolades. She then made her directorial debut with the drama film Higher Ground (2011), in which she had the leading role. She starred in the thrillers Source Code (2011) and Safe House (2012), before furthering her scream queen status by portraying paranormal investigator Lorraine Warren in the Conjuring Universe films The Conjuring (2013), The Conjuring 2 (2016), Annabelle Comes Home (2019), The Conjuring: The Devil Made Me Do It (2021), and The Conjuring: Last Rites (2025). She also starred in the legal drama The Judge (2014), the biographical drama The Front Runner (2018), the monster film Godzilla: King of the Monsters (2019), and the crime drama The Many Saints of Newark (2021).

On television, Farmiga received Primetime Emmy Award nominations for playing Norma Louise Bates in the A&E drama horror series Bates Motel (2013–2017) and starring in the Netflix miniseries When They See Us (2019). She also appears in the Disney+ miniseries Hawkeye (2021) set in the Marvel Cinematic Universe, and the Apple TV+ miniseries Five Days at Memorial (2022).

== Early life, family and education ==
Farmiga was born on August 6, 1973, in Clifton, New Jersey, US. Her parents are Ukrainians: Mykhailo Farmiga, a systems analyst-turned-landscaper, and his wife Lubomyra "Luba" (née Spas), a schoolteacher. Farmiga has an older brother, Victor, and five younger siblings: Stephan, Nadia, Alexander, Laryssa (who was born with spina bifida), and Taissa. Their maternal grandparents, Nadia (née Pletenciw) and Theodor Spas, met at a displaced persons camp in Karlsfeld during World War II. As a child, Farmiga converted with her family from the Ukrainian Greek Catholic Church to Pentecostalism.

Farmiga considers herself to be "100% Ukrainian-American". She was raised in an insular Ukrainian-American community in Irvington, with Ukrainian being her first language. Farmiga did not learn English until she started kindergarten at the age of six. When she was 12 years old, the family moved from Irvington to Whitehouse Station. Farmiga attended St. John the Baptist Ukrainian Catholic School in Newark and toured with a Ukrainian folk-dancing ensemble named Syzokryli during her teen years. In addition to being a semi-professional folk dancer, she is also a classically trained pianist. She was a member of Plast.

Farmiga graduated from Hunterdon Central Regional High School in 1991. During her junior year there, she found acting after being sidelined during a varsity soccer game; her friend convinced her to audition for the school production of The Vampire, and she won the lead role of Lady Margaret. Farmiga studied theater at Syracuse University, where she graduated in 1995. In her final year at Syracuse, she portrayed Nina Zarechnaya in The Seagull at the Kennedy Center American College Theater Festival, and the production won the top prize. Her drama professor Gerardine Clark stated, "We'd never have won had she not nailed the fourth act. A number of the judges told me that."

== Career ==
=== 1990s ===
In February 1996, Farmiga starred as Miranda in the American Conservatory Theater's production of The Tempest. That same year, she portrayed Anne Hartman in a production of Good at The Barrow Group. Farmiga made her Broadway debut alongside Ed Harris and Daniel Massey in October 1996, understudying the role of Emmi Straube in Ronald Harwood's play Taking Sides Following these stage roles, she co-starred in the Hallmark Hall of Fame western television film Rose Hill in April 1997, portraying Emily Elliot.

Farmiga had a main role in Fox's short-lived fantasy adventure series Roar (1997), alongside Heath Ledger and Sebastian Roché. The following year, she guest-starred in an episode of NBC's procedural drama series Law & Order, portraying Lindsay Carson, the daughter of a convicted murderer who goes on her own killing spree. She made her feature film debut playing a supporting role alongside Vince Vaughn and Joaquin Phoenix in the drama-thriller Return to Paradise (1998). Also that year, she had a guest appearance in the NBC drama series Trinity, portraying Allison.

=== 2000s ===
Farmiga's next film was the crime drama The Opportunists (2000), in which she co-starred as Miriam Kelly, the daughter of Christopher Walken's character. She also had a supporting role as Lisa Tyler in the romantic drama Autumn in New York (2000). The following year, Farmiga had a supporting role as Daphne Handlova in the action thriller 15 Minutes, alongside Robert De Niro, and co-starred in the drama film Dust, which premiered at the 2001 Venice Film Festival. Farmiga subsequently joined the main cast of NBC's short-lived procedural drama series UC: Undercover, as Alex Cross. The series premiered in September 2001, and was cancelled after one season. She then appeared in the Hallmark fantasy television film Snow White: The Fairest of Them All.

Farmiga had her first starring role in the romantic drama Love in the Time of Money, which premiered at the 2002 Sundance Film Festival. In June 2002, she starred in David Eldridge's Under the Blue Sky at the Williamstown Theatre Festival. Farmiga next appeared as Lorena Fanchetti in the comedy-drama Dummy (2003), alongside Adrien Brody.

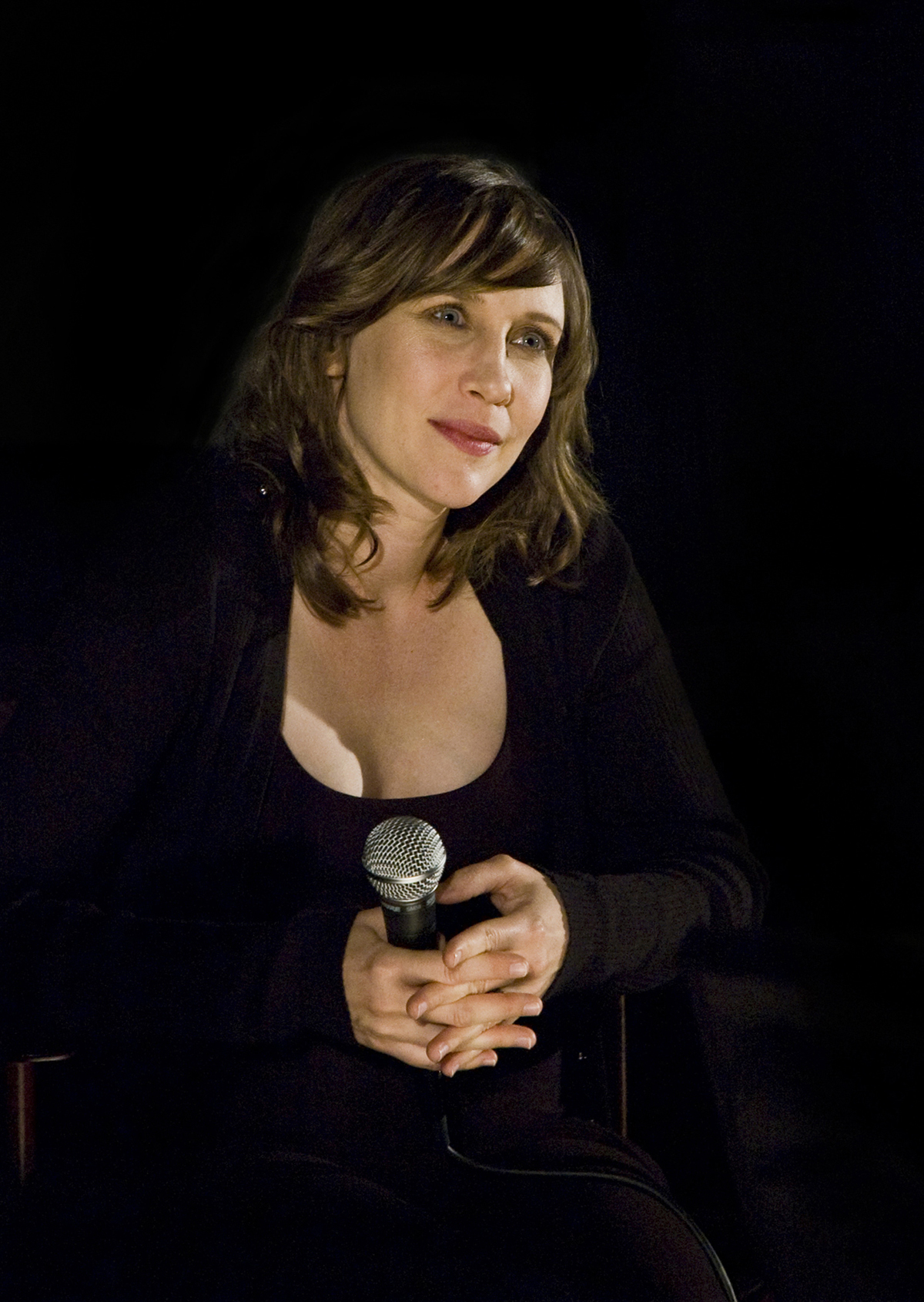
Farmiga at a screening of The Boy in the Striped Pyjamas in November 2008

The following year, Farmiga had her breakthrough role as a drug-addicted mother, Irene Morrison, in the independent drama film Down to the Bone, which premiered at Sundance in January 2004. Praising her performance, Peter Travers of Rolling Stone wrote: "If there were an ounce of taste left in Hollywood, the magnificent Vera Farmiga would be a front-runner for the Best Actress Oscar". She won the Los Angeles Film Critics Association Award for Best Actress, and earned a nomination for the Independent Spirit Award for Best Female Lead.

Farmiga next appeared alongside Hilary Swank and Anjelica Huston in the HBO drama film Iron Jawed Angels (2004), as the Polish-American suffragette Ruza Wenclawska. Soon after, she had a supporting role in the 2004 film Mind The Gap, in which she portrayed a woman who left her fiancé at the altar. She then starred as Detective Susan Branca in the short-lived USA Network adaptation of the British crime drama series Touching Evil.

Also in 2004, she had a supporting role as Jocelyne Jordan in the political thriller The Manchurian Candidate, which also starred Denzel Washington and Meryl Streep. The following year, she co-starred in the fantasy drama Neverwas with Aaron Eckhart and Ian McKellen, which premiered at the 2005 Toronto International Film Festival. Farmiga then appeared alongside Leonardo DiCaprio and Matt Damon as police psychiatrist Dr. Madolyn Madden in Martin Scorsese's crime drama The Departed (2006). For her performance as Madolyn, Farmiga was nominated for the Empire Award for Best Newcomer, and shared with her co-stars the nomination for the Screen Actors Guild Award for Outstanding Performance by a Cast in a Motion Picture. Soon after, she portrayed Dr. Charlie Brooks in the 2006 indie thriller, The Hard Easy.

She next starred as Teresa Gazelle in Wayne Kramer's crime thriller Running Scared, and as the Romanian prostitute Oana in Anthony Minghella's romantic crime drama Breaking and Entering (both in 2006). Farmiga subsequently landed the lead role of Sophie Lee in Gina Kim's romantic drama Never Forever, which premiered at the 2007 Sundance. G. Allen Johnson of the San Francisco Chronicle praised her as "the best American actress you've never heard of". She next starred as Abby Cairn in the psychological thriller film Joshua (2007), with Sam Rockwell, and portrayed Fiona Ankany in the drama film Quid Pro Quo, which premiered at the 2008 Sundance. David Edelstein of New York magazine stated that Farmiga's performance on the latter film was "scarily good", and added: "She's always visibly calculating, thinking better of something reckless she's about to do – then doing it anyway".

In September 2008, the historical drama The Boy in the Striped Pyjamas, in which she portrayed Elsa Hoess, was released worldwide. Farmiga won the British Independent Film Award for Best Actress for her performance. That same year, she starred in the war drama film In Transit alongside John Malkovich, and portrayed Central Intelligence Agency operative Erica Van Doren in the political thriller Nothing But the Truth. The latter role earned Farmiga a nomination for the Critics' Choice Movie Award for Best Supporting Actress.

In 2009, Farmiga portrayed the lead role of Kate Coleman in Jaume Collet-Serra's psychological thriller Orphan. The film was co-produced by Leonardo DiCaprio, who had starred with Farmiga in The Departed. Her performance was praised, with Toby Young of The Times writing that she "becomes more convincing as the story unfolds. By the end, she has you in the palm of her hand". She then appeared as Aurora de Valday in Niki Caro's romantic drama The Vintner's Luck, which premiered at the 2009 Toronto International Film Festival.

Also in 2009, she co-starred as frequent flyer Alex Goran, opposite George Clooney, in Jason Reitman's comedy-drama Up in the Air. Roger Ebert of the Chicago Sun-Times praised Farmiga's performance, stating that she "is one of the warmest and most attractive women in the movies, or at least she plays one". She received nominations for the Academy Award for Best Supporting Actress, Screen Actors Guild Award for Outstanding Performance by a Female Actor in a Supporting Role, BAFTA Award for Best Actress in a Supporting Role, Golden Globe Award for Best Supporting Actress, and her second nomination for the Critics' Choice Movie Award for Best Supporting Actress. On June 25, 2010, she was inducted into the Academy of Motion Picture Arts and Sciences.

=== 2010s ===
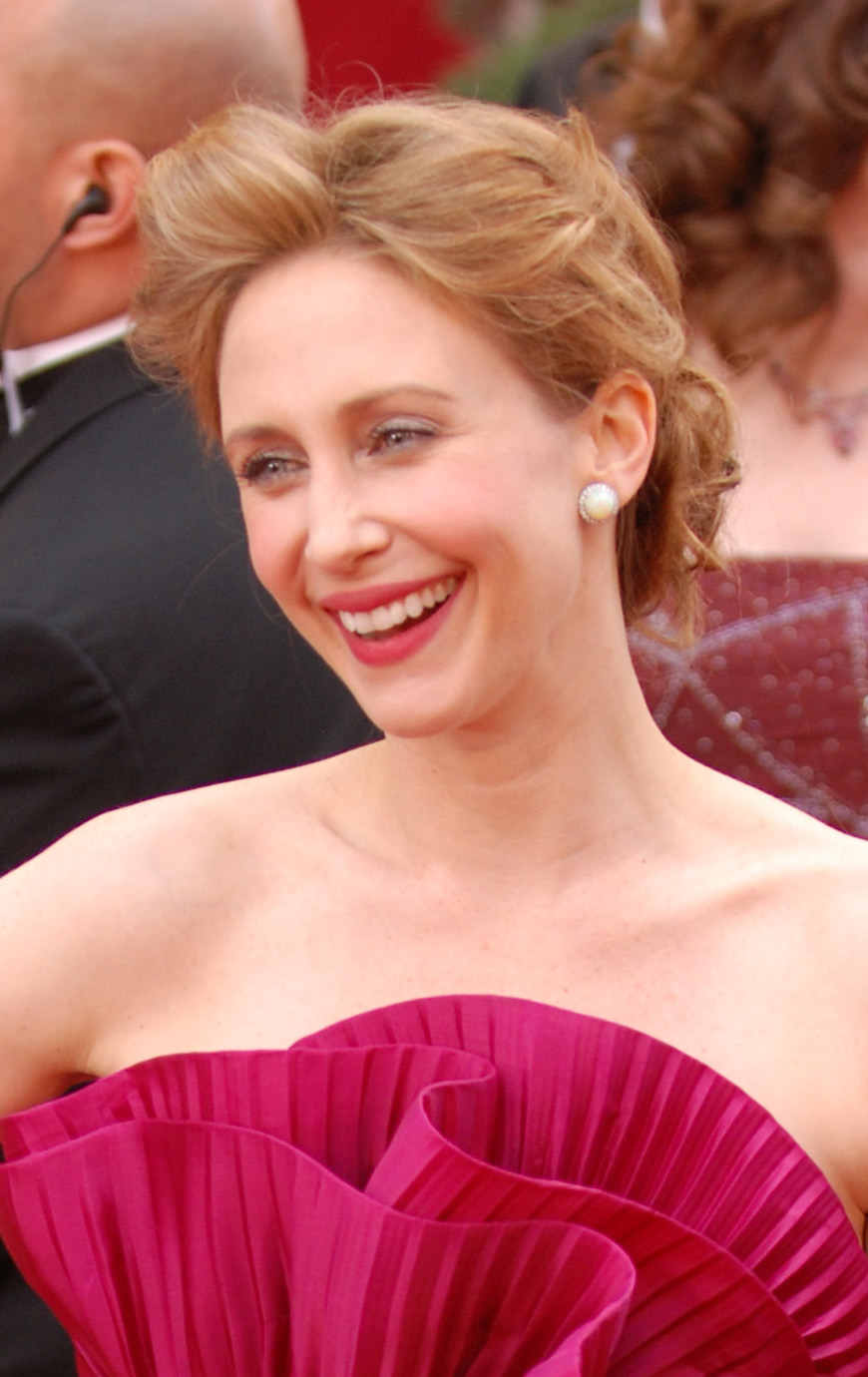
Farmiga at the Academy Awards in March 2010

Farmiga then starred in the surrealist romantic comedy Henry's Crime as stage actress Julie Ivanova, which premiered at the 2010 Toronto International Film Festival. She next played Capt. Colleen Goodwin in Duncan Jones' science fiction thriller film Source Code, which premiered at the 2011 South by Southwest. In 2010, Farmiga was offered a lead role in Marc Forster's action biopic Machine Gun Preacher, but declined because she was pregnant.

During her second pregnancy, Farmiga made her directorial debut with the micro-budget, Christian-themed drama Higher Ground, in which she starred as the protagonist, Corinne Walker. The film received "generally favorable reviews" on review aggregator site Metacritic and premiered at the 2011 Sundance. Many of her family members were involved in the production: Farmiga's sister Taissa portrayed Corinne as a teenager, her husband Renn Hawkey served as a producer and musical director, and her cousin Adriana Farmiga served as an art curator. She received nominations in both acting and directing for the film, including the Gotham Independent Film Award for Breakthrough Director, and the Satellite Award for Best Actress – Motion Picture. In his film review, critic Kirk Honeycutt of The Hollywood Reporter noted: "Directing debuts by actors don't come any better than this". Of her performance, Leonard Maltin of IndieWire remarked that Farmiga "gives an honest, empathetic performance should come as no surprise; she is one of the most gifted and daring actresses of our time".

Her next role was the flaky New Age mother Wendy Whitman in the independent comedy-drama Goats, which opened at the 2012 Sundance. That same year, she portrayed CIA operative Catherine Linklater in Daniel Espinosa's action thriller Safe House (2012). Farmiga starred opposite Ryan Reynolds and, for the second time, Denzel Washington.

Farmiga's return to television came in 2013, when she began portraying Norma Louise Bates, the mother of Norman Bates, in A&E's drama-thriller series Bates Motel. The series is a contemporary reboot of Alfred Hitchcock's classic horror film Psycho (1960). For her performance, she won the 2013 Saturn Award for Best Actress on Television, and the 2016 People's Choice Award for Favorite Cable TV Actress. She also received three nominations for the Critics' Choice Television Award for Best Actress in a Drama Series (2013–2015), as well as nominations for the 2013 Satellite Award for Best Actress – Television Series Drama, the 2013 Primetime Emmy Award for Outstanding Lead Actress in a Drama Series, and the 2013 TCA Award for Individual Achievement in Drama. Tim Goodman of The Hollywood Reporter called Farmiga's performance "superb" and Mary McNamara of the Los Angeles Times identified her as "the main reason [the series] is surprisingly good". In addition to starring, she served as a producer and later executive producer from the second season to its fifth and final season, which aired in 2017.

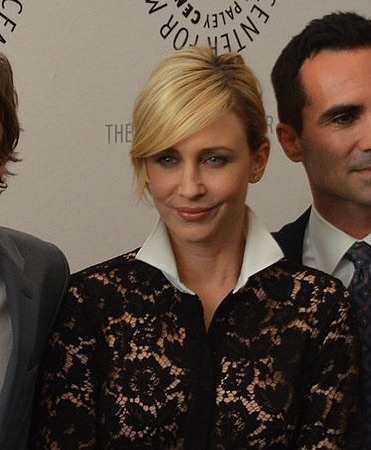
Farmiga at the Paley Center for Media for Bates Motel in May 2013

She next appeared in James Wan's horror film The Conjuring (2013), which was met with critical and commercial success. The film became the second highest-grossing horror film of all time up to that date. Farmiga portrayed paranormal investigator and self-professed clairvoyant Lorraine Warren, alongside Patrick Wilson, for which she was nominated for the MTV Movie Award for Best Scared-As-Shit Performance. Sheri Linden of The Hollywood Reporter wrote that "Farmiga resonates an extraordinary sensitivity" in the role, while Justin Chang of Variety called her performance "moving" and highlighted her chemistry with Wilson as a "rock-solid rapport".

She reprised her role in the sequel, The Conjuring 2 (2016), which was also directed by Wan. The film was the second released in the main series, but the third released within The Conjuring Universe. Like its predecessor, The Conjuring 2 was met with a positive critical reception and commercial success, surpassing The Conjuring as the second highest-grossing horror film of all time.

Farmiga appeared as Edith Martin in the romantic comedy At Middleton, with Andy García and her sister Taissa. The film premiered at the Seattle International Film Festival in May 2013. Also in 2013, she starred as Alice Bercovich in Nae Caranfil's Romanian-American comedy-drama Closer to the Moon, based on the events of the Ioanid Gang. Farmiga next co-starred in David Dobkin's drama film The Judge (2014) as Samantha Powell, the love interest and high school girlfriend of Robert Downey Jr.'s character. She then starred as Eleanor Finch in Ricky Gervais' comedy Special Correspondents, which premiered at the 2016 Tribeca Film Festival. She next appeared as Alise Firth in Jordan Roberts' adventure comedy-drama Burn Your Maps, which premiered at the 2016 Toronto International Film Festival. Farmiga co-starred as Dr. Nora Phillips in Neill Blomkamp's BMW short film The Escape (2016), alongside Dakota Fanning and Clive Owen. The following year, she executive produced the documentary film Unspoken, which premiered at the Mill Valley Film Festival in October 2017.

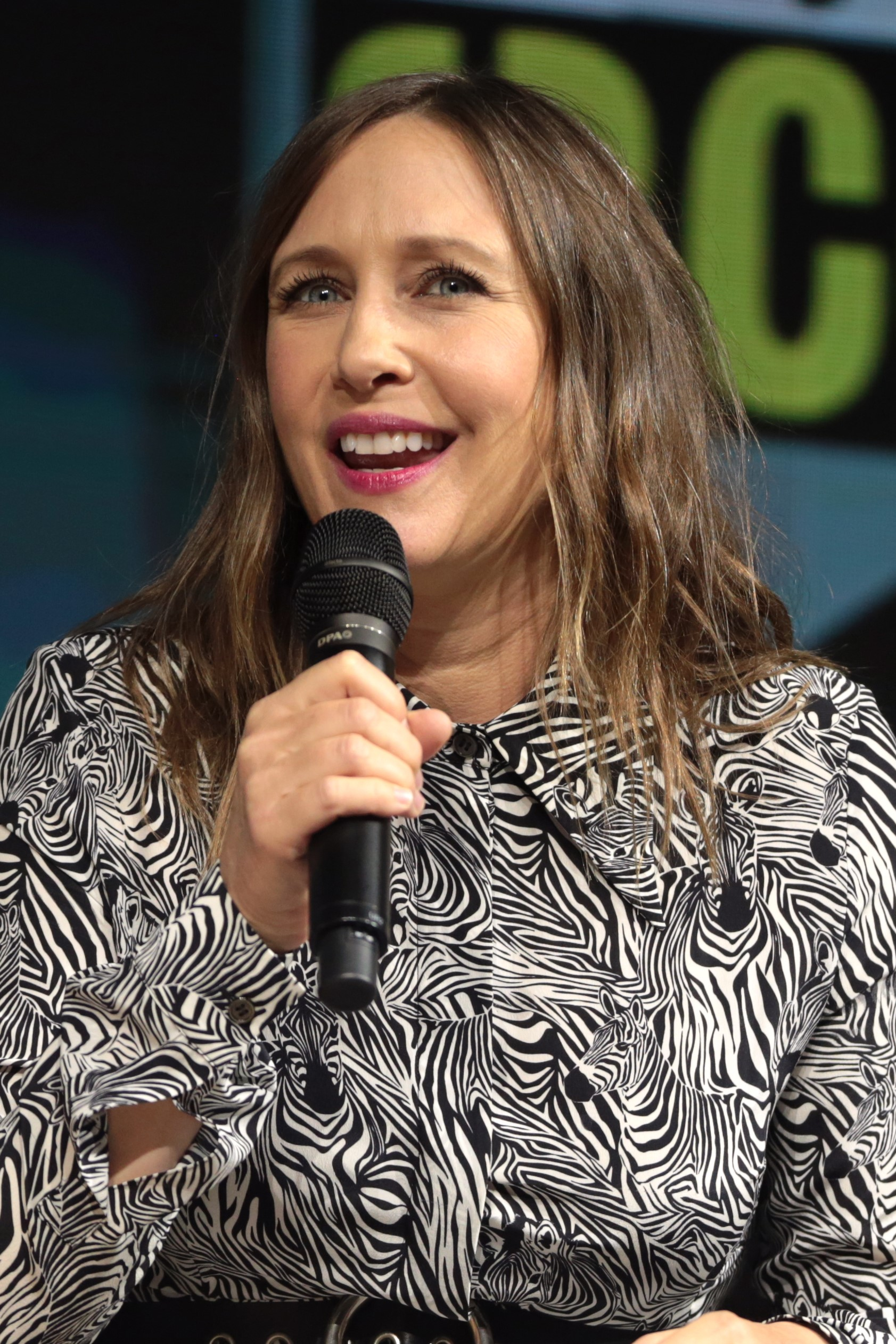
Farmiga in 2018

Farmiga co-starred with Liam Neeson in Jaume Collet-Serra's action thriller The Commuter, which was released in January 2018. Also in January 2018, she appeared as a politician in Amazon's sci-fi anthology series Philip K. Dick's Electric Dreams, in an episode directed by Dee Rees. Farmiga then portrayed Laura Jaconi in Shana Feste's comedy-drama film Boundaries, which premiered in March 2018 at South by Southwest. Next in 2018, Farmiga starred as neo-Nazi group leader Shareen Krager in Guy Nattiv's racial drama Skin, which premiered at the Toronto International Film Festival in September, and portrayed Oletha "Lee" Hart in Jason Reitman's Gary Hart biopic The Front Runner, opposite Hugh Jackman, which was released in November 2018.

In March 2019, she starred as Jane Doe alongside John Goodman in Rupert Wyatt's science fiction thriller Captive State. In May 2019, she portrayed Dr. Emma Russell in the third installment of the MonsterVerse film franchise, Godzilla: King of the Monsters, directed by Michael Dougherty. Also in May 2019, Farmiga portrayed prosecutor Elizabeth Lederer in Ava DuVernay's Netflix crime drama miniseries When They See Us, based on the Central Park jogger case. For her performance, she was nominated for the Primetime Emmy Award for Outstanding Supporting Actress in a Limited Series or Movie. In June 2019, she reprised her role as Lorraine Warren in the horror sequel film Annabelle Comes Home.

=== 2020s ===
In May 2021, Farmiga made a special guest appearance in Netflix's drama limited series Halston, based on the life of the fashion designer of the same name, opposite Ewan McGregor in the title role. She then reprised her role as Lorraine Warren in The Conjuring: The Devil Made Me Do It, released in June 2021. In September 2021, Farmiga appeared as Livia Soprano in the film prequel to The Sopranos, titled The Many Saints of Newark, directed by Alan Taylor. Following this, she starred as Eleanor Bishop, the mother of Hailee Steinfeld's character, in the Marvel Cinematic Universe superhero miniseries Hawkeye, which premiered on Disney+ in November 2021.

In August 2022, Farmiga starred in the lead role of Dr. Anna Pou in the critically acclaimed Apple TV+ limited series Five Days at Memorial, an adaptation of the book of the same name by Sheri Fink. In 2023, she made a cameo appearance as Lorraine Warren in a mid-credits scene of the horror sequel The Nun II, using a scene cut from The Conjuring: The Devil Made Me Do It. That same year, Farmiga had roles in Ava DuVernay's drama film Origin, an adaptation of the non-fiction book Caste: The Origins of Our Discontents by Isabel Wilkerson, and the comedy-drama film Ezra, directed by Tony Goldwyn.

In October 2025, Farmiga played a main role in the LGBTQ+ comedy-drama series Boots, as Barbara Cope, the protagonist's mother.

In 2026, Farmiga played the title character in the Heaven's Gate Cult biopic The Leader, portraying group founder Bonnie Nettles alongside Tim Blake Nelson as Marshall Herff Applewhite. She will also voice a character in the upcoming animated series Gossamer, based on the novel of the same name by Lois Lowry.

== Music ==
In October 2024, Farmiga debuted as a singer in the band The Yagas, with a single titled "The Crying Room". In February 2025, the band released a second single titled "She's Walking Down", which Farmiga wrote as a way to alleviate her fears of child trafficking that she had been dreaming about. The band's first album, Midnight Minuet, was released on April 25, 2025.

== Personal life ==
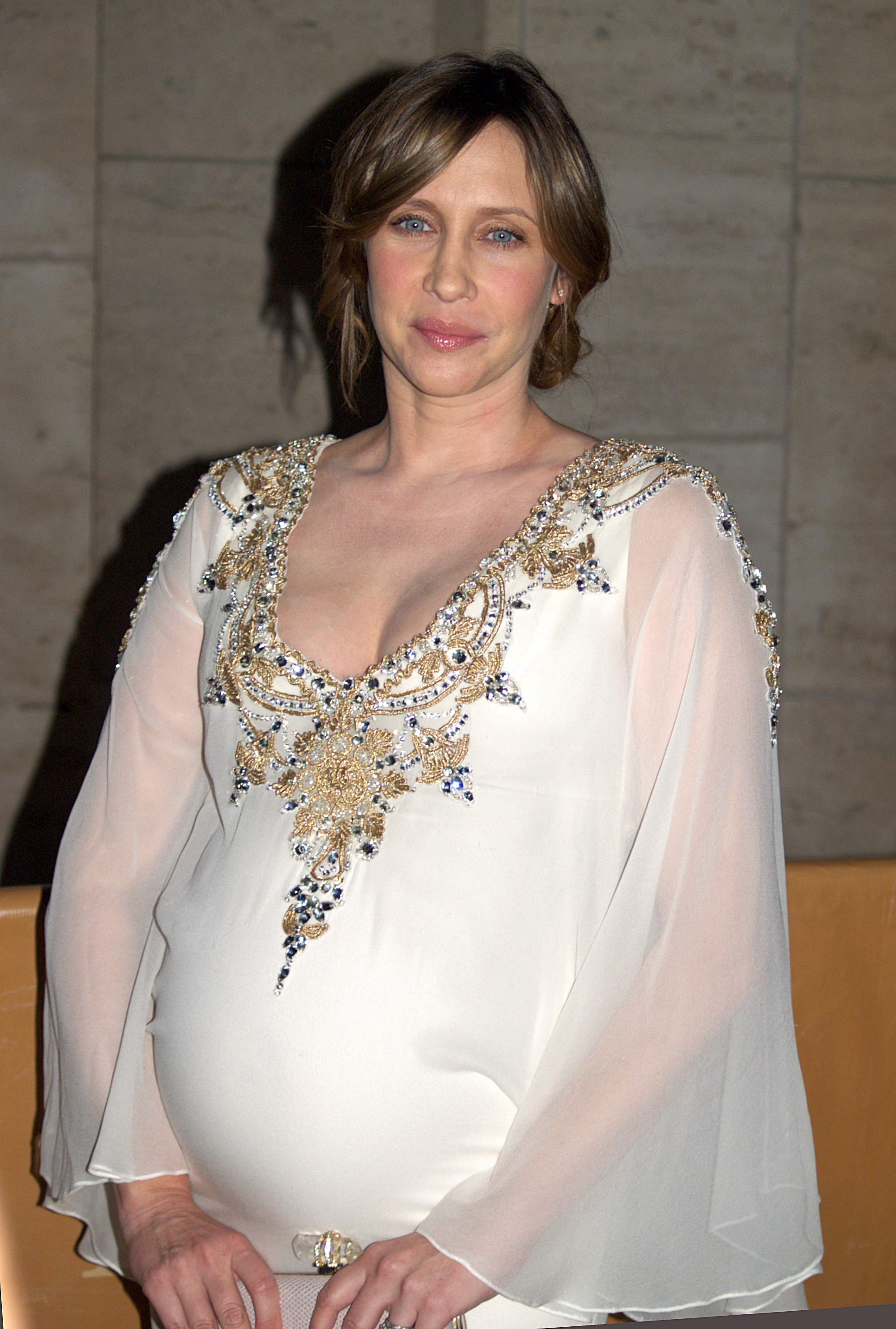
Farmiga in 2010 at the New York Metropolitan Opera

Farmiga met actor Sebastian Roché while starring together in the fantasy adventure television series Roar; after it ended in 1997, they eloped to the Bahamas and later divorced in 2004. She began dating Deadsy musician Renn Hawkey, after being introduced by mutual friend, filmmaker Allen Hughes, on the set of Touching Evil. They married on September 13, 2008, when Farmiga was five months pregnant with their first child. She gave birth to a son in January 2009 in Rhinebeck, New York and a daughter in November 2010. The family owns homes in Hudson Valley, New York and Vancouver, British Columbia.

Farmiga's sister-in-law is actress and photographer Molly Hawkey. She is close friends with her Bates Motel co-star Freddie Highmore, who is godfather to her son, and with her Conjuring co-star Patrick Wilson.

Farmiga is a nondenominational Christian; in a 2011 interview with Christianity Today, Farmiga said:

I grew up in a Ukrainian Catholic-turned-Christian household, and that is my family's faith. My father instilled in me ... to define God, to define holiness for myself. That was my parents' number one lesson for us. I don't belong to any particular church, but I'm someone who will be able to walk into any place of worship, any house of worship, and have a direct correspondence.

== Filmography and awards ==
According to the review-aggregate site Rotten Tomatoes and the box office site Box Office Mojo, Farmiga's highest-grossing and most critically acclaimed films include Down to the Bone (2004), The Manchurian Candidate (2004), The Departed (2006), The Boy in the Striped Pyjamas (2008), Orphan (2009), Up in the Air (2009), Source Code (2011), Safe House (2012), The Conjuring (2013), The Conjuring 2 (2016), The Commuter (2018), Godzilla: King of the Monsters (2019), Annabelle Comes Home (2019), and The Conjuring: The Devil Made Me Do It (2021).

For her role in Up in the Air (2009), Farmiga gained nominations for an Academy Award for Best Supporting Actress, a Golden Globe Award for Best Supporting Actress, a BAFTA for Best Actress in a Supporting Role, and a Screen Actors Guild Award for Outstanding Female Actor in a Supporting Role. Farmiga received nominations for a Primetime Emmy Award for Outstanding Lead Actress in a Drama Series for her role in Bates Motel (2013–2017). For her performance in the miniseries When They See Us (2019), Farmiga received her second Primetime Emmy Award nomination, in the category of Outstanding Supporting Actress in a Limited Series or Movie.. For her role as Bonnie Lu Nettles in The Leader, Farmiga won the Director's Choice Award for Best Ensemble Cast at the Woods Hole Film Festival shared by Tim Blake Nelson, Jim Parsons, Grace Caroline Currey, and Simon Rex.
