= Chin Han (actor, born 1969) =

Singaporean actor

- 黄经汉
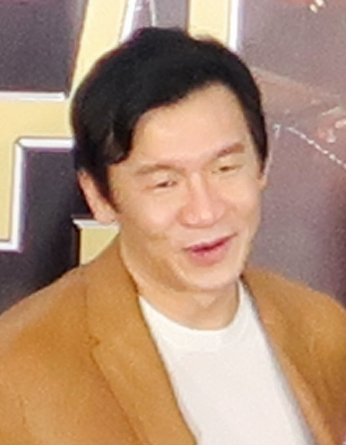
- Chin Han at a press conference for Skyscraper in 2018
- Born: Ng Chin Han; 27 November 1969 (age 56); Singapore
- Education: National University of Singapore
- Occupation: Actor
- Years active: 1988–present
- Height: 5 ft 9 in (1.75 m)

Chinese name
- Traditional Chinese: 黃經漢
- Simplified Chinese: 黄经汉
Transcriptions
Standard Mandarin
- Hanyu Pinyin: Huáng Jīnghàn
Yue: Cantonese
- Yale Romanization: Wong^{4} Ging^{1}-hon^{3}

Ng Chin Han (Chinese: 黄经汉; pinyin: Huáng Jīnghàn; born 27 November 1969) is a Singaporean stage, film, and television actor whose career has spanned more than 20 years.

== Career ==
In 1994, Chin Han had a leading role in Masters of the Sea, the first full-length English drama series to be produced in Singapore.

In 1998, he made his US film debut in Blindness, an Official Selection at the 2nd Hollywood Film Festival in a leading role opposite Vivian Wu. Soon after, he starred in the Singapore mini-series Alter Asians which won the 2001 Asian Television Award for Best TV Movie of the Year.

As a director, he has helmed acclaimed Asian premieres of plays like David Hare's The Blue Room and co-produced the official musical adaptation of Ang Lee's The Wedding Banquet.

As a producer, Chin Han has also created concerts for Tony Award winners Jason Robert Brown, Cady Huffman and Lillias White in Asia. In Los Angeles, he served as Associate Producer (credited as Chin Han Ng) on the 2006 Asian Excellence Awards that featured stars like Jackie Chan, Maggie Q, Quentin Tarantino and Danny DeVito.

Returning to the big screen, his strong supporting performance in Thom Fitzgerald's 3 Needles with Lucy Liu, Sandra Oh and Chloe Sevigny led one movie reviewer to note that for his 'small but important role, (Chin Han) delivers in SPADES' (I-S Magazine).

In 2008, Chin Han co-starred as Lau in the summer blockbuster movie The Dark Knight and was described by director Christopher Nolan as having 'a great presence... it was exactly what the character required' (South China Morning Post). The following year, he joined John Cusack, Chiwetel Ejiofor and Woody Harrelson in Roland Emmerich's epic disaster movie 2012, which grossed more than $750 million worldwide.

Chin Han then worked with Oscar-nominated director Gus Van Sant on the film Restless, produced by Ron Howard and Brian Grazer, and official selection for the 64th Cannes Film Festival's Un Certain Regard Opening Gala Film. The film also starred Mia Wasikowska and Henry Hopper.

Following his history of working with award-winning directors, he next joined the star-studded ensemble in Steven Soderbergh's biohazard thriller Contagion from Warner Bros as epidemiologist Sun Feng. The film also starred Matt Damon, Kate Winslet, Marion Cottilard, Jude Law and Gwyneth Paltrow.

On US prime time television, Chin Han has guest-starred on J.J. Abrams's Fringe and has had recurring roles on ABC's Last Resort and the CW's hit show Arrow. In 2013, he completed The Sixth Gun, a pilot based on the popular graphic novel for NBC Universal and played Wu Jing in NBC's breakout show The Blacklist with James Spader. In 2014, he had a role as Councilman Yen in the Marvel Cinematic Universe movie Captain America: The Winter Soldier. Versatile as an actor, he is also one of the main players in IFC's 2015 comedy miniseries The Spoils Before Dying with Will Ferrell and Kristen Wiig.

Back in Asia, Chin Han has starred with Michelle Yeoh in Final Recipe, an intergenerational drama about celebrity chefs produced by CJ Entertainment, South Korea's largest entertainment company. Heading up an international cast for HBO Asia's groundbreaking series Serangoon Road, Chin Han's other Asian credits include China-US co-production of acclaimed Chinese short story A Different Sun and A Sweet Life from China hit producer Ning Hao.

In 2015, Chin Han played Chancellor Jia Sidao in the Netflix series Marco Polo and followed that with a 2nd collaboration with director Roland Emmerich on the long-awaited sequel to Independence Day, Independence Day: Resurgence.

In 2017, he co-starred with Scarlett Johansson and Japanese legend Takashi 'Beat' Kitano in Rupert Sander's live-action adaptation of anime Ghost In The Shell for Paramount/DreamWorks SKG.

Chin Han subsequently had substantial roles in the action-disaster film Skyscraper from Universal, co-starring with Dwayne Johnson and Neve Campbell, and New Line's 2021 Mortal Kombat and its 2026 sequel, playing Shang Tsung.

== Filmography ==
=== Films ===
Year	Title	Role	Director	Notes	Ref.
2005	3 Needles	Soldier Xuan	Thom Fitzgerald		
2008	The Dark Knight	Chen Lau	Christopher Nolan		
2009	2012	Tenzin	Roland Emmerich		
2011	Restless	Dr. Lee	Gus Van Sant		
2011	Contagion	Sun Feng	Steven Soderbergh		
2013	Final Recipe	David Chan	Gina Kim		
2014	Captain America: The Winter Soldier	Councilman Yen	Anthony and Joe Russo		
2016	Independence Day: Resurgence	Commander Jiang	Roland Emmerich		
2017	Ghost in the Shell	Togusa	Rupert Sanders		
2018	Skyscraper	Zhao Long Ji	Rawson Marshall Thurber		
2021	Mortal Kombat	Shang Tsung	Simon McQuoid		
2026	Mortal Kombat II	Shang Tsung	Simon McQuoid		
TBA	The Big Fix †	Dan Tan	Baltasar Kormákur	Filming	

=== Television ===
Year	Title	Role	Notes	Ref.
1994	Masters of the Sea	Edward Cheng	Main role	
2012	Fringe	Neil Chung	1 episode	
2012–13	Last Resort	Zheng Min	4 episodes	
2013	Arrow	Frank Chen	4 episodes	
2013	Serangoon Road	Kay Song	Recurring role, 6 episodes	
2013–23	The Blacklist	Wujing	Recurring role, 7 episodes	
2014	Marco Polo	Jia Sidao	Main role, 11 episodes	
2015	The Spoils Before Dying	Salizar Vasquez Deleon	Miniseries, 5 episodes	
2017	Lethal Weapon	Det. Henry Cho	1 episode	
2023	American Born Chinese	Simon Wang	Main role, 8 episodes	
2026	Avatar: The Last Airbender	Long Feng	Recurring role, 5 episodes	

=== Video games ===
Year	Title	Voice role	Notes
2012	Sleeping Dogs	Sonny	
