= List of awards and nominations received by Vera Farmiga =

Vera Farmiga awards and nominations
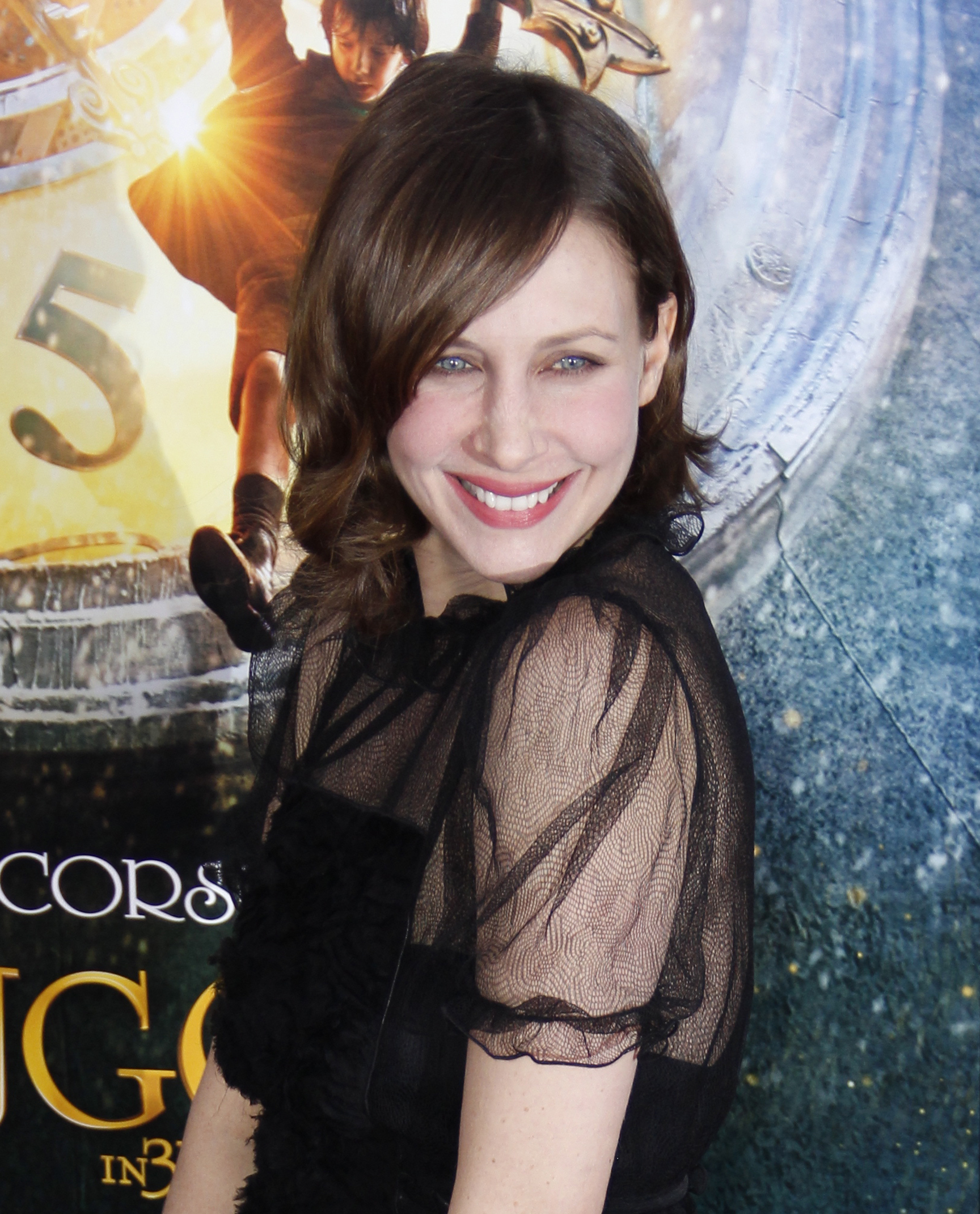
- Farmiga at the New York premiere of Hugo on November 21, 2011
Awards and nominations (Note: Certain award groups do not simply award one winner. They recognize several different recipients, have runners-up, and have third place. Since this is a specific recognition, and is different from losing an award, runner-up mentions are considered wins in this award tally. Awards in certain categories do not have prior nominations, and only winners are announced by the jury. For simplification, and to avoid errors, each award in this list has been presumed to have had a prior nomination.)
Award	Wins	Nominations
Totals
Academy Awards	0	1
British Academy Film Awards	0	1
Critics' Choice Movie Awards	0	4
Critics' Choice Television Awards	0	3
Empire Awards	0	1
Golden Globe Awards	0	1
Gotham Awards	0	1
Independent Spirit Awards	0	1
MTV Movie Awards	0	1
People's Choice Awards	1	1
Primetime Emmy Awards	0	2
Satellite Awards	1	3
Saturn Awards	1	3
Screen Actors Guild Awards	0	2
Wins	17
Nominations	81

Vera Farmiga is an American actress, director, and producer. She garnered worldwide acclaim for her role in the 2009 film Up in the Air. This role earned Farmiga nominations for the Academy Award for Best Supporting Actress, the Golden Globe Award for Best Supporting Actress – Motion Picture, the BAFTA Award for Best Actress in a Supporting Role and the Screen Actors Guild Award for Outstanding Performance by a Female Actor in a Supporting Role, as well as many other nominations. In 2011, she made her directing debut with the acclaimed drama film Higher Ground, for which she received multiple award nominations, including the Gotham Award for Best Breakthrough Director and the Satellite Award for Best Actress.

From 2013 to 2017, she starred in the A&E television series Bates Motel as Norma Louise Bates. Her performance in the role has earned her a Saturn Award for Best Actress on Television (2013) and a People's Choice Award (2016), and nominations for the Primetime Emmy Award for Outstanding Lead Actress in a Drama Series (2013), the Satellite Award for Best Actress – Television Series Drama (2013), the TCA Award for Individual Achievement in Drama (2013), and the Critics' Choice Television Award for Best Actress in a Drama Series (2013–2015). In 2019, Farmiga portrayed prosecutor Elizabeth Lederer in the acclaimed Netflix miniseries When They See Us. For her performance, she received a nomination for the Primetime Emmy Award for Outstanding Supporting Actress in a Limited Series or Movie.

== Major awards ==
=== Academy Awards ===
Year	Nominated work	Category	Result	Ref.
2010	Up in the Air	Best Supporting Actress	Nominated	

=== BAFTA Awards ===
Year	Nominated work	Category	Result	Ref.
2010	Up in the Air	Best Actress in a Supporting Role	Nominated	

=== Golden Globe Awards ===
Year	Nominated work	Category	Result	Ref.
2010	Up in the Air	Best Supporting Actress – Motion Picture	Nominated	

=== Primetime Emmy Awards ===
Year	Nominated work	Category	Result	Ref.
2013	Bates Motel	Outstanding Lead Actress in a Drama Series	Nominated	
2019	When They See Us	Outstanding Supporting Actress in a Limited Series or Movie	Nominated	

=== Screen Actors Guild Awards ===
Year	Nominated work	Category	Result	Ref.
2007	The Departed	Outstanding Performance by a Cast in a Motion Picture	Nominated^{[A]}	
2010	Up in the Air	Outstanding Performance by a Female Actor in a Supporting Role	Nominated	

== Critics' awards ==
=== African American Film Critics Association Television Awards ===
Year	Nominated work	Category	Result	Ref.
2019	When They See Us	Best Ensemble Cast	Won	

=== Boston Society of Film Critics Awards ===
Year	Nominated work	Category	Result	Ref.
2006	The Departed	Best Ensemble Cast	Runner-up^{[A]}	

=== Chicago Film Critics Association Awards ===
Year	Nominated work	Category	Result	Ref.
2009	Up in the Air	Best Supporting Actress	Nominated	

=== Critics' Choice Awards ===
Year	Nominated work	Category	Result	Ref.
2006	The Departed	Best Acting Ensemble	Nominated^{[A]}	
2008	Nothing But the Truth	Best Supporting Actress	Nominated	
2009	Up in the Air	Best Supporting Actress	Nominated	
2009	Up in the Air	Best Acting Ensemble	Nominated^{[B]}	
2013	Bates Motel	Best Actress in a Drama Series	Nominated	
2014	Bates Motel	Best Actress in a Drama Series	Nominated	
2015	Bates Motel	Best Actress in a Drama Series	Nominated	

=== Dallas–Fort Worth Film Critics Association Awards ===
Year	Nominated work	Category	Result	Ref.
2009	Up in the Air	Best Supporting Actress	3rd Place	

=== Denver Film Critics Society Awards ===
Year	Nominated work	Category	Result	Ref.
2009	Up in the Air	Best Acting Ensemble	Nominated^{[B]}	
2009	Up in the Air	Best Supporting Actress	Nominated	

=== Detroit Film Critics Society Awards ===
Year	Nominated work	Category	Result	Ref.
2009	Up in the Air	Best Supporting Actress	Nominated	

=== Dublin Film Critics' Circle Awards ===
Year	Nominated work	Category	Result	Ref.
2006	Breaking and Entering	Best Supporting Actress	Runner-up	
2006	The Departed	Best Supporting Actress	Runner-up	

=== Hollywood Critics Association TV Awards ===
Year	Nominated work	Category	Result	Ref.
2023	Five Days at Memorial	Best Actress in a Streaming Limited or Anthology Series or Movie	Nominated	

=== Houston Film Critics Society Awards ===
Year	Nominated work	Category	Result	Ref.
2009	Up in the Air	Best Supporting Actress	Nominated	

=== London Film Critics' Circle Awards ===
Year	Nominated work	Category	Result	Ref.
2009	Up in the Air	Actress of the Year	Nominated	

=== Los Angeles Film Critics Association Awards ===
Year	Nominated work	Category	Result	Ref.
2005	Down to the Bone	Best Actress	Won	

=== National Board of Review Awards ===
Year	Nominated work	Category	Result	Ref.
2006	The Departed	Best Acting by an Ensemble	Won^{[A]}	

=== National Society of Film Critics Awards ===
Year	Nominated work	Category	Result	Ref.
2005	Down to the Bone	Best Actress	3rd Place^{[C]}	

=== New York Film Critics Circle Awards ===
Year	Nominated work	Category	Result	Ref.
2009	Up in the Air	Best Supporting Actress	Runner-up	

=== Online Film Critics Society Awards ===
Year	Nominated work	Category	Result	Ref.
2009	Up in the Air	Best Supporting Actress	Nominated	

=== San Diego Film Critics Society Awards ===
Year	Nominated work	Category	Result	Ref.
2009	Up in the Air	Best Supporting Actress	Nominated	

=== St. Louis Gateway Film Critics Association Awards ===
Year	Nominated work	Category	Result	Ref.
2009	Up in the Air	Best Supporting Actress	Nominated	

=== Television Critics Association Awards ===
Year	Nominated work	Category	Result	Ref.
2013	Bates Motel	Individual Achievement in Drama	Nominated	

=== Toronto Film Critics Association Awards ===
Year	Nominated work	Category	Result	Ref.
2009	Up in the Air	Best Supporting Actress	Nominated	

=== Vancouver Film Critics Circle Awards ===
Year	Nominated work	Category	Result	Ref.
2009	Up in the Air	Best Supporting Actress	Won	

=== Washington D.C. Area Film Critics Association Awards ===
Year	Nominated work	Category	Result	Ref.
2009	Up in the Air	Best Ensemble	Nominated^{[B]}	
2009	Up in the Air	Best Supporting Actress	Nominated	

== Other awards ==
=== Alliance of Women Film Journalists Awards ===
Year	Nominated work	Category	Result	Ref.
2009	Up in the Air	EDA Award – Best Actress in Supporting Role	Nominated	
2011	Higher Ground	EDA Female Focus Award – Best Woman Director	Nominated	

=== BendFilm Festival Awards ===
Year	Nominated work	Category	Result	Ref.
2004	Down to the Bone	Jury Prize – Best Actress	Won	

=== Boston Film Festival Awards ===
Year	Nominated work	Category	Result	Ref.
2013	At Middleton	Festival Prize – Best Actress	Won	

=== British Independent Film Awards ===
Year	Nominated work	Category	Result	Ref.
2008	The Boy in the Striped Pyjamas	Best Performance by an Actress	Won	

=== Dorian Awards ===
Year	Nominated work	Category	Result	Ref.
2013	Bates Motel	TV Performance of the Year – Actress	Nominated	

=== Empire Awards ===
Year	Nominated work	Category	Result	Ref.
2006	The Departed	Best Female Newcomer	Nominated	

=== Fangoria Chainsaw Awards ===
Year	Nominated work	Category	Result	Ref.
2015	Bates Motel	Best TV Actress	Runner-up	
2016	Bates Motel	Best TV Actress	Nominated	

=== Gopo Awards ===
Year	Nominated work	Category	Result	Ref.
2014	Closer to the Moon	Best Actress in a Leading Role	Nominated	

=== Gotham Awards ===
Year	Nominated work	Category	Result	Ref.
2011	Higher Ground	Breakthrough Director	Nominated	

=== Gracie Awards ===
Year	Nominated work	Category	Result	Ref.
2015	Bates Motel	Outstanding Female Actor in a Leading Role in a Drama	Won	

=== Independent Spirit Awards ===
Year	Nominated work	Category	Result	Ref.
2004	Down to the Bone	Best Female Lead	Nominated	

=== Marrakech International Film Festival Awards ===
Year	Nominated work	Category	Result	Ref.
2004	Down to the Bone	Best Actress	Won	

=== MTV Movie Awards ===
Year	Nominated work	Category	Result	Ref.
2014	The Conjuring	Best Scared-As-Shit Performance	Nominated	

=== People's Choice Awards ===
Year	Nominated work	Category	Result	Ref.
2017	Bates Motel	Favorite Cable TV Actress	Won	

=== Provincetown International Film Festival Awards ===
Year	Nominated work	Category	Result	Ref.
2011	Herself	Excellence in Acting Award	Won	

=== Qantas Film and Television Awards ===
Year	Nominated work	Category	Result	Ref.
2010	The Vintner's Luck^{[D]}	Best Lead Actress in a Feature Film	Won	

=== Santa Barbara International Film Festival Awards ===
Year	Nominated work	Category	Result	Ref.
2010	Herself	Cinema Vanguard Award	Won^{[E]}	

=== Satellite Awards ===
Year	Nominated work	Category	Result	Ref.
2006	The Departed	Best Ensemble in a Motion Picture	Won^{[A]}	
2011	Higher Ground	Best Actress in a Motion Picture	Nominated	
2013	Bates Motel	Best Actress in a Drama Series	Nominated	

=== Saturn Awards ===
Year	Nominated work	Category	Result	Ref.
2013	Bates Motel	Best Actress on Television	Won	
2014	Bates Motel	Best Actress on Television	Nominated	
2016	Bates Motel	Best Actress on Television	Nominated	

=== Sundance Film Festival Awards ===
Year	Nominated work	Category	Result	Ref.
2004	Down to the Bone	Special Jury Prize for Acting	Won	
2011	Higher Ground	Grand Jury Prize – Dramatic (Director)	Nominated	

=== Village Voice Film Poll Awards ===
Year	Nominated work	Category	Result	Ref.
2009	Up in the Air	Best Supporting Actress	Runner-up	

=== Women's Image Network Awards ===
Year	Nominated work	Category	Result	Ref.
2011	Higher Ground	Outstanding Film Directed by a Woman	Nominated	
2011	Higher Ground	Outstanding Actress – Feature Film	Won	
2013	Bates Motel	Outstanding Actress – Drama Series	Nominated	
2014	Bates Motel	Outstanding Actress – Drama Series	Nominated	
2015	Bates Motel	Outstanding Actress – Drama Series	Nominated	
2015	Bates Motel	Outstanding Drama Series	Nominated	
2016	Bates Motel	Outstanding Actress – Drama Series	Nominated	

== Notes ==
- A Shared with Anthony Anderson, Alec Baldwin, Matt Damon, Leonardo DiCaprio, Jack Nicholson, Martin Sheen, Mark Wahlberg, and Ray Winstone.
- B Shared with Jason Bateman, George Clooney, Sam Elliott, Zach Galifianakis, Anna Kendrick, Melanie Lynskey, Danny McBride, Amy Morton, and J. K. Simmons.
- C Tied with Kate Dollenmayer for Funny Ha Ha.
- D Originally titled The Vintner's Luck.
- E Honored alongside Peter Sarsgaard, Christoph Waltz, and Stanley Tucci.

== See also ==
- Vera Farmiga on screen and stage
