= Adriana Farmiga =

American visual artist

- Born: July 17, 1974 (age 52); Rosendale, New York, U.S.
- Education: Cooper Union (B.F.A., 1996); Milton Avery Graduate School of the Arts (M.F.A., 2004)
- Occupations: Visual artist; curator; professor
- Years active: 2001–present
- Relatives: Vera Farmiga (paternal cousin); Taissa Farmiga (paternal cousin)
- Website: adrianafarmiga.com

Adriana Farmiga (/fɑːrˈmiːɡə/ far-MEE-gə; born July 17, 1974) is an American visual artist, curator, and professor based in New York City. She serves as a programming advisor for the non-profit La Mama Gallery in the East Village, and is the current Associate Dean at Cooper Union School of Art. In June of 2024 Farmiga was promoted Dean at Cooper Union.

== Early life ==
Farmiga was born and raised in a small Ukrainian community in Rosendale, New York. Her paternal first cousins are actresses Vera Farmiga and Taissa Farmiga. She was educated at Cooper Union, graduating with a Bachelor of Fine Arts degree in 1996. Farmiga went on to study at the Milton Avery Graduate School of the Arts at Bard College, where she was taught by the late installation artist Maryanne Amacher; she received her Master of Fine Arts degree from Bard in 2004.

== Career ==
Farmiga began teaching at Temple University's Tyler School of Art and at her alma mater Cooper Union. Additionally, she served as a visiting lecturer at the Rhode Island School of Design in 2013. In October 2017, Farmiga was appointed to the position of Assistant Dean at Cooper Union School of Art.

Farmiga has displayed her artwork at many solo exhibitions, including objects (2001) in New Orleans, 'Scape (2006) in Miami, and Versus (2012) in New York. In 2004, Farmiga was among a group of artists displaying their work in the exhibition The Reality of Things at Triple Candie in Harlem. In 2008, she received the Emerging Artist Fellowship from Socrates Sculpture Park.

In 2011, Farmiga worked as a curator and artist for her cousin Vera Farmiga's directorial debut film Higher Ground. That same year, her work appeared in Thisorganized, a group exhibit curated by painter Hope Gangloff, which was displayed at the Susan Inglett Gallery. In 2013, Farmiga was part of the Screen Play exhibition at the Samuel Dorsky Museum of Art in New Paltz. The following year, she was one of 16 artists chosen, from over 320 applicants, to display her work in the Worlds of Wonder exhibition, also shown at the Samuel Dorsky Museum of Art.

In December 2016, Farmiga's work as part of CIM began showing at the Ukrainian Museum, where it was exhibited until September 2017. From January to February 2017, her work as part of Abandoned Luncheonette was exhibited at the Jeff Bailey Gallery in Hudson, New York. In April 2018, it was announced that Farmiga was one of twelve visual artists whom had been granted a summer fellowship at the MacDowell Colony.

== Exhibitions ==
=== Solo ===
Year	Title	Location
2001	objects	Marguerite Oestreicher Gallery
2006	'Scape	Spinello Gallery
2008	44/55	La Mama Gallery
2009	lives	Newman Popiashvili Gallery
2012	Versus	La Mama Gallery
2014	Still Life	La Mama Gallery
2015	Suite for Pong	New Media Gallery
2017	HA HA FRESH	La Mama Gallery
2017	Blue Hour	Marisa Newman Projects

=== Group ===
Year	Title	Location
2001	Under the Influence	Contemporary Arts Center
2003	Enchante	Bard College
2004	Serralves Casa Project	Serralves Museum
2004	Gallery Exchange: Placemaker	Guild & Greyshkul Gallery
2004	Shelters	Byrdcliffe Arts Colony
2004	The Reality of Things	Triple Candie
2004	ache	La Mama Gallery
2005	Something is Somewhere	Monya Rowe Gallery
2005	Red White and Blue	Spencer Brownstone Gallery
2005	Frisbee	Cavalier Hotel
2006	Advent	ArtCenter/South Florida
2006	Speed Limit	Lower Manhattan Cultural Center
2006	The Tupperware Party	Spinello Gallery
2006	At Hand	Lower Manhattan Cultural Center
2006	Spiral Huset	Tensta Konsthall
2007	Free Frisbee	Cirrus Gallery & Cavalier Hotel
2007	M*A*S*H	The Helena
2007	Smash and Grab	Locust Projects
2007	Red Badge of Courage	Newark Arts Council
2007	Dream of Today	Steve Turner Contemporary
2008	Brucennial	Bruce High Quality Foundation
2008	intransit	Moti Hasson Gallery
2008	Where Are We	Pearl Gallery
2008	Art Crush	Jenny Jaskey Gallery
2008	Zig Zag	Hariyat Karakov Gallery
2008	Without Walls	Museum 52
2009	Beauty Underfoot	Smack Mellon
2009	Unmistakable	HERE Arts Center
2009	The Armory Show	Socrates Sculpture Park
2010	Made in Rosendale	Roos Arts Gallery
2011	Pretty Vacant	Brooklyn, New York
2011	Shapeshifters	443 PAS
2011	Thisorganized	Susan Inglett Gallery
2012	Graphomania	Geoffrey Young Gallery
2013	Almanac	Newman Popiashvili Gallery
2013	Eight Ball	Geoffrey Young Gallery
2013	Our Backyard	Roos Arts Gallery
2013	Screen Play	Samuel Dorsky Museum
2014	Worlds of Wonder	Samuel Dorsky Museum
2014	Autumn/Flat Light Through An Open Door	Dumbo Arts Festival
2016	Dress the Form	Derek Eller Gallery
2016	Spirits in the Material World	Prizm Art Fair
2016	CIM	Ukrainian Museum
2017	Abandoned Luncheonette	Jeff Bailey Gallery
2017	Whitney Houston Biennial	New York City, New York
2017	Supreme Friction	Geoffrey Young Gallery
2017	Rally in the Valley	Instar Lodge and September Gallery
2017	CIM	Ukrainian Museum
2017	The Transphysics We Knew About...	Prizm Art Fair
2018	Indeterminacy	Koenig & Clinton Gallery
2018	NADA New York	La Mama Gallery
