= How to Make a Monster (2001 film) =

2001 television film by George Huang

- DVD cover
- Based on: How to Make a Monster; 1958 film by Herbert L. Strock
- Written by: George Huang
- Directed by: George Huang
- Starring: Steven Culp; Clea DuVall; Tyler Mane; Jason Marsden; Karim Prince; Julie Strain
- Music by: David Reynolds
- Country of origin: United States
- Original language: English

Production
- Producers: Lou Arkoff; Colleen Camp; Stan Winston
- Cinematography: Steven Finestone
- Editors: Daniel Cahn; Kristina Trirogoff
- Running time: 91 mins
- Production companies: Columbia Tristar Home Entertainment; Creature Features Productions

Original release
- Network: Cinemax
- Release: October 14, 2001

How to Make a Monster is a 2001 film starring Steven Culp and Clea DuVall. It is the third release in the Creature Features series of film remakes produced by Stan Winston. Julie Strain made a cameo appearance in the film as herself. How to Make a Monster debuted on October 14, 2001, on Cinemax. In 2005, it was nominated for a Hollywood Makeup Artist Award and Hair Stylist Guild Award.

== Plot ==
Following a disastrous video game test, Clayton Software fires the development team and replaces them with weapons expert Hardcore, game artificial intelligence designer Sol, and sound effects creator Bug. Company CEO Faye Clayton promises $1 million to whoever makes the scariest game, sparking a rivalry amongst the trio. Three weeks later, the programmers try out their game and computer network-integrated motion capture suit with help from company intern Laura Wheeler. However, lightning strikes the building, causing a blackout and wiping their data. Knowing someone has to stay overnight to monitor the backup, the four use the game to decide. Ultimately, Sol is chosen to stay behind.

After he inserts his new AI chip into the company mainframe, the suit activates and kills Sol. The following morning, Hardcore and Bug find Sol's body merged to the suit and the backup CD gone. The former attempts to review the security camera's footage, but is attacked by the suit, which decapitates him so it can take his body and weapons to better resemble one of the game's monsters. Upon learning of what happened, Bug theorizes the lightning strike, Sol's chip, and Hardcore's system rewrite caused the suit to believe the real world is part of the game. To stop the monster, Bug, Laura, and Clayton businessman Peter Drummond try to shut down the computer and wipe the game's data. However, the security system malfunctions, trapping them inside. The monster attacks Bug, but he exposes a gas line and uses his lighter to ignite the gas, killing himself and the monster. Nonetheless, it returns to the mo-cap suit and attacks Drummond, but Laura saves him by fighting the in-game monster. She tries to beat the game, but becomes frustrated and hysterical until Drummond suggests she use a virtual reality headset, promising to stay with her while she fights. In the midst of playing though, she realizes he left her before the real world monster returns. She escapes to the kitchen, where she finds Hardcore's PDA contains footage of Drummond stealing the backup CD. She later finds and confronts Drummond at gunpoint. After he mocks her, she shoots him in the knee and allows the monster to kill him before luring it to a fish tank to electrocute it.

Sometime later, a jaded, world weary Laura turns in the final version of the game and demands the bonus for herself, which she uses to become the new CEO of Clayton Software, renaming it Wheeler Software.

== Cast ==
- Steven Culp as Peter S. Drummond, a hardened businessman at Clayton Software. He is revealed to have stolen the copy of the evil monster for the game.
- Clea DuVall as Laura Wheeler, the kind, 24-year-old intern of Clayton Software. Eventually, Laura kills the monster and becomes a ruthless CEO.
- Tyler Mane as "Hardcore", the muscular developer who is responsible for designing the game's weapons for motion capture sessions.
- Jason Marsden as "Bug", the developer who creates the sound and music for the game.
- Karim Prince as Sol, the developer who programs the game's artificial intelligence.
- Julie Strain as Herself, Strain makes a cameo appearance in the film when she arrives for a motion-capture session.
- James Sullivan as The Monster, who is brought to life through a motion capture suit as a result of a lightning strike.
- Colleen Camp as Faye Clayton, the head of the computer software company Clayton Software.
- Danny Masterson (uncredited) as Jeremy, the abusive boyfriend of Laura Wheeler.

== DVD release ==
How to Make a Monster was released on DVD on June 11, 2002 by Columbia Tri-Star Home Entertainment. The film is presented in anamorphic widescreen and its audio is presented in 5.1 surround sound in both English and French. Extra features include a "making-of" featurette, photo galleries of drawings and behind-the-scenes images, and theatrical trailers for other Columbia TriStar horror films. The DVD also includes DVD-ROM content for personal computers.

== Reception ==
Nathan Rabin of The A.V. Club wrote, "Huang's film intermittently qualifies as an intriguing experiment, but it quickly runs out of ideas and energy." Maitland McDonagh of TV Guide rated it 2/4 stars and wrote, "One in a series of made-for-cable, in-name-only remakes of cheesy cult classics, this sci-fi horror picture is tailor-made for people who hate video games." Beyond Hollywood wrote that the film's budget limitations and technological ignorance make it "at best silly, and at worst pure crap". Adam Tyner of DVD Talk rated it 2/5 stars and concluded, "It's not an awful movie, after all...just a decidedly lackluster one."
