= Trojan War (film) =

1997 teen comedy film

- Theatrical release poster
- Directed by: George Huang
- Written by: Andy Burg; Scott Myers
- Produced by: Charles Gordon
- Starring: Will Friedle; Jennifer Love Hewitt; Marley Shelton
- Cinematography: Dean Semler
- Edited by: Ed Marx
- Music by: George S. Clinton
- Production company: Daybreak
- Distributed by: Warner Bros.
- Release date: September 26, 1997
- Running time: 84 minutes
- Country: United States
- Language: English
- Budget: $15 million
- Box office: $309

Trojan War is a 1997 American teen comedy film directed by George Huang and starring Will Friedle, Jennifer Love Hewitt, and Marley Shelton. The film was a critical and box office failure. Produced for $15 million, it made only $309 in ticket sales because it was played at two movie theaters in the United States and was pulled after only a week.

== Plot ==
High school student Brad has had an unrequited crush on his classmate Brooke for years. After she asks him to come over one night to tutor her, she ends up wanting to have sex with him. But he only wants safe sex, and does not have a condom. In his quest to buy some condoms, he runs into all sorts of trouble: his dad's sportscar gets stolen and then wrecked, he has a run-in with a crazy bus driver, he is held hostage, he is pursued by a school janitor who accuses him of drawing graffiti, an odd pair of Hispanic siblings who thinks he looks like David Hasselhoff, Brooke's dog, Brooke's jealous boyfriend Kyle, and a homeless man who wants two dollars from him (and has secretly stolen his wallet), and he is arrested.

After all of this and finally receiving a condom from a police officer who releases him, he realizes that the perfect girl has been there for him all along: his best friend Leah, who has had feelings for him for a long time unbeknownst to Brad. Finally, Brad realizes his feelings for Leah while also discovering Brooke is not as great as he thought she was after he finds out that she only wants a one-night stand with him instead of a relationship. Brad runs out to find Leah and professes his feelings to her, and they kiss each other by moonlight.

After the end credits, Brad's parents are shocked by what is left of their car after the tow truck driver brings it back.

== Cast ==
- Will Friedle as Brad Kimble
- Jennifer Love Hewitt as Leah Jones
- Marley Shelton as Brooke Kingsley
- Danny Masterson as Seth
- Jason Marsden as Josh
- Eric Balfour as Kyle
- Lee Majors as Officer Austin
- John Finn as Ben Kimble
- Wendie Malick as Beverly Kimble
- Jennie Kwan as Trish
- Charlotte Lopez as Nina
- Christine Deaver as Latin Mama
- Mike Moroff as "Big Brother"
- lobo Sebastian as Lead Homeboy
- Joe Cerrano as Biggest Homeboy
- Julian Cegario as Homeboy
- Paulo Tocha as Janitor
- Anthony Michael Hall as Bus Driver
- David Patrick Kelly as Bagman
- Danny Trejo as "Scarface"

== Production ==
Prior to the film's release, it was noted that there were similarities with its condom plot to another film in development, Booty Call, which featured an all-black cast and which would also be released in 1997. Booty Call was written without knowledge of Trojan War's existence.

Actor Will Friedle was dating co-star Jennifer Love Hewitt at the time, and has also said that his involvement in the film led to him becoming friends with director George Huang.

== Release ==
Trojan War was released in only two theaters in the fall of 1997, and was pulled after a single week. One of the theaters was in Boulder, Colorado, and the only two people in attendance were Friedle and Huang, who had flown out to Colorado. It earned a total of $309 against a production budget of $15 million. As of 2007, it was the fifth-lowest-grossing film since modern record-keeping began in the 1980s.

== Reception ==
Nathan Rabin of The A.V. Club wrote in 2002: "It may be formulaic, predictable and as substantial as a Little Debbie snack cake, but as a loving, inane throwback to the golden age of the Brat Pack and the two Coreys, it's irresistible." Roger Garcia's 2001 book Out of the Shadows: Asians in American Cinema stated that the film was "actually better than it sounds", noting that it "went straight to video and has never been recognized for its delicate comedy of errors." Charles Tatum of efilmcritic had a more negative review in 2005, writing that: "Sometimes, a movie comes along that makes you want to sob, and not in the good way." In his book TLA Film, Video, and DVD Guide 2002-2003, David Bleiler described Trojan War as a "sloppy, hodgepodge of Some Kind of Wonderful and Adventures in Babysitting", labeling Friedle's character as a "generic cute guy", and Shelton's character as a "generic blonde."
