= Final Recipe =

- Film poster
- Directed by: Gina Kim
- Screenplay by: George Huang
- Story by: Gina Kim
- Produced by: Yeonu Choi; Jeong Tae-sung; Steven Nam; Gina Kim
- Starring: Michelle Yeoh; Henry Lau; Chin Han
- Cinematography: Kim Young-ho; Kim Jun-young
- Edited by: Steve M. Choe
- Music by: Mok Young-jin
- Production companies: CJ Entertainment; Bang Singapore; Grand Elephant
- Release date: September 21, 2013 (SSIFF)
- Running time: 97 minutes
- Countries: South Korea; Thailand
- Language: English

Final Recipe is a 2013 Malaysian-Singaporean drama film directed by Gina Kim and written by George Huang, who adapted a story by Kim. It stars Michelle Yeoh, Henry Lau, and Chin Han. Lau plays a young man who must impress Yeoh, who is the host, producer, and one of two judges of a cooking competition show, along with and the reigning master chef, David Chen, in order to win a large prize money to save his grandfather's restaurant. It premiered at the San Sebastián International Film Festival.

== Plot ==
Red Phoenix's Singaporean restaurant is in danger of going out of business due to the owner Hao's difficult personality despite the food being great. Hao was once a famous chef. Now Hao's only hope is that his grandson Mark enters a prestigious university to become an engineer. However Mark's dream is to follow his grandfather's footsteps and become a chef and take over the family restaurant. After Hao has a heart attack, Mark secretly travels to Shanghai to participate in a cooking competition show without his grandfather's knowledge and consent. He takes the place of a contestant who did not show up. During the competition, Mark's food reminds Julie of when the show was being created and she was searching for a chef and finds David Chen. They show the falling out between Chef Han and his father (Chef Hoa) and that there was a fire at the restaurant and Chef Hao lies to Julie and says Mark died in the fire.

In the first round, the chef has to make the perfect omelette. Mark's stove wasn't working and he had to improvise, which caused him not have a finished dish when the chef came to judge. He was able to finish the omelette and go onto the next round. In the second round the chefs cook in teams of 4. There is tension in the team and the chefs don't get a long. At the last minute, Mark decided the meat did not require the sauce and put his hand out to stop the sauce and burns himself. The team qualifies for the next round. David Chen, in the control room, notices Mark. In the third round the team is given a large sum of money to make a really nice dish. The team argues and ends up splitting up and Mark almost goes home with a portion of the money, but comes back. When he comes back, two of his teammates are arguing and the pressure cooker blows up and all the prepared food is ruined. Another teammate, who spent his portion of the money on shoes, instead of ingredients, suggests they make a bibimba

During the competition, Julie taste Marks food and has a flashback of when she discovered David Chen and tried his food for the first time. There is another flashback of the falling out between David and his father when he decides to join the show. They show all the accolades that David receives and then shows a young Mark in the restaurant with his grandfather pointing at David on TV and asking when will Dad come home. The grandfather is drinking and won't answer the grandson and hears someone at the door. He goes to the door, while he is at the door, Mark wants to try and cook and goes towards the stove. Grandfather hears Mark cry and we see the kitchen in flames. Grandfather calls Julie and asks to speak to David and tells her its about his son. Julie pretends to speak to David and says he will call him back later. Grandfather is frustrated and says the family doesn't need David anymore and his son is dead.

To make sure that there are no surprises, Julie has a background check done on all the competitors. She has her private detective go to Moscow to look into Dimitri. Julie has had this detective on retainer, looking for the whereabout of David's family after fire and what happened to his son. The detective finally located the family in Singapore and tracked down Dimitri; who never left Moscow. Julie realizes Mark is David's son before the finale and tells Mark. Mark calls and confronts his grandfather. Julie moves the venue of the finale to Singapore and finds out Mark ran away. Julie finds Mark and persuades him to come back.

During the finale, Julie changes the theme on the spot from Asian food to what food makes you think of family. David cooks a whole lot of dishes representing birthday dishes for every birthday he missed since his son died. Mark made one bowl that he presents to David instead of the judges. David doesn't know what to do; his father shows up and tells him to try his son's food. There is a great reunion between father, son and grandfather.

== Cast ==
- Michelle Yeoh as Julia Lee
- Henry Lau as Mark
- Chin Han as David Chen
- Tseng Chang as Hao
- Lori Tan Chinn as Mrs. Wang
- Bobby Lee as Park
- Lika Minamoto as Kaori
- Aden Young as Sean
- George Young as Bob 'Benny' Tan, moderator of the contest
- Byron Bishop as Chef Gio Kwan
- Patrick Teoh as Mr. Lee
- Sahajak Boonthanakit as Detective Jack Jien

== Production ==
Production started in Thailand on May 24, 2012, and the film was reported to be in post-production by January 31, 2013.

== Release ==
Final Recipe premiered at the San Sebastián International Film Festival on September 21, 2013.

== Reception ==
Jay Weissberg of Variety called it a shallow and predictable film but said that Yeoh "makes the saccharine flavors go down slightly better". Clarence Tsui of The Hollywood Reporter described it as "a mild, feel-good tale about reconciliation of three generations of a cookery-gifted clan". Mark Adams of Screen Daily wrote, "The heart of Final Recipe may be pure melodrama, but it is a glossy and enjoyable journey."
