= Never Forever =

2007 film by Gina Kim

- Theatrical release poster
- Hangul: 두번째 사랑
- RR: Dubeonjjae sarang
- MR: Tubŏntchae sarang
- Directed by: Gina Kim
- Written by: Gina Kim
- Produced by: Lee Chang-dong; Lee Joon-dong; Andrew Fierberg
- Starring: Vera Farmiga; Ha Jung-woo; David Lee McInnis
- Cinematography: Pete Beaudreau
- Edited by: Matthew Clark
- Music by: Michael Nyman
- Production companies: Now Films; Vox3 Films
- Distributed by: Arts Alliance
- Release dates: 18 January 2007 (Sundance); 21 June 2007 (South Korea); 11 April 2008 (United States)
- Running time: 104 minutes
- Countries: South Korea; United States
- Languages: English; Korean
- Budget: $3 million
- Box office: $687,229

Never Forever (Korean: 두번째 사랑; lit. 'Second Love') is a 2007 romantic drama film written and directed by Gina Kim, and starring Vera Farmiga. The film was critically acclaimed when it was first screened at the 2007 Sundance Film Festival, and won the Jury Prize at the Deauville American Film Festival.

== Plot ==
Arriving home after her father-in-law's funeral, Sophie Lee (Vera Farmiga), a Caucasian woman, and her husband Andrew (David Lee McInnis), a Korean-American, have sex on their kitchen table; Andrew breaks down in her arms shortly after. At the doctor's office, Sophie is told that her husband's sperm isn't healthy enough to get her pregnant, and she pleads with Dr. Hanson (Marceline Hugot) to secretly give her someone else's sperm, though the doctor refuses.

Sophie is encouraged by Andrew's family to pray for a baby, but when she asks Andrew how to pray, he says God can't make her become pregnant. While waiting for an appointment at the clinic, Sophie witnesses an Asian man, Jihah Kim (Ha Jung-woo), arrive to make a donation. She listens outside the door during his doctor's interview, and hears that Jihah is an illegal alien and they cannot accept his sperm. When he storms out of the room, Sophie follows him to a dry cleaners in Chinatown, but doesn't have the courage to talk to him.

Following a party one night, Sophie awakens to find Andrew has attempted suicide. While he recovers in hospital, Sophie goes back to the laundromat. She follows Jihah to his building and waits outside his apartment. When he returns home, Sophie propositions him for sex; she offers Jihah $300 per session, and if they are successful in getting pregnant, an additional $30,000 in cash. He agrees, and the two have sex. After Sophie accidentally falls asleep after one of their sessions, they begin to bond.

While working at the dry cleaners one day, Jihah notices Sophie outside and encounters Andrew who comes in to pick up his jacket. Before their next meeting, a dismissive Jihah takes Sophie out to eat, and says that he saw her husband. They argue after he notes his physical similarities to Andrew; Sophie retorts that all he's good for is his penis. He follows her out into the street, where she breaks down and tells Jihah of Andrew's suicidal tendencies because he is sterile. Jihah takes Sophie to a spot in the park where he prays.

For the first time, Sophie and Jihah become intimate during one of their sessions. When she arrives home, she tells Andrew that Dr. Hanson has new procedures they could attempt, but he says they should give up trying. Sophie then tells him that, before they were married, he got her pregnant but she had an abortion. Andrew walks away. The next morning, the two go to church, and Sophie faints. Meanwhile, Jihah is seen buying flowers and browsing for jewelry. Back at his apartment, Sophie arrives and tells him she's pregnant, paying him the $30,000. Jihah offers his congratulations and the two part bittersweetly.

As Sophie and Andrew celebrate her pregnancy, Jihah goes through the laundromat's receipts to find their address. The next day, Andrew and Sophie host a party, and Jihah shows up. Andrew goes to greet him, and Jihah says he must have the wrong address; he sneaks away to watch from a distance. As the group begin a prayer, Sophie fantasizes about Jihah.

Days later, Sophie visits Jihah at his apartment and the two become intimate once again. She and Andrew then find out that the baby is a boy. Later that day, Sophie's cab is late when she attempts to go to Jihah's, so she catches the train instead. Meanwhile, Andrew arrives home early and answers the door to the delayed taxi driver. Andrew drives to Jihah's address and overhears Sophie with him from outside the door. Jihah gives Sophie a key to his apartment. While Sophie is there one day, police show up and detain Jihah for his illegal residence in the United States.

When Sophie returns home, Andrew informs her that he knows about her affair. He asks that she abort the child so that he can forgive her, to which she adamantly refuses. Andrew restrains Sophie and attempts to drag her upstairs; she screams and begs for him to let her go until he releases her. Jihah is told by authorities that he will be deported the next morning; while being held, he requests to make a phone call. Sophie goes to Jihah's spot in the park to pray. She then goes to Jihah's apartment, where she answers a ringing cellphone. A few years later, a visibly pregnant Sophie is seen on the beach with her son. While he plays in the water, Sophie watches and knits for the new baby.

== Cast ==
- Vera Farmiga as Sophie Lee
- Ha Jung-woo as Jihah Kim
- David Lee McInnis as Andrew Lee
- Alex Manette as Jesse
- Shirley Roeca as Tania
- Marceline Hugot as Dr. Hanson
- Jackson Pace as Adam
- Joseph Y. Kim as Pastor
- Trisha LaFache as Receptionist
- Becky London as Interviewer
- Robert Dahey as Laundromat Owner
- Kari Swenson Riely as Miriam
- Hettienne Park as Ming Ming
- Asa Somers as Rich
- Quinn Peck as Sophie's son
- Lee Hwa-si as Mrs. Lee
- Yoon Joo-hee as Jihah's girlfriend

== Reception ==
=== Box office ===
In the United States, the film made $14,485 domestically. It went on to make a further $672,744 in foreign markets, for a total worldwide gross of $687,229.

=== Critical response ===
The film received mostly positive reviews from film critics. Review aggregator website Rotten Tomatoes gave Never Forever an 80% approval rating, based on 20 reviews, with an average rating of 6.7/10.

G. Allen Johnson of the San Francisco Chronicle wrote of Farmiga's performance in the film, "Vera Farmiga is the best American actress you've never heard of." Frank Scheck of The Hollywood Reporter wrote, "Farmiga elevates the material of this melodramatic soaper into something nearly profound."

Gary Goldstein of the Los Angeles Times wrote, "If Adrian Lyne directed a racy Lifetime movie, then asked Danielle Steel what to call it, you'd pretty much have Never Forever, a sudsy chamber piece that's engrossing despite its many plot holes and contrivances. The film's chief calling card is star Vera Farmiga. Her Sophie Lee is a buttoned-up suburban housewife whose inability to conceive with her sterile, Korean-American lawyer husband, Andrew (David Lee McInnis), drives her to commit a daring act of self-sacrifice. It's a quietly effective portrayal that uniquely balances restraint and abandon – often at the same moment." Stephen Holden of The New York Times wrote, "A fearless performance by Vera Farmiga, and glowing cinematography that explores the subtly shifting body language of strangers who are having sex but avoiding intimacy, partly camouflage the awkward storytelling of Gina Kim's marital melodrama Never Forever... But while Never Forever lingers in the thick of sex, lies and anxiety, it is something to see."

=== Accolades ===
Year	Award	Category	Recipient(s)	Result
2007	Deauville Film Festival	Grand Special Prize	Gina Kim	Nominated
2007	Deauville Film Festival	Special Jury Prize	Gina Kim	Won
2007	Sundance Film Festival	Grand Jury Prize	Gina Kim	Nominated
2008	Grand Bell Awards	Best New Director	Gina Kim	Nominated
