= The Opportunists =

- Theatrical release poster
- Directed by: Myles Connell
- Written by: Myles Connell
- Produced by: Tim Perrell; John Lyons
- Starring: Christopher Walken; Peter McDonald; Cyndi Lauper; Donal Logue; Vera Farmiga; José Zúñiga; Tom Noonan
- Cinematography: Teodoro Maniaci
- Edited by: Andy Keir
- Music by: Kurt Hoffman
- Production companies: Flashpoint; Eureka Pictures; Prosperity Pictures
- Distributed by: Overseas Filmgroup; Two Left Shoes Films
- Release dates: December 6, 1999 (Noir in Festival); August 11, 2000 (United States)
- Running time: 90 minutes
- Countries: United Kingdom; United States
- Languages: English; Polish
- Box office: $584,054

The Opportunists is a 1999 British-American crime drama film, written and directed by Myles Connell, and starring Christopher Walken, Cyndi Lauper, Donal Logue, and Vera Farmiga. The film takes place in the urban setting of Greenpoint, Brooklyn, in New York City. It was released in United States theaters on August 11, 2000.

== Plot ==
Victor "Vic" Kelly (Christopher Walken) is a struggling auto mechanic with a safe-cracking past and a lot of debt. When a supposed cousin from Ireland visits Vic, the alleged cousin sabotages one of Vic's auto repair jobs, to ensure Vic's desperation and participation in the robbery scheme introduced to Vic by neighborhood resident Pat (Donal Logue).

Vic is too stubbornly proud to accept a loan from his bar-owner girlfriend Sally (Cyndi Lauper), who offers Vic money that she was otherwise planning to use to renovate and remodel her neighborhood bar. Vic agrees to the robbery scheme, and goes to the armored courier service posing as a potential customer.

Given a view of the facility, including being shown the triple combination-lock vault, Vic then goes to work on practicing his safecracking skills for the big day. The auto mechanic takes one last shot at the lucrative robbery with his Irish cohort to pay off his debts. We find out the cousin is not really a cousin. Vic becomes locked in the vault, while the fake cousin takes a bag of cash and makes his escape from the scene.

The Irish cohort has a change of heart and returns with a bag of cash taken from Vic at the scene at the crime. Vic can now afford to keep his elderly aunt in her retirement home. There's enough money for Vic to be a good guy and give a cut to the two guards, who were in on the robbery with Vic, and had gotten fired. And Vic buys a juke box as a gift for his girlfriend's remodeled bar.

A second bag of cash is taken from the vault by the armoured-courrier service owner, who will report all the cash missing, and make false insurance and IRS claims. To protect his own scheme, the owner refuses to press charges against Vic. Vic finally experiences a bit of good luck for once in his life. The movie ends with Vic walking back to his girlfriend.

== Cast ==
- Christopher Walken as Victor "Vic" Kelly
- Peter McDonald as Mikey Lawler
- Donal Logue as Pat Duffy
- Vera Farmiga as Miriam Kelly
- John Ortiz as Ismael Espinoza
- Tom Noonan as Mort Stein
- Cyndi Lauper as Sally Mahon

== Reception ==
=== Box office ===
In its opening weekend in the United States, The Opportunists made $46,967 from 5 theaters, giving a per theater average of $9,393. The film made a further $537,087 for a total domestic gross of $584,054.

=== Critical response ===
The Opportunists received mostly positive reviews from film critics. On Metacritic, the film received a 71 out of 100 rating, based on 24 critical reviews, indicating "generally favorable reviews". Review aggregator website Rotten Tomatoes gave the film an approval rating of 54%, based on 28 reviews, with an average rating of 5.7/10. Elvis Mitchell of The New York Times wrote: "Myles Connell, who wrote and directed the picture, gives it the sleepy pace of a late fall day when the biggest event turns out to be waiting to see if the sun will break through the gray haze. The film has the ambience of a real neighborhood, but Mr. Connell can't seem to give it substance. Sometimes it seems to be fading away in front of your eyes."

Roger Ebert of the Chicago Sun-Times wrote: "Crime movies always seem to have neat endings. There's a chase or a shootout, a trial or a confession. "The Opportunists" is messier than that. It is less a matter of the big payoff than the daily struggle. In the movies, most safecrackers are egotistical geniuses who do it for the gratification. In life, I imagine they're more like Victor Kelly, and they're in it for the money. Not much money at that." Owen Gleiberman of Entertainment Weekly, gave a mixed review, writing: "The Opportunists is skillfully made, yet the film would have been better if it had tapped a bit of that Walken madness to bust out of its drab, poky little-people symmetries."

=== Accolades ===
Year	Award	Category	Recipient	Result
2000	Casting Society of America	Best Casting for a Feature Film – Independent	Kathleen Chopin	Nominated
2000	Gotham Award	Open Palm Award	Myles Connell	Nominated
