= The Escape (2016 film) =

- Promotional poster
- Directed by: Neill Blomkamp
- Written by: David Carter; Neill Blomkamp
- Produced by: Eric Stern; Aristides McGarry; Brian Dilorenzo
- Starring: Clive Owen; Jon Bernthal; Dakota Fanning; Vera Farmiga
- Cinematography: Mannie Ferreira
- Edited by: Julian Clarke; Austyn Daines; Devin Maurer
- Music by: Kristopher Pooley
- Production companies: BMW Films; Anonymous Content; Geisel Productions
- Distributed by: BMW Films
- Release date: October 23, 2016
- Running time: 11 minutes
- Country: United States
- Language: English

The Escape is a 2016 American short action film produced by BMW to promote the car manufacturer's 2017 5 Series. It was directed and co-written by Neill Blomkamp, and stars Clive Owen, Jon Bernthal, Dakota Fanning, and Vera Farmiga.

== Plot ==
After the disappearance of geneticist Dr. Nora Phillips and the exposure of the Molecular Genetics company's illegal activities in human cloning, the FBI raids the facility to arrest its key people. One surviving specimen, Lily, is escorted by a ruthless mercenary gunman named Holt to be delivered to an unnamed customer who bought the specimen.

The Driver is hired to transport the package with Holt "babysitting" him, ordering the hired driver to evade the FBI forces. En route to delivering Lily, the Driver develops a strong dislike for Holt's violent and inhuman treatment of Lily as an object rather than a human being. The Driver kicks the mercenary out of the car by subduing him and holding him at gunpoint. Holt pursues the Driver and tries to stop the car with a sniper rifle via helicopter, but the Driver incapacitates Holt's comrades and leaves him in the middle of the road to be arrested by the FBI, after a long and intense chase.

Eventually, the Driver delivers Lily to the extraction point where she informs him that Dr. Phillips created her and three others, who are now gone. She is surprised to learn that the customer is Dr. Phillips, who takes maternal custody of her.

== Cast ==
- Clive Owen as Driver
- Jon Bernthal as Holt
- Dakota Fanning as Lily
- Vera Farmiga as Dr. Nora Phillips

== Production ==
The short was filmed over the course of one-and-a-half months during summer of 2016 in Toronto, Ontario. Visual effects were completed in September 2016, ready for release the following month.

== Release ==
The film, which continues the plot of BMW's series of adverts titled The Hire, was posted on BMW USA's YouTube channel on October 23, 2016.
