= Special Correspondents =

2016 film

- Official poster
- Directed by: Ricky Gervais
- Written by: Ricky Gervais
- Based on: Envoyés très spéciaux by Simon Michaël & Jacques Labib
- Produced by: Chris Coen; Aaron L. Gilbert; Ricky Gervais; Ted Sarandos; Manuel Munz; Larry Sanitsky
- Starring: Ricky Gervais; Eric Bana; Vera Farmiga; Kevin Pollak; Kelly Macdonald; Benjamin Bratt; America Ferrera; Raúl Castillo
- Cinematography: Terry Stacey
- Edited by: Nicolas Chaudeurge
- Music by: Dickon Hinchliffe
- Production companies: Bron Studios; Unanimous Entertainment
- Distributed by: Netflix
- Release dates: 22 April 2016 (Tribeca); 29 April 2016 (Worldwide)
- Running time: 100 minutes
- Countries: Canada; United States
- Language: English

Special Correspondents is a 2016 satirical comedy film written, directed by and produced by Ricky Gervais. The film stars Gervais, Eric Bana, Vera Farmiga, Kelly Macdonald, Kevin Pollak, Benjamin Bratt, America Ferrera and Raúl Castillo. The film had its world premiere at the Tribeca Film Festival on 22 April 2016 and was released worldwide by Netflix on 29 April 2016. The film follows two radio journalists who concoct a scheme to fake their kidnappings in South America.

The movie is a remake of the French film Envoyés très spéciaux.

== Plot ==
News radio journalist Frank Bonneville enters a murder scene posing as a cop. Getting the details of the crime, he is removed from the premises and, immediately reports the story live on the radio. Upon returning to the station, he is applauded by colleagues on getting the story first, but his boss Geoffrey Mallard warns that if he breaks the law one more time, he'll be fired.

That night, everyman Ian Finch, also Frank's sound technician, takes his wife Eleanor to the station's annual ball, but must leave for a stake-out with co-worker Claire Maddox. Eleanor then meets Frank, who sleeps with her, unaware she is Finch's wife. The next day, Mallard puts Frank (and Finch) on a story about an uprising in Ecuador.

At first, Finch declines because he needs to try to save his marriage, but he later changes his mind. At the airport, they realize Finch has accidentally thrown their passports and plane tickets in a garbage truck. They return to the city and hide out at a café owned by Spanish couple Brigida and Domingo, located across from the radio station. With their help, Frank and Finch fake the war reports in their spare room.

After Finch and Frank decide the story needs to be bigger, they invent a man named Emilio Santiago Alvarez, who is elusive and closely linked to the war. The report alerts Washington, who now fear that Frank and Finch are targets for Alvarez's men. Meanwhile, Frank and Finch watch as other media outlets report on Alvarez, including their TV rival John Baker. Mallard calls Frank, telling them to go to the U.S. embassy in Quito, to be flown home. Panicking that they'll be found out, Frank and Finch destroy their SIM cards to not be traced.

The next morning, Frank fails to check in with Mallard, worrying the station. The media begins reporting on their 'disappearance'. Claire visits Eleanor to offer sympathy, but she seems more interested in getting her story out. Frank and Finch stage a hostage situation, and send a message to the President, demanding a ransom or they will be killed. Later, Frank and Finch watch as Eleanor appears on TV, so Frank finally realises she's Finch's wife. She then performs a song, "Dollar for a Hero", calling for their safe return.

Eleanor subsequently becomes a national sensation, setting up a charity for Finch and Frank. Mallard asks Claire to get to know her, who is using her husband's plight to start a singing career. Finch accepts Eleanor's selfishness, saying he's no longer upset she left him. On his birthday, he admits he can't keep up the charade any longer. Finch and Frank stop off at his apartment to take some of the donated money, but are caught by Eleanor. The three decide to split the cash so everyone can get what they want. The men drive, then sail illegally to Ecuador. They hitch a ride to Quito from a local, stopping first at a rundown bar. There, they are kidnapped and taken to a small village, where they are locked up. Thinking they're going to die, Frank admits he slept with Eleanor.

The next morning, the captors demand ransom from Eleanor but she refuses, telling them to kill Frank and Finch. When a captor returns, planning for them to fight to the death, Frank steals his gun and Finch shoots him. They escape stealing a car, make it to the U.S. embassy, and are flown home by private jet. On their return, they are greeted by the Secretary of State, press, friends and family. Frank makes a speech, and Finch bypasses Eleanor to greet Domingo and Brigida. Eleanor then speaks to the press about her upcoming album, as Finch takes off his wedding ring. He approaches Claire, who he realizes likes him for who he is. The pair happily walk off towards the city together.

== Cast ==
- Eric Bana as Frank Bonneville
- Ricky Gervais as Ian Finch
- Vera Farmiga as Eleanor Finch
- Kelly Macdonald as Claire Maddox
- Benjamin Bratt as John Baker
- Kevin Pollak as Geoffrey Mallard
- America Ferrera as Brigida
- Raúl Castillo as Domingo
- Ari Cohen as Rampling
- Meghan Heffern as Virginia
- Mimi Kuzyk as Secretary of State
- Jim Norton as Rent Boy
- Rachael Ancheril as Bar Girl
- Kelly McCormack as Station Accountant

== Production ==
=== Pre-production ===
In late October 2014, it was reported that Ricky Gervais would be directing a film titled Special Correspondents, from his own screenplay. It was also announced that Eric Bana and Gervais would star in the film as a struggling radio journalist and his sidekick, respectively. In early May, it was reported that Kevin Pollak would have a supporting role in the film. On 27 May, it was revealed that Benjamin Bratt had been cast in the role of Bana's nemesis. On 30 May, Kelly Macdonald was reported to have joined the cast of the film. The following day, Vera Farmiga announced her involvement in the project; she was later confirmed to be portraying the role of Gervais' ruthless wife. Raúl Castillo was reported to have joined the cast on 3 June. A picture of the complete cast was revealed by TheWrap on 5 June, confirming the casting of America Ferrera.

=== Filming ===
Filming began for Special Correspondents on 19 May 2015 in Toronto, Ontario, Canada. Production moved from Toronto to New York City on 27 June. Principal photography was completed in New York on 2 July 2015.

=== Post-production ===
Gervais stated when he had picture locked the film, "Even though it would certainly be billed as a comedy, it's not a big broad loud obvious one...It's a bit satirical. A bit dramatic. A bit romantic." In September 2015, Gervais posted on his blog they had begun recording and writing the score for the film. On 6 November 2015, Gervais announced that he had finished post-production on the film. In February 2016, it was announced that Dickon Hinchliffe had composed the score.

== Distribution ==
=== Marketing ===
On the same day as the film's release date was announced, four stills from Special Correspondents were released, featuring the characters of Eric Bana, Ricky Gervais, Vera Farmiga, Kelly Macdonald, America Ferrera, and Raúl Castillo. Gervais debuted the first official trailer on his Twitter account on 23 March 2016. A second trailer was released on 12 April 2016.

=== Release ===
In November 2014, it was reported that Sony Pictures Worldwide Acquisitions had purchased the rights to the film for territories including the UK, Australia, New Zealand, South Africa, and Latin America. In April 2015, it was announced that Netflix had pre-bought the global distribution rights to the film for roughly $12 million. Special Correspondents received its world premiere at the Tribeca Film Festival on 22 April 2016, followed by an audience discussion with Gervais, Bana and additional cast members. The film was released worldwide on 29 April 2016.

== Reception ==
On Rotten Tomatoes the film holds an approval rating of 16% based on 37 reviews, with an average rating of 3.9/10. The site's critical consensus reads: "Feeble writing and two-dimensional characters make Special Correspondents an unsuccessful, embarrassing endeavor for creator Ricky Gervais." Metacritic gives the film a weighted average score of 36 out of 100, based on 14 critics, indicating "generally unfavorable reviews".

Nick Schager of Variety gave the film a negative review, writing, "Ricky Gervais has yet to find another role as perfectly suited to his caustic sensibilities as The Office boss David Brent – or, for that matter, the impishly nasty, trash-talking persona he assumes for his Golden Globes hosting gigs. Special Correspondents doesn't halt that streak, affording him a loser-makes-good part that's as toothless as the rest of the film, about a cocky New York City news radio reporter and meek sound technician who unwittingly fake their way into the national spotlight."
