= The Barrow Group =

Performing arts group

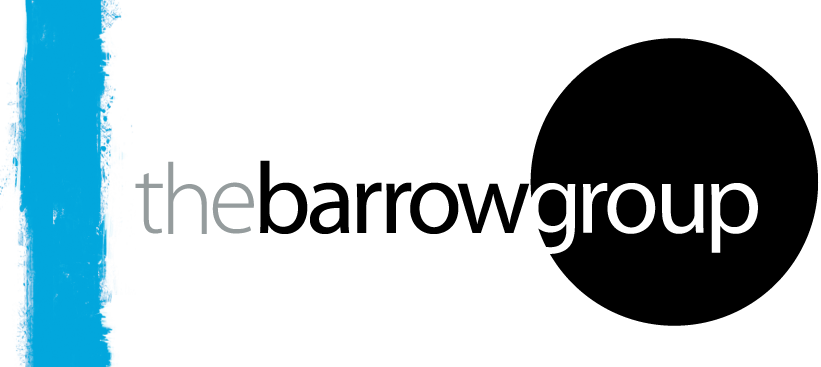
The Barrow Group logo

The Barrow Group is a non-profit performing arts group located in New York City focused on empowering actors, writers, and directors through simple, clear, spontaneous storytelling. The company prioritizes accessibility, diversity, and excellence, and its programming includes off-Broadway productions, artist development workshops and readings, and performing arts training for beginners, professionals, and youth.

Seth Barrish and Lee Brock, a married couple, act as Co-Artistic Directors of the company.

The Barrow Group was founded in 1986 by an ensemble of actors and directors, all of whom shared a desire to produce meaningful plays using a highly naturalistic, intimate mode of performance. The organization has received awards for its productions including a Drama Desk Award, a Lucille Lortel Awards, an OBIE Award, and a nomination for a Pulitzer Prize. Training program alumni include Anne Hathaway, Tony Hale, Alison Wright, Michael Stahl-David, Zach Booth and Poorna Jagannathan.

The company runs its operations from 520 8th Ave in Manhattan, where it operates five studios and a theater. Executive Director Robert Serrell successfully turned the company around after the Great Recession in 2008, and the company has grown from serving 320 students per year to over 3,600. The Barrow Group has a partnership with Quinnipiac University.
