= Gina Kim (filmmaker) =

South Korean filmmaker and academic

- Born: 1973 (age 52–53); Seoul, South Korea
- Occupations: film director, film producer, screenwriter, professor
- Years active: 1995–Present

Korean name
- Hangul: 김진아
- RR: Gim Jina
- MR: Kim China

Gina Kim (born 1973) is a South Korean filmmaker, artist, and professor based in Seoul and Los Angeles, whose work spans feature films, virtual reality, and media art. She is known for exploring themes of embodiment, memory, gender, and transnational identity. Her films have screened at major international festivals including Venice, Berlin, Cannes, and Sundance, and her works have been exhibited at major art institutions such as the Museum of Modern Art, the Centre Pompidou, and the Smithsonian Institution.

Kim previously taught at Harvard University where she received the Excellence in Teaching Award, and is currently a professor at the UCLA School of Theater, Film, and Television.

== Early life ==
Kim received her Bachelor of Fine Arts degree from Seoul National University in 1996 before moving to the United States to attend the California Institute of the Arts where she received her Masters of Fine Arts in 1999.

== Career ==
=== 1995–2003: Early work ===
Kim began making short experimental films as early as 1995, before completing her first feature length documentary, Gina Kim's Video Diary (2002). After moving to the US from Korea, Kim suffered from intense isolation and anorexia, and the film is a culmination of documented personal footage from this time. Part video performance, part personal diary, the film was shot over a six year period, and is a confessional self-portrait exploring themes of identity, self-representation, bodily experience, and the filmmaker’s internal struggles. It was described by film scholar Scott MacDonald as “a subtle, often troubling, generally exquisite... coming-of-age story.” The experimental documentary premiered at the Berlin International Film Festival's Forum in 2003, and has since been recognized in publications on personal documentary and avant-garde cinema.

Her narrative feature debut, Invisible Light (2003), explores the experiences of two Korean and Korean-American women and was noted for its visual rigor. It won the special award at the 2004 Seoul Women's Film Festival, and has been screened at more than 23 film festivals and in over 15 countries. It was also listed among Film Comment’s “Ten Best Films" lists of 2003.

=== 2007–2013: Feature films and international co-productions ===
==== Feature films ====
Kim's third feature, Never Forever (2007), starred Vera Farmiga and Ha Jung-woo and was the first co-production between the U.S. and Korea. It was produced by acclaimed Korean director, Lee Chang-dong, with music by Michael Nyman, and explores themes of race, class, gender, and sexuality. Variety Magazine described it as "a chamber piece of hushed eroticism and surprising narrative grip." The film premiered at the Sundance Film Festival and won the Jury Prize at the 2007 Deauville American Film Festival.

In 2009, she directed Faces of Seoul, a documentary and video essay about the transformation of the South Korean capital city of Seoul. It premiered at the Venice Film Festival, and she was named as one of the "Talents of Venice" by L'Uomo Vogue. The film was later adapted into a multilingual photobook and accompanying film called Séoul, Visages d'une Ville, published by L'atelier des Cahiers.

Her 2013 feature, Final Recipe, starring Michelle Yeoh and Henry Lau, premiered at the 2014 Berlin Film Festival, where it opened the festival's Culinary Cinema section. The film continues a lineage with her both in transnational themes within her movies as well as international co-productions, this time among China, Korea, Thailand, Singapore, and the U.S. The film was released theatrically across multiple continents, including screenings in over 3,000 theaters in China. The Hollywood Reporter praised it for “creating a non-exotic piece out of a territory-trotting narrative, where every place is made to seem like home.”

==== Festival jury participation ====
Kim served on the jury for the 66th Venice Film Festival and the Asian Pacific Screen Awards in 2009.

=== 2017–present: Immersive and virtual reality ===
Since 2017, Kim has developed a trilogy of virtual reality works exploring the history of Korean female sex workers serving U.S. military bases in Korea. The films are Bloodless (2017), Tearless (2020), and Comfortless (2023)—collectively known as the Comfortless Trilogy. Each film was shot on location of where the histories took place.

==== Bloodless (2017) ====
Bloodless reconstructs the final hours of a South Korean sex worker who was murdered by a U.S. soldier in 1992. The film won Best V.R. Story at the 74th Venice International Film Festival, Best V.R. Film at the Thessaloniki International Film Festival, and Best Virtual Reality Short at the Bogotá Short Film Festival.

==== Tearless (2020) ====
Tearless examines a medical facility, known by locals as "Monkey House", established in the 1970s by the South Korean government and run by the U.S. military in a city north of Seoul, Dongducheon. In this building, sex workers suspected of carrying STDs were treated and detained. Tearless was awarded the Reflet d'Or for the best immersive work at the 27th Geneva International Film Festival.

==== Comfortless (2023) ====
The final film in the trilogy, Comfortless, depicts a 500-residential unit brothel, named "American Town", which was established for the U.S. Air Force Base in Kusan, South Korea, during its height in the 1980s. The V.R. film premiered at Venice International Film Festival in 2023, and was accompanied by augmented and extended reality projects that digitally reconstructed the historical site.

== Retrospectives and exhibitions ==
Kim has been the subject of retrospectives and exhibitions worldwide, including:

- Gina Kim: Desire & Diaspora; A Retrospective, Neues asiatisches Kino (Munich, 2019)
- Remembering Oblivion: The Immersive Cinema of Gina Kim, Seoul International Women’s Film Festival (Seoul, 2022)
- COMFORTLESS di Gina Kim, Festival Internazionale di Cinema Dal (Milan, 2023)
- Your Silence Is a Mirror: Gina Kim VR Trilogy, Korean Film Archive (Seoul, 2023)
- Gina Kim’s US Military Comfort Women Trilogy, CinemAsia Film Festival (Amsterdam, 2024)
- Transport to Another World, National Museum of Modern and Contemporary Art, Korea (Seoul, 2024–25)
- Faces of Seoul (Gina Kim, 2009) + virtual Q&A w/ filmmaker, Duke University (Durham, N.C. 2025)

Her work has also been shown at MoMA, the Centre Pompidou, and the Smithsonian Institution.

== Academic career ==
Between 2004–2007 and 2013–2014, Kim taught film production and theory classes at Harvard University, the first Asian woman to do so. In 2005, during her tenure there, she curated the series "Visions from the South: South Korean Films from 1960–2005" at the Harvard Film Archive. As acknowledgment of special contribution to the teaching of undergraduates at Harvard College, she was awarded a Certificate of Teaching Excellence from Harvard University in October 2014.

Kim became a professor at the UCLA School of Theater, Film and Television in 2017, and in 2018, she was listed as one of the "Top Teachers in Film, TV and more" by Variety magazine out of ten teachers from around the world.

== Archival legacy ==
Kim’s films and media works are currently being preserved by the UCLA Film & Television Archive. Her immersive media works are archived jointly by UCLA and LACMA.

== Selected filmography ==
=== Feature films ===
Year	Title	Director	Writer	Producer
2002	Gina Kim's Video Diary	Yes	Yes	
2003	Invisible Light	Yes	Yes	Yes
2007	Never Forever	Yes	Yes	
2009	Faces of Seoul	Yes	Yes	
2013	Final Recipe	Yes	Yes	Yes

=== Virtual reality works ===
- Bloodless (2017)
- Tearless (2020)
- Comfortless (2023)

=== Extended/Augmented reality projects ===
- The Augmented Reality of Monkey House
- The Extended Reality of Monkey House
- The Extended Reality of American Town

=== Short films ===
Year	Title
1995	Heroine (short)
1995	Ok Man, This Is Your World (short)
1995	The Picture I Draw (short)
1995	Passing Eyes (short)
1996	Walking (short)
1997	Door (short)
1998	Flying Appetite (short)
1999	Empty House (short)
2001	Morning Becomes Eclectic (short)

== Awards and recognition ==
- Jury Prize, Deauville American Film Festival (2007) – Never Forever
- Best VR Story, Venice International Film Festival (2017) – Bloodless
- Listed by The Hollywood Reporter as one of “Five South Korean Talents to Watch” at Cannes Film Festival (2018)
- Named by Variety Magazine as one of ten international teachers listed in their “Top Teachers in Film, TV and more” list (2018)
- Best Immersive Work, Geneva International Film Festival (2021) – Tearless
- Awards at Thessaloniki, Bogotá, and others for VR work
- International Visual Sociology Association Award for Visual Activism (2022)

== See also ==
- List of female film and television directors
- Korean cinema
- Feminist film theory
