= The Psychedelic Furs discography =

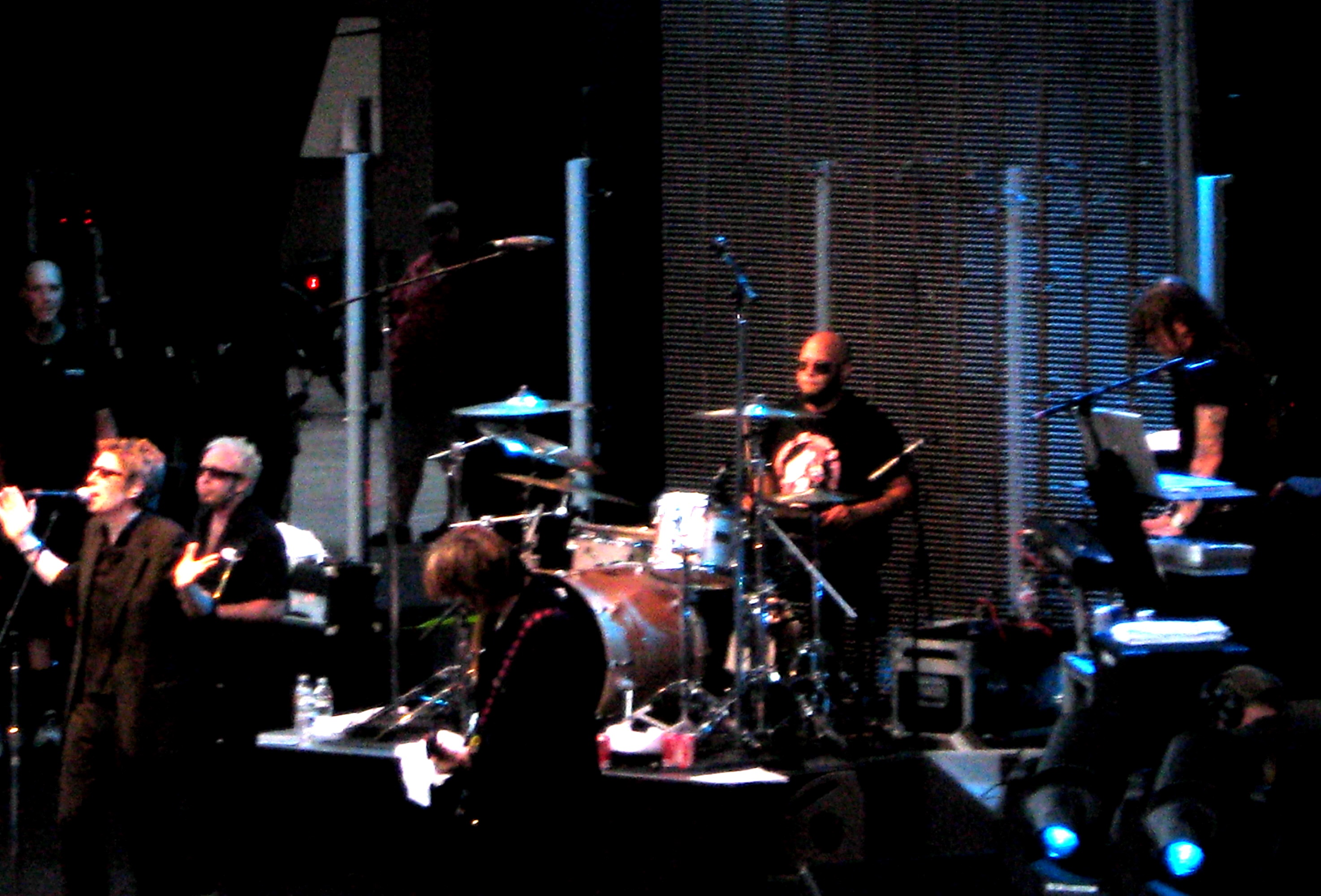
- The Psychedelic Furs performing at Pacific Amphitheatre in 2008
- Studio albums: 8
- Live albums: 2
- Compilation albums: 6
- Singles: 23
- Video albums: 2

The discography of the English rock band the Psychedelic Furs consists of eight studio albums, 22 singles, six compilation albums, and two live albums.

The Psychedelic Furs formed in 1977 and released their eponymous debut studio album in 1980. It reached number 18 on the UK Albums Chart and number 140 on the US Billboard 200. The band's second album, Talk Talk Talk, followed in 1981. It reached the top 10 of the charts in New Zealand and contained the band's first two charting UK singles, "Dumb Waiters" and "Pretty in Pink". The band released its third album, Forever Now, in 1982. It featured the single "Love My Way", which nearly reached the top 40 in both the US and the UK.

Mirror Moves, the band's fourth album, was released in 1984 and peaked at number 15 in the UK and number 43 in the US. It included the charting singles "Heaven", "The Ghost in You", and "Heartbeat". In 1986, the band re-recorded "Pretty in Pink" for the soundtrack to the film of the same name, leaving them poised for their highest-profile release, 1987's Midnight to Midnight, which peaked at number 12 in the UK and number 29 in the US, thus becoming the highest-charting album of the band's career. This was followed the next year with the band's first "hits" compilation, All of This and Nothing, and the single "All That Money Wants".

The Furs released the studio albums: Book of Days in 1989, and World Outside in 1991, then quietly went on hiatus while singer Richard Butler began work on a solo project which evolved into the band Love Spit Love. The Psychedelic Furs reformed in 2000 and have continued to tour and perform ever since. In 2001, they released Beautiful Chaos: Greatest Hits Live, which also featured one new studio recording, "Alive (For Once in My Lifetime)", as well as a DVD version of the performance, titled Live from the House of Blues. The band released Made of Rain, their eighth studio album, and first in 29 years, on 31 July 2020. It was preceded by the single "Don't Believe".

== Albums ==
=== Studio albums ===
Title	Album details	Peak chart positions										Certifications
Title	Album details	UK	AUS	CAN	GER	NZ	SWE	SCO	SPA	SWI	US	Certifications
The Psychedelic Furs	Released: February 1980; Label: Columbia	18	—	—	—	—	—	—	—	—	140	
Talk Talk Talk	Released: May 1981; Label: Columbia	30	—	—	—	8	—	—	—	—	89	
Forever Now	Released: September 1982; Label: Columbia	20	49	83	—	4	35	—	—	—	61	RIAA: Gold
Mirror Moves	Released: May 1984; Label: Columbia	15	97	16	—	5	26	—	—	—	43	MC: Gold; RIAA: Gold
Midnight to Midnight	Released: February 1987; Label: Columbia	12	38	16	—	20	18	—	—	—	29	BPI: Silver; MC: Gold
Book of Days	Released: October 1989; Label: Columbia	74	114	—	—	—	—	—	—	—	138	
World Outside	Released: July 1991; Label: Columbia	68	108	—	—	—	—	—	—	—	—	
Made of Rain	Released: 31 July 2020; Label: Cooking Vinyl	13	—	—	47	—	6	5	62	41	12	
"—" denotes releases that did not chart.

=== Live albums ===
Title	Details
Radio One Sessions	Released: June 1999; Label: Strange Fruit; Recorded: 1979–1981, 1990
Beautiful Chaos: Greatest Hits Live	Released: November 2001; Label: Sony; Recorded: 2001

=== Compilation albums ===
Title	Album details	Peak chart positions		
Title	Album details	UK	SCO	US
All of This and Nothing	Released: August 1988; Label: Columbia	67	—	102
Here Came the Psychedelic Furs: B-Sides and Lost Grooves	Released: October 1994; Label: Columbia	—	—	—
In the Pink	Released: May 1996; Label: Sony	—	—	—
Should God Forget: A Retrospective	Released: October 1997; Label: Columbia	—	—	—
Greatest Hits	Released: January 2001; Label: Columbia	—	—	—
Superhits	Released: September 2003; Label: Sony	—	—	—
Original Album Classics	Released: 2008; Label: Sony/Columbia/Legacy	—	—	—
The Best of the Psychedelic Furs	Released: 2009; Label:	— (Note: The Best of the Psychedelic Furs did not enter the UK Albums Chart, but peaked at number 81 on the UK Album Sales Chart.)	97	—
Playlist: The Very Best of the Psychedelic Furs	Released: May 2011; Label: Sony Music Entertainment	—	—	—
"—" denotes releases that did not chart.

=== Video albums ===
Title	Details
All of This and Nothing	Released: August 1988; Label: Sony; Format: VHS
Live from House of Blues	Released: October 2001; Label: Pioneer; Format: DVD, VHS

== Singles ==
Title	Year	Peak chart positions								Album
Title	Year	UK	AUS	CAN	NZ	US	US Alt.	US Dance	US Main.	Album
"We Love You"	1979	— (Note: "We Love You" did not enter the UK Singles Chart, but peaked at number 10 on the UK Physical Singles Chart in 2018.)	—	—	—	—	—	77	—	The Psychedelic Furs
"Sister Europe"	1980	—	100	—	47	—	—	—	—	The Psychedelic Furs
"Mr. Jones"	1980	—	—	—	—	—	—	—	—	Talk Talk Talk
"Dumb Waiters"	1981	59	—	—	—	—	—	27	—	Talk Talk Talk
"Pretty in Pink"	1981	43	—	—	—	—	—	—	—	Talk Talk Talk
"Love My Way"	1982	42	23	—	9	44	—	40	30	Forever Now
"Danger"	1982	—	—	—	—	—	—	—	—	Forever Now
"Run and Run"	1983	—	—	—	—	—	—	—	—	Forever Now
"Heaven"	1984	29	—	—	41	—	—	—	—	Mirror Moves
"The Ghost in You"	1984	68	—	85	32	59	—	—	25	Mirror Moves
"Here Come Cowboys"	1984	—	—	—	—	—	—	—	—	Mirror Moves
"Heartbeat"	1984	62	—	—	—	—	—	4	—	Mirror Moves
"Pretty in Pink" (Note: "Pretty in Pink" (re-recorded version) was also included a bonus track on some editions of Midnight to Midnight.) (re-recorded version)	1986	18	—	61	—	41	—	—	—	Pretty in Pink soundtrack
"Heartbreak Beat"	1987	79	26	78	23	26	—	14	11	Midnight to Midnight
"Angels Don't Cry"	1987	85	—	—	—	—	—	—	—	Midnight to Midnight
"Shock"	1987	—	—	—	—	—	—	30	—	Midnight to Midnight
"All That Money Wants"	1988	75	—	—	—	—	1	—	—	All of This and Nothing
"Should God Forget"	1989	—	—	—	—	—	8	—	—	Book of Days
"House"	1990	92	—	—	—	—	1	—	—	Book of Days
"Until She Comes"	1991	89	146	—	—	—	1	—	—	World Outside
"Don't Be a Girl"	1991	—	—	—	—	—	13	—	—	World Outside
"Alive (For Once in My Lifetime)"	2001	—	—	—	—	—	—	—	—	Beautiful Chaos: Greatest Hits Live
"Don't Believe"	2020	—	—	—	—	—	—	—	—	Made of Rain
"You'll Be Mine"	2020	—	—	—	—	—	—	—	—	Made of Rain
"Wrong Train"	2021	—	—	—	—	—	—	—	—	Made of Rain
"Evergreen"	2021	—	—	—	—	—	—	—	—	Non-album single
"—" denotes releases that did not chart or were not released in that country.

== Music videos ==
- "We Love You" (1980)
- "Sister Europe" (1980)
- "Pretty in Pink" (1981)
- "Dumb Waiters" (1981)
- "Love My Way" (1982)
- "Sleep Comes Down" (1982)
- "Run and Run" (1983)
- "Danger" (1983)
- "Heaven" (1984)
- "The Ghost in You" (1984)
- "Here Come Cowboys" (1984)
- "Pretty in Pink" (1986)
- "Heartbreak Beat" (1987)
- "Angels Don't Cry" (1987)
- "All That Money Wants" (1988)
- "House" (1990)
- "Until She Comes" (1991)
- "Don't Be a Girl" (1991)
- "Alive (For Once in My Lifetime)" (2001)
- "Come All Ye Faithful" (2020)
- "Wrong Train" (2021)
