= All of This and Nothing =

Greatest hits album by the Psychedelic Furs
- Released: 1 August 1988
- Genre: Post-punk, new wave
- Length: 63:57
- Label: Columbia
- Producer: The Psychedelic Furs, Keith Forsey, Chris Kimsey, Steve Lillywhite, Todd Rundgren, Phil Thornalley

The Psychedelic Furs chronology
Midnight to Midnight (1987)	All of This and Nothing (1988)	Book of Days (1989)

All of This and Nothing is the first compilation album by the English rock band the Psychedelic Furs, released in the U.K. August 1, 1988 by Columbia Records. The album has 14 songs, including one — "All That Money Wants" — recorded specifically for the collection.

== Critical reception ==
Professional ratings
Review scores
Source	Rating
AllMusic	4.5/5 stars
Robert Christgau	A
Record Mirror	4/5 stars
Rolling Stone	4.5/5 stars

AllMusic writer Michael Sutton said the album "effectively summarizes the Psychedelic Furs' evolution from a left-of-center British rock band to a stylish alternative pop act". A Rolling Stone review was critical of the album for omitting too many of the band's early singles, such as "Run and Run" and "Into You Like a Train", though it called All of This and Nothing their best album to include "The Ghost in You" and "Heaven".

== Track listing ==
1. "President Gas" (John Ashton, Richard Butler, Tim Butler, Vince Ely) - 5:16
2. "All That Money Wants" (Ashton, R. Butler, T. Butler) - 3:46
3. "Imitation of Christ" (Ashton, R. Butler, T. Butler, Ely, Duncan Kilburn, Roger Morris) - 5:29
4. "Sister Europe" (Ashton, R. Butler, T. Butler, Ely, Kilburn, Morris) - 5:41
5. "Love My Way" (Ashton, R. Butler, T. Butler, Ely) - 3:33
6. "No Easy Street" (Ashton, R. Butler, T. Butler, Ely) - 4:03
7. "Highwire Days" (Ashton, R. Butler) - 4:03
8. "She Is Mine" (Ashton, R. Butler, T. Butler, Ely, Kilburn, Morris) - 3:52
9. "Dumb Waiters" (Ashton, R. Butler, T. Butler, Ely, Kilburn, Morris) - 5:06
10. "Pretty in Pink" (Ashton, R. Butler, T. Butler, Ely, Kilburn, Morris) - 3:59
11. "The Ghost in You" (R. Butler, T. Butler) - 4:16
12. "Heaven" (R. Butler, T. Butler) - 3:27
13. "Heartbreak Beat" (Ashton, R. Butler, T. Butler) - 5:11
14. "All of This and Nothing" (Ashton, R. Butler, T. Butler, Ely, Kilburn, Morris) - 6:25

== Charts ==
The album peaked at No. 67 in the UK Albums Chart and No. 102 in the US Billboard 200 chart.

Album

Chart (1988)	Peak position
UK Albums Chart	67
US Billboard 200	102

Singles

Year	Single	Chart	Position
1988	"All That Money Wants"	UK Singles Chart	75
1988	"All That Money Wants"	US Billboard Modern Rock Tracks	1
