= Should God Forget: A Retrospective =

Compilation album by the Psychedelic Furs
- Released: 21 October 1997
- Recorded: 1979–1991
- Genre: Post-punk
- Length: 148:05
- Label: Legacy

The Psychedelic Furs chronology
In the Pink (1996)	Should God Forget: A Retrospective (1997)	Radio 1 Sessions (1999)

Professional ratings
Review scores
Source	Rating
AllMusic	4.5/5 stars
Robert Christgau	A−
Uncut	4/5 stars

Should God Forget: A Retrospective is a compilation album by the English rock band the Psychedelic Furs, released as a double CD in 1997 by Legacy Records.

== Track listing ==
=== Disc 1 ===
1. "India" – 6:22
2. "Sister Europe" – 5:39
3. "Pulse" – 2:39
4. "Mack the Knife" (Live) – 5:59
5. "Blacks/Radio" – 6:50
6. "We Love You" – 3:27
7. "Imitation of Christ" – 5:38
8. "Soap Commercial" (Live) – 3:50
9. "Pretty in Pink (Original Version)" – 3:58
10. "Mr. Jones" – 4:02
11. "Into You Like A Train" – 4:33
12. "I Wanna Sleep With You" – 3:17
13. "Merry Go Round (Yes I Do)" (U.K. Version) – 3:51
14. "President Gas" – 5:17
15. "Love My Way" – 3:33
16. "Sleep Comes Down" – 3:51
17. "I Don't Want to Be Your Shadow" – 3:48

=== Disc 2 ===
1. "Alice's House" (Alternate Version) – 4:16
2. "The Ghost in You" – 4:16
3. "Here Come Cowboys" – 3:56
4. "Heaven" – 3:26
5. "Highwire Days" – 4:08
6. "Heartbeat" (Live) – 5:03
7. "All of the Law" (Live) – 5:42
8. "Heartbreak Beat" – 5:14
9. "All That Money Wants" – 3:45
10. "Entertain Me" – 5:00
11. "Should God Forget" – 4:21
12. "Torch" – 4:48
13. "Get a Room" (Live) – 4:45
14. "Until She Comes" – 3:48
15. "All About You" – 4:17
16. "There's a World" – 4:46 (though it continues at the 5:15 mark with a hidden bonus track, an alternate version of "Dumb Waiters"
- Tracks 1-1, 1-2, 1-3, 1-6, 1-7 taken from The Psychedelic Furs.
- Track 1-5 taken from The Psychedelic Furs UK edition.
- Tracks 1-4, 1-8 taken from The Peel Sessions, BBC Radio, England. First BBC Broadcast June 18, 1980.
- Tracks 1-9, 1-10, 1-11, 1-12 taken from Talk Talk Talk.
- Track 1-13 taken from Forever Now UK edition.
- Tracks 1-14, 1-15, 1-16 taken from Forever Now.
- Track 1-17 taken from the B-side to "Love My Way" and Here Came The Psychedelic Furs: B-Sides & Lost Grooves.
- Track 2-1 is previously unreleased and recorded 1982 during the Forever Now sessions.
- Tracks 2-2, 2-3, 2-4, 2-5 taken from Mirror Moves.
- Tracks 2-6, 2-7 are previously unreleased and recorded 8/28/87 at the Greek, Berkeley, CA.
- Track 2-8 taken from Midnight To Midnight.
- Track 2-9 taken from All Of This And Nothing.
- Tracks 2-10, 2-11, 2-12 taken from Book Of Days.
- Track 2-13 is previously unreleased and recorded 11/13/91 at the Metro, Chicago, Il.
- Tracks 2-14, 2-15, 2-16 taken from World Outside.
