= Pretty in Pink =

1986 film by Howard Deutch

- Theatrical release poster
- Directed by: Howard Deutch
- Written by: John Hughes
- Produced by: Lauren Shuler
- Starring: Molly Ringwald; Harry Dean Stanton; Jon Cryer; Annie Potts; James Spader; Andrew McCarthy
- Cinematography: Tak Fujimoto
- Edited by: Richard Marks
- Music by: Michael Gore
- Distributed by: Paramount Pictures
- Release dates: January 29, 1986 (Mann's Chinese Theatre); February 28, 1986 (United States)
- Running time: 97 minutes
- Country: United States
- Language: English
- Budget: $9 million
- Box office: $40.5 million (US)

Pretty in Pink is a 1986 American teen romantic comedy drama film about love and social cliques in American high schools in the 1980s. The film stars Molly Ringwald, alongside Harry Dean Stanton, Jon Cryer, Annie Potts, James Spader, and Andrew McCarthy. A cult classic, it is commonly identified as a "Brat Pack" film. The film follows high school senior Andie Walsh (Ringwald), and her relationships with her love interest Blane McDonnagh (McCarthy), her best friend Philip F. "Duckie" Dale (Cryer), and her father (Stanton).

It was directed by Howard Deutch, produced by Lauren Shuler Donner, and written by John Hughes, who also served as co-executive producer. The film was named after a song by the Psychedelic Furs, and the film's soundtrack, which has been acclaimed as "among the most brilliant in modern cinema", features a re-recorded version of the song. Orchestral Manoeuvres in the Dark's "If You Leave" became an international hit and charted at number four on the US Billboard Hot 100 in May 1986.

Pretty in Pink premiered at Mann's Chinese Theatre on January 29, 1986, and was released theatrically in the United States on February 28, 1986 by Paramount Pictures. The film received generally positive reviews from critics, who praised Ringwald's performance, and grossed $40.5 million against a $9 million budget.

== Plot ==
High school senior Andie Walsh lives with her underemployed working-class father, Jack, in the Chicago suburb of Elgin. Her best friend, a fellow outsider named Philip "Duckie" Dale, is in love with her, but is afraid to tell her how he truly feels. In school, Duckie and Andie, along with their friends, are harassed and bullied by the arrogant "richie" and popular kids, specifically Benny Hanson and her boyfriend, Steff McKee, who finds Andie attractive and secretly resents having been rejected by her.

Andie works after school at Trax, a hip record store managed by the quirky thirty-something Iona. Andie starts talking about her school's senior prom to Iona, who advises her to go, despite not having a date. Blane McDonnagh, one of the preppy boys and Steff's best friend, falls for Andie and eventually asks her out.

On the night of the date, Andie waits for Blane at Trax, but he is late. Duckie enters and asks her to go out with him, but she ignores him. When Blane arrives, Duckie becomes upset and argues with Andie before storming off. Blane brings her to Steff's house party, where Andie is bullied by the rich partygoers. Andie then brings Blane to a local nightclub, where Iona is sitting with Duckie, who is hostile and jealous toward Blane.

After another argument with Duckie, Andie and Blane walk out of the club. She tells him she wants to go home, but refuses to let him bring her there, confessing she does not want him to see where she lives. Andie eventually allows Blane to drop her off, he asks her to the prom and they share their first kiss. Andie visits Iona the next day to talk about the date. Meanwhile, Blane, pressured by Steff, Benny, and rich friends, begins distancing himself from her.

Jack presents Andie with a pink dress that he has bought for her. However, they begin to argue because he has been lying about going to a full-time job. Jack breaks down, revealing that he is still bitter and depressed about his wife having left them.

At school, Andie confronts Blane for avoiding her and not returning her calls. When asked about the prom, he claims that he had already asked somebody else but had forgotten. Andie calls Blane a liar, saying he is ashamed of being seen with her as his rich friends will not approve.

Andie runs away as a teary-eyed Blane leaves, with Steff trashing her as he passes. Duckie overhears Steff and attacks him in the hallway. The two fight before teachers intervene. Andie goes to Iona, upset about what happened, and asks for her old prom dress.

Using the fabric from Iona's dress and the dress that her father had bought, Andie creates a pink prom dress. When she arrives at the prom, Andie has second thoughts about braving the crowd on her own until she sees Duckie. They reconcile and walk into the ballroom arm in arm.

As a drunk Steff begins mocking the couple, Blane confronts him and finally realizes that Steff resents Andie because she had turned down his advances. He calls out his spoiled and entitled attitude, saying he no longer wishes to associate with him. Blane shakes Duckie's hand and apologizes to Andie, telling her that he always believed in her and will always love her, kissing her cheek before walking out.

Duckie points out to Andie that Blane went to the prom alone and concedes that Blane is not like the other rich kids at school. He advises Andie to go after him, joking that he will never take her to another prom if she does not. He then sees a girl smiling at him, signaling him to come over and dance. Andie catches up with Blane in the parking lot and they share a long kiss and reunite.

== Cast ==
- Molly Ringwald as Andie Walsh
- Harry Dean Stanton as Jack Walsh
- Jon Cryer as Philip F. "Duckie" Dale
- Annie Potts as Iona
- James Spader as Steff McKee
- Andrew McCarthy as Blane McDonnagh
- Kate Vernon as Benny Hanson
- Andrew Dice Clay as Bouncer
- Kristy Swanson as Duckette
- Alexa Kenin as Jena Hoeman
- Dweezil Zappa as Simon
- Gina Gershon as Trombley
- Margaret Colin as English teacher
- Jim Haynie as Donnelly, School Director
- Emily Longstreth as Kate
- Maggie Roswell as Mrs. Dietz

Charlie Sheen was considered for the role of Blane but Ringwald convinced the filmmakers to cast McCarthy. Anthony Michael Hall turned down the role of Duckie because he didn't want to be typecast. Ringwald lobbied for Robert Downey Jr. to be cast as Duckie but agreed that Cryer made sense in light of the film's revised ending. Jennifer Beals turned down the role of Andie. Jodie Foster, Sarah Jessica Parker, Tatum O'Neal, and Lori Loughlin were also considered.

== Production ==
=== Origin ===
Ringwald said that she introduced Hughes to The Psychedelic Furs song of the same name, which inspired him to write the screenplay.

=== Production ===
Deutch felt there was something missing in the opening scene. Hughes later wrote the scene where Jack tells Andie maybe she could add some ruffles underneath his T-shirt.

=== Changed ending ===
Originally, Andie and Duckie ended up together, but test audiences booed this ending. Hughes wrote a new ending where Andie and Blane get together instead. This was shot in one day several months after the film wrapped production, on a soundstage designed to look like the Los Angeles hotel ballroom where the first ending had been filmed. When called back to film the new scene, Andrew McCarthy was in pre-production for a stage play and had lost weight and cut his hair for the role, so he was fitted with a wig. Ringwald had anticipated that audiences would be dissatisfied with the original ending, saying: "It didn't make sense to have the entire movie be this Cinderella story [yet] she doesn't get to end up with the guy she wants." Ringwald has said Duckie was based on her best friend, who was gay and with whom she "had an extremely nonromantic relationship".

Cryer has said he was shocked that the test audience disliked the pairing and felt the film was built around Andie and Duckie ending up together. Hughes aimed "to protect Duckie's character" in the new ending by having another girl at the prom show interest in him. Paramount executives were also apprehensive about the original ending, worried that the film might be perceived as classist and as suggesting that wealthy people and poor people do not mix. Orchestral Manoeuvres in the Dark had written the song "Goddess of Love" for the original ending (which they later rewrote and released on the album The Pacific Age). Hughes didn't consider the song a good fit for the new ending and asked the band to write something else. With only two days before going on tour, OMD wrote "If You Leave" in less than 24 hours. Paramount has said that it cannot find the footage of the original ending.

=== Dedication ===
In the closing credits, the film is dedicated to actress Alexa Kenin and set designer Bruce Weintraub, both of whom died shortly after production had finished.

=== Novel ===
The film was adapted into a novel by H. B. Gilmour and Randi Reisfield, released in 1986. It was published by Bantam Books (ISBN 0-553-25944-X. ISBN 978-0553259445). The book was written before the last scene was changed, so it has the ending in which Andie ends up with Duckie.

== Release ==
=== Box office ===
Pretty in Pink was the top-grossing film for the week of March 12, 1986. It earned $6.1 million during its opening weekend and $40.5 million during its theatrical run. It was the 22nd-highest-grossing film of 1986.

=== Reception ===
On review aggregator Rotten Tomatoes the film holds an approval rating of 75% based on 117 reviews. The site's consensus reads: "Molly Ringwald gives an outstanding performance in this sweet, intelligent teen comedy that takes an ancient premise and injects it with insight and wit."

Metacritic, which uses a weighted average, assigned the film a score of 56 out of 100, based on 22 critics, indicating "mixed or average" reviews. Audiences polled by CinemaScore gave the film an average grade of "B+" on an A+ to F scale.

Roger Ebert gave the film three stars out of four, criticizing the "old, old, old" plot but praising Ringwald's and Annie Potts's performances and calling it "a heartwarming and mostly truthful movie, with some nice touches of humor."

Janet Maslin of The New York Times wrote, "Fortunately, the actors are mostly likable, and the story is told gently enough to downplay both its trendiness and its conventionality."

James Harwood of Variety wrote, "In his mid-30s, John Hughes' much-vaunted teen thinking now seems to be maturing a bit in Pretty in Pink, a rather intelligent (if not terribly original) look at adolescent insecurities ... Teamed with Hughes for the third time, Molly Ringwald is herself growing as an actress, lending Pink a solid emotional center that largely boils down to making the audience care about her."

Pauline Kael of The New Yorker wrote that Ringwald "carries the movie, though she has nothing particularly interesting to do or say" and called the film "slight and vapid, with the consistency of watery Jello." Gene Siskel of the Chicago Tribune gave the film one-and-a-half stars out of four, faulting a "tired script" and Cryer's "one-note performance", though he found Ringwald "absolutely beguiling."

Patrick Goldstein of the Los Angeles Times called the film "delightful", adding, "what makes Pretty in Pink such a satisfying, big-hearted film isn't its creaky story line or its somewhat unconvincing conclusion, but the way it lets us watch kids through their own eyes, exploring feelings instead of making caricatures of them. Written by Hughes and directed by newcomer Howard Deutch, the movie neatly captures the nuances of youth, reminding us how the most casual remark can unleash a flood of insecurities."

Paul Attanasio of The Washington Post wrote that "for the most part, Pretty in Pink works from a standard formula—rich boy, poor girl—and does little to tweak or reinvent it."

== Legacy ==
The main cast of Pretty in Pink appeared in the October 15, 2010, issue of Entertainment Weekly, which featured reunions of casts of landmark films and television shows. The movie was mentioned in the song “1985” by rock band Bowling for Soup from its 2004 album A Hangover You Don't Deserve with the line “she knows all the classics. She knows every line. Breakfast Club, Pretty in Pink, even St. Elmo's Fire”.

== Soundtrack ==
Pretty in Pink

Soundtrack album by various artists
- Released: February 28, 1986
- Genres: Post-punk; new wave
- Length: 39:35
- Label: A&M
- Producer: David Anderle (soundtrack executive producer)

Singles from Pretty in Pink
- 1. "Shellshock" Released: March 17, 1986; 2. "If You Leave" Released: April 21, 1986; 3. "Left of Center" Released: May 26, 1986; 4. "Pretty in Pink" Released: October 1986

Like earlier Hughes films, Pretty in Pink has a soundtrack mostly of new wave music. Director Howard Deutch originally intended the film to primarily contain theme music, but Hughes influenced Deutch's decision to use post-punk music throughout. The title song by the Psychedelic Furs acted as a bit of inspiration for the film and was rerecorded specifically for the film's opening sequence in a version less raw than the original version that appeared on the 1981 album Talk Talk Talk. "Left of Center" was remixed by Arthur Baker. The first track, "If You Leave", by Orchestral Manoeuvres in the Dark, was written in 1985 specifically for the film. In addition to the soundtrack song "Shellshock", New Order contributed an instrumental version of "Thieves Like Us" and the instrumental "Elegia", both of which appear in the film but not on the soundtrack.

The Rave-Ups, who appear in the film performing "Positively Lost Me" and "Shut-Up" from their Town and Country album, have no songs on the soundtrack album. Nik Kershaw's "Wouldn't It Be Good" appears on the soundtrack in a version by former Three Dog Night vocalist Danny Hutton's band, Danny Hutton Hitters. The Smiths' "Please Please Please Let Me Get What I Want" appears on the soundtrack and was later covered by the Autumns for the 2000 Isn't She Still... The Original Motion Picture Soundtrack Revisited album. Also noteworthy is the inclusion of Echo & the Bunnymen's "Bring On the Dancing Horses", which, according to the liner notes of the CD release of the band's compilation album Songs to Learn & Sing, was recorded specifically for the film.

The film also includes Otis Redding's "Try a Little Tenderness", to which Duckie lip-synchs in the film, the Association's "Cherish", and Talk Back's "Rudy". These tracks are not on the soundtrack album.

The soundtrack was released on vinyl by A&M Records in February 1986 and was certified gold by the RIAA two months later. It was listed on the "Best Movie Soundtracks: The 15 Film Music Compilations That'll Change Your Life" list in The Huffington Post and "The 25 Greatest Soundtracks of All Time" list in Rolling Stone. AllMusic rated it four stars out of five. It was re-released in 2013 as a limited edition on pink-colored vinyl.

No.	Title	Writer(s)	Performer(s)	Length
1.	"If You Leave"	Andy McCluskey, Paul Humphreys, Martin Cooper	Orchestral Manoeuvres in the Dark	4:25
2.	"Left of Center"	Suzanne Vega/Steve Addabbo	Suzanne Vega with Joe Jackson	3:32
3.	"Get to Know Ya"	Johnson	Jesse Johnson	3:33
4.	"Do Wot You Do"	Andrew Farriss, Michael Hutchence	INXS	3:17
5.	"Pretty in Pink"	John Ashton, Tim Butler, Richard Butler, Vince Ely, Duncan Kilburn, Roger Morris	The Psychedelic Furs	4:40
6.	"Shellshock"	New Order, John Robie	New Order	6:04
7.	"Round, Round"	Belouis Some	Belouis Some	4:06
8.	"Wouldn't It Be Good"	Nik Kershaw	Danny Hutton Hitters	3:43
9.	"Bring On the Dancing Horses"	Will Sergeant, Ian McCulloch, Les Pattinson, Pete de Freitas	Echo & the Bunnymen	3:59
10.	"Please, Please, Please, Let Me Get What I Want"	Johnny Marr, Morrissey	The Smiths	1:50
Total length:				39:35

=== Charts ===
Weekly chart performance for Pretty in Pink
Chart (1986)	Peak position
Australian Albums (Kent Music Report)	6
Canada Top Albums/CDs (RPM)	6
New Zealand Albums (RMNZ)	5
US Billboard 200	5

Year-end chart performance for Pretty in Pink
Chart (1986)	Position
Australian Albums (Kent Music Report)	45
Canada Top Albums/CDs (RPM)	30
US Billboard 200	50
US Soundtrack Albums (Billboard)	3

=== Singles released ===
Year	Title	Artist	Chart positions							
Year	Title	Artist	US Hot 100	US D/P	US D/S	AUS	CA	IE	NZ	UK
1986	"Shellshock": Released: March 17, 1986	New Order	–	14	26	23	–	18	8	28
1986	"If You Leave": Released: April 21, 1986	Orchestral Manoeuvres in the Dark	4	–	31	15	5	–	5	48
1986	"Left of Center": Released: May 26, 1986	Suzanne Vega and Joe Jackson	–	–	–	35	–	28	–	32
1986	"Pretty in Pink": Released: October 1986	The Psychedelic Furs	41	–	–	–	61	–	–	18

== Bibliography ==
- Kent, David (1993). Australian Chart Book 1970–1992 (illustrated ed.). St Ives, N.S.W.: Australian Chart Book. ISBN 0-646-11917-6.
