= Made of Rain =

Studio album by the Psychedelic Furs
- Released: 31 July 2020
- Recorded: 2019–20
- Length: 51:40
- Label: Cooking Vinyl
- Producers: Richard Fortus; David Maurice; The Psychedelic Furs

The Psychedelic Furs chronology
World Outside (1991)	Made of Rain (2020)

Made of Rain is the eighth studio album by the English rock band the Psychedelic Furs. Released on 31 July 2020 by Cooking Vinyl, it is the first studio album from the band in almost 30 years and received positive reviews.

== Recording and release ==
When the band reunited in 2000, they had intended on recording new material but principal songwriter Richard Butler did not feel confident in any newly written songs until six months before prior to the sessions for Made of Rain. It is the first studio release by the group since 1991's World Outside and was preceded by lead single "Don't Believe" on 31 January 2020. The album was initially scheduled to be released on 1 May, but was delayed until 31 July due to manufacturing issues stemming from the COVID-19 pandemic.

== Critical reception ==
Professional ratings
Aggregate scores
Source	Rating
AnyDecentMusic?	7.2/10
Metacritic	78/100
Review scores
Source	Rating
AllMusic	3.5/5 stars
American Songwriter	3.5/5 stars
The Arts Desk	3/5 stars
Classic Rock	4/5 stars
Consequence of Sound	B+
Entertainment Weekly	B+
The Independent	3/5 stars
Louder Than War	9.5/10
MusicOMH	4/5 stars
PopMatters	6/10

According to the review aggregator Metacritic, Made of Rain received "generally favorable reviews" based on a weighted average score of 78 out of 100 from 13 critic scores. Album of the Year sums up critical consensus as a 77 out of 100, with 12 reviewers and AnyDecentMusic? rates it 7.2 out of 10 with eight critics.

Hal Horowitz of American Songwriter gave the release 3.5 out of five stars and called it "long overdue", with some repetition and an over-long runtime but several songs that highlight Richard Butler's talents as a performer and songwriter. In The Arts Desk, Guy Oddy's three-out-of-five-star review looks forward to hearing the songs performed live to hear new music "which displays the band’s distinctive swagger". Consequence of Sound's Jordan Blum had a B+ review, praising several technical aspects but also criticizing the sequencing and sameness of several songs.

In The Independent, Elissa Bray gave Made of Rain three out of five stars and called this "a welcome return to the Furs’ classic blend of aggression, tender melody and brooding ambience" that is darker than previous material. MusicOMH's Ross Horton compared the work to artist as diverse as Phil Spector and U2 circa The Joshua Tree, summing up "At this stage in their careers, with nothing left to prove, The Psychedelic Furs needn’t have made anything this good"; his review is four out of five stars. John Bergstrom of PopMatters had a mixed six out of 10 stars, with praise for "The Boy That Invented Rock and Roll" in particular but criticism of all other tracks as being "an anticlimax".

The review from Tim Sendra at AllMusic was also reserved in its praise, stating "It may not be Talk Talk Talk, Pt. 2 or Forever Now again, but it proves the Furs still have plenty of life left in them, and it's always nice to hear Richard Butler's voice no matter what the setting."

== Track listing ==
No.	Title	Writer(s)	Length
1.	"The Boy That Invented Rock & Roll"	Richard Butler and Rich Good	3:37
2.	"Don't Believe"	R. Butler, Tim Butler, Paul Garisto, and Good	3:45
3.	"You'll Be Mine"	R. Butler and T. Butler	4:48
4.	"Wrong Train"	John Ashton, R. Butler, and T. Butler	4:13
5.	"This'll Never Be Like Love"	R. Butler and Good	5:10
6.	"Ash Wednesday"	R. Butler and Garisto	5:38
7.	"Come All Ye Faithful"	R. Butler and Good	4:23
8.	"No-One"	R. Butler and Good	4:23
9.	"Tiny Hands"	R. Butler and T. Butler	3:46
10.	"Hide the Medicine"	R. Butler and Richard Fortus	3:46
11.	"Turn Your Back on Me"	R. Butler and Garisto	4:14
12.	"Stars"	R. Butler, Jon Carin, and Fortus	3:57
Total length:			51:40

== Personnel ==
The Psychedelic Furs

- Richard Butler – vocals, production
- Tim Butler – bass guitar, production
- Paul Garisto – drums
- Rich Good – guitar
- Amanda Kramer – keyboards
- Mars Williams – saxophone

Additional musicians

- Richard Fortus - guitars, cello, mandolin
- BT - additional keyboards
- Jon Carin - additional keyboards
- Joe McGinty - additional keyboards
- Paisley Fortus - background vocals
- Clover Fortus - background vocals

Technical personnel

- Richard Fortus – production
- David Maurice – production
- Tim Palmer – mixing
- Jason McEntire – engineering

== Charts ==
European Chart performance for Made of Rain
Chart (2020)	Peak position
German Albums (Offizielle Top 100)	47
Scottish Albums (Official Charts)	5
Spanish Albums (PROMUSICAE)	62
Swiss Albums (Schweizer Hitparade)	41
UK Albums (Official Charts)	13
Belgian Albums (Ultratop Flanders)	166
