= Beautiful Chaos: Greatest Hits Live =

Live album by the Psychedelic Furs
- Released: November 2001
- Recorded: April 2001
- Venues: House of Blues, Los Angeles
- Genres: Post-punk; new wave
- Label: CBS

The Psychedelic Furs chronology
'Radio One Sessions' (1999)	Beautiful Chaos: Greatest Hits Live (2001)	Made of Rain (2020)

Professional ratings
Review scores
Source	Rating
AllMusic	3/5 stars
The Rolling Stone Album Guide	2/5 stars

Beautiful Chaos: Greatest Hits Live is a live album by the Psychedelic Furs. The performance was simultaneously released on DVD titled The Psychedelic Furs: Live from the House of Blues.

== Content ==
The performance was recorded live at the House of Blues in Los Angeles on April 13–14, 2001.

The Los Angeles Times reviewed the reunion tour at the Anaheim House of Blues on April 12, the night before the recorded performances in Los Angeles. The Times stated that it was a sold-out show that mixed old and new material and noted the "Bowie-esque magnetism" of front man Richard Butler.

The CD was released in November 2001 by Sony Records. It contains the studio recording "Alive (For Once In My Lifetime)". The DVD was released on November 19, 2001 and included songs not present on the CD.

== CD track listing ==
1. "India" – 6:37
2. "Mr. Jones" (live) – 4:01
3. "Heaven" – 4:20
4. "The Ghost in You" – 4:51
5. "Alive (For Once in My Lifetime)" – 4:35
6. "Love My Way" – 4:01
7. "Heartbreak Beat" – 5:35
8. "Sister Europe" – 6:00
9. "President Gas" – 5:16
10. "Into You Like a Train" – 4:48
11. "Pretty in Pink" – 4:37
12. "Dumb Waiters" – 6:47
13. "Alive (For Once in My Lifetime)" (studio version) – 4:42

== DVD track listing ==
Directed by Kerry Asmussen with a runtime of 80 minutes, the DVD includes songs not included on the CD

1. "India"
2. "Mr. Jones"
3. "Heaven"
4. "No Easy Street" *
5. "Ghost in You"
6. "Alive"
7. "Love My Way"
8. "Wrong Train" *
9. "Heartbreak Beat"
10. "Sister Europe"
11. "Anodyne (Better Days)" *
12. "Only You and I (Angels)" *
13. "Pretty in Pink"
14. "Dumb Waiters"
- indicates not present on CD

== Personnel ==
The Psychedelic Furs

- Richard Butler – vocals
- John Ashton – guitar
- Tim Butler – bass
- Richard Fortus – guitar
- Earl Harvin – drums
