= Sister Europe =

1980 single by The Psychedelic Furs

Single by the Psychedelic Furs

from the album The Psychedelic Furs
- Released: February 1980
- Recorded: 1979
- Studio: RAK (London)
- Length: 5:38
- Label: CBS (UK); Columbia (US)
- Songwriters: John Ashton; Tim Butler; Richard Butler; Vince Ely; Duncan Kilburn; Roger Morris
- Producer: Steve Lillywhite

The Psychedelic Furs singles chronology
| "We Love You" (1979) | "Sister Europe" (1980) | "Mr. Jones" (1980) |

Music video
- "Sister Europe" on YouTube

"Sister Europe" is a song by the English rock band the Psychedelic Furs, taken from the band's debut studio album, The Psychedelic Furs (1980). Written by the band and produced by Steve Lillywhite, it was released in February 1980 by CBS Records as the album's second single.

The Psychedelic Furs traditionally opened their live shows with "Sister Europe" during the early part of their career.

== Composition ==
Lead vocalist Richard Butler recalled Lillywhite's directions to him regarding the vocals: "He told me, 'Go down to the pub, have a couple of beers, and when you come back, I want you to sing like it's three in the morning, and you're talking on the telephone to someone'". According to Butler, the lyrics conveyed sadness over his then-girlfriend moving away, and were written using imagery, "instead of saying 'My bird's gone to Italy and I miss her'".

== Release ==
"Sister Europe" was first released as a single in the UK in February 1980. The initial 7-inch release was on the Epic label, but this was withdrawn and replaced by a CBS version. Both releases had the unusual feature of a double A-side featuring two versions of the song, short (3:45) and long (4:13). In the US, the song was not released as a single but was used as the B-side for Columbia's 12-inch promo single of "We Love You".

An official music video was produced in 1980, directed by the British filmmakers Don Letts and Mick Calvert.

== Critical reception ==
In The Rough Guide to Rock, writer Alex Ogg called it "an intoxicating song that announced the group's distinctive style", comparing it to the Velvet Underground mixed with David Bowie.

AllMusic writer Dave Thompson described Butler's vocal as "a masterpiece of understatement, whispered intimacy". The Record Mirror said, "Unpromising start is saved by some "Man Who Sold The World" vocals. In fact, the vocals are the only interesting bit of this, which sets a heavy atmosphere that I find really listenable."

The single reached No. 47 on the New Zealand charts.

The song and its production were a direct influence on the Replacements' 1983 song "Within Your Reach", one of Paul Westerberg's first efforts to compose outside the group's hardcore mien.

== Cover versions ==
The American rock band the Foo Fighters released a cover version of "Sister Europe" as the B-side to their 2002 single "All My Life," which also appeared as a bonus track on the French release of the band's fourth studio album One by One, and on their 01020225 EP released in 2019 as part of their "Foo Files" archival series.

== Track listing ==
7" vinyl

1. "Sister Europe" – 4:13
2. "****" – 3:45

12" vinyl (US promo)

1. "We Love You" – 3:26
2. "Sister Europe" – 5:39

== Chart performance ==
| Chart (1980) | Peak position |
|---|---|
| New Zealand RIANZ Singles Chart | 47 |
