= No Release =

No Release may refer to:

- "No Release", a song by Rainbow on their 1981 album Difficult to Cure
- "No Release", a song by The Psychedelic Furs on their 1987 album Midnight to Midnight
- No Release, a project of American musician Brian Fallon
