= Live at the House of Blues =

Live at the House of Blues may refer to:

== Albums ==
- Live at the House of Blues (Adolescents album), 2004
- Live at the House of Blues (Guttermouth album), 2003
- Live at the House of Blues (Thrice album), 2008
- Live at the House of Blues (Tupac Shakur album), 2005
- Live at the House of Blues (The Vandals album), 2004
- Greatest Hits: Live at the House of Blues, by DJ Quik, 2006
- Live at the House of Blues, New Orleans, by Better than Ezra, 2004
- Live at the House of Blues, by Goldfinger, 2004
- Live at the House of Blues, Cleveland 9.15.07, by Sum 41, 2011
- Live at the House of Blues, Sunset Strip, by Jesse McCartney, 2009

== Videos ==
- Live at the House of Blues, by Reel Big Fish, 2003
- Renegade Live @ The House of Blues, by Renegade, 2010

== See also ==
- Blues Brothers & Friends: Live from House of Blues, a 1997 album
- House of Yes: Live from House of Blues, by Yes, 2000
- Live from the House of Blues, a 1995 American television series
- Live from the House of Blues, a 2001 DVD by the Psychedelic Furs
