= There's a World =

There's a World may refer to:

- "There's a World" (Neil Young song), from the 1972 album Harvest
  - "There's a World" (Sufjan Stevens song), a cover from the 2023 album Javelin
- "There's a World" (The Psychedelic Furs song), from the 1991 album World Outside
- "There's a World" (Next to Normal), from the 2008 musical Next to Normal
