= Heartbreak Beat =

Single by Psychedelic Furs

from the album Midnight to Midnight
- B-side: "New Dream"
- Released: October 1986
- Genre: New wave, pop rock
- Length: 4:03
- Label: Columbia, CBS
- Songwriters: Richard Butler, John Ashton, and Tim Butler
- Producer: Chris Kimsey

Psychedelic Furs singles chronology
"Pretty in Pink (re-recording)" (1986)	"Heartbreak Beat" (1986)	"Shock" (1987)

“Heartbreak Beat” is a song by the English new wave band the Psychedelic Furs, originally released in 1986 as the lead single for their 1987 album Midnight to Midnight. The song was written by band members Richard Butler, John Ashton, and Tim Butler. The song also appeared on the UK music compilation Hits 5 in November 1986.

== Release ==
"Heartbreak Beat" was released by CBS in the United Kingdom on 13 September 1986 with "New Dream" as its B-side. "Heartbreak Beat" peaked at No. 79 on the UK Singles Chart the following month.

In the United States, "Heartbreak Beat" initially broke through on album-oriented rock radio stations before crossing over to contemporary hit radio. The song picked up attention by the program director of the Fresno radio station KKDJ, saying that "it's got Bowie-esque vocals and a haunting, comforting sound. People should really come out of the box on this." It reached No. 26 on the Billboard Hot 100 in 1987 and became the Psychedelic Furs' only Top 40 hit on that chart. The song also reached the top 20 of both the Billboard Album Rock Tracks and Dance charts.

A music video was created for the single, which was directed by Jim Shea. Some of the music video's footage was shot in Los Angeles in November 1986 to capture street scenes. One of these filming sessions lasted around two hours, consisting of the five band members and eight extras walking up and down the streets of Los Angeles. Roughly three seconds from this filming session appeared in the music video.

== Critical reception ==
Billboard called "Heartbreak Beat" a "wall-of-sound pop-rocker" that "finds the band's gruff core tempered by production glitz". Writing for Musician, J.D. Considine said that the song "manages to deliver the dancefloor potential only hinted at by 'Heartbeat', the dance track from Mirror Moves."

== Track listing ==
7" Vinyl

1. "Heartbreak Beat" (4:03)
2. "New Dream" (4:54)

12" Vinyl (UK)

1. "Heartbreak Beat" (New York Mix) (8:04)
2. "Heartbreak Beat" (Single Mix) (4:02)
3. "New Dream" (4:54)

12" Vinyl (US)

1. "Heartbreak Beat" (Extended) (8:04)
2. "Heartbreak Beat" (Dub) (5:41)
3. "New Dream" (4:54)

12" Vinyl (US Promo)

1. "Heartbreak Beat" (7" Version) (4:03)
2. "Heartbreak Beat" (Album Version) (5:10)

== Charts ==
Chart (1986–1987)	Peak position
Canada Top Singles (RPM)	78
New Zealand (Recorded Music NZ)	23
UK Singles (Official Charts Company)	79
US Billboard Hot 100	26
US Mainstream Rock (Billboard)	11
US Dance Club Songs (Billboard) remix	14
