= All That Money Wants =

Single by the Psychedelic Furs

from the album All of This and Nothing
- Released: 1988
- Recorded: 1988
- Genre: Alternative rock
- Label: Columbia
- Songwriters: John Ashton, Tim Butler, Richard Butler

The Psychedelic Furs singles chronology
"Shock" (1987)	"All That Money Wants" (1988)	"Should God Forget" (1989)

"All That Money Wants" is a song by the English rock band the Psychedelic Furs, released by Columbia Records in July 1988 as a single from the band's best-of compilation album All of This and Nothing. The B-side was "Birdland". In the UK, the same single was released on Columbia's CBS label.

Richard Butler described "All That Money Wants" as "a bit of a return to the old sound of the band that we had. It's more layered. It's a bit more mysterious, lyrically."

The single reached No. 75 on the UK Singles Chart and No. 1 in the U.S. on Billboard's Modern Rock Tracks chart.

== Charts ==
Chart (1988)	Peak position
UK Singles (OCC)	75
US Alternative Airplay (Billboard)	1

== See also ==
- List of Billboard Modern Rock Tracks number ones of the 1980s
