= Dumb Waiters (song) =

Single by The Psychedelic Furs

from the album Talk Talk Talk
- B-side: "Dash"
- Released: April 1981
- Genre: Post-punk
- Length: 3:35
- Label: Columbia
- Songwriters: John Ashton; Tim Butler; Richard Butler; Vince Ely; Duncan Kilburn; Roger Morris
- Producer: Steve Lillywhite

The Psychedelic Furs singles chronology
| "Mr. Jones" (1980) | "Dumb Waiters" (1981) | "Pretty in Pink" (1981) |

Music video
- "Dumb Waiters" on YouTube

"Dumb Waiters" is a song by the English rock band the Psychedelic Furs, released as a single in April 1981 by Columbia Records. Written by the band and produced by Steve Lillywhite, it was included on the band's second studio album Talk Talk Talk (1981).

== Release ==
To help promote Talk Talk Talk, the UK single for "Dumb Waiters" was packaged in an embossed plastic sleeve, playable at 33 1/3 RPM on a turntable, which contained a track with excerpts from the songs "Into You Like a Train", "I Wanna Sleep with You" and "Pretty in Pink". Lead vocalist Richard Butler opened the track by saying, "This is a Psychedelic Furs commercial. Buy Talk Talk Talk". "Dumb Waiters" was the first Psychedelic Furs single to chart in the UK, peaking at No. 59 on the UK singles chart. It also reached No. 27 on the US National Disco Action Top 80 chart.

== Critical reception ==
AllMusic writer Dave Thompson said that the song "captures the band at its most frenzied, a state of mind which subsequent live versions only amplified". AllMusic's Ned Raggett called the song "especially striking. . .with its queasy, slow-paced arrangement that allows both [Duncan] Kilburn's harmonica and [John] Ashton's guitar to go wild".

== Cover versions ==
American dance-punk revival band the Rapture recorded a cover version of the song, which was included on the B-side of their 1998 debut single, "The Chair That Squeaks".

== Track listing ==
7" vinyl

1. "Dumb Waiters" – 3:35
2. "Dash" – 3:06
- Playable sleeve contains "A Psychedelic Furs Commercial" – 4:39

== Chart performance ==
| Chart (1981) | Peak position |
|---|---|
| UK singles chart | 59 |
| US National Disco Action Top 80 | 27 |
