= Joe McGinty =

American musician

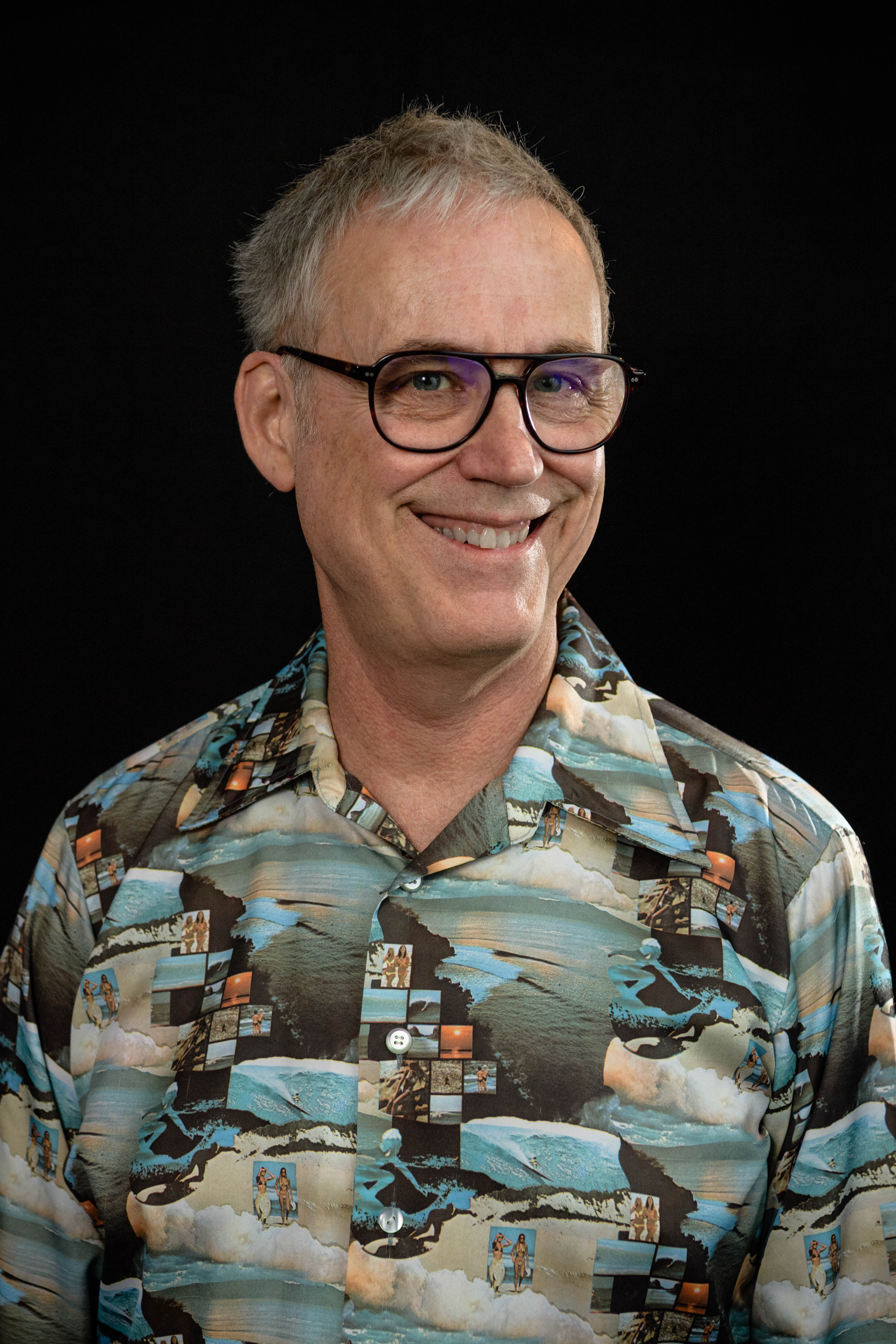
McGinty in 2018

Joe McGinty is an American composer, keyboardist and arranger who was born in Atlantic City, New Jersey. McGinty is notable for his five years as the keyboardist for the Psychedelic Furs (after a brief stint with Robert Hazard in Philadelphia). He is also the founder of the Loser's Lounge tribute series. He opened a New York City piano bar, Sid Gold's Request Room, with Beauty Bar owner Paul Devitt. He has an original project with singer Andrea Diaz, the Duchess and the Fox.

== Career ==
McGinty got his start playing keyboards with his high school friends in the South Jersey area. In 1983, he was invited to join the showband '"Franco And Mary Jane". For two years McGinty travelled across the country playing casino lounges, Sheratons and Marriotts, playing 4 or 5 sets a night, 6 nights a week. In 1985, he started a band with his Franco and Mary Jane bandmates, "Racket Club" that played the Florida club circuit. "Racket Club" disbanded in 1986. Relocating to South Jersey, McGinty joined Robert Hazard's band and was with Robert Hazard for a year until he heard about auditions for the Psychedelic Furs. He auditioned for the Psychedelic Furs in 1987 and joined them for the "Midnight to Midnight" tour, staying with them for 5 years until they disbanded in 1992. His playing can be heard on the single "All That Money Wants" and the LPs Book of Days and World Outside.

After the Furs disbanded, he immersed himself in the local East Village music scene. In 1992 he joined The Kustard Kings (David Terhune's instrumental surf-funk band). In 1993, he started Loser's Lounge and formed his first band featuring his own compositions.

McGinty has also worked with Ryan Adams, Ramones, Nada Surf, Kevin Ayers, Martha Wainwright, Die Monster Die, Devendra Banhart, Ronnie Spector, Jesse Malin, Amy Rigby, Spacehog and others. He has composed music for independent films and TV shows, including HBO's G String Divas.

McGinty has worked alternately as musical director for a variety of New York theaters, including the Vineyard Theatre and the New York Theatre Workshop.

== Loser's Lounge ==
McGinty is the founder and music director of the Loser's Lounge tribute series, which pays homage to pop icons of the past. Loser's Lounge made its debut in 1993 with a Burt Bacharach tribute at Fez, and is now based at Joe's Pub. The Loser's Lounge has also performed at the Allen Room at Lincoln Center, Celebrate Brooklyn, Westbeth Theater Center, The Knitting Factory, Makor and the Jewish Museum.

McGinty and the Loser's Lounge Band were the house band for Comedy Central's "Night Of Too Many Stars" benefit for autism education; AmfAR (backing Stevie Wonder, Gladys Knight, Elton John and Dionne Warwick); several MoveOn events and The David Lynch Foundation.

== The Duchess and the Fox ==
McGinty teamed up with Superhuman Happiness (a Stuart Bogie project) singer Andrea Diaz to form the "cabaret-noir" duo, the Duchess and the Fox. They released their debut EP Every Night in February 2016.

== Sid Gold's Request Room ==
Sid Gold's Request Room, a retro-styled piano bar in the Chelsea neighborhood of New York City, opened its doors in May 2015. Live "piano karaoke" can be heard every night, and McGinty plays there four nights a week.

== Carousel vintage keyboard studio and music production ==
McGinty owns a vintage keyboard studio in Brooklyn, which features over 30 vintage keyboards, including a Chamberlin, Fender Rhodes, Hammond organ, Clavinet, Wurlitzer electronic piano and many analog synthesizers. McGinty has produced Unicornicopia's debut CD. He has also produced music for The Daily Show.

== Film and television ==
McGinty has composed and/or produced music for Bored to Death, The Daily Show, What Happened, Miss Simone?, G String Divas, The Virginity Hit, and Last Chance Harvey.

He composed original songs for the film One More Time starring Christopher Walken and Amber Heard. In the film, Walken sings the song "When I Live My Life Over Again", and Heard sings the song "Montreal", both composed by McGinty and director Robert Edwards. He scored the short film Super Sleuths, directed by Benjamin Dickinson.

== McGinty & White ==
McGinty has teamed with singer/songwriter Ward White for the chamber pop project McGinty & White. The duo have self-released the album McGinty & White Sing Selections From the McGinty & White Songbook. They have played as musical guests at New York's Upright Citizens Brigade Theatre.

== Circuit Parade ==
Circuit Parade is an experimental electronic chamber pop band which features analog synthesizers, cello and woodwinds. Members included McGinty (electric piano, synthesizers), Mike McGinnis (woodwinds), Leon Dewan (Dewanatron) and Julia Kent (cello). For live shows, Eleanor Norton plays cello. Circuit Parade released one CD, Negativland, in 2008.

== Baby Steps ==
Baby Steps was an orchestral pop ensemble led by McGinty which lasted from 1993 until 2004. Baby Steps released a self-titled EP, Baby Steps and a full-length record, Kiss Me, Stupid.

== Space Nutz ==
Space Nutz is McGinty synthesizer project. One EP was released featuring synthesizer cover versions of songs by the Ramones, Black Sabbath, and the Partridge Family, as well as original compositions.
