= Beautiful Chaos =

Beautiful Chaos may refer to:

- Beautiful Chaos (Garcia and Stohl novel)
- Beautiful Chaos (Russell novel)
- Beautiful Chaos: Greatest Hits Live, an album by Psychedelic Furs
- Beautiful Chaos (EP), by Katseye
  - The Beautiful Chaos Tour, a concert tour by Katseye
