= Midnight to Midnight =

Studio album by the Psychedelic Furs
- Released: 2 February 1987
- Studios: Hansa Tonstudio (Berlin, Germany); Bearsville (Woodstock)
- Genre: Pop rock
- Length: 42:40
- Label: Columbia
- Producer: Chris Kimsey

The Psychedelic Furs chronology
Mirror Moves (1984)	Midnight to Midnight (1987)	All of This and Nothing (1988)

Singles from Midnight to Midnight
- 1. "Heartbreak Beat" Released: October 1986; 2. "Angels Don't Cry" Released: 1987; 3. "Shock" Released: 1987

Professional ratings
Review scores
Source	Rating
AllMusic	3/5 stars
Robert Christgau	B
Rolling Stone	Unrated

Midnight to Midnight is the fifth studio album by the English rock band the Psychedelic Furs, released on 2 February 1987 by Columbia Records.

Midnight to Midnight was produced by Chris Kimsey, who was known for his work with the Rolling Stones. A more overtly commercial effort than the Psychedelic Furs had previously recorded, Midnight to Midnight was their highest-charting album in the UK, peaking at number 12, yet lead vocalist Richard Butler later characterized it as "hollow, vapid and weak", and the album has been described as "over-produced and underwhelming". The album also featured the single "Heartbreak Beat", which proved to be the Furs' biggest Top 40 entry in the US at that time.

== Track listing ==
All tracks composed and arranged by Richard Butler, John Ashton and Tim Butler, except where stated.

1. "Heartbreak Beat" – 5:10
2. "Shock" – 5:05
3. "Shadow in My Heart" – 4:07
4. "Angels Don't Cry" – 5:07
5. "Midnight to Midnight" – 4:30
6. "One More Word" – 5:17
7. "All of the Law" – 4:46
8. "Torture" – 3:50
9. "No Release" – 4:52
10. "Pretty in Pink" (1986 version) – 4:12 (Butler, Ashton, Butler, Morris, Kilburn, Ely)

The 1986 remake of "Pretty in Pink" only appears on the original UK/Euro cassette and CD issues.

=== Original US LP release ===
Side one

1. "Heartbreak Beat" – 5:10
2. "Shock" – 5:05
3. "Shadow in My Heart" – 4:07
4. "Angels Don't Cry" – 5:07

Side two

1. "Midnight to Midnight" – 4:30
2. "One More Word" – 5:17
3. "All of the Law" – 4:46
4. "Torture" – 3:50
5. "No Release" – 4:52

== Personnel ==
The Psychedelic Furs

- Richard Butler – vocals
- John Ashton – guitar
- Tim Butler – bass guitar
- Mars Williams – horns (saxophone)
- Paul Garisto – drums

Additional musicians

- Marty Williamson – second guitar
- Jon Carin – keyboards
- Ed Buller – additional keyboards
- Steve Scales – percussion
- Frank Simms – backing vocals
- Pete Hewlett – backing vocals

Production and artwork

- Chris Kimsey – producing; mixing
- Michael Barbiero – mixing
- Nick Egan – art direction, design
- Michael Halsband – photography

== Videos ==
Official music videos were produced for the singles "Heartbreak Beat", "Shock", and "Angels Don't Cry", with the latter directed by British filmmaker Tim Pope.

== Chart performance ==
Album

Year	Country	Chart	Peak position
1987	Australia	Kent Music Report	38
1987	United Kingdom	UK Albums Chart	12
1987	United States	Billboard 200	29
1987	Spain	Promusicae	13
1987	New Zealand	NZ Album Chart	20
