= The Psychedelic Furs (album) =

Studio album by the Psychedelic Furs
- Released: 7 March 1980
- Recorded: 1979
- Studio: RAK (London)
- Genre: Post-punk, punk rock
- Length: 40:50
- Label: Columbia
- Producer: Steve Lillywhite; Martin Hannett; Howard Thompson; Ian Taylor; the Psychedelic Furs

The Psychedelic Furs chronology
The Psychedelic Furs (1980)	Talk Talk Talk (1981)

Alternative cover
- US cover

Professional ratings
Review scores
Source	Rating
AllMusic	4.5/5 stars
Christgau's Record Guide	A−
Classic Rock	8/10
Entertainment Weekly	B
Q	4/5 stars
Record Mirror	3.5/5 stars
Rolling Stone	2/5 stars
The Rolling Stone Album Guide	4.5/5 stars
Smash Hits	8/10
Spin Alternative Record Guide	7/10

The Psychedelic Furs is the debut studio album by the English rock band the Psychedelic Furs, released on 7 March 1980 by Columbia Records. It was reissued with bonus tracks in 2002 by Columbia/Legacy. In 2020, Rolling Stone included the band's debut studio album in their "80 Greatest albums of 1980" list, praising the musicians for sounding like "a grand art project".

The original UK LP had nine tracks. The US LP contained 10 tracks, deleting one track from the UK LP ("Blacks/Radio") and adding two others ("Susan's Strange" and "Soap Commercial"), and changing the order of the tracks significantly. The CD reissue contained 13 tracks, beginning with the original nine UK LP tracks (programmed in their original order), then adding the two additional tracks from the US LP release, plus a version of "Mack the Knife" and a demo of the album track "Flowers".

== Lyrics ==
In both his delivery and content Richard Butler introduces the sarcastic style which would become his signature and makes use of a number of recurring motifs in the album's lyrics (track numbering refers to the CD issue).

- "Stupid" (people, friends, dreams, sea) – tracks 1, 2, 4, 6, 8.
- "Useless" (lives, sound, drivel) – tracks 1, 2, 5, 7, 9.
- "Flowers" – tracks 1, 4, 5, 9.
- "Carpet/Floor" – tracks 1, 2, 3, 9.
- "Dancing/Reeling" – tracks 1, 3, 5, 8.

== Track listing ==
All songs were written and arranged by the Psychedelic Furs, with words by Richard Butler, and produced by Steve Lillywhite, except where noted.

=== Original UK LP ===
Side 1

1. "India" – 6:21
2. "Sister Europe" – 5:38
3. "Imitation of Christ" – 5:28
4. "Fall" – 2:40
5. "Pulse" – 2:37 (produced by Howard Thompson, Ian Taylor and the Psychedelic Furs)

Side 2

1. "We Love You" – 3:26 (produced by Howard Thompson, Ian Taylor and the Psychedelic Furs)
2. "Wedding Song" – 4:19
3. "Blacks/Radio" – 6:56
4. "Flowers" – 4:10 (produced by Howard Thompson, Ian Taylor and the Psychedelic Furs)

=== Original US LP ===
Side 1

1. "India" – 6:21
2. "Sister Europe" – 5:38
3. "Susan's Strange" – 3:13 (produced by Martin Hannett)
4. "Fall" – 2:40
5. "We Love You" – 3:26 (produced by Howard Thompson, Ian Taylor and the Psychedelic Furs)

Side 2

1. "Soap Commercial" – 2:53 (produced by Martin Hannett)
2. "Imitation of Christ" – 5:28
3. "Pulse" – 2:37 (produced by Howard Thompson, Ian Taylor and the Psychedelic Furs)
4. "Wedding Song" – 4:19
5. "Flowers" – 4:10 (produced by Howard Thompson, Ian Taylor and the Psychedelic Furs)

=== CD reissue ===
1. "India" – 6:21
2. "Sister Europe" – 5:38
3. "Imitation of Christ" – 5:28
4. "Fall" – 2:40
5. "Pulse" – 2:37 (produced by Howard Thompson, Ian Taylor and the Psychedelic Furs)
6. "We Love You" – 3:26 (produced by Howard Thompson, Ian Taylor and the Psychedelic Furs)
7. "Wedding Song" – 4:19
8. "Blacks/Radio" – 6:56
9. "Flowers" – 4:10 (produced by Howard Thompson, Ian Taylor and the Psychedelic Furs)
10. "Susan's Strange" – 3:13 (produced by Martin Hannett)
11. "Soap Commercial" – 2:53 (produced by Martin Hannett)
12. "Mack the Knife" (Kurt Weill, Bertolt Brecht, Marc Blitzstein) – 4:18 (produced by the Psychedelic Furs)
13. "Flowers" (Demo) – 5:36 (produced by the Psychedelic Furs)

== Personnel ==
The Psychedelic Furs

- Richard Butler – lead and background vocals
- John Ashton – guitar
- Tim Butler – bass guitar
- Vince Ely – drums
- Roger Morris – guitar
- Duncan Kilburn – saxophones

Technical

- Howard Thompson – executive producer
- Phil Thornalley – engineer
- Steve Lillywhite – producer

== Chart performance ==
Album

Year	Chart	Position
1980	Billboard Pop Albums	140

Singles

Year	Single	Chart	Position
1980	"India/Pulse/We Love You/Flowers"	Billboard Club Play Singles	36
1980	"We Love You"	Billboard Club Play Singles	77
