= Book of Days (The Psychedelic Furs album) =

Studio album by the Psychedelic Furs
- Released: October 1989
- Recorded: May–July 1989
- Studios: Rak, London
- Genre: Alternative rock
- Label: Columbia
- Producers: David M. Allen; the Psychedelic Furs

The Psychedelic Furs chronology
All of This and Nothing (1988)	Book of Days (1989)	World Outside (1991)

Singles from Book of Days
- 1. "Should God Forget" Released: 1989; 2. "House" Released: 1990

Book of Days is the sixth studio album by the English rock band the Psychedelic Furs, released in October 1989 by Columbia Records. It reached No. 74 on the UK Albums Chart and No. 138 on the US Billboard 200.

Two singles were released from the album, "Should God Forget" and "House", which peaked at No. 8 and No. 1, respectively, on the Billboard Modern Rock Tracks chart. "House" also reached No. 90 in the UK Singles Chart.

== Background and production ==
The album was co-produced by David M. Allen who was known for this work with the Cure. Book of Days also marked the return of original band member Vince Ely on drums.. According to Tim Butler & Richard Butler (in an 1989 interview following the albums' release with MTV's 120 Minutes), the album was a deliberate departure from the polished production of Midnight to Midnight. Tim Butler stated: “The last album [Midnight to Midnight] took six months and it was too much of a chance to re-examine and re-record & record the vibe out of it. Whereas with this album [Book of Days] everything was the 3rd or 4th take. [This] has more energy and more life in it then Midnight to Midnight.” In a retrospective interview with Uncut in 2025, Richard Butler expanded on his frame of mind with Book of Days at the time, and the band's intentional move away from pop commercialism: "I was disillusioned with the way the band had gone; it was too commercial-seeming for me, and not what I’d set out to do originally. I felt like we’d betrayed ourselves, or I’d betrayed myself and the band had gone along with it. [...], I remember talking to Muff Winwood at the record company, and saying to him, “I wanna do a record that doesn’t necessarily have any radio-playable singles on it,” and he was like, “Go for it!" That’s what Book of Days was, us kind of redressing the balance, and trying to undo the idea that people were viewing us as this commercial entity."

== Critical reception ==
Professional ratings
Review scores
Source	Rating
AllMusic	3.5/5 stars
Christgau's Record Guide	C+
The Encyclopedia of Popular Music	2/5 stars
The Great Rock Discography	4/10
Melody Maker	favourable
MusicHound Rock	2/5 stars
NME	7/10
Record Mirror	4.5/5
The Rolling Stone Album Guide	2.5/5 stars
Spin Alternative Record Guide	5/10

Upon its release in October 1989, Book of Days initially received mostly positive reviews, with some reviewers praising the harder sounds and 'intensity' of the album, while other reviewers criticized David Allen's production. The St. Petersburg Times noted that "the Furs often sound downright metallic, kicking out churning, noisome arrangements and hard-rock riffs." The Boston Globe deemed the album "dense, murky, agitated, hauntingly pretty and lush in places, generally caustic." The Toronto Star determined that the album "merits the attention of longtime fans, if only for the raw, anxious intensity that has sprung anew in Richard Butler's doom-laden voice." The Chicago Tribune noted, "Book of Days caters to no one. Guitars hover like mist after an acid rain and drums pound out a funeral rhythm, while Tim Butler's booming bass takes the role of lead instrument. For those who loved the bright sounds of 'Heartbreak Beat' and 'Love My Way', the new LP will come as a jolt. But in the dark corners of Book of Days, the Furs sound truly at home." Record Mirror stated, "The FM sheen has been stripped away. Highlights are 'Mother-Son' and 'Should God Forget', with torrential despair as trademark. It's been a while since we've championed the Furs, so let's get straight to it. In '89 the Furs are as hip as they come and a whole lot smarter."

The Spin Alternative Record Guide criticized David M. Allen's "muddy mix," writing that "Butler's voice has never come across so biteless and small." In a retrospective 2005 review, PopMatters gave 'Books of Day's a positive review, stating: "The dense, downcast atmosphere cast a spell. And 16 years later, Book of Days remains one of the Furs’ best albums."

== Track listing ==
All lyrics written by Richard Butler; all music composed by the Psychedelic Furs.

1. "Shine" - 4:03
2. "Entertain Me" - 5:00
3. "Book of Days" - 5:11
4. "Should God Forget" - 4:21
5. "Torch" - 4:49
6. "Parade" - 4:45
7. "Mother-Son" - 4:07
8. "House" - 5:12
9. "Wedding" - 4:19
10. "I Don't Mine" - 3:15

== Personnel ==
The Psychedelic Furs

- Richard Butler - vocals
- Tim Butler - bass guitar
- John Ashton - guitar
- Vince Ely - drums

Additional personnel

- Anthony Thistlethwaite
- Emily Burridge
- Gena Dry
- Jem Finer
- Joe McGinty - keyboards
- John Hymas
- Knox Chandler - guitar

Technical

- Roy Spong - engineer
- Allan D. Martin, Richard Butler - cover design
- Allan D. Martin, Peter Robathan - photography

== Charts ==
Chart (1989/90)	Peak position
Australian Albums (ARIA Charts)	114
UK Albums Chart	74
U.S. Billboard 200	138
