= Richard Butler (album) =

Studio album by Richard Butler
- Released: 18 April 2006
- Studio: Sky High Studio, New York
- Genre: Indie rock
- Label: Koch
- Producer: Jon Carin, Richard Butler

Richard Butler is the debut solo album of Richard Butler. Butler collaborated with Jon Carin on the album. It was released by Koch Records on 18 April 2006. Upon release, the album was met with considerable critical acclaim. The Guardian called it "an unexpected triumph." Popmatters suggests, "This is probably the album that Coldplay will be making a few years down the line." All instruments & engineering by Jon Carin.

== Track listing ==
All lyrics written by Richard Butler; all music composed by Jon Carin; except where indicated

1. "Good Days Bad Days" – 5:24
2. "California" – 5:34
3. "Breathe" – 4:29
4. "Satellites" – 4:06
5. "Broken Aeroplanes" (Butler, Carin, Tim Butler) – 4:46
6. "Milk" – 4:35
7. "Nothing's Wrong" – 6:38
8. "Second to Second" – 4:55
9. "Last Monkey" (Butler, Carin, Butler) – 4:38
10. "Sentimental Airlines" – 5:03
11. "Maybe Someday" – 4:58

== Personnel ==
- Richard Butler - vocals, artwork, associate producer
- Jon Carin - instruments, production, engineer, mixing

Technical

- Richard Dombrowski - art direction
- Elizabeth Yoon - design
- Jimmy Bruch - photography
