= Love My Way (song) =

- UK 12" sleeve

Single by the Psychedelic Furs

from the album Forever Now
- B-side: "Aeroplane"; "Goodbye"
- Released: 2 July 1982
- Recorded: April 1982
- Genre: New wave
- Length: 3:27
- Label: Columbia
- Songwriters: John Ashton; Tim Butler; Richard Butler; Vince Ely
- Producer: Todd Rundgren

The Psychedelic Furs singles chronology
"Pretty in Pink" (1981)	"Love My Way" (1982)	"Run and Run" (1984)

Music video
- "Love My Way" on YouTube

"Love My Way" is a song by the English rock band the Psychedelic Furs. It was released in July 1982 as the first single from their third studio album Forever Now. "Love My Way" was written by the four members of the group and produced by Todd Rundgren, who also played marimba on the song, and features backing vocals from Flo & Eddie. The song reached the top 10 of the charts in New Zealand, top 30 in Australia and the top 50 in the United Kingdom and United States.

== Lyrics ==
The Psychedelic Furs' lead vocalist Richard Butler explained the meaning of the song in an interview with Creem magazine in 1983: "It's basically addressed to people who are fucked up about their sexuality, and says 'Don't worry about it.' It was originally written for gay people."

== Release and reception ==
Released in 1982, "Love My Way" peaked at number nine in New Zealand, where it spent 21 weeks on the chart. The song peaked at number 42 in the UK and number 44 on the U.S. Billboard Hot 100. It also reached number 30 on the US Mainstream Rock chart and number 40 on the Dance Music/Club Play Singles chart.

British filmmaker Tim Pope directed the official music video for "Love My Way" in 1982, and it was placed in regular rotation on MTV.

The single was released in the UK with the non-album B-side, "Aeroplane." In the US, the B-side was changed to a different non-album track, "I Don't Want to Be Your Shadow". Both songs are included on the 2002 reissue of Forever Now.

== Usage in media ==
The song is featured in the 1983 film Valley Girl and appears on the soundtracks of the 1998 film The Wedding Singer, and the 2006 film Starter for 10. After it was heard in the 2017 film Call Me by Your Name, the song enjoyed a surge in streaming popularity. It was also featured in the 2002 video game Grand Theft Auto: Vice City.

== Track listing ==
7" vinyl

1. "Love My Way" – 3:30
2. "Aeroplane" – 3:22

12" vinyl

1. "Love My Way" – 3:33
2. "Goodbye" (dance mix) – 5:45
3. "Aeroplane" (dance mix) – 5:22

== Chart performance ==
Chart (1982–1983)	Peak position
Australia Kent Music Report	23
New Zealand RIANZ Singles Chart	9
UK Singles (Official Charts)	42
US Billboard Hot 100	44
US Cashbox Top 100	41
US Mainstream Rock Airplay (Billboard)	30
US Dance Music/Club Play	40
