= Until She Comes =

Single by The Psychedelic Furs

from the album World Outside
- Released: June 1991
- Genre: Alternative rock
- Length: 3:50
- Label: Columbia
- Songwriter: The Psychedelic Furs
- Producers: Stephen Street, the Psychedelic Furs

The Psychedelic Furs singles chronology
| "House" (1990) | "Until She Comes" (1991) | "Don't Be a Girl" (1991) |

"Until She Comes" is a 1991 song by the English rock band the Psychedelic Furs, taken from their seventh studio album, World Outside. Written by the Psychedelic Furs and produced by the band with Stephen Street, it was released in June as the album's first single. The 12" version included a remix by Hugh Padgham.

== Composition and critical reception ==
The lyrics of "Until She Comes" depict a metaphorical story about drug addiction. The single spent two weeks at No. 1 on the US Modern Rock Tracks chart in September 1991. Author Dave Thompson described the song as "bittersweet" and reminiscent of the band's 1981 single "Pretty in Pink".

== Track listing ==
7" vinyl

1. "Until She Comes" - 3:38
2. "Make It Mine" - 3:55

CD single, 12" vinyl

1. "Until She Comes" - 3:50
2. "Make It Mine" - 3:57
3. "Sometimes" - 4:14
4. "Until She Comes (Remix)" - 4:00

== Chart performance ==
| Chart (1991) | Peak position |
|---|---|
| U.S. Modern Rock Tracks | 1 |
