= Heaven (The Psychedelic Furs song) =

Single by the Psychedelic Furs

from the album Mirror Moves
- B-side: "Heartbeat"
- Released: March 1984
- Recorded: 1984
- Genre: Pop rock
- Length: 3:27
- Label: Columbia
- Songwriters: Tim Butler; Richard Butler
- Producer: Keith Forsey

The Psychedelic Furs singles chronology
| "Run and Run" (1982) | "Heaven" (1984) | "The Ghost in You" (1984) |

Music video
- "Heaven" on YouTube

"Heaven" is a song by the English rock band the Psychedelic Furs, written by the band's lead vocalist Richard Butler and bassist Tim Butler. It was released in March 1984 by Columbia Records, as the first single from the band's fourth studio album, Mirror Moves (1984). As a single it reached the top 30 of the charts on the UK singles chart and peaked at No. 41 in New Zealand.

== Release and critical reception ==
Released in March 1984, "Heaven" entered the UK singles chart in April 1984, peaked at No. 29, and spent five weeks in the chart. The song reached No. 41 in New Zealand. British film director Tim Pope directed the song's official music video.

AllMusic critic Bill Janovitz called it a "gorgeous pop song", and praised Richard Butler for being "remarkably expressive in his phrasing and in his extraordinary voice". Janovitz credited producer Keith Forsey for striking a balance of pop music and punk rock influences on the track.

"Heaven" was covered by the American alternative rock band Buffalo Tom for their second studio album Birdbrain (1990), Eurythmics' singer Annie Lennox on the Japanese edition of her second solo studio album Medusa (1995), Face to Face on their fourth studio album Standards & Practices (1999), Alkaline Trio on the compilation album Another Year on the Streets, Vol. 3 (2004), Nouvelle Vague on their third studio album 3 (2009), and Sunscreem on their 2018 album, Out of the Woods.

== Track listing ==
7" Single

1. "Heaven" – 3:27
2. "Heartbeat" (remix) – 5:10

12" Single

1. "Heaven" (full version) – 4:25
2. "Heartbeat" (New York remix) – 8:09

== Chart performance ==
| Chart (1984) | Peak position |
|---|---|
| UK singles chart | 29 |
| New Zealand RIANZ Singles Chart | 41 |
