= Forever Now (The Psychedelic Furs album) =

- UK release cover

Studio album by the Psychedelic Furs
- Released: 24 September 1982
- Recorded: April – May 1982
- Studio: Utopia Sound (Lake Hill, New York)
- Genre: New wave
- Length: 40:57
- Label: CBS
- Producer: Todd Rundgren

The Psychedelic Furs chronology
Talk Talk Talk (1981)	Forever Now (1982)	Mirror Moves (1984)

Alternative cover
- US release cover

Singles from Forever Now
- 1. "Love My Way" Released: July 1982; 2. "Danger (remix)" Released: 1982; 3. "Run and Run" Released: 1983

Forever Now is the third studio album by the English rock band the Psychedelic Furs. The 10-song album, including the hit single "Love My Way", was recorded in the spring of 1982 and released on 24 September of that year by Columbia/CBS. A 20th-anniversary reissue included six related bonus tracks.

The album represented a turning point in the musical maturation of the band, after a turbulent period of personnel changes in which they shrank from a six-man ensemble to a quartet. Working with the Furs for the first time, Todd Rundgren placed his own sonic imprint upon the album as producer and guest musician. Rundgren also added instrumentation to the band's sound, including cello and marimba, and recruited backing vocalists Flo & Eddie.

== Background ==
In the year after the recording of their second album, Talk Talk Talk (1981), the Psychedelic Furs underwent a tumultuous time of change and, in the words of the guitarist John Ashton, "a bit of a dark period in the band's history". Two of the original members – the saxophonist Duncan Kilburn and the guitarist Roger Morris – abruptly and rancorously left. The band's main patrons at CBS Records had largely left the company by this time, and their successful recent producer, Steve Lillywhite, was now unavailable to them. Even the drummer Vince Ely's commitment to the band seemed to be in question. Not only had their large ensemble been unexpectedly reduced to a traditional four-piece band, but now the core members of Ashton, Tim Butler and Richard Butler mostly had to compose new songs without drums, using a Casio VL-1 synthesizer until they had developed enough music for an album.

== Choice of record producer ==
When the time came to return to a recording studio, the band sought out a new record producer. Lillywhite, who had done the work for both of their previous albums, had other commitments, and many in the band felt it was time to chart a new course anyway. Columbia management first attempted to match the band with David Bowie, who was a high-profile Furs supporter and who expressed enthusiasm for working with them. Bowie, however, also had commitments which would have postponed work for what the band felt would be an unacceptably long time. More importantly, there was a belief among some band members that this partnership would not yield much of a change. According to Richard Butler, "the media were already making lots of comparisons between our music and his", and the band did not want to appear too indebted. A last-minute offer by Lillywhite to fit the band into his schedule was politely declined.

It was Ely who first suggested the American producer Todd Rundgren. The band members gathered for an exploratory visit to his Utopia Sound studio in upstate New York, where Rundgren, who was already a fan of the Furs' music, quickly signed onto the project.

The partnership with Rundgren – an established figure, known for his work on major label successes like Meat Loaf's Bat Out of Hell – was derided by some as the inevitable "pop sellout", but others saw it as a positive development, even a "major production coup". The band members themselves were pleased with Rundgren's assistance, and have expressed pride in the results and gratitude for the experience.

== Recording ==
Rundgren invited the band to move their recording sessions from his commercial space into the private studios in his own home in Lake Hill, New York. Recording was completed there over a six-week period in April and May 1982.

Rundgren enhanced the Furs' sound by adding new elements to their musical arrangements – along with his own varied musical contributions, Rundgren brought in session musicians to augment the band. Gary Windo was a renowned saxophonist in the jazz world who had in recent years collaborated with major rock acts like Ian Hunter and Nick Mason. Extra horn work was contributed by Donn Adams, a longtime player with the American rock band NRBQ. A classical cellist, Ann Sheldon, was recruited from the Royal College of Music. Lastly, the seasoned backing vocal team of Flo & Eddie were called in by Rundgren to round out many of the songs.

The instrumentalists had all been accepted by the band willingly, even enthusiastically; the backing vocalists, however, were another matter. Flo & Eddie (Howard Kaylan and Mark Volman) arrived at the end of recording time when the band thought all the tracks were finalised. When they learned of the vocal duo's purpose, "they weren't really up for it," said Kaylan; the two veterans "represented establishment ... [W]e literally felt like, for the first time as session guys, we were proving ourselves". In the end, however, the band members warmed to the pair, and concluded a successful session. "We did the three or four cuts that Todd had brought us up to do, and we shook hands with everybody", Kaylan recalled, but as they were preparing to leave, Rundgren asked them to listen to the album's planned single. After "Love My Way" played, Kaylan and Volman excitedly insisted that they be allowed to record some vocals for it. "We have got to sing on this one," Kaylan recalls thinking. "If we don't sing on this one, we're not gonna sing on the hit. This is the fucking hit!" The background vocals that Flo & Eddie ultimately contributed ended up being considered one of the highlights of their lengthy career.

Rundgren also made musical contributions of his own, including marimba on "Love My Way" and saxophone on "No Easy Street", but his primary goal as producer was "helping the band focus their potential". His more unorthodox methods included climbing to the roof of the studio and dropping lit firecrackers near the unsuspecting band when "we were sort of playing a little sluggishly", as Tim Butler recalled. By his various means, Rundgren motivated the players to create, and by his well-known personal style of power pop-inflected "wall of sound" production, he restored the band's "thick, viscous smear of guitars, drums and vocals".

== Music ==
Forever Now fused the Furs' post-punk aesthetic with Rundgren's power pop engineering to dramatic effect. Its songwriting style was prototypically gothic, "firmly planted in the minor tones". "I think it was the peak of our psychedelicness", remarked Tim Butler, who also called the album his favourite of his career.

Much of the album had been composed and committed to demo form before the band arrived at Rundgren's studio, but the producer felt that the first crop of tunes was insufficient. He expected a full working album worth of songs to be ready, whereas the Furs believed that their creative process had always flourished best inside a studio. He postponed recording while the Furs made additional demos. British keyboardist and future music producer Ed Buller helped to create many of the demos made before the band returned. Although never an official member of the Furs, Buller supplied much-needed musical accompaniment at this stage, and would go on to collaborate frequently with the band over the next six years. When the second batch arrived, Rundgren made major revisions and even dropped some tracks entirely. By necessity then, some songs were revised or fully composed in the studio.

One of the late-coming compositions was "Sleep Comes Down", which was written during pre-album rehearsals. The song incorporated irregular time changes – lilting and "sweetly woozy" – and a surging, psychedelic outro, and became a fan favourite. Other prominent tracks on the album include the overtly political rocker "President Gas"; and "Danger" which, with its "headlong pace and slamming beat", was described by critic Ken Tucker as "the most ferocious, impassioned song the Furs have ever recorded". The album's title track has been cited as a foremost example of Rundgren's "wall of sound" technique.

The album also includes one of the Furs' most well-known songs, "Love My Way". Although it was critically acclaimed as a "brilliant single", it turned out to be only a moderate hit, peaking at No. 44 on the US Billboard Hot 100 and No. 42 in the UK Singles Chart. The song has nonetheless had an enduring afterlife – it has appeared in movie soundtracks like The Wedding Singer, Valley Girl, and Call Me by Your Name; in video games, including Rock Band and Grand Theft Auto: Vice City; and in a wide variety of genre compilation albums. Ashton specifically accords Buller credit as the creator of the memorable keyboard riff on "Love My Way". This was the riff that would ultimately be played by Rundgren on a marimba, in what's been called the best use of that instrument in rock music "since the Stones' 'Under My Thumb'". Rundgren also left his mark on the song's vocal line, persuading Richard Butler to forego his usual "sarcastic tone" and instead "sing it straight".

== Artwork ==
The original UK album release featured psychedelic cover art by the English artist Barney Bubbles (aka Colin Fulcher, 1942–1983), who was later recognised as one of the key pioneers of modern album cover design. Initial UK pressings of the album included a free poster of the Bubbles cover art.

When it was released in the US in 1982, the record label changed the artwork to a simpler, red-tinted design – "this horrible 'new-wave'-looking generic cover", in Ashton's view. Richard Butler says that when he first saw the replacement cover, he "actually burst into tears". Ostensibly Columbia decreed the change to increase legibility of the band's name, and perhaps to mimic the design of the previous album, Talk Talk Talk.

== Release ==
Forever Now was released on 25 September 1982. The single "Love My Way" had already been released in the UK in July with the non-album B-side "Aeroplane". The album also included a studio version of "Danger", which was released as a second single in a club remix version, available only in the UK. In the US, "Love My Way" – the band's first-ever single in the American market – was held until October to coincide with the kickoff of the band's North American tour, and it was paired with a new non-album B-side, "I Don't Want to Be Your Shadow". In May 1983, shortly after the tour's conclusion, "Run and Run" was selected to be the second US single (backed by a live version of "President Gas") but it did not enter the charts.

=== Reissues ===
Forever Now was reissued in the US and UK in 2002 by Columbia/Legacy. As with the simultaneous reissues of The Psychedelic Furs and Talk Talk Talk, this release used the original UK album cover art (though using the original US release track listing). The CD included six songs previously unavailable on album: "Aeroplane", "Alice's House", "I Don't Want to Be Your Shadow", an alternative version of "Yes I Do" renamed "Mary Go Round", and live versions of "President Gas" and "No Easy Street". Lengthy new liner notes were added by the music journalist Tony Fletcher.

The album was reissued on vinyl by Vinyl180 in the UK in 2011 without bonus content. This reissue extended the original Barney Bubbles cover art to a gatefold record sleeve.

== Promotion ==
In support of the album, the Furs launched a concert tour beginning in the UK, with their 10 October 1982 performance at the Hammersmith Odeon broadcast live on BBC Radio One. The tour included session players Sheldon and Windo, as well as Buller on keyboards. One person who did not come with them was Ely, whose long-simmering dissatisfaction with the band finally led to his departure, just after the album's recording was completed. Ely was replaced as drummer by Phill Calvert, formerly of the Birthday Party.

They toured the US in November and December, with a holiday break at the end. When the tour resumed in January, Windo was unable to make the next leg to Australia and New Zealand, so the band arranged for the saxophonist Mars Williams to take his place. The Furs returned to the US on 6 March 1983 and toured again until the end of April.

Official music videos for three songs were produced in 1982. The "Love My Way" video was directed by Tim Pope, and was placed in regular rotation on MTV. Additional videos were shot for "Run and Run" and "Sleep Comes Down", and the latter – despite not being released as a single – received considerable MTV airplay as well.

== Critical reception ==
Professional ratings
Review scores
Source	Rating
AllMusic	4.5/5 stars
Entertainment Weekly	B
Q	4/5 stars
Rolling Stone	3/5 stars
The Rolling Stone Album Guide	4/5 stars
Sounds	4/5 stars
The Village Voice	A−

The album jumped to its peak position of No. 20 on the UK album charts in early October. In the US, it moved more slowly and reached its peak of No. 61 in April 1983, spending 32 weeks on the Billboard charts. In Canada, it topped out at No. 83, while in New Zealand it hit No. 4 in its first week of release.

A contemporary review in Trouser Press praised the Furs for their "increased sophistication" as songwriters and musicians. The album was described as both "alluring and amusing" in Rolling Stone, and music critic Robert Christgau graded it with an "A−" rating in The Village Voice. The Boston Phoenix said that "for the first time the Furs successfully invoke every element of the lineage they define: mid-60s Beatles meet early Velvets as reinterpreted by descendants of [David] Bowie and contemporaries of the Sex Pistols."

Some reviews at the time were less receptive. In a more reserved review for Rolling Stone, Ken Tucker wrote that "although most of Forever Now is alluring and amusing, only once does the band come up with something really new."

Later assessments of the album have been more positive in their reception. Writing for AllMusic, Ned Raggett effusively called it "simply fantastic" while Stylus Magazine looked back on it as "the Furs' masterpiece".

== Track listing ==
All songs written by Richard Butler, John Ashton, Tim Butler and Vince Ely.

=== Original UK LP release ===
Side A

1. "President Gas" – 5:09
2. "Love My Way" – 3:26
3. "Run and Run" – 3:43
4. "Merry-Go-Round" – 3:44
5. "Sleep Comes Down" – 3:43

Side B

1. "Forever Now" – 5:25
2. "Danger" – 2:32
3. "You and I" – 4:15
4. "Goodbye" – 3:47
5. "No Easy Street" – 3:54

=== Original US LP release ===
Side A

1. "Forever Now" – 5:35
2. "Love My Way" – 3:33
3. "Goodbye" – 3:55
4. "Only You and I" – 4:24
5. "Sleep Comes Down" – 3:51

Side B

1. "President Gas" – 5:35
2. "Run and Run" – 3:48
3. "Danger" – 2:37
4. "No Easy Street" – 4:04
5. "Yes I Do" – 3:54

=== 2002 CD reissue ===
Features the US track order, plus six bonus tracks:

1. "Forever Now" – 5:35
2. "Love My Way" – 3:33
3. "Goodbye" – 3:55
4. "Only You and I" – 4:24
5. "Sleep Comes Down" – 3:51
6. "President Gas" – 5:35
7. "Run and Run" – 3:48
8. "Danger" – 2:37
9. "No Easy Street" – 4:04
10. "Yes I Do (Merry-Go-Round)" – 3:54

Bonus tracks

1. "Alice's House" (early version) – 4:18
2. "Aeroplane" (non-LP B-side) – 3:26
3. "I Don't Want to Be Your Shadow" (non-LP B-side) – 3:50
4. "Mary Go Round" (previously unreleased version of "Yes I Do") – 3:53
5. "President Gas" (Live) (non-LP B-side) – 5:15
6. "No Easy Street" (Live) – 5:38

== Personnel ==
The Psychedelic Furs

- Richard Butler – vocals
- John Ashton – guitars
- Tim Butler – bass guitar
- Vince Ely – drums

Additional personnel

- Todd Rundgren – keyboards, marimba; saxophone on "No Easy Street"
- Gary Windo – horns
- Donn Adams – horns
- Ann Sheldon – cello
- Flo & Eddie (Mark Volman and Howard Kaylan) – backing vocals

Technical

- Chris Andersen, Todd Rundgren – engineers
- Barney Bubbles – UK cover design
- Chris Austopchuk – US cover design
- Antoine Giacomoni, Marcia Resnick, Graeme Attwood – photography

== Charts ==
Album

Year	Country	Chart	Peak position
1982	UK	Official Charts	20
1982	Australia	Kent Music Report	49
1983	US	Billboard Pop Albums	61
1983	Canada	RPM Top Albums	83
1982	New Zealand	RMNZ Albums	4
1982	Sweden	Swedish Charts: Albums	35

== Certifications ==
Organization	Level	Date
RIAA – USA	Gold	May 28, 1991
