= World Outside =

1991 studio album by the Psychedelic Furs

Studio album by the Psychedelic Furs
- Released: 1 July 1991
- Recorded: 1990−91
- Genre: Alternative rock; art rock; pop
- Label: Columbia
- Producer: Stephen Street; the Psychedelic Furs

The Psychedelic Furs chronology
Book of Days (1989)	World Outside (1991)	Here Came the Psychedelic Furs: B Sides and Lost Grooves (1994)

Singles from World Outside
- 1. "Until She Comes" Released: 1991; 2. "Don't Be a Girl" Released: 1991

World Outside is the seventh studio album by the English rock band the Psychedelic Furs, released on 1 July 1991 by Columbia Records in the US. It includes the single "Until She Comes", which hit No. 1 on the US Modern Rock Tracks chart in September 1991. "Don't Be a Girl" was the second single.

== Production ==
Completed in seven weeks, the album was produced by Stephen Street and the band. Knox Chandler contributed on guitar. The three core band members tried to be more open to collaborating with the additional musicians, rather than always directing how songs should be played. The band started recording a week after their tour for Book of Days ended, and used few overdubs. Singer Richard Butler constructed lyrics that were more personal than on previous albums. He decided to use cello on some tracks after growing tired of employing a saxophone. "All About You" was edited down from two jams that totaled 30 minutes.

== Critical reception ==
Professional ratings
Review scores
Source	Rating
AllMusic	3/5 stars
Calgary Herald	D
Chicago Tribune	2/4 stars
Los Angeles Times	3/5 stars
Rolling Stone	3/5 stars
The Rolling Stone Album Guide	2.5/5 stars
St. Petersburg Times	3/5 stars
Spin Alternative Record Guide	3/10

The Los Angeles Times wrote that "there is once more the bracing tension of understated melodic elegance scraping against understated musical discord." The Ottawa Citizen determined that the band "maintains the most irresistible aspects of its art-rock sound including the melancholy underbelly, but it also focuses them into a commanding pop songs." The Calgary Herald opined that "Richard sings wearily of romance in ruins... It's all so shoulder-shrugging boring."

The Globe and Mail deemed the album "a crafty return to the edgy, intelligent rock of its earliest incarnation." The Boston Globe called it "B-level pop songs." The Vancouver Sun panned the "sameness in synth sounds, sameness in melodies, sameness in meter." The Times concluded that "the album is leavened by a significantly keener sense of melody and somehow pulled into focus by the context of the times."

The Wisconsin State Journal listed the album as one of the 10 best of 1991.

== Track listing ==
All songs written by the Psychedelic Furs.

1. "Valentine" – 4:47
2. "In My Head" – 3:30
3. "Until She Comes" – 3:50
4. "Don't Be a Girl" – 3:46
5. "Sometimes" – 4:14
6. "Tearing Down" – 5:22
7. "There's a World" – 4:45
8. "Get a Room" – 3:45
9. "Better Days" – 4:32
10. "All About You" – 4:01

== Personnel ==
The Psychedelic Furs

- Richard Butler – vocals
- John Ashton – guitar
- Tim Butler – bass

Additional personnel

- Don Yallech – drums
- Knox Chandler – guitar
- Joe McGinty – keyboards

== Charts ==
Chart (1991)	Peak position
Australian Albums (ARIA Charts)	108
UK Albums Chart	68
