= Mirror Moves =

Studio album by the Psychedelic Furs
- Released: 6 May 1984
- Recorded: 1983–1984
- Studios: Westlake, Los Angeles; Electric Lady, New York City; Record Plant, New York City
- Genres: New wave; pop rock; synth-pop
- Length: 37:27
- Label: Columbia
- Producer: Keith Forsey

The Psychedelic Furs chronology
Forever Now (1982)	Mirror Moves (1984)	Midnight to Midnight (1987)

Singles from Mirror Moves
- 1. "Heaven" Released: March 1984; 2. "The Ghost in You" Released: May 1984; 3. "Here Come Cowboys" Released: 1984; 4. "Heartbeat" Released: 1984

Professional ratings
Review scores
Source	Rating
AllMusic	4/5 stars
The Encyclopedia of Popular Music	3/5 stars
The Great Rock Discography	6/10
MusicHound Rock	4/5 stars
Record Mirror	3/5 stars
Rolling Stone	2/5 stars
The Rolling Stone Album Guide	3/5 stars
Smash Hits	9/10
Spin Alternative Record Guide	8/10
The Village Voice	B+

Mirror Moves is the fourth studio album by the English rock band the Psychedelic Furs, released on 6 May 1984 by Columbia Records, two years after their previous studio album, Forever Now.

The album includes the dance hit "Heartbeat" and the chart hits "Heaven" and "The Ghost in You". "Here Come Cowboys" was also released as a single and received substantial airplay on MTV.

Furs drummer Vince Ely had left the band, leaving lead vocalist Richard Butler, bassist Tim Butler and guitarist John Ashton to work as a trio. Producer Keith Forsey handled the majority of the drumming on the album, with session musician Thommy Price playing on two tracks. The cover artwork and design was a tribute to artist Barney Bubbles, who had died the previous year. He was acknowledged in the credits with the words "after Barney Bubbles".

Mirror Moves became their second album to be certified gold in the US.

In 1985, during the promotion of The Head on the Door, Robert Smith of the Cure cited Mirror Moves as one of his five favorite albums.

== Track listing ==
Side one
No.	Title	Writer(s)	Length
1.	"The Ghost in You"	Richard Butler; Tim Butler	4:17
2.	"Here Come Cowboys"	R. Butler; T. Butler	3:55
3.	"Heaven"	R. Butler; T. Butler	3:27
4.	"Heartbeat"	John Ashton; R. Butler	5:17

Side two
No.	Title	Writer(s)	Length
5.	"My Time"	Ashton; R. Butler	4:27
6.	"Like a Stranger"	R. Butler; T. Butler	4:00
7.	"Alice's House"	R. Butler; Ashton; T. Butler; Vince Ely	3:53
8.	"Only a Game"	Ashton; R. Butler	4:13
9.	"Highwire Days"	Ashton; R. Butler	3:58
Total length:			37:27

== Personnel ==
The Psychedelic Furs

- Richard Butler – lead and background vocals
- John Ashton – guitar
- Tim Butler – bass guitar

Additional personnel

- Thommy Price – drums on tracks 2 and 3
- Mars Williams – saxophone
- Keith Forsey – drum machine; drums; percussion
- Ed Buller – keyboards (uncredited)

Production and artwork

- Keith Forsey – producer
- Steve Hodge – engineer
- Richard Butler – cover design
- Da Gama – cover design
- Brian Griffin – photography

== Charts ==
=== Weekly charts ===
Chart (1984–85)	Peak position
Australian Albums (Kent Music Report)	97
Canada Top Albums/CDs (RPM)	16
New Zealand Albums (RMNZ)	5
Swedish Albums (Sverigetopplistan)	29
US Billboard 200	43

=== Year-end charts ===
Chart (1984)	Position
New Zealand Albums (RMNZ)	39

== Certifications ==
Region	Certification	Certified units/sales
Canada (Music Canada)	Gold	50,000^{^}
United States (RIAA)	Gold	500,000^{^}
^{^} Shipments figures based on certification alone.
