= Pretty in Pink (song) =

Single by The Psychedelic Furs

from the album Talk Talk Talk
- B-side: "Mack the Knife"; "Soap Commercial"; "Love My Way" (remix)
- Released: 1981 (original version); 1986 (re-recorded version)
- Recorded: 1981 (original version); 1986 (re-recorded version)
- Genre: New wave; post-punk; pop rock
- Length: 3:57 (1981 version); 3:53 (1986 single version); 4:40 (1986 album soundtrack version)
- Label: Columbia
- Songwriters: John Ashton, Tim Butler, Richard Butler, Vince Ely, Duncan Kilburn, Roger Morris
- Producers: Steve Lillywhite (1981 version); Charles Harrowell (1986 version)

The Psychedelic Furs singles chronology
"Dumb Waiters" (1981)	"Pretty in Pink" (1981)	"Love My Way" (1982)

The Psychedelic Furs singles chronology
"Here Come Cowboys" (1984)	"Pretty in Pink" (1986)	"Heartbreak Beat" (1987)

"Pretty in Pink" is a song by the English band the Psychedelic Furs, originally released in 1981 as a single from the band's second album, Talk Talk Talk. The 1986 film was named after the song and a re-recorded version of the song was included on its soundtrack.

== Composition ==
Lead singer Richard Butler said "Pretty in Pink" is about two women he knew while living in Muswell Hill in North London. One was a friend of his ex-girlfriend, and the other went to a pub he frequented. However, the Caroline mentioned in the lyrics is a made-up name, and the women are not high-school age, despite the film that was named after the song, causing some people to think so. "The song is about a girl who sleeps around a lot and thinks that she's popular because of it. It makes her feel empowered somehow and popular, and in fact, the people that she's sleeping with are laughing about her behind her back and talking about her," said Butler.

== Release and critical reception ==
The original version of "Pretty in Pink" peaked at No. 43 on the UK singles chart in July 1981. AllMusic writer Bill Janovitz credited producer Steve Lillywhite for finding "the ideal sound for the band, with a perfect blend of classic pop, punk, and art rock elements". Janovitz called it "the definitive take" of the song.

The 1986 version reached No. 18 in the UK and narrowly missed the Top 40 on the United States Billboard Hot 100 chart, peaking at No. 41.

== Track listing ==
7" vinyl (1981)

1. "Pretty in Pink" – 3:57
2. "Mack the Knife" – 4:18

12" vinyl (1981)

1. "Pretty in Pink" – 3:57
2. "Mack the Knife" – 4:18
3. "Soap Commercial" – 2:55

7" vinyl (1986) – UK, Japan

1. "Pretty in Pink" – 3:53
2. "Love My Way" (US remix) – 3:38

7" vinyl (1986) – US, Europe

1. "Pretty in Pink" – 4:01
2. "Pretty in Pink" (dub) – 3:21

12" vinyl (1986)

1. "Pretty in Pink" – 4:01
2. "Pretty in Pink" – 3:21
3. "Love My Way" (US remix) – 3:38

== Chart performance ==
Chart (1981)	Peak position
UK singles chart	43
Chart (1986)	Peak position
UK singles chart	18
US Billboard Hot 100	41
US Cash Box Top 100	42
Canada	61
