= The Psychedelic Furs =

British post punk band

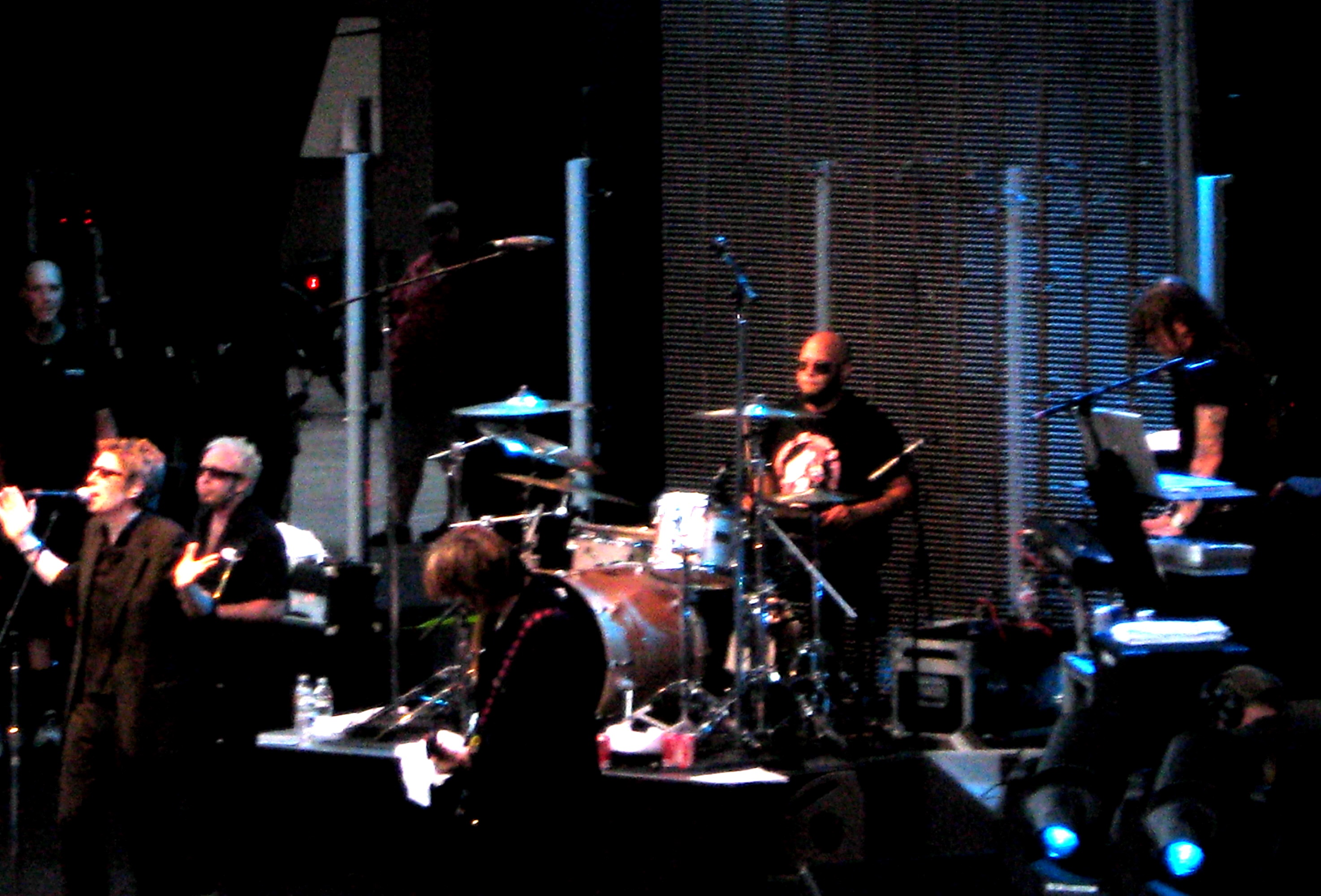
- The Psychedelic Furs performing live in 2008

Background information
- Origin: London, England
- Genres: Post-punk; new wave; alternative rock; punk rock; pop rock
- Years active: 1977–1992, 2000–present
- Labels: Columbia; Sony Music; Legacy; Cooking Vinyl
- Spinoffs: Love Spit Love
- Members: Richard Butler; Tim Butler; Amanda Kramer; Rich Good; Zack Alford; Peter DiStefano
- Past members: Duncan Kilburn; Roger Morris; Mars Williams; John Ashton; Vince Ely; Paul Garisto
- Website: thepsychedelicfurs.com

The Psychedelic Furs are an English rock band founded in London in February 1977. Led by lead vocalist Richard Butler and his brother Tim Butler on bass guitar, the Psychedelic Furs are one of the many acts spawned from the British post-punk scene.

The band had several hits in their early career. In 1986, filmmaker John Hughes used their song "Pretty in Pink" for his film Pretty in Pink. They went on hiatus after they finished touring in 1992, but resumed in 2000 and continue to perform live. The band released Made of Rain, their first studio album in nearly three decades, on 31 July 2020.

== Career ==
=== Early days (1977–1980) ===
Richard Butler stated that the Psychedelic Furs began rehearsing in his family's front room but were soon banished because of the noise. The band was initially called RKO, then Radio. They later vacillated between calling themselves the Europeans and the Psychedelic Furs, playing gigs under both names before permanently settling on the latter. The word psychedelic was chosen to separate the band from punk rockers who ostentatiously scorned the legacy of 1960s rock music.

The band initially consisted of Richard Butler (vocals), Tim Butler (bass guitar), Duncan Kilburn (saxophone), Paul Wilson (drums), and Roger Morris (guitars). By 1979, this line-up had expanded to a sextet with Vince Ely replacing Wilson on drums and John Ashton joining as a second guitarist. The Psychedelic Furs' debut, a self-titled album released in March 1980, was produced by Steve Lillywhite. The album quickly established the band on radio in Europe and was a No. 18 hit in the UK Albums Chart. The album also found success in Germany, Italy, France, Spain and Australia.

=== Success (1981–1991) ===
The Furs found success in the US with their next release, 1981's Talk Talk Talk, which saw the band making its debut on the US Billboard 200 chart. In the UK, the album yielded two charting singles, "Dumb Waiters" and the original version of "Pretty in Pink". The latter song served as inspiration for the 1986 John Hughes film Pretty in Pink and was re-recorded for the platinum-selling Pretty in Pink soundtrack – though Richard Butler was later adamant that the cinematic interpretation had very little to do with the song's original intent.

In 1982, the band was reduced to a quartet with the departures of Morris and Kilburn and moved to the U.S. in search of a producer. The band recorded their next album, Forever Now, with record producer Todd Rundgren in Woodstock, New York. Released in September 1982, this album contained "Love My Way", which became another UK chart entry, and also their first US Billboard Hot 100 single.

Ely left the band after Forever Now (though he would later return in 1988). The next album, Mirror Moves was produced by Keith Forsey (who also programmed the drums and became the band's drummer) and featured the songs "The Ghost in You" and "Heaven". Both charted in the UK and "Heaven" became the band's highest charting UK hit at the time, peaking at No. 29. Columbia Records opted for "Here Come Cowboys" for the corresponding US release which failed to chart but "The Ghost In You" was a hit on the Billboard Hot 100. In Canada, "The Ghost In You" also charted. Mirror Moves became a Top 20 album on the Canadian Albums Chart and was named the No. 1 album of 1984 by Toronto new wave radio station CFNY.

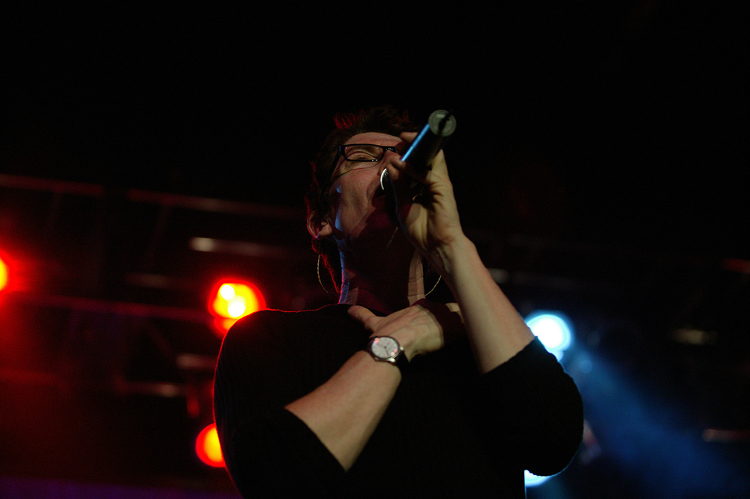
Richard Butler in 2006

By the mid-1980s, the band had become a staple on both US college radio and modern rock radio stations. Simultaneously, they were experiencing consistent mainstream success placing several singles in the charts on both sides of the Atlantic. Still, according to biographer Dave Thompson, they would "have more impact on future musicians than they ever did in the marketplace."

In 1986, the band recorded a new version of "Pretty in Pink" for the film soundtrack. Released as a single, it became their biggest hit to date in the US and their biggest UK hit. Butler later claimed that the success of "Pretty in Pink" caused the band to be pressured into entering the recording studio with producer Chris Kimsey to record a follow-up release before they were ready. The result was Midnight to Midnight, their biggest Top 40 success to date, but an album that Richard Butler later characterised as "hollow, vapid and weak". A more overtly commercial effort than their prior recordings, the album also featured the single "Heartbreak Beat", the Furs' biggest Top 40 hit in the US. The album also featured drummer Paul Garisto and saxophonist Mars Williams, both of whom toured with the band.

In the wake of Midnight to Midnight, Ely returned, and the Furs issued the single "All That Money Wants", a track recorded for the 1988 best-of compilation album All of This and Nothing. 1989's Book of Days, produced by the band and David M. Allen, featured the singles "Should God Forget" and "House". Produced by the band and Stephen Street, 1991's World Outside included the single "Until She Comes" and was the Furs' final studio album for nearly three decades. From 1988 on, the Furs' singles had steady chart success with three No. 1 hits on the newly established US Modern Rock Tracks chart between 1988 and 1991. "All That Money Wants" was a No. 1 hit in 1988, while "House" topped the chart in 1990 and "Until She Comes" was No. 1 in 1991.

=== Hiatus and reunion (2000–present) ===
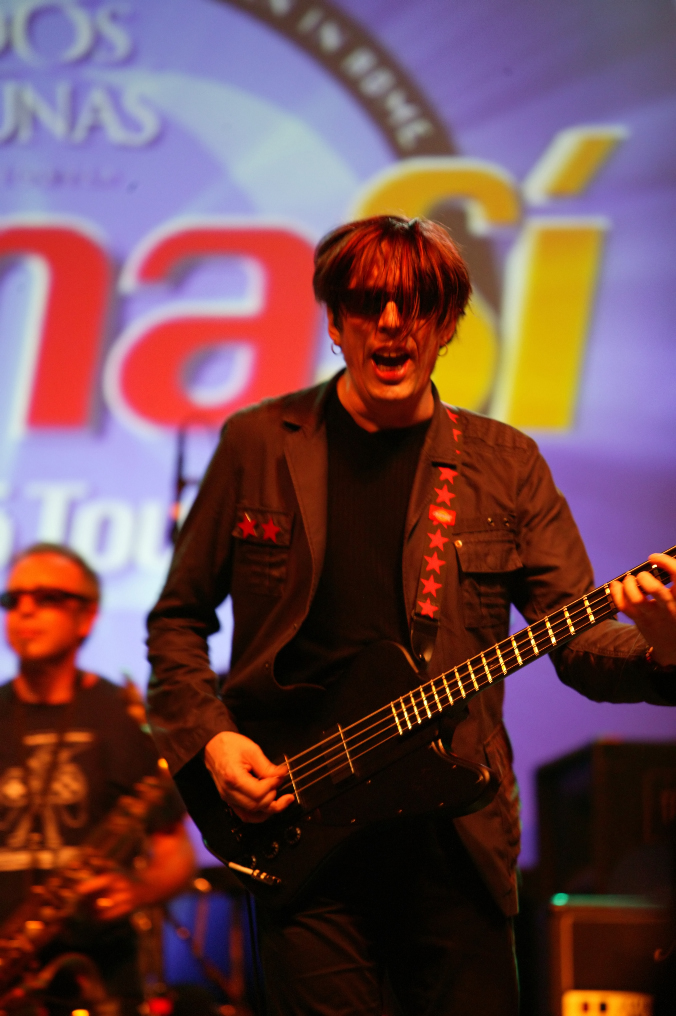
Tim Butler in 2006

The band took a long break in the early 1990s, with Richard and Tim Butler going on to found Love Spit Love with Richard Fortus and Frank Ferrer (both of whom would later join Guns N' Roses). In 2000, Richard Butler, Tim Butler, and Ashton reformed the Psychedelic Furs. The touring lineup also included Fortus and, later, Ferrer. They released a live album, Beautiful Chaos: Greatest Hits Live , which included a new studio recording, "Alive (For Once in My Lifetime)".

In 2006, Richard Butler released a solo album, Richard Butler. Since re-forming in 2001, the band continued to tour worldwide. The current Psychedelic Furs touring line-up includes Richard Butler, Tim Butler, Zack Alford, Amanda Kramer, and Rich Good.

In 2017, the band's 1984 single "The Ghost in You" was featured in the second season of Netflix hit series Stranger Things and was included on the Sony Music soundtrack companion to the season, Stranger Things: Music from the Netflix Original Series, released in October 2017. That same year, the band's 1982 single "Love My Way" was played several times in the Oscar-nominated film Call Me by Your Name.

The Psychedelic Furs released their eighth studio album Made of Rain on 31 July 2020 to positive reviews. This release marked the first full-length studio album by the band since 1991's World Outside. It became the band's second-highest charting UK Album ever and featured at the end-of-year Best Albums roundup in Mojo, Uncut, Classic Pop, ABC's Good Morning America, and Vive Le Rock among others. "Don't Believe", the first single from the album was released on 20 January 2020. It was followed by "You'll Be Mine", "No-One" and "Come All Ye Faithful", each with an official video. On 1 March 2021, the band released the official video for Made of Rain's fifth single, "Wrong Train". It premiered exclusively on NME.com and was inspired by Richard Butler's paintings. He starred in the video himself. The Strokes' Grammy Award-winning album The New Abnormal (2020) featured the song "Eternal Summer" which quotes the Furs' "The Ghost in You", for which songwriters Richard and Tim Butler received songwriting credits.

On 1 September 2021, two weeks before the Made of Rain Tour kicked-off, the band released a new single "Evergreen", from the Made of Rain sessions. According to Richard Butler it is about "memory and the passing of time."

Richard Butler co-wrote songs with Martin Gore for Depeche Mode's fifteenth studio album Memento Mori (2023), including the lead single "Ghosts Again".

Saxophonist Mars Williams died on 20 November 2023, with his final performance being October 14, 2023, at the Pearl Concert Theater, Las Vegas.

== Members ==
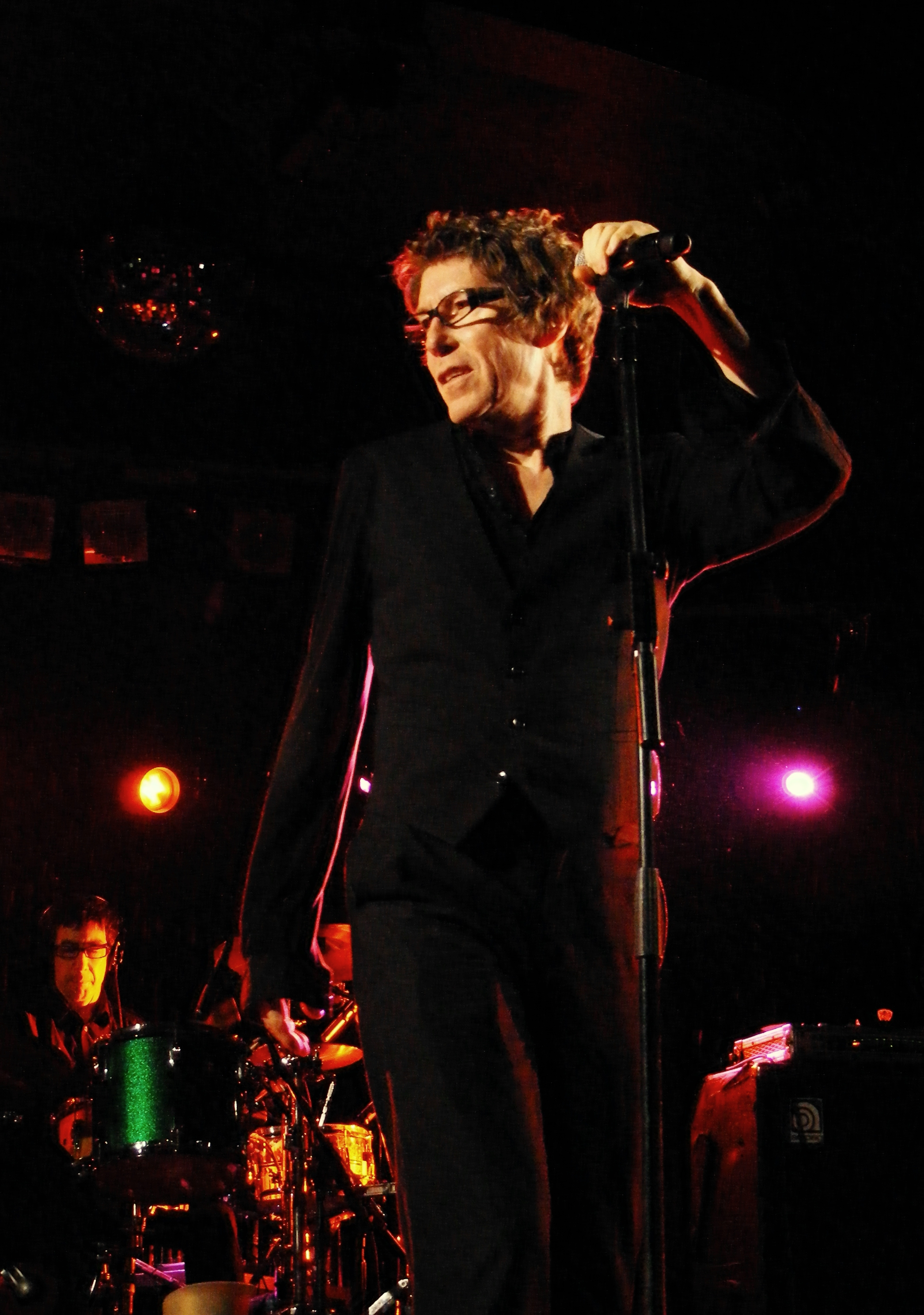
R. Butler

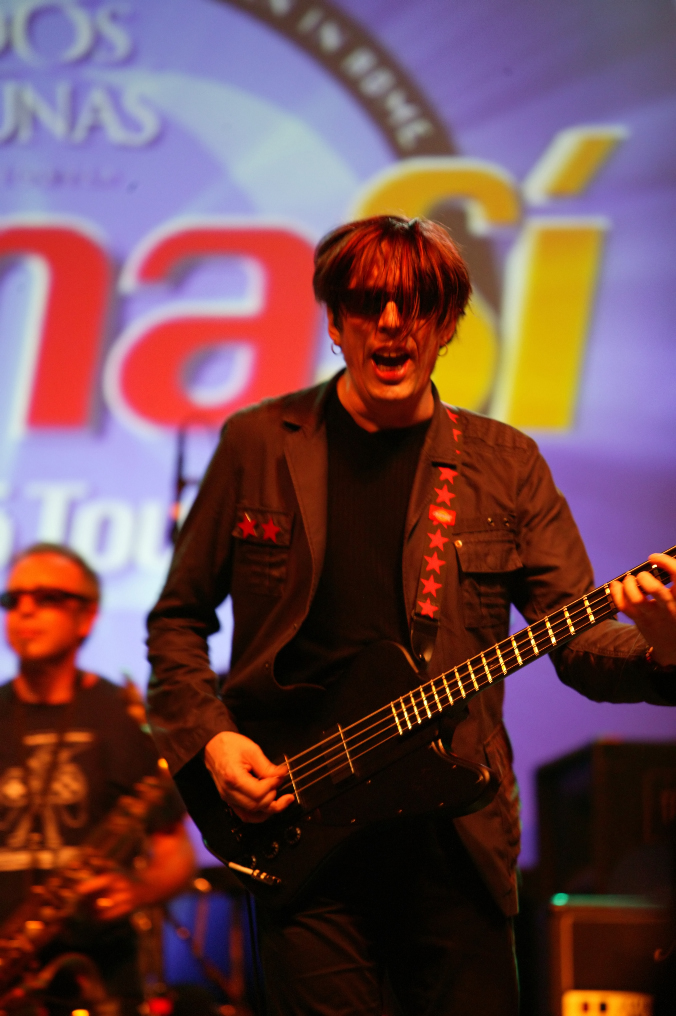
T. Butler

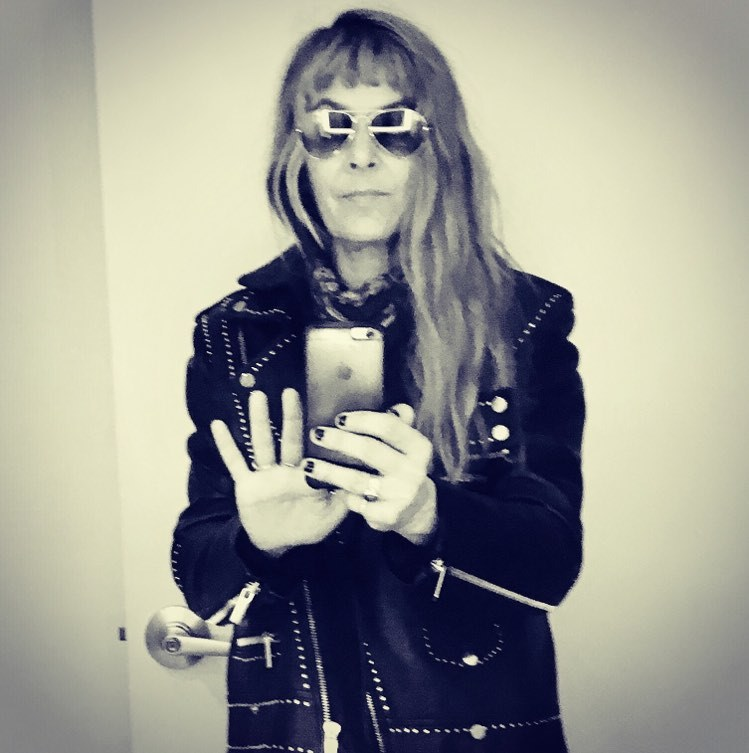
Kramer

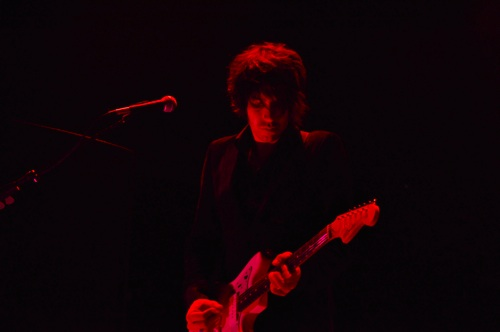
Good

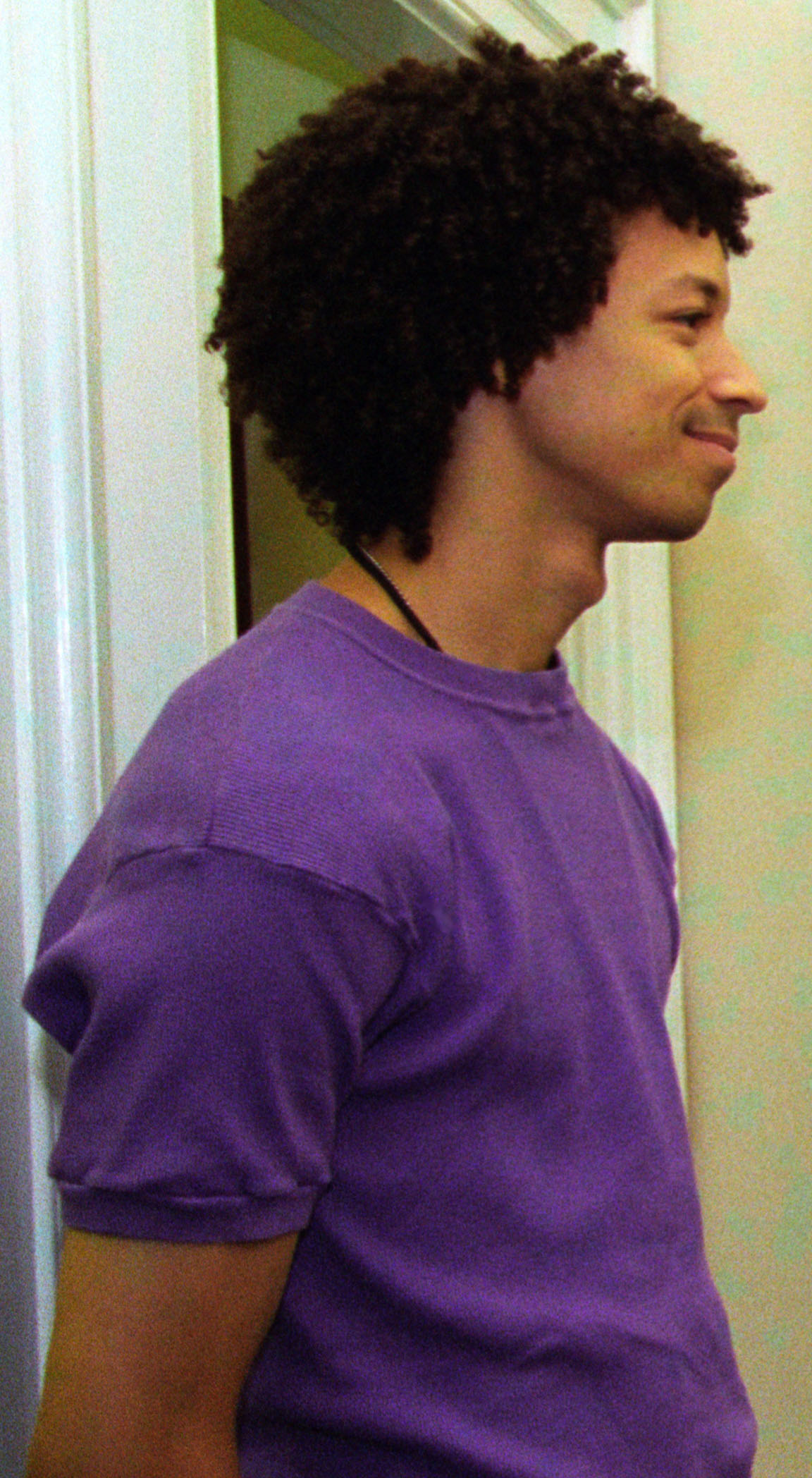
Alford

Current

- Richard Butler – vocals (1977–1992, 2000–present)
- Tim Butler – bass (1977–1992, 2000–present)
- Amanda Kramer – keyboards (2002–present)
- Rich Good – guitars (2009–present)
- Zack Alford – drums (2021–present)
- Peter DiStefano – guitars (2025–present)

Former members and touring musicians

- Duncan Kilburn – saxophone, keyboards (1977–1982)
- Roger Morris – guitars (1977–1982)
- Paul Wilson – drums (1977–1978)
- John Ashton – guitars (1979–1992, 2000–2008)
- Vince Ely – drums (1979–1982, 1988–1990)
- Phill Calvert– drums (1982–1983)
- Ann Sheldon – cello (1982–1983)
- Gary Windo – saxophone (1982–1983)
- Ed Buller - keyboards (1982–1985)
- Mars Williams – saxophone (1983–1989, 2005–2023)
- Mike Mooney – guitars (1984–1985)
- Paul Garisto – drums (1984–1988, 2009–2020)
- Marty Williamson – guitars (1986–1987)
- Roger O'Donnell – keyboards (1986–1987)
- Joe McGinty – keyboards (1989–1991)
- Knox Chandler – guitars, cello (1990–1991)
- Don Yallech – drums (1990–1992)
- Richard Fortus – guitars (2000–2002, 2024–2025)
- Earl Harvin – drums (2000–2001)
- Frank Ferrer – drums (2001–2008, 2026)

Timeline

== Discography ==
- The Psychedelic Furs (1980)
- Talk Talk Talk (1981)
- Forever Now (1982)
- Mirror Moves (1984)
- Midnight to Midnight (1987)
- Book of Days (1989)
- World Outside (1991)
- Made of Rain (2020)
