= Talk Talk Talk =

Studio album by The Psychedelic Furs
- Released: 15 May 1981
- Recorded: 1980–1981
- Genres: Post-punk; new wave
- Length: 41:11
- Label: CBS
- Producer: Steve Lillywhite

The Psychedelic Furs chronology
The Psychedelic Furs (1980)	Talk Talk Talk (1981)	Forever Now (1982)

Professional ratings
Review scores
Source	Rating
AllMusic	5/5 stars
Classic Rock	8/10
Entertainment Weekly	A−
Rolling Stone	4/5 stars
The Rolling Stone Album Guide	4.5/5 stars
Smash Hits	8/10
Spin Alternative Record Guide	9/10
The Village Voice	A

Talk Talk Talk is the second studio album by the English rock band The Psychedelic Furs. It was released on 15 May 1981 by Columbia Records. It was reissued with bonus tracks in 2002 by Columbia/Legacy and on vinyl in the UK in 2011 without bonus content.

== Content ==
AllMusic noted that with Talk Talk Talk, "the Furs introduce[d] a brighter, poppier side to their underground rock edge".

== Track listing ==
All songs were written by Richard Butler, John Ashton, Roger Morris, Tim Butler, Duncan Kilburn, and Vince Ely.

=== 1981 UK track listing ===
Side 1

1. "Dumb Waiters" – 5:09
2. "Pretty in Pink" – 3:59
3. "I Wanna Sleep with You" – 3:17
4. "No Tears" – 3:14
5. "Mr. Jones" – 4:03

Side 2

1. "Into You Like a Train" – 4:35
2. "It Goes On" – 3:52
3. "So Run Down" – 2:51
4. "All of This and Nothing" – 6:25
5. "She Is Mine" – 3:51

=== 1981 US track listing ===
Side 1

1. "Pretty in Pink" – 3:59
2. "Mr. Jones" – 4:03
3. "No Tears" – 3:14
4. "Dumb Waiters" – 5:09
5. "She Is Mine" – 3:51

Side 2

1. "Into You Like a Train" – 4:35
2. "It Goes On" – 3:52
3. "So Run Down" – 2:51
4. "I Wanna Sleep with You" – 3:17
5. "All of This and Nothing" – 6:25

=== 2002 reissue ===
1. "Dumb Waiters" – 5:04
2. "Pretty in Pink" – 3:59
3. "I Wanna Sleep with You" – 3:17
4. "No Tears" – 3:14
5. "Mr. Jones" – 4:03
6. "Into You Like a Train" – 4:35
7. "It Goes On" – 3:52
8. "So Run Down" – 2:51
9. "All of This and Nothing" – 6:25
10. "She Is Mine" – 3:51

Bonus tracks

11. "Mr. Jones (Single Version)" – 3:26
12. "So Run Down (Early Version)" – 3:05
13. "All of This and Nothing (Demo)" – 9:02

The demo of "All of This and Nothing" ends at 3:51 and is followed at 4:23 by "Buy Talk Talk Talk". Some copies of the UK 7" single of "Dumb Waiters" came in a "playable sleeve" – a stiff card picture bag with a clear flexi disc attached. This consisted of Richard Butler introducing extracts from "Into You Like a Train", "I Wanna Sleep With You" and "Pretty in Pink".

== Personnel ==
The Psychedelic Furs

- Richard Butler – vocals
- Roger Morris – lead guitar
- John Ashton – rhythm guitar
- Tim Butler – bass
- Duncan Kilburn – saxophone, keyboards
- Vince Ely – drums

Technical

- Steve Lillywhite – producer
- Phil Thornalley, Will Gosling – engineers
- Julian Balme, Richard Butler – design (after Andy Warhol)
- Andrew Douglas – photography

== Chart performance ==
Album

Year	Chart	Peak position
1981	Billboard 200	89

Singles

Year	Single	Chart	Peak position
1981	"Dumb Waiters" / "Into You Like a Train"	US National Disco Action Top 80	27
