= Richard Butler (singer) =

British singer

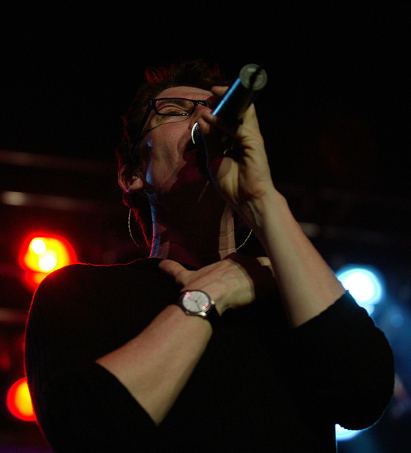
- Butler performing live in 2006

Background information
- Born: Richard Lofthouse Butler; 5 June 1956 (age 70); Kingston upon Thames, Surrey, England
- Genres: Alternative rock; post-punk; new wave; post-grunge
- Occupations: Singer; songwriter
- Years active: 1977–present
- Label: Koch
- Member of: The Psychedelic Furs
- Formerly of: Love Spit Love
- Spouse: Erika Anderson (m. 2020)

Richard Lofthouse Butler (born 5 June 1956) is an English singer and songwriter. Butler came to prominence in the early 1980s as lead vocalist of the rock band the Psychedelic Furs and went on to found the alternative rock band Love Spit Love in the early 1990s, during a hiatus of the Psychedelic Furs. Butler began his solo career in 2006, while still being a member of the Psychedelic Furs, releasing the self-titled studio album Richard Butler.

== Early years ==
Richard Lofthouse Butler was born on 5 June 1956 in Kingston upon Thames, southwest London. His father, George Butler, was a research chemist, communist and atheist. In the 1970s, George Butler was slated to become a scientific ambassador to the Soviet Union but a friend convinced him this would not be a good place for his family. Butler's mother was an artist. Butler started art school in London with the idea of becoming a painter. After graduation, he worked in a silk-screen print shop but got the idea to form a band.

== Musical career ==
Butler formed the Psychedelic Furs in 1977 with his bassist brother Tim Butler. According to Butler, the Psychedelic Furs began rehearsing in the Butlers' front room, but were soon banished because of the noise. Joined by guitarist John Ashton, guitarist Roger Morris, drummer Vince Ely and saxophonist Duncan Kilburn, the band quickly gained commercial success.

The Psychedelic Furs went on hiatus in the early 1990s and Butler became the founder and lead singer of Love Spit Love. By 2000 he stated that Love Spit Love had "gone into remission." His work with Love Spit Love can be heard on the hit syndicated television show Charmed. A truncated version of LSL's cover version of the Smiths' hit song "How Soon Is Now?" – recorded for The Craft soundtrack – plays during the Charmed opening credits. He also sang backing vocals, on "I Am Anastasia" by the American band Sponge. Love Spit Love's "Am I Wrong" was the theme over the opening credits of the 1995 film Angus.

In 2001, the Psychedelic Furs reformed after a nine-year hiatus and have toured worldwide since then.

In early 2006, Butler released the eponymous solo album titled Richard Butler, a collection of songs dedicated to his late father, George Butler, and also Jon Carin's father, Arthur A. Carin (Carin was Richard Butler's collaborator on the release, co-authoring and arranging much of the music). In 2014, Butler covered Charles Aznavour's "She" for the Gone Girl teaser trailer.

Butler co-wrote "Ghosts Again" with Martin Gore, the first single from the Depeche Mode album Memento Mori, released on February 9, 2023. He also co-wrote three other songs on that album.

== Personal life ==
Richard Butler has one daughter. In September 2020, the elder Butler married model and actress Erika Anderson known from A Nightmare on Elm Street 5: The Dream Child and Zandalee.

== Art ==
Richard Butler studied painting at the Epsom School of Art and Design (now University for the Creative Arts). Shortly after graduating from the art school, in 1977, Richard Butler became a founder and singer/songwriter for the British post-punk / new wave band "The Psychedelic Furs". Quickly gaining commercial success, his musical career kept him away from painting throughout the 80s and the 90s. In early 2000s, Richard Butler returned to painting and started exhibiting his art in the U.S. and Europe. He prefers to call himself a painter who sings, rather than a singer who paints. He lives and works in Connecticut. He has had solo exhibitions in New York City, Miami (Aliona Ortega Fine Art), and Florence, Italy. One of his works, Girl with a Map, has been used as a CD's cover art.

== Discography ==
Solo

- Richard Butler (2006)

The Psychedelic Furs

- The Psychedelic Furs (1980)
- Talk Talk Talk (1981)
- Forever Now (1982)
- Mirror Moves (1984)
- Midnight to Midnight (1987)
- Book of Days (1989)
- World Outside (1991)
- Made of Rain (2020)

Love Spit Love

- Love Spit Love (1994)
- Trysome Eatone (1997)
