= John Ashton (musician) =

English musician, songwriter, composer, and record producer (born 1957)

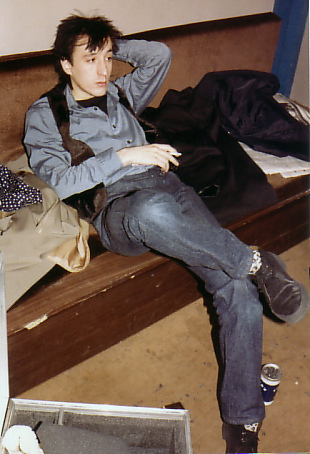

Background information
- Born: John Geza Ashton; 30 November 1957 (age 68); Forest Gate, London, England United Kingdom
- Genres: Post-punk; new wave; alternative rock
- Occupations: Musician; songwriter; composer; record producer
- Instrument: Guitar
- Years active: 1977–present
- Formerly of: The Psychedelic Furs

John Geza Ashton (born 30 November 1957) is an English musician, songwriter, composer, and record producer, with a career spanning more than 40 years. He is best known as the guitarist of the Psychedelic Furs.

== Early life ==
John Geza Ashton was born on 30 November 1957 in Whipps Cross Hospital, Forest Gate, London, and lived in North Kilworth in south Leicestershire.

== Career ==
Ashton came to prominence in the early 1980s as the guitarist of the Psychedelic Furs. The band is an English post-punk group formed in 1977 by Richard and Tim Butler, Duncan Kilburn and Roger Morris. Their debut studio album was a hit in the UK and Europe, and they had added John Ashton on guitar and Vince Ely on drums. Their second studio album Talk Talk Talk (1981) placed them on the US charts. Before the release of Forever Now in late 1982, Morris and Kilburn left the band, and Ashton and the Butler brothers went on to release Mirror Moves (1984) and other subsequent albums. The Psychedelic Furs went on hiatus after their 1992 tour, but reformed in 2001. Since then, Ashton has joined the band on occasion for tours.

After the Psychedelic Furs went on hiatus, Ashton became a record producer and worked on a number of projects including Marianne Faithfull, the Sisters of Mercy, Red Betty, and Seven Color Sky. Ashton mixed and co-produced the Secret Post's studio album From Train to Station, released in 2015, and oversaw recordings with Los Angeles' Silence.

Ashton has also pursued a solo career and released his debut studio album, Satellite Paradiso, in 2014.

== Personal life ==
Ashton moved to the United States around 1989. He is married to Catherine Dewson, a Virginia Beach native. The couple have two children, and currently resides in Woodstock, New York. In the summer of 2021, Ashton was diagnosed with prostate cancer; there was a GoFundMe page set up by friend and fellow musician, Gail Ann Dorsey, to help the family with the costs.
