= Tim Butler =

English songwriter and musician

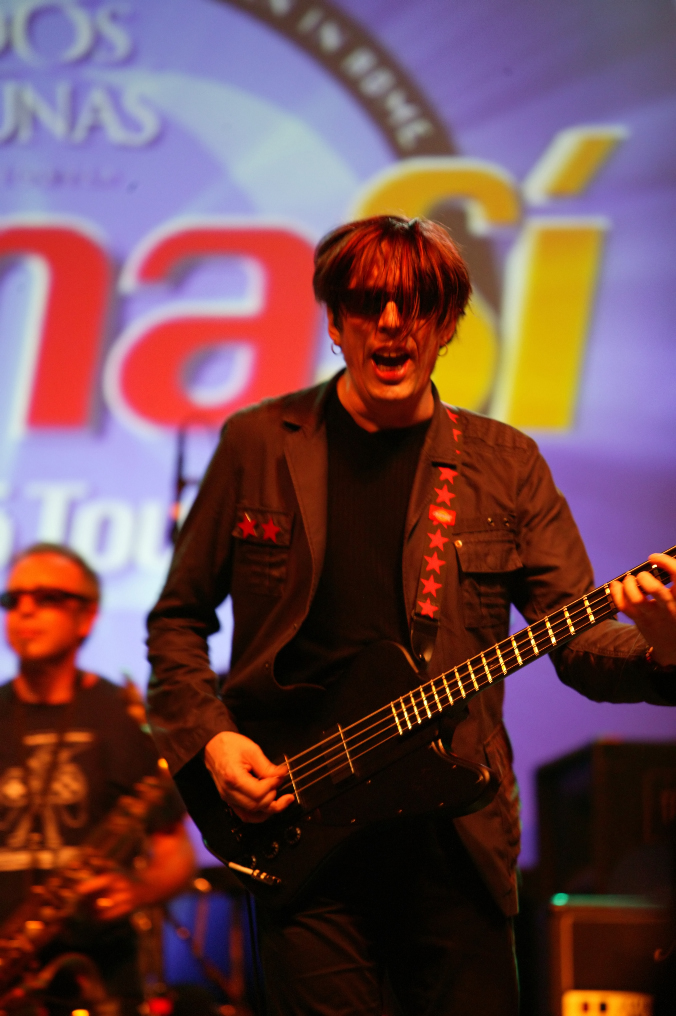
- Butler performing live with the Psychedelic Furs in 2006

Background information
- Born: Timothy George Butler; 7 December 1958 (age 67); Teddington, Middlesex, England
- Genres: Alternative rock; post-punk; new wave; post-grunge
- Occupations: Musician; songwriter
- Instrument: Bass guitar
- Years active: 1977–present
- Member of: The Psychedelic Furs
- Formerly of: Love Spit Love

Timothy George Butler (born 7 December 1958) is an English musician and songwriter. He is the bassist, and co-founder of the English rock band the Psychedelic Furs. He is also the youngest of three brothers.

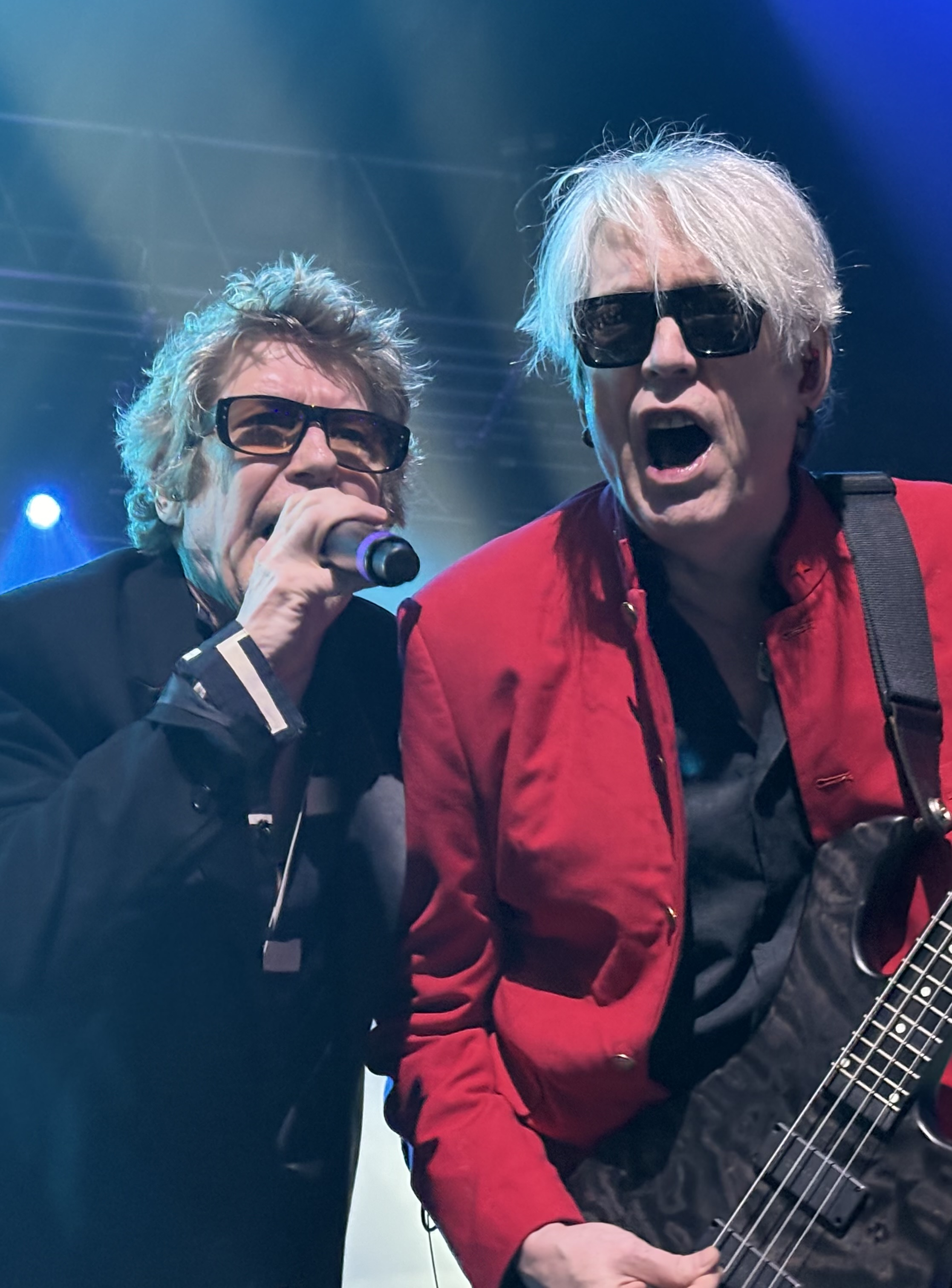
Brothers Tim Butler (R) and Richard Butler (L) perform with the Psychedelic Furs in 2024

Richard, the eldest, is the lead vocalist of the Psychedelic Furs. Both brothers were also founding members of the alternative rock band, Love Spit Love.

Butler was born in Teddington, Middlesex, England and lives in Liberty, Kentucky with his wife Robyn Wesley Butler and their children. She was a fan since the Psychedelic Furs' third studio album Forever Now (1982).
