= Guns N' Roses =

American rock band

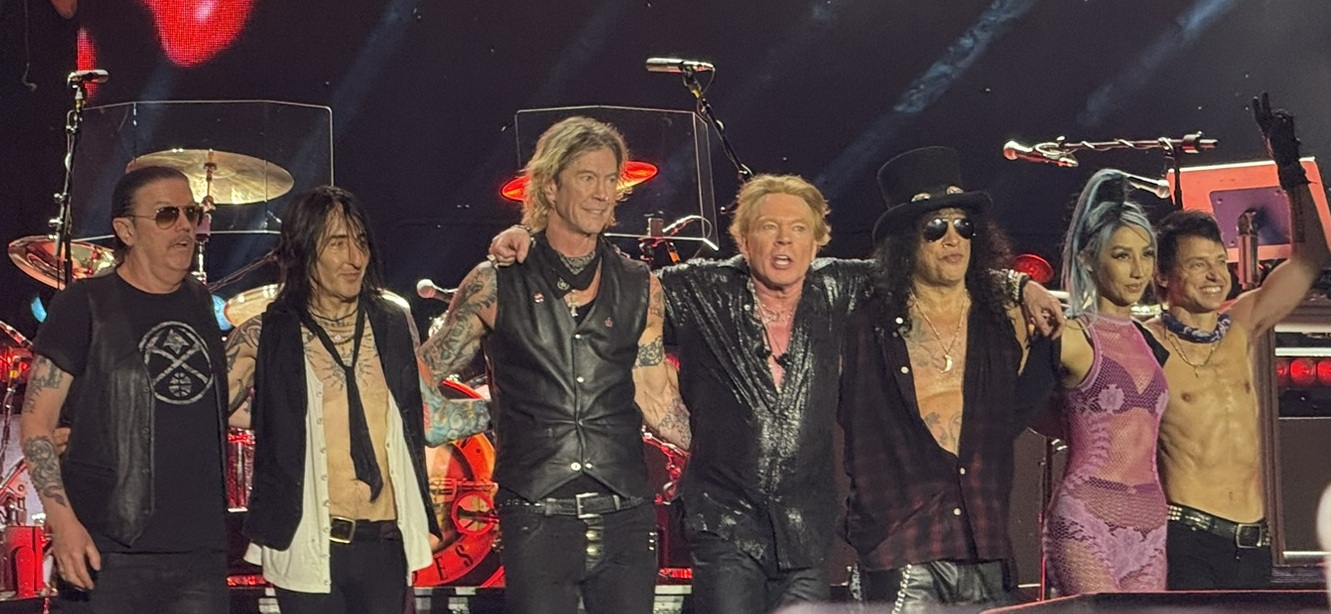
- Guns N' Roses at Usce Park, Belgrade in 2025. From left to right: Dizzy Reed, Richard Fortus, Duff McKagan, Axl Rose, Slash, Melissa Reese and Isaac Carpenter.

Background information
- Also known as: GNR
- Origin: Los Angeles, California, U.S.
- Genres: Hard rock; heavy metal
- Works: Discography; songs
- Years active: 1985–present
- Labels: Geffen; UMG; UZI Suicide; Black Frog
- Spinoffs: Slash's Snakepit; Velvet Revolver
- Spinoff of: L.A. Guns; Hollywood Rose
- Awards: Full list
- Members: Axl Rose; Duff McKagan; Slash; Dizzy Reed; Richard Fortus; Melissa Reese; Isaac Carpenter
- Past members: List of former members
- Website: gunsnroses.com

Guns N' Roses (Note: Also stylized as Guns 'N' Roses, and often abbreviated as GNR) is an American hard rock band formed in Los Angeles, California, in March 1985 by Axl Rose, Izzy Stradlin, Tracii Guns, and others from L.A. Guns and Hollywood Rose. The classic lineup, Rose (vocals), Slash (lead guitar), Stradlin (rhythm guitar), Duff McKagan (bass), and Steven Adler (drums), was finalized in June 1985. After signing with Geffen Records in 1986, the band released its debut album Appetite for Destruction (1987). Initially slow to sell, it broke through with the "Welcome to the Jungle" music video and went on to sell more than 30 million copies worldwide, becoming the best-selling debut album in the U.S. It produced three Billboard Hot 100 top-ten singles: "Welcome to the Jungle", "Paradise City", and the band's only number-one, "Sweet Child o' Mine". The follow-up, G N' R Lies (1988), reached number two and featured the top-five single "Patience".

Adler was fired in 1990 and replaced by Matt Sorum. The twin albums Use Your Illusion I and II (1991) debuted at numbers two and one on the Billboard 200 and sold a combined 35 million copies worldwide. The Illusion albums featured high-budget music videos, including "November Rain", which reached number three on the Billboard Hot 100 and later became the first 1990s music video to reach one billion YouTube views. The subsequent Use Your Illusion Tour (1991–93) was marked by the Riverport Riot and other incidents; Stradlin left mid-tour and was replaced by Gilby Clarke, who appeared on the punk covers album "The Spaghetti Incident?" (1993). Clarke was later replaced by Paul Tobias, whose presence contributed to friction that led Slash, Sorum and McKagan to leave between 1996 and 1997. By 1998, only Rose and keyboardist Dizzy Reed remained from the Illusion era.

Rose rebuilt the band with a rotating cast that included Brain, Buckethead, Frank Ferrer, Robin Finck, Richard Fortus, Josh Freese, Chris Pitman, Reed, Tommy Stinson, Ron "Bumblefoot" Thal, and Tobias. The long-delayed Chinese Democracy (2008), reportedly the most expensive album ever made at $13 million, debuted at number three but undersold expectations and was banned in China. The Chinese Democracy Tour (2001-2011) included cancelled dates and riots. After years of public feuding, Slash and McKagan rejoined the band in 2016 for the Not in This Lifetime... Tour, which grossed $563.3 million and ranked as the second-highest-grossing concert tour at the time. Since the reunion, the band has released deluxe editions of Appetite for Destruction (2018) and Use Your Illusion (2022), a remastered Live Era '87–'93 (2025), and new singles "Absurd", "Hard Skool" (2021), "Perhaps" (2023), "Nothin'" and "Atlas" (2025). The current lineup is Rose, Slash, McKagan, rhythm guitarist Fortus, drummer Isaac Carpenter, and keyboardists Reed and Melissa Reese.

Guns N' Roses has sold more than 100 million records worldwide. Greatest Hits (2004) is one of the longest-charting albums in the history of the Billboard 200. Their early sound fused punk, blues, hard rock, and metal; the Illusion albums added progressive and art rock elements, and Chinese Democracy incorporated industrial and electronic textures. Appetite for Destruction is credited with helping end the late-1980s glam metal craze and was inducted into the Grammy Hall of Fame in 2024. The band was inducted into the Rock and Roll Hall of Fame in 2012, though Rose declined to attend. Incidents including Rose's 1987 arrest in Atlanta, the deaths of two fans at the 1988 Monsters of Rock festival, and multiple riots earned the band the label "the most dangerous band in the world". Controversies arose over lyrics (notably "One in a Million"), a hidden Charles Manson cover on "The Spaghetti Incident?", chronic late concert starts and long gaps between albums.

== History ==
=== Formation (1985–1986) ===
The original lineup of Guns N' Roses in March 1985. From left to right: Rob Gardner, Izzy Stradlin, Axl Rose, Tracii Guns and Ole Beich.

In 1983, guitarist Tracii Guns introduced Chris Weber to Izzy Stradlin, who soon formed a band with Stradlin's childhood friend, Axl Rose. After several lineup changes, the group became Hollywood Rose. Guitarist Slash replaced Weber in mid-1984, and the group dissolved that August. Rose later joined Guns's band L.A. Guns on Stradlin's recommendation. Rose made his debut with L.A. Guns at the Troubadour on October 5, 1984, on a bill with London, Stradlin's band at the time, and left within weeks. On New Year's Eve 1984, Rose and Stradlin briefly reunited as Hollywood Rose for a one-off show, which included the first live performance of "Don't Cry".

Rose, Stradlin, Guns, Gardner, and bassist Ole Beich formed Guns N' Roses in March 1985. Guns recalled the formation of the band in a 2019 interview, stating: "Axl got into an argument with our manager and our manager fired Axl... So, that same night we started Guns N' Roses... I called Izzy the next day and said, 'Hey, we are gonna start this new band called Guns N' Roses, do you want in?'". The name, which combined those of their previous bands, was devised in late 1984 and was initially intended for a record label. Rejected names included "Heads of Amazon" and "AIDS".

After two rehearsals, Beich, who had stopped responding to the band, was replaced by Duff McKagan, a Seattle musician who lived across the street from Stradlin. Their first rehearsal with McKagan was recorded, and three songs—"Don't Cry", "Think About You" and "Anything Goes"—were aired during their first radio interview, two days before their debut show at the Troubadour on March 26, 1985. (Note: The show was billed as "L.A. Guns and Hollywood Rose presents Guns N Roses") Plans for an EP featuring those songs and a cover of "Heartbreak Hotel" were abandoned when Guns and Gardner both left in the spring of 1985. Slash, who had just joined the band Black Sheep, agreed to replace Guns after Rose and Stradlin approached him at a Black Sheep show on May 31, and Steven Adler took over on drums. (Note: Slash had also previously played with McKagan and Adler in Road Crew.)

We had a singer (Mike Jagosz) that our manager didn't like, so we fired him. So then I asked Axl to join L.A. Guns ... The same manager ended up hating Axl and he wanted to fire him. We're all living together at this point and Axl and I sat down and went 'What are we going to do?' So we both said 'Fuck that', and came up with the name Guns N' Roses, which was going to be just a record label that we'd put singles out on.

— Original guitarist Tracii Guns

The "classic" lineup, Rose, Stradlin, Slash, McKagan, and Adler, was finalized on June 4, 1985. After two rehearsals, they played their first show on June 6 at the Troubadour, on a bill with Mistreater and Fineline. Stradlin and McKagan soon cut down Adler's double-bass drum kit, leaving him with the stripped-down setup that became his trademark. The day after the first show, the band set out on a short West Coast tour booked by McKagan. When the car towing their equipment trailer broke down near Bakersfield, the band hitchhiked roughly a thousand miles north with only their guitars, and played the only date of the tour in Seattle on June 8 using instruments borrowed from the Fastbacks. The rest of the planned dates were cancelled. McKagan later called the "Hell Tour" a defining moment for the group.

Guns N' Roses gained traction on the Hollywood club circuit, performing at venues like The Troubadour and The Roxy, and by early 1986 were selling out shows at both. In March 1986, they signed with Geffen Records, turning down a more lucrative offer from Chrysalis, which had sought to alter their image. The signing followed a tip to Geffen A&R executive Tom Zutaut. Geffen offered full creative control and a $75,000 advance. After signing, their management rented them a house on the former estate of Cecil B. DeMille in Laughlin Park, which the band dubbed "The Hell House". (Note: The house became a hub for figures like West Arkeen, Del James, Todd Crew of Jetboy, Marc Canter (of Canter's Deli), and a rotating cast of Hollywood artists, photographers, and musicians.) After the band wrecked the house, their management fired them, and Zutaut persuaded his friend Alan Niven, who also managed Great White, to take over later in 1986.

Guns N' Roses classic lineup, from left to right, Izzy Stradlin, Steven Adler, Axl Rose, Duff McKagan, & Slash

In the summer of 1986, with no producer settled, Geffen and the band planned a limited "bootleg" release on their own Uzi Suicide label to keep them occupied while they wrote and rehearsed and to build an underground following. The result, the EP Live ?!*@ Like a Suicide, was released on December 12, 1986. The EP included covers of Rose Tattoo's "Nice Boys" and Aerosmith's "Mama Kin", along with two originals: "Reckless Life" and "Move to the City". Though marketed as live recordings, the tracks were studio recordings made with Spencer Proffer at Pasha Studios, with crowd noise from recordings by Quiet Riot and Dio added afterward.

=== Breakthrough and mass popularity (1987–1989) ===
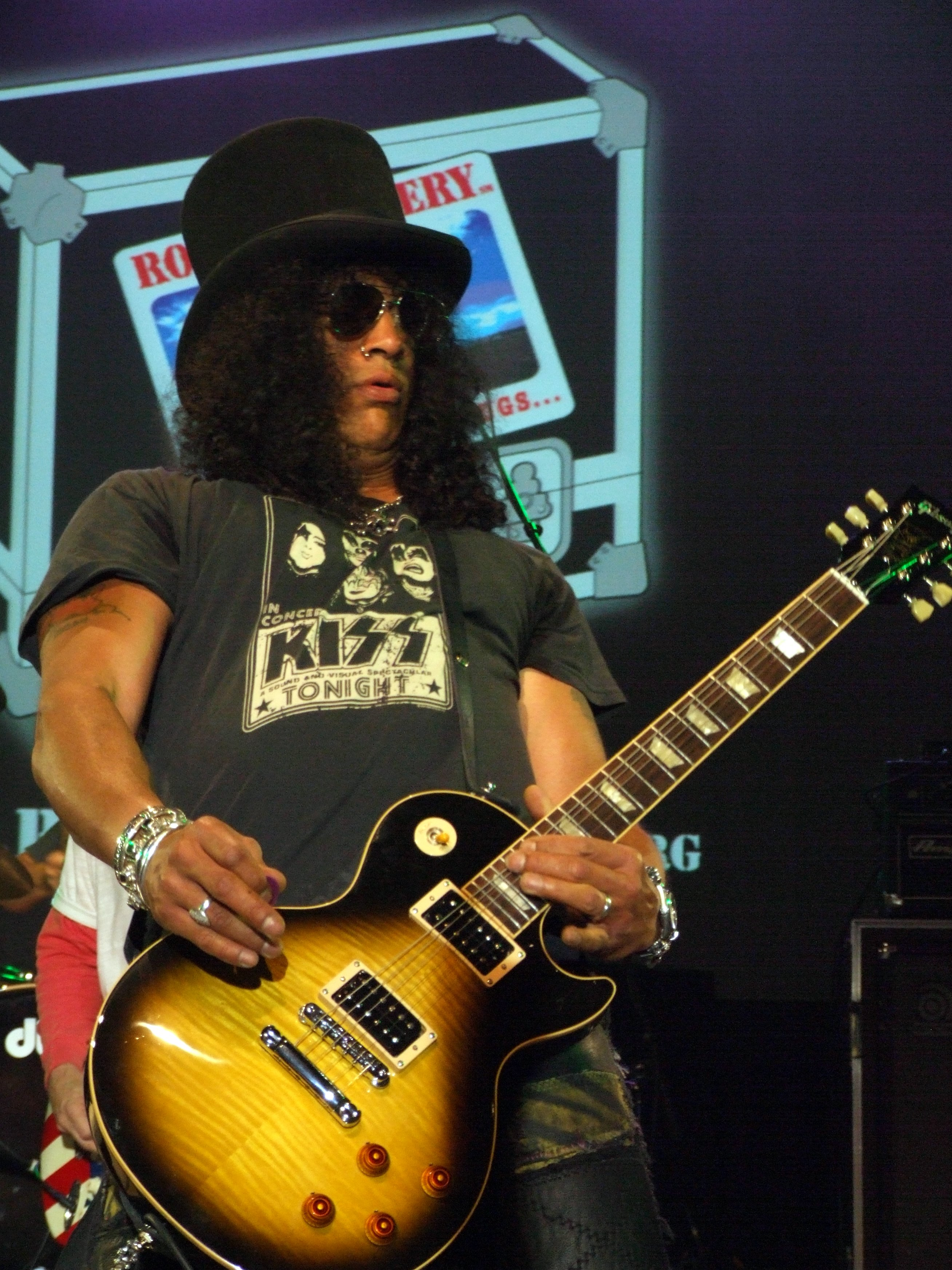
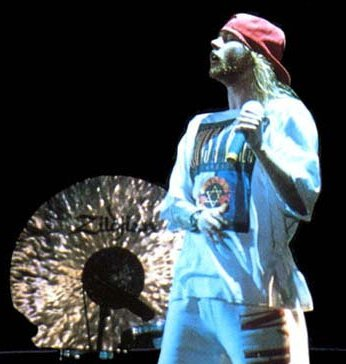
Guitarist Slash (left) and lead singer Axl Rose (right) were the band's most public faces during its late 1980s-early 1990s heyday.

==== Appetite for Destruction ====
Finding a producer for their debut album was difficult. Geffen declined to send the band to London to work with Bill Price, insisting the record be made in Los Angeles. Paul Stanley of Kiss was considered but rejected after proposing changes to Adler's drum setup. (Note: Stanley later claimed he lost interest in producing after Slash made derogatory comments about him. Slash responded, "We never were interested in working with him. But we sort of had him around because he was Adler's hero.") Mutt Lange and Tom Werman were also approached, but Geffen declined due to cost. In June 1986, Zutaut brought in Nazareth guitarist Manny Charlton to produce with the band for a few days. (Note: The demos recorded with Charlton were released in 2018 as part of the Appetite for Destruction Super Deluxe edition.) Later that year, Spencer Proffer was brought in and recorded several songs as a test. Ultimately, Mike Clink was selected, having previously worked with Triumph. Zutaut had suggested Clink, whose work on UFO's live album Strangers in the Night the band admired. On November 23, 1986, the band recorded "Shadow of Your Love" with Clink at Rumbo Recorders as a test.

After rehearsals, they entered Rumbo, in Canoga Park, in January 1987. The band recorded the basic tracks largely live, with the guitar amplifiers isolated from the drums and bass, in about two weeks, followed by a month of overdubs. Clink booked Take One Recording Studio in Burbank for guitar and vocal overdubs, and sessions continued until late March; Rose said the recording was finished on March 27, 1987. The schedule was erratic, with the band often unreliable about showing up, and Clink later said the hardest part was getting all five members focused at the same time. Drums were finished in six days, but Rose's vocals took significantly longer, as he insisted on recording one line at a time. The recording's cost has been reported as $140,000 by Clink and as about $365,000 by Niven. In the spring, Rose, Slash and Stradlin travelled to New York to oversee the mixing by Steve Thompson and Michael Barbiero, who had earlier been asked to produce the album but declined, and the album was mastered by George Marino.

Appetite for Destruction, Guns N' Roses' debut album, was released on July 21, 1987. The album's original cover art, painted by Robert Williams and depicting a surreal scene of a monster attacking a rapist robot, was deemed too controversial by retailers. Rose had found the 1978 painting, also titled Appetite for Destruction, on a postcard and proposed it as the cover, and the band took the album's title from it. After struggling to reach Williams, Rose and Niven drove to meet him to ask permission. Warner Bros. refused to print the original cover, so the band had to use an outside printer. A feminist group in California called the image a "glorification of rape". The band described the artwork as "a symbolic social statement, with the robot representing the industrial system that's raping and polluting our environment." A revised cover, created by Andy Engell from a design by tattoo artist Bill White Jr., featured skull caricatures of the five band members arranged on a cross, and the original painting was moved to the inner sleeve. The album also carried a parental advisory sticker because of its language, which the band dismissed as pointless.

The band's first single, "It's So Easy", was released exclusively in the UK on June 15, 1987, reaching number 84 on the UK Singles Chart. It was timed to coincide with the band's first performances outside the U.S., three shows at London's Marquee Club on June 19, 22 and 28, a trip manager Alan Niven financed with sales of Live ?!*@ Like a Suicide, which had built a cult following in Britain, partly through Kerrang!. In the United States, "Welcome to the Jungle" served as the lead single in October 1987, accompanied by a music video.

For nearly a year, the album and its singles struggled commercially. Appetite for Destruction debuted at number 182 on the Billboard 200 and sold only about 200,000 copies by the end of 1987. The band also struggled to secure tours: planned dates with Stryper and Y&T fell through, and a European tour with Aerosmith collapsed, with the band's reputation making promoters wary. That changed when Geffen Records founder David Geffen personally urged MTV to air the "Welcome to the Jungle" video during late-night rotation. Although initially played only once at 4 a.m. on a Sunday, viewer demand quickly surged. The song, written in Seattle but inspired by Rose's experiences in Los Angeles, was partly based on an encounter with a homeless man in New York who shouted, "You know where you are? You're in the jungle, baby; you're gonna die!". The track later appeared in the 1988 film The Dead Pool, in which the band made a cameo.

"Sweet Child o' Mine", the album's second U.S. single, originated as a poem Rose wrote for his then‑girlfriend Erin Everly. Its broad appeal and heavy rotation on radio and MTV propelled it to number one on the Billboard Hot 100 — the band's only chart‑topper. Slash later remarked, "I hated that song with a huge passion for the longest time, and it turned out to be our hugest hit." In Japan, the track appeared on the EP Live from the Jungle, which also included live recordings from the band's June 1987 Marquee Club shows.

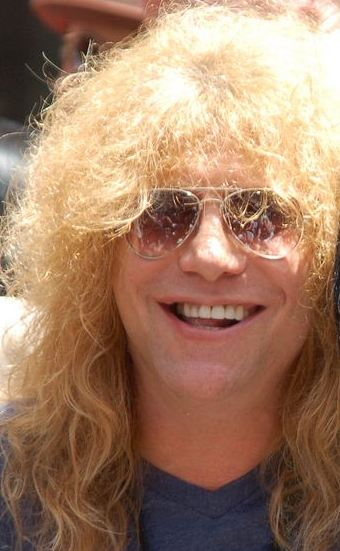
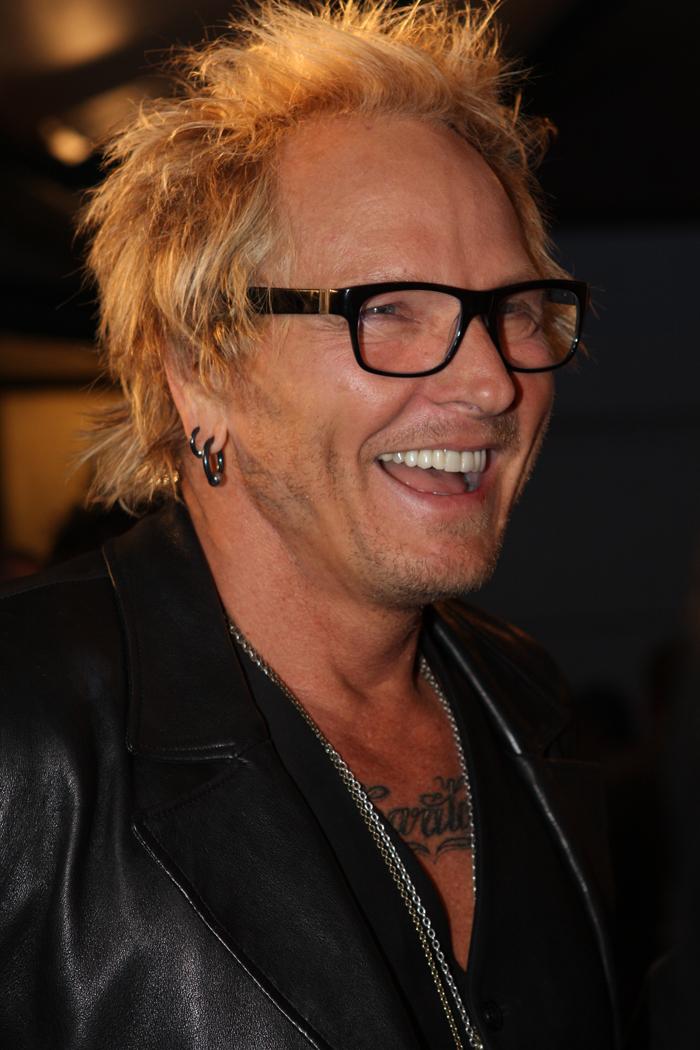
Steven Adler (left) was the band's drummer from 1985 to 1990, when he was replaced by Matt Sorum (right). The band fired Sorum in 1997.

Following the success of "Sweet Child o' Mine", "Welcome to the Jungle" was reissued and reached number 7 in the U.S. "Paradise City" peaked at number 5, and Appetite for Destruction eventually reached number 1 on the Billboard 200 on August 6, 1988, spending five nonconsecutive weeks at the top and 52 consecutive weeks in the top ten. Industry reaction was cool at first: Clink recalled people calling the finished record "the biggest piece of crap I've ever heard" before it sold, and Niven expected album-oriented radio to shun it. The album has since been ranked among the greatest of all time, with Rolling Stone placing it at number 62 on its list of the 500 greatest albums. It has sold more than 30 million copies worldwide, including 18 million in the United States, making it the best‑selling debut album in U.S. history and the eleventh best-selling album overall.

Guns N' Roses supported the album with the 16‑month Appetite for Destruction Tour. Alongside headlining dates in the U.S. and Europe, the band opened for the Cult, Mötley Crüe, and Alice Cooper in 1987. During the tour, Adler broke his hand in a fight and Cinderella's Fred Coury temporarily replaced him for eight shows. McKagan missed several dates in May 1988 for his wedding, with Kid "Haggis" Chaos of the Cult filling in. The band continued touring across the United States, Australia, and Japan, and opened North American shows for Iron Maiden and Aerosmith. Aerosmith manager Tim Collins later recalled, "By the end of the tour, Guns N' Roses were huge... Suddenly, the opening act was bigger than we were."

==== G N' R Lies ====
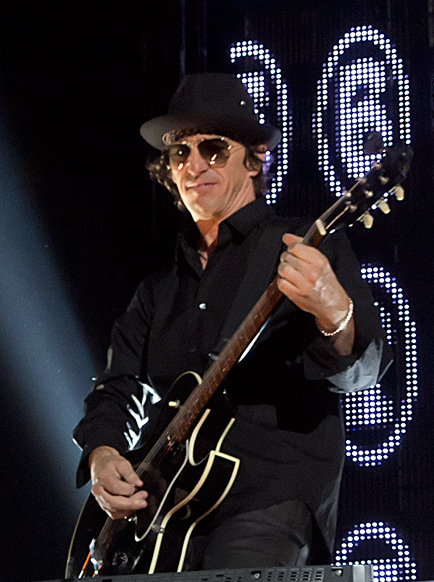
Izzy Stradlin was the band's rhythm guitarist from 1985 until 1991.

By the summer of 1988, Appetite for Destruction had reached number one on the Billboard 200 (on August 6), more than a year after its release. Guns N' Roses released their second album, G N' R Lies, on November 29, 1988. The album combined the four tracks from the band's 1986 EP Live ?!@ Like a Suicide* with four new acoustic songs. Band members described it as a stopgap rather than a follow-up to Appetite, recorded quickly, and said another motive was the price of the original EP, copies of which were selling for as much as $100 in Los Angeles. The album was subtitled "The Sex, the Drugs, the Violence, the Shocking Truth".

The cover artwork was designed as a tabloid-style parody, which the band presented as a response to years of exaggerated stories about them, including false reports that members had died, were drug addicts or had AIDS. Anticipating a hostile reaction to the lyrics, Rose included a written explanation and apology on the cover, and Geffen Records affixed warning stickers; label president Eddie Rosenblatt said the company supported free speech but could not speak for the artist. The artwork was altered after initial pressings to remove the headlines "Wife-beating has been around for 10,000 years" and "Ladies, welcome to the Dark Ages."

The album's sole single, "Patience", reached number four on the U.S. charts, while the album peaked at number two. It entered the top five in January 1989, putting Lies and Appetite in the top five at the same time. The release did not count toward the band's contractual album obligations to Geffen, and the label sent out no promotional copies. Stradlin later dismissed the album in a 1989 interview.

===== "One in a Million" =====
Rose said he wrote "One in a Million" half as a joke, after songwriter West Arkeen was robbed at knifepoint on Hollywood Boulevard, and drew on his own first experiences of Los Angeles, including the downtown Greyhound bus station. The song, which included the slurs "nigger" and "faggot", generated controversy and was widely criticized as racist, xenophobic, and homophobic. Doug Goldstein, the band's tour manager at the time and later its manager, said the lyrics were meant as satire reflecting the fears of an inexperienced teenager encountering diversity in Los Angeles, and that Rose defended the song as artistic expression, declining to further explain it.

Rose denied being racist and defended his language, arguing that certain terms were not intended to refer to race and citing other musicians' use of similar wording. He later acknowledged that the lyrics reflected his anger following an attempted robbery and conceded that the language was offensive. Slash, who is biracial, wrote in August 1989 that the band was not racist, that the word had been used to describe "street criminals" rather than a particular race, and that he himself found the word offensive. He described the song by saying, "This song is very simple and extremely generic. My apologies to those who may take offense." Addressing accusations of homophobia, Rose described himself as "pro-heterosexual" and attributed his views to negative personal experiences with gay men. In 1992 he said that in using the word he had "made a judgment call, and it was an insult". Geffen founder David Geffen, who is gay, said he had warned Rose that the song would cause trouble, that the negative reaction was "certainly deserved", but that he did not believe Rose was homophobic.

Other members of the band expressed reservations about including the song before the album's release. However, it ultimately remained at Rose's insistence. Slash said he had not wanted Rose to sing the "police and niggers" line, and Stradlin said he had questioned Rose about the lyrics and considered the song racist. Duff McKagan, who defended the song as a commentary on a naive young man's arrival in Los Angeles, wrote in his memoir that he stood by his interpretation but was uncomfortable with how it was received, noting that the press called the band "David Duke's house band" and that he had heard the Ku Klux Klan was using the song as a "war cry". At concerts in January 1992, Rose addressed the accusation directly, asking audiences whether they believed the band was racist and rejecting Duke. McKagan also said the band was removed from the lineup of an AIDS benefit after the song's release. Rolling Stone reported in 2000 that Rose planned to remove the song from future pressings of the album. (Note: Although remaining on future pressings of the album itself, the song was not reissued on the Appetite deluxe set in 2018, which contained every other song from Lies, with Slash stating it was a collective decision by the band.) McKagan said in 2019 that the band had since taken the song out because it had been so widely misinterpreted.

==== Concert incidents, Donington and Australia ====
During a November 1987 concert in Atlanta, Rose assaulted several security guards and was detained backstage by police, while the band completed the performance with a roadie on vocals. (Note: Rose was held backstage and allowed to leave if he apologized to the guards; but refused and was arrested.) Crowd disorder also marked several dates of the band's summer 1988 tour opening for Aerosmith. Stradlin described a show at Saratoga Springs, New York, on August 6 as "nearly a riot", with fans surging toward a stage guarded by few security staff; a local newspaper reported a melee in front of the stage during the final song. Rose was detained by police in Philadelphia on August 4 after a fight with a parking-lot attendant, and was released shortly before showtime, and that the band cut a show in Clarkston, Michigan, short by five minutes on August 13, afterward firing their sound mixer and bus driver.

The most serious incident came on August 20, 1988, when the band, placed low on the bill, played the Monsters of Rock festival at Donington Park in England before an audience of about 107,000. The infield was thick with mud, and as fans surged toward the stage, the show was stopped several times; McKagan recalled one pause of about twenty minutes while security pulled people from the crowd. Two fans, Alan Dick and Landon Siggers, were crushed to death during the band's set. Band members said they did not know anyone had died until after they left the stage, when their manager, Alan Niven, told them; accounts differ on whether the band had tried to halt the performance, with Stradlin saying he tried to stop the band and McKagan and Slash saying the band stopped playing. British Sunday tabloids falsely reported that the stage had collapsed and that the band had refused to stop playing, while police said there had been no arrests and described the crowd as "otherwise superb". Slash said he did not feel personally responsible, blaming the lack of security at the festival, while McKagan said he could not claim with conviction that the band bore no blame and that the deaths would haunt him.

In December 1988, shortly after the release of Lies, the band played its first shows in Japan, Australia and New Zealand. During the Australian leg, New South Wales Police Minister Ted Pickering was reported to be considering charges against Rose over his onstage references to drug use and for leading vulgar chants, and acting Premier Wal Murray was reportedly horrified. Other accounts claimed that a warrant had been issued and that the band left for New Zealand to avoid it. McKagan said that the band's management received a letter from an official saying the band was not welcome in Sydney.

Incidents such as these contributed to Guns N' Roses being labeled "the most dangerous band in the world", a phrase later used as the title of Mick Wall's 1991 biography of the band.

=== International success and band turmoil (1989–1993) ===
==== Use Your Illusion I and II ====
The band planned to start recording their follow-up to Appetite for Destruction in January 1989, but by February they still had not entered the studio. Slash said they had ten songs written by March, and Rose had considered a double album. However, the band did not have a set schedule for recording, and being off the road led to addiction issues with several members; Slash and Adler struggled with heroin while Stradlin battled a cocaine addiction. Adler's condition had already affected the band's live commitments: in January 1989 he entered rehab shortly before the American Music Awards, where Don Henley of the Eagles, a Geffen labelmate, filled in on drums for "Patience" at Rose's request. In the summer of 1989, the band relocated to Chicago for rehearsals, setting up in a vacant theater above the Metro. However, Rose and Stradlin did not arrive until two months into the stay. Slash said that "nothing was really getting done", though Rose and Stradlin disagreed with his assessment. Slash left town and considered leaving the band after Rose, according to Slash, destroyed the rehearsal space. By mid-1989, members of the band continued to struggle with addictions, including McKagan, who was drinking heavily, while Stradlin became sober in August after an incident in which he was arrested for disorderly conduct on an airplane. The band returned to Los Angeles for rehearsals in July, starting pre-production work with producer Mike Clink. Stradlin did not attend these rehearsals, but sent homemade cassette tapes of his songs and ideas to the band.

The band returned to the road in September 1989, opening several shows on the Rolling Stones' Steel Wheels Tour. In October 1989, while opening for them at the Los Angeles Memorial Coliseum, Rose warned that the shows would be the band's last if members did not stop using drugs, referencing the song "Mr. Brownstone". At the next show, Slash made a short speech about the perils of drugs, and Rose apologized to his bandmates onstage, saying "I'd like to apologize ... I just didn't want to see my friends slip away." After Slash was nearly arrested in Phoenix in October 1989 while experiencing drug-induced psychosis, the band staged an intervention and forced him into rehab, but he checked himself out after a few days. In November 1989, former Hollywood Rose guitarist Chris Weber sued the band for $300,000 in unpaid royalties, alleging that he was not credited as a co-writer on several Guns N' Roses songs. In late 1989, Slash became sober and later said:

There was that whole change in our personal lives ... it was really serious ... After the tour they basically dropped us off at the airport and it was like, "Well, touring's done, guys. Go make another record." We went through a lot of emotional and personal changes. We were gone for a long time, and during that period we watched everything go back down the toilet.

By December 1989, the band restarted pre-production work, considering several names for the album, including "Girth", "Heinous", "GN'R Sucks" and "BUY-product". In January 1990, Slash and McKagan accepted two American Music Awards on the band's behalf, for Favorite Heavy Metal/Hard Rock Artist and Favorite Heavy Metal/Hard Rock Album (Appetite for Destruction); Slash's profanity during the live telecast led ABC to apologize. In an interview after the ceremony, Slash said they had written 35 songs and were going to release 24 of them on a double album. Rose said the writing process had changed: "The first album was basically written off me coming up with maybe one line and maybe a melody for that line ... And then we'd build a song around it ... On this, Izzy's brought in eight songs ... Slash has brought in an album, I've brought in an album." Geffen Records was sold to MCA in March 1990. In a 1991 interview, Rose said the label had suggested release dates but that "we were not going to give anybody the record until we felt it was done."

By early 1990, Adler's drug use was holding up work on the new albums. In March 1990, Martin Chambers of the Pretenders and Adam Maples of Sea Hags were considered as replacements, and Jussi Tegelman, of the Finnish band Havana Black, also rehearsed with the band. McKagan later said the tryouts were meant partly to scare Adler into cleaning up. Adler was briefly fired due to his drug use but was reinstated after agreeing to a contract in which he pledged to stay clean. Dated March 28, 1990, the agreement reduced him from partner to employee for a 30-day period. The band also hired a sober coach, but according to McKagan nothing changed.

The band played only one show in 1990, the Farm Aid IV benefit at the Hoosier Dome in Indianapolis on April 7, where it debuted "Civil War" and a cover of the UK Subs' "Down on the Farm". Adler stumbled while taking the stage, and McKagan later said he was a mess onstage. Afterward, the band recorded "Civil War" for a charity compilation, Nobody's Child, in a rushed session outside its usual studio, according to Slash. During the recording session of "Civil War", Adler was unable to perform well due to his struggles with cocaine and heroin addiction, and caused the band to do nearly 30 takes. Adler claimed at the time he was sick from taking opiate blockers to help with the addictions. Slash said the drum track had to be edited heavily so the guitars could keep time, and that it was the only song on the albums on which Adler played. Keyboardist Dizzy Reed, then using the stage name Dizzy Zin, was invited to add piano to the song, and he soon joined as a full-time member, becoming the sixth member of the group. (Note: Reed, who had befriended the band in their early days, was previously bandmates with Matt Sorum in Johnny Crash.)

Slash later said that Adler would nod out at the drums during sessions at Rumbo Recorders, while Adler maintained that his playing on the demo tapes was good. Adler was fired on July 11, 1990, and later filed a lawsuit against the band. (Note: In mid-1993, the suit was settled out of court; Adler received a back-payment check of $2,250,000 and 15% royalties for songs he recorded.) In 2005, Adler recalled:

Doug Goldstein called me into the office about two weeks later. He wanted me to sign some contracts. I was told that every time I did heroin, the band would fine me $2,000. There was a whole stack of papers, with colored paper clips everywhere for my signatures. What these contracts actually said was that the band were paying me $2,000 to leave. They were taking my royalties, all my writing credits. They didn't like me anymore and just wanted me gone. That's why I filed the lawsuit – to get all those things back.

Finding a replacement proved difficult; Slash said the band could not advertise for a drummer. The position was filled by drummer Matt Sorum, who had been the Cult's touring drummer since late 1988. Slash and McKagan had seen him play with the Cult, and according to Sorum, Slash got his number from Metallica's Lars Ulrich. Sorum began rehearsing with the band in May 1990, initially to record the albums while Adler was expected to return for the tour. About two weeks later, Slash asked him to join, and he negotiated full membership rather than joining as a hired musician. Accounts differ on when he formally joined, with dates ranging from May to August 1990. Slash credited Sorum with preventing the band from breaking up at the time.

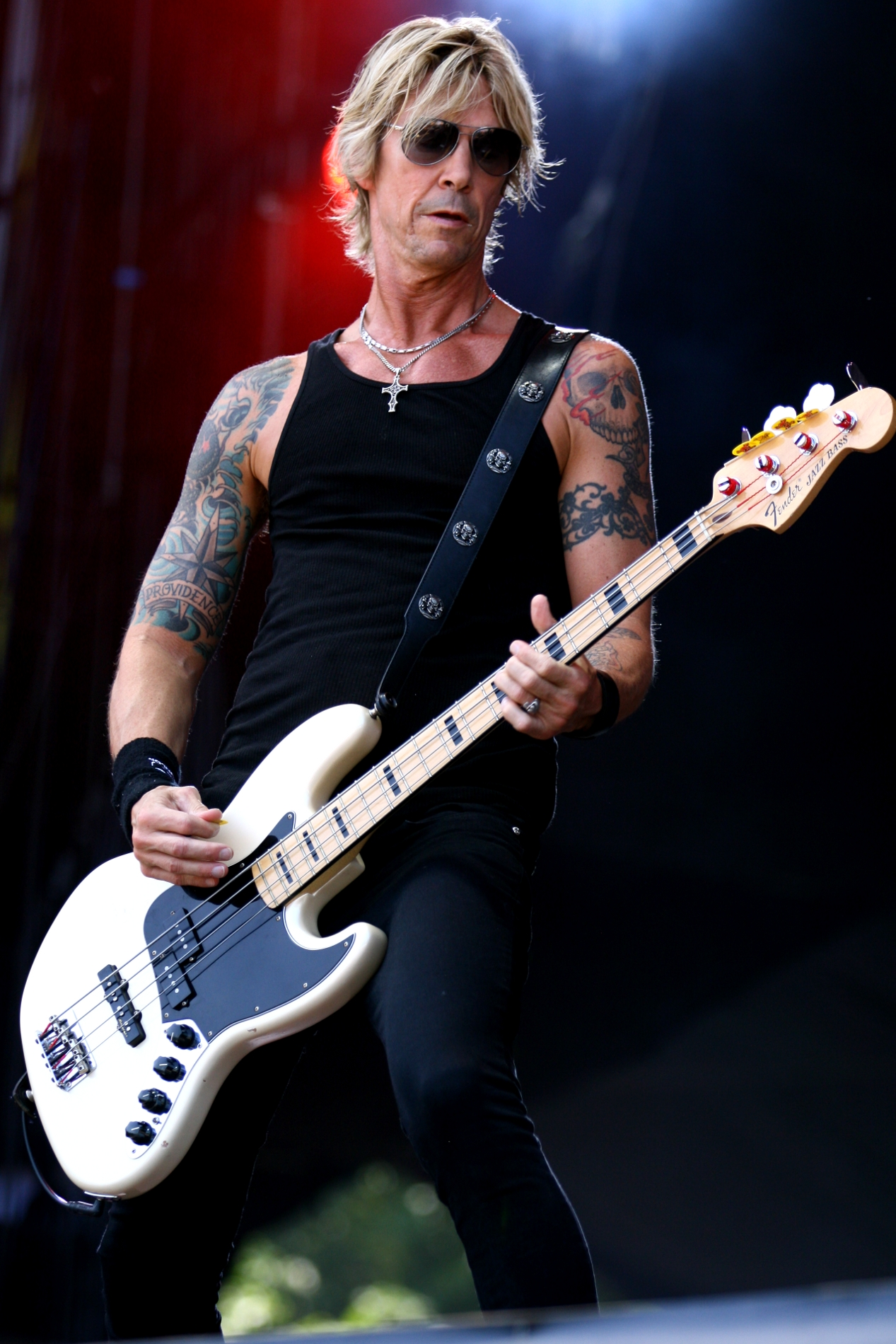
Duff McKagan was the band's bassist from 1985 until 1997, returning in 2016.

In response to an interviewer's suggestion that replacing Adler with Sorum had turned Guns N' Roses from a rock 'n' roll band to a heavy metal band, Stradlin responded: "Yeah, a big musical difference. The first time I realized what Steve did for the band was when he broke his hand in Michigan ... So we had Fred Coury come in from Cinderella for the Houston show. Fred played technically good and steady, but the songs sounded just awful. They were written with Steve playing the drums and his sense of swing was the push and pull that give the songs their feel. When that was gone, it was just ... unbelievable, weird. Nothing worked."

With Sorum in place, the band rehearsed more than 30 songs for about a month before entering the studio, and Slash said the basic tracks were recorded in roughly five weeks. In May 1991, Guns N' Roses fired their manager, Alan Niven, replacing him with Doug Goldstein. According to a 1991 cover story by Rolling Stone, Rose forced the dismissal of Niven against the wishes of some of his bandmates by refusing to complete the albums until he was replaced.

The band released the recordings as two albums, Use Your Illusion I and Use Your Illusion II, on September 17, 1991. They debuted at No. 2 and No. 1, respectively, on the Billboard 200, making Guns N' Roses the only act to achieve this feat until hip hop artist Nelly in 2004 and the first to have the top two albums since Jim Croce in 1974. The albums sold 770,000 units (Use Your Illusion II) and 685,000 units (Use Your Illusion I) in their first week, and spent 108 weeks on the chart. They have sold a combined 35 million copies worldwide, including 14 million in the United States.

Guns N' Roses accompanied the Use Your Illusion albums with many videos, including "Don't Cry", "November Rain" and "Estranged", some of the most expensive music videos ever made. The ballad "November Rain" reached No. 3 in the US and became the most requested video on MTV, eventually winning the 1992 MTV Video Music Award for best cinematography. At 8:57, it was at the time also the longest song in US chart history to reach the Top 10. (Note: Taylor Swift's All Too Well (10 Minute Version) broke the record in 2021.) During the awards show, the band performed the song with Elton John accompanying on piano.

==== Use Your Illusion Tour ====
Before releasing the albums, Guns N' Roses embarked on the 28-month Use Your Illusion Tour. It became famous for both its financial success and the many controversial incidents at its shows. The tour included 192 dates in 27 countries, with over seven million people attending concerts. It is often described as one of the longest tours in rock history. Shows featured a Slash guitar solo based on The Godfather theme, a piano-driven cover of Black Sabbath's "It's Alright", and an extended jam on "Move to the City" that showcased the expanded touring ensemble, which by 1992 included keyboardist Teddy Andreadis, backing vocalists Roberta Freeman and Tracey Amos, and a three-piece horn section (the 976-Horns).

===== 1991: Opening shows and Riverport riot =====
The band's first shows with Sorum and Reed were two headlining performances at Rock in Rio II at Maracanã Stadium in Rio de Janeiro on January 20 and 23, 1991, which drew a reported 280,000 people over the two nights. The sets leaned heavily on new material, with six songs (including "Estranged", "You Could Be Mine" and "Pretty Tied Up") making their live debuts. After three warm-up shows in May at the Warfield Theatre in San Francisco, the Pantages Theatre in Los Angeles and The Ritz in New York City, the first North American leg, billed as the "Get in the Ring, Motherfucker Tour", opened at Alpine Valley Music Theatre in East Troy, Wisconsin, on May 24 with Skid Row as the opening act. Rose had injured his heel at the Ritz show and wore a brace for the opening dates, which drew about 80,000 people over two nights and were marked by mud fights in the crowd.

At the Deer Creek Music Center in Noblesville, Indiana, on May 28, the band took the stage more than an hour after Skid Row finished and exceeded the venue's 11 p.m. curfew on both nights, resulting in a $5,000 fine; Rose also criticized the curfew and the state of Indiana, where he had grown up. Late starts became a recurring problem throughout the tour. Rose later said he followed his own internal clock and that emotional issues from therapy he began in February 1991 sometimes made it difficult to go onstage, while Slash described the band as a club act used to starting late.

On July 2, 1991, at the Riverport Amphitheater in Maryland Heights, Missouri, Rose spotted a fan filming the show, jumped into the audience after security failed to act, confronted and assaulted the fan, then left the stage after declaring, "Well, thanks to the lame-ass security, I'm going home!" The ensuing riot injured dozens; footage was captured by photographer Robert John, who was documenting the tour. The following shows in Chicago and Bonner Springs, Kansas, were cancelled. Rose was arrested nearly a year later, on July 12, 1992. Under a November 1992 plea agreement, he was convicted of property damage and assault, fined $50,000 and given two years' probation. (Note: As a result, the Use Your Illusion liner notes included the message "Fuck You, St. Louis!" among the thank-yous.) The band then played four sold-out shows at the Great Western Forum in Inglewood, California (July 29–30 and August 2–3); the final night ran 3 hours and 36 minutes, the longest of its career to that point.

===== Stradlin's departure and Clarke's arrival =====
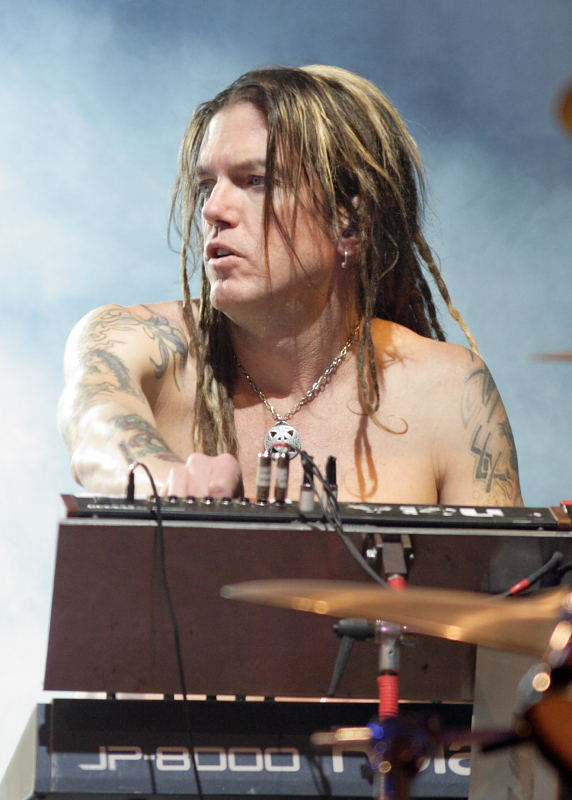
Dizzy Reed joined the band as keyboardist in 1990.

Stradlin did not take part in the mid-September 1991 video shoot for "Don't Cry", fueling rumors he would leave. Rhythm guitarist Izzy Stradlin abruptly quit on November 7, 1991, after a near-repeat of the St. Louis incident during a show in Germany. He cited Rose's behavior and mismanagement of the band, as well as the difficulty of remaining around Slash, Sorum and McKagan after he had become sober while they continued to use. He later said Rose had delayed every 1991 show by at least two hours and remarked, "Once I quit drugs, I couldn't help looking around and asking myself, 'Is this all there is?' I was just tired of it; I needed to get out." Stradlin later claimed the band offered him a new contract, demoting him to a lower position and cutting his royalties, which contributed to his leaving.

The band had roughly three weeks to find a replacement or cancel dates; Slash compiled a list of about 30 candidates. Rose favored Dave Navarro of Jane's Addiction, but Navarro never attended an audition. Los Angeles guitarist Gilby Clarke (formerly of Kill for Thrills) was the only player to audition in person; he learned approximately 50 songs in two weeks and made his debut at the Worcester Centrum on December 5, 1991, followed by dates at Madison Square Garden, with Soundgarden among the support acts. Slash later credited Clarke with saving the band. When the band returned to the United States, Rose wanted Nirvana as support, but Kurt Cobain declined. In 1993 Clarke broke his arm in a motorcycle accident and was replaced for several weeks by Stradlin.

===== 1992–93: Worldwide legs and Skin N' Bones =====
On April 20, 1992, the band performed at the Freddie Mercury Tribute Concert. Activist group ACT UP objected because of the lyrics to "One in a Million" and urged the crowd to boo; Queen guitarist Brian May defended their inclusion. Slash later joined the remaining members of Queen and Def Leppard's Joe Elliott for "Tie Your Mother Down", while Rose performed "We Will Rock You" and sang a duet with Elton John on "Bohemian Rhapsody".

A European leg opened on May 16, 1992, at Slane Castle in Ireland with Faith No More as support; the band took the stage roughly two hours late. On May 24 Rose joined U2 onstage in Vienna for "Knockin' on Heaven's Door". On June 6, 1992, the band played its first pay-per-view concert at the Hippodrome de Vincennes in Paris, with guest appearances by Jeff Beck, Lenny Kravitz, and Aerosmith's Steven Tyler and Joe Perry.

Later that year, Guns N' Roses co-headlined the Guns N' Roses/Metallica Stadium Tour with Metallica, supported by Faith No More, Motörhead and Body Count. On August 8 at Montreal's Olympic Stadium, Metallica's set was cut short after James Hetfield suffered second-degree burns from a pyrotechnics malfunction. Guns N' Roses took the stage after a long delay but left early because of monitor problems and Rose's throat issues, triggering another riot in which 10 audience members and three police officers were injured. (Note: The incident appears in A Year and a Half in the Life of Metallica; in one segment Hetfield mocked Rose and read items from his tour rider.)

External image
- Guns N' Roses receiving an MTV Video Music Award in 1992.

Footage from the February 1992 Tokyo Dome shows was released that December as Use Your Illusion World Tour – 1992 in Tokyo I and II. In early 1993, the band scaled the production back for the final leg, known as the Skin N' Bones Tour. The stage was smaller, the band dropped the horn section and backup singers, and a mid-set acoustic segment (typically performed with the band seated on a couch) became a regular feature; Brian May opened several North American and European dates. The tour concluded on July 17, 1993, at River Plate Stadium in Buenos Aires, the last show featuring Sorum and Clarke, and the last time Slash performed with the band until 2016.

==== "The Spaghetti Incident?" ====
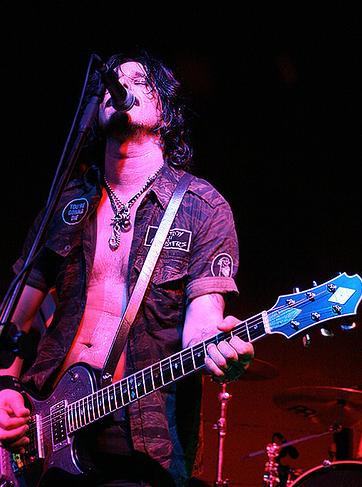
Gilby Clarke replaced Izzy Stradlin as rhythm guitarist, playing from 1991 to 1994.

Initially, the band planned to release an EP of covers in 1992 or 1993, but decided to record a full album. Their fifth studio album, "The Spaghetti Incident?", (Note: The title references an incident Steven Adler had in 1989; while the band was temporarily staying at an apartment in Chicago. Adler stored his drugs in a refrigerator next to the band's takeout containers, which contained Italian food. McKagan explained that Adler's code word for his stash was 'spaghetti'. In his lawsuit against the band, Adler's lawyer asked the band to "tell us about the spaghetti incident", which the band found amusing and used as the title of the album.) a collection of punk and glam rock covers, was released on November 23, 1993. The album features covers of songs by punk and glam artists including U.K. Subs, the Damned, New York Dolls, the Stooges, Dead Boys, Misfits, Johnny Thunders, the Professionals and FEAR, as well as T. Rex, Nazareth, Soundgarden and the Skyliners. The lead single, "Ain't It Fun", featured Hanoi Rocks singer Michael Monroe as a guest vocalist. A second single, a cover of the Skyliners' "Since I Don't Have You", reached number 10 on the UK Singles Chart in 1994 and number 69 on the Billboard Hot 100. The album debuted at number 4 on the Billboard 200 and sold 190,000 copies its first week, and was certified platinum by the RIAA in January 1994. It peaked at number 2 on the UK Albums Chart, behind Meat Loaf's Bat Out of Hell II: Back into Hell, and number 1 in Australia.

Many of the tracks were recorded during the same sessions as the Illusion albums, which were originally intended to produce three or four albums. Stradlin's guitar parts were reportedly re-recorded entirely by Gilby Clarke. (Note: Clarke later disputed the claim, stating "Izzy didn't play on a lot of them, so I got to just put my parts on songs that were recorded. So it was a little bit of both.") Slash described the recording as "spontaneous and unpainted", and said recording the songs served as "a purpose to alleviate the pressure of making the Illusions records". The band wanted to increase the profile of some of their favorite bands and help them financially via royalties with the tracklist selection, and considered naming the album "Pension Fund".

The album includes a hidden track, a cover of "Look at Your Game, Girl", originally by cult leader Charles Manson. The track was kept secret and left off advance tapes sent to reviewers. The inclusion of the song caused controversy, with law enforcement and victims rights groups expressing outrage. Rose said, "we wanted to downplay it. We don't give any credit to Charles Manson on the album". Label president David Geffen said, "[If] Rose had realized how offensive people would find this, he would not have ever recorded this song". Slash said the song was "done with naive and innocent black humor on our part". Rose initially said he would donate all performance royalties from the song to a nonprofit environmental organization. The band was going to remove the song before learning that the royalties would instead go to the son of one of Manson's victims. Geffen Records said its share of royalties would be donated to the Doris Tate Crime Victims Bureau. Slash later said the controversy "killed" the album in the United States, and that Geffen told staff not to work the record.

Reviews were mixed. Entertainment Weekly praised the album's scaled-back sound compared with the Illusion albums, and Robert Christgau of The Village Voice also gave it a positive review. Roger Morton of NME was amused despite his initial skepticism, while Caren Myers of Melody Maker dismissed the band's attempt at punk credibility. In Rolling Stone, Jonathan Gold argued that the covers showed the band to be a glam rock band rather than a punk one. In 2024, Classic Rock's Dave Everley wrote that the initial reviews "veered between the perplexed and the hostile".

The band did not tour in support of "The Spaghetti Incident?". The Use Your Illusion Tour, which comprised 192 shows in 27 countries, had ended in Buenos Aires on July 17, 1993, four months before the album's release, and Rolling Stone later described the band as exhausted by its final show. Slash said the album was conceived mainly as a stopgap to tide fans over until the band completed the follow-up to the Illusion albums. It is the band's worst-selling studio album, having sold 1 million copies in the United States by 2018.

=== Lineup changes and sporadic activity (1994–1998) ===
Between 1994 and 1996, the band sporadically recorded new material. According to Matt Sorum, in 1996, the band had recorded seven songs, with seven more in the writing stages, and intended to release a single album with 10 or 12 songs in spring 1997. In May 1994, Gilby Clarke said work on the next Guns N' Roses album had ended. Rose said the material was scrapped due to the lack of collaboration between band members: "We still needed the collaboration of the band as a whole to write the best songs. Since none of that happened, that's the reason why that material got scrapped." The album was described by McKagan as consisting of "up-tempo rock songs" with "no ballads". Sorum said that It's Five O'Clock Somewhere, the debut album from Slash's band Slash's Snakepit, "could have been a Guns N' Roses album, but Axl didn't think it was good enough".

In 1994, all of the then-current members of the band contributed to Gilby Clarke's debut album, Pawnshop Guitars. In December 1994, GN'R released a cover of the Rolling Stones' "Sympathy for the Devil". The song appeared in the films Interview with the Vampire and Fallen and was released as a single. Entertainment Weekly stated that the "note-for-note remake works up a decent lather but seems utterly bankrupt". The recording featured Rose's childhood friend and Hollywood Rose collaborator Paul "Huge" Tobias on rhythm guitar.

Tobias's presence in the band created tension; Slash had "creative and personal differences" with Tobias. A 2001 interview revealed Slash told his bandmates in September 1996, "I'm going to confront it. Either Paul goes, or [I go]."

The music was going in a direction that was completely indulgent to his friend [Huge] ... And another factor is this guy that Axl brought in and told us, 'This is our new guitar player' ... There was no democracy there. And that's when Slash really started going, 'Fuck this. What, this is his band now? or something?' ... It was ridiculous. I'd go down there to start rehearsal at 10, and Axl would show up at four or five in the morning. That sort of thing was going on for a couple of years.

— Duff McKagan

Gilby Clarke's contract was not renewed and he was gone from the band by 1995. Slash stated in his book that Rose fired Clarke without consulting anyone, claiming he was a "hired hand". Clarke was not involved in the recording of "Sympathy for the Devil": "I knew that that was the ending because nobody told me about it". Clarke mentioned that before the final show of the Use Your Illusion Tour, Rose told him "Hey, enjoy your last show". Clarke later sued the band over the use of his likeness in Guns N' Roses Pinball.

In August 1995, Rose legally left the band and created a new partnership under the band's name. Rose later stated that he took this step "to salvage Guns not steal it". Rose reportedly purchased the full rights to the Guns N' Roses name in 1997. Slash claimed he and bandmates signed over the name under duress: "Axl refused to go onstage one night during the Use Your Illusion tour in 1992 unless the band signed away the name rights to the band. Unfortunately, we signed it. I didn't think he'd go on stage otherwise." Rose denied the claim, saying "(it) Never happened, all made up, fallacy and fantasy. Not one single solitary thread of truth to it. Had that been the case I would have been cremated years ago legally, could've cleaned me out for the name and damages. It's called under duress with extenuating circumstances."

In 1996, Rose, Slash, McKagan, and former member Izzy Stradlin guested on Anxious Disease, the debut album by the Outpatience. This would be the last material the four classic-era band members worked on together.

The recording of "Sympathy for the Devil", coupled with tension between Slash and Rose, led the former to quit the band officially in October 1996. Rose sent a fax notifying MTV of the departure, and Slash responded: "Axl and I have not been capable of seeing eye to eye on Guns N' Roses for some time. We tried to collaborate, but at this point, I'm no longer in the band." Slash stated, "Axl's whole visionary style, as far as his input in Guns N' Roses, is completely different from mine. I just like to play guitar, write a good riff, go out there and play, as opposed to presenting an image."

Slash was replaced by Nine Inch Nails touring guitarist Robin Finck in January 1997. He signed a two-year contract with the band in August 1997, making him an official member. Finck was originally recommended by Matt Sorum to Rose a year earlier as a possible second guitarist to complement Slash. Slash's departure was followed by the departure of Matt Sorum in April 1997. Rose fired Sorum after an argument over Tobias's inclusion in the band. Sorum later stated that Tobias was the "Yoko Ono of Guns N' Roses".

Rose auditioned multiple potential members, including multi-instrumentalist Chris Vrenna and guitarist Zakk Wylde, alongside drummers Dave Abbruzzese, Michael Bland, Joey Castillo and Kellii Scott from Failure. Rolling Stone reported in April 1997 that the lineup of Guns N' Roses was Rose, McKagan, Tobias, Finck & Vrenna. (Note: Though not considered an official member, Vrenna worked with the band for several months in studio.)

McKagan was the last of the Appetite lineup to leave, resigning as bassist in August 1997. McKagan had recently become a father and wrote about his decision to leave in his autobiography: "Guns had been paying rent on studios for three years now—from 1994 to 1997—and still did not have a single song. The whole operation was so erratic that it didn't seem to fit with my hopes for parenthood, for stability." Josh Freese was ultimately hired to replace Sorum on drums, joining in the summer of 1997. After being recommended by Freese, former Replacements bassist Tommy Stinson joined in 1998, replacing McKagan. By the end of 1998, a new version of Guns N' Roses had emerged: Rose on lead vocals, Stinson on bass, Freese on drums, Finck on lead guitar, Tobias on rhythm guitar, Reed on keyboards, and multi-instrumentalist Chris Pitman. (Note: Pitman, previously of Lusk, was recommended to the group by engineer Billy Howerdel.)

In 1998, Geffen released an edited single-disc version of the Illusion albums titled Use Your Illusion. In November 1999, the label released Live Era '87–'93, a collection of live performances from various concerts during the Appetite for Destruction and Use Your Illusion tours. Former guitarist Slash described the selection of songs of the album as a "very mutual effort", adding that "the live album was one of the easiest projects we all worked on. I didn't actually see Axl, but we communicated via the powers that be."

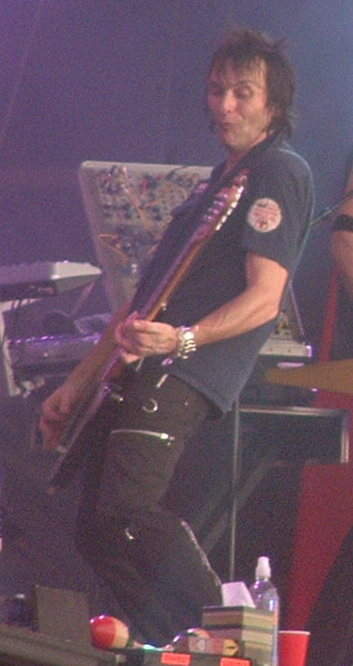
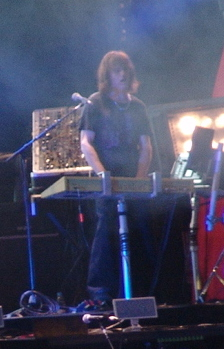
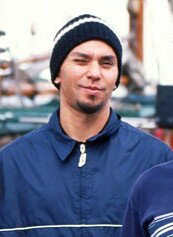
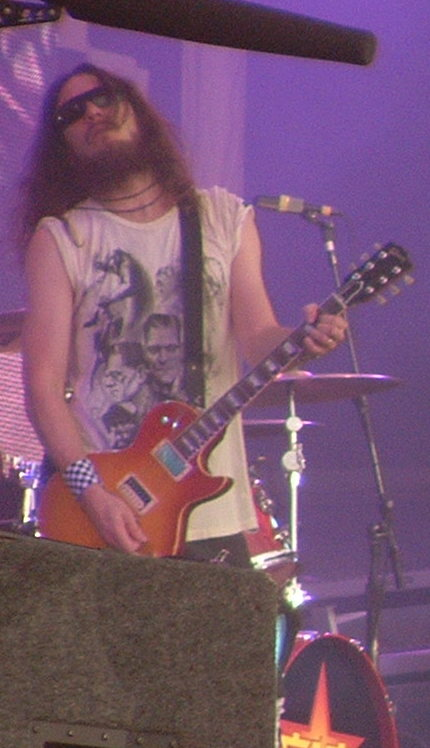
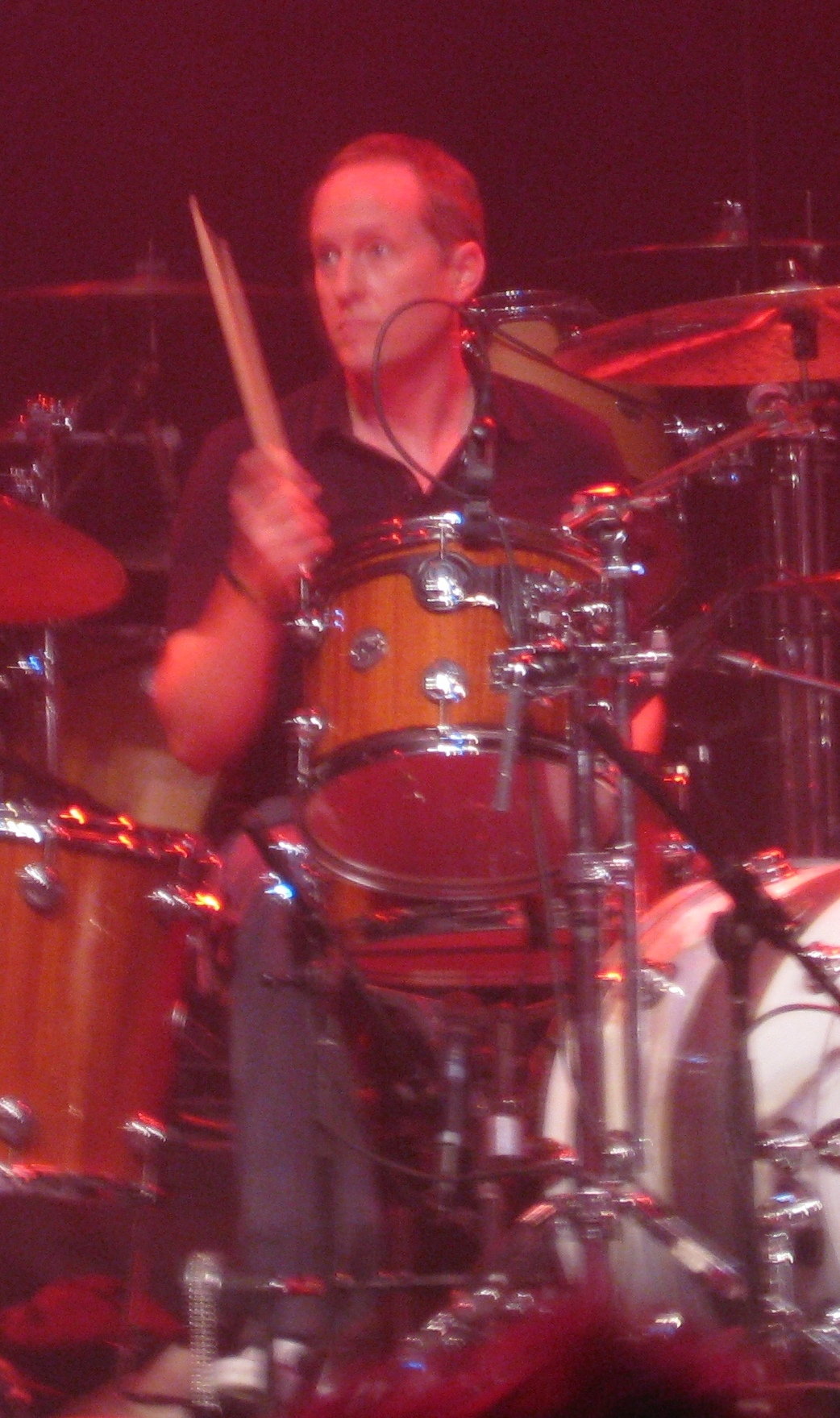
Tommy Stinson, Chris Pitman, Brain, Robin Finck & Josh Freese all joined the band in the late 1990s.

=== New lineups and Chinese Democracy (1998–2008) ===
==== Early recording sessions ====
A new Guns N' Roses album had reportedly been in the works since 1994, with Rose the only original member still in the band. Several producers, including Youth, Moby, Mike Clink, Eric Caudieux & Sean Beavan worked with the band during the late 1990s, incorporating new electronic and industrial elements to the music. (Note: Rose and Caram Costanzo are the credited producers on the album.) Rolling Stone stated that the label planned for the album to be released in late 1999. By August 1999, the band had recorded over 30 songs for the album, which was tentatively entitled 2000 Intentions. In November 1999, during an interview with Kurt Loder for MTV, Rose said that he had re-recorded Appetite for Destruction with the then-new band, apart from two songs which he had replaced with "Patience" and "You Could Be Mine". During the interview, Rose announced the title of the upcoming album, Chinese Democracy. Rose explained:

There's a lot of Chinese democracy movements, and it's something that there's a lot of talk about, and it's something that will be nice to see. It could also just be like an ironic statement. I don't know, I just like the sound of it. (The album has) a lot of different sounds. There's some heavy songs, there's a lot of aggressive songs, but they're all in different styles and different sounds. It is truly a melting pot.

Band manager Doug Goldstein said in November 1999 that the band had "almost finished" recording the music, and the album was due out sometime in 2000. Later that month, the band released a new song, the industrial styled "Oh My God", which was included on the soundtrack of the film End of Days. The track featured additional guitar work by Dave Navarro and Gary Sunshine, Rose's personal guitar teacher. Rose claimed that former members Duff McKagan and Matt Sorum had "failed to see the potential" of the song and had no interest in recording or playing the piece.

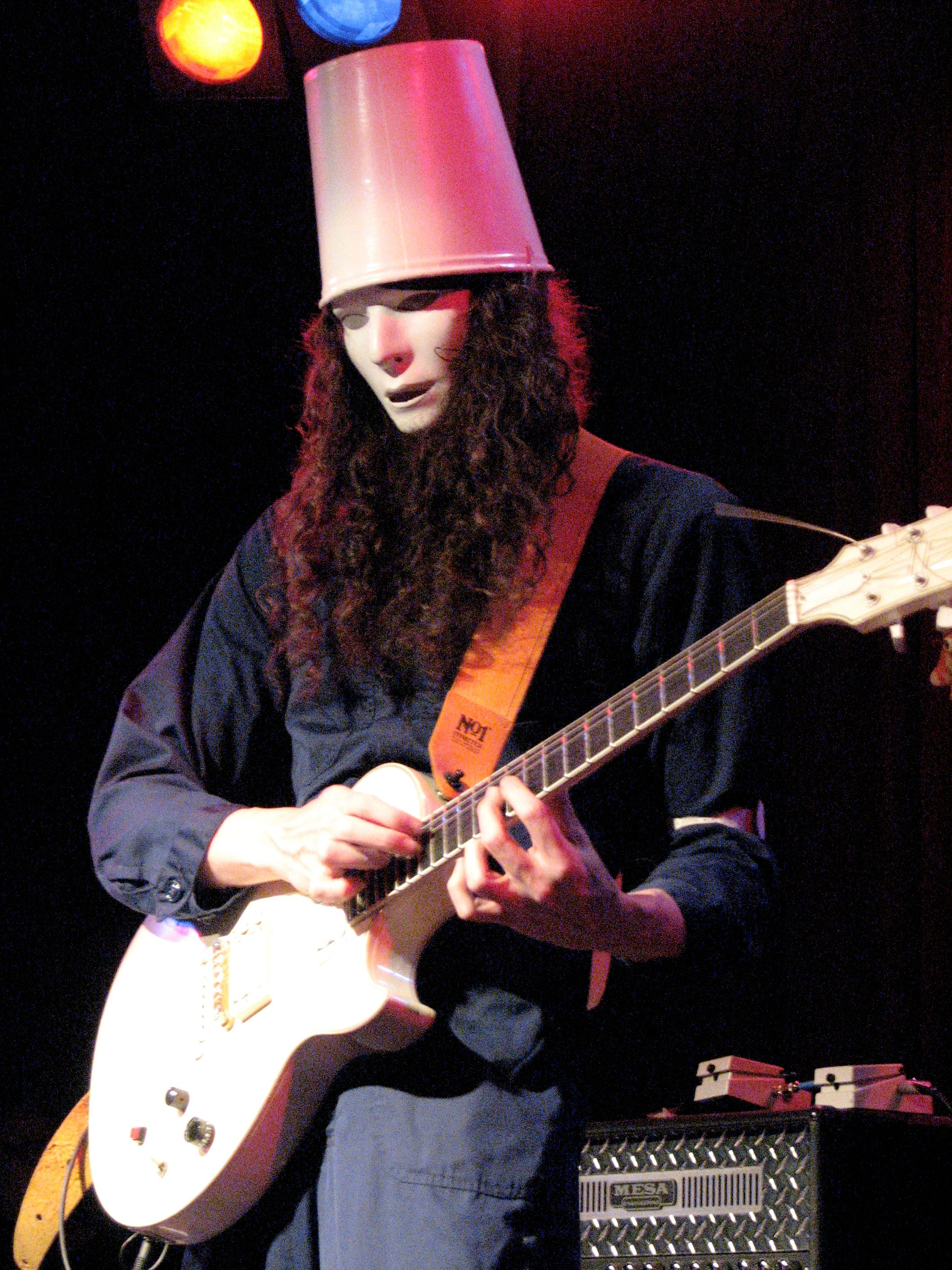
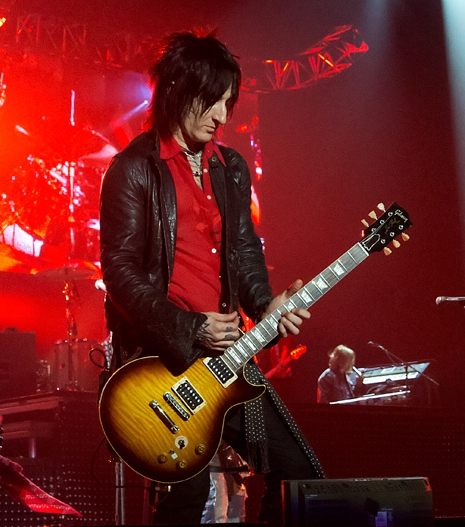
Buckethead was the band's lead guitarist from 2000 to 2004, while Richard Fortus joined on rhythm guitar in 2002.

In August 1999, guitarist Robin Finck departed the band to rejoin his former band, Nine Inch Nails, on tour. In March 2000, avant-garde guitarist Brian Carroll, more commonly referred to as Buckethead, joined Guns N' Roses as a replacement for Finck. Also in March 2000, drummer Josh Freese left the band. He was replaced by former Primus drummer Bryan Mantia, known professionally as Brain. (Note: Mantia had previously worked with Buckethead in several bands, including Praxis.) Finck returned to the band in late 2000, to complement Buckethead on lead guitar. With the album nearing completion in mid-2000, producer Roy Thomas Baker convinced Rose to re-record it, causing further delays.

==== Return to touring and cancellations (2001–2002) ====
In an interview with Rolling Stone in February 2000, Rose played several songs of the upcoming album to reporters, including "Chinese Democracy", "Catcher in the Rye", "I.R.S.", "The Blues", "There Was a Time" and "Oklahoma". Rose mentioned that part of the delay of the new album was him "educating himself about the technology that's come to define rock", stating that "it's like from scratch, learning how to work with something, and not wanting it just to be something you did on a computer." Rolling Stone described the album as "Led Zeppelin's Physical Graffiti remixed by Beck and Trent Reznor. Rose mentioned that the expense of the record would be negated by the recording sessions yielding multiple albums, including a record that is "more industrial and electronica-influenced than Chinese Democracy". In a 2001 interview, Rose described the album as having "all kinds of styles, many influences as blues, mixed in the songs" and said that it was "not industrial".

Describing why he continued using the Guns N' Roses name, instead of labeling the upcoming album an "Axl Rose solo album", Rose stated, "There were other people in Guns N' Roses before them, you know. I contemplated letting go of that, but it doesn't feel right in any way. I am not the person who chose to try to kill it and walked away. ... Everybody is putting everything they've got into singing and building. Maybe I'm helping steer it to what it should be built like." Also in the interview, Rose attributed the breakup of the old lineup to drug addictions and "an effort from inside the band to destroy him", stating "There was an effort to bring me down. It was a king-of-the-mountain thing", and that he "needed to take control to survive", also describing the dissolution as "a divorce".

Eight years after the previous Guns N' Roses concert, the band made a public appearance in January 2001 with two well-received concerts: one in Las Vegas and one at the Rock in Rio Festival in Rio de Janeiro. The band played both songs from previous albums and songs from then-unreleased Chinese Democracy. During the band's Rock in Rio set, Rose made the following comment regarding former members of the band:

I know that many of you are disappointed that some of the people you came to know and love could not be with us here today. Regardless of what you have heard or read, people worked very hard (meaning my former friends) to do everything they could so that I could not be here today. I am as hurt and disappointed as you that unlike Oasis, we could not find a way to all get along.

External image
- Rose and Buckethead during Guns N' Roses's performance at Pukkelpop 2002

The group played two shows in Las Vegas at the end of 2001. Former guitarist Slash claimed that he tried to attend a show and was turned away at the door by security. Due to his frustrations with touring, rhythm guitarist Paul Tobias left the band in 2002 and was replaced by Richard Fortus (formerly of the Psychedelic Furs and Love Spit Love). (Note: Fortus is good friends with and had previously collaborated with bassist Tommy Stinson, who recommended him for the position. Fortus was considered to replace Finck in 1999 before Buckethead was hired.)

The band then played several shows in August 2002, headlining festivals and concerts throughout Asia and Europe, including Pukkelpop, Summer Sonic Festival, and The Carling Weekend. At the 2002 MTV Video Music Awards on August 29, 2002, Guns N' Roses closed the show in a previously unannounced performance, playing "Welcome to the Jungle", "Madagascar", and "Paradise City".

In November 2002, the band's first North American tour since 1993 was organized to support Chinese Democracy, with CKY and Mix Master Mike joining. However, the venue canceled the opening show in Vancouver when Rose failed to show up. According to Guns' management, "Axl's flight from L.A. had been delayed by mechanical troubles". A riot ensued. The tour was met with mixed results, some concerts did not sell well, while shows in larger markets such as New York City sold out in minutes. Due to a second riot by fans in Philadelphia when the band failed to show up again, tour promoter Clear Channel canceled the remainder of the tour. (Note: Rose mentioned in 2006 that legal issues prevented him from speaking about the shows, and stated in 2012 "I'm not saying I'm innocent" while apologizing to the city.)

Guns N' Roses tour canceled. Typical. And freakishly expected. Haha. Really bad idea. I wouldn't suggest they come back.

— Opening band CKY

==== Label conflict, Greatest Hits, and lawsuits ====
In September 2003, Eddie Trunk played a previously unheard track, "I.R.S.", on his radio show, given to him by baseball player Mike Piazza. The band management heard about the nationwide leak, and obtained a cease and desist order for all stations that had a copy of the track. Rose had played several new songs at a strip club in Las Vegas two months earlier to gauge the reactions of the crowd.

In February 2004, Geffen said, "Having exceeded all budgeted and approved recording costs by millions of dollars, it is Mr. Rose's obligation to fund and complete the album, not Geffen's." By March 2004, Geffen had pulled funding from Chinese Democracy. Around then, band manager Merck Mercuriadis stated that "The 'Chinese Democracy' album is very close to being completed". According to a 2005 report by The New York Times, Rose had allegedly spent $13 million ($21,430,397 in current dollar terms) in the studio by that point. Mercuriadis rejected the budget claims made by The New York Times, claiming the sources had not been involved in the project in several years. The album was frequently described as "the most expensive album ever made". (Note: Michael Jackson's Invincible (2001) allegedly had a $30 million production, though $25 million of that was for marketing.)

In March 2004, since Rose had failed to deliver a new studio album in more than ten years, Geffen released Guns N' Roses' Greatest Hits. Slash and McKagan joined Rose in suing Geffen to stop the release of the album, which was compiled without authorization from any current or former band members. The lawsuit was thrown out and the album went triple platinum in the US, eventually going on to be the third-longest-charting album in the Nielsen SoundScan era. McKagan and Slash also joined Rose in an unsuccessful effort to prevent the release of The Roots of Guns N' Roses.

The band was scheduled to play at Rock in Rio Lisboa in May 2004. However, Buckethead left the band in March of that year, causing the band to cancel the show. Buckethead reportedly left the band because of the "inability to complete an album or tour", according to his manager. Rose claimed "the band has been put in an untenable position by guitarist Buckethead and his untimely departure. During his tenure with the band, Buckethead has been inconsistent and erratic in both his behavior and commitment ... His transient lifestyle has made it impossible for even his closest friends to have nearly any form of communication with him whatsoever."

In February 2006, demos of the songs "Better", "Catcher in the Rye", "I.R.S.", and "There Was a Time" were leaked on to the Internet through a Guns N' Roses fan site. The band's management requested that all links to the MP3 files and all lyrics to the songs be removed from forums and websites. Despite this, radio stations began adding "I.R.S." to playlists, and the song reached No. 49 on the Radio & Records Active Rock National Airplay chart in the final week of February.

In August 2006, Slash and McKagan sued Rose over publishing and songwriting credits, which Rose's lawyer claimed were due to a "clerical error" while changing publishers.

==== Resumed touring and release delays (2006–2007) ====
Following a recommendation from guitar virtuoso Joe Satriani, guitarist Ron "Bumblefoot" Thal joined Guns N' Roses in 2006, replacing Buckethead. Thal made his live debut with the band at the Hammerstein Ballroom in New York City on May 12, 2006, the band's first live show in over three years.

Five warm-up shows before a North American tour were held in September 2006. The tour officially commenced on October 24 in Miami. Drummer Frank Ferrer replaced Brain, who took a leave of absence to be with his wife and newborn child. (Note: Ferrer had previously worked with Richard Fortus in the Psychedelic Furs and Love Spit Love and had been a member of several other bands, including The Beautiful.) Coinciding with the tour, the song "Better" was featured in an internet advertisement for Harley-Davidson in October 2006. Keyboardist Dizzy Reed stated that the release was an accident, with two versions being made—one "experimental edit" featuring a demo of "Better" and one with "Paradise City". The ad with "Better" was mislabeled and inadvertently uploaded online for a day before being replaced by the intended ad with "Paradise City".

In November 2006, shows in Portland, Maine were cancelled, with the band claiming that the cancellations were "due to limitations imposed by local fire marshals". Rose later apologized in a statement, stating "We have chosen to take the public heat for these events in order to have another shot at the future today with a new album."

In December 2006, Rose released an open letter to fans announcing that Merck Mercuriadis had been fired as the band's manager. He revealed that the last four dates of the North American tour would be cut so the band could work on post-production for Chinese Democracy. He also set a tentative release date for the album for the first time since the album's announcement: March 6, 2007.

On February 23, 2007, Del James announced that the recording stage of Chinese Democracy was finished and the band had now moved onto mixing the album. However, this proved that March 6 release date would be impossible to achieve, and the album once again had no scheduled release date.

In February 2007, the "final" version of "Better" leaked online to positive reviews. On May 4, 2007, three more tracks leaked from Chinese Democracy: An updated version of "I.R.S.", "The Blues", and the title track. All three tracks had previously been played live.

Guns N' Roses embarked on the 2007 leg of the Chinese Democracy World Tour in Mexico in June, followed by dates in Australia and Japan. The songs "Nice Boys" and "Don't Cry" (appearing as an instrumental Bumblefoot solo) were played for the first time since the Use Your Illusion Tour. The tour ended on the twentieth anniversary of Appetite for Destruction's release date, in Osaka. During this tour, the band featured vocalist Axl Rose, Robin Finck, Ron Thal and Richard Fortus on guitars, Tommy Stinson on bass, Dizzy Reed and Chris Pitman on keyboards and Frank Ferrer on drums.

==== Album release and promotion ====
Drummer Frank Ferrer joined the band in 2006.

In December 2007, Eddie Trunk reported that the album was done and handed over to Geffen Records, but delayed due to issues with the label. The following month, reports that the delays were disagreements between Geffen and Rose on marketing emerged. In February 2008, Rose's manager, Beta Lebeis, debunked Trunk's suggestion and stated the band is "in negotiations" with the record label, and the album had been finished since Christmas 2007.

On March 26, 2008, Dr Pepper announced a plan to give everyone in America – except the band's former guitarists Slash and Buckethead – a free can of Dr Pepper if the band released Chinese Democracy before the end of 2008. Rose stated he was "surprised and very happy" about the announcement, adding, "As some of Buckethead's performances are on our album, I'll share my Dr Pepper with him." (Note: After the album was announced, Dr Pepper announced coupons for a free Dr Pepper on November 23, 2008. However, due to "heavy volume" on the server throughout the entire day, it was impossible to submit for a free coupon. The band condemned Dr Pepper for the failed promotion, with Rose's lawyer demanding a full-page apology in several major newspapers. Rose later said he was taken off-guard by his lawyer's actions, believing they should have been focused on the record release.)

Guns N' Roses "Chinese Democracy" (2008)
Sample of "Chinese Democracy" from Chinese Democracy. It is the first single released by Guns N' Roses since 1994. The song represented a shift in style for the band towards industrial rock.

On March 27, 2008, the day after Dr Pepper's announcement, the band members announced that they had hired a new management team, headed by Irving Azoff and Andy Gould.

Amidst industry rumors in April 2008 that a release was coming soon, nine tracks purported to be from Chinese Democracy were leaked to a website on June 19, 2008, but were quickly removed due to a cease-and-desist letter from the band's label. Six of the leaked tracks had surfaced previously in some form, while three were new. On July 14, 2008, Harmonix, in conjunction with MTV Games, officially announced the release of a new song from Chinese Democracy. The song, entitled "Shackler's Revenge", was released through the new game Rock Band 2. (Note: The entire album was eventually added to the game as DLC in April 2009.) The song "If the World" debuted October 10, 2008, playing in the end credits of the Ridley Scott film Body of Lies.

On October 22, 2008, after several months of speculation, band management, Best Buy, and Interscope Geffen A&M Records issued a joint press release confirming that the much-anticipated release of Chinese Democracy in the US had been scheduled for November 23, 2008, as a Best Buy exclusive. Several days before its official release, the band streamed the entire Chinese Democracy album on the group's Myspace page. The album was streamed over three million times, breaking the Myspace record for most streamed album ever.

Chinese Democracy, the band's sixth studio album and its first since 1993's "The Spaghetti Incident?" was released on November 22, 2008, in Europe and Australia, on November 23, 2008, in North America, and on November 24, 2008, in the United Kingdom. Chinese Democracy debuted at No. 3 on the Billboard 200 but undersold industry expectations. The album's divided reception led to it being included on several publication's year end worst-of lists, (Note: Time Out New York, Asbury Park Press, IGN and Chicago Tribune) as well of best-of lists. (Note: ABC News, The Guardian, Rolling Stone, Ultimate Classic Rock, & Spin)

=== Touring and Hall of Fame induction (2009–2014) ===
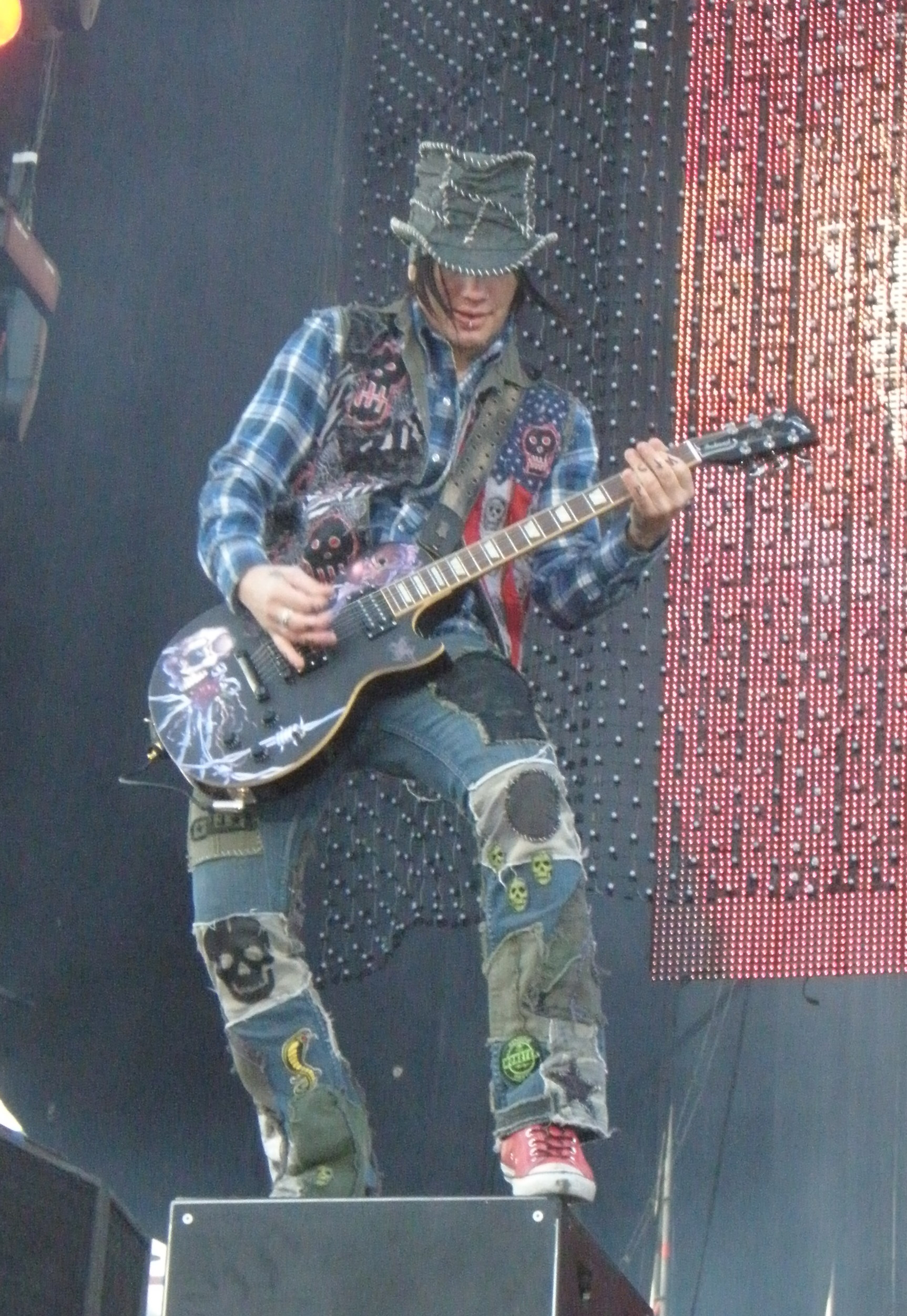
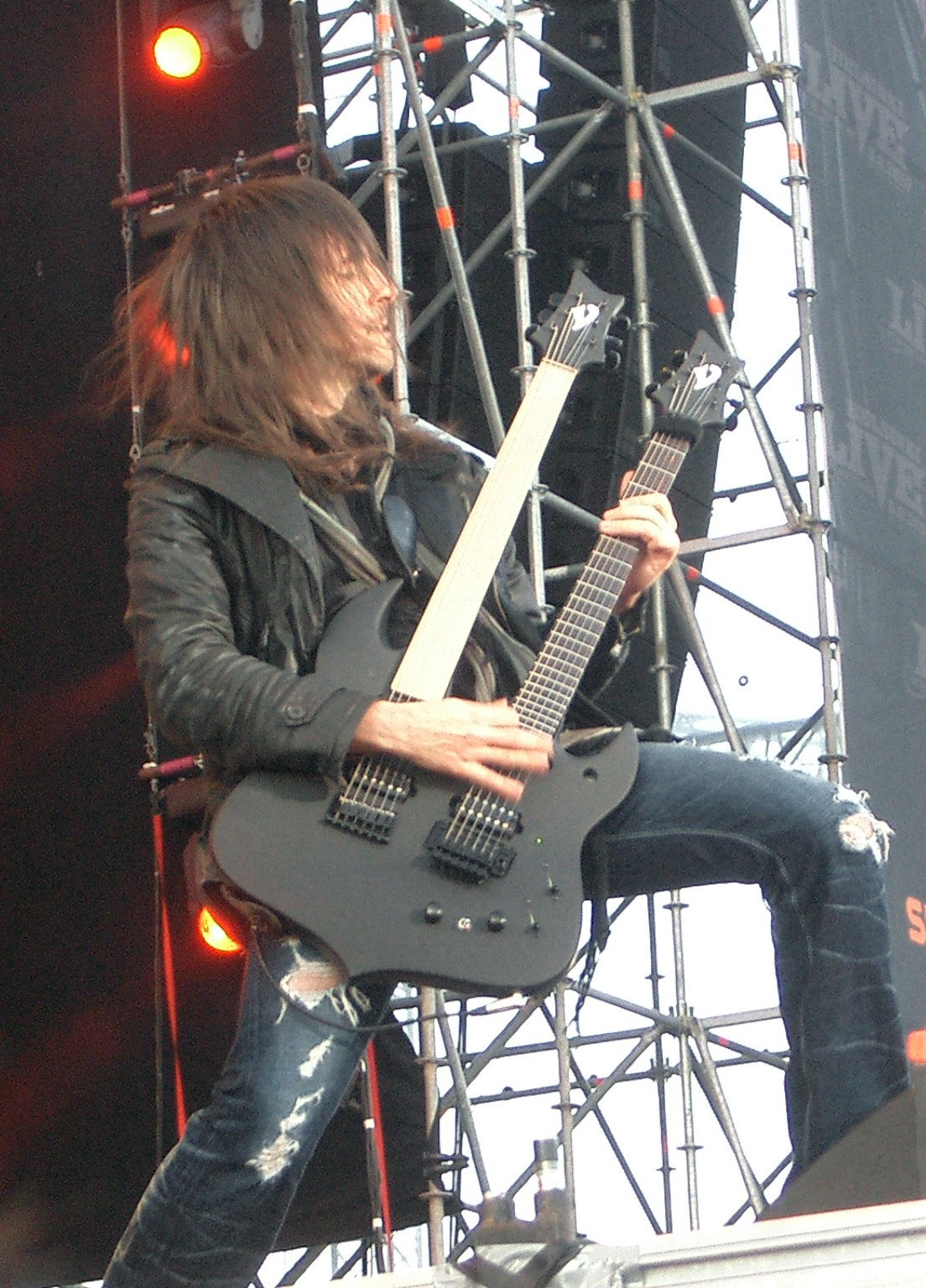
DJ Ashba was the band's lead guitarist from 2009 to 2015, and Ron "Bumblefoot" Thal was the band's lead guitarist from 2006 to 2014.

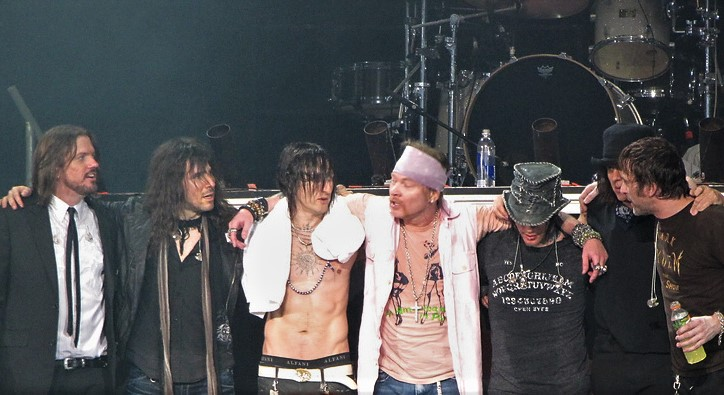
Guns N' Roses in 2010. From left to right: Dizzy Reed, Ron "Bumblefoot" Thal, Richard Fortus, Axl Rose, DJ Ashba, Chris Pitman, and Tommy Stinson. Drummer Frank Ferrer is not pictured.

On February 6, 2009, Rose gave his first interview in nine years when he sat down with Billboard's Jonathan Cohen. Rose said that there was no chance that he would ever agree to a reunion with Slash:

What's clear is that one of the two of us will die before a reunion and however sad, ugly or unfortunate anyone views it, it is how it is. Those decisions were made a long time ago and reiterated year after year by one man.

Rose, however, stated that he was open to working again with Stradlin and McKagan:

I could see doing a song or so on the side with Izzy or having him out [on tour] again. I'm not so comfortable with doing anything having more than one of the alumni. Maybe something with Duff, but that's it, and not something I'd have to really get down into, as I'd get left with sorting it out and then blamed on top of it. So, no, not me.

In March 2009, the band announced that DJ Ashba would be the new lead guitarist, replacing a departing Robin Finck, who rejoined Nine Inch Nails. (Note: Ashba had previously played with former drummer Steven Adler in BulletBoys in 1998.)

In June 2009, it was reported that manager Irving Azoff had been "fired, then re-hired, then fired". A year later, Azoff's company Front Line Management sued Rose, claiming he "violated an oral agreement to pay 15% of earnings, or nearly $2 million, from a lucrative concert tour" and seeking $1.87 million in unpaid fees. Rose filed a $5 million counter-lawsuit against Azoff, saying that Azoff sabotaged sales of Guns N' Roses' comeback album, attempted to force Rose to reunite with his estranged former bandmates, failed to promote Chinese Democracy, and filed suit for "commissions he didn't earn and had no right to receive". The lawsuit was settled in 2011. Several years later, Guns N' Roses' management, led by Rose's former personal assistant Beta Lebeis and her family, stated that previous tensions led to an ultimatum of "no more managers".

Guns N' Roses headlined the Friday night at Reading Festival 2010 and closed Leeds Festival two days later. Guns N' Roses was 58 minutes late coming on to the stage, and because of a curfew issued by Reading Council the band's set ended at midnight. Rose orchestrated fan frustration toward the organizers, citing the strict curfew. Further late showings caused issues; during a concert on September 1, 2010, in Dublin, the band was over an hour late arriving on stage. Rose stopped the band in the middle of the second song, "Welcome to the Jungle", after multiple bottles were thrown on stage to warn the crowd. After another bottle was thrown, the band left the stage during the fourth song of the set. The band returned to the stage an hour later to finish the show.

Former bassist Duff McKagan joined the band on stage for the first time since leaving the band on October 14, 2010, at The O2 Arena, in London, England. He performed four songs with the group: "You Could Be Mine", "Nice Boys", "Knockin' on Heaven's Door", and "Patience". The appearance was said to be a spur-of-the-moment decision, as he and Rose happened to be staying in the same hotel. Rose told the audience, "There was this guy at the end of my hallway playing all this loud music and shit. What the fuck? Oh—it's Duff!". McKagan later joined Guns N' Roses for two Seattle shows in December 2011 and had his band Loaded open for Guns N' Roses.

Guns N' Roses performed at Rock in Rio 4 on October 2, 2011, during heavy rain, playing "Estranged" for the first time since 1993. Guitarist Bumblefoot stated that due to the conditions, it was the "worst concert he's ever been a part of". Two months later, during a performance in Nashville, Tennessee, "Civil War" also made a return after an eighteen-year absence. On November 10, 2011, Rose gave his first TV interview in years to Eddie Trunk, Don Jamieson and Jim Florentine of That Metal Show, discussing his whole career and the band's future.

Izzy Stradlin joined the band for a surprise performance at a wedding in Saint-Tropez, France, in July 2012. Also in July 2012, the band toured Israel for the first time since 1992. NME reported that year that the band's tour security said they had been instructed by Guns N' Roses' management that anyone wearing a Slash T-shirt not be allowed into the tour venue.

==== Rock and Roll Hall of Fame induction ====
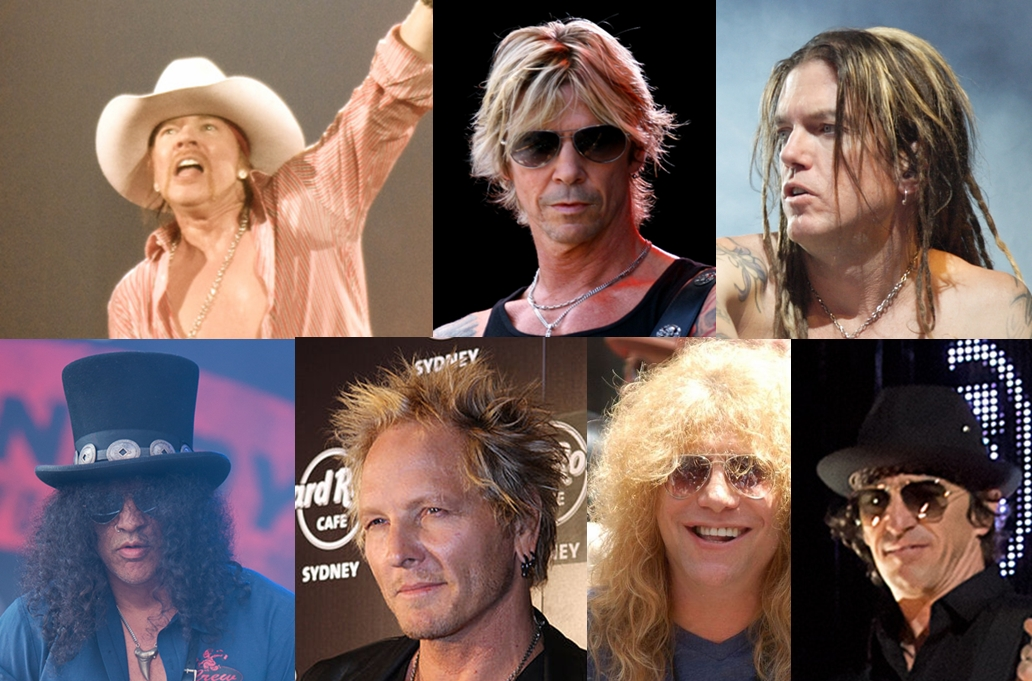
The members of Guns N' Roses inducted into the Rock and Roll Hall of Fame. Top row: Axl Rose, Duff McKagan, Dizzy Reed. Bottom Row: Slash, Matt Sorum, Steven Adler, Izzy Stradlin.

Guns N' Roses were nominated for the Rock and Roll Hall of Fame in 2011 and were inducted in their first year of eligibility. The seven inductees were Rose, Slash, McKagan, Stradlin, Adler, Sorum and Reed. On April 14, 2012, at a ceremony in Cleveland, the band was inducted by Billie Joe Armstrong of Green Day, who praised Appetite for Destruction as the greatest debut album in rock history. Slash, McKagan, Adler, Sorum and Clarke reunited for the induction. Clarke, who was not inducted, performed at the request of Sorum. The band performed "Mr. Brownstone", "Sweet Child o' Mine", and "Paradise City", with Myles Kennedy of Alter Bridge on lead vocals. Sorum played drums on "Mr. Brownstone", while Adler, whom Sorum had replaced in 1990, played on the other two songs. In his acceptance remarks, Adler thanked fans by quoting Queen's "We Are the Champions". The ceremony was broadcast on HBO on May 5, 2012.

Rose did not attend and had asked not to be inducted, writing in an open letter that the Hall of Fame "doesn't appear to be somewhere I'm actually wanted or respected". Stradlin and Reed also declined to attend the induction. In the letter, published on April 11, Rose also asked that no one accept an induction on his behalf or imply that he was included. He also criticized Adler's earlier public comments about a possible reunion. The Hall of Fame responded that it was sorry Rose would not be able to accept his induction in person. Stradlin released a statement thanking the Hall and his former bandmates. Before the ceremony, Slash said that he would have liked to play with the classic lineup but did not expect it to happen, as he had not communicated with Rose in a long time. At the ceremony, the crowd booed Rose's name and chanted "Fuck Axl". Afterwards, Rose released a statement addressed to Cleveland and the band's fans, thanking them for their support of his decision and saying he did not understand the purpose of the Hall of Fame, how it was funded or how acts are chosen. In an interview, Slash said that none of the band initially wanted to take part and were uncertain of how it would proceed.

==== Up Close and Personal Tour and Las Vegas residencies ====
In early 2012, the band announced the upcoming Up Close and Personal Tour, with shows in the United States and Europe. The shows themselves varied considerably in comparison to the previous Chinese Democracy Tour. All of the North American shows took place in smaller-scale clubs, not large arenas or stadiums. All pyrotechnics were removed from the shows.

On August 13, 2012, the band announced a residency at The Joint in Las Vegas entitled "Appetite for Democracy", celebrating the 25th anniversary of Appetite for Destruction and the fourth anniversary of Chinese Democracy. On November 21, 2012, the band's performance in Vegas was taped in 3D and was screened across theaters in 2014 before being released as Appetite for Democracy 3D on July 1, 2014. In October 2012, Guns N' Roses performed an acoustic set at Neil Young's Bridge School Benefit show. The performance was widely panned by critics, and Rose claimed an onset of strep throat hampered his vocals. The band launched a South American tour in early 2014, including shows in Brazil and Portugal. For several shows, former bassist Duff McKagan rejoined the band to fill in for Stinson, who had previous commitments to touring with the Replacements. The group headlined the Revolver Golden Gods awards show, with McKagan on bass, on April 24, 2014. During the ceremony, Rose was awarded the Ronnie James Dio lifetime achievement award.

From May 21 to June 7, 2014, the band returned to Las Vegas for its second residency at The Joint, titled No Trickery! An Evening of Destruction. (Note: The title of the residency was a play on jokes Rose had made about Red Hot Chili Peppers being forced to pantomime their performance at the Super Bowl XLVIII halftime show.)

==== Follow-up to Chinese Democracy ====
In an MTV phone interview with Kurt Loder in 1999, Rose said he and the then-new band had recorded enough material for a double album. In an informal chat with Rolling Stone magazine in February 2006, Rose stated the band had 32 songs in the works. While appearing on various fan message boards in December 2008, Rose stated several working titles of songs for a possible future album. Former drummer Brain mentioned working on a "club remix" of "Shackler's Revenge", stating that Rose planned to put out a remix album of songs from Chinese Democracy. Several band members mentioned they had been collaborating on ideas and working on a new album throughout the late 2000s and early 2010s. In October 2012, Rose said, "All the guys are writing, and we recorded a lot of songs over the years. We'll figure out what we feel best about".

In August 2013, a new song entitled "Going Down" was leaked online. The track features bassist Tommy Stinson on lead vocals, with Rose providing backing vocals. Bumblefoot confirmed the song to be legitimate on his Twitter. Spin described it as "a country-tinged, mid-tempo lighter-raiser with lyrics about how "you've got nothin' good to say / Keep your mouth shut."

In an interview in June 2014, Rose commented on upcoming plans:

We recorded a lot of things before Chinese was out. We've worked more on some of those things and we've written a few new things. But basically, we have what I call kind of the second half of Chinese. That's already recorded. And then we have a remix album made of the songs from Chinese. That's been done for a while, too.

=== Reunion (2015–present) ===
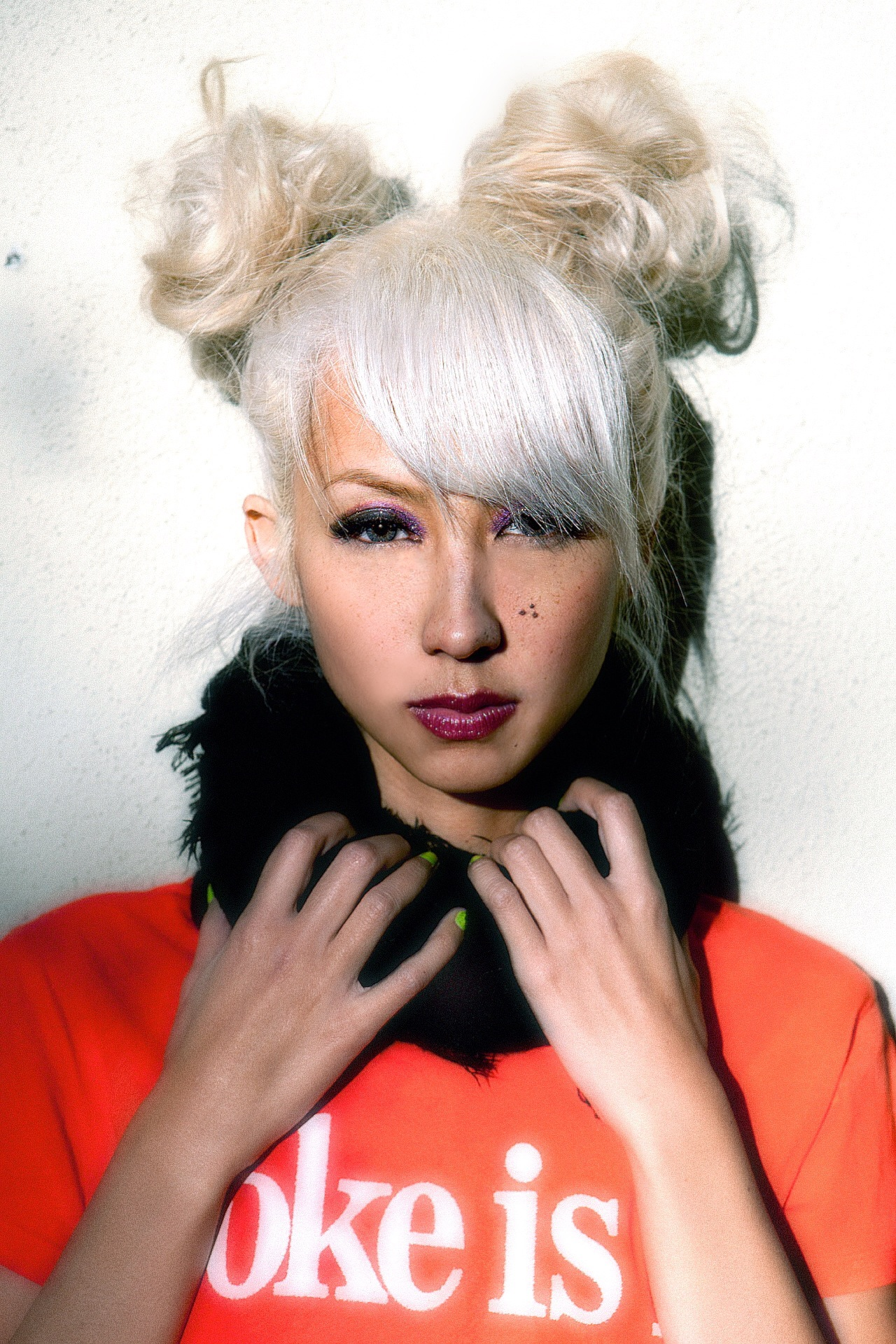
Keyboardist Melissa Reese joined the band in 2016

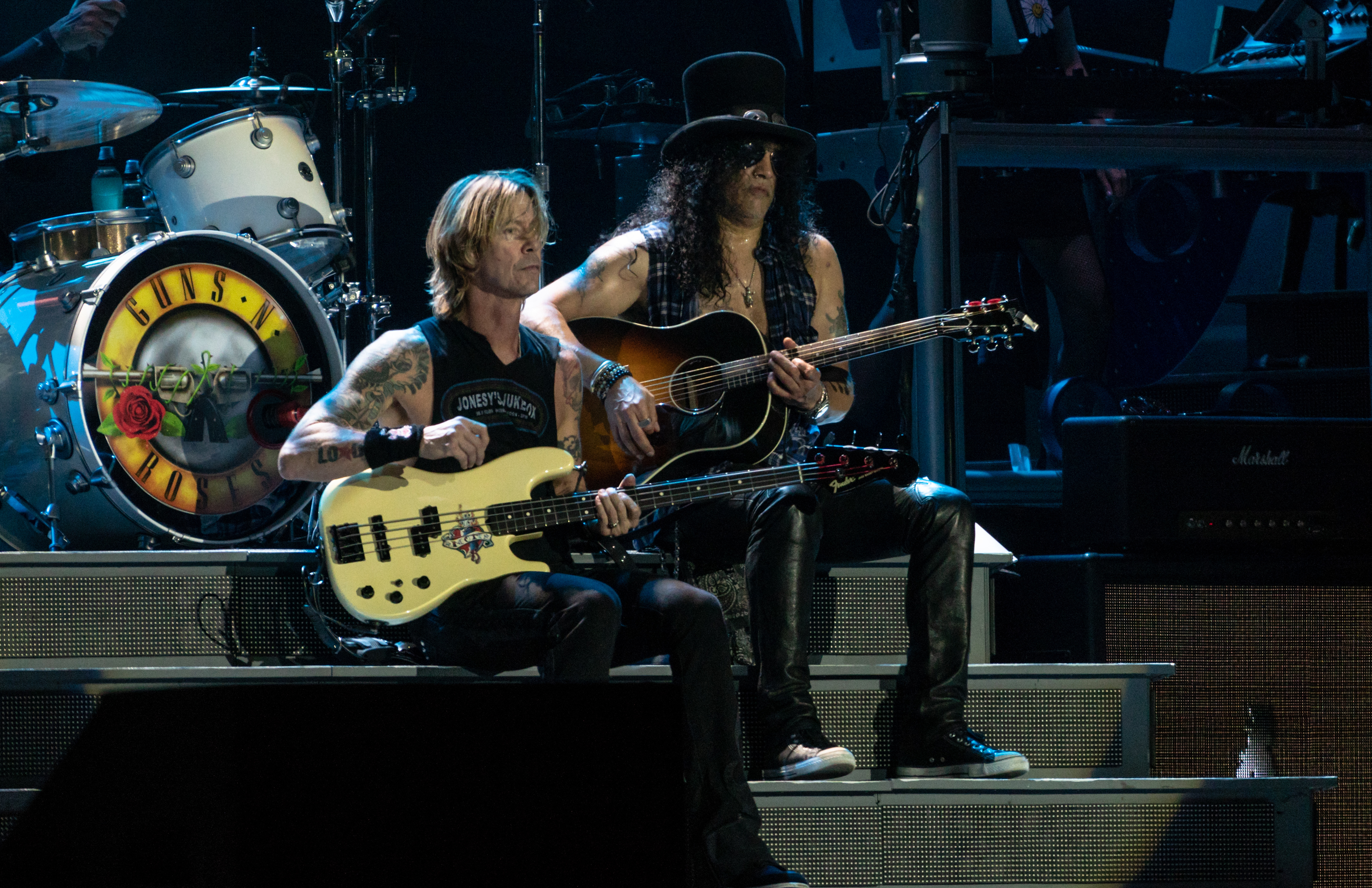
Both bassist Duff McKagan (left) and guitarist Slash (right) returned to the band in 2016.

On July 27, 2015, guitarist DJ Ashba left the band, citing his commitments to his family and his other band, Sixx:A.M. Ashba released a statement saying "I have reached a point in my life where I feel it's time to dedicate myself to my band Sixx:A.M., my adoring wife and family, and to the many new adventures that the future holds for me." Several days later, music journalist Gary Graff reported that a "confirmed source within the band" had told him that Ron Thal had left the band after the 2014 tour. No official announcement from Thal or the band was made. Tommy Stinson then left the band, citing personal reasons making him unavailable to tour.

On December 29, 2015, several days after a Guns N' Roses-related teaser was released to movie theaters, Billboard reported that Slash was set to rejoin the band and a "reunited" lineup will headline Coachella 2016. Rose was set to appear on Jimmy Kimmel Live! the following week to talk about the future of the band, but his appearance was cancelled due to "unforeseen circumstances". Guns N' Roses was officially announced as the headliner of Coachella on January 4, 2016, with KROQ reporting Slash and Duff McKagan were rejoining the band. The Coachella festival confirmed via press release that McKagan and Slash were rejoining.

==== Not in This Lifetime... Tour ====
On March 25, 2016, the band announced the Not in This Lifetime... Tour. The tour's name was a reference to a 2012 interview in which Rose, when asked about when a potential reunion would happen, responded "not in this lifetime". A previously unannounced warmup gig at the Troubadour in Los Angeles took place on April 1, 2016. Melissa Reese replaced Chris Pitman as the second keyboardist after Pitman quit. (Note: Reese was recommended to the band by former drummer Brain, who had collaborated with her on several projects.) During the show at the Troubadour, Rose fell off a monitor and broke his foot. Rose was given Dave Grohl's customized throne that Grohl had used to perform when he broke his leg at a concert.

The band's first scheduled concerts with Slash and McKagan took place at the newly opened T-Mobile Arena on April 8 and 9, 2016. At the performance at the first weekend of Coachella, AC/DC guitarist Angus Young joined the band on stage. The appearance came as AC/DC announced that Rose would take over vocals for the rest of its Rock or Bust tour, replacing Brian Johnson, who had been advised by doctors to stop touring or risk total hearing loss. Rose fronted AC/DC on its European dates in May and June before returning to Guns N' Roses for the North American stadium leg, and AC/DC said its ten postponed U.S. shows would be rescheduled with him as well. During the band's show of July 6, 2016, in Cincinnati, former drummer Steven Adler joined the band on drums for "Out ta Get Me" and "My Michelle". It was the first time since 1990 that Adler performed with the group. (Note: Adler was originally going to take part in the April 1 show at the Troubadour, but had to pull out after having back surgery.) Adler would later join the band at shows in Nashville, Los Angeles, and Buenos Aires. The tour featured additional guest performers, including Sebastian Bach, more appearances by Angus Young, Angry Anderson, P!nk, Billy Gibbons and Dave Grohl.

In November 2017, Guns N' Roses was announced as the headline act at the UK Download Festival in June 2018. In addition, they won Top Tour/Top Draw at the 2017 Billboard Touring Awards. They were nominated for Top Touring artist and Top Rock Tour, as well as Top Duo/Group at the 2017 Billboard Music Awards. The next year, they were nominated again for Top Rock Tour and Top Touring artist. They also headlined the 2018 Graspop Metal Meeting, alongside Iron Maiden and Marilyn Manson.

The tour was a financial success, grossing over $480 million by December 2017 and at that time was listed as the fourth highest-grossing concert tour of all-time. The 2016 North American stadium leg, which ran from June 23 to August 22 and played 21 stadiums, grossed $116.8 million. A two-night stand at London Stadium in June 2017 grossed $17.6 million from 140,877 tickets, the tour's highest-grossing engagement as of late 2017. The tour ended on December 8, 2018, at Aloha Stadium in Honolulu, after 159 shows in 41 countries. It had grossed $563.3 million, making it the then second-highest-grossing tour, behind U2's U2 360° Tour. (Note: Ed Sheeran's ÷ Tour passed the tour gross the following year, bumping the Not in This Lifetime... Tour to third.)

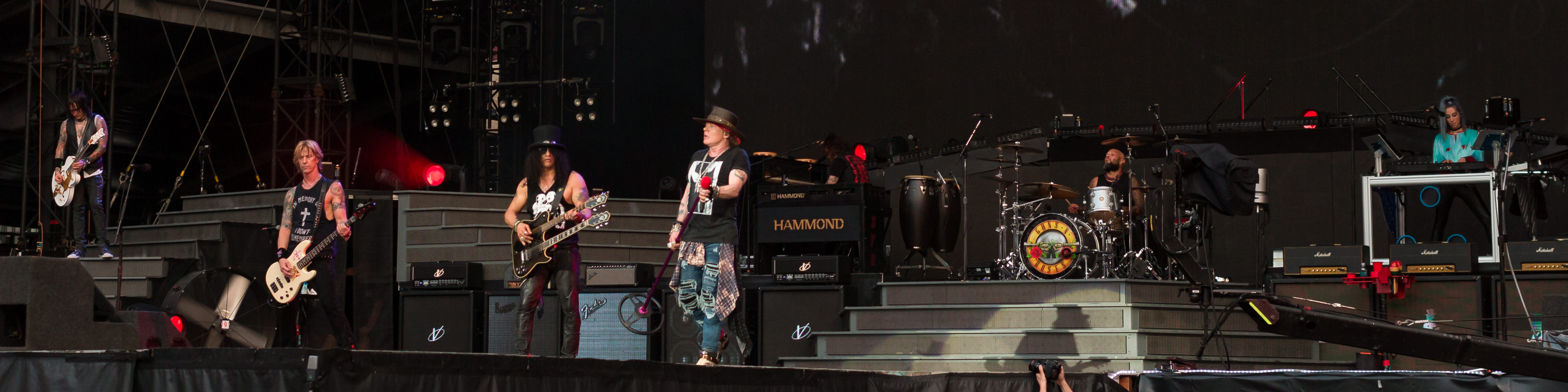
Guns N' Roses playing in London in 2017. From left to right, Richard Fortus, Duff McKagan, Slash, Axl Rose, Dizzy Reed, Frank Ferrer, Melissa Reese

==== Appetite for Destruction deluxe edition ====
On April 30, 2018, billboards in several large cities, as well as a website (GNR.FM), were spotted with the tagline "Destruction Is Coming". The website was updated with a countdown clock to May 4, 2018, and a snippet of the song "Shadow of Your Love" playing. Journalist Mitch Lafon stated the campaign was for a deluxe edition of Appetite for Destruction. A video announcement was inadvertently released a day early, detailing the "Appetite for Destruction: Locked N' Loaded" edition. The boxed set includes 73 songs on four CDs (49 of which were previously unreleased), seven 12-inch 180-gram LPs, remastered versions of Appetite, an EP of B-sides, a 96-page book with unreleased photos, 12 lithographs, and assorted replica memorabilia. "Shadow of Your Love" was released as a single on May 4, 2018, the band's first single in almost a decade. To promote the release, a previously unseen music video for "It's So Easy" was released on Apple Music, as well as several promotional singles. (Note: "Welcome to the Jungle (1986 Sound City Session)", "Move to the City (1988 Acoustic Version)" and "November Rain (Piano Version, 1986 Sound City Session)".) The box set was released on June 29, 2018, to universal critical acclaim.

==== New recordings and touring ====
Rose discussed Slash and McKagan rejoining in a June 2016 interview, stating "It was always looked at as a possibility, but it never seemed right or felt right". He also reiterated his intention to release new Guns N' Roses music. Slash later told Aerosmith's Joey Kramer in an interview with WZLX that "We all were pretty positive (the reunion) would never happen, so it's still sort of blowing our minds. ... But everybody's really getting along great and I think everybody's come a long way, and it's all cool." Various members have discussed plans for a new album since 2017.

A North American stadium tour and several festival dates were announced in 2020, billed as a new tour rather than a continuation of the Not in This Lifetime... Tour. The 2020 dates were cancelled after a March festival appearance in Mexico City because of the COVID-19 pandemic, and the band rescheduled a reduced run of 13 North American dates for summer 2021. Greatest Hits was reissued in September 2020 with "Shadow of Your Love" added, including its first vinyl pressing. In June 2021, the band expanded the rescheduled run with 14 additional shows, with Wolfgang Van Halen's Mammoth WVH as support. The We're F'n' Back Tour played the United States from July to October and was later extended into 2022 with legs in Europe, Latin America, and Oceania.

"Absurd", which the group debuted onstage at Fenway Park a few days earlier, was released as a single on August 6, 2021, its first new material since 2008. "Hard Skool" followed on September 24, and both singles are reworkings of songs from the Chinese Democracy sessions. A physical release of "Hard Skool" was announced as both an EP and a vinyl single with different track listings; the EP, featuring "Absurd" and live tracks, came out on February 25, 2022. Slash said later in 2021 that the group had been reworking Chinese-era songs for future release, and in 2022 he confirmed that more new songs were in the works, saying "There's new Guns material coming out as we speak, and we'll probably keep putting it out until the entire record's worth of stuff is done".

A remastered deluxe box set of the two Illusion albums, Use Your Illusion (Super Deluxe Edition), was announced on September 20, 2022, and released on November 11. It includes both albums remastered, two live concerts from 1991 (New York) and 1992 (Las Vegas), a Blu-ray of the New York concert, and photographs and memorabilia. A live version of "You Could Be Mine" served as the lead single.

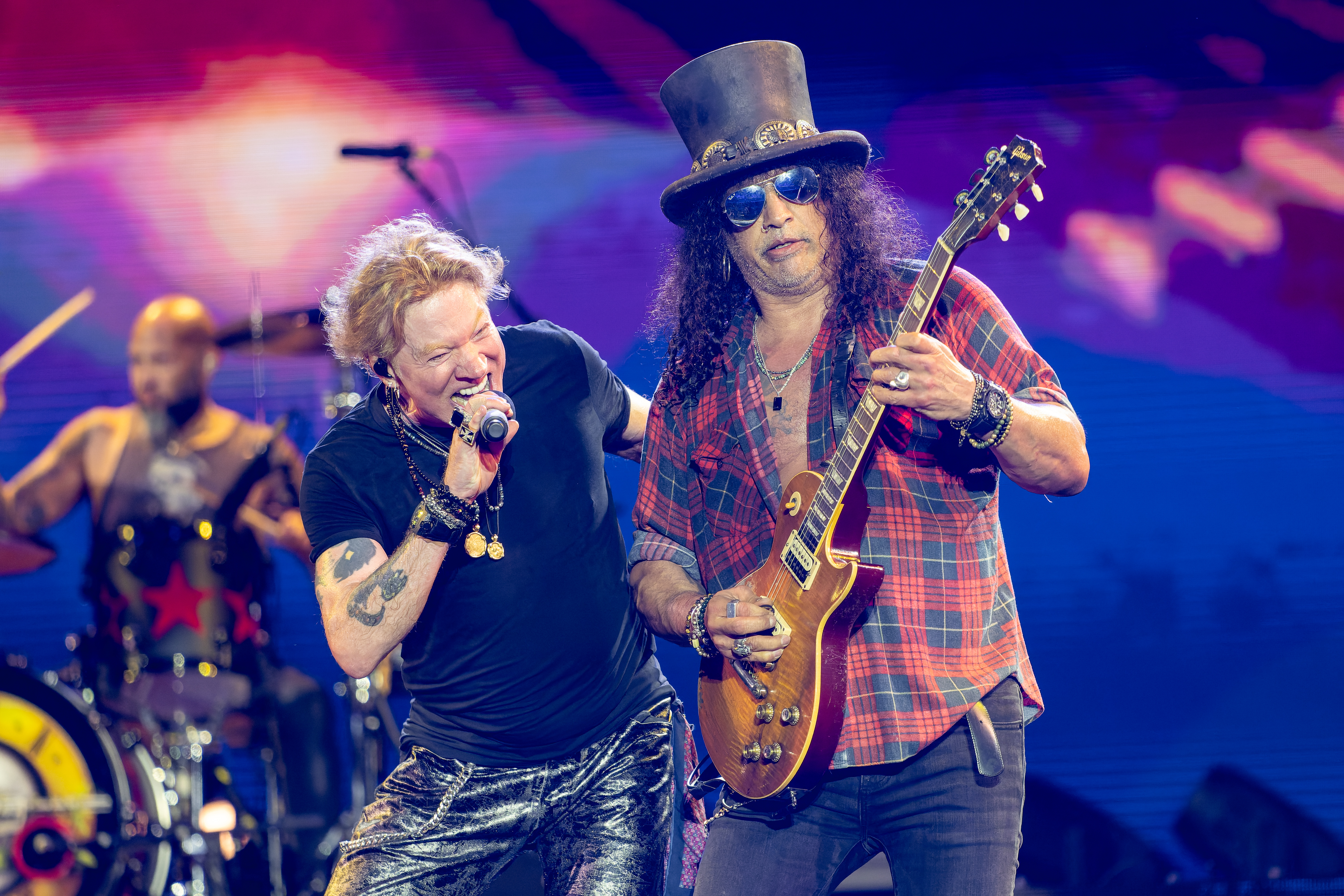
Guns N' Roses performing at Glastonbury 2023.

The Guns N' Roses 2023 Tour included the group's first headlining set at Glastonbury Festival, on June 24. It drew mixed reviews, with some publications calling it one of the worst headlining sets in festival history, and the group responded by claiming that technical difficulties had resulted in a poor mix. The piano-driven single "Perhaps" followed on August 18, 2023, with its "R-side" "The General" released digitally and on vinyl on December 8.

==== Lineup changes and 2026 world tour ====
The "Because What You Want & What You Get Are Two Completely Different Things Tour" was announced in December 2024. Its 2025 dates took the group through Europe, the Middle East, Asia, and Latin America, including stops in Düsseldorf, Riyadh, and Mumbai.

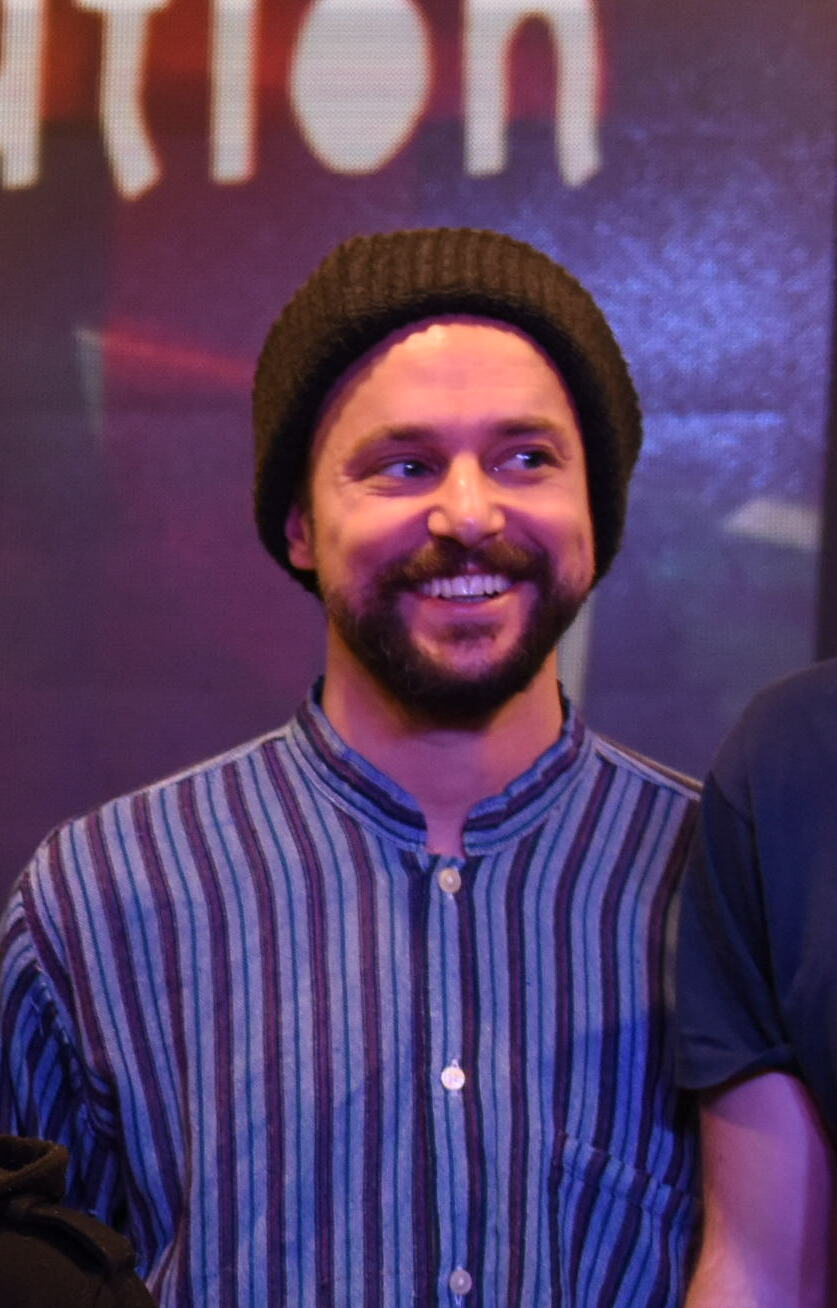
Drummer Isaac Carpenter joined the band in 2025.

Longtime drummer Frank Ferrer, who had joined in 2006, left on March 19, 2025. Isaac Carpenter was announced as his replacement the next day. (Note: Carpenter had previously performed with McKagan in Loaded.) Carpenter made his live debut with the group on May 1.

On July 5, 2025, the group played several Black Sabbath covers at Black Sabbath's farewell concert, Back to the Beginning. A remastered Live Era '87–'93 was announced in October and released on vinyl on November 21.

On November 24, 2025, GNR announced a 2026 world tour alongside two new songs, "Nothin'" and "Atlas", originally scheduled for release on December 2. The songs were released on December 4. Like the group's other post-reunion singles, both date to the Chinese Democracy sessions and feature new parts from Slash and McKagan. In early 2026, Slash and McKagan both mentioned the band finished releasing reworked songs and the plan was to release them as a package at some point, with Slash saying, "the next record that we're gonna do is gonna be all new original stuff and that'll be an actual album."

On March 27, 2026, the day before the tour began, the group announced that Melissa Reese would not be joining it "due to unforeseen personal reasons". No replacement was named.

The tour opened on March 28 at the Tecate Pa'l Norte festival in Monterrey, Mexico, where "Nothin'" and "Atlas" received their first live performances. It continued with a Brazil leg in April and dates across Europe, before a North American stadium run opened on July 23 at Carter-Finley Stadium in Raleigh, North Carolina, with support from acts including the Black Crowes, Public Enemy, and Ice Cube. As of October 2026, the tour is scheduled to continue through Asia and Oceania, with dates in India, Indonesia, Singapore, Australia, and New Zealand ending on December 17.

== Legacy, style and controversies ==
=== Legacy ===
Guns N' Roses signed with Geffen Records in 1986. Their debut album, Appetite for Destruction, released in July 1987, debuted at number 182 on the Billboard 200 and reached number one on August 6, 1988, after incessant touring and MTV airplay of "Sweet Child o' Mine" and "Paradise City"; it then spent 52 consecutive weeks in the top ten. The album was certified 18× platinum by the RIAA in September 2008, making it the best-selling debut album in the United States until Cracked Rear View by Hootie & the Blowfish surpassed it in 2018. It has sold more than 30 million copies worldwide. Apple Music said "Despite only releasing four album's [sic] worth of original material in their original incarnation, GNR had burned so brightly in such a short time that their legend remains stubbornly intact".

Appetite for Destruction is credited with "(changing) hard rock's sensibilities at the time", and bringing a "danger, attitude and legitimacy" to rock, leading to a decline in the late-'80s glam metal craze. The band has also been credited with helping re-popularize power ballads in heavy metal music.

Guns were five dudes with this shared vision. We met and it was the exact five right guys… The moment we got in a room and played the first three chords, we all knew it. We didn't have illusions that we were going to be huge or anything. But people started coming to our gigs and then labels started coming to our gigs and we made the record we wanted to make. And, all of a sudden, it hit, and it seems like a whole generation of the world had an affinity for that record.

— Duff McKagan

==== Rankings and honors ====
Appetite for Destruction was ranked 62nd on Rolling Stone's 2012 list of "The 500 Greatest Albums of All Time". In 2004, Rolling Stone ranked the band No. 92 on its list of the "100 Greatest Artists of All Time". The television network VH1 ranked Guns N' Roses ninth in its "100 Greatest Artists of Hard Rock" special, and 32nd on its "100 Greatest Artists of All Time". In 2002, Q named the band in its list of the "50 Bands to See Before You Die". "Paradise City" was voted ninth-best hard rock song out of 100 candidates by VH1.

Individual members have also been ranked highly. Rolling Stone placed Rose 64th on its 2008 list of the 100 greatest singers, while Time named Slash runner-up to Jimi Hendrix on its 2009 list of the ten greatest electric guitar players and Rolling Stone ranked him 65th among the 100 greatest guitarists in 2011. McKagan was included on MusicRadar's 2017 list of the 50 best bassists of all time, and Stradlin appeared on Ultimate Guitar's lists of the best rhythm guitarists, while Adler was ranked 98th on Rolling Stone's list of the greatest drummers. Later members were also ranked among the best in their field: keyboardist Dizzy Reed ranked among the greatest rock pianists by IRockU, drummer Matt Sorum ranked among the best rock drummers by Drum!, guitarist Buckethead was ranked among the fastest and most innovative contemporary guitarists by publications such as AllMusic and Guitar World, and studio drummer Josh Freese ranked among the top 10 rock drummers by Gibson.

The band won the American Music Awards for favorite heavy metal/hard rock artist and album (Appetite for Destruction) in January 1990, and won favorite heavy metal/hard rock artist again in January 1992. "Sweet Child o' Mine" won the MTV Video Music Awards for Best Heavy Metal Video in 1989, and at the 1992 ceremony the band received the Video Vanguard Award and "November Rain" won for Best Cinematography. The band has received Grammy Award nominations but has not won one; in March 2024, Appetite for Destruction was announced as one of ten recordings inducted into the Grammy Hall of Fame.

Guns N' Roses was inducted into the Rock and Roll Hall of Fame on April 14, 2012, in its first year of eligibility, with Green Day presenting the induction. The group is one of the world's best-selling bands of all time, having sold more than 100 million records worldwide, including shipments of 45 million in the United States. The Not in This Lifetime... Tour (2016–2019) grossed $584.2 million from more than 5.3 million tickets, making it the third-highest-grossing tour in Billboard Boxscore history when it ended. The video for "Sweet Child o' Mine" was the first from the 1980s to reach one billion YouTube views, in October 2019, and "November Rain" was the first from the 1990s to do so, in 2018.

=== Musical style ===
Early Guns N' Roses music was a fusion of punk rock, blues rock, hard rock, heavy metal, and glam metal. (Note: Musical styles: "punk rock"; "blues rock"; "heavy metal"; "hard rock"; "hair metal") The Rock and Roll Hall of Fame describes the band as combining a reverence for classic rock acts with the abrasiveness of metal and the anti-authoritarianism of punk, rising from the Sunset Strip scene of the 1980s. The Illusion albums saw the band branching out into art rock and incorporating influences from progressive rock, folk rock, progressive metal, speed metal, funk metal, and industrial music. "The Spaghetti Incident?" saw the group cover mostly punk rock songs. Since its 1999 revival, the band has retained hard rock and piano rock features while including elements of industrial rock, electronic rock, nu metal, industrial metal and trip hop. (Note: Musical styles: "industrial rock"; "electronic rock"; "industrial metal"; "nu metal"; "trip hop") In the 1990s, the band integrated keyboards (played by either Rose or Reed) into its sound. Teddy Andreadis was brought in as an additional keyboardist and harmonica player for the Use Your Illusion Tour, alongside multiple backing vocalists and a brass and woodwind section. Later tours saw keyboardist Chris Pitman (and after 2016, Melissa Reese) contribute sub-bass and synth parts, as well as reproducing the brass and string parts of songs electronically.

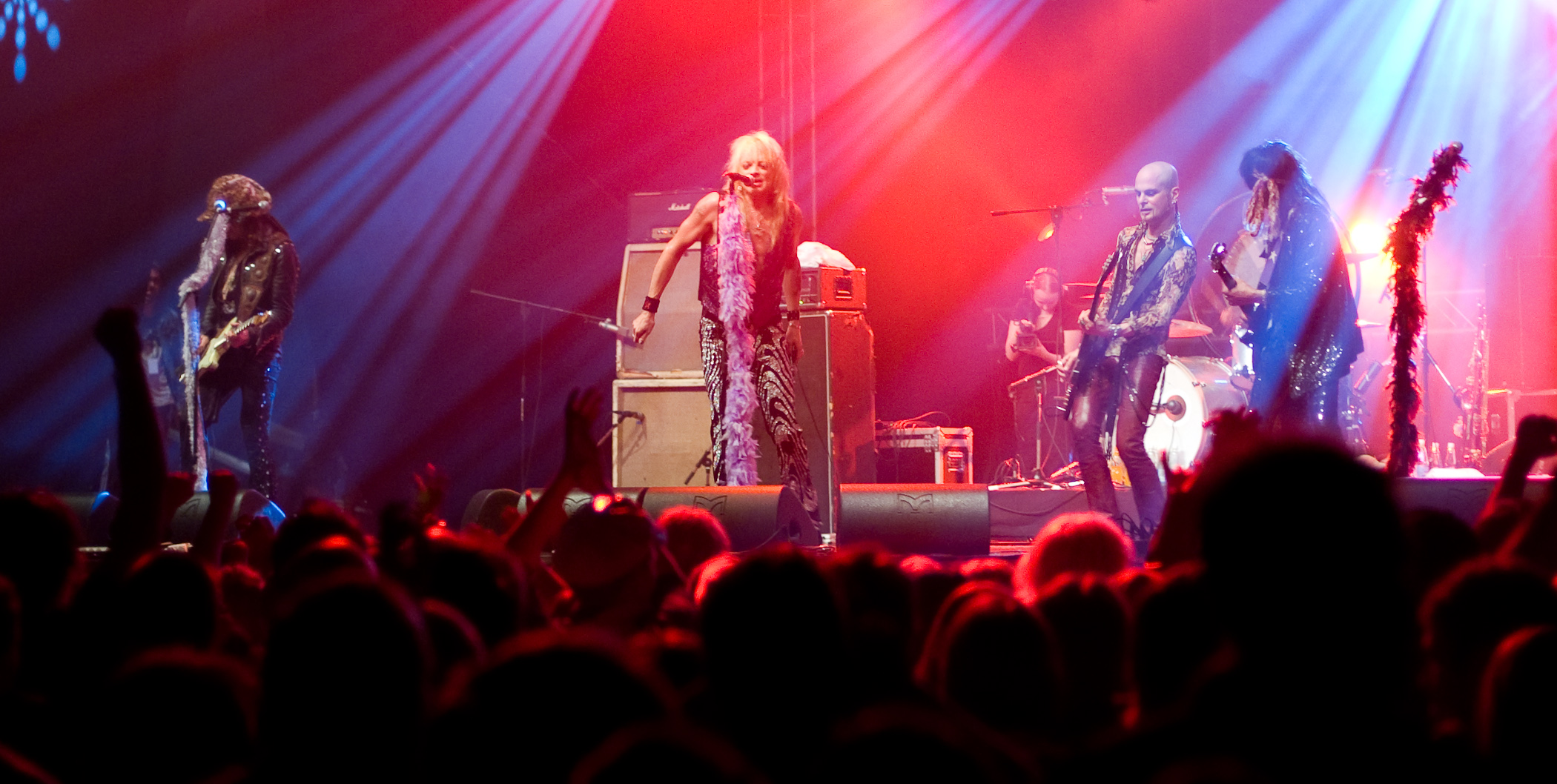
Guns N' Roses' early look and sound was influenced by Finnish band Hanoi Rocks.

The Finnish band Hanoi Rocks heavily influenced both the image and sound of Guns N' Roses; singer Michael Monroe and Rose have collaborated on several occasions. Rose has stated that the band was massively influenced by groups like Queen, AC/DC, the Rolling Stones, Aerosmith, and Rose Tattoo, and that the sound of Appetite for Destruction was influenced by AC/DC, Led Zeppelin, the Who, Cheap Trick, Aerosmith, Van Halen, the New York Dolls, and Hanoi Rocks. The band was also influenced by Black Sabbath, the Sex Pistols, T. Rex, MC5, and Accept. Rose's orchestral-style songwriting on the Illusion albums was influenced by the Electric Light Orchestra, Elton John, and Queen, particularly their album Queen II. Rose cited the influence of Nirvana's "Smells Like Teen Spirit" in recording the title track of Chinese Democracy. Rose was heavily influenced by the industrial rock sound of Nine Inch Nails, changing the band's sound in the lead up to Chinese Democracy. Critics noted influences of Queen, Elton John, Wings and Andrew Lloyd Webber on some songs on Chinese Democracy.

=== Influence on other artists ===
Several established musicians have praised the band. Joe Perry stated that the band was the first to remind him of Led Zeppelin. Ozzy Osbourne said that the band could have been "the next Rolling Stones" if the classic lineup had stayed together. Tom Petty also favorably compared the band to the Rolling Stones. Country musician Steve Earle told Rolling Stone that "Guns N' Roses are what every L.A. band pretends to be". Kiss bassist Gene Simmons named Appetite for Destruction among his thirteen favorite albums of all time, saying it had an honesty that rock and roll had been missing. Queen guitarist Brian May, who played with the band on its 1993 tour, said he felt a "spiritual connection" between Guns N' Roses and Queen. Gangsta rap group N.W.A., of whom Guns N' Roses were early supporters and befriended, named a song "Appetite for Destruction" after the Guns album of the same name.

Guns n' Roses are still an example of how a band can move rock forward. Sometimes you think, "How can you top anything by the Yardbirds, or Zeppelin, or the Stones?" And then you hear Guns n' Roses, and it's inspiring. You can think that it's all been written, but it hasn't.

— Aerosmith guitarist Joe Perry.

The band has influenced many later rock acts. The Rock and Roll Hall of Fame lists Buckcherry, Avenged Sevenfold, The Darkness, Wolfmother, Greta Van Fleet, The Pretty Reckless, My Chemical Romance and The Strokes among the artists it influenced. Avenged Sevenfold's M. Shadows has called Guns N' Roses his favorite band of all time, saying his father gave him Appetite for Destruction when it came out, and the band immersed itself in the album, along with Metallica's Black Album, before recording Hail to the King. The Welsh band Manic Street Preachers have cited the band as a major influence on their debut album Generation Terrorists: guitarist James Dean Bradfield taught himself guitar by playing along to Appetite for Destruction, and the group covered "It's So Easy" as a B-side to their 1992 single "You Love Us". Queensrÿche vocalist Todd La Torre called Appetite for Destruction "a very influential album for me". Slipknot frontman Corey Taylor has called Guns N' Roses "my Rolling Stones", saying Appetite for Destruction was the one album that his metal, punk, skater and hard rock friends could all agree on. Pantera drummer Vinnie Paul recalled the album's impact on its release as "huge". Other acts reported to have been influenced by the band include Black Label Society, Bullet for My Valentine, Fall Out Boy, Fozzy, Hinder, Shinedown, and Sum 41.

=== In popular culture ===
Guns N' Roses have appeared in popular culture across television, film, and video games. Arrested Development featured a gag in the episode "Sword of Destiny" (2005), where Tony Wonder attempts to name his magic DVD "Use Your Illusion". Slash was lampooned in the South Park episode "Crack Baby Athletic Association", where he is portrayed as a mythical figure named "Vunter Slaush", a Santa Claus-like legend believed by the children. Celebrity Deathmatch staged a fight between Axl Rose and Slash in a music-themed episode. Rose also voiced himself in a 2018 episode of New Looney Tunes, and in 2021 appeared in Scooby-Doo and Guess Who?. Can't Hardly Wait (1998) features a comedic performance of "Paradise City", while Step Brothers (2008) includes the family car singalong of "Sweet Child o' Mine". The U.S. release of the video game Mega Man X5 (2000) renamed its bosses after Guns N' Roses members. The manga series JoJo's Bizarre Adventure part The JoJoLands introduced a Stand named "November Rain" after the Guns N' Roses song. "Welcome to the Jungle", frequently played at sporting events, is considered a sports anthem.

=== Criticism and controversies ===
Guns N' Roses has received criticism throughout the years. The band received criticism for drug and alcohol use in the 1980s and early 1990s. Songs such as "One in a Million" and the band's cover of Charles Manson's "Look at Your Game, Girl" were considerably controversial upon release. In addition, some lyrics have been regarded as sexist. The band has also been criticized for tardiness and starting shows later than advertised. The long periods of time between albums are another source of criticism.

Several fellow musicians were also critical of the band. Nirvana frontman Kurt Cobain stated that his band was "not your typical Guns N' Roses type of band that has absolutely nothing to say" and refused to tour with them. (Note: Nirvana drummer Dave Grohl later explained "I think it represented something bigger. Nirvana didn't want to turn into Guns N' Roses. So Kurt started talking shit in interviews, and then Axl started talking back. It went back and forth like tenth-grade bullshit.") When the band and Living Colour both supported the Rolling Stones at the Los Angeles Coliseum in 1989, Living Colour guitarist Vernon Reid publicly criticized "One in a Million" during his band's set, leading to a public exchange between Reid and Rose. Faith No More, who opened for the band on its 1992 stadium tour, openly mocked Rose in interviews and on stage, and singer Mike Patton later said the band had been treated poorly by Guns N' Roses. Rose also feuded publicly with Mötley Crüe singer Vince Neil following a dispute between Neil and Stradlin. Despite his admiration for Appetite for Destruction, Corey Taylor has said he has no respect for performers who keep fans waiting two to three hours, a criticism he directed at Rose. The band's 1992 co-headlining stadium tour with Metallica was marred by tension; Metallica members criticized Rose's behavior and late performances.

The group's live performances have occasionally ended in violence, most famously the 1991 Riverport Riot in St. Louis, when Rose leapt into the crowd to confront a fan with a camera before shutting down the show. His departure from the stage sparked chaos that injured dozens and caused extensive property damage, leading to lawsuits and Rose's arrest. In October 2009, Ulrich Schnauss's record labels Independiente and Domino sued Guns N' Roses, alleging that the band had committed copyright infringement by using portions of Schnauss's compositions in the track "Riad N' the Bedouins" on the album Chinese Democracy. The band claimed the samples were obtained legitimately. Chinese Democracy was banned in the People's Republic of China, due to criticism in its title track of the Government of the People's Republic of China and reference to the Falun Gong. The Chinese government said through the media that it "turns its spear point on China". In November 2023, former band photographer Katarina Benzova filed a lawsuit alleging that the band had falsely claimed ownership of photographs she took, and that manager Fernando Lebeis had subjected her to repeated unwanted advances over the twelve years she worked for the band.

== Band members ==
Current members

- Axl Rose – lead vocals, piano, keyboards, percussion (1985–present)
- Duff McKagan – bass guitar, backing and occasional lead vocals (1985–1997, 2016–present)
- Slash – lead and rhythm guitar, occasional backing vocals (1985–1996, 2016–present)
- Dizzy Reed – keyboards, piano, backing vocals, percussion (1990–present)
- Richard Fortus – rhythm and lead guitar, backing vocals (2002–present)
- Melissa Reese – synthesizers, keyboards, backing vocals, sub-bass, programming, percussion (2016–present; not touring 2026)
- Isaac Carpenter – drums (2025–present)

== Discography ==
- Appetite for Destruction (1987)
- G N' R Lies (1988)
- Use Your Illusion I (1991)
- Use Your Illusion II (1991)
- "The Spaghetti Incident?" (1993)
- Chinese Democracy (2008)

== Tours ==
- The Early Days of Guns N' Roses (1985–1987)
- Appetite for Destruction Tour (1987–1988)
- Use Your Illusion Tour (1991–1993)
- Chinese Democracy Tour (2001–2011)
- Up Close and Personal Tour (2012)
- Appetite for Democracy (2012–2014)
- Not in This Lifetime... Tour (2016–2019)
- We're F'N' Back! Tour (2021–2022)
- 2023 Tour (2023)
- Because What You Want & What You Get Are Two Completely Different Things Tour (2025)
- 2026 Tour (2026)

== Awards and nominations ==
American Music Awards

- 1989: Favorite Pop/Rock Single – "Sweet Child o' Mine"
- 1990: Favorite Heavy Metal/Hard Rock Artist
- 1990: Favorite Heavy Metal/Hard Rock Album – Appetite for Destruction
- 1992: Favorite Heavy Metal/Hard Rock Artist

Billboard Touring Awards

- 2017: Top Tour – "Not in This Lifetime... Tour"
- 2017: Top Draw – "Not in This Lifetime... Tour"

Grammy Hall of Fame

- 2024: Appetite for Destruction inducted

MTV Video Music Awards

- 1988: Best New Artist in a Video – "Welcome to the Jungle"
- 1989: Best Heavy Metal Video – "Sweet Child o' Mine"
- 1992: Michael Jackson Video Vanguard Award
- 1992: Best Cinematography in a Video – "November Rain"

Rock and Roll Hall of Fame

- 2012: Inducted as performers

Revolver Golden Gods

- 2014: Ronnie James Dio Lifetime Achievement Award – Axl Rose

World Music Awards

- 1993: World's Best-Selling Hard Rock Artist of the Year
- 1993: World's Best Group

== Bibliography ==
- Adler, Steven; Spagnola, Lawrence J. (2010). My Appetite for Destruction: Sex, and Drugs, and Guns N' Roses. It Books. ISBN 978-0-06-191711-0.
- Berelian, Essi (2005). The Rough Guide to Heavy Metal. Rough Guides. ISBN 978-1-84353-415-0.
- Canter, Marc (2007). Reckless Road: Guns N' Roses and the Making of Appetite for Destruction. RecklessRoad.com. ISBN 978-0-9793418-7-8.
- Cue, Raz (2015). The Days of Guns, & Raz's. Luck University Press. ISBN 978-0982710319.
- John, Robert (1993). Guns N' Roses: The Photographic History. Bulfinch Press. ISBN 978-0-316-46695-0.
- McKagan, Duff (2011). It's So Easy (And Other Lies). Touchstone. ISBN 978-1-4516-0663-8.
- McKagan, Duff; Kornelis, Chris (2015). How to Be a Man: (and other illusions). Da Capo Press. ISBN 978-0-306-82387-9.
- Phillips, William; Cogan, Brian (2009). Encyclopedia of Heavy Metal Music. Greenwood Press. ISBN 978-0-313-34800-6.
- Popoff, Martin (2000). 20th Century Rock and Roll: Heavy Metal. Collectors Guide Publishing Inc. ISBN 978-1-896522-47-0.
- Slash; Bozza, Anthony (2007). Slash. HarperEntertainment. ISBN 978-0-06-135142-6.
- Stenning, Paul (2005). The Band That Time Forgot: The Complete Unauthorised Biography of Guns N' Roses. Chrome Dreams. ISBN 978-1-84240-314-3.
- Sugerman, Danny (1991). Appetite for Destruction: The Days of Guns N' Roses. St. Martin's Press. ISBN 978-0-312-07634-4.
- Wall, Mick (1992). Guns N' Roses: The Most Dangerous Band in the World. Hyperion Press. ISBN 978-1-56282-951-3.
- Wall, Mick (2008). W.A.R.: The Unauthorized Biography of William Axl Rose. St. Martin's Press. ISBN 978-0-312-37767-0.
