= Thanatiphoro Anthologio =

Greatest hits album by Rotting Christ
- Released: November 6, 2007
- Recorded: 1989–2007
- Genre: Black metal Gothic metal
- Length: 109:44
- Label: Century Media

Rotting Christ chronology
| Theogonia (2007) | Thanatiphoro Anthologio (2007) | Aealo (2010) |

Thanatiphoro Anthologio ("Deadly Anthology" in Greek) is a compilation album by Greek extreme metal band Rotting Christ. The album was released by Century Media on November 6, 2007, and features two discs of fan favorites, demo rarities, archived photos, and an in depth article of praise from AnneMarie Bowman of Metal Maniacs magazine.

== Track listing ==
Disc one
| No. | Title | Length |
|---|---|---|
| 1. | "The Nereid of Esgalduin" (from Satanas Tedeum, 1989) | 3:39 |
| 2. | "The Mystical Meeting" (from Passage to Arcturo, 1991) | 4:34 |
| 3. | "Fgmenth, Thy Gift" (from Ade's Winds, 1992) | 4:49 |
| 4. | "The Fourth Knight of Revelation" (from Ade's Winds, 1992) | 6:37 |
| 5. | "The Sign of Evil Existence" (from Thy Mighty Contract, 1993) | 1:58 |
| 6. | "Non Serviam" (from Non Serviam, 1994) | 5:11 |
| 7. | "King of a Stellar War" (from Triarchy of the Lost Lovers, 1996) | 6:15 |
| 8. | "Archon" (from Triarchy of the Lost Lovers, 1996) | 4:08 |
| 9. | "Shadows Follow" (from Triarchy of the Lost Lovers, 1996) | 4:33 |
| 10. | "Sorrowfull Farewell" (from A Dead Poem, 1997) | 4:51 |
| 11. | "Semigod" (from A Dead Poem, 1997) | 4:38 |
| 12. | "Out of Spirits" (from A Dead Poem, 1997) | 4:06 |
| 13. | "Der Perfekte Traum" (from Sleep of the Angels, 1999) | 4:28 |
| 14. | "After Dark I Feel" (from Sleep of the Angels, 1999) | 4:51 |

Disc two
| No. | Title | Length |
|---|---|---|
| 1. | "Cold Colours" (from Sleep of the Angels, 1999) | 3:35 |
| 2. | "Thou Art Blind" (from Khronos, 2000) | 2:46 |
| 3. | "You Are I" (from Khronos, 2000) | 3:25 |
| 4. | "In Domine Sathana" (from Genesis, 2002) | 5:14 |
| 5. | "Quintessence" (from Genesis, 2002) | 4:45 |
| 6. | "Under the Name of Legion" (from Genesis, 2002) | 6:28 |
| 7. | "Athanati Este" (from Sanctus Diavolos, 2004) | 5:32 |
| 8. | "You My Cross" (from Sanctus Diavolos, 2004) | 4:20 |
| 9. | "Keravnos Kivernitos" (from Theogonia, 2007) | 4:41 |
| 10. | "Nemecic" (from Theogonia, 2007) | 4:20 |
