= Aealo =

Studio album by Rotting Christ
- Released: 15 February 2010
- Recorded: Lunatech Studios, Katerini, Greece; July – October 2009
- Genre: Melodic black metal
- Length: 50:05
- Label: Season of Mist
- Producer: Sakis Tolis

Rotting Christ chronology
Thanatiphoro Anthologio (2007)	Aealo (2010)	Κατά τον δαίμονα εαυτού (2013)

Professional ratings
Review scores
Source	Rating
AllMusic	3.5/5 stars
Metal Storm	N/A

Aealo is the tenth full-length album by Greek extreme metal band Rotting Christ. It was released on 15 February 2010 via Season of Mist.

Vocalist Sakis Tolis stated that "AEALO is the transcription of the Ancient Greek word 'ΕΑΛΩ' into the Latin alphabet. It means thrashing, catastrophe or destruction, and reflects the musical and lyrical content of the album".

== Track listing ==
All tracks are written by Sakis Tolis, except for "Orders from the Dead" by Diamanda Galás

No.	Title	Length
1.	"Aealo"	3:40
2.	"Eon Ænaos"	3:57
3.	"Δαιμόνων βρῶσις" (Greek for "Demons' food")	4:56
4.	"Noctis Era"	4:49
5.	"Dub-Saĝ-Ta-Ke"	2:57
6.	"Fire, Death and Fear"	4:34
7.	"Nekron Iahes..." (instrumental)	1:08
8.	"...Pir Threontai"	4:48
9.	"Thou Art Lord"	4:51
10.	"Santa Muerte"	5:28
11.	"Orders from the Dead" (Diamanda Galás cover)	8:57

- Track 3's name is transliterated as "Daimóno̱n vró̱sis"

== Personnel ==
Rotting Christ

- Sakis Tolis – vocals, guitars, keyboards
- Giorgos Bokos – guitars
- Andreas Lagios – bass
- Themis Tolis – drums

Additional personnel

- Magus Wampyr Daoloth (Necromantia) – vocals
- A.A. Nemtheanga (Primordial) – vocals
- Diamanda Galás – vocals ("Orders from the Dead")
- Pleiades (the traditional choir from Epirus)
- Daemonia Nymphe
- Dirty Granny Tales
- Androniki
- Akis – tsampouna

Production

- Rotting Christ – arrangement
- Sakis Tolis – production, engineering (keyboards), mixing
- Dimitrios Ntouvras – engineering (vocals and all other instruments), mixing, mastering
