= Hellgods =

Indonesian music band

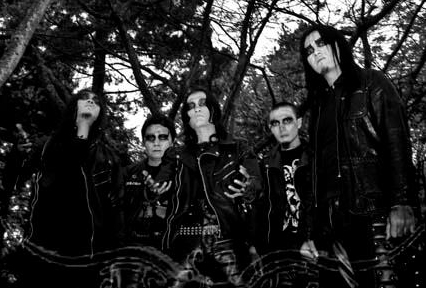

Background information
- Origin: Bandung, Indonesia
- Genres: Black metal
- Years active: 1995–present
- Labels: Nocturmoon Records, Lumiere Records
- Members: Abu Black Ash; YorGad Djevelen; Deadizzia Necrolord; Reyza; Hariz da Grinder
- Past members: Chex Barbarian; Agung Abyssia; Loex Blackstorm; Ade Black Wizard; Hendra; Syam Darkwinter; Jini Putra (JP)
- Website: http://www.hellgods.com/

Hellgods is a black metal band from Bandung, Indonesia. They were one of the earliest bands to play black metal in the country.

== History ==
=== Early formation and debut album ===
Hellgods was formed in September 1995, listing Rotting Christ, Necromantia, Impaled Nazarene & Cradle of Filth among their influences. The early formation involved guitarist / vocalist Abu Black Ash, vocalist Ade Black Wizard, bassist Chex’ Barbarian, guitarist Loex Blackstorm and drummer Agung Abyssia. The band call their music style as extreme violence black metal.

The first record released by the band was the single Satanic Christian in November 1995. Their debut album When The Forest Become My Kingdom was released 1997, followed by single Kabut Keabadian in the same year.

In 1998 the band founder Abu Black Ash quit the band, forcing Chex Barbarian switched his position from bass to guitar and Syam Darkwinter, a new member was recruited to play bass. Another new single Ahl Son Bahr was released in 2000 as one of the track from Neohellist a black metal compilation released by Extreme Souls Production.

In 2002, the band experienced another member changes. Chex Barbarian, Agung Abyssia dan Syam Darkwinter simultaneously quit the band. Abu Black Ash, who quit the band four years earlier, rejoined the band, together with two new members, bass player Deadizzia Necrolord and drummer Hendra Grinder. A new single I Reach... The Eternity was released shortly after the new line-up formed.

In 2003, Hellgods released the single Melebur Jiwa followed by a cover of Sepultura's Troops of Doom for compilation album Sepultribe – A Tribute To Sepultura released by Insane Dreams Productions & Brisik Distro.

=== Long break and change of musical direction ===
Starting from 2003 to 2009, Hellgods was in hiatus due to several personal excuses from the members. Hendra Grinder and Ade Black Wizard quit the band during this period. The band was then reactivated in 2009 with new member drummer Hariz Da Grinder, turning Hellgods into a four members band for the first time after 14 years in five members formation.

A demo called The Blackened Rebirth was made in 2009. The demo marked a musical direction change where the band added elements of industrial metal to their music. This would not last longer as Reyza, a keyboard player, joined the band as a session player in the same year and they changed their style to symphonic black metal.

In 2010, Hellgods experienced another member change when co-founding guitarist Loex Blackstorm left the band. Two session members guitarists, Abah Desecrator and Igor Nazaroth were brought in for temporary replacement, while Reyza was officially appointed as permanent member. In December 2010, Hellgods was billed as opening act for Marduk concert in Jakarta.

In early 2011, a single called Dark Fortress was released. In the same year, a new guitarist Jini Putra or JP joined the band and later that year, they released single Awakening of the Mighty Infernal Gods. In 2012, after a year joining the band, Jini Putra quit the band and was replaced by YorGad Djevelen.

In 2014, Hellgods released a single called Darkness Reborn.

== Band members ==
=== Current members ===
- Abu Black Ash – guitar / vocals (1995–1998, 2002), vocals (2009–present)
- YorGad Djevelen – guitar (2012–present)
- Deadizzia Necrolord – bass (2002–present)
- Reyza – keyboards (2010–present)
- Hariz da Grinder – drums (2009–present)

=== Former members ===
- Chex Barbarian – bass (1995–1998), guitar (1998–2002)
- Agung Abyssia – drum (1995–2002)
- Loex Blackstorm – guitar (1995–2010)
- Ade Black Wizard – vocals (1995–2009)
- Hendra – drum (2002–2004)
- Syam Darkwinter – bass (2000–2002)
- Jini Putra (JP) – guitar (2011–2012)

== Discography ==
Studio albums

- When the Forest Became My Kingdom (1997)

Demos

- The Blackened Rebirth (2010)

Singles

- Satanic Christian (1995)
- Ahl Son Bahr (2000)
- I Reach... The Eternity (2002)
- Melebur Jiwa (2003)
- Dark Fortress (2011)
- Awakening of the Mighty Infernal Gods (2011)
- Darkness Reborn (2014)

Compilations

- Metalik Klikik 1 (1997)
