= Dayal Patterson =

British author

Dayal Patterson is a British author, music journalist and founder of publishing house, Cult Never Dies. He has written several non-fiction books about heavy metal music and has contributed to a number of metal magazines, such as Decibel, Terrorizer, Metal Hammer, Classic Rock Presents, Record Collector, NME, Zero Tolerance and online publications such as The Quietus. His trilogy of books on black metal, Black Metal: Evolution of the Cult, Black Metal: The Cult Never Dies Vol. One. and Black Metal: Into the Abyss, have been labelled 'essential reading' for black metal enthusiasts.

Patterson began his music journalism career in the early 2000s when he started his own fanzine called Crypt. Shortly after, he became a regular contributor for magazines such as Metal Hammer, Terrorizer and Record Collector. During this time, Patterson has written multiple cover stories, including Rammstein, Behemoth, Children of Bodom for Metal Hammer, Deicide and Turisas for Terrorizer and Enslaved for Zero Tolerance Magazine.

In 2013, coinciding with Feral House’s publication of his book, Black Metal: Evolution of the Cult, Patterson founded his own publishing house Cult Never Dies, which specialises in publications, merchandise and physical music releases relating to underground metal.

In late 2023, on Cult Never Dies’ tenth anniversary, Black Metal: Evolution of the Cult - The Restored, Expanded & Definitive Edition was published. The North American version of the book was published in early 2024 by Decibel Books.

Patterson has given talks on the history of metal at events and festivals such as Midgardsblot, Beyond the Gates Cosmic Void, Inferno Festival and Bergen Literary Festival.

Patterson has also written multiple liner notes, and designed album layouts and artwork. He has also done live music and band photography.

== Partial Bibliography ==
Authored Books

- Black Metal: Evolution of the Cult. 2013. Feral House. ISBN 978-1-936239-75-7
- Black Metal: The Cult Never Dies Vol. One. 2015. Cult Never Dies. ISBN 978-0-9933077-0-6
- Black Metal: Into the Abyss. 2016. Cult Never Dies. ISBN 978-0-9933077-1-3
- Owls, Trolls & Dead King's Skulls: The Art Of David Thiérrée. 2017. Cult Never Dies. ISBN 978-0-9933077-3-7
- Non Serviam: The Official Story Of Rotting Christ. 2018. Cult Never Dies. ISBN 978-0-9933077-9-9 / ISBN 978-0-9933077-7-5
- Black Metal: Evolution of the Cult - The Restored, Expanded & Definitive Edition. 2023. Cult Never Dies. ISBN 978-1-915148-66-7

Album liner notes

- Killing Joke – Absolute Dissent. 2010.
- Emperor – The Complete Works. 2017.
- Rotting Christ – Under Our Black Cult. 2018.
- Rotting Christ – Thy Mighty Contract. 2017.
- Rotting Christ – Non Serviam. 2017.
- Rotting Christ – Passage to Arcturo. 2023.
- Cradle of Filth – Cruelty and the Beast: Re-Mistressed. 2019.
