= Unirock Open Air Festival =

Annual heavy metal festival in Istanbul, Turkey

- Genre: Metal
- Locations: Istanbul, Turkey
- Years active: 2008–present
- Founders: Unirock Organisation

Unirock Open Air Festival is an annual summer open-air heavy metal music festival held in Istanbul, Turkey since 2008.

The festival has attracted many international big-name metal bands, such as Testament, Arch Enemy, Opeth, Kreator, Dark Tranquillity, Paradise Lost, and Amon Amarth. Various Middle Eastern and Mediterranean bands have also participated in the event, including Orphaned Land (Israel), Bilocate (Jordan), Arsames (Iran), and Rotting Christ (Greece).

== Unirock Open Air Festival ==
=== 2008 ===
Dates: 20-22 June 2008
Location: Parkorman, Istanbul
Running Order:
20 June 2008: Obstinacy, Definitive, Insistence, Affliction, Catafalque, Opeth
21 June 2008: Unleash, Altona, Crossfire, Malt, Orphaned Land, Mezarkabul, Testament
22 June 2008: Prime Object, Heretic Soul, Black Tooth, False in Truth, Moribund Oblivion, Soul Sacrifice, Dark Tranquillity

=== 2009 ===
==== Warm-up party ====
Dates: 27 March 2009
Location: Bronx, Istanbul
Bands: The Haunted

Dates: 17-19 July 2009
Location: Maçka Küçükçiftlik Park, Istanbul
Running Order:
17 July 2009: And I Exist, Undertakers, Pickpocket, Rampage, Magilum, Soul Sacrifice, Arch Enemy
18 July 2009: Deathblow, UÇK Grind, One Bullet Left, Catafalque, Rotting Christ, Paradise Lost, Kreator
19 July 2009: Mosh Pit Project, Arsames, Bilocate, Saints'N'Sinners, Episode 13, Firewind, Amon Amarth

==== Extreme Open Air Festival ====
Dates: 3 October 2009
Location: Maçka Küçükçiftlik Park, Istanbul
Bands: Biocrime, Carnophage, Moribund Oblivion, Graveworm, Legion of the Damned, Mezarkabul

=== 2010 ===
Dates: 2-4 July 2010
Location: Maçka Küçükçiftlik Park, Istanbul
Running Order:
2 July 2010: Gates of Eternity, Belphegor, Entombed, Behemoth, Overkill, Cannibal Corpse
3 July 2010: None Shall Return, Sabhankra, Sabaton, Necrophagist, Dark Funeral, Grave Digger, Evergrey, Amorphis
4 July 2010: Choler Age, Since Yesterday, Makine, Heaven Shall Burn, Korpiklaani, Obituary, Nevermore

=== 2011 ===
==== Warm-up party ====
Dates: 8 June 2011
Location: Jolly Joker Balans, Istanbul
Bands: August Burns Red

Dates: 9-11 September 2011
Location: Maçka Küçükçiftlik Park, Istanbul
Running Order:
9 September 2011: Baht, Azhirock, Apsent, GROZA, Decapitated
10 September 2011: Dream Ocean, Chopstick Suicide, Nitro, Kimaera, Asafated, Orphaned Land
11 September 2011: 5grs, Gürz, Decaying Purity, Undermost, Ascraeus, Vader, Mayhem
