= Up Close and Personal Tour (Guns N' Roses) =

2012 concert tour by Guns N' Roses

- Tour by Guns N' Roses
- Location: Asia; Europe; North America
- Start date: February 10, 2012
- End date: July 22, 2012
- Legs: 2
- No. of shows: 49

Guns N' Roses concert chronology
- Chinese Democracy Tour (2001–2002; 2006–2007; 2009–2011); Up Close and Personal Tour (2012); Appetite for Democracy (2012–2014)

Up Close and Personal Tour was a 2012 North American and European concert tour by the American hard rock band Guns N' Roses.

== Background ==
On January 20, guitarist Bumblefoot talked about a possible theater tour taking place in February. Guns N' Roses later announced shows in United States.

The shows themselves varied considerably in comparison to the Chinese Democracy Tour. All of the North American shows took place in smaller-scale clubs, rather than a large arena or stadium. All pyrotechnics were removed from the shows.

The European leg of the tour began approximately one month after the band's induction into the Rock and Roll Hall of Fame. The circumstance regarding a new album were unknown, however lead guitarist DJ Ashba stated that the band had many demos recorded, and were planning on discussing 'how they are going to create the best album possible.'

On June 24, guitarist Richard Fortus gave an interview to the French music site, Rock N' Live, in which he revealed that the band would not tour more that year, but would rather go into the studio to work on the next album by the end of the year. "Right now I'm very focused on Guns N' Roses. We are preparing ourselves to return to the studio, so that is why I want to stay focused. That's all that I think by the end of the year."

== Line up ==
The band line-up remained approximately the same since the 2008 release of Chinese Democracy. Co-founder Axl Rose fronted the band, which also included long-term keyboardists Dizzy Reed and Chris Pitman. Newcomer DJ Ashba and Ron "Bumblefoot" Thal were lead guitarists, while the rhythm section consisted of Richard Fortus on rhythm guitar, Tommy Stinson on bass and drummer Frank Ferrer.

== Support acts ==
- Dick Manitoba (February 10)
- Chelsea Smiles (February 12)
- Toilet Böys (February 15)
- Electric Sun (February 19 / February 23)
- Sponge (February 21)
- The Last Vegas (February 24 / February 27)
- Fall of Envy (March 3)
- Bob Lee Rodgers (March 5)
- Falling In Reverse (March 9)
- Goldsboro (March 11 / March 12)
- Thin Lizzy (May 17 – June 1)
- Vengeance and The Panther Queen (May 17)
- Black Spiders (May 19)
- Rival Sons (June 8 / June 22)
- Within Temptation (June 22)
- Sebastian Bach (June 22)
- Killswitch Engage (June 22)
- Black Stone Cherry (June 22)
- Soulfly (June 22)
- Ugly Kid Joe (May 22 / July 3)
- AxeWound (June 22)
- Cancer Bats (June 22)
- No One is Innocent (June 10–19)
- The Cult (June 29)
- The Darkness (July 22)

== Tour dates ==
Date	City	Country	Venue
North America
February 10, 2012	New York City	United States	Roseland Ballroom
February 12, 2012	New York City	United States	Terminal 5
February 15, 2012	New York City	United States	The Ritz Webster Hall
February 16, 2012	New York City	United States	Hiro Ballroom
February 19, 2012	Chicago	United States	House of Blues
February 21, 2012	Detroit	United States	The Fillmore Detroit
February 23, 2012	Silver Spring	United States	The Fillmore Silver Spring
February 24, 2012	Atlantic City	United States	House of Blues
February 27, 2012	Philadelphia	United States	Electric Factory
March 1, 2012	Atlanta	United States	The Tabernacle
March 3, 2012	Orlando	United States	House of Blues
March 5, 2012	Miami	United States	Jackie Gleason Theater
March 9, 2012	Los Angeles	United States	Hollywood Palladium
March 11, 2012	Los Angeles	United States	The Wiltern
March 12, 2012	Los Angeles	United States	House of Blues Los Angeles
Europe
May 11, 2012	Moscow	Russia	Stadium Live Club
May 12, 2012	Moscow	Russia	Stadium Live Club
May 17, 2012	Dublin	Ireland	The O_{2}
May 19, 2012	Nottingham	England	Capital FM Arena
May 20, 2012	Liverpool	England	Echo Arena Liverpool
May 23, 2012	Newcastle	England	Metro Radio Arena
May 25, 2012	Glasgow	Scotland	Scottish Exhibition and Conference Centre
May 26, 2012	Birmingham	England	LG Arena
May 29, 2012	Manchester	England	Manchester Arena
May 31, 2012	London	England	The O_{2} Arena
June 1, 2012	London	England	The O_{2} Arena
June 4, 2012	Rotterdam	Netherlands	Rotterdam Ahoy
June 5, 2012	Paris	France	Palais Omnisports de Paris-Bercy
June 8, 2012	Mönchengladbach	Germany	Warsteiner HockeyPark
June 10, 2012	Lyon	France	Halle Tony Garnier
June 11, 2012	Strasbourg	France	Zénith de Strasbourg
June 14, 2012	Toulouse	France	Zénith de Toulouse
June 16, 2012^{[A]}	Clisson	France	Val de Moine
June 18, 2012	Montpellier	France	Park & Suites Arena
June 19, 2012	Toulon	France	Zénith Oméga de Toulon
June 22, 2012^{[B]}	Milan	Italy	Fieramilano
June 24, 2012^{[C]}	Dessel	Belgium	Festivalpark Stenehei
June 27, 2012	Basel	Switzerland	St. Jakobshalle
June 29, 2012^{[D]}	Graz	Austria	Schwarzl Freizeitzentrum
July 1, 2012^{[E]}	Bucharest	Romania	Romexpo Arena
Middle East
July 3, 2012	Tel Aviv	Israel	Yarkon Park
Europe
July 6, 2012^{[F]}	Istanbul	Turkey	Parkorman
July 8, 2012^{[G]}	Sofia	Bulgaria	Vasil Levski National Stadium
July 11, 2012	Rybnik	Poland	Rybnik Municipal Stadium
July 13, 2012^{[H]}	Piešťany	Slovakia	Piešťany Airport
July 15, 2012^{[I]}	Novi Sad	Serbia	Petrovaradin Fortress
July 17, 2012	Split	Croatia	Spaladium Arena
July 20, 2012^{[J]}	Benicàssim	Spain	Benicàssim Festival Grounds
July 22, 2012	Palma	Spain	Son Fusteret

Festivals and other miscellaneous performances
^{A} This concert was a part of "Hellfest"
^{B} This concert was a part of "Gods of Metal"
^{C} This concert was a part of "Graspop Metal Meeting"
^{D} This concert was a part of "Seerock Festival"
^{E} This concert was a part of "Tuborg GreenFest"
^{F} This concert was a part of "Unirock Open Air Festival"
^{G} This concert was a part of "Sofia Rocks"
^{H} This concert was a part of "Topfest"
^{I} This concert was a part of "Exit Festival"
^{J} This concert was a part of "Festival Internacional de Benicàssim"

=== Box office score data ===
Venue	City	Tickets sold / available	Gross revenue
The O_{2}	London	18,901 / 27,817 (68%)	$1,357,820
Manchester Arena	Manchester	5,877 / 7,205 (82%)	$406,274

== Personnel ==
- Axl Rose – lead vocals, piano, tambourine
- Dizzy Reed – keyboards, piano, percussion, backing vocals
- Tommy Stinson – bass, backing vocals, lead vocals
- DJ Ashba – lead guitar, rhythm guitar, snare drum
- Ron "Bumblefoot" Thal – lead guitar, rhythm guitar, acoustic guitar, backing vocals
- Richard Fortus – rhythm guitar, lead guitar, slide guitar, acoustic guitar, backing vocals
- Chris Pitman – keyboards, synthesizer, samples, programming, tambourine, backing vocals
- Frank Ferrer – drums, tambourine

Additional Musicians

- Izzy Stradlin – rhythm guitar, backing vocals, co-lead vocals on "14 Years" (May 31st-July 22nd, 2012)
