= Apollyon (disambiguation) =

Apollyon (Ἀπολλύων) is the Greek name for Abaddon, the spiritual being (or place) named as the destroyer (or place of destruction), the exterminator, in Christian apocalyptic theology.

Apollyon or Appolyon may also refer to:

== Literature ==
- Apollyon (novel), a novel in the Left Behind sequence, by Tim LaHaye and Jerry B. Jenkins
- Apollyon, a demon appearing in The Pilgrim's Progress by John Bunyan
- Apollyon Pringle, a character in the Harry Potter series

== Comics ==
- Apollyon, an incarnation of the Marvel Comics character Fantomex in the X-Men storyline Here Comes Tomorrow
- Appolyon (CrossGen), a comic book character in the Sigilverse created by CrossGen Entertainment

== Music ==
- Apollyon (musician), a.k.a. Ole Moe, a black metal multi-instrumentalist
- Apollyon, a 1996 album by Thou Art Lord, a Hellenic-Black Metal supergroup

== Video Games ==
- Apollyon, a character in the 2017 game For Honor
- Apollyon, a character in the Afterbirth+ expansion for the 2014 game The Binding of Isaac: Rebirth

== Other ==
- Apollyon, a classification for potentially world-destroying and uncontainable SCP objects in the fictional SCP Foundation universe
