= Thou Art Lord =

Greek metal band

- Origin: Athens, Greece
- Genres: Black metal, death metal
- Years active: 1993–present
- Labels: Unisound Records, Nuclear War Now!
- Members: George Zaharopoulos; Sakis Tolis; Gothmog; El; J. Maelstrom
- Past members: Seth; Akis Kapranos; Themis Tolis

Thou Art Lord are a Greek, Athens-based black metal band, formed in 1993. Over the years, the line-up has consisted of former or current members of Greek extreme metal bands Rotting Christ, Necromantia and Septic Flesh.

== History ==
The band's first release was an EP/split with veteran Belgian black metal group Ancient Rites, an effort which would give the group heavy exposure and lead to a record contract with Unisound. They would release their debut full-length album Eosforos the following year, in 1994. Their second release, Apollyon, would be distributed two years later, followed by departure from Unisound and a six-year hiatus.

The direction of the band is different from the members' main projects, which have used unpredictable streaks of atmosphere, melodicism and experimentation. On the contrary, Thou Art Lord's musical approach is raw, unrelenting death/black metal, with lyrical themes of "apocryphal worshipism" and "Dionysian-influenced satanic philosophy".

They reconvened in 2002 and released DV8. Their third LP, Orgia Daemonicum, was released in 2005 through the Greek record Label Black Lotus Records. In 2012, the original members, alongside El (Soulskinner) and J. Maelstrom (Ravencult), recorded and released a new song, Three-Headed Hydra. In May, 2013 the band, with their new line-up, released their latest album, The Regal Pulse of Lucifer.

Thou Art Lord are currently signed to the underground label Nuclear War Now! Productions. Furthermore, the band has announced a collaboration with the Greek label Floga Records to re-release their first albums, Eosforos and Apollyon, on vinyl and CD format.

== Band members ==
=== Current members ===
- George Zaharopoulos (a.k.a. Morbid, Magus Wampyr Daoloth) - vocals, bass
- Sakis Tolis (a.k.a. Necromayhem) - vocals, guitar
- Gothmog - vocals
- El - guitars, synth
- Maelstrom - drums

=== Past members ===
- Seth - vocals
- Akis Kapranos - drums
- Themis Tolis - drums

== Discography ==
=== Albums ===
- Eosforos (1994)
- Apollyon (1996)
- DV8 (2002)
- Orgia Daemonicum (2005)
- The Regal Pulse of Lucifer (2013)
