= Rituals (Rotting Christ album) =

Studio album by Rotting Christ
- Released: 12 February 2016
- Recorded: April – August 2015
- Studio: Devasoundz Studios (Athens, Greece)
- Genre: Black metal
- Length: 49:05
- Label: Season of Mist
- Producer: Sakis Tolis

Rotting Christ chronology
Κατά τον δαίμονα εαυτού (2013)	Rituals (2016)	The Heretics (2019)

Rituals is the twelfth full-length album by Greek extreme metal band Rotting Christ. It was released on 12 February 2016, via Season of Mist. The album debuted at number 14 on the Billboard heatseekers album chart and at number 10 on Ifpi Greek charts.

== Track listing ==
All tracks are written by Sakis Tolis, except for "The Four Horsemen" by Aphrodite's Child and "Του θάνατου (Tou Thanatou)" by Nikos Xilouris; the lyrics for "For a Voice Like Thunder" have been taken from a dramatic piece, "King Edward the Fourth", by William Blake. The lyric of "Les Litanies de Satan" is taken directly from Les Fleurs du mal by Charles Baudelaire.

No.	Title	Length
1.	"In Nomine Dei Nostri" (Latin for "In the Name of Our God")	4:57
2.	"זה נגמר (Ze Nigmar)" (Hebrew for "It's Over")	4:43
3.	"Ἐλθὲ κύριε (Elthe Kyrie)" (Greek for "Come Lord")	4:49
4.	"Les Litanies de Satan (Les Fleurs du Mal)" (French for "The Litanies of Satan (The Flowers of Evil)")	3:55
5.	"Ἄπαγε Σατανά (Apage Satana)" (Greek for "Begone, Satan")	3:50
6.	"Του θάνατου (Tou Thanatou)" (Greek for "Of Death")	3:37
7.	"For a Voice like Thunder"	6:11
8.	"Konx om Pax" (Greek for "Watch and do no harm"; Egyptian for "Light rushing out in a single ray")	6:21
9.	"देवदेवं (Devadevam)" (Sanskrit for "God of Gods")	5:18
10.	"The Four Horsemen"	5:24
Total length:		49:05

Digipak edition bonus track
No.	Title	Length
11.	"Lok'tar Ogar" (Warcraft Orcish for "Victory or Death")	4:25
Total length:		53:30

== Personnel ==
=== Rotting Christ ===
- Sakis Tolis – vocals, guitars, bass, keyboards, production, mixing, mastering
- Themis Tolis – drums

=== Additional personnel ===
- Vagelis Karzis – backing vocals
- George Emmanuel – backing vocals, lead guitar (track 3), recording
- Manolis Antzoletakis – backing vocals
- Giorgos Petratos – backing vocals
- Theodoros Aivaliotis – vocals (choir)
- Giannis Stamatakis – vocals (choir)
- Babis Alexandropoulos – vocals (choir)
- George Zacharopoulos – additional vocals (track 1)
- Danai Katsameni – additional vocals (track 3)
- Vorph – additional vocals (track 4)
- Nick Holmes – additional vocals (track 7)
- Kathir – additional vocals (track 9)
- Nikos Veletzas – percussion
- George Anamouroglou – percussion
- Fotis Benardo – percussion
- Alexandros Kalfakis – percussion
- Konstantis Mpistolis – bagpipes (tracks 3, 9)
- Giorgos Nikas – bagpipes (tracks 3, 9)
- Nikola Nikita Jeremić – orchestration (tracks 1, 7)

=== Production ===
- Jens Bogren – mixing, mastering
- Adrien Bousson – layout

== Charts ==
Chart (2016)	Peak position
Belgian Albums (Ultratop Flanders)	75
Belgian Albums (Ultratop Wallonia)	136
US Top Hard Rock Albums (Billboard)	18
US Heatseekers Albums (Billboard)	14
US Independent Albums (Billboard)	48
