= Pro Xristou =

Studio album by Rotting Christ
- Released: 23 May 2024
- Recorded: 2024
- Genre: Melodic black metal
- Length: 55:38
- Label: Season of Mist
- Producer: Sakis Tolis

Rotting Christ chronology
The Heretics (2019)	Pro Xristou (2024)

Pro Xristou is the fourteenth full-length album by Greek black metal band Rotting Christ. It was released on 23 May 2024 via Season of Mist.

== Track listing ==
All tracks are written by Sakis Tolis.

Pro Xristou track listing
No.	Title	Length
1.	"Προ Χριστού" (Greek for "Before Christ")	1:27
2.	"The Apostate"	5:01
3.	"Like Father, Like Son"	4:35
4.	"The Sixth Day"	3:56
5.	"La Lettera Del Diavolo" (Italian for "The Devil's Letter")	4:01
6.	"The Farewell"	6:15
7.	"Πυξ Λαξ Δaξ" (Classical Greek phrase meaning "With fists, kicks, and bites")	4:33
8.	"Pretty World, Pretty Dies"	4:51
9.	"ᛦᚵᛑᚱᛆᛋᛁᛚ" (Runes for "Yggdrasil")	5:04
10.	"Saoirse" (Irish for "Freedom")	6:17
Total length:		46:00

Limited edition bonus tracks
No.	Title	Length
11.	"Primal Resurrection"	5:33
12.	"All For One"	3:37
Total length:		55:10

== Charts ==
Chart performance for Pro Xristou
Chart (2024)	Peak position
Austrian Albums (Ö3 Austria)	9
German Albums (Offizielle Top 100)	35
Swiss Albums (Schweizer Hitparade)	15
UK Album Downloads (Official Charts)	43
UK Rock & Metal Albums (Official Charts)	25
