= Kata Ton Daimona Eaytoy =

Κατά τον δαίμονα εαυτού

Studio album by Rotting Christ
- Released: 1 March 2013
- Recorded: July–October 2012
- Genre: Black metal
- Length: 55:59
- Label: Season of Mist
- Producer: Sakis Tolis

Rotting Christ chronology
Aealo (2010)	Κατά τον δαίμονα εαυτού (2013)	Rituals (2016)

Professional ratings
Review scores
Source	Rating
Decibel Magazine	7/10 stars
MetalSucks	3.5/5 stars
Thisisnotascene.com	8.5/10 stars

Κατά τον δαίμονα εαυτού (transliterated: Katá ton Daímona Eautoú) is the eleventh full-length album by Greek extreme metal band Rotting Christ.

== Overview ==
The album incorporates diverse instrumentation, including bagpipes and horns, and delves into Incan, Persian, Babylonian, Mayan, Romanian, Slavic, and Greek mythology. Rotting Christ frontman Sakis Tolis considered the album "a journey into the knowledge of ancient civilizations and into the occultism that is rising from the dark side of each one of them". However, Tolis said: "A deep dig into the occult knowledge of the past led me to create this album. I have no special message. I was tired of them. I just want you to make your escape from everyday life and trip with me into the past".

== Title ==
The album title "Κατά τον δαίμονα εαυτού" is Greek. Sakis Tolis contended that the label's understanding of the phrase was "do what thou wilt", a quote associated with Aleister Crowley and Thelema. A more accurate translation is "true to your own spirit".

The same sentence can also be seen on Jim Morrison's tombstone, again in Greek.

== Track listing ==
All tracks are written by Sakis Tolis, except for "Cine iubește și lasă", a traditional Romanian song.

No.	Title	Length
1.	"In Yumen-Xibalba"	6:24
2.	"P'unchaw kachun-Tuta kachun"	4:44
3.	"Grandis Spiritus Diavolos"	5:52
4.	"Κατά τον δαίμονα εαυτού"	4:52
5.	"Cine iubește și lasă"	5:58
6.	"Iwa Voodoo"	4:36
7.	"Gilgameš"	4:02
8.	"Русалка"	4:33
9.	"Ahura Mazdā-Aŋra Mainiuu"	4:44
10.	"χξϛʹ"	5:46

Vinyl/digipak bonus track
No.	Title	Length
11.	"Welcome to Hel"	4:28

- χξϛʹ is how the number 666 is written in Greek numerals;
- Русалка title is transliterated as "Rusalka";
- A sample from the 2000 film Gladiator (the German Leader's line) is used during the beginning of Welcome to Hel.

== Personnel ==
Rotting Christ

- Sakis Tolis – guitars, vocals, bass, keyboards
- Themis Tolis – drums, percussion

Additional personnel

- Georgis Nikas – bagpipes
- Babis Alexandropoulos, Alexandros Loutriotis, Theodoros Aivaliotis, Giannis Stamatakis, Androniki Skoula – choirs
- Eleni Vougioukli – piano (on track 5), vocals (on track 9)
- Suzana Vougioukli – vocals (on tracks 5 and 9)
- George Emmanuel – lead guitar (on track 7)

Miscellaneous staff

- Adrien Bousson – artwork, layout
- Nurgeslag – cover art
- George Emmanuel – engineering
- Jens Bogren – mixing, mastering
- Sakis Tolis – producer, mixing, mastering
