= Ancient Rites =

Belgian black metal band

Background information
- Origin: Diest, Belgium
- Genre: Black metal
- Years active: 1988–present
- Labels: Season of Mist, Massacre
- Members: Gunther Theys; Erik Sprooten; Jory Hogeveen; Patrick Mallo; John Berry
- Past members: Walter van Cortenberg (RIP); Davy Wouters; Bart Vandereycken; Johan; Philip; Stefan; Domingo Smets; Oliver Phillips
- Website: ancientrites.be

Ancient Rites is a Belgian black metal band formed in 1988. The initial lineup consisted of guitar players Johan and Phillip, drummer Stefan, and Gunther Theys on bass and vocals. In 1990, the Dark Ritual demo was released just as black metal was gaining importance in the metal scene. After the demo release, Phillip died in a car crash and Stefan committed suicide. The band continued with Walter van Cortenberg on drums.

Johan left the music scene, and the band replaced him and Phillip in guitar players Pascal and Bart Vandereycken. This line-up released the Evil Prevails EP and several others through various record labels. Pascal left due to his obligations to the Belgian Navy, reducing the band to a trio. In 1994, their first full-length album was released, The Diabolic Serenades. This line-up recorded the band's second album, Blasfemia Eternal. In May 1996, after its release, Bart left the band.

Flemish and non-Flemish musicians joined the band on several tours to support the album. The once Flemish-rooted became an international act with Dutch guitar player Erik Sprooten (ex-Inquisitor) and Finnish guitar player Jan "Örkki" Yrlund (ex-Lacrimosa). Shortly after the release of their third album, Fatherland, keyboard player Domingo Smets (ex-Agathocles) joined. This line-up recorded Dim Carcosa. Smets left the band in 2002 and Davy Wouters (ex-Oblivion, Danse Macabre) replaced him. This line-up can be seen on the live album/DVD And the Hordes Stood as One.

While on tour in support of the live album in May 2003, the band fired Yrlund and brought back Bart. In December 2004, Smets returned and took over as bass player, since Günther wanted to focus on singing. Raf Jansen—who had filled Bart's position for several months in 1996-1997—joined as a third guitar player. They spent most of 2005 was spent writing the album Rubicon, released on 15 May 2006.

Ancient Rites have played with Deicide, Motörhead, Judas Priest, Cradle of Filth, Metallica, Dissection, Morbid Angel, Stormtroopers of Death, Mercyful Fate, Impaled Nazarene, Manowar, Sepultura, Malevolent Creation, Rotting Christ and Slayer.

The band has been accused of being right-wing/nationalist, which they deny.

== Members ==
=== Current members ===
- Gunther Theys – bass (1989–2004, 2014–2021), vocals (1988–present)
- Erik Sprooten – guitars (1996–present)
- Jory Hogeveen – guitars (2019–present)
- Patrick Mallo - bass (2022-present)
- John Berry - drums (2022-present)

=== Past members ===
- Patrick "Wattie" Alfons Cyriel Bloos – bass (1988–1989)
- Philip Bollengier – guitars (1988–1990; his death)
- Stefan Bernar – drums (1989–1990; his death)
- Johan Vrancken – guitars (1989–1990)
- Franky Swinnen – guitars (1991)
- Pascal – guitars (1991–1993)
- Bart Vandereycken – guitars (1991–1996, 2003–2007)
- Raf Jansen – guitars (1996–1997, 2005–2006)
- Jan "Örkki" Yrlund – guitars (1997–2003)
- Domingo Smets – keyboards (1999–2001), bass (2004–2007), guitars (2007–2015)
- Davy Wouters – keyboards (2001–2010, 2011)
- Thomas Cochrane – guitars (2015–2019)
- Walter van Cortenberg – drums (1991–2021, his death)

== Discography ==
=== Albums and EPs ===
- Evil Prevails (EP) – (1992)
- The Diabolic Serenades – (1994)
- Blasfemia Eternal – (1996)
- Fatherland – (1998)
- The First Decade 1989–1999 (compilation) – (1999)
- Dim Carcosa – (2001)
- And the Hordes Stood as One (live) – (2003)
- Rubicon – (2006)
- Laguz – (2015)

=== VHS and DVDs ===
- Scenes of Splendour (VHS) – (2001)
- And the Hordes Stood as One (DVD) – (2003)

=== Miscellaneous releases ===
- Dark Ritual (demo) – (1990)
- Promo 1992 (demo) – (1992)
- Longing for the Ancient Kingdom II / Windows (split with Renaissance) – (1993)
- Thou Art Lord / Ancient Rites (split with Thou Art Lord) – (1993)
- Uncanny / Ancient Rites (split with Uncanny) – (1993)
- Scared by Darkwinds / Longing for the Ancient Kingdom II (split with Enthroned) – (1994)
