= Sleep of the Angels =

Studio album by Rotting Christ
- Released: January 1999
- Recorded: Woodhouse Studios, Hagen, Germany, September 1998
- Genres: Gothic metal; melodic black metal
- Length: 41:06
- Label: Century Media
- Producers: Sakis Tolis; Xy

Rotting Christ chronology
A Dead Poem (1997)	Sleep of the Angels (1999)	Khronos (2000)

Professional ratings
Review scores
Source	Rating
AllMusic	3/5 stars
Chronicles of Chaos	8/10

Sleep of the Angels is the fifth full-length album by Greek extreme metal band Rotting Christ. Like previous releases A Dead Poem and Triarchy of the Lost Lovers, the band refined their direction to a slower style with more emphasis on atmosphere and melodicism than brutality. Despite mixed critical consensus of the album, it would be supported during the band's first-ever tour in the United States.

== Track listing ==
All tracks are written by Sakis Tolis.

No.	Title	Length
1.	"Cold Colours"	3:36
2.	"After Dark I Feel"	4:31
3.	"Victoriatus"	4:01
4.	"Der Perfekte Traum"	4:28
5.	"You My Flesh"	4:35
6.	"The World Made End"	3:00
7.	"Sleep the Sleep of Angels"	4:35
8.	"Delusions"	3:35
9.	"Imaginary Zone"	3:45
10.	"Thine Is the Kingdom"	5:00
Total length:		41:06

U.S. edition bonus track
No.	Title	Length
11.	"Moonlight"	4:17
Total length:		45:23

== Personnel ==
Rotting Christ

- Sakis Tolis – vocals, rhythm guitar, production
- Costas Vasilakopoulos – lead guitar
- Andreas Lagios – bass guitar
- Themis Tolis – drums
- Georgios Tolias – keyboards

Additional personnel

- Waldemar Sorychta – guitar solo ("Victoriatus", "You My Flesh")
- Eddy Kante – vocals ("Der Perfekte Traum")
- Siggi Bemm – mixing, mastering
- Xy – engineering, production
