= Black Metal: Evolution of the Cult =

Book by Dayal Patterson about black metal

Black Metal: Evolution of the Cult - The Restored, Expanded & Definitive Version
- Author: Dayal Patterson
- Cover artist: David Thiérrée
- Language: English
- Genre: Music
- Publisher: Cult Never Dies (UK/EU), Decibel Books (North America)
- Publication place: United Kingdom, United States
- Media type: Print
- Pages: 500 (Cult Never Dies version), 800 (Decibel Books version)
- ISBN: 978-1-915148-66-7
- Preceded by: Black Metal: Evolution of the Cult (Feral House) - out of print

Black Metal: Evolution of the Cult is a book by Dayal Patterson, a British author, music journalist and founder of publishing house, Cult Never Dies. The book was first published in 2013 by Feral House, with a new, updated and expanded version, Black Metal: Evolution of the Cult - The Restored, Expanded & Definitive Version, published in 2023 by Cult Never Dies (and Decibel Books in North America in early 2024).

The book details the evolution of the black metal music genre from its roots, going as far back as the first Black Sabbath album, through proto black metal music from bands such as Hellhammer, the turbulent history of Norwegian black metal to black metal in different countries (such as UK, US, Brazil, Greece, Poland) and its evolution until today.

The 2023 version has 140,000 words of new content, totalling at 340,000. It features over 160 interviews with bands and protagonists of the black metal scene. While the content of the North American version published by Decibel Books is the same as the one published by Cult Never Dies, it varies slightly in size, layout and number of pages. It features interviews with bands such as Venom, Celtic Frost, Mercyful Fate, Behemoth, Rotting Christ, Sigh, Mayhem, Agalloch, Immortal, Destruction, Arcturus.

== Reception ==
The book is often regarded as an important and well-documented account of the genre’s history by the heavy metal press and the artists that made up the genre. A Metal Injection review calls it a “go-to text for insights, interviews and heavily researched, trusted content”, while Record Collector Magazine described it as “a supremely detailed body of work, a true labour of love, and an interesting account of an often misunderstood genre”. Whereas books such as Lords of Chaos sensationalised the controversy around black metal - the church burnings and murders - Patterson’s book focuses on the facts, music and first-hand accounts from the genre’s protagonists.
