= The Heretics (album) =

Studio album by Rotting Christ
- Released: 15 February 2019
- Recorded: 2018
- Studio: Pentagram Studios (Athens, Greece)
- Genre: Melodic black metal
- Length: 43:36
- Label: Season of Mist
- Producer: Sakis Tolis

Rotting Christ chronology
Rituals (2016)	The Heretics (2019)	Pro Xristou (2024)

The Heretics is the thirteenth full-length album by Greek extreme metal band Rotting Christ. It was released on 15 February 2019 via Season of Mist. Loudwire named it one of the 50 best metal albums of 2019.

== Track listing ==
All lyrics are written by Sakis Tolis, except on songs "Πιστεύω", written by Nikos Kazantzakis, and "The Raven", adapted from a poem by Edgar Allan Poe; all music is composed by Sakis Tolis

No.	Title	Length
1.	"In the Name of God"	4:14
2.	"Ветры злые" (Russian for "Evil Winds")	3:13
3.	"Heaven and Hell and Fire"	4:52
4.	"Hallowed Be Thy Name"	5:06
5.	"Dies Irae"	3:46
6.	"Πιστεύω" (Greek for "I Believe")	3:42
7.	"Fire, God and Fear"	4:50
8.	"The Voice of the Universe"	5:23
9.	"The New Messiah"	3:07
10.	"The Raven"	5:23
Total length:		43:36

7-inch vinyl bonus tracks
No.	Title	Length
11.	"The Sons of Hell" (also in digipak edition)	4:18
12.	"Phobos"	4:12
Total length:		52:06

== Personnel ==
=== Rotting Christ ===
- Sakis Tolis – vocals, guitars, bass guitar, keyboards, percussion, production
- Themis Tolis – drums

=== Additional personnel ===
- Stelios Steele – poem narration (track 1, 4, 10)
- Alexis Karametis – vocals (backing) (track 6)
- Stratis Steele – vocals (choirs)
- Alexandros Louziotis – vocals (choirs)
- Giannis Stamatakis – vocals (choirs)
- Theodoros Aivaliotis – vocals (choirs)
- Nikos Velentzas – percussion
- Stamatis Ampatalis – percussion
- Vasilis Koutsouflakis – percussion
- Manos Six – percussion
- Irina Zybina – additional vocals (track 2)
- Dayal Patterson – narration (track 3, 7)
- Melechesh Ashmedi – vocals (track 8)

=== Production ===
- Tony Lindgren – mastering
- Vyacheslav Smishko – artwork
- George Emmanuel – engineering
- Maximos Manolis – cover art
- Jens Bogren – mixing

== Charts ==
Chart (2019)	Peak position
Belgian Albums (Ultratop Flanders)	61
Belgian Albums (Ultratop Wallonia)	157
French Albums (SNEP)	154
German Albums (Offizielle Top 100)	51
Swiss Albums (Schweizer Hitparade)	33
US Heatseekers Albums (Billboard)	13
US Independent Albums (Billboard)	27
