= Theogonia =

Theogonia may refer to:

- Theogony, a poem by Hesiod
- Theogonia (album), a black metal album by Rotting Christ
