= Theogonia (album) =

Studio album by Rotting Christ
- Released: January 22, 2007 (Europe); February 6, 2007 (U.S.)
- Recorded: 2006
- Genre: Melodic black metal
- Length: 42:47
- Label: Season of Mist
- Producer: Sakis Tolis

Rotting Christ chronology
| Sanctus Diavolos (2004) | Theogonia (2007) | Thanatiphoro Anthologio (2007) |

Professional ratings
Review scores
| Source | Rating |
|---|---|
| Allmusic | 4.5/5 stars |

Theogonia (Greek for "Theogony") is the ninth full-length album by Greek extreme metal band Rotting Christ. It is their first release through Season of Mist, and the first to feature guitarist Giorgos Bokos (Nightfall) in the line-up. A music video was also made for the song "Enuma Elish".

In 2007, Theogonia won the Metal Storm award for Best Black Metal Album.

== Track listing ==
1. "Χάος Γένετο (The Sign of Prime Creation)" – 3:20
2. "Keravnos Kivernitos" – 4:41
3. "Nemecic" – 4:16
4. "Enuma Elish" – 4:39
5. "Phobos' Synagogue" – 4:31
6. "Gaia Tellus" – 4:39
7. "Rege Diabolicus" – 2:52
8. "He, the Aethyr" – 4:34
9. "Helios Hyperion" – 3:50
10. "Threnody" – 5:19

== Personnel ==
- Sakis Tolis – vocals, guitar, keyboards
- Giorgos Bokos – guitar
- Andreas Lagios – bass
- Themis Tolis – drums
