= Trysome Eatone =

Studio album by Love Spit Love
- Released: 1997
- Recorded: 1997
- Genre: Alternative rock; post-grunge
- Length: 46:55
- Label: Maverick
- Producer: Ben Grosse, Richard Butler, Richard Fortus

Love Spit Love chronology
Love Spit Love (1994)	Trysome Eatone (1997)

Singles from Album
- 1. "Long Long Time" Released: 1997; 2. "Fall on Tears" Released: 1997

Professional ratings
Review scores
Source	Rating
AllMusic	4/5 stars
Chicago Tribune	1.4/4 stars
Robert Christgau	(dud)
The Encyclopedia of Popular Music	4/5 stars
Entertainment Weekly	B+
MusicHound Rock: The Essential Album Guide	2.5/5 stars

Trysome Eatone is the second and final studio album by the English–American alternative rock band Love Spit Love. It was released in 1997 on Maverick Records.

== Critical reception ==
The Washington Post wrote that "the New York-based quintet employs a sparser, more open sound that even turns jazzy for the album's final track, 'November'." The Hartford Courant called the album "[Richard] Butler's most varied and interesting work in more than a decade." The Los Angeles Times praised the "harder edge that lies closer to post-punk and industrial rock than the atmospheric sonic layers of the Furs style." Phoenix New Times wrote that "there's a sense the aging New Waver is still full of himself, but when [Butler's] glancing, observational lyrics blend with his inherently melancholy vocals, the results make for as poetic an expression as you'll find in the pop-music bins."

== Track listing ==
All songs written by Richard Butler and Richard Fortus, except "It Hurts When I Laugh", co-written by Tim Butler.

1. "Long Long Time" – 4:18
2. "Believe" – 3:52
3. "Well Well Well" – 3:21
4. "Friends" – 4:43
5. "Fall on Tears" – 4:20
6. "Little Fist" – 3:20
7. "It Hurts When I Laugh" – 4:46
8. "7 Years" – 2:56
9. "Sweet Thing" – 3:00
10. "All God's Children" – 4:29
11. "More Than Money" – 3:42
12. "November 5" – 4:08
13. "How Soon Is Now?" (The Smiths cover; bonus) – 4:25

== Personnel ==
Love Spit Love

- Richard Butler – vocals
- Richard Fortus – guitar
- Frank Ferrer – drums
- Chris Wilson – bass guitar

== Charts ==
Chart (1997)	Peak position
US Heatseekers Albums (Billboard)	38
