= Sanctus Diavolos =

Studio album by Rotting Christ
- Released: September 20, 2004
- Recorded: May–June 2004
- Genre: Melodic black metal
- Length: 48:41
- Label: Century Media
- Producer: Sakis Tolis

Rotting Christ chronology
Genesis (2002)	Sanctus Diavolos (2004)	Theogonia (2007)

Professional ratings
Review scores
Source	Rating
Allmusic	3.5/5 stars

Sanctus Diavolos is the eighth full-length album by Greek extreme metal band Rotting Christ.

It is also the first release after the departure of long-time guitarist Kostas and keyboardist George. The album features a guest appearance by Gus G. (Dream Evil, Firewind) on guitar, a live choir, and mainman Sakis Tolis handling synthesizers.

It was recorded at SCA studios in Greece and mixed by Fredrik Nordström (Studio Fredman) in Sweden.

== Track listing ==
All songs written by Sakis Tolis.

1. "Visions of a Blind Order" – 3:46
2. "Thy Wings Thy Horns Thy Sin" – 4:13
3. "Athanati Este" – 5:40
4. "Tyrannical" – 5:07
5. "You My Cross" – 4:19
6. "Sanctimonious" – 3:16
7. "Serve in Heaven" – 3:55
8. "Shades of Evil" – 5:14
9. "Doctrine" – 6:28
10. "Sanctus Diavolos" – 6:41

== Credits ==
- Sakis Tolis – guitars, vocals, keyboards
- Andreas Lagios – bass
- Themis Tolis – drums

=== Guests ===
- Gus G. – solo on track 1
- Christos Antoniou – choir arrangements
