= Scarlet Evil Witching Black =

Studio album by Necromantia
- Released: 1995
- Genre: Black metal
- Length: 47:15
- Label: Osmose Productions

Necromantia chronology
Crossing the Fiery Path (1993)	Scarlet Evil Witching Black (1995)	From the Past We Summon Thee (1997)

Professional ratings
Review scores
Source	Rating
Allmusic	3/5 stars

Scarlet Evil Witching Black is the second album by the Greek black metal band Necromantia. It was released in 1995 on Osmose Productions and in 2002 it was re-issued as part of the Cults of the Shadow double CD. In 2006 the album was re-issued with a bonus track by Black Lotus records as part of a boxed set titled Necromantia containing the three full lengths and the Ancient Pride EP.

== Track listing ==
1. "Devilskin" – 5:50
2. "Black Mirror" – 6:30
3. "Pretender to the Throne (Opus I: The Userper's Spawn)" – 5:28
4. "The Arcane Light of Hecate" – 4:20
5. "Scarlet Witching Dreams" – 5:28
6. "The Serpent and the Pentagram" – 5:21
7. "Pretender to the Throne (Opus II: Battle at the Netherworld)" – 7:51
8. "Spiritdance" – 6:26
9. "Demon's Whip" (Manowar cover, bonus track on 2006 re-issue)
