= Khronos (Rotting Christ album) =

Studio album by Rotting Christ
- Released: August 28, 2000
- Recorded: March 2000
- Genre: Gothic metal, melodic black metal
- Length: 59:28
- Label: Century Media
- Producer: Peter Tägtgren & Sakis Tolis

Rotting Christ chronology
Sleep of the Angels (1999)	Khronos (2000)	Genesis (2002)

Professional ratings
Review scores
Source	Rating
Allmusic	3/5 stars

Khronos is the sixth full-length album by Greek extreme metal band Rotting Christ.

Following Sleep of the Angels, this record continues to show the band's experimentation with doom and gothic metal musical elements, but also a return to their more extreme earlier years as well.

It was produced by Peter Tägtgren's (Hypocrisy) Abyss Studios, whose previous credits also include releases by Dimmu Borgir and Immortal.

== Track listing ==
All songs written by Sakis Tolis, except where noted.

1. "Thou Art Blind" – 2:47
2. "If It Ends Tomorrow" – 4:28
3. "My Sacred Path" – 5:38
4. "Aeternatus" – 3:14
5. "Art of Sin" – 5:18
6. "Lucifer Over London" (David Tibet) – 5:15
7. "Law of the Serpent" – 2:08
8. "You Are I" – 3:27
9. "Khronos" – 6:37
10. "Fateless" – 4:10
11. "Time Stands Still" – 5:04
12. "Glory of Sadness" (ends at 5:35; hidden track begins at 9:03) – 11:32

Brazil Edition bonus track

13. "Phobia" – 5:34

== Personnel ==
- Sakis Tolis – guitar, vocals
- Kostas Vassilakopoulos – guitar
- Andreas Lagios – bass
- Georgios Tolias – keyboards
- Jan Roger Halvorsen – drums
