= Love Spit Love =

American alternative rock band (1992–2000)

- Love Spit Love in 1994, from left to right Frank Ferrer, Richard Fortus, Richard Butler and Tim Butler

Background information
- Origin: Manhattan, New York City, US
- Genres: Alternative rock; post-grunge
- Years active: 1992–2000
- Labels: Maverick; Imago
- Spinoff of: The Psychedelic Furs
- Past members: Richard Butler; Tim Butler; Frank Ferrer; Richard Fortus; Lonnie D. Hillyer; Chris Wilson

Love Spit Love was an English–American alternative rock band founded in 1992 by the English singer Richard Butler during the 1990s hiatus of the Psychedelic Furs. The band released two studio albums and has not been active since 2000.

== History ==
When the Psychedelic Furs went on extended hiatus in 1992, Richard Butler contacted guitarist Richard Fortus, whose band, Pale Divine, had been the opener on the Psychedelic Furs' final US tour. The two began to collaborate on what Butler expected would become his first solo record. The duo enlisted drummer Frank Ferrer and Butler's brother (and Furs bandmate) Tim Butler on bass. (the younger Butler also co-wrote six songs on the album.) to help develop the material. As the songs took shape, however, Butler opted to push the project into a new band. The band's name was taken from a 1991 performance art exhibit in New York, which featured three naked couples (of varying sexual orientation) openly engaging in acts of affection. The event was the brainchild of publicist Kelly Cutrone and her husband Ronnie Cutrone, an artist who worked closely with Andy Warhol; the event was aimed at protesting government censorship of "obscene" music and art.

The completed self-titled album was released in August 1994 on Imago Records. The album made it into the US charts, peaking at No. 195 on the Billboard 200 in October 1994.

The album's lead single, "Am I Wrong", reached No. 83 on the US Hot 100, and was warmly received at alternative radio and MTV. (The song eventually appeared on the soundtrack to the 1995 movie Angus, with a marching band (Warren Township Marching Blue Devils of Gurnee, Illinois) added to the background of the song.)

Richard Butler and Fortus undertook a series of promotional tour dates in mid-1994, performing acoustically. For a late 1994 tour, the band enlisted bassist Lonnie Hillyer. The fall touring included an appearance on The Jon Stewart Show, where the band performed their second single "Change in the Weather".

Near the end of 1995, the band was approached by the music supervisor of the movie The Craft, who inquired if they might record a cover of The Smiths' "How Soon Is Now?" After initial reluctance, they recorded the song, and it was released as a single from the movie's soundtrack in 1996. The band's cover was reused as the theme song for the television series Charmed, which debuted in 1998.

For most of 1995 and 1996, the band found themselves in a precarious situation with their label. Imago Records, which was founded as a joint venture between Terry Ellis and BMG, as it ended its distribution deal with BMG at the end of 1994. Ellis retained the contracts to the label's acts and hoped to find a new distributor. By 1996, however, the label released the band to find a new home. Later that year, Love Spit Love signed with Maverick Records. In the meantime, Chris Wilson had replaced Hillyer on bass.

The band's second album, Trysome Eatone, was released in August 1997. The album spawned two singles, "Long Long Time" and "Fall on Tears".

After touring in support of the album, Love Spit Love spent the rest of the 1990s idle, before announcing an indefinite hiatus in 2000. That year, the Psychedelic Furs decided to reform, with both Fortus and Ferrer joining the reformed lineup. Fortus is currently a member of Guns N' Roses along with Ferrer.

== Discography ==
=== Albums ===
- Love Spit Love (1994) – US No. 195
- Trysome Eatone (1997)

=== Singles ===
Year	Title	Chart positions			Album
Year	Title	US	US Alt.	AUS	Album
1994	"Change in the Weather"	—	31	—	Love Spit Love
1994	"Am I Wrong"	83	3	89	Love Spit Love
1997	"Long Long Time"	—	33	—	Trysome Eatone
1997	"Fall on Tears"	—	39	—	Trysome Eatone
