= Love Spit Love (album) =

Studio album by Love Spit Love
- Released: August 2, 1994
- Recorded: January to March 1994
- Genre: Alternative rock
- Length: 51:52
- Label: Imago
- Producer: Dave Jerden

Love Spit Love chronology
Love Spit Love (1994)	Trysome Eatone (1997)

Singles from Love Spit Love
- 1. "Change in the Weather" Released: 1994; 2. "Am I Wrong" Released: 1994

Professional ratings
Review scores
Source	Rating
AllMusic	3/5 stars
Chicago Tribune	2.5/4 stars
The Encyclopedia of Popular Music	3/5 stars
Entertainment Weekly	B−
MusicHound Rock: The Essential Album Guide	2/5 stars
Rolling Stone	2/5 stars

Love Spit Love is the debut studio album by the rock band Love Spit Love. It was released in 1994 on Imago Records.

== Production ==
The album was recorded in New York City, and produced by Dave Jerden.

== Critical reception ==
The Riverfront Times called the album a "fantastic moodpiece" and a "bargain bin treasure." Trouser Press wrote that Richard Butler's "nicotine-coated growl has, over the years, mellowed into a powerful scratchy croon that shimmers on his most accessible record since the Furs’ glory days."

== Track listing ==
1. "Seventeen" (Richard Butler, Tim Butler, Richard Fortus) – 4:17
2. "Superman" (R. Butler, T. Butler) – 4:14
3. "Half a Life" (R. Butler, T. Butler) – 4:10
4. "Jigsaw" (R. Butler, Fortus) – 4:08
5. "Change in the Weather" (R. Butler) – 3:11
6. "Wake Up" (R. Butler, Fortus) – 4:02
7. "Am I Wrong" (R. Butler, T. Butler) – 3:34
8. "Green" (R. Butler, Fortus) – 5:11
9. "Please" (R. Butler, T. Butler) – 4:46
10. "Codeine" (R. Butler, Eric Schermerhorn) – 4:51
11. "St. Mary's Gate" (R. Butler, Fortus) – 5:26
12. "More" (R. Butler, T. Butler) – 4:00

Some international versions included the bonus track "All She Wants".

== Personnel ==
Love Spit Love

- Richard Butler – vocals
- Richard Fortus – guitar, cello, mandolin
- Frank Ferrer – drums
- Tim Butler – bass guitar

Additional personnel

- Jon Brion – chamberlin, optigan, piano
- Eric Schermerhorn – acoustic guitar on "Codeine"
- John Phillip Shenale – string arrangements

== Charts ==
Chart (1994)	Peak position
US Billboard 200	195
