= Brian Goss =

American musician

Brian Goss (October 5, 1970) is an American guitarist, songwriter and composer who is known for being a member of the bands Dripping Goss and Warzone. He is currently the guitarist for The Noise.

Not conforming to any strict style, Goss has contributed to the hardcore, punk and acid rock scenes throughout the late eighties and nineties.

Goss has been a longtime musical collaborator with Simon Felice (Felice Brothers) and has played with members of Television, Guns N' Roses and The Misfits.

== Early life ==
Goss grew up in the Catskill Mountains in Palenville, New York. Raised by his mother and step-father, after his father left when he was 2, Goss’ introduction to music came largely from the vast record collections and music knowledge of his three older brothers.

After his older brother Robert moved to London, Goss would receive tapes in the mail by artists like Joy Division, Bauhaus and The Birthday Party, which only seemed to seal his fate as a career musician.

At the age of 9, Goss began to teach himself how to play guitar.

When Robert returned from London, he began to introduce Goss to live music by taking him to the Pyramid Club and after-hours parties at Save The Robots. Another brother, Tom, worked at The Ritz and was a roadie for The Ramones.

Music played a prominent role in his upbringing, with much of his youth devoted to tape trading, record collecting as well as forming a series of shortly lived bands.

Goss made his foray into music while still at high school, releasing his first album when he was only 17.

== Music career ==
=== The Warm Jets 1987-1989 ===
Goss formed his first successful band with his brothers Robert (Bass) and Tommy (Drums) and lifelong friend, Michael Billera (vocals) in 1987. While the band remained in Palenville for their first year, in 1988 they moved to New York City.

Upon moving to New York, they took up residence in the abandoned Talking Heads loft in Long Island City. They found themselves at the heart of the burgeoning industrial noise scene and they signed with Bob Mould’s (Hüsker Dü), label SOL records. In 1988 they released their first single, Wacked.

With New York experiencing the final throws of its punk movement, the band cut their teeth on the Lower East Side, at clubs like the Pyramid Club, CBGB, Downtown Beirut and The Lismar Lounge.

While the Warm Jets only lasted for two years, their short existence in New York had put them on the map, evidenced by the fact that during this time they played on the same bill as bands like The Ramones, Pussy Galore, Circle X, Live Skull and also with Jane’s Addiction on their 1989 Nothing’s Shocking tour.

The band split up in 1989 when Tom Goss left to play with Jack Bruce (Cream).

=== Dripping Goss 1991 - 1999 ===
Two years after Tom Goss left, the brothers reunited to form the most successful band of their musical partnership, Dripping Goss.

Goss described the band’s sound in an interview by saying: "I always thought of Dripping Goss as an acid rock band, always. That was the idea. Later they called it "stoner rock" but we were more acid."

With Goss on both guitar and vocals, Tom on drums and long-time friend Tony Ricci on bass, Dripping Goss released their 1991 debut album Flake. Released on BTG Records (Brian and Tommy Goss Records), Flake was described as "a manifestation of acid rock brilliance".

While touring to promote Flake, Tony Ricci was fired as bass player. He was replaced by, then roadie, and former go-kart driver, Dan Souza.

After returning from the tour, the band took to the studio to record again. This time Souza moved to guitar duties, in a partnership with Goss that would last for the rest of the band's life, and Chuck Valle from the band Murphy's Law moved to the vacant spot on bass.

With this lineup, Dripping Goss were able to make their sound tighter and music more potent. Their next release was the Shifter EP, which was especially popular among the underground tape-trading scene that existed in the early nineties.

However, on 17 July 1994, Valle died after being stabbed in California. The album that followed was the 1995 album, Blowtorch Consequence, which used a minimalist and atmospheric feel to address the themes of mourning and loss.

The tour that followed would see the band play with the likes of Fugazi but also lead to the band's partial dissolution. After the unexpected resignation of Tommy Goss at the tour's end, Dripping Goss had only two members left - Goss and Dan Souza. This led to Goss taking some time away from the band during which he became a member of Warzone.

By the time Goss started the band again, they had been dropped by their label, Another Planet Records, but after adding Curt Steyer on bass and Frank Ferrer (Guns N' Roses, Psychedelic Furs), who was shortly replaced by Tobias Ralph (Lauryn Hill, King Crimson, Tricky) on drums, they were signed to IndieCent Magazine's label Popsmart Records.

Their next release, Gift Of Demise EP, was a stronger collaborative effort between Goss and Souza and featured arguably the band's most famous song Before The Fall.

Lorne Behrman referenced the song in her short story Bummertime Blues, featured in the Village Voice, in a scene where one character recommends it to another, the scene reads: "So you'd probably dig the dissonant jiggle of Dripping Goss's 'Before the Fall.' Personally, the verses were a bit arty, but the chunky breakdowns and spacey outro jam were smokin’."

For, what would be their last release, the band recorded at IWII Studios in New Jersey. The 1998 album called Blue Collar, Black Future was engineered by Roy Cicala,(John Lennon) and produced by Genya Ravan. The album’s cover featured a photo by Mick Rock.

It was rehearsed in something of a psychedelic sanctuary that Goss created in Manhattan. The importance of this space was summed up by Goss when he said: "For me, to hear the record and really listen to it, it smells like the room".

In their review, All Music said of the album: "Don't expect to get this one in a single spin; Blue Collar, Black Future follows in the footsteps of Lou Reed's dark classic Berlin as another sullen "film for the ear." It is a unique statement for those who like to take dark alleys like this for their entertainment."

The band split up in 1999.

=== Warzone 1994 - 1997 ===
In 1994 Goss joined seminal New York hardcore band, Warzone. Goss and lead singer, Raymond "Raybeez" Barbieri, met when they worked at The Ritz and Goss joined the band upon the recommendation of Todd Youth (Motörhead, Ace Frehley).

Goss played guitar on the albums: Split with Cause for Alarm and Lower East Side, both of which were released by Victory Records. Goss then toured with Warzone through Europe and Japan.

Goss continued to play with the band until Babieri’s death in 1997.

=== Fuzz Deluxe 2000 - 2003 ===
Goss next project was with, then, young poet from Palenville named Simon Felice. Recognising the talent of the man who would later found The Felice Brothers, Goss put together Fuzz Deluxe so Felice would have a band around him.

With the two sharing their love for 70s AM music and an understanding that comes from growing up in the same town, they wrote over 50 songs together.

The band was originally a lounge band and they gigged in supper clubs as well as playing notorious late-night parties at Joe’s Pub in the New York Public Theater.

Fuzz Deluxe marked a change in Goss’ musical direction, to which he once said: "Dripping Goss weren’t a harmony band, but then I got into harmonies working with Simone Felice."

While the band only lasted two years, before Simon Felice left to create what would become the Felice Brothers, Goss and Felice continue to work together on each other's solo projects as well as Felice's other band The Duke and The King.

=== The Firing Line 2009 ===
It was after Goss returned from playing on The Duke and The King's European tour that he entered the studio to record his first solo album.

In 2009, Goss released his first full solo album called The Firing Line. For the introspective album, Goss enlisted his brother, Tom Goss, to help out on the album. The two had not recorded together since the making of Blowtorch Consequence.

The album was recorded at Applehead Studios in Woodstock, New York and was produced by Mike Birnbaum and Chris Bittner (Codeseven, Coheed and Cambria, John Mayer).

The album was written in the wake of Goss’ divorce and was regarded by many as being reminiscent of the more introspective and quieter moment of Dripping Goss. Morgan Evans wrote in his review:

"The Firing Line is an album that explores themes of loss and embracing life. Its lyrics and characters create vivid imagery and draw musical influences from artists such as Nick Drake and the Rolling Stones.

Evans' found the range of songs in the album to be noteworthy, including piano ballads and "country-tinged forays into marijuana country."

A review in the Daily Freeman, said that: "Goss' compelling voice can make anything sound good, and his songs take it even higher. This is one fine record.

=== Children Of The Sun 2011 ===
On 29 November 2011, Goss released an EP called Children of The Sun.

=== The Noise - 2012 - present ===
Goss is the guitarist and founding member of the New York punk-rock band, The Noise, which also features Arthur "Googy" King (founding member of The Misfits) on vocals, George Musa on bass and Dave Blackshire on drums.

The Noise "takes its musical influences from the over crowded and extremely loud streets of New York City." In many ways the Noise is a throwback to bands from the early New York punk scene as well as those who existed when Goss moved to New York for the first time in the late eighties.

The band's first 45 single, East of First/Savior at Night, featured Billy Fica (Television) and Eric Miles Levy (Orgy, Lit ). The Noise released their self-titled debut album on 27 February 2015.

Following the release of the album, The Noise embarked on a tour of America, Canada and Europe.

=== Additional projects and contributions ===
Goss has worked for Gary Posner's (Tom Tom Club) production company Whirled Music where he was responsible for creating scores for the Discovery Channel, History Channel, Nickelodeon and ESPN.

He has played as a session guitarist for Duke and the King's record Northing Gold Can Stay.
