= Frank Ferrer =

American drummer (born 1966)

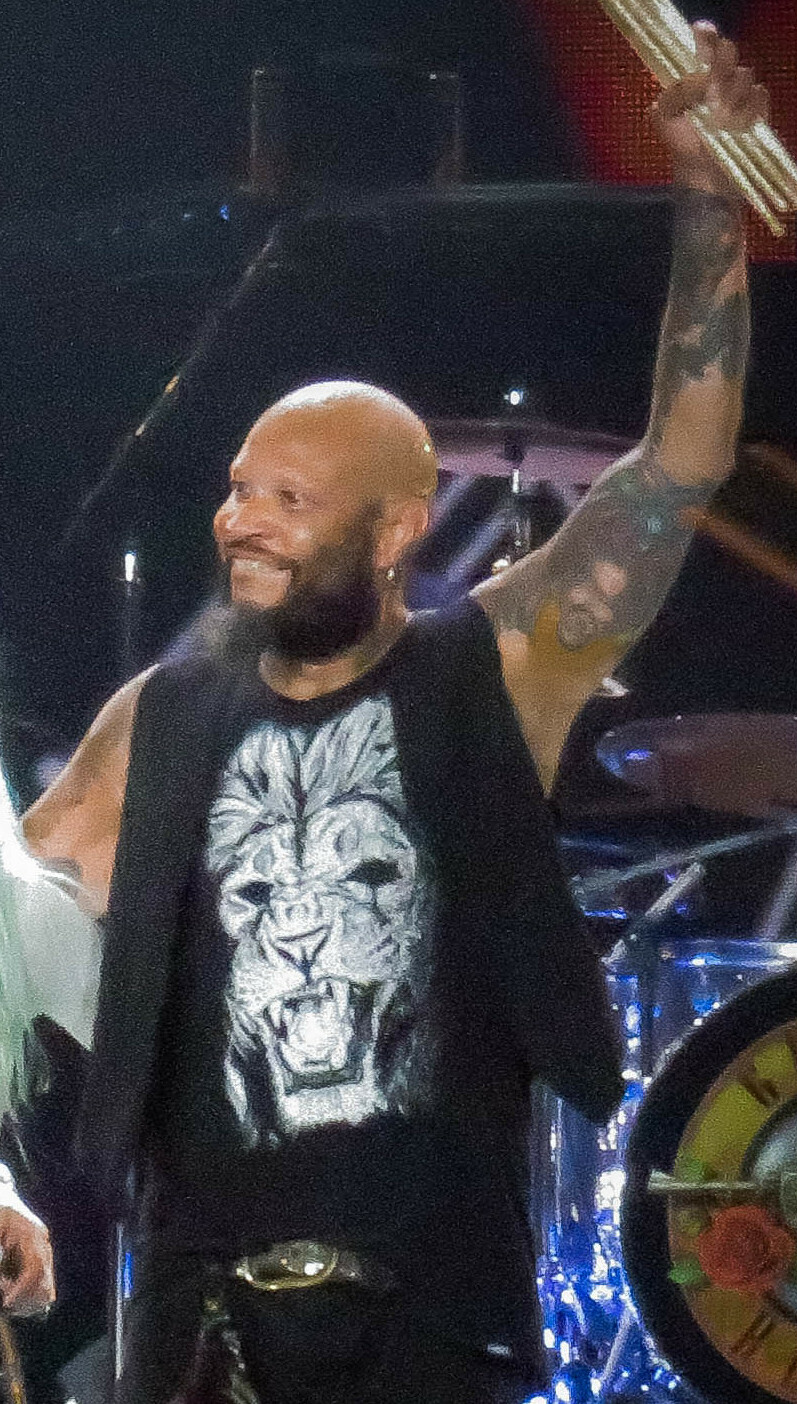
- Ferrer in 2016

Background information
- Also known as: "Thunderchucker"
- Born: March 25, 1966 (age 60)
- Origin: Brooklyn, New York, U.S.
- Genres: Hard rock; alternative rock; heavy metal
- Occupation: Musician
- Instrument: Drums
- Years active: 1989–present
- Member of: The Compulsions; Pssr
- Formerly of: Guns N' Roses; The Beautiful; Love Spit Love; The Psychedelic Furs; The Dead Daisies

Frank Ferrer (born March 25, 1966) is an American musician. He is best known as the drummer for hard rock band Guns N' Roses, with whom he played, toured, and recorded from 2006 to 2025. He was the longest tenured drummer in the band's history. Ferrer was also a member of The Psychedelic Furs, Love Spit Love as well as The Beautiful. He has recorded and worked with several high profile musicians including Robi "Draco" Rosa, Tool, Gordon Gano, PJ Harvey, Tommy Stinson, Nena, Frank Black of The Pixies, Neil Young, Perry Farrell and Cheetah Chrome of The Dead Boys.

== Career ==
=== The Beautiful (1988–1993) ===
Ferrer was a member of New York based band The Beautiful. The band featured Ferrer on drums along with Jonathan Lacey on vocals and guitar, and bassist Perry Bottke. The band released a self-titled EP in 1990, and a full-length album Storybook, in May 1992.

=== Psychedelic Furs & Love Spit Love (1992–2008) ===
Ferrer joined Love Spit Love in 1992. The band was formed by Richard Butler with Ferrer and Richard Fortus while The Psychedelic Furs were on hiatus. Love Spit Love released their self titled album Love Spit Love in 1994 and Trysome Eatone in 1997. During this time Ferrer also played on demos Dripping Goss' album Gift of Demise. From 2001 until 2008, Ferrer joined the touring lineup (along with Fortus) of The Psychedelic Furs.

=== The Compulsions (2004–present) ===
Ferrer is drummer for the New York City based band The Compulsions. The band features Rob Carlyle on vocals and rhythm guitar, fellow Guns N' Roses member Richard Fortus on lead guitar, and bassist Sami Yaffa of Hanoi Rocks and The New York Dolls. In 2011, the band released their first full-length studio album, Beat The Devil.

=== Guns N' Roses (2006–2025) ===
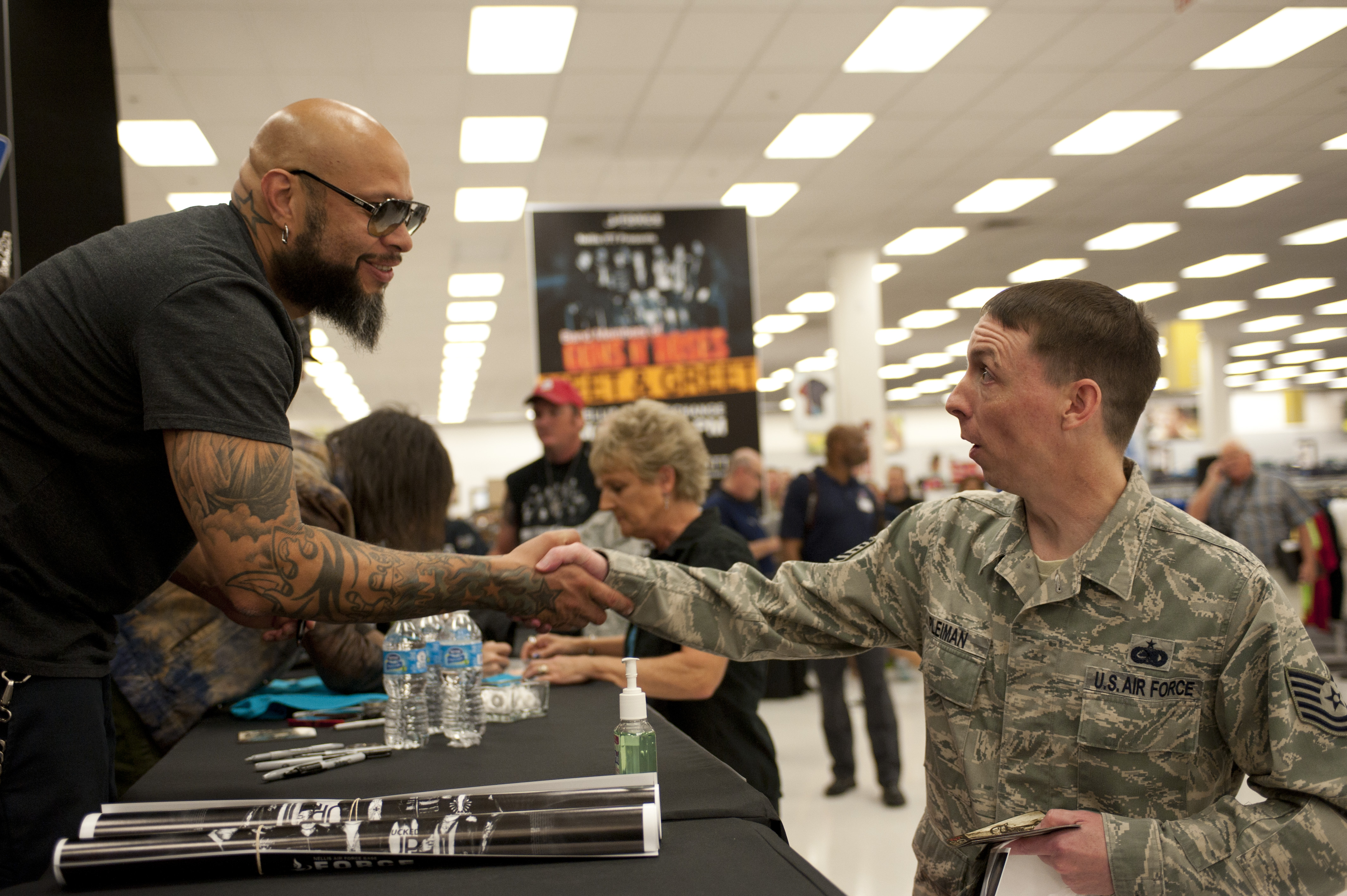
Ferrer meeting a United States Air Force member in 2014

In July 2006, Frank Ferrer joined Guns N' Roses during their European Tour to replace Bryan "Brain" Mantia, who had returned to the United States when his wife had a child. Tommy Stinson and Richard Fortus, whom Ferrer had both recorded with in the past, reached out to Ferrer to fill the drum position. Ferrer played his first show with the band on June 24, 2006, in Dessel, Belgium at Graspop Metal Meeting. Initially expected to be just a touring drummer filling in for 2 weeks, Ferrer became the official drummer in October 2006. He contributed drums to the tracks "Chinese Democracy", "Better", "If the World", "There Was a Time" and "I.R.S." on the album Chinese Democracy.

Ferrer toured with the group through the end of the Chinese Democracy Tour, as well as the Up Close and Personal Tour & Appetite for Democracy. He appears in the live video release Appetite for Democracy 3D.

He took part in the reunion Not in This Lifetime... Tour, featuring classic-era members Slash and Duff McKagan, which circled the world from 2016 to 2019. He has continued to tour with them since. On March 19, 2025, the band announced via social media Ferrer would be departing the band amicably.

=== The Dead Daisies (2013–2014) ===
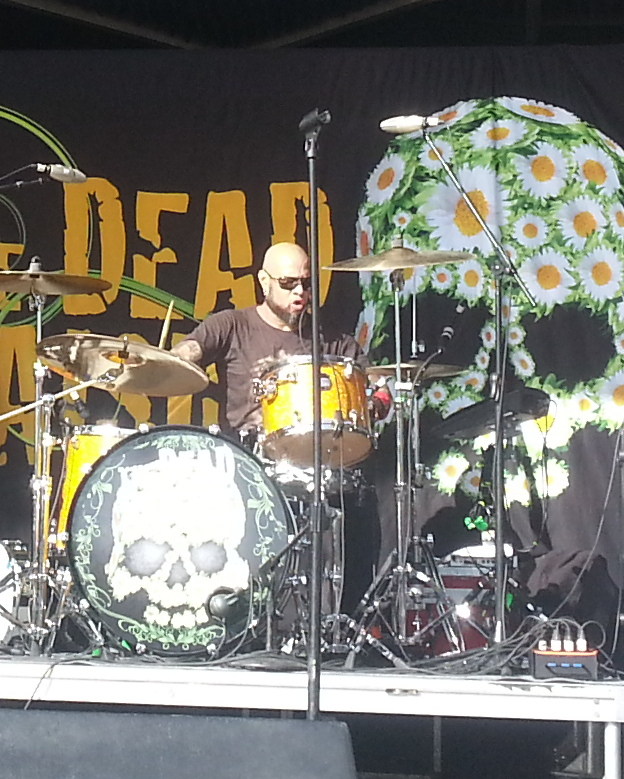
Ferrer with the Dead Daisies in 2013

Ferrer toured with The Dead Daisies in 2013 and recorded drums for their 2014 EP Face I Love.

=== PSSR (2019–present) ===
In 2019, Ferrer formed the hard rock band PSSR with singer/guitarist Eric J, bassist Brett Bass, and lead guitarist Rob Bailey, and released their first single "Busted". Two more singles were released in 2020, "Last Time" and "Push", and another in 2021 entitled "She's All Right".

== Personal life ==
Ferrer was born March 25, 1966, to Cuban parents and raised in New York. His father was a carpenter and Latin percussionist. At age 11, Ferrer saw KISS in concert at Madison Square Garden and fell in love with rock music. In 2021 he married Polish model Magdalena Dziun, The couple divorced in November 2023.

=== Landlord ===
An April 2023 article in Business Insider reported that Ferrer had been accused of predatory rental practices in Coachella Valley, California. Ferrer allegedly refused to make necessary repairs and disrupted the lives of his tenants. The property was declared a public nuisance by the city of La Quinta and remains the subject of an open investigation. Ferrer has declined to comment.

== Equipment ==
Ferrer uses DW drums, Remo drumheads, Sabian cymbals and Vater drumsticks. His drum setup according to his official website consists of a 26x14" kick drum, a 12x12" rack tom and 14x14 and 16x16" floor toms, sometimes using 16x16 and 18x16 floor toms. His Sabian cymbal setup varies from time to time along with drumheads. His choice of sticks are Vater Power 5Bs. Ferrer uses a Latin percussion rock ridge rider cowbell and various handheld tambourines. He previously used Pork Pie Percussion drums and Zildjian cymbals until 2014.

== Tours and live sessions ==
=== Tours ===
- The Beautiful US
- Love Spit Love US/EUROPE
- Rebecca Blasband US
- Robi "Draco" Rosa Latin America/Puerto Rico/US
- Doro Pesch Germany
- The Psychedelic Furs US/Canada/UK
- Gordon Gano US
- Guns N' Roses Chinese Democracy Tour 2006 Europe, North America
- Guns N' Roses Chinese Democracy Tour 2007 Mexico, Australia, New Zealand, Japan
- Guns N' Roses Chinese Democracy Tour 2009/2011 Asia, North America, South America, Central America, Europe
- Guns N' Roses Up Close and Personal Tour United States, Europe
- Guns N' Roses Appetite for Democracy Las Vegas, Nevada USA October 31, 2012 – November 24, 2012
- Guns N' Roses Not in this Lifetime... Tour (2016-2019)
- Guns N' Roses We're F'N' Back! Tour (2021-2022)
- Guns N' Roses 2023 Tour (2023)

=== Live sessions ===
- Tool – February 1, 2012 – Izod Center East Rutherford, NJ. "Lateralus" drum duel performance
- Tool – August 1, 2009 – All Points West Festival, Liberty Park, NJ. "Lateralus" drum duel performance
- Tool – August 15, 2002 – Continental Arena, NJ. Second drummer on the song "Triad"
- Wyclef Jean – Reggae Sunsplash 1999
- Tommy Stinson (Guns N' Roses/Replacements) – Series of shows in 2004 featuring Richard Fortus (Guns N' Roses)
- Frank Black/Gordon Gano – October 11, 2003, Troubadour, LA
- Thunderchucker Records – inception October 2004 New York, NY
- Perry Farrell – live show at Hiro Ballroom, NYC fashion week 2005
- Nena Vienna, Austria 2008
