= The Beautiful (band) =

American hard rock band

- Origin: New York City, United States
- Genres: Alternative rock, alternative metal
- Years active: 1988–1993
- Label: Giant Records (Warner)
- Members: Jonathan Lacey; Perry Bottke; Frank Ferrer

The Beautiful was an American rock band from New York City.

== History ==
With a line-up that consisted of Jonathan Lacey (vocals, guitar), Perry Bottke (bass), and Frank Ferrer (drums), the Beautiful signed to Warner Bros. subsidiary Giant Records, the group issued a pair of releases—a five-song, self-titled EP in September 1990, and a full-length album, Storybook, in May 1992, produced by John Fryer. The group received some media coverage, including a feature article in Rip Magazine and a video clip for the song "John Doe" being aired on the Headbangers Ball program on MTV, but by 1993, the group split up.

Since 2006, Frank Ferrer has been a member of Guns N' Roses (replacing Bryan Mantia)—supplying drums on the songs "Chinese Democracy", "Better", "If the World", "There Was a Time" and "I.R.S." on their 2008 album, Chinese Democracy, and touring throughout the world with the band. After the Beautiful and prior to joining Guns N' Roses, Ferrer also played drums for a variety of acts, including The Psychedelic Furs, Perry Farrell, Wyclef Jean and Tool, among others.

In 2012, Lacey gave this update about what he and his former band mates were up to via a posting on YouTube: "The three of us sunk our lives into the band. Many many miles in that Ford Econoline van. Frank is in Guns N' Roses now, Perry is a proud and wonderful father of a very accomplished cellist and I am fronting a RnB party/show band. Still singin about the dangers of powders and women! Check out the Johnny Tone fan page on FB. It ain't the Beautiful but I ain't 25 either. Thank you for the views and kind words. It means a lot. J H L"

In March 2014, an official Facebook page for the band was launched.

Later in 2014, Storybook came in at number two on a "Top 10 Underrated 90's Alternative Rock Albums" list at the Alternative Nation website.

Ferrer has remained a member of Guns N' Roses—including being part of the group's Not in This Lifetime... Tour, which saw Axl Rose reunite with original members Slash and Duff McKagan, serving as the group's drummer from 2006–2025.

== Discography ==
- The Beautiful (1990)
- Storybook (1992)
