= A Dead Poem =

Studio album by Rotting Christ
- Released: October 7, 1997
- Recorded: May 1997
- Genre: Gothic metal, melodic black metal
- Length: 47:25
- Label: Century Media
- Producer: Sakis Tolis & Xy

Rotting Christ chronology
Triarchy of the Lost Lovers (1996)	A Dead Poem (1997)	Sleep of the Angels (1999)

Professional ratings
Review scores
Source	Rating
Allmusic	4.5/5 stars
Chronicles of Chaos	8/10

A Dead Poem is the fourth full-length album by Greek extreme metal band Rotting Christ.

The band slowed down their tempos significantly and added occasional usage of acoustic guitars and regional music, making this particular record one of their more mainstream of releases, and the furthest removed from black metal music styles.

Moonspell's Fernando Ribeiro contributed backing vocals to the track "Among Two Storms".

It was produced at Woodhouse Studios in Hagen, Germany by Xy, programmer/percussionist for Samael, who also contributed keyboards to some tracks.

== Track listing ==
1. "Sorrowfull Farewell" – 4:52
2. "Among Two Storms" – 4:09
3. "A Dead Poem" – 4:08
4. "Out of Spirits" – 4:06
5. "As If by Magic" – 5:51
6. "Full Colour Is the Night" – 4:47
7. "Semigod" – 4:39
8. "Ten Miles High" – 4:34
9. "Between Times" – 5:03
10. "Ira Incensus" – 5:16

== Credits ==
- Sakis Tolis – guitar, vocals
- Costas Vassilakopoulos – guitar
- Andreas Lagios – bass
- Georgios Tolias – keyboards
- Themis Tolis – drums, backing vocals
