= Moribund Oblivion =

Turkish metal band

- Origin: Istanbul, Turkey
- Genre: Black metal
- Years active: 1999–present
- Label: Talheim Records Germany
- Members: Bahadır Uludağlar; İlkay Canaydın; Emir Cosovic; Feyzi Ocak
- Past members: Duygu Soysal; Engin Ufuk Kaplan; Uğur Keçecioğlu; Fatih Kanık; Oğuz Akalın; Gökhan Köse; Barbaros Ali Kaynak; Adam Şentürk; Serdal Semen; Gökhan Sancaklı
- Website: www.moribundoblivion.net

Moribund Oblivion is a Turkish black metal band from Istanbul, formed by vocalist Bahadır Uludağlar in 1999. The band has generated the most international attention out of Turkish black metal. It has played several festivals, such as Heathen Crusade, and toured internationally, including a number of album promotion tours in Germany.

== Career ==
The Like a Falling Haze EP was released in 2002 to promote their first studio album, Khanjar, released on 6 January 2004. That day, Moribund Oblivion supported Portuguese metal band Moonspell. The band also conducted the first black metal tour of Turkey to promote the album, appearing in Istanbul, Ankara, İzmir, Eskişehir and Bursa. At the end of the tour, the group performed at the Barisarock and Rock The Nations festivals, and played a show with Greek black metal band Rotting Christ in Istanbul. The band released a music video for the song "Ruins of Kara-Shehr", from the Khanjar album, which aired on Turkish channels TRT and Dream TV.

Moribund Oblivion signed with Istanbul record label Atlantis Music for their second album, Machine Brain, released in 2006.

In 2008, the band appeared in the Turkish newspapers Star (July 2008) and Hurriyet (September 2008), headlined the Tbilisi Metal Fest in Georgia, and performed at the Interregnum Fest in Rostock, Germany.

Drummer Fatih Kanık and bassist Serdal Semen left the group in 2022 and 2023, respectively, due to a falling out with lead singer Bahadır Uludağlar.

== Discography ==
- Like a Falling Haze EP (2002)
- Khanjar (2004)
- Machine Brain (2006)
- Time to Face (2007)
- K.I.N. (2008)
- Izdırap EP (2010)
- Manevi (2013)
- Turk (2014)
- False Consolation (2017)
- Endless (2020)
- Time is an Illusion (2023)
