= Triarchy of the Lost Lovers =

Studio album by Rotting Christ
- Released: April 1996
- Recorded: March 1996
- Genres: Melodic black metal, gothic metal
- Length: 46:17
- Label: Century Media
- Producers: Rotting Christ & Andy Classen

Rotting Christ chronology
Non Serviam (1994)	Triarchy of the Lost Lovers (1996)	A Dead Poem (1997)

Professional ratings
Review scores
Source	Rating
Allmusic	4.5/5 stars

Triarchy of the Lost Lovers is the third full-length album by Greek extreme metal band Rotting Christ. This album was released in April 1996 on Century Media and was the first album to showcase a steady addition of gothic metal influence to their overall sound.

In 2013, Decibel ranked Triarchy of the Lost Lovers at number 94 on its list of the Top 100 Black Metal Albums of All Time.

== Track listing ==
- Lyrics by Jim Patsouris & Music by Sakis Tolis. (Copyright Magic Arts Publishing.)
1. "King of a Stellar War" – 6:18
2. "A Dynasty from the Ice" – 4:29
3. "Archon" – 4:11
4. "Snowing Still" – 5:42
5. "Shadows Follow" – 4:35
6. "One with the Forest" – 4:33
7. "Diastric Alchemy" – 4:58
8. "The Opposite Bank" – 5:54
9. "The First Field of the Battle" – 5:37

== Personnel ==
- Necromayhem (aka Sakis Tolis) – guitars, vocals
- Mutilator – bass
- Necrosauron – drums, percussion

== Production ==
- Arranged by Rotting Christ
- Produced by Rotting Christ & Andy Classen
- Recorded, engineered & mixed by Andy Classen
