= Non Serviam (album) =

Studio album by Rotting Christ
- Released: 1994
- Recorded: 1994
- Studio: Storm Studio
- Genres: Melodic black metal, thrash metal
- Length: 47:53
- Labels: Unisound Records; The End (2006 reissue)
- Producer: Rotting Christ

Rotting Christ chronology
Thy Mighty Contract (1993)	Non Serviam (1994)	Triarchy of the Lost Lovers (1996)

Professional ratings
Review scores
Source	Rating
Allmusic	4.5/5 stars

Non Serviam is the second full-length album by Greek extreme metal band Rotting Christ, released in 1994.

In Latin, Non serviam translates to "I will not serve", and Biblically refers to Satan's refusal to serve God. It also has some different connotations in secular literary works.

After 12 years of discontinued print, the album was re-released by The End Records in 2006.

Contrary to popular belief that drum programming was used on this album, the drums were actually recorded live using an electronic drum kit.

== Track listing ==
- All songs written by Mutilator & Necromayhem, except where noted. (Copyright Unisound Music.)
1. "The Fifth Illusion" – 5:33
2. "Wolfera the Chacal" – 7:13
3. "Non Serviam" – 5:01
4. "Morallity of a Dark Age" – 5:02
5. "Where Mortals Have No Pride" – 7:48
6. "Fethroesforia" – 1:36 [instrumental]
7. "Mephesis of Black Crystal" – 5:24
8. "Ice Shaped God" – 3:54
9. "Saturn Unlock Avey's Son" – 6:22

== Personnel ==
- Necromayhem (Sakis Tolis) – guitars, vocals
- Magus Wampyr Daoloth (George Zacharopoulos) – keyboards, synthesizers, backing vocals
- Mutilator (Dimitris Patsouris) – bass
- Necrosauron (Themis Tolis) – drums

== Production ==
- Arranged & produced by Rotting Christ
- Recorded & engineered by George Zaharopoulos
