= Genesis (Rotting Christ album) =

Studio album by Rotting Christ
- Released: August 26, 2002
- Recorded: May 2002
- Genre: Black metal Gothic metal
- Length: 51:26
- Label: Century Media
- Producer: Andy Classen

Rotting Christ chronology
Khronos (2000)	Genesis (2002)	Sanctus Diavolos (2004)

Professional ratings
Review scores
Source	Rating
Allmusic	4/5 stars

Genesis is the seventh full-length album by the Greek extreme metal band Rotting Christ.

The release showed some return to the group's more aggressive early days as a black metal band, featuring fast, percussive tempos and raw vocals, as well as some gothic and doom elements from middle releases.

It was produced by Andy Classen in Germany at the Stage-One-Studio, also used by Krisiun, Belphegor and Callenish Circle.

== Track listing ==
All songs written by Sakis Tolis.

1. "Daemons" – 3:27
2. "Lex Talionis" – 5:03
3. "Quintessence" – 4:45
4. "Nightmare" – 7:08
5. "In Domine Sathana" – 5:16
6. "Release Me" – 3:51
7. "The Call of the Aethyrs" – 4:32
8. "Dying" – 4:48
9. "Ad Noctis" – 6:11
10. "Under the Name of the Legion" – 6:29

Brazil Edition bonus track

11. "Astral Enbodyment" – 5:51

== Popular culture ==
The track "Ad Noctis" was featured on the soundtrack of the metal-themed video game Brütal Legend.

== Credits ==
- Sakis Tolis – guitar, vocals
- Kostas Vassilakopoulos – guitar
- Andreas Lagios – bass
- Georgios Tolias – keyboards
- Themis Tolis – drums
