= Thy Mighty Contract =

Studio album by Rotting Christ
- Released: 1993
- Recorded: November–December 1992
- Studio: Molon Lave Studio
- Genres: Melodic black metal, thrash metal
- Length: 35:25 (re-issue; 45:15)
- Labels: Osmose; Century Media (reissue)
- Producers: George Osmak, Anthony Delaportas, Rotting Christ

Rotting Christ chronology
Passage to Arcturo (1991)	Thy Mighty Contract (1993)	Non Serviam (1994)

Professional ratings
Review scores
Source	Rating
AllMusic	3.5/5 stars

Thy Mighty Contract is the debut studio album by Greek extreme metal band Rotting Christ, released in 1993 on Osmose Productions.

It was re-released by Century Black in January 1998 with two bonus tracks originally released on the Apokathelosis EP and different artwork.

Contrary to popular belief that drum programming was used on this album, the drums were actually recorded live using an electronic drum kit.

== Musical style ==
Rotting Christ plays fast melodic black metal in the Greek style, which was, according to AllMusic journalist Eduardo Rivadavia, “slightly over-reliant on furious blastbeats”, but showing “a budding flair for melody”. Chad Bowar of About.com describes the style as black metal which “took on a melodic, slightly heavy metal-ish format“, with a “limited supply of rhythm blasting and lifeless tremolo riffing”.

== Reviews ==
Allmusic journalist Eduardo Rivadavia called Thy Mighty Contract “a promising first long-player”, although “the album's production may have been somewhat subpar, and its songs slightly over-reliant on furious blastbeats, but none of this mattered a lick to hardcore extreme metal fans”. About.com featured the album as a Retro Recommendation and criticised the drums for being “too loud, and given the repetitive beats played, it becomes distracting at times. However, the bass is audible, which automatically makes the record something to cherish.“

In 2013, Decibel ranked Thy Mighty Contract at number 18 on its list of the Top 100 Black Metal Albums of All Time.

== Track listing ==
1. "The Sign of Evil Existence" – 2:00
2. "Transform All Sufferings into Plagues" – 5:25
3. "Fgmenth, Thy Gift" – 4:29
4. "His Sleeping Majesty" – 5:50
5. "Exiled Archangels" – 5:07
6. "Dive the Deepest Abyss" – 3:33
7. "The Coronation of the Serpent" – 4:06
8. "The Fourth Knight of Revelation (I & II)" – 6:49

Reissue bonus tracks

9. "Visions of the Dead Lover" - 4:45
10. "The Mystical Meeting" - 5:03

== Personnel ==
- Necromayhem: Vocals, guitars
- George "Magus Wampyr Daoloth" Zaharapolous: Keyboards, backing vocals
- Jim "Mutilator" Patsouris: Bass
- Necrosauron: Drums

== Production ==
- Arranged by Rotting Christ
- Produced by Rotting Christ, George Osmak and Anthony Delaportas
- Recording and Mix Engineer: Anthony Delaportas; assisted by George Osmak
