= Arsames (band) =

Iranian death metal band

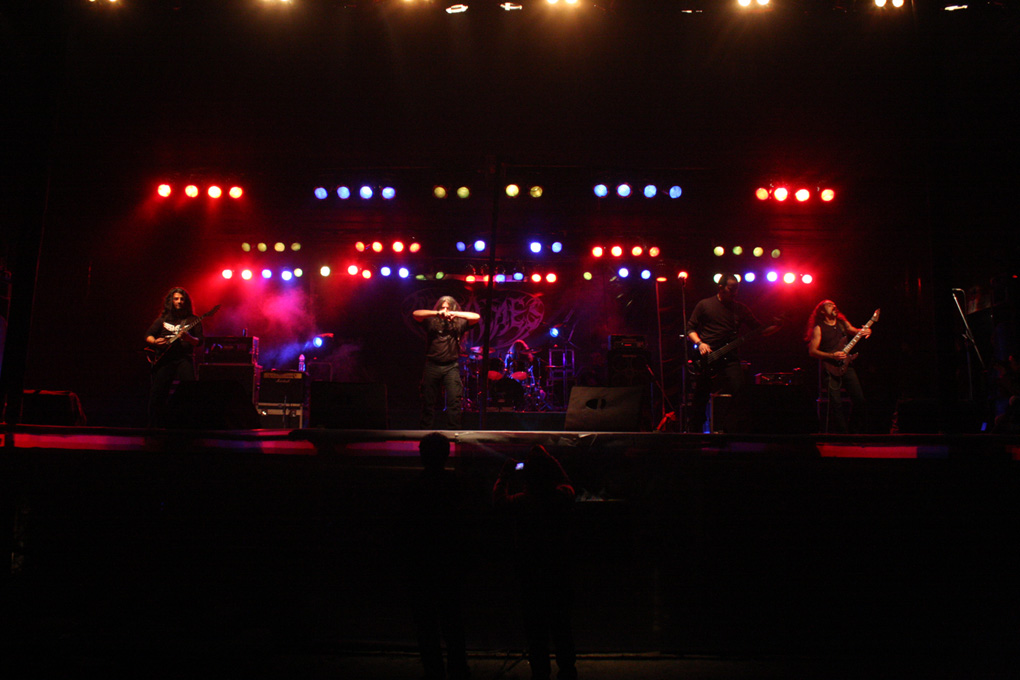
- Arsames at Sikkim Metal Fest, India, 2010

Background information
- Origin: Mashhad, Iran
- Genres: Death metal; melodic death metal
- Years active: 2002–present
- Members: Ali Madarshahi; Saeed Mokari; Soroush Kheradmand
- Past members: Levik Yeremian; Morteza Shahrami; Saeed Shariat; Ahmad Tokalou; Hamed Azizi; Hamid Yousefi Faverani; Hamid Alizadeh; Ali Sanaei; Rouzbeh Zourchang

Arsames is an Iranian death metal band based in Mashhad. It was originally formed in 2002 by Ali Madarshahi. Arsames has had many lineup changes; vocalist and first drummer Ali Madarshahi is the only original member remaining. The band took their name from a king of the Persian empire during the Achaemenid dynasty, Arsames.

The band plays death metal despite this genre being illegal in Iran and, according to them, considered Satanic by the government.

== History ==
Arsames was formed in 2002. They recorded their debut single "Adiposere" in 2005 in their home studio. In 2006, they independently released the EP Cyclopia.

In 2007, Malaysian documentary maker Zan Azlee interviewed the band as part of I'm Muslim Too!, a documentary on youth in the Middle East.

In April 2010, the band played at Metal Asylum in Dubai. In November, they played the metal festival Sikkim Fest in India. They released their debut album, Immortal Identity, the same year.

In July 2011, Arsames announced that they would release an EP of covers titled Persian Death Metal Tribute to Warriors of Metal through the summer of 2011.

=== Arrest, persecution, and escape ===
In 2017, Madarshahi, Mokari, and Kheradmand were arrested on charges of Satanism and taken to Vakilabad Prison. They were later released on bail and ordered to stop their activities, an order which they did not heed. The Iranian government eventually sentenced the band members to 5 years in prison each. In August 2020, all three escaped from Iran. Two members of another Iranian metal band, Confess, had been similarly persecuted and sentenced to prison time before fleeing the country in 2015. They were later granted asylum in Norway.

== Band members ==
Current members

- Ali Madarshahi - vocals
- Saeed Mokari - bass
- Soroush Kheradmand - drums

Former members

- Levik Yeremian - guitar
- Morteza Shahrami - guitar
- Saeed Shariat - drums
- Ahmad Tokalou - guitar
- Hamed "Fetusgrinder" Azizi - vocals
- Hamid Yousefi Faverani - guitar
- Hamid Alizadeh - guitar
- Ali Sanaei - bass
- Rouzbeh Zourchang - bass

== Discography ==
EPs

- Cyclopia (2006)
- Persian Death Metal Tribute to Warriors of Metal (2011)

Studio albums

- Immortal Identity (2010)
