= Necromantia =

- Origin: Athens, Greece
- Genre: Black metal
- Years active: 1989–2021
- Labels: Unisound Records; Osmose Productions; Black Lotus Records; Dockyard 1 Records; The Circle Music
- Website: https://necromantiaofficial.bandcamp.com/

Necromantia was a Greek black metal band founded in 1989 in Athens. Alongside Rotting Christ and Varathron, they are considered pioneers in the Greek black metal scene from the early 1990s. The band lacked rhythm guitar, substituted by an eight-string bass guitar. The band frequently used musical instruments not associated with black metal, such as saxophone and flute.

In November 2019, following founding member Baron Blood's death, Necromantia announced it would disband after the album To the Depths We Descend....

== History ==
George "The Magus" Zacharopoulos (formerly "Magus Wampyr Daoloth", as well as "Morbid" when collaborating with Rotting Christ) on bass/vocals and Makis "Baron Blood" Kanakaris in 8-string bass founded Necromantia in 1989. The two were the only consistent band members. Session musicians played other instruments.

Necromantia released their official debut, Crossing the Fiery Path, in 1993 through Osmose Productions. Their second full-length, Scarlet Evil Witching Black, came out in 1995. The pagan-themed mini-CD Ancient Pride followed in 1997. After parting with Osmose, the band returned in 2000 with IV Malice on Black Lotus Records. Black Lotus re-issued the band's previous albums in various forms, as well as the compilation album Covering Evil (12 Years Doing the Devil's Work). The band reportedly worked on the album Temple of the Skull in 2003. It was never released. Necromantia released their next full-length album, The Sound of Lucifer Storming Heaven, on Dockyard 1 Records in 2007. The band's subsequent works were mostly compilations of demo works and other unreleased early material, as well as split LPs with other Greek black and death metal acts.

On November 20, 2019, Zacharopoulos announced on Facebook that fellow founding member Baron Blood had died. In subsequent announcements, he stated that the band would release a final album (originally planned as commemorative EP, but then expanded to a full-length), in Baron Blood's memory, titled To the Depths We Descend.... Following this release, Necromantia would disband and no further material would be released.

To the Depths We Descend... was released on October 15, 2021. The album contains six new songs and re-recordings of two songs from the band's demos. A number of previous band members made guest appearances to commemorate Baron Blood. It is the only Necromantia album not featuring an eight-string bass, substituted by standard rhythm guitar. This decision was made, according to The Magus, because “the use of the 8-string bass belongs to Baron Blood and it will remain with him”.

Necromantia was officially dissolved in December 2021, with The Magus stating that "The band has now descended into the Abyss."

== Band members ==
=== Last line-up ===
- George "The Magus" Zacharopoulos - bass, vocals
- George Emmanuel - guitars, keyboards
- Yannis Votsis - drums

=== Former members ===
- Baron Blood - 8-String Bass, author (died 20.11.2019)
- Fotis Benardo (Fotis Giannakopoulos) (ex-Septic Flesh) - drums
- Slow Death - backing vocals, howling, growling and whispers
- Yiannis ”The Worshipper Of Pan” Papayiannis - sax, percussions, keyboards, tablas, classical guitar, flute
- Inferno - synths, piano
- Iraklis Yalantzides - keyboards (session)
- Lambros Sfiris - keyboards (session)
- Divad (aka Dave P.) - guitar
- John Fiorentis - guitar (session)
- Nick Adams - drums (session)
- George Panou - drums (session)

== Discography ==
=== Demos ===
- Promo Tape 1990 (1990)
- Vampiric Rituals (1992)
- Demo '93 (1993)
- Promo 1993 (1993)

=== Albums ===
- Crossing the Fiery Path (Osmose, 1993)
- Scarlet Evil Witching Black (Osmose, 1995)
- IV: Malice (Black Lotus, 2000)
- The Sound of Lucifer Storming Heaven (Dockyard 1, 2007)
- To the Depths We Descend... (The Circle Music, 2021)

=== EPs / split-LPs ===
- The Black Arts / The Everlasting Sins (split with Varathron; Black Power, 1992)
- From The Past We Summon Thee (Dark Side, 1995)
- Ancient Pride (Osmose, 1997)
- People of the Sea (Dark Side, 2008)
- ...For the Temple of the Serpent Skull... (split with Acherontas; Dark Side, 2008)
- Nekromanteion - A Collection of Arcane Hexes (split with Necromancy; Soulseller, 2014)
- Primordial Evil (split with Rotting Christ; Black Vomit, 2017)

=== Compilations ===
- Covering Evil (12 Years Doing The Devil's Work) (Black Lotus, 2001)
- Cults of the Shadow (contains Crossing the Fiery Path and Scarlet Evil Witching Black; Osmose, 2002)
- Necromantia (boxed set containing Crossing the Fiery Path, Scarlet Evil Witching Black, Ancient Pride and IV: Malice; Black Lotus, 2006)
- De Magia Veterum (Dark Side Records, 2009)
- Chthonic Years / Demo Collection (Lvx Infernvm 2018)
