= Rotting Christ =

Greek black metal band

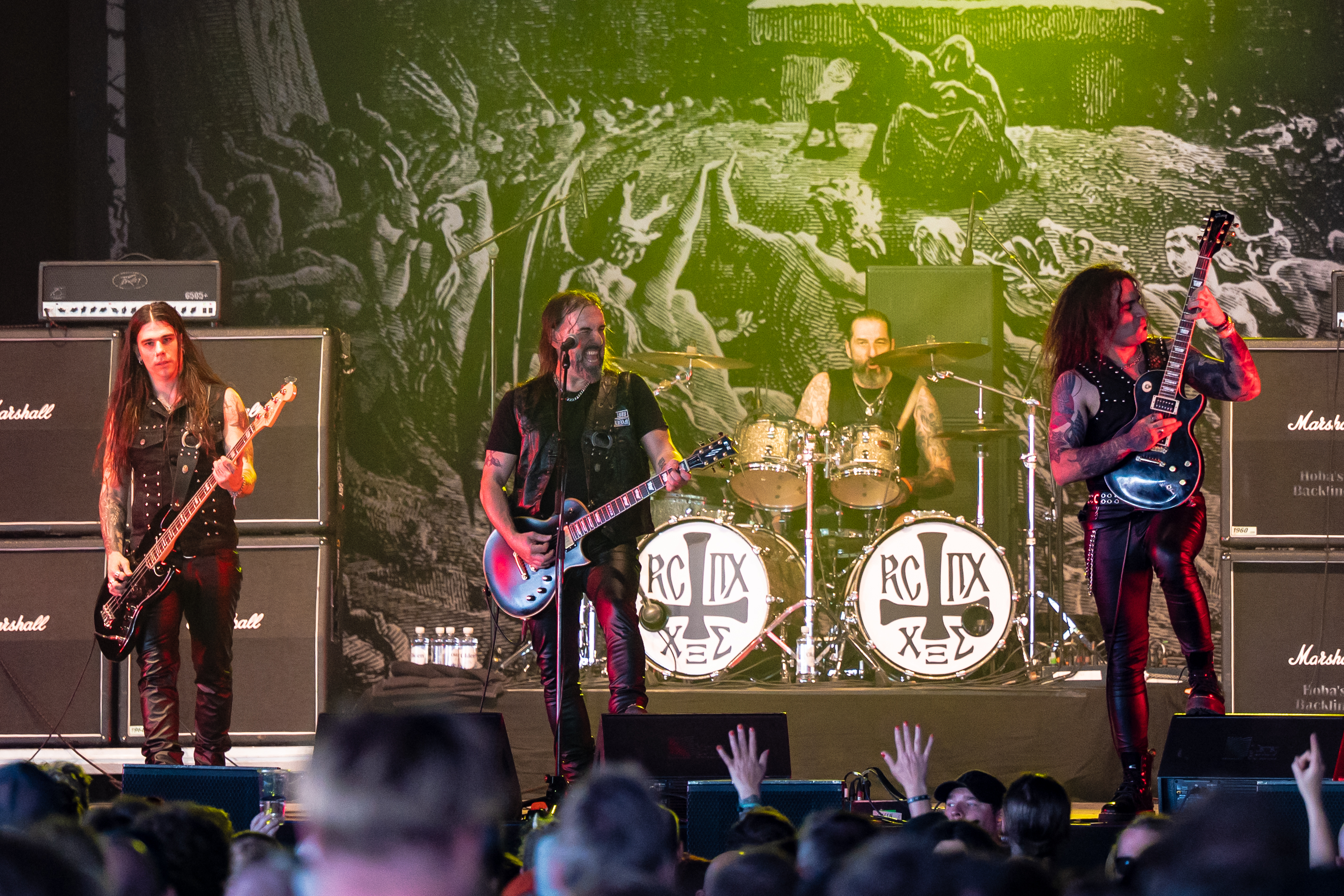
- Rotting Christ at Tons of Rock, Norway, 2024

Background information
- Origin: Athens, Greece
- Genres: Melodic black metal, gothic metal
- Years active: 1987–present
- Labels: Osmose; Unisound; Century Media; Season of Mist
- Members: Sakis Tolis; Themis Tolis; Kostas Heliotis; Kostis Foukarakis
- Past members: Jim Mutilator; Magus Wampyr Daoloth; Costas Vasilakopoulos; Andreas Lagios; Georgios Tolias; Giorgos Bokos; Vangelis Karzis; George Emmanuel; Van Ace; Melanaegis; Giannis Kalamatas
- Website: rotting-christ.com

Rotting Christ is a Greek extreme metal band. Founded in Athens in 1987, they are described as "one of the most influential, long-running metal bands to hail" from their region.

== History ==
Rotting Christ was founded in 1987 as a grindcore act. They released demos and splits with local bands during their rehearsal era. The group altered their sound with influences from proto-black metal bands like Celtic Frost and Venom, becoming an inaugurator of black metal. Their 1989 demo, Satanas Tedeum, was a crossover between black metal and grindcore. In 1991, the band released the EP Passage to Arcturo.

They played the 1993 "Fuck Christ Tour", which featured Immortal and Blasphemy. During this concert, some audience members engaged in self-harm that resulted in hospitalization. Before signing to the now-defunct Athens-based Unisound Records, (Note: Not to be confused with the Stockholm-based Unisound Recordings.) Mayhem's Øystein Aarseth expressed interest in distributing the band through Deathlike Silence Productions. Aarseth's murder that year precluded any such plans. The band signed to Century Media in 1996 and remained with the label for 10 years before joining Season of Mist.

Rotting Christ has played in many countries outside Greece, including the Americas, Greater Europe, Russia, the United Kingdom, Malta, the Middle East and South Africa. Several heavy metal festivals around the world have hosted the band, including the 2003 Wacken Open Air in Schleswig-Holstein, Germany. Past tour-mates include My Dying Bride, Tristania, Tiamat, Vintersorg, Finntroll, Agathodaimon, Old Man's Child, Malevolent Creation, Anorexia Nervosa, Vader, Krisiun, Deicide, Behemoth, Melechesh and Nile, among others.

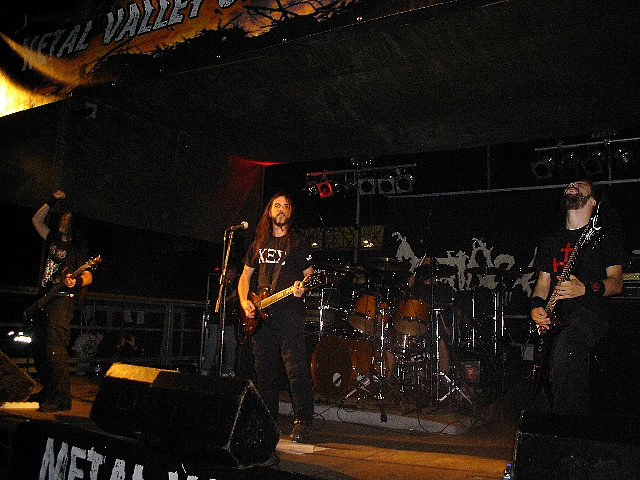
Rotting Christ performing in 2003

Rotting Christ was one of the first bands announced to perform the Barge to Hell festival, a metal-themed cruise organized by Ultimate Metal Cruises which took place aboard Royal Caribbean's Majesty of the Seas. Barge to Hell set sail from Port of Miami on 3 December 2012.

Rotting Christ is one of the longest running black metal bands. To celebrate their longevity, the band released the 2-DVD + 2-CD compilation Non Serviam: A 20 Year Apocryphal Story (shot in Athens on 8 December 2007) in Europe and North America on 23 February 2009.

The band released tenth studio album Aealo on 15 February 2010 in Europe, and 23 February 2010 in the United States.

Their eleventh album, Katá ton Daímona Eautoú, was released in March 2013.

They played South Asia for the first time on 13 September 2014, in India (Bangalore Open Air 2014 Edition) and 14 September 2014, in Sri Lanka.

They released their twelfth studio album, Rituals, on 12 February 2016.

The band released the 7-inch single "The Call" on 9 February 2018 to coincide with their 30th anniversary. The single's b-side is a live version of "The Sign of Evil Existence", with guest vocals by Behemoth's Nergal and Varathron's Stefan Necroabyssious. The band released the official biography Non Serviam: The Official Story Of Rotting Christ in late November 2018, written by Sakis Tolis and British author Dayal Patterson, and published by British publishing house Cult Never Dies. The book features interviews with Sakis Tolis, Themis Tolis, Jim Mutilator, Morbid, George Emmanuel and members of Watain, Mayhem, Enslaved, Moonspell, Blasphemy, Mystifier, Septicflesh, Behemoth, Macabre Omen, Cradle Of Filth and Immolation The book has been published in Greek, Russian and Czech.

Rotting Christ released their thirteenth studio album, The Heretics, on 15 February 2019.

In 2020, Rotting Christ announced a collaboration with video game developer Cold Symmetry on their action role-playing video game, Mortal Shell. The game's launch trailer, released in August 2020, featured the song "χξς (666)" on the soundtrack. A downloadable content pack, titled "Rotten Autumn", was released for the game in October 2020, including an alternative, Rotting Christ-composed soundtrack.

In March 2024, the band participated in the Hell's Heroes music festival at White Oak Music Hall in Houston, which Sodom and Queensrÿche headlined. The band performed an "old school set" at this event.

Rotting Christ released fourteenth studio album Pro Xristou on 20 May 2024.

Rotting Christ was announced to support Behemoth on their spring 2026 tour along with Deicide and Immolation. This tour included an appearance at the Sonic Temple music festival in Columbus, Ohio on May 14.

=== Line-up ===
The permanent line-up consists of brothers Sakis Tolis (vocals and guitar) and Themis Tolis (drums). Third founding member Jim Patsouris played bass until 1996. Andreas Lagios was the bassist since 1997, taking the stead of Patsouris until the end of 2011. Nightfall's Giorgos Bokos joined as a guitarist in 2005, replacing Costas Vasilakopoulos. In February 2012, Bokos announced his departure from the band for personal reasons. In December 2012, the new members of the band were announced: guitarist George Emmanuel and bassist Vagelis Karzis. George Emmanuel and Vagelis Karzis amicably left the band in February and May 2019 respectively to pursue other projects.

Three keyboardists had previously been a part of the band; George Tolias, George Zaharopoulos (Magus Wampyr Daoloth of Necromantia) and a session musician known only as Panayiotis (on A Dead Poem).

The band members from the beginning, up to Triarchy of the Lost Lovers album, were using the pseudonyms Necromayhem for Sakis, Necrosauron for Themis and Mutilator for Jim (Dimitris). George Zaharopoulos used the pseudonym Morbid for early EP and split-LP releases up to Passage to Arcturo, and the pseudonym Magus Wampyr Daoloth for Thy Mighty Contract and Non Serviam.

== Publicity ==
Over the years, the group has faced controversy due to their name and gained international media attention in November 1999 during the 2000 United States Presidential Primaries for Republican Nomination, when candidate/Christian conservative Gary Bauer accused the band of being "anti-Catholic", among other things. In response to Bauer's criticism, Sakis Tolis wrote:

Living in (so called) democratic societies, I think everyone should have the right to call religions as he/she wants. We in fact simply believe they are "rotting"! We are not a "satanic-crusader" type of band but rather one of the many bands that represent the dark side in nowadays Metal music.

They also have had to cancel some shows, most recently in May 2005, when Megadeth frontman Dave Mustaine threatened to refuse to play at a Greek concert if Rotting Christ were on the bill.

In response to their forced cancellation, Tolis noted:

I didn't expect something like that from Dave Mustaine, because, you know, he's supposed to be metal — you know, 'metal band,' all metal ... I just feel sorry for him and for every new Christian with new ideas, because we think Christianity is the worst thing to happen in human history. This is a well-organized trick in order to control society, so when I see someone that's very much Christian, that's full of the system, I feel very sorry for him because he's not free.

Nuclear Assault and former Anthrax bassist Dan Lilker defended Rotting Christ and criticized Dave Mustaine's actions, as did Nevermore's Warrel Dane, whose bands appeared on Mustaine's Gigantour in 2005. Dane added:

Everybody is free to believe anything he wants to; I just think that Dave misunderstood the whole subject. I have met the guys from Rotting Christ and I don't think that they are Satanists or something. I think that Dave overreacted on this.

When playing in Malta, a country which in its constitution declares itself as Roman Catholic, trouble from the Church and other Catholic groups ensued when an unknown person stuck a Rotting Christ flyer to a church door. The band was allowed to play eventually even though they had to change venue.

In April 2018, Rotting Christ were scheduled to play in Georgia. Upon arriving in Tbilisi, founding members Sakis and Themis Tolis were arrested by Georgian authorities under suspicion of terrorism due to their band name, as reported by an announcement from the band's label, Season of Mist. They had their passports and cell phones confiscated and were detained in prison, without being permitted legal representation or contact with the Greek Embassy for 12 hours. Afterwards, they were informed by their lawyers that the two were included in a "list of unwanted people for reasons of national security" that labeled them as "Satanists" and "suspects of terrorism". The two were eventually released, after arrangements made by the band's other members in collaboration with the local promoter, "who involved legal experts, journalists and activists in Georgia". The band was allowed to perform their scheduled concert and left for their next destination, Armenia, without hassle.

A species of prehistoric brittle star, Brezinacantha tolis, was named after the Tolis brothers.

== Musical style ==
Rotting Christ's take on the black metal style has been described as "notably warmer" and more influenced by traditional heavy metal than bands in the Scandinavian black metal scene. The band's style has been compared to Necromantia and Varathron.

Despite the name, the band's traditional lyrical themes involving evil and occultism has evolved into a more "mystic" path, and they have modified their musical direction on each album, utilizing elements such as clean melodic baritone vocals, doom, gothic metal and industrial music traits, and male/female Benedictine chants. Recent albums, beginning with Khronos, have shown the band taking a more modern, faster and more aggressive approach to their blackened-gothic style. Their 2007 album, Theogonia, especially, has been described as more "atmospheric" and "epic" by their label.

The group's choice of producers, engineers and mixers has also been varied; Swedish extreme metal figures Dan Swanö (Unisound), Peter Tägtgren (Abyss Studios) and Fredrik Nordström (Studio Fredman), German producers Andy Classen (Asphyx, Belphegor), Siggi Bemm (Therion, Theatre of Tragedy) and Waldemar Sorychta (Lacuna Coil, The Gathering) as well as Xy (Samael percussionist/keyboardist) have all contributed to production on the band's albums.

== Band members ==
Current members

- Sakis Tolis − lead vocals, rhythm guitar, keyboards, bass (studio only) (1987–present)
- Themis Tolis − drums (1987–present)
- Kostas "Spades" Heliotis − bass, backing vocals (2019–present)
- Kostis Foukarakis − lead guitar, backing vocals (2019–present)

Session musicians

- Markus "Makka" Freiwald − drums (1996)
- Panayiotis − keyboards (1997)

Former members

- Jim "Mutilator" Patsouris − bass, backing vocals (1987–1996)
- George "Magus Wampyr Daoloth" Zaharopoulos − keyboards, backing vocals (1991–1995)
- Costas Vasilakopoulos − lead guitar, backing vocals (1996–2004)
- Andreas Lagios − bass, backing vocals (1997–2011)
- Georgios Tolias − keyboards, backing vocals (1997–2003)
- Giorgos Bokos − lead guitar, backing vocals (2005–2012)
- George Emmanuel − lead guitar, backing vocals (2012–2019)
- Vagelis "Van Ace" Karzis − bass, backing vocals (2012–2019)
- Stamatis "Melanaegis" Petrakos − bass, backing vocals (2019)
- Giannis Kalamatas − lead guitar, backing vocals (2019)

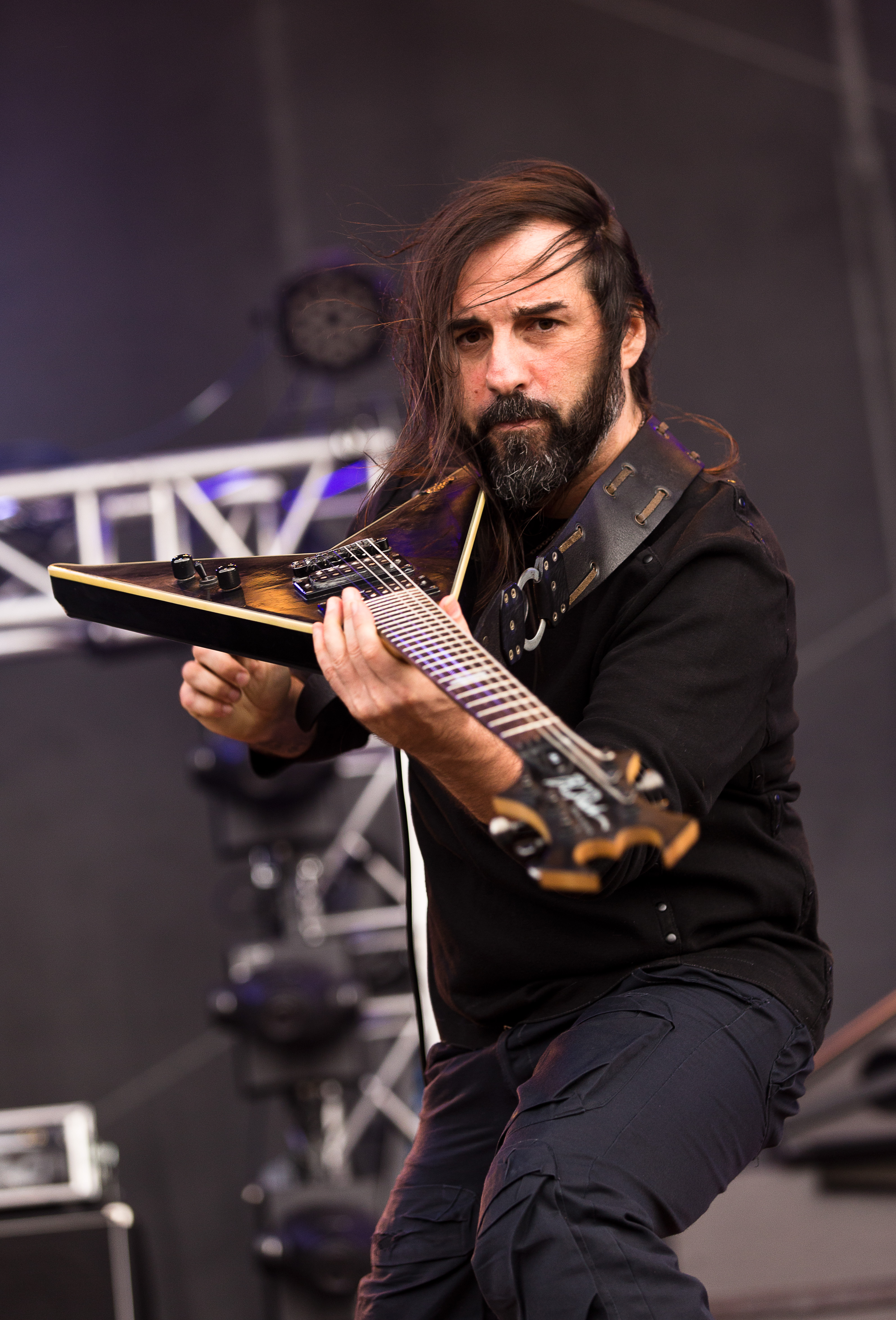
Sakis Tolis, Party.San 2015

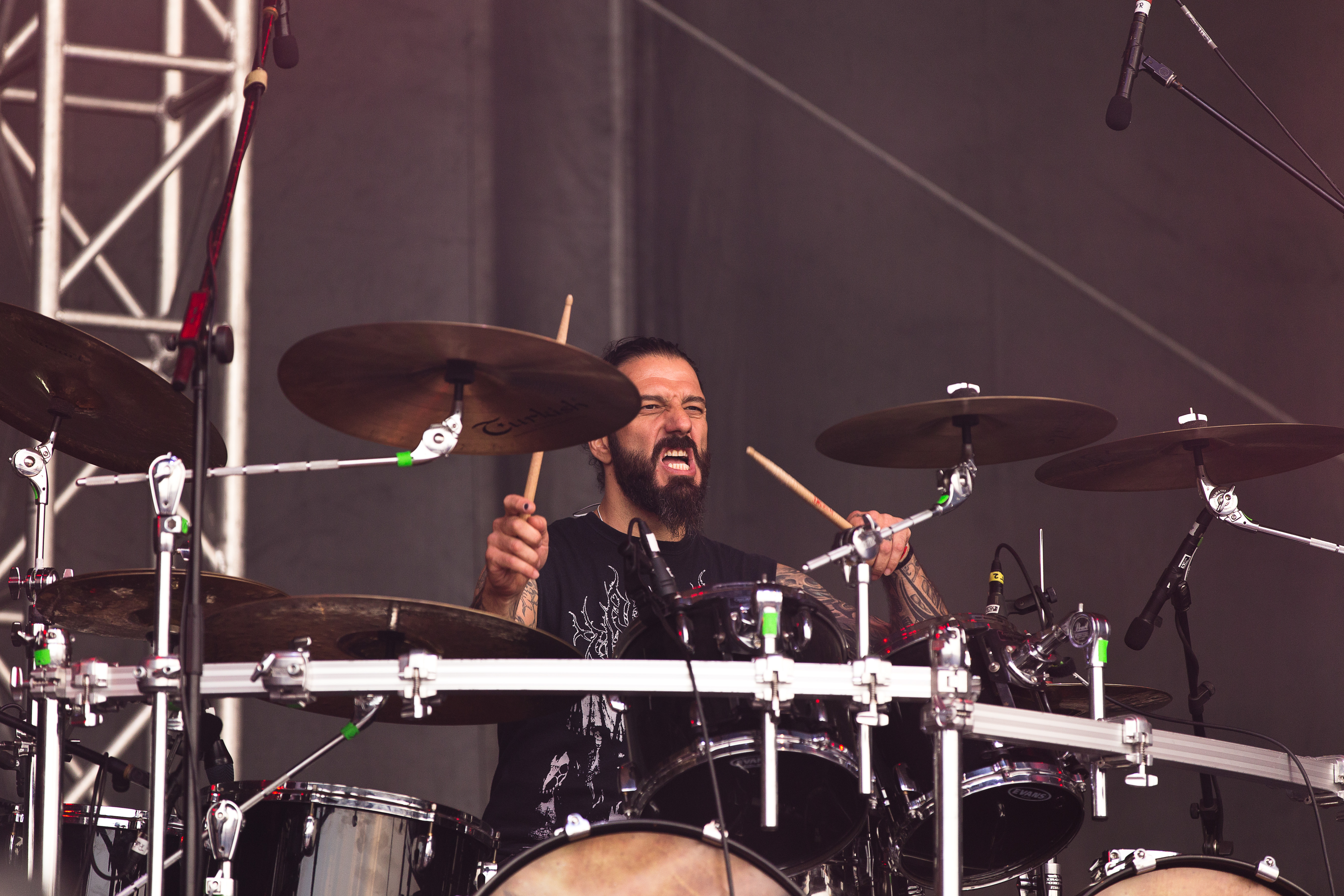
Themis Tolis, Party.San 2015

Timeline

== Discography ==
=== Full-lengths ===
- Thy Mighty Contract (1993)
- Non Serviam (1994)
- Triarchy of the Lost Lovers (1996)
- A Dead Poem (1997)
- Sleep of the Angels (1999)
- Khronos (2000)
- Genesis (2002)
- Sanctus Diavolos (2004)
- Theogonia (2007)
- Aealo (2010)
- Κατά τον δαίμονα εαυτού (2013)
- Rituals (2016)
- The Heretics (2019)
- Pro Xristou (2024)

=== Live albums ===
- Lucifer Over Athens (2015)
- 35 Years Of Evil Existence (2025)

=== EPs ===
- Passage to Arcturo (1991, Decapitated Records)

=== Demos, singles, and DVDs ===
- Leprosy of Death (1988, unofficial demo)
- Decline's Return (1989, demo)
- The Other Side of Life (1989, split EP with Sound Pollution)
- Satanas Tedeum (1989, demo)
- Rotting Christ / Monumentum (1991, split with Monumentum)
- Dawn of the Iconoclast (1991, EP)
- Ade's Winds (1992, demo)
- Apokathelosis (1993, EP)
- The Mystical Meeting (1997, single/live/cover compilation)
- Der Perfekte Traum (1999, single/live)
- In Domine Sathana (2003, live DVD)
- A Soundtrack to Mikael Häll's Doctoral Dissertation (2012, Malört förlag, split 7-inch single with Negative Plane)
- Promo 1995 (2013, EP)
- Lucifer over Athens (2015, live album)
- The Call (2017, b side the sign of evil existence live, special edition 45 rpm EP)

=== Compilations ===
- The Mystical Meeting (1995)
- Thanatiphoro Anthologio (2007, best-of compilation)
- Semigods of the Serpent Cult (2009)
- Non Serviam – A 20 Year Apocryphal Story (2009, live DVD/CD)
- 25 Years: The Path of Evil Existence (2014)
- Their Greatest Spells (2018)
- The Apocryphal Spells (2023, compilation of 21 rare songs)

=== Books ===
- Non Serviam: The Official Story Of Rotting Christ (2018)

=== Music videos ===
Year	Title	Directed	Album
1999	"After Dark I Feel"	Arnaoutoglou Vassilis	
2007	"Keravnos Kyvernitos"	Bob Katsionis	Theogonia
2007	"Enuma Elish"	Bob Katsionis	Theogonia
2013	"χξϛʹ"	Jon Simvonis, Aji Stone	Κατά τον δαίμονα εαυτού
2015	"Apage Satana"	Jon Simvonis	Rituals
2018	"Heaven and Hell and Fire"	Haris Kountouris	The Heretics
