= Sakis Tolis =

Greek heavy metal musician (born 1972)

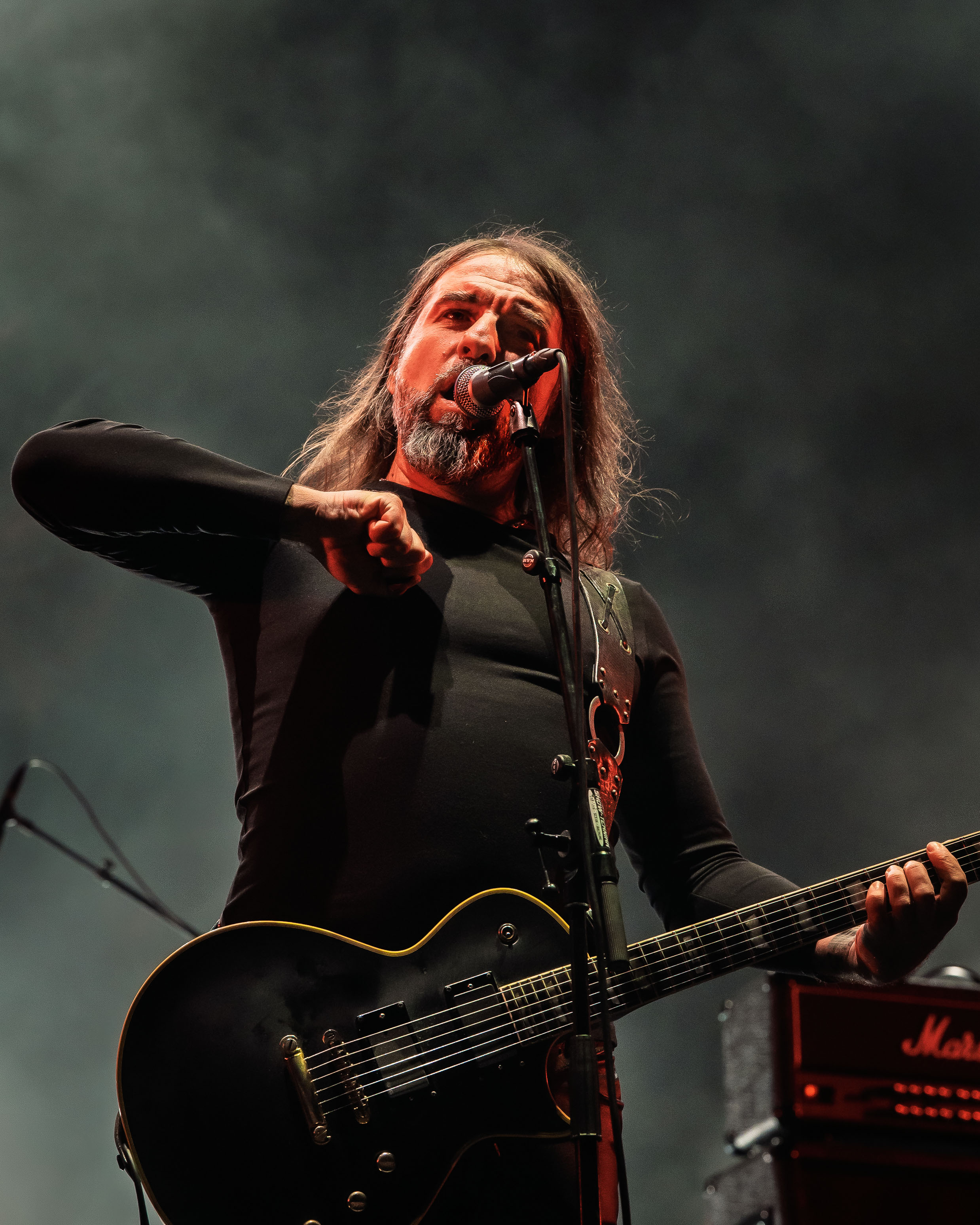
- Tolis at Midgardsblot, Norway in 2022

Background information
- Born: Athanasios Tolis; 29 June 1972 (age 54)
- Origin: Attica, Athens, Greece
- Genres: Melodic black metal, black metal, symphonic black metal, death metal, grindcore, gothic metal
- Occupations: Musician, songwriter, producer
- Instruments: Vocals, guitar
- Years active: 1987–present

Athanasios "Sakis" Tolis (Greek: Αθανάσιος "Σάκης" Τόλης; born 29 June 1972) is a Greek musician best known as the vocalist and rhythm guitarist of the black metal band Rotting Christ. He is also known as Necromayhem.

Sakis recently produced some of the band's albums and contributed as session keyboardist. He has also provided guest vocals and guitars for a number of bands, for example providing guest backing vocals on the track Mocking Modesty on the Nightrage album Wearing a Martyr's Crown and additional vocals on Spanish North of South's single "Just Fourteen Seconds", taken from their The Tides in Our Veins album.

He also played guitar in a black/death metal band Thou Art Lord, which features members from several other prominent Greek extreme metal groups, such as Necromantia and Septic Flesh.

He used to endorse Grossman custom made guitars. He currently has a signature V-Shaped guitar with the Greek letters ΧΞΣ inlaid in the fretboard. As of 2016 he is endorsed by ESP Guitars and uses an Eclipse model.

In 2018, Tolis announced he was co-authoring a book titled Non Serviam: The Official Story of Rotting Christ with Dayal Patterson. The book was published in November 2018 and details the history of the band.

On 19 March 2022, he released his first solo album, Among the Fires of Hell.

A species of prehistoric brittle star, Brezinacantha tolis, was named after him and his brother Themis Tolis.
